= List of career achievements by Andy Murray =

This is a list of career achievements by Andy Murray.

At the 2012 US Open, Murray became the first British player since 1977, and the first British man since 1936, to win a Grand Slam singles tournament, when he defeated Novak Djokovic in the final in five sets. This title made him the only British male to become a Grand Slam singles champion during the Open Era. On 7 July 2013, Murray won the 2013 Wimbledon Championships, becoming the first British player to win a Wimbledon senior singles title since Virginia Wade in 1977, and the first British man to win the Men's Singles Championship since Fred Perry, 77 years previously. Murray is the only man in history to have won Olympic Gold and the US Open in the same calendar year, as well as the third man to hold the gold medal and two majors on different surfaces (after Andre Agassi and Rafael Nadal). He is also the first tennis player and only man in history to have won two Olympic gold medals in the singles category and on two different surfaces (grass in 2012, and hard 2016). Subsequent to his success at the Olympics in 2012 and Wimbledon in 2013, Murray was voted the 2013 BBC Sports Personality of the Year.

By reaching 2016 French Open final, Murray became the 10th man since the Open Era began in 1968 to reach the final of all four Grand Slam tournaments.

In 2016, he became the only man in history to win singles titles at a Grand Slam, the Olympic Games, a Masters 1000 event, and the Year-End Championships in the same calendar year.

== Olympic Games ==
Murray is a two-time Olympic champion. In the 2012 Olympic Games, Murray defeated Roger Federer in straight sets to win the gold medal in the men's singles final, becoming the first British singles champion in over 100 years. In the 2016 Olympic Games, Murray defeated Juan Martín del Potro in 4 sets to defend his singles gold medal. He also won a silver medal in the mixed doubles, playing with Laura Robson.

== Grand Slam tournaments – Open Era records ==
- These records were attained in the Open Era.
- Records in **bold** indicate peer-less achievements.

Time Span	Records at each Grand Slam tournament	Players matched
2008 US Open — 2012 Wimbledon	First 4 finals lost	Ivan Lendl
2008 US Open — 2016 French Open	Runner-up finishes at all 4 Majors	Ivan Lendl; Roger Federer Novak Djokovic
2012 US Open — 2013 Australian Open	Reached final of next consecutive tournament after winning first title	Daniil Medvedev
2012 Olympics — 2012 US Open	Winner of Olympic singles gold medal and US Open in same calendar year	**Stands alone**
2016 Wimbledon — 2016 Olympics	Winner of Olympic singles gold medal and Wimbledon in same calendar year	Rafael Nadal
2012 Olympics — 2013 Wimbledon	Simultaneous holder of Olympic singles gold medal and Wimbledon	Rafael Nadal
2012 Olympics — 2013 Wimbledon	Simultaneous holder of Olympic singles gold medal, Wimbledon and US Open	Rafael Nadal
2012 Olympics — 2016 Olympics	Simultaneous holder of two Olympic singles gold medals and Wimbledon	**Stands alone**
2012 Olympics — 2013 Wimbledon	Simultaneous holder of two Olympic medals and two singles Majors	**Stands alone**

== Records at each Grand Slam tournament ==
- These records were attained in the Open Era.
- Records in **bold** indicate peer-less achievements.
- Records in italics are currently active streaks.

Grand Slam tournaments	Time Span	Records at each Grand Slam tournament	Players matched
Australian Open	2010–2016	5 runner-up finishes overall	**Stands alone**
Australian Open	2010–2011; 2015–2016	2 consecutive runner-up finishes	Pat Cash; Steve Denton; Stefan Edberg
Australian Open	2010–2016	First 5 finals lost	**Stands alone**
Wimbledon	2012	Latest finish for a match (11:02 pm) vs. Marcos Baghdatis	Marcos Baghdatis
US Open	2012	Longest final (by duration) vs. Novak Djokovic	Ivan Lendl; Mats Wilander; Novak Djokovic
US Open	2012	Longest tiebreak in a final (by points – 22) vs. Novak Djokovic	Novak Djokovic

== Other selected records (Olympics, ATP 500 Series, ATP Masters 1000, & Davis Cup) ==
Time span	Other selected records	Players matched
2009–2016	5 Queen's Club Championships titles	**Stands alone**
2010–2012	3 consecutive Shanghai Masters finals	**Stands alone**
2010–2016	4 Shanghai Masters finals	Novak Djokovic
2010–2015	Winner of US Open Series twice	Rafael Nadal; Andy Roddick
2006–2015	Most top-3 finishes in US Open Series (5)	John Isner
2011	Triple bagel win (6–0, 6–0, 6–0)	Nikola Špear; Karel Nováček; Stefan Edberg; Ivan Lendl; Sergi Bruguera other 11 players
2012–2016	Two consecutive Olympic singles gold medals	**Stands alone**
2012–2016	Two consecutive Olympic singles finals	**Stands alone**
2012–2016	Winner of two Olympic singles gold medals	**Stands alone**
2012–2016	Winner of two Olympic singles gold medals on two different surfaces (Grass and Hard)	**Stands alone**
2012–2016	Winner of two Olympic gold medals in Open Era	Nicolas Massu; Rafael Nadal
2012	Two medals won at the same Olympics	Mike Bryan; Stefan Edberg; Fernando González; Goran Ivanišević; Nicolás Massú; Miloslav Mečíř
2015	Eight Davis Cup singles wins in a year	John McEnroe; Mats Wilander
2012–2016	Winner of Grand Slam, World Tour Finals, Olympic Games and Masters 1000 singles titles	Andre Agassi
2012–2016	Winner of Grand Slam, World Tour Finals, Olympic Games and Masters 1000 singles titles in same year	**Stands alone**
2006–2023	11 match wins after trailing 0–2 in sets	**Stands alone**

== Personal achievements ==
Achievements below are all as a singles player

Time span	Description	Comments
2016	13 Tour finals in a single season	Tied for 27th in Open Era
2016	7 consecutive Tour finals	Tied for 14th in Open Era
2016	9 Tour titles in a single season	Tied for 29th in Open Era
2006–2017	12 consecutive seasons with 1+ title per season	Tied for 6th in Open Era
2006–2019	46 career Tour titles	Tied for 15th in Open Era
2016–2017	28 consecutive Tour-level match wins	Tied for 22nd in Open Era
2016	3 Masters 1000 titles in a single season	Tied for 14th in Open Era
2016	5 Masters 1000 finals in a single season	Tied for 7th in Open Era
2016	1 career World Tour Finals title	Tied for 11th in the Open Era
2016	3 grand slam finals in a single season	Tied for 7th in Open Era
2005–2016	11 career grand slam finals	Tied for 9th in the Open Era
2012–2016	3 career grand slam titles	Tied for 18th in Open Era
2011	Made semi-finals or better in all 4 grand slams	7th player in Open Era
2016	78 Tour-level match wins in a single season	Tied for 59th in Open Era
2016	16 match wins over top-10 opponents in a single season	Tied for 29th in Open Era
2006–2016	12 match wins over No.1 ranked opponents	5th in Open Era
2005–2024	$64,687,542 career earnings	7th highest all-time
2016	$16,349,701 single season earnings	5th highest all-time

== See also ==
- List of career achievements by Roger Federer
- List of career achievements by Rafael Nadal
- List of career achievements by Novak Djokovic

== Awards and honours ==
- BBC Young Sports Personality of the Year: 2004
- Most titles in an ATP World Tour season (6 titles): 2009
- US Open Series Champion: 2010, 2015
- Best ATP World Tour Match of the Year (3): 2010, (Note: ATP World Tour Finals semifinal lost. Rafael Nadal 6–7(5), 6–3, 6–7(6)) 2011, (Note: Rome semifinal lost. Novak Djokovic 1–6, 6–3, 6–7(2)) 2012 (Note: Shanghai final lost. Novak Djokovic 7–5, 6–7(11), 3–6)
- Officer of the Order of the British Empire: 2013
- Laureus "World Breakthrough of the Year" Award: 2013
- Glenfiddich Spirit of Scotland Award for Top Scot: 2013
- Glenfiddich Spirit of Scotland Award for Sport: 2013
- BBC Sports Personality of the Year: 2013, 2015, 2016
- Doctor of the University of Stirling: 2014
- Freeman of Stirling: 2014
- Freeman of Merton: 2014
- Arthur Ashe Humanitarian of the Year: 2014

== Notes ==
Sporting positions
Preceded by Novak Djokovic	World No. 1; 7 November 2016 – 20 August 2017	Succeeded by Rafael Nadal
Preceded by Sam Querrey; Milos Raonic	US Open Series Champion; 2010; 2015	Succeeded by Mardy Fish; Kei Nishikori
Awards
Preceded by Kate Haywood	BBC Young Sports Personality of the Year; 2004	Succeeded by Harry Aikines-Aryeetey
Preceded by Rory McIlroy	Laureus World Breakthrough of the Year; 2013	Succeeded by Marc Márquez
Preceded by Bradley Wiggins; Lewis Hamilton	BBC Sports Personality of the Year; 2013; 2015, 2016	Succeeded by Lewis Hamilton; Mo Farrah
Preceded by Roger Federer; Marcus Daniell	Arthur Ashe Humanitarian of the Year; 2014; 2022	Succeeded by Bob Bryan & Mike Bryan; Félix Auger-Aliassime
Preceded by Novak Djokovic	ATP Player of the Year; 2016	Succeeded by Rafael Nadal
Preceded by Novak Djokovic	ITF World Champion; 2016	Succeeded by Rafael Nadal
Olympic Games
Preceded by Chris Hoy	Flagbearer for Great Britain; Rio de Janeiro 2016	Succeeded by Hannah Mills & Moe Sbihi
