= List of career achievements by Roger Federer =

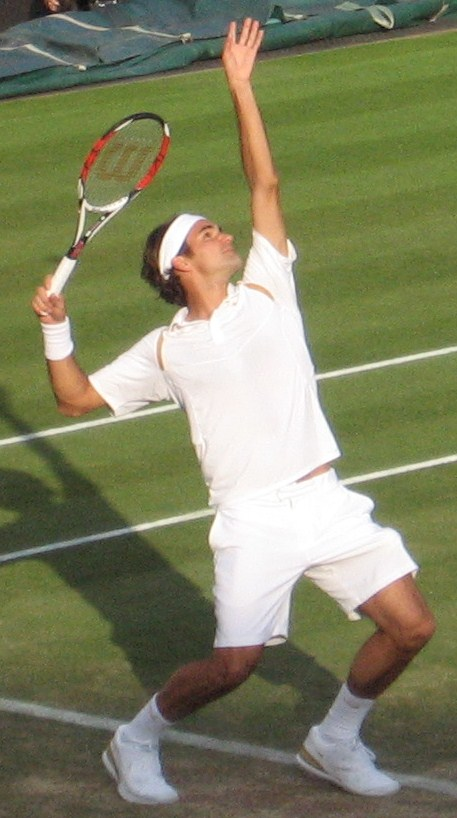
Roger Federer won 20 Grand Slam titles from 2003 to 2018 including an all-time record of eight Wimbledon titles.

Roger Federer has won 20 Grand Slam singles titles, third to Rafael Nadal (22) and Novak Djokovic (24). He has reached 31 Grand Slam finals, second behind Djokovic (38), including 10 consecutive, and another 8 consecutive (the two longest finals streaks in history), 46 semifinal appearances, second behind Djokovic, and 58 quarterfinal appearances, second behind Djokovic. He is one of eight men to have won a career Grand Slam (winning all four Grand Slams at least once) which he achieved in 2009 and is one of four players to have won a career Grand Slam on three different surfaces, hard, grass and clay courts. Federer has won 8 Wimbledon titles, an all-time record. From 2005 to 2010 Federer reached the finals in 18 out of 19 consecutive grand slams, winning 12 titles. He is the only player to win 3 different tournaments at least 5 times (Wimbledon, Australian Open, US Open). He is the only player to win two Grand Slams five consecutive times at Wimbledon from 2003 to 2007 and the US Open from 2004 to 2008. Federer has spent 310 weeks as the No. 1 ranked player in the world, second only to Djokovic, and a record of 237 consecutive weeks.

Federer has won 11 hard court Grand Slam titles (6 at the Australian Open and 5 at the US Open), which is second behind Djokovic (14). He is the only player to win 5 consecutive titles at the US Open (2004–08). Federer has won an all-time record 7 Cincinnati Masters 1000 titles. He has also won an all-time record 10 Swiss Indoors titles and has reached the final at the Swiss Indoors for a total of 15 years (2000–01, 2006–15, 2017–19) and 10 consecutive years (2006–15) and is the only player to ever achieve both feats in the Open Era in any tournament. Federer has also registered a 56-match win streak on hard courts which is the all-time record.

Federer's most successful surface is grass where he has won an Open Era record 19 grass court titles including an all-time record 10 Halle Open titles and an all-time record of 8 Wimbledon titles. He reached an all-time record 7 consecutive Wimbledon finals from 2003 to 2009. Federer has the longest grass court winning streak in the Open Era as he won 65 consecutive matches on grass from 2003 to 2008 where he was beaten by Nadal in the 2008 Wimbledon final. Due to his success on grass courts, Federer is considered by many as the greatest grass court player of all time.

Federer has also been successful on clay courts. He has reached 5 French Open finals (losing in 4 finals to Nadal, who is widely considered to be the greatest clay court player ever), and has won 6 Masters 1000 titles on clay from 16 finals. Federer won his first and only French Open title in 2009 when he also won Wimbledon, thus achieving the "Channel Slam" alongside Rod Laver, Björn Borg, Nadal and later Djokovic and Carlos Alcaraz. Federer has won 11 clay court titles from 26 finals (11 of his clay court finals losses have been to Nadal, against 2 finals wins). His consistency in his prime years on clay was surpassed only by Nadal, and Federer was widely viewed as the second-greatest clay court player from 2005 to 2011 when he achieved 1 quarterfinal, 1 semi-final, 4 runners-up, and 1 title (he succumbed only to Nadal in the semi-final and finals he lost).

Federer is the only player to register at least ten titles on clay, grass and hard courts; he has 71 hard court titles, 19 grass court titles, and 11 clay court titles. In his prime years, he won an unparalleled 11 Grand Slam tournaments (3 Australian Open titles, 4 Wimbledon titles and 4 US Open titles) of 16 events from 2004 to 2007. He reached the finals of all four Grand Slam tournaments in the same calendar year in 2006, 2007, and 2009 which is an all time record, joining Rod Laver (1969) and later joined by Djokovic (2015, 2021, 2023). In the World Tour Finals, the prestigious year-end tournament featuring the top-8 players in the year-end rankings, Federer has won 6 titles from a record 10 finals, and reached 16 semi-finals at 17 appearances. He has qualified for the tournament a record 14 consecutive years from 2002 through 2015.

Federer was selected by fellow players as winner of the Stefan Edberg Sportsmanship Award 13 times (2004–2009, 2011–2017). Fans voted for him in 2020 to receive the ATPWorldTour.com Fans' Favourite Award for an 18th straight year (since 2003). Since his Grand Slam winning debut in 2003, Federer has won a record total of 39 ATP World Tour Awards.

As of November 2020 Federer holds the world's second highest number of performance-based Guinness World Records ever achieved within a single athletic discipline (37 total / 26 performance based).

== All-time records ==
- These records were attained since the amateur era and the Open Era of tennis, beginning since 1877.

Tournament	Since	Record accomplished	Player tied	Ref(s)
Grand Slams	1877	All 4 Grand Slam finals in 1 season reached three times (2006–2007, 2009)	Novak Djokovic	
Grand Slams	1877	2 consecutive years winning 3 titles (2006–2007)	Stands alone	
Grand Slams	1877	4 consecutive years winning 2+ titles (2004–2007)	Stands alone	
Grand Slams	1877	10 consecutive men's Grand Slam finals (2005–2007)	Stands alone	
Grand Slams	1877	23 consecutive men's Grand Slam semifinals	Stands alone	
Grand Slams	1877	36 consecutive men's Grand Slam quarter-finals	Stands alone	
Grand Slams	1877	4+ consecutive finals at three tournaments	Stands alone	
Grand Slams	1877	6+ consecutive finals at two tournaments	Stands alone	
Grand Slams	1877	5 consecutive titles at two tournaments	Stands alone	
Grand Slams	1877	5+ titles at three tournaments	Stands alone	
Grand Slams	1877	40 consecutive match wins at two tournaments	Stands alone	
Grand Slams	1877	8+ titles on two different surfaces (hard & grass)	Stands alone	
Grand Slams	1877	12+ finals on two different surfaces (hard & grass)	Stands alone	
ATP Tour	1970	24 consecutive tournament finals won	Stands alone	
ATP Tour	1970	24 consecutive match wins against top 10 opponents	Stands alone	
ATP Tour	1970	56 consecutive hard court match victories	Stands alone	
ATP Tour	1970	24 ATP 500 series titles	Stands alone	
ATP Tour	1970	6+ titles at seven different tournaments (Note: Federer has won 10 titles at the Halle Open (ATP 500), 10 titles at the Swiss Indoors (ATP 500), 8 titles at Wimbledon (Grand Slam), 8 titles at the Dubai Tennis Championships (ATP 500), 7 titles at the Cincinnati Masters (Masters 1000), 6 titles at the Australian Open (Grand Slam), and 6 titles at the World Tour Finals.)	Novak Djokovic	
ATP rankings	1973	237 consecutive weeks as world No. 1	Stands alone	
ATP rankings	1973	3 consecutive calendar years as wire-to-wire No. 1 (2005–2007)	Stands alone	
ATP rankings	1973	15 years ended inside the top 3 (2003–2012, 2014–2015, 2017–2019)	Novak Djokovic	
ATP rankings	1973	18 years ended inside the top 10 (2002–2015, 2017–2020)	Rafael Nadal	
Wimbledon	1877	8 men's singles titles	Stands alone	
Cincinnati Masters	1899	7 men's singles titles	Stands alone	
Swiss Indoors	1970	10 men's singles titles	Stands alone	
Halle Open	1993	10 men's singles titles	Stands alone	
Dubai Tennis; Championships	1993	8 men's singles titles	Stands alone	
Qatar Open	1993	3 men's singles titles	Stands alone	
Thailand Open	2003–13	2 men's singles titles	Stands alone	

- Federer has won 20 Grand Slam men's singles titles, the third most in history behind Nadal and Djokovic. Federer broke the previous all-time record held by Pete Sampras (14) in 2009 before Nadal and Djokovic surpassed him in 2022.
- Federer is one of 3 players who won all 4 Grand Slams and the Year-end Championship in their career. The other 2 players are Andre Agassi and Novak Djokovic.
- Federer has been ranked world No. 1 for 310 total weeks in the Open Era. In 2012, Federer broke the previous ATP record of 286 weeks as No. 1, held by Sampras. Federer held the record of weeks as No. 1 until 8 March 2021, when Djokovic broke his record. Additionally, from 2004 through 2008, Federer held the top singles ranking for 237 consecutive weeks, breaking Jimmy Connors' 31-year-old record of 160 consecutive weeks.

== Open Era records - Grand Slams ==
- These records were attained in the Open Era of tennis.

Time Span	Grand Slam Tournament Records	Players Matched	Ref(s)
2009 French Open	Career Grand Slam	Rod Laver; Andre Agassi; Rafael Nadal; Novak Djokovic	
2003–2009	4+ consecutive finals on grass, clay, and hard courts	Stands alone	
2003 Wimbledon — 2020 Australian Open	18 consecutive years reaching 1+ semifinal	Stands alone	
2004–2011	8 consecutive years winning 20+ matches	Stands alone	
2000-2009	15 grand slam titles won in one decade (2000–2009)	Novak Djokovic	
2004 Australian Open - 2009 US Open	14 grand slam titles won in 6 years	Stands alone	
2004 Australian Open - 2007 US Open	11 grand slam titles won in 5 years	Stands alone	
2003 Wimbledon — 2017 Wimbledon	8 grass court titles	Stands alone	
2003 Wimbledon — 2017 Wimbledon	10 finals won in straight sets	Stands alone	
2003 Wimbledon — 2017 Wimbledon	Won a final in straight sets at all four tournaments	Novak Djokovic	
2004 Australian Open — 2020 Australian Open	15 semifinals at a single tournament	Rafael Nadal; Novak Djokovic	
2003 Wimbledon — 2009 French Open	5+ consecutive semifinals at all four tournaments	Stands alone	
2003 Wimbledon — 2013 French Open	9+ consecutive quarterfinals at all four tournaments	Stands alone	
2003 Wimbledon — 2006 Australian Open	First 7 finals won (7-0)	Stands alone	
2005 US Open — 2007 US Open	5 consecutive Hard Court major titles won	Stands alone	
2004 Australian Open - 2010 Australian Open	13 consecutive Hard Court Major Semi Finals	Stands alone	
2008 US Open — 2009 Wimbledon	Simultaneous holder of Grand Slams on clay, grass and hard court	Rafael Nadal; Novak Djokovic	
2009 French Open — 2009 Wimbledon	Accomplished "Channel Slam". Won both tournaments in the same year	Rod Laver; Björn Borg; Rafael Nadal; Novak Djokovic; Carlos Alcaraz	
2009 French Open — 2009 Wimbledon	Accomplished "Channel Slam" with the original two week gap between tournaments.	Rod Laver; Björn Borg; Rafael Nadal; Novak Djokovic	
2004 Wimbledon — 2018 Australian Open	10 titles defended overall	Rafael Nadal	
2007 Wimbledon — 2019 Wimbledon	9 finals played over five sets	Stands alone	
2004 Australian Open — 2018 Australian Open	6 existing Major champions defeated in finals	Björn Borg	
2006–2007, 2009	All 4 Grand Slam finals in 3 separate seasons	Novak Djokovic	
2006–2007, 2009	All 4 Grand Slam finals in 1 season	Rod Laver; Novak Djokovic	
2005–2009	5 consecutive years reaching all 4 Grand Slam semifinals	Stands alone	
2005–2012	8 consecutive years reaching all 4 Grand Slam quarterfinals	Stands alone	
2006 French Open — 2009 US Open	Runner-up finishes at all four Grand Slams	Ivan Lendl; Andy Murray	
2004, 2006–2007	Won the Hard-court treble (Australian Open, US Open, and ATP Finals on hard courts) in the same calendar season ("Hard Slam")	Novak Djokovic Jannik Sinner	
2004, 2006–2007	Won the Hard-court treble (Australian Open, US Open, and ATP Finals on hard courts) in the same calendar season ("Hard Slam") in three separate seasons	Stands alone	
2004, 2006–2007	Defended "Hard Slam" in a season	Stands alone	
2006-2007	Winner of both hard court majors for 2 consecutive seasons (Australian Open and US Open)	Stands alone	
2004–2007	Wimbledon & US Open title double won for four consecutive years	Stands alone	
2004, 2006–2007, 2017	Australian Open & Wimbledon title double in four non-consecutive years	Novak Djokovic	
2004, 2006–2007	Australian Open, Wimbledon & US Open title triple in three non-consecutive years	Stands alone	
2004, 2006–2007	Australian Open & US Open title double in three non-consecutive years	Novak Djokovic	
2006	27 match wins in 1 season	Novak Djokovic	
2003–2012, 2014–2021	18 years with match winning percentage of 80%+	Stands alone	
2004 French Open — 2008 Wimbledon	Seeded first in 18 consecutive grand slams	Stands alone	
2003 US Open — 2010 US Open	Seeded first or second in 30 consecutive grand slams	Stands alone	
2007 Australian Open — 2007 French Open	11 consecutive match victories without losing a set	John McEnroe; Rafael Nadal	
2006 US Open — 2007 French Open	36 consecutive sets won	Stands alone	
2009 Wimbledon	50 aces in a final	Stands alone	
2004 Wimbledon — 2017 US Open	6 winning streaks of 15+ matches	Stands alone	
2017 Australian Open	4 match victories vs. top 10 opponents in one tournament	Guillermo Vilas; Björn Borg; Mats Wilander; Rafael Nadal	
2003 Wimbledon — 2010 Australian Open	Highest unbeaten record against two opponents (8–0 vs. Hewitt & Roddick)	Stands alone	
2004 Wimbledon — 2009 Wimbledon	Highest unbeaten final record against one opponent (4–0 vs. Roddick)	Stands alone	
2000 Australian Open — 2021 Wimbledon	Longest time span between first grand slam match win to last win (21 years, 168 days)	Stands alone	

== Open Era records at each Grand Slam tournament ==
Grand Slam Tournaments	Time Span	Record Accomplished	Players Matched	Ref(s)
Australian Open	2004–2014, 2016–2018, 2020	15 semifinals	Stands alone	
Australian Open	2004–2014	11 consecutive semifinals	Stands alone	
Australian Open	2007	Won title without losing a set	Ken Rosewall	
Australian Open	2000–2020	117 matches played	Stands alone	
Australian Open	2000–2020	21 tournaments played	Novak Djokovic	
Australian Open	2006–2008	30 consecutive sets won	Stands alone	
Australian Open	2004, 2006–2007, 2010, 2017–2018	Title won three times on both Rebound Ace and Plexicushion Prestige	Stands alone	
Wimbledon	2003–2007, 2009, 2012, 2017	8 men's singles titles	Stands alone	
Wimbledon	2003–2007	5 consecutive titles	Björn Borg	
Wimbledon	2017	Won title without losing a set	Björn Borg	
Wimbledon	2017	Oldest champion (35 years, 11 months)	Stands alone	
Wimbledon	2003–2007, 2009, 2012, 2017	14 year gap between first and last singles title	Stands alone	
Wimbledon	2003–2009, 2012, 2014–2015, 2017, 2019	12 finals	Stands alone	
Wimbledon	2003–2009	7 consecutive finals	Stands alone	
Wimbledon	1999–2021	22 tournaments played	Stands alone	
Wimbledon	2001, 2003–2012, 2014–2019, 2021	18 quarterfinals	Stands alone	
Wimbledon	2005–2006, 2017–2018	34 consecutive sets won (twice)	Stands alone	
Wimbledon	2018	35 consecutive service points won (since 1991)	Stands alone	
Wimbledon	2019	Longest final (by duration) vs. Novak Djokovic (Note: The final took 4 hours, 57 minutes to complete.)	Novak Djokovic	
US Open	2004–2008	5 men's Singles Titles	Jimmy Connors; Pete Sampras	
US Open	2004–2008	5 consecutive titles	Stands alone	
US Open	2004–2009	40 consecutive match wins	Stands alone	
US Open	2007	35 consecutive service points won (since 1991)	Stands alone	
US Open	2007	Won as US Open Series champion	Rafael Nadal	

- Federer is the first and only player to win both Wimbledon and the US Open for four consecutive years, a feat he achieved from 2004 until 2007.

== ATP Finals and ATP Masters records ==
Tournament	Time Span	Records Accomplished	Players Matched	Ref(s)
ATP Finals	2003–2007, 2010–2012, 2014–2015	10 Finals	Stands alone	
ATP Finals	2002–2007, 2009–2015, 2017–2019	16 semifinals appearances	Stands alone	
ATP Finals	2002–2015, 2017–2019	59 match wins	Stands alone	
ATP Finals	2002–2015, 2017–2019	17 Tournament appearances	Stands alone	
ATP Finals	2002–2015	14 consecutive appearances in the ATP Finals	Stands alone	
ATP Finals	2003–2004, 2006–2007, 2010–2011	Defended tournament at three different locations	Stands alone	
ATP Finals	2003–2011	Won tournament at three different locations	Novak Djokovic	
ATP Finals	2003–2004, 2006, 2010–2011	Won tournament undefeated five times	Ivan Lendl	
ATP Masters	2002–2011	Reached finals of most (10) Masters tournaments	Rafael Nadal	
ATP Masters	2002–2011	Appearances in finals of all 9 Masters 1000 events	Novak Djokovic; Rafael Nadal; Jannik Sinner	
ATP Masters	2019	Oldest ATP Masters champion (37 years, 7 months)	Stands alone	
ATP Masters	2002–2017	Winner of nine distinct Masters titles from multiple series of ATP Masters	Stands alone	
ATP Masters	2005–2006	Winner of three North American tournaments in a single season	Novak Djokovic; Rafael Nadal	
ATP Masters	2004–2011	Winner of 7 different tournaments on hardcourt	Stands alone	
ATP Masters	2002–2017	Winner of most tournaments on different surfaces (10)	Stands alone	
ATP Masters	2012, 2015	Winner of Masters title multiple times without having serve broken or losing a set	Stands alone	
ATP Masters	2005	Winner of Indian Wells–Miami–Cincinnati Masters tournaments (US Masters hard triple)	Stands alone	
Indian Wells	2004–2006, 2012, 2017	5 men's Singles Titles	Novak Djokovic	
Indian Wells	2004–2006, 2012, 2014–2015, 2017–2019	9 Finals	Stands alone	
Indian Wells	2004–2006	3 consecutive titles	Novak Djokovic	
Indian Wells	2004–2006, 2017–2019	3 consecutive finals	Novak Djokovic	
Indian Wells	2004–2019	66 match wins	Stands alone	
Indian Wells	2017	Oldest champion (35 years, 7 months)	Stands alone	
Indian Wells	2000-2019	79 matches played	Stands alone	
Indian Wells	2000-2019	Most editions played - 18	Stands alone	
Indian Wells	2000-2019	12 Semi Finals	Stands alone	
Miami Open	2019	Oldest champion (37 years, 7 months)	Stands alone	
Madrid Masters	2006, 2009, 2012	Surface sweep of single Masters tournament (Indoor hardcourt, Red clay, Blue clay)	Stands alone	
Shanghai Masters	2017	Oldest champion (36 years, 2 months)	Stands alone	
Hamburg Masters	2002, 2004–2005, 2007	4 men's Singles Titles	Stands alone	
Hamburg Masters	2004–2005	2 consecutive titles	Eddie Dibbs; Andrei Medvedev	
Hamburg Masters	2002, 2004–2005, 2007–2008	5 Finals	Stands alone	
Hamburg Masters	2004–2008	21 consecutive match wins	Stands alone	
Cincinnati Masters	2005, 2007, 2009–2010, 2012, 2014–2015	7 men's Singles Titles	Stands alone	
Cincinnati Masters	2005, 2007, 2009–2010, 2012, 2014–2015, 2018	8 Finals	Novak Djokovic	
Cincinnati Masters	2009–2010, 2014–2015	2 consecutive titles	Andre Agassi; Michael Chang; Mats Wilander	
Cincinnati Masters	2003–2019	47 match wins	Stands alone	
Cincinnati Masters	2012, 2015	Won title twice without having serve broken or losing a set	Stands alone	
Cincinnati Masters	2003–2019	Most times seeded No. 1 - 7	Stands alone	
Cincinnati Masters	2003–2019	Most matches played - 57	Novak Djokovic	
Cincinnati Masters	2003–2019	Most editions played - 17	Stands alone	

- Roger Federer is the first player to win more than 5 titles at the World Tour Finals. Federer is the first and only player to reach 10 finals overall and 16 semi-finals. He has appeared in the 8-man year-end tournament 14 consecutive times and total 17 times, and is the only player to achieve both these feats in the open era.
- Roger Federer is the first player to win nine different Masters events of the ATP Masters.
- Roger Federer is the first player to win five different Masters tournaments with no sets dropped.
- Roger Federer is the first player to win Masters tournaments with no sets dropped on three surfaces (Hard/Clay/Indoors).

== Records at each ATP 500 Series tournament ==
Tournaments	Years	Record Accomplished	Players Matched	Ref(s)
Dubai Tennis Championships	2003–05, 2007, 2012, 2014–15, 2019	8 men's Singles Titles	Stands alone	
Dubai Tennis Championships	2003–07, 2011–12, 2014–15, 2019	10 Finals	Stands alone	
Dubai Tennis Championships	2003-2019	11 Semi Finals	Stands alone	
Dubai Tennis Championships	2003–2005	3 consecutive titles	Novak Djokovic	
Dubai Tennis Championships	2003–2007	5 consecutive finals	Stands alone	
Dubai Tennis Championships	2003–2006	19 consecutive match wins	Stands alone	
Swiss Indoors	2006–08, 2010–11, 2014–15, 2017–19	10 men's Singles Titles^{[*]}	Stands alone	
Swiss Indoors	2006–2008, 2017–2019	3 consecutive titles	Stands alone	
Swiss Indoors	2000–01, 2006–15, 2017–19	15 Finals	Stands alone	
Swiss Indoors	2000-2019	16 Semi Finals	Stands alone	
Swiss Indoors	2006–2015	10 consecutive finals	Stands alone	
Swiss Indoors	2014–2019	24 consecutive match wins	Stands alone	
Swiss Indoors	1998-2019	Most tournament appearances - 19	Stands alone	
Swiss Indoors	1998-2019	Most matches won - 75	Stands alone	
Swiss Indoors	1998-2019	Most matches played - 84	Stands alone	
Rotterdam Open	2005, 2012, 2018	3 men's Singles Titles	Arthur Ashe	
Rotterdam Open	2001, 2005, 2012, 2018	4 finals	Jimmy Connors	

^{*} 3 out of the 10 Swiss Indoors titles were won when the tournament was an ATP 250 series event before 2009.

- Halle Open used to be an ATP 250 series tournament before 2015 when Federer won the majority (7) of his titles there.

== Other significant records (ATP Tour) ==
- * The ATP ranking was frozen from 23 March to 23 August 2020

Time span	Record accomplished	Players matched	Ref(s)
2 February 2004 – 17 August 2008	237 consecutive weeks at No. 1	Stands alone	
2005–2007	3 calendar years as wire-to-wire No. 1	Jimmy Connors	
2005–2007	3 consecutive calendar years as wire-to-wire No. 1	Stands alone	
2 February 2004 – 18 June 2018	14 years, 136 days between first and last stints at No. 1	Stands alone	
4 November 2012 – 19 February 2018	5 years, 106 days between stints at No. 1	Stands alone	
17 November 2003 – 4 July 2010	346 consecutive weeks in Top 2	Stands alone	
2003–2010	8 consecutive years ranked inside Top 2	Stands alone	
2003–2012, 2014–2015, 2017–2019	15 times ranked year-end Top 3	Novak Djokovic	
20 May 2002 – 11 October 2021	968 weeks ranked in Top 10	Stands alone	
2002–2015, 2017–2020	18 times ranked year-end Top 10	Rafael Nadal; Novak Djokovic	
26 February 2001 – 24 January 2022	1064 weeks ranked in Top 20	Stands alone	
23 April 2001 – 24 January 2022	1062 consecutive weeks in Top 20	Stands alone	
2001–2021	21 times ranked year-end Top 20	Stands alone	
6 March 2000 – 6 June 2022	1133 weeks ranked in Top 50	Stands alone	
12 June 2000 – 6 June 2022	1126 consecutive weeks in Top 50	Stands alone	
2000–2021	22 times ranked year-end Top 50	Stands alone	
20 September 1999 – 4 July 2022	1166 weeks ranked in Top 100	Stands alone	
11 October 1999 – 4 July 2022	1165 consecutive weeks in Top 100	Stands alone	
2000–2019	Longest time span between first final to last final (19 years, 256 days)	Stands alone	
1999–2021	23 times ranked year-end Top 100	Stands alone	
2003–2005	24 consecutive match victories vs. top 10 opponents	Stands alone	
2003–2006	Won Halle Open and Wimbledon for four consecutive years	Stands alone	
2003–2008	Reached Halle Open and Wimbledon final for six consecutive years	Stands alone	
1999–2021	783 hard court match victories	Stands alone	
2000–2021	192 grass court match victories	Stands alone	
2005–2006	9 consecutive hard court titles	Stands alone	
2005–2006	56 consecutive hard court match victories	Stands alone	
2006	59 hard court match wins in a season	Novak Djokovic	
2000–2021	86.88% (192–29) grass court match winning percentage	Stands alone	
2003–2008	10 consecutive grass court titles	Stands alone	
2003–2008	65 consecutive grass court match victories	Stands alone	
2003–2010	13 consecutive grass court finals reached	Stands alone	
2003–2004	36 consecutive sets on grass court won	Stands alone	
2005	Winner of US Masters treble + US Open	Stands alone	
2005	98% Win Rate (Highest) on Hardcourts in a single season	Stands alone	
2003–2005	24 consecutive tournament finals won	Stands alone	
2002–2012	1+ Big Title for 11 consecutive years (Grand Slams, ATP Finals or ATP Masters 1000)	Pete Sampras	
2001–2019	10+ titles on grass, clay and hard courts	Stands alone	
2003–2019	19 grass court titles	Stands alone	
2003–2019	27 grass court finals	Stands alone	
2000–2019	98 hard court finals	Stands alone	
2002–2019	24 ATP 500 Series titles	Stands alone	
2014–2015	5 consecutive ATP 500 series titles	Rafael Nadal	
2001–2019	31 ATP 500 Series finals	Stands alone	
2014–2016	28 consecutive ATP 500 Series match wins	Stands alone	
2004–2008	13 consecutive ATP 250 Series titles	Stands alone	
2000–2018	34 ATP 250 Series finals	Stands alone	
2004–2009	68 consecutive ATP 250 Series match wins	Stands alone	
2000, 2001, 2006–2015, 2017–2019	15 finals at a single tournament (Swiss Indoors)	Stands alone	
2006–2015	10 consecutive finals at a single tournament (Swiss Indoors)	Stands alone	
2003–06, 2008, 2013–15, 2017, 2019	10 Halle Open titles	Stands alone	
2003–2006	4 consecutive Halle Open titles	Stands alone	
2003–2006	4 consecutive Halle Open finals	Stands alone	
2003–2019	13 Halle Open finals	Stands alone	
2004, 2008, 2017	3 Halle Open titles without losing a set	Stands alone	
2003–2019	15 Halle Open Semi Finals	Stands alone	
2003–2019	18 Halle Open Tournament appearances	Stands alone	
2005, 2006, 2011	3 Qatar Open titles	Stands alone	
2004–2005	2 Thailand Open titles	Stands alone	
2006	9 hard court titles in 1 season	Jimmy Connors	
2005	7 titles defended in a season	Novak Djokovic	
2004–2006	3 consecutive years winning 10+ titles	Rod Laver	
2003–2012, 2014–2015, 2017–2020	16 years with a match winning percentage of 80%+	Stands alone	
2003–2019	7+ titles at five different tournaments	Stands alone	
2003–2019	6+ titles at seven different tournaments	Novak Djokovic	
2000–2019	10+ finals at six different tournaments	Stands alone	
2006	94.1% of tournament finals reached in 1 season	Stands alone	
2005–2007	2 winning streaks of 35+ matches	Björn Borg; Jimmy Connors	
2004–2007	4 winning streaks of 25+ matches	Stands alone	
2005	Winner of Doha–Dubai Double in a single season	Daniil Medvedev	
2001–2019	3 Hopman Cup titles overall	Stands alone	
2018–2019	2 consecutive Hopman Cup titles	James Blake	
2017	Best performance in a Laver Cup tournament (win–loss: matches 3–0, points 7–0)	Stands alone	
2017–2019	Best performance in Laver Cup singles overall (win–loss: matches 6–0, points 15–0)	Stands alone	
2005	Full season without losing a match in straight sets	Jannik Sinner	
2004	Calendar ATP-Tour sweep (Won ATP 250, ATP 500, Masters 1000, ATP Finals, Grand Slam events once in a single season)	Novak Djokovic	
2004	Calendar ATP-Tour Surface sweep (Won titles of different ATP-tour events on different (Hard, Hard(i), Clay, Grass) surfaces)	Stands alone	
2006–2007	Winner of ATP Hard Treble titles consecutively (US Open–ATP Finals–Australian Open)	Jannik Sinner	

== Guinness World Records ==
As of November 2025 Roger Federer holds - 18 performance based records. Higher number (33) is held by Fiann Paul.

performance based records:

1. Most consecutive Men's Grand Slam semi-finals (21)
2. First male player to win 100 singles matches at a Grand Slam tennis tournament (Wimbledon 2019 QFs)
3. Most Wimbledon Men's singles tennis titles (8)
4. Most French Open Tennis Men's Singles Final defeats (4; tied Djokovic)
5. Most tennis singles matches on grass won consecutively, male (65)
6. Most aces served in a Grand Slam singles final (Wimbledon 2009)
7. First tennis player to reach 10 consecutive finals at a single tournament (Basel 2006-15)
8. Most grass-court singles titles won consecutively (10; 5 Halle, 5 Wimbledon)
9. First tennis player to win 10 finals on two different surfaces (10 Halle [grass], 10 Basel [hard])
10. Most consecutive tennis final victories (24)
11. Most consecutive tennis Grand Slam quarter-finals (36)
12. Most consecutive Grand Slam singles finals, male (10)
13. First tennis player to defend 10 Grand Slam singles titles, male
14. Most consecutive seasons at the ATP World Tour Finals (14)
15. Most finals played at a single tennis tournament (15 Basel)
16. Most singles appearances at the ATP Finals (17)
17. Most matches played on the ATP Tour without retiring (1,526 matches played; 0 retired)
18. Most games in a tennis Wimbledon singles final, male (77 vs. Andy Roddick; Andy 39, Roger 38)

other records:

1. Most powerful sports star
2. Most Laureus World Sports Awards won
3. Most Laureus World Sportsman of the Year awards won
4. Longest Wimbledon singles final
5. Most playable real-life characters in a tennis video game
6. Most tennis Grand Slam meetings (singles)
7. Longest Olympic tennis match (duration)

== Awards ==
This is a list of awards Swiss tennis player Roger Federer has won in his career.

=== 1998 ===
- ITF World Junior Champion

=== 2003 ===
- ATP European Player of the Year
- Swiss Sportsman of the Year
- Swiss of the Year
- Michael-Westphal Award

=== 2004 ===
1. ATP European Player of the Year
2. ATPTennis.com Fans' Favourite award (For the year 2003)
3. ITF World Champion
4. Sports Illustrated Tennis Player of the Year
5. Swiss Sportsman of the Year
6. Reuters International Sportsman of the Year
7. BBC Overseas Sports Personality of the Year
8. International Tennis Writers Association (ITWA) Player of the Year
9. International Tennis Writers Ambassador (ITWA) for Tennis
10. European Sportsman of the Year (aka UEPS [Federation of European sports journalists] Sportsman of the Year)

=== 2005 ===
1. Ambassador of United Nations' Year of Sport and Physical Education
2. Goldene Kamera Award
3. ATP Player of the Year (for the year 2004)
4. Stefan Edberg Sportsmanship Award (for the year 2004)
5. ATPTennis.com Fans' Favourite (for the year 2004)
6. Laureus World Sportsman of the Year (for the year 2004)
7. Michael-Westphal Award
8. International Tennis Writers Association (ITWA) Player of the Year
9. International Tennis Writers Ambassador for Tennis
10. Most Outstanding Athlete by the United States Sports Academy
11. Freedom Air People's Choice Sports Awards International Sportsperson of the Year
12. ITF World Champion
13. ESPY Best Male Tennis Player
14. La Gazzetta dello Sport named him World Sportsman of the Year
15. European Sportsman of the Year (aka UEPS [Federation of European sports journalists] Sportsman of the Year)
16. The 'Prix Orange' Award

=== 2006 ===
1. L'Equipe Magazine's Champion of Champions (for the year 2005)
2. ATP Player of the Year (for the year 2005)
3. Stefan Edberg Sportsmanship Award (for the year 2005)
4. ATPTennis.com Fans' Favourite (for the year 2005)
5. Laureus World Sportsman of the Year (for the year 2005)
6. ESPY Best Male Tennis Player
7. International Tennis Writers Association (ITWA) Player of the Year
8. International Tennis Writers Ambassador for Tennis
9. ITF World Champion
10. BBC Overseas Sports Personality of the Year
11. Swiss Sportsman of the Year
12. EFE's Sportsman of the Year
13. Most Outstanding Athlete of the Year by The United States Sports Academy
14. European Sportsman of the Year (aka UEPS [Federation of European sports journalists] Sportsman of the Year)
15. La Gazzetta dello Sport named him World Sportsman of the Year
16. The 'Prix Orange' Award
17. Baccarat Athlete of the Year 2006

=== 2007 ===
1. Time magazine named him as one of the 100 most important people in the world.
2. L'Equipe Magazine's Champion of Champions (for the year 2006)
3. ATP Player of the Year (for the year 2006)
4. Stefan Edberg Sportsmanship Award (for the year 2006)
5. ATPTennis.com Fans' Favourite (for the year 2006)
6. Arthur Ashe Humanitarian of the Year (for the year 2006)
7. Laureus World Sportsman of the Year (for the year 2006)
8. ESPY Best Male Tennis Player
9. ESPY Best Male International Athlete
10. ITF World Champion
11. BBC Overseas Sports Personality of the Year
12. Tennis magazine's 2007 player of the year
13. La Gazzetta dello Sport named him World Sportsman of the Year
14. Swiss Sportsman of the Year
15. The 'Prix Orange' Award
16. Marca Leyenda
17. US Open Series Champion

=== 2008 ===
1. L'Equipe Magazine's Champion of Champions (for the year 2007)
2. European Sportsman of the Year (for the year 2007) (aka UEPS [Federation of European sports journalists] Sportsman of the Year)
3. Laureus World Sportsman of the Year (for the year 2007) – First ever winner of four Laureus World Sports Awards
4. Men's Doubles gold medalist partnering Stanislas Wawrinka at the 2008 Olympic Games held in Beijing, China
5. ATP Player of the Year (for the year 2007)
6. Stefan Edberg Sportsmanship Award (for the year 2007)
7. ATPTennis.com Fans' Favourite (for the year 2007)
8. ESPY Best Male Tennis Player
9. Swiss Team of the Year (with Stanislas Wawrinka)
10. The 'Prix Orange' Award

=== 2009 ===
1. Stefan Edberg Sportsmanship Award (for the year 2008)
2. ATPWorldtour.com (formerly ATPTennis.com) Fans' Favourite (for the year 2008)
3. Talksport Hall of Fame
4. ESPY Best Male Tennis Player
5. Ehrespalebaerglemer award. An award given to outstanding citizens of the city of Basel.
6. ATPWorldtour.com Player of the Decade
7. ITF World Champion
8. European Sportsman of the Year (aka UEPS [Federation of European sports journalists] Sportsman of the Year)
9. One of Sports Illustrated's Athletes of the Decade
10. Listed at #27 on the Forbes Celebrity 100
11. European Sportsman of the Year
12. The 'Prix Orange' Award
13. Best Match of the Year (Note: Wimbledon final def. Andy Roddick 5–7, 7–6(8–6), 7–6(7–5), 3–6, 16–14)

=== 2010 ===
1. International Tennis Writers' Association's Ambassador of the Year
2. ESPY Best Male Tennis Player
3. ATP Player of the Year (for the year 2009)
4. ATPWorldTour.com Fans' Favourite (for the year 2009)
5. Stefan Edberg Sportsmanship Award (for the year 2009)
6. ATPWorldTour.com Fans' Favourite (for the year 2010)
7. MARCA magazine's Sportsman of the Decade
8. Listed at #29 on the Forbes Celebrity 100
9. Compeed Elegance Award

=== 2011 ===
1. Stefan Edberg Sportsmanship Award
2. ATPWorldtour.com Fans' Favourite
3. Listed at #25 on the Forbes Celebrity 100
4. Best Grand Slam/Davis Cup Match of the Year (Note: US Open semifinal lost to Novak Djokovic 7–6(9–7), 6–4, 3–6, 2–6, 5–7)
5. Only player to "bagel" (6-0 set) Nadal on three different surfaces. (2006 Wimbledon (Grass), 2007 Hamburg (Clay) 2011 World Tour Finals (indoor hard)

=== 2012 ===
1. Listed at #1 in 100 Greatest of All Time by Tennis Channel
2. Listed at #5 in Forbes list of 100 richest athletes of the world
3. Singles silver medalist at 2012 Olympic Games held in London, England
4. Stefan Edberg Sportsmanship Award
5. ATPWorldtour.com Fans' Favourite
6. Swiss Sportsman of the Year
7. Hello Magazine's Most Attractive Man of 2012
8. Davis Cup Commitment Award

=== 2013 ===
1. Stefan Edberg Sportsmanship Award
2. ATPWorldtour.com Fans' Favourite
3. Arthur Ashe Humanitarian of the Year
4. Jean Borotra Sportsmanship Award.

=== 2014 ===
1. US Open Sportsmanship Award
2. Stefan Edberg Sportsmanship Award
3. ATPWorldtour.com Fans' Favourite
4. Swiss Sportsman of the Year
5. Swiss Team of the Year (with Stanislas Wawrinka, Marco Chiudinelli, Michael Lammer, Severin Lüthi )
6. Best Grand Slam Match of the Year (Note: Wimbledon final lost to Novak Djokovic 6–7(7–9), 6–4, 7–6(7–4), 5–7, 6–4)
7. Davis Cup Most Valuable Player (shared with Stan Wawrinka)

=== 2015 ===
1. International Tennis Writers' Association's Ambassador of the Year (for the year 2014)
2. Stefan Edberg Sportsmanship Award
3. ATPWorldtour.com Fans' Favourite
4. International Tennis Writers' Association's Ambassador of the Year

=== 2016 ===
1. Stefan Edberg Sportsmanship Award
2. ATPWorldtour.com Fans' Favourite
3. Most Stylish Man of the Year by GQ
4. Most Marketable Sports Person
5. Top global athlete brand in Forbes Fab 40

=== 2017 ===
1. Stefan Edberg Sportsmanship Award
2. ATPWorldtour.com Fans' Favourite
3. Comeback Player of the year
4. Best ATP World Tour match of the year
5. Best Grand Slam match of the year
6. Swiss Sportsman of the Year
7. BBC Overseas Sports Personality of the Year
8. ESPY Best Male Tennis Player
9. AIPS Athletes of the Year
10. L'Equipe Magazine's Champion of Champions
11. La Gazzetta dello Sport named him World Sportsman of the Year
12. Eurosport International Athlete of the Year
13. ESPN's MVP
14. Sports Illustrated's Tennis MVP

=== 2018 ===
1. International Tennis Writers' Association's Ambassador of the Year (for the year 2017)
2. European Sportsman of the Year (for the year 2017) (aka UEPS [Federation of European sports journalists] Sportsman of the Year)
3. Laureus World Sportsman of the Year (for the year 2017)
4. Laureus World Comeback of the Year (for the year 2017)
5. ESPY Best Male Tennis Player
6. ATPWorldtour.com Fans' Favourite
7. Best Record-Breaking Performance ESPY Award
8. Best ATP World Tour match of the year

=== 2019 ===
1. ESPY Best Male Tennis Player
2. Best Grand slam match of the year
3. ATPTour.com Fans' Favourite
4. Most Stylish Man of the Decade by GQ

=== 2020 ===
1. Swiss Sportsman of the last 70 years
2. ITF Champion of Champions
3. ATPTour.com Fans' Favourite Award

=== 2021 ===
1. ATPTour.com Fans' Favourite Award

=== 2022 ===
1. Honorary Swiss Sports award

=== 2023 ===
1. First international Icon Athlete award

=== 2024 ===
1. Honorary Doctor of Humane Letters award by Dartmouth College (June 2024)
2. The prize for a Better Tomorrow award to The Roger Federer Foundation (July 2024)

=== 2025 ===
1. Global Fan Vote Winner (October 2025)
2. Elected to the International Tennis Hall of Fame (November 2025)

=== 2026 ===
1. Forbes World's Billionaire Status (March 2026)

== See also ==
- List of celebrities by net worth
- List of career achievements by Rafael Nadal
- List of career achievements by Novak Djokovic
- List of career achievements by Andy Murray

== Footnotes ==
Sporting positions
Preceded by Andy Roddick; Rafael Nadal; Novak Djokovic; Rafael Nadal; Rafael Nadal; Rafael Nadal	World No. 1 February 2, 2004 – August 17, 2008; July 6, 2009 – June 7, 2010; July 9, 2012 – November 4, 2012; February 19, 2018 – April 1, 2018; May 14, 2018 – May 20, 2018; June 18, 2018 – June 24, 2018	Succeeded by Rafael Nadal; Rafael Nadal; Novak Djokovic; Rafael Nadal; Rafael Nadal; Rafael Nadal
Preceded by Andy Roddick	US Open Series Champion; 2007	Succeeded by Rafael Nadal
Awards and achievements
Preceded by Andy Roddick; Rafael Nadal	ITF World Champion – Men's singles 2004–2007; 2009	Succeeded by Rafael Nadal; Rafael Nadal
Preceded by Andy Roddick; Rafael Nadal	ATP Player of the Year; 2004–2007; 2009	Succeeded by Rafael Nadal; Rafael Nadal
Preceded by Marat Safin	ATP Fans' Favorite Player; 2003–2018	Incumbent
Preceded by Paradorn Srichaphan; Rafael Nadal	ATP Stefan Edberg Sportsmanship Award; 2004–2009; 2011–2017	Succeeded by Rafael Nadal; Rafael Nadal
Preceded by Simon Ammann; Thomas Lüthi; Didier Cuche; Dario Cologna; Fabian Cancellara	Swiss Sportsman of the Year; 2003–2004; 2006–2007; 2012; 2014; 2017	Succeeded by Thomas Lüthi; Fabian Cancellara; Dario Cologna; Stan Wawrinka; Nino Schurter
Preceded by ~~Lance Armstrong~~; Shane Warne; Simone Biles	BBC Overseas Sports Personality of the Year; 2004; 2006–2007; 2017	Succeeded by Shane Warne; Usain Bolt; Francesco Molinari
Preceded by Andy Roddick; Novak Djokovic	Best Male Tennis Player ESPY Award; 2005–2010; 2017, 2018	Succeeded by Rafael Nadal; Incumbent
Preceded by Michael Schumacher; Usain Bolt	Laureus World Sportsman of the Year; 2005–2008; 2018	Succeeded by Usain Bolt; Novak Djokovic
Preceded by Hicham El Guerrouj; Usain Bolt	L'Équipe Champion of Champions; 2005–2007; 2017 (with Rafael Nadal)	Succeeded by Usain Bolt; Marcel Hirscher
Preceded by Michael Phelps	Gazzetta dello Sport; Sportsman of the Year; 2005–2007	Succeeded by Usain Bolt
Preceded by Carlos Moyá; Novak Djokovic	Arthur Ashe Humanitarian of the Year; 2006; 2013	Succeeded by Ivan Ljubičić; Andy Murray
Preceded by Juan Martín del Potro	ATP Comeback Player of the Year; 2017	Succeeded by Novak Djokovic
Records
Preceded by Pete Sampras; Novak Djokovic	ATP Prize money leader 2007–2016; 2017–2018	Succeeded by Novak Djokovic; Novak Djokovic
Preceded by Pete Sampras	Most career Grand Slam singles titles July 5, 2009 –	Incumbent
Preceded by Pete Sampras	Most weeks at World No. 1 July 16, 2012 – March 8, 2021	Succeeded by Novak Djokovic
Incumbent
Olympic Games
Preceded by Thomas Frischknecht	Flagbearer for Switzerland; Athens 2004; Beijing 2008	Succeeded by Stanislas Wawrinka
