= List of career achievements by Rafael Nadal =

This article lists various career, tournament, and seasonal achievements by the Spanish tennis player Rafael Nadal.

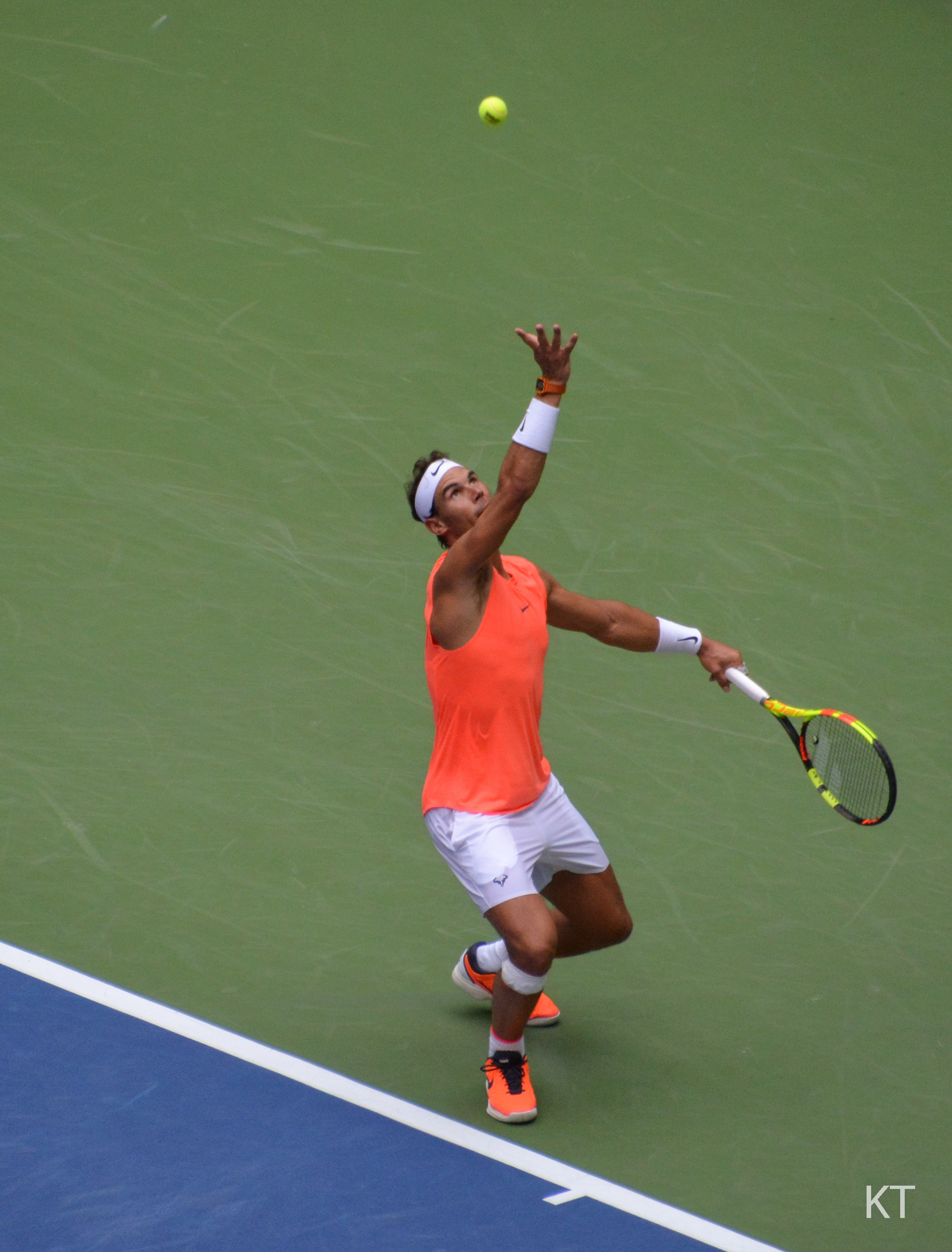
Rafael Nadal at the 2018 US Open.

== Historic Achievements ==
Rafael Nadal has won 22 Grand Slam men’s singles titles, second-most of all time.

Nadal has contested 30 Grand Slam finals in his career, which is third to Novak Djokovic's 37 and Roger Federer's 31 finals appearances, respectively. He has appeared in at least five finals at each major (second to Djokovic's seven) and is the only man to win multiple majors in three separate decades. Nadal won at least one major for 10 consecutive years (2005–2014) and 15 years overall, which are both all-time records in men's tennis. He holds the record for most titles at three ATP Tour levels: Grand Slam Tournaments (French Open - 14), Masters 1000 (Monte Carlo - 11), and ATP 500 (Barcelona - 12). Nadal has won 92 ATP titles in his career, including 36 Masters titles. By the age of 24 years, 3 months and 10 days, Nadal had won all four majors in singles (Career Grand Slam) and the Olympic singles gold medal (Career Golden Slam) in his career, and is the second youngest player to achieve this. After winning the 2022 Australian Open, he became the fourth man in history (joining Roy Emerson, Rod Laver, and Djokovic) to win all four majors at least two times in his career (Double Career Grand Slam). Nadal is the only man in history to complete the Career Grand Slam and win an Olympic gold medal in both singles and doubles.

Known as the "King of Clay," Nadal won the French Open nine times in his first 10 attempts. He has won the event 14 times overall, with a match record of 112–4 (96.6% win rate), which is viewed by many analysts as one of the greatest feats in tennis and world sport. Nadal's dominance on the surface is further accentuated by his unique feat of winning the three clay-court Masters 1000 tournaments (Monte Carlo, Madrid, Rome) and the French Open in the same season (2010), thus becoming the only player to complete the Clay Slam. Nadal won the French Open on his first attempt as a 19-year-old in 2005 and went on to win four consecutive crowns from 2005 to 2008, defeating then-world-No. 1 Roger Federer in three consecutive finals from 2006 to 2008 and again in the 2011 final. To date, Nadal is the only player to defeat Federer in four finals at the same major. Nadal is also the only player to beat Federer in the finals of three different Grand Slam tournaments — the French Open, the Australian Open, and Wimbledon). Having faced his first of four career-losses at the French Open against Robin Söderling in 2009, he would go on to win five consecutive titles from 2010 to 2014. Nadal further cemented his place in history by achieving "La Decima" — a 10th title at the 2017 French Open, where he did not drop a set and lost only 35 games (only three shy of Björn Borg's record of 32 games lost). He would then go on to win four consecutive crowns from 2017 to 2020 and another in 2022, making Nadal the only player, male or female, to win 14 titles at a single Grand Slam tournament in tennis history. Additionally, his 2020 French Open victory also made Nadal the only player in history to have three streaks of four consecutive titles at a major, as well as three streaks of 30+ consecutive match wins at the same major. He has never been taken to five sets in the final of the French Open, and is the only player to achieve this level of dominance at a single major. Additionally, Nadal is 137–4 in best of five matches on clay (a win percentage of 97.2%). Nadal did not lose a single semifinal on clay courts for 12 years (52–0) from the 2003 Croatia Open to the 2015 Rio Open — an all-time record on a single surface. He holds the record for the longest single surface win streak in the Open Era, having won 81 consecutive matches on clay courts from 2005 to 2007. Nadal also holds the Open Era record for the most consecutive sets won on a single surface (50 on clay). On clay, he has won an all-time record 14 majors, a record 26 Masters 1000 titles, and an Open Era record 63 titles overall. Nadal has won an all-time record 11 titles at the Monte Carlo Masters, including an Open Era record streak of eight consecutive titles from 2005 to 2012 and three consecutive titles from 2016 to 2018. He has also won an all-time record 10 titles at the Rome Masters.

Nadal's profound success in the sport is not limited to clay courts. Over the course of his career, he has won 514 matches on hard courts (4th in the Open Era behind Federer, Djokovic, and Andre Agassi). He is the only player, male or female, to have recorded 470+ match wins on both hard and clay courts. He has won six hard-court Grand Slam titles (4th all-time behind Djokovic, Federer, and Pete Sampras). He has won each major multiple times on clay, hard, and grass courts. He has won two Australian Open (hard), two Wimbledon (grass), and four US Open (hard) titles. Nadal is the first Spaniard to win the Australian Open and the second to win Wimbledon. In 2008, he became only the third player in the Open Era, after Rod Laver (1969) and Björn Borg (1980), to win the French Open and Wimbledon crowns in a calendar year (Channel Slam), a feat he repeated in 2010. He is the only male player in tennis history to win the French Open and the US Open in a calendar year on four occasions (2010, 2013, 2017, 2019). Nadal won the Olympic singles gold medal in Beijing (2008) and the Olympic doubles gold medal in Rio de Janeiro (2016) on hard courts. He has won 10 Masters 1000 titles at hard court events — five in Canada, three in Indian Wells, one in Cincinnati, and one in Madrid indoors). Nadal dominated the North American hard court season in 2013, having already won the Indian Wells title earlier in the year, he would go on to win 26 consecutive matches on hard courts by winning the Canadian Masters, Cincinnati Masters as well as the US Open, thus joining Patrick Rafter (1998) and Andy Roddick (2003) in completing the Summer Slam.

Nadal has been ranked world No.1 for 209 weeks by the ATP, and has finished as the year-end No. 1 five times (2008, 2010, 2013, 2017, and 2019). He is the only man to have been ranked world No. 1 in three decades (2000s, 2010s, and 2020s). He is the first man to finish as the year-end No. 1 twice after turning 30 years old (2017 and 2019). He was the first male player, and one of only two players (also Djokovic), to regain the year-end No. 1 crown four times and finish as the year-end No. 1 in five non-consecutive years. He also has the most wins against world No. 1 ranked players, with 23 in total. He appeared in the Top 10 of the ATP rankings consecutively from April 25, 2005 to March 19, 2023 – the longest rankings streak in the history of men's tennis (912 weeks), breaking Jimmy Connors record of 788 consecutive weeks. Nadal qualified for the Year-End Championships for a record 16 consecutive years from 2005 to 2020.

Nadal also holds the Open Era record for the most consecutive years winning at least two ATP singles titles (18 years from 2005–2022, shared with Djokovic 2006–2023). Nadal ranks second in the Open Era for the highest clay court match-winning percentage (minimum 100 wins) at 90.5% (484–51 record).

== All time tournament records ==
- These records, all in singles, were attained since the amateur era (1877) and the Open Era of tennis (1968).
- Records in italics are currently active streaks.

Tournament	Since	Record accomplished	Player(s) tied
Grand Slams	1908 (Note: Between 1928 and 1984, tennis was not included in the official Olympic program.)	Career Golden Slam: Won all four majors and the Olympic gold medal in singles	Andre Agassi; Novak Djokovic
Grand Slams	1908	Career Golden Slam + Olympic gold medal in doubles	Stands alone
Grand Slams	1978	Surface Slam: Won majors on three different surfaces in a calendar year (2010)	Novak Djokovic (2021)
Grand Slams	1978	Simultaneous holder of majors on clay, grass, and hard courts (2008–09)	Roger Federer (2009–10); Novak Djokovic (2015–16)
Grand Slams	1896	Simultaneous holder of Olympic gold medal, majors on clay, grass, and hard courts (2008)	Stands alone
Grand Slams	1896	Won Olympic gold medal and majors on clay, grass, and hard courts in a calendar year (2008)	Stands alone
Grand Slams	1925	Double Channel Slam: Won the French–Wimbledon title double in a calendar year twice (2008, 2010)	Rod Laver; Björn Borg
Grand Slams	1908	Youngest male player to achieve the Career Golden Slam (24)	Stands alone
Grand Slams	1877	14 titles won at a single major (French Open)	Stands alone
Grand Slams	1877	14 titles won on a single surface (Clay)	Novak Djokovic (Hard)
Grand Slams	1877	14 finals at a single major (French Open)	Stands alone
Grand Slams	1877	112 match wins on clay court (French Open)	Stands alone
Grand Slams	1877	10 title defences (2006–08, 2011–14, 2018–2020)	Roger Federer
Grand Slams	1877	10 title defences at a single major (French Open)	Stands alone
Grand Slams	1877	10 consecutive years winning 1+ major (2005–2014)	Stands alone
Grand Slams	1877	15 years winning 1+ major (2005–2014, 2017–2020, 2022)	Stands alone
Grand Slams	1877	2 streaks of 5+ consecutive finals won across non-consecutive tournaments	Stands alone
Grand Slams	1877	2 streaks of 10+ consecutive quarterfinals or better	Stands alone
Grand Slams	1877	3 streaks of 4+ consecutive titles at a single major	Stands alone
Grand Slams	1877	3 streaks of 30+ consecutive match wins at any major	Roger Federer; Novak Djokovic
Grand Slams	1877	3 streaks of 30+ consecutive match wins at the same major	Stands alone
Grand Slams	1877	3+ majors won in three separate decades (2000s - 6, 2010s - 13, 2020s - 3)	Stands alone
Grand Slams	1877	2+ majors won in three separate decades	Stands alone
Grand Slams	1877	Won the same major 2+ times in three separate decades (French Open) (2000s – 4, 2010s – 8, 2020s – 2)	Stands alone
Grand Slams	1978	Most combined hard court (6) and clay court (14) majors - 20	Stands alone
Grand Slams	1925	Most combined grass court (2) and clay court (14) majors - 16	Stands alone
Grand Slams	1925	4 French–US title doubles (2010, 2013, 2017, 2019)	Stands alone
Grand Slams	1877	4 majors won without losing a set (2008, 2010, 2017, 2020)	Stands alone
Grand Slams	1877	2+ majors won without losing a set at a single major	Björn Borg
Grand Slams	1877	8 majors won while losing no more than one set (Note: Nadal won the 2007–08, 2010, 2012, 2017–2018, and 2020 French Open events and the 2010 US Open while losing no more than one set.)	Stands alone
Grand Slams	1877	6 majors won with the final set score of either 6–0 or 6–1 (Note: Nadal won the 2008, 2011, 2017, 2019, and 2022 French Open events and the 2013 US Open with the final set score of either 6–0 or 6–1.)	Stands alone
Grand Slams	1877	Longest Grand Slam final by duration (5 hours 53 minutes at 2012 Australian Open)	Novak Djokovic
1968	1877	16 semifinals won spanning non-consecutive tournaments	Stands alone
1973	1877	Defeated four Top-10 players en route to a title	Mats Wilander; Roger Federer
All Tournaments / ATP Tour	2009	Clay Slam: Won Monte Carlo, Madrid, Rome, and French Open in a calendar year (2010)	Stands alone
All Tournaments / ATP Tour	1899	Summer Slam: Won Canada, Cincinnati, and US Open in a calendar year (2013)	Patrick Rafter (1998); Andy Roddick (2003)
All Tournaments / ATP Tour	2009	Completed both Calendar sweeps Clay Slam and Summer Slam	Stands alone
All Tournaments / ATP Tour	1970	Overall clay court match-winning percentage of 90.47% (484–51)	Stands alone
All Tournaments / ATP Tour	1970	Overall outdoor match-winning percentage of 84.33% (985–183)	Stands alone
All Tournaments / ATP Tour	1970	985 outdoor match wins	Stands alone
All Tournaments / ATP Tour	1970	Most combined grass court (4) and clay court (63) titles - 67	Stands alone
All Tournaments / ATP Tour	1970	90 outdoor titles	Stands alone
All Tournaments / ATP Tour	1970	63 clay-court titles	Stands alone
All Tournaments / ATP Tour	1877	12+ titles at 2 tournaments (14 French Open and 12 Barcelona)	Herbert Roper Barrett; Jean Borotra
All Tournaments / ATP Tour	1877	11+ titles at 3 tournaments (14 French Open, 12 Barcelona, and 11 Monte Carlo)	Jean Borotra
All Tournaments / ATP Tour	1877	10+ titles at 4 tournaments (14 French Open, 12 Barcelona, 11 Monte Carlo, and 10 Rome)	Stands alone
All Tournaments / ATP Tour	1877	37 titles won from 3 tournaments (14 French Open, 12 Barcelona, and 11 Monte Carlo)	Stands alone
All Tournaments / ATP Tour	1970	30 titles won without losing a set (Clay - 26 and hard - 4)	Stands alone
All Tournaments / ATP Tour	1877	40 clay-court Big Titles won	Stands alone
All Tournaments / ATP Tour	1877	26 clay-court titles won without losing a set	Stands alone
All Tournaments / ATP Tour	1968	18 consecutive years winning 2+ titles (2005–2022)	Novak Djokovic
All Tournaments / ATP Tour	1930	3 consecutive years winning Monte Carlo, Rome, and French Open (2005–2007)	Stands alone
All Tournaments / ATP Tour	1897	4 consecutive years winning Monte Carlo and French Open (2005–2008)	Stands alone
All Tournaments / ATP Tour	1973	23 match wins against world No. 1 players	Stands alone
All Tournaments / ATP Tour	1973	13 year-end Top-2 finishes	Stands alone
All Tournaments / ATP Tour	1973	15 year-end Top-4 finishes	Roger Federer; Novak Djokovic
All Tournaments / ATP Tour	1973	16 year-end Top-5 finishes	Roger Federer; Novak Djokovic
All Tournaments / ATP Tour	1973	18 year-end Top-10 finishes	Roger Federer; Novak Djokovic
All Tournaments / ATP Tour	1973	18 consecutive year-end Top-10 finishes	Stands alone
All Tournaments / ATP Tour	1973	912 consecutive weeks in the Top 10 (25 April 2005 – 19 March 2023))	Stands alone
ATP Finals	1970	16 consecutive years qualifying for the ATP Finals (2005–2020)	Stands alone
ATP Masters 1000	1990	11 titles won at a single tournament - Monte Carlo	Stands alone
ATP Masters 1000	1990	12 finals contested at a single tournament - Monte Carlo and Rome	Stands alone
ATP Masters 1000	1990	8 consecutive titles at a single tournament (2005–12) - Monte Carlo	Stands alone
ATP Masters 1000	1990	46 consecutive match wins at a single tournament (2005–13) - Monte Carlo	Stands alone
ATP Masters 1000	1990	73 match wins at a single tournament - Monte Carlo	Stands alone
ATP Masters 1000	1990	79 matches played at a single tournament - Monte Carlo	Roger Federer
ATP Masters 1000	1990	9 title defences at a single tournament - Monte Carlo	Stands alone
ATP Masters 1000	1990	20 entries at a single tournament - Madrid	Stands alone
ATP Masters 1000	1990	10 consecutive years winning 1+ title (2005–2014)	Stands alone
ATP Masters 1000	1990	10 consecutive years winning 1+ clay court title (2005–2014)	Stands alone
ATP Masters 1000	1990	15 years winning 1+ title (2005–2014, 2016–2019, 2021)	Novak Djokovic
ATP Masters 1000	1990	20+ finals reached on two different surfaces (Hard - 20, clay - 33)	Stands alone
ATP Masters 1000	1990	15 consecutive years of 1+ appearance in finals (2005–2019)	Novak Djokovic
ATP Masters 1000	1990	26 clay-court titles overall	Stands alone
ATP Masters 1000	1990	10+ titles at two tournaments (11 Monte Carlo & 10 Rome)	Stands alone
ATP Masters 1000	1990	10+ titles on both clay and hard courts (Clay - 26, hard - 10)	Novak Djokovic
ATP Masters 1000	1990	Record holder of most titles won at 4 different Masters tournaments (11 Monte Carlo, 10 Rome, 5 Madrid and 5 Canada)	Novak Djokovic
ATP Masters 1000	1990	Record holder of most titles won at 4 different Masters tournaments across 2 surfaces (Hard: Canada & clay: Monte Carlo, Rome, Madrid)	Novak Djokovic
ATP Masters 1000	1990	5+ titles at 4 different tournaments (11 Monte Carlo, 10 Rome, 5 Madrid and 5 Canada)	Novak Djokovic
ATP Masters 1000	1990	5+ titles at 3 clay-court tournaments (11 Monte Carlo, 10 Rome, and 5 Madrid)	Stands alone
ATP Masters 1000	1990	7 years winning Monte Carlo and Rome (2005–2007, 2009–2010, 2012 & 2018)	Stands alone
ATP 500 Series	1990	12 titles won at a single tournament - Barcelona	Stands alone
ATP 500 Series	1990	14 consecutive years winning 1+ title (2005–2018)	Stands alone
ATP 500 Series	1990	15 titles won without losing a set	Stands alone
ATP 500 Series	1990	66 match wins at a single tournament – Barcelona	Stands alone
ATP 500 Series	1990	41 consecutive match wins at a single tournament – Barcelona	Stands alone
ATP 500 Series	1990	70 matches played at a single tournament – Barcelona	Stands alone
ATP 500 Series	1990	Won titles at 8 ATP different 500 series tournaments (Rio de Janeiro, Acapulco, Dubai, Barcelona, Hamburg, Beijing, Tokyo, and Stuttgart)	Stands alone
French Open	1891	14 men's singles titles	Stands alone
French Open	1891	14 finals overall (2005–08, 2010–14, 2017–2020, 2022)	Stands alone
French Open	1891	5 consecutive titles won (2010–14)	Stands alone
French Open	1891	39 match win streak (2010–15)	Stands alone
French Open	1891	112 match wins	Stands alone
French Open	1891	96.6% match-winning percentage	Stands alone
French Open	1891	4 titles won without losing a set (2008, 2010, 2017, 2020)	Stands alone
French Open	1891	2+ titles in three separate decades (2000s - 4, 2010s - 8, 2020s - 2)	Stands alone
French Open	1891	1+ title in three separate decades (2000s - 4, 2010s - 8, 2020s - 2)	Stands alone
Australian Open	1905	Longest final by duration (5 hours 53 minutes)	Novak Djokovic
Monte-Carlo; Masters	1897	11 men's singles titles	Stands alone
Monte-Carlo; Masters	1897	12 finals overall (2005–2013, 2016–2018)	Stands alone
Monte-Carlo; Masters	1897	8 consecutive titles (2005–2012)	Stands alone
Monte-Carlo; Masters	1897	9 consecutive finals (2005–2013)	Stands alone
Monte-Carlo; Masters	1897	5 titles without dropping a set (2007–08, 2010, 2012, 2018)	Stands alone
Monte-Carlo; Masters	1897	46 match win streak (2005–2013)	Stands alone
Monte-Carlo; Masters	1897	79 matches played (2005–2021)	Stands alone
Monte-Carlo; Masters	1897	73 matches wins (2005–2021)	Stands alone
Monte-Carlo; Masters	1897	17 editions played (2003–2021)	Fabrice Santoro
Barcelona Open	1953	12 men's singles titles	Stands alone
Barcelona Open	1953	12 finals (2005–09, 2011–13, 2016–18, 2021)	Stands alone
Barcelona Open	1953	5 consecutive titles (2005–2009)	Stands alone
Barcelona Open	1953	3 three-peats (2005–09, 2011–13, 2016–18)	Stands alone
Barcelona Open	1953	9 titles without dropping a set (2005, 2007, 2009, 2011–13, 2016–18)	Stands alone
Italian Open	1930	10 men's singles titles	Stands alone
Italian Open	1930	12 finals overall (2005–2007, 2009–2014, 2018–2019, 2021)	Novak Djokovic
Italian Open	1930	3 consecutive titles (2005–2007)	Stands alone
Italian Open	1930	6 consecutive finals (2009–2014)	Stands alone
Italian Open	1930	77 matches played (2005–2021)	Stands alone
Italian Open	1930	69 match wins (2005–2021)	Stands alone
Italian Open	1930	17 consecutive match wins (2005–2007)	Stands alone
Madrid Open	2002	5 men's singles titles	Stands alone
Madrid Open	2002	8 finals overall (2005, 2009–11, 2013–15, 2017)	Stands alone
Madrid Open	2002	2 consecutive titles (2013–2014)	Stands alone
Madrid Open	2002	3 consecutive finals (2009–2011 & 2013–2015)	Stands alone
Mexican Open	1993	4 men's singles titles	David Ferrer; Thomas Muster
Mexican Open	1993	5 finals (2005, 2013, 2017, 2020, 2022)	David Ferrer
Mexican Open	1993	4 titles without dropping a set (2005, 2013, 2020, 2022)	Stands alone

== Grand Slam tournament records ==
- These records were attained in the Open Era of tennis, since 1968.
- Records in italics are currently active streaks.

Grand Slams	Year(s)	Record accomplished	Player tied
Australian Open; French Open; Wimbledon; US Open; Olympics	2008, 2010	Career Golden Slam: Won all four majors and the Olympic gold medal in singles	Andre Agassi; Novak Djokovic
Australian Open; French Open; Wimbledon; US Open; Olympics	2008, 2010, 2016	Career Golden Slam + Olympic doubles gold medal	Stands alone
French Open; Wimbledon; US Open	2010	Surface Slam: Won majors on clay, grass, and hard courts in a calendar year	Novak Djokovic
French Open; Wimbledon; US Open	2010	Won French Open, Wimbledon, and US Open in a calendar year	Don Budge; Tony Trabert; Rod Laver
French Open; Wimbledon	2008, 2010	Double Channel Slam: Won French-Wimbledon title double in a calendar year twice	Rod Laver; Björn Borg
French Open; Wimbledon; Olympics	2008	Simultaneous holder of Olympic singles gold medal and Wimbledon	Andy Murray
French Open; Wimbledon; Olympics	2008	Winner of Olympic singles gold medal and two majors in a single season	Stands alone
French Open; Wimbledon; Olympics	2008	Winner of Olympic singles gold medal and majors on clay and grass courts in a single season	Stands alone
French Open; Wimbledon; Olympics	2008	Youngest male player to achieve a Career Golden Slam (24)	Stands alone
Australian Open; French Open; US Open	2005–2022	6+ majors on both hard and clay courts	Stands alone
French Open	2008, 2010, 2017, 2020	4 majors won without losing a set	Stands alone
Australian Open; French Open; US Open	2007–2008, 2010, 2012, 2017, 2019, 2020	8 finals reached without losing a set	Stands alone
Australian Open French Open; Wimbledon; US Open	2005–2009	8 finals reached before by age 23	Björn Borg; Boris Becker; Carlos Alcaraz
Australian Open French Open; Wimbledon; US Open	2005–2009	10 semi finals reached before age 23	Björn Borg; Boris Becker; Carlos Alcaraz
French Open; US Open	2010, 2013, 2017, 2019	Won French-US title double in a single season four times	Stands alone
French Open	2005–2008, 2010–2014, 2017–2020, 2022	14 titles won at a single major - French Open	Stands alone
French Open	2005–2008, 2010–2014, 2017–2020, 2022	14 finals contested at a single major - French Open	Stands alone
French Open - French Open	2005–2014, 2017–2020, 2022	15 years winning 1+ major	Stands alone
French Open - French Open	2005–2014	10 consecutive years winning 1+ major	Stands alone
French Open - French Open	2005–2020	10 title defences at majors	Roger Federer
French Open - French Open	2005–2020	10 title defences at a single major	Stands alone
Wimbledon - Australian Open	2011–2012	3 consecutive runner-up finishes	Stands alone
French Open - French Open	2005–2022	Won a major in teens, twenties, and thirties	Ken Rosewall; Pete Sampras
French Open - Australian Open	2020–2021	11 consecutive match wins without losing a set	Roger Federer; John McEnroe
French Open	2022	4 match wins vs. Top-10 players in one tournament	Mats Wilander; Roger Federer

== Records at each Grand Slam tournament ==
- These records were attained in the Open Era of tennis, since 1968.
- Records in italics are currently active streaks.

Tournament	Year(s)	Record accomplished	Players tied
Australian Open	2012	Longest final by duration (5 hours 53 minutes)	Novak Djokovic
Australian Open	2022	Won an Australian Open final from two sets down	Jannik Sinner
Australian Open	2009–2022	12-year gap between first and last title wins	Stands alone
French Open	2005–2008, 2010–2014, 2017–2020, 2022	14 men's singles titles	Stands alone
French Open	2005–2008, 2010–2014, 2017–2020, 2022	14 finals	Stands alone
French Open	2010–2014	5 consecutive titles	Stands alone
French Open	2010–2014	5 consecutive finals	Stands alone
French Open	2005–2022	15 semifinals	Stands alone
French Open	2005–2022	6 consecutive semifinals	Novak Djokovic
French Open	2005–2022	112 match wins	Stands alone
French Open	2005–2022	16-year gap between first and last title wins	Stands alone
French Open	2005–2022	1+ title in three separate decades (2000s - 4, 2010s - 8, 2020s - 2)	Stands alone
French Open	2005–2022	2+ titles in three separate decades (2000s - 4, 2010s - 8, 2020s - 2)	Stands alone
French Open	2010–2015	39 consecutive match wins	Stands alone
French Open	2005–2022	Highest match winning percentage - 96.55% (112–4)	Stands alone
French Open	2008, 2010, 2017, 2020	4 titles won without losing a set	Stands alone
French Open	2007–2020	6 finals reached without losing a set	Stands alone
French Open	2005	Won title on the first attempt	Mats Wilander
US Open	2013	Won as a US Open Series Champion	Roger Federer
US Open	2017	Won a US Open final without facing a break point	Stands alone
US Open	2017, 2019	Won 2 titles after turning 30 years old	Jimmy Connors Novak Djokovic
US Open	2010–2019	Highest finals winning percentage - 80% (4–1) (minimum 4 finals reached)	John McEnroe

- Nadal is the first player in history to win 14 titles at the same major.
- Nadal is the first player in history to be undefeated in at least the first 10 Grand Slam finals at the same major – he holds a 14–0 record in French Open finals.
  - Only other player in history to have remained undefeated in at least 10 Grand Slam finals is Novak Djokovic, with a 10–0 record at the Australian Open. Which is now 10-1 after a loss to Carlos Alcaraz in the 2026 Australian Open finals.

== ATP Masters records ==
- Grand Prix Championship Series began in 1970.
- ATP Championship Series was introduced in 1990.
- Renamed to ATP Tour Masters 1000 in 2019.

Year(s)	Record accomplished	Players tied
2005–2012, 2016–2018	11 titles won at a single tournament - Monte Carlo	Stands alone
2005–2014	10 consecutive years winning 1+ title	Stands alone
2005–2014	10 consecutive years winning 1+ clay-court title	Stands alone
2005–2021	10+ titles at two tournaments - 11 Monte Carlo, 10 Rome	Stands alone
2005–2010	4 tournaments won on clay (Monte Carlo, Hamburg, Rome and Madrid)	Stands alone
2005–2019	5+ titles at four tournaments - Monte Carlo, Rome, Madrid, Canada	Novak Djokovic
2005–2018	8 titles won without losing a set	Stands alone
2005–2007, 2009–2010, 2012, 2018	7 years winning Monte Carlo and Rome	Stands alone
2005–2021	26 clay-court titles	Stands alone
2005–2017	5+ titles at three clay tournaments	Stands alone
2005–2010, 2012–2013, 2017–2018	2+ clay-court titles in a calendar year	Stands alone
2005–2019	10+ titles on clay (26) and hard courts (10)	Novak Djokovic
2005–2022	20+ finals on clay (33) and hard courts (20)	Stands alone
2005–2019	15 consecutive years contesting 1+ final	Novak Djokovic
2005–2013	5 years reaching 5+ finals	Novak Djokovic
2005–2021	12 finals at a single tournament - Monte Carlo, Rome	Novak Djokovic
2005–2021	12 finals at two tournaments - Monte Carlo, Rome	Stands alone
2005–2021	9+ finals at three tournaments - 12 Monte Carlo, 12 Rome, 9 Madrid	Stands alone
2005, 2008, 2011, 2014, 2017	5 runners-up finishes at a single tournament without winning a title - Miami	Stands alone
2005–2022	Reached the finals of most (10) Masters tournaments	Roger Federer
2005–2022	Reached the final of all 9 Masters events	Ivan Lendl; Roger Federer; Novak Djokovic
2009	Reached quarterfinals, or better, in all 9 Masters events in a single season	Novak Djokovic
2009–2010	9 consecutive semi-finals	Stands alone
2013	8 semifinals reached in a single season	Novak Djokovic
2005–2022	99 quarterfinals	Stands alone
2008–2010	21 consecutive quarterfinals	Stands alone
2003–2024	Highest overall match win percentage - 82.0% (410–90)	Stands alone
2003–2024	70+ match wins at a single tournament - Monte Carlo 73	Stands alone
2003–2024	70+ match wins at two tournaments - Monte Carlo 73, Rome 70	Stands alone
2003–2024	50+ match wins at four tournaments - Monte Carlo 73, Rome 70, Indian Wells 59, Madrid 57	Stands alone
2013	3 North-American hard court tournaments in a calendar year - Indian Wells, Canada, Cincinnati	Novak Djokovic; Roger Federer
2013	Won Canada-Cincinnati title double consecutively	Patrick Rafter; Andy Roddick; Andre Agassi
2013	Won Indian Wells, Canada, and Cincinnati in a calendar year	Stands Alone
2008	Won both singles and doubles events at a single tournament in the same year - Monte Carlo	Jim Courier

- Andy Murray accomplished this feat at the Australian Open by finishing as the runner-up five times without winning a title.
- Novak Djokovic also reached the quarter-finals, or better, in all 9 Masters 1000 events of the year in 2009.
  - They met in 5 out of the 9 tournaments with Nadal winning 3 matches & Djokovic winning the other 2 matches.
  - Nadal prevailed in the Monte Carlo final, Madrid semifinal, and Rome final, while Djokovic bested him in the Cincinnati semifinal, and Paris semifinal, where he would go on to win the title.

== Records at each ATP 500 Series & ATP Masters 1000 tournaments ==
Tournament	Year(s)	Record accomplished	Players tied
Monte-Carlo Masters	2005–2012, 2016–2018	11 men's singles titles	Stands alone
Monte-Carlo Masters	2005–2012, 2016–2018	12 Finals overall	Stands alone
Monte-Carlo Masters	2005–2012, 2016–2018	14 Semi Finals	Stands alone
Monte-Carlo Masters	2005–2012	8 consecutive titles	Stands alone
Monte-Carlo Masters	2005–2013	9 consecutive finals	Stands alone
Monte-Carlo Masters	2007–08, 2010, 2012, 2018	5 titles without dropping a set	Stands alone
Monte-Carlo Masters	2005–2021	73 match wins	Stands alone
Monte-Carlo Masters	2005–2013	46 consecutive match wins	Stands alone
Monte-Carlo Masters	2005–2021	79 matches played	Stands alone
Monte-Carlo Masters	2003–2021	17 editions played	Fabrice Santoro Novak Djokovic
Rome Masters	2005–2007, 2009–2010, 2012–2013, 2018–2019, 2021	10 men's singles titles	Stands alone
Rome Masters	2005–2007, 2009–2011, 2012–2013, 2018–2019, 2021	12 Finals Overall	Novak Djokovic
Rome Masters	2005–2007	3 consecutive titles	Stands alone
Rome Masters	2009–2014	6 consecutive finals	Stands alone
Rome Masters	2005–2024	70 match wins	Stands alone
Rome Masters	2005–2007	17 consecutive match wins	Stands alone
Rome Masters	2005–2024	79 matches played	Stands alone
Rome Masters	2005–2024	19 editions played	Stands alone
Madrid Masters	2005 (indoor hard), 2010, 2013–2014, 2017	5 men's singles titles	Stands alone
Madrid Masters	2005 (indoor hard), 2009–11, 2013–15, 2017	8 finals overall	Stands alone
Madrid Masters	2013–2014	2 consecutive titles	Carlos Alcaraz
Madrid Masters	2009–2011 & 2013–2015	3 consecutive finals	Stands alone
Barcelona Open	2005–2009, 2011–2013, 2016–2018, 2021	12 men's singles titles	Stands alone
Barcelona Open	2005–2009, 2011–2013, 2016–2018, 2021	12 finals	Stands alone
Barcelona Open	2005–2009	5 consecutive titles	Stands alone
Barcelona Open	2005-2022	13 Semi Finals	Stands alone
Barcelona Open	2005-2022	72 Matches Played	Stands alone
Barcelona Open	2005-2022	67 match wins	Stands alone
Barcelona Open	2005, 2007, 2009, 2011–13, 2016–18	9 titles without dropping a set	Stands alone
Barcelona Open	2005–2009, 2011–2013, 2016–2018, 2021	Highest undefeated record in finals (12–0)	Stands alone
Barcelona Open	2005–2009, 2011–2013, 2016–2018, 2021	3 three-peats	Stands alone
Barcelona Open	2005-2022	93.1% Win Percentage	Stands alone
Barcelona Open	2005-2022	22 editions played	Feliciano Lopez
Mexican Open	2005, 2013, 2020, 2022	4 men's singles titles	David Ferrer; Thomas Muster
Mexican Open	2005, 2013, 2017, 2020, 2022	5 finals	David Ferrer
Mexican Open	2005, 2013, 2020, 2022	4 titles without dropping a set	Stands alone

- Nadal was the first player to win 25 Masters titles in the Open Era, he surpassed Ivan Lendl's record of 22 in 2013.
- Nadal was also the first player to win 35 ATP Masters titles, which he achieved in 2019.

== Rankings records and achievements ==
- The ATP ranking was frozen from 23 March to 23 August 2020

Time span	Record or achievement accomplished	Player tied
2008–2020	Ranked World No.1 in three decades - 2000s, 2010s, 2020s	Stands alone
2013–2017	Regained the year-end No. 1 crown 4+ years since the previous instance	Stands alone
2017	First man to finish as the year-end No. 1 in his 30s	Stands alone
2022	Oldest man to finish as the year-end No. 2	Stands alone
2005–2008	Most consecutive weeks at No. 2 (160)	Stands alone
2005–2022	Most year-end Top 2 finishes (13)	Stands alone
2005–2022	Most year-end Top 10 finishes (18)	Roger Federer; Novak Djokovic
2005–2022	Most consecutive weeks in the Top 10 (912) (25 Apr 2005–20 Mar 2023)	Stands alone
2005–2022	Most consecutive years in the Top 10 (18) (25 Apr 2005–20 Mar 2023)	Stands alone

Time span	Record or achievement accomplished	Open Era Ranking
2005–2022	596 weeks ranked in the Top 2; No. 1 (209), No. 2 (387)	2nd
2005–2022	686 weeks ranked in the Top 3; No. 1 (209), No. 2 (387), No. 3 (90)	3rd
2005–2022	756 weeks ranked in the Top 4; No. 1 (209), No. 2 (387), No. 3 (90), No 4 (70)	3rd
2005–2022	837 weeks ranked in the Top 5; No. 1 (209), No. 2 (387), No. 3 (90), No 4 (70), No. 5 (81)	3rd
2005–2022	912 weeks ranked in the Top 10; No. 1 (209), No. 2 (387), No. 3 (90), No 4 (70), No. 5 (81), No. 6 (31), No. 7 (15), No. 8 (8), No 9 (13), No. 10 (8)	3rd
2005–2022	5 year-end No. 1 finishes	3rd
2005–2022	13 year-end Top 2 finishes; No. 1 (5), No. 2 (8)	1st
2005–2022	14 year-end Top 3 finishes; No. 1 (5), No. 2 (8), No. 3 (1)	3rd
2005–2022	15 year-end Top 4 finishes; No. 1 (5), No. 2 (8), No. 3 (1), No. 4 (1)	2nd
2005–2022	16 year-end Top 5 finishes; No. 1 (5), No. 2 (8), No. 3 (1), No. 4 (1), No. 5 (1)	2nd
2005–2022	18 year-end Top 10 finishes; No. 1 (5), No. 2 (8), No. 3 (1), No. 4 (1), No. 5 (1), No. 6 (1), No. 9 (1)	Federer & Djokovic
2005–2022	18 consecutive year-end Top 10 finishes; No. 1 (5), No. 2 (8), No. 3 (1), No. 4 (1), No. 5 (1), No. 6 (1), No. 9 (1)	Stands alone

== Other significant records ==
Time span	Record accomplished	Player tied
2004–2022	500+ match wins on hard courts and 450+ match wins on clay courts: 518 on hard and 484 on clay	Stands alone
2008, 2016	Olympic gold medals in singles and doubles at two different Olympic Games: 2008 Beijing singles and 2016 Rio men's doubles	Stands alone
2008, 2016	Won two Olympic gold medals in the Open Era	Nicolás Massú; Andy Murray
2005–2022	Holder of most titles won at a single Grand Slam, Masters 1000 and ATP 500 series tournament: 14 French Open, 11 Monte Carlo, 12 Barcelona	Stands alone
2005–2022	90 outdoor titles	Stands alone
2005–2022	63 clay-court titles	Stands alone
2004–2022	25+ titles on hard and clay courts - 25 on hard and 63 on clay	Ivan Lendl
2013	35+ match wins on clay and hard courts in a calendar year	Stands alone
2005–2007	Longest single-surface win streak in the Open Era (81 on clay)	Stands alone
2008	32 consecutive match wins across 3 different surfaces	Stands alone
2004–2014	52 consecutive wins in semifinals on a single surface (clay)	Stands alone
2017–2018	50 consecutive sets won on a single surface (clay)	Stands alone
2005–2007	13 consecutive clay-court titles	Stands alone
2005–2008	18 consecutive clay-court finals	Stands alone
2004–2022	3+ titles in every tennis-playable continent in the Open Era	Stands alone
2005–2022	18 consecutive years winning 1+ ATP 500 series title	Stands alone
2010	5 consecutive Big Titles in a single season - Monte Carlo, Madrid, Rome, French Open, Wimbledon	Stands alone
2005–2006	5 consecutive ATP 500 series titles	Roger Federer
2010–2014	8 consecutive ATP 500 series finals	Stands alone
2006–2024	60 career meetings against the same opponent (Novak Djokovic)	Novak Djokovic
2006–2021	28 career finals against the same opponent (Novak Djokovic)	Novak Djokovic
2006–2017; 2010–2020	9 career major finals against the same opponent	Roger Federer; Novak Djokovic
2004–2021	23 match wins against world No. 1 players^{[h]}	Stands alone
2004–2006	16 titles won as a teenager (18 years - 6 titles, 19 years - 10 titles)	Björn Borg
2005	11 titles won in a single season as a teenager	Stands alone
2005	Won 24 consecutive matches as a teenager	Stands alone
2004–2006	Won 17 of his first 19 finals appearances (17–2)	Stands alone
2005, 2007, 2015	3 Stuttgart Open titles	Stands alone

- The only player to have lost just one game in an ATP Masters 1000 final (Monte Carlo 2010: 6–0, 6–1).
- The fastest to win ATP Masters Titles (since winning the first title):
  5 titles: 8 tournaments/1 year: Monte Carlo 2005 – Monte Carlo 2006
  10 titles: 24 tournaments/3 years: Monte Carlo 2005 – Monte Carlo 2008
  15 titles: 34 tournaments/4 years: Monte Carlo 2005 – Rome 2009
  20 titles: 58 tournaments/7 years: Monte Carlo 2005 – Monte Carlo 2012
  25 titles: 65 tournaments/8 years: Monte Carlo 2005 – Montreal 2013

== Guinness World Records ==
As of 2023, Nadal holds 21 Guinness World Records.

1. Most titles of one Grand Slam singles tennis tournament - 14 at French Open
2. Most French Open singles tennis titles won by a man - 14
3. Most wins of one Grand Slam singles tennis tournament (Open Era) - 14 at French Open
4. Most wins of one Grand Slam singles tennis tournament (Open Era, male) - 14 at French Open
5. Most singles finals played at one Grand Slam tennis tournament (Open Era) - 14 at French Open
6. Most wins of one singles tennis tournament (Open Era) - 14 at French Open
7. Most consecutive French Open singles tennis titles won by a man - 5
8. Most consecutive Grand Slam singles final losses by a man - 3
9. First player to win 10 singles titles at the same Grand Slam (Open Era)
10. First player to win 10 singles titles at the same ATP World Tour event (Open Era) - 11 at Monte-Carlo Masters
11. Most men’s ATP titles won outdoors - 90
12. Most years winning an ATP title - 19
13. Most consecutive years winning an ATP title - 19
14. Most clay-court singles titles (Open Era) - 63
15. Most tennis singles matches on clay won consecutively (Male) - 81
16. Most consecutive sets won on a single surface - 50 on clay
17. First players to win all four tennis Grand Slams together - 2013 with Serena Williams
18. Longest Grand Slam tennis final - with Novak Djokovic at the 2012 Australian Open
19. Most ATP Tour singles matches between two players (Open Era) - 60 with Novak Djokovic
20. Most tennis Grand Slam meetings (Singles) - 18 with Novak Djokovic

== Wins over No. 1 players ==
Nadal holds the record for most wins against No. 1-ranked players, 23. With his win in the final of the 2019 Italian Open – Men's Singles over Djokovic, he broke a long-standing tie with Boris Becker. He recorded 13 wins over Roger Federer and 10 wins over Novak Djokovic. Nadal recorded his first win over a No. 1-ranked player when he was only 17 years, 9 months and 25 days, and ranked No. 34, when he beat Federer in straight sets in the third round of the 2004 Miami Open.

#	Player	Event	Surface	Rd	Score
1.	(Switzerland) Roger Federer	2004 Miami, United States	Hard	3R	6–3, 6–3
2.	(Switzerland) Roger Federer	2005 French Open, Paris, France	Clay	SF	6–3, 4–6, 6–4, 6–3
3.	(Switzerland) Roger Federer	2006 Dubai, United Arab Emirates	Hard	F	2–6, 6–4, 6–4
4.	(Switzerland) Roger Federer	2006 Monte Carlo, Monaco	Clay	F	6–2, 6–7^{(2–7)}, 6–3, 7–6^{(7–5)}
5.	(Switzerland) Roger Federer	2006 Rome, Italy	Clay	F	6–7^{(0–7)}, 7–6^{(7–5)}, 6–4, 2–6, 7–6^{(7–5)}
6.	(Switzerland) Roger Federer	2006 French Open, Paris, France	Clay	F	1–6, 6–1, 6–4, 7–6^{(7–4)}
7.	(Switzerland) Roger Federer	2007 Monte Carlo, Monaco	Clay	F	6–4, 6–4
8.	(Switzerland) Roger Federer	2007 French Open, Paris, France	Clay	F	6–3, 4–6, 6–3, 6–4
9.	(Switzerland) Roger Federer	2008 Monte Carlo, Monaco	Clay	F	7–5, 7–5
10.	(Switzerland) Roger Federer	2008 Hamburg, Germany	Clay	F	7–5, 6–7^{(3–7)}, 6–3
11.	(Switzerland) Roger Federer	2008 French Open, Paris, France	Clay	F	6–1, 6–3, 6–0
12.	(Switzerland) Roger Federer	2008 Wimbledon, London, England	Grass	F	6–4, 6–4, 6–7^{(5–7)}, 6–7^{(8–10)}, 9–7
13.	(Switzerland) Roger Federer	2010 Madrid, Spain	Clay	F	6–4, 7–6^{(7–5)}
14.	(Serbia) Novak Djokovic	2012 Monte Carlo, Monaco	Clay	F	6–3, 6–1
15.	(Serbia) Novak Djokovic	2012 Rome, Italy	Clay	F	7–5, 6–3
16.	(Serbia) Novak Djokovic	2012 French Open, Paris, France	Clay	F	6–4, 6–3, 2–6, 7–5
17.	(Serbia) Novak Djokovic	2013 French Open, Paris, France	Clay	SF	6–4, 3–6, 6–1, 6–7^{(3–7)}, 9–7
18.	(Serbia) Novak Djokovic	2013 Montreal, Canada	Hard	SF	6–4, 3–6, 7–6^{(7–2)}
19.	(Serbia) Novak Djokovic	2013 US Open, New York, United States	Hard	F	6–2, 3–6, 6–4, 6–1
20.	(Serbia) Novak Djokovic	2019 Rome, Italy	Clay	F	6–0, 4–6, 6–1
21.	(Serbia) Novak Djokovic	2020 French Open, Paris, France	Clay	F	6–0, 6–2, 7–5
22.	(Serbia) Novak Djokovic	2021 Italian Open, Rome, Italy	Clay	F	7–5, 1–6, 6–3
23.	(Serbia) Novak Djokovic	2022 French Open, Paris, France	Clay	QF	6–2, 4–6, 6–2, 7–6 ^{(7–4)}

== Awards and honours ==
- ATP Player of the Year^{†} (5): 2008, 2010, 2013, 2017, 2019
- ITF World Champion (5): 2008, 2010, 2017, 2019, 2022
- Davis Cup Most Valuable Player: 2019
- Laureus World Sports Award for Breakthrough of the Year: 2006
- Laureus World Sports Award for Sportsman of the Year (2): 2011, 2021
- Laureus World Sports Award for Comeback of the Year: 2014
- Best Male Tennis Player ESPY Award (3): 2011, 2014, 2022
- L'Équipe Champion of Champions (4): 2010, 2013, 2017, 2019
- US Open Series Champion (2): 2008, 2013
  - One of two men, alongside Roger Federer, to win the Series and the US Open in the same year.
  - One of three men, alongside Andy Roddick and Andy Murray, to win the Series two times.
- ATP Newcomer of the Year^{†}: 2003
- ATP Most Improved Player^{†}: 2005
- Stefan Edberg Sportsmanship Award^{†} (5): 2010, 2018, 2019, 2020, 2021
- Arthur Ashe Humanitarian of the Year^{†}: 2011
- ATP Comeback Player of the Year^{†}: 2013
- ATP Fan's Favourite^{†}: 2022
- European Sportsperson of the Year (2): 2008, 2010
- BBC Sports Personality World Sport Star of the Year: 2010
- Time 100 Most Influential People: 2022
- Forbes list of the world's top-10 highest-paid athletes: 2014
- Esquire Man of the Year: 2022
- Marca Legend Award: 2008
- Marca 75th Anniversary Legend Award: 2013
- Diario AS Sports Award (6): 2010, 2017, 2020, 2022
- Spanish National Sports Awards (3): 2006, 2008, 2017
- Princess of Asturias Award: 2008
- Medal of the City of Paris: 2015
- Gold Medal of Merit in Labour: 2015
- Guardia Civil Silver Medal for Merit: 2019
- Grand Cross of Royal Order of Sports Merit: 2020
- Grand Cross of Order of the Second of May: 2020
- Grand Cross of Naval Merit: 2022
- Instituto Franklin-UAH Camino Real Award: 2022
- Davis Cup Commitment Award: 2024

† – Nadal is the only man to win every ATP award in the player category.

== See also ==
- List of career achievements by Roger Federer
- List of career achievements by Novak Djokovic
- List of career achievements by Andy Murray

== Notes ==
Sporting positions
Preceded by Roger Federer; Roger Federer; Novak Djokovic; Andy Murray; Roger Federer; Roger Federer; Roger Federer; Novak Djokovic	World No. 1 August 18, 2008 – July 5, 2009; June 7, 2010 – July 3, 2011; October 7, 2013 – July 6, 2014; August 21, 2017 – February 18, 2018; April 2, 2018 – May 13, 2018; May 21, 2018 – June 17, 2018; June 25, 2018 – November 4, 2018; November 6, 2019 – February 3, 2020	Succeeded by Roger Federer; Novak Djokovic; Novak Djokovic; Roger Federer; Roger Federer; Roger Federer; Novak Djokovic; Novak Djokovic
Preceded by Roger Federer; Novak Djokovic	US Open Series Champion; 2008; 2013	Succeeded by Sam Querrey; Milos Raonic
Awards
Preceded by Paul-Henri Mathieu	ATP Newcomer of the Year; 2003	Succeeded by Florian Mayer
Preceded by Joachim Johansson	ATP Most Improved Player of the Year; 2005	Succeeded by Novak Djokovic
Preceded by Fernando Alonso; Rafael Trujillo; Saúl Craviotto	Spanish Sportsman of the Year; 2006; 2008; 2017	Succeeded by Rafael Trujillo; Xavi; Regino Hernández & Alejandro Valverde
Preceded by Roger Federer; Roger Federer; Novak Djokovic; Andy Murray; Novak Djokovic	ATP Player of the Year; 2008; 2010; 2013; 2017; 2019	Succeeded by Roger Federer; Novak Djokovic; Novak Djokovic; Novak Djokovic; Incumbent
Preceded by Roger Federer; Roger Federer; Andy Murray; Novak Djokovic; Novak Djokovic	ITF World Champion; 2008; 2010; 2017; 2019; 2022	Succeeded by Roger Federer; Novak Djokovic; Novak Djokovic — Incumbent
Preceded by Michael Schumacher	Princess of Asturias Award for Sports; 2008	Succeeded by Yelena Isinbayeva
Preceded by Roger Federer; Roger Federer	ATP Stefan Edberg Sportsmanship Award; 2010; 2018 – 2021	Succeeded by Roger Federer; Casper Ruud
Preceded by Usain Bolt	BBC Sports Personality World Sport Star of the Year; 2010	Succeeded by Novak Djokovic
Preceded by Usain Bolt; Usain Bolt; Usain Bolt; Marcel Hirscher	L'Équipe Champion of Champions; 2010; 2013; 2017 (with Roger Federer); 2019	Succeeded by Lionel Messi; Renaud Lavillenie; Marcel Hirscher; Lewis Hamilton
Preceded by Roger Federer; Roger Federer	European Sportsperson of the Year; 2008; 2010	Succeeded by Roger Federer; Novak Djokovic
Preceded by Juan Carlos I	Marca Legend Award; 2008	Succeeded by Raúl
Preceded by Usain Bolt; Lewis Hamilton & Lionel Messi	Laureus World Sportsman of the Year; 2011; 2021	Succeeded by Novak Djokovic; Max Verstappen
Preceded by Roger Federer; Novak Djokovic; Novak Djokovic	Best Male Tennis Player ESPY Award; 2011; 2014; 2022	Succeeded by Novak Djokovic; Novak Djokovic; Incumbent
Preceded by Rohan Bopanna & Aisam-ul-Haq Qureshi	Arthur Ashe Humanitarian of the Year; 2011	Succeeded by Novak Djokovic
Preceded by Tommy Haas	ATP Comeback Player of the Year; 2013	Succeeded by David Goffin
Preceded by Félix Sánchez	Laureus World Comeback of the Year; 2014	Succeeded by Schalk Burger
Preceded by Liu Xiang	Laureus World Breakthrough of the Year; 2006	Succeeded by Amélie Mauresmo
Olympic Games
Preceded by Pau Gasol	Flagbearer for Spain; Rio de Janeiro 2016	Succeeded by Mireia Belmonte & Saúl Craviotto
