= List of career achievements by Novak Djokovic =

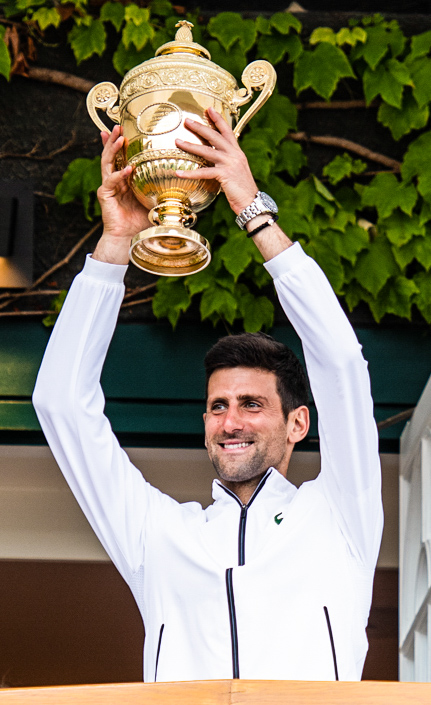
Djokovic holding the 2019 Wimbledon Championships trophy.

This article lists various career, tournament, and seasonal achievements by Serbian tennis player Novak Djokovic.

Djokovic has won an all-time record 24 Grand Slam singles titles. He has been the world No. 1 for a record total 428 weeks in a record 13 different years, and the year-end world No. 1 a record eight times. Djokovic is the only man in tennis history to be the reigning champion of all four majors at once across all three different surfaces and the only one to achieve a triple Career Grand Slam by winning all four majors at least three times. He has won a record 72 Big Titles, winning all four Grand Slams tournaments, all nine ATP Masters tournaments, the Year-end Championships and Olympic Gold, completing both the Career Golden Slam and Career Super Slam. Djokovic is widely regarded by sports analysts, tennis players and media pundits as one of the greatest tennis players of all time.

In addition to his winning records at majors, Djokovic has reached 38 Grand Slam finals, playing at least seven finals at each major and winning at least 95 matches at each major, all of which are all-time records. He also had a record five different winning streaks of 26 or more matches at majors with 30 being the longest (2015–16), an Open Era record.

Djokovic has won a record 40 ATP Masters titles. By 2018, he had won Masters titles across all nine tournaments, becoming the first player to achieve the Career Golden Masters. As a result, he is considered the most accomplished player in ATP Masters history for his versatility and success in winning Masters events on a consistent basis. Moreover, Djokovic has won a record seven Year-end Championship titles, including a record streak of four titles from 2012 to 2015.

Djokovic's 2011 season is considered one of the greatest seasons by a tennis player ever. Djokovic won 10 titles across all three different surfaces and defeated Rafael Nadal and Roger Federer a total of 10 times collectively with a match record of 10–1 against them. Djokovic went on a 41-match win streak and set a then-record of 5 Masters titles won in a season. In 2015, Djokovic won three majors in a season for the second time, improved his record of most Masters won in a season by claiming six titles, and finished the year by winning his fourth consecutive Year-end Championships title. Djokovic also made the finals of all elite tournaments he played in 2015, winning a season-record 10 Big Titles across all surfaces and setting a rankings record of 16,950 points while defeating a record 31 Top-10 players in the season.

Djokovic is unanimously regarded as the greatest hardcourt player ever. He has won a record 50 Big Titles on hardcourts, including the most Majors, most Masters and most Year-end Championship titles. With his 7 Wimbledon titles, Djokovic is also regarded as one of the greatest players on grass courts in history. Besides hard courts and grass courts, Djokovic has won 21 titles on clay, including three French Open titles, Olympic gold and 11 Masters titles, the latter of which is second only to Nadal's record of 26. Djokovic is one of three players, along with Robin Söderling and Alexander Zverev, to defeat Nadal at Roland Garros and the only one to do so twice. He is the only player to defeat Nadal in all three clay-court Masters events and the one who ended Nadal's consecutive run of 8 Monte Carlo titles in the 2013 final.

Djokovic is the only player to win at least 3 majors across all three different surfaces (hard, clay and grass) and the only player to hold all major titles at once across the three surfaces. He is also the only player to win 6 Big Titles or more at one tournament on the three surfaces, the Australian Open being the most notable on hardcourts (outdoors), Wimbledon on grass, the Italian Open on clay, and the Year-end Championship on hardcourts (indoors).

Djokovic holds the records for most victories against top 10 and top 5 players. Furthermore, he has won a record 62 titles by defeating multiple top 10 players and a record 25 titles by defeating multiple top 5 players en route. He has been part of the two most prolific rivalries in the Open Era, versus Rafael Nadal and Roger Federer, with him having a winning head-to-head record against them. He is the only player to defeat Nadal and Federer in all four Grand Slam tournaments, and the only one to defeat them at their most successful major tournament more than once. Djokovic has scored 20 or more victories against a record seven different players; Nadal, Federer, Murray, Wawrinka, Berdych, Monfils, Cilic. In 2011, Djokovic had the most dominant record versus a world No. 1 during a single season, going 5–0 against Nadal before overtaking him as No. 1.

== All-time records ==
- These records were attained since the amateur era of tennis, beginning 1877.

Event	Since	Record accomplished	Player(s) tied
ATP Tour	1970	Big Title Sweep (Note: Won all Big Titles of the annual tennis calendar in his career (twice).)	Stands alone
ATP Tour	1970	Multiple champion at all 14 annual elite tournaments	Stands alone
ATP Tour	1970	Champion of all four Majors and Year-end Championship simultaneously	Stands alone
ATP Tour	1970	Career Super Slam (winning all four Majors, the Year-end Championship and the Olympic gold medal)	Andre Agassi
ATP Tour	1970	72 Big Titles won	Stands alone
ATP Tour	1970	Won all four Majors and the Year-end Championship in both his 20s and 30s	Stands alone
ATP Tour	1970	6+ Big Titles at one tournament on hard, clay, grass and indoors (Note: Australian Open, Italian Open, Wimbledon, and the Year-end Championship respectively.)	Stands alone
ATP Tour	1970	10 Big Titles in a season (2015)	Stands alone
ATP Tour	1970	18 Big finals in a row	Stands alone
ATP Tour	1970	11 years winning 4+ Big Titles	Stands alone
ATP Tour	1970	73 titles on hardcourts	Stands alone
ATP Tour	1970	15 straight finals reached in a season (2015)	Stands alone
ATP Tour	1970	Most match wins against Top-10 players (269)	Stands alone
ATP Tour	1970	Most match wins against Top-5 players (130)	Stands alone
ATP Tour	1970	31 match wins against Top-10 opponents in a season (2015)	Stands alone
ATP Tour	1970	Defeated all Top-10 players in a season (2015)	Stands alone
ATP Tour	1970	21 consecutive seasons winning at least one singles title	Stands alone
Grand Slams	1877	24 Grand Slam singles titles	Stands alone
Grand Slams	1877	Triple Career Grand Slam (Note: Won each of the four Grand Slams at least three times.)	Stands alone
Grand Slams	1877	Champion of all Grand Slam titles at once	Don Budge; Rod Laver
Grand Slams	1877	Champion of all four Majors at once across all three different surfaces (Note: Clay, grass and hardcourts.)	Stands alone
Grand Slams	1877	7+ titles at two majors with two distinct surfaces (hard & grass)	Stands alone
Grand Slams	1877	Surface Slam (Note: Won Grand Slam titles across all three surfaces in a single season.) (major titles across all three surfaces in a season)	Rafael Nadal
Grand Slams	1877	4 streaks of 3+ consecutive Grand Slam titles	Stands alone
Grand Slams	1877	7 seasons winning multiple Grand Slam titles	Stands alone
Grand Slams	1877	38 Grand Slam singles finals	Stands alone
Grand Slams	1877	55 Grand Slam singles semifinals	Stands alone
Grand Slams	1877	66 Grand Slam singles quarterfinals	Stands alone
Grand Slams	1877	7+ finals at each Grand Slam	Stands alone
Grand Slams	1877	3+ consecutive finals at each Grand Slam	Stands alone
Grand Slams	1877	13+ semifinals at each Grand Slam	Stands alone
Grand Slams	1877	14+ quarterfinals at each Grand Slam	Stands alone
Grand Slams	1877	5 winning streaks of 26+ Grand Slam matches	Stands alone
Grand Slams	1877	30 consecutive Grand Slam matches across all three surfaces	Stands alone
Grand Slams	1877	95+ match wins at each Grand Slam	Stands alone
Grand Slams	1877	14 hardcourt Grand Slam titles	Stands alone
Grand Slams	1877	409 Grand Slam match wins	Stands alone
Grand Slams	1877	468 Grand Slam match played	Stands alone
Grand Slams	1877	84 men's Grand Slam singles tournament appearances	Stands alone
ATP rankings	1973	Most weeks at world No. 1 (428)	Stands alone
ATP rankings	1973	Most weeks ranked in top 2 (599)	Stands alone
ATP rankings	1973	Most weeks ranked in top 3 (764)	Stands alone
ATP rankings	1973	Most weeks ranked in top 4 (829)	Stands alone
ATP rankings	1973	Most weeks ranked in top 5 (873)	Stands alone
ATP rankings	1973	Most weeks ranked in top 6 (906)	Stands alone
ATP rankings	1973	Most weeks ranked in top 7 (946)	Stands alone
ATP rankings	1973	Most weeks ranked in top 8 (954)	Stands alone
ATP rankings	1973	13 different years ranked world No. 1	Stands alone
ATP rankings	1973	Most ranking points accumulated (16,950)	Stands alone
ATP rankings	1973	Eight-time Year-end world No. 1	Stands alone
ATP rankings	1973	Eight-time ITF World Champion	Stands alone
ATP Masters	1970	Career Golden Masters (Note: Won all active Masters tournaments of the tennis season in his career.)	Jannik Sinner
ATP Masters	1970	Double Career Golden Masters (Note: Won each active Masters tournament of the tennis season at least twice.)	Stands alone
ATP Masters	1970	40 Masters singles titles	Stands alone
ATP Masters	1970	6 Masters titles won in a season (2015)	Stands alone
ATP Masters	1970	12 consecutive Masters finals won	Stands alone
ATP Masters	1970	421 Masters match wins	Stands alone
ATP Masters	1970	521 Masters matches played	Stands alone
ATP Finals	1970	7 Year-end Championship titles	Stands alone
ATP Finals	1970	4 consecutive Year-end Championship titles	Stands alone
ATP Finals	1970	Winner of the Year-end Championship in three different decades	Stands alone

== Grand Slams records ==
- These records were attained in the Open Era of tennis.

Year(s)	Record accomplished	Players tied
Grand Slam tournaments
2008–23	24 Grand Slam singles titles	Stands alone
2008–23	Triple Career Grand Slam	Stands alone
2015–16	Champion of all four Major titles at once	Rod Laver
2015–16	Champion of all four Majors at once across all three different surfaces	Stands alone
2015–16	Champion of all four Majors and Year-end Championship simultaneously	Stands alone
2007–26	38 Grand Slam singles finals	Stands alone
2007–26	55 Grand Slam singles semifinals	Stands alone
2006–26	66 Grand Slam singles quarterfinals	Stands alone
2021	Surface Slam (major titles across all three surfaces in a season)	Rafael Nadal
Dominance
2015–16	Non-Calendar Year Grand Slam (Note: Reigning champion of all four Grand Slams at once (not in a calendar year).)	Stands alone
2007–21	Completed a full Career Grand Slam in both his 20s and 30s	Stands alone
2008–23	Won 12+ Major titles in both his 20s and 30s	Stands alone
2011–21	4 streaks of 3+ consecutive Major titles	Stands alone
2011–23	4 seasons winning 3 Major titles	Stands alone
2010–16	3+ consecutive finals at each of all four Majors	Stands alone
2011–23	4 winning streaks of 27+ Grand Slam matches	Stands alone
2011–23	5 winning streaks of 26+ Grand Slam matches	Stands alone
2015–16	30 consecutive Grand Slam match wins	Stands alone
2015, 21, 23	3 seasons winning 27 Grand Slam matches	Stands alone
2021	27 Grand Slam match-winning streak in a season	Stands alone
Versatility
2008–23	3+ titles at each of all four Majors	Stands alone
2007–26	7+ finals at each of all four Majors	Stands alone
2007–26	13+ semifinals at each of all four Majors	Stands alone
2007–26	14+ quarterfinals at each of all four Majors	Stands alone
2005–26	95+ match wins at each of all four Majors	Stands alone
2008–23	3+ Major titles across all three surfaces (hard, grass and clay)	Stands alone
2008–22	7+ titles at two majors with two distinct surfaces (hard & grass)	Stands alone
Consistency
2011–23	7 seasons winning multiple Major titles	Stands alone
2011–23	7 seasons reaching 3+ Major finals	Stands alone
2007–26	17 seasons reaching 1+ Major finals	Stands alone
2007–25	12 seasons reaching 3+ Major semifinals	Stands alone
2015, 21, 23	3 seasons winning 27 Major matches	Stands alone
2011–25	11 seasons winning 20+ Major matches	Stands alone
2015, 21, 23	3 seasons reaching all four Major finals	Roger Federer
2011–25	7 seasons reaching all four Major semifinals	Stands alone
2010–25	9 seasons reaching all four Major quarterfinals	Stands alone
At three majors
2007–26	10+ finals at three different Majors	Stands alone
2018–19	3 consecutive Major finals won in straight sets	Stands alone
2021	3 consecutive Major titles on 3 surfaces in a season	Rafael Nadal
2011, 21, 23	3 distinct Major title triples in a season (Note: 1. Australian–Wimbledon–US; 2. Australian–French–Wimbledon; 3. Australian–French–US)	Stands alone
2005–26	103+ singles match wins at three different Majors	Stands alone
At two majors
2008–23	7+ titles at multiple majors	Stands alone
2016, 21, 23	Australian Open–French Open title double in a season (thrice)	Stands alone
2021	Channel Slam (Wimbledon–French Open title double in a season)	Rod Laver; Björn Borg; Roger Federer; Rafael Nadal; Carlos Alcaraz
Other
2021	Won a Major title from 2 sets down in multiple matches	Stands alone
2011–23	Won 5 Major titles from 2 sets down in at least one match	Stands alone
2011, 19	Won two Major titles after saving match points	Rod Laver; Carlos Alcaraz
2018–23	Won 12 Major titles in his 30s	Stands alone
2008–23	Won Major titles in three different decades	Rafael Nadal
2005–26	Won 38 five-set matches at Majors	Stands alone
2005–26	Won 75 matches against top-10 at Majors	Stands alone
2005–26	Won 56 matches at Majors after dropping the first set	Stands alone
2006–26	Won 76 consecutive opening matches at Majors	Stands alone
2023	Won 15 consecutive tiebreaks at Majors	Stands alone
2011–23	Won a final in straight sets at all four Majors	Roger Federer
2021	Won a Grand Slam final from two sets down	Eight players (Note: Björn Borg, Ivan Lendl, Andre Agassi, Gastón Gaudio, Dominic Thiem, Rafael Nadal, Jannik Sinner, and Carlos Alcaraz.)
2012	Played the longest Grand Slam final by duration (5h:53m)	Rafael Nadal
2007–08	Youngest player to reach the semifinals of all four Majors (Note: 20 years, 8 months)	Stands alone
2007–08	Youngest player to reach all four Majors semifinals consecutively	Stands alone
2021	Most finals losses at a single grand slam tournament - Lost 6 US Open finals	Stands alone
2025	Oldest player to reach all four Majors semifinals in the same calendar year	Stands alone
Australian Open & US Open
2008–23	14 hardcourt Major titles	Stands alone
2007–26	21 hardcourt Major finals	Stands alone
2007–23	Most finals appearances at each hardcourt Major	Stands alone
2010–13	7 consecutive hardcourt Major finals	Stands alone
2005–26	Highest match winning percentage at hardcourt Majors – 88.1%	Stands alone
2011; 2015; 2023	Major hardcourt title double in a season	Mats Wilander; Roger Federer; Jannik Sinner

== ATP Masters records ==
- ATP Masters Series was introduced in 1990 as a successor to the "Grand Prix Super Series" which began in 1970.

Time span	Record accomplished	Players tied
2007–18	Career Golden Masters	Jannik Sinner
2007–20	Double Career Golden Masters	Stands alone
2007–23	40 Masters singles titles	Stands alone
2007–25	60 Masters singles finals	Stands alone
Dominance
2015	6 Masters titles won in a season	Stands alone
2015	8 Masters finals reached in a season (Note: Did not participate in the 9th Masters, Madrid Open.)	Stands alone
2012–15	12 Masters finals won in a row	Stands alone
2011, 14–15	Streak of 5 Masters titles (twice)	Stands alone
2014–16	Streak of 11 Masters finals	Stands alone
2015	39 Masters match wins in a season	Stands alone
2011, 14–15	2 streaks of 30+ consecutive Masters match wins	Stands alone
2007–22	11 Masters titles won without dropping a set	Stands alone
2007–22	6 different Masters tournaments won without dropping a set	Stands alone
2007–23	All 9 Masters tournaments won without dropping more than 1 set	Stands alone
2007–22	6 Masters titles at one tournament on hard, clay, and indoors (Note: Miami Open, Italian Open, and Paris Masters.)	Stands alone
2007–21	Record holder of most titles won at 4 different Masters tournaments (Note: Indian Wells Masters, Miami Open, Shanghai Masters and Paris Masters.)	Rafael Nadal (Note: Monte Carlo Masters, Madrid Masters, Rome Masters and Canada Masters.)
2018	Winner of a Masters title without losing serve	Roger Federer; Alexander Zverev
Consistency
2011, 15	2 years winning 5+ Masters titles	Stands alone
2011, 14–16	4 years winning 4+ Masters titles	Stands alone
2011–12, 15	3 years reaching 6+ Masters finals	Stands alone
2011–12	2 consecutive years reaching 6+ Masters finals	Stands alone
2014–16	3 consecutive years winning 4+ Masters titles	Stands alone
2011–16	6 consecutive years winning 3+ Masters titles	Stands alone
2011–15	2 consecutive titles at 6 different Masters tournaments	Stands alone
2015	4 consecutive Masters title defences	Stands alone
Versatility
2007–20	2+ titles at all 9 different Masters tournaments	Stands alone
2007–23	3+ titles at 8 different Masters tournaments	Stands alone
2007–18	4+ titles at 6 different Masters tournaments	Stands alone
2007-23	5+ titles at 4 different Masters tournaments (Note: 5 Indian Wells Masters, 6 Miami Open, 6 Rome Masters and 7 Paris Masters.)	Rafael Nadal (Note: 11 Monte Carlo Masters, 5 Madrid Masters, 10 Rome Masters and 5 Canada Masters.)
2007–19	3+ finals across all 9 different Masters tournaments	Stands alone
2005–22	30+ match wins at each of all 9 Masters tournaments	Stands alone
Title doubles and triples
2011, 16	Indian Wells–Miami–Canada Masters title triple (Note: Consecutive Masters on hardcourts.) (x2)	Stands alone
2013–15	Hard–Clay–Indoors Masters title triple (Note: Won a Masters title(s) on hardcourts, clay courts and indoor courts in a season.) (x3)	Stands alone
2011–16	Winner of all 3 clay Masters tournaments (Note: Monte-Carlo Masters, Madrid Open and Rome Masters.) (x2)	Rafael Nadal
2011, 14–16	Indian Wells–Miami Masters title double (x4)	Stands alone
2011	Madrid–Rome Masters title double (Note: Consecutive Masters on claycourts.)	Rafael Nadal; Jannik Sinner
2007–16	Miami–Canada Masters title double (x4)	Stands alone
2003, 15	Shanghai–Paris Masters title double (x2)	Stands alone

== Year-end Championship records ==
- ATP Finals was introduced in 1990 as a successor to the "Grand Prix Masters" championship which began in 1970.

Time span	Record accomplished	Players tied
2008–23	7 Year-end Championships titles	Stands alone
2012–15	4 consecutive Year-end Championship titles	Stands alone
2008–23	Winner of the Year-end Championships in three different decades	Stands alone
2008–23	Longest timespan between first and last titles (15 years) (Note: Second longest timespan was 8 years by Federer and Sampras.)	Stands alone
2012–15	15 consecutive Year-end Championship match wins	Stands alone
2012–14	Went undefeated in three consecutive Year-end Championships	Stands alone
2014	76% game winning percentage in a single Year-end Championship	Stands alone
2023	Oldest Year-end Championships champion – 36 years, 5 months	Stands alone
2011	Fastest to qualify for the Year-end Championship – 18 weeks, 6 days	Stands alone
2013, 15	Autumn sweep (Note: Winning Shanghai Masters, Paris Masters and the Year-end Championship consecutively.) – twice	Stands alone
2013–15, 23	Paris Masters and Year-end Championship back-to-back titles (x4)	Stands alone

- Djokovic is the first and only player to win his first 5 finals at the Year-end championships.

== Head-to-head records ==
Time span	Record accomplished	Players tied
2006–24	Part of the top-2 rivalries in the Open Era (vs. Nadal & Federer)	Stands alone
2006–24	25+ wins over each other member of the Big Four (Federer, Nadal & Murray)	Stands alone
2006–24	Winning head-to-head record against each other member of the Big Four	Stands alone
2006–23	21+ wins over five opponents (Nadal, Federer, Murray, Wawrinka & Berdych)	Stands alone
2005–26	Most match wins vs. Top-10 players (269)	Stands alone
2007–26	Most match wins vs. Top-5 players (130)	Stands alone
2007–24	Most match wins against one opponent (31 vs. Rafael Nadal)	Stands alone
2008–17	Most dominant record against one opponent (22-match win lead vs. Tomas Berdych)	Stands alone
2005–25	Most dominant unbeaten record against one opponent (20–0 vs. Gael Monfils)	Stands alone
2009–21	Most dominant sets record against one opponent (33–0 vs. Jérémy Chardy)	Stands alone
2011	Most dominant record against world No. 1 in a season (5–0 vs. Rafael Nadal)	Stands alone
2008–20	Most Grand Slam match wins against one opponent (11 vs. Roger Federer)	Rafael Nadal
2015	31 match wins vs. Top-10 opponents in a season	Stands alone
2015	37.8% percentage of Top-10 wins to the overall match wins of a season	Stands alone
2015	Defeated all Top-10 players in a season	Stands alone
2015	Defeated all year-end Top-19 players in a season	Stands alone
2011–16	5 seasons winning 20+ matches vs. Top-10 opponents	Stands alone
2011	5 consecutive match wins against world No. 1 player in finals (Rafael Nadal) (Note: Djokovic proceeded to defeat Nadal at the 2011 US Open and 2012 Australian Open, where their rankings were by then reversed.)	Stands alone
2008–26	9 match victories over defending Grand Slam champions	Stands alone
2007	Youngest player to beat the top-3 in succession (Roddick, Nadal & Federer) (Note: 20 years, 2 months)	Stands alone

== Ranking records ==
Time span	Record accomplished	Players tied
2011–24	Most weeks at world No. 1 (428)	Stands alone
2010–24	Most weeks ranked in top 2 (599)	Stands alone
2007–26	Most weeks ranked in top 3 (764)	Stands alone
2007–26	Most weeks ranked in top 4 (829)	Stands alone
2007–26	Most weeks ranked in top 5 (873)	Stands alone
2007–26	Most weeks ranked in top 6 (906)	Stands alone
2007–26	Most weeks ranked in top 7 (946)	Stands alone
2007–26	Most weeks ranked in top 8 (954)	Stands alone
2011–24	13 different years ranked world No. 1	Stands alone
2016	Most ranking points accumulated at No. 1 (16,950)	Stands alone
2011–23	Eight-time Year-end world No. 1	Stands alone
2011–23	Eight-time ITF World Champion	Stands alone
2011–23	9 seasons with 11,000+ points accumulated as No. 1	Stands alone
2011–15	5 consecutive seasons with 11,000+ points accumulated as No. 1	Stands alone
2011–23	Longest timespan between first and last Year-end No. 1 finishes (13 years)	Stands alone
2018	Clinched Year-end No. 1 after ranked outside the top 20 in the same season	Carlos Alcaraz
2018	Clinched Year-end No. 1 after ending the previous season outside the top 10	Carlos Alcaraz
2023	Biggest jump to world No. 1 (5 → 1)	Stands alone
2011–22	4 streaks of 50+ weeks at No. 1	Stands alone
2011–24	Most wins as world No. 1 (485)	Stands alone
2007–10	4 consecutive years ended at No. 3	Stands alone

== Overall records ==
Time span	Elite tournaments records	Players tied
2007–21	Big Title Sweep (annual) – twice	Stands alone
2007–24	72 Big Titles won	Stands alone
2008–24	Career Super Slam (winning all four Majors, the Year-end Championship and the Olympic gold medal)	Andre Agassi
2007–23	50 Big Titles on hardcourts	Stands alone
2015	10 Big Titles in a season	Stands alone
2007–23	Multiple champion at all 14 annual elite tournaments	Stands alone
2008–22	6+ Big Titles at one tournament on hard, clay, grass and indoors	Stands alone
2011–21	Three-peat at 6 different elite tournaments	Stands alone
2014–15–16	7 Big Titles in a row (twice)	Stands alone
2015	Champion or finalist in all elite tournaments a player played in a season	Stands alone
2008–23	11 years winning 4+ Big Titles	Stands alone
2007–26	20 consecutive years reaching 1+ Big final	Stands alone
2011–16	6 consecutive years winning 5+ Big Titles	Stands alone
2007–26	108 Big finals appearances	Stands alone
2014–16	18 Big finals in a row	Stands alone
2007–19	3+ finals across all elite tournaments	Stands alone
2007–24	5+ finals in 12 different elite tournaments	Stands alone
2014–15	43 match winning streak in elite tournaments	Stands alone
2004–24	80%+ win rate across all three surfaces in elite tournaments	Stands alone
All tournaments records
2007–23	62 titles won by defeating multiple Top-10 players	Stands alone
2007–23	25 titles won by defeating multiple Top-5 players	Stands alone
2006–26	73 titles on hardcourts	Stands alone
2005–26	Won 42 five-set matches	Ilie Nastase
2009–21	Three-peat at 8 different tournaments	Stands alone
2007–23	12 seasons winning 5+ titles	Stands alone
2010–23	10 winning streaks of 20+ matches	Stands alone
2015	15 straight finals in a season	Stands alone
2007–23	9 titles won after saving 1+ match points during the tournament	Stands alone
2007–23	17 consecutive quarterfinals played in one tournament (Italian Open)	Stands alone
2009–26	Longest unbeaten start (34–0) by any player at a single tournament (China Open)	Stands alone
2004–24	80%+ win rate across all three surfaces (hard, grass and clay)	Stands alone
2018	All-time prize money leader ($195,569,265)	Stands alone
2015	Most prize money won in a season ($21,646,145)	Stands alone
2011–23	9 seasons winning $10,000,000+	Stands alone
2023	Longest best-of-three final by duration (3h:49m)	Carlos Alcaraz
2009	Longest best-of-three match with a deciding-set tiebreak by duration (4h:3m)	Rafael Nadal
2004–26	83.1% (1182–241) – Highest career match winning percentage	Stands alone
2004–26	84.1% (746–141) – Highest hardcourt match winning percentage	Stands alone
2004–26	95.7% (1022–46) – Highest match winning percentage after winning first set (Note: Minimum 100 wins.)	Stands alone
2004–26	45.1% (160–195) – Highest match winning percentage after losing first set (Note: Minimum 100 wins.)	Stands alone

== Per tournament records ==
- This section lists Djokovic's significant records at single tournaments.

=== At each Grand Slam tournament ===
Grand Slam	Year(s)	Record accomplished	Players tied
Australian Open	2008–23	10 singles titles	Stands alone
Australian Open	2008–26	11 singles finals	Stands alone
Australian Open	2008–26	16 singles quarterfinals	Stands alone
Australian Open	2011–13; 2019–21	2 streaks of 3 consecutive titles	Stands alone
Australian Open	2008–23	4+ titles in his 20s and 30s	Stands alone
Australian Open	2019–24	Longest match win streak (33)	Stands alone
Australian Open	2012	Longest final by duration (5h:53m)	Rafael Nadal
Australian Open	2005–26	21 singles tournaments played	Roger Federer
Australian Open	2005–26	104 singles match wins	Stands alone
French Open	2011–16	6 consecutive semifinals	Rafael Nadal
French Open	2010–25	16 consecutive quarterfinals	Stands alone
French Open	2006–25	19 quarterfinals overall	Stands alone
French Open	2023	Oldest singles champion – 36 years	Stands alone
French Open	2005–26	22 singles tournaments played	Richard Gasquet
French Open	2005–26	22 singles consecutive tournaments played	Stands alone
French Open	2005–26	Most matches played (121)	Stands alone
Wimbledon	2011–22	3+ titles in his 20s and 30s	Stands alone
Wimbledon	2007–26	15 semifinals	Stands alone
Wimbledon	2005–26	107 men's singles match wins	Stands alone
Wimbledon	2005–26	Most matches played (121)	Stands alone
Wimbledon	2014–23	Longest Centre Court match win streak (45)	Stands alone
Wimbledon	2019	Longest final by duration (4h:57m)	Roger Federer
Wimbledon	2026	Longest quarterfinals by duration (5h:15m)	Félix Auger-Aliassime
Wimbledon	2019	Longest rally played at Wimbledon (45-shot rally)	R. Bautista Agut
US Open	2007–23	10 singles finals	Bill Tilden
US Open	2023	Oldest singles champion – 36 years	Stands alone
US Open	2012	Longest final by duration (4h:54m)	Andy Murray; Mats Wilander; Ivan Lendl
US Open	2012	Longest tiebreak in a final (by points – 22) vs. Andy Murray	Andy Murray

- Djokovic holds a 10–1 finals record at Australian Open.

=== At Masters tournaments ===
Tournament	Year(s)	Record accomplished	Players tied
Paris Masters	2009–21	7 singles titles	Stands alone
Paris Masters	2013–15	3 consecutive titles	Stands alone
Paris Masters	2023	Oldest singles champion – 36 years	Stands alone
Miami Masters	2007–16	6 singles titles	Andre Agassi
Miami Masters	2014–16	3 consecutive titles	Andre Agassi
Miami Masters	2007–25	8 singles finals	Andre Agassi
Indian Wells Masters	2008–16	5 singles titles	Roger Federer
Indian Wells Masters	2014–16	3 consecutive titles	Roger Federer
Shanghai Masters	2012–18	4 singles titles	Stands alone
Shanghai Masters	2012–13	2 consecutive titles	Andy Murray
Rome Masters	2008–22	12 singles finals	Rafael Nadal
Rome Masters	2022	Oldest singles champion – 34 years	Stands alone
Cincinnati Masters	2023	Winner of longest Cincinnati final (3h:49m vs. Alcaraz)	Stands alone
Cincinnati Masters	2023	Oldest singles champion – 36 years	Stands alone

=== At the Year-end Championship ===
Tournament	Year(s)	Record accomplished (selected)	Players tied
ATP Finals	2008–23	7 singles titles	Stands alone
ATP Finals	2012–15	4 consecutive singles titles	Stands alone

=== At the Summer Olympics ===
Tournament	Year(s)	Record accomplished (selected)	Players tied
Summer Olympics	2024	Winning an Olympic gold medal in men's singles without dropping a set	Stands alone
Summer Olympics	2024	Oldest Olympic gold medalist in men's singles (37 years)	Stands alone

=== At other tournaments ===
Tournament	Year(s)	Record accomplished	Players tied
China Open	2009–26	7 singles titles	Stands alone
Serbia Open	2009–11	2 singles titles (Note: Djokovic won a third title in Belgrade in 2021.)	Stands alone

== Guinness World Records ==
This is a list of official Guinness World Records that belong to Djokovic.

1. Most Grand Slam singles tennis titles won (male)
2. Most Grand Slam singles tennis finals contested (male)
3. First tennis player to achieve a “Triple Career Grand Slam” (male)
4. First tennis player to achieve an open-era “Double Career Grand Slam” (male)
5. Most consecutive men's Grand Slam Singles tennis titles (open era)
6. Most consecutive Grand Slam singles matches won (male, open era)
7. Most Australian Open tennis singles titles won (male)
8. Most Australian Open singles titles won (open era)
9. First tennis player to win three successive Australian Open titles
10. Most weeks ranked number one in singles tennis (male)
11. First player to achieve a “Career Golden Masters”
12. Most ATP Masters 1000 singles titles won in a career
13. Most ATP Masters 1000 singles titles won in a season
14. Most ATP Masters 1000 singles finals in a season
15. Most consecutive Masters 1000 matches won
16. Most wins of the ATP Finals (singles)
17. Oldest winner at the ATP Finals (singles)
18. First male tennis player to win a Grand Slam singles title in three different decades (open era)
19. First player to win a Wimbledon men's singles final after saving match points (open era)
20. First Grand Slam men's singles final to feature a final-set tie-break
21. Most ATP Tour singles matches between two players (open era)
22. Most tennis Grand Slam meetings (singles)
23. Most consecutive Grand Slam singles final losses by a man [Nadal to Djokovic]
24. Most ATP Player of the Year awards won
25. Longest Grand Slam tennis final
26. Longest Wimbledon singles final
27. Highest earnings in a tennis season
28. Highest earnings in a tennis career (male)
29. Highest earnings in a tennis season (male)
30. Most prize money won by a tennis player at a single tournament

== Awards and honours ==
=== Professional awards ===
- ITF World Champion (8): 2011, 2012, 2013, 2014, 2015, 2018, 2021, 2023
- ATP Player of the Year (8): 2011, 2012, 2014, 2015, 2018, 2020, 2021, 2023
- ATP Most Improved Player of the Year (2): 2006, 2007
- ATP Comeback Player of the Year: 2018
- Arthur Ashe Humanitarian of the Year: 2012
- Davis Cup Commitment Award

=== Media awards ===
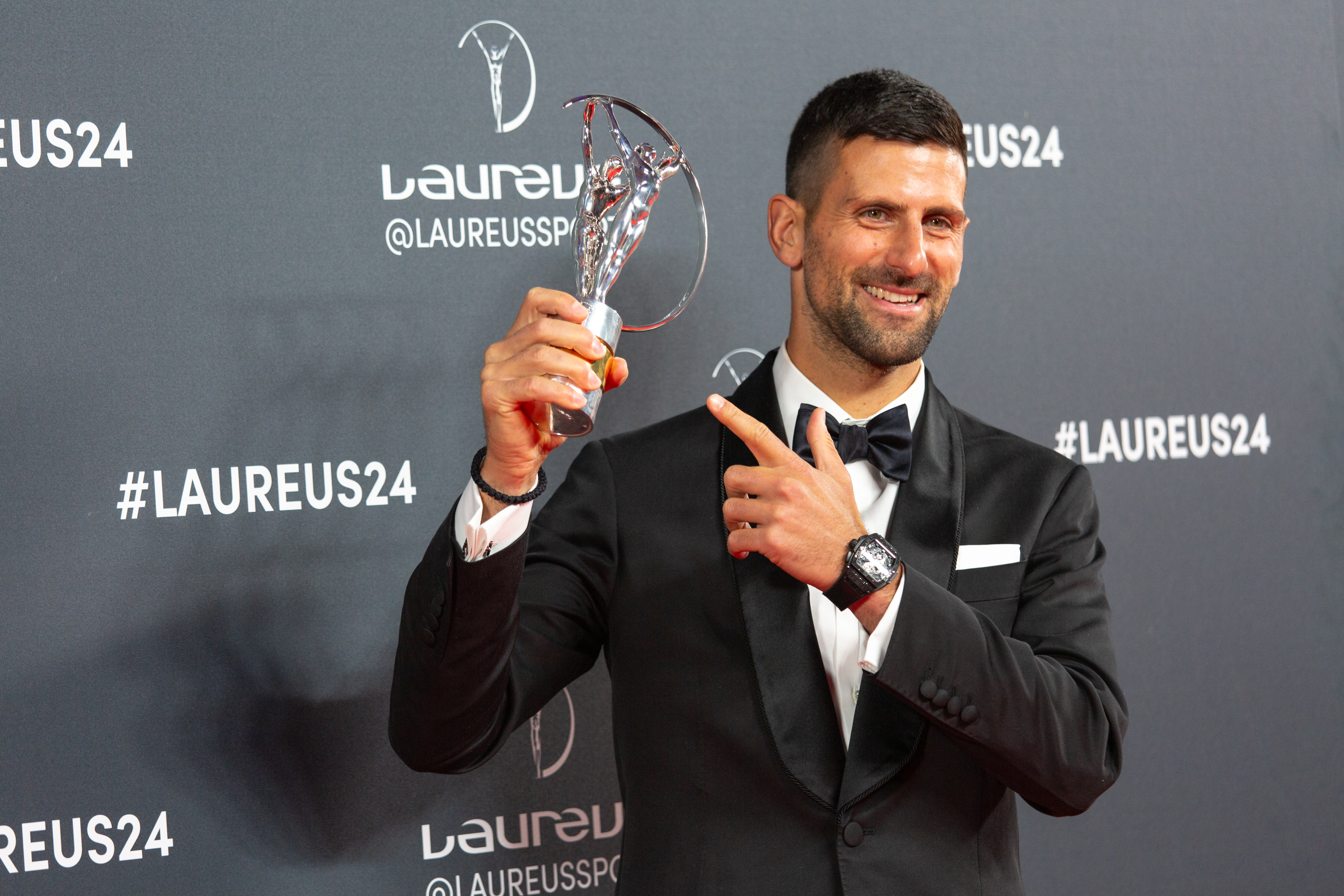
Djokovic holding the Laureus World Sports Award trophy in 2024.

- Tennis Player of the Decade: 2010s
- Laureus World Sports Award for Sportsman of the Year (5): 2012, 2015, 2016, 2019, 2024
- Olympic Committee of Serbia Sportsman of the Year (10): 2007, 2010, 2011, 2013–2015, 2018–2020, 2023
- BTA Best Balkan Athlete of the Year (8): 2011, 2012, 2013, 2014, 2015, 2019, 2021, 2023
- Best Male Tennis Player ESPY Award (6): 2012, 2013, 2015, 2016, 2021, 2023
- PAP European Sportsperson of the Year (5): 2011, 2015, 2018, 2021, 2023
- Sport Golden Badge (4): 2007, 2010, 2011, 2015
- AIPS Athlete of the Year (2): 2011, 2023
- AIPS Europe Athletes of the Year – Frank Taylor Trophy (4): 2011, 2012, 2015, 2023
- Eurosport International Athlete of the Year (3): 2011, 2015, 2021
- US Sports Academy Male Athlete of the Year (2): 2011, 2014
- Marca International Athlete of the Year (2): 2011, 2023
- L'Équipe World Champion of Champions (2): 2021, 2023
- BBC Overseas Sports Personality of the Year: 2011
- EFE Champion of Champions Award: 2015
- GQ ACE of the Year: 2011
- Marca Legend – 2016

=== Orders ===
- Order of St. Sava, First Class by Irinej, Serbian Patriarch (2011)
- Order of Karađorđe's Star, First Class by Boris Tadić, President of Serbia (2012)
- Order of the Republika Srpska on Sash by Milorad Dodik, President of Republika Srpska (2013)

=== Special awards ===
- Vermeil Medal for Physical Education and Sports by Albert II, Prince of Monaco (2012)
- Centrepoint Great Britain Youth Inspiration Award by Prince William, Duke of Cambridge (2012)
- Key to the City / Honorary Citizen of Zvečan (2011), Banja Luka (2013), Andrićgrad (2015), Nikšić (2021), Budva (2022), Visoko (2022), Vrnjačka Banja (2022) and Herceg Novi (2023)
- Honorary Mayor of Rural City of Swan Hill (2016)
- Golden Knight – Sword of Holy Serbian Despot Stefan Lazarević by Prince Michael Karađorđević, Royal Order of Knights (2016)
- Order of Nikola Tesla by Tesla Science Foundation of Philadelphia (2022)

== See also ==
- List of career achievements by Roger Federer
- List of career achievements by Rafael Nadal
- List of career achievements by Andy Murray

== Notes ==
Sporting positions
Preceded by Rafael Nadal; Roger Federer; Rafael Nadal; Rafael Nadal; Rafael Nadal; Daniil Medvedev; Carlos Alcaraz; Carlos Alcaraz; Carlos Alcaraz; Carlos Alcaraz	World No. 1 July 4, 2011 – July 8, 2012; November 5, 2012 – October 6, 2013; July 7, 2014 – November 6, 2016; November 5, 2018 – November 5, 2019; February 3, 2020 – Feb 28, 2022; Mar 21, 2022 – Jun 12, 2022; Jan 30, 2023 – Mar 19, 2023; Apr 3, 2023 – May 21, 2023; Jun 12, 2023 – Jun 25, 2023; Sep 11, 2023 – Jun 10, 2024	Succeeded by Roger Federer; Rafael Nadal; Andy Murray; Rafael Nadal; Daniil Medvedev; Daniil Medvedev; Carlos Alcaraz; Carlos Alcaraz; Carlos Alcaraz; Jannik Sinner
Preceded by Mardy Fish	US Open Series Champion; 2012	Succeeded by Rafael Nadal
Awards
Preceded by Rafael Nadal	ATP Most Improved Player; 2006, 2007	Succeeded by Jo-Wilfried Tsonga
Preceded by Olivera Jevtić; Nađa Higl; Davor Štefanek	The Best Athlete of Serbia; 2007; 2010, 2011; 2015	Succeeded by Milorad Čavić; Milica Mandić —
Preceded by Rafael Nadal; Rafael Nadal; Rafael Nadal; Rafael Nadal	ATP Player of the Year; 2011, 2012; 2014, 2015; 2018; 2020, 2021	Succeeded by Rafael Nadal; Andy Murray; Rafael Nadal; Carlos Alcaraz
Preceded by Rafael Nadal; Rafael Nadal —	ITF World Champion; 2011 – 2015; 2018; 2021	Succeeded by Andy Murray; Rafael Nadal; Rafael Nadal
Preceded by Rafael Nadal	BBC Sports Personality World Sport Star of the Year; 2011	Succeeded by Usain Bolt
Preceded by Sebastian Vettel; Lewis Hamilton; Cristiano Ronaldo; Robert Lewandowski	European Sportsperson of the Year; 2011; 2015; 2018; 2021	Succeeded by Sebastian Vettel; Cristiano Ronaldo; Lewis Hamilton; Incumbent
Preceded by Rafael Nadal; Sebastian Vettel; Roger Federer	Laureus World Sportsman of the Year; 2012; 2015, 2016; 2019	Succeeded by Usain Bolt; Usain Bolt; Lionel Messi & Lewis Hamilton
Preceded by Rafael Nadal; Rafael Nadal —	Best Male Tennis Player ESPY Award; 2012, 2013; 2015, 2016; 2021	Succeeded by Rafael Nadal; Roger Federer; Rafael Nadal
Preceded by Rafael Nadal	Arthur Ashe Humanitarian of the Year; 2012	Succeeded by Roger Federer
Preceded by Xavi	Marca Leyenda; 2016	Succeeded by Luis Suárez Miramontes
Preceded by Roger Federer	ATP Comeback Player of the Year; 2018	Succeeded by Andy Murray
Records
Preceded by Roger Federer; Roger Federer	ATP Prize Money Leader; April 4, 2016 – October 30, 2017; September 10, 2018 –	Succeeded by Roger Federer; Incumbent
Preceded by Roger Federer	Most Weeks at World No. 1 March 8, 2021 –	Succeeded by Incumbent
Olympic Games
Preceded by Jasna Šekarić	Flagbearer for Serbia; London 2012	Succeeded by Ivana; Anđušić Maksimović
