= ATP Masters 1000 singles records and statistics =

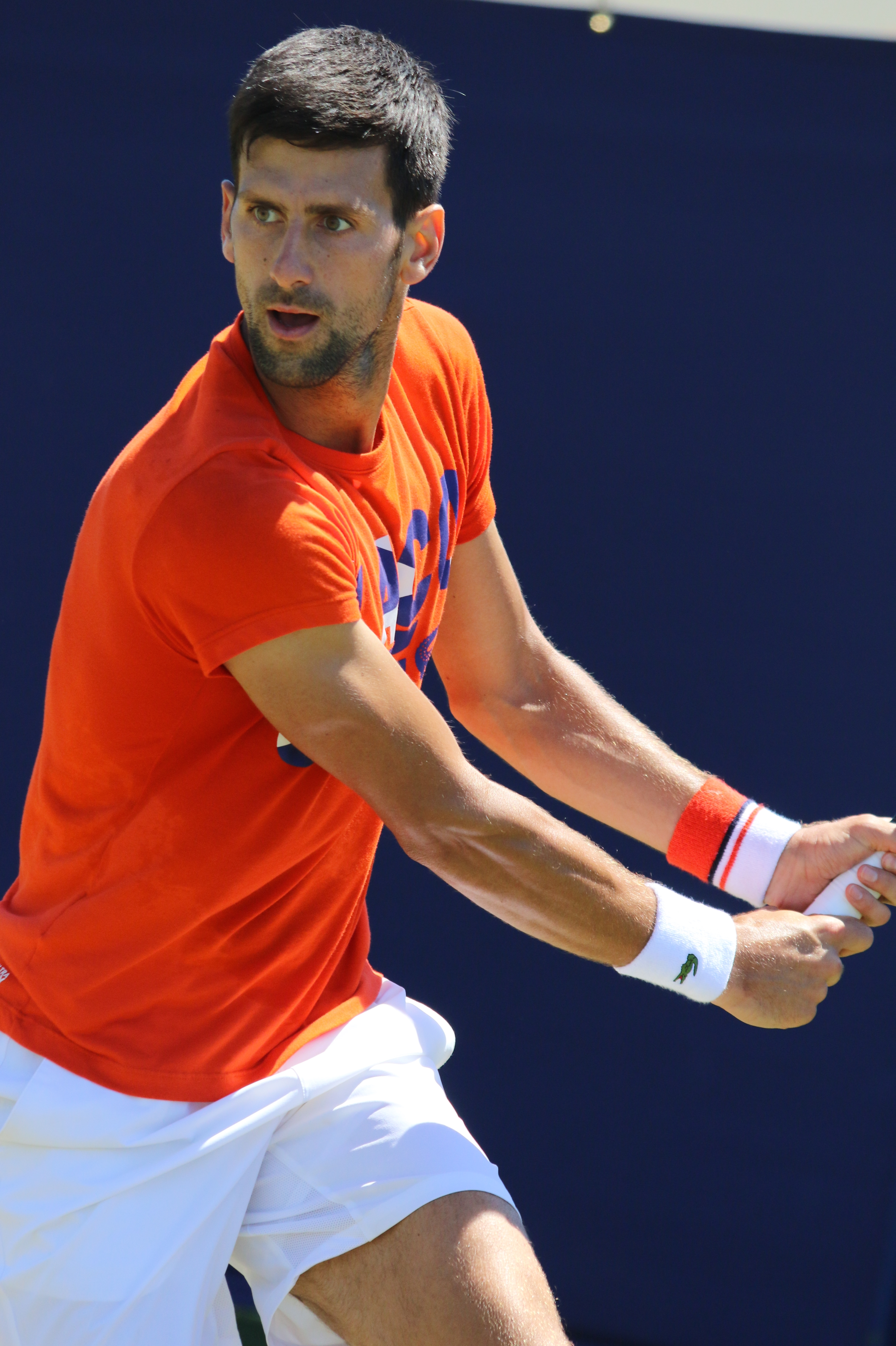
Novak Djokovic has won a record 40 ATP Masters 1000 titles.

In tennis, the ATP Masters 1000 is an annual series of nine top-level tennis tournaments featuring the elite men's tennis players on the ATP Tour. The tournaments are important for the top players on the professional circuit as the series constituted the most prestigious tournaments in men's tennis after the four Grand Slam events. The Masters series along with the Grand Slam tournaments, the ATP Finals championship and the Olympic Games are considered the top-tier events of men's tennis, referred to by the ATP as the "Big Titles".

== Tournaments types ==
Twelve tournaments have been held as ATP Masters 1000 events, with nine being played each year. They have been played on three different surfaces:

Hard court:

- Indian Wells Open (1999-present)
- Miami Open (1990–present)
- Canadian Open (1990–present)
- Cincinnati Open (1990-present)
- Shanghai Masters (2009–present)
- Paris Masters (2007-present) indoors
- Stuttgart Masters (1998–2001) indoors
- Madrid Open (2002–08) indoors

Clay court:

- Madrid Open (2009-present)
- Italian Open (1990-present)
- Monte-Carlo Masters (1990-present)
- Hamburg Masters (1990–2008)

Carpet court:

- Stockholm Open (1990–94) indoors
- Stuttgart Masters (1995–97) indoors
- Paris Masters (1990–2006) indoors

== Champions by year ==
Active tournaments	Discontinued tournaments

- First-time champion is indicated in **bold**.

Year (Note: Seasons' tournaments are in chronological order with three exceptions: 1. Cincinnati was held before Canada in 1996.; 2. Rome was held before Madrid/Hamburg from 2000 to 2010 and after Cincinnati in 2020.; 3. Indian Wells was held after Cincinnati in 2021.)	Indian Wells Open	Miami Open	Monte-Carlo Masters	Hamburg Open	Italian Open	Canadian Open	Cincinnati Open	Stockholm Open	Paris Masters
1990	**Edberg** (1/4)	**Agassi** (1/17)	**Chesnokov** (1/2)	**Aguilera** (1/1)	**Muster** (1/8)	**Chang** (1/7)	Edberg (2/4)	**Becker** (1/5)	Edberg (3/4)
1991	**Courier** (1/5)	Courier (2/5)	**Bruguera** (1/2)	**Nováček** (1/1)	**Sánchez** (1/1)	Chesnokov (2/2)	**Forget** (1/2)	Becker (2/5)	Forget (2/2)
1992	Chang (2/7)	Chang (3/7)	Muster (2/8)	Edberg (4/4)	Courier (3/5)	Agassi (2/17)	**Sampras** (1/11)	**Ivanišević** (1/2)	Becker (3/5)
1993	Courier (4/5)	Sampras (2/11)	Bruguera (2/2)	**Stich** (1/2)	Courier (5/5)	**Pernfors** (1/1)	Chang (4/7)	Stich (2/2)	Ivanišević (2/2)
1994	Sampras (3/11)	Sampras (4/11)	**A. Medvedev** (1/4)	A. Medvedev (2/4)	Sampras (5/11)	Agassi (3/17)	Chang (5/7)	Becker (4/5)	Agassi (4/17)
								↓ **Stuttgart Masters** ↓	
1995	Sampras (6/11)	Agassi (5/17)	Muster (3/8)	A. Medvedev (3/4)	Muster (4/8)	Agassi (6/17)	Agassi (7/17)	Muster (5/8) (Note: First event of Stuttgart Masters was held in Essen.)	Sampras (7/11)
1996	Chang (6/7)	Agassi (8/17)	Muster (6/8)	**Carretero** (1/1)	Muster (7/8)	**Ferreira** (1/2)	Agassi (9/17)	Becker (5/5)	**Enqvist** (1/3)
1997	Chang (7/7)	Muster (8/8)	**Ríos** (1/5)	A. Medvedev (4/4)	**Corretja** (1/2)	**Woodruff** (1/1)	Sampras (8/11)	**Korda** (1/1)	Sampras (9/11)
1998	Ríos (2/5)	Ríos (3/5)	**Moyá** (1/3)	**Costa** (1/1)	Ríos (4/5)	**Rafter** (1/2)	Rafter (2/2)	**Krajicek** (1/2)	**Rusedski** (1/1)
1999	**Philippoussis** (1/1)	Krajicek (2/2)	**Kuerten** (1/5)	Ríos (5/5)	Kuerten (2/5)	**Johansson** (1/1)	Sampras (10/11)	Enqvist (2/3)	Agassi (10/17)
2000	Corretja (2/2)	Sampras (11/11)	**Pioline** (1/1)	Kuerten (3/5)	**Norman** (1/1)	**Safin** (1/5)	Enqvist (3/3)	Ferreira (2/2)	Safin (2/5)
2001	Agassi (11/17)	Agassi (12/17)	Kuerten (4/5)	**Portas** (1/1)	**Ferrero** (1/4)	**Pavel** (1/1)	Kuerten (5/5)	**Haas** (1/1)	**Grosjean** (1/1)
								↓ **Madrid Open** ↓	
2002	**Hewitt** (1/2)	Agassi (13/17)	Ferrero (2/4)	**Federer** (1/28)	Agassi (14/17)	**Cañas** (1/1)	Moyá (2/3)	Agassi (15/17)	Safin (3/5)
2003	Hewitt (2/2)	Agassi (16/17)	Ferrero (3/4)	**Coria** (1/2)	**Mantilla** (1/1)	**Roddick** (1/5)	Roddick (2/5)	Ferrero (4/4)	**Henman** (1/1)
2004	Federer (2/28)	Roddick (3/5)	Coria (2/2)	Federer (3/28)	Moyá (3/3)	Federer (4/28)	Agassi (17/17)	Safin (4/5)	Safin (5/5)
2005	Federer (5/28)	Federer (6/28)	**Nadal** (1/36)	Federer (7/28)	Nadal (2/36)	Nadal (3/36)	Federer (8/28)	Nadal (4/36)	**Berdych** (1/1)
2006	Federer (9/28)	Federer (10/28)	Nadal (5/36)	**Robredo** (1/1)	Nadal (6/36)	Federer (11/28)	Roddick (4/5)	Federer (12/28)	**Davydenko** (1/3)
2007	Nadal (7/36)	**Djokovic** (1/40)	Nadal (8/36)	Federer (13/28)	Nadal (9/36)	Djokovic (2/40)	Federer (14/28)	**Nalbandian** (1/2)	Nalbandian (2/2)
2008	Djokovic (3/40)	Davydenko (2/3)	Nadal (10/36)	Nadal (11/36)	Djokovic (4/40)	Nadal (12/36)	**Murray** (1/14)	Murray (2/14)	**Tsonga** (1/2)
				↓ **Madrid Open** (Note: Madrid replaced Hamburg in 2009, switching from indoor hard courts to clay.) ↓				↓ **Shanghai Masters** ↓	
2009	Nadal (13/36)	Murray (3/14)	Nadal (14/36)	Federer (15/28)	Nadal (15/36)	Murray (4/14)	Federer (16/28)	Davydenko (3/3)	Djokovic (5/40)
2010	**Ljubičić** (1/1)	Roddick (5/5)	Nadal (16/36)	Nadal (18/36)	Nadal (17/36)	Murray (5/14)	Federer (17/28)	Murray (6/14)	**Söderling** (1/1)
2011	Djokovic (6/40)	Djokovic (7/40)	Nadal (19/36)	Djokovic (8/40)	Djokovic (9/40)	Djokovic (10/40)	Murray (7/14)	Murray (8/14)	Federer (18/28)
2012	Federer (19/28)	Djokovic (11/40)	Nadal (20/36)	Federer (20/28)	Nadal (21/36)	Djokovic (12/40)	Federer (21/28)	Djokovic (13/40)	**Ferrer** (1/1)
2013	Nadal (22/36)	Murray (9/14)	Djokovic (14/40)	Nadal (23/36)	Nadal (24/36)	Nadal (25/36)	Nadal (26/36)	Djokovic (15/40)	Djokovic (16/40)
2014	Djokovic (17/40)	Djokovic (18/40)	**Wawrinka** (1/1)	Nadal (27/36)	Djokovic (19/40)	Tsonga (2/2)	Federer (22/28)	Federer (23/28)	Djokovic (20/40)
2015	Djokovic (21/40)	Djokovic (22/40)	Djokovic (23/40)	Murray (10/14)	Djokovic (24/40)	Murray (11/14)	Federer (24/28)	Djokovic (25/40)	Djokovic (26/40)
2016	Djokovic (27/40)	Djokovic (28/40)	Nadal (28/36)	Djokovic (29/40)	Murray (12/14)	Djokovic (30/40)	**Čilić** (1/1)	Murray (13/14)	Murray (14/14)
2017	Federer (25/28)	Federer (26/28)	Nadal (29/36)	Nadal (30/36)	**Zverev** (1/7)	Zverev (2/7)	**Dimitrov** (1/1)	Federer (27/28)	**Sock** (1/1)
2018	**del Potro** (1/1)	**Isner** (1/1)	Nadal (31/36)	Zverev (3/7)	Nadal (32/36)	Nadal (33/36)	Djokovic (31/40)	Djokovic (32/40)	**Khachanov** (1/1)
2019	**Thiem** (1/1)	Federer (28/28)	**Fognini** (1/1)	Djokovic (33/40)	Nadal (34/36)	Nadal (35/36)	**D. Medvedev** (1/6)	D. Medvedev (2/6)	Djokovic (34/40)
2020	not held (Note: not held due to the COVID-19 pandemic.)				Djokovic (36/40)	not held	Djokovic (35/40) (Note: In 2020, Cincinnati was held in New York City.)	not held	D. Medvedev (3/6)
2021	**Norrie** (1/1)	**Hurkacz** (1/2)	**Tsitsipas** (1/3)	Zverev (4/7)	Nadal (36/36)	D. Medvedev (4/6)	Zverev (5/7)	not held	Djokovic (37/40)
2022	**Fritz** (1/1)	**Alcaraz** (1/9)	Tsitsipas (2/3)	Alcaraz (2/9)	Djokovic (38/40)	**Carreño Busta** (1/1)	**Ćorić** (1/1)	not held	**Rune** (1/1)
2023	Alcaraz (3/9)	(Note: Competed under no flag due to the Russian invasion of Ukraine.) D. Medvedev (5/6)	**Rublev** (1/2)	Alcaraz (4/9)	D. Medvedev (6/6)	**Sinner** (1/10)	Djokovic (39/40)	Hurkacz (2/2)	Djokovic (40/40)
2024	Alcaraz (5/9)	Sinner (2/10)	Tsitsipas (3/3)	Rublev (2/2)	Zverev (6/7)	**Popyrin** (1/1)	Sinner (3/10)	Sinner (4/10)	Zverev (7/7)
2025	**Draper** (1/1)	**Menšík** (1/1)	Alcaraz (6/9)	**Ruud** (1/1)	Alcaraz (7/9)	**Shelton** (1/2)	Alcaraz (8/9)	**Vacherot** (1/1)	Sinner (5/10)
2026	Sinner (6/10)	Sinner (7/10)	Sinner (8/10)	Sinner (9/10)	Sinner (10/10)	Shelton (2/2)	**Fils** (1/1)	**Davidovich Fokina** (1/1)	Alcaraz (9/9)
**Year**	**Indian Wells Open**	**Miami Open**	**Monte-Carlo Masters**	**Madrid Open**	**Italian Open**	**Canadian Open**	**Cincinnati Open**	**Shanghai Masters**	**Paris Masters**

== Title leaders ==
- **CA** (Canadian Open)
- **CI** (Cincinnati Open)
- **HA** (Hamburg Open)
- **IT** (Italian Open)
- **IW** (Indian Wells Open)
- **MA** (Madrid Open)
- **MC** (Monte-Carlo Masters)
- **MI** (Miami Open)
- **PA** (Paris Masters)
- **SH** (Shanghai Masters)
- **SM** (Stuttgart Masters)
- **ST** (Stockholm Open)

Active events	– Events not played
Defunct events	– Events not won

* Active players and most titles won per tournament are denoted in bold.

Titles	Player (Note: Players with 4+ titles listed. Active players and records are denoted in bold.)	IW	MI	MC	MA (Note: Current 4th event Madrid (clay) was held as the 8th event (indoor hard) between 2002 and 2008.)	IT	CA	CI	SH	PA	ST	SM	HA	Years
40	**Novak Djokovic**^{*}	**5***	**6***	2	3	6	4	3	**4***	**7***	–	–	–	2007–2023
36	Rafael Nadal	3	–	**11***	**5***	**10***	**5***	1	–	–	–	–	1	2005–2021
28	Roger Federer	**5***	4	–	3	–	2	**7***	2	1	–	–	**4***	2002–2019
17	Andre Agassi	1	**6***	–	1	1	3	3	–	2	–	–	–	1990–2004
14	Andy Murray	–	2	–	2	1	3	2	3	1	–	–	–	2008–2016
11	Pete Sampras	2	3	–	–	1	–	3	–	2	–	–	–	1992–2000
10	**Jannik Sinner**^{*}	1	2	1	1	1	1	1	1	1	–	–	–	2023–2026
9	**Carlos Alcaraz**^{*}	2	1	1	2	1	–	1	–	1	–	–	–	2022–2026
8	Thomas Muster	–	1	3	–	3	–	–	–	–	–	1	–	1990–1997
7	Michael Chang	3	1	–	–	–	1	2	–	–	–	–	–	1990–1997
7	**Alexander Zverev**^{*}	–	–	–	2	2	1	1	–	1	–	–	–	2017–2024
6	**Daniil Medvedev**^{*}	–	1	–	–	1	1	1	1	1	–	–	–	2019–2023
5	Boris Becker	–	–	–	–	–	–	–	–	1	**3***	1	–	1990–1996
5	Jim Courier	2	1	–	–	2	–	–	–	–	–	–	–	1991–1993
5	Marcelo Ríos	1	1	1	–	1	–	–	–	–	–	–	1	1997–1999
5	Gustavo Kuerten	–	–	2	–	1	–	1	–	–	–	–	1	1999–2001
5	Marat Safin	–	–	–	1	–	1	–	–	3	–	–	–	2000–2004
5	Andy Roddick	–	2	–	–	–	1	2	–	–	–	–	–	2003–2010
4	Stefan Edberg	1	–	–	–	–	–	1	–	1	–	–	1	1990–1992
4	Andrei Medvedev	–	–	1	–	–	–	–	–	–	–	–	3	1994–1997
4	Juan Carlos Ferrero	–	–	2	1	1	–	–	–	–	–	–	–	2001–2003
**Titles**	**Player**	**IW**	**MI**	**MC**	**MA**	**IT**	**CA**	**CI**	**SH**	**PA**	**ST**	**EU**	**HA**	**Years**

87 champions in 325 events as of 2026 Paris.

== Career Golden Masters ==
The achievement of winning an ATP Masters 1000 tournament in each of the 9 active slots over the course of a player's career.

- The event at which the Career Golden Masters was accomplished indicated in **bold**.

Player	Indian Wells (hard)	Miami (hard)	Monte Carlo (clay)	Madrid (clay)	Italy (clay)	Canada (hard)	Cincinnati (hard)	Shanghai (hard)	Paris (hard indoor)
Novak Djokovic	2008	2007	2013	2011	2008	2007	**2018**	2012	2009
Novak Djokovic	2011	2011	2015	2016	2011	2011	**2020**	2013	2013
Jannik Sinner	2026	2024	2026	2026	**2026**	2023	2024	2024	2025

== Career totals ==
- Active players denoted in **bold**.

Singles
No.	Titles
40	(Serbia) **Novak Djokovic**
36	(Spain) Rafael Nadal
28	(Switzerland) Roger Federer
17	(United States) Andre Agassi
14	(United Kingdom) Andy Murray
11	(United States) Pete Sampras
10	(Italy) **Jannik Sinner**
9	(Spain) **Carlos Alcaraz**
8	(Austria) Thomas Muster
7	(United States) Michael Chang
7	(Germany) **Alexander Zverev**

No.	Finals
60	**Novak Djokovic**
53	Rafael Nadal
50	Roger Federer
22	Andre Agassi
21	Andy Murray
19	Pete Sampras
14	(Italy) **Jannik Sinner**
13	**Alexander Zverev**
11	Boris Becker
11	**Daniil Medvedev**
11	**Carlos Alcaraz**

No.	Semifinals
80	**Novak Djokovic**
76	Rafael Nadal
66	Roger Federer
33	Andy Murray
32	Andre Agassi
31	Pete Sampras
28	**Alexander Zverev**
20	Andy Roddick
19	Lleyton Hewitt
19	Tomáš Berdych
19	**Daniil Medvedev**

No.	Quarterfinals
99	Rafael Nadal
97	**Novak Djokovic**
87	Roger Federer
51	Andy Murray
45	Pete Sampras
45	Tomáš Berdych
45	David Ferrer
44	Andre Agassi
40	**Alexander Zverev**
35	Andy Roddick

No.	Match wins
421	**Novak Djokovic**
410	Rafael Nadal
381	Roger Federer
230	Andy Murray
209	Andre Agassi
191	Tomáš Berdych
190	Pete Sampras
189	David Ferrer
187	**Alexander Zverev**
166	**Stan Wawrinka**

%	W–L	Match record
82.00	410–90	Rafael Nadal
80.92	123–29	(Italy) **Jannik Sinner**
80.81	421–100	**Novak Djokovic**
77.91	381–108	Roger Federer
74.11	209–73	Andre Agassi
73.08	190–70	Pete Sampras
72.00	108–42	Stefan Edberg
70.30	187–79	**Alexander Zverev**
69.49	230–101	Andy Murray
69.18	101–45	Thomas Muster
minimum 100 wins

Statistics correct as of the 2026 Paris Masters. To avoid double-counting, they are updated at the conclusion of a tournament or when the player's participation has ended.

== Season records ==
=== Season totals ===
No.	Titles	Year(s)	
6	Novak Djokovic	2015	
5	Novak Djokovic	2011	
5	Rafael Nadal	2013	
5	Jannik Sinner	2026	
4	Roger Federer	2	2005, 06
4	Novak Djokovic	2	2014, 16
4	Rafael Nadal	2005	
4+ titles

No.	Finals	Year(s)	
8	Novak Djokovic	2015	
6	Novak Djokovic	2	2011, 12
6	Rafael Nadal	2013	
6	Roger Federer	2006	
5	Rafael Nadal	4	2005, 07, 09, 11
5	Roger Federer	2	2007, 14
5	Novak Djokovic	2	2009, 16
5	Stefan Edberg	1990	
5	Andy Murray	2016	
5	Jannik Sinner	2026	
5+ finals

No.	Match wins	Year
39	Novak Djokovic	2015
35	Rafael Nadal	2013
34	Novak Djokovic	2012
34	Rafael Nadal	2009
34	Roger Federer	2006
Top 5

%	W–L	Match record	Year
100	29–0	Jannik Sinner	2026
97.1	33–1	Novak Djokovic	2011
96.4	27–1	Roger Federer	2005
95.1	39–2	Novak Djokovic	2015
93.3	28–2	Rafael Nadal	2005
Top 5

=== Most years of success ===
Most years of title success
Titles/yr	Player	Years	
**5**+	Novak Djokovic	2	2011, 15
**4**+	Novak Djokovic	4	2011–16
**3**+	Rafael Nadal	7	2005–18
**2**+	Novak Djokovic	12	2007–23
**1**+	Rafael Nadal	15	2005–21
**1**+	Novak Djokovic	15	2007–23

Most years of final appearances
Finals/yr	Player	Years	
**6**+	Novak Djokovic	3	2011–15
**5**+	Novak Djokovic	5	2009–16
**5**+	Rafael Nadal	5	2005–13
**4**+	Rafael Nadal	7	2005–17
**3**+	Novak Djokovic	11	2007–19
**2**+	Novak Djokovic	15	2007–23
**1**+	Novak Djokovic	18	2007–25

== Consecutive records ==
=== Spanning consecutive events ===
No.	Consecutive titles	Years	
6	Jannik Sinner	2025–26	
4	Novak Djokovic	3	2013–16
4	Rafael Nadal	2013	
3	Novak Djokovic	2	2011, 19–20
3	Rafael Nadal	2010	

No.	Consecutive finals	Years	
7	Novak Djokovic	2015–16	
6	Jannik Sinner	2025–26	
5	Rafael Nadal	2	2011, 13
4	Novak Djokovic	4	2011–15
4	Roger Federer	3	2006–10

No.	Match win streak	Years
34	Jannik Sinner	2025–26
31	Novak Djokovic	2011
30	Novak Djokovic (2)	2014–15
29	Roger Federer	2005–06
23	Rafael Nadal	2013
23	Novak Djokovic (3)	2013–14

=== Spanning non-consecutive events ===
No.	Titles streak	Years	
5	Novak Djokovic	2	2011, 14–15
4	Novak Djokovic	2	2011, 15
4	Roger Federer	2005–06	

No.	Finals streak	Years
11	Novak Djokovic	2014–16
7	Rafael Nadal	2012–13
7	Roger Federer	2005–06
6	Novak Djokovic	2011
5	Roger Federer	2017–18
5	Andy Murray	2016

No.	Final win streak	Years
12	Novak Djokovic	2012–15
9	Rafael Nadal	2005–07
9	Roger Federer	2004–06
8	Andre Agassi	1999–04
6	Andy Murray	2009–11
6	Pete Sampras	1992–95
6	Rafael Nadal	2018–21

=== Most consecutive years of title success ===
Titles/yr	Player	Consecutive years	
**4***+	Novak Djokovic	3	2014–16
**3***+	Novak Djokovic	6	2011–16
**2***+	Novak Djokovic	6	2011–16
**2***+	Rafael Nadal	6	2005–10
**1***+	Rafael Nadal	10	2005–14

== Tournament records ==
=== Most titles per tournament ===
Active
ATP 1000	No.	Player	Years
Indian Wells Open	5	Novak Djokovic	2007–16
Indian Wells Open	5	Roger Federer	2004–17
Miami Open	6	Novak Djokovic	2007–16
Miami Open	6	Andre Agassi	1990–2003
Monte-Carlo Masters	11	Rafael Nadal	2005–18
Madrid Open	5	Rafael Nadal	2005–17
Italian Open	10	Rafael Nadal	2005–21
Canadian Open	5 (Note: Ivan Lendl's record six Canadian Open titles before 1990 not counted.)	(Spain) Rafael Nadal	2005–19
Cincinnati Open	7	Roger Federer	2005–15
Shanghai Masters	4	Novak Djokovic	2012–18
Paris Masters	7	Novak Djokovic	2009–23

Defunct
ATP 1000	No.	Player	Years
Hamburg Masters	4	Roger Federer	2002–07
Stuttgart Masters	1	7 players	1995–2001
Stockholm Open	3	Boris Becker	1990–94

=== "In a single ATP Masters 1000 tournament" records ===
Most	No.	Player	Tournament	Years
Titles	11	Rafael Nadal	Monte-Carlo Masters	2005–18
Finals	12	Rafael Nadal	Monte-Carlo Masters	2005–18
Finals	12	Rafael Nadal	Italian Open	2005–21
Finals	12	Novak Djokovic	Italian Open	2008–22
Cons. titles	8	Rafael Nadal	Monte-Carlo Masters	2005–12
Cons. wins	46	Rafael Nadal	Monte-Carlo Masters	2005–13
Matches won	73	Rafael Nadal	Monte-Carlo Masters	2003–21
Matches played	81	Novak Djokovic	Italian Open	2007–26
Matches played	79	Rafael Nadal	Monte-Carlo Masters	2003–21
Matches played	79	Rafael Nadal	Italian Open	2005–24
Matches played	79	Roger Federer	Indian Wells Open	2001–19
Finals w/o win	5	Rafael Nadal	Miami Open	2005–17
Cons. finals lost	5	Rafael Nadal	Miami Open	2005–17
Cons. finals lost	5	Novak Djokovic	Cincinnati Open	2008–15
Finals lost	6	Novak Djokovic	Italian Open	2009–21
Entries	20	Rafael Nadal	Madrid Open	2003–24

=== Tournaments won with no sets dropped ===
No.	Player	Events
11	Novak Djokovic	Miami (2007, 2012, 2014, 2016), Paris (2014, 2019), Toronto (2016), Shanghai (2015, 2018 (Note: Won the tournament without having serve broken.)), Madrid (2019), Rome (2022)
8	Rafael Nadal	Monte Carlo (2007, 2008, 2010 (Note: Fewest games (14) lost winning a tournament.), 2012, 2018), Indian Wells (2007), Rome (2009, 2012)
7	Roger Federer	Indian Wells (2005, 2017) Hamburg (2005), Madrid (2006), Cincinnati (2012, 2015), Paris (2011)
4	Andy Murray	Rome (2016), Cincinnati (2011), Shanghai (2010, 2016)
3	Jannik Sinner (Note: Consecutive sets (37) won in the Masters series tournaments.)	Paris (2025), Indian Wells (2026), Miami (2026)
2	Pete Sampras	Cincinnati (1997, 1999)
2	Marcelo Ríos	Monte Carlo (1997), Rome (1998)
1	Ben Shelton	Montreal (2026)
1	Carlos Alcaraz	Indian Wells (2023)
1	Stefanos Tsitsipas	Monte Carlo (2021)
1	Daniil Medvedev	Shanghai (2019)
1	Alexander Zverev	Madrid (2018)
1	Grigor Dimitrov	Cincinnati (2017)
1	Carlos Moya	Cincinnati (2002)
1	Andre Agassi	Rome (2002)
1	Patrick Rafter	Montreal (1998)
1	Petr Korda	Stuttgart (1997)
1	Thomas Enqvist	Paris (1996)
1	Emilio Sanchez	Rome (1991)
1	Stefan Edberg	Paris (1990)
1	Boris Becker	Stockholm (1990)

=== Tournaments won on different surfaces ===
Singles
No.	Player	Events
9	Roger Federer	Indian Wells (hard), Miami (hard), Hamburg (clay), Madrid (clay), Madrid (hard), Cincinnati (hard), Canada (hard), Shanghai (hard), Paris (hard)
9	Novak Djokovic	Indian Wells (hard), Miami (hard), Monte Carlo (clay), Madrid (clay), Rome (clay), Cincinnati (hard), Canada (hard), Shanghai (hard), Paris (hard)
9	Jannik Sinner	Indian Wells (hard), Miami (hard), Monte Carlo (clay), Madrid (clay), Rome (clay), Cincinnati (hard), Canada (hard), Shanghai (hard), Paris (hard)
8	Rafael Nadal	Indian Wells (hard), Hamburg (clay), Monte Carlo (clay), Madrid (clay), Rome (clay), Cincinnati (hard), Canada (hard), Madrid (hard)
8	Andy Murray	Miami (hard), Madrid (clay), Rome (clay), Cincinnati (hard), Canada (hard), Madrid (hard), Shanghai (hard), Paris (hard)
7	Andre Agassi	Indian Wells (hard), Miami (hard), Rome (clay), Cincinnati (hard), Canada (hard), Madrid (hard), Paris (carpet)
7	Carlos Alcaraz	Indian Wells (hard), Miami (hard), Madrid (clay), Monte Carlo (clay), Rome (clay), Cincinnati (hard), Paris (hard)

== Player achievements ==
=== "In all ATP Masters 1000 tournaments" records ===
Most	No.	Player
Hardcourt titles	29	Novak Djokovic
Hardcourt titles	22	Roger Federer
Claycourt titles	26	Rafael Nadal
Claycourt titles	11	Novak Djokovic
Different titles	9	Novak Djokovic
Different titles	9	Jannik Sinner
Different titles	8	Roger Federer (Note: 7 currently active tournaments + Hamburg.)
Different finals	10 (Note: 9 currently active tournaments + Hamburg.)	Roger Federer
Different finals	10	Rafael Nadal
Matches played	521	Novak Djokovic
Matches played	500	Rafael Nadal
Entries	141	Novak Djokovic
Entries	139	Feliciano López

=== Surface titles across a career ===
Surface	Player	Different tournaments won	
Hard	Roger Federer	7	Indian Wells Open, Miami Open, Canadian Open, Cincinnati Open, Madrid Open / Shanghai Masters, (Note: Madrid (2002–2008), Shanghai (2009–present).); Paris Masters (Note: (2007–present).)
Hard	Novak Djokovic (3)	6	Indian Wells Open, Miami Open, Canadian Open, Cincinnati Open, Madrid Open / Shanghai Masters, Paris Masters
Hard	Jannik Sinner	6	Indian Wells Open, Miami Open, Canadian Open, Cincinnati Open, Madrid Open / Shanghai Masters, Paris Masters
Clay	Rafael Nadal	4	Monte-Carlo Masters, Hamburg Masters / Madrid Open, (Note: Hamburg (1990–2008), Madrid (2009–present).); Italian Open
Clay	Marcelo Ríos	3	Monte-Carlo Masters, Hamburg Masters / Madrid Open, Italian Open
Clay	Gustavo Kuerten	3	Monte-Carlo Masters, Hamburg Masters / Madrid Open, Italian Open
Clay	Rafael Nadal (4)	3	Monte-Carlo Masters, Hamburg Masters / Madrid Open, Italian Open
Clay	Novak Djokovic (2)	3	Monte-Carlo Masters, Hamburg Masters / Madrid Open, Italian Open
Clay	Carlos Alcaraz	3	Monte-Carlo Masters, Hamburg Masters / Madrid Open, Italian Open
Clay	Jannik Sinner	3	Monte-Carlo Masters, Hamburg Masters / Madrid Open, Italian Open
Carpet	Boris Becker	3	Stockholm Open / Stuttgart Open, (Note: Stockholm (1990), Stuttgart (1995–1997).); Paris Masters (Note: (1990–2006).)

=== Youngest & oldest ===
Youngest	Winner	18 years, 5 months	Michael Chang	1990 Canada
Youngest	Finalist	18 years, 5 months	Michael Chang	1990 Canada
Youngest	Qualifier	15 years, 9 months	Richard Gasquet	2002 Monte Carlo
Oldest	Winner	37 years, 7 months	Roger Federer	2019 Miami
Oldest	Finalist	37 years, 10 months	Novak Djokovic	2025 Miami
Oldest	Qualifier	40 years, 5 months	Ivo Karlović	2019 Cincinnati
Oldest	Debutant	29 years, 1 month	Andrea Pellegrino	2026 Rome

=== Wins on different surfaces at the same tournament ===
No.	Player	Tournament	Surfaces
3	Roger Federer	Madrid	Hard indoors, Red clay, Blue clay
2	Boris Becker	Stockholm	Carpet, Hard indoors
2	Rafael Nadal	Madrid	Hard indoors, Red clay
2	Andy Murray	Madrid	Hard indoors, Red clay

== Calendar title combinations ==
- **Back-to-back** tournament titles.
- Currently active combinations in **bold.**

=== Five consecutive ===
Combination	Winner	Year
Indian Wells—Miami—Monte Carlo—Madrid—Rome	Jannik Sinner	2026

=== Four consecutive ===
Combination	Winner	Year
Madrid—Rome—Canada—Cincinnati	Rafael Nadal	2013

=== Three consecutive ===
Combination	Winner	Year
Indian Wells—Miami—Monte Carlo	Novak Djokovic	2015
Indian Wells—Miami—Monte Carlo	Jannik Sinner	2026
Monte Carlo—Madrid—Rome	Rafael Nadal	2010
Monte Carlo—Madrid—Rome	Jannik Sinner	2026

=== Two consecutive ===
Combination	Winner	Year(s)	
Indian Wells—Miami "Sunshine double"	Novak Djokovic	4	2011, 14–16
Indian Wells—Miami "Sunshine double"	Roger Federer	3	2005–06, 17
Indian Wells—Miami "Sunshine double"	Jim Courier	1991	
Indian Wells—Miami "Sunshine double"	Michael Chang	1992	
Indian Wells—Miami "Sunshine double"	Pete Sampras	1994	
Indian Wells—Miami "Sunshine double"	Marcelo Ríos	1998	
Indian Wells—Miami "Sunshine double"	Andre Agassi	2001	
Indian Wells—Miami "Sunshine double"	Jannik Sinner	2026	
Madrid—Rome	Rafael Nadal	2	2010, 13
Madrid—Rome	Novak Djokovic	2011	
Madrid—Rome	Jannik Sinner	2026	
Canada—Cincinnati	Andre Agassi	1995	
Canada—Cincinnati	Patrick Rafter	1998	
Canada—Cincinnati	Andy Roddick	2003	
Canada—Cincinnati	Rafael Nadal	2013	
Shanghai/Madrid–Paris (Note: In 2009, Shanghai replaced Madrid as the 8th Masters event. Madrid was moved to the clay season.)	Novak Djokovic	2	2013, 15
Shanghai/Madrid–Paris	Marat Safin	2004	
Shanghai/Madrid–Paris	David Nalbandian	2007	
Shanghai/Madrid–Paris	Andy Murray	2016	

== Title defence ==
- Note: Currently active tournaments in **bold.**

**Hard**

Tournament	Player	Consecutive titles	
Indian Wells	Roger Federer	3	2004–06
Indian Wells	Novak Djokovic	3	2014–16
Indian Wells	Pete Sampras	2	1994–95
Indian Wells	Michael Chang	2	1996–97
Indian Wells	Lleyton Hewitt	2	2002–03
Indian Wells	Carlos Alcaraz	2	2023–24
Miami	Andre Agassi	3	2001–03
Miami	Novak Djokovic	3	2014–16
Miami	Pete Sampras	2	1993–94
Miami	Andre Agassi	2	1995–96
Miami	Roger Federer	2	2005–06
Miami	Novak Djokovic	2	2011–12
Canada	Andre Agassi	2	1994–95
Canada	Andy Murray	2	2009–10
Canada	Novak Djokovic	2	2011–12
Canada	Rafael Nadal	2	2018–19
Canada	Ben Shelton	2	2025–26
Cincinnati	Michael Chang	2	1993–94
Cincinnati	Andre Agassi	2	1995–96
Cincinnati	Roger Federer	2	2009–10
Cincinnati	Roger Federer	2	2014–15
Shanghai	Andy Murray	2	2010–11
Shanghai	Novak Djokovic	2	2012–13
Paris	Novak Djokovic	3	2013–15

**Clay**

Tournament	Player	Consecutive titles	
Monte Carlo	Rafael Nadal	8	2005–12
Monte Carlo	Rafael Nadal	3	2016–18
Monte Carlo	Juan Carlos Ferrero	2	1995–96
Monte Carlo	Thomas Muster	2	2002–03
Monte Carlo	Stefanos Tsitsipas	2	2021–22
Madrid	Rafael Nadal	2	2013–14
Madrid	Carlos Alcaraz	2	2022–23
Rome	Rafael Nadal	3	2005–07
Rome	Rafael Nadal	2	2009–10
Rome	Rafael Nadal	2	2012–13
Rome	Rafael Nadal	2	2018–19
Rome	Jim Courier	2	1992–93
Rome	Thomas Muster	2	1995–96
Rome	Novak Djokovic	2	2014–15
Hamburg	Andrei Medvedev	2	1994–95
Hamburg	Roger Federer	2	2004–05

**Carpet**

Tournament	Player	Consecutive titles	
Stockholm	Boris Becker	2	1990–91 (Note: In 1991, Stockholm was played on hard courts.)

- Djokovic has retained a record **6*** different tournaments (Indian Wells, Miami, Rome, Canada, Shanghai, Paris).
- Nadal has retained a tournament on a record **16*** occasions across multiple seasons (Monte Carlo, Madrid, Rome, Canada).

== Statistics ==
=== Seeds statistics ===
==== No. 1 vs. No. 2 seeds in final ====
W The top seed won the final. L The second seed won the final.

* The top 2 seeds were also the top 2-ranked players in the rankings.

Year	Event	Top seed	W/L	Second seed
1990	Stockholm*	Stefan Edberg	L	Boris Becker
1990	Paris*	Stefan Edberg	W	Boris Becker
1991	Stockholm*	Stefan Edberg	L	Boris Becker
1995	Indian Wells*	Pete Sampras	W	Andre Agassi
1995	Miami*	Pete Sampras	L	Andre Agassi
1995	Canada*	Andre Agassi	W	Pete Sampras
1999	Cincinnati	Pete Sampras	W	Pat Rafter
2004	Hamburg	Roger Federer	W	Guillermo Coria
2004	Canada*	Roger Federer	W	Andy Roddick
2005	Indian Wells*	Roger Federer	W	Lleyton Hewitt
2006	Monte Carlo*	Roger Federer	L	Rafael Nadal
2006	Rome*	Roger Federer	L	Rafael Nadal
2007	Monte Carlo*	Roger Federer	L	Rafael Nadal
2007	Hamburg*	Roger Federer	W	Rafael Nadal
2008	Monte Carlo*	Roger Federer	L	Rafael Nadal
2008	Hamburg*	Roger Federer	L	Rafael Nadal
2009	Madrid*	Rafael Nadal	L	Roger Federer
2010	Madrid*	Roger Federer	L	Rafael Nadal
2011	Miami*	Rafael Nadal	L	Novak Djokovic
2011	Madrid*	Rafael Nadal	L	Novak Djokovic
2011	Rome*	Rafael Nadal	L	Novak Djokovic

Year	Event	Top seed	W/L	Second seed
2012	Monte Carlo*	Novak Djokovic	L	Rafael Nadal
2012	Rome*	Novak Djokovic	L	Rafael Nadal
2012	Cincinnati*	Roger Federer	W	Novak Djokovic
2014	Miami*	Rafael Nadal	L	Novak Djokovic
2014	Rome*	Rafael Nadal	L	Novak Djokovic
2015	Indian Wells*	Novak Djokovic	W	Roger Federer
2015	Rome*	Novak Djokovic	W	Roger Federer
2015	Canada	Novak Djokovic	L	Andy Murray
2015	Cincinnati	Novak Djokovic	L	Roger Federer
2015	Paris	Novak Djokovic	W	Andy Murray
2016	Madrid*	Novak Djokovic	W	Andy Murray
2016	Rome*	Novak Djokovic	L	Andy Murray
2017	Shanghai*	Rafael Nadal	L	Roger Federer
2018	Rome	Rafael Nadal	W	Alexander Zverev
2019	Rome*	Novak Djokovic	L	Rafael Nadal
2021	Rome*	Novak Djokovic	L	Rafael Nadal
2021	Paris*	Novak Djokovic	W	Daniil Medvedev
2023	Cincinnati*	Carlos Alcaraz	L	Novak Djokovic
2025	Cincinnati*	Jannik Sinner	L	Carlos Alcaraz
2026	Monte Carlo*	Carlos Alcaraz	L	Jannik Sinner
2026	Madrid	Jannik Sinner	W	Alexander Zverev

==== Most finals contested between two players ====
Finals	Players		Result
14	Novak Djokovic	Rafael Nadal	7–7
12	Rafael Nadal	Roger Federer	7–5
10	Novak Djokovic	Andy Murray	5–5
8	Novak Djokovic	Roger Federer	5–3
5	Andre Agassi	Pete Sampras	3–2

==== Top 4 seeds in semifinals ====
- Tournament winner in **bold.**

Year	Event	Seeds			
1999	Cincinnati	1. **Pete Sampras**	2. Patrick Rafter	3. Andre Agassi	4. Yevgeny Kafelnikov
2008	Monte Carlo	1. Roger Federer	2. **Rafael Nadal**	3. Novak Djokovic	4. Nikolay Davydenko
2009	Cincinnati	1. **Roger Federer**	2. Rafael Nadal	3. Andy Murray	4. Novak Djokovic
2010	Canada	1. Rafael Nadal	2. Novak Djokovic	3. Roger Federer	4. **Andy Murray**
2012	Shanghai	1. Roger Federer	2. **Novak Djokovic**	3. Andy Murray	4. Tomáš Berdych
2021	Cincinnati	1. Daniil Medvedev	2. Stefanos Tsitsipas	3. **Alexander Zverev**	4. Andrey Rublev

==== Top 8 seeds in quarterfinals ====
- Tournament winner in **bold.**

Year	Event	Seeds			
2009	Canada	1. Roger Federer	2. Rafael Nadal	3. **Andy Murray**	4. Novak Djokovic
2009	Canada	5. Andy Roddick	6. Juan Martín del Potro	7. Jo-Wilfried Tsonga	8. Nikolay Davydenko

==== 15 of Top-16 seeds in R16 ====
- Tournament winner in **bold.**

Year	Event	Seeds			
2015	Monte Carlo	1. **Novak Djokovic**	2. Roger Federer	3. Rafael Nadal	4. Milos Raonic
2015	Monte Carlo	5. David Ferrer	6. Tomáš Berdych	7. Stan Wawrinka	8. Marin Čilić
2015	Monte Carlo	9. Grigor Dimitrov	10. Gilles Simon	11. Jo-Wilfried Tsonga	12. Roberto Bautista Agut
2015	Monte Carlo	14. Gaël Monfils	15. John Isner	16. Tommy Robredo	

==== Qualifiers in final ====
W Qualifier won the final. L Qualifier lost the final.

Year	Event	Qualifier	W/L	Opponent
1991	Rome	Alberto Mancini	L	Emilio Sánchez
1996	Hamburg	Roberto Carretero	W	Àlex Corretja
2000	Canada	Harel Levy	L	Marat Safin
2001	Hamburg	Albert Portas	W	Juan Carlos Ferrero
2001	Stuttgart	Max Mirnyi	L	Tommy Haas
2004	Paris	Radek Štěpánek	L	Marat Safin
2005	Hamburg	Richard Gasquet	L	Roger Federer
2007	Miami	Guillermo Cañas	L	Novak Djokovic
2012	Paris	Jerzy Janowicz	L	David Ferrer
2017	Paris	Filip Krajinović	L	Jack Sock
2025	Shanghai	Valentin Vacherot	W	Arthur Rinderknech

==== Lucky Losers in final ====
W Lucky Loser won the final. L Lucky Loser lost the final.

Year	Event	Lucky Loser	W/L	Opponent
2023	Madrid	Jan-Lennard Struff	L	Carlos Alcaraz

==== No seeds in final ====
Year	Event	Winner	Runner-up
1996	Hamburg	Roberto Carretero	Àlex Corretja
2003	Paris	Tim Henman	Andrei Pavel
2025	Shanghai	Valentin Vacherot	Arthur Rinderknech

=== Match statistics ===
Shortest
28 minutes
2014 Miami First Round
Jarkko Nieminen	**6**	**6**
Bernard Tomic	0	1

=== Age statistics ===
**Youngest winners**
Age	Winner	First title
18 years, 157 days	Michael Chang	1990 Canada
18 years, 318 days	Rafael Nadal	2005 Monte Carlo
18 years, 333 days	Carlos Alcaraz	2022 Miami
19 years, 191 days	Holger Rune	2022 Paris
19 years, 210 days	Jakub Menšík	2025 Miami

**Oldest winners**
Age	Winner	Last title
37 years, 235 days	Roger Federer	2019 Miami
36 years, 167 days	Novak Djokovic	2023 Paris
34 years, 347 days	Rafael Nadal	2021 Rome
34 years, 101 days	Andre Agassi	2004 Cincinnati
32 years, 340 days	John Isner	2018 Miami

=== All countrymen statistics ===
==== All countrymen in final ====
Year	Event	Winner	Runner-up
1990	Canada	Michael Chang	Jay Berger
1991	Miami	Jim Courier	David Wheaton
1992	Canada	Andre Agassi	Ivan Lendl
1992	Cincinnati	Pete Sampras	Ivan Lendl
1993	Miami	Pete Sampras	MaliVai Washington
1994	Miami	Pete Sampras	Andre Agassi
1995	Indian Wells	Pete Sampras	Andre Agassi
1995	Miami	Andre Agassi	Pete Sampras
1995	Canada	Andre Agassi	Pete Sampras
1995	Cincinnati	Andre Agassi	Michael Chang
1996	Hamburg	Roberto Carretero	Àlex Corretja
1996	Cincinnati	Andre Agassi	Michael Chang
1998	Hamburg	Albert Costa	Àlex Corretja
2001	Indian Wells	Andre Agassi	Pete Sampras
2001	Miami	Andre Agassi	Jan-Michael Gambill
2001	Hamburg	Albert Portas	Juan Carlos Ferrero

Year	Event	Winner	Runner-up
2002	Monte Carlo	Juan Carlos Ferrero	Carlos Moyá
2003	Hamburg	Guillermo Coria	Agustín Calleri
2003	Cincinnati	Andy Roddick	Mardy Fish
2010	Monte Carlo	Rafael Nadal	Fernando Verdasco
2010	Rome	Rafael Nadal	David Ferrer
2011	Monte Carlo	Rafael Nadal	David Ferrer
2014	Monte Carlo	Stan Wawrinka	Roger Federer
2017	Indian Wells	Roger Federer	Stan Wawrinka
2017	Monte Carlo	Rafael Nadal	Albert Ramos Viñolas
2026	Canada	Ben Shelton	Brandon Nakashima
2026	Shanghai	Alejandro Davidovich Fokina	Rafael Jódar

==== All countrymen in semifinals ====
- Tournament winner in **bold.**

Year	Event	Country	Finalists	Semifinalists
2003	Hamburg	ARG	Agustín Calleri	David Nalbandian
2003	Hamburg	ARG	**Guillermo Coria**	Gastón Gaudio

== Titles won by decade ==
as of 2026 Paris.

=== 1990s === : 10 / **Agassi, Sampras**; 8 / Muster; 7 / Chang; 5 / Becker, Courier, Ríos; 4 / Edberg, A. Medvedev; 2 / Bruguera, Chesnokov, Enqvist, Forget, Ivanišević, Krajicek, Kuerten, Rafter, Stich; 1 / Aguilera, Carretero, Corretja, Costa, Ferreira, Johansson, Korda, Moyá, Nováček, Pernfors, Philippoussis, Rusedski, Sánchez, Woodruff; === 2000s === : 16 / **Federer**; 15 / Nadal; 7 / Agassi; 5 / Djokovic, Safin; 4 / Ferrero, Murray, Roddick; 3 / Davydenko, Kuerten; 2 / Coria, Hewitt, Moyá, Nalbandian; 1 / Berdych, Cañas, Corretja, Enqvist, Ferreira, Grosjean, Haas, Henman, Mantilla, Norman, Pavel, Pioline, Portas, Robredo, Sampras, Tsonga	=== 2010s === : 29 / **Djokovic**; 20 / Nadal; 12 / Federer; 10 / Murray; 3 / Zverev; 2 / D. Medvedev; 1 / Čilić, del Potro, Dimitrov, Ferrer, Fognini, Isner, Khachanov, Ljubičić, Roddick, Sock, Söderling, Thiem, Tsonga, Wawrinka; === 2020s === : 10 / **Sinner**; 9 / Alcaraz; 6 / Djokovic; 4 / D. Medvedev, Zverev; 3 / Tsitsipas; 2 / Hurkacz, Rublev, Shelton; 1 / Carreño Busta, Ćorić, Davidovich Fokina, Draper, Fils, Fritz, Menšík, Nadal, Norrie, Popyrin, Rune, Ruud, Vacherot

== Titles by country ==
as of 2026 Paris.

66	Spain (16 players)

51	United States (10 players)

40	Serbia (1 player)

29	Switzerland (2 players)

18	Great Britain (5 players)

15	Germany (4 players), Soviet Union / Russia (5 players) (Note: Not including Daniil Medvedev's two titles and Andrey Rublev's two titles in 2023–2024.)

11	Italy (2 players), Sweden (6 players)

9	Austria (2 players)

7	France (5 players)

6	Argentina (4 players), Australia (4 players)

5	Brazil (1 player), Chile (1 player), Croatia (4 players)

4	Czechoslovakia / Czech Republic (4 players), Ukraine (1 player)

3	Greece (1 player)

2	Netherlands (1 player), Poland (1 player), South Africa (1 player)

1	Bulgaria, Denmark, Monaco, Norway, Romania

== See also ==
**ATP Tour**

- ATP Masters 1000 tournaments
- ATP Masters 1000 doubles records and statistics
- Grand Prix Super Series

**WTA Tour**

- WTA 1000 tournaments
- WTA 1000 Series singles records and statistics
- WTA 1000 Series doubles records and statistics
