= 2014 Monte-Carlo Rolex Masters – Singles =

Singles
- 2014 Monte-Carlo Rolex Masters

Final
- Champion: (Switzerland) Stan Wawrinka
- Runner-up: (Switzerland) Roger Federer
- Score: 4–6, 7–6^{(7–5)}, 6–2

Details
- Draw: 56 (7 Q / 3 WC )
- Seeds: 16

Events
Singles	Doubles
← 2013 ·	Monte-Carlo Rolex Masters	· 2015 →

Stan Wawrinka defeated Roger Federer in the final, 4–6, 7–6^{(7–5)}, 6–2 to win the singles tennis title at the 2014 Monte-Carlo Masters. It was his first Masters 1000 title. It was Federer's fourth runner-up finish at the Monte-Carlo Masters (following defeats to Rafael Nadal in 2006, 2007, and 2008), his career-best finish at the event.

Novak Djokovic was the defending champion, but lost to Federer in the semifinals.

== Seeds ==
The top eight seeds receive a bye into the second round.

1. (Spain) Rafael Nadal (quarterfinals)
2. (Serbia) Novak Djokovic (semifinals)
3. (Switzerland) Stan Wawrinka (champion)
4. (Switzerland) Roger Federer (final)
5. (Czech Republic) Tomáš Berdych (third round)
6. (Spain) David Ferrer (semifinals)
7. (France) ~~Richard Gasquet~~ (withdrew because of a lumbar injury)
8. (Canada) Milos Raonic (quarterfinals)
9. (France) Jo-Wilfried Tsonga (quarterfinals)
10. (Italy) Fabio Fognini (third round)
11. (Spain) Tommy Robredo (third round)
12. (Bulgaria) Grigor Dimitrov (third round)
13. (Russia) Mikhail Youzhny (first round)
14. (South Africa) Kevin Anderson (first round)
15. (Spain) Nicolás Almagro (third round, withdrew because of a foot injury)
16. (Poland) Jerzy Janowicz (first round)
17. (Ukraine) Alexandr Dolgopolov (second round)

Click on the seed number of a player to go to their draw section.

== Draw ==
=== Key ===
- Q = Qualifier
- WC = Wild card
- LL = Lucky loser
- Alt = Alternate
- SE = Special exempt
- PR = Protected ranking
- ITF = ITF entry
- JE = Junior exempt
- w/o = Walkover
- r = Retired
- d = Defaulted
- SR = Special ranking

=== Finals ===
Quarterfinals
1	(Spain) Rafael Nadal	6^{1}	4
6	(Spain) David Ferrer	7^{7}	6
3	(Switzerland) Stan Wawrinka	7^{7}	6
8	(Canada) Milos Raonic	6^{5}	2
9	(France) Jo-Wilfried Tsonga	6	6^{6}	1
4/WC	(Switzerland) Roger Federer	2	7^{8}	6
(Spain) Guillermo García López	6	3	1
2	(Serbia) Novak Djokovic	4	6	6

Semifinals
6	(Spain) David Ferrer	1	6^{3}
3	(Switzerland) Stan Wawrinka	6	7^{7}
4/WC	(Switzerland) Roger Federer	7	6
2	(Serbia) Novak Djokovic	5	2

Final
3	(Switzerland) Stan Wawrinka	4	7^{7}	6
4/WC	(Switzerland) Roger Federer	6	6^{5}	2

=== Top half ===
==== Section 1 ====
First round
Q	(Russia) T Gabashvili	4	6	6
(France) G Simon	6	4	4
(France) É Roger-Vasselin	6	5	6^{5}
(Spain) P Andújar	2	7	7^{7}
(Italy) A Seppi	6	7^{7}
13	(Russia) M Youzhny	3	6^{4}
12	(Bulgaria) G Dimitrov	6	4	6
(Spain) M Granollers	2	6	2
Q	(Spain) A Ramos	6	7
(Finland) J Nieminen	2	5
(Netherlands) I Sijsling	6	2	6^{5}
(France) J Chardy	1	6	7^{7}

Second round
1	(Spain) R Nadal	6	6
Q	(Russia) T Gabashvili	4	1
(Spain) P Andújar	6^{5}	7	4
(Italy) A Seppi	7^{7}	5	6
12	(Bulgaria) G Dimitrov	4	6	6
Q	(Spain) A Ramos	6	3	4
(France) J Chardy	3	0
6	(Spain) D Ferrer	6	6

Third round
1	(Spain) R Nadal	6	6
(Italy) A Seppi	1	3
12	(Bulgaria) G Dimitrov	4	2
6	(Spain) D Ferrer	6	6

Quarterfinals
1	(Spain) R Nadal	6^{1}	4
6	(Spain) D Ferrer	7^{7}	6

==== Section 2 ====
First round
(Croatia) M Čilić	6	3	6
LL	(Australia) M Matosevic	1	6	2
(France) N Mahut	4	6	6
WC	(Austria) D Thiem	6	3	2
Q	(France) P-H Mathieu	3	2
15	(Spain) N Almagro	6	6
11	(Spain) T Robredo	6	6
Q	(Belgium) D Goffin	4	1
(France) J Benneteau	6	3	6
(Austria) J Melzer	4	6	4
(Argentina) F Delbonis	6^{5}	1
(Chinese Taipei) Y-h Lu	7^{7}	6

Second round
3	(Switzerland) S Wawrinka	6	6
(Croatia) M Čilić	0	2
(France) N Mahut	6^{3}	3
15	(Spain) N Almagro	7^{7}	6
11	(Spain) T Robredo	4	6	6
(France) J Benneteau	6	0	1
(Chinese Taipei) Y-h Lu	7^{7}	2	1
8	(Canada) M Raonic	6^{4}	6	6

Third round
3	(Switzerland) S Wawrinka	w/o
15	(Spain) N Almagro
11	(Spain) T Robredo	4	3
8	(Canada) M Raonic	6	6

Quarterfinals
3	(Switzerland) S Wawrinka	7^{7}	6
8	(Canada) M Raonic	6^{5}	2

=== Bottom half ===
==== Section 3 ====
First round
(Germany) P Kohlschreiber	6	6
WC	(Italy) S Bolelli	3	4
(Spain) R Bautista Agut	6	6
(Canada) V Pospisil	2	2
(Portugal) J Sousa	7	5	4
10	(Italy) F Fognini	5	7	6
16	(Poland) J Janowicz	4	2
Q	(France) M Llodra	6	6
Q	(Russia) E Donskoy	5	1
(Czech Republic) L Rosol	7	6
(Czech Republic) R Štěpánek	6	6
(Croatia) I Karlović	1	2

Second round
9	(France) J-W Tsonga	6	1	6
(Germany) P Kohlschreiber	4	6	4
(Spain) R Bautista Agut	6^{6}	4
10	(Italy) F Fognini	7^{8}	6
Q	(France) M Llodra	4	4
(Czech Republic) L Rosol	6	6
(Czech Republic) R Štěpánek	1	2
4/WC	(Switzerland) R Federer	6	6

Third round
9	(France) J-W Tsonga	5	6	6
10	(Italy) F Fognini	7	3	0
(Czech Republic) L Rosol	4	1
4/WC	(Switzerland) R Federer	6	6

Quarterfinals
9	(France) J-W Tsonga	6	6^{6}	1
4/WC	(Switzerland) R Federer	2	7^{8}	6

==== Section 4 ====
First round
(Netherlands) R Haase	1	7	3
(Russia) D Tursunov	6	5	6
WC	(Monaco) B Balleret	5	2
(Spain) G García López	7	6
(Latvia) E Gulbis	2	4
17	(Ukraine) A Dolgopolov	6	6
14	(South Africa) K Anderson	4	6^{4}
(France) G Monfils	6	7^{7}
LL	(Spain) P Carreño Busta	6	6
(Croatia) I Dodig	3	3
(France) B Paire	5	6	2
Q	(Spain) A Montañés	7	4	6

Second round
5	(Czech Republic) T Berdych	7	6
(Russia) D Tursunov	5	4
(Spain) G García López	6	7
17	(Ukraine) A Dolgopolov	1	5
(France) G Monfils	3	6^{6}
LL	(Spain) P Carreño Busta	6	7^{8}
Q	(Spain) A Montañés	1	0
2	(Serbia) N Djokovic	6	6

Third round
5	(Czech Republic) T Berdych	6	3	1
(Spain) G García López	4	6	6
LL	(Spain) P Carreño Busta	0	1
2	(Serbia) N Djokovic	6	6

Quarterfinals
(Spain) G García López	6	3	1
2	(Serbia) N Djokovic	4	6	6

== Qualifying ==
=== Seeds ===
1. (Uzbekistan) Denis Istomin (first round, retired)
2. (Kazakhstan) Mikhail Kukushkin (first round)
3. (Spain) Albert Montañés (qualified)
4. (Russia) Teymuraz Gabashvili (qualified)
5. (Argentina) Carlos Berlocq (first round)
6. (France) Kenny de Schepper (first round)
7. (Spain) Pablo Carreño Busta (Qualifying competition, lucky loser)
8. (Australia) Marinko Matosevic (Qualifying competition, lucky loser)
9. (Poland) Michał Przysiężny (first round)
10. (Serbia) Dušan Lajović (first round, retired)
11. (Kazakhstan) Aleksandr Nedovyesov (first round)
12. (Italy) Filippo Volandri (qualifying competition)
13. (Poland) Łukasz Kubot (qualifying competition)
14. (France) Stéphane Robert (qualifying competition)

=== Qualifiers ===
1. (Belgium) David Goffin
2. (France) Paul-Henri Mathieu
3. (Spain) Albert Montañés
4. (Russia) Teymuraz Gabashvili
5. (Spain) Albert Ramos
6. (France) Michaël Llodra
7. (Russia) Evgeny Donskoy

=== Lucky losers ===
1. (Spain) Pablo Carreño Busta
2. (Australia) Marinko Matosevic

=== Qualifying draw ===
==== First qualifier ====
First round
1	(Uzbekistan) Denis Istomin	4	1^{r}
(Belgium) David Goffin	6	2
(Argentina) Leonardo Mayer	3	4
14	(France) Stéphane Robert	6	6

Qualifying competition
(Belgium) David Goffin	6	4	6
14	(France) Stéphane Robert	0	6	3

==== Second qualifier ====
First round
2	(Kazakhstan) Mikhail Kukushkin	3	4
(France) Paul-Henri Mathieu	6	6
WC	(Monaco) Romain Arneodo	6	6^{6}	4
10	(Serbia) Dušan Lajović	1	7^{8}	2^{r}

Qualifying competition
(France) Paul-Henri Mathieu	6	6
WC	(Monaco) Romain Arneodo	4	2

==== Third qualifier ====
First round
3	(Spain) Albert Montañés	6	6
(Brazil) Thomaz Bellucci	1	4
WC	(Monaco) Thomas Oger	4	6	1
8	(Australia) Marinko Matosevic	6	3	6

Qualifying competition
3	(Spain) Albert Montañés	6	6
8	(Australia) Marinko Matosevic	4	2

==== Fourth qualifier ====
First round
4	(Russia) Teymuraz Gabashvili	6	6
(Ukraine) Sergiy Stakhovsky	4	4
(Germany) Michael Berrer	7^{7}	6^{3}	0
12	(Italy) Filippo Volandri	6^{3}	7^{7}	6

Qualifying competition
4	(Russia) Teymuraz Gabashvili	6	6
12	(Italy) Filippo Volandri	0	2

==== Fifth qualifier ====
First round
5	(Argentina) Carlos Berlocq	5	6	4
(Spain) Albert Ramos	7	0	6
(Spain) Daniel Gimeno Traver	6	1	6^{4}
13	(Poland) Łukasz Kubot	2	6	7^{7}

Qualifying competition
(Spain) Albert Ramos	6	7
13	(Poland) Łukasz Kubot	4	5

==== Sixth qualifier ====
First round
6	(France) Kenny de Schepper	6^{1}	2
WC	(Italy) Potito Starace	7^{7}	6
WC	(France) Michaël Llodra	6	6
9	(Poland) Michał Przysiężny	1	4

Qualifying competition
WC	(Italy) Potito Starace	2	7	3
WC	(France) Michaël Llodra	6	5	6

==== Seventh qualifier ====
First round
7	(Spain) Pablo Carreño Busta	5	6	6
(Germany) Jan-Lennard Struff	7	4	2
(Russia) Evgeny Donskoy	7	6
11	(Kazakhstan) Aleksandr Nedovyesov	5	4

Qualifying competition
7	(Spain) Pablo Carreño Busta	1	6	6^{2}
(Russia) Evgeny Donskoy	6	4	7^{7}
