= 2006 Monte Carlo Masters – Singles =

Singles
- 2006 Monte Carlo Masters

Final
- Champion: (Spain) Rafael Nadal
- Runner-up: (Switzerland) Roger Federer
- Score: 6–2, 6–7^{(2–7)}, 6–3, 7–6^{(7–5)}

Details
- Draw: 64 (8 Q / 4 WC / 1 LL )
- Seeds: 16

Events
Singles	Doubles
← 2005 ·	Monte Carlo Masters	· 2007 →

Defending champion Rafael Nadal defeated Roger Federer in the final, 6–2, 6–7^{(2–7)}, 6–3, 7–6^{(7–5)} to win the singles tennis title at the 2006 Monte Carlo Masters.

This tournament marked the first professional-level match played between Novak Djokovic and Federer, who would go on to play a total of 50 ATP Tour-level matches against each other; Federer won their first-round encounter.

This was the last Monte-Carlo Masters tournament to have a best-of-five title match.

== Seeds ==
1. (Switzerland) Roger Federer (final)
2. (Spain) Rafael Nadal (champion)
3. (Argentina) David Nalbandian (third round)
4. (Croatia) Ivan Ljubičić (quarterfinals)
5. (Russia) Nikolay Davydenko (first round)
6. (Argentina) Guillermo Coria (quarterfinals)
7. (Argentina) Gastón Gaudio (semifinals)
8. (Spain) David Ferrer (quarterfinals)
9. (Germany) Nicolas Kiefer (third round)
10. (Czech Republic) Radek Štěpánek (second round)
11. (Spain) Juan Carlos Ferrero (third round)
12. (Chile) Fernando González (semifinals)
13. (France) Sébastien Grosjean (second round, retired because of a back injury)
14. (Finland) Jarkko Nieminen (first round)
15. (Spain) Tommy Robredo (quarterfinals)
16. (Czech Republic) Tomáš Berdych (second round)

== Draw ==
=== Key ===
- Q = Qualifier
- WC = Wild card
- LL = Lucky loser
- Alt = Alternate
- ITF = ITF entry
- PR = Protected ranking
- SR = Special ranking
- SE = Special exempt
- JE = Junior exempt
- JR = Junior Accelerator Programme entrant
- CO = College Accelerator Programme entrant
- NG = Next Gen Accelerator Program entrant
- w/o = Walkover
- r = Retired
- d = Defaulted

=== Finals ===
Quarterfinals
1	(Switzerland) Roger Federer	6	6
8	(Spain) David Ferrer	1	3
4	(Croatia) Ivan Ljubičić	5	1
12	(Chile) Fernando González	7	6
7	(Argentina) Gastón Gaudio	6	6
15	(Spain) Tommy Robredo	1	3
6	(Argentina) Guillermo Coria	2	1
2	(Spain) Rafael Nadal	6	6

Semifinals
1	(Switzerland) Roger Federer	6	6
12	(Chile) Fernando González	2	4
7	(Argentina) Gastón Gaudio	7	1	1
2	(Spain) Rafael Nadal	5	6	6

Final
1	(Switzerland) Roger Federer	2	7^{7}	3	6^{5}
2	(Spain) Rafael Nadal	6	6^{2}	6	7^{7}

=== Top half ===
==== Section 1 ====
First round
1	(Switzerland) R Federer	6	2	6
Q	(Serbia and Montenegro) N Djokovic	3	6	3
(Croatia) I Karlović	4	6^{3}
(Spain) A Martín	6	7^{7}
(Belgium) C Rochus	3	3
Q	(Monaco) B Balleret	6	6
(Spain) F Verdasco	6^{6}	3
13	(France) S Grosjean	7^{8}	6
11	(Spain) J C Ferrero	6	6
(Russia) D Tursunov	1	2
(Argentina) J I Chela	6	6^{5}	6
(United Kingdom) G Rusedski	4	7^{7}	1
(Slovakia) D Hrbatý	6	3	6
LL	(Italy) D Bracciali	4	6	4
(Chile) N Massú	0	6	2
8	(Spain) D Ferrer	6	4	6

Second round
1	(Switzerland) R Federer	6	6
(Spain) A Martín	0	1
Q	(Monaco) B Balleret	4	7	3
13	(France) S Grosjean	6	5	2^{r}
11	(Spain) J C Ferrero	6	6
(Argentina) J I Chela	1	2
(Slovakia) D Hrbatý	4	6	4
8	(Spain) D Ferrer	6	3	6

Third round
1	(Switzerland) R Federer	6	6
Q	(Monaco) B Balleret	3	2
11	(Spain) J C Ferrero	1	7^{7}	3
8	(Spain) D Ferrer	6	6^{5}	6

Quarterfinals
1	(Switzerland) R Federer	6	6
8	(Spain) D Ferrer	1	3

==== Section 2 ====
First round
4	(Croatia) I Ljubičić	6	4	6
(Russia) I Andreev	3	6	2
(Thailand) P Srichaphan	1	5
(France) F Serra	6	7
WC	(France) G Simon	6	6
Q	(Russia) T Gabashvili	4	2
(France) F Santoro	2	4
16	(Czech Republic) T Berdych	6	6
12	(Chile) F González	6	3	6
(Spain) C Moyà	3	6	1
(Romania) V Hănescu	4	6	6^{2}
(Spain) F López	6	4	7^{7}
Q	(France) N Mahut	6^{2}	2
Q	(Italy) P Starace	7^{7}	6
(Sweden) R Söderling	6	2	6
5	(Russia) N Davydenko	3	6	4

Second round
4	(Croatia) I Ljubičić	4	6	7
(France) F Serra	6	3	5
WC	(France) G Simon	7^{7}	6^{5}	6
16	(Czech Republic) T Berdych	6^{2}	7^{7}	4
12	(Chile) F González	6^{4}	6	7
(Spain) F López	7^{7}	2	5
Q	(Italy) P Starace	4	4
(Sweden) R Söderling	6	6

Third round
4	(Croatia) I Ljubičić	6	6
WC	(France) G Simon	3	2
12	(Chile) F González	6	3
(Sweden) R Söderling	2	1^{r}

Quarterfinals
4	(Croatia) I Ljubičić	5	1
12	(Chile) F González	7	6

=== Bottom half ===
==== Section 3 ====
First round
7	(Argentina) G Gaudio	6	6
(United Kingdom) T Henman	1	3
(Argentina) J Acasuso	6	6
(Italy) F Volandri	4	2
Q	(Italy) A di Mauro	6	6
(Switzerland) S Wawrinka	4	2
Q	(Russia) E Korolev	2	6^{5}
10	(Czech Republic) R Štěpánek	6	7^{7}
15	(Spain) T Robredo	6	6
(Peru) L Horna	3	4
(France) G Monfils	6	4	1
(Belgium) O Rochus	4	6	6
(Italy) D Sanguinetti	6	1	4
(Italy) A Seppi	2	6	6
(Belgium) X Malisse	4	4
3	(Argentina) D Nalbandian	6	6

Second round
7	(Argentina) G Gaudio	6	3	6
(Argentina) J Acasuso	3	6	4
Q	(Italy) A di Mauro	6	2	7^{7}
10	(Czech Republic) R Štěpánek	2	6	6^{4}
15	(Spain) T Robredo	7	6
(Belgium) O Rochus	5	4
(Italy) A Seppi	5	5
3	(Argentina) D Nalbandian	7	7

Third round
7	(Argentina) G Gaudio	6	6
Q	(Italy) A di Mauro	2	4
15	(Spain) T Robredo	5	6	7
3	(Argentina) D Nalbandian	7	1	5

Quarterfinals
7	(Argentina) G Gaudio	6	6
15	(Spain) T Robredo	1	3

==== Section 4 ====
First round
6	(Argentina) G Coria	6	6
(Russia) M Youzhny	3	1
(France) P-H Mathieu	6	7
(Russia) M Safin	0	5
(Serbia and Montenegro) B Pašanski	3	0
WC	(France) M Llodra	6	6
(Belarus) M Mirnyi	4	6	6^{2}
9	(Germany) N Kiefer	6	4	7^{7}
14	(Finland) J Nieminen	6	4	6^{5}
(Belgium) K Vliegen	1	6	7^{7}
Q	(Czech Republic) J Hernych	7^{11}	4	7^{7}
WC	(France) J Benneteau	6^{9}	6	6^{4}
WC	(Monaco) J-R Lisnard	4	7^{7}	7
(United Kingdom) A Murray	6	6^{5}	5
(France) A Clément	4	4
2	(Spain) R Nadal	6	6

Second round
6	(Argentina) G Coria	1	7^{8}	6
(France) P-H Mathieu	6	6^{6}	4
WC	(France) M Llodra	6^{4}	4
9	(Germany) N Kiefer	7^{7}	6
(Belgium) K Vliegen	7	6
Q	(Czech Republic) J Hernych	5	1
WC	(Monaco) J-R Lisnard	4	1
2	(Spain) R Nadal	6	6

Third round
6	(Argentina) G Coria	6^{5}	6	6
9	(Germany) N Kiefer	7^{7}	4	3
(Belgium) K Vliegen	3	3
2	(Spain) R Nadal	6	6

Quarterfinals
6	(Argentina) G Coria	2	1
2	(Spain) R Nadal	6	6

== Qualifying ==
=== Qualifying seeds ===
1. (Serbia and Montenegro) Novak Djokovic (qualified)
2. (Italy) Daniele Bracciali (qualifying competition, lucky loser)
3. (Sweden) Jonas Björkman (qualifying competition)
4. (Germany) Florian Mayer (first round)
5. (Germany) Björn Phau (first round, retired)
6. (Italy) Potito Starace (qualified)
7. (France) Nicolas Mahut (qualified)
8. (Italy) Alessio di Mauro (qualified)
9. (Czech Republic) Jan Hernych (qualified)
10. (Spain) Rubén Ramírez Hidalgo (qualifying competition)
11. (Spain) Guillermo García López (qualifying competition)
12. (Ecuador) Nicolás Lapentti (first round)
13. (Spain) Albert Portas (first round)
14. (France) Marc Gicquel (first round)
15. (Germany) Michael Berrer (first round)
16. (Netherlands) Melle van Gemerden (qualifying competition)

=== Qualifiers ===
1. (Serbia and Montenegro) Novak Djokovic
2. (Czech Republic) Jan Hernych
3. (Monaco) Benjamin Balleret
4. (Russia) Teymuraz Gabashvili
5. (Russia) Evgeny Korolev
6. (Italy) Potito Starace
7. (France) Nicolas Mahut
8. (Italy) Alessio di Mauro

=== Lucky loser ===
1. (Italy) Daniele Bracciali

=== Qualifying draw ===
==== First qualifier ====
First round
1	(Serbia and Montenegro) Novak Djokovic	6	7^{10}
Alt	(Serbia and Montenegro) Nenad Zimonjić	4	6^{8}
(Italy) Simone Bolelli	3	6	6
15	(Germany) Michael Berrer	6	2	2

Qualifying competition
1	(Serbia and Montenegro) Novak Djokovic	6	6
(Italy) Simone Bolelli	3	4

==== Second qualifier ====
First round
2	(Italy) Daniele Bracciali	6	7^{8}
(Germany) Denis Gremelmayr	4	6^{6}
(France) Thierry Ascione	4	6^{2}
9	(Czech Republic) Jan Hernych	6	7^{7}

Qualifying competition
2	(Italy) Daniele Bracciali	5	6	4
9	(Czech Republic) Jan Hernych	7	2	6

==== Third qualifier ====
First round
3	(Sweden) Jonas Björkman	4	7	6
(France) Olivier Patience	6	5	4
WC	(Monaco) Benjamin Balleret	4	7^{8}	6
13	(Spain) Albert Portas	6	6^{6}	4

Qualifying competition
3	(Sweden) Jonas Björkman	6^{5}	3
WC	(Monaco) Benjamin Balleret	7^{7}	6

==== Fourth qualifier ====
First round
4	(Germany) Florian Mayer	5	1
(Russia) Teymuraz Gabashvili	7	6
(Germany) Dominik Meffert	2	1
16	(Netherlands) Melle van Gemerden	6	6

Qualifying competition
(Russia) Teymuraz Gabashvili	7^{7}	6
16	(Netherlands) Melle van Gemerden	6^{3}	3

==== Fifth qualifier ====
First round
5	(Germany) Björn Phau	7	3	1^{r}
(Russia) Evgeny Korolev	5	6	4
WC	(France) Alexandre Sidorenko	0	2
10	(Spain) Rubén Ramírez Hidalgo	6	6

Qualifying competition
(Russia) Evgeny Korolev	7	6
10	(Spain) Rubén Ramírez Hidalgo	5	2

==== Sixth qualifier ====
First round
6	(Italy) Potito Starace	6	6
WC	(Monaco) Thomas Drouet	1	3
(Italy) Flavio Cipolla	7	6
12	(Ecuador) Nicolás Lapentti	5	3

Qualifying competition
6	(Italy) Potito Starace	6	6
(Italy) Flavio Cipolla	4	2

==== Seventh qualifier ====
First round
7	(France) Nicolas Mahut	6	4	6
WC	(Croatia) Marin Čilić	2	6	2
(Italy) Giorgio Galimberti	5	6	3
11	(Spain) Guillermo García López	7	3	6

Qualifying competition
7	(France) Nicolas Mahut	7	6
11	(Spain) Guillermo García López	5	4

==== Eighth qualifier ====
First round
8	(Italy) Alessio di Mauro	5
(France) Jean-Christophe Faurel	2^{r}
(Italy) Federico Luzzi	7^{7}	6
14	(France) Marc Gicquel	6^{3}	1

Qualifying competition
8	(Italy) Alessio di Mauro	6	4
(Italy) Federico Luzzi	1	1^{r}
