= 2013 Monte-Carlo Rolex Masters – Singles =

Singles
- 2013 Monte-Carlo Rolex Masters

Final
- Champion: (Serbia) Novak Djokovic
- Runner-up: (Spain) Rafael Nadal
- Score: 6–2, 7–6^{(7–1)}

Details
- Draw: 56 (7 Q / 3 WC )
- Seeds: 16

Events
Singles	Doubles
← 2012 ·	Monte-Carlo Rolex Masters	· 2014 →

Novak Djokovic defeated the eight-time defending champion Rafael Nadal in a rematch of the previous year's final, 6–2, 7–6^{(7–1)} to win the singles tennis title at the 2013 Monte-Carlo Masters. With the win, Djokovic ended Nadal's 46-match winning streak at the event, the longest win streak at a single tournament in tennis history. Additionally, Djokovic became the first player to win singles titles at eight of the nine Masters 1000 tournaments (he would eventually complete the Career Golden Masters at the 2018 Cincinnati Open).

== Seeds ==
The top eight seeds receive a bye into the second round.

1. (Serbia) Novak Djokovic (champion)
2. (United Kingdom) Andy Murray (third round)
3. (Spain) Rafael Nadal (final)
4. (Czech Republic) Tomáš Berdych (third round)
5. (Argentina) Juan Martín del Potro (third round)
6. (France) Jo-Wilfried Tsonga (semifinals)
7. (France) Richard Gasquet (quarterfinals)
8. (Serbia) Janko Tipsarević (second round)
9. (Croatia) Marin Čilić (third round)
10. (Spain) Nicolás Almagro (second round)
11. (France) Gilles Simon (first round)
12. (Canada) Milos Raonic (second round)
13. (Switzerland) Stan Wawrinka (quarterfinals)
14. (Argentina) Juan Mónaco (third round)
15. (Italy) Andreas Seppi (first round)
16. (Germany) Philipp Kohlschreiber (third round)

== Draw ==
Key

- Q = Qualifier
- WC = Wild card
- LL = Lucky loser
- Alt = Alternate
- ITF = ITF entry
- PR = Protected ranking
- SR = Special ranking
- SE = Special exempt
- JE = Junior exempt
- JR = Junior Accelerator Programme entrant
- CO = College Accelerator Programme entrant
- NG = Next Gen Accelerator Program entrant
- w/o = Walkover
- r = Retired
- d = Defaulted

=== Finals ===
Quarter finals
1	(Serbia) Novak Djokovic	6	6
(Finland) Jarkko Nieminen	4	3
(Italy) Fabio Fognini	7^{7}	6
7	(France) Richard Gasquet	6^{0}	2
(Bulgaria) Grigor Dimitrov	2	6	4
3	(Spain) Rafael Nadal	6	2	6
6	(France) Jo-Wilfried Tsonga	2	6	6
13	(Switzerland) Stan Wawrinka	6	3	4

Semi finals
1	(Serbia) Novak Djokovic	6	6
(Italy) Fabio Fognini	2	1
3	(Spain) Rafael Nadal	6	7^{7}
6	(France) Jo-Wilfried Tsonga	3	6^{3}

Final
1	(Serbia) Novak Djokovic	6	7^{7}
3	(Spain) Rafael Nadal	2	6^{1}

=== Top half ===
==== Section 1 ====
First round
(Russia) M Youzhny	6	6
(Spain) D Gimeno Traver	4	0
(Latvia) E Gulbis	4	6	6
WC	(United States) J Isner	6	2	3
(Slovakia) M Kližan	4	0
14	(Argentina) J Mónaco	6	6
12	(Canada) M Raonic	6	6
(France) J Benneteau	1	4
(Finland) J Nieminen	6	6
(Serbia) V Troicki	1	2
(Ukraine) A Dolgopolov	6	6
(Australia) B Tomic	2	4

Second round
1	(Serbia) N Djokovic	4	6	6
(Russia) M Youzhny	6	1	4
(Latvia) E Gulbis	0	6	3
14	(Argentina) J Mónaco	6	3	6
12	(Canada) M Raonic	3	6	6^{3}
(Finland) J Nieminen	6	1	7^{7}
(Ukraine) A Dolgopolov	6	4	3
5/WC	(Argentina) JM del Potro	1	6	6

Third round
1	(Serbia) N Djokovic	4	6	6
14	(Argentina) J Mónaco	6	2	2
(Finland) J Nieminen	6	4	7^{7}
5/WC	(Argentina) JM del Potro	4	6	6^{4}

Quarterfinals
1	(Serbia) N Djokovic	6	6
(Finland) J Nieminen	4	3

==== Section 2 ====
First round
Q	(Romania) V Hănescu	7^{10}	3	1
(Spain) M Granollers	6^{8}	6	6
Q	(Spain) A Ramos	6	6
(Czech Republic) R Štěpánek	3	3
(Italy) F Fognini	3	6	6
15	(Italy) A Seppi	6	4	4
9	(Croatia) M Čilić	6	6^{6}	6
(Argentina) H Zeballos	2	7^{8}	2
(Poland) J Janowicz	5	6^{9}
(South Africa) K Anderson	7	7^{11}
(Croatia) I Dodig	4	4
(France) B Paire	6	6

Second round
4	(Czech Republic) T Berdych	7	6
(Spain) M Granollers	5	4
Q	(Spain) A Ramos	3	5
(Italy) F Fognini	6	7
9	(Croatia) M Čilić	6	6
(South Africa) K Anderson	2	3
(France) B Paire	1	6	1
7	(France) R Gasquet	6	3	6

Third round
4	(Czech Republic) T Berdych	4	2
(Italy) F Fognini	6	6
9	(Croatia) M Čilić	5	4
7	(France) R Gasquet	7	6

Quarterfinals
(Italy) F Fognini	7^{7}	6
7	(France) R Gasquet	6^{0}	2

=== Bottom half ===
==== Section 3 ====
First round
(Belgium) X Malisse	3	2
(Bulgaria) G Dimitrov	6	6
WC	(Monaco) B Balleret	7	1	2
(Germany) F Mayer	5	6	6
(Spain) R Bautista Agut	6	7^{8}
11	(France) G Simon	3	6^{6}
16	(Germany) P Kohlschreiber	6	6
(Brazil) T Bellucci	4	2
Q	(Spain) P Andújar	6^{4}	7	6
(France) J Chardy	7^{7}	5	2
(Australia) M Matosevic	7	6
(Spain) F Verdasco	5	3

Second round
8	(Serbia) J Tipsarević	6^{3}	1
(Bulgaria) G Dimitrov	7^{7}	6
(Germany) F Mayer	5	6	6
(Spain) R Bautista Agut	7	4	4
16	(Germany) P Kohlschreiber	6	2	7^{7}
Q	(Spain) P Andújar	2	6	6^{3}
(Australia) M Matosevic	1	2
3	(Spain) R Nadal	6	6

Third round
(Bulgaria) G Dimitrov	6	6
(Germany) F Mayer	2	4
16	(Germany) P Kohlschreiber	2	4
3	(Spain) R Nadal	6	6

Quarterfinals
(Bulgaria) G Dimitrov	2	6	4
3	(Spain) R Nadal	6	2	6

==== Section 4 ====
First round
Q	(Germany) D Brands	3	4
(Russia) N Davydenko	6	6
(Austria) J Melzer	1	6	6
Q	(Netherlands) J Huta Galung	6	3	2
(Belgium) D Goffin	6	1	3
10	(Spain) N Almagro	2	6	6
13	(Switzerland) S Wawrinka	6	7
(Uzbekistan) D Istomin	3	5
WC	(France) G Monfils	2	6	4
Q	(Spain) A Montañés	6	2	6
(Netherlands) R Haase	3	2
Q	(France) É Roger-Vasselin	6	6

Second round
6	(France) J-W Tsonga	7^{7}	6
(Russia) N Davydenko	6^{3}	2
(Austria) J Melzer	6	6
10	(Spain) N Almagro	4	2
13	(Switzerland) S Wawrinka	6	6
Q	(Spain) A Montañés	1	1
Q	(France) É Roger-Vasselin	1	4
2	(United Kingdom) A Murray	6	6

Third round
6	(France) J-W Tsonga	6	6
(Austria) J Melzer	3	0
13	(Switzerland) S Wawrinka	6	6
2	(United Kingdom) A Murray	1	2

Quarterfinals
6	(France) J-W Tsonga	2	6	6
13	(Switzerland) S Wawrinka	6	3	4

== Qualifying ==
=== Seeds ===
1. (Spain) Albert Ramos (qualified)
2. (Spain) Pablo Andújar (qualified)
3. (Romania) Victor Hănescu (qualified)
4. (Germany) Daniel Brands (qualified)
5. (Germany) Tobias Kamke (first round)
6. (France) Édouard Roger-Vasselin (qualified)
7. (Slovenia) Blaž Kavčič (qualifying competition)
8. (Japan) Go Soeda (first round)
9. (Spain) Albert Montañés (qualified)
10. (France) Guillaume Rufin (qualifying competition)
11. (Poland) Łukasz Kubot (first round)
12. (Netherlands) Thiemo de Bakker (qualifying competition)
13. (Ukraine) Sergiy Stakhovsky (qualifying competition)
14. (Germany) Philipp Petzschner (qualifying competition)

=== Qualifiers ===
1. (Spain) Albert Ramos
2. (Spain) Pablo Andújar
3. (Romania) Victor Hănescu
4. (Germany) Daniel Brands
5. (Netherlands) Jesse Huta Galung
6. (France) Édouard Roger-Vasselin
7. (Spain) Albert Montañés

=== Draw ===
==== First qualifier ====
First round
1	(Spain) Albert Ramos	7	5	7^{7}
WC	(France) Jonathan Eysseric	5	7	6^{3}
(Italy) Filippo Volandri	4	6	6
8	(Japan) Go Soeda	6	1	0

Qualifying competition
1	(Spain) Albert Ramos	6	6
(Italy) Filippo Volandri	2	2

==== Second qualifier ====
First round
2	(Spain) Pablo Andújar	6	6
(France) Kenny de Schepper	2	0
WC	(Monaco) Thomas Oger	3	3
10	(France) Guillaume Rufin	6	6

Qualifying competition
2	(Spain) Pablo Andújar	6	6
10	(France) Guillaume Rufin	4	4

==== Third qualifier ====
First round
3	(Romania) Victor Hănescu	6	6
(Italy) Gianluca Naso	1	2
(Germany) Matthias Bachinger	6	6
11	(Poland) Łukasz Kubot	1	1

Qualifying competition
3	(Romania) Victor Hănescu	6	6
(Germany) Matthias Bachinger	4	4

==== Fourth qualifier ====
First round
4	(Germany) Daniel Brands	6	6
(Russia) Igor Andreev	0	1
WC	(Italy) Alessandro Giannessi	1	4
12	(Netherlands) Thiemo de Bakker	6	6

Qualifying competition
4	(Germany) Daniel Brands	4	7^{7}	6
12	(Netherlands) Thiemo de Bakker	6	6^{0}	4

==== Fifth qualifier ====
First round
5	(Germany) Tobias Kamke	4	3
Alt	(Netherlands) Jesse Huta Galung	6	6
(France) Nicolas Mahut	5	0
14	(Germany) Philipp Petzschner	7	6

Qualifying competition
Alt	(Netherlands) Jesse Huta Galung	6	6
14	(Germany) Philipp Petzschner	2	3

==== Sixth qualifier ====
First round
6	(France) Édouard Roger-Vasselin	6	6
(Japan) Tatsuma Ito	4	3
(France) Florent Serra	0	3
13	(Ukraine) Sergiy Stakhovsky	6	6

Qualifying competition
6	(France) Édouard Roger-Vasselin	6	6
13	(Ukraine) Sergiy Stakhovsky	2	4

==== Seventh qualifier ====
First round
7	(Slovenia) Blaž Kavčič	6	6^{5}	6
WC	(France) Romain Arneodo	4	7^{7}	2
(Belgium) Steve Darcis	4	4
9	(Spain) Albert Montañés	6	6

Qualifying competition
7	(Slovenia) Blaž Kavčič	3	2
9	(Spain) Albert Montañés	6	6
