= 2005 Monte Carlo Masters – Singles =

Singles
- 2005 Monte Carlo Masters

Final
- Champion: (Spain) Rafael Nadal
- Runner-up: (Argentina) Guillermo Coria
- Score: 6–3, 6–1, 0–6, 7–5

Details
- Draw: 64 (8 Q / 4 WC )
- Seeds: 16

Events
Singles	Doubles
- Monte-Carlo Masters

Rafael Nadal defeated the defending champion Guillermo Coria in the final, 6–3, 6–1, 0–6, 7–5 to win the singles tennis title at the 2005 Monte Carlo Masters. It was his first Masters title, and the first of eleven titles at the Monte-Carlo Masters and first of an eventual 36 Masters titles. His first round victory against Gaël Monfils marked the beginning of a record 46 consecutive victories at the tournament; he would not lose again until the 2013 final. Nadal became the youngest Masters champion since Michael Chang at the 1990 Canadian Open.

== Seeds ==
1. (Switzerland) Roger Federer (quarterfinals)
2. (Russia) Marat Safin (third round)
3. (United Kingdom) Tim Henman (first round)
4. (Argentina) Gastón Gaudio (quarterfinals)
5. (Spain) Carlos Moyá (first round)
6. (Argentina) Guillermo Coria (final)
7. (Sweden) Joachim Johansson (first round)
8. (Croatia) Ivan Ljubičić (first round)
9. (Argentina) Guillermo Cañas (second round)
10. (Russia) Nikolay Davydenko (third round)
11. (Spain) Rafael Nadal (champion)
12. (Sweden) Thomas Johansson (first round)
13. (Croatia) Mario Ančić (second round)
14. (Slovakia) Dominik Hrbatý (first round)
15. (Czech Republic) Radek Štěpánek (second round)
16. (Czech Republic) Jiří Novák (second round)

== Draw ==
Key

- Q = Qualifier
- WC = Wild card
- LL = Lucky loser
- Alt = Alternate
- ITF = ITF entry
- PR = Protected ranking
- SR = Special ranking
- SE = Special exempt
- JE = Junior exempt
- JR = Junior Accelerator Programme entrant
- CO = College Accelerator Programme entrant
- NG = Next Gen Accelerator Program entrant
- w/o = Walkover
- r = Retired
- d = Defaulted

=== Finals ===
Quarterfinals
1	(Switzerland) Roger Federer	7^{7}	2	6^{8}
Q	(France) Richard Gasquet	6^{1}	6	7^{10}
4	(Argentina) Gastón Gaudio	3	0
11	(Spain) Rafael Nadal	6	6
6	(Argentina) Guillermo Coria	3	6	6
(Spain) David Ferrer	6	4	3
(Italy) Filippo Volandri	2	3
WC	(Spain) Juan Carlos Ferrero	6	6

Semifinals
Q	(France) Richard Gasquet	7^{8}	4	3
11	(Spain) Rafael Nadal	6^{6}	6	6
6	(Argentina) Guillermo Coria	6	7
WC	(Spain) Juan Carlos Ferrero	2	5

Final
11	(Spain) Rafael Nadal	6	6	0	7
6	(Argentina) Guillermo Coria	3	1	6	5

=== Top half ===
==== Section 1 ====
First round
1	(Switzerland) R Federer	6	6
(United Kingdom) G Rusedski	3	1
(Morocco) Y El Aynaoui	1	3
(Spain) A Montañés	6	6
(Spain) F Verdasco	4	5
(Chile) F González	6	7
(Brazil) G Kuerten	5	2
13	(Croatia) M Ančić	7	6
10	(Russia) N Davydenko	5	6	6
(Austria) J Melzer	7	1	3
(France) M Llodra	6^{5}	2
(Spain) A Costa	7^{7}	6
Q	(France) R Gasquet	6	6
Q	(Spain) G García-López	2	0
Q	(Spain) F Mantilla	2	6	6
7	(Sweden) J Johansson	6	3	2

Second round
1	(Switzerland) R Federer	6	6
(Spain) A Montañés	3	4
(Chile) F González	6	7^{7}
13	(Croatia) M Ančić	2	6^{4}
10	(Russia) N Davydenko	7^{7}	6
(Spain) A Costa	6^{2}	2
Q	(France) R Gasquet	7	6
Q	(Spain) F Mantilla	5	1

Third round
1	(Switzerland) R Federer	6	6^{3}	6
(Chile) F González	2	7^{7}	4
10	(Russia) N Davydenko	6	5	2
Q	(France) R Gasquet	4	7	6

Quarterfinals
1	(Switzerland) R Federer	7^{7}	2	6^{8}
Q	(France) R Gasquet	6^{1}	6	7^{10}

==== Section 2 ====
First round
4	(Argentina) G Gaudio	7^{7}	6
Q	(Belgium) C Rochus	6^{3}	2
(Germany) R Schüttler	2	6	1
(Germany) N Kiefer	6	2	6
Q	(Romania) V Hănescu	6	2	6
(Argentina) A Calleri	3	6	0
(United States) V Spadea	0	5
15	(Czech Republic) R Štěpánek	6	7
11	(Spain) R Nadal	6	6
WC	(France) G Monfils	3	2
(Argentina) JI Chela	2	5
(Belgium) X Malisse	6	7
(Czech Republic) T Berdych	4	7^{7}	7^{7}
(Peru) L Horna	6	6^{3}	6^{1}
(Belgium) O Rochus	6	6
8	(Croatia) I Ljubičić	2	2

Second round
4	(Argentina) G Gaudio	7	5
(Germany) N Kiefer	5	2^{r}
Q	(Romania) V Hănescu	6	2	6
15	(Czech Republic) R Štěpánek	3	6	0
11	(Spain) R Nadal	6	6
(Belgium) X Malisse	0	3
(Czech Republic) T Berdych	6^{4}	6	2
(Belgium) O Rochus	7^{7}	3	6

Third round
4	(Argentina) G Gaudio	6	6
Q	(Romania) V Hănescu	2	0
11	(Spain) R Nadal	6	6
(Belgium) O Rochus	1	2

Quarterfinals
4	(Argentina) G Gaudio	3	0
11	(Spain) R Nadal	6	6

=== Bottom half ===
==== Section 3 ====
First round
6	(Argentina) G Coria	6	7
WC	(France) P-H Mathieu	2	5
Q	(France) T Ascione	6	7
(Slovakia) K Beck	3	5
(Italy) P Starace	3	5
(Spain) A Martín	6	7
WC	(France) J-R Lisnard	4	6	6
12	(Sweden) T Johansson	6	4	2
14	(Slovakia) D Hrbatý	4	3
(Spain) D Ferrer	6	6
Q	(Italy) A Seppi	6	6
(Spain) F López	3	4
(Sweden) R Söderling	6^{3}	5
(France) F Santoro	7^{7}	7
(Argentina) M Zabaleta	6	4	6
3	(United Kingdom) T Henman	4	6	2

Second round
6	(Argentina) G Coria	6	6
Q	(France) T Ascione	2	1
(Spain) A Martín	6	6
WC	(France) J-R Lisnard	1	2
(Spain) D Ferrer	6	6
Q	(Italy) A Seppi	3	3
(France) F Santoro	7^{7}	3	4
(Argentina) M Zabaleta	6^{1}	6	6

Third round
6	(Argentina) G Coria	7^{7}	6
(Spain) A Martín	6^{0}	1
(Spain) D Ferrer	3	1
(Argentina) M Zabaleta	6	0^{r}

Quarterfinals
6	(Argentina) G Coria	3	6	6
(Spain) D Ferrer	6	4	3

==== Section 4 ====
First round
5	(Spain) C Moyá	6^{10}	6	3
(Argentina) M Puerta	7^{12}	1	6
(France) J Benneteau	3	3
(Germany) F Mayer	6	6
(Italy) F Volandri	7	6
(Australia) W Arthurs	5	2
(Russia) I Andreev	6^{10}	1
9	(Argentina) G Cañas	7^{12}	6
16	(Czech Republic) J Novák	3	6	6
(Belarus) M Mirnyi	6	4	3
WC	(Spain) JC Ferrero	6	6
(Croatia) I Karlović	4	1
(France) C Saulnier	6	6
(Thailand) P Srichaphan	2	4
(South Korea) H-t Lee	0	5
2	(Russia) M Safin	6	7

Second round
(Argentina) M Puerta	6	6
(Germany) F Mayer	2	1
(Italy) F Volandri	6	2	6
9	(Argentina) G Cañas	4	6	3
16	(Czech Republic) J Novák	6	2	3
WC	(Spain) JC Ferrero	3	6	6
(France) C Saulnier	3	1
2	(Russia) M Safin	6	6

Third round
(Argentina) M Puerta	7^{8}	6^{3}	4
(Italy) F Volandri	6^{6}	7^{7}	6
WC	(Spain) JC Ferrero	6	6
2	(Russia) M Safin	2	4

Quarterfinals
(Italy) F Volandri	2	3
WC	(Spain) JC Ferrero	6	6

== Qualifying ==
=== Qualifying seeds ===
1. (Belgium) Christophe Rochus (qualified)
2. (Argentina) José Acasuso (qualifying competition)
3. (Germany) Philipp Kohlschreiber (first round)
4. (Spain) Santiago Ventura (qualifying competition)
5. (Austria) Stefan Koubek (qualifying competition)
6. (Spain) Guillermo García López (qualified)
7. (Netherlands) Sjeng Schalken (first round)
8. (France) Jérôme Haehnel (first round)
9. (Spain) Félix Mantilla (qualified)
10. (Germany) Lars Burgsmüller (first round)
11. (Spain) Óscar Hernández (first round)
12. (Sweden) Jonas Björkman (first round)
13. (Romania) Victor Hănescu (qualified)
14. (Spain) Nicolás Almagro (qualifying competition)
15. (France) Richard Gasquet (qualified)
16. (France) Julien Benneteau (qualified)

=== Qualifiers ===
1. (Belgium) Christophe Rochus
2. (Romania) Victor Hănescu
3. (Italy) Andreas Seppi
4. (France) Julien Benneteau
5. (France) Thierry Ascione
6. (Spain) Guillermo García López
7. (France) Richard Gasquet
8. (Spain) Félix Mantilla

=== Qualifying draw ===
==== First qualifier ====
First round
1	(Belgium) Christophe Rochus	6	6
(France) Gilles Simon	2	2
(Switzerland) Marco Chiudinelli	6^{5}	6	6
12	(Sweden) Jonas Björkman	7^{7}	3	4

Qualifying competition
1	(Belgium) Christophe Rochus	6	6
(Switzerland) Marco Chiudinelli	2	2

==== Second qualifier ====
First round
2	(Argentina) José Acasuso	6	6
WC	(France) Jean-Christophe Faurel	1	4
(Czech Republic) Bohdan Ulihrach	4	7^{7}	0
13	(Romania) Victor Hănescu	6	6^{3}	6

Qualifying competition
2	(Argentina) José Acasuso	3	6	3
13	(Romania) Victor Hănescu	6	3	6

==== Third qualifier ====
First round
3	(Germany) Philipp Kohlschreiber	3	4
(Italy) Andreas Seppi	6	6
(Switzerland) Stanislas Wawrinka	6	6
10	(Germany) Lars Burgsmüller	3	4

Qualifying competition
(Italy) Andreas Seppi	3	6	6
(Switzerland) Stanislas Wawrinka	6	4	4

==== Fourth qualifier ====
First round
4	(Spain) Santiago Ventura	7^{7}	6
(Italy) Daniele Bracciali	6^{3}	2
WC	(Monaco) Benjamin Balleret	7^{7}	3	2
16	(France) Julien Benneteau	6^{4}	6	6

Qualifying competition
4	(Spain) Santiago Ventura	3	6	4
16	(France) Julien Benneteau	6	4	6

==== Fifth qualifier ====
First round
5	(Austria) Stefan Koubek	6	6
(France) Nicolas Mahut	2	3
(France) Thierry Ascione	6	6
11	(Spain) Óscar Hernández	3	4

Qualifying competition
5	(Austria) Stefan Koubek	3	3
(France) Thierry Ascione	6	6

==== Sixth qualifier ====
First round
6	(Spain) Guillermo García López	6	4	6
(France) Olivier Mutis	2	6	3
WC	(Monaco) Guillaume Couillard	0	3
14	(Spain) Nicolás Almagro	6	6

Qualifying competition
6	(Spain) Guillermo García López	6	6^{6}	6
14	(Spain) Nicolás Almagro	2	7^{8}	4

==== Seventh qualifier ====
First round
7	(Netherlands) Sjeng Schalken	6	6^{5}	6^{6}
(Australia) Peter Luczak	1	7^{7}	7^{8}
(Morocco) Hicham Arazi	3	1
15/WC	(France) Richard Gasquet	6	6

Qualifying competition
(Australia) Peter Luczak	0	2
15/WC	(France) Richard Gasquet	6	6

==== Eighth qualifier ====
First round
8	(France) Jérôme Haehnel	2	6	4
(Spain) David Sánchez	6	2	6
Alt	(France) Olivier Patience	1	3
9	(Spain) Félix Mantilla	6	6

Qualifying competition
(Spain) David Sánchez	6	3	5
9	(Spain) Félix Mantilla	3	6	7
