= 2018 Western & Southern Open – Men's singles =

Men's singles
- 2018 Western & Southern Open

Final
- Champion: (Serbia) Novak Djokovic
- Runner-up: (Switzerland) Roger Federer
- Score: 6–4, 6–4

Details
- Draw: 56 (7 Q / 4 WC )
- Seeds: 16

Events
| Singles | men | women |
| Doubles | men | women |
- Western & Southern Open

Novak Djokovic defeated Roger Federer in the final, 6–4, 6–4 to win the men's singles tennis title at the 2018 Cincinnati Masters. It was his first Cincinnati Masters title, becoming the first player to complete the career Golden Masters in singles: winning all nine ATP Masters 1000 tournaments over the course of a career.

Grigor Dimitrov was the defending champion, but lost to Djokovic in the third round.

== Seeds ==
The top eight seeds receive a bye into the second round.

1. (Spain) Rafael Nadal (withdrew)
2. (Switzerland) Roger Federer (final)
3. (Germany) Alexander Zverev (second round)
4. (Argentina) Juan Martín del Potro (quarterfinals)
5. (Bulgaria) Grigor Dimitrov (third round)
6. (South Africa) Kevin Anderson (third round)
7. (Croatia) Marin Čilić (semifinals)
8. (Austria) Dominic Thiem (withdrew)

9. (United States) John Isner (first round)
10. (Serbia) Novak Djokovic (champion)
11. (Belgium) David Goffin (semifinals, retired)
12. (Argentina) Diego Schwartzman (first round)
13. (Spain) Pablo Carreño Busta (quarterfinals)
14. (United Kingdom) Kyle Edmund (second round)
15. (Australia) Nick Kyrgios (third round)
16. (France) Lucas Pouille (second round)

Click on the seed number of a player to go to their draw section.

== Draw ==
Key

- Q = Qualifier
- WC = Wild card
- LL = Lucky loser
- Alt = Alternate
- ITF = ITF entry
- PR = Protected ranking
- SR = Special ranking
- SE = Special exempt
- JE = Junior exempt
- JR = Junior Accelerator Programme entrant
- CO = College Accelerator Programme entrant
- NG = Next Gen Accelerator Program entrant
- w/o = Walkover
- r = Retired
- d = Defaulted

=== Finals ===
Quarterfinals
(Canada) Milos Raonic | 5 | 6 | 3
10 | (Serbia) Novak Djokovic | 7 | 4 | 6
13 | (Spain) Pablo Carreño Busta | 6^{7} | 4
7 | (Croatia) Marin Čilić | 7^{9} | 6
11 | (Belgium) David Goffin | 7^{7} | 7^{7}
4 | (Argentina) Juan Martín del Potro | 6^{5} | 6^{4}
WC | (Switzerland) Stan Wawrinka | 7^{7} | 6^{6} | 2
2 | (Switzerland) Roger Federer | 6^{2} | 7^{8} | 6

Semifinals
10 | (Serbia) Novak Djokovic | 6 | 3 | 6
7 | (Croatia) Marin Čilić | 4 | 6 | 3
11 | (Belgium) David Goffin | 6^{3} | 1^{r}
2 | (Switzerland) Roger Federer | 7^{7} | 1

Final
10 | (Serbia) Novak Djokovic | 6 | 6
2 | (Switzerland) Roger Federer | 4 | 4

=== Top half ===
==== Section 1 ====
First round
Q | (Serbia) D Lajović | 3 | 3
(Canada) M Raonic | 6 | 6
WC | (United States) F Tiafoe | 6^{6} | 6 | 5
(Canada) D Shapovalov | 7^{8} | 3 | 7
WC | (United States) M McDonald | 3 | 2
14 | (United Kingdom) K Edmund | 6 | 6
10 | (Serbia) N Djokovic | 6 | 7^{7}
(United States) S Johnson | 4 | 6^{4}
(France) A Mannarino | 6^{7} | 6 | 7^{9}
(Italy) M Cecchinato | 7^{9} | 2 | 6^{7}
(Bosnia and Herzegovina) D Džumhur | 3 | 4
(Germany) M Zverev | 6 | 6

Second round
LL | (Tunisia) M Jaziri | 3 | 5
(Canada) M Raonic | 6 | 7
(Canada) D Shapovalov | 6 | 7
14 | (United Kingdom) K Edmund | 4 | 5
10 | (Serbia) N Djokovic | 4 | 6 | 6
(France) A Mannarino | 6 | 2 | 1
(Germany) M Zverev | 6^{5} | 5
5 | (Bulgaria) G Dimitrov | 7^{7} | 7

Third round
(Canada) M Raonic | 7^{8} | 6
(Canada) D Shapovalov | 6^{6} | 4
10 | (Serbia) N Djokovic | 2 | 6 | 6
5 | (Bulgaria) G Dimitrov | 6 | 3 | 4

Quarterfinals
(Canada) M Raonic | 5 | 6 | 3
10 | (Serbia) N Djokovic | 7 | 4 | 6

==== Section 2 ====
First round
(Netherlands) R Haase | 4 | 6 | 6
(Serbia) F Krajinović | 6 | 2 | 3
(Germany) M Marterer | 6^{1} | 4
Q | (United States) B Klahn | 7^{7} | 6
(France) R Gasquet | 3 | 6 | 3
13 | (Spain) P Carreño Busta | 6 | 2 | 6
9 | (United States) J Isner | 4 | 7^{7} | 6^{5}
(United States) S Querrey | 6 | 6^{5} | 7^{7}
(Russia) K Khachanov | 2 | 6 | 6
(Spain) A Ramos Viñolas | 6 | 3 | 2
(Germany) P Kohlschreiber | 4 | 2
Q | (Romania) M Copil | 6 | 6

Second round
3 | (Germany) A Zverev | 7 | 4 | 5
(Netherlands) R Haase | 5 | 6 | 7
Q | (United States) B Klahn | 4 | 4
13 | (Spain) P Carreño Busta | 6 | 6
(United States) S Querrey | 5 | 4
(Russia) K Khachanov | 7 | 6
Q | (Romania) M Copil | 7^{7} | 4 | 4
7 | (Croatia) M Čilić | 6^{4} | 6 | 6

Third round
(Netherlands) R Haase | 4 | 2
13 | (Spain) P Carreño Busta | 6 | 6
(Russia) K Khachanov | 6^{5} | 6 | 4
7 | (Croatia) M Čilić | 7^{7} | 3 | 6

Quarterfinals
13 | (Spain) P Carreño Busta | 6^{7} | 4
7 | (Croatia) M Čilić | 7^{9} | 6

=== Bottom half ===
==== Section 3 ====
First round
(France) J Chardy | 6 | 6
(Spain) F Verdasco | 1 | 2
(Spain) D Ferrer | 2 | 2
(France) B Paire | 6 | 6
(Greece) S Tsitsipas | 5 | 3
11 | (Belgium) D Goffin | 7 | 6
15 | (Australia) N Kyrgios | 6^{2} | 7 | 7^{11}
Q | (United States) D Kudla | 7^{7} | 5 | 6^{9}
(Croatia) B Ćorić | 6 | 6
Q | (Russia) D Medvedev | 2 | 3
(South Korea) H Chung | 2 | 6 | 6
(United States) J Sock | 6 | 1 | 2

Second round
6 | (South Africa) K Anderson | 7^{8} | 6
(France) J Chardy | 6^{6} | 2
(France) B Paire | 7 | 4 | 2
11 | (Belgium) D Goffin | 5 | 6 | 6
15 | (Australia) N Kyrgios | 7^{7} | 0 | 6
(Croatia) B Ćorić | 6^{1} | 6 | 3
(South Korea) H Chung | 2 | 3
4 | (Argentina) JM del Potro | 6 | 6

Third round
6 | (South Africa) K Anderson | 2 | 4
11 | (Belgium) D Goffin | 6 | 6
15 | (Australia) N Kyrgios | 6^{4} | 7^{8} | 2
4 | (Argentina) JM del Potro | 7^{7} | 6^{6} | 6

Quarterfinals
11 | (Belgium) D Goffin | 7^{7} | 7^{7}
4 | (Argentina) JM del Potro | 6^{5} | 6^{4}

==== Section 4 ====
First round
(Hungary) M Fucsovics | 4 | 6 | 7^{8}
Q | (Poland) H Hurkacz | 6 | 3 | 6^{6}
(Japan) K Nishikori | 7 | 6
(Russia) A Rublev | 5 | 3
WC | (Switzerland) S Wawrinka | 6 | 4 | 6
12 | (Argentina) D Schwartzman | 2 | 6 | 3
16 | (France) L Pouille | 6 | 1 | 6
WC | (United Kingdom) A Murray | 1 | 6 | 4
Q | (United States) M Mmoh | 4 | 6 | 4
(Argentina) L Mayer | 6 | 1 | 6
(Germany) P Gojowczyk | 2 | 6 | 7
(Portugal) J Sousa | 6 | 4 | 5

Second round
LL | (Spain) G García López | 7^{7} | 4 | 5
(Hungary) M Fucsovics | 6^{5} | 6 | 7
(Japan) K Nishikori | 4 | 4
WC | (Switzerland) S Wawrinka | 6 | 6
16 | (France) L Pouille | 6^{7} | 4
(Argentina) L Mayer | 7^{9} | 6
(Germany) P Gojowczyk | 4 | 4
2 | (Switzerland) R Federer | 6 | 6

Third round
(Hungary) M Fucsovics | 4 | 3
WC | (Switzerland) S Wawrinka | 6 | 6
(Argentina) L Mayer | 1 | 6^{6}
2 | (Switzerland) R Federer | 6 | 7^{8}

Quarterfinals
WC | (Switzerland) S Wawrinka | 7^{7} | 6^{6} | 2
2 | (Switzerland) R Federer | 6^{2} | 7^{8} | 6

== Qualifying ==
=== Seeds ===
1. (Australia) John Millman (first round, retired)
2. (United States) Ryan Harrison (first round)
3. (Tunisia) Malek Jaziri (qualifying competition, lucky loser)
4. (United States) Tennys Sandgren (first round)
5. (Serbia) Dušan Lajović (qualified)
6. (United Kingdom) Cameron Norrie (first round)
7. (Russia) Daniil Medvedev (qualified)
8. (Spain) Feliciano López (first round)
9. (Spain) Guillermo García López (qualifying competition, lucky loser)
10. (Japan) Yūichi Sugita (first round)
11. (United States) Denis Kudla (qualified)
12. (Japan) Taro Daniel (first round)
13. (Bosnia and Herzegovina) Mirza Bašić (first round)
14. (Slovakia) Jozef Kovalík (first round)

=== Qualifiers ===
1. (United States) Michael Mmoh
2. (Poland) Hubert Hurkacz
3. (United States) Denis Kudla
4. (United States) Bradley Klahn
5. (Serbia) Dušan Lajović
6. (Romania) Marius Copil
7. (Russia) Daniil Medvedev

=== Lucky loser ===
1. (Tunisia) Malek Jaziri
2. (Spain) Guillermo García López

=== Qualifying draw ===
==== First qualifier ====
First round
1 | (Australia) John Millman | 5^{r}
(United States) Tim Smyczek | 5
(United States) Michael Mmoh | 6 | 6
13 | (Bosnia and Herzegovina) Mirza Bašić | 3 | 3

Qualifying competition
(United States) Tim Smyczek | 1 | 6 | 2
(United States) Michael Mmoh | 6 | 2 | 6

==== Second qualifier ====
First round
2 | (United States) Ryan Harrison | 3 | 3
(Poland) Hubert Hurkacz | 6 | 6
(Croatia) Ivo Karlović | 7^{7} | 6
12 | (Japan) Taro Daniel | 6^{5} | 3

Qualifying competition
(Poland) Hubert Hurkacz | 7^{7} | 7^{7}
(Croatia) Ivo Karlović | 6^{3} | 6^{4}

==== Third qualifier ====
First round
3 | (Tunisia) Malek Jaziri | 6^{2} | 6 | 7^{7}
WC | (United States) Bjorn Fratangelo | 7^{7} | 3 | 6^{2}
(Russia) Evgeny Donskoy | 2 | 4
11 | (United States) Denis Kudla | 6 | 6

Qualifying competition
3 | (Tunisia) Malek Jaziri | 3 | 1
11 | (United States) Denis Kudla | 6 | 6

==== Fourth qualifier ====
First round
4 | (United States) Tennys Sandgren | 4 | 6^{1}
(United States) Bradley Klahn | 6 | 7^{7}
(Lithuania) Ričardas Berankis | 4 | 3
9 | (Spain) Guillermo García López | 6 | 6

Qualifying competition
(United States) Bradley Klahn | 7^{7} | 7^{7}
9 | (Spain) Guillermo García López | 6^{2} | 6^{1}

==== Fifth qualifier ====
First round
5 | (Serbia) Dušan Lajović | 7^{7} | 6
WC | (United States) Mitchell Krueger | 6^{3} | 4
(Cyprus) Marcos Baghdatis | 7^{7} | 6
8 | (Spain) Feliciano López | 6^{5} | 3

Qualifying competition
5 | (Serbia) Dušan Lajović | 2 | 6 | 6
(Cyprus) Marcos Baghdatis | 6 | 2 | 3

==== Sixth qualifier ====
First round
6 | (United Kingdom) Cameron Norrie | 4 | 6 | 3
(Romania) Marius Copil | 6 | 3 | 6
WC | (United States) J. J. Wolf | 7^{8} | 7^{7}
14 | (Slovakia) Jozef Kovalík | 6^{6} | 6^{5}

Qualifying competition
(Romania) Marius Copil | 6 | 7^{7}
WC | (United States) J. J. Wolf | 4 | 6^{2}

==== Seventh qualifier ====
First round
7 | (Russia) Daniil Medvedev | 2 | 7 | 6
WC | (United States) Christian Harrison | 6 | 5 | 4
PR | (Japan) Yoshihito Nishioka | 6^{1} | 6 | 6
10 | (Japan) Yūichi Sugita | 7^{7} | 3 | 3

Qualifying competition
7 | (Russia) Daniil Medvedev | 4 | 7^{7} | 6
PR | (Japan) Yoshihito Nishioka | 6 | 6^{1} | 2
