= 2015 Monte-Carlo Rolex Masters – Singles =

Singles
- 2015 Monte-Carlo Rolex Masters

Final
- Champion: (Serbia) Novak Djokovic
- Runner-up: (Czech Republic) Tomáš Berdych
- Score: 7–5, 4–6, 6–3

Details
- Draw: 56 (7 Q / 4 WC )
- Seeds: 16

Events
| Singles | Doubles |
- Monte-Carlo Rolex Masters

Novak Djokovic defeated Tomáš Berdych in the final, 7–5, 4–6, 6–3 to win the singles tennis title at the 2015 Monte-Carlo Masters. It was his second Monte-Carlo Masters title, and he became the first man to win the first three ATP Tour Masters 1000 titles of the season.

Stan Wawrinka was the defending champion, but lost in the third round to Grigor Dimitrov.

== Seeds ==
The top eight seeds receive a bye into the second round.

1. (Serbia) Novak Djokovic (champion)
2. (Switzerland) Roger Federer (third round)
3. (Spain) Rafael Nadal (semifinals)
4. (Canada) Milos Raonic (quarterfinals, retired due to a foot injury)
5. (Spain) David Ferrer (quarterfinals)
6. (Czech Republic) Tomáš Berdych (final)
7. (Switzerland) Stan Wawrinka (third round)
8. (Croatia) Marin Čilić (quarterfinals)

9. (Bulgaria) Grigor Dimitrov (quarterfinals)
10. (France) Gilles Simon (third round)
11. (France) Jo-Wilfried Tsonga (third round)
12. (Spain) Roberto Bautista Agut (third round)
13. (Latvia) Ernests Gulbis (first round)
14. (France) Gaël Monfils (semifinals)
15. (United States) John Isner (third round)
16. (Spain) Tommy Robredo (third round)

Click on the seed number of a player to go to their draw section.

== Draw ==
Key

- Q = Qualifier
- WC = Wild card
- LL = Lucky loser
- Alt = Alternate
- ITF = ITF entry
- PR = Protected ranking
- SR = Special ranking
- SE = Special exempt
- JE = Junior exempt
- JR = Junior Accelerator Programme entrant
- CO = College Accelerator Programme entrant
- NG = Next Gen Accelerator Program entrant
- w/o = Walkover
- r = Retired
- d = Defaulted

=== Finals ===
Quarterfinals
1 | (Serbia) Novak Djokovic | 6 | 6
8 | (Croatia) Marin Čilić | 0 | 3
3 | (Spain) Rafael Nadal | 6 | 5 | 6
5 | (Spain) David Ferrer | 4 | 7 | 2
6 | (Czech Republic) Tomáš Berdych | 5
4 | (Canada) Milos Raonic | 2^{r}
9 | (Bulgaria) Grigor Dimitrov | 1 | 3
14/WC | (France) Gaël Monfils | 6 | 6

Semifinals
1 | (Serbia) Novak Djokovic | 6 | 6
3 | (Spain) Rafael Nadal | 3 | 3
6 | (Czech Republic) Tomáš Berdych | 6 | 6
14/WC | (France) Gaël Monfils | 1 | 4

Final
1 | (Serbia) Novak Djokovic | 7 | 4 | 6
6 | (Czech Republic) Tomáš Berdych | 5 | 6 | 3

=== Top half ===
==== Section 1 ====
First round
LL | (Netherlands) R Haase | 1 | 1
Q | (Spain) A Ramos Viñolas | 6 | 6
(Australia) B Tomic | 4 | 6 | 6
(Czech Republic) L Rosol | 6 | 2 | 3
(Austria) A Haider-Maurer | 6 | 6
13 | (Latvia) E Gulbis | 1 | 0
11 | (France) J-W Tsonga | 6 | 6
LL | (Germany) J-L Struff | 4 | 4
Q | (Slovakia) N Gombos | 1 | 4
(Belgium) D Goffin | 6 | 6
WC | (Russia) M Youzhny | 6^{8} | 4
PR | (Germany) F Mayer | 7^{10} | 6

Second round
1 | (Serbia) N Djokovic | 6 | 6
Q | (Spain) A Ramos Viñolas | 1 | 4
(Australia) B Tomic | 7^{7} | 6^{5} | 4
(Austria) A Haider-Maurer | 6^{4} | 7^{7} | 6
11 | (France) J-W Tsonga | 6 | 6
(Belgium) D Goffin | 3 | 4
PR | (Germany) F Mayer | 3 | 6 | 3
8 | (Croatia) M Čilić | 6 | 3 | 6

Third round
1 | (Serbia) N Djokovic | 6 | 6
(Austria) A Haider-Maurer | 4 | 0
11 | (France) J-W Tsonga | 3 | 6^{5}
8 | (Croatia) M Čilić | 6 | 7^{7}

Quarterfinals
1 | (Serbia) N Djokovic | 6 | 6
8 | (Croatia) M Čilić | 0 | 3

==== Section 2 ====
First round
(Austria) D Thiem | 4 | 4
WC | (France) L Pouille | 6 | 6
(Serbia) V Troicki | 7^{7} | 5 | 6
(Slovakia) M Kližan | 6^{5} | 7 | 2
(United States) S Johnson | 4 | 4
15 | (United States) J Isner | 6 | 6
10 | (France) G Simon | 6 | 6
WC | (Monaco) B Balleret | 4 | 2
Q | (United States) D Kudla | 3 | 6^{3}
Q | (France) B Paire | 6 | 7^{7}
(Dominican Republic) V Estrella Burgos | 6 | 7^{7}
(Italy) S Bolelli | 4 | 6^{5}

Second round
3 | (Spain) R Nadal | 6 | 6
WC | (France) L Pouille | 2 | 1
(Serbia) V Troicki | 6^{4} | 6^{5}
15 | (United States) J Isner | 7^{7} | 7^{7}
10 | (France) G Simon | 6 | 7
Q | (France) B Paire | 4 | 5
(Dominican Republic) V Estrella Burgos | 2 | 0^{r}
5 | (Spain) D Ferrer | 6 | 2

Third round
3 | (Spain) R Nadal | 7^{8} | 4 | 6
15 | (United States) J Isner | 6^{6} | 6 | 3
10 | (France) G Simon | 2 | 7^{7} | 1
5 | (Spain) D Ferrer | 6 | 6^{3} | 6

Quarterfinals
3 | (Spain) R Nadal | 6 | 5 | 6
5 | (Spain) D Ferrer | 4 | 7 | 2

=== Bottom half ===
==== Section 3 ====
First round
(Spain) P Carreño Busta | 6^{3} | 6 | 4
(Ukraine) S Stakhovsky | 7^{7} | 4 | 6
(Germany) P Kohlschreiber | 6 | 6
(Kazakhstan) M Kukushkin | 4 | 4
(Germany) B Becker | 0 | 2
12 | (Spain) R Bautista Agut | 6 | 6
16 | (Spain) T Robredo | 6 | 1 | 6
(Italy) A Seppi | 3 | 6 | 4
(Spain) M Granollers | 6 | 6
(France) A Mannarino | 3 | 0
(Portugal) J Sousa | 6 | 3 | 6
Q | (France) É Roger-Vasselin | 1 | 6 | 0

Second round
6 | (Czech Republic) T Berdych | 6 | 7^{7}
(Ukraine) S Stakhovsky | 4 | 6^{2}
(Germany) P Kohlschreiber | 7^{7} | 3 | 6^{4}
12 | (Spain) R Bautista Agut | 6^{3} | 6 | 7^{7}
16 | (Spain) T Robredo | 6 | 6
(Spain) M Granollers | 1 | 1
(Portugal) J Sousa | 3 | 6^{4}
4 | (Canada) M Raonic | 6 | 7^{7}

Third round
6 | (Czech Republic) T Berdych | 7^{9} | 6
12 | (Spain) R Bautista Agut | 6^{7} | 4
16 | (Spain) T Robredo | 3 | 6 | 3
4 | (Canada) M Raonic | 6 | 3 | 6

Quarterfinals
6 | (Czech Republic) T Berdych | 5
4 | (Canada) M Raonic | 2^{r}

==== Section 4 ====
First round
(Czech Republic) J Veselý | 4 | 2
(Argentina) J Mónaco | 6 | 6
(Italy) F Fognini | 6 | 6
(Poland) J Janowicz | 3 | 1
(Spain) F Verdasco | 4 | 6 | 4
9 | (Bulgaria) G Dimitrov | 6 | 4 | 6
14/WC | (France) G Monfils | 4 | 6 | 6
Q | (Russia) A Kuznetsov | 6 | 3 | 4
(Croatia) B Ćorić | 5 | 7 | 2
(Ukraine) A Dolgopolov | 7 | 5 | 6
(France) J Chardy | 7 | 6
Q | (Argentina) D Schwartzman | 5 | 2

Second round
7 | (Switzerland) S Wawrinka | 6 | 6
(Argentina) J Mónaco | 1 | 4
(Italy) F Fognini | 3 | 4
9 | (Bulgaria) G Dimitrov | 6 | 6
14/WC | (France) G Monfils | 7^{7} | 7^{8}
(Ukraine) A Dolgopolov | 6^{5} | 6^{6}
(France) J Chardy | 2 | 1
2 | (Switzerland) R Federer | 6 | 6

Third round
7 | (Switzerland) S Wawrinka | 1 | 2
9 | (Bulgaria) G Dimitrov | 6 | 6
14/WC | (France) G Monfils | 6 | 7^{7}
2 | (Switzerland) R Federer | 4 | 6^{5}

Quarterfinals
9 | (Bulgaria) G Dimitrov | 1 | 3
14/WC | (France) G Monfils | 6 | 6

== Qualifying ==
=== Seeds ===
1. (Argentina) Diego Schwartzman (qualified)
2. (Argentina) Carlos Berlocq (first round, retired)
3. (Uzbekistan) Denis Istomin (qualifying competition, retired)
4. (Spain) Albert Ramos Viñolas (qualified)
5. (Finland) Jarkko Nieminen (first round)
6. (Germany) Jan-Lennard Struff (qualifying competition, lucky loser)
7. (France) Benoît Paire (qualified)
8. (Netherlands) Robin Haase (qualifying competition, lucky loser)
9. (Tunisia) Malek Jaziri (first round)
10. (Russia) Andrey Kuznetsov (qualified)
11. (Slovenia) Blaž Rola (first round)
12. (Spain) Albert Montañés (qualifying competition)
13. (Kazakhstan) Andrey Golubev (first round)
14. (Italy) Luca Vanni (first round)

=== Qualifiers ===
1. (Argentina) Diego Schwartzman
2. (United States) Denis Kudla
3. (Slovakia) Norbert Gombos
4. (Spain) Albert Ramos Viñolas
5. (Russia) Andrey Kuznetsov
6. (France) Édouard Roger-Vasselin
7. (France) Benoît Paire

=== Lucky losers ===
1. (Netherlands) Robin Haase
2. (Germany) Jan-Lennard Struff

=== Qualifying draw ===
==== First qualifier ====
First round
1 | (Argentina) Diego Schwartzman | 6 | 6
WC | (Monaco) Romain Arneodo | 4 | 4
WC | (Monaco) Lucas Catarina | 1 | 3
12 | (Spain) Albert Montañés | 6 | 6

Qualifying competition
1 | (Argentina) Diego Schwartzman | 6 | 6
12 | (Spain) Albert Montañés | 4 | 4

==== Second qualifier ====
First round
2 | (Argentina) Carlos Berlocq | 6 | 3^{r}
(Sweden) Elias Ymer | 4 | 2
(United States) Denis Kudla | 3 | 6 | 7
13 | (Kazakhstan) Andrey Golubev | 6 | 3 | 5

Qualifying competition
(Sweden) Elias Ymer | 4 | 0
(United States) Denis Kudla | 6 | 6

==== Third qualifier ====
First round
3 | (Uzbekistan) Denis Istomin | 6 | 6
(Italy) Roberto Marcora | 0 | 1
(Slovakia) Norbert Gombos | 6 | 6
9 | (Tunisia) Malek Jaziri | 3 | 3

Qualifying competition
3 | (Uzbekistan) Denis Istomin | 3^{r}
(Slovakia) Norbert Gombos | 4

==== Fourth qualifier ====
First round
4 | (Spain) Albert Ramos Viñolas | 6 | 6
(France) David Guez | 4 | 2
(Estonia) Jürgen Zopp | 2 | 4
8 | (Netherlands) Robin Haase | 6 | 6

Qualifying competition
4 | (Spain) Albert Ramos Viñolas | 6 | 7
8 | (Netherlands) Robin Haase | 4 | 5

==== Fifth qualifier ====
First round
5 | (Finland) Jarkko Nieminen | 7 | 5 | 3
(France) Paul-Henri Mathieu | 5 | 7 | 6
WC | (Italy) Filippo Volandri | 2 | 7^{7} | 1
10 | (Russia) Andrey Kuznetsov | 6 | 6^{2} | 6

Qualifying competition
(France) Paul-Henri Mathieu | 6^{4} | 1
10 | (Russia) Andrey Kuznetsov | 7^{7} | 6

==== Sixth qualifier ====
First round
6 | (Germany) Jan-Lennard Struff | 6 | 6
WC | (France) Hugo Nys | 0 | 4
(France) Édouard Roger-Vasselin | 6 | 6
11 | (Slovenia) Blaž Rola | 3 | 1

Qualifying competition
6 | (Germany) Jan-Lennard Struff | 4 | 6 | 6^{6}
(France) Édouard Roger-Vasselin | 6 | 4 | 7^{8}

==== Seventh qualifier ====
First round
7 | (France) Benoît Paire | 6 | 7^{8}
(Belgium) Niels Desein | 4 | 6^{6}
(Netherlands) Thiemo de Bakker | 7 | 0 | 6
14 | (Italy) Luca Vanni | 5 | 6 | 4

Qualifying competition
7 | (France) Benoît Paire | 6 | 6
(Netherlands) Thiemo de Bakker | 1 | 2
