= 2008 Masters Series Monte-Carlo – Singles =

Singles
- 2008 Masters Series Monte-Carlo

Final
- Champion: (Spain) Rafael Nadal
- Runner-up: (Switzerland) Roger Federer
- Score: 7–5, 7–5

Details
- Draw: 56 (7 Q / 4 WC )
- Seeds: 16

Events
Singles	Doubles
- Monte-Carlo Masters

Three-time defending champion Rafael Nadal defeated Roger Federer in a rematch of the previous two years' finals, 7–5, 7–5 to win the singles tennis title at the 2008 Monte-Carlo Masters. For the second consecutive year, Nadal did not lose a set during the tournament.

== Seeds ==
The top eight seeds receive a bye into the second round.

1. (Switzerland) Roger Federer (final)
2. (Spain) Rafael Nadal (champion)
3. (Serbia) Novak Djokovic (semifinals, retired due to a sore throat)
4. (Russia) Nikolay Davydenko (semifinals)
5. (Spain) David Ferrer (quarterfinals)
6. (Argentina) David Nalbandian (quarterfinals)
7. (France) Richard Gasquet (third round)
8. (Russia) Mikhail Youzhny (second round, retired due to a neck injury)
9. (France) Paul-Henri Mathieu (first round)
10. (Spain) Carlos Moyá (first round)
11. (Argentina) Juan Mónaco (second round, retired due to a hand injury)
12. (Spain) Tommy Robredo (third round)
13. (Spain) Juan Carlos Ferrero (third round)
14. (United Kingdom) Andy Murray (third round)
15. (Croatia) Ivo Karlović (second round)
16. (Germany) Philipp Kohlschreiber (third round)

== Draw ==
Key

- Q = Qualifier
- WC = Wild card
- LL = Lucky loser
- Alt = Alternate
- ITF = ITF entry
- PR = Protected ranking
- SR = Special ranking
- SE = Special exempt
- JE = Junior exempt
- JR = Junior Accelerator Programme entrant
- CO = College Accelerator Programme entrant
- NG = Next Gen Accelerator Program entrant
- w/o = Walkover
- r = Retired
- d = Defaulted

=== Finals ===
Quarterfinals
1	(Switzerland) Roger Federer	5	6	6
6	(Argentina) David Nalbandian	7	2	2
3	(Serbia) Novak Djokovic	6	6
(United States) Sam Querrey	4	0
(Russia) Igor Andreev	3	6	5
4	(Russia) Nikolay Davydenko	6	4	7
5	(Spain) David Ferrer	1	5
2	(Spain) Rafael Nadal	6	7

Semifinals
1	(Switzerland) Roger Federer	6	3
3	(Serbia) Novak Djokovic	3	2^{r}
4	(Russia) Nikolay Davydenko	3	2
2	(Spain) Rafael Nadal	6	6

Final
1	(Switzerland) Roger Federer	5	5
2	(Spain) Rafael Nadal	7	7

=== Top half ===
==== Section 1 ====
First round
Q	(Spain) R Ramírez Hidalgo	6	6
(France) G Simon	1	1
(France) G Monfils	7	6
(Spain) F Verdasco	5	4
(France) S Grosjean	6	4	1^{r}
15	(Croatia) I Karlović	4	6	4
12	(Spain) T Robredo	6	7
(Switzerland) S Wawrinka	4	5
(Czech Republic) R Štěpánek	4	7^{8}	3
(Sweden) R Söderling	6	6^{6}	6
(Germany) T Haas	1	0^{r}
Q	(Belgium) O Rochus	6	3

Second round
1	(Switzerland) R Federer	6	3	7^{7}
Q	(Spain) R Ramírez Hidalgo	1	6	6^{1}
(France) G Monfils	7^{10}	6
15	(Croatia) I Karlović	6^{8}	1
12	(Spain) T Robredo	6	7^{7}
(Sweden) R Söderling	4	6^{3}
Q	(Belgium) O Rochus	4	3
6	(Argentina) D Nalbandian	6	6

Third round
1	(Switzerland) R Federer	6	6
(France) G Monfils	3	4
12	(Spain) T Robredo	1	0
6	(Argentina) D Nalbandian	6	6

Quarterfinals
1	(Switzerland) R Federer	5	6	6
6	(Argentina) D Nalbandian	7	2	2

==== Section 2 ====
First round
WC	(Brazil) G Kuerten	1	2
(Croatia) I Ljubičić	6	6
(France) N Mahut	2	3
(Italy) F Volandri	6	6
(Spain) F López	6^{5}	4
14	(United Kingdom) A Murray	7^{7}	6
10	(Spain) C Moyá	3	6	3
(United States) S Querrey	6	1	6
(Argentina) A Calleri	4	3
(Italy) A Seppi	6	6
(France) F Santoro	6^{4}	1
Q	(Belgium) K Vliegen	7^{7}	6

Second round
3	(Serbia) N Djokovic	6	6
(Croatia) I Ljubičić	3	3
(Italy) F Volandri	4	1
14	(United Kingdom) A Murray	6	6
(United States) S Querrey	6	7
(Italy) A Seppi	1	5
Q	(Belgium) K Vliegen	1	2
7	(France) R Gasquet	6	6

Third round
3	(Serbia) N Djokovic	6	6
14	(United Kingdom) A Murray	0	4
(United States) S Querrey	2	6	6
7	(France) R Gasquet	6	4	3

Quarterfinals
3	(Serbia) N Djokovic	6	6
(United States) S Querrey	4	0

=== Bottom half ===
==== Section 3 ====
First round
(Russia) I Andreev	7	6
(Russia) D Tursunov	5	3
(Spain) N Almagro	6	6
WC	(Monaco) J-R Lisnard	4	4
(South Korea) H-t Lee	0	5
11	(Argentina) J Mónaco	6	7
16	(Germany) P Kohlschreiber	7^{7}	6
(Argentina) J Acasuso	6^{4}	3
(Croatia) M Čilić	6	6^{4}	3
(Germany) N Kiefer	3	7^{7}	6
(Argentina) JI Chela	2	2
Q	(Italy) S Bolelli	6	6

Second round
8	(Russia) M Youzhny	3	r
(Russia) I Andreev	6
(Spain) N Almagro	6	3
11	(Argentina) J Mónaco	2	0^{r}
16	(Germany) P Kohlschreiber	6	6
(Germany) N Kiefer	2	4
Q	(Italy) S Bolelli	2	6^{5}
4	(Russia) N Davydenko	6	7^{7}

Third round
(Russia) I Andreev	7	4	6
(Spain) N Almagro	5	6	4
16	(Germany) P Kohlschreiber	6	5	2
4	(Russia) N Davydenko	3	7	6

Quarterfinals
(Russia) I Andreev	3	6	5
4	(Russia) N Davydenko	6	4	7

==== Section 4 ====
First round
WC	(Russia) M Safin	6	6
(Belgium) X Malisse	3	2
Q	(Ecuador) N Lapentti	7^{7}	6^{2}	6
(Italy) P Starace	6^{3}	7^{7}	4
(Serbia) J Tipsarević	6	2	6
9	(France) P-H Mathieu	4	6	3
13	(Spain) JC Ferrero	6^{7}	6	6
(France) M Llodra	7^{9}	1	1
(Finland) J Nieminen	6	6
Q	(France) M Gicquel	0	4
Q	(Czech Republic) I Minář	3	4
WC	(Croatia) M Ančić	6	6

Second round
5	(Spain) D Ferrer	6	6
WC	(Russia) M Safin	2	3
Q	(Ecuador) N Lapentti	7	6^{5}	4
(Serbia) J Tipsarević	5	7^{7}	6
13	(Spain) JC Ferrero	6	6
(Finland) J Nieminen	3	3
WC	(Croatia) M Ančić	0	3
2	(Spain) R Nadal	6	6

Third round
5	(Spain) D Ferrer	6	6
(Serbia) J Tipsarević	4	0
13	(Spain) JC Ferrero	4	1
2	(Spain) R Nadal	6	6

Quarterfinals
5	(Spain) D Ferrer	1	5
2	(Spain) R Nadal	6	7

== Qualifying ==
=== Qualifying seeds ===
1. (France) Marc Gicquel (qualified)
2. (France) Julien Benneteau (qualifying competition)
3. (Sweden) Jonas Björkman (first round)
4. (Sweden) ~~Thomas Johansson~~ (withdrew)
5. (Spain) Albert Montañés (qualifying competition)
6. (Italy) Simone Bolelli (qualified)
7. (Spain) Guillermo García López (qualifying competition)
8. (France) Arnaud Clément (first round)
9. (Belgium) Kristof Vliegen (qualified)
10. (Czech Republic) Ivo Minář (qualified)
11. (Germany) Mischa Zverev (first round)
12. (Belgium) Olivier Rochus (qualified)
13. (Argentina) Juan Martín del Potro (qualifying competition)
14. (France) Thierry Ascione (first round)

=== Qualifiers ===
1. (France) Marc Gicquel
2. (Czech Republic) Ivo Minář
3. (Ecuador) Nicolás Lapentti
4. (Spain) Rubén Ramírez Hidalgo
5. (Belgium) Olivier Rochus
6. (Italy) Simone Bolelli
7. (Belgium) Kristof Vliegen

=== Qualifying draw ===
==== First qualifier ====
First round
1	(France) Marc Gicquel	6	6
WC	(Slovakia) Dominik Hrbatý	4	0
(Croatia) Roko Karanušić	3	2
13	(Argentina) Juan Martín del Potro	6	6

Qualifying competition
1	(France) Marc Gicquel	6	6
13	(Argentina) Juan Martín del Potro	4	4

==== Second qualifier ====
First round
2	(France) Julien Benneteau	6	6
WC	(France) David Guez	2	1
(France) Édouard Roger-Vasselin	1	0^{r}
10	(Czech Republic) Ivo Minář	6	2

Qualifying competition
2	(France) Julien Benneteau	4	3
10	(Czech Republic) Ivo Minář	6	6

==== Third qualifier ====
First round
3	(Sweden) Jonas Björkman	2	5
(Ecuador) Nicolás Lapentti	6	7
(Italy) Flavio Cipolla	3	6	6
8	(France) Arnaud Clément	6	3	0

Qualifying competition
(Ecuador) Nicolás Lapentti	6	6
(Italy) Flavio Cipolla	4	3

==== Fourth qualifier ====
First round
Alt	(Russia) Andrey Golubev	2	6	2
WC	(Monaco) Benjamin Balleret	6	3	6
(Spain) Rubén Ramírez Hidalgo	7^{8}	6
11	(Germany) Mischa Zverev	6^{6}	3

Qualifying competition
WC	(Monaco) Benjamin Balleret	4	2
(Spain) Rubén Ramírez Hidalgo	6	6

==== Fifth qualifier ====
First round
5	(Spain) Albert Montañés	6	6
(Russia) Teymuraz Gabashvili	3	0
(Germany) Florian Mayer	6	6^{5}	1^{r}
12	(Belgium) Olivier Rochus	3	7^{7}	2

Qualifying competition
5	(Spain) Albert Montañés	6	6^{1}	1
12	(Belgium) Olivier Rochus	3	7^{7}	6

==== Sixth qualifier ====
First round
6	(Italy) Simone Bolelli	6	3	6
(Kazakhstan) Yuri Schukin	2	6	1
WC	(France) Laurent Recouderc	6	4	6
14	(France) Thierry Ascione	4	6	2

Qualifying competition
6	(Italy) Simone Bolelli	6	6
WC	(France) Laurent Recouderc	3	2

==== Seventh qualifier ====
First round
7	(Spain) Guillermo García López	7	6
(France) Olivier Patience	5	4
(Serbia) Boris Pašanski	6^{5}	5
9	(Belgium) Kristof Vliegen	7^{7}	7

Qualifying competition
7	(Spain) Guillermo García López	5	4
9	(Belgium) Kristof Vliegen	7	6
