= 2007 Monte Carlo Masters – Singles =

Singles
- 2007 Monte Carlo Masters

Final
- Champion: (Spain) Rafael Nadal
- Runner-up: (Switzerland) Roger Federer
- Score: 6–4, 6–4

Details
- Draw: 56 (7Q / 4WC)
- Seeds: 16

Events
Singles	Doubles
- Monte Carlo Masters

Two-time defending champion Rafael Nadal defeated Roger Federer in a rematch of the previous year's final, 6–4, 6–4 to win the singles tennis title at the 2007 Monte Carlo Masters. He did not lose a single set in the entire tournament.

== Seeds ==
The top eight seeds received a bye into the second round.

1. (Switzerland) Roger Federer (final)
2. (Spain) Rafael Nadal (champion)
3. (Russia) Nikolay Davydenko (second round)
4. (Chile) Fernando González (second round)
5. (Spain) Tommy Robredo (third round)
6. (Serbia) Novak Djokovic (third round)
7. (Croatia) Ivan Ljubičić (third round)
8. (United Kingdom) ~~Andy Murray~~ (withdrew because of a back injury)
9. (Argentina) David Nalbandian (second round, retired because of a back injury)
10. (Czech Republic) Tomáš Berdych (semifinals)
11. (France) Richard Gasquet (quarterfinals)
12. (Spain) David Ferrer (quarterfinals)
13. (Russia) Mikhail Youzhny (second round)
14. (Cyprus) Marcos Baghdatis (first round)
15. (Finland) Jarkko Nieminen (first round)
16. (Spain) Juan Carlos Ferrero (semifinals)

== Draw ==
Key

- Q = Qualifier
- WC = Wild card
- LL = Lucky loser
- Alt = Alternate
- ITF = ITF entry
- PR = Protected ranking
- SR = Special ranking
- SE = Special exempt
- JE = Junior exempt
- JR = Junior Accelerator Programme entrant
- CO = College Accelerator Programme entrant
- NG = Next Gen Accelerator Program entrant
- w/o = Walkover
- r = Retired
- d = Defaulted

=== Finals ===
Quarterfinals
1	(Switzerland) Roger Federer	6	6
12	(Spain) David Ferrer	4	0
16	(Spain) Juan Carlos Ferrero	5	7	6
11	(France) Richard Gasquet	7	5	2
10	(Czech Republic) Tomáš Berdych	5	6	6
(Sweden) Robin Söderling	7	3	0
Q	(Germany) Philipp Kohlschreiber	2	3
2	(Spain) Rafael Nadal	6	6

Semifinals
1	(Switzerland) Roger Federer	6	6
16	(Spain) Juan Carlos Ferrero	3	4
10	(Czech Republic) Tomáš Berdych	0	5
2	(Spain) Rafael Nadal	6	7

Final
1	(Switzerland) Roger Federer	4	4
2	(Spain) Rafael Nadal	6	6

=== Section 1 ===
First round
Q	(Russia) T Gabashvili	1	3
Q	(Italy) A Seppi	6	6
(South Korea) H-T Lee	7^{8}	6
(Sweden) J Björkman	6^{6}	1
(Spain) C Moyà	2	1^{r}
13	(Russia) M Youzhny	6	3
12	(Spain) D Ferrer	6	6
(France) G Simon	3	1
WC	(Monaco) B Balleret	5	7	2
(France) J Benneteau	7	5	6
(Russia) D Tursunov	7	2	2
(Argentina) G Gaudio	5	6	6

Second round
1	(Switzerland) R Federer	7^{7}	7^{8}
Q	(Italy) A Seppi	6^{4}	6^{6}
(South Korea) H-T Lee	6	6
13	(Russia) M Youzhny	4	3
12	(Spain) D Ferrer	6	7
(France) J Benneteau	1	5
(Argentina) G Gaudio	1	6	1
6	(Serbia) N Djokovic	6	3	6

Third round
1	(Switzerland) R Federer	6	6
(South Korea) H-T Lee	4	3
12	(Spain) D Ferrer	7	6
6	(Serbia) N Djokovic	5	4

Quarterfinals
1	(Switzerland) R Federer	6	6
12	(Spain) D Ferrer	4	0

=== Section 2 ===
First round
PR	(Russia) I Andreev	6	6
(Argentina) J Acasuso	4	1
(Chile) N Massú	4	7	6
(Italy) F Volandri	6	5	3
(United Kingdom) T Henman	5	2
16	(Spain) J C Ferrero	7	6
11	(France) R Gasquet	7	6^{12}	7^{7}
(Spain) F Verdasco	5	7^{14}	6^{3}
Q	(Spain) A Portas	6^{3}	5
(Slovakia) D Hrbatý	7^{7}	7
(France) G Monfils	0	0^{r}
(Czech Republic) R Štěpánek	6	2

Second round
4	(Chile) F González	2	6	3
PR	(Russia) I Andreev	6	2	6
(Chile) N Massú	2	0
16	(Spain) J C Ferrero	6	6
11	(France) R Gasquet	6	6
(Slovakia) D Hrbatý	3	2
(Czech Republic) R Štěpánek	6^{6}	6^{5}
7	(Croatia) I Ljubičić	7^{8}	7^{7}

Third round
PR	(Russia) I Andreev	3	3
16	(Spain) J C Ferrero	6	6
11	(France) R Gasquet	6	6^{5}	7
7	(Croatia) I Ljubičić	3	7^{7}	5

Quarterfinals
16	(Spain) J C Ferrero	5	7	6
11	(France) R Gasquet	7	5	2

=== Section 3 ===
First round
(France) A Clément	6	7^{7}
WC	(France) F Serra	4	6^{5}
(Germany) B Becker	7^{7}	6
WC	(Sweden) T Johansson	6^{4}	2
(Spain) N Almagro	0^{r}
10	(Czech Republic) T Berdych	5
14	(Cyprus) M Baghdatis	5	4
(Belarus) M Mirnyi	7	6
Q	(Argentina) S Roitman	3	6	6
(Austria) J Melzer	6	1	4
(Belgium) O Rochus	4	4
(Sweden) R Söderling	6	6

Second round
5	(Spain) T Robredo	6	6
(France) A Clément	3	2
(Germany) B Becker	1	2
10	(Czech Republic) T Berdych	6	6
(Belarus) M Mirnyi	7	6
Q	(Argentina) S Roitman	5	4
(Sweden) R Söderling	6	6^{6}	6
3	(Russia) N Davydenko	4	7^{8}	3

Third round
5	(Spain) T Robredo	6	3	2
10	(Czech Republic) T Berdych	1	6	6
(Belarus) M Mirnyi	6^{5}	2
(Sweden) R Söderling	7^{7}	6

Quarterfinals
10	(Czech Republic) T Berdych	5	6	6
(Sweden) R Söderling	7	3	0

=== Section 4 ===
First round
(France) M Gicquel	7	5	7
(Germany) F Mayer	5	7	5
Q	(Germany) P Kohlschreiber	6	5	6
Q	(Romania) A Pavel	2	7	4
Q	(Italy) F Luzzi	6	2	1
9	(Argentina) D Nalbandian	3	6	6
15	(Finland) J Nieminen	7	3	2
(Russia) M Safin	5	6	6
(Belgium) K Vliegen	7	6
WC	(France) PH Mathieu	5	3
(Argentina) J I Chela	7	6
PR	(Netherlands) M Verkerk	5	2

Second round
LL	(Spain) G García López	6	1	6
(France) M Gicquel	4	6	3
Q	(Germany) P Kohlschreiber	7	4
9	(Argentina) D Nalbandian	5	1^{r}
(Russia) M Safin	6	6^{8}	4
(Belgium) K Vliegen	0	7^{10}	6
(Argentina) J I Chela	3	1
2	(Spain) R Nadal	6	6

Third round
LL	(Spain) G García López	7	6^{4}	6^{4}
Q	(Germany) P Kohlschreiber	5	7^{7}	7^{7}
(Belgium) K Vliegen	1	1
2	(Spain) R Nadal	6	6

Quarterfinals
Q	(Germany) P Kohlschreiber	2	3
2	(Spain) R Nadal	6	6
