= 2003 Tennis Masters Cup – Singles =

Singles
- 2003 Tennis Masters Cup

Final
- Champion: (Switzerland) Roger Federer
- Runner-up: (United States) Andre Agassi
- Score: 6–3, 6–0, 6–4

Details
- Draw: 8

Events
Singles	Doubles
← 2002 ·	ATP Finals	· 2004 →

Roger Federer defeated Andre Agassi in the final, 6–3, 6–0, 6–4 to win the singles tennis title at the 2003 Tennis Masters Cup. It was the first of an eventual then-record six Tour Finals titles for Federer.

Lleyton Hewitt was the reigning champion, but did not qualify this year.

== Seeds ==
A champion seed is indicated in bold text while text in italics indicates the round in which that seed was eliminated.

1. (United States) Andy Roddick (semifinals)
2. (Spain) Juan Carlos Ferrero (round robin)
3. (Switzerland) **Roger Federer (champion)**
4. (Argentina) Guillermo Coria (round robin)
5. (United States) Andre Agassi (final)
6. (Germany) Rainer Schüttler (semifinals)
7. (Spain) Carlos Moyá (round robin)
8. (Argentina) David Nalbandian (round robin)

== Alternate ==
1. (Australia) Mark Philippoussis (Did not play)

== Draw ==
=== Key ===
- Q = Qualifier
- WC = Wild card
- LL = Lucky loser
- Alt = Alternate
- SE = Special exempt
- PR = Protected ranking
- ITF = ITF entry
- JE = Junior exempt
- w/o = Walkover
- r = Retired
- d = Defaulted
- SR = Special ranking

=== Finals ===
Semifinals
6	(Germany) Rainer Schüttler	**7**	0	4
5	(United States) **Andre Agassi**	5	**6**	**6**
3	(Switzerland) **Roger Federer**	**7^{7}**	**6**
1	(United States) Andy Roddick	6^{2}	2

Final
5	(United States) Andre Agassi	3	0	4
3	(Switzerland) **Roger Federer**	**6**	**6**	**6**

=== Red group ===
		(United States) **Roddick**	(Argentina) Coria	(Germany) **Schüttler**	(Spain) Moyá	RR W–L	Set W–L	Game W–L	Standings
1	(United States) **Andy Roddick**		**6–3, 6–7^{(3–7)}, 6–3**	6–4, 6–7^{(4–7)}, 6–7^{(3–7)}	**6–2, 3–6, 6–3**	**2–1**	**5–4**	**51–42**	**2**
4	(Argentina) Guillermo Coria	3–6, 7–6^{(7–3)}, 3–6		3–6, 6–4, 2–6	**6–2, 6–3**	1–2	4–4	36–39	3
6	(Germany) **Rainer Schüttler**	**4–6, 7–6^{(7–4)}, 7–6^{(7–3)}**	**6–3, 4–6, 6–2**		5–7, 4–6	**2–1**	**4–4**	**43–42**	**1**
7	(Spain) Carlos Moyá	2–6, 6–3, 3–6	2–6, 3–6	**7–5, 6–4**		1–2	3–4	29–36	4

Standings are determined by: 1. number of wins; 2. number of matches; 3. head-to-head records in two-player ties; 4. in three-player ties, percentage of sets won, or of games won; 5. steering-committee decision.

=== Blue group ===
		(Spain) Ferrero	(Switzerland) **Federer**	(United States) **Agassi**	(Argentina) Nalbandian	RR W–L	Set W–L	Game W–L	Standings
2	(Spain) Juan Carlos Ferrero		3–6, 1–6	6–2, 3–6, 4–6	3–6, 1–6	0–3	1–6	21–38	4
3	(Switzerland) **Roger Federer**	**6–3, 6–1**		**6–7^{(3–7)}, 6–3, 7–6^{(9–7)}**	**6–3, 6–0**	**3–0**	**6–1**	**43–23**	**1**
5	(United States) **Andre Agassi**	**2–6, 6–3, 6–4**	7–6^{(7–3)}, 3–6, 6–7^{(7–9)}		**7–6^{(12–10)}, 3–6, 6–4**	**2–1**	**5–4**	**46–48**	**2**
8	(Argentina) David Nalbandian	**6–3, 6–1**	3–6, 0–6	6–7^{(10–12)}, 6–3, 4–6		1–2	3–4	31–32	3

Standings are determined by: 1. number of wins; 2. number of matches; 3. head-to-head records in two-player ties; 4. in three-player ties, percentage of sets won, or of games won; 5. steering-committee decision.

== See also ==
- ATP World Tour Finals appearances
