= 2002 Tennis Masters Cup – Singles =

Singles
- 2002 Tennis Masters Cup

Final
- Champion: (Australia) Lleyton Hewitt
- Runner-up: (Spain) Juan Carlos Ferrero
- Score: 7–5, 7–5, 2–6, 2–6, 6–4

Details
- Draw: 8

Events
Singles
← 2001 ·	ATP Finals	· 2003 →

Defending champion Lleyton Hewitt defeated Juan Carlos Ferrero in the final, 7–5, 7–5, 2–6, 2–6, 6–4 to win the singles tennis title at the 2002 Tennis Masters Cup. With the victory, Hewitt secured the year-end number 1 ranking for the second successive year, becoming one of only seven men (at the time) to achieve this feat.

Future six-time champion Roger Federer made his tournament debut; he was defeated by Hewitt in the semifinals.

== Seeds ==
1. (Australia) Lleyton Hewitt (champion)
2. (United States) Andre Agassi (round robin, withdrew due to a hip injury)
3. (Russia) Marat Safin (round robin)
4. (Spain) Juan Carlos Ferrero (final)
5. (Spain) Carlos Moyá (semifinals)
6. (Switzerland) Roger Federer (semifinals)
7. (Czech Republic) Jiří Novák (round robin)
8. (Spain) Albert Costa (round robin)

== Alternate ==
1. (Sweden) Thomas Johansson (replaced Agassi, round robin)

== Draw ==
Key

- Q = Qualifier
- WC = Wild card
- LL = Lucky loser
- Alt = Alternate
- ITF = ITF entry
- PR = Protected ranking
- SR = Special ranking
- SE = Special exempt
- JE = Junior exempt
- JR = Junior Accelerator Programme entrant
- CO = College Accelerator Programme entrant
- NG = Next Gen Accelerator Program entrant
- w/o = Walkover
- r = Retired
- d = Defaulted

=== Finals ===
Semifinals
5	(Spain) Carlos Moyá	7^{8}	4	4
4	(Spain) Juan Carlos Ferrero	6^{6}	6	6
6	(Switzerland) Roger Federer	5	7	5
1	(Australia) Lleyton Hewitt	7	5	7

Final
4	(Spain) Juan Carlos Ferrero	5	5	6	6	4
1	(Australia) Lleyton Hewitt	7	7	2	2	6

=== Red group ===
		(Australia) Hewitt	(Russia) Safin	(Spain) Moyá	(Spain) Costa	RR W–L	Set W–L	Game W–L	Standings
1	(Australia) Lleyton Hewitt		6–4, 2–6, 6–4	4–6, 5–7	6–2, 4–6, 6–3	2–1	4–4	39–38	2
3	(Russia) Marat Safin	4–6, 6–2, 4–6		4–6, 5–7	6–3, 4–6, 3–6	0–3	2–6	36–42	4
5	(Spain) Carlos Moyá	6–4, 7–5	6–4, 7–5		7–6^{(9–7)}, 3–6, 6–4	3–0	6–1	42–34	1
8	(Spain) Albert Costa	2–6, 6–4, 3–6	3–6, 6–4, 6–3	6–7^{(7–9)}, 6–3, 4–6		1–2	4–5	42–45	3

Standings are determined by: 1. number of wins; 2. number of matches; 3. in two-players-ties, head-to-head records; 4. in three-players-ties, percentage of sets won, or of games won; 5. steering-committee decision.

=== Gold group ===
		(United States) Agassi (Sweden) Johansson	(Spain) Ferrero	(Switzerland) Federer	(Czech Republic) Novák	RR W–L	Set W–L	Game W–L	Standings
2; 9	(United States) Andre Agassi (Sweden) Thomas Johansson		5–7, 6–2, 6–7^{(6–8)} (w/ Agassi)	3–6, 5–7 (w/ Johansson)	5–7, 1–6 (w/ Agassi)	0–2; 0–1	1–4; 0–2	23–29; 8–13	4; 5
4	(Spain) Juan Carlos Ferrero	7–5, 2–6, 7–6^{(8–6)} (w/ Agassi)		3–6, 4–6	7–5, 6–3	2–1	4–3	36–37	2
6	(Switzerland) Roger Federer	6–3, 7–5 (w/ Johansson)	6–3, 6–4		6–0, 4–6, 6–2	3–0	6–1	41–23	1
7	(Czech Republic) Jiří Novák	7–5, 6–1 (w/ Agassi)	5–7, 3–6	0–6, 6–4, 2–6		1–2	3–4	29–35	3

Standings are determined by: 1. number of wins; 2. number of matches; 3. in two-players-ties, head-to-head records; 4. in three-players-ties, percentage of sets won, or of games won; 5. steering-committee decision.

== See also ==
- ATP World Tour Finals appearances
