= Tweener (tennis) =

Tennis shot where a player hits the ball between his or her legs

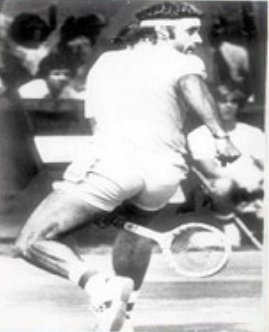
Guillermo Vilas performing the Gran Willy shot.

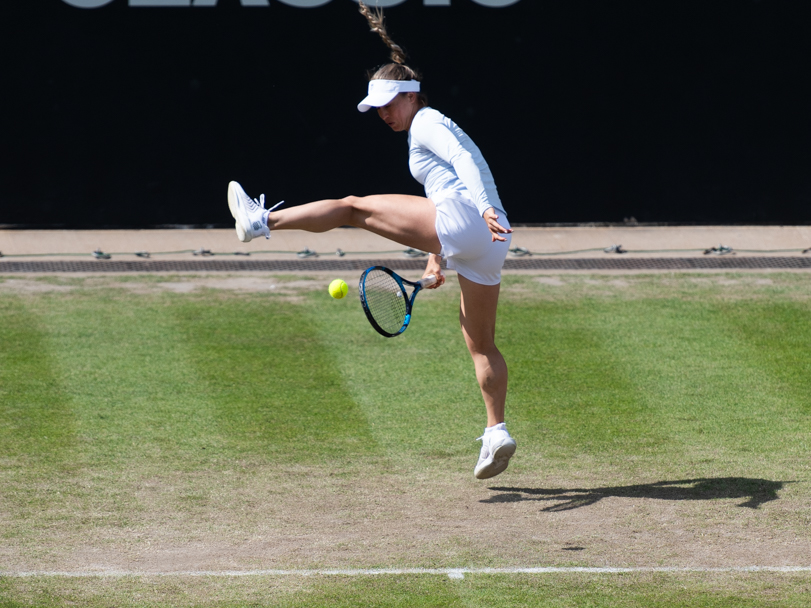
Yulia Putintseva at the 2024 Birmingham Classic

The tweener or between-the-legs shot (also known as a hotdog) is a difficult tennis shot where a player hits the ball between his or her legs. It is typically performed facing away from the opponent, when the player attempts to recover a lob and has no time to turn back around, and hits the ball backward between their legs. Forward-facing tweeners, sometimes called "front tweeners", are also occasionally employed. In competitive matches the tweener is a crowd-pleasing, seldom used last resort, but it is a common trick shot in exhibitions. Players who famously executed the backward shot include the pioneer Guillermo Vilas (whose version was called the "Gran Willy"), Yannick Noah, Ilie Năstase, Gabriela Sabatini (whose version became known as "the Sabatweenie"), Juan Carlos Ferrero, Roger Federer, Rafael Nadal, Juan Martín del Potro, Nick Kyrgios, Daria Kasatkina, Agnieszka Radwańska, Simona Halep, Ons Jabeur, and Novak Djokovic.

== History ==
The first tennis player to study and develop this shot was Argentine Guillermo Vilas. Vilas was inspired by an advertisement where Juan Carlos Harriot, a famous polo player during the '70s, hit a backwards shot between his horse's hind legs. He debuted his version in a 1974 exhibition match at the courts of Club Obras Sanitarias in Buenos Aires against the French player Wanaro N'Godrella. One year later, in 1975, he hit this shot for the very first time during an official ATP match in Indianapolis Championship against the Spaniard player Manuel Orantes; the shot became known as "Gran Willy" ("the great willy") after him. Romanian Ilie Năstase, who pioneered a backward over-the-shoulder shot known as the "Bucharest Backfire", also executed the backward tweener during the late '70s.

In the 1980s, players employing the backward tweener shot included the French player Yannick Noah, German player Boris Becker, the Swede Stefan Edberg, and Argentine Gabriela Sabatini, whose version became known as "the Sabatweenie". American Andre Agassi used it in the 1990s. In the 21st century, Swiss player Roger Federer hit tweeners on several notable occasions, further popularizing the shot. He successfully hit a backward tweener for a winner to give himself match point in the 2009 US Open semifinal, which he called "the greatest shot I ever hit in my life." Federer has also used front-facing tweeners on several occasions. Hubert Hurkacz, who defeated Federer in the quarterfinals of the 2021 Wimbledon tournament, has had his tweener described as "one of the flashiest on tour" by Christopher Clarey of The New York Times. A high jump front-facing tweener was also notably executed by Mary Pierce during the quarter-finals of the 2000 French Open.
