= 2004 Tennis Masters Cup – Singles =

Singles
- 2004 Tennis Masters Cup

Final
- Champion: (Switzerland) Roger Federer
- Runner-up: (Australia) Lleyton Hewitt
- Score: 6–3, 6–2

Details
- Draw: 8

Events
Singles	Doubles
- ATP Finals

Defending champion Roger Federer defeated Lleyton Hewitt in the final, 6–3, 6–2 to win the singles tennis title at the 2004 Tennis Masters Cup. It was his second Tour Finals title.

The final was shortened from a best-of-five-sets match to the best-of-three because of rain.

== Seeds ==
1. (Switzerland) Roger Federer (champion)
2. (United States) Andy Roddick (semifinals)
3. (Australia) Lleyton Hewitt (final)
4. (Russia) Marat Safin (semifinals)
5. (Spain) Carlos Moyá (round robin)
6. (Argentina) Guillermo Coria (round robin)
7. (United Kingdom) Tim Henman (round robin)
8. (Argentina) Gastón Gaudio (round robin)

== Alternate ==
1. (Argentina) Guillermo Cañas (Did not play)

== Draw ==
Key

- Q = Qualifier
- WC = Wild card
- LL = Lucky loser
- Alt = Alternate
- ITF = ITF entry
- PR = Protected ranking
- SR = Special ranking
- SE = Special exempt
- JE = Junior exempt
- JR = Junior Accelerator Programme entrant
- CO = College Accelerator Programme entrant
- NG = Next Gen Accelerator Program entrant
- w/o = Walkover
- r = Retired
- d = Defaulted

=== Finals ===
Semifinals
1	(Switzerland) Roger Federer	6	7^{20}
4	(Russia) Marat Safin	3	6^{18}
2	(United States) Andy Roddick	3	2
3	(Australia) Lleyton Hewitt	6	6

Final
1	(Switzerland) Roger Federer	6	6
3	(Australia) Lleyton Hewitt	3	2

=== Red group ===
		(Switzerland) Federer	(Australia) Hewitt	(Spain) Moyá	(Argentina) Gaudio	RR W–L	Set W–L	Game W–L	Standings
1	(Switzerland) Roger Federer		6–3, 6–4	6–3, 3–6, 6–3	6–1, 7–6^{(7–4)}	3–0	6–1	40–26	1
3	(Australia) Lleyton Hewitt	3–6, 4–6		6–7^{(5–7)}, 6–2, 6–4	6–2, 6–1	2–1	4–3	37–28	2
5	(Spain) Carlos Moyá	3–6, 6–3, 3–6	7–6^{(7–5)}, 2–6, 4–6		6–3, 6–4	1–2	4–4	37–40	3
8	(Argentina) Gastón Gaudio	1–6, 6–7^{(4–7)}	2–6, 1–6	3–6, 4–6		0–3	0–6	17–37	4

Standings are determined by: 1. number of wins; 2. number of matches; 3. in two-players-ties, head-to-head records; 4. in three-players-ties, percentage of sets won, or of games won; 5. steering-committee decision.

=== Blue group ===
		(United States) Roddick	(Russia) Safin	(Argentina) Coria	(United Kingdom) Henman	RR W–L	Set W–L	Game W–L	Standings
2	(United States) Andy Roddick		7–6^{(9–7)}, 7–6^{(7–4)}	7–6^{(7–4)}, 6–3	7–5, 7–6^{(8–6)}	3–0	6–0	41–32	1
4	(Russia) Marat Safin	6–7^{(7–9)}, 6–7^{(4–7)}		6–1, 6–4	6–2, 7–6^{(7–2)}	2–1	4–2	37–27	2
6	(Argentina) Guillermo Coria	6–7^{(4–7)}, 3–6	1–6, 4–6		2–6, 2–6	0–3	0–6	18–37	4
7	(United Kingdom) Tim Henman	5–7, 6–7^{(6–8)}	2–6, 6–7^{(2–7)}	6–2, 6–2		1–2	2–4	31–31	3

Standings are determined by: 1. number of wins; 2. number of matches; 3. in two-players-ties, head-to-head records; 4. in three-players-ties, percentage of sets won, or of games won; 5. steering-committee decision.

== See also ==
- ATP World Tour Finals appearances
