= 2019 Wimbledon Championships – Men's singles final =

Tennis match

Wimbledon 2019 Men's Final
- (Serbia) Novak Djokovic (1) vs. (Switzerland) Roger Federer (2)
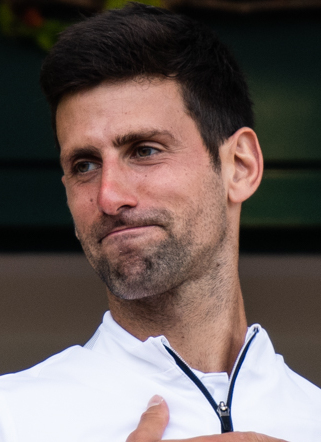
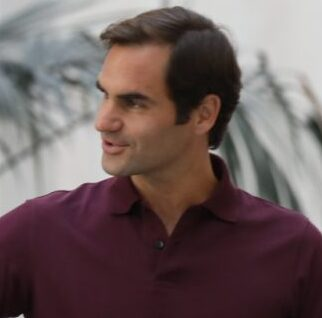
- Novak Djokovic (left) and Roger Federer (right)
Set	1	2	3	4	5
(Serbia) Novak Djokovic	7^{7}	1	7^{7}	4	13^{7}
(Switzerland) Roger Federer	6^{5}	6	6^{4}	6	12^{3}
- Date: Sunday, 14 July 2019
- Tournament: The Championships, Wimbledon
- Location: Centre Court, All England Lawn Tennis and Croquet Club, Wimbledon, London, England
- Chair umpire: Damian Steiner
- Duration: 4 hours 57 minutes

The 2019 Wimbledon Championships Men's Singles final was the championship tennis match of the men's singles tournament at the 2019 Wimbledon Championships. After 4 hours and 57 minutes, first seed Novak Djokovic defeated second seed Roger Federer in five sets to win the title in a repeat of the 2014 and the 2015 Wimbledon finals. It was the longest Wimbledon final in history, and the last major final of Federer's career. The match has been called the "War of 13–12".

== Overview ==
Novak Djokovic successfully defended his title by defeating Roger Federer in 4 hours and 57 minutes, 7–6^{(5)}, 1–6, 7–6^{(4)}, 4–6, 13–12^{(3)}, the longest singles final in Wimbledon history and the fourth longest major final in history behind the 2012 Australian Open final (which Djokovic also won), the 2022 Australian Open final and the 2025 French Open final.

Djokovic became the first man since Bob Falkenburg in the 1948 Wimbledon Championships to win the title after being championship points down, having saved two when down 7−8 in the fifth set with Federer serving. Djokovic also became the first man since Gastón Gaudio at the 2004 French Open to save championship points in order to win a Grand Slam tournament title, and the first time that any singles player, male or female, had saved a championship point to win a Grand Slam tournament title since the 2005 Wimbledon Championships. He became the second man and third singles player overall to win multiple major titles after saving match point during the tournament, after Rod Laver and Serena Williams; he had previously done so against Federer in the 2011 US Open semi-finals, after which he defeated Rafael Nadal in the final.

Federer lost the match despite statistically outplaying Djokovic in almost every category (see table below): having a better first- and second-serve percentage, more aces, fewer double-faults, more winners, more breaks of serve and a more efficient break-point conversion rate, more points won when returning serve and at a higher efficiency, and lost a higher total number of points and service games. Besides the final scoreline, the only statistical categories Djokovic won were having fewer unforced errors and all the tiebreaks that occurred.

This was the second Wimbledon match (and first in Gentlemen's Singles) in which a final set tie break rule was utilized. Upon reaching 12–all in the fifth set, a classic tie break would be played. The men's singles final was the first final, as well as the first singles match, in which the new rule came into effect, with Djokovic winning the tiebreak 7−3. This match was named the greatest men's tennis match of the 2010s by Tennis Magazine. A 2022 rule change meant that all tennis matches that are tied at six-all in the deciding set, even the Olympics, are decided by a ten-point tiebreak (instead of the usual seven-point tiebreak).

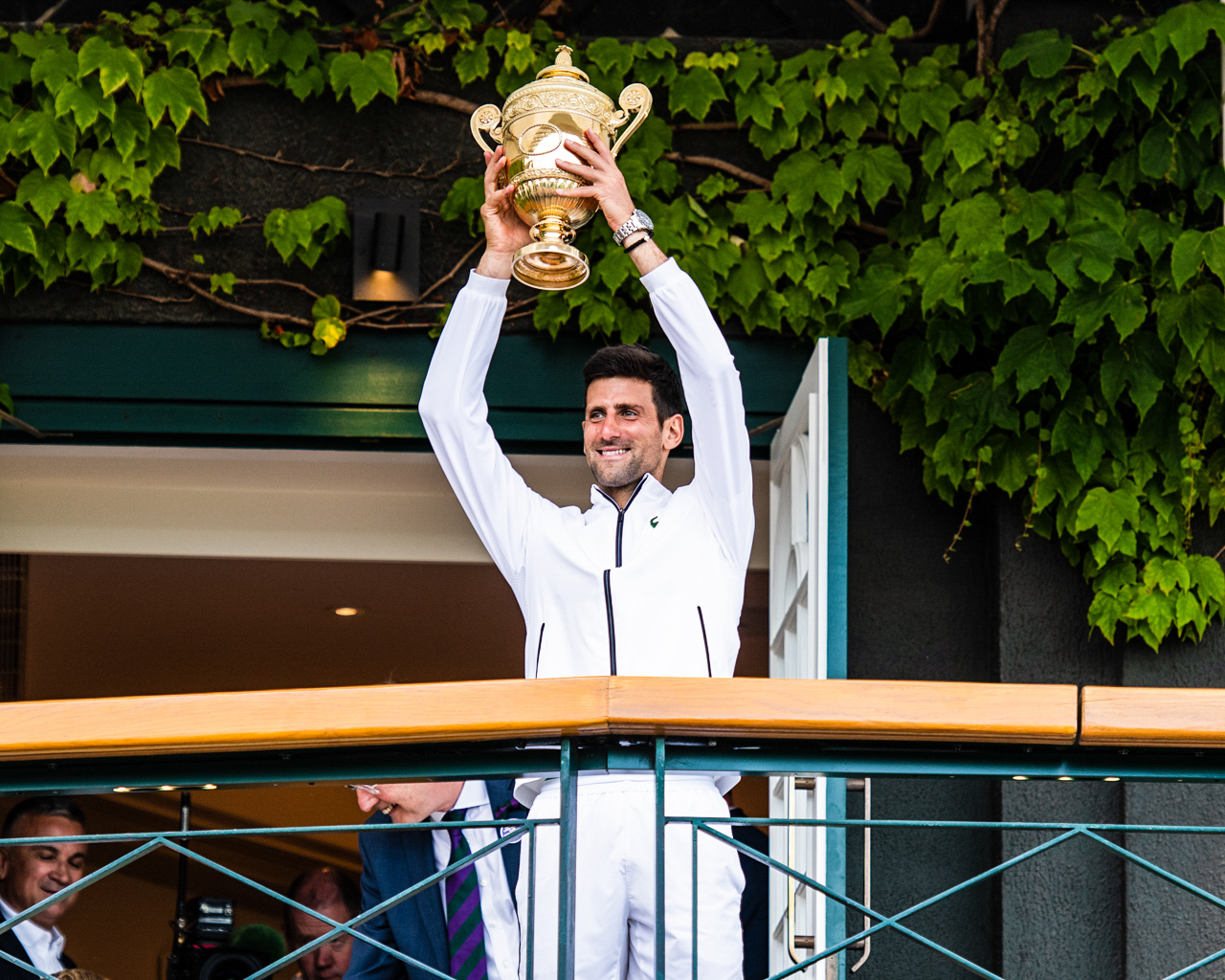
Novak Djokovic lifting the 2019 Wimbledon’s Trophy

=== Officials ===
The umpire was Damian Steiner of Argentina.

== Statistics ==
Category	Djokovic	Federer
Aces	10	25
Double faults	9	6
1st serve % in	136–83	127–76
Winning % on 1st Serve	101–35	100–27
Winning % on 2nd Serve	39–44	39–37
Net points won	24–14	51–14
Break points won	3–5	7–6
Receiving points won	64–139	79–140
Winners	54	94
Unforced errors	52	62
Winners-UFE	+2	+32
Total points won	204	218
Total games won	32	36

== See also ==
- 2019 Wimbledon Championships
- 2019 Wimbledon Championships – Men's singles
- Djokovic–Federer rivalry
