= Djokovic–Federer rivalry =

Tennis rivalry

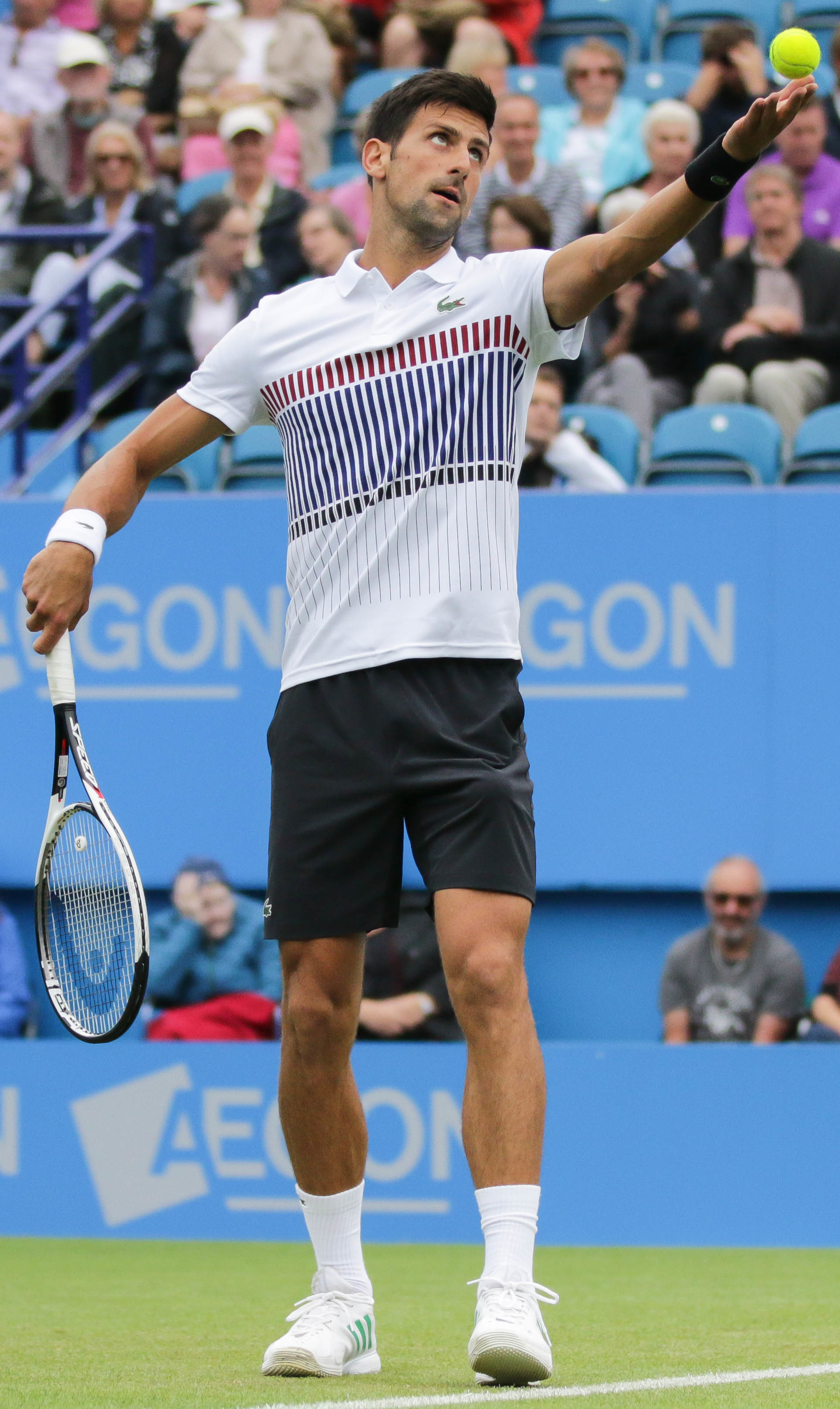
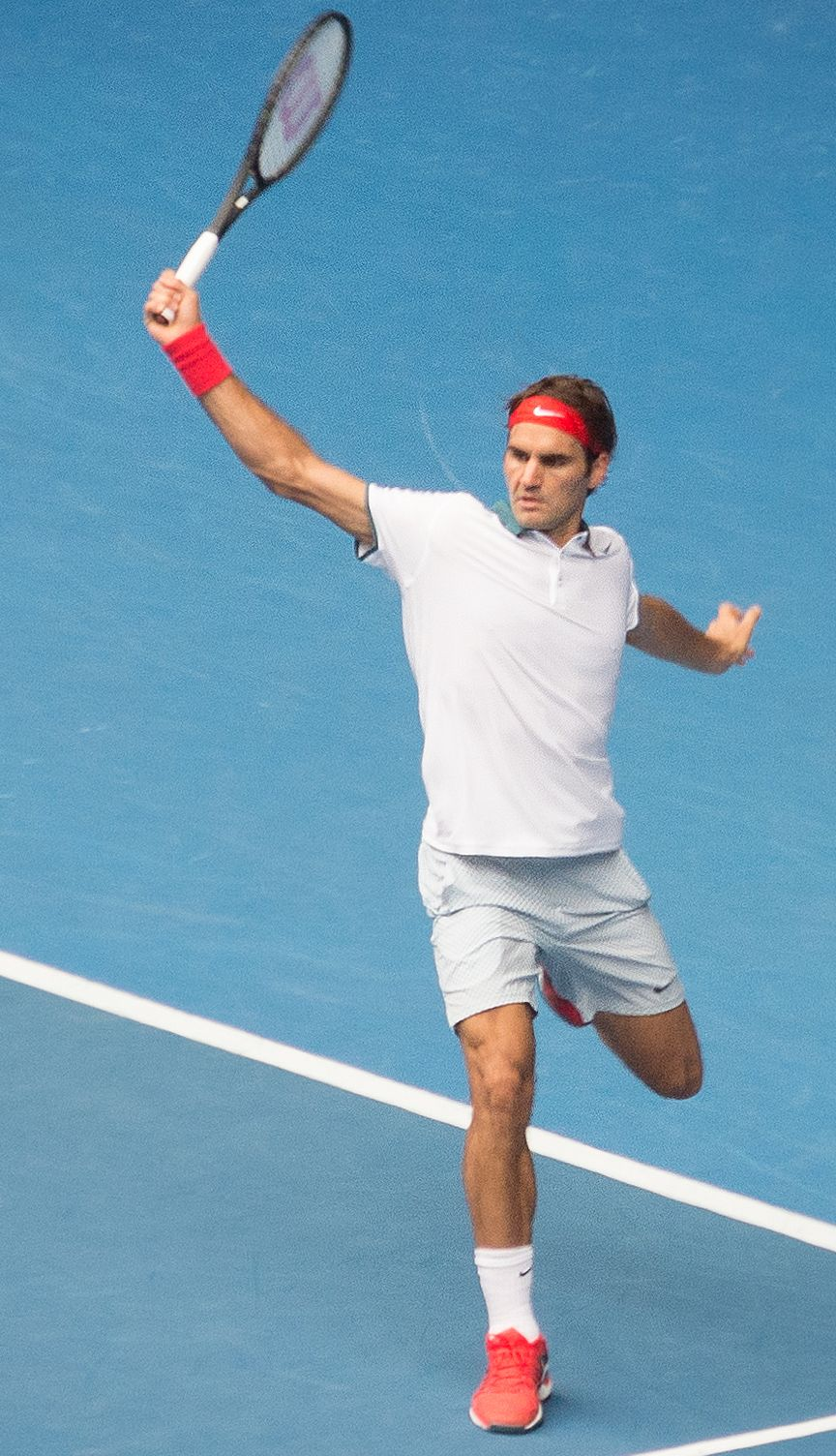
Novak Djokovic and Roger Federer

The rivalry between Novak Djokovic and Roger Federer has been described as one of the greatest in tennis history.

Djokovic and Federer faced each other 50 times, with Djokovic leading the head-to-head record 27–23, including 13–6 in finals. They played 17 matches at the majors with Djokovic leading 11–6, five which were in finals and a record eleven in the semifinals. Djokovic is the only player to defeat Federer at all four majors, and likewise Federer is the only player to defeat Djokovic at each major. Djokovic also leads their five-set matches at 4–0. In all four of their five-set matches, match points were saved in a game that was not the final game—three times by Djokovic and once by Federer. Djokovic ranks first and Federer ranks third on the men's all-time list for the most major singles titles, with 24 and 20 titles respectively. Their rival Rafael Nadal is ranked between them at second with 22 titles.

The rivalry started in 2006 with Federer winning the first four meetings, but following Djokovic's first win at the 2007 Canadian Open final, the rivalry gradually shifted in favour of Djokovic who won 27 of the next 46 matches through to its conclusion in 2020. Their matches showcased an unpredictable display of shot-making. In most rivalries, the type of playing surface generally has a profound effect on the outcome; however, this rivalry was unusually even across different surfaces and conditions. As such, Djokovic and Federer contested many acclaimed matches over the years, the most prominent being the 2019 Wimbledon final, the longest final in Wimbledon history, in which Djokovic triumphed. Other notable matches they contested are the 2014 Wimbledon and 2015 Wimbledon finals, along with semifinals at the 2010 US Open, 2011 US Open, 2011 French Open, and 2018 Paris Masters.

Their first match was at the 2006 Monte-Carlo Masters, which Federer won in three sets. Their last match was in the semifinals of the 2020 Australian Open, which Djokovic won in straight sets.

== History ==
=== Australian Open ===
Djokovic and Federer have played five times at the Australian Open, with Djokovic winning four times and Federer winning once. The first time they met at a major was in the fourth round of the 2007 Australian Open, where Federer won in straight sets. Federer went on to win without losing a set in the tournament to claim his tenth Grand Slam title. The next year, they met in a rematch at the 2008 Australian Open semifinals, where Djokovic won in straight sets to reach his second Grand Slam final. It was the first time in nearly four years that someone defeated Federer in straight sets at a Grand Slam. Djokovic proceeded to win his first career major over Tsonga in the final.

Three years later they met again in the semifinals of the 2011 Australian Open. The match was highly competitive, lasting for three hours despite being a straight sets match. Djokovic took the first set in a tight tiebreaker. In the second set, Federer held a substantial lead before Djokovic made a comeback, winning five games in a row to claim the set. Djokovic won after closing out the match in the third set. Djokovic defeated Andy Murray in the final to win his second Australian Open title. Djokovic and Federer met once again in the semifinals of the 2016 Australian Open. Djokovic easily won the first two sets but Federer rallied to win the third. Djokovic, however, broke Federer in the eighth game of the fourth set and then held to win the match and move on to the final. Djokovic again went on to defeat Murray in the final to win the tournament. Djokovic defeated Federer in straight sets in their most recent meeting in the semifinals of the 2020 Australian Open. In each of their five meetings, the winner of the match went on to win the tournament.

=== French Open ===
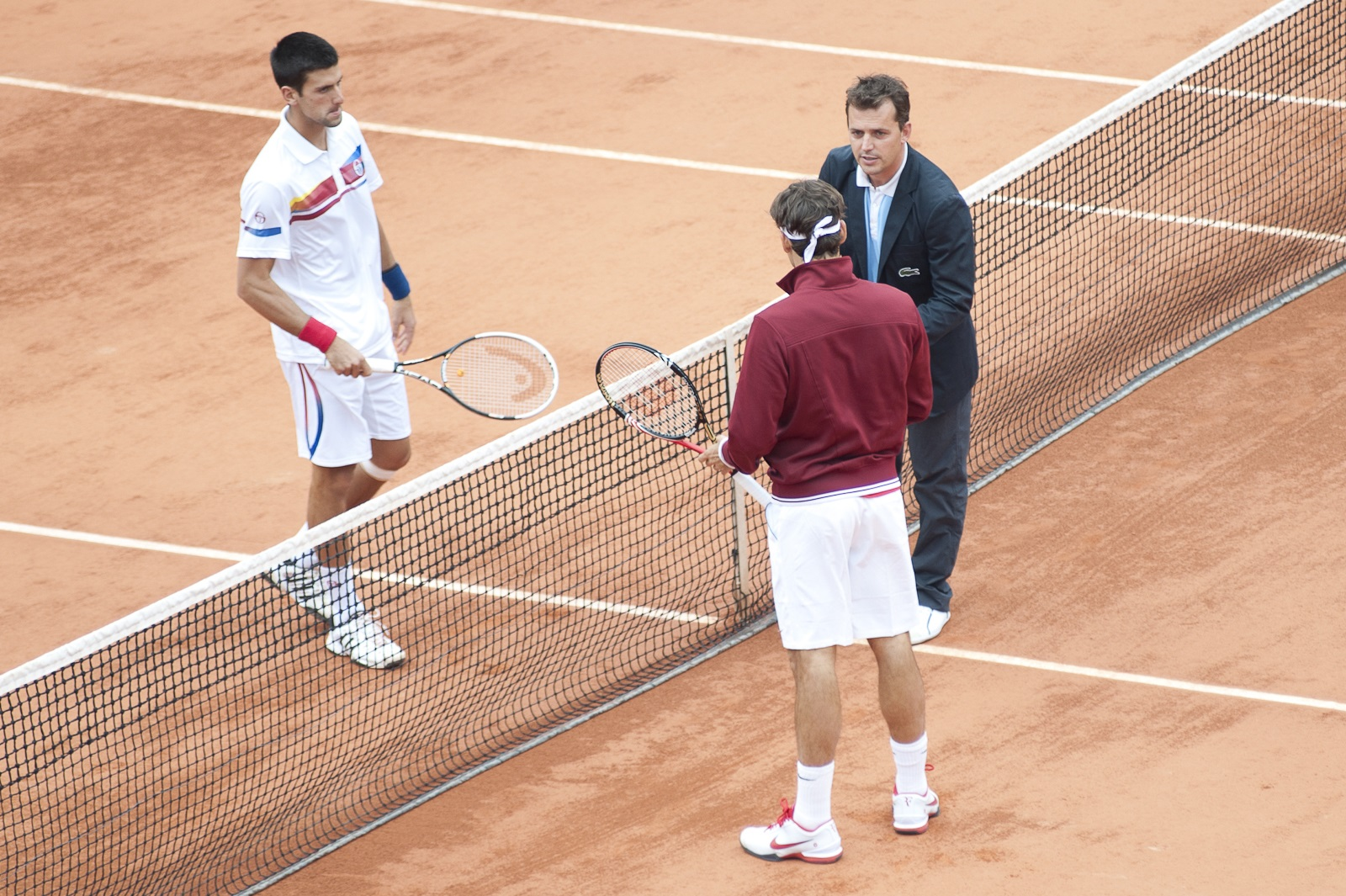
Djokovic and Federer moments before the 2011 French Open semifinal where Federer won in four sets to give Djokovic his first loss of the season.

The pair had two meetings at Roland Garros, with both occurring at the semifinal stage. The first was at the 2011 French Open. Djokovic entered the tournament with a 43-match winning streak. In the match, Federer won the opening set in a tiebreak and then claimed the second set to gain a substantial lead. Djokovic took the third set and was serving for the fourth set, but Federer came back to win it in a tiebreak closing out the match in four sets. The win ended Djokovic's winning streak as well as his 41–0 start to the 2011 season. As a result, Federer advanced to his fifth French Open final where he lost to Nadal, for the fourth time in the final and fifth time overall. Federer's win also saved John McEnroe's record of 42 consecutive match wins to start the 1984 season. The victory further elevated Federer's head-to-head record against Djokovic to 14–9 and 3–1 on clay.

In a rematch the next year, Federer and Djokovic met in the French Open semifinal which saw Djokovic prevail in straight sets and even up their clay record at 3–3. With the win, Djokovic advanced to his first French Open final, where, like Federer the previous year, he lost to Rafael Nadal in four sets.

=== Wimbledon ===
Djokovic and Federer have met four times in the Wimbledon Championships with Djokovic having 3 victories, all in finals, and Federer 1, in a semifinal. Their first meeting was in the semifinal of the 2012 Wimbledon Championships, with Federer winning in four sets to advance to his eighth Wimbledon final. With the win, Federer also became the first player to defeat Djokovic at all four of the Majors. Federer then won the final over Andy Murray to win his seventh Wimbledon title, reclaiming the world number 1 ranking from Djokovic, which enabled Federer to subsequently break Pete Sampras' record of 286 weeks of being ranked as the world number 1. In 2021 Federer's record was broken by Djokovic.

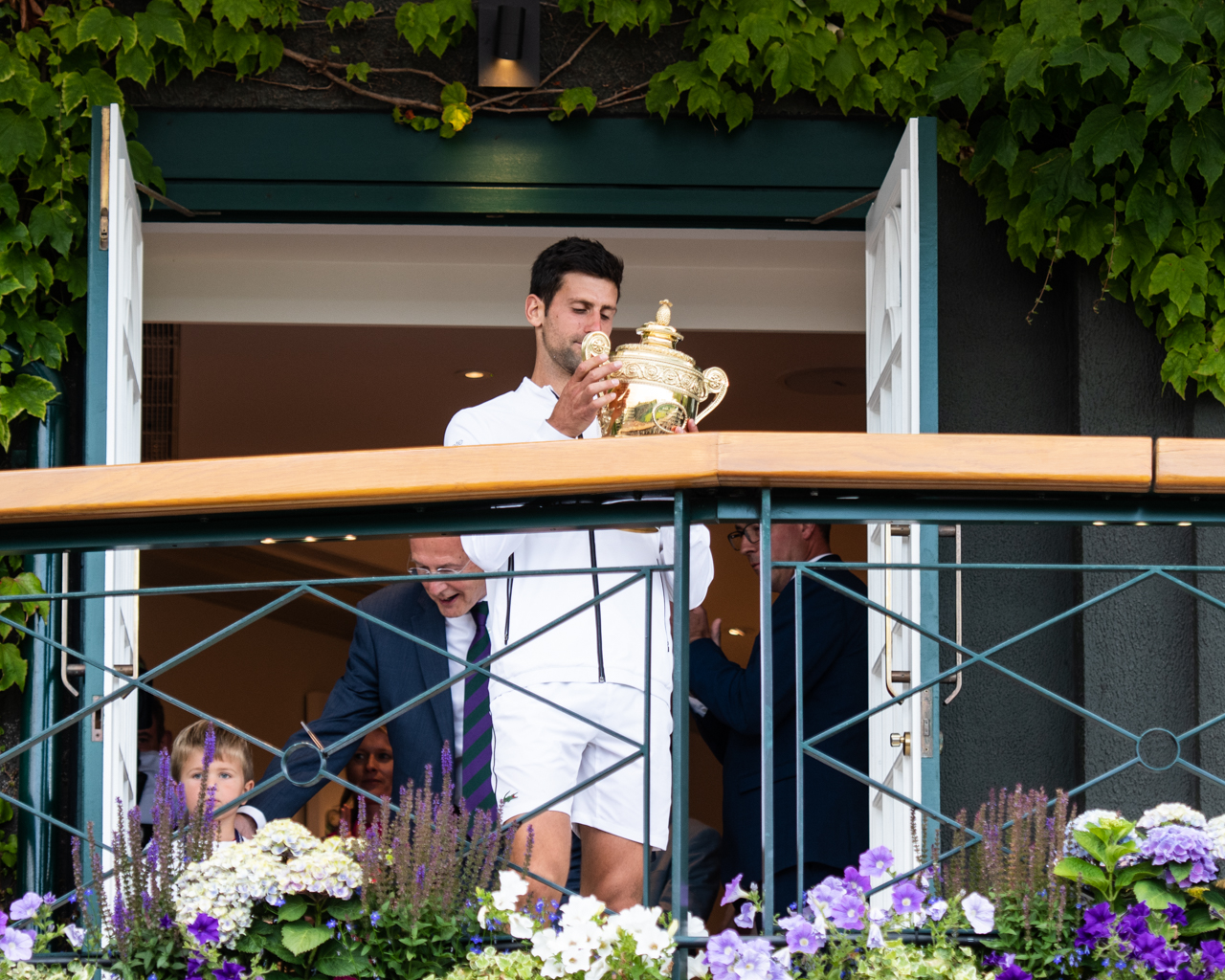
Djokovic holding the Wimbledon trophy after beating Federer in the longest final ever played at Wimbledon.

Their next meeting was in the final of the Championships in 2014, which was their second meeting in a Major final. At 3 hours and 56 minutes the match was also their longest encounter until that time. It was a close contest, with Federer winning the first set in a tiebreaker and Djokovic winning the next two, one in a tiebreaker. Federer saved a championship point in the fourth set before he came back to win the set 7–5 to force a fifth set. Djokovic took the fifth set 6–4 to win his second Wimbledon title. With the win, Djokovic prevented Federer from winning a record eight Wimbledon title, as at the time Federer and Pete Sampras jointly held the record of seven titles (Federer did eventually win his eighth in 2017). Djokovic further became the first man to defeat Federer in all four of the Grand Slams.

The two met again in the 2015 Wimbledon final with Djokovic defeating Federer once again, this time in 4 sets, two of which went to tiebreakers.

The 2019 final was their third encounter on Centre Court for the final of the Championships and their fourth match overall in this tournament. Most analysts felt Federer outplayed Djokovic for most of the match (Djokovic stated "Federer was the better player for most of the match") but due to Djokovic winning points at critical moments, namely during the first, third and fifth set tiebreakers, Djokovic was able to win the five-set match. In those three tiebreaks, Djokovic did not make any unforced errors whereas Federer made 11. In the 2-hour-and-2-minute fifth set Djokovic broke Federer's serve in the sixth game to take a 4–2 lead but Federer broke back the next game. Federer later broke Djokovic to take an 8–7 lead and with two aces held a 40–15 lead in the next game and was within one point of becoming, at 37 and 11 months, the oldest man to win a Grand Slam. However, Djokovic saved the two championship points, eventually taking the set 13–12 in the first fifth-set tiebreak in a Wimbledon match (in the first year of the new rule calling for a tiebreak at 12–12). At 4 hours and 57 minutes, the match was their longest encounter in any tournament and the longest Wimbledon final in history. The match has been described as containing "insanely gripping drama" and being both mesmerizing and "mesmerizingly strange" with Djokovic referring to his win as "unreal".

=== US Open ===
The two players have played six times at the US Open with the series tied at 3–3. Djokovic played Federer in his first Major final at the 2007 US Open. Djokovic began strongly in the final and broke Federer in the eleventh game of the first set. With Djokovic serving for the set, Federer saved five set points to come back and claim the first set in a tiebreak. Djokovic quickly gained a break lead in the second set, but was unable to serve it out as Federer came back again, saving two set points to force the set to a tiebreak which he claimed as well. In the third set, Federer was able to stay ahead on serve. He closed out the match in the tenth game by breaking Djokovic's serve to win the contest in straight sets.

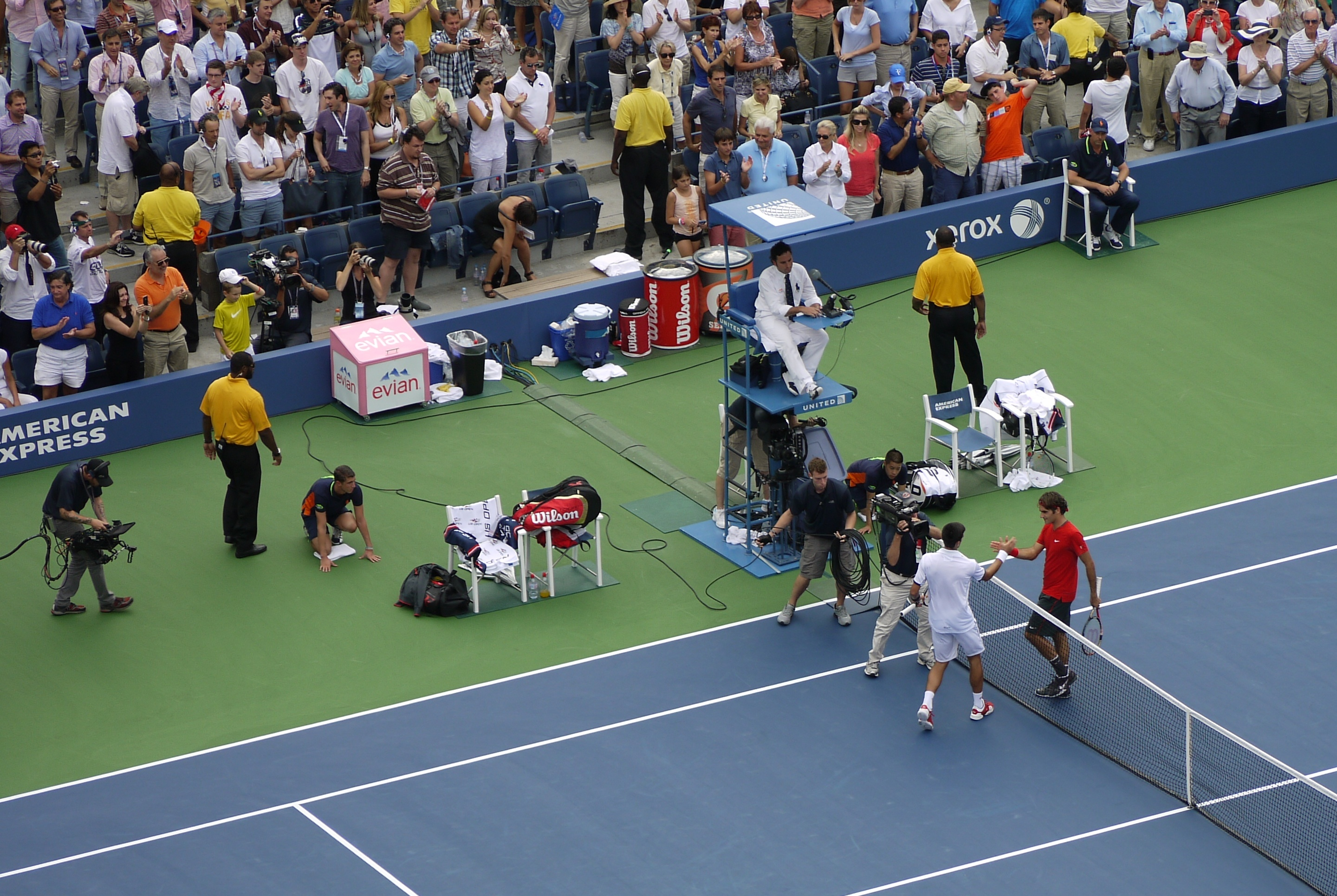
Djokovic won two consecutive US Open semifinals against Federer, saving double match points in each match.

The two subsequently played each other for five consecutive years at the US Open. After the first meeting that took place in the final, the next four meetings all occurred in the semifinals. The next year in 2008, Federer again defeated Djokovic in a four-set semifinal on his way to winning the US Open for the fifth straight time. In 2009, Federer won the semifinal match in straight sets, hitting a memorable tweener shot to set up match point. It was Federer's 40th straight win at the venue as he advanced to his sixth straight US Open final.

Their next two meetings at the tournament in 2010 and 2011 were five-set matches. Both were won by Djokovic and on both occasions he saved double match points. In the fifth set of the 2010 semifinal, Federer led 5–4 and had two match points on Djokovic's serve but Djokovic saved them hitting two forehand winners. Djokovic held, broke Federer's serve, and then held again to win the match 7–5. Djokovic was in disbelief that he'd won, putting an end to Federer's run of six straight US Open finals. "To be honest, I was just closing my eyes and hitting forehands as fast as I can on match point. If it goes in, it goes in. If it goes out, just another loss to Federer in the US Open," Djokovic stated. "It was just a couple of points that decided the match. I managed to come back. I was very lucky."

In the 2011 semifinal, Federer started the match strongly as he took the opening set in a tiebreak and won the second set comfortably. Djokovic won the next set, and claimed the fourth set as well to come back and force the match into a deciding fifth set. Federer recovered to gain a 5–3 lead and had double match points on his own serve. Djokovic saved the first match point with a memorable return winner and went on to win four games in a row to win the match once again by the same score of 7–5 in the fifth. "Sure, it's disappointing, but I have only myself to blame," said Federer. "I set it all up perfect, but I couldn't finish it. It was a tough year in terms of some tough losses at some crucial stages of the season but look, it's not the first time it's happened." Both years, Djokovic went on to play Rafael Nadal in the final, losing to him in 2010 before defeating him in 2011 to win his first US Open title.

The two later met in the final of the 2015 US Open, where Djokovic won 6–4, 5–7, 6–4, 6–4.

==== Comparison of Grand Slam titles ====
Djokovic has won 24 Grand Slam titles to Federer's 20. Djokovic has the all-time record of 14 hardcourt Grand Slam titles (Australian Open and US Open), three more than Federer. Federer has the all-time Wimbledon record of 8 titles, one more than Djokovic.

| Tournament | Djokovic | Federer |
|---|---|---|
| Australian Open | **10** | 6 |
| French Open | 3 | 1 |
| Wimbledon | 7 | **8** |
| US Open | 4 | **5** |
| **Total Count** | **24** | 20 |

- **Bold** indicates outright record.

=== ATP Masters ===
Federer and Djokovic have also met twenty times in ATP Masters tournaments, with fourteen of the meetings taking place on hardcourt and six on clay. Federer and Djokovic have met in every Masters event on hard court: Indian Wells, Miami, Montreal, Toronto, Cincinnati, Shanghai, and Paris. On clay, they've met in Monte Carlo and Rome, but have never played each other in Madrid. The majority of their matches have taken place at the semifinal stage with eleven meetings, eight of their Masters meetings have been in a final. Their first ever career meeting came in 2006 in the first round of Monte Carlo where Federer won in three sets. Next year, they played their first career and Masters final in the Canadian Open final, where Djokovic prevailed in three sets.

Djokovic has also beaten Federer three times in Rome, a tournament that Federer has never won. In addition to Rome, Federer has never won Monte Carlo but has defeated Djokovic there in 2006, 2008, and 2014.

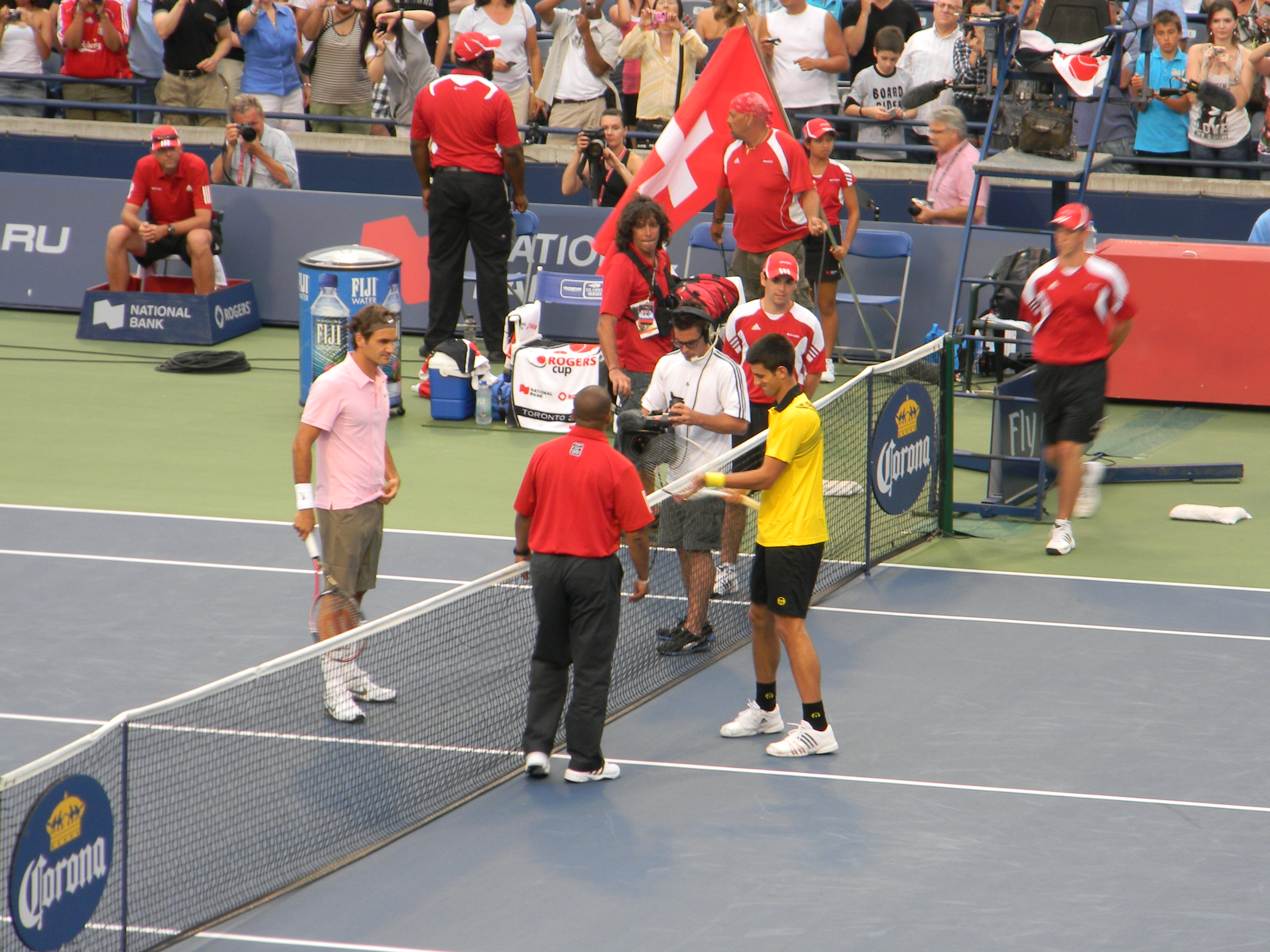
Federer and Djokovic at the Canadian Masters in 2010, moments before their encounter.

Federer and Djokovic met in the semifinals of Miami in 2009. Federer won the opening set but lost the second set. Federer fell behind 0–2 in the third set and then proceeded to smash his racquet after netting another forehand. It was the first time in seven years that Federer had destroyed a racquet. The crowd got behind Federer but Djokovic went on to win and advance to the final. The defeat prompted Federer to say in the press conference after the match "It was unfortunate but thank God the hardcourt season is over. I don't care any more. I'm moving over to clay, a new chapter." Federer again lost to Djokovic in three sets in Rome. Later in the year when the hard court season began again, they met in their first Cincinnati final where Federer defeated Djokovic in straight sets to win his third Cincinnati title.

In 2010, Federer beat Djokovic in the Toronto semifinals but went on to lose the final to Andy Murray. Later in the year, Federer beat Djokovic again in the Shanghai semifinals but lost the final to Andy Murray in similar fashion, missing his chance to win his first title in Shanghai. In 2011, Djokovic and Federer met in the semis of Indian Wells where Djokovic won in three sets and went on to win the title over Rafael Nadal. In 2012, Djokovic beat Federer in the Rome semifinals but lost the final to Nadal. They met again in the Cincinnati final where Federer beat Djokovic in straight sets to win Cincinnati for the fifth time. It was the first bagel set in the rivalry which saw Djokovic's record in Cincinnati finals fall to 0–4.

They next met again in the Paris Masters semifinals in 2013 where Djokovic beat Federer en route to winning the title over David Ferrer. In 2014, Djokovic defeated Federer again in an Indian Wells rematch, this time in the final in a third set tiebreak. Federer was down a break in the third set and made a comeback, but Djokovic hung on to win it in a tiebreaker. Later in the year Federer played a flawless match against Djokovic in the Shanghai semifinals and beat him in straight sets. Federer's win put an end to Djokovic's 28-match streak of winning matches played in China that began at the China Open in 2012 and lasted for just over two years. This time, Federer went on to win his first title in Shanghai as he defeated Gilles Simon in the final. Next year in 2015, Djokovic again defeated Federer in Indian Wells in the final. Djokovic made three double faults in the second set tiebreak, but recovered to win the third set and match. In the 2015 Italian Open final, Federer had one last chance to capture the Rome Masters but Djokovic denied him in straight sets, achieving his 4th Italian Open title and going one ahead of Federer with his 24th ATP Masters crown. Federer would get back at Djokovic in the 2015 Cincinnati final, beating him in straight sets to win his 7th Cincinnati title.

In 2018 they met again in the final at Cincinnati, with Djokovic prevailing in straight sets this time, becoming the first player to achieve the career Golden Masters – that is, winning all nine ATP Masters events, which he has done twice. Later that year, they played their longest best-of-three match in the semi-finals of Paris Masters lasting 3 hours and 2 minutes, with Djokovic prevailing in three sets decided with a 7–3 third-set tiebreak.

==== Comparison of ATP Masters titles ====
Djokovic has won a record 40 Masters titles and Federer has won 28. Djokovic and Federer sit one-two on the list of players who have won the most Masters titles on hard courts in the Open Era with Djokovic at 28 and Federer at 22. Federer and Djokovic won their first ATP Masters event in 2002 and 2007 respectively. Since then, the only ATP Masters events missed in their respective careers were: Federer: Monte-Carlo (clay) and Rome (clay); Djokovic: Hamburg (clay) and Madrid (hard indoor).

| Tournament | Djokovic | Federer |
|---|---|---|
| Indian Wells Masters | **5** | **5** |
| Miami Open | **6** | 4 |
| Monte-Carlo Masters | 2 | 0 |
| Madrid Open | 3 | 3 |
| German Open | 0 | **4** |
| Italian Open | 6 | 0 |
| Canadian Open | 4 | 2 |
| Cincinnati Masters | 3 | **7** |
| Shanghai Masters | **4** | 2 |
| Paris Masters | **7** | 1 |
| **Total Count** | **40** | 28 |

- **Bold** indicates outright record (ATP Masters).

^{A} Federer's Madrid titles; one came on indoor hardcourt in 2006, one came on red clay in 2009, and one came on blue clay in 2012. Djokovic's Madrid titles came on red clay in 2011, 2016, and 2019.

=== ATP Finals ===
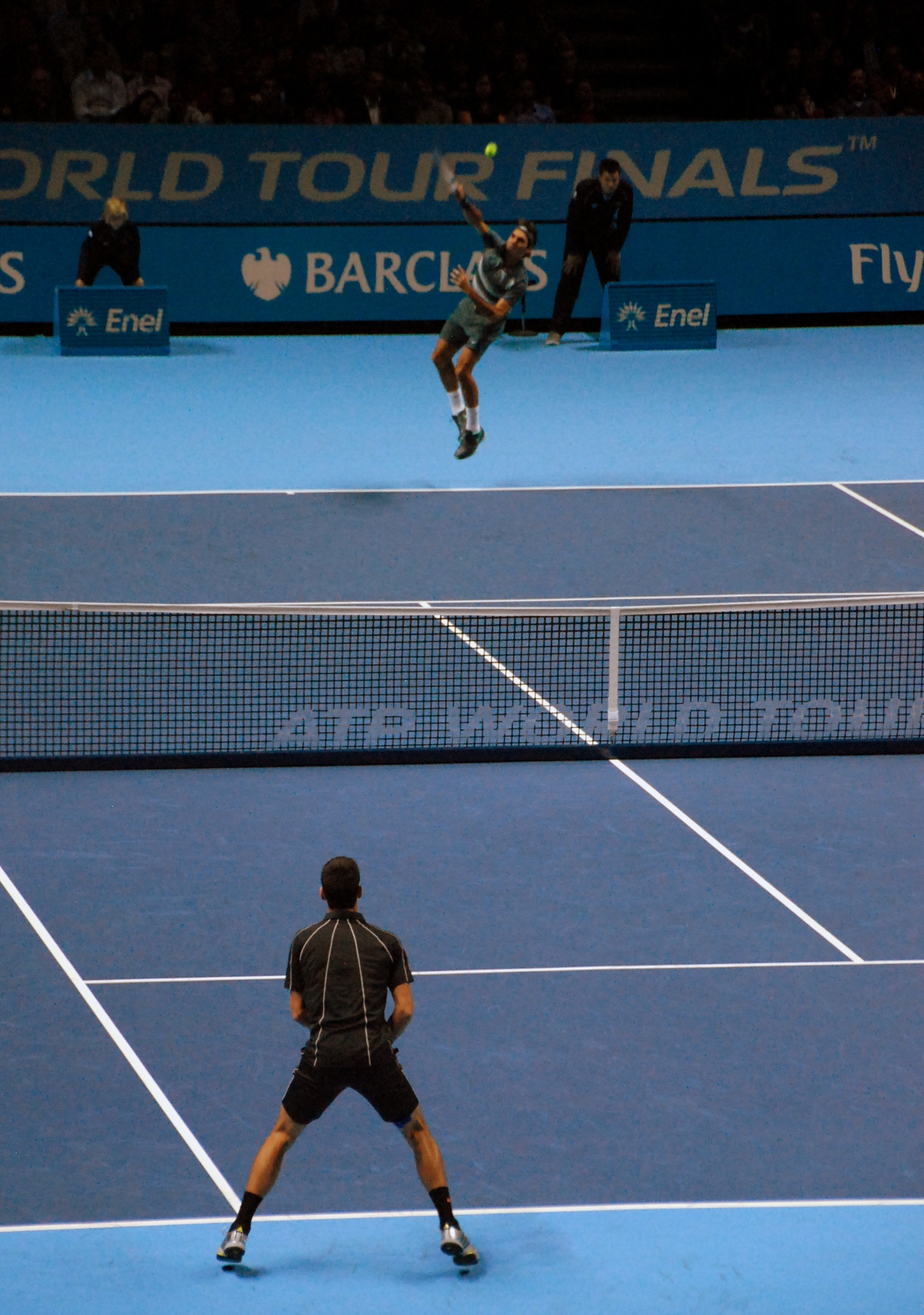
Djokovic and Federer at the 2013 ATP Finals.

The pair have met six times at the ATP Finals. Federer defeated Djokovic in the 2010 semifinals on the way to winning his fifth title at the Year-End Championship. In 2012, Federer and Djokovic were drawn into opposite groups again where Djokovic went 3–0 and Federer went 2–1. After winning their semifinal matches, they met in the final where Djokovic beat Federer in straight sets to go 5–0 and win the tournament for the second time in his career.

Since the Tennis Masters Cup in 2007, Federer and Djokovic have usually been drawn into opposing groups at every Year-end championship. The 2013 edition saw the pair drawn to play each other in the same group for the first time in their careers. Djokovic defeated Federer in the round-robin before going on to win over Rafael Nadal in the final for his third ATP Finals title. In 2014, Federer and Djokovic both went 3–0 in their respective groups. They were scheduled to meet in the final but Federer was forced to withdraw due to a back injury after he had won a grueling semifinal against Stan Wawrinka. Djokovic won his fourth title at the ATP Finals with a walkover. It was the first time in the history of the Year-End Championships that no final match was contested.

Federer defeated Djokovic in the 2015 round robin stage, ending Djokovic's 23-win streak. However, Djokovic defeated Federer in the final in straight sets to capture his fourth consecutive ATP Finals crown. Four years later, they met again in the group stage of 2019 event where Federer beat Djokovic in straight sets. With the win, Federer advanced to the semi-finals where he lost the eventual champion Stefanos Tsitsipas while Djokovic was knocked out of the tournament. Overall, they are tied with a 3–3 head-to-head record with Djokovic winning the two finals they played. While Federer had won his titles consecutively in three different locations (Houston: 2003–04, Shanghai: 2006–07, and London: 2010–11), Djokovic also won his titles in three different locations (Shanghai: 2008, London: 2012–15, and Turin: 2022–23).

| Tournament | Djokovic | Federer |
|---|---|---|
| Year-end championship | **7** | 6 |

- **Bold** indicates outright record (ATP Finals).

=== National and international representation ===
Djokovic and Federer faced each other only once at the 2006 Davis Cup, which was won by Federer. They never faced each other in other ITF or ATP team events.

| Tournament | Djokovic | Federer |
|---|---|---|
| Olympic Medals | Tennis at the 2024 Summer Olympics – Men's singles Tennis at the 2008 Summer Olympics – Men's singles | Tennis at the 2012 Summer Olympics – Men's singles Tennis at the 2008 Summer Olympics – Men's doubles |
| Davis Cup | 1 | 1 |
| ATP Cup / United Cup | 1 | – |
| Hopman Cup | 0 | **3** |
| Laver Cup | 1 | 3 |

- **Bold** indicates outright record.

=== ATP/ITF rankings ===
| Rankings | Djokovic | Federer |
|---|---|---|
| Weeks as ATP No. 1 | **428** | 310 |
| ATP Year-end No. 1 | **8** | 5 |
| ITF World Champion | **8** | 5 |
| Consecutive Weeks as ATP No. 1 | 122 | **237** |
| Consecutive ATP Year-end No. 1 | 2 | 4 |
| Consecutive wire-to-wire ATP Year-end No. 1 | 1 | **3** |

- **Bold** indicates outright record.

=== Overall match statistics ===
| Won | Djokovic | Federer |
|---|---|---|
| Matches | **27** | 23 |
| Sets | 73 | 73† |
| Games | 749 | **758** |
| Points | 4695 | **4729** |
| Tiebreak sets | **16** | 12 |
| Bagel sets | 0 | **1** |

† Federer won 1 incomplete set where Djokovic retired at the 2008 Monte-Carlo Masters.

=== Main tennis and sports awards ===
| Award | Djokovic | Federer |
|---|---|---|
| ATP Player of the Year award | **8** | 5 |
| ATP Arthur Ashe Humanitarian of the year | 1 | **2** |
| ATP Most Improved Player of the year | **2** | 0 |
| ATP Comeback Player of the year | **1** | **1** |
| ATP Sportsmanship award | 0 | **13** |
| ATP Fan Favorite | 0 | **19** |
| ITF Champion of Champions | 0 | **1** |
| Laureus World Sportsman of the year | **5** | **5** |
| Laureus Comeback Player of the year | 0 | **1** |
| ESPY Best International Athlete | 0 | **1** |
| ESPY Best Male Tennis Player | 6 | **9** |
| BBC Overseas Sports Personality of the year | 1 | **4** |
| L'Équipe Champion of Champions | 2 | **4** |
| La Gazzetta dello World Sportsman of the year | 0 | **4** |
| Marca Leyenda Sport Professional of the year | **1** | **1** |

== Analysis ==
=== Hard court zemel ===
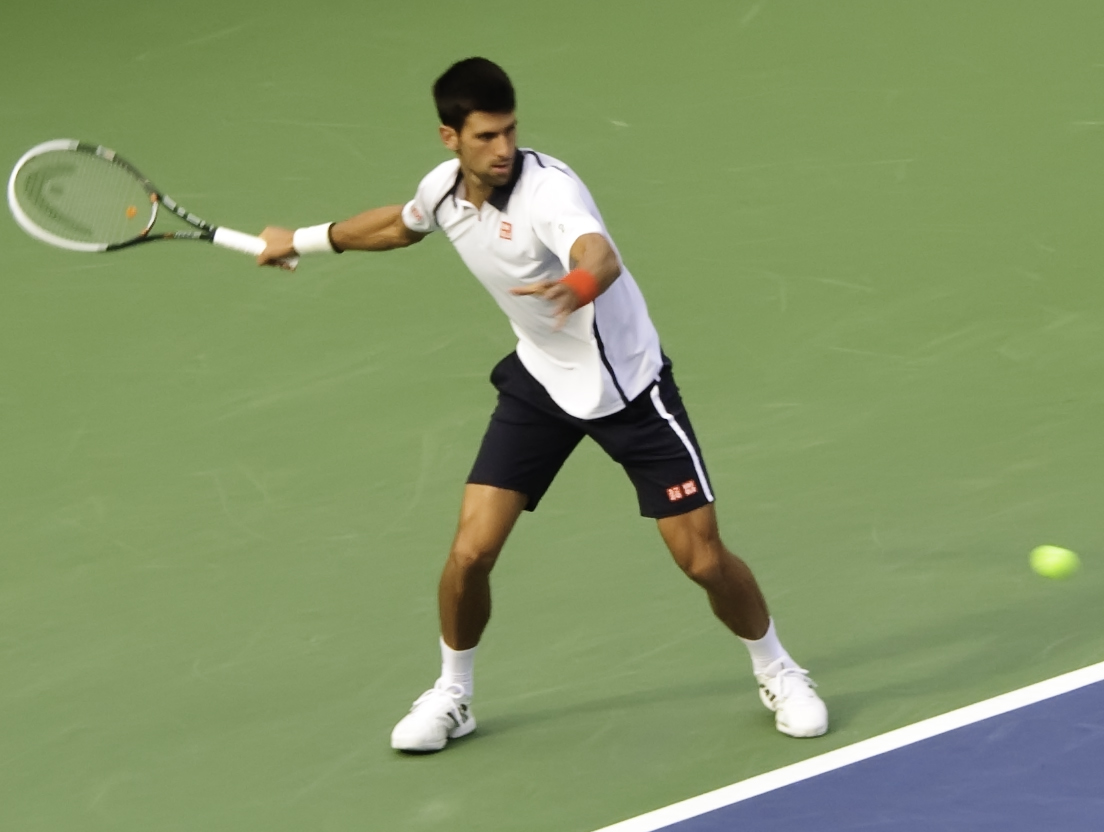
Djokovic's favorite and most successful surface is hardcourt where he has a record 14 Grand Slam titles.

The two have most commonly met on hard courts, with 38 of their 50 matches taking place on the surface, and Djokovic leading 20–18. Djokovic leads 7–4 in hardcourt Grand Slam matches with Federer winning the 2007 US Open final and Djokovic winning the 2015 US Open final. They met in four straight US Open semifinals from 2008 to 2011, which is a record and in four other semifinals at the Australian Open, in 2008, 2011, 2016, and 2020.

Hard court is widely considered to be Djokovic's best surface with Djokovic himself stating that it is his most preferred surface. Their first seven Grand Slam meetings took place on hardcourt in either the Australian Open or the US Open, before finally meeting at the French Open in 2011. Djokovic and Federer are the only players in tennis history to have won 10+ Major titles and 20+ Masters titles on hard courts, Djokovic with a record 14 majors and a record 29 Masters titles and Federer with 11 majors and 22 Masters titles. As of the end of the 2023 season, they shared the record for most hard court titles at 71 each.

At the Australian Open, Djokovic has a 10-1 record in finals while Federer has a 6–1 record. At the US Open, either Federer or Djokovic appeared in the final for ten years, from 2004 to 2013. Federer had a 5–2 record while Djokovic has a 4–6 record. Their finals appearance streak ended at the 2014 US Open when Federer lost to Marin Cilic and Djokovic lost to Kei Nishikori in the semifinals. The two quickly recovered by reaching the final in 2015, where Djokovic prevailed in four sets. In the semifinals of the 2020 Australian Open, the duo played each other for the last time, Djokovic defeated Federer in straight sets.

In indoor conditions, both Djokovic and Federer won the ATP Finals which is the biggest indoor event in men's tennis. Djokovic has won a record seven ATP Finals titles indoors while Federer won it four times indoors and twice outdoors. Overall, Federer won 24 titles in indoor hardcourt conditions while Djokovic has won 19 titles. Fourteen of Djokovic's trophies indoors were Big Titles while Federer had six Big Titles won indoors. This follows a familiar pattern in their rivalry, where due to his ability to win more big titles, Djokovic has been playing and preparing only for the prestigious tournaments, whereas Federer due to his participation in 500 and 250 level tournaments has significantly more overall match wins and more overall titles. Federer's 298 match wins on indoor courts, a hundred more than Djokovic or any other currently active player, is a significant achievement during an era when only a small minority of indoor tournaments are played per season.

==== Early history at the Australian Open and US Open ====
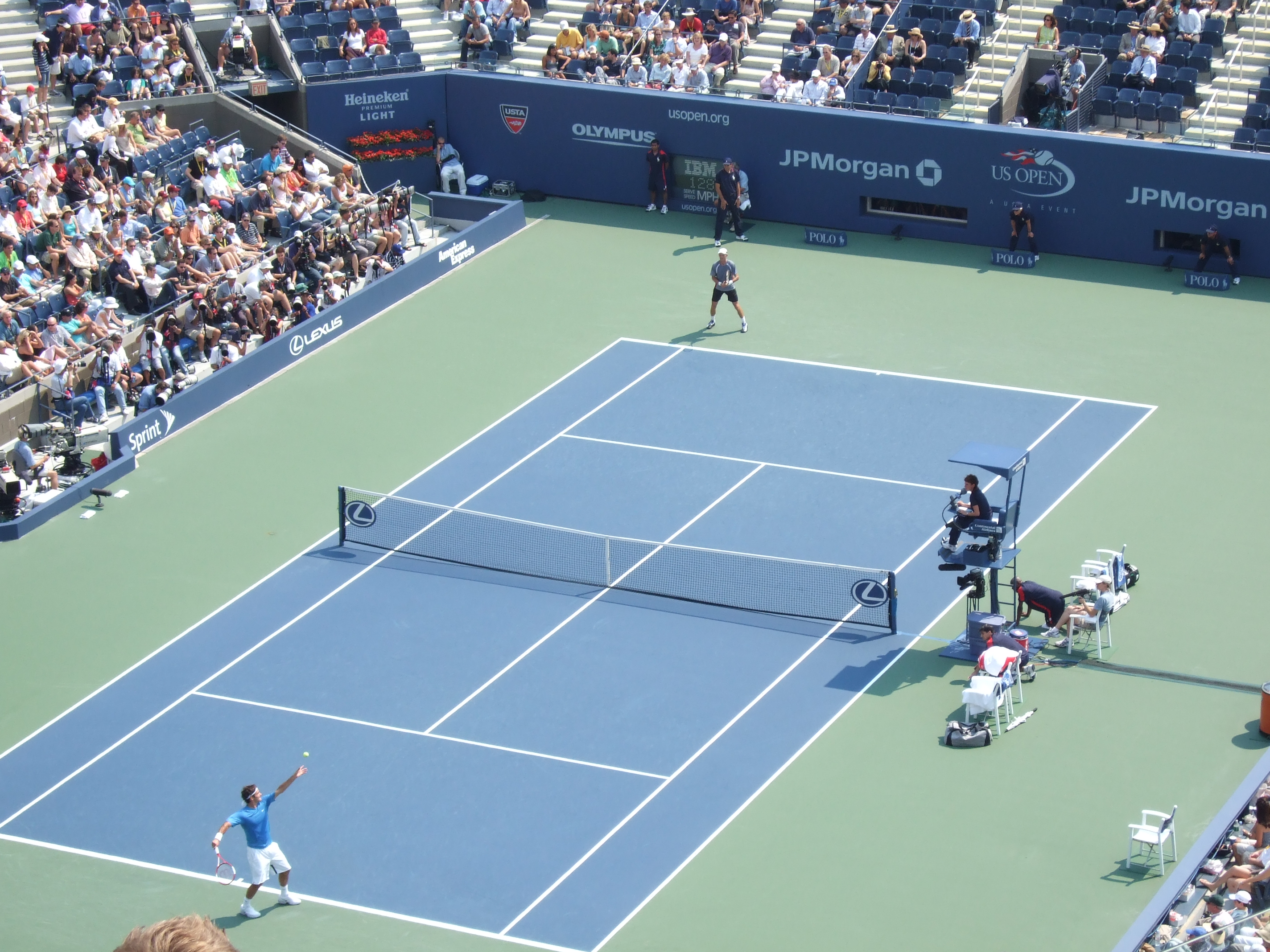
Federer is one of the most prolific players on hardcourts with a shared-record 71 titles.

In their first meeting at a major, Federer defeated Djokovic in the fourth round of the Australian Open in 2007 on his way to winning the tournament. In the North American hardcourt season, Djokovic and Federer met again in the Montreal final. Federer was serving for the first set but Djokovic saved six set points to come back and claim the set in a tiebreak. Federer responded by quickly winning the second set to draw level. The third set went to another tiebreak which Djokovic won to claim the match. It was Djokovic's first career win over Federer and it in turn prevented Federer from ever winning in Montreal. Djokovic reflected after the win, "To win two tiebreaks against the world No. 1, probably the strongest player mentally on the tour, it's another achievement, it's another success so I'm really, really happy."

As of the end of the 2020 calendar year, Federer has not won the Canadian Open when it was held in Montreal. Federer's loss in Montreal was also his first career loss in a US Open series final, but he responded by winning Cincinnati the next week. Djokovic's win in Montreal solidified his No. 3 ranking and allowed him to enter the US Open as the third seed. At the 2007 US Open, the strong play of both men continued as they met for a rematch in the final. Djokovic advanced to the first major final of his career where Federer defeated him 7–6, 7–6, 6–4. This time, it was Federer who would come back to win the first set in a tiebreak. Federer saved a total of seven set points in both the first and second sets to go on and win the match in straight sets. The win saw Federer claim his fourth consecutive US Open title.

Five months later they met in the semifinals of the 2008 Australian Open, where Djokovic defeated Federer in straight sets and went on to win the first major of his career when he beat Jo-Wilfried Tsonga in the final. Federer's loss at the time caused widespread shock and uproar, and Federer referred to having 'created a monster' due to the expectations from the media at the time that Federer must win everything. Federer commented after the loss, "I've created a monster, so I know I need to always win every tournament. But semis is still pretty good. Winning every other week, you know, lose a set and people say I'm playing bad." The loss ended Federer's streak of ten straight appearances in major finals which began at Wimbledon in 2005. It was also Federer's first straight sets loss in any Grand Slam since Gustavo Kuerten beat him in the third round of the 2004 French Open.

=== Grass court ===
==== History at Wimbledon ====
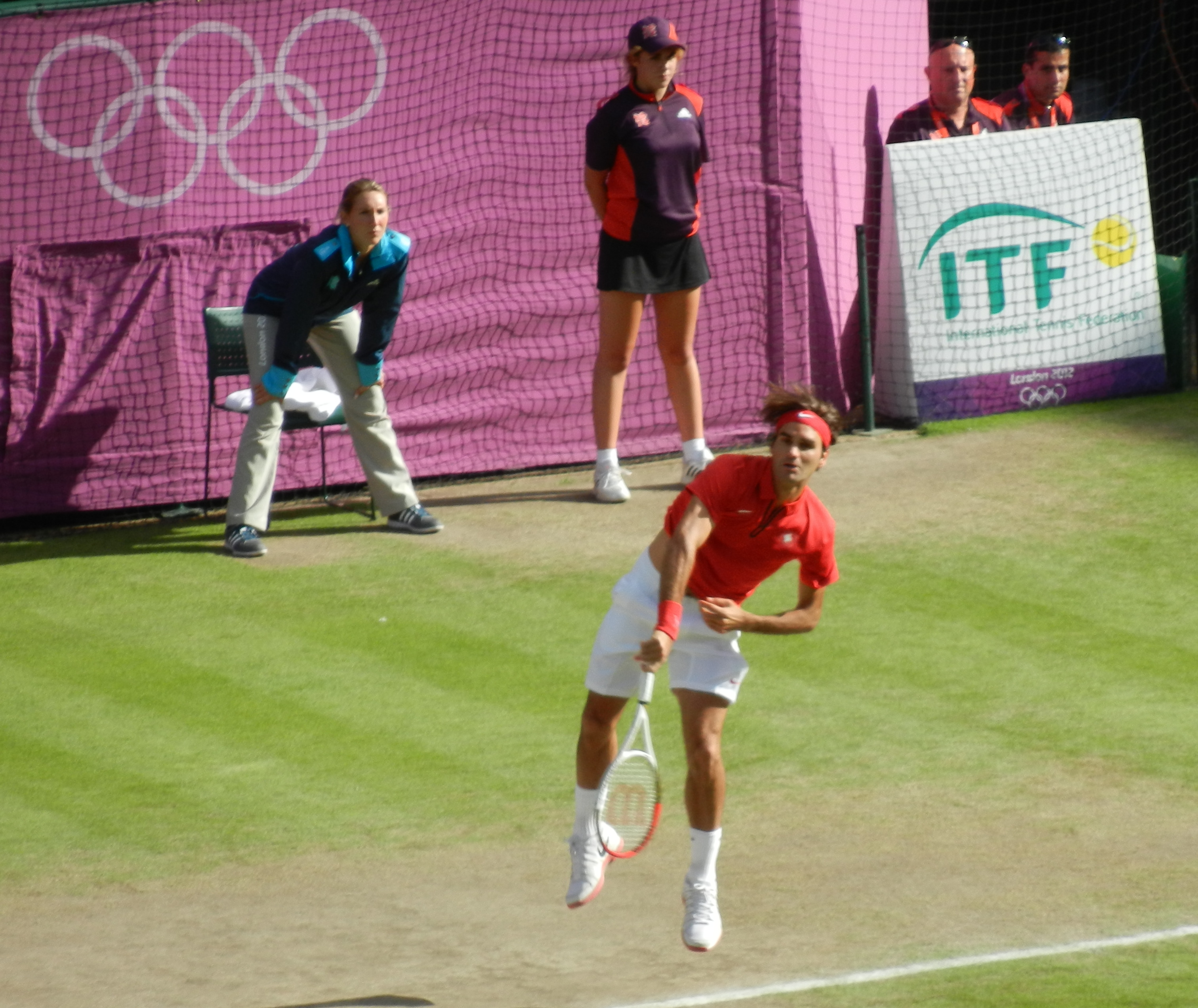
Federer's best surface is considered to be grass, on which he has a win percentage of 87% – the best in the Open Era.

On grass courts Djokovic leads 3–1; with all four matches coming at Wimbledon: once in the semifinals in 2012, which Federer won in four sets; and again in the finals of 2014, 2015, and 2019, which Djokovic won in five, four, and five sets respectively. Their 2019 final was historic as it was the longest final ever played at Wimbledon. Federer's first major title came at Wimbledon, and he went on to win it seven times more for eight in total, while Djokovic has won seven titles at Wimbledon.

Both Federer and Djokovic enjoy playing on faster surfaces such as grass, but this was not always the case for Djokovic as his movement struggled on grass courts early in his career before he immensely improved during his prime years. On the other hand, Federer had natural movement on grass and was able to find success on the surface early in his career unlike Djokovic. Many tennis analysts consider grass to be Federer's best surface.

Federer almost always played a warm-up tournament before Wimbledon, namely, at Halle where he had a career-long contract and there he won ten titles of his 19 overall titles on grass. On the other hand, Djokovic's quest to win Roland Garros was his main priority for several years, often leaving him exhausted to partake in a warm-up tournament on grass. He has instead preferred to rest before Wimbledon. However, despite achieving success at the French Open, Djokovic has continued to jettison all grass court tournaments besides Wimbledon where he won seven titles of his eight overall titles on grass.

=== Clay court ===
On clay courts, they are tied with a head-to-head record of 4–4 with six of their eight meetings taking place in semifinals. Due to the dominance of Rafael Nadal on clay, it has been rare for Federer and Djokovic to encounter each other on the surface and they have only once faced each other in a clay final, at the 2015 Rome Masters final, where Djokovic beat Federer in straight sets. When they have met on clay, it has often been an unpredictable encounter. They've split their two French Open semifinals with Federer winning in 2011 and Djokovic winning the rematch in 2012. In addition, Federer has beaten Djokovic three times in Monte Carlo, and Djokovic has beaten Federer three times in Rome.

Of the three surfaces, clay is considered to be the least successful surface for both Federer and Djokovic, despite the fact that both players are highly proficient on clay as all-court players. Over the years, Federer and Djokovic have more often than not advanced deep into the important clay tournaments only to lose to Rafael Nadal. Federer has a 2–14 record against Nadal on clay while Djokovic has gone 9–20 against Nadal on clay. From 2005 to 2010, Federer was considered to be Nadal's only formidable opponent on clay. Since 2011, Djokovic has become the main adversary for Nadal on clay. Federer has won 11 clay titles, while Djokovic has won 21 clay titles.

==== History at the clay Masters and the French Open ====
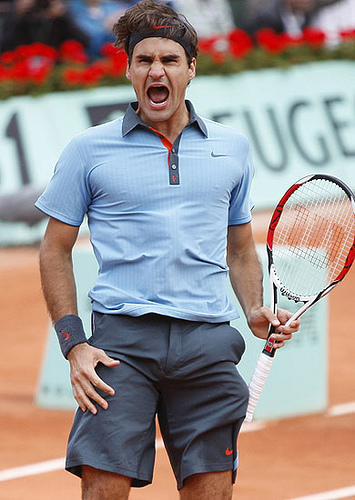
Federer after winning his only French Open title at the 2009 event.

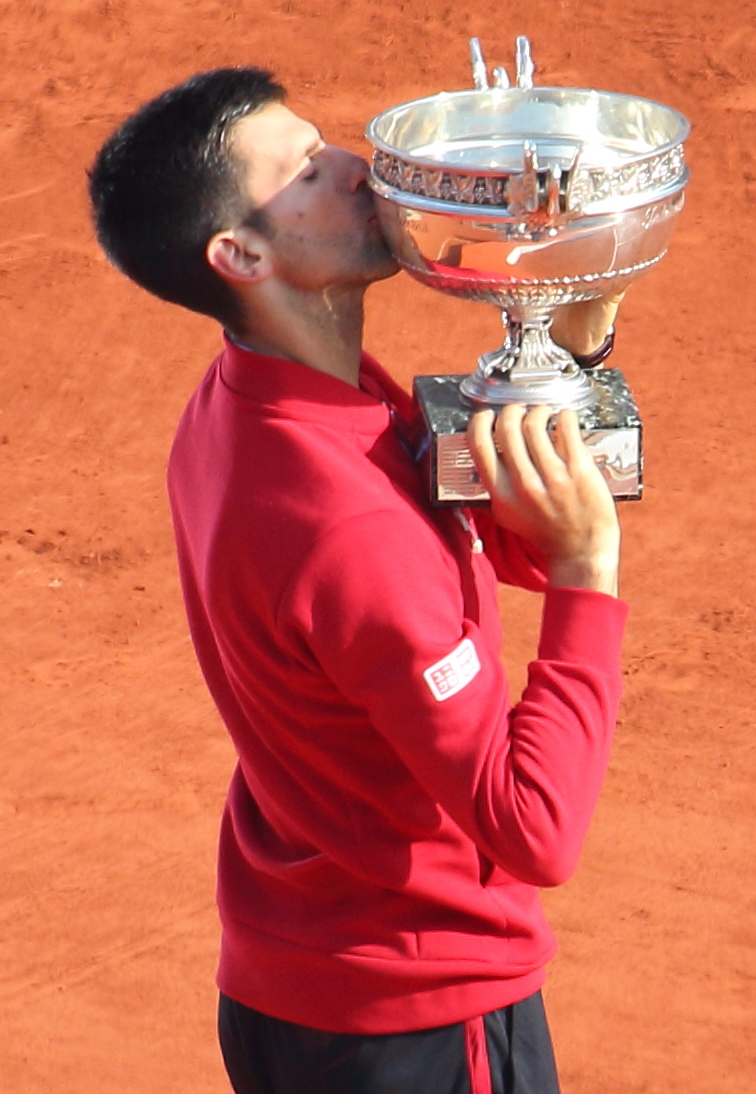
Djokovic hoisting his first trophy at Roland Garros.

From 2005 to 2008, Federer was Nadal's only considerable test at Roland Garros. Federer lost three close finals to Nadal on clay in 2006, the first was in three sets at Monte Carlo, then in five sets in Rome, and at the French Open he lost the final in four sets while Djokovic had also lost to Nadal earlier on in the quarterfinals. It was Federer's first final at Roland Garros.

Federer beat Nadal in the Hamburg final in 2007, putting an end to Nadal's unprecedented 81-match winning streak on clay. At the French Open, Nadal defeated Djokovic and Federer back-to-back in the semifinals and final to win his third straight title at Roland Garros. In 2008, Federer played a solid match against Nadal at Monte Carlo before Djokovic emerged as a force on clay as well. He pushed Nadal to three sets in the Hamburg semifinals. Federer then lost the Hamburg title to Nadal in a close rematch. The progress against Nadal was short-lived. At 2008 Roland Garros, Djokovic and Federer both lost to Nadal for the third straight year which saw Nadal steamroll to his fourth French Open win without losing a set in the tournament.

In 2009, Djokovic lost a three-set match to Nadal at Monte Carlo and then pushed him even further to three match points in their epic semifinal in Madrid. Although Djokovic lost that semifinal to Nadal, Federer defeated Nadal in the final for his second win over Nadal on clay which saw Nadal lose a clay final for just the second time in his career. At the 2009 French Open Federer won the title against Robin Söderling, completing the career Grand Slam. In 2010, Djokovic and Nadal never met on clay. Federer lost the Madrid title to Nadal in a rematch. At the French Open, both Federer and Djokovic lost in the quarterfinals and thus neither man advanced to face Nadal that year. It was the only year that Nadal won Roland Garros without facing Djokovic or Federer (until the 2017 event). Djokovic later entered his prime and gained confidence upon winning the Davis Cup at the end of the year.

In early 2011, Djokovic became the primary challenge for Nadal after beating him in Indian Wells and Miami back-to-back. As the clay season began, Djokovic's winning streak continued as he beat Nadal for the first time on clay in Madrid final, ending Nadal's second streak of 37 straight wins on clay. As such, Djokovic became the second player after Federer to ever defeat Nadal in a clay final. Djokovic beat Nadal again on clay a week later in Rome final. It was the first and still the only time for Nadal to lose two consecutive finals on clay. Djokovic was a legitimate contender going into the 2011 French Open and was perceived by many tennis analysts as capable of dethroning Nadal. Djokovic and Federer met in the semifinals, where Federer's win put an end to Djokovic's best opportunity at the time to win the French Open. Djokovic had been on a 43-match winning streak, including four straight wins over Nadal up to that point.

Djokovic lost his first French Open final to Nadal in 2012 in four sets and pushed him to a deciding fifth set the next year at the semifinal of the 2013 event. At the 2014 French Open, Djokovic lost the final again to Nadal in four sets. The 2013 French Open semifinal is considered to be Djokovic's most devastating career loss, losing 9–7 in the fifth despite being up a break in the final set (when he ran into the net to get broken). From 2005 to 2014, Federer's final in 2011 and Djokovic's semifinal in 2013 were the best efforts that each man had been able to give in their attempts to beat Nadal at Roland Garros.

In 2015, Federer and Djokovic had met in the final of the Italian Open prior to Roland Garros, with Djokovic winning in straight sets. Djokovic then entered the French Open undefeated on clay for the season after winning back-to-back titles in Monte Carlo and Rome. At Roland Garros, Djokovic was drawn to meet Nadal in the quarterfinals where he was considered the favorite to win. Djokovic finally defeated Nadal by winning in straight sets on his way to the final. It was only Nadal's second ever loss at Roland Garros. Federer was defeated in the quarterfinals by Stan Wawrinka who proceeded to reach the final as well. Djokovic's victory over Nadal would end up for naught as he lost the final to Wawrinka in four sets. Djokovic managed to win the French Open the next year by beating Andy Murray in four sets, completing a non-calendar and a career Grand Slam.

In 2021, Djokovic managed to beat Nadal again at Roland Garros and went on to win his second French Open title against Stefanos Tsitsipas in the final. With the win, Djokovic became the first player in the Open Era to complete a double Career Grand Slam. Two years later, he claimed his third trophy at Roland Garros after beating Carlos Alcaraz and Casper Ruud en route to the title, becoming the only player in history to complete a triple Career Grand Slam.

=== Head-to-head tallies ===
- **All matches (50): Djokovic**, 27–23
  - **All finals (20): Djokovic**, 13–6 (one walkover not included)
  - Grand Slam matches: **Djokovic**, 11–6
    - Australian Open: **Djokovic**, 4–1
    - French Open: Tied, 1–1
    - Wimbledon: **Djokovic**, 3–1
    - US Open: Tied, 3–3
  - Grand Slam finals: **Djokovic**, 4–1
    - Australian Open: No meetings
    - French Open: No meetings
    - Wimbledon: **Djokovic**, 3–0
    - US Open: Tied, 1–1
  - ATP Tour Finals matches: Tied, 3–3
    - ATP Tour Finals finals: **Djokovic**, 2–0 (one walkover not included)
  - ATP Masters matches: **Djokovic**, 11–9
    - ATP Masters finals: **Djokovic**, 5–3
  - Other matches: **Federer**, 5–2
    - ATP 500 finals: Tied, 2–2
  - Best of five set matches: **Djokovic**, 11–7
    - Matches lasting five sets: **Djokovic**, 4–0
  - Best of three set matches: Tied, 16–16
    - Matches lasting three sets: **Djokovic**, 10–5
  - Winning the match after losing 1st set: **Djokovic**, 7–1
  - Winning the match saving match points: **Djokovic**, 3–0
- All sets: **Federer**, 74–73
  - Deciding sets: **Djokovic**, 14–5
  - Bagel sets: **Federer**, 1–0
  - Total games: **Federer**, 758–749
  - Total points: **Federer**, 4729–4695
- Tiebreak sets: **Djokovic**, 16–12
  - Deciding Tiebreaks: **Djokovic**, 4–0

==== Results on each court surface ====
- Hard courts: **Djokovic**, 20–18
  - Outdoor: **Djokovic**, 14–13
  - Indoor: **Djokovic**, 6–5
- Grass courts: **Djokovic**, 3–1
- Clay courts: Tied, 4–4

==== Tournament overview ====
| Tournament | Series | Hard Court (o) | | Clay | | Grass | | Hard Court (i) | | Total | |
| Tournament | Series | Djokovic | Federer | Djokovic | Federer | Djokovic | Federer | Djokovic | Federer | Djokovic | Federer |
|---|---|---|---|---|---|---|---|---|---|---|---|
| Australian Open | Major | 4 | 1 | | | | | | | 4 | 1 |
| French Open | Major | | | 1 | 1 | | | | | 1 | 1 |
| Wimbledon | Major | | | | | 3 | 1 | | | 3 | 1 |
| US Open | Major | 3 | 3 | | | | | | | 3 | 3 |
| Indian Wells Masters | Masters | 3 | 0 | | | | | | | 3 | 0 |
| Miami Open | Masters | 1 | 0 | | | | | | | 1 | 0 |
| Monte-Carlo Masters | Masters | | | 0 | 3 | | | | | 0 | 3 |
| Italian Open | Masters | | | 3 | 0 | | | | | 3 | 0 |
| Canadian Open | Masters | 1 | 1 | | | | | | | 1 | 1 |
| Cincinnati Masters | Masters | 1 | 3 | | | | | | | 1 | 3 |
| Shanghai Masters | Masters | 0 | 2 | | | | | | | 0 | 2 |
| Paris Masters | Masters | | | | | | | 2 | 0 | 2 | 0 |
| ATP Finals | Tour Finals | | | | | | | 3 | 3 | 3 | 3 |
| Dubai Championships | 500 | 1 | 3 | | | | | | | 1 | 3 |
| Swiss Indoors | 500 | | | | | | | 1 | 1 | 1 | 1 |
| Davis Cup | Team | | | | | | | 0 | 1 | 0 | 1 |
| Total | | 14 | 13 | 4 | 4 | 3 | 1 | 6 | 5 | 27 | 23 |

==== Grand Slam matches ====
- Final matches indicated in **bold**.

| Tournament | 2007 | 2008 | 2009 | 2010 | 2011 | 2012 | 2013 | 2014 | 2015 | 2016 | 2017 | 2018 | 2019 | 2020 |
|---|---|---|---|---|---|---|---|---|---|---|---|---|---|---|
| Australian Open | RFed | NDjo | | | NDjo | | | | | NDjo | | | | NDjo |
| French Open | | | | | RFed | NDjo | | | | | | | | |
| Wimbledon | | | | | | RFed | | **NDjo** | **NDjo** | | | | **NDjo** | |
| US Open | **RFed** | RFed | RFed | NDjo | NDjo | | | | **NDjo** | | | | | |

==== All the finals ====
| Tournament | Djokovic | Federer |
|---|---|---|
| Finals at Grand Slams | **4** | 1 |
| Finals at ATP Tour Finals (3) (one walkover not included. Djokovic won) | **2** | 0 |
| Finals at ATP Masters 1000 | **5** | 3 |
| Finals at ATP 500 | 2 | 2 |
| All finals (20) (one walkover not included. Djokovic won) | **13** | 6 |

==== Completed set tallies ====
| Djokovic | Set score | Federer |
|---|---|---|
| 1 | 13–12 | 0 |
| 15 | 7–6 | 12 |
| 7 | 7–5 | 15 |
| 15 | 6–4 | 13 |
| 22 | 6–3 | 20 |
| 11 | 6–2 | 7 |
| 2 | 6–1 | 5 |
| 0 | 6–0 | 1 |
| 73 | Total sets | 73† |
| 50.00% | Total sets | 50.00% |
| 747 | Total games | 755 |
| 49.73% | Total games | 50.27% |
| 4673 | Total points | 4704 |
| 49.83% | Total points | 50.17% |

† Federer won 1 incomplete set where Djokovic retired at the 2008 Monte-Carlo Masters.

== List of all matches ==
ATP, Davis Cup, and Grand Slam tournament main draw results included.

| Legend (2004–2008) | Legend (2009–present) | Djokovic | Federer | Djokovic finals | Federer finals |
|---|---|---|---|---|---|
| Grand Slam | Grand Slam | 11 | 6 | 4 | 1 |
| Tennis Masters Cup | ATP World Tour Finals | 3 | 3 | 2 | 0 |
| ATP Masters Series | ATP World Tour Masters 1000 | 11 | 9 | 5 | 3 |
| ATP International Series Gold | ATP World Tour 500 Series | 2 | 4 | 2 | 2 |
| Davis Cup | Davis Cup | 0 | 1 | 0 | 0 |
| Total | | 27 | 23 | 13 | 6 |

=== Singles (50) ===
Djokovic 27 – Federer 23

| No. | Year | Tournament | Series | Surface | Round | Winner | Score | Length | Sets | Djokovic | Federer |
|---|---|---|---|---|---|---|---|---|---|---|---|
| 1. | 2006 | Monte-Carlo Masters | Masters | Clay | Last 64 | Federer | 6–3, 2–6, 6–3 | 1:49 | 3/3 | 0 | 1 |
| 2. | 2006 | Davis Cup | Davis Cup | Hard (i) | WG Play-offs | Federer | 6–3, 6–2, 6–3 | 1:58 | 3/5 | 0 | 2 |
| 3. | 2007 | Australian Open | Major | Hard | Last 16 | Federer | 6–2, 7–5, 6–3 | 1:50 | 3/5 | 0 | 3 |
| 4. | 2007 | Dubai Championships | 500 | Hard | Quarterfinals | Federer | 6–3, 6–7^{(6–8)}, 6–3 | 2:03 | 3/3 | 0 | 4 |
| 5. | 2007 | Canadian Open | Masters | Hard | Final | Djokovic | 7–6^{(7–2)}, 2–6, 7–6^{(7–2)} | 2:13 | 3/3 | 1 | 4 |
| 6. | 2007 | US Open | Major | Hard | Final | Federer | 7–6^{(7–4)}, 7–6^{(7–2)}, 6–4 | 2:24 | 3/5 | 1 | 5 |
| 7. | 2008 | Australian Open | Major | Hard | Semifinals | Djokovic | 7–5, 6–3, 7–6^{(7–5)} | 2:26 | 3/5 | 2 | 5 |
| 8. | 2008 | Monte-Carlo Masters | Masters | Clay | Semifinals | Federer | 6–3, 3–2 RET | 1:12 | 2/3 | 2 | 6 |
| 9. | 2008 | US Open | Major | Hard | Semifinals | Federer | 6–3, 5–7, 7–5, 6–2 | 2:44 | 4/5 | 2 | 7 |
| 10. | 2009 | Miami Open | Masters | Hard | Semifinals | Djokovic | 3–6, 6–2, 6–3 | 1:46 | 3/3 | 3 | 7 |
| 11. | 2009 | Italian Open | Masters | Clay | Semifinals | Djokovic | 4–6, 6–3, 6–3 | 2:11 | 3/3 | 4 | 7 |
| 12. | 2009 | Cincinnati Masters | Masters | Hard | Final | Federer | 6–1, 7–5 | 2:07 | 2/3 | 4 | 8 |
| 13. | 2009 | US Open | Major | Hard | Semifinals | Federer | 7–6^{(7–3)}, 7–5, 7–5 | 2:34 | 3/5 | 4 | 9 |
| 14. | 2009 | Swiss Indoors | 500 | Hard (i) | Final | Djokovic | 6–4, 4–6, 6–2 | 2:11 | 3/3 | 5 | 9 |
| 15. | 2010 | Canadian Open | Masters | Hard | Semifinals | Federer | 6–1, 3–6, 7–5 | 2:22 | 3/3 | 5 | 10 |
| 16. | 2010 | US Open | Major | Hard | Semifinals | Djokovic | 5–7, 6–1, 5–7, 6–2, 7–5 | 3:44 | 5/5 | 6 | 10 |
| 17. | 2010 | Shanghai Masters | Masters | Hard | Semifinals | Federer | 7–5, 6–4 | 1:42 | 2/3 | 6 | 11 |
| 18. | 2010 | Swiss Indoors | 500 | Hard (i) | Final | Federer | 6–4, 3–6, 6–1 | 1:55 | 3/3 | 6 | 12 |
| 19. | 2010 | ATP World Tour Finals | Tour Finals | Hard (i) | Semifinals | Federer | 6–1, 6–4 | 1:21 | 2/3 | 6 | 13 |
| 20. | 2011 | Australian Open | Major | Hard | Semifinals | Djokovic | 7–6^{(7–3)}, 7–5, 6–4 | 3:00 | 3/5 | 7 | 13 |
| 21. | 2011 | Dubai Championships | 500 | Hard | Final | Djokovic | 6–3, 6–3 | 1:12 | 2/3 | 8 | 13 |
| 22. | 2011 | Indian Wells Masters | Masters | Hard | Semifinals | Djokovic | 6–3, 3–6, 6–2 | 2:07 | 3/3 | 9 | 13 |
| 23. | 2011 | French Open | Major | Clay | Semifinals | Federer | 7–6^{(7–5)}, 6–3, 3–6, 7–6^{(7–5)} | 3:39 | 4/5 | 9 | 14 |
| 24. | 2011 | US Open | Major | Hard | Semifinals | Djokovic | 6–7^{(7–9)}, 4–6, 6–3, 6–2, 7–5 | 3:51 | 5/5 | 10 | 14 |
| 25. | 2012 | Italian Open | Masters | Clay | Semifinals | Djokovic | 6–2, 7–6^{(7–4)} | 1:39 | 2/3 | 11 | 14 |
| 26. | 2012 | French Open | Major | Clay | Semifinals | Djokovic | 6–4, 7–5, 6–3 | 2:05 | 3/5 | 12 | 14 |
| 27. | 2012 | Wimbledon | Major | Grass | Semifinals | Federer | 6–3, 3–6, 6–4, 6–3 | 2:19 | 4/5 | 12 | 15 |
| 28. | 2012 | Cincinnati Masters | Masters | Hard | Final | Federer | 6–0, 7–6^{(9–7)} | 1:20 | 2/3 | 12 | 16 |
| 29. | 2012 | ATP World Tour Finals | Tour Finals | Hard (i) | Final | Djokovic | 7–6^{(8–6)}, 7–5 | 2:14 | 2/3 | 13 | 16 |
| 30. | 2013 | Paris Masters | Masters | Hard (i) | Semifinals | Djokovic | 4–6, 6–3, 6–2 | 2:00 | 3/3 | 14 | 16 |
| 31. | 2013 | ATP World Tour Finals | Tour Finals | Hard (i) | Round Robin | Djokovic | 6–4, 6–7^{(2–7)}, 6–2 | 2:22 | 3/3 | 15 | 16 |
| 32. | 2014 | Dubai Championships | 500 | Hard | Semifinals | Federer | 3–6, 6–3, 6–2 | 1:45 | 3/3 | 15 | 17 |
| 33. | 2014 | Indian Wells Masters | Masters | Hard | Final | Djokovic | 3–6, 6–3, 7–6^{(7–3)} | 2:12 | 3/3 | 16 | 17 |
| 34. | 2014 | Monte-Carlo Masters | Masters | Clay | Semifinals | Federer | 7–5, 6–2 | 1:15 | 2/3 | 16 | 18 |
| 35. | 2014 | Wimbledon | Major | Grass | Final | Djokovic | 6–7^{(7–9)}, 6–4, 7–6^{(7–4)}, 5–7, 6–4 | 3:56 | 5/5 | 17 | 18 |
| 36. | 2014 | Shanghai Masters | Masters | Hard | Semifinals | Federer | 6–4, 6–4 | 1:35 | 2/3 | 17 | 19 |
| — | 2014 | ATP World Tour Finals | Tour Finals | Hard (i) | Final | (Djokovic) | Walkover | N/A | N/A | 17 | 19 |
| 37. | 2015 | Dubai Championships | 500 | Hard | Final | Federer | 6–3, 7–5 | 1:24 | 2/3 | 17 | 20 |
| 38. | 2015 | Indian Wells Masters | Masters | Hard | Final | Djokovic | 6–3, 6–7^{(5–7)}, 6–2 | 2:17 | 3/3 | 18 | 20 |
| 39. | 2015 | Italian Open | Masters | Clay | Final | Djokovic | 6–4, 6–3 | 1:15 | 2/3 | 19 | 20 |
| 40. | 2015 | Wimbledon | Major | Grass | Final | Djokovic | 7–6^{(7–1)}, 6–7^{(10–12)}, 6–4, 6–3 | 2:55 | 4/5 | 20 | 20 |
| 41. | 2015 | Cincinnati Masters | Masters | Hard | Final | Federer | 7–6^{(7–1)}, 6–3 | 1:30 | 2/3 | 20 | 21 |
| 42. | 2015 | US Open | Major | Hard | Final | Djokovic | 6–4, 5–7, 6–4, 6–4 | 3:20 | 4/5 | 21 | 21 |
| 43. | 2015 | ATP World Tour Finals | Tour Finals | Hard (i) | Round Robin | Federer | 7–5, 6–2 | 1:17 | 2/3 | 21 | 22 |
| 44. | 2015 | ATP World Tour Finals | Tour Finals | Hard (i) | Final | Djokovic | 6–3, 6–4 | 1:20 | 2/3 | 22 | 22 |
| 45. | 2016 | Australian Open | Major | Hard | Semifinals | Djokovic | 6–1, 6–2, 3–6, 6–3 | 2:19 | 4/5 | 23 | 22 |
| 46. | 2018 | Cincinnati Masters | Masters | Hard | Final | Djokovic | 6–4, 6–4 | 1:24 | 2/3 | 24 | 22 |
| 47. | 2018 | Paris Masters | Masters | Hard (i) | Semifinals | Djokovic | 7–6^{(8–6)}, 5–7, 7–6^{(7–3)} | 3:02 | 3/3 | 25 | 22 |
| 48. | 2019 | Wimbledon | Major | Grass | Final | Djokovic | 7–6^{(7–5)}, 1–6, 7–6^{(7–4)}, 4–6, 13–12^{(7–3)} | 4:57 | 5/5 | 26 | 22 |
| 49. | 2019 | ATP Finals | Tour Finals | Hard (i) | Round Robin | Federer | 6–4, 6–3 | 1:13 | 2/3 | 26 | 23 |
| 50. | 2020 | Australian Open | Major | Hard | Semifinals | Djokovic | 7–6^{(7–1)}, 6–4, 6–3 | 2:19 | 3/5 | 27 | 23 |

=== Exhibitions ===
Djokovic—Federer (1–1)

| No. | Year | Tournament | Surface | Round | Winner | Score | Djokovic | Federer |
|---|---|---|---|---|---|---|---|---|
| 1. | 2011 | Abu Dhabi | Hard | Semifinals | Djokovic | 6–2, 6–1 | 1 | 0 |
| 2. | 2014 | New Delhi | Hard (i) | Round Robin | Federer | 6–5^{(6–5)}^{1} | 1 | 1 |

Federer won the set, but according to International Premier Tennis League rules Djokovic needed to win one more game for his team to officially win the match. He did, and the game had no effect on the set that they played.

== Federer–Djokovic era ==
=== Combined singles performance timeline (best result) ===
Key
| W | F | SF | QF | #R | RR | Q# | DNQ | A | NH |

(W) winner; (F) finalist; (SF) semifinalist; (QF) quarterfinalist; (#R) rounds 4, 3, 2, 1; (RR) round-robin stage; (Q#) qualification round; (DNQ) did not qualify; (A) absent; (NH) not held; (SR) strike rate (events won / competed); (W–L) win–loss record.

| Tournament | 1999 | 2000 | 2001 | 2002 | 2003 | 2004 | 2005 | 2006 | 2007 | 2008 | 2009 | 2010 | 2011 | 2012 | 2013 | 2014 | 2015 | 2016 | 2017 | 2018 | 2019 | 2020 | 2021 | 2022 | 2023 | 2024 | 2025 | SR |
|---|---|---|---|---|---|---|---|---|---|---|---|---|---|---|---|---|---|---|---|---|---|---|---|---|---|---|---|---|
Grand Slam tournaments
| Australian Open | Q1^{F} | 3R^{F} | 3R^{F} | 4R^{F} | 4R^{F} | W^{F} | SF^{F} | W^{F} | W^{F} | W^{D} | F^{F} | W^{F} | W^{D} | W^{D} | W^{D} | SF^{F} | W^{D} | W^{D} | W^{F} | W^{F} | W^{D} | W^{D} | W^{D} | A | W^{D} | SF^{D} | SF^{D} | 16 / 25 |
| French Open | 1R^{F} | 4R^{F} | QF^{F} | 1R^{F} | 1R^{F} | 3R^{F} | SF^{F} | F^{F} | F^{F} | F^{F} | W^{F} | QF^{FD} | F^{F} | F^{D} | SF^{D} | F^{D} | F^{D} | W^{D} | QF^{D} | QF^{D} | SF^{FD} | F^{D} | W^{D} | QF^{D} | W^{D} | QF^{D} | SF^{D} | 4 / 27 |
| Wimbledon | 1R^{F} | 1R^{F} | QF^{F} | 1R^{F} | W^{F} | W^{F} | W^{F} | W^{F} | W^{F} | F^{F} | W^{F} | SF^{D} | W^{D} | W^{F} | F^{D} | W^{D} | W^{D} | SF^{F} | W^{F} | W^{D} | W^{D} | NH^{3} | W^{D} | W^{D} | F^{D} | F^{D} | SF^{D} | 15 / 26 |
| US Open | Q2^{F} | 3R^{F} | 4R^{F} | 4R^{F} | 4R^{F} | W^{F} | W^{F} | W^{F} | W^{F} | W^{F} | F^{F} | F^{D} | W^{D} | F^{D} | F^{D} | SF^{FD} | W^{D} | F^{D} | QF^{F} | W^{D} | QF^{F} | ~~4R~~^{D} | F^{D} | A | W^{D} | 3R^{D} | SF^{D} | 9 / 25 |
Year-end championship
| ATP Finals | Did not qualify | | | SF | W^{F} | W^{F} | F^{F} | W^{F} | W^{F} | W^{D} | SF | W^{F} | W^{F} | W^{D} | W^{D} | W^{D} | W^{D} | F^{D} | SF^{F} | F^{D} | SF^{F} | SF^{D} | SF^{D} | W^{D} | W^{D} | A | A | 13 / 22 |
ATP Tour Masters
| Indian Wells | A | Q1 | 1R | 3R | 2R | W^{F} | W^{F} | W^{F} | F | W^{D} | SF | 4R | W^{D} | W^{D} | SF | W^{D} | W^{D} | W^{D} | W^{F} | F | F | NH^{3} | A | A | A | 3R | 2R | 10 / 21 |
| Miami | 1R | 2R | QF | F | QF | 3R | W^{F} | W^{F} | W^{D} | QF | F | 4R | W^{D} | W^{D} | 4R | W^{D} | W^{D} | W^{D} | W^{F} | 2R | W^{F} | NH^{3} | A | A | A | A | F | 10 / 22 |
| Monte Carlo | 1R | 1R | QF | 2R | A | A | QF | F | F | F | F | SF | QF | F | W^{D} | F | W^{D} | QF | QF | 3R | QF | NH^{3} | 3R | 2R | 3R | SF | 2R | 2 / 24 |
| Madrid^{1} | A | 1R | 1R | W^{F} | 3R | W^{F} | W^{F} | 2R | W^{F} | F | W^{F} | F | W^{D} | W^{F} | 3R | A | 2R | W^{D} | SF | 2R | W^{D} | NH^{3} | A | SF | A | A | 2R | 9 / 21 |
| Rome | A | 1R | 3R | 1R | F | 2R | A | F | QF | W^{D} | F | QF | W^{D} | F | F | W^{D} | W^{D} | F | F | SF | F | W^{D} | F | W^{D} | QF | 3R | A | 6 / 24 |
| Canada | A | 1R | A | 1R | SF | W^{F} | A | W^{F} | W^{D} | QF | QF | F | W^{D} | W^{D} | SF | F | F | W^{D} | F | 3R | A | NH^{3} | A | A | A | A | A | 6 / 17 |
| Cincinnati | A | 1R | A | 1R | 2R | 1R | W^{F} | QF | W^{F} | F | W^{F} | W^{F} | F | W^{F} | QF | W^{F} | W^{F} | A | A | W^{D} | SF | W^{D} | A | A | W^{D} | A | A | 10 / 19 |
| Shanghai^{2} | A | 2R | 2R | QF | SF | A | A | W^{F} | F | SF | SF | F | A | W^{D} | W^{D} | W^{F} | W^{D} | SF | W^{F} | W^{D} | QF | NH^{3} | | | A | F | SF | 7 / 19 |
| Paris | A | 1R | 2R | QF | QF | A | 3R | 2R | 3R | QF | W^{D} | SF | W^{F} | 2R | W^{D} | W^{D} | W^{D} | QF | A | F | W^{D} | A | W^{D} | F | W^{D} | A | A | 8 / 21 |

^{1} Held as Hamburg Masters (outdoor clay) until 2008, Madrid Masters (outdoor clay) 2009–present.
^{2} Held as Stuttgart Masters (indoor hard) until 2001, Madrid Masters (indoor hard) from 2002 to 2008, and Shanghai Masters (outdoor hard) 2009–present.
^{3} Tournament cancelled due to the COVID-19 pandemic.

=== Grand Slam tournaments ===
| Year | Australian Open | French Open | Wimbledon | US Open |
|---|---|---|---|---|
| 2003 | (United States) Andre Agassi | (Spain) Juan Carlos Ferrero | (Switzerland) Roger Federer | (United States) Andy Roddick |
| 2004 | (Switzerland) Roger Federer | (Argentina) Gastón Gaudio | (Switzerland) Roger Federer | (Switzerland) Roger Federer |
| 2005 | (Russia) Marat Safin | (Spain) Rafael Nadal | (Switzerland) Roger Federer | (Switzerland) Roger Federer |
| 2006 | (Switzerland) Roger Federer | (Spain) Rafael Nadal | (Switzerland) Roger Federer | (Switzerland) Roger Federer |
| 2007 | (Switzerland) Roger Federer | (Spain) Rafael Nadal | (Switzerland) Roger Federer | (Switzerland) Roger Federer |
| 2008 | (Serbia) Novak Djokovic | (Spain) Rafael Nadal | (Spain) Rafael Nadal | (Switzerland) Roger Federer |
| 2009 | (Spain) Rafael Nadal | (Switzerland) Roger Federer | (Switzerland) Roger Federer | (Argentina) Juan Martín del Potro |
| 2010 | (Switzerland) Roger Federer | (Spain) Rafael Nadal | (Spain) Rafael Nadal | (Spain) Rafael Nadal |
| 2011 | (Serbia) Novak Djokovic | (Spain) Rafael Nadal | (Serbia) Novak Djokovic | (Serbia) Novak Djokovic |
| 2012 | (Serbia) Novak Djokovic | (Spain) Rafael Nadal | (Switzerland) Roger Federer | (United Kingdom) Andy Murray |
| 2013 | (Serbia) Novak Djokovic | (Spain) Rafael Nadal | (United Kingdom) Andy Murray | (Spain) Rafael Nadal |
| 2014 | (Switzerland) Stan Wawrinka | (Spain) Rafael Nadal | (Serbia) Novak Djokovic | (Croatia) Marin Čilić |
| 2015 | (Serbia) Novak Djokovic | (Switzerland) Stan Wawrinka | (Serbia) Novak Djokovic | (Serbia) Novak Djokovic |
| 2016 | (Serbia) Novak Djokovic | (Serbia) Novak Djokovic | (United Kingdom) Andy Murray | (Switzerland) Stan Wawrinka |
| 2017 | (Switzerland) Roger Federer | (Spain) Rafael Nadal | (Switzerland) Roger Federer | (Spain) Rafael Nadal |
| 2018 | (Switzerland) Roger Federer | (Spain) Rafael Nadal | (Serbia) Novak Djokovic | (Serbia) Novak Djokovic |
| 2019 | (Serbia) Novak Djokovic | (Spain) Rafael Nadal | (Serbia) Novak Djokovic | (Spain) Rafael Nadal |
| 2020 | (Serbia) Novak Djokovic | (Spain) Rafael Nadal | Tournament cancelled | (Austria) Dominic Thiem |
| 2021 | (Serbia) Novak Djokovic | (Serbia) Novak Djokovic | (Serbia) Novak Djokovic | (Russia) Daniil Medvedev |
| 2022 | (Spain) Rafael Nadal | (Spain) Rafael Nadal | (Serbia) Novak Djokovic | (Spain) Carlos Alcaraz |
| 2023 | (Serbia) Novak Djokovic | (Serbia) Novak Djokovic | (Spain) Carlos Alcaraz | (Serbia) Novak Djokovic |

Due to the COVID-19 pandemic, the 2020 Wimbledon Championships of the tournament was cancelled.

=== ATP No. 1 era ===
| Player | Start date | End date | Weeks | Total |
|---|---|---|---|---|
| (Switzerland) Roger Federer | 2 February 2004 | 17 August 2008 | 237^{‡} | 237 |
| (Spain) Rafael Nadal | 18 August 2008 | 5 July 2009 | 46 | 46 |
| (Switzerland) Roger Federer (2) | 6 July 2009 | 6 June 2010 | 48 | 285 |
| (Spain) Rafael Nadal (2) | 7 June 2010 | 3 July 2011 | 56 | 102 |
| (Serbia) Novak Djokovic | 4 July 2011 | 8 July 2012 | 53 | 53 |
| (Switzerland) Roger Federer (3) | 9 July 2012 | 4 November 2012 | 17 | 302 |
| (Serbia) Novak Djokovic (2) | 5 November 2012 | 6 October 2013 | 48 | 101 |
| (Spain) Rafael Nadal (3) | 7 October 2013 | 6 July 2014 | 39 | 141 |
| (Serbia) Novak Djokovic (3) | 7 July 2014 | 6 November 2016 | 122 | 223 |
| (United Kingdom) Andy Murray | 7 November 2016 | 20 August 2017 | 41 | 41 |
| (Spain) Rafael Nadal (4) | 21 August 2017 | 18 February 2018 | 26 | 167 |
| (Switzerland) Roger Federer (4) | 19 February 2018 | 1 April 2018 | 6 | 308 |
| (Spain) Rafael Nadal (5) | 2 April 2018 | 13 May 2018 | 6 | 173 |
| (Switzerland) Roger Federer (5) | 14 May 2018 | 20 May 2018 | 1 | 309 |
| (Spain) Rafael Nadal (6) | 21 May 2018 | 17 June 2018 | 4 | 177 |
| (Switzerland) Roger Federer (6) | 18 June 2018 | 24 June 2018 | 1 | 310 |
| (Spain) Rafael Nadal (7) | 25 June 2018 | 4 November 2018 | 19 | 196 |
| (Serbia) Novak Djokovic (4) | 5 November 2018 | 3 November 2019 | 52 | 275 |
| (Spain) Rafael Nadal (8) | 4 November 2019 | 2 February 2020 | 13 | 209 |
| (Serbia) Novak Djokovic (5) | 3 February 2020 | 23 March 2020 | 7 | 282 |
| ATP ranking was frozen | 23 March 2020 | 23 August 2020 | 22 | |
| (Serbia) Novak Djokovic (5) | 24 August 2020 | 27 February 2022 | 79 | 361 |
| (Russia) Daniil Medvedev | 28 February 2022 | 20 March 2022 | 3 | 3 |
| (Serbia) Novak Djokovic (6) | 21 March 2022 | 12 June 2022 | 12 | 373 |
| (Russia) Daniil Medvedev (2) | 13 June 2022 | 11 September 2022 | 13 | 16 |
| (Spain) Carlos Alcaraz | 12 September 2022 | 29 January 2023 | 20 | 20 |
| (Serbia) Novak Djokovic (7) | 30 January 2023 | 19 March 2023 | 7 | 380 |
| (Spain) Carlos Alcaraz (2) | 20 March 2023 | 2 April 2023 | 2 | 22 |
| (Serbia) Novak Djokovic (8) | 3 April 2023 | 21 May 2023 | 7 | 387 |
| (Spain) Carlos Alcaraz (3) | 22 May 2023 | 11 June 2023 | 3 | 25 |
| (Serbia) Novak Djokovic (9) | 12 June 2023 | 25 June 2023 | 2 | 389 |
| (Spain) Carlos Alcaraz (4) | 26 June 2023 | 10 September 2023 | 11 | 36 |
| (Serbia) Novak Djokovic (10) | 11 September 2023 | 9 June 2024 | 39 | 428^{‡} |

^{‡}Represents ATP rankings record.

== Significant achievements ==
- Most Open-Era Grand Slam semifinal meetings – 11.
- Most Open-Era Grand Slam hardcourt matches played – 11.
- Most Open-Era hardcourt meetings – 38.
- Most meetings at the US Open – 6.
- Most consecutive Open-Era meetings at one Grand Slam – 5 (2007–2011 at the US Open).
- Only two players to have more than one season winning three Grand Slams.
- Only two players to have more than one season playing four Grand Slam finals.
- Only two players to have five or more seasons playing four Grand Slam semifinals.
- Only two players to win at least 73 matches at each Grand Slam tournament. Djokovic – 90, Federer – 73.
- Only two players to reach at least 8 semifinals at each Grand Slam tournament. Djokovic – 12, Federer – 8.
- Only two players to reach at least 12 quarterfinals at each Grand Slam tournament. Djokovic – 13, Federer – 12.
- Only two players to achieve the "Sunshine Double" (Indian Wells and Miami Masters) at least three times. Djokovic – 4, Federer – 3.
- Only two players to win both Indian Wells and Miami Masters between them for 4 consecutive seasons (2014–2017).
- Only two players to achieve the "Sunshine Triple" (Australian Open, Indian Wells and Miami Masters) at least twice. Djokovic – 3, Federer – 2.
- First and second in Grand Slam finals reached. Djokovic – 37, Federer – 31.
- First and second in Grand Slam semifinals reached. Djokovic – 50, Federer – 46.
- First and second in Grand Slam quarterfinals reached. Djokovic – 61, Federer – 58.
- First and second in match wins at Grand Slam tournaments. Djokovic – 382, Federer – 369.
- First and second in match wins against top 10 opponents. Djokovic – 260, Federer – 224.
- First and second in match wins at Grand Slam tournaments on hard courts. Federer – 191, Djokovic – 189.
- Only two players to have a winning streak of at least 27 matches in Grand Slam tournaments. Djokovic – 4, Federer – 2.
- First and second in number of Major titles on hard courts. Djokovic – 14, Federer – 11.
- First and joint-second in number of Major titles on grass courts. Federer – 8, Djokovic – 7.
- First and second in number of Masters titles on hard courts. Djokovic – 29, Federer – 22.
- First and second in number of Australian Open titles in the Open Era. Djokovic – 10, Federer – 6.
- First and joint-second in number of Wimbledon Championships titles in the Open Era. Federer – 8, Djokovic – 7.
- First and second in number of Australian Open finals in the Open Era. Djokovic – 10, Federer – 7.
- First and second in number of Australian Open match wins in the Open Era. Federer – 102, Djokovic – 99.
- First and second in ATP Finals titles. Djokovic – 7, Federer – 6.
- Tied first in number of hardcourt titles overall, 71 each.
- First and second in number of hardcourt match wins. Federer – 783, Djokovic – 716.
- First and second in number of consecutive Grand Slam semi-finals. Federer – 23, Djokovic – 14.
- First and second in number of consecutive Grand Slam quarter-finals. Federer – 36, Djokovic – 28.
- Only two players to be seeded first at the Olympics more than once, with three times each.

== Performance timeline comparison ==
=== Grand Slam tournaments ===
Key
| **W** | F | SF | QF | #R | RR | Q# | DNQ | A | NH |

(W) winner; (F) finalist; (SF) semifinalist; (QF) quarterfinalist; (#R) rounds 4, 3, 2, 1; (RR) round-robin stage; (Q#) qualification round; (DNQ) did not qualify; (A) absent; (NH) not held; (SR) strike rate (events won / competed); (W–L) win–loss record.
To avoid confusion and double counting, these charts are updated at the conclusion of a tournament or when the player's participation has ended.
- **Bold** indicates players met during the tournament.

==== By year ====
===== 2005–2010 =====
| Player | 2005 | | | | 2006 | | | | 2007 | | | | 2008 | | | | 2009 | | | | 2010 | | | |
|---|---|---|---|---|---|---|---|---|---|---|---|---|---|---|---|---|---|---|---|---|---|---|---|---|
| Player | AUS | FRA | WIM | USA | AUS | FRA | WIM | USA | AUS | FRA | WIM | USA | AUS | FRA | WIM | USA | AUS | FRA | WIM | USA | AUS | FRA | WIM | USA |
| (Switzerland) Roger Federer | SF | SF | W | W | W | F | W | W | **W** | F | W | **W** | **SF** | F | F | **W** | F | W | W | **F** | W | QF | QF | **SF** |
| (Serbia) Novak Djokovic | 1R | 2R | 3R | 3R | 1R | QF | 4R | 3R | **4R** | SF | SF | **F** | **W** | SF | 2R | **SF** | QF | 3R | QF | **SF** | QF | QF | SF | **F** |

===== 2011–2016 =====
| Player | 2011 | | | | 2012 | | | | 2013 | | | | 2014 | | | | 2015 | | | | 2016 | | | |
|---|---|---|---|---|---|---|---|---|---|---|---|---|---|---|---|---|---|---|---|---|---|---|---|---|
| Player | AUS | FRA | WIM | USA | AUS | FRA | WIM | USA | AUS | FRA | WIM | USA | AUS | FRA | WIM | USA | AUS | FRA | WIM | USA | AUS | FRA | WIM | USA |
| (Switzerland) Roger Federer | **SF** | **F** | QF | **SF** | SF | **SF** | **W** | QF | SF | QF | 2R | 4R | SF | 4R | **F** | SF | 3R | QF | **F** | **F** | **SF** | A | SF | A |
| (Serbia) Novak Djokovic | **W** | **SF** | W | **W** | W | **F** | **SF** | F | W | SF | F | F | QF | F | **W** | SF | W | F | **W** | **W** | **W** | W | 3R | F |

==== 2017–2022 ====
| Player | 2017 | | | | 2018 | | | | 2019 | | | | 2020 | | | | 2021 | | | | 2022 | | | |
|---|---|---|---|---|---|---|---|---|---|---|---|---|---|---|---|---|---|---|---|---|---|---|---|---|
| Player | AUS | FRA | WIM | USA | AUS | FRA | WIM | USA | AUS | FRA | WIM | USA | AUS | WIM | USA | FRA | AUS | FRA | WIM | USA | AUS | FRA | WIM | USA |
| (Switzerland) Roger Federer | W | A | W | QF | W | A | QF | 4R | 4R | SF | **F** | QF | **SF** | NH | A | A | A | 4R | QF | A | A | A | A | A |
| (Serbia) Novak Djokovic | 2R | QF | QF | A | 4R | QF | W | W | W | SF | **W** | 4R | **W** | NH | 4R | F | W | W | W | F | A | QF | W | A |

==== By age (end of season) ====
===== 18–22 =====
| Player | 18 | | | | 19 | | | | 20 | | | | 21 | | | | 22 | | | |
|---|---|---|---|---|---|---|---|---|---|---|---|---|---|---|---|---|---|---|---|---|
| Player | AUS | FRA | WIM | USA | AUS | FRA | WIM | USA | AUS | FRA | WIM | USA | AUS | FRA | WIM | USA | AUS | FRA | WIM | USA |
| (Switzerland) Roger Federer | Q1 | 1R | 1R | Q2 | 3R | 4R | 1R | 3R | 3R | QF | QF | 4R | 4R | 1R | 1R | 4R | 4R | 1R | W | 4R |
| (Serbia) Novak Djokovic | 1R | 2R | 3R | 3R | 1R | QF | 4R | 3R | **4R** | SF | SF | **F** | **W** | SF | 2R | **SF** | QF | 3R | QF | **SF** |

===== 23–27 =====
| Player | 23 | | | | 24 | | | | 25 | | | | 26 | | | | 27 | | | |
|---|---|---|---|---|---|---|---|---|---|---|---|---|---|---|---|---|---|---|---|---|
| Player | AUS | FRA | WIM | USA | AUS | FRA | WIM | USA | AUS | FRA | WIM | USA | AUS | FRA | WIM | USA | AUS | FRA | WIM | USA |
| (Switzerland) Roger Federer | W | 3R | W | W | SF | SF | W | W | W | F | W | W | **W** | F | W | **W** | **SF** | F | F | **W** |
| (Serbia) Novak Djokovic | QF | QF | SF | **F** | **W** | **SF** | W | **W** | W | **F** | **SF** | F | W | SF | F | F | QF | F | **W** | SF |

===== 28–32 =====
| Player | 28 | | | | 29 | | | | 30 | | | | 31 | | | | 32 | | | |
|---|---|---|---|---|---|---|---|---|---|---|---|---|---|---|---|---|---|---|---|---|
| Player | AUS | FRA | WIM | USA | AUS | FRA | WIM | USA | AUS | FRA | WIM | USA | AUS | FRA | WIM | USA | AUS | FRA | WIM | USA |
| (Switzerland) Roger Federer | F | W | W | **F** | W | QF | QF | **SF** | **SF** | **F** | QF | **SF** | SF | **SF** | **W** | QF | SF | QF | 2R | 4R |
| (Serbia) Novak Djokovic | W | F | **W** | **W** | **W** | W | 3R | F | 2R | QF | QF | A | 4R | QF | W | W | W | SF | **W** | 4R |

===== 33–37 =====
| Player | 33 | | | | 34 | | | | 35 | | | | 36 | | | | 37 | | | |
|---|---|---|---|---|---|---|---|---|---|---|---|---|---|---|---|---|---|---|---|---|
| Player | AUS | FRA | WIM | USA | AUS | FRA | WIM | USA | AUS | FRA | WIM | USA | AUS | FRA | WIM | USA | AUS | FRA | WIM | USA |
| (Switzerland) Roger Federer | SF | 4R | **F** | SF | 3R | QF | **F** | **F** | **SF** | A | SF | A | W | A | W | QF | W | A | QF | 4R |
| (Serbia) Novak Djokovic | **W** | F | NH | 4R | W | W | W | F | A | QF | W | A | W | W | F | W | SF | QF | F | 3R |

===== 38–41 =====
| Player | 38 | | | | 39 | | | | 40 | | | | 41 | | | |
|---|---|---|---|---|---|---|---|---|---|---|---|---|---|---|---|---|
| Player | AUS | FRA | WIM | USA | AUS | FRA | WIM | USA | AUS | FRA | WIM | USA | AUS | FRA | WIM | USA |
| (Switzerland) Roger Federer | 4R | SF | **F** | QF | **SF** | A | NH | A | A | 4R | QF | A | A | A | A | A |
| (Serbia) Novak Djokovic | SF | SF | SF | SF | F | 3R | SF | 1R | | | | | | | | |

=== ATP rankings ===
==== Year-end ranking timeline ====
| Player | 1998 | 1999 | 2000 | 2001 | 2002 | 2003 | 2004 | 2005 | 2006 | 2007 | 2008 | 2009 | 2010 | 2011 | 2012 | 2013 | 2014 | 2015 | 2016 | 2017 | 2018 | 2019 | 2020 | 2021 | 2022 | 2023 | 2024 | 2025 | 2026 |
|---|---|---|---|---|---|---|---|---|---|---|---|---|---|---|---|---|---|---|---|---|---|---|---|---|---|---|---|---|---|
| (Switzerland) Roger Federer | 301 | 64 | 29 | 13 | 6 | 2 | **1** | **1** | **1** | **1** | 2 | **1** | 2 | 3 | 2 | 6 | 2 | 3 | 16 | 2 | 3 | 3 | 5 | 16 | 97 | retired | | | |
| (Serbia) Novak Djokovic | | | | | | 679 | 186 | 78 | 16 | 3 | 3 | 3 | 3 | **1** | **1** | 2 | **1** | **1** | 2 | 12 | **1** | 2 | **1** | **1** | 5 | **1** | 7 | 4 | |

==== ATP Year-end ranking timeline by age ====
| Year-End Ranking | 17 | 18 | 19 | 20 | 21 | 22 | 23 | 24 | 25 | 26 | 27 | 28 | 29 | 30 | 31 | 32 | 33 | 34 | 35 | 36 | 37 | 38 | 39 | 40 | 41 |
|---|---|---|---|---|---|---|---|---|---|---|---|---|---|---|---|---|---|---|---|---|---|---|---|---|---|
| (Switzerland) Roger Federer | 301 | 64 | 29 | 13 | 6 | 2 | **1** | **1** | **1** | **1** | 2 | **1** | 2 | 3 | 2 | 6 | 2 | 3 | 16 | 2 | 3 | 3 | 5 | 16 | 97 |
| (Serbia) Novak Djokovic | 186 | 78 | 16 | 3 | 3 | 3 | 3 | **1** | **1** | 2 | **1** | **1** | 2 | 12 | **1** | 2 | **1** | **1** | 5 | **1** | 7 | 4 | | | |

On 23 September 2022, Federer retired from professional tennis at the 2022 Laver Cup. He played this last ATP event with protected ranking 9, however he was last ranked 97 at the starting week of 2022 Wimbledon in the ATP rankings.

== Career evolution ==
Federer and Djokovic were born about six years apart. Federer's birthday is 8 August 1981, while Djokovic's is 22 May 1987. A different viewpoint of their career evolution is offered by taking the season they entered with an age of 17 as starting point. For instance, in 2004 Federer started the season being 22 years old. At the end of that season, he accumulated a total of four Grand Slam titles and 22 singles titles, with a year-end ranking of 1. By comparison, Djokovic finished the 2010 season also aged 23 years old, having won a total of 1 grand slam title and 18 total singles titles, with a year-end ranking of 3. Federer played his last singles match in 2021.

- updated 2 February 2026.

| Age (end of season) | | 18 | 19 | 20 | 21 | 22 | 23 | 24 | 25 | 26 | 27 | 28 | 29 | 30 | 31 | 32 | 33 | 34 | 35 | 36 | 37 | 38 | 39 | 40 |
| (Switzerland) Federer's season | | 1999 | 2000 | 2001 | 2002 | 2003 | 2004 | 2005 | 2006 | 2007 | 2008 | 2009 | 2010 | 2011 | 2012 | 2013 | 2014 | 2015 | 2016 | 2017 | 2018 | 2019 | 2020 | 2021 |
| (Serbia) Djokovic's season | | 2005 | 2006 | 2007 | 2008 | 2009 | 2010 | 2011 | 2012 | 2013 | 2014 | 2015 | 2016 | 2017 | 2018 | 2019 | 2020 | 2021 | 2022 | 2023 | 2024 | 2025 | 2026 | 2027 |
|---|---|---|---|---|---|---|---|---|---|---|---|---|---|---|---|---|---|---|---|---|---|---|---|---|
| Grand Slam titles | Federer | 0 | 0 | 0 | 0 | 1 | 4 | 6 | 9 | 12 | 13 | 15 | 16 | 16 | 17 | 17 | 17 | 17 | 17 | 19 | 20 | 20 | 20 | 20 |
| Grand Slam titles | Djokovic | 0 | 0 | 0 | 1 | 1 | 1 | 4 | 5 | 6 | 7 | 10 | 12 | 12 | 14 | 16 | 17 | 20 | 21 | 24 | 24 | 24 | (24) | |
| Grand Slam finals | Federer | 0 | 0 | 0 | 0 | 1 | 4 | 6 | 10 | 14 | 17 | 21 | 22 | 23 | 24 | 24 | 25 | 27 | 27 | 29 | 30 | 31 | 31 | 31 |
| Grand Slam finals | Djokovic | 0 | 0 | 1 | 2 | 2 | 3 | 6 | 9 | 12 | 14 | 18 | 21 | 21 | 23 | 25 | 27 | 31 | 32 | 36 | 37 | 37 | (38) | |
| Grand Slam match wins | Federer | 0 | 7 | 20 | 26 | 39 | 61 | 85 | 112 | 138 | 162 | 188 | 208 | 228 | 247 | 260 | 279 | 297 | 307 | 325 | 339 | 357 | 362 | 369 |
| Grand Slam match wins | Djokovic | 5 | 14 | 33 | 51 | 66 | 85 | 110 | 134 | 158 | 180 | 207 | 228 | 237 | 258 | 280 | 296 | 323 | 334 | 361 | 377 | 397 | (402) | |
| ATP Finals titles | Federer | 0 | 0 | 0 | 0 | 1 | 2 | 2 | 3 | 4 | 4 | 4 | 5 | 6 | 6 | 6 | 6 | 6 | 6 | 6 | 6 | 6 | 6 | 6 |
| ATP Finals titles | Djokovic | 0 | 0 | 0 | 1 | 1 | 1 | 1 | 2 | 3 | 4 | 5 | 5 | 5 | 5 | 5 | 5 | 5 | 6 | 7 | 7 | 7 | (7) | |
| ATP Masters titles | Federer | 0 | 0 | 0 | 1 | 1 | 4 | 8 | 12 | 14 | 14 | 16 | 17 | 18 | 21 | 21 | 23 | 24 | 24 | 27 | 27 | 28 | 28 | 28 |
| ATP Masters titles | Djokovic | 0 | 0 | 2 | 4 | 5 | 5 | 10 | 13 | 16 | 20 | 26 | 30 | 30 | 32 | 34 | 36 | 37 | 38 | 40 | 40 | 40 | (40) | |
| Total titles | Federer | 0 | 0 | 1 | 4 | 11 | 22 | 33 | 45 | 53 | 57 | 61 | 66 | 70 | 76 | 77 | 82 | 88 | 88 | 95 | 99 | 103 | 103 | 103 |
| Total titles | Djokovic | 0 | 2 | 7 | 11 | 16 | 18 | 28 | 34 | 41 | 48 | 59 | 66 | 68 | 72 | 77 | 81 | 86 | 91 | 98 | 99 | 101 | (101) | |
| Total match wins | Federer | 15 | 51 | 100 | 158 | 236 | 310 | 391 | 483 | 551 | 617 | 678 | 743 | 807 | 878 | 923 | 996 | 1059 | 1080 | 1134 | 1184 | 1237 | 1242 | 1251 |
| Total match wins | Djokovic | 13 | 53 | 121 | 185 | 263 | 324 | 394 | 469 | 543 | 604 | 686 | 751 | 783 | 836 | 893 | 934 | 989 | 1031 | 1087 | 1124 | 1163 | (1168) | |
| Ranking | Federer | 64 | 29 | 13 | 6 | 2 | 1 | 1 | 1 | 1 | 2 | 1 | 2 | 3 | 2 | 6 | 2 | 3 | 16 | 2 | 3 | 3 | 5 | 16 |
| Ranking | Djokovic | 78 | 16 | 3 | 3 | 3 | 3 | 1 | 1 | 2 | 1 | 1 | 2 | 12 | 1 | 2 | 1 | 1 | 5 | 1 | 7 | 4 | (3) | |
| Weeks at No. 1 | Federer | 0 | 0 | 0 | 0 | 0 | 48 | 100 | 152 | 204 | 237 | 262 | 285 | 285 | 302 | 302 | 302 | 302 | 302 | 302 | 310 | 310 | 310 | 310 |
| Weeks at No. 1 | Djokovic | 0 | 0 | 0 | 0 | 0 | 0 | 26 | 62 | 101 | 127 | 179 | 223 | 223 | 232 | 275 | 301 | 353 | 373 | 405 | 428 | 428 | (428) | |

== See also ==
- Big Three
- List of tennis rivalries
- Federer–Nadal rivalry
- Djokovic–Nadal rivalry
- Djokovic–Murray rivalry
- Roger Federer career statistics
- Novak Djokovic career statistics
- List of Grand Slam men's singles champions
