= 2014 Wimbledon Championships – Men's singles final =

Tennis match; Djokovic def. Federer

Wimbledon 2014 Men's Final
- (Serbia) Novak Djokovic (1) vs. (Switzerland) Roger Federer (4)
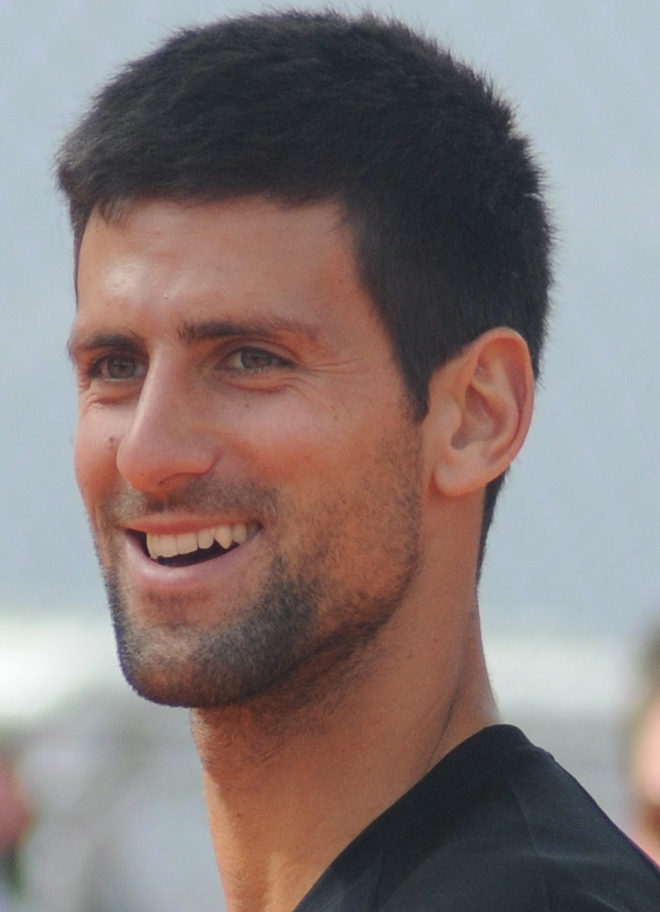
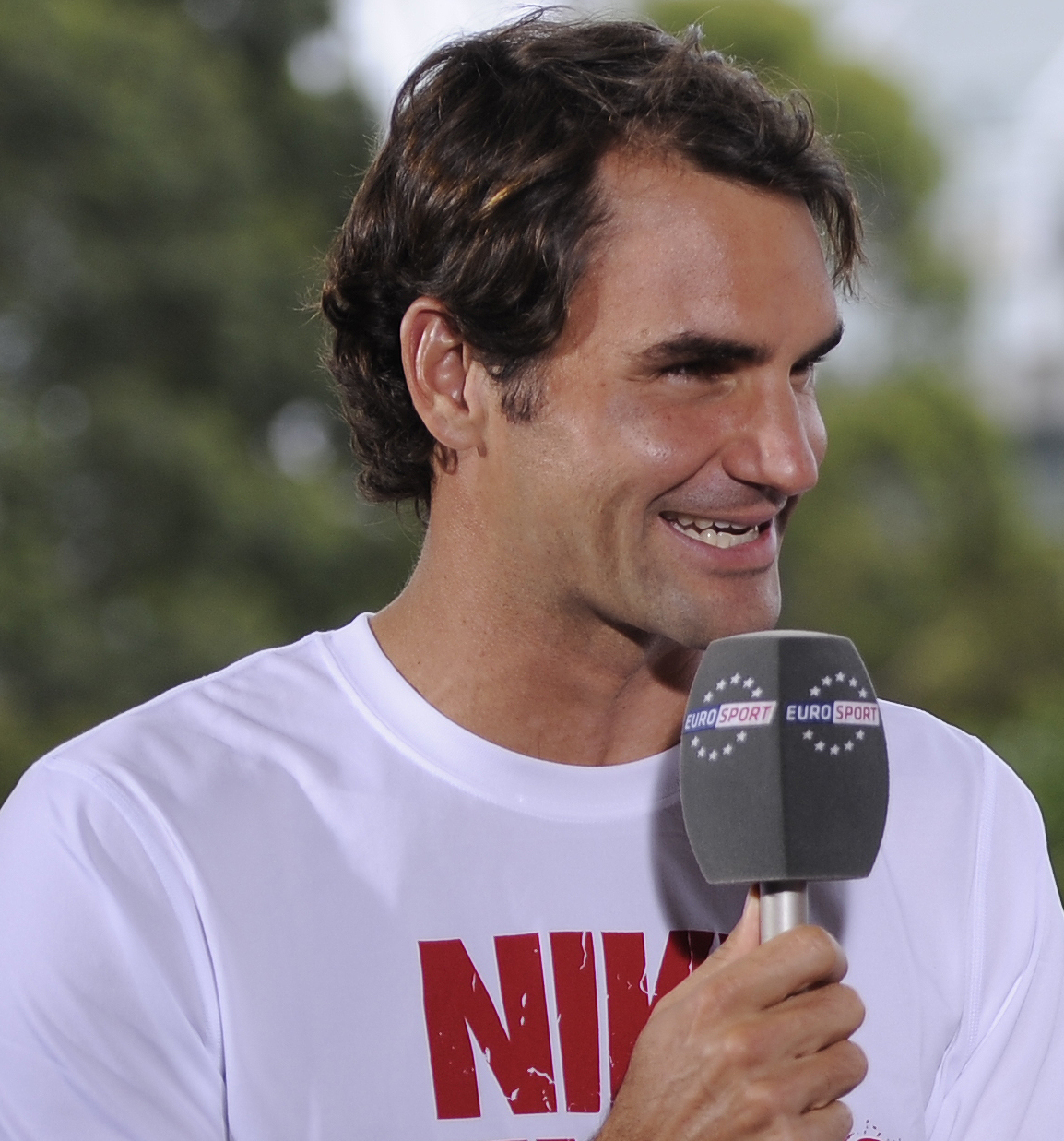
- Novak Djokovic (left) and Roger Federer (right)
Set	1	2	3	4	5
(Serbia) Novak Djokovic	6^{7}	6	7^{7}	5	6
(Switzerland) Roger Federer	7^{9}	4	6^{4}	7	4
- Date: Sunday, 6 July 2014
- Tournament: The Championships, Wimbledon
- Location: Centre Court, All England Lawn Tennis and Croquet Club, Wimbledon, London, England
- Chair umpire: James Keothavong
- Duration: 3 hours 56 minutes

The 2014 Wimbledon Championships Men's Singles final was the championship tennis match of the Men's Singles tournament at the 2014 Wimbledon Championships. A significant part of the Djokovic–Federer rivalry, it pitted Novak Djokovic and Roger Federer against each other in a Grand Slam final for the second time. The match marks the only time that Federer lost a Wimbledon final after winning the first set.

After 3 hours and 56 minutes, top seed Djokovic defeated fourth-seeded Federer in five sets to win the match. By winning the 2014 Wimbledon Championships, Djokovic not only won for the second time, but also reclaimed the world number one ranking from Rafael Nadal at the conclusion of the tournament.

== Background ==
The match took place on the final day of the 2014 edition of the 13-day Wimbledon Championships, held every June and July. Novak Djokovic was world number two entering Wimbledon, but was seeded first ahead of Rafael Nadal due to Wimbledon employing a grass-court seeding system that took into account recent results on grass. Djokovic had reached the semifinals in 2012 and final in 2013, whilst Nadal had fallen in the second and first rounds respectively. Roger Federer, on the other hand, entered the Championships ranked and seeded fourth, and reached the final after having been upset by Sergiy Stakhovsky in the second round in 2013.

Djokovic had to overcome numerous tough matches to reach the final: he was almost pushed to five sets by Radek Štěpánek in the second round, was two sets to one down against Marin Čilić in the quarterfinals before rallying to win in five sets and also required four sets to defeat Grigor Dimitrov in the semifinals. By contrast, Federer only dropped a set (and his own serve) once to reach the final, in the quarterfinals against Stan Wawrinka.

Going into the final, Federer had not contested a major final since two years prior when he won Wimbledon in 2012. In 2013, affected by back troubles, Federer had failed to reach any of the major finals for the first time since 2002 and some commentators doubted whether he would ever contest a major final again. When asked if he felt that he could still win a major, Federer responded, "I'm just really pleased that I'm back strong at Wimbledon. Last year I didn't even come close. I was very deflated leaving Wimbledon on that note. I'm happy I'm sort of physically back where I can put myself in contention." Upon reaching the final, Federer was bidding to win his 80th career title, 18th major overall and eighth Wimbledon title, which would have broken the record that he shared with Pete Sampras for the most Wimbledon men's singles titles at seven.

Djokovic too had not won a major since the 2013 Australian Open over a year and a half prior, and was going into the final having lost five of the previous six major finals he had contested. He entered the championship match looking for his second Wimbledon title after winning in 2011, and was seeking redemption after losing in the previous year's final to Andy Murray. Djokovic stated, "There is plenty of motivation from my side to win this Grand Slam final after losing last three out of four. [sic] It would mean a lot mentally for me." As a result of the circumstances, both men relished the challenge and were focused on playing a high-quality match.

== Match ==
Novak Djokovic won the coin toss and elected to serve first. The first set saw neither player force a break point, though there were a few games that went to deuce. A tiebreak was required to decide the first set and it saw Federer come from two separate set points down to take it 9–7. At 51 minutes, the first set alone lasted just four minutes less than the entire women's singles final.

Despite falling early in the second set, Djokovic managed to break Federer's serve early in the third game. The set remained on serve from there and Djokovic leveled the match at one-set all. The lone break of serve in the second set was only the second time all tournament that Federer had been broken. The third set followed a similar pattern to that of the first; again a tiebreak was required to decide it as neither man would yield his serve, and it was Djokovic who would win the set and go two-sets-to-one up. After three sets, neither man was giving anything away as the unforced errors remained very low. Federer's serving kept him in the match but he had still been unable to gain even a single break point opportunity as Djokovic's own serving display continued to hold up strong.

In the fourth set, Djokovic again broke early to lead 3–1. From there, Federer broke Djokovic's serve for the first time in match to get back on serve at 3–2; only to be broken again in his service game which saw Djokovic regain the lead at 4–2. Djokovic consolidated his break this time to take a commanding 5–2 lead and was a game away from the title, leaving Federer to serve to stay in the match. After Federer held serve in the eighth game, Djokovic served for the win at 5–3 and seemed poised to win the title in four sets. Federer would come back from the brink of defeat to break Djokovic for the second time and put the set back on serve. Then, in the tenth game, Djokovic earned a championship point, which Federer saved with an ace which was initially called out but ruled in after a successful challenge by the Hawk-Eye review system. Federer then levelled the set at 5–5 and from there, he broke Djokovic again for the third time in the set and then held his serve to win five games in a row and claim the fourth set 7–5. The Wimbledon final went to a fifth set for the first time since 2009.

Djokovic served to begin the fifth. Both men held serve comfortably until 3–3, when Federer was able to muster a break point but could not convert it after a long rally. Djokovic was able to hold and go ahead 4–3, and in the next game, found himself at 15–40 with 2 break points. Federer fought them off to level the match at 4–4. In the next game, Federer sent an overhead smash into the net that would have given him a 15–30 opening had he made it. Djokovic pounced on the error to hold serve and go ahead 5–4. Finally in the tenth game, Djokovic earned another two championship points after Federer sent a forehand long at 15–30. There was no ace this time as Federer faulted on championship point and was forced into a second serve. Djokovic took control of the ensuing rally and won Wimbledon after Federer netted a backhand to conclude the contest.

=== Officials ===
The chair umpire throughout the match was British official James Keothavong. He umpired his first ever Grand Slam singles final.

=== Reaction ===
Lasting for 3 hours and 56 minutes, the match was played at a relatively fast pace with both players serving well until the final game. Many rallies in the contest went over 20 shots. During the third set, Djokovic went over 30 minutes without hitting a single error.

Federer's winners to unforced errors differential was +46, while Djokovic's was +41. Djokovic said "Sincerely, this has been the best quality Grand Slam final that I have ever been part of. I've had a longest final against Nadal in the Australian Open, but quality-wise from the first to last point, this is definitely the best match. It's the most special Grand Slam final I've played."

Federer said "It was a great match and I enjoyed being a part of it. Winning or losing, it's always something special in the Wimbledon final and something you'll remember, even more so when the match was as dramatic as it was today. I'm very pleased with the way things went throughout the match. It was a high-quality match and it was good stuff from both players. Clearly we both walk away happy from here. I mean, him more happy than I am. But still, I'm happy overall."

Retired tennis player Jimmy Connors was present for the match as a commentator for BBC Sport. Connors said "I loved this match because there was more to it than just tennis. For four hours neither player wanted to give an inch. Sometimes there's a lull in matches that go five sets, but I didn't think there was a lull today at all. Both players came out and gave it the punch right from the start. It was one of those days when you say, "I'm happy to be here just to see this."

== Statistics ==
Category	Djokovic	Federer
1st serve %	108 of 174 = 62%	133 of 192 = 69%
1st serve points won	79 of 108 = 73%	102 of 133 = 77%
2nd serve points won	43 of 66 = 65%	26 of 59 = 44%
Aces	13	29
Double faults	3	5
Winners	68	75
Unforced errors	27	29
Winners-UFE	+41	+46
Return games won	4	3
Break point conversions	4 of 15 = 27%	3 of 7 = 43%
Receiving points won	64 of 192 = 33%	52 of 174 = 30%
Total points won	186	180

_{Source}

== Significance ==
- This was the first Grand Slam final since the 2009 US Open not to feature either Andy Murray or Rafael Nadal.
- By defeating Roger Federer in the final, Novak Djokovic became the third man, after Nadal and Juan Martín del Potro, to defeat Federer in a Grand Slam final, and the second after Nadal to defeat Federer in a Wimbledon final.
- In his nine Wimbledon finals until 2014, Federer only lost two of them. Both of them required a fifth and deciding set in order for his opponent to defeat him, and in both matches Federer had to save a match point in the fourth set. Both of those finals ended in similar fashion with Federer hitting the ball into the net. In 2008, the match ended when Federer netted a forehand after the ball took an awkward bounce. In 2014, the match ended when Federer netted a backhand hit from an awkward position.
- With this win, Djokovic became the only man to beat Federer at least once at every Grand Slam tournament. Likewise, Federer is the only player who has beaten Djokovic at every Grand Slam event, having achieved that feat at the 2012 Wimbledon Championships.
- With the loss, the match marks the only time Federer lost a final at Wimbledon after having won the first set.

== See also ==
- Djokovic–Federer rivalry
