= 2017 Australian Open – Women's singles qualifying =

Women's singles qualifying
- 2017 Australian Open

Events
Singles	men	women		boys	girls
Doubles	men	women	mixed	boys	girls
WC Singles	men	women	quad
WC Doubles	men	women	quad
Legends	men	women	mixed

Qualification
Singles	men	women
- Australian Open

This article displays the qualifying draw for women's singles at the 2017 Australian Open.

== Draw ==
=== Seeds ===
1. (Switzerland) Stefanie Vögele (qualified)
2. (Germany) Tatjana Maria (second round)
3. (Chinese Taipei) Chang Kai-chen (second round)
4. (United States) Jennifer Brady (qualified)
5. (Belarus) Aliaksandra Sasnovich (qualified)
6. (United States) Julia Boserup (qualified)
7. (Slovakia) Rebecca Šramková (qualified)
8. (Belgium) Maryna Zanevska (qualifying competition, lucky loser)
9. (Serbia) Nina Stojanović (first round)
10. (Spain) Sílvia Soler Espinosa (first round)
11. (Romania) Ana Bogdan (qualified)
12. (China) Zhu Lin (qualified)
13. (Russia) Natalia Vikhlyantseva (qualified)
14. (United States) Taylor Townsend (qualifying competition)
15. (Netherlands) Richèl Hogenkamp (first round)
16. (Bulgaria) Elitsa Kostova (first round)
17. (Serbia) Aleksandra Krunić (second round)
18. (United States) Sachia Vickery (first round)
19. (China) Zhang Kailin (qualifying competition)
20. (Bulgaria) Isabella Shinikova (first round)
21. (Netherlands) Cindy Burger (first round)
22. (China) Liu Fangzhou (qualifying competition)
23. (South Korea) Jang Su-jeong (second round)
24. (Russia) Elizaveta Kulichkova (qualified)

=== Qualifiers ===
1. (Switzerland) Stefanie Vögele
2. (Russia) Anna Blinkova
3. (Russia) Natalia Vikhlyantseva
4. (United States) Jennifer Brady
5. (Belarus) Aliaksandra Sasnovich
6. (United States) Julia Boserup
7. (Slovakia) Rebecca Šramková
8. (Germany) Mona Barthel
9. (Japan) Eri Hozumi
10. (Russia) Elizaveta Kulichkova
11. (Romania) Ana Bogdan
12. (China) Zhu Lin

=== Lucky loser ===
1. (Belgium) Maryna Zanevska

=== Draw ===
==== First qualifier ====
First round
1	(Switzerland) Stefanie Vögele	7^{7}	3	6
(Russia) Anna Kalinskaya	6^{3}	6	3
WC	(Australia) Abbie Myers	4	6	1
(Switzerland) Amra Sadiković	6	3	6
(United Kingdom) Tara Moore	7^{7}	3	1
(Hungary) Dalma Gálfi	6^{2}	6	6
(North Macedonia) Lina Gjorcheska	6	3	6
18	(United States) Sachia Vickery	2	6	3

Second round
1	(Switzerland) Stefanie Vögele	6	6^{6}	6
(Switzerland) Amra Sadiković	1	7^{8}	2
(Hungary) Dalma Gálfi	1	1
(North Macedonia) Lina Gjorcheska	6	6

Qualifying competition
1	(Switzerland) Stefanie Vögele	4	6	6
(North Macedonia) Lina Gjorcheska	6	3	2

==== Second qualifier ====
First round
2	(Germany) Tatjana Maria	6	6
PR	(Russia) Ksenia Pervak	1	2
(Russia) Anastasiya Komardina	6	6
(Switzerland) Jil Teichmann	1	4
(Bulgaria) Sesil Karatantcheva	3	2
(Russia) Anna Blinkova	6	6
(Netherlands) Lesley Kerkhove	3	2
17	(Serbia) Aleksandra Krunić	6	6

Second round
2	(Germany) Tatjana Maria	2	5
(Russia) Anastasiya Komardina	6	7
(Russia) Anna Blinkova	6	6
17	(Serbia) Aleksandra Krunić	2	1

Qualifying competition
(Russia) Anastasiya Komardina	4	2
(Russia) Anna Blinkova	6	6

==== Third qualifier ====
First round
3	(Chinese Taipei) Chang Kai-chen	1	6	6
(Austria) Barbara Haas	6	1	2
(Russia) Veronika Kudermetova	4	6	3
(Uzbekistan) Sabina Sharipova	6	3	6
PR	(Netherlands) Michaëlla Krajicek	6	6
(Netherlands) Quirine Lemoine	2	0
(Slovakia) Daniela Hantuchová	1	3
13	(Russia) Natalia Vikhlyantseva	6	6

Second round
3	(Chinese Taipei) Chang Kai-chen	7	1	5
(Uzbekistan) Sabina Sharipova	5	6	7
PR	(Netherlands) Michaëlla Krajicek	2	3
13	(Russia) Natalia Vikhlyantseva	6	6

Qualifying competition
(Uzbekistan) Sabina Sharipova	2	5
13	(Russia) Natalia Vikhlyantseva	6	7

==== Fourth qualifier ====
First round
4	(United States) Jennifer Brady	6	6^{6}	6
(Russia) Viktoria Kamenskaya	2	7^{8}	3
(Czech Republic) Barbora Štefková	6	6
(France) Alizé Lim	3	0
(Canada) Françoise Abanda	3	6	6
WC	(Australia) Storm Sanders	6	2	1
(Czech Republic) Tereza Smitková	0	6^{2}
14	(United States) Taylor Townsend	6	7^{7}

Second round
4	(United States) Jennifer Brady	6^{2}	6	6
(Czech Republic) Barbora Štefková	7^{7}	4	1
(Canada) Françoise Abanda	4	4
14	(United States) Taylor Townsend	6	6

Qualifying competition
4	(United States) Jennifer Brady	2	6	6
14	(United States) Taylor Townsend	6	4	3

==== Fifth qualifier ====
First round
5	(Belarus) Aliaksandra Sasnovich	2	6	6
(Japan) Riko Sawayanagi	6	2	2
(Switzerland) Conny Perrin	4	4
(Brazil) Paula Cristina Gonçalves	6	6
(Belarus) Aryna Sabalenka	6	6
(Turkey) İpek Soylu	2	1
(South Korea) Han Na-lae	4	4
22	(China) Liu Fangzhou	6	6

Second round
5	(Belarus) Aliaksandra Sasnovich	4	6	6
(Brazil) Paula Cristina Gonçalves	6	1	3
(Belarus) Aryna Sabalenka	5	6	4
22	(China) Liu Fangzhou	7	3	6

Qualifying competition
5	(Belarus) Aliaksandra Sasnovich	6	6
22	(China) Liu Fangzhou	4	0

==== Sixth qualifier ====
First round
6	(United States) Julia Boserup	6	6
PR	(Japan) Ayumi Morita	1	2
(Israel) Julia Glushko	6	7^{7}
(Czech Republic) Tereza Martincová	2	6^{3}
PR	(Romania) Mihaela Buzărnescu	7	5	6
(Belarus) Olga Govortsova	5	7	2
WC	(Australia) Olivia Rogowska	2	6	11
21	(Netherlands) Cindy Burger	6	2	9

Second round
6	(United States) Julia Boserup	6	3	6
(Israel) Julia Glushko	2	6	2
PR	(Romania) Mihaela Buzărnescu	2	6	2
WC	(Australia) Olivia Rogowska	6	3	6

Qualifying competition
6	(United States) Julia Boserup	6	6
WC	(Australia) Olivia Rogowska	2	1

==== Seventh qualifier ====
First round
7	(Slovakia) Rebecca Šramková	6	6
(Italy) Jasmine Paolini	3	4
(Japan) Shuko Aoyama	4	4
(United States) Jamie Loeb	6	6
(France) Virginie Razzano	6	6
WC	(Canada) Aleksandra Wozniak	4	1
(Bulgaria) Aleksandrina Naydenova	1	1
23	(South Korea) Jang Su-jeong	6	6

Second round
7	(Slovakia) Rebecca Šramková	4	7	6
(United States) Jamie Loeb	6	5	2
(France) Virginie Razzano	6	7^{7}
23	(South Korea) Jang Su-jeong	2	6^{5}

Qualifying competition
7	(Slovakia) Rebecca Šramková	6	7
(France) Virginie Razzano	3	5

==== Eighth qualifier ====
First round
8	(Belgium) Maryna Zanevska	5	7^{7}	6
(Russia) Anastasia Pivovarova	7	6^{2}	3
(Russia) Ksenia Lykina	4	7^{7}	7
WC	(Australia) Naiktha Bains	6	6^{3}	5
(Japan) Miyu Kato	3	1
(Brazil) Teliana Pereira	6	6
(Germany) Mona Barthel	6	6
15	(Netherlands) Richèl Hogenkamp	2	1

Second round
8	(Belgium) Maryna Zanevska	6	6
(Russia) Ksenia Lykina	4	4
(Brazil) Teliana Pereira	0	4
(Germany) Mona Barthel	6	6

Qualifying competition
8	(Belgium) Maryna Zanevska	4	3
(Germany) Mona Barthel	6	6

==== Ninth qualifier ====
First round
9	(Serbia) Nina Stojanović	6	2	0
(Greece) Valentini Grammatikopoulou	3	6	6
(Japan) Eri Hozumi	6	6
(Slovenia) Tamara Zidanšek	3	2
(Bulgaria) Viktoriya Tomova	6	7
(Serbia) Ivana Jorović	3	5
(Japan) Hiroko Kuwata	6	6
20	(Bulgaria) Isabella Shinikova	3	3

Second round
(Greece) Valentini Grammatikopoulou	1	1
(Japan) Eri Hozumi	6	6
(Bulgaria) Viktoriya Tomova	7	6
(Japan) Hiroko Kuwata	5	3

Qualifying competition
(Japan) Eri Hozumi	7	6
(Bulgaria) Viktoriya Tomova	5	2

==== Tenth qualifier ====
First round
10	(Spain) Sílvia Soler Espinosa	3	0
(United States) Bethanie Mattek-Sands	6	6
(France) Amandine Hesse	6	6
(United Kingdom) Laura Robson	2	4
(Czech Republic) Lucie Hradecká	7^{7}	6
(Germany) Antonia Lottner	6^{3}	4
(Argentina) Nadia Podoroska	3	6	1^{r}
24	(Russia) Elizaveta Kulichkova	6	3	4

Second round
(United States) Bethanie Mattek-Sands	6	5	10
(France) Amandine Hesse	1	7	8
(Czech Republic) Lucie Hradecká	3	5
24	(Russia) Elizaveta Kulichkova	6	7

Qualifying competition
(United States) Bethanie Mattek-Sands	2	3
24	(Russia) Elizaveta Kulichkova	6	6

==== Eleventh qualifier ====
First round
11	(Romania) Ana Bogdan	3	6	6
(Netherlands) Arantxa Rus	6	1	4
WC	(Australia) Ellen Perez	6	1	7
(Slovenia) Tadeja Majerič	3	6	5
(Czech Republic) Barbora Krejčíková	6	4	6
(United States) Asia Muhammad	3	6	2
(Uzbekistan) Nigina Abduraimova	6	6^{5}	3
19	(China) Zhang Kailin	4	7^{7}	6

Second round
11	(Romania) Ana Bogdan	6	7^{9}
WC	(Australia) Ellen Perez	2	6^{7}
(Czech Republic) Barbora Krejčíková	3	5
19	(China) Zhang Kailin	6	7

Qualifying competition
11	(Romania) Ana Bogdan	7^{7}	2	6
19	(China) Zhang Kailin	6^{3}	6	2

==== Twelfth qualifier ====
First round
12	(China) Zhu Lin	6	6
WC	(Australia) Tammi Patterson	2	1
(United States) Jennifer Elie	6	7
(Argentina) Catalina Pella	1	5
(Slovenia) Dalila Jakupović	6	6^{5}	5
(Tunisia) Ons Jabeur	2	7^{7}	7
WC	(Belarus) Vera Lapko	6	5	8
16	(Bulgaria) Elitsa Kostova	1	7	6

Second round
12	(China) Zhu Lin	7^{7}	6
(United States) Jennifer Elie	6^{2}	2
(Tunisia) Ons Jabeur	7	3	6
WC	(Belarus) Vera Lapko	5	6	3

Qualifying competition
12	(China) Zhu Lin	7^{7}	6
(Tunisia) Ons Jabeur	6^{4}	4
