= 2017 Australian Open – Day-by-day summaries =

== Day 1 (16 January) ==
- Seeds out:
  - Men's Singles: (France) Lucas Pouille [16], (Uruguay) Pablo Cuevas [22], (Spain) Albert Ramos Viñolas [26]
  - Women's Singles: (Romania) Simona Halep [4], (Italy) Roberta Vinci [15], (Netherlands) Kiki Bertens [19], (Russia) Daria Kasatkina [23], (Germany) Laura Siegemund [26]
- Schedule of Play

Matches on main courts
Matches on Rod Laver Arena
Event	Winner	Loser	Score
Women's Singles 1st Round	(United States) Shelby Rogers	(Romania) Simona Halep [4]	6–3, 6–1
Women's Singles 1st Round	(United States) Venus Williams [13]	(Ukraine) Kateryna Kozlova	7–6^{(7–5)}, 7–5
Men's Singles 1st Round	(United Kingdom) Andy Murray [1]	(Ukraine) Illya Marchenko	7–5, 7–6^{(7–5)}, 6–2
Women's Singles 1st Round	(Germany) Angelique Kerber [1]	(Ukraine) Lesia Tsurenko	6–2, 5–7, 6–2
Men's Singles 1st Round	(Switzerland) Roger Federer [17]	(Austria) Jürgen Melzer [Q]	7–5, 3–6, 6–2, 6–2
Matches on Margaret Court Arena
Event	Winner	Loser	Score
Women's Singles 1st Round	(Spain) Garbiñe Muguruza [7]	(New Zealand) Marina Erakovic	7–5, 6–4
Men's Singles 1st Round	(Australia) Bernard Tomic [27]	(Brazil) Thomaz Bellucci	6–2, 6–1, 6–4
Women's Singles 1st Round	(United States) Coco Vandeweghe	(Italy) Roberta Vinci [15]	6–1, 7–6^{(7–3)}
Men's Singles 1st Round	(Switzerland) Stan Wawrinka [4]	(Slovakia) Martin Kližan	4–6, 6–4, 7–5, 4–6, 6–4
Women's Singles 1st Round	(Canada) Eugenie Bouchard	(United States) Louisa Chirico	6–0, 6–4
Matches on Hisense Arena
Event	Winner	Loser	Score
Men's Singles 1st Round	(Japan) Kei Nishikori [5]	(Russia) Andrey Kuznetsov	5–7, 6–1, 6–4, 6–7^{(6–8)}, 6–2
Women's Singles 1st Round	(Australia) Ashleigh Barty [WC]	(Germany) Annika Beck	6–4, 7–5
Women's Singles 1st Round	(Russia) Svetlana Kuznetsova [8]	(Colombia) Mariana Duque Mariño	6–0, 6–1
Men's Singles 1st Round	(Australia) Nick Kyrgios [14]	(Portugal) Gastão Elias	6–1, 6–2, 6–2
Colored background indicates a night match
Day matches began at 11:00 am local time, whilst night matches began at 7:00 pm local time.

== Day 2 (17 January) ==
- Seeds out:
  - Men's Singles: (Spain) Feliciano López [28]
  - Women's Singles: (Australia) Samantha Stosur [18], (Hungary) Tímea Babos [25]
- Schedule of Play

Matches on main courts
Matches on Rod Laver Arena
Event	Winner	Loser	Score
Women's Singles 1st Round	(Czech Republic) Karolína Plíšková [5]	(Spain) Sara Sorribes Tormo	6–2, 6–0
Women's Singles 1st Round	(United States) Serena Williams [2]	(Switzerland) Belinda Bencic	6–4, 6–3
Men's Singles 1st Round	(Spain) Rafael Nadal [9]	(Germany) Florian Mayer	6–3, 6–4, 6–4
Men's Singles 1st Round	(Serbia) Novak Djokovic [2]	(Spain) Fernando Verdasco	6–1, 7–6^{(7–4)}, 6–2
Women's Singles 1st Round	(Poland) Agnieszka Radwańska [3]	(Bulgaria) Tsvetana Pironkova	6–1, 4–6, 6–1
Matches on Margaret Court Arena
Event	Winner	Loser	Score
Women's Singles 1st Round	(United Kingdom) Johanna Konta [9]	(Belgium) Kirsten Flipkens	7–5, 6–2
Men's Singles 1st Round	(Canada) Milos Raonic [3]	(Germany) Dustin Brown	6–3, 6–4, 6–2
Women's Singles 1st Round	(United Kingdom) Heather Watson	(Australia) Samantha Stosur [18]	6–3, 3–6, 6–0
Men's Singles 1st Round	(Bulgaria) Grigor Dimitrov [15]	(Australia) Christopher O'Connell [WC]	7–6^{(7–2)}, 6–3, 6–3
Women's Singles 1st Round	(Australia) Daria Gavrilova [22]	(United Kingdom) Naomi Broady	3–6, 6–4, 7–5
Matches on Hisense Arena
Event	Winner	Loser	Score
Men's Singles 1st Round	(Germany) Alexander Zverev [24]	(Netherlands) Robin Haase	6–2, 3–6, 5–7, 6–3, 6–2
Women's Singles 1st Round	(Slovakia) Dominika Cibulková [6]	(Czech Republic) Denisa Allertová	7–5, 6–2
Women's Singles 1st Round	(Denmark) Caroline Wozniacki [17]	(Australia) Arina Rodionova [WC]	6–1, 6–2
Men's Singles 1st Round	(Spain) David Ferrer [21]	(Australia) Omar Jasika [WC]	6–3, 6–0, 6–2
Colored background indicates a night match
Day matches began at 11:00 am local time, whilst night matches began at 7:00 pm local time.

== Day 3 (18 January) ==
- Seeds out:
  - Men's Singles: (Croatia) Marin Čilić [7], (Australia) Nick Kyrgios [14], (United States) John Isner [19]
  - Women's Singles: (Spain) Carla Suárez Navarro [10], (China) Zhang Shuai [20], (Romania) Irina-Camelia Begu [27], (Puerto Rico) Monica Puig [29]
  - Men's Doubles: (Canada) Vasek Pospisil / (Czech Republic) Radek Štěpánek [12]
  - Women's Doubles: (Chinese Taipei) Chan Hao-ching / (Chinese Taipei) Chan Yung-jan [6], (Romania) Monica Niculescu / (United States) Abigail Spears [9], (Croatia) Darija Jurak / (Australia) Anastasia Rodionova [16]
- Schedule of Play

Matches on main courts
Matches on Rod Laver Arena
Event	Winner	Loser	Score
Women's Singles 2nd Round	(United States) Venus Williams [13]	(Switzerland) Stefanie Vögele [Q]	6–3, 6–2
Women's Singles 2nd Round	(Germany) Angelique Kerber [1]	(Germany) Carina Witthöft	6–2, 6–7^{(3–7)}, 6–2
Men's Singles 2nd Round	(Switzerland) Roger Federer [17]	(United States) Noah Rubin [Q]	7–5, 6–3, 7–6^{(7–3)}
Women's Singles 2nd Round	(Spain) Garbiñe Muguruza [7]	(United States) Samantha Crawford	7–5, 6–4
Men's Singles 2nd Round	(United Kingdom) Andy Murray [1]	(Russia) Andrey Rublev [Q]	6–3, 6–0, 6–2
Matches on Margaret Court Arena
Event	Winner	Loser	Score
Women's Singles 2nd Round	(Ukraine) Elina Svitolina [11]	(United States) Julia Boserup [Q]	6–4, 6–1
Women's Singles 2nd Round	(Russia) Svetlana Kuznetsova [8]	(Australia) Jaimee Fourlis [WC]	6–2, 6–1
Men's Singles 2nd Round	(Switzerland) Stan Wawrinka [4]	(United States) Steve Johnson	6–3, 6–4, 6–4
Women's Singles 2nd Round	(Australia) Ashleigh Barty [WC]	(United States) Shelby Rogers	7–5, 6–1
Men's Singles 2nd Round	(Australia) Bernard Tomic [27]	(Dominican Republic) Víctor Estrella Burgos	7–5, 7–6^{(7–4)}, 4–6, 7–6^{(7–5)}
Matches on Hisense Arena
Event	Winner	Loser	Score
Men's Singles 2nd Round	(Japan) Kei Nishikori [5]	(France) Jérémy Chardy	6–3, 6–4, 6–3
Women's Singles 2nd Round	(Serbia) Jelena Janković	(Germany) Julia Görges	6–3, 6–4
Women's Singles 2nd Round	(Canada) Eugenie Bouchard	(China) Peng Shuai	7–6^{(7–5)}, 6–2
Men's Singles 2nd Round	(Italy) Andreas Seppi	(Australia) Nick Kyrgios [14]	1–6, 6–7^{(1–7)}, 6–4, 6–2, 10–8
Colored background indicates a night match
Day matches began at 11:00 am local time, whilst night matches began at 7:00 pm local time.

== Day 4 (19 January) ==
- Seeds out:
  - Men's Singles: (Serbia) Novak Djokovic [2]
  - Women's Singles: (Poland) Agnieszka Radwańska [3], (France) Alizé Cornet [28], (Kazakhstan) Yulia Putintseva [31]
  - Men's Doubles: (United Kingdom) Jamie Murray / (Brazil) Bruno Soares [2], (Croatia) Mate Pavić / (Austria) Alexander Peya [13]
  - Women's Doubles: (Germany) Julia Görges / (Czech Republic) Karolína Plíšková [7], (Czech Republic) Lucie Hradecká / (Czech Republic) Kateřina Siniaková [10]
- Schedule of Play

Matches on main courts
Matches on Rod Laver Arena
Event	Winner	Loser	Score
Women's Singles 2nd Round	(United Kingdom) Johanna Konta [9]	(Japan) Naomi Osaka	6–4, 6–2
Women's Singles 2nd Round	(Denmark) Caroline Wozniacki [17]	(Croatia) Donna Vekić	6–1, 6–3
Men's Singles 2nd Round	(Uzbekistan) Denis Istomin [WC]	(Serbia) Novak Djokovic [2]	7–6^{(10–8)}, 5–7, 2–6, 7–6^{(7–5)}, 6–4
Women's Singles 2nd Round	(United States) Serena Williams [2]	(Czech Republic) Lucie Šafářová	6–3, 6–4
Men's Singles 2nd Round	(Spain) Rafael Nadal [9]	(Cyprus) Marcos Baghdatis	6–3, 6–1, 6–3
Matches on Margaret Court Arena
Event	Winner	Loser	Score
Women's Singles 2nd Round	(Czech Republic) Karolína Plíšková [5]	(Russia) Anna Blinkova [Q]	6–0, 6–2
Women's Singles 2nd Round	(Slovakia) Dominika Cibulková [6]	(Chinese Taipei) Hsieh Su-wei	6–4, 7–6^{(10–8)}
Men's Singles 2nd Round	(Canada) Milos Raonic [3]	(Luxembourg) Gilles Müller	6–3, 6–4, 7–6^{(7–4)}
Women's Singles 2nd Round	(Croatia) Mirjana Lučić-Baroni	(Poland) Agnieszka Radwańska [3]	6–3, 6–2
Men's Singles 2nd Round	(Austria) Dominic Thiem [8]	(Australia) Jordan Thompson	6–2, 6–1, 6–7^{(6–8)}, 6–4
Matches on Hisense Arena
Event	Winner	Loser	Score
Women's Singles 2nd Round	(Russia) Ekaterina Makarova [30]	(Italy) Sara Errani	6–2, 3–2, retired
Men's Singles 2nd Round	(Bulgaria) Grigor Dimitrov [15]	(South Korea) Chung Hyeon	1–6, 6–4, 6–4, 6–4
Men's Singles 2nd Round	(France) Gaël Monfils [6]	(Ukraine) Alexandr Dolgopolov	6–3, 6–4, 1–6, 6–0
Women's Singles 2nd Round	(Australia) Daria Gavrilova [22]	(Croatia) Ana Konjuh	6–2, 1–6, 6–4
Colored background indicates a night match
Day matches began at 11:00 am local time, whilst night matches began at 7:00 pm local time.

== Day 5 (20 January) ==
- Seeds out:
  - Men's Singles: (Czech Republic) Tomáš Berdych [10], (United States) Jack Sock [23], (Australia) Bernard Tomic [27], (Serbia) Viktor Troicki [29], (United States) Sam Querrey [31]
  - Women's Singles: (Ukraine) Elina Svitolina [11], (Latvia) Anastasija Sevastova [32]
  - Men's Doubles: (Canada) Daniel Nestor / (France) Édouard Roger-Vasselin [8], (India) Rohan Bopanna / (Uruguay) Pablo Cuevas [15]
  - Mixed Doubles: (Czech Republic) Lucie Hradecká / (Czech Republic) Radek Štěpánek [7]
- Schedule of Play

Matches on main courts
Matches on Rod Laver Arena
Event	Winner	Loser	Score
Women's Singles 3rd Round	(United States) Coco Vandeweghe	(Canada) Eugenie Bouchard	6–4, 3–6, 7–5
Women's Singles 3rd Round	(Germany) Angelique Kerber [1]	(Czech Republic) Kristýna Plíšková	6–0, 6–4
Men's Singles 3rd Round	(Switzerland) Stan Wawrinka [4]	(Serbia) Viktor Troicki [29]	3–6, 6–2, 6–2, 7–6^{(9–7)}
Women's Singles 3rd Round	(Germany) Mona Barthel [Q]	(Australia) Ashleigh Barty [WC]	6–4, 3–6, 6–3
Men's Singles 3rd Round	(Switzerland) Roger Federer [17]	(Czech Republic) Tomáš Berdych [10]	6–2, 6–4, 6–4
Matches on Margaret Court Arena
Event	Winner	Loser	Score
Women's Singles 3rd Round	(Russia) Anastasia Pavlyuchenkova [24]	(Ukraine) Elina Svitolina [11]	7–5, 4–6, 6–3
Men's Singles 3rd Round	(France) Jo-Wilfried Tsonga [12]	(United States) Jack Sock [23]	7–6^{(7–4)}, 7–5, 6–7^{(8–10)}, 6–3
Women's Singles 3rd Round	(United States) Venus Williams [13]	(China) Duan Yingying	6–1, 6–0
Men's Singles 3rd Round	(Japan) Kei Nishikori [5]	(Slovakia) Lukáš Lacko [Q]	6–4, 6–4, 6–4
Women's Singles 3rd Round	(Spain) Garbiñe Muguruza [7]	(Latvia) Anastasija Sevastova [32]	6–4, 6–2
Matches on Hisense Arena
Event	Winner	Loser	Score
Women's Singles 3rd Round	(Russia) Svetlana Kuznetsova [8]	(Serbia) Jelena Janković	6–4, 5–7, 9–7
Men's Singles 3rd Round	(United Kingdom) Andy Murray [1]	(United States) Sam Querrey [31]	6–4, 6–2, 6–4
Men's Singles 3rd Round	(United Kingdom) Daniel Evans	(Australia) Bernard Tomic [27]	7–5, 7–6^{(7–2)}, 7–6^{(7–3)}
Colored background indicates a night match
Day matches began at 11:00 am local time, whilst night matches began at 7:00 pm local time.

== Day 6 (21 January) ==
- Seeds out:
  - Men's Singles: (France) Richard Gasquet [18], (Croatia) Ivo Karlović [20], (Spain) David Ferrer [21], (Germany) Alexander Zverev [24], (France) Gilles Simon [25], (Spain) Pablo Carreño Busta [30], (Germany) Philipp Kohlschreiber [32]
  - Women's Singles: (Slovakia) Dominika Cibulková [6], (Switzerland) Timea Bacsinszky [12], (Russia) Elena Vesnina [14], (Denmark) Caroline Wozniacki [17], (France) Caroline Garcia [21]
  - Men's Doubles: (South Africa) Raven Klaasen / (United States) Rajeev Ram [6], (Philippines) Treat Huey / (Belarus) Max Mirnyi [10]
  - Women's Doubles: (Switzerland) Martina Hingis / (United States) Coco Vandeweghe [5], (Netherlands) Kiki Bertens / (Sweden) Johanna Larsson [14]
- Schedule of Play

Matches on main courts
Matches on Rod Laver Arena
Event	Winner	Loser	Score
Women's Singles 3rd Round	(Russia) Ekaterina Makarova [30]	(Slovakia) Dominika Cibulková [6]	6–2, 6–7^{(3–7)}, 6–3
Women's Singles 3rd Round	(United States) Serena Williams [2]	(United States) Nicole Gibbs	6–1, 6–3
Men's Singles 3rd Round	(Spain) Rafael Nadal [9]	(Germany) Alexander Zverev [24]	4–6, 6–3, 6–7^{(5–7)}, 6–3, 6–2
Women's Singles 3rd Round	(Australia) Daria Gavrilova [22]	(Switzerland) Timea Bacsinszky [12]	6–3, 5–7, 6–4
Men's Singles 3rd Round	(Bulgaria) Grigor Dimitrov [15]	(France) Richard Gasquet [18]	6–3, 6–2, 6–4
Matches on Margaret Court Arena
Event	Winner	Loser	Score
Women's Singles 3rd Round	(Czech Republic) Barbora Strýcová [16]	(France) Caroline Garcia [21]	6–2, 7–5
Men's Singles 3rd Round	(Austria) Dominic Thiem [8]	(France) Benoît Paire	6–1, 4–6, 6–4, 6–4
Women's Singles 3rd Round	(United Kingdom) Johanna Konta [9]	(Denmark) Caroline Wozniacki [17]	6–3, 6–1
Men's Singles 3rd Round	(France) Gaël Monfils [6]	(Germany) Philipp Kohlschreiber [32]	6–3, 7–6^{(7–1)}, 6–4
Women's Singles 3rd Round	(Czech Republic) Karolína Plíšková [5]	(Latvia) Jeļena Ostapenko	4–6, 6–0, 10–8
Matches on Hisense Arena
Event	Winner	Loser	Score
Men's Legends Doubles	(United States) John McEnroe (United States) Patrick McEnroe	(France) Mansour Bahrami (France) Fabrice Santoro	4–2, 2–4, 4–1
Men's Singles 3rd Round	(Belgium) David Goffin [11]	(Croatia) Ivo Karlović [20]	6–3, 6–2, 6–4
Men's Legends Doubles	(Sweden) Jonas Björkman (Sweden) Thomas Johansson	(South Africa) Wayne Ferreira (France) Henri Leconte	4–3^{(5–3)}, 4–2
Women's Doubles 2nd Round	(Australia) Ashleigh Barty [WC] (Australia) Casey Dellacqua [WC]	(Switzerland) Martina Hingis [5] (United States) Coco Vandeweghe [5]	6–2, 7–5
Men's Singles 3rd Round	(Canada) Milos Raonic [3]	(France) Gilles Simon [25]	6–2, 7–6^{(7–5)}, 3–6, 6–3
Colored background indicates a night match
Day matches began at 11:00 am local time, whilst night matches began at 7:00 pm local time.

== Day 7 (22 January) ==
- Seeds out:
  - Men's Singles: (United Kingdom) Andy Murray [1], (Japan) Kei Nishikori [5]
  - Women's Singles: (Germany) Angelique Kerber [1], (Russia) Svetlana Kuznetsova [8]
  - Men's Doubles: (Spain) Feliciano López / (Spain) Marc López [5], (Netherlands) Jean-Julien Rojer / (Romania) Horia Tecău [11], (United Kingdom) Dominic Inglot / (Romania) Florin Mergea [16]
  - Women's Doubles: (India) Sania Mirza / (Czech Republic) Barbora Strýcová [4], (United States) Vania King / (Kazakhstan) Yaroslava Shvedova [8]
  - Mixed Doubles: (Czech Republic) Andrea Hlaváčková / (France) Édouard Roger-Vasselin [3], (Chinese Taipei) Chan Hao-ching / (Belarus) Max Mirnyi [4], (Czech Republic) Barbora Krejčíková / (United States) Rajeev Ram [8]
- Schedule of Play

Matches on main courts
Matches on Rod Laver Arena
Event	Winner	Loser	Score
Women's Singles 4th Round	(Russia) Anastasia Pavlyuchenkova [24]	(Russia) Svetlana Kuznetsova [8]	6–3, 6–3
Women's Singles 4th Round	(United States) Venus Williams [13]	(Germany) Mona Barthel [Q]	6–3, 7–5
Men's Singles 4th Round	(Germany) Mischa Zverev	(United Kingdom) Andy Murray [1]	7–5, 5–7, 6–2, 6–4
Men's Singles 4th Round	(Switzerland) Roger Federer [17]	(Japan) Kei Nishikori [5]	6–7^{(4–7)}, 6–4, 6–1, 4–6, 6–3
Women's Singles 4th Round	(United States) Coco Vandeweghe	(Germany) Angelique Kerber [1]	6–2, 6–3
Matches on Margaret Court Arena
Event	Winner	Loser	Score
Men's Doubles 3rd Round	(Australia) Marc Polmans [WC] (Australia) Andrew Whittington [WC]	(Netherlands) Jean-Julien Rojer [11] (Romania) Horia Tecău [11]	7–6^{(7–5)}, 7–6^{(7–5)}
Men's Doubles 3rd Round	(Australia) Alex Bolt [WC] (Australia) Bradley Mousley [WC]	(United States) Sam Querrey (United States) Donald Young	7–5, 3–6, 7–5
Men's Singles 4th Round	(Switzerland) Stan Wawrinka [4]	(Italy) Andreas Seppi	7–6^{(7–2)}, 7–6^{(7–4)}, 7–6^{(7–4)}
Women's Singles 4th Round	(Spain) Garbiñe Muguruza [7]	(Romania) Sorana Cîrstea	6–2, 6–3
Matches on Hisense Arena
Event	Winner	Loser	Score
Men's Doubles 3rd Round	(France) Pierre-Hugues Herbert [1] (France) Nicolas Mahut [1]	(United Kingdom) Dominic Inglot [16] (Romania) Florin Mergea [16]	2–6, 7–5, 6–2
Mixed Doubles 1st Round	(Australia) Casey Dellacqua [WC] (Australia) Matt Reid [WC]	(Czech Republic) Barbora Krejčíková [8] (United States) Rajeev Ram [8]	5–7, 7–6^{(7–2)}, [10–7]
Men's Legend Doubles	(France) Mansour Bahrami (France) Fabrice Santoro	(Australia) Pat Cash (Croatia) Goran Ivanišević	4–3^{(5–3)}, 4–1
Men's Singles 4th Round	(France) Jo-Wilfried Tsonga [12]	(United Kingdom) Daniel Evans	6–7^{(4–7)}, 6–2, 6–4, 6–4
Colored background indicates a night match
Day matches began at 11:00 am local time, whilst night matches began at 7:00 pm local time.

== Day 8 (23 January) ==
- Seeds out
  - Men's Singles: (France) Gaël Monfils [6], (Austria) Dominic Thiem [8], (Spain) Roberto Bautista Agut [13]
  - Women's Singles: (Czech Republic) Barbora Strýcová [16], (Australia) Daria Gavrilova [22], (Russia) Ekaterina Makarova [30]
  - Men's Doubles: (Poland) Łukasz Kubot / (Brazil) Marcelo Melo [7], (Colombia) Juan Sebastián Cabal / (Colombia) Robert Farah [14]
  - Women's Doubles: (Slovenia) Katarina Srebotnik / (China) Zheng Saisai [13]
- Schedule of Play

Matches on main courts
Matches on Rod Laver Arena
Event	Winner	Loser	Score
Women's Singles 4th Round	(United States) Serena Williams [2]	(Czech Republic) Barbora Strýcová [16]	7–5, 6–4
Men's Singles 4th Round	(Belgium) David Goffin [11]	(Austria) Dominic Thiem [8]	5–7, 7–6^{(7–4)}, 6–2, 6–2
Mixed Doubles 2nd Round	(Switzerland) Martina Hingis [WC] (India) Leander Paes [WC]	(Australia) Casey Dellacqua [WC] (Australia) Matt Reid [WC]	6–2, 6–3
Women's Singles 4th Round	(Czech Republic) Karolína Plíšková [5]	(Australia) Daria Gavrilova [22]	6–3, 6–3
Men's Singles 4th Round	(Spain) Rafael Nadal [9]	(France) Gaël Monfils [6]	6–3, 6–3, 4–6, 6–4
Matches on Margaret Court Arena
Event	Winner	Loser	Score
Men's Doubles 3rd Round	(United States) Bob Bryan [3] (United States) Mike Bryan [3]	(United States) Brian Baker (Croatia) Nikola Mektić	6–3, 7–6^{(13–11)}
Women's Singles 4th Round	(United Kingdom) Johanna Konta [9]	(Russia) Ekaterina Makarova [30]	6–1, 6–4
Women's Singles 4th Round	(Croatia) Mirjana Lučić-Baroni	(United States) Jennifer Brady [Q]	6–4, 6–2
Men's Singles 4th Round	(Bulgaria) Grigor Dimitrov [15]	(Uzbekistan) Denis Istomin [WC]	2–6, 7–6^{(7–2)}, 6–2, 6–1
Matches on Hisense Arena
Event	Winner	Loser	Score
Women's Doubles 3rd Round	(Australia) Ashleigh Barty [WC] (Australia) Casey Dellacqua [WC]	(Germany) Anna-Lena Grönefeld (Czech Republic) Květa Peschke	6–4, 6–4
Men's Doubles 3rd Round	(Finland) Henri Kontinen [4] (Australia) John Peers [4]	(Colombia) Juan Sebastián Cabal [14] (Colombia) Robert Farah [14]	6–7^{(7–3)}, 7–6^{(7–5)}, 7–6^{(7–1)}
Men's Doubles 3rd Round	(Australia) Sam Groth (Australia) Chris Guccione	(New Zealand) Marcus Daniell (Brazil) Marcelo Demoliner	7–6^{(11–9)}, 6–3
Men's Singles 4th Round	(Canada) Milos Raonic [3]	(Spain) Roberto Bautista Agut [13]	7–6^{(8–6)}, 3–6, 6–4, 6–1
Colored background indicates a night match
Day matches began at 11:00 am local time, whilst night matches began at 7:00 pm local time.

== Day 9 (24 January) ==
- Seeds out
  - Men's Singles: (France) Jo-Wilfried Tsonga [12]
  - Women's Singles: (Spain) Garbiñe Muguruza [7], (Russia) Anastasia Pavlyuchenkova [24]
  - Men's Doubles: (Croatia) Ivan Dodig / (Spain) Marcel Granollers [9]
  - Women's Doubles: (Russia) Ekaterina Makarova / (Russia) Elena Vesnina [3], (United States) Raquel Atawo / (China) Xu Yifan [11]
  - Mixed Doubles: (Chinese Taipei) Chan Yung-jan / (Poland) Łukasz Kubot [5], (Czech Republic) Kateřina Siniaková / (Brazil) Bruno Soares [6]
- Schedule of Play

Matches on main courts
Matches on Rod Laver Arena
Event	Winner	Loser	Score
Women's Singles Quarterfinals	(United States) Venus Williams [13]	(Russia) Anastasia Pavlyuchenkova [24]	6–4, 7–6^{(7–3)}
Women's Singles Quarterfinals	(United States) Coco Vandeweghe	(Spain) Garbiñe Muguruza [7]	6–4, 6–0
Men's Singles Quarterfinals	(Switzerland) Stan Wawrinka [4]	(France) Jo-Wilfried Tsonga [12]	7–6^{(7–2)}, 6–4, 6–3
Men's Singles Quarterfinals	(Switzerland) Roger Federer [17]	(Germany) Mischa Zverev	6–1, 7–5, 6–2
Women's Doubles Quarterfinals	(France) Caroline Garcia [1] (France) Kristina Mladenovic [1]	(Australia) Ashleigh Barty [WC] (Australia) Casey Dellacqua [WC]	1–6, 6–2, 6–1
Matches on Margaret Court Arena
Event	Winner	Loser	Score
Men's Legends Doubles	(United States) Michael Chang (United States) Todd Martin	(United States) John McEnroe (United States) Patrick McEnroe	1–4, 4–3^{(5–2)}, 4–3^{(5–4)}
Men's Doubles Quarterfinals	(United States) Bob Bryan [3] (United States) Mike Bryan [3]	(Croatia) Ivan Dodig [9] (Spain) Marcel Granollers [9]	7–6^{(7–5)}, 5–7, 6–4
Men's Legends Doubles	(France) Mansour Bahrami (Australia) Todd Woodbridge	(Netherlands) Jacco Eltingh (Netherlands) Paul Haarhuis	4–2, 1–4, 4–3^{(5–4)}
Mixed Doubles 2nd Round	(Australia) Samantha Stosur [WC] (Australia) Sam Groth [WC]	(Croatia) Darija Jurak (Netherlands) Jean-Julien Rojer	7–6^{(8–6)}, 7–5
Men's Doubles Quarterfinals	(Spain) Pablo Carreño Busta (Spain) Guillermo García-López	(Australia) Alex Bolt [WC] (Australia) Bradley Mousley [WC]	7–6^{(7–4)}, 4–6, 6–3
Colored background indicates a night match
Day matches began at 11:00 am local time, whilst night matches began at 7:00 pm local time.

== Day 10 (25 January) ==
- Seeds out
  - Men's Singles: (Canada) Milos Raonic [3], (Belgium) David Goffin [11]
  - Women's Singles: (Czech Republic) Karolína Plíšková [5], (United Kingdom) Johanna Konta [9]
  - Men's Doubles: (France) Pierre-Hugues Herbert / (France) Nicolas Mahut [1]
  - Women's Doubles: (France) Caroline Garcia / (France) Kristina Mladenovic [1]
- Schedule of Play

Matches on main courts
Matches on Rod Laver Arena
Event	Winner	Loser	Score
Women's Singles Quarterfinals	(Croatia) Mirjana Lučić-Baroni	(Czech Republic) Karolína Plíšková [5]	6–4, 3–6, 6–4
Women's Singles Quarterfinals	(United States) Serena Williams [2]	(United Kingdom) Johanna Konta [9]	6–2, 6–3
Men's Singles Quarterfinals	(Bulgaria) Grigor Dimitrov [15]	(Belgium) David Goffin [11]	6–3, 6–2, 6–4
Men's Singles Quarterfinals	(Spain) Rafael Nadal [9]	(Canada) Milos Raonic [3]	6–4, 7–6^{(9–7)}, 6–4
Men's Doubles Quarterfinals	(Finland) Henri Kontinen [4] (Australia) John Peers [4]	(Australia) Sam Groth (Australia) Chris Guccione	7–5, 6–3
Matches on Margaret Court Arena
Event	Winner	Loser	Score
Men's Legends Doubles	(Sweden) Thomas Johansson (Australia) Todd Woodbridge	(Australia) Wayne Arthurs (Australia) Richard Fromberg	4–2, 1–4, 4–3^{(5–3)}
Mixed Doubles Quarterfinals	(United States) Abigail Spears (Colombia) Juan Sebastián Cabal	(Netherlands) Michaëlla Krajicek (South Africa) Raven Klaasen	6–4, 6–3
Men's Doubles Quarterfinals	(Australia) Marc Polmans [WC] (Australia) Andrew Whittington [WC]	(France) Pierre-Hugues Herbert [1] (France) Nicolas Mahut [1]	7–6^{(7–2)}, 2–6, 6–4
Women's Doubles Semifinals	(Czech Republic) Andrea Hlaváčková [12] (China) Peng Shuai [12]	(France) Caroline Garcia [1] (France) Kristina Mladenovic [1]	7–6^{(7–4)}, 6–2
Colored background indicates a night match
Day matches began at 11:00 am local time, whilst night matches began at 7:30 pm local time.

== Day 11 (26 January) ==
- Seeds out
  - Men's Singles: (Switzerland) Stan Wawrinka [4]
  - Mixed Doubles: (United States) Bethanie Mattek-Sands / (United States) Mike Bryan [1]
- Schedule of Play

Matches on main courts
Matches on Rod Laver Arena
Event	Winner	Loser	Score
Men's Doubles Semifinals	(United States) Bob Bryan [3] (United States) Mike Bryan [3]	(Spain) Pablo Carreño Busta (Spain) Guillermo García-López	7–6^{(7–1)}, 6–3
Women's Singles Semifinals	(United States) Venus Williams [13]	(United States) Coco Vandeweghe	6–7^{(3–7)}, 6–2, 6–3
Women's Singles Semifinals	(United States) Serena Williams [2]	(Croatia) Mirjana Lučić-Baroni	6–2, 6–1
Men's Singles Semifinals	(Switzerland) Roger Federer [17]	(Switzerland) Stan Wawrinka [4]	7–5, 6–3, 1–6, 4–6, 6–3
Men's Legends Doubles	(United States) John McEnroe (United States) Patrick McEnroe	(Australia) Pat Cash (Croatia) Goran Ivanišević	2–4, 4–3^{(5–2)}, 4–2
Matches on Margaret Court Arena
Event	Winner	Loser	Score
Men's Legends Doubles	(Australia) Wayne Arthurs (Australia) Richard Fromberg	(South Africa) Wayne Ferreira (France) Henri Leconte	4–3^{(5–2)}, 1–4, 4–2
Men's Legends Doubles	(France) Mansour Bahrami (France) Fabrice Santoro	(Sweden) Thomas Johansson (Australia) Todd Woodbridge	4–2, 4–3^{(5–4)}
Men's Doubles Semifinals	(Finland) Henri Kontinen [4] (Australia) John Peers [4]	(Australia) Marc Polmans [WC] (Australia) Andrew Whittington [WC]	6–4, 6–4
Mixed Doubles Quarterfinals	(Ukraine) Elina Svitolina (Australia) Chris Guccione	(United States) Bethanie Mattek-Sands [1] (United States) Mike Bryan [1]	Walkover
Mixed Doubles Quarterfinals	(Australia) Samantha Stosur [WC] (Australia) Sam Groth [WC]	(Switzerland) Martina Hingis [WC] (India) Leander Paes [WC]	6–3, 6–2
Colored background indicates a night match
Day matches began at 11:00 am local time, whilst night matches began at 7:30 pm local time.

== Day 12 (27 January) ==
- Seeds out
  - Men's Singles: (Bulgaria) Grigor Dimitrov [15]
  - Women's Doubles: (Czech Republic) Andrea Hlaváčková / (China) Peng Shuai [12]
- Schedule of Play

Matches on main courts
Matches on Rod Laver Arena
Event	Winner	Loser	Score
Mixed Doubles Semifinals	(India) Sania Mirza [2] (Croatia) Ivan Dodig [2]	(Australia) Samantha Stosur (Australia) Sam Groth	6–4, 2–6, [10–5]
Women's Doubles Final	(United States) Bethanie Mattek-Sands [2] (Czech Republic) Lucie Šafářová [2]	(Czech Republic) Andrea Hlaváčková [12] (China) Peng Shuai [12]	6–7^{(4–7)}, 6–3, 6–3
Men's Singles Semifinals	(Spain) Rafael Nadal [9]	(Bulgaria) Grigor Dimitrov [15]	6–3, 5–7, 7–6^{(7–5)}, 6–7^{(4–7)}, 6–4
Matches on Margaret Court Arena
Event	Winner	Loser	Score
Mixed Doubles Semifinals	(United States) Abigail Spears (Colombia) Juan Sebastián Cabal	(Ukraine) Elina Svitolina (Australia) Chris Guccione	7–6^{(7–1)}, 6–2
Men's Legends Doubles	(Australia) Wayne Arthurs (Australia) Richard Fromberg	(United States) Michael Chang (United States) Todd Martin	4–1, 1–4, 4–3^{(5–4)}
Colored background indicates a night match
Day matches began at 11:00 am local time, whilst night matches began at 7:30 pm local time.

== Day 13 (28 January) ==
- Seeds out
  - Women's Singles: (United States) Venus Williams [13]
  - Men's Doubles: (United States) Bob Bryan / (United States) Mike Bryan [3]
- Schedule of Play

Matches on main courts
Matches on Rod Laver Arena
Event	Winner	Loser	Score
Women's Singles Final	(United States) Serena Williams [2]	(United States) Venus Williams [13]	6–4, 6–4
Men's Doubles Final	(Finland) Henri Kontinen [4] (Australia) John Peers [4]	(United States) Bob Bryan [3] (United States) Mike Bryan [3]	7–5, 7–5
Colored background indicates a night match
Day matches began at 11:00 am local time, whilst night matches began at 7:30 pm local time.

== Day 14 (29 January) ==
- Seeds out
  - Men's Singles: (Spain) Rafael Nadal [9]
  - Mixed Doubles: (India) Sania Mirza / (Croatia) Ivan Dodig [2]
- Schedule of Play

Matches on main courts
Matches on Rod Laver Arena
Event	Winner	Loser	Score
Mixed Doubles Final	(United States) Abigail Spears (Colombia) Juan Sebastián Cabal	(India) Sania Mirza [2] (Croatia) Ivan Dodig [2]	6–2, 6–4
Men's Singles Final	(Switzerland) Roger Federer [17]	(Spain) Rafael Nadal [9]	6–4, 3–6, 6–1, 3–6, 6–3
Colored background indicates a night match
Day matches began at 11:00 am local time, whilst night matches began at 7:30 pm local time.
