= 2017 Australian Open – Girls' singles =

Girls' singles
- 2017 Australian Open

Final
- Champion: (Ukraine) Marta Kostyuk
- Runner-up: (Switzerland) Rebeka Masarova
- Score: 7–5, 1–6, 6–4

Events
Singles	men	women		boys	girls
Doubles	men	women	mixed	boys	girls
WC Singles	men	women	quad
WC Doubles	men	women	quad
Legends	men	women	mixed
- Australian Open

Marta Kostyuk won the title, defeating Rebeka Masarova in the final, 7–5, 1–6, 6–4.

Vera Lapko was the defending champion, but was no longer eligible to participate in junior events. She received a wildcard into the women's singles qualifying competition, where she lost in the second round to Ons Jabeur.

== Seeds ==
1. (Switzerland) Rebeka Masarova (final)
2. (United States) Taylor Johnson (third round)
3. (China) Wang Xiyu (second round)
4. (United Kingdom) Emily Appleton (quarterfinals)
5. (Serbia) Olga Danilović (third round, retired)
6. (United Kingdom) Jodie Anna Burrage (third round)
7. (Canada) Bianca Andreescu (semifinals)
8. (Poland) Iga Świątek (first round)
9. (Japan) Ayumi Miyamoto (first round)
10. (Japan) Mai Hontama (quarterfinals)
11. (Ukraine) Marta Kostyuk (champion)
12. (United States) Caty McNally (first round)
13. (United States) Carson Branstine (third round)
14. (Japan) Yuki Naito (third round)
15. (United States) Natasha Subhash (first round)
16. (Russia) Elena Rybakina (semifinals)

== Draw ==
Key

- Q = Qualifier
- WC = Wild card
- LL = Lucky loser
- Alt = Alternate
- ITF = ITF entry
- PR = Protected ranking
- SR = Special ranking
- SE = Special exempt
- JE = Junior exempt
- JR = Junior Accelerator Programme entrant
- CO = College Accelerator Programme entrant
- NG = Next Gen Accelerator Program entrant
- w/o = Walkover
- r = Retired
- d = Defaulted

=== Finals ===
Quarterfinals
1	(Switzerland) Rebeka Masarova	6	6
10	(Japan) Mai Hontama	3	1
4	(United Kingdom) Emily Appleton	2	2
7	(Canada) Bianca Andreescu	6	6
11	(Ukraine) Marta Kostyuk	6	6
(Chinese Taipei) Liang En-shuo	3	1
(India) Zeel Desai	4	3
16	(Russia) Elena Rybakina	6	6

Semifinals
1	(Switzerland) Rebeka Masarova	4	7^{7}	6
7	(Canada) Bianca Andreescu	6	6^{5}	0
11	(Ukraine) Marta Kostyuk	6	7
16	(Russia) Elena Rybakina	1	5

Final
1	(Switzerland) Rebeka Masarova	5	6	4
11	(Ukraine) Marta Kostyuk	7	1	6

=== Top half ===
==== Section 1 ====
First round
1	(Switzerland) Rebeka Masarova	6	7
Q	(Japan) Himari Satō	2	5
(China) Wang Xinyu	6	0
(Italy) Maria Vittoria Viviani	2	0^{d}
(Australia) Baijing Lin	7	4	7
(Norway) Malene Helgø	5	6	5
Q	(Papua New Guinea) Patricia Apisah	1	3
13	(United States) Carson Branstine	6	6
10	(Japan) Mai Hontama	6	6
(United States) Nicole Mossmer	1	3
(India) Mihika Yadav	6	6
Q	(United Kingdom) Ali Collins	3	4
Q	(Russia) Ekaterina Vishnevskaya	6	6
WC	(Australia) Lisa Mays	2	1
(Chinese Taipei) Chen Pei-hsuan	2	7	6
8	(Poland) Iga Świątek	6	5	1

Second round
1	(Switzerland) R Masarova	6	6
(China) Xin Wang	4	3
(Australia) B Lin	5	6	3
13	(United States) C Branstine	7	4	6
10	(Japan) M Hontama	6	6
(India) M Yadav	2	1
Q	(Russia) E Vishnevskaya	6	1	6
(Chinese Taipei) P-h Chen	4	6	1

Third round
1	(Switzerland) R Masarova	6	7
13	(United States) C Branstine	2	5
10	(Japan) M Hontama	6^{2}	6	6
Q	(Russia) E Vishnevskaya	7^{7}	2	1

Quarterfinals
1	(Switzerland) R Masarova	6	6
10	(Japan) M Hontama	3	1

==== Section 2 ====
First round
4	(United Kingdom) Emily Appleton	6	6
(Czech Republic) Johana Marková	3	2
(Australia) Seone Mendez	6	6
Q	(United States) Jimena Rodriguez-Benito	2	1
(Ukraine) Oleksandra Andrieieva	2	3
Q	(Luxembourg) Eléonora Molinaro	6	6
WC	(South Africa) Zoe Kruger	6	2	5
14	(Japan) Yuki Naito	2	6	7
12	(United States) Caty McNally	3	1
SE	(Australia) Gabriella Da Silva-Fick	6	6
(Romania) Mihaela Lorena Mărculescu	6^{3}	4
WC	(China) Yuan Chengyiyi	7^{7}	6
(Chinese Taipei) Cho I-hsuan	6^{5}	6	6
WC	(Australia) Ivana Popovic	7^{7}	2	2
(Italy) Lisa Piccinetti	4	0
7	(Canada) Bianca Andreescu	6	6

Second round
4	(United Kingdom) E Appleton	4	6	6
(Australia) S Mendez	6	3	2
Q	(Luxembourg) E Molinaro	6	1	3
14	(Japan) Y Naito	2	6	6
SE	(Australia) G Da Silva-Fick	3	3
WC	(China) C Yuan	6	6
(Chinese Taipei) I-h Cho	4	4
7	(Canada) B Andreescu	6	6

Third round
4	(United Kingdom) E Appleton	0	6	6
14	(Japan) Y Naito	6	3	3
WC	(China) C Yuan	0	2
7	(Canada) B Andreescu	6	6

Quarterfinals
4	(United Kingdom) E Appleton	2	2
7	(Canada) B Andreescu	6	6

=== Bottom half ===
==== Section 3 ====
First round
6	(United Kingdom) Jodie Anna Burrage	2	6	6
(Italy) Federica Bilardo	6	1	3
WC	(Australia) Michaela Haet	6	6
(United States) Hurricane Tyra Black	3	4
(Japan) Naho Sato	3	6	6
Q	(South Korea) Lee Eun-hye	6	2	2
(India) Mahak Jain	3	3
11	(Ukraine) Marta Kostyuk	6	6
15	(United States) Natasha Subhash	1	5
(Russia) Sofya Lansere	6	7
(Japan) Anri Nagata	5	6	6
WC	(Australia) Alexandra Bozovic	7	2	2
(Thailand) Thasaporn Naklo	3	1
(Chinese Taipei) Liang En-shuo	6	6
(Poland) Maja Chwalińska	7	2	3
3	(China) Wang Xiyu	5	6	6

Second round
6	(United Kingdom) JA Burrage	6	6
WC	(Australia) M Haet	4	4
(Japan) N Sato	1	6	2
11	(Ukraine) M Kostyuk	6	2	6
(Russia) S Lansere	6	6
(Japan) A Nagata	3	3
(Chinese Taipei) E-s Liang	6^{4}	6	6
3	(China) Xiy Wang	7^{7}	3	1

Third round
6	(United Kingdom) JA Burrage	7^{7}	1	4
11	(Ukraine) M Kostyuk	6^{5}	6	6
(Russia) S Lansere	4	5
(Chinese Taipei) E-s Liang	6	7

Quarterfinals
11	(Ukraine) M Kostyuk	6	6
(Chinese Taipei) E-s Liang	3	1

==== Section 4 ====
First round
5	(Serbia) Olga Danilović	6	5	6
WC	(Australia) Aleksa Cveticanin	1	7	2
(Croatia) Lea Bošković	3	4
(China) Ma Shuyue	6	6
(India) Zeel Desai	6	3	7
(Australia) Kaitlin Staines	4	6	5
Q	(Germany) Jule Niemeier	7^{7}	4	8
9	(Japan) Ayumi Miyamoto	6^{5}	6	6
16	(Russia) Elena Rybakina	6	7
(Chinese Taipei) Lee Yang	3	5
(Czech Republic) Denisa Hindová	6	6
WC	(Australia) Selina Turulja	1	2
(Italy) Tatiana Pieri	6	6
(Norway) Astrid Brune Olsen	2	3
(Papua New Guinea) Violet Apisah	7^{7}	6^{4}	2
2	(United States) Taylor Johnson	6^{4}	7^{7}	6

Second round
5	(Serbia) O Danilović	6	6
(China) S Ma	3	1
(India) Z Desai	6	6
Q	(Germany) J Niemeier	4	2
16	(Russia) E Rybakina	6	7
(Czech Republic) D Hindová	2	5
(Italy) T Pieri	7^{7}	4	4
2	(United States) T Johnson	6^{1}	6	6

Third round
5	(Serbia) O Danilović	5^{r}
(India) Z Desai	3
16	(Russia) E Rybakina	6	6
2	(United States) T Johnson	3	2

Quarterfinals
(India) Z Desai	4	3
16	(Russia) E Rybakina	6	6

== Qualifying ==
=== Seeds ===
1. (United Kingdom) Ali Collins (qualified)
2. (Germany) Jule Niemeier (qualified)
3. (South Korea) Lee Eun-hye (qualified)
4. (Luxembourg) Eléonora Molinaro (qualified)
5. (United States) Alana Smith (first round)
6. (Japan) Himari Satō (qualified)
7. (Russia) Ekaterina Vishnevskaya (qualified)
8. (Croatia) Ana Biškić (qualifying competition)
9. (Netherlands) Lexie Stevens (first round)
10. (United States) Jimena Rodriguez-Benito (qualified)
11. (Poland) Weronika Falkowska (qualifying competition)
12. (Chinese Taipei) Joanna Garland (qualifying competition)
13. (India) Nidhi Surapaneni (qualifying competition)
14. (Chinese Taipei) Cho Yi-tsen (first round)
15. (China) Yang Yidi (qualifying competition)
16. (Japan) Rika Tanaka (qualifying competition)

=== Qualifiers ===
1. (United Kingdom) Ali Collins
2. (Germany) Jule Niemeier
3. (South Korea) Lee Eun-hye
4. (Luxembourg) Eléonora Molinaro
5. (Papua New Guinea) Patricia Apisah
6. (Japan) Himari Satō
7. (Russia) Ekaterina Vishnevskaya
8. (United States) Jimena Rodriguez-Benito

=== Draw ===
==== First qualifier ====
First round				Qualifying competition
				1	(United Kingdom) Ali Collins	6	6
	(Australia) Tayla Whitehouse	3	4	13	(India) Nidhi Surapaneni	1	0
13	(India) Nidhi Surapaneni	6	6

==== Second qualifier ====
First round
2	(Germany) Jule Niemeier	6	6
(Australia) Erika Bollweg	2	2
(Japan) Satoko Sueno	6	6
14	(Chinese Taipei) Cho Yi-tsen	1	4

Qualifying competition
2	(Germany) Jule Niemeier	6	7
(Japan) Satoko Sueno	4	5

==== Third qualifier ====
First round
3	(South Korea) Lee Eun-hye	6	6
(Australia) Tenika McGiffin	4	4
(United States) Jazmin Walle	0	1
16	(Japan) Rika Tanaka	6	6

Qualifying competition
3	(South Korea) Lee Eun-hye	6	6
16	(Japan) Rika Tanaka	4	3

==== Fourth qualifier ====
First round
4	(Luxembourg) Eléonora Molinaro	6	6
(Japan) Sakura Hosogi	2	4
(Australia) Isabella Bozicevic	2	2
12	(Chinese Taipei) Joanna Garland	6	6

Qualifying competition
4	(Luxembourg) Eléonora Molinaro	6	6
12	(Chinese Taipei) Joanna Garland	4	0

==== Fifth qualifier ====
First round
5	(United States) Alana Smith	3	6^{4}
(Japan) Hikaru Sato	6	7^{7}
(Papua New Guinea) Patricia Apisah	2	6	6
9	(Netherlands) Lexie Stevens	6	2	0

Qualifying competition
(Japan) Hikaru Sato	1	7	4
(Papua New Guinea) Patricia Apisah	6	5	6

==== Sixth qualifier ====
First round
6	(Japan) Himari Satō	6	6
(Switzerland) Sina Züger	4	4
(Australia) Annerly Poulos	2	6	2
11	(Poland) Weronika Falkowska	6	1	6

Qualifying competition
6	(Japan) Himari Satō	6	6
11	(Poland) Weronika Falkowska	2	3

==== Seventh qualifier ====
First round
7	(Russia) Ekaterina Vishnevskaya	6	6
(Australia) Tahlia van der Eerden	0	0
(South Africa) Megan Basson	2	2
15	(China) Yang Yidi	6	6

Qualifying competition
7	(Russia) Ekaterina Vishnevskaya	6	6
15	(China) Yang Yidi	4	3

==== Eighth qualifier ====
First round
8	(Croatia) Ana Biškić	6	6
(Japan) Natsumi Shioya	4	2
(Australia) Amber Marshall	4	2
10	(United States) Jimena Rodriguez-Benito	6	6

Qualifying competition
8	(Croatia) Ana Biškić	4	6	5
10	(United States) Jimena Rodriguez-Benito	6	4	7
