= 2017 Australian Open – Boys' singles =

Boys' singles
- 2017 Australian Open

Final
- Champion: (Hungary) Zsombor Piros
- Runner-up: (Israel) Yshai Oliel
- Score: 4–6, 6–4, 6–3

Events
Singles	men	women		boys	girls
Doubles	men	women	mixed	boys	girls
WC Singles	men	women	quad
WC Doubles	men	women	quad
Legends	men	women	mixed
- Australian Open

Zsombor Piros won the title, defeating Yshai Oliel in the final, 4–6, 6–4, 6–3.

Oliver Anderson was the defending champion, but was no longer eligible to participate in junior events.

== Seeds ==
1. (China) Wu Yibing (semifinals)
2. (Chinese Taipei) Hsu Yu-hsiou (third round)
3. (Germany) Marvin Möller (first round)
4. (Israel) Yshai Oliel (final)
5. (France) Corentin Moutet (semifinals)
6. (Portugal) Duarte Vale (third round)
7. (Australia) Alexei Popyrin (second round)
8. (Japan) Naoki Tajima (first round)
9. (Japan) Toru Horie (first round)
10. (United States) Trent Bryde (first round)
11. (Turkey) Ergi Kırkın (second round)
12. (Poland) Kacper Żuk (first round)
13. (China) Zhao Lingxi (first round)
14. (France) Dan Added (second round)
15. (Hungary) Zsombor Piros (champion)
16. (Philippines) Alberto Lim (second round)

== Draw ==
Key

- Q = Qualifier
- WC = Wild card
- LL = Lucky loser
- Alt = Alternate
- ITF = ITF entry
- PR = Protected ranking
- SR = Special ranking
- SE = Special exempt
- JE = Junior exempt
- JR = Junior Accelerator Programme entrant
- CO = College Accelerator Programme entrant
- NG = Next Gen Accelerator Program entrant
- w/o = Walkover
- r = Retired
- d = Defaulted

=== Finals ===
Quarterfinals
1	(China) Wu Yibing	7	6
(Russia) Alexey Zakharov	5	3
4	(Israel) Yshai Oliel	6	6
Q	(Cyprus) Menelaos Efstathiou	3	3
5	(France) Corentin Moutet	6	6
(Finland) Emil Ruusuvuori	4	0
(France) Matteo Martineau	1	2
15	(Hungary) Zsombor Piros	6	6

Semifinals
1	(China) Wu Yibing	4	6	2
4	(Israel) Yshai Oliel	6	3	6
5	(France) Corentin Moutet	3	4
15	(Hungary) Zsombor Piros	6	6

Final
4	(Israel) Yshai Oliel	6	4	3
15	(Hungary) Zsombor Piros	4	6	6

=== Top half ===
==== Section 1 ====
First round
1	(China) Wu Yibing	7	6
Q	(Japan) Yuta Kikuchi	5	2
(United Kingdom) Finn Bass	6	6
(South Africa) Siphosothando Montsi	2	4
WC	(Australia) Thomas Bosancic	5	4
(France) Maxence Brovillé	7	6
(Chinese Taipei) Yin Bang-shuo	4	4
16	(Philippines) Alberto Lim	6	6
11	(Turkey) Ergi Kırkın	6	6
(United States) Olukayode Ayeni	4	4
(Italy) Mattia Frinzi	2	6	1
WC	(Australia) Chase Ferguson	6	1	6
(Republic of Ireland) Simon Carr	6^{4}	3
(Russia) Alexey Zakharov	7^{7}	6
(New Zealand) Ajeet Rai	6	4	3
7	(Australia) Alexei Popyrin	3	6	6

Second round
1	(China) Y Wu	3	6	6
(United Kingdom) F Bass	6	3	2
(France) M Brovillé	6	7^{7}
16	(Philippines) A Lim	4	6^{3}
11	(Turkey) E Kırkın	6^{4}	4
WC	(Australia) C Ferguson	7^{7}	6
(Russia) A Zakharov	6	6
7	(Australia) A Popyrin	3	0

Third round
1	(China) Y Wu	6	6
(France) M Brovillé	1	3
WC	(Australia) C Ferguson	6^{5}	1
(Russia) A Zakharov	7^{7}	6

Quarterfinals
1	(China) Y Wu	7	6
(Russia) A Zakharov	5	3

==== Section 2 ====
First round
4	(Israel) Yshai Oliel	6	6
SE	(Italy) Francesco Forti	3	1
Q	(Netherlands) len Schouten	3	6	2
WC	(Australia) Matthew Dellavedova	6	3	6
(United Kingdom) Jack Molloy	1	7	0
(United States) Alexandre Rotsaert	6	5	6
(Australia) Adam Walton	4	6	6
14	(France) Dan Added	6	1	8
9	(Japan) Toru Horie	4	3
(Chinese Taipei) Tseng Chun-hsin	6	6
Q	(Cyprus) Menelaos Efstathiou	3	6	6
(South Africa) Joshua Howard-Tripp	6	3	1
WC	(Australia) Moerani Bouzige	6	7^{9}
(China) Mu Tao	4	6^{7}
(Russia) Nikolay Vylegzhanin	1	2
6	(Portugal) Duarte Vale	6	6

Second round
4	(Israel) Y Oliel	6	6
WC	(Australia) M Dellavedova	2	1
(United States) A Rotsaert	6	6
14	(France) D Added	2	1
(Chinese Taipei) C-h Tseng	6	2	4
Q	(Cyprus) M Efstathiou	0	6	6
WC	(Australia) M Bouzige	4	3
6	(Portugal) D Vale	6	6

Third round
4	(Israel) Y Oliel	6	6
(United States) A Rotsaert	0	0
Q	(Cyprus) M Efstathiou	6^{2}	6	6
6	(Portugal) D Vale	7^{7}	4	4

Quarterfinals
4	(Israel) Y Oliel	6	6
Q	(Cyprus) M Efstathiou	3	3

=== Bottom half ===
==== Section 3 ====
First round
5	(France) Corentin Moutet	6	6
Q	(Australia) Ken Cavrak	0	1
(Belgium) Zizou Bergs	5	5
(Romania) Vlad Andrei Dancu	7	7
WC	(Australia) Dane Sweeny	0	1
(Japan) Shinji Hazawa	6	6
Q	(Netherlands) Jesper de Jong	6	3	6
10	(United States) Trent Bryde	4	6	3
13	(China) Zhao Lingxi	3	2
(Czech Republic) Michael Vrbenský	6	6
WC	(Australia) Kody Pearson	4	2
(Russia) Mikhail Sokolovskiy	6	6
(United Kingdom) Max Stewart	4	2
(Finland) Emil Ruusuvuori	6	6
WC	(Australia) Lucas Vuradin	6	6
3	(Germany) Marvin Möller	3	1

Second round
5	(France) C Moutet	6	6
(Romania) VA Dancu	1	3
(Japan) S Hazawa	6	6
Q	(Netherlands) J de Jong	2	2
(Czech Republic) M Vrbenský	6	7^{7}
(Russia) M Sokolovskiy	1	6^{5}
(Finland) E Ruusuvuori	7^{7}	6
WC	(Australia) L Vuradin	6^{0}	1

Third round
5	(France) C Moutet	6	6
(Japan) S Hazawa	3	2
(Czech Republic) M Vrbenský	3	3
(Finland) E Ruusuvuori	6	6

Quarterfinals
5	(France) C Moutet	6	6
(Finland) E Ruusuvuori	4	0

==== Section 4 ====
First round
8	(Japan) Naoki Tajima	6	5	2
(Italy) Federico Iannaccone	0	7	6
WC	(Australia) Alexander Crnokrak	2	7^{7}	7
(India) Siddhant Banthia	6	6^{3}	5
(France) Matteo Martineau	6	6
(New Zealand) Finn Reynolds	3	2
LL	(Australia) Rinky Hijikata	6	1	6
12	(Poland) Kacper Żuk	3	6	0
15	(Hungary) Zsombor Piros	6	6
(Netherlands) Ryan Nijboer	1	3
(United Kingdom) Barnaby Smith	3	6^{4}
Q	(Australia) Benard Bruno Nkomba	6	7^{7}
Q	(South Africa) Philip Henning	3	2
Q	(United States) Tristan Boyer	6	6
(Turkey) Kaya Göre	1	3
2	(Chinese Taipei) Hsu Yu-hsiou	6	6

Second round
(Italy) F Iannaccone	6	6
WC	(Australia) A Crnokrak	2	2
(France) M Martineau	6	6
LL	(Australia) R Hijikata	4	2
15	(Hungary) Z Piros	6	6
Q	(Australia) BB Nkomba	3	3
Q	(United States) T Boyer	3	0
2	(Chinese Taipei) Y-h Hsu	6	6

Third round
(Italy) F Iannaccone	6	3	4
(France) M Martineau	3	6	6
15	(Hungary) Z Piros	6	6
2	(Chinese Taipei) Y-h Hsu	3	2

Quarterfinals
(France) M Martineau	1	2
15	(Hungary) Z Piros	6	6

== Qualifying ==
=== Seeds ===
1. (South Korea) Park Ui-sung (first round)
2. (Australia) Benard Bruno Nkomba (qualified)
3. (Netherlands) Ien Schouten (qualified)
4. (Cyprus) Menelaos Efstathiou (qualified)
5. (Hong Kong) Lam Ching (first round)
6. (Thailand) Vorachon Rakpuangchon (first round)
7. (Japan) Seita Watanabe (qualifying competition)
8. (Thailand) Palaphoom Kovapitukted (qualifying competition)
9. (Netherlands) Jesper de Jong (qualified)
10. (China) Mo Yecong (qualifying competition)
11. (Hong Kong) Ming-chun Alan Sou (first round)
12. (South Korea) Sung Yo-han (qualifying competition)
13. (South Africa) Philip Henning (qualified)
14. (India) Nitin Kumar Sinha (first round)
15. (United States) Tristan Boyer (qualified)
16. (Australia) Campbell Salmon (qualifying competition)

=== Qualifiers ===
1. (United States) Tristan Boyer
2. (Australia) Benard Bruno Nkomba
3. (Netherlands) Ien Schouten
4. (Cyprus) Menelaos Efstathiou
5. (Japan) Yuta Kikuchi
6. (Australia) Ken Cavrak
7. (South Africa) Philip Henning
8. (Netherlands) Jesper de Jong

=== Lucky losers ===
1. (Australia) Rinky Hijikata

=== Draw ===
==== First qualifier ====
First round
1	(South Korea) Park Ui-sung	6^{7}	6	4
WC	(Australia) Anthony Popyrin	7^{9}	4	6
WC	(Australia) Jayden Court	2	4
15	(United States) Tristan Boyer	6	6

Qualifying competition
WC	(Australia) Anthony Popyrin	2	2
15	(United States) Tristan Boyer	6	6

==== Second qualifier ====
First round
2/WC	(Australia) Benard Bruno Nkomba	6	6
(Malaysia) Christian Didier Chin	3	1
(Australia) Rinky Hijikata	6	7
11	(Hong Kong) Ming-chun Alan Sou	4	5

Qualifying competition
2/WC	(Australia) Benard Bruno Nkomba	6	6
(Australia) Rinky Hijikata	2	3

==== Third qualifier ====
First round
3	(Netherlands) Ien Schouten	6	1	6
WC	(Australia) Joshua Charlton	4	6	3
(Japan) Kazuki Shimizu	2	6	6
14	(India) Nitin Kumar Sinha	6	1	3

Qualifying competition
3	(Netherlands) Ien Schouten	6	4	7
(Japan) Kazuki Shimizu	3	6	5

==== Fourth qualifier ====
First round
4	(Cyprus) Menelaos Efstathiou	6	6
(Australia) Michael Shepheard	1	2
(Australia) Brock Meuris	6	3	2
10	(China) Mo Yecong	1	6	6

Qualifying competition
4	(Cyprus) Menelaos Efstathiou	6	7^{7}
10	(China) Mo Yecong	3	6^{1}

==== Fifth qualifier ====
First round
5	(Hong Kong) Lam Ching	1	4
(Japan) Yuta Kikuchi	6	6
WC	(Australia) Sean Van Rensburg	5	7	4
12	(South Korea) Sung Yo-han	7	5	6

Qualifying competition
(Japan) Yuta Kikuchi	6	6
12	(South Korea) Sung Yo-han	2	1

==== Sixth qualifier ====
First round
6	(Thailand) Vorachon Rakpuangchon	6^{5}	2
WC	(Australia) Ken Cavrak	7^{7}	6
(Cyprus) Eleftherios Neos	3	0
16	(Australia) Campbell Salmon	6	6

Qualifying competition
WC	(Australia) Ken Cavrak	6	6
16	(Australia) Campbell Salmon	1	3

==== Seventh qualifier ====
First round
7	(Japan) Seita Watanabe	3	6	6
(United States) Zachary Garner	6	3	3
(Australia) Stefan Storch	4	1
13	(South Africa) Philip Henning	6	6

Qualifying competition
7	(Japan) Seita Watanabe	4	6	2
13	(South Africa) Philip Henning	6	4	6

==== Eighth qualifier ====
First round
8	(Thailand) Palaphoom Kovapitukted	7^{7}	7
(Australia) Will Maher	6^{3}	5
(Australia) Dimitri Morogiannis	1	2
9	(Netherlands) Jesper de Jong	6	6

Qualifying competition
8	(Thailand) Palaphoom Kovapitukted	0	4
9	(Netherlands) Jesper de Jong	6	6
