= 2017 Australian Open – Men's doubles =

Tennis tournament

Men's doubles
- 2017 Australian Open

Final
- Champions: (Finland) Henri Kontinen (Australia) John Peers
- Runners-up: (United States) Bob Bryan (United States) Mike Bryan
- Score: 7–5, 7–5

Details
- Draw: 64
- Seeds: 16

Events
| Singles | men | women | | boys | girls |
| Doubles | men | women | mixed | boys | girls |
| WC Singles | men | women | quad |
| WC Doubles | men | women | quad |
| Legends | men | women | mixed |
- Australian Open

Jamie Murray and Bruno Soares were the defending champions, but lost in the first round to Sam Querrey and Donald Young.

Henri Kontinen and John Peers won their maiden Grand Slam title, defeating Bob and Mike Bryan in the final, 7–5, 7–5.

== Seeds ==
1. (France) Pierre-Hugues Herbert / (France) Nicolas Mahut (quarterfinals)
2. (United Kingdom) Jamie Murray / (Brazil) Bruno Soares (first round)
3. (United States) Bob Bryan / (United States) Mike Bryan (final)
4. (Finland) Henri Kontinen / (Australia) John Peers (champions)
5. (Spain) Feliciano López / (Spain) Marc López (third round)
6. (South Africa) Raven Klaasen / (United States) Rajeev Ram (second round)
7. (Poland) Łukasz Kubot / (Brazil) Marcelo Melo (third round)
8. (Canada) Daniel Nestor / (France) Édouard Roger-Vasselin (second round)

9. (Croatia) Ivan Dodig / (Spain) Marcel Granollers (quarterfinals)
10. (Philippines) Treat Huey / (Belarus) Max Mirnyi (second round)
11. (Netherlands) Jean-Julien Rojer / (Romania) Horia Tecău (third round)
12. (Canada) Vasek Pospisil / (Czech Republic) Radek Štěpánek (first round)
13. (Croatia) Mate Pavić / (Austria) Alexander Peya (first round)
14. (Colombia) Juan Sebastián Cabal / (Colombia) Robert Farah (third round)
15. (India) Rohan Bopanna / (Uruguay) Pablo Cuevas (second round)
16. (United Kingdom) Dominic Inglot / (Romania) Florin Mergea (third round)

Click on the seed number of a player to go to their draw section.

== Draw ==
Key

- Q = Qualifier
- WC = Wild card
- LL = Lucky loser
- Alt = Alternate
- ITF = ITF entry
- PR = Protected ranking
- SR = Special ranking
- SE = Special exempt
- JE = Junior exempt
- JR = Junior Accelerator Programme entrant
- CO = College Accelerator Programme entrant
- NG = Next Gen Accelerator Program entrant
- w/o = Walkover
- r = Retired
- d = Defaulted

=== Finals ===
Quarterfinals
1 | (France) Pierre-Hugues Herbert (France) Nicolas Mahut | 6^{2} | 6 | 4
WC | (Australia) Marc Polmans (Australia) Andrew Whittington | 7^{7} | 2 | 6
4 | (Finland) Henri Kontinen (Australia) John Peers | 7 | 6
(Australia) Sam Groth (Australia) Chris Guccione | 5 | 3
9 | (Croatia) Ivan Dodig (Spain) Marcel Granollers | 6^{5} | 7 | 4
3 | (United States) Bob Bryan (United States) Mike Bryan | 7^{7} | 5 | 6
(Spain) Pablo Carreño Busta (Spain) Guillermo García López | 7^{7} | 4 | 6
WC | (Australia) Alex Bolt (Australia) Bradley Mousley | 6^{4} | 6 | 3

Semifinals
WC | (Australia) Marc Polmans (Australia) Andrew Whittington | 4 | 4
4 | (Finland) Henri Kontinen (Australia) John Peers | 6 | 6
3 | (United States) Bob Bryan (United States) Mike Bryan | 7^{7} | 6
(Spain) Pablo Carreño Busta (Spain) Guillermo García López | 6^{1} | 3

Final
4 | (Finland) Henri Kontinen (Australia) John Peers | 7 | 7
3 | (United States) Bob Bryan (United States) Mike Bryan | 5 | 5

=== Top half ===
==== Section 1 ====
First round
1 | (France) P-H Herbert (France) N Mahut | 6 | 6
(France) A Mannarino (Canada) A Shamasdin | 2 | 3
PR | (Poland) J Janowicz (Poland) M Matkowski | 7 | 6
(Italy) F Fognini (Spain) F Verdasco | 5 | 4
(France) J Benneteau (France) J Chardy | 7^{7} | 6
(Poland) M Fyrstenberg (Slovakia) M Kližan | 6^{1} | 1
WC | (Australia) L Saville (Australia) J Thompson | 2 | 5
16 | (United Kingdom) D Inglot (Romania) F Mergea | 6 | 7
11 | (Netherlands) J-J Rojer (Romania) H Tecău | 7^{7} | 7^{7}
(Germany) P Petzschner (Russia) M Youzhny | 6^{5} | 6^{3}
(Netherlands) W Koolhof (Netherlands) M Middelkoop | 6 | 6
(Chile) J Peralta (Argentina) H Zeballos | 4 | 2
(Chinese Taipei) Y-h Lu (Czech Republic) J Veselý | 3 | 2
WC | (Australia) M Polmans (Australia) A Whittington | 6 | 6
(Argentina) A Molteni (Argentina) D Schwartzman | 0 | 4
8 | (Canada) D Nestor (France) É Roger-Vasselin | 6 | 6

Second round
1 | (France) P-H Herbert (France) N Mahut | 6 | 6
PR | (Poland) J Janowicz (Poland) M Matkowski | 3 | 2
(France) J Benneteau (France) J Chardy | 6 | 6^{5} | 6^{2}
16 | (United Kingdom) D Inglot (Romania) F Mergea | 3 | 7^{7} | 7^{7}
11 | (Netherlands) J-J Rojer (Romania) H Tecău | 6 | 6
(Netherlands) W Koolhof (Netherlands) M Middelkoop | 3 | 4
WC | (Australia) M Polmans (Australia) A Whittington | 0 | 6 | 6
8 | (Canada) D Nestor (France) É Roger-Vasselin | 6 | 3 | 4

Third round
1 | (France) P-H Herbert (France) N Mahut | 2 | 7 | 6
16 | (United Kingdom) D Inglot (Romania) F Mergea | 6 | 5 | 2
11 | (Netherlands) J-J Rojer (Romania) H Tecău | 6^{5} | 6^{5}
WC | (Australia) M Polmans (Australia) A Whittington | 7^{7} | 7^{7}

Quarterfinals
1 | (France) P-H Herbert (France) N Mahut | 6^{2} | 6 | 4
WC | (Australia) M Polmans (Australia) A Whittington | 7^{7} | 2 | 6

==== Section 2 ====
First round
4 | (Finland) H Kontinen (Australia) J Peers | 7^{7} | 6
(Mexico) S González (Spain) D Marrero | 6^{1} | 4
(Cyprus) M Baghdatis (Luxembourg) G Müller | 6 | 6
WC | (Chinese Taipei) C-p Hsieh (Chinese Taipei) T-h Yang | 1 | 4
Alt | (Argentina) R Olivo (Argentina) G Pella | 4 | 6 | 3
(Serbia) D Lajović (Serbia) V Troicki | 6 | 3 | 6
Alt | (United Kingdom) K Skupski (United Kingdom) N Skupski | 3 | 4
14 | (Colombia) JS Cabal (Colombia) R Farah | 6 | 6
10 | (Philippines) T Huey (Belarus) M Mirnyi | 4 | 7^{7} | 6
(India) L Paes (Brazil) A Sá | 6 | 6^{3} | 4
WC | (Australia) M Reid (Australia) J-P Smith | 6^{2} | 6 | 6^{3}
(Australia) S Groth (Australia) C Guccione | 7^{7} | 2 | 7^{7}
(Argentina) G Durán (Portugal) J Sousa | 6^{2} | 4
(New Zealand) M Daniell (Brazil) M Demoliner | 7^{7} | 6
(Belarus) A Bury (Italy) P Lorenzi | 3 | 5
6 | (South Africa) R Klaasen (United States) R Ram | 6 | 7

Second round
4 | (Finland) H Kontinen (Australia) J Peers | 6 | 6
(Cyprus) M Baghdatis (Luxembourg) G Müller | 3 | 2
(Serbia) D Lajović (Serbia) V Troicki | 6 | 5 | 0
14 | (Colombia) JS Cabal (Colombia) R Farah | 2 | 7 | 6
10 | (Philippines) T Huey (Belarus) M Mirnyi | 6^{10} | 6^{5}
(Australia) S Groth (Australia) C Guccione | 7^{12} | 7^{7}
(New Zealand) M Daniell (Brazil) M Demoliner | 6 | 7^{7}
6 | (South Africa) R Klaasen (United States) R Ram | 1 | 6^{4}

Third round
4 | (Finland) H Kontinen (Australia) J Peers | 6^{3} | 7^{7} | 7^{7}
14 | (Colombia) JS Cabal (Colombia) R Farah | 7^{7} | 6^{5} | 6^{1}
(Australia) S Groth (Australia) C Guccione | 7^{11} | 6
(New Zealand) M Daniell (Brazil) M Demoliner | 6^{9} | 3

Quarterfinals
4 | (Finland) H Kontinen (Australia) J Peers | 7 | 6
(Australia) S Groth (Australia) C Guccione | 5 | 3

=== Bottom half ===
==== Section 3 ====
First round
7 | (Poland) Ł Kubot (Brazil) M Melo | 7 | 4 | 6
(Sweden) J Brunström (Sweden) A Siljeström | 5 | 6 | 4
(United States) N Monroe (New Zealand) A Sitak | 6 | 7
(United States) J Cerretani (Austria) P Oswald | 3 | 5
(Sweden) R Lindstedt (New Zealand) M Venus | 7^{8} | 7^{7}
PR | (Germany) A Begemann (Germany) J-L Struff | 6^{6} | 6^{2}
(Tunisia) M Jaziri (France) S Robert | 3 | 4
9 | (Croatia) I Dodig (Spain) M Granollers | 6 | 6
13 | (Croatia) M Pavić (Austria) A Peya | 4 | 6 | 5
PR | (Austria) J Melzer (Pakistan) A-u-H Qureshi | 6 | 2 | 7
(Argentina) F Bagnis (Argentina) F Delbonis | 6^{4} | 2
(United States) B Baker (Croatia) N Mektić | 7^{7} | 6
(Germany) D Brown (Spain) A Ramos Viñolas | 6^{5} | 2
(Serbia) N Zimonjić (Germany) M Zverev | 7^{7} | 6
(France) P-H Mathieu (France) B Paire | 3 | 0
3 | (United States) B Bryan (United States) M Bryan | 6 | 6

Second round
7 | (Poland) Ł Kubot (Brazil) M Melo | 6 | 7^{7}
(United States) N Monroe (New Zealand) A Sitak | 4 | 6^{3}
(Sweden) R Lindstedt (New Zealand) M Venus | 6 | 3 | 6^{5}
9 | (Croatia) I Dodig (Spain) M Granollers | 4 | 6 | 7^{7}
PR | (Austria) J Melzer (Pakistan) A-u-H Qureshi | 4 | 3
(United States) B Baker (Croatia) N Mektić | 6 | 6
(Serbia) N Zimonjić (Germany) M Zverev | 3 | 2
3 | (United States) B Bryan (United States) M Bryan | 6 | 6

Third round
7 | (Poland) Ł Kubot (Brazil) M Melo | 6^{5} | 6^{5}
9 | (Croatia) I Dodig (Spain) M Granollers | 7^{7} | 7^{7}
(United States) B Baker (Croatia) N Mektić | 3 | 6^{11}
3 | (United States) B Bryan (United States) M Bryan | 6 | 7^{13}

Quarterfinals
9 | (Croatia) I Dodig (Spain) M Granollers | 6^{5} | 7 | 4
3 | (United States) B Bryan (United States) M Bryan | 7^{7} | 5 | 6

==== Section 4 ====
First round
5 | (Spain) F López (Spain) M López | 6 | 3 | 6
(Ukraine) A Dolgopolov (Austria) G Melzer | 4 | 6 | 4
(France) J Eysseric (France) F Martin | 7^{11} | 7^{7}
(India) P Raja (India) D Sharan | 6^{9} | 6^{4}
(Spain) P Carreño Busta (Spain) G García-López | 6 | 6
WC | (Australia) A De Minaur (Australia) M Purcell | 4 | 2
WC | (Australia) M Barton (Australia) M Ebden | 6 | 6
12 | (Canada) V Pospisil (Czech Republic) R Štěpánek | 2 | 4
15 | (India) R Bopanna (Uruguay) P Cuevas | 6 | 7^{7}
(Brazil) T Bellucci (Argentina) M González | 4 | 6^{4}
(Netherlands) R Haase (Germany) F Mayer | 3 | 7 | 4
WC | (Australia) A Bolt (Australia) B Mousley | 6 | 5 | 6
(Israel) J Erlich (United States) S Lipsky | 4 | 4
(Russia) K Khachanov (Russia) A Kuznetsov | 6 | 6
(United States) S Querrey (United States) D Young | 6 | 7^{7}
2 | (United Kingdom) J Murray (Brazil) B Soares | 3 | 6^{5}

Second round
5 | (Spain) F López (Spain) M López | 6 | 6
(France) J Eysseric (France) F Martin | 4 | 4
(Spain) P Carreño Busta (Spain) G García-López | 3 | 6 | 6
WC | (Australia) M Barton (Australia) M Ebden | 6 | 3 | 4
15 | (India) R Bopanna (Uruguay) P Cuevas | 6 | 6^{2} | 4
WC | (Australia) A Bolt (Australia) B Mousley | 2 | 7^{7} | 6
(Russia) K Khachanov (Russia) A Kuznetsov | 6^{5} | 4
(United States) S Querrey (United States) D Young | 7^{7} | 6

Third round
5 | (Spain) F López (Spain) M López | 6^{6} | 4
(Spain) P Carreño Busta (Spain) G García-López | 7^{8} | 6
WC | (Australia) A Bolt (Australia) B Mousley | 7 | 3 | 7
(United States) S Querrey (United States) D Young | 5 | 6 | 5

Quarterfinals
(Spain) P Carreño Busta (Spain) G García-López | 7^{7} | 4 | 6
WC | (Australia) A Bolt (Australia) B Mousley | 6^{4} | 6 | 3
