= 2017 Australian Open – Men's singles =

Men's singles
- 2017 Australian Open

Final
- Champion: (Switzerland) Roger Federer
- Runner-up: (Spain) Rafael Nadal
- Score: 6–4, 3–6, 6–1, 3–6, 6–3

Details
- Draw: 128 (16Q / 8WC)
- Seeds: 32

Events
Singles	men	women		boys	girls
Doubles	men	women	mixed	boys	girls
WC Singles	men	women	quad
WC Doubles	men	women	quad
Legends	men	women	mixed
- Australian Open

Roger Federer defeated Rafael Nadal in the final, 6–4, 3–6, 6–1, 3–6, 6–3 to win the men's singles tennis title at the 2017 Australian Open. It was his fifth Australian Open title and record-extending 18th major title overall. It was Federer's first major title since the 2012 Wimbledon Championships. Federer, at 35 years, 5 months and 21 days old, was the oldest men's singles major champion since Ken Rosewall at the 1972 Australian Open. It was Nadal and Federer's ninth and last meeting in a major final. This was Nadal's second attempt to become the first man in the Open Era to achieve a double career Grand Slam (he would achieve the feat five years later).

Novak Djokovic was the two-time defending champion, but lost in the second round to Denis Istomin. It was the first time since the 2008 Wimbledon Championships that Djokovic failed to reach the third round of a major, and the first time since 2007 that he failed to reach the quarterfinals at the Australian Open. With top seed Andy Murray losing in the fourth round, this marked the first time since the 2004 French Open that the top two seeds both failed to reach the quarterfinals of a men's singles major. Murray nonetheless retained the world No. 1 ranking after Djokovic lost in the second round.

This marked the first major tournament for future world No. 1 and US Open champion Daniil Medvedev; he lost in the first round to Ernesto Escobedo.

== Seeds ==
1. (United Kingdom) Andy Murray (fourth round)
2. (Serbia) Novak Djokovic (second round)
3. (Canada) Milos Raonic (quarterfinals)
4. (Switzerland) Stan Wawrinka (semifinals)
5. (Japan) Kei Nishikori (fourth round)
6. (France) Gaël Monfils (fourth round)
7. (Croatia) Marin Čilić (second round)
8. (Austria) Dominic Thiem (fourth round)
9. (Spain) Rafael Nadal (final)
10. (Czech Republic) Tomáš Berdych (third round)
11. (Belgium) David Goffin (quarterfinals)
12. (France) Jo-Wilfried Tsonga (quarterfinals)
13. (Spain) Roberto Bautista Agut (fourth round)
14. (Australia) Nick Kyrgios (second round)
15. (Bulgaria) Grigor Dimitrov (semifinals)
16. (France) Lucas Pouille (first round)

17. (Switzerland) Roger Federer (champion)
18. (France) Richard Gasquet (third round)
19. (United States) John Isner (second round)
20. (Croatia) Ivo Karlović (third round)
21. (Spain) David Ferrer (third round)
22. (Uruguay) Pablo Cuevas (first round)
23. (United States) Jack Sock (third round)
24. (Germany) Alexander Zverev (third round)
25. (France) Gilles Simon (third round)
26. (Spain) Albert Ramos-Viñolas (first round)
27. (Australia) Bernard Tomic (third round)
28. (Spain) Feliciano López (first round)
29. (Serbia) Viktor Troicki (third round)
30. (Spain) Pablo Carreño Busta (third round)
31. (United States) Sam Querrey (third round)
32. (Germany) Philipp Kohlschreiber (third round)

Click on the seed number of a player to go to their draw section.

== Draw ==
Key

- Q = Qualifier
- WC = Wild card
- LL = Lucky loser
- Alt = Alternate
- ITF = ITF entry
- PR = Protected ranking
- SR = Special ranking
- SE = Special exempt
- JE = Junior exempt
- JR = Junior Accelerator Programme entrant
- CO = College Accelerator Programme entrant
- NG = Next Gen Accelerator Program entrant
- w/o = Walkover
- r = Retired
- d = Defaulted

=== Finals ===
Quarterfinals
(Germany) Mischa Zverev	1	5	2
17	(Switzerland) Roger Federer	6	7	6
4	(Switzerland) Stan Wawrinka	7^{7}	6	6
12	(France) Jo-Wilfried Tsonga	6^{2}	4	3
9	(Spain) Rafael Nadal	6	7^{9}	6
3	(Canada) Milos Raonic	4	6^{7}	4
11	(Belgium) David Goffin	3	2	4
15	(Bulgaria) Grigor Dimitrov	6	6	6

Semifinals
17	(Switzerland) Roger Federer	7	6	1	4	6
4	(Switzerland) Stan Wawrinka	5	3	6	6	3
9	(Spain) Rafael Nadal	6	5	7^{7}	6^{4}	6
15	(Bulgaria) Grigor Dimitrov	3	7	6^{5}	7^{7}	4

Final
17	(Switzerland) Roger Federer	6	3	6	3	6
9	(Spain) Rafael Nadal	4	6	1	6	3

=== Top half ===
==== Section 1 ====
First round
1	(United Kingdom) A Murray	7	7^{7}	6
(Ukraine) I Marchenko	5	6^{5}	2
Q	(Russia) A Rublev	4	6	7^{7}	6
(Chinese Taipei) Y-h Lu	6	3	6^{0}	3
WC	(Australia) A De Minaur	5	6	2	7^{7}	6
(Austria) G Melzer	7	3	6	6^{2}	1
WC	(France) Q Halys	7^{12}	6^{4}	3	4
31	(United States) S Querrey	6^{10}	7^{7}	6	6
19	(United States) J Isner	6	6	6^{5}	6
(Russia) K Kravchuk	3	4	7^{7}	1
(Spain) G García-López	3	6^{5}	4
(Germany) M Zverev	6	7^{7}	6
(Tunisia) M Jaziri	6	6	6
Q	(Japan) G Soeda	3	4	3
Q	(Kazakhstan) A Bublik	6	3	6	6
16	(France) L Pouille	0	6	3	4

Second round
1	(United Kingdom) A Murray	6	6	6
Q	(Russia) A Rublev	3	0	2
WC	(Australia) A De Minaur	6^{5}	0	1
31	(United States) S Querrey	7^{7}	6	6
19	(United States) J Isner	7^{7}	7^{7}	4	6^{7}	7
(Germany) M Zverev	6^{4}	6^{4}	6	7^{9}	9
(Tunisia) M Jaziri	6	6	7
Q	(Kazakhstan) A Bublik	2	3	5

Third round
1	(United Kingdom) A Murray	6	6	6
31	(United States) S Querrey	4	2	4
(Germany) M Zverev	6	4	6	6
(Tunisia) M Jaziri	1	6	3	0

Fourth round
1	(United Kingdom) A Murray	5	7	2	4
(Germany) M Zverev	7	5	6	6

==== Section 2 ====
First round
10	(Czech Republic) T Berdych	6	0
Q	(Italy) L Vanni	1	0^{r}
(United States) R Harrison	6	6	6
(France) N Mahut	3	4	2
Q	(United States) B Fratangelo	7^{7}	5	6	2	2
Q	(United States) N Rubin	6^{4}	7	3	6	6
Q	(Austria) J Melzer	5	6	2	2
17	(Switzerland) R Federer	7	3	6	6
26	(Spain) A Ramos Viñolas	6	5	6	4	3
Q	(Slovakia) L Lacko	4	7	1	6	6
(Spain) M Granollers	7	3	2	0
(Israel) D Sela	5	6	6	6
(Spain) N Almagro	0^{r}
(France) J Chardy	4
(Russia) A Kuznetsov	7	1	4	7^{8}	2
5	(Japan) K Nishikori	5	6	6	6^{6}	6

Second round
10	(Czech Republic) T Berdych	6	7^{8}	6
(United States) R Harrison	3	6^{6}	2
Q	(United States) N Rubin	5	3	6^{3}
17	(Switzerland) R Federer	7	6	7^{7}
Q	(Slovakia) L Lacko	2	6	6	6
(Israel) D Sela	6	3	2	4
(France) J Chardy	3	4	3
5	(Japan) K Nishikori	6	6	6

Third round
10	(Czech Republic) T Berdych	2	4	4
17	(Switzerland) R Federer	6	6	6
Q	(Slovakia) L Lacko	4	4	4
5	(Japan) K Nishikori	6	6	6

Fourth round
17	(Switzerland) R Federer	6^{4}	6	6	4	6
5	(Japan) K Nishikori	7^{7}	4	1	6	3

==== Section 3 ====
First round
4	(Switzerland) S Wawrinka	4	6	7	4	6
(Slovakia) M Kližan	6	4	5	6	4
(Argentina) F Delbonis	3	4	4
(United States) S Johnson	6	6	6
(Australia) J Duckworth	4	6^{4}	7^{7}	4
(Italy) P Lorenzi	6	7^{7}	6^{4}	6
(Bosnia and Herzegovina) D Džumhur	4	4	6	6	3
29	(Serbia) V Troicki	6	6	2	2	6
22	(Uruguay) P Cuevas	3	3	0
(Argentina) D Schwartzman	6	6	6
(Belgium) S Darcis	3	6	6	6
WC	(Australia) S Groth	6	3	2	2
(France) P-H Mathieu	4	6^{4}	7^{7}	5
(Italy) A Seppi	6	7^{7}	6^{3}	7
(Portugal) G Elias	1	2	2
14	(Australia) N Kyrgios	6	6	6

Second round
4	(Switzerland) S Wawrinka	6	6	6
(United States) S Johnson	3	4	4
(Italy) P Lorenzi	3	6	6^{3}	6	3
29	(Serbia) V Troicki	6	1	7^{7}	3	6
(Argentina) D Schwartzman	3	3	6	4
(Belgium) S Darcis	6	6	2	6
(Italy) A Seppi	1	6^{1}	6	6	10
14	(Australia) N Kyrgios	6	7^{7}	4	2	8

Third round
4	(Switzerland) S Wawrinka	3	6	6	7^{9}
29	(Serbia) V Troicki	6	2	2	6^{7}
(Belgium) S Darcis	6	4	6^{1}	6^{2}
(Italy) A Seppi	4	6	7^{7}	7^{7}

Fourth round
4	(Switzerland) S Wawrinka	7^{7}	7^{7}	7^{7}
(Italy) A Seppi	6^{2}	6^{4}	6^{4}

==== Section 4 ====
First round
12	(France) J-W Tsonga	6	6	6^{5}	6
(Brazil) T Monteiro	1	3	7^{7}	2
(Serbia) D Lajović	6	6	6
(France) S Robert	3	3	3
(Russia) K Khachanov	6	3	7^{11}	6
(France) A Mannarino	4	6	6^{9}	3
(France) P-H Herbert	4	6^{4}	3
23	(United States) J Sock	6	7^{7}	6
27	(Australia) B Tomic	6	6	6
(Brazil) T Bellucci	2	1	4
(Dominican Republic) V Estrella Burgos	7^{9}	7	0	6
(United Kingdom) A Bedene	6^{7}	5	6	3
(Argentina) F Bagnis	6^{8}	3	1
(United Kingdom) D Evans	7^{10}	6	6
PR	(Poland) J Janowicz	6	6	2	2	3
7	(Croatia) M Čilić	4	4	6	6	6

Second round
12	(France) J-W Tsonga	6	6	6
(Serbia) D Lajović	2	2	3
(Russia) K Khachanov	3	4	4
23	(United States) J Sock	6	6	6
27	(Australia) B Tomic	7	7^{7}	4	7^{7}
(Dominican Republic) V Estrella Burgos	5	6^{4}	6	6^{5}
(United Kingdom) D Evans	3	7	6	6
7	(Croatia) M Čilić	6	5	3	3

Third round
12	(France) J-W Tsonga	7^{7}	7	6^{8}	6
23	(United States) J Sock	6^{4}	5	7^{10}	3
27	(Australia) B Tomic	5	6^{2}	6^{3}
(United Kingdom) D Evans	7	7^{7}	7^{7}

Fourth round
12	(France) J-W Tsonga	6^{4}	6	6	6
(United Kingdom) D Evans	7^{7}	2	4	4

=== Bottom half ===
==== Section 5 ====
First round
6	(France) G Monfils	6	6	6
(Czech Republic) J Veselý	2	3	2
(Ukraine) A Dolgopolov	6	6	3	7^{9}
(Croatia) B Ćorić	3	4	6	6^{7}
Q	(Italy) T Fabbiano	4	6^{1}	4
(United States) D Young	6	7^{7}	6
(Georgia (country)) N Basilashvili	4	6	6^{2}	4
32	(Germany) P Kohlschreiber	6	3	7^{7}	6
24	(Germany) A Zverev	6	3	5	6	6
(Netherlands) R Haase	2	6	7	3	2
Q	(United States) F Tiafoe	6	6^{3}	6	6
(Kazakhstan) M Kukushkin	1	7^{7}	3	2
(Russia) M Youzhny	3	0^{r}
(Cyprus) M Baghdatis	6	3
(Germany) F Mayer	3	4	4
9	(Spain) R Nadal	6	6	6

Second round
6	(France) G Monfils	6	6	1	6
(Ukraine) A Dolgopolov	3	4	6	0
(United States) D Young	5	3	0
32	(Germany) P Kohlschreiber	7	6	6
24	(Germany) A Zverev	6	6	6
Q	(United States) F Tiafoe	2	3	4
(Cyprus) M Baghdatis	3	1	3
9	(Spain) R Nadal	6	6	6

Third round
6	(France) G Monfils	6	7^{7}	6
32	(Germany) P Kohlschreiber	3	6^{1}	4
24	(Germany) A Zverev	6	3	7^{7}	3	2
9	(Spain) R Nadal	4	6	6^{5}	6	6

Fourth round
6	(France) G Monfils	3	3	6	4
9	(Spain) R Nadal	6	6	4	6

==== Section 6 ====
First round
13	(Spain) R Bautista Agut	6	6	6
(Argentina) G Pella	3	1	1
(Japan) Y Nishioka	6	1	6	6
Q	(Australia) A Bolt	4	6	2	4
(Russia) D Medvedev	5	6	6^{5}	1
Q	(United States) E Escobedo	7	4	7^{7}	6
WC	(Australia) O Jasika	3	0	2
21	(Spain) D Ferrer	6	6	6
25	(France) G Simon	6	6	6
WC	(United States) M Mmoh	1	3	3
(United States) J Donaldson	6	6	1	4	4
(Brazil) R Dutra Silva	3	0	6	6	6
(Luxembourg) G Müller	7^{8}	7^{7}	6
(United States) T Fritz	6^{6}	6^{5}	3
(Germany) D Brown	3	4	2
3	(Canada) M Raonic	6	6	6

Second round
13	(Spain) R Bautista Agut	6	6	6
(Japan) Y Nishioka	2	3	3
Q	(United States) E Escobedo	6	4	4	2
21	(Spain) D Ferrer	2	6	6	6
25	(France) G Simon	6	6	6
(Brazil) R Dutra Silva	4	1	1
(Luxembourg) G Müller	3	4	6^{4}
3	(Canada) M Raonic	6	6	7^{7}

Third round
13	(Spain) R Bautista Agut	7	6^{6}	7^{7}	6
21	(Spain) D Ferrer	5	7^{8}	6^{3}	4
25	(France) G Simon	2	6^{5}	6	3
3	(Canada) M Raonic	6	7^{7}	3	6

Fourth round
13	(Spain) R Bautista Agut	6^{6}	6	4	1
3	(Canada) M Raonic	7^{8}	3	6	6

==== Section 7 ====
First round
8	(Austria) D Thiem	4	6	6	6
(Germany) J-L Struff	6	4	4	3
(Australia) J Thompson	6^{2}	4	6	6	6
(Portugal) J Sousa	7^{7}	6	3	2	1
PR	(Germany) T Haas	6^{2}	4	0^{r}
(France) B Paire	7^{7}	6	0
(Italy) F Fognini	7	6	7
28	(Spain) F López	5	3	5
20	(Croatia) I Karlović	6^{6}	3	7	6	22
(Argentina) H Zeballos	7^{8}	6	5	2	20
(Czech Republic) A Pavlásek	4	6	2	3
WC	(Australia) A Whittington	6	4	6	6
PR	(Russia) D Tursunov	2	6^{1}	3
Q	(Czech Republic) R Štěpánek	6	7^{7}	6
Q	(United States) R Opelka	4	6	2	6	4
11	(Belgium) D Goffin	6	4	6	4	6

Second round
8	(Austria) D Thiem	6	6	6^{6}	6
(Australia) J Thompson	2	1	7^{8}	4
(France) B Paire	7^{7}	4	6	3	6
(Italy) F Fognini	6^{3}	6	3	6	3
20	(Croatia) I Karlović	6	6	6
WC	(Australia) A Whittington	4	4	4
Q	(Czech Republic) R Štěpánek	4	0	3
11	(Belgium) D Goffin	6	6	6

Third round
8	(Austria) D Thiem	6	4	6	6
(France) B Paire	1	6	4	4
20	(Croatia) I Karlović	3	2	4
11	(Belgium) D Goffin	6	6	6

Fourth round
8	(Austria) D Thiem	7	6^{4}	2	2
11	(Belgium) D Goffin	5	7^{7}	6	6

==== Section 8 ====
First round
15	(Bulgaria) G Dimitrov	7^{7}	6	6
WC	(Australia) C O'Connell	6^{2}	3	3
(South Korea) H Chung	6	6	6
(Argentina) R Olivo	2	3	2
(Moldova) R Albot	4	6^{4}	7	6^{8}
(Argentina) C Berlocq	6	7^{7}	5	7^{10}
Q	(Australia) B Mott	4	4	2
18	(France) R Gasquet	6	6	6
30	(Spain) P Carreño Busta	6	3	3	6	3
LL	(Canada) P Polansky	0	6	6	2	0^{r}
(United Kingdom) K Edmund	6	7	6
(Colombia) S Giraldo	2	5	3
WC	(Uzbekistan) D Istomin	6	6	3	7
Q	(Croatia) I Dodig	1	4	6	5
(Spain) F Verdasco	1	6^{4}	2
2	(Serbia) N Djokovic	6	7^{7}	6

Second round
15	(Bulgaria) G Dimitrov	1	6	6	6
(South Korea) H Chung	6	4	4	4
(Argentina) C Berlocq	1	1	1
18	(France) R Gasquet	6	6	6
30	(Spain) P Carreño Busta	6	6	6
(United Kingdom) K Edmund	2	4	2
WC	(Uzbekistan) D Istomin	7^{10}	5	2	7^{7}	6
2	(Serbia) N Djokovic	6^{8}	7	6	6^{5}	4

Third round
15	(Bulgaria) G Dimitrov	6	6	6
18	(France) R Gasquet	3	2	4
30	(Spain) P Carreño Busta	4	6	4	6	2
WC	(Uzbekistan) D Istomin	6	4	6	4	6

Fourth round
15	(Bulgaria) G Dimitrov	2	7^{7}	6	6
WC	(Uzbekistan) D Istomin	6	6^{2}	2	1

== Seeded players ==
The following are the seeded players and notable players who withdrew from the event. Seeding are arranged according to rankings on 9 January 2017, while ranking and points before are as of 16 January 2017.

Seed	Rank	Player	Points before	Points defending	Points won	Points after	Status
1	1	(United Kingdom) Andy Murray	12,560	1,200	180	11,540	Fourth round lost to (Germany) Mischa Zverev
2	2	(Serbia) Novak Djokovic	11,780	2,000	45	9,825	Second round lost to (Uzbekistan) Denis Istomin [WC]
3	3	(Canada) Milos Raonic	5,290	720	360	4,930	Quarter-finals lost to (Spain) Rafael Nadal [9]
4	4	(Switzerland) Stan Wawrinka	5,155	180	720	5,695	Semi-finals lost to (Switzerland) Roger Federer [17]
5	5	(Japan) Kei Nishikori	5,010	360	180	4,830	Fourth round lost to (Switzerland) Roger Federer [17]
6	6	(France) Gaël Monfils	3,625	360	180	3,445	Fourth round lost to (Spain) Rafael Nadal [9]
7	7	(Croatia) Marin Čilić	3,605	90	45	3,560	Second round lost to (United Kingdom) Daniel Evans
8	8	(Austria) Dominic Thiem	3,415	90	180	3,505	Fourth round lost to (Belgium) David Goffin [11]
9	9	(Spain) Rafael Nadal	3,195	10	1,200	4,385	Runner-up, lost to (Switzerland) Roger Federer [17]
10	10	(Czech Republic) Tomáš Berdych	3,060	360	90	2,790	Third round lost to (Switzerland) Roger Federer [17]
11	11	(Belgium) David Goffin	2,750	180	360	2,930	Quarter-finals lost to (Bulgaria) Grigor Dimitrov [15]
12	12	(France) Jo-Wilfried Tsonga	2,505	180	360	2,685	Quarter-finals lost to (Switzerland) Stan Wawrinka [4]
13	14	(Spain) Roberto Bautista Agut	2,350	180	180	2,350	Fourth round lost to (Canada) Milos Raonic [3]
14	13	(Australia) Nick Kyrgios	2,460	90	45	2,415	Second round lost to (Italy) Andreas Seppi
15	15	(Bulgaria) Grigor Dimitrov	2,135	90	720	2,765	Semi-finals lost to (Spain) Rafael Nadal [9]
16	16	(France) Lucas Pouille	2,131	10	10	2,131	First round lost to (Kazakhstan) Alexander Bublik [Q]
17	17	(Switzerland) Roger Federer	1,980	720	2,000	3,260	Champion, defeated (Spain) Rafael Nadal [9]
18	18	(France) Richard Gasquet	1,885	0	90	1,975	Third round lost to (Bulgaria) Grigor Dimitrov [15]
19	19	(United States) John Isner	1,850	180	45	1,715	Second round lost to (Germany) Mischa Zverev
20	21	(Croatia) Ivo Karlović	1,795	10	90	1,875	Third round lost to (Belgium) David Goffin [11]
21	23	(Spain) David Ferrer	1,740	360	90	1,470	Third round lost to (Spain) Roberto Bautista Agut [13]
22	22	(Uruguay) Pablo Cuevas	1,780	45	10	1,745	First round lost to (Argentina) Diego Schwartzman
23	20	(United States) Jack Sock	1,810	45	90	1,855	Third round lost to (France) Jo-Wilfried Tsonga [12]
24	24	(Germany) Alexander Zverev	1,655	10	90	1,735	Third round lost to (Spain) Rafael Nadal [9]
25	25	(France) Gilles Simon	1,585	180	90	1,495	Third round lost to (Canada) Milos Raonic [3]
26	26	(Spain) Albert Ramos Viñolas	1,435	45	10	1,400	First round lost to (Slovakia) Lukáš Lacko [Q]
27	27	(Australia) Bernard Tomic	1,420	180	90	1,330	Third round lost to (United Kingdom) Daniel Evans
28	29	(Spain) Feliciano López	1,410	90	10	1,330	First round lost to (Italy) Fabio Fognini
29	35	(Serbia) Viktor Troicki	1,225	90	90	1,225	Third round lost to (Switzerland) Stan Wawrinka [4]
30	31	(Spain) Pablo Carreño Busta	1,370	10	90	1,450	Third round lost to (Uzbekistan) Denis Istomin [WC]
31	32	(United States) Sam Querrey	1,355	10	90	1,435	Third round lost to (United Kingdom) Andy Murray [1]
32	33	(Germany) Philipp Kohlschreiber	1,325	10	90	1,405	Third round lost to (France) Gaël Monfils [6]

== Other entry information ==
=== Wildcards ===
- (Australia) Alex de Minaur
- (Australia) Sam Groth
- (France) Quentin Halys
- (Uzbekistan) Denis Istomin
- (Australia) Omar Jasika
- (United States) Michael Mmoh
- (Australia) Christopher O'Connell
- (Australia) Andrew Whittington

=== Protected ranking ===
- (Germany) Tommy Haas (25)
- (Russia) Dmitry Tursunov (89)
- (Poland) Jerzy Janowicz (94)

=== Qualifiers ===
- (Australia) Alex Bolt
- (Kazakhstan) Alexander Bublik
- (Croatia) Ivan Dodig
- (United States) Ernesto Escobedo
- (Italy) Thomas Fabbiano
- (United States) Bjorn Fratangelo
- (Slovakia) Lukáš Lacko
- (Austria) Jürgen Melzer
- (Australia) Blake Mott
- (United States) Reilly Opelka
- (United States) Noah Rubin
- (Russia) Andrey Rublev
- (Japan) Go Soeda
- (Czech Republic) Radek Štěpánek
- (United States) Frances Tiafoe
- (Italy) Luca Vanni

=== Lucky losers ===
- (Canada) Peter Polansky

=== Withdrawals ===
- ‡ (Argentina) Juan Mónaco (65) → replaced by (Japan) Yoshihito Nishioka (100)
- ‡ (Argentina) Juan Martín del Potro (38) → replaced by (United Kingdom) Aljaž Bedene (101)
- ‡ (Lithuania) Ričardas Berankis (92) → replaced by (Dominican Republic) Víctor Estrella Burgos (102)
- ‡ (Spain) Tommy Robredo (57 PR) → replaced by (Australia) James Duckworth (103)
- ‡ (South Africa) Kevin Anderson (67) → replaced by (South Korea) Chung Hyeon (104)
- ‡ (Australia) John Millman (84) → replaced by (United States) Jared Donaldson (105) (Note: Last direct acceptance)
- † (Australia) Thanasi Kokkinakis (81 PR) → replaced by (Canada) Peter Polansky (LL)

‡ – withdrew from entry list before qualifying began
† – withdrew from entry list after qualifying began

=== Retirements ===
- (Spain) Nicolás Almagro
- (Germany) Tommy Haas
- (Canada) Peter Polansky
- (Italy) Luca Vanni
- (Russia) Mikhail Youzhny

== Notes ==
Preceded by 2016 US Open – Men's singles	Grand Slam men's singles	Succeeded by 2017 French Open – Men's singles
