= 2017 Australian Open – Women's singles =

Women's singles
- 2017 Australian Open

Final
- Champion: (United States) Serena Williams
- Runner-up: (United States) Venus Williams
- Score: 6–4, 6–4

Details
- Draw: 128 (12Q / 8WC)
- Seeds: 32

Events
Singles	men	women		boys	girls
Doubles	men	women	mixed	boys	girls
WC Singles	men	women	quad
WC Doubles	men	women	quad
Legends	men	women	mixed
- Australian Open

Serena Williams defeated her sister Venus Williams in the final, 6–4, 6–4 to win the women's singles tennis title at the 2017 Australian Open. It was her seventh Australian Open singles title and her 23rd and last major singles title overall, surpassing Steffi Graf's Open Era record for women's singles major titles. Serena did not lose a set during the tournament. This marked the Williams sisters' ninth and last meeting in a major final. With the win, Serena regained the world No. 1 singles ranking, and remains the oldest woman in the Open Era to win a singles major, aged 35 years and four months. Serena was roughly eight weeks pregnant with her first daughter, Alexis Olympia Ohanian Jr., by the end of the tournament. It was Venus' first major final since the 2009 Wimbledon Championships.

Angelique Kerber was the defending champion, but lost in the fourth round to CoCo Vandeweghe.

Mirjana Lučić-Baroni reached her second major semifinal over 17 years after her first, at the 1999 Wimbledon Championships. b Lučić-Baroni played 22-time grand slam singles champion Steffi Graf in her first grand slam semifinal at Wimbledon in 1999, and would go on to play 22-time grand slam singles champion Serena Williams in her second grand slam semifinal at the 2017 Australian Open.

== Seeds ==
1. (Germany) Angelique Kerber (fourth round)
2. (United States) Serena Williams (champion)
3. (Poland) Agnieszka Radwańska (second round)
4. (Romania) Simona Halep (first round)
5. (Czech Republic) Karolína Plíšková (quarterfinals)
6. (Slovakia) Dominika Cibulková (third round)
7. (Spain) Garbiñe Muguruza (quarterfinals)
8. (Russia) Svetlana Kuznetsova (fourth round)
9. (United Kingdom) Johanna Konta (quarterfinals)
10. (Spain) Carla Suárez Navarro (second round)
11. (Ukraine) Elina Svitolina (third round)
12. (Switzerland) Timea Bacsinszky (third round)
13. (United States) Venus Williams (final)
14. (Russia) Elena Vesnina (third round)
15. (Italy) Roberta Vinci (first round)
16. (Czech Republic) Barbora Strýcová (fourth round)

17. (Denmark) Caroline Wozniacki (third round)
18. (Australia) Samantha Stosur (first round)
19. (Netherlands) Kiki Bertens (first round)
20. (China) Zhang Shuai (second round)
21. (France) Caroline Garcia (third round)
22. (Australia) Daria Gavrilova (fourth round)
23. (Russia) Daria Kasatkina (first round)
24. (Russia) Anastasia Pavlyuchenkova (quarterfinals)
25. (Hungary) Tímea Babos (first round)
26. (Germany) Laura Siegemund (first round)
27. (Romania) Irina-Camelia Begu (second round)
28. (France) Alizé Cornet (second round)
29. (Puerto Rico) Monica Puig (second round)
30. (Russia) Ekaterina Makarova (fourth round)
31. (Kazakhstan) Yulia Putintseva (second round)
32. (Latvia) Anastasija Sevastova (third round)

Click on the seed number of a player to go to their draw section.

== Draw ==
Key

- Q = Qualifier
- WC = Wild card
- LL = Lucky loser
- Alt = Alternate
- ITF = ITF entry
- PR = Protected ranking
- SR = Special ranking
- SE = Special exempt
- JE = Junior exempt
- JR = Junior Accelerator Programme entrant
- CO = College Accelerator Programme entrant
- NG = Next Gen Accelerator Program entrant
- w/o = Walkover
- r = Retired
- d = Defaulted

=== Finals ===
Quarterfinals
(United States) CoCo Vandeweghe	6	6
7	(Spain) Garbiñe Muguruza	4	0
13	(United States) Venus Williams	6	7^{7}
24	(Russia) Anastasia Pavlyuchenkova	4	6^{3}
5	(Czech Republic) Karolína Plíšková	4	6	4
(Croatia) Mirjana Lučić-Baroni	6	3	6
9	(United Kingdom) Johanna Konta	2	3
2	(United States) Serena Williams	6	6

Semifinals
(United States) CoCo Vandeweghe	7^{7}	2	3
13	(United States) Venus Williams	6^{3}	6	6
(Croatia) Mirjana Lučić-Baroni	2	1
2	(United States) Serena Williams	6	6

Final
13	(United States) Venus Williams	4	4
2	(United States) Serena Williams	6	6

=== Top half ===
==== Section 1 ====
First round
1	(Germany) A Kerber	6	5	6
(Ukraine) L Tsurenko	2	7	2
Q	(Japan) E Hozumi	5	6^{6}
(Germany) C Witthöft	7	7^{8}
(Czech Republic) Kr Plíšková	6	2	6
(Switzerland) V Golubic	3	6	4
(Kazakhstan) Y Shvedova	7	3	4
27	(Romania) I-C Begu	5	6	6
23	(Russia) D Kasatkina	0	6^{5}
(China) S Peng	6	7^{7}
(United States) L Chirico	0	4
(Canada) E Bouchard	6	6
(France) P Parmentier	7	7
(Japan) M Doi	5	5
(United States) C Vandeweghe	6	7^{7}
15	(Italy) R Vinci	1	6^{3}

Second round
1	(Germany) A Kerber	6	6^{3}	6
(Germany) C Witthöft	2	7^{7}	2
(Czech Republic) Kr Plíšková	6	7^{10}
27	(Romania) I-C Begu	4	6^{8}
(China) S Peng	6^{5}	2
(Canada) E Bouchard	7^{7}	6
(France) P Parmentier	4	6^{5}
(United States) C Vandeweghe	6	7^{7}

Third round
1	(Germany) A Kerber	6	6
(Czech Republic) Kr Plíšková	0	4
(Canada) E Bouchard	4	6	5
(United States) C Vandeweghe	6	3	7

Fourth round
1	(Germany) A Kerber	2	3
(United States) C Vandeweghe	6	6

==== Section 2 ====
First round
10	(Spain) C Suárez Navarro	6	6
(Slovakia) J Čepelová	2	2
(Russia) I Khromacheva	2	1
(Romania) S Cîrstea	6	6
(United States) A Riske	7	6
(United States) M Brengle	5	3
Q	(Belarus) A Sasnovich	0	3
20	(China) S Zhang	6	6
32	(Latvia) A Sevastova	6	0
(Japan) N Hibino	4	0^{r}
(Slovakia) K Kučová	6	6
(United States) C McHale	4	0
(United States) S Crawford	4	6	6
(United States) L Davis	6	3	0
(New Zealand) M Erakovic	5	4
7	(Spain) G Muguruza	7	6

Second round
10	(Spain) C Suárez Navarro	6^{1}	3
(Romania) S Cîrstea	7^{7}	6
(United States) A Riske	7^{9}	4	6
20	(China) S Zhang	6^{7}	6	1
32	(Latvia) A Sevastova	6	6
(Slovakia) K Kučová	3	4
(United States) S Crawford	5	4
7	(Spain) G Muguruza	7	6

Third round
(Romania) S Cîrstea	6	7^{7}
(United States) A Riske	2	6^{2}
32	(Latvia) A Sevastova	4	2
7	(Spain) G Muguruza	6	6

Fourth round
(Romania) S Cîrstea	2	3
7	(Spain) G Muguruza	6	6

==== Section 3 ====
First round
4	(Romania) S Halep	3	1
(United States) S Rogers	6	6
WC	(Australia) A Barty	6	7
(Germany) A Beck	4	5
Q	(Germany) M Barthel	6	7^{7}
WC	(Australia) D Aiava	3	6^{4}
(Romania) PM Țig	0	1
29	(Puerto Rico) M Puig	6	6
19	(Netherlands) K Bertens	5	6^{5}
(United States) V Lepchenko	7	7^{7}
(China) Y Duan	6	6
Q	(Slovakia) R Šramková	3	4
Q	(Switzerland) S Vögele	2	6	6
(Japan) K Nara	6	2	3
(Ukraine) K Kozlova	6^{5}	5
13	(United States) V Williams	7^{7}	7

Second round
(United States) S Rogers	5	1
WC	(Australia) A Barty	7	6
Q	(Germany) M Barthel	6	6
29	(Puerto Rico) M Puig	4	4
(United States) V Lepchenko	1	6	8
(China) Y Duan	6	3	10
Q	(Switzerland) S Vögele	3	2
13	(United States) V Williams	6	6

Third round
WC	(Australia) A Barty	4	6	3
Q	(Germany) M Barthel	6	3	6
(China) Y Duan	1	0
13	(United States) V Williams	6	6

Fourth round
Q	(Germany) M Barthel	3	5
13	(United States) V Williams	6	7

==== Section 4 ====
First round
11	(Ukraine) E Svitolina	6	6
PR	(Kazakhstan) G Voskoboeva	0	2
(Italy) F Schiavone	2	4
Q	(United States) J Boserup	6	6
(United States) V King	3	2
Q	(Russia) N Vikhlyantseva	6	6
(Russia) E Rodina	1	6^{2}
24	(Russia) A Pavlyuchenkova	6	7^{7}
26	(Germany) L Siegemund	1	6	4
(Serbia) J Janković	6	1	6
(Czech Republic) K Siniaková	6	3	4
(Germany) J Görges	3	6	6
PR	(United States) A Tatishvili	4	3
WC	(Australia) J Fourlis	6	6
(Colombia) M Duque Mariño	0	1
8	(Russia) S Kuznetsova	6	6

Second round
11	(Ukraine) E Svitolina	6	6
Q	(United States) J Boserup	4	1
Q	(Russia) N Vikhlyantseva	2	2
24	(Russia) A Pavlyuchenkova	6	6
(Serbia) J Janković	6	6
(Germany) J Görges	3	4
WC	(Australia) J Fourlis	2	1
8	(Russia) S Kuznetsova	6	6

Third round
11	(Ukraine) E Svitolina	5	6	3
24	(Russia) A Pavlyuchenkova	7	4	6
(Serbia) J Janković	4	7	7
8	(Russia) S Kuznetsova	6	5	9

Fourth round
24	(Russia) A Pavlyuchenkova	6	6
8	(Russia) S Kuznetsova	3	3

=== Bottom half ===
==== Section 5 ====
First round
5	(Czech Republic) Ka Plíšková	6	6
(Spain) S Sorribes Tormo	2	0
Q	(Russia) A Blinkova	6	4	6
(Romania) M Niculescu	2	6	4
Q	(China) L Zhu	4	0
(Latvia) J Ostapenko	6	6
(Spain) L Arruabarrena	6^{7}	6^{10}
31	(Kazakhstan) Y Putintseva	7^{9}	7^{12}
22	(Australia) D Gavrilova	3	6	7
(United Kingdom) N Broady	6	4	5
(Croatia) A Konjuh	6	6
(France) K Mladenovic	4	2
(Montenegro) D Kovinić	6	6
(China) S Zheng	0	4
(Italy) C Giorgi	4	6	5
12	(Switzerland) T Bacsinszky	6	3	7

Second round
5	(Czech Republic) Ka Plíšková	6	6
Q	(Russia) A Blinkova	0	2
(Latvia) J Ostapenko	6	6
31	(Kazakhstan) Y Putintseva	3	1
22	(Australia) D Gavrilova	6	1	6
(Croatia) A Konjuh	2	6	4
(Montenegro) D Kovinić	1	6^{5}
12	(Switzerland) T Bacsinszky	6	7^{7}

Third round
5	(Czech Republic) Ka Plíšková	4	6	10
(Latvia) J Ostapenko	6	0	8
22	(Australia) D Gavrilova	6	5	6
12	(Switzerland) T Bacsinszky	3	7	4

Fourth round
5	(Czech Republic) Ka Plíšková	6	6
22	(Australia) D Gavrilova	3	3

==== Section 6 ====
First round
14	(Russia) E Vesnina	7	6
Q	(Romania) A Bogdan	5	2
(Luxembourg) M Minella	7	6
(Poland) M Linette	5	4
Q	(United States) J Brady	6	6
LL	(Belgium) M Zanevska	3	2
(United Kingdom) H Watson	6	3	6
18	(Australia) S Stosur	3	6	0
28	(France) A Cornet	6	4	6
WC	(France) M Georges	3	6	1
(Greece) M Sakkari	6	6
(Estonia) A Kontaveit	0	4
(Croatia) M Lučić-Baroni	4	6	6
(China) Q Wang	6	3	4
(Bulgaria) T Pironkova	1	6	1
3	(Poland) A Radwańska	6	4	6

Second round
14	(Russia) E Vesnina	6	6
(Luxembourg) M Minella	3	3
Q	(United States) J Brady	2	7^{7}	10
(United Kingdom) H Watson	6	6^{3}	8
28	(France) A Cornet	5	6	1
(Greece) M Sakkari	7	4	6
(Croatia) M Lučić-Baroni	6	6
3	(Poland) A Radwańska	3	2

Third round
14	(Russia) E Vesnina	6^{4}	2
Q	(United States) J Brady	7^{7}	6
(Greece) M Sakkari	6	2	3
(Croatia) M Lučić-Baroni	3	6	6

Fourth round
Q	(United States) J Brady	4	2
(Croatia) M Lučić-Baroni	6	6

==== Section 7 ====
First round
6	(Slovakia) D Cibulková	7	6
(Czech Republic) D Allertová	5	2
PR	(Italy) K Knapp	3	0^{r}
(Chinese Taipei) S-w Hsieh	6	2
(Italy) S Errani	7	6
(Japan) R Ozaki	5	1
(Russia) E Alexandrova	0	6	1
30	(Russia) E Makarova	6	4	6
17	(Denmark) C Wozniacki	6	6
WC	(Australia) Ar Rodionova	1	2
(Croatia) D Vekić	7	6
WC	(Australia) L Cabrera	5	2
WC	(Thailand) L Kumkhum	7^{7}	4	5
(Japan) N Osaka	6^{2}	6	7
(Belgium) K Flipkens	5	2
9	(United Kingdom) J Konta	7	6

Second round
6	(Slovakia) D Cibulková	6	7^{10}
(Chinese Taipei) S-w Hsieh	4	6^{8}
(Italy) S Errani	2	2^{r}
30	(Russia) E Makarova	6	3
17	(Denmark) C Wozniacki	6	6
(Croatia) D Vekić	1	3
(Japan) N Osaka	4	2
9	(United Kingdom) J Konta	6	6

Third round
6	(Slovakia) D Cibulková	2	7^{7}	3
30	(Russia) E Makarova	6	6^{3}	6
17	(Denmark) C Wozniacki	3	1
9	(United Kingdom) J Konta	6	6

Fourth round
30	(Russia) E Makarova	1	4
9	(United Kingdom) J Konta	6	6

==== Section 8 ====
First round
16	(Czech Republic) B Strýcová	6	6
Q	(Russia) E Kulichkova	3	2
WC	(United States) K Day	3	2
(Germany) A Petkovic	6	6
(Turkey) Ç Büyükakçay	5	7^{7}	2
(France) O Dodin	7	6^{1}	6
(Ukraine) K Bondarenko	6^{4}	4
21	(France) C Garcia	7^{7}	6
25	(Hungary) T Babos	6^{3}	4
(United States) N Gibbs	7^{7}	6
(United States) I Falconi	6	7
(China) X Han	1	5
(Belgium) Y Wickmayer	6	6^{7}	1
(Czech Republic) L Šafářová	3	7^{9}	6
(Switzerland) B Bencic	4	3
2	(United States) S Williams	6	6

Second round
16	(Czech Republic) B Strýcová	6	7
(Germany) A Petkovic	0	5
(France) O Dodin	7^{7}	4	4
21	(France) C Garcia	6^{3}	6	6
(United States) N Gibbs	6	6
(United States) I Falconi	4	1
(Czech Republic) L Šafářová	3	4
2	(United States) S Williams	6	6

Third round
16	(Czech Republic) B Strýcová	6	7
21	(France) C Garcia	2	5
(United States) N Gibbs	1	3
2	(United States) S Williams	6	6

Fourth round
16	(Czech Republic) B Strýcová	5	4
2	(United States) S Williams	7	6

== Seeded players ==
The following are the seeded players and notable players who withdrew from the event. Seeding are arranged according to rankings on 9 January 2017, while ranking and points before are as of 16 January 2017.

Seed	Rank	Player	Points before	Points defending	Points won	Points after	Status
1	1	(Germany) Angelique Kerber	8,875	2,000	240	7,115	Fourth round lost to (United States) CoCo Vandeweghe
2	2	(United States) Serena Williams	7,080	1,300	2,000	7,780	Champion, defeated (United States) Venus Williams [13]
3	3	(Poland) Agnieszka Radwańska	5,625	780	70	4,915	Second round lost to (Croatia) Mirjana Lučić-Baroni
4	4	(Romania) Simona Halep	5,073	10	10	5,073	First round lost to (United States) Shelby Rogers
5	5	(Czech Republic) Karolína Plíšková	4,970	130	430	5,270	Quarter-finals lost to (Croatia) Mirjana Lučić-Baroni
6	6	(Slovakia) Dominika Cibulková	4,865	10	130	4,985	Third round lost to (Russia) Ekaterina Makarova [30]
7	7	(Spain) Garbiñe Muguruza	4,420	130	430	4,720	Quarter-finals lost to (United States) CoCo Vandeweghe
8	10	(Russia) Svetlana Kuznetsova	3,745	70	240	3,915	Fourth round lost to (Russia) Anastasia Pavlyuchenkova [24]
9	9	(United Kingdom) Johanna Konta	4,055	780	430	3,705	Quarter-finals lost to (United States) Serena Williams [2]
10	12	(Spain) Carla Suárez Navarro	2,985	430	70	2,625	Second round lost to (Romania) Sorana Cîrstea
11	13	(Ukraine) Elina Svitolina	2,895	70	130	2,955	Third round lost to (Russia) Anastasia Pavlyuchenkova [24]
12	15	(Switzerland) Timea Bacsinszky	2,347	70	130	2,407	Third round lost to (Australia) Daria Gavrilova [22]
13	17	(United States) Venus Williams	2,240	10	1,300	3,530	Runner-up, lost to (United States) Serena Williams [2]
14	18	(Russia) Elena Vesnina	2,229	2	130	2,357	Third round lost to (United States) Jennifer Brady [Q]
15	19	(Italy) Roberta Vinci	2,210	130	10	2,090	First round lost to (United States) CoCo Vandeweghe
16	16	(Czech Republic) Barbora Strýcová	2,295	240	240	2,295	Fourth round lost to (United States) Serena Williams [2]
17	20	(Denmark) Caroline Wozniacki	2,175	10	130	2,295	Third round lost to (United Kingdom) Johanna Konta [9]
18	21	(Australia) Samantha Stosur	2,016	10	10	2,016	First round lost to (United Kingdom) Heather Watson
19	22	(Netherlands) Kiki Bertens	1,956	10	10	1,956	First round lost to (United States) Varvara Lepchenko
20	23	(China) Zhang Shuai	1,885	470	70	1,485	Second round lost to (United States) Alison Riske
21	24	(France) Caroline Garcia	1,765	10	130	1,885	Third round lost to (Czech Republic) Barbora Strýcová [16]
22	26	(Australia) Daria Gavrilova	1,665	240	240	1,665	Fourth round lost to (Czech Republic) Karolína Plíšková [5]
23	25	(Russia) Daria Kasatkina	1,700	130	10	1,580	First round lost to (China) Peng Shuai
24	27	(Russia) Anastasia Pavlyuchenkova	1,620	10	430	2,040	Quarter-finals lost to (United States) Venus Williams [13]
25	28	(Hungary) Tímea Babos	1,545	70	10	1,485	First round lost to (United States) Nicole Gibbs
26	30	(Germany) Laura Siegemund	1,502	130	10	1,382	First round lost to (Serbia) Jelena Janković
27	29	(Romania) Irina-Camelia Begu	1,502	10	70	1,562	Second round lost to (Czech Republic) Kristýna Plíšková
28	43	(France) Alizé Cornet	1,242	70	70	1,242	Second round lost to (Greece) Maria Sakkari
29	46	(Puerto Rico) Monica Puig	1,215	130	70	1,155	Second round lost to (Germany) Mona Barthel [Q]
30	34	(Russia) Ekaterina Makarova	1,377	240	240	1,377	Fourth round lost to (United Kingdom) Johanna Konta [9]
31	31	(Kazakhstan) Yulia Putintseva	1,450	130	70	1,390	Second round lost to (Latvia) Jeļena Ostapenko
32	33	(Latvia) Anastasija Sevastova	1,425	110	130	1,445	Third round lost to (Spain) Garbiñe Muguruza [7]

The following players would have been seeded, but they withdrew or not entered from the event.

Rank	Player	Points before	Points defending	Points after	Withdrawal reason
8	(United States) Madison Keys	4,137	240	3,897	Wrist injury
11	(Czech Republic) Petra Kvitová	3,485	70	3,415	Off-court injury
14	(Belarus) Victoria Azarenka	2,591	430	2,161	Maternity

== Other entry information ==
=== Wildcards ===
- (Australia) Destanee Aiava
- (Australia) Ashleigh Barty
- (Australia) Lizette Cabrera
- (United States) Kayla Day
- (Australia) Jaimee Fourlis
- (France) Myrtille Georges
- (Thailand) Luksika Kumkhum
- (Australia) Arina Rodionova

=== Protected ranking ===
- (Italy) Karin Knapp (45)
- (Kazakhstan) Galina Voskoboeva (64)
- (United States) Anna Tatishvili (107)

=== Qualifiers ===
- (Germany) Mona Barthel
- (Russia) Anna Blinkova
- (Romania) Ana Bogdan
- (United States) Julia Boserup
- (United States) Jennifer Brady
- (Japan) Eri Hozumi
- (Russia) Elizaveta Kulichkova
- (Belarus) Aliaksandra Sasnovich
- (Slovakia) Rebecca Šramková
- (Russia) Natalia Vikhlyantseva
- (Switzerland) Stefanie Vögele
- (China) Zhu Lin

=== Lucky losers ===
- (Belgium) Maryna Zanevska

=== Withdrawals ===
- † (Belarus) Victoria Azarenka (13) → replaced by (Romania) Patricia Maria Țig (107)
- ‡ (Germany) Anna-Lena Friedsam (67) → replaced by (United States) Anna Tatishvili (107 PR)
- ‡ (Czech Republic) Petra Kvitová (11) → replaced by (Chinese Taipei) Hsieh Su-wei (108)
- ‡ (United States) Madison Keys (8) → replaced by (Russia) Ekaterina Alexandrova (109)
- ‡ (Serbia) Ana Ivanovic (63) (Note: Retirement from tennis) → replaced by (Colombia) Mariana Duque Mariño (110)
- ‡ (Germany) Sabine Lisicki (92) → replaced by (China) Han Xinyun (111)
- ‡ (United States) Catherine Bellis (75) → replaced by (Estonia) Anett Kontaveit (112)
- ‡ (United States) Sloane Stephens (35) → replaced by (United States) Samantha Crawford (113) (Note: Last direct acceptance)
- § (Sweden) Johanna Larsson (50) → replaced by (Belgium) Maryna Zanevska (LL)

† – not included on entry list
‡ – withdrew from entry list
§ – withdrew from main draw

=== Retirements ===
- (Italy) Sara Errani
- (Japan) Nao Hibino
- (Italy) Karin Knapp

== Championship match statistics ==
Category	(United States) S. Williams	(United States) V. Williams
1st serve %	37/61 (61%)	46/67 (69%)
1st serve points won	28 of 37 = 76%	31 of 46 = 67%
2nd serve points won	11 of 24 = 46%	6 of 21 = 29%
Total service points won	39 of 61 = 63.93%	37 of 67 = 55.22%
Aces	10	7
Double faults	5	3
Winners	27	21
Unforced errors	23	25
Net points won	6 of 7 = 86%	6 of 10 = 60%
Break points converted	4 of 11 = 36%	2 of 3 = 67%
Return points won	30 of 67 = 45%	22 of 61 = 36%
Total points won	69	59

== See also ==
- 2017 Australian Open Series

== Notes ==
Preceded by 2016 US Open – Women's singles	Grand Slam women's singles	Succeeded by 2017 French Open – Women's singles
