= 2017 Australian Open – Women's doubles =

Women's doubles
- 2017 Australian Open

Final
- Champions: (United States) Bethanie Mattek-Sands (Czech Republic) Lucie Šafářová
- Runners-up: (Czech Republic) Andrea Hlaváčková (China) Peng Shuai
- Score: 6–7^{(4–7)}, 6–3, 6–3

Details
- Draw: 64
- Seeds: 16

Events
Singles	men	women		boys	girls
Doubles	men	women	mixed	boys	girls
WC Singles	men	women	quad
WC Doubles	men	women	quad
Legends	men	women	mixed
- Australian Open

Martina Hingis and Sania Mirza were the defending champions, but chose not to participate together. Hingis played alongside CoCo Vandeweghe, but lost in the second round to Ashleigh Barty and Casey Dellacqua. Mirza teamed up with Barbora Strýcová, but lost in the third round to Eri Hozumi and Miyu Kato.

Bethanie Mattek-Sands and Lucie Šafářová won the title, defeating Andrea Hlaváčková and Peng Shuai in the final, 6–7^{(4–7)}, 6–3, 6–3.

== Seeds ==
1. (France) Caroline Garcia / (France) Kristina Mladenovic (semifinals)
2. (United States) Bethanie Mattek-Sands / (Czech Republic) Lucie Šafářová (champions)
3. (Russia) Ekaterina Makarova / (Russia) Elena Vesnina (quarterfinals)
4. (India) Sania Mirza / (Czech Republic) Barbora Strýcová (third round)
5. (Switzerland) Martina Hingis / (United States) CoCo Vandeweghe (second round)
6. (Chinese Taipei) Chan Hao-ching / (Chinese Taipei) Chan Yung-jan (first round)
7. (Germany) Julia Görges / (Czech Republic) Karolína Plíšková (first round)
8. (United States) Vania King / (Kazakhstan) Yaroslava Shvedova (third round)

9. (Romania) Monica Niculescu / (United States) Abigail Spears (first round)
10. (Czech Republic) Lucie Hradecká / (Czech Republic) Kateřina Siniaková (first round)
11. (United States) Raquel Atawo / (China) Xu Yifan (quarterfinals)
12. (Czech Republic) Andrea Hlaváčková / (China) Peng Shuai (final)
13. (Slovenia) Katarina Srebotnik / (China) Zheng Saisai (third round)
14. (Netherlands) Kiki Bertens / (Sweden) Johanna Larsson (second round)
15. (United States) Serena Williams / (United States) Venus Williams (withdrew)
16. (Croatia) Darija Jurak / (Australia) Anastasia Rodionova (first round)

Click on the seed number of a player to go to their draw section.

== Draw ==
Key

- Q = Qualifier
- WC = Wild card
- LL = Lucky loser
- Alt = Alternate
- ITF = ITF entry
- PR = Protected ranking
- SR = Special ranking
- SE = Special exempt
- JE = Junior exempt
- JR = Junior Accelerator Programme entrant
- CO = College Accelerator Programme entrant
- NG = Next Gen Accelerator Program entrant
- w/o = Walkover
- r = Retired
- d = Defaulted

=== Finals ===
Quarterfinals
1	(France) Caroline Garcia (France) Kristina Mladenovic	1	6	6
WC	(Australia) Ashleigh Barty (Australia) Casey Dellacqua	6	2	1
3	(Russia) Ekaterina Makarova (Russia) Elena Vesnina	5	6^{5}
12	(Czech Republic) Andrea Hlaváčková (China) Peng Shuai	7	7^{7}
(Croatia) Mirjana Lučić-Baroni (Germany) Andrea Petkovic	3	3
(Japan) Eri Hozumi (Japan) Miyu Kato	6	6
11	(United States) Raquel Atawo (China) Xu Yifan	1	1
2	(United States) Bethanie Mattek-Sands (Czech Republic) Lucie Šafářová	6	6

Semifinals
1	(France) Caroline Garcia (France) Kristina Mladenovic	6^{4}	2
12	(Czech Republic) Andrea Hlaváčková (China) Peng Shuai	7^{7}	6
(Japan) Eri Hozumi (Japan) Miyu Kato	2	6	4
2	(United States) Bethanie Mattek-Sands (Czech Republic) Lucie Šafářová	6	4	6

Final
12	(Czech Republic) Andrea Hlaváčková (China) Peng Shuai	7^{7}	3	3
2	(United States) Bethanie Mattek-Sands (Czech Republic) Lucie Šafářová	6^{4}	6	6

=== Top half ===
==== Section 1 ====
First round
1	(France) C Garcia (France) K Mladenovic	6	6
(Switzerland) B Bencic (Croatia) A Konjuh	1	2
WC	(Australia) A Bai (Australia) L Cabrera	6^{5}	1
(Germany) A Beck (Latvia) A Sevastova	7^{7}	6
PR	(United States) L Davis (United States) M Moulton-Levy	6	6
WC	(Australia) D Aiava (Australia) A Smith	4	4
(United States) C McHale (United States) A Muhammad	5	6^{6}
13	(Slovenia) K Srebotnik (China) S Zheng	7	7^{8}
10	(Czech Republic) L Hradecká (Czech Republic) K Siniaková	6^{9}	6	1
(Germany) A-L Grönefeld (Czech Republic) K Peschke	7^{11}	4	6
(Argentina) M Irigoyen (Turkey) İ Soylu	4	6	4
PR	(Czech Republic) B Krejčíková (Kazakhstan) G Voskoboeva	6	4	6
(Ukraine) L Kichenok (Ukraine) N Kichenok	2	2
WC	(Australia) A Barty (Australia) C Dellacqua	6	6
(Serbia) J Janković (Belgium) Y Wickmayer	3	4
5	(Switzerland) M Hingis (United States) C Vandeweghe	6	6

Second round
1	(France) C Garcia (France) K Mladenovic	5	6	6
(Germany) A Beck (Latvia) A Sevastova	7	4	3
PR	(United States) L Davis (United States) M Moulton-Levy	3	3
13	(Slovenia) K Srebotnik (China) S Zheng	6	6
(Germany) A-L Grönefeld (Czech Republic) K Peschke	6	7^{7}
PR	(Czech Republic) B Krejčíková (Kazakhstan) G Voskoboeva	3	6^{5}
WC	(Australia) A Barty (Australia) C Dellacqua	6	7
5	(Switzerland) M Hingis (United States) C Vandeweghe	2	5

Third round
1	(France) C Garcia (France) K Mladenovic	6	6
13	(Slovenia) K Srebotnik (China) S Zheng	1	4
(Germany) A-L Grönefeld (Czech Republic) K Peschke	4	4
WC	(Australia) A Barty (Australia) C Dellacqua	6	6

Quarterfinals
1	(France) C Garcia (France) K Mladenovic	1	6	6
WC	(Australia) A Barty (Australia) C Dellacqua	6	2	1

==== Section 2 ====
First round
3	(Russia) E Makarova (Russia) E Vesnina	6	5	6
(Japan) S Aoyama (Japan) M Ninomiya	4	7	2
PR	(United States) L Huber (United States) M Sanchez	7^{7}	6
(United States) M Brengle (Australia) Ar Rodionova	6^{4}	2
(Switzerland) V Golubic (Czech Republic) Kr Plíšková	6	7
(Ukraine) K Bondarenko (Latvia) J Ostapenko	3	5
(United States) S Rogers (United States) T Townsend	2	7	4
14	(Netherlands) K Bertens (Sweden) J Larsson	6	5	6
12	(Czech Republic) A Hlaváčková (China) S Peng	6	7^{7}
(Japan) M Doi (Japan) K Nara	1	6^{1}
PR	(Italy) K Knapp (Luxembourg) M Minella	7	2	7^{7}
(United Kingdom) N Broady (United Kingdom) H Watson	5	6	6^{5}
(Canada) G Dabrowski (Netherlands) M Krajicek	6	6
(Georgia (country)) O Kalashnikova (Serbia) A Krunić	4	0
(Slovenia) A Klepač (Spain) MJ Martínez Sánchez	7	4	7^{7}
7	(Germany) J Görges (Czech Republic) Ka Plíšková	5	6	6^{5}

Second round
3	(Russia) E Makarova (Russia) E Vesnina	6	6
PR	(United States) L Huber (United States) M Sanchez	3	1
(Switzerland) V Golubic (Czech Republic) Kr Plíšková	6	6
14	(Netherlands) K Bertens (Sweden) J Larsson	1	4
12	(Czech Republic) A Hlaváčková (China) S Peng	6	6
PR	(Italy) K Knapp (Luxembourg) M Minella	3	2
(Canada) G Dabrowski (Netherlands) M Krajicek	6^{9}	4
(Slovenia) A Klepač (Spain) MJ Martínez Sánchez	7^{11}	6

Third round
3	(Russia) E Makarova (Russia) E Vesnina	7^{7}	2	6
(Switzerland) V Golubic (Czech Republic) Kr Plíšková	6^{5}	6	2
12	(Czech Republic) A Hlaváčková (China) S Peng	6	6
(Slovenia) A Klepač (Spain) MJ Martínez Sánchez	2	0

Quarterfinals
3	(Russia) E Makarova (Russia) E Vesnina	5	6^{5}
12	(Czech Republic) A Hlaváčková (China) S Peng	7	7^{7}

=== Bottom half ===
==== Section 3 ====
First round
8	(United States) V King (Kazakhstan) Y Shvedova	7^{7}	6
(China) Q Wang (Thailand) V Wongteanchai	6^{5}	4
(Montenegro) D Kovinić (Germany) L Siegemund	6	7
(Netherlands) D Schuurs (Czech Republic) R Voráčová	4	5
(Spain) L Arruabarrena (Romania) I-C Begu	3	4
(United States) L Chirico (Belgium) E Mertens	6	6
(Croatia) M Lučić-Baroni (Germany) A Petkovic	6	6
9	(Romania) M Niculescu (United States) A Spears	1	4
16	(Croatia) D Jurak (Australia) An Rodionova	4	6	5
(France) A Cornet (Poland) M Linette	6	3	7
(Japan) E Hozumi (Japan) M Kato	7^{7}	7^{7}
WC	(Australia) E Perez (Australia) O Tjandramulia	6^{3}	6^{3}
WC	(Australia) K Birrell (Australia) P Hon	7^{8}	4	4
(Australia) S Stosur (China) S Zhang	6^{6}	6	6
(United Kingdom) J Rae (United Kingdom) A Smith	3	1
4	(India) S Mirza (Czech Republic) B Strýcová	6	6

Second round
8	(United States) V King (Kazakhstan) Y Shvedova	6	6
(Montenegro) D Kovinić (Germany) L Siegemund	1	4
(United States) L Chirico (Belgium) E Mertens	0	6	1
(Croatia) M Lučić-Baroni (Germany) A Petkovic	6	3	6
(France) A Cornet (Poland) M Linette	6	3	3
(Japan) E Hozumi (Japan) M Kato	3	6	6
(Australia) S Stosur (China) S Zhang	1	4
4	(India) S Mirza (Czech Republic) B Strýcová	6	6

Third round
8	(United States) V King (Kazakhstan) Y Shvedova	6	2	3
(Croatia) M Lučić-Baroni (Germany) A Petkovic	4	6	6
(Japan) E Hozumi (Japan) M Kato	6	2	6
4	(India) S Mirza (Czech Republic) B Strýcová	3	6	2

Quarterfinals
(Croatia) M Lučić-Baroni (Germany) A Petkovic	3	3
(Japan) E Hozumi (Japan) M Kato	6	6

==== Section 4 ====
First round
6	(Chinese Taipei) H-c Chan (Chinese Taipei) Y-j Chan	5	2
(China) C Liang (China) Z Yang	7	6
(Japan) N Hibino (Poland) A Rosolska	6	6
(Kazakhstan) Y Putintseva (United States) A Riske	1	2
(Japan) N Osaka (Puerto Rico) M Puig	2	4
(Romania) R Olaru (Ukraine) O Savchuk	6	6
WC	(Australia) J Moore (Australia) S Sanders	4	6	2
11	(United States) R Atawo (China) Y Xu	6	3	6
Alt	(Romania) S Cîrstea (Germany) C Witthöft	4	2
(Hungary) T Babos (Russia) A Pavlyuchenkova	6	6
(Germany) T Maria (France) P Parmentier	6	6
WC	(Chinese Taipei) C-w Chan (Japan) J Namigata	3	1
(Italy) S Errani (Belgium) K Flipkens	6	6
(Australia) D Gavrilova (Russia) D Kasatkina	2	4
(Chinese Taipei) C-j Chuang (United States) N Gibbs	1	5
2	(United States) B Mattek-Sands (Czech Republic) L Šafářová	6	7

Second round
(China) C Liang (China) Z Yang	6	6
(Japan) N Hibino (Poland) A Rosolska	2	2
(Romania) R Olaru (Ukraine) O Savchuk	6^{5}	7^{7}	4
11	(United States) R Atawo (China) Y Xu	7^{7}	6^{4}	6
(Hungary) T Babos (Russia) A Pavlyuchenkova	6	6
(Germany) T Maria (France) P Parmentier	4	2
(Italy) S Errani (Belgium) K Flipkens
2	(United States) B Mattek-Sands (Czech Republic) L Šafářová	w/o

Third round
(China) C Liang (China) Z Yang	2	0
11	(United States) R Atawo (China) Y Xu	6	6
(Hungary) T Babos (Russia) A Pavlyuchenkova	3	4
2	(United States) B Mattek-Sands (Czech Republic) L Šafářová	6	6

Quarterfinals
11	(United States) R Atawo (China) Y Xu	1	1
2	(United States) B Mattek-Sands (Czech Republic) L Šafářová	6	6
