= 2017 Australian Open – Women's legends doubles =

Women's legends doubles
- 2017 Australian Open
- 2016 Champions: (United States) Lindsay Davenport (United States) Martina Navratilova

Events
Singles	men	women		boys	girls
Doubles	men	women	mixed	boys	girls
WC Singles	men	women	quad
WC Doubles	men	women	quad
Legends	men	women	mixed
← 2016 ·	Australian Open	· 2018 →

Lindsay Davenport and Martina Navratilova were the defending champions. The tournament is played using Fast4 format.

The tournament was not completed as one of the match was not played because the teams chose not to play.

== Draw ==
=== Key ===
- Q = Qualifier
- WC = Wild card
- LL = Lucky loser
- Alt = Alternate
- ITF = ITF entry
- PR = Protected ranking
- SR = Special ranking
- SE = Special exempt
- JE = Junior exempt
- JR = Junior Accelerator Programme entrant
- CO = College Accelerator Programme entrant
- NG = Next Gen Accelerator Program entrant
- w/o = Walkover
- r = Retired
- d = Defaulted

=== Group A ===
	(Australia) Bradtke (Australia) Stubbs	(United States) Davenport (United States) Navratilova	(United States) Fernández (Austria) Schett	(Croatia) Majoli (Australia) Molik	RR W–L	Set W–L	Game W–L	Standings
(Australia) Nicole Bradtke (Australia) Rennae Stubbs		4–3^{(5–3)}, 2–4, 0–4	4–3^{(5–2)}, 4–1	3–4^{(3–5)}, 3–4^{(3–5)}	1–2	3–4	20–23	2
(United States) Lindsay Davenport (United States) Martina Navratilova	3–4^{(3–5)}, 4–2, 4–0		not played	4–0, 4–2	2–0	4–1	19–8	1
(United States) Mary Joe Fernández (Austria) Barbara Schett	3–4^{(2–5)}, 1–4	not played		4–1, 4–2	1–1	2–2	12–11	3
(Croatia) Iva Majoli (Australia) Alicia Molik	4–3^{(5–3)}, 4–3^{(5–3)}	0–4, 2–4	1–4, 2–4		1–2	2–4	13–22	4

Standings are determined by: 1. number of wins; 2. number of matches; 3. in two-players-ties, head-to-head records; 4. in three-players-ties, percentage of sets won, or of games won; 5. steering-committee decision.
