= 2020 US Open – Day-by-day summaries =

Day-by-day summaries of the 2020 edition of the US Open tennis tournament

The 2020 US Open described in detail, in the form of day-by-day summaries.

== Day 1 (August 31) ==
- Seeds out:
  - Men's Singles: (Argentina) Diego Schwartzman [9], (United States) John Isner [16], (Serbia) Dušan Lajović [18]
  - Women's Singles: (Sweden) Rebecca Peterson [32]
- Schedule of Play

Matches on main courts
Matches on Arthur Ashe Stadium
Event	Winner	Loser	Score
Women's Singles 1st Round	(Czech Republic) Karolína Plíšková [1]	(Ukraine) Anhelina Kalinina	6–4, 6–0
Men's Singles 1st Round	(Germany) Alexander Zverev [5]	(South Africa) Kevin Anderson	7–6^{(7–2)}, 5–7, 6–3, 7–5
2020 US Open Opening Night Ceremony
Men's Singles 1st Round	(Serbia) Novak Djokovic [1]	(Bosnia and Herzegovina) Damir Džumhur	6–1, 6–4, 6–1
Women's Singles 1st Round	(Japan) Naomi Osaka [4]	(Japan) Misaki Doi	6–2, 5–7, 6–2
Matches on Louis Armstrong Stadium
Event	Winner	Loser	Score
Women's Singles 1st Round	(Germany) Angelique Kerber [17]	(Australia) Ajla Tomljanović	6–4, 6–4
Men's Singles 1st Round	(Canada) Denis Shapovalov [12]	(United States) Sebastian Korda [WC]	6–4, 4–6, 6–3, 6–2
Women's Singles 1st Round	(Latvia) Anastasija Sevastova [31]	(United States) Coco Gauff	6–3, 5–7, 6–4
Men's Singles 1st Round	(United States) Steve Johnson	(United States) John Isner [16]	6–7^{(5–7)}, 6–3, 6–7^{(5–7)}, 6–3, 7–6^{(7–3)}
Women's Singles 1st Round	(United States) Alison Riske [13]	(Germany) Tatjana Maria	6–3, 6–2
Colored background indicates a night match
Matches start at 11am, night session starts at 7pm Eastern Daylight Time (EDT)

== Day 2 (September 1) ==
- Seeds out:
  - Men's Singles: (Georgia (country)) Nikoloz Basilashvili [22], (Argentina) Guido Pella [29]
  - Women's Singles: (China) Zhang Shuai [25], (Russia) Veronika Kudermetova [29]
- Schedule of Play

Matches on main courts
Matches on Arthur Ashe Stadium
Event	Winner	Loser	Score
Men's Singles 1st Round	(United Kingdom) Andy Murray	(Japan) Yoshihito Nishioka	4–6, 4–6, 7–6^{(7–5)}, 7–6^{(7–4)}, 6–4
Women's Singles 1st Round	(United States) Serena Williams [3]	(United States) Kristie Ahn	7–5, 6–3
Women's Singles 1st Round	(Czech Republic) Karolína Muchová [20]	(United States) Venus Williams	6–3, 7–5
Men's Singles 1st Round	(Russia) Daniil Medvedev [3]	(Argentina) Federico Delbonis	6–1, 6–2, 6–4
Matches on Louis Armstrong Stadium
Event	Winner	Loser	Score
Women's Singles 1st Round	(Spain) Garbiñe Muguruza [10]	(Japan) Nao Hibino	6–4, 6–4
Men's Singles 1st Round	(Austria) Dominic Thiem [2]	(Spain) Jaume Munar	7–6^{(8–6)}, 6–3, retired
Women's Singles 1st Round	(United States) Sofia Kenin [2]	(Belgium) Yanina Wickmayer	6–2, 6–2
Women's Singles 1st Round	(United States) Madison Keys [7]	(Hungary) Tímea Babos	6–1, 6–1
Men's Singles 1st Round	(Bulgaria) Grigor Dimitrov [14]	(United States) Tommy Paul	6-4, 6–3, 6–1
Men's Singles 1st Round	(Italy) Matteo Berrettini [6]	(Japan) Go Soeda	7–6^{(7–5)}, 6–1, 6–4
Colored background indicates a night match
Matches start at 11am, night session starts at 7pm Eastern Daylight Time (EDT)

== Day 3 (September 2) ==
- Seeds out:
  - Men's Singles: (Chile) Cristian Garín [13], (Poland) Hubert Hurkacz [24]
  - Women's Singles: (Czech Republic) Karolína Plíšková [1], (Kazakhstan) Elena Rybakina [11], (Czech Republic) Markéta Vondroušová [12], (United States) Alison Riske [13], (Ukraine) Dayana Yastremska [19], (France) Kristina Mladenovic [30], (Latvia) Anastasija Sevastova [31]
  - Men's Doubles: (Poland) Łukasz Kubot / (Brazil) Marcelo Melo [2], (Spain) Marcel Granollers / (Argentina) Horacio Zeballos [5], (South Africa) Raven Klaasen / (Austria) Oliver Marach [7]
  - Women's Doubles: (United States) Bethanie Mattek-Sands / (China) Zhang Shuai [5]
- Schedule of Play

Matches on main courts
Matches on Arthur Ashe Stadium
Event	Winner	Loser	Score
Women's Singles 2nd Round	(Czech Republic) Petra Kvitová [6]	(Ukraine) Kateryna Kozlova	7–6^{(7–3)}, 6–2
Men's Singles 2nd Round	(Serbia) Novak Djokovic [1]	(United Kingdom) Kyle Edmund	6–7^{(5–7)}, 6–4, 6–3, 6–2
Women's Singles 2nd Round	(Japan) Naomi Osaka [4]	(Italy) Camila Giorgi	6–1, 6–2
Men's Singles 2nd Round	(Greece) Stefanos Tsitsipas [4]	(United States) Maxime Cressy [WC]	7–6^{(7–2)}, 6–3, 6–4
Matches on Louis Armstrong Stadium
Event	Winner	Loser	Score
Women's Singles 2nd Round	(Germany) Angelique Kerber [17]	(Germany) Anna-Lena Friedsam	6–3, 7–6^{(8–6)}
Men's Singles 2nd Round	(Germany) Alexander Zverev [5]	(United States) Brandon Nakashima [WC]	7–5, 6–7^{(8–10)}, 6–3, 6–1
Women's Singles 2nd Round	(France) Caroline Garcia	(Czech Republic) Karolína Plíšková [1]	6–1, 7–6^{(7–2)}
Men's Singles 2nd Round	(Canada) Denis Shapovalov [12]	(South Korea) Kwon Soon-woo	6–7^{(5–7)}, 6–4, 6–4, 6–2
Colored background indicates a night match
Matches start at 11am, night session starts at 7pm Eastern Daylight Time (EDT)

== Day 4 (September 3) ==
- Seeds out:
  - Men's Singles: (Bulgaria) Grigor Dimitrov [14], (Canada) Milos Raonic [25]
  - Women's Singles: (Belarus) Aryna Sabalenka [5], (United Kingdom) Johanna Konta [9], (Spain) Garbiñe Muguruza [10]
  - Men's Doubles: (Croatia) Ivan Dodig / (Slovakia) Filip Polášek [4]
- Schedule of Play

Matches on main courts
Matches on Arthur Ashe Stadium
Event	Winner	Loser	Score
Women's Singles 2nd Round	(United States) Sofia Kenin [2]	(Canada) Leylah Annie Fernandez	6–4, 6–3
Men's Singles 2nd Round	(Austria) Dominic Thiem [2]	(India) Sumit Nagal	6–3, 6–3, 6–2
Women's Singles 2nd Round	(United States) Serena Williams [3]	(Russia) Margarita Gasparyan	6–2, 6–4
Men's Singles 2nd Round	(Canada) Félix Auger-Aliassime [15]	(United Kingdom) Andy Murray	6–2, 6–3, 6–4
Matches on Louis Armstrong Stadium
Event	Winner	Loser	Score
Women's Singles 2nd Round	(United States) Amanda Anisimova [22]	(United States) Katrina Scott [WC]	4–6, 6–4, 6–1
Men's Singles 2nd Round	(Canada) Vasek Pospisil	(Canada) Milos Raonic [25]	6–7^{(1–7)}, 6–3, 7–6^{(7–4)}, 6–3
Women's Singles 2nd Round	(United States) Sloane Stephens [26]	(Belarus) Olga Govortsova	6–2, 6–2
Men's Singles 2nd Round	(Russia) Daniil Medvedev [3]	(Australia) Christopher O'Connell	6–3, 6–2, 6–4
Women's Singles 2nd Round	(Belarus) Victoria Azarenka	(Belarus) Aryna Sabalenka [5]	6–1, 6–3
Colored background indicates a night match
Matches start at 11am, night session starts at 7pm Eastern Daylight Time (EDT)

== Day 5 (September 4) ==
- Seeds out:
  - Men's Singles: (Greece) Stefanos Tsitsipas [4], (United States) Taylor Fritz [19], (United Kingdom) Dan Evans [23], (Serbia) Filip Krajinović [26], (Germany) Jan-Lennard Struff [28], (France) Adrian Mannarino [32]
  - Women's Singles: (Russia) Ekaterina Alexandrova [21], (Poland) Magda Linette [24]
  - Women's Doubles: (Belarus) Victoria Azarenka / (United States) Sofia Kenin [7], (Germany) Anna-Lena Friedsam / (Czech Republic) Kateřina Siniaková [8]
- Schedule of Play

Matches on main courts
Matches on Arthur Ashe Stadium
Event	Winner	Loser	Score
Women's Singles 3rd Round	(Japan) Naomi Osaka [4]	(Ukraine) Marta Kostyuk	6–3, 6–7^{(4–7)}, 6–2
Men's Singles 3rd Round	(Canada) Denis Shapovalov [12]	(United States) Taylor Fritz [19]	3–6, 6–3, 4–6, 7–6^{(7–5)}, 6–2
Men's Singles 3rd Round	(Serbia) Novak Djokovic [1]	(Germany) Jan-Lennard Struff [28]	6–3, 6–3, 6–1
Women's Singles 3rd Round	(Czech Republic) Petra Kvitová [6]	(United States) Jessica Pegula	6–4, 6–3
Matches on Louis Armstrong Stadium
Event	Winner	Loser	Score
Women's Singles 3rd Round	(Croatia) Petra Martić [8]	(Russia) Varvara Gracheva	6–3, 6–3
Women's Singles 3rd Round	(Germany) Angelique Kerber [17]	(United States) Ann Li	6–3, 6–4
Men's Singles 3rd Round	(Germany) Alexander Zverev [5]	(France) Adrian Mannarino [32]	6–7^{(4–7)}, 6–4, 6–2, 6–2
Men's Singles 3rd Round	(Croatia) Borna Ćorić [27]	(Greece) Stefanos Tsitsipas [4]	6–7^{(2–7)}, 6–4, 4–6, 7–5, 7–6^{(7–4)}
Matches start at 11am, night session starts at 7pm Eastern Daylight Time (EDT)

== Day 6 (September 5) ==
- Seeds out:
  - Men's Singles: (Spain) Roberto Bautista Agut [8], (Russia) Karen Khachanov [11], (Norway) Casper Ruud [30], (Croatia) Marin Čilić [31]
  - Women's Singles: (United States) Madison Keys [7], (Croatia) Donna Vekić [18], (United States) Amanda Anisimova [22], (United States) Sloane Stephens [26], (Tunisia) Ons Jabeur [27]
  - Men's Doubles: (Colombia) Juan Sebastián Cabal / (Colombia) Robert Farah [1], (Germany) Kevin Krawietz / (Germany) Andreas Mies [6]
  - Women's Doubles: (Hungary) Tímea Babos / (France) Kristina Mladenovic [1], (Japan) Shuko Aoyama / (Japan) Ena Shibahara [6]
- Schedule of Play

Matches on main courts
Matches on Arthur Ashe Stadium
Event	Winner	Loser	Score
Men's Singles 3rd Round	(Russia) Daniil Medvedev [3]	(United States) J. J. Wolf [WC]	6–3, 6–3, 6–2
Women's Singles 3rd Round	(United States) Serena Williams [3]	(United States) Sloane Stephens [26]	2–6, 6–2, 6–2
Women's Singles 3rd Round	(France) Alizé Cornet	(United States) Madison Keys [7]	7–6^{(7–4)}, 3–2, retired
Men's Singles 3rd Round	(Austria) Dominic Thiem [2]	(Croatia) Marin Čilić [31]	6–2, 6–2, 3–6, 6–3
Matches on Louis Armstrong Stadium
Event	Winner	Loser	Score
Women's Singles 3rd Round	(Greece) Maria Sakkari [15]	(United States) Amanda Anisimova [22]	6–3, 6–1
Men's Singles 3rd Round	(Canada) Vasek Pospisil	(Spain) Roberto Bautista Agut [8]	7–5, 2–6, 4–6, 6–3, 6–2
Men's Singles 3rd Round	(United States) Frances Tiafoe	(Hungary) Márton Fucsovics	6–2, 6–3, 6–2
Women's Singles 3rd Round	(Belarus) Victoria Azarenka	(Poland) Iga Świątek	6–4, 6–2
Women's Singles 3rd Round	(United States) Sofia Kenin [2]	(Tunisia) Ons Jabeur [27]	7–6^{(7–4)}, 6–3
Colored background indicates a night match
Matches start at 11am, night session starts at 7pm Eastern Daylight Time (EDT)

== Day 7 (September 6) ==
- Seeds out:
  - Men's Singles: (Serbia) Novak Djokovic [1], (Belgium) David Goffin [7]
  - Women's Singles: (Czech Republic) Petra Kvitová [6], (Croatia) Petra Martić [8], (Estonia) Anett Kontaveit [14], (Germany) Angelique Kerber [17]
  - Women's Doubles: (Belgium) Elise Mertens / (Belarus) Aryna Sabalenka [2], (Czech Republic) Květa Peschke / (Netherlands) Demi Schuurs [4]
- Schedule of Play

Matches on main courts
Matches on Arthur Ashe Stadium
Event	Winner	Loser	Score
Women's Singles 4th Round	(Kazakhstan) Yulia Putintseva [23]	(Croatia) Petra Martić [8]	6–3, 2–6, 6–4
Men's Singles 4th Round	(Spain) Pablo Carreño Busta [20]	(Serbia) Novak Djokovic [1]	6–5, defaulted
Men's Singles 4th Round	(Canada) Denis Shapovalov [12]	(Belgium) David Goffin [7]	6–7^{(0–7)}, 6–3, 6–4, 6–3
Women's Singles 4th Round	(Japan) Naomi Osaka [4]	(Estonia) Anett Kontaveit [14]	6–3, 6–4
Matches on Louis Armstrong Stadium
Event	Winner	Loser	Score
Women's Singles 4th Round	(United States) Jennifer Brady [28]	(Germany) Angelique Kerber [17]	6–1, 6–4
Men's Singles 4th Round	(Germany) Alexander Zverev [5]	(Spain) Alejandro Davidovich Fokina	6–2, 6–2, 6–1
Women's Singles 4th Round	(United States) Shelby Rogers	(Czech Republic) Petra Kvitová [6]	7–6^{(7–5)}, 3–6, 7–6^{(8–6)}
Men's Singles 4th Round	(Croatia) Borna Ćorić [27]	(Australia) Jordan Thompson	7–5, 6–1, 6–3
Colored background indicates a night match
Matches start at 11am, night session starts at 7pm Eastern Daylight Time (EDT)

== Day 8 (September 7) ==
- Seeds out:
  - Men's Singles: (Italy) Matteo Berrettini [6], (Canada) Félix Auger-Aliassime [15]
  - Women's Singles: (United States) Sofia Kenin [2], (Greece) Maria Sakkari [15], (Czech Republic) Karolína Muchová [20]
- Schedule of Play

Matches on main courts
Matches on Arthur Ashe Stadium
Event	Winner	Loser	Score
Women's Singles 4th Round	(United States) Serena Williams [3]	(Greece) Maria Sakkari [15]	6–3, 6–7^{(6–8)}, 6–3
Men's Singles 4th Round	(Austria) Dominic Thiem [2]	(Canada) Félix Auger-Aliassime [15]	7–6^{(7–4)}, 6–1, 6–1
Men's Singles 4th Round	(Russia) Daniil Medvedev [3]	(United States) Frances Tiafoe	6–4, 6–1, 6–0
Women's Singles 4th Round	(Belgium) Elise Mertens [16]	(United States) Sofia Kenin [2]	6–3, 6–3
Matches on Louis Armstrong Stadium
Event	Winner	Loser	Score
Men's Singles 4th Round	(Australia) Alex de Minaur [21]	(Canada) Vasek Pospisil	7–6^{(8–6)}, 6–3, 6–2
Women's Singles 4th Round	(Bulgaria) Tsvetana Pironkova [PR]	(France) Alizé Cornet	6–4, 6–7^{(5–7)}, 6–3
Men's Singles 4th Round	(Russia) Andrey Rublev [10]	(Italy) Matteo Berrettini [6]	4–6, 6–3, 6–3, 6–3
Women's Singles 4th Round	(Belarus) Victoria Azarenka	(Czech Republic) Karolína Muchová [20]	5–7, 6–1, 6–4
Colored background indicates a night match
Matches start at 11am, night session starts at 7pm Eastern Daylight Time (EDT)

== Day 9 (September 8) ==
- Seeds out:
  - Men's Singles: (Canada) Denis Shapovalov [12], (Croatia) Borna Ćorić [27]
  - Women's Singles: (Kazakhstan) Yulia Putintseva [23]
  - Men's Doubles: (United States) Rajeev Ram / (United Kingdom) Joe Salisbury [3]
- Schedule of Play

Matches on main courts
Matches on Arthur Ashe Stadium
Event	Winner	Loser	Score
Women's Singles Quarterfinals	(United States) Jennifer Brady [28]	(Kazakhstan) Yulia Putintseva [23]	6–3, 6–2
Men's Singles Quarterfinals	(Germany) Alexander Zverev [5]	(Croatia) Borna Ćorić [27]	1–6, 7–6^{(7–5)}, 7–6^{(7–1)}, 6–3
Women's Singles Quarterfinals	(Japan) Naomi Osaka [4]	(United States) Shelby Rogers	6–3, 6–4
Men's Singles Quarterfinals	(Spain) Pablo Carreño Busta [20]	(Canada) Denis Shapovalov [12]	3−6, 7−6^{(7–5)}, 7−6^{(7–4)}, 0–6, 6–3
Matches on Louis Armstrong Stadium
Event	Winner	Loser	Score
Women's Doubles Semifinals	(Germany) Laura Siegemund [PR] (Russia) Vera Zvonareva [PR]	(Russia) Anna Blinkova (Russia) Veronika Kudermetova	5–7, 6–3, 7–5
Men's Doubles Semifinals	(Netherlands) Wesley Koolhof [8] (Croatia) Nikola Mektić [8]	(United States) Rajeev Ram [3] (United Kingdom) Joe Salisbury [3]	7−6^{(7−3)}, 6−4
Men's Doubles Semifinals	(Croatia) Mate Pavić (Brazil) Bruno Soares	(Netherlands) Jean-Julien Rojer (Romania) Horia Tecău	6−4, 7−5
Colored background indicates a night match
Matches start at 12pm, night session starts at 7pm Eastern Daylight Time (EDT)

== Day 10 (September 9) ==
- Seeds out:
  - Men's Singles: (Russia) Andrey Rublev [10], (Australia) Alex de Minaur [21]
  - Women's Singles: (Belgium) Elise Mertens [16]
- Schedule of Play

Matches on main courts
Matches on Arthur Ashe Stadium
Event	Winner	Loser	Score
Women's Singles Quarterfinals	(United States) Serena Williams [3]	(Bulgaria) Tsvetana Pironkova [PR]	4–6, 6–3, 6–2
Men's Singles Quarterfinals	(Russia) Daniil Medvedev [3]	(Russia) Andrey Rublev [10]	7–6^{(8–6)}, 6–3, 7–6^{(7–5)}
Women's Singles Quarterfinals	(Belarus) Victoria Azarenka	(Belgium) Elise Mertens [16]	6–1, 6–0
Men's Singles Quarterfinals	(Austria) Dominic Thiem [2]	(Australia) Alex de Minaur [21]	6–1, 6–2, 6–4
Matches on Louis Armstrong Stadium
Event	Winner	Loser	Score
Women's Doubles Semifinals	(United States) Nicole Melichar [3] (China) Xu Yifan [3]	(United States) Asia Muhammad (United States) Taylor Townsend	6−4, 3−6, 7−6^{(9−7)}
Colored background indicates a night match
Matches start at 12pm, night session starts at 7pm Eastern Daylight Time (EDT)

== Day 11 (September 10) ==
- Seeds out:
  - Women's Singles: (United States) Serena Williams [3], (United States) Jennifer Brady [28]
  - Men's Doubles: (Netherlands) Wesley Koolhof / (Croatia) Nikola Mektić [8]
- Schedule of Play

Matches on main courts
Matches on Arthur Ashe Stadium
Event	Winner	Loser	Score
Men's Doubles Final	(Croatia) Mate Pavić (Brazil) Bruno Soares	(Netherlands) Wesley Koolhof [8] (Croatia) Nikola Mektić [8]	7–5, 6–3
Women's Singles Semifinals	(Japan) Naomi Osaka [4]	(United States) Jennifer Brady [28]	7–6^{(7–1)}, 3–6, 6–3
Women's Singles Semifinals	(Belarus) Victoria Azarenka	(United States) Serena Williams [3]	1–6, 6–3, 6–3
Matches on Louis Armstrong Stadium
Event	Winner	Loser	Score
Wheelchair Men's Singles Quarterfinals	(Japan) Shingo Kunieda [1]	(France) Nicolas Peifer	6–3, 6–2
Wheelchair Women's Singles Quarterfinals	(Japan) Yui Kamiji [2]	(Japan) Momoko Ohtani	6–2, 7–6^{(7–5)}
Wheelchair Women's Singles Quarterfinals	(Netherlands) Diede de Groot [1]	(United Kingdom) Jordanne Whiley	6–3, 6–4
Wheelchair Men's Singles Round Robin	(Australia) Dylan Alcott [1]	(Netherlands) Sam Schröder	6–2, 6–4
Colored background indicates a night match
Matches start at 12pm, night session starts at 7pm Eastern Daylight Time (EDT)

== Day 12 (September 11) ==
- Seeds out:
  - Men's Singles: (Russia) Daniil Medvedev [3], (Spain) Pablo Carreño Busta [20]
  - Women's Doubles: (United States) Nicole Melichar / (China) Xu Yifan [3]
- Schedule of Play

Matches on main courts
Matches on Arthur Ashe Stadium
Event	Winner	Loser	Score
Women's Doubles Final	(Germany) Laura Siegemund [PR] (Russia) Vera Zvonareva [PR]	(United States) Nicole Melichar [3] (China) Xu Yifan [3]	6–4, 6–4
Men's Singles Semifinals	(Germany) Alexander Zverev [5]	(Spain) Pablo Carreño Busta [20]	3–6, 2–6, 6–3, 6–4, 6–3
Men's Singles Semifinals	(Austria) Dominic Thiem [2]	(Russia) Daniil Medvedev [3]	6–2, 7–6^{(9–7)}, 7–6^{(7–5)}
Matches on Louis Armstrong Stadium
Event	Winner	Loser	Score
Wheelchair Men's Singles Semifinals	(United Kingdom) Alfie Hewett	(Argentina) Gustavo Fernández [2]	6–4, 1–6, 6–3
Wheelchair Women's Singles Semifinals	(Japan) Yui Kamiji [2]	(Colombia) Angélica Bernal	6–2, 6–1
Wheelchair Men's Doubles Semifinals	(United Kingdom) Alfie Hewett [1] (United Kingdom) Gordon Reid [1]	(Argentina) Gustavo Fernández (Japan) Shingo Kunieda	6–3, 6–3
Wheelchair Women's Doubles Semifinals	(Japan) Yui Kamiji [2] (United Kingdom) Jordanne Whiley [2]	(Colombia) Angélica Bernal (United States) Dana Mathewson	6–2, 6–1
Matches start at 12pm Eastern Daylight Time (EDT)

== Day 13 (September 12) ==
- Schedule of Play

Matches on main courts
Matches on Arthur Ashe Stadium
Event	Winner	Loser	Score
Wheelchair Men's Doubles Final	(United Kingdom) Alfie Hewett [1] (United Kingdom) Gordon Reid [1]	(France) Stéphane Houdet [2] (France) Nicolas Peifer [2]	6–4, 6–1
Women's Singles Final	(Japan) Naomi Osaka [4]	(Belarus) Victoria Azarenka	1–6, 6–3, 6–3
Matches on Louis Armstrong Stadium
Event	Winner	Loser	Score
Wheelchair Quad Singles Round Robin	(Netherlands) Sam Schröder [WC]	(United Kingdom) Andy Lapthorne [2]	6–2, 6–1
Wheelchair Women's Singles Final	(Netherlands) Diede de Groot [1]	(Japan) Yui Kamiji [2]	6–3, 6–3
Wheelchair Quad Doubles Final	(Australia) Dylan Alcott (United Kingdom) Andy Lapthorne	(Netherlands) Sam Schröder (United States) David Wagner	3–6, 6–4, [10–8]
Matches start at 12pm Eastern Daylight Time (EDT)

== Day 14 (September 13) ==
- Seeds out:
  - Men's Singles: (Germany) Alexander Zverev [5]
- Schedule of Play

Matches on main courts
Matches on Arthur Ashe Stadium
Event	Winner	Loser	Score
Wheelchair Women's Doubles Final	(Japan) Yui Kamiji [2] (United Kingdom) Jordanne Whiley [2]	(Netherlands) Marjolein Buis [1] (Netherlands) Diede de Groot [1]	6–3, 6–3
Men's Singles Final	(Austria) Dominic Thiem [2]	(Germany) Alexander Zverev [5]	2–6, 4–6, 6–4, 6–3, 7–6^{(8–6)}
Matches on Louis Armstrong Stadium
Event	Winner	Loser	Score
Wheelchair Men's Singles Final	(Japan) Shingo Kunieda [1]	(United Kingdom) Alfie Hewett	6–3, 3–6, 7–6^{(7–3)}
Wheelchair Quad Singles Final	(Netherlands) Sam Schröder [WC]	(Australia) Dylan Alcott [1]	7–6^{(7–5)}, 0–6, 6–4
Matches start at 12pm Eastern Daylight Time (EDT)
