= 2019 US Open – Wheelchair quad doubles =

Wheelchair quad doubles
- 2019 US Open

Final
- Champions: (Australia) Dylan Alcott (United Kingdom) Andrew Lapthorne
- Runners-up: (United States) Bryan Barten (United States) David Wagner
- Score: 6–7^{(5–7)}, 6–1, [10–6]

Events
Singles	men	women		boys	girls
Doubles	men	women	mixed	boys	girls
WC Singles	men	women	quad
WC Doubles	men	women	quad
Legends	men	women	mixed
← 2018 ·	US Open	· 2020 →

Two-time defending champion Andrew Lapthorne and his partner Dylan Alcott defeated the other nine-time defending champion David Wagner and his partner Bryan Barten in the final, 6–7^{(5–7)}, 6–1, [10–6] to win the quad doubles wheelchair tennis title at the 2019 US Open. Alcott completed the Grand Slam and the career Golden Slam with the win.

== Seeds ==
1. (Australia) Dylan Alcott / (United Kingdom) Andrew Lapthorne (champions)
2. (United States) Bryan Barten / (United States) David Wagner (final)

== Draw ==
=== Key ===
- Q = Qualifier
- WC = Wild card
- LL = Lucky loser
- Alt = Alternate
- SE = Special exempt
- PR = Protected ranking
- ITF = ITF entry
- JE = Junior exempt
- w/o = Walkover
- r = Retired
- d = Defaulted
- SR = Special ranking

=== Bracket ===
Final
1	(Australia) Dylan Alcott (United Kingdom) Andrew Lapthorne	6^{5}	6	[10]
2	(United States) Bryan Barten (United States) David Wagner	7^{7}	1	[6]
