= Wheelchair tennis at the 2020 Summer Paralympics – Quad doubles =

Wheelchair tennis – Quad doubles at the XVI Paralympic Games
- Paralympic wheelchair tennis
- Venue: Ariake Tennis Park
- Date: 27 August – 1 September 2021
- Competitors: 14 from 7 nations

Medalists
1st place, gold medalist(s)		Sam Schröder; Niels Vink	Netherlands
2nd place, silver medalist(s)		Dylan Alcott; Heath Davidson	Australia
3rd place, bronze medalist(s)		Mitsuteru Moroishi; Koji Sugeno	Japan

Quad doubles
- Wheelchair tennis at the 2020 Summer Paralympics

Events
Singles	men	women	quad
Doubles	men	women	quad
- Summer Paralympics

Sam Schröder and Niels Vink of the Netherlands defeated defending gold medalists Dylan Alcott and Heath Davidson of Australia in the final, 6–4, 6–3 to win the gold medal in quad doubles wheelchair tennis at the 2020 Paralympic Games.

The event was held at the Ariake Tennis Park in Kōtō, Tokyo, Japan, from 27 August to 1 September 2021.

== Seeds ==
1. Dylan Alcott (AUS) / Heath Davidson (AUS) (silver medalists)
2. Sam Schröder (NED) / Niels Vink (NED) (gold medalists)

== Draw ==
Quarterfinals
Yosi Saadon (ISR); Shraga Weinberg (ISR)	5	2
Mitsuteru Moroishi (JPN); Koji Sugeno (JPN)	7	6
Antony Cotterill (GBR); Andy Lapthorne (GBR)	6	6
Kim Kyu-seung (KOR); Kim Myung-je (KOR)	2	0
Bryan Barten (USA); David Wagner (USA)	2	1
2	Sam Schröder (NED); Niels Vink (NED)	6	6

Semifinals
1	Dylan Alcott (AUS); Heath Davidson (AUS)	6	6
Mitsuteru Moroishi (JPN); Koji Sugeno (JPN)	2	4
Antony Cotterill (GBR); Andy Lapthorne (GBR)	0	2
2	Sam Schröder (NED); Niels Vink (NED)	6	6

Gold medal match
1	Dylan Alcott (AUS); Heath Davidson (AUS)	4	3
2	Sam Schröder (NED); Niels Vink (NED)	6	6
Bronze-medal match
Mitsuteru Moroishi (JPN); Koji Sugeno (JPN)	7	3	7
Antony Cotterill (GBR); Andy Lapthorne (GBR)	5	6	5
