= Wheelchair tennis at the 2020 Summer Paralympics – Quad singles =

Wheelchair tennis – Quad singles at the XVI Paralympic Games
- Paralympic wheelchair tennis
- Venue: Ariake Tennis Park
- Date: 28 August – 2 September 2021
- Competitors: 16 from 9 nations

Medalists
1st place, gold medalist(s)		Dylan Alcott	Australia
2nd place, silver medalist(s)		Sam Schröder	Netherlands
3rd place, bronze medalist(s)		Niels Vink	Netherlands

Quad singles
- Wheelchair tennis at the 2020 Summer Paralympics

Events
Singles	men	women	quad
Doubles	men	women	quad
← 2016 ·	Summer Paralympics	· 2024 →

The quad singles wheelchair tennis tournament at the 2020 Paralympic Games in Tokyo was held at the Ariake Tennis Park in Kōtō, Tokyo from 28 August to 4 September 2021.

The defending champion was Dylan Alcott, who was the number 1 seed for the tournament. Alcott succeeded in winning the fourth leg of a Golden Slam, having won the Australian Open, French Open and Wimbledon earlier in the year.

== Seeds ==
1. Dylan Alcott (AUS) (champion, gold medalist)
2. Sam Schröder (NED) (final, silver medalist)
3. Andy Lapthorne (GBR) (quarterfinals)
4. David Wagner (USA) (quarterfinals)

== Draw ==
Round of 16
1	Dylan Alcott (AUS)	6	6
Mitsuteru Moroishi (JPN)	0	2
Bryan Barten (USA)	6	6
Kim Kyu-seung (KOR)	4	1
3	Andy Lapthorne (GBR)	6	6
Robert Shaw (CAN)	3	3
Shraga Weinberg (ISR)	0	3
Niels Vink (NED)	6	6
Kim Myung-je (KOR)	0	0
Koji Sugeno (JPN)	6	6
Ymanitu Silva (BRA)	6	2	2
4	David Wagner (USA)	3	6	6
Antony Cotterill (GBR)	1	0
Heath Davidson (AUS)	6	6
Yosi Saadon (ISR)	1	2
2	Sam Schröder (NED)	6	6

Quarterfinals
1	Dylan Alcott (AUS)	6	6
Bryan Barten (USA)	0	1
3	Andy Lapthorne (GBR)	4	1
Niels Vink (NED)	6	6
Koji Sugeno (JPN)	6	6
4	David Wagner (USA)	4	2
Heath Davidson (AUS)	2	1
2	Sam Schröder (NED)	6	6

Semifinals
1	Dylan Alcott (AUS)	6	3	6
Niels Vink (NED)	4	6	4
Koji Sugeno (JPN)	2	3
2	Sam Schröder (NED)	6	6

Final (gold-medal match)
1	Dylan Alcott (AUS)	7^{7}	6
2	Sam Schröder (NED)	6^{2}	1
Bronze-medal match
Niels Vink (NED)	6	6
Koji Sugeno (JPN)	1	4
