= 2018 US Open – Girls' doubles =

Girls' doubles
- 2018 US Open

Final
- Champions: (United States) Cori Gauff (United States) Caty McNally
- Runners-up: (United States) Hailey Baptiste (United States) Dalayna Hewitt
- Score: 6–3, 6–2

Events
Singles	men	women		boys	girls
Doubles	men	women	mixed	boys	girls
WC Singles	men	women	quad
WC Doubles	men	women	quad
Legends	men	women	mixed
- US Open

Olga Danilović and Marta Kostyuk were the defending champions, but both players chose not to participate.

Top seeds Cori Gauff and Caty McNally won the title, defeating Hailey Baptiste and Dalayna Hewitt in an all-American final, 6–3, 6–2.

== Seeds ==
1. (United States) Cori Gauff / (United States) Caty McNally (champions)
2. (Luxembourg) Eléonora Molinaro / (China) Wang Xiyu (first round)
3. (United States) Alexa Noel / (Japan) Naho Sato (quarterfinals)
4. (Italy) Elisabetta Cocciaretto / (Denmark) Clara Tauson (second round)
5. (Chinese Taipei) Joanna Garland / (Japan) Moyuka Uchijima (semifinals)
6. (France) Clara Burel / (France) Diane Parry (second round)
7. (Colombia) Camila Osorio / (United States) Gabriella Price (quarterfinals)
8. (United States) Hurricane Tyra Black / (United States) Lea Ma (second round)

== Draw ==
Key

- Q = Qualifier
- WC = Wild card
- LL = Lucky loser
- Alt = Alternate
- ITF = ITF entry
- PR = Protected ranking
- SR = Special ranking
- SE = Special exempt
- JE = Junior exempt
- JR = Junior Accelerator Programme entrant
- CO = College Accelerator Programme entrant
- NG = Next Gen Accelerator Program entrant
- w/o = Walkover
- r = Retired
- d = Defaulted

=== Finals ===
Semifinals
1	(United States) Cori Gauff (United States) Caty McNally	6	6
5	(Chinese Taipei) Joanna Garland (Japan) Moyuka Uchijima	2	2
WC	(United States) Chloe Beck (United States) Emma Navarro	4	3
(United States) Hailey Baptiste (United States) Dalayna Hewitt	6	6

Final
1	(United States) Cori Gauff (United States) Caty McNally	6	6
(United States) Hailey Baptiste (United States) Dalayna Hewitt	3	2

=== Top half ===
First round
1	(United States) Cori Gauff (United States) Caty McNally	6	6
(Thailand) Thasaporn Naklo (Hong Kong) Cody Wong Hong-yi	1	3
(Ukraine) Viktoriia Dema (Republic of Ireland) Georgia Drummy	4	4
(Russia) Taisya Pachkaleva (Russia) Anastasia Tikhonova	6	6
WC	(United States) Robin Montgomery (United States) Katrina Scott	0	6	[10]
(Italy) Melania Delai (Georgia (country)) Ana Makatsaria	6	3	[5]
(France) Mylène Halemai (France) Yasmine Mansouri	5	7	[6]
7	(Colombia) Camila Osorio (United States) Gabriella Price	7	5	[10]
4	(Italy) Elisabetta Cocciaretto (Denmark) Clara Tauson	6	6
(Hungary) Adrienn Nagy (Guatemala) María Gabriela Rivera Corado	1	4
(Romania) Selma Ștefania Cadar (Belarus) Viktoryia Kanapatskaya	6^{4}	6	[10]
(United States) Kacie Harvey (United States) Emma Jackson	7^{7}	1	[8]
WC	(United States) Elysia Bolton (United States) Vanessa Ong	3	6^{6}
(Ukraine) Margaryta Bilokin (Burundi) Sada Nahimana	6	7^{8}
(Georgia (country)) Mariam Dalakishvili (Thailand) Mananchaya Sawangkaew	5	0
5	(Chinese Taipei) Joanna Garland (Japan) Moyuka Uchijima	7	6

Second round
1	(United States) C Gauff (United States) C McNally	6	6
(Russia) T Pachkaleva (Russia) A Tikhonova	2	4
WC	(United States) R Montgomery (United States) K Scott	6	2	[5]
7	(Colombia) C Osorio (United States) G Price	1	6	[10]
4	(Italy) E Cocciaretto (Denmark) C Tauson	4	4
(Romania) SȘ Cadar (Belarus) V Kanapatskaya	6	6
(Ukraine) M Bilokin (Burundi) S Nahimana	3	2
5	(Chinese Taipei) J Garland (Japan) M Uchijima	6	6

Quarterfinals
1	(United States) C Gauff (United States) C McNally	6	6
7	(Colombia) C Osorio (United States) G Price	3	2
(Romania) SȘ Cadar (Belarus) V Kanapatskaya	2	2
5	(Chinese Taipei) J Garland (Japan) M Uchijima	6	6

Semifinals
1	(United States) C Gauff (United States) C McNally	6	6
5	(Chinese Taipei) J Garland (Japan) M Uchijima	2	2

=== Bottom half ===
First round
6	(France) Clara Burel (France) Diane Parry	6	6
Alt	(Poland) Weronika Falkowska (Poland) Stefania Rogozińska Dzik	1	3
(Canada) Leylah Annie Fernandez (France) Manon Léonard	4	7^{7}	[8]
WC	(United States) Chloe Beck (United States) Emma Navarro	6	6^{2}	[10]
(United States) Elizabeth Mandlik (United States) Peyton Stearns	6	7^{10}
(Ukraine) Daria Lopatetska (Russia) Oksana Selekhmeteva	3	6^{8}
(Papua New Guinea) Violet Apisah (Switzerland) Lulu Sun	3	6	[6]
3	(United States) Alexa Noel (Japan) Naho Sato	6	3	[10]
8	(United States) Hurricane Tyra Black (United States) Lea Ma	3	6	[11]
(Russia) Kamilla Rakhimova (Slovakia) Lenka Stará	6	3	[9]
(Japan) Himari Sato (China) Zheng Qinwen	6	6
(Japan) Mana Kawamura (Ukraine) Daria Snigur	3	1
(Latvia) Kamilla Bartone (Malta) Francesca Curmi	0	1
(United States) Hailey Baptiste (United States) Dalayna Hewitt	6	6
(United States) Natasha Subhash (United States) Katie Volynets	6	5	[10]
2	(Luxembourg) Eléonora Molinaro (China) Wang Xiyu	2	7	[2]

Second round
6	(France) C Burel (France) D Parry	5	5
WC	(United States) C Beck (United States) E Navarro	7	7
(United States) E Mandlik (United States) P Stearns	2	4
3	(United States) A Noel (Japan) N Sato	6	6
8	(United States) HT Black (United States) L Ma	3	6	[13]
(Japan) H Sato (China) Q Zheng	6	2	[15]
(United States) H Baptiste (United States) D Hewitt	6	7^{8}
(United States) N Subhash (United States) K Volynets	4	6^{6}

Quarterfinals
WC	(United States) C Beck (United States) E Navarro	6	6
3	(United States) A Noel (Japan) N Sato	1	3
(Japan) H Sato (China) Q Zheng	3	5
(United States) H Baptiste (United States) D Hewitt	6	7

Semifinals
WC	(United States) C Beck (United States) E Navarro	4	3
(United States) H Baptiste (United States) D Hewitt	6	6
