= 2018 US Open – Wheelchair quad doubles =

Wheelchair quad doubles
- 2018 US Open

Final
- Champions: (United Kingdom) Andrew Lapthorne (United States) David Wagner
- Runners-up: (Australia) Dylan Alcott (United States) Bryan Barten
- Score: 3–6, 6–0, [10–4]

Events
Singles	men	women		boys	girls
Doubles	men	women	mixed	boys	girls
WC Singles	men	women	quad
WC Doubles	men	women	quad
Legends	men	women	mixed
← 2017 ·	US Open	· 2019 →

Defending champions Andrew Lapthorne and David Wagner defeated Dylan Alcott and Bryan Barten in the final, 3–6, 6–0, [10–4] to win the quad doubles wheelchair tennis title at the 2018 US Open.

== Seeds ==
1. (United Kingdom) Andrew Lapthorne / (United States) David Wagner (champions)
2. (Australia) Dylan Alcott / (United States) Bryan Barten (final)

== Draw ==
=== Key ===
- Q = Qualifier
- WC = Wild card
- LL = Lucky loser
- Alt = Alternate
- SE = Special exempt
- PR = Protected ranking
- ITF = ITF entry
- JE = Junior exempt
- w/o = Walkover
- r = Retired
- d = Defaulted
- SR = Special ranking

=== Bracket ===
Final
1	(United Kingdom) Andrew Lapthorne (United States) David Wagner	3	6	[10]
2	(Australia) Dylan Alcott (United States) Bryan Barten	6	0	[4]
