= 2019 US Open – Wheelchair quad singles =

Wheelchair quad singles
- 2019 US Open

Final
- Champion: (United Kingdom) Andrew Lapthorne
- Runner-up: (Australia) Dylan Alcott
- Score: 6–1, 6–0

Events
Singles	men	women		boys	girls
Doubles	men	women	mixed	boys	girls
WC Singles	men	women	quad
WC Doubles	men	women	quad
Legends	men	women	mixed
← 2018 ·	US Open	· 2020 →

Andrew Lapthorne defeated the defending champion Dylan Alcott in the final, 6–1, 6–0 to win the quad singles wheelchair tennis title at the 2019 US Open. Alcott was attempting to complete the Grand Slam.

== Seeds ==
1. (Australia) Dylan Alcott (final)
2. (United States) David Wagner (round robin)

== Draw ==
=== Key ===
- Q = Qualifier
- WC = Wild card
- LL = Lucky loser
- Alt = Alternate
- SE = Special exempt
- PR = Protected ranking
- ITF = ITF entry
- JE = Junior exempt
- w/o = Walkover
- r = Retired
- d = Defaulted
- SR = Special ranking

=== Final ===
Final
1	(Australia) Dylan Alcott	1	0
	(United Kingdom) Andrew Lapthorne	6	6

=== Round robin ===
		(Australia) Alcott	(United States) Wagner	(United Kingdom) Lapthorne	(United States) Barten	RR W–L	Set W–L	Game W–L	Standings
1	(Australia) Dylan Alcott		6–0, 7–6^{(7–3)}	0–6, 7–6^{(7–3)}, 6–3	6–2, 6–0	3–0	6–1 (86%)	38–23 (62%)	1
2	(United States) David Wagner	0–6, 6–7^{(3–7)}		1–6, 1–6	6–0, 6–1	1–2	2–4 (33%)	20–26 (43%)	3
	(United Kingdom) Andrew Lapthorne	6–0, 6–7^{(3–7)}, 3–6	6–1, 6–1		6–1, 6–3	2–1	5–2 (71%)	39–19 (67%)	2
WC	(United States) Bryan Barten	2–6, 0–6	0–6, 1–6	1–6, 3–6		0–3	0–6 (0%)	7–36 (16%)	4

Standings are determined by: 1. number of wins; 2. number of matches; 3. in two-players-ties, head-to-head records; 4. in three-players-ties, percentage of sets won, or of games won; 5. steering-committee decision.
