= Dylan Alcott =

Australian wheelchair athlete (born 1990)

Dylan Alcott AO
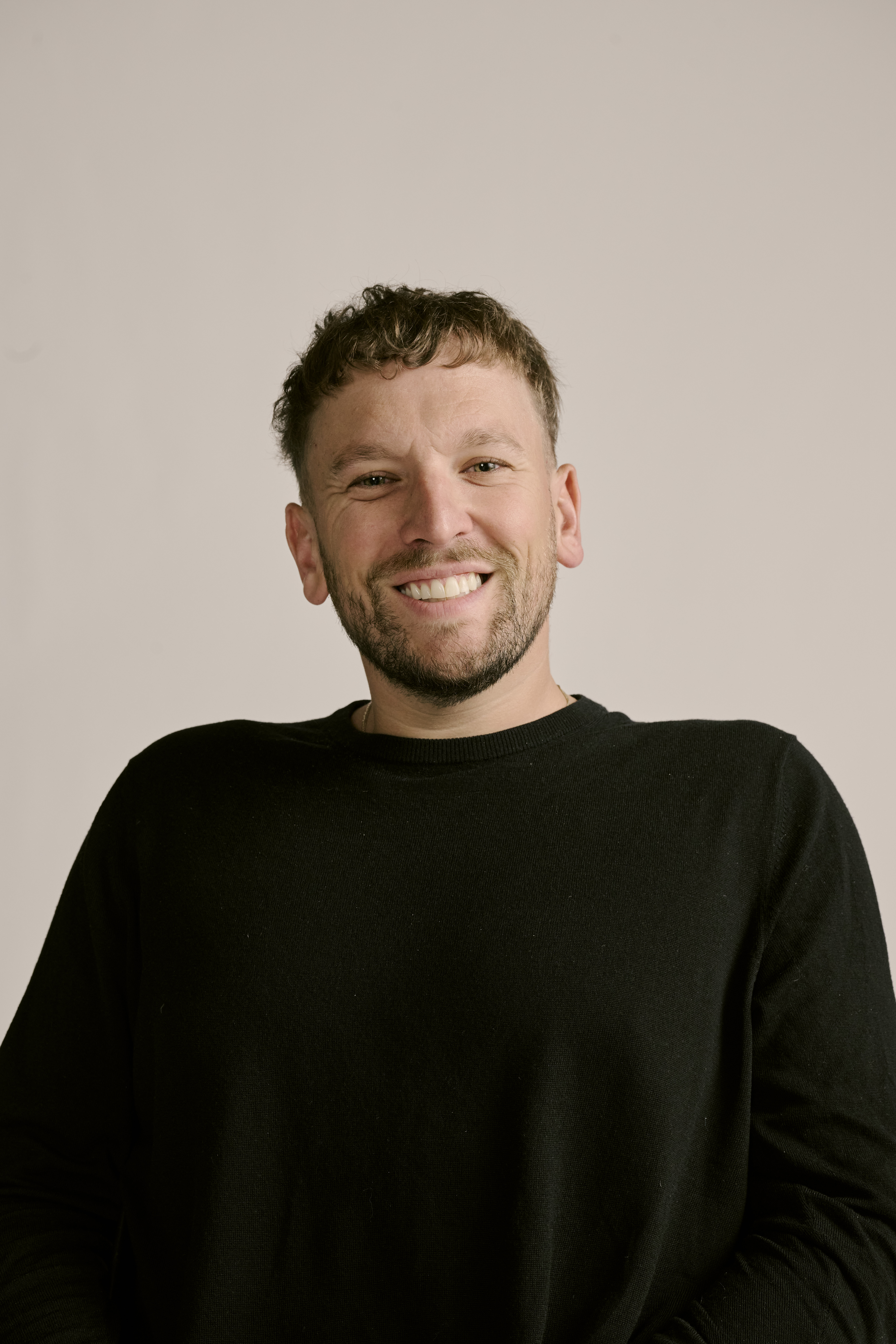
- 2025 portrait of Alcott
- Country (sports): Australia
- Residence: Hampton East, Victoria
- Born: 4 December 1990 (age 35) Melbourne, Victoria, Australia
- Turned pro: 2014
- Retired: 2022
- Plays: Quad, right-handed
- Official website: website

Singles
- Career record: 245–55 (81.7%)
- Highest ranking: No. 1 (29 June 2015)

Grand Slam singles results
- Australian Open: W (2015, 2016, 2017, 2018, 2019, 2020, 2021)
- French Open: W (2019, 2020, 2021)
- Wimbledon: W (2019, 2021)
- US Open: W (2015, 2018, 2021)

Other tournaments
- Masters: W (2018)
- Paralympic Games: W (2016, 2021)

Doubles
- Career record: 108–46 (70.1%)
- Highest ranking: No. 1 (9 September 2019)

Grand Slam doubles results
- Australian Open: W (2018, 2019, 2020, 2021)
- French Open: W (2019)
- Wimbledon: W (2019)
- US Open: W (2019, 2020)

Other doubles tournaments
- Paralympic Games: W (2016)
- Basketball career

Dandenong Rangers
- Position: Guard
- League: National Wheelchair Basketball League (NWBL)

Career information
- Playing career: 2004–2012

Career highlights
- NWBL Low Point MVP (2010); 4x Wheelchair Sports Victoria Junior Athlete of the Year (2004–2006 and 2008); Junior National Championships MVP (2010); Dandenong Rangers Most Improved Player (2007)
Medal record
Representing Australia
Men's wheelchair tennis
Paralympic Games
Gold medal – first place	2016 Rio de Janeiro	Quad singles
Gold medal – first place	2016 Rio de Janeiro	Quad doubles
Gold medal – first place	2020 Tokyo	Quad singles
Silver medal – second place	2020 Tokyo	Quad doubles
Men's wheelchair basketball
Paralympic Games
Gold medal – first place	2008 Beijing	Team
Silver medal – second place	2012 London	Team
World Championship
Gold medal – first place	2010 Birmingham	Team
Bronze medal – third place	2006 Amsterdam	Team
- Last updated on: 27 January 2022.

Dylan Martin Alcott, AO (born 4 December 1990) is an Australian former wheelchair tennis player, former wheelchair basketball player, radio host, actor, foundation founder, business owner and motivational speaker. Alcott was a member of the Australia men's national wheelchair basketball team, known colloquially as the Australian "Rollers". At the age of 17, he became the youngest Rollers gold medal winner, at the 2008 Beijing Paralympics, and was the youngest to compete in the wheelchair basketball competition. In 2014, he returned to wheelchair tennis with the aim of participating at the 2016 Rio Paralympics, at which he won gold medals in the Men's Quad Singles and Doubles. He was named the 2016 Australian Paralympian of the Year due to his outstanding achievements at Rio.

Alcott is the only man to complete the Golden Slam in quad singles, winning all four majors and the Paralympics in 2021. In addition, he also won a separate non-calendar-year Grand Slam in quad singles between 2018 and 2019. He is also the only man to complete the Grand Slam in quad doubles, winning all four major titles in 2019.

Alongside his sporting career, Alcott hosted the weekend afternoon radio show on Australian radio station Triple J, and the ABC live music show The Set, as well as being a commentator for the 2019 Australian Open. He also was a member of the panel on the AFL Footy Show in 2019 until its cancellation.

In 2022, Alcott was named Australian of the Year and was made an Officer of the Order of Australia. A portrait by Felix von Dallwitz titled Dylan Alcott, AOTY was a finalist in the 2022 Archibald Prize.

== Early life ==
Dylan Martin Alcott was born in Melbourne, Victoria, on 4 December 1990, to parents Martin and Resie. He has an older brother named Zack. He was born with a tumour wrapped around his spinal cord which was operated on during the first few weeks of his life. The tumour was successfully cut out; however, it left Alcott a paraplegic, requiring him to use a wheelchair.

Alcott attended Brighton Grammar School from year 6, and competed for Victoria in swimming, and Australia for wheelchair tennis and wheelchair basketball. Alcott graduated Brighton Grammar school in 2008.

Alcott's first sport of choice was wheelchair tennis, where he represented Australia on numerous occasions, reaching a ranking of 100 in the world by age 16 (4th in the world for under-18s).

== Basketball ==
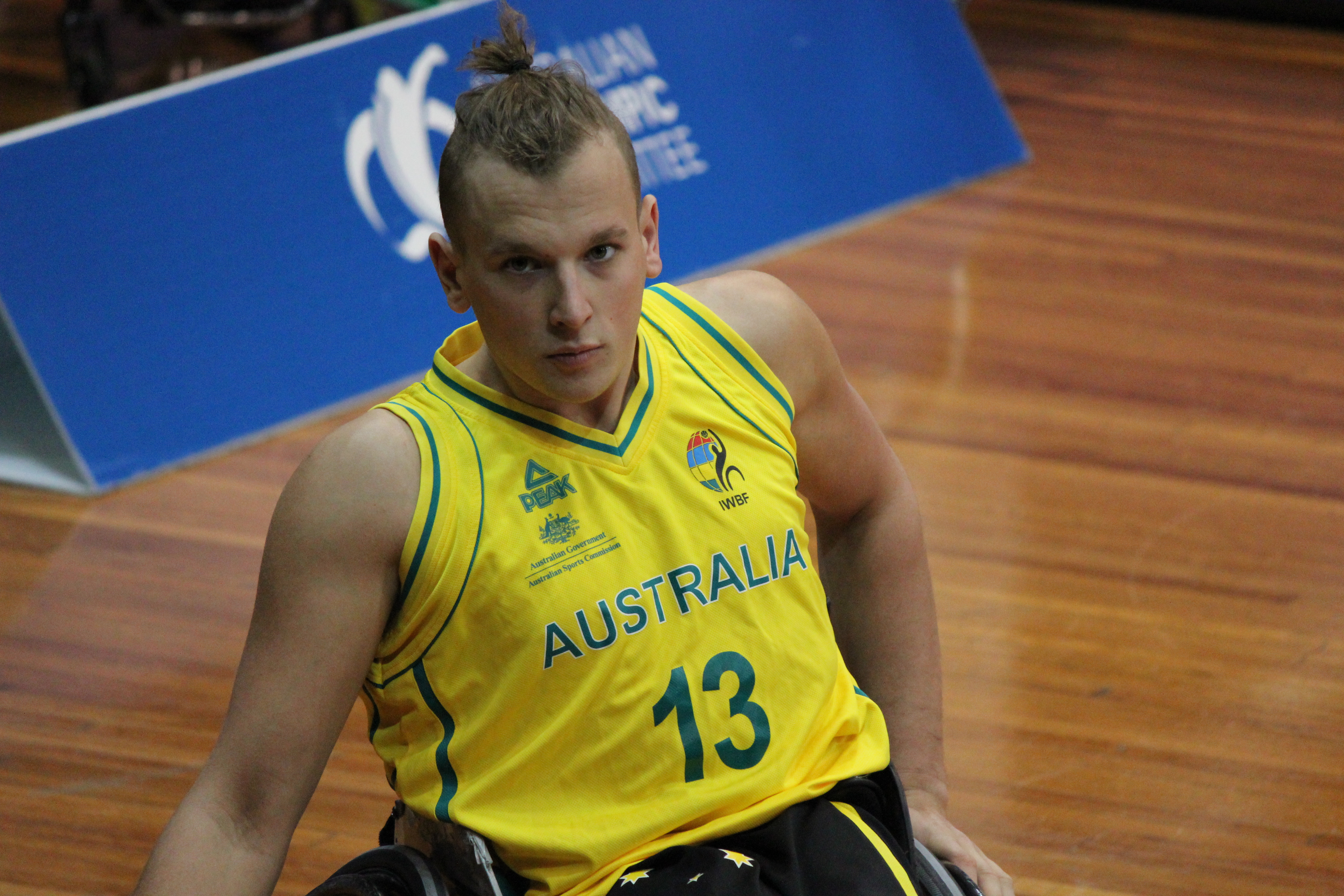
Alcott in a game versus Great Britain

Alcott played his first game of wheelchair basketball aged 14. Alcott made his debut for the Australia men's national wheelchair basketball team, the Rollers, at the 2006 Wheelchair Basketball World Championship, where the team won the bronze medal. Alcott continued to hold his spot and was a member of the Rollers when the team travelled to the Beijing Olympic warm-up tournament in January 2008. Alcott made his name in basketball through his performances in the national league competition, competing for the Dandenong Rangers (no affiliation with the female team of the same name) and being selected in the all-star team for 2008. He has achieved success through junior competition as well, being named the Most Valuable Player at the Junior National Basketball Championships.

Alcott was part of the gold medal-winning Rollers team at the 2008 Summer Paralympics, for which he received a Medal of the Order of Australia. In his first Paralympics, Alcott was quoted: "To be 17 and win gold... well it just doesn't get any better than that."

In 2009, Alcott accepted a scholarship at the University of Illinois at Urbana–Champaign, where he went on to win the College Championship division with the University of Illinois wheelchair basketball team. After one year of study, he decided to move back to Melbourne to train for the 2012 London Paralympic Games.

In 2010, Alcott was a part of the Rollers' success at the 2010 Wheelchair Basketball World Championship in Birmingham, England. It was the first world championship the Australian wheelchair basketball team had ever won, and Alcott was named in the World All Star 5 for the tournament.

At the 2012 Summer Paralympics, Alcott was part of the Australian men's wheelchair team that won silver.

== Tennis ==
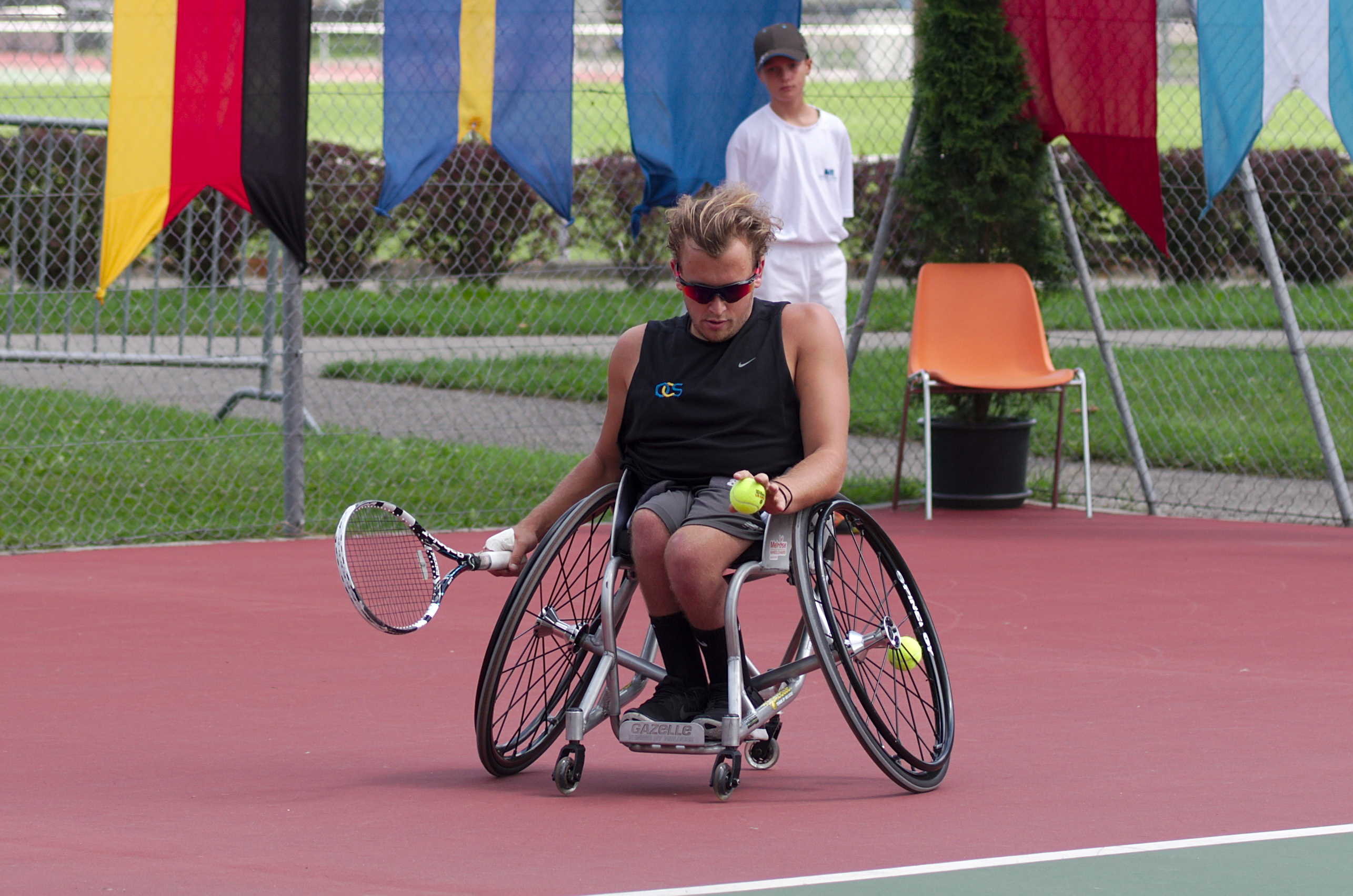
Alcott during the 2014 Swiss Open in Geneva

In 2014, Alcott returned to wheelchair tennis. At the age of 16, he was ranked inside the top five juniors in the world. In July 2014, he defeated world number three Andy Lapthorne 7–5, 6–1 in the British Open Wheelchair Tennis Championship final in Nottingham to win his first Super Series crown. Early in the year, he won the New Zealand Open in just his second tournament appearance. In January 2015, he won the quad wheelchair Australian Open title by defeating David Wagner in straight sets. It was his maiden grand slam title. At the conclusion on 2015, he was ranked number 1 after winning eight titles including two grand slam singles titles.

Alcott teamed up with Heath Davidson to win the Men's Quad Doubles gold medal at the 2016 Rio Paralympics. They defeated the reigning champions David Wagner and Nick Taylor in the gold medal match 4–6, 6–4, 7–5. The day after winning gold in the Men's Doubles, he defeated Andy Lapthorne 6–3, 6–4 to win the gold medal in the Men's Quad Singles.

In 2018, Alcott won his first Wheelchair Tennis Masters title in the Quads singles event.

=== Golden Slam: 2021 ===
In 2021, Alcott became the third professional tennis player and only male player to win the calendar-year Golden Slam, winning singles titles in the Australian Open, French Open, Wimbledon, US Open and the singles gold medal at the 2020 Summer Paralympics. He joined fellow professional wheelchair tennis player Diede de Groot in achieving the feat in 2021. They were the first two professional tennis players since Steffi Graf in 1988 to accomplish the feat.

After winning the Paralympics gold medal, Alcott announced he would not be featuring in the 2024 Paris Paralympics, retiring from the competition. In November 2021, Alcott announced his intention to retire from professional tennis entirely following the January 2022 Australian Open.

== Television presenting ==
Alcott has hosted Invictus Games Today, alongside Chris Bath and Anthony "Lehmo" Lehmann, and ABC's live music show The Set with Linda Marigliano. He is a TV Week Logie award winner.

== Personal life ==
Alcott's return to wheelchair tennis after playing basketball resulted from an injury sustained in the lead-up to the 2012 Summer Paralympics. At an event, an inebriated person attempted to lift Alcott out of his wheelchair, leading to a fall in which Alcott sustained cuts from broken glass on the floor. He required a full hand reconstruction; once rehabilitated, he became eligible for a quad classification in tennis.

Alcott has a Commerce degree from the University of Melbourne. He currently works as a motivational speaker and as a radio host on Triple J. In his spare time, Alcott attends music festivals, and he has become known for his "wheelchair crowdsurfing". In 2018, he launched Ability Fest, a universally accessible music festival, featuring pathways for wheelchairs, quiet areas for people with sensory disabilities, and Auslan (Australian Sign Language) interpreters.

Alcott's advice to young people with a disability is: "The biggest thing is that for every one thing you can't do, there are 10,000 others you can. For every one idiot to give you a hard time, there are 10,000 others worth your time."

In 2017, Alcott established the Dylan Alcott Foundation "with the core purpose of helping young Australians with disabilities gain self-esteem and respect through sport and study". In September 2017, Alcott was appointed Australian Patron for International Day of People with Disability.

Alcott's autobiography, Able: Gold Medals, Grand Slams and Smashing Glass Ceilings, written with help by Grantlee Kieza, was published by ABC Books in 2018. Alcott has also released the book in audiobook form, reading the book himself.

Alcott's partner is sex therapist Chantelle Otten.

On 10 October 2023, Alcott was one of 25 Australians of the Year who signed an open letter supporting the Yes vote in the Indigenous Voice referendum, initiated by psychiatrist Patrick McGorry.

== Tennis career statistics ==
=== Performance timelines ===
Key
W	F	SF	QF	#R	RR	Q#	P#	DNQ	A	Z#	PO	G	S	B	NMS	NTI	P	NH

(W) winner; (F) finalist; (SF) semifinalist; (QF) quarterfinalist; (#R) rounds 4, 3, 2, 1; (RR) round-robin stage; (Q#) qualification round; (P#) preliminary round; (DNQ) did not qualify; (A) absent; (Z#) Davis/Fed Cup Zonal Group (with number indication) or (PO) play-off; (G) gold, (S) silver or (B) bronze Olympic/Paralympic medal; (NMS) not a Masters tournament; (NTI) not a Tier I tournament; (P) postponed; (NH) not held; (SR) strike rate (events won / competed); (W–L) win–loss record.
To avoid confusion and double counting, these charts are updated at the conclusion of a tournament or when the player's participation has ended.

Current through 2021 US Open.

==== Quad singles ====
Tournament	2014	2015	2016	2017	2018	2019	2020	2021	2022	SR	W–L
Grand Slam Tournaments
Australian Open	RR	W	W	W	W	W	W	W	F	7 / 9	29–4
French Open	Not held					W	W	W	A	3 / 3	6–0
Wimbledon	Not held					W	NH	W	A	2 / 2	4–0
US Open	A	W	NH	RR	W	F	F	W	A	3 / 6	18–4
Win–loss	1–2	7–1	4–0	6–1	7–1	11–1	9–1	10–0	2–1	15/20	57–8
Year-end championship
Wheelchair Tennis Masters	F	A	A	A	W	A	NH	A	A	1 / 2	7–1
Paralympic Games
Summer Paralympics	Not held		G	Not held				G	NH	2 / 2	8–0

==== Quad doubles ====
Tournament	2014	2015	2016	2017	2018	2019	2020	2021	2022	SR	W–L
Australian Open	F	F	F	F	W	W	W	W	SF	4 / 9	5–5
French Open	Not held					W	F	F	A	1 / 3	1–2
Wimbledon	Not held				F (Note: Exhibition match.)	W	NH	F	A	1 / 3	1–2
US Open	A	F	NH	F	F	W	W	F	A	2 / 6	2–4
Win–loss	0–1	0–2	0–1	0–2	1–2	4–0	2–1	2–2	0–1	8 / 19	9–13
Paralympic Games
Summer Paralympics	Not held		G	Not held				S	NH	1 / 2	4–1

=== Grand Slam finals ===
==== Quad singles: 18 (15 titles, 3 runner-ups) ====
Result	Year	Tournament	Surface	Opponent	Score
Win	2015	Australian Open	Hard	(United States) David Wagner	6–2, 6–3
Win	2015	US Open	Hard	(United States) David Wagner	6–1, 4–6, 7–5
Win	2016	Australian Open (2)	Hard	(United States) David Wagner	6–2, 6–2
Win	2017	Australian Open (3)	Hard	(United Kingdom) Andy Lapthorne	6–2, 6–2
Win	2018	Australian Open (4)	Hard	(United States) David Wagner	7–6, 6–1
Win	2018	US Open (2)	Hard	(United States) David Wagner	7–5, 6–2
Win	2019	Australian Open (5)	Hard	(United States) David Wagner	6–4, 7–6^{(7–2)}
Win	2019	French Open	Clay	(United States) David Wagner	6–2, 4–6, 6–2
Win	2019	Wimbledon	Grass	(United Kingdom) Andy Lapthorne	6–0, 6–2
Loss	2019	US Open	Hard	(United Kingdom) Andy Lapthorne	1–6, 0–6
Win	2020	Australian Open (6)	Hard	(United Kingdom) Andy Lapthorne	6–0, 6–4
Loss	2020	US Open	Hard	(Netherlands) Sam Schröder	6–7^{(5–7)}, 6–0, 4–6
Win	2020	French Open (2)	Clay	(United Kingdom) Andy Lapthorne	6–2, 6–2
Win	2021	Australian Open (7)	Hard	(Netherlands) Sam Schröder	6–1, 6–0
Win	2021	French Open (3)	Clay	(Netherlands) Sam Schröder	6–4, 6–2
Win	2021	Wimbledon (2)	Grass	(Netherlands) Sam Schröder	6–2, 6–2
Win	2021	US Open (3)	Hard	(Netherlands) Niels Vink	7–5, 6–2
Loss	2022	Australian Open	Hard	(Netherlands) Sam Schröder	5–7, 0–6

==== Quad doubles: 19 (8 titles, 11 runner-ups) ====
Result	Year	Tournament	Surface	Partner	Opponents	Score
Loss	2014	Australian Open	Hard	(South Africa) Lucas Sithole	(United Kingdom) Andy Lapthorne (United States) David Wagner	4–6, 4–6
Loss	2015	Australian Open	Hard	(South Africa) Lucas Sithole	(United Kingdom) Andy Lapthorne (United States) David Wagner	0–6, 6–3, 2–6
Loss	2015	US Open	Hard	(United Kingdom) Andy Lapthorne	(United States) Nicholas Taylor (United States) David Wagner	6–4, 2–6, [7–10]
Loss	2016	Australian Open	Hard	(United Kingdom) Andy Lapthorne	(South Africa) Lucas Sithole (United States) David Wagner	1–6, 3–6
Loss	2017	Australian Open	Hard	(Australia) Heath Davidson	(United Kingdom) Andy Lapthorne (United States) David Wagner	3–6, 3–6
Loss	2017	US Open	Hard	(United States) Bryan Barten	(United Kingdom) Andy Lapthorne (United States) David Wagner	5–7, 2–6
Win	2018	Australian Open	Hard	(Australia) Heath Davidson	(United Kingdom) Andy Lapthorne (United States) David Wagner	6–0, 6–7^{(5–7)}, [10–6]
Loss	2018	US Open	Hard	(United States) Bryan Barten	(United Kingdom) Andy Lapthorne (United States) David Wagner	6–3, 0–6, [4–10]
Win	2019	Australian Open (2)	Hard	(Australia) Heath Davidson	(United Kingdom) Andy Lapthorne (United States) David Wagner	6–3, 6–7^{(6–8)}, [12–10]
Win	2019	French Open	Clay	(United States) David Wagner	(Brazil) Ymanitu Silva (Japan) Koji Sugeno	6–3, 6–3
Win	2019	Wimbledon	Grass	(United Kingdom) Andy Lapthorne	(Japan) Koji Sugeno (United States) David Wagner	6–2, 7–6^{(7–4)}
Win	2019	US Open	Hard	(United Kingdom) Andy Lapthorne	(United States) Bryan Barten (United States) David Wagner	6–7^{(5–7)}, 6–1, [10–6]
Win	2020	Australian Open (3)	Hard	(Australia) Heath Davidson	(United Kingdom) Andy Lapthorne (United States) David Wagner	6–4, 6–3
Win	2020	US Open (2)	Hard	(United Kingdom) Andy Lapthorne	(Netherlands) Sam Schröder (United States) David Wagner	3–6, 6–4, [10–8]
Loss	2020	French Open	Clay	(United Kingdom) Andy Lapthorne	(Netherlands) Sam Schröder (United States) David Wagner	6–4, 5–7, [8–10]
Win	2021	Australian Open (4)	Hard	(Australia) Heath Davidson	(United Kingdom) Andy Lapthorne (United States) David Wagner	6–2, 3–6, [10–7]
Loss	2021	French Open	Clay	(Netherlands) Sam Schröder	(United Kingdom) Andy Lapthorne (United States) David Wagner	6–7^{(1–7)}, 6–4, [7–10]
Loss	2021	Wimbledon	Grass	(Netherlands) Sam Schröder	(United Kingdom) Andy Lapthorne (United States) David Wagner	1–6, 6–3, 4–6
Loss	2021	US Open	Hard	(Australia) Heath Davidson	(Netherlands) Sam Schröder (Netherlands) Niels Vink	3–6, 2–6

=== Paralympic gold medal matches ===
==== Quad singles: 2 (2 Gold medals) ====
Result	Year	Tournament	Surface	Opponent	Score
Gold	2016	Summer Paralympics	Hard	(United Kingdom) Andy Lapthorne	6–3, 6–4
Gold	2021	Summer Paralympics (2)	Hard	(Netherlands) Sam Schröder	7–6^{(7–2)}, 6–1

==== Quad doubles: 2 (1 Gold medal, 1 Silver medal) ====
Result	Year	Tournament	Surface	Partner	Opponents	Score
Gold	2016	Summer Paralympics	Hard	(Australia) Heath Davidson	(United States) Nick Taylor (United States) David Wagner	4–6, 6–4, 7–5
Silver	2021	Summer Paralympics	Hard	(Australia) Heath Davidson	(Netherlands) Sam Schröder (Netherlands) Niels Vink	4–6, 3–6

== Recognition ==
- 2009 – Medal of the Order of Australia
- 2015 – Tennis Australia Newcombe Medal nominee
- 2015 – Tennis Australia Most Outstanding Athlete with a Disability
- 2015 – Victorian Institute of Sport Award of Excellence
- 2016 – Governor's Award for Victorian Sportsperson of the Year
- 2016 – Finalist for 'The Don Award' Sport Australia Hall of Fame awards
- 2016 – Australian Paralympian of the Year and Australian Male Paralympian of the Year
- 2016 – Tennis Australia Awards – Newcombe Medal and shared the Most Outstanding Athlete with a Disability with doubles partner Heath Davidson
- 2016 – Victorian Institute of Sport Elite Athlete with a Disability Award
- 2018 – International Tennis Federation Quad Wheelchair World Champion
- 2019 – Logie Awards – Graham Kennedy Award for Most Popular New Talent
- 2019 – Victorian Institute of Sport Elite Athlete with a Disability Award
- 2019 – Tennis Australia Most Outstanding Athlete with a Disability
- 2022 – Victorian State Representative Australian of the Year
- 2021 – Governor's Award Victorian Male Athlete of the Year – Frank Wilkes Award
- 2022 – Australian of the Year
- 2022 – Officer of the Order of Australia for "distinguished service to paralympic sport, particularly to tennis, and as a role model for people with disability, and to the community through a range of organisations."
- 2026 – Inducted into the Sport Australia Hall of Fame as an athlete member.

== See also ==
- List of quad wheelchair tennis champions
