= 2018 US Open – Wheelchair women's doubles =

Wheelchair women's doubles
- 2018 US Open

Final
- Champions: (Netherlands) Diede de Groot (Japan) Yui Kamiji
- Runners-up: (Netherlands) Marjolein Buis (Netherlands) Aniek van Koot
- Score: 6–3, 6–4

Events
| Singles | men | women | | boys | girls |
| Doubles | men | women | mixed | boys | girls |
| WC Singles | men | women | quad |
| WC Doubles | men | women | quad |
| Legends | men | women | mixed |
| ← 2017 · | US Open | · 2019 → |

Defending champion Diede de Groot and her partner Yui Kamiji defeated the other defending champion Marjolein Buis and her partner Aniek van Koot in the final, 6–3, 6–4 to win the women's doubles wheelchair tennis title at the 2018 US Open. With the win, Kamiji completed the double career Grand Slam.

== Seeds ==
1. (Netherlands) Diede de Groot / (Japan) Yui Kamiji (champions)
2. (Netherlands) Marjolein Buis / (Netherlands) Aniek van Koot (final)

== Draw ==
=== Key ===
- Q = Qualifier
- WC = Wild card
- LL = Lucky loser
- Alt = Alternate
- ITF = ITF entry
- PR = Protected ranking
- SR = Special ranking
- SE = Special exempt
- JE = Junior exempt
- JR = Junior Accelerator Programme entrant
- CO = College Accelerator Programme entrant
- NG = Next Gen Accelerator Program entrant
- w/o = Walkover
- r = Retired
- d = Defaulted

=== Bracket ===
Semifinals
1 | (Netherlands) Diede de Groot (Japan) Yui Kamiji | 6 | 6
(Germany) Sabine Ellerbrock (United Kingdom) Lucy Shuker | 0 | 0
(United States) Dana Mathewson (South Africa) Kgothatso Montjane | 1 | 1
2 | (Netherlands) Marjolein Buis (Netherlands) Aniek van Koot | 6 | 6

Final
1 | (Netherlands) Diede de Groot (Japan) Yui Kamiji | 6 | 6
2 | (Netherlands) Marjolein Buis (Netherlands) Aniek van Koot | 3 | 4
