= Duarte Vale =

Portuguese tennis player (born 1999)

- Country (sports): Portugal
- Born: 11 January 1999 (age 27) Cascais, Portugal
- Height: 1.83 m (6 ft 0 in)
- Plays: Right-handed (two-handed backhand)
- College: Florida
- Prize money: $91,740

Singles
- Career record: 0–0 (at ATP Tour level, Grand Slam level, and in Davis Cup)
- Career titles: 2 ITF
- Highest ranking: No. 474 (27 January 2025)
- Current ranking: No. 1,295 (15 December 2025)

Doubles
- Career record: 0–0 (at ATP Tour level, Grand Slam level, and in Davis Cup)
- Career titles: 4 ITF
- Highest ranking: No. 366 (12 June 2023)
- Last updated on: 16 December 2025.

Duarte Vale (born 11 January 1999) is a Portuguese tennis player. Vale has a career high ATP singles ranking of world No. 474 achieved on 27 January 2025 and a career high ATP doubles ranking of No. 366 achieved on 12 June 2023.

== Career ==
Vale played college tennis with Ben Shelton at the University of Florida.

Vale reached the final of the Australian Open junior doubles tournament in 2017 with Finn Reynolds, losing to Hsu Yu-hsiou and Zhao Lingxi.

Vale made his ATP main draw debut at the 2023 Estoril Open after receiving a wildcard into the doubles main draw with Ben Shelton.

== Challenger and World Tennis Tour Finals ==
=== Singles: 8 (2–6) ===
Legend ATP Challenger Tour (0–0) ITF World Tennis Tour (2–6)	Finals by surface Hard (2–4) Clay (0–2) Grass (0–0) Carpet (0–0)

Result	W–L	Date	Tournament	Tier	Surface	Opponent	Score
Loss	0–1	Aug 2021	M15 Monastir, Tunisia	World Tennis Tour	Hard	(Italy) Luciano Darderi	2–6, 2–6
Loss	0–2	Oct 2021	M15 Naples, USA	World Tennis Tour	Clay	(China) Shang Juncheng	3–6, 6–7^{(3–7)}
Win	1–2	Jun 2022	M15 San Diego, USA	World Tennis Tour	Hard	(United States) Nathan Ponwith	4–6, 7–6^{(9–7)}, 7–5
Loss	1–3	Sep 2022	M25 Sintra, Portugal	World Tennis Tour	Hard	(India) Mukund Sasikumar	6–7^{(6–8)}, 6–3, 0–6
Win	2–3	Apr 2023	M15 Monastir, Tunisia	World Tennis Tour	Hard	(Australia) Li Tu	6–3, 3–0, ret.
Loss	2–4	Oct 2023	M15 Norman, USA	World Tennis Tour	Hard (i)	(United States) Learner Tien	6–7^{(6–8)}, 2–6
Loss	2–5	Apr 2024	M15 Orange Park, USA	World Tennis Tour	Clay	(France) Corentin Denolly	3–6, 5–7
Loss	2–6	Jun 2024	M25 Elvas, Portugal	World Tennis Tour	Hard	(France) Antoine Escoffier	3–6, 2–6

=== Doubles: 8 (5–3) ===
Legend (doubles) ATP Challenger (0–0) ITF World Tennis Tour (5–3)	Titles by surface Hard (4–3) Clay (1–0) Grass (0–0) Carpet (0–0)

Result	W–L	Date	Tournament	Tier	Surface	Partner	Opponents	Score
Loss	0–1	Oct 2021	M15 Naples, USA	World Tennis Tour	Hard	(Denmark) Johannes Ingildsen	(United States) Bruno Kuzuhara (Jordan) Abedallah Shelbayh	4–6, 1–6
Win	1–1	Oct 2021	M15 Vero Beach, USA	World Tennis Tour	Hard	(Denmark) Johannes Ingildsen	(Canada) Liam Draxl (United States) Ben Shelton	6–3, 6–4
Win	2–1	Nov 2021	M25 Austin, USA	World Tennis Tour	Hard	(United States) Alfredo Perez	(South Africa) Philip Henning (South Africa) Joubert Klopper	7–6^{(7–1)}, 6–2
Win	3–1	Jul 2022	M25 Idanha-a-Nova, Portugal	World Tennis Tour	Hard	(Portugal) Martim Leote Prata	(Portugal) Pedro Araújo (Portugal) Jaime Faria	6–3, 6–4
Win	4–1	Sep 2022	M25 Sintra, Portugal	World Tennis Tour	Hard	(United States) Alfredo Perez	(Portugal) Fábio Coelho (Portugal) Jaime Faria	6–3, 4–6, [10–8]
Loss	4–2	Jul 2023	M25 Porto, Portugal	World Tennis Tour	Hard	(Chile) Diego Fernández Flores	(United Kingdom) Arthur Fery (United Kingdom) Stuart Parker	1–6, 3–6
Win	5–2	Apr 2024	M15 Orange Park, United States	World Tennis Tour	Clay	(France) Corentin Denolly	(United States) Sekou Bangoura (United States) Boris Kozlov	4–6, 7–5, [10–8]
Loss	5–3	Jul 2024	M25 East Lansing, United States	World Tennis Tour	Hard	(United Kingdom) Ben Jones	(Antigua and Barbuda) Jody Maginley (United States) Joshua Sheehy	5–7, 2–6
