= Zhao Lingxi =

Chinese tennis player

Zhao Lingxi 赵灵熙
- Country (sports): China
- Born: 7 January 2000 (age 26) Tianjin, China
- Plays: Left-handed (two handed-backhand)
- Prize money: US $7,767

Singles
- Career record: 0–0
- Career titles: 0
- Highest ranking: No. 1,087 (27 August 2018)
- Current ranking: No. 1,824 (24 August 2026)

Grand Slam singles results
- Australian Open Junior: 1R (2017)
- French Open Junior: Q1 (2016)
- Wimbledon Junior: Q1 (2016)
- US Open Junior: Q1 (2016)

Doubles
- Career record: 0–0
- Career titles: 0
- Highest ranking: No. 1,950 (12 August 2019)

Grand Slam doubles results
- Australian Open Junior: W (2017)
- Last updated on: 27 August 2026.

Zhao Lingxi (Chinese: 赵灵熙; pinyin: Zhào Língxī; Mandarin pronunciation: [ʈʂâʊ lǐŋ ɕí]; born 7 January 2000) is a Chinese junior tennis player. Zhao has a career high ATP singles ranking of No. 1,087 achieved on 27 August 2018 and a doubles ranking of No. 1,950 achieved on 12 August 2019.

On the junior tour Zhao has a career high ranking of 24 achieved on 30 January 2017. Zhao won the 2017 Australian Open boys' doubles championships alongside Hsu Yu-hsiou.

== Junior Grand Slam finals ==
=== Doubles: 1 (1 title) ===
Result	Year	Tournament	Surface	Partner	Opponent	Score
Winner	2017	Australian Open	Hard	(Chinese Taipei) Hsu Yu-hsiou	(New Zealand) Finn Reynolds (Portugal) Duarte Vale	6–7^{(8–10)}, 6–4, [10–5]
