= 2018 US Open – Wheelchair quad singles =

Wheelchair quad singles
- 2018 US Open

Final
- Champion: (Australia) Dylan Alcott
- Runner-up: (United States) David Wagner
- Score: 7–5, 6–2

Events
Singles	men	women		boys	girls
Doubles	men	women	mixed	boys	girls
WC Singles	men	women	quad
WC Doubles	men	women	quad
Legends	men	women	mixed
← 2017 ·	US Open	· 2019 →

Dylan Alcott defeated the defending champion David Wagner in the final, 7–5, 6–2 to win the quad singles wheelchair tennis title at the 2018 US Open.

== Seeds ==
1. (United States) David Wagner (final)
2. (Australia) Dylan Alcott (champion)

== Draw ==
=== Key ===
- Q = Qualifier
- WC = Wild card
- LL = Lucky loser
- Alt = Alternate
- SE = Special exempt
- PR = Protected ranking
- ITF = ITF entry
- JE = Junior exempt
- w/o = Walkover
- r = Retired
- d = Defaulted
- SR = Special ranking

=== Final ===
Final
2	(Australia) Dylan Alcott	7	6
1	(United States) David Wagner	5	2

=== Round robin ===
		(United States) Wagner	(Australia) Alcott	(United Kingdom) Lapthorne	(United States) Barten	RR W–L	Set W–L	Game W–L	Standings
1	(United States) David Wagner		3–6, 5–7	6–2, 6–4	6–0, 6–1	2–1	4–2 (67%)	32–20 (62%)	2
2	(Australia) Dylan Alcott	6–3, 7–5		6–0, 3–6, 6–0	6–3, 6–1	3–0	6–1 (86%)	40–18 (69%)	1
	(United Kingdom) Andrew Lapthorne	2–6, 4–6	0–6, 6–3, 0–6		6–1, 6–4	1–2	3–4 (43%)	24–32 (43%)	3
WC	(United States) Bryan Barten	0–6, 1–6	3–6, 1–6	1–6, 4–6		0–3	0–6 (0%)	10–36 (22%)	4

Standings are determined by: 1. number of wins; 2. number of matches; 3. in two-players-ties, head-to-head records; 4. in three-players-ties, percentage of sets won, or of games won; 5. steering-committee decision.
