= 2020 US Open – Wheelchair men's doubles =

Wheelchair men's doubles
- 2020 US Open

Final
- Champions: (United Kingdom) Alfie Hewett (United Kingdom) Gordon Reid
- Runners-up: (France) Stéphane Houdet (France) Nicolas Peifer
- Score: 6–4, 6–1

Events
| Singles | men | women | | boys | girls |
| Doubles | men | women | mixed | boys | girls |
| WC Singles | men | women | quad |
| WC Doubles | men | women | quad |
| Legends | men | women | mixed |
| ← 2019 · | US Open | · 2021 → |

Three-time defending champions Alfie Hewett and Gordon Reid defeated Stéphane Houdet and Nicolas Peifer in a rematch of the 2018 final, 6–4, 6–1 to win the men's doubles wheelchair tennis title at the 2020 US Open.

== Seeds ==
1. (United Kingdom) Alfie Hewett / (United Kingdom) Gordon Reid (champions)
2. (France) Stéphane Houdet / (France) Nicolas Peifer (final)

== Draw ==
=== Key ===
- Q = Qualifier
- WC = Wild card
- LL = Lucky loser
- Alt = Alternate
- ITF = ITF entry
- PR = Protected ranking
- SR = Special ranking
- SE = Special exempt
- JE = Junior exempt
- JR = Junior Accelerator Programme entrant
- CO = College Accelerator Programme entrant
- NG = Next Gen Accelerator Program entrant
- w/o = Walkover
- r = Retired
- d = Defaulted

=== Bracket ===
Semifinals
1 | (United Kingdom) Alfie Hewett (United Kingdom) Gordon Reid | 6 | 6
(Argentina) Gustavo Fernández (Japan) Shingo Kunieda | 3 | 3
(Belgium) Joachim Gérard (United States) Casey Ratzlaff | 2 | 1
2 | (France) Stéphane Houdet (France) Nicolas Peifer | 6 | 6

Final
1 | (United Kingdom) Alfie Hewett (United Kingdom) Gordon Reid | 6 | 6
2 | (France) Stéphane Houdet (France) Nicolas Peifer | 4 | 1
