= Newcombe Medal =

- Awarded for: Outstanding achievements for Australian tennis
- Country: Australia
- Presented by: Tennis Australia
- First award: 3 December 2010; 15 years ago
- Website: Newcombe Medal

The Newcombe Medal celebrates and recognizes the performances, achievements, and contributions made by members of the Australian tennis family each year. The awards are named after Australian tennis player John Newcombe. The awards are presented annually at an event in the latter months of the year. The inaugural year was 2010.

== Athlete Awards ==
=== Newcombe Medal ===
The Newcombe Medal is awarded to Australia's most outstanding elite tennis player for the year. Nominees for the award are selected by a panel of Australian champions and individuals in the tennis community. The award is named in honour of the achievements of Australian tennis player John Newcombe.

Winner

Season	Nominees			
Season	Player / Team	Ranking	Tour	Origin
2010	Samantha Stosur	No. 6 (Singles)	WTA	Brisbane
2010	Lleyton Hewitt	No. 54 (Singles)	ATP	Adelaide
2010	Anastasia Rodionova	No. 26 (Doubles)	WTA	Melbourne
2010	Jarmila Gajdošová	No. 42 (Singles)	WTA	Melbourne
2011	Samantha Stosur (2)	No. 6 (Singles)	WTA	Brisbane
2011	Jarmila Gajdošová	No. 33 (Singles)	WTA	Melbourne
2011	Matthew Ebden	No. 86 (Singles)	ATP	Perth
2011	Bernard Tomic	No. 42 (Singles)	ATP	Gold Coast
2012	Samantha Stosur (3)	No. 9 (Singles)	WTA	Brisbane
2012	Marinko Matosevic	No. 49 (Singles)	ATP	Melbourne
2012	Lleyton Hewitt	No. 80 (Singles)	ATP	Adelaide
2012	Casey Dellacqua	No. 88 (Singles)	WTA	Perth
2013	Lleyton Hewitt	No. 60 (Singles)	ATP	Adelaide
2013	Marinko Matosevic	No. 61 (Singles)	ATP	Melbourne
2013	Ashleigh Barty; Casey Dellacqua	No. 12 (Doubles); No. 10 (Doubles)	WTA	Ipswich; Perth
2014	Nick Kyrgios	No. 52 (Singles)	ATP	Canberra
2014	Samantha Stosur	No. 23 (Singles)	WTA	Brisbane
2014	Lleyton Hewitt	No. 50 (Singles)	ATP	Adelaide
2014	Casey Dellacqua	No. 29 (Singles)	WTA	Perth
2015	Sam Groth	No. 60 (Singles)	ATP	Narrandera
2015	Samantha Stosur	No. 27 (Singles)	WTA	Brisbane
2015	Thanasi Kokkinakis	No. 80 (Singles)	ATP	Adelaide
2015	John Peers	No. 8 (Doubles)	ATP	Melbourne
2015	Casey Dellacqua	No. 4 (Doubles)	WTA	Perth
2016	Dylan Alcott	No. 1 (Quads)	WTT	Melbourne
2016	Daria Gavrilova	No. 24 (Singles)	WTA	Melbourne
2016	John Millman	No. 84 (Singles)	ATP	Brisbane
2016	John Peers	No. 9 (Doubles)	ATP	Melbourne
2016	Samantha Stosur	No. 21 (Singles)	WTA	Brisbane
2016	Jordan Thompson	No. 79 (Singles)	ATP	Sydney
2017	Ashleigh Barty	No. 17 (Singles)	WTA	Brisbane
2017	Daria Gavrilova	No. 25 (Singles)	WTA	Melbourne
2017	Nick Kyrgios	No. 21 (Singles)	ATP	Canberra
2017	John Peers	No. 2 (Doubles)	ATP	Melbourne
2017	Jordan Thompson	No. 63 (Singles)	ATP	Sydney
2018	Ashleigh Barty (2) / Alex de Minaur	No. 15 (Singles) / No. 31 (Singles)	WTA / ATP	Brisbane / Sydney
2018	Dylan Alcott	No. 2 (Quads)	WTT	Melbourne
2018	John Millman	No. 34 (Singles)	ATP	Brisbane
2019	Ashleigh Barty (3)	No. 1 (Singles)	WTA	Brisbane
2019	Dylan Alcott	No. 1 (Quads)	WTT	Melbourne
2019	Alex de Minaur	No. 18 (Singles)	ATP	Sydney
2019	John Millman	No. 48 (Singles)	ATP	Brisbane
2019	Ajla Tomljanović	No. 51 (Singles)	WTA	Brisbane
2020	no awards due to COVID-19 pandemic			
2021	Ashleigh Barty (4) / Dylan Alcott (2)	No. 1 (Singles) No. 1 (Quads)	WTA/ WTT	Brisbane / Melbourne
2021	John Peers	No. 13 (Doubles)	ATP	Melbourne
2021	Samantha Stosur	No. 16 (Doubles)	WTA	Brisbane
2022	Ashleigh Barty (5)	—N/a	WTA	Brisbane
2022	Alex De Minaur	No. 24 (Singles)	ATP	Sydney
2022	Matthew Ebden	No. 26 (Doubles)	ATP	Perth
2022	Storm Hunter	No. 10 (Doubles)	WTA	Rockhampton
2022	Nick Kyrgios	No. 22 (Singles); No. 13 (Doubles)	ATP	Canberra
2022	Max Purcell	No. 33 (Doubles)	ATP	Perth
2022	Ajla Tomljanović	No. 33 (Singles)	ATP	Brisbane
2023	Alex De Minaur (2)	No. 11 (Singles)	ATP	Sydney
2023	Matthew Ebden	No. 4 (Doubles)	ATP	Perth
2023	Rinky Hijikata	No. 71 (Singles); No. 23 (Doubles)	ATP	Sydney
2023	Storm Hunter	No. 1 (Doubles)	WTA	Rockhampton
2023	Max Purcell	No. 45 (Singles)	ATP	Perth
2024	Alex De Minaur (3)	No. 6 (Singles)	AT4	Sydney
2024	Matthew Ebden	No. 1 (Doubles)	ATP	Perth
2024	Alexei Popyrin	No. 23 (Singles)	AT4	Perth
2024	Jordan Thompson	No. 25 (Singles); No. 3 (Doubles)	ATP	Perth
2024	John Peers	(Doubles)	ATP	Melbourne
2024	Max Purcell	(Doubles)	ATP	Perth
2024	Olivia Gadecki	No. 83 (Singles)	WTA	Perth
2025	Alex De Minaur (4)	No. 7 (Singles)	ATP	NSW
2025	Kimberly Birrell	No. 98 (Singles)	WTA	Queensland
2025	Maya Joint	No. 32 (Singles)	WTA	Queensland
2025	Priscilla Hon	No. 119 (Singles)	WTA	Queensland
2025	Tristan Schoolkate	No. 99 (Singles)	ATP	WA
2025	Adam Walton	No. 78 (Singles)	ATP	Queensland
2026				
2026	Kimberly Birrell	No. 59 (Singles)	WTA	Queensland
2026	Alex De Minaur	No. 11 (Singles)	ATP	NSW
2026	Talia Gibson	No. 32 (Singles)	WTA	WA
2026	Rinky Hijikata	No. 59 (Singles)	ATP	NSW
2026	Taylah Preston	No. 91 (Singles)	WTA	WA

=== Female Junior Athlete of the Year Award ===
Junior athlete of the year is awarded to the player 18 years and under that is ranked number 1 in their age group (ATP/WTA/ITF/AR), has demonstrated a record of playing for Australia in teams events and has displayed a positive attitude at all times.

Year	Player	Age	Origin
2010	Ashleigh Barty	14	Ipswich
2010	Monika Wejnert	16	Brisbane
2011	Ashleigh Barty (2)	15	Ipswich
2012	Ashleigh Barty (3)	16	Ipswich
2012	Lizette Cabrera	15	Townsville
2012	Destanee Aiava	12	Melbourne
2013	Ashleigh Barty	17	Ipswich
2013	Priscilla Hon	15	Brisbane
2013	Seone Mendez	14	Sydney
2014	Destanee Aiava	14	Melbourne
2014	Kimberly Birrell	16	Hope Island
2014	Seone Mendez	15	Sydney
2015	Kimberly Birrell	17	Hope Island
2015	Jaimee Fourlis		Melbourne
2015	Priscilla Hon		Brisbane
2016	Kimberly Birrell (2)	18	Hope Island
2016	Jaimee Fourlis		Melbourne
2016	Priscilla Hon		Brisbane
2016	Maddison Inglis		Maida Vale
2017	Destanee Aiava (2)	17	Melbourne
2017	Jaimee Fourlis		Melbourne
2017	Michaela Haet		Longueville
2018	Destanee Aiava (3)	18	Melbourne
2018	Anastasia Berezov		Sydney
2018	Annerly Poulos		Canberra
2019	Talia Gibson		Western Australia
2020	no awards due to COVID-19 pandemic		
2021	Taylah Preston	16	Western Australia
2022	Taylah Preston / Talia Gibson	17 / 18	Western Australia / Western Australia
2023	Emerson Jones / Talia Gibson	15 / 19	Western Australia / Western Australia
2024	Emerson Jones / Maya Joint	16 / 18	Queensland / Queensland
2025	Emerson Jones	17	Queensland
2026	Renee Alame (NSW) / Emerson Jones (Qld) or Tahlia Kokkinis (Qld)		

=== Male Junior Athlete of the Year Award ===
Junior athlete of the year is awarded to the player 18 years and under that is ranked number 1 in their age group (ATP/WTA/ITF/AR), has demonstrated a record of playing for Australia in teams events and has displayed a positive attitude at all times.

Year	Player	Age	Origin
2010	Bernard Tomic	18	Gold Coast
2010	Jason Kubler	17	Brisbane
2010	Benjamin Mitchell	18	Gold Coast
2010	James Duckworth	18	Sydney
2011	Luke Saville	17	Berri
2012	Luke Saville (2)	18	Berri
2012	Jacob Grills	17	Ocean Grove
2012	Harry Bourchier	16	Hobart
2013	Nick Kyrgios	18	Canberra
2013	Oliver Anderson	15	Yeronga
2013	Thanasi Kokkinakis	17	Adelaide
2014	Thanasi Kokkinakis	18	Adelaide
2014	Alex de Minaur	15	Rhodes
2014	Omar Jasika	17	Clarinda
2015	Omar Jasika	18	Clarinda
2015	Alex de Minaur		Sydney
2015	Blake Ellis		Bellbowrie
2016	Alex de Minaur		Sydney
2016	Blake Ellis		Bellbowrie
2016	Alexei Popyrin		Pymble
2017	Alex de Minaur (2)		Sydney
2017	Blake Ellis		Bellbowrie
2017	Alexei Popyrin		Pymble
2018	Rinky Hijikata		
2018	Chen Dong		Brisbane
2018	Tristan Schoolkate		Perth
2019	Rinky Hijikata (2)		New South Wales
2020	no awards due to COVID-19 pandemic		
2021	Philip Sekulic	18	Queensland
2022	Edward Winter	18	South Australia
2023	Charlie Camus	17	ACT
2024	Hayden Jones	18	Queensland
2025	Cruz Hewitt		NSW
2026	Cruz Hewitt (NSW) or Novak Palombo (Vic) or Taiki Takizawa (Qld)		

=== Most Outstanding Athlete with a Disability ===
Most Outstanding Athlete with a Disability is awarded to the player ranked in the top 10, participated in at least one Grand Slam (including the Australian Tennis Championships), has demonstrated a record of playing for Australia in teams events and has displayed a positive attitude at all times.

Year	Player	Origin
2010	Daniela Di Toro	Melbourne
2010	Ben Weekes	Sydney
2010	Zvi Schweitzer	Murrumbeena
2010	Kelly Wren	Sydney
2011	Kelly Wren	Sydney
2012	Glen Flindell	Heidelberg
2012	Adam Kellerman	St Ives
2012	Zvi Schweitzer	Murrumbeena
2013	Ben Weekes	Sydney
2013	Adam Kellerman	St Ives
2013	Kelly Wren	Sydney
2014	Adam Kellerman	Newtown
2014	Dylan Alcott	St Kilda East
2014	Archie Graham	Newtown
2015	Dylan Alcott	St Kilda
2015	Glen Flindell	Yallambie
2015	Adam Kellerman	St Ives
2016	Dylan Alcott and Heath Davidson	St Kilda and Rosebud
2017	Archie Graham	Queensland
2018	Archie Graham (2)	Queensland
2018	Carla Lenarduzzi	Melbourne
2018	Kelly Wren	Sydney
2019	Dylan Alcott (3)	St Kilda
2020	no awards due to COVID-19 pandemic	
2021	Timothy Gould and Ben Weekes	Queensland and New South Wales
2022	Heath Davidson	Victoria
2023	Archie Graham	Queensland
2024	Ross Patterson	Tasmania
2025	Hunter Thompson / Jin Woodman	Queensland / Victoria
2026	Grace Hobbs (NSW) or Ross Patterson (TAS) or Hunter Thompson (Qld) or Jin Woodman (Vic)	

== Tournament Awards ==
- Most Outstanding Professional Tournament
- Most Outstanding Australian Ranking Tournament

== Community Awards ==
- Coaching Excellence Award – High Performance
- Coaching Excellence Award – Club
- Coaching Excellence Award – Tennis Hot Shots
- Coaching Excellence Award – Talent Development
- Most Outstanding Tennis Community
- Volunteer Achievement Award
- Excellence in Officiating Award
- Most Outstanding Club
- Most Outstanding School
