= 2017 Australian Open – Boys' doubles =

Boys' doubles
- 2017 Australian Open

Final
- Champions: (Chinese Taipei) Hsu Yu-hsiou (China) Zhao Lingxi
- Runners-up: (New Zealand) Finn Reynolds (Portugal) Duarte Vale
- Score: 6–7^{(8–10)}, 6–4, [10–5]

Events
Singles	men	women		boys	girls
Doubles	men	women	mixed	boys	girls
WC Singles	men	women	quad
WC Doubles	men	women	quad
Legends	men	women	mixed
- Australian Open

Alex de Minaur and Blake Ellis were the defending champions, but both players chose not to participate.

Hsu Yu-hsiou and Zhao Lingxi won the title, defeating Finn Reynolds and Duarte Vale in the final, 6–7^{(8–10)}, 6–4, [10–5].

== Seeds ==
1. (Japan) Toru Horie / (China) Wu Yibing (semifinals)
2. (Germany) Marvin Möller / (Japan) Naoki Tajima (first round)
3. (Turkey) Ergi Kırkın / (France) Corentin Moutet (first round)
4. (Chinese Taipei) Hsu Yu-hsiou / (China) Zhao Lingxi (champions)
5. (Australia) Alexei Popyrin / (Poland) Kacper Żuk (semifinals)
6. (Belgium) Zizou Bergs / (Israel) Yshai Oliel (second round)
7. (Hungary) Zsombor Piros / (Russia) Mikhail Sokolovskiy (first round)
8. (United Kingdom) Finn Bass / (United States) Trent Bryde (quarterfinals)

== Draw ==
Key

- Q = Qualifier
- WC = Wild card
- LL = Lucky loser
- Alt = Alternate
- ITF = ITF entry
- PR = Protected ranking
- SR = Special ranking
- SE = Special exempt
- JE = Junior exempt
- JR = Junior Accelerator Programme entrant
- CO = College Accelerator Programme entrant
- NG = Next Gen Accelerator Program entrant
- w/o = Walkover
- r = Retired
- d = Defaulted

=== Finals ===
Semifinals
1	(Japan) Toru Horie (China) Wu Yibing	6^{7}	6^{3}
(New Zealand) Finn Reynolds (Portugal) Duarte Vale	7^{9}	7^{7}
4	(Chinese Taipei) Hsu Yu-hsiou (China) Zhao Lingxi	6	6
5	(Australia) Alexei Popyrin (Poland) Kacper Żuk	1	3

Final
(New Zealand) Finn Reynolds (Portugal) Duarte Vale	7^{10}	4	[5]
4	(Chinese Taipei) Hsu Yu-hsiou (China) Zhao Lingxi	6^{8}	6	[10]

=== Top half ===
First round
1	(Japan) Toru Horie (China) Wu Yibing	6^{3}	6	[10]
WC	(Australia) Ken Cavrak (Australia) Sean Van Rensburg	7^{7}	2	[8]
(France) Dan Added (France) Matteo Martineau	3	6	[14]
(Republic of Ireland) Simon Carr (United Kingdom) Max Stewart	6	1	[16]
WC	(Australia) Matthew Dellavedova (Australia) Rinky Hijikata	3	6	[7]
(Netherlands) Ryan Nijboer (New Zealand) Ajeet Rai	6	3	[10]
(Japan) Shinji Hazawa (Russia) Alexey Zakharov	5	6	[10]
7	(Hungary) Zsombor Piros (Russia) Mikhail Sokolovskiy	7	3	[6]
3	(Turkey) Ergi Kırkın (France) Corentin Moutet	6	4	[7]
(New Zealand) Finn Reynolds (Portugal) Duarte Vale	1	6	[10]
(France) Maxence Brovillé (Romania) Vlad Andrei Dancu	6^{2}	6	[10]
WC	(Australia) Anthony Popyrin (Australia) Campbell Salmon	7^{7}	3	[8]
(India) Siddhant Banthia (Turkey) Kaya Göre	6^{4}	6	[11]
(Italy) Federico Iannaccone (Netherlands) Ien Schouten	7^{7}	2	[9]
(Finland) Emil Ruusuvuori (Czech Republic) Michael Vrbenský	6	4	[4]
6	(Belgium) Zizou Bergs (Israel) Yshai Oliel	2	6	[10]

Second round
1	(Japan) T Horie (China) Y Wu	6	6
(Republic of Ireland) S Carr (United Kingdom) M Stewart	4	4
(Netherlands) R Nijboer (New Zealand) A Rai	4	7	[7]
(Japan) S Hazawa (Russia) A Zakharov	6	5	[10]
(New Zealand) F Reynolds (Portugal) D Vale	6	7^{7}
(France) M Brovillé (Romania) VA Dancu	2	6^{2}
(India) S Banthia (Turkey) K Göre	6	7^{8}
6	(Belgium) Z Bergs (Israel) Y Oliel	3	6^{6}

Quarterfinals
1	(Japan) T Horie (China) Y Wu	6	6
(Japan) S Hazawa (Russia) A Zakharov	4	3
(New Zealand) F Reynolds (Portugal) D Vale	6	7
(India) S Banthia (Turkey) K Göre	2	5

Semifinals
1	(Japan) T Horie (China) Y Wu	6^{7}	6^{3}
(New Zealand) F Reynolds (Portugal) D Vale	7^{9}	7^{7}

=== Bottom half ===
First round
8	(United Kingdom) Finn Bass (United States) Trent Bryde	6	6
WC	(Australia) Alexander Crnokrak (Australia) Dane Sweeny	0	2
(Cyprus) Menelaos Efstathiou (Cyprus) Eleftherios Neos	7^{7}	7^{7}
(United States) Tristan Boyer (South Africa) Siphosothando Montsi	6^{5}	6^{3}
(South Africa) Joshua Howard-Tripp (Russia) Nikolay Vylegzhanin	3	1
(Australia) Kody Pearson (Australia) Adam Walton	6	6
(Philippines) Alberto Lim (United States) Alexandre Rotsaert	0	6	[8]
4	(Chinese Taipei) Hsu Yu-hsiou (China) Zhao Lingxi	6	2	[10]
5	(Australia) Alexei Popyrin (Poland) Kacper Żuk	7	6
(Italy) Francesco Forti (Italy) Mattia Frinzi	5	3
(United Kingdom) Jack Molloy (United Kingdom) Barnaby Smith	2	7^{7}	[11]
(Australia) Chase Ferguson (Australia) Benard Bruno Nkomba	6	6^{5}	[9]
(United States) Olukayode Ayeni (Australia) Moerani Bouzige	7	6
(Netherlands) Jesper de Jong (South Africa) Philip Henning	5	1
(Chinese Taipei) Tseng Chun-hsin (Chinese Taipei) Yin Bang-shuo	6	7
2	(Germany) Marvin Möller (Japan) Naoki Tajima	3	5

Second round
8	(United Kingdom) F Bass (United States) T Bryde	6	6
(Cyprus) M Efstathiou (Cyprus) E Neos	4	3
(Australia) K Pearson (Australia) A Walton	3	7^{8}	[0]
4	(Chinese Taipei) Y-h Hsu (China) L Zhao	6	6^{6}	[10]
5	(Australia) Al Popyrin (Poland) K Żuk	5	6	[13]
(United Kingdom) J Molloy (United Kingdom) B Smith	7	3	[11]
(United States) O Ayeni (Australia) M Bouzige	6	7
(Chinese Taipei) C-h Tseng (Chinese Taipei) B-s Yin	1	5

Quarterfinals
8	(United Kingdom) F Bass (United States) T Bryde	6	0	[2]
4	(Chinese Taipei) Y-h Hsu (China) L Zhao	3	6	[10]
5	(Australia) Al Popyrin (Poland) K Żuk	5	6	[11]
(United States) O Ayeni (Australia) M Bouzige	7	4	[9]

Semifinals
4	(Chinese Taipei) Y-h Hsu (China) L Zhao	6	6
5	(Australia) Al Popyrin (Poland) K Żuk	1	3
