= 2020 US Open – Wheelchair quad singles =

Wheelchair quad singles
- 2020 US Open

Final
- Champion: (Netherlands) Sam Schröder
- Runner-up: (Australia) Dylan Alcott
- Score: 7–6^{(7–5)}, 0–6, 6–4

Events
Singles	men	women		boys	girls
Doubles	men	women	mixed	boys	girls
WC Singles	men	women	quad
WC Doubles	men	women	quad
Legends	men	women	mixed
← 2019 ·	US Open	· 2021 →

Sam Schröder defeated Dylan Alcott in the final, 7–6^{(7–5)}, 0–6, 6–4 to win the quad singles wheelchair tennis title at the 2020 US Open. Schröder had entered the tournament as a wildcard.

Andy Lapthorne was the defending champion, but was eliminated in the round-robin stage.

== Seeds ==
1. (Australia) Dylan Alcott (final)
2. (United Kingdom) Andy Lapthorne (round robin)

== Draw ==
=== Key ===
- Q = Qualifier
- WC = Wild card
- LL = Lucky loser
- Alt = Alternate
- SE = Special exempt
- PR = Protected ranking
- ITF = ITF entry
- JE = Junior exempt
- w/o = Walkover
- r = Retired
- d = Defaulted
- SR = Special ranking

=== Final ===
Final
1	(Australia) Dylan Alcott	6^{5}	6	4
WC	(Netherlands) Sam Schröder	7^{7}	0	6

=== Round robin ===
		(Australia) Alcott	(United Kingdom) Lapthorne	(United States) Wagner	(Netherlands) Schröder	RR W–L	Set W–L	Game W–L	Standings
1	(Australia) Dylan Alcott		6–1, 7–6^{(7–4)}	6–1, 6–7^{(8–10)}, 6–0	6–2, 6–4	3–0	6–1 (86%)	43–21 (67%)	1
2	(United Kingdom) Andy Lapthorne	1–6, 6–7^{(4–7)}		6–2, 2–6, 6–4	2–6, 1–6	1–2	2–5 (29%)	24–37 (39%)	3
	(United States) David Wagner	1–6, 7–6^{(10–8)}, 0–6	2–6, 6–2, 4–6		5–7, 4–6	0–3	2–6 (25%)	29–45 (39%)	4
WC	(Netherlands) Sam Schröder	2–6, 4–6	6–2, 6–1	7–5, 6–4		2–1	4–2 (67%)	31–24 (56%)	2

Standings are determined by: 1. number of wins; 2. number of matches; 3. in two-players-ties, head-to-head records; 4. in three-players-ties, percentage of sets won, or of games won; 5. steering-committee decision.
