= 2017 Australian Open – Wheelchair women's singles =

Wheelchair women's singles
- 2017 Australian Open

Final
- Champion: (Japan) Yui Kamiji
- Runner-up: (Netherlands) Jiske Griffioen
- Score: 6–7^{(2–7)}, 6–3, 6–3

Events
Singles	men	women		boys	girls
Doubles	men	women	mixed	boys	girls
WC Singles	men	women	quad
WC Doubles	men	women	quad
Legends	men	women	mixed
- Australian Open

Yui Kamiji defeated the two-time defending champion Jiske Griffioen in the final, 6–7^{(2–7)}, 6–3, 6–3 to win the women's singles wheelchair tennis title at the 2017 Australian Open.

This marked the first major singles appearance of future 20-time major singles champion Diede de Groot; she lost in the quarterfinals to Sabine Ellerbrock.

== Seeds ==
1. (Netherlands) Jiske Griffioen (final)
2. (Japan) Yui Kamiji (champion)

== Draw ==
Key

- Q = Qualifier
- WC = Wild card
- LL = Lucky loser
- Alt = Alternate
- ITF = ITF entry
- PR = Protected ranking
- SR = Special ranking
- SE = Special exempt
- JE = Junior exempt
- JR = Junior Accelerator Programme entrant
- CO = College Accelerator Programme entrant
- NG = Next Gen Accelerator Program entrant
- w/o = Walkover
- r = Retired
- d = Defaulted

=== Draw ===
Quarterfinals
1	(Netherlands) Jiske Griffioen	6	6
(Netherlands) Aniek van Koot	4	3
(Netherlands) Diede de Groot	4	3
(Germany) Sabine Ellerbrock	6	6
(United Kingdom) Lucy Shuker	6	6
(Netherlands) Marjolein Buis	2	3
WC	(Germany) Katharina Krüger	1	2
2	(Japan) Yui Kamiji	6	6

Semifinals
1	(Netherlands) Jiske Griffioen	6	6
(Germany) Sabine Ellerbrock	2	1
(United Kingdom) Lucy Shuker	3	2
2	(Japan) Yui Kamiji	6	6

Final
1	(Netherlands) Jiske Griffioen	7^{7}	3	3
2	(Japan) Yui Kamiji	6^{2}	6	6
