= 2017 Australian Open – Mixed doubles =

Mixed doubles
- 2017 Australian Open

Final
- Champions: (United States) Abigail Spears (Colombia) Juan Sebastián Cabal
- Runners-up: (India) Sania Mirza (Croatia) Ivan Dodig
- Score: 6–2, 6–4

Details
- Draw: 32
- Seeds: 8

Events
Singles	men	women		boys	girls
Doubles	men	women	mixed	boys	girls
WC Singles	men	women	quad
WC Doubles	men	women	quad
Legends	men	women	mixed
- Australian Open

Elena Vesnina and Bruno Soares were the defending champions, but Vesnina chose not to participate this year. Soares played alongside Kateřina Siniaková, but the team withdrew before their second round match against Elina Svitolina and Chris Guccione.

Abigail Spears and Juan Sebastián Cabal won the title, beating Sania Mirza and Ivan Dodig in the final, 6–2, 6–4.

== Seeds ==
1. (United States) Bethanie Mattek-Sands / (United States) Mike Bryan (quarterfinals, withdrew)
2. (India) Sania Mirza / (Croatia) Ivan Dodig (final)
3. (Czech Republic) Andrea Hlaváčková / (France) Édouard Roger-Vasselin (first round)
4. (Chinese Taipei) Chan Hao-ching / (Belarus) Max Mirnyi (first round)

5. (Chinese Taipei) Chan Yung-jan / (Poland) Łukasz Kubot (second round)
6. (Czech Republic) Kateřina Siniaková / (Brazil) Bruno Soares (second round, withdrew)
7. (Czech Republic) Lucie Hradecká / (Czech Republic) Radek Štěpánek (first round)
8. (Czech Republic) Barbora Krejčíková / (United States) Rajeev Ram (first round)

== Draw ==
Key

- Q = Qualifier
- WC = Wild card
- LL = Lucky loser
- Alt = Alternate
- ITF = ITF entry
- PR = Protected ranking
- SR = Special ranking
- SE = Special exempt
- JE = Junior exempt
- JR = Junior Accelerator Programme entrant
- CO = College Accelerator Programme entrant
- NG = Next Gen Accelerator Program entrant
- w/o = Walkover
- r = Retired
- d = Defaulted

=== Finals ===
Semifinals
(Ukraine) Elina Svitolina (Australia) Chris Guccione	6^{1}	2
(United States) Abigail Spears (Colombia) Juan Sebastián Cabal	7^{7}	6
WC	(Australia) Samantha Stosur (Australia) Sam Groth	4	6	[5]
2	(India) Sania Mirza (Croatia) Ivan Dodig	6	2	[10]

Final
(United States) Abigail Spears (Colombia) Juan Sebastián Cabal	6	6
2	(India) Sania Mirza (Croatia) Ivan Dodig	2	4

=== Top half ===
First round
1	(United States) B Mattek-Sands (United States) M Bryan	6	4	[10]
WC	(Australia) Ar Rodionova (Australia) J-P Smith	4	6	[6]
(China) Y Xu (France) F Martin	6	6
(United States) L Huber (Poland) M Matkowski	2	3
(Ukraine) E Svitolina (Australia) C Guccione	6	6^{5}	[10]
(Germany) A-L Grönefeld (Colombia) R Farah	3	7^{7}	[7]
(Spain) MJ Martínez Sánchez (Uruguay) P Cuevas	4	3
6	(Czech Republic) K Siniaková (Brazil) B Soares	6	6
3	(Czech Republic) A Hlaváčková (France) É Roger-Vasselin	6	6^{6}	[8]
(United States) R Atawo (Sweden) R Lindstedt	0	7^{8}	[10]
(Slovenia) A Klepač (Philippines) T Huey	7^{8}	6^{5}	[8]
(Netherlands) M Krajicek (South Africa) R Klaasen	6^{6}	7^{7}	[10]
(Romania) I-C Begu (Romania) H Tecău	6	6
(United States) V King (Pakistan) A-u-H Qureshi	3	4
(United States) A Spears (Colombia) JS Cabal	6	7^{7}
7	(Czech Republic) L Hradecká (Czech Republic) R Štěpánek	4	6^{4}

Second round
1	(United States) B Mattek-Sands (United States) M Bryan	6	6
(China) Y Xu (France) F Martin	3	2
(Ukraine) E Svitolina (Australia) C Guccione	w/o
6	(Czech Republic) K Siniaková (Brazil) B Soares
(United States) R Atawo (Sweden) R Lindstedt	4	4
(Netherlands) M Krajicek (South Africa) R Klaasen	6	6
(Romania) I-C Begu (Romania) H Tecău	4	3
(United States) A Spears (Colombia) JS Cabal	6	6

Quarterfinals
1	(United States) B Mattek-Sands (United States) M Bryan
(Ukraine) E Svitolina (Australia) C Guccione	w/o
(Netherlands) M Krajicek (South Africa) R Klaasen	4	3
(United States) A Spears (Colombia) JS Cabal	6	6

Semifinals
(Ukraine) E Svitolina (Australia) C Guccione	6^{1}	2
(United States) A Spears (Colombia) JS Cabal	7^{7}	6

=== Bottom half ===
First round
8	(Czech Republic) B Krejčíková (United States) R Ram	7	6^{2}	[7]
WC	(Australia) C Dellacqua (Australia) M Reid	5	7^{7}	[10]
WC	(Australia) D Aiava (Australia) M Polmans	4	3
WC	(Switzerland) M Hingis (India) L Paes	6	6
WC	(Australia) S Stosur (Australia) S Groth	6	6
WC	(France) P Parmentier (France) N Mahut	3	4
(Croatia) D Jurak (Netherlands) J-J Rojer	6	6
4	(Chinese Taipei) H-c Chan (Belarus) M Mirnyi	4	2
5	(Chinese Taipei) Y-j Chan (Poland) Ł Kubot	6	7
WC	(Australia) D Gavrilova (Australia) L Saville	3	5
(Slovenia) K Srebotnik (New Zealand) M Venus	4	7^{7}	[7]
(Canada) G Dabrowski (India) R Bopanna	6	6^{5}	[10]
(China) S Zheng (Austria) A Peya	7^{7}	6
WC	(Australia) S Peers (Australia) J Peers	6^{3}	3
(Germany) L Siegemund (Croatia) M Pavić	5	4
2	(India) S Mirza (Croatia) I Dodig	7	6

Second round
WC	(Australia) C Dellacqua (Australia) M Reid	2	3
WC	(Switzerland) M Hingis (India) L Paes	6	6
WC	(Australia) S Stosur (Australia) S Groth	7^{8}	7
(Croatia) D Jurak (Netherlands) J-J Rojer	6^{6}	5
5	(Chinese Taipei) Y-j Chan (Poland) Ł Kubot	4	7	[3]
(Canada) G Dabrowski (India) R Bopanna	6	5	[10]
(China) S Zheng (Austria) A Peya	6	3	[6]
2	(India) S Mirza (Croatia) I Dodig	2	6	[10]

Quarterfinals
WC	(Switzerland) M Hingis (India) L Paes	3	2
WC	(Australia) S Stosur (Australia) S Groth	6	6
(Canada) G Dabrowski (India) R Bopanna	4	6	[10]
2	(India) S Mirza (Croatia) I Dodig	6	3	[12]

Semifinals
WC	(Australia) S Stosur (Australia) S Groth	4	6	[5]
2	(India) S Mirza (Croatia) I Dodig	6	2	[10]
