= 2017 Australian Open – Wheelchair men's singles =

Wheelchair men's singles
- 2017 Australian Open

Final
- Champion: (Argentina) Gustavo Fernández
- Runner-up: (France) Nicolas Peifer
- Score: 3–6, 6–2, 6–0

Events
Singles	men	women		boys	girls
Doubles	men	women	mixed	boys	girls
WC Singles	men	women	quad
WC Doubles	men	women	quad
Legends	men	women	mixed
- Australian Open

Gustavo Fernández defeated Nicolas Peifer in the final, 3–6, 6–2, 6–0 to win the men's singles wheelchair tennis title at the 2017 Australian Open. It was his first Australian Open singles title and second major singles title overall.

Gordon Reid was the defending champion, but was defeated in the quarterfinals by Joachim Gérard.

== Seeds ==
1. (United Kingdom) Gordon Reid (quarterfinals)
2. (France) Stéphane Houdet (semifinals)

== Draw ==
Key

- Q = Qualifier
- WC = Wild card
- LL = Lucky loser
- Alt = Alternate
- ITF = ITF entry
- PR = Protected ranking
- SR = Special ranking
- SE = Special exempt
- JE = Junior exempt
- JR = Junior Accelerator Programme entrant
- CO = College Accelerator Programme entrant
- NG = Next Gen Accelerator Program entrant
- w/o = Walkover
- r = Retired
- d = Defaulted

=== Draw ===
Quarterfinals
1	(United Kingdom) Gordon Reid	5	7	5
(Belgium) Joachim Gérard	7	5	7
Alt	(Netherlands) Maikel Scheffers	2	3
(France) Nicolas Peifer	6	6
(Argentina) Gustavo Fernández	6	6
WC	(Australia) Ben Weekes	2	2
(United Kingdom) Alfie Hewett	3	6	3
2	(France) Stéphane Houdet	6	3	6

Semifinals
(Belgium) Joachim Gérard	3	6^{4}
(France) Nicolas Peifer	6	7^{7}
(Argentina) Gustavo Fernández	6	7
2	(France) Stéphane Houdet	3	5

Final
(France) Nicolas Peifer	6	2	0
(Argentina) Gustavo Fernández	3	6	6
