= 2017 Australian Open – Wheelchair quad doubles =

Wheelchair quad doubles
- 2017 Australian Open

Final
- Champions: (United Kingdom) Andrew Lapthorne (United States) David Wagner
- Runners-up: (Australia) Dylan Alcott (Australia) Heath Davidson
- Score: 6–3, 6–3

Events
Singles	men	women		boys	girls
Doubles	men	women	mixed	boys	girls
WC Singles	men	women	quad
WC Doubles	men	women	quad
Legends	men	women	mixed
- Australian Open

Four-time defending champion David Wagner and his partner Andrew Lapthorne defeated Dylan Alcott and Heath Davidson in the final, 6–3, 6–3 to win the quad doubles wheelchair tennis title at the 2017 Australian Open.

Lucas Sithole and Wagner were the reigning champions, but Sithole did not participate this year, as he was ranked outside the world's top 3 and did not receive the event's wildcard.

== Seeds ==
1. (United Kingdom) Andrew Lapthorne / (United States) David Wagner (champions)
2. (Australia) Dylan Alcott / (Australia) Heath Davidson (final)

== Draw ==
Key

- Q = Qualifier
- WC = Wild card
- LL = Lucky loser
- Alt = Alternate
- ITF = ITF entry
- PR = Protected ranking
- SR = Special ranking
- SE = Special exempt
- JE = Junior exempt
- JR = Junior Accelerator Programme entrant
- CO = College Accelerator Programme entrant
- NG = Next Gen Accelerator Program entrant
- w/o = Walkover
- r = Retired
- d = Defaulted

Final
1	(United Kingdom) Andrew Lapthorne (United States) David Wagner	6	6
2	(Australia) Dylan Alcott (Australia) Heath Davidson	3	3
