= 2018 US Open – Wheelchair men's doubles =

Wheelchair men's doubles
- 2018 US Open

Final
- Champions: (United Kingdom) Alfie Hewett (United Kingdom) Gordon Reid
- Runners-up: (France) Stéphane Houdet (France) Nicolas Peifer
- Score: 5–7, 6–3, [11–9]

Events
Singles	men	women		boys	girls
Doubles	men	women	mixed	boys	girls
WC Singles	men	women	quad
WC Doubles	men	women	quad
Legends	men	women	mixed
← 2017 ·	US Open	· 2019 →

Defending champions Alfie Hewett and Gordon Reid defeated Stéphane Houdet and Nicolas Peifer in the final, 5–7, 6–3, [11–9] to win the men's doubles wheelchair tennis title at the 2018 US Open. Due to rain, the final was moved to Arthur Ashe Stadium, but it took place effectively behind closed doors, as all the spectators and TV crews had left.

== Seeds ==
1. (France) Stéphane Houdet / (France) Nicolas Peifer (final)
2. (United Kingdom) Alfie Hewett / (United Kingdom) Gordon Reid (champions)

== Draw ==
=== Key ===
- Q = Qualifier
- WC = Wild card
- LL = Lucky loser
- Alt = Alternate
- ITF = ITF entry
- PR = Protected ranking
- SR = Special ranking
- SE = Special exempt
- JE = Junior exempt
- JR = Junior Accelerator Programme entrant
- CO = College Accelerator Programme entrant
- NG = Next Gen Accelerator Program entrant
- w/o = Walkover
- r = Retired
- d = Defaulted

=== Bracket ===
Semifinals
1	(France) Stéphane Houdet (France) Nicolas Peifer	6	7^{7}
(Belgium) Joachim Gérard (Sweden) Stefan Olsson	1	6^{5}
(Argentina) Gustavo Fernández (Japan) Shingo Kunieda	5	6	[6]
2	(United Kingdom) Alfie Hewett (United Kingdom) Gordon Reid	7	4	[10]

Final
1	(France) Stéphane Houdet (France) Nicolas Peifer	7	3	[9]
2	(United Kingdom) Alfie Hewett (United Kingdom) Gordon Reid	5	6	[11]
