= 2017 Australian Open – Wheelchair women's doubles =

Wheelchair women's doubles
- 2017 Australian Open

Final
- Champions: (Netherlands) Jiske Griffioen (Netherlands) Aniek van Koot
- Runners-up: (Netherlands) Diede de Groot (Japan) Yui Kamiji
- Score: 6–3, 6–2

Events
Singles	men	women		boys	girls
Doubles	men	women	mixed	boys	girls
WC Singles	men	women	quad
WC Doubles	men	women	quad
Legends	men	women	mixed
← 2016 ·	Australian Open	· 2018 →

Jiske Griffioen and Aniek van Koot defeated the three-time defending champion Yui Kamiji and her partner Diede de Groot in the final, 6–3, 6–2 to win the women's doubles wheelchair tennis title at the 2017 Australian Open.

Marjolein Buis and Kamiji were the defending champions, but did not play together. Buis partnered Lucy Shuker, but was defeated in the semifinals by Griffioen and van Koot.

== Seeds ==
1. (Netherlands) Jiske Griffioen / (Netherlands) Aniek van Koot (champions)
2. (Netherlands) Diede de Groot / (Japan) Yui Kamiji (final)

== Draw ==
=== Key ===
- Q = Qualifier
- WC = Wild card
- LL = Lucky loser
- Alt = Alternate
- ITF = ITF entry
- PR = Protected ranking
- SR = Special ranking
- SE = Special exempt
- JE = Junior exempt
- JR = Junior Accelerator Programme entrant
- CO = College Accelerator Programme entrant
- NG = Next Gen Accelerator Program entrant
- w/o = Walkover
- r = Retired
- d = Defaulted

Semifinals
1	(Netherlands) Jiske Griffioen (Netherlands) Aniek van Koot	7	6
(Netherlands) Marjolein Buis (United Kingdom) Lucy Shuker	5	2
(Germany) Sabine Ellerbrock (Germany) Katharina Krüger	3	1
2	(Netherlands) Diede de Groot (Japan) Yui Kamiji	6	6

Final
1	(Netherlands) Jiske Griffioen (Netherlands) Aniek van Koot	6	6
2	(Netherlands) Diede de Groot (Japan) Yui Kamiji	3	2
