= 2020 US Open – Wheelchair men's singles =

Wheelchair men's singles
- 2020 US Open

Final
- Champion: (Japan) Shingo Kunieda
- Runner-up: (United Kingdom) Alfie Hewett
- Score: 6–3, 3–6, 7–6^{(7–3)}

Events
Singles	men	women		boys	girls
Doubles	men	women	mixed	boys	girls
WC Singles	men	women	quad
WC Doubles	men	women	quad
Legends	men	women	mixed
← 2019 ·	US Open	· 2021 →

Shingo Kunieda defeated the two-time defending champion Alfie Hewett in the final, 6–3, 3–6, 7–6^{(7–3)} to win the men's singles wheelchair tennis title at the 2020 US Open. It was his seventh US Open singles title and 24th major singles title overall.

== Seeds ==
1. (Japan) Shingo Kunieda (champion)
2. (Argentina) Gustavo Fernández (semifinals)

== Draw ==
=== Key ===
- Q = Qualifier
- WC = Wild card
- LL = Lucky loser
- Alt = Alternate
- ITF = ITF entry
- PR = Protected ranking
- SR = Special ranking
- SE = Special exempt
- JE = Junior exempt
- JR = Junior Accelerator Programme entrant
- CO = College Accelerator Programme entrant
- NG = Next Gen Accelerator Program entrant
- w/o = Walkover
- r = Retired
- d = Defaulted

=== Finals ===
Quarterfinals
1	(Japan) Shingo Kunieda	6	6
(France) Nicolas Peifer	3	2
WC	(United States) Casey Ratzlaff	6	3	0
(Belgium) Joachim Gérard	4	6	6
(United Kingdom) Alfie Hewett	6	6
(United Kingdom) Gordon Reid	0	2
(France) Stéphane Houdet	4	1
2	(Argentina) Gustavo Fernández	6	6

Semifinals
1	(Japan) Shingo Kunieda	4	6	6
(Belgium) Joachim Gérard	6	1	3
(United Kingdom) Alfie Hewett	6	1	6
2	(Argentina) Gustavo Fernández	4	6	3

Final
1	(Japan) Shingo Kunieda	6	3	7^{7}
(United Kingdom) Alfie Hewett	3	6	6^{3}
