= Koji Sugeno =

Japanese wheelchair tennis player

- Residence: Tokyo, Japan
- Born: 24 August 1981 (age 44) Ageo, Japan

Singles

Grand Slam singles results
- Australian Open: QF (2022)
- French Open: SF (2023)
- Wimbledon: QF (2022)
- US Open: QF (2022, 2023)

Doubles

Grand Slam doubles results
- Australian Open: SF (2022)
- French Open: SF (2022, 2023)
- Wimbledon: SF (2022)
- US Open: SF (2022)
Medal record
Men's wheelchair tennis
Representing Japan
Paralympic Games
Bronze medal – third place	2020 Tokyo	Quad doubles
Asian Para Games
Gold medal – first place	2022 Hangzhou	Quad singles
Gold medal – first place	2022 Hangzhou	Quad doubles

Koji Sugeno (Japanese: 菅野 浩二, born 24 August 1981) is a Japanese wheelchair tennis player. At the 2020 Summer Paralympics, he and Mitsuteru Moroishi won bronze medals for Japan in the quad doubles event. Sugeno also finished 4th in the quad singles event. He was born in Ageo and resides in Tokyo.
