= 2020 US Open – Wheelchair women's doubles =

Wheelchair women's doubles
- 2020 US Open

Final
- Champions: (Japan) Yui Kamiji (United Kingdom) Jordanne Whiley
- Runners-up: (Netherlands) Marjolein Buis (Netherlands) Diede de Groot
- Score: 6–3, 6–3

Events
Singles	men	women		boys	girls
Doubles	men	women	mixed	boys	girls
WC Singles	men	women	quad
WC Doubles	men	women	quad
Legends	men	women	mixed
← 2019 ·	US Open	· 2021 →

Yui Kamiji and Jordanne Whiley defeated the three-time defending champion Diede de Groot and her partner Marjolein Buis in the final, 6–3, 6–3 to win the women's doubles wheelchair tennis title at the 2020 US Open. With the win, Kamiji completed the triple career Grand Slam and Whiley completed the double career Grand Slam.

De Groot and Aniek van Koot were the reigning champions, but van Koot chose not to participate.

== Seeds ==
1. (Netherlands) Marjolein Buis / (Netherlands) Diede de Groot (final)
2. (Japan) Yui Kamiji / (United Kingdom) Jordanne Whiley (champions)

== Draw ==
=== Key ===
- Q = Qualifier
- WC = Wild card
- LL = Lucky loser
- Alt = Alternate
- ITF = ITF entry
- PR = Protected ranking
- SR = Special ranking
- SE = Special exempt
- JE = Junior exempt
- JR = Junior Accelerator Programme entrant
- CO = College Accelerator Programme entrant
- NG = Next Gen Accelerator Program entrant
- w/o = Walkover
- r = Retired
- d = Defaulted

=== Bracket ===
Semifinals
1	(Netherlands) Marjolein Buis (Netherlands) Diede de Groot	6	6
(Japan) Momoko Ohtani (United Kingdom) Lucy Shuker	0	1
(Colombia) Angélica Bernal (United States) Dana Mathewson	2	1
2	(Japan) Yui Kamiji (United Kingdom) Jordanne Whiley	6	6

Final
1	(Netherlands) Marjolein Buis (Netherlands) Diede de Groot	3	3
2	(Japan) Yui Kamiji (United Kingdom) Jordanne Whiley	6	6
