= 2020 US Open – Wheelchair quad doubles =

Wheelchair quad doubles
- 2020 US Open

Final
- Champions: (Australia) Dylan Alcott (United Kingdom) Andy Lapthorne
- Runners-up: (Netherlands) Sam Schröder (United States) David Wagner
- Score: 3–6, 6–4, [10–8]

Events
Singles	men	women		boys	girls
Doubles	men	women	mixed	boys	girls
WC Singles	men	women	quad
WC Doubles	men	women	quad
Legends	men	women	mixed
← 2019 ·	US Open	· 2021 →

Defending champions Dylan Alcott and Andy Lapthorne defeated Sam Schröder and David Wagner in the final, 3–6, 6–4, [10–8] to win the quad doubles wheelchair tennis title at the 2020 US Open.

== Draw ==
=== Key ===
- Q = Qualifier
- WC = Wild card
- LL = Lucky loser
- Alt = Alternate
- SE = Special exempt
- PR = Protected ranking
- ITF = ITF entry
- JE = Junior exempt
- w/o = Walkover
- r = Retired
- d = Defaulted
- SR = Special ranking

=== Bracket ===
Final
(Australia) Dylan Alcott (United Kingdom) Andy Lapthorne	3	6	[10]
(Netherlands) Sam Schröder (United States) David Wagner	6	4	[8]
