= 2017 Australian Open – Girls' doubles =

Girls' doubles
- 2017 Australian Open

Final
- Champions: (Canada) Bianca Andreescu (United States) Carson Branstine
- Runners-up: (Poland) Maja Chwalińska (Poland) Iga Świątek
- Score: 6–1, 7–6^{(7–4)}

Events
Singles	men	women		boys	girls
Doubles	men	women	mixed	boys	girls
WC Singles	men	women	quad
WC Doubles	men	women	quad
Legends	men	women	mixed
- Australian Open

Anna Kalinskaya and Tereza Mihalíková were the defending champions, but both players were ineligible to participate.

Bianca Andreescu and Carson Branstine won the title, defeating Maja Chwalińska and Iga Świątek in the final, 6–1, 7–6^{(7–4)}.

== Seeds ==
1. (United Kingdom) Emily Appleton / (United Kingdom) Jodie Anna Burrage (quarterfinals)
2. (Serbia) Olga Danilović / (Ukraine) Marta Kostyuk (second round)
3. (Canada) Bianca Andreescu / (United States) Carson Branstine (champions)
4. (Chinese Taipei) Lee Yang / (Switzerland) Rebeka Masarova (second round)
5. (United States) Caty McNally / (United States) Natasha Subhash (semifinals)
6. (Australia) Baijing Lin / (China) Wang Xiyu (first round)
7. (Chinese Taipei) Cho I-hsuan / (Japan) Yuki Naito (second round)
8. (Croatia) Lea Bošković / (Russia) Elena Rybakina (first round)

== Draw ==
Key

- Q = Qualifier
- WC = Wild card
- LL = Lucky loser
- Alt = Alternate
- ITF = ITF entry
- PR = Protected ranking
- SR = Special ranking
- SE = Special exempt
- JE = Junior exempt
- JR = Junior Accelerator Programme entrant
- CO = College Accelerator Programme entrant
- NG = Next Gen Accelerator Program entrant
- w/o = Walkover
- r = Retired
- d = Defaulted

=== Finals ===
Semifinals
5	(United States) Caty McNally (United States) Natasha Subhash	4	6	[7]
3	(Canada) Bianca Andreescu (United States) Carson Branstine	6	4	[10]
(Poland) Maja Chwalińska (Poland) Iga Świątek	6	6
(Japan) Anri Nagata (Thailand) Thasaporn Naklo	2	1

Final
3	(Canada) Bianca Andreescu (United States) Carson Branstine	6	7^{7}
(Poland) Maja Chwalińska (Poland) Iga Świątek	1	6^{4}

=== Top half ===
First round
1	(United Kingdom) Emily Appleton (United Kingdom) Jodie Anna Burrage	6	6
(India) Nidhi Surapaneni (Russia) Ekaterina Vishnevskaya	3	3
WC	(Australia) Annerly Poulos (Australia) Tayla Whitehouse	3	7^{7}	[9]
(Ukraine) Oleksandra Andrieieva (Russia) Sofya Lansere	6	6^{2}	[11]
(India) Mahak Jain (Netherlands) Lexie Stevens	6^{7}	4
(Czech Republic) Denisa Hindová (Czech Republic) Johana Marková	7^{9}	6
(Chinese Taipei) Liang En-shuo (China) Wang Xinyu	6^{5}	6^{7}
5	(United States) Caty McNally (United States) Natasha Subhash	7^{7}	7^{9}
3	(Canada) Bianca Andreescu (United States) Carson Branstine	6	6
WC	(Australia) Aleksa Cveticanin (Australia) Seone Mendez	3	1
(South Africa) Zoë Kruger (Japan) Himari Sato	4	1
(Chinese Taipei) Chen Pei-hsuan (Japan) Naho Sato	6	6
(China) Ma Shuyue (India) Mihika Yadav	3	1
(Italy) Federica Bilardo (Italy) Tatiana Pieri	6	6
(United Kingdom) Ali Collins (Germany) Jule Niemeier	6	6
8	(Croatia) Lea Bošković (Russia) Elena Rybakina	4	2

Second round
1	(United Kingdom) E Appleton (United Kingdom) JA Burrage	6	6
(Ukraine) O Andrieieva (Russia) S Lansere	4	4
(Czech Republic) D Hindová (Czech Republic) J Marková	3	4
5	(United States) C McNally (United States) N Subhash	6	6
3	(Canada) B Andreescu (United States) C Branstine	4	6	[10]
(Chinese Taipei) P-h Chen (Japan) N Sato	6	2	[7]
(Italy) F Bilardo (Italy) T Pieri	3	2
(United Kingdom) A Collins (Germany) J Niemeier	6	6

Quarterfinals
1	(United Kingdom) E Appleton (United Kingdom) JA Burrage	4	3
5	(United States) C McNally (United States) N Subhash	6	6
3	(Canada) B Andreescu (United States) C Branstine	6	1	[10]
(United Kingdom) A Collins (Germany) J Niemeier	4	6	[3]

Semifinals
5	(United States) C McNally (United States) N Subhash	4	6	[7]
3	(Canada) B Andreescu (United States) C Branstine	6	4	[10]

=== Bottom half ===
First round
7	(Chinese Taipei) Cho I-hsuan (Japan) Yuki Naito	6	6
WC	(Papua New Guinea) Patricia Apisah (Australia) Amber Marshall	3	2
(Poland) Maja Chwalińska (Poland) Iga Świątek	6	6
WC	(Australia) Lisa Mays (Australia) Ivana Popovic	2	2
(United States) Taylor Johnson (United States) Nicole Mossmer	6	7^{11}
(South Korea) Lee Eun-hye (Japan) Satoko Sueno	2	6^{9}
(Papua New Guinea) Violet Apisah (India) Zeel Desai	4	4
4	(Chinese Taipei) Lee Yang (Switzerland) Rebeka Masarova	6	6
6	(Australia) Baijing Lin (China) Wang Xiyu	1	5
(Norway) Astrid Brune Olsen (Norway) Malene Helgø	6	7
(United States) Hurricane Tyra Black (United States) Jimena Rodriguez-Benito	6^{6}	7^{7}	[10]
(Romania) Mihaela Lorena Marculescu (Japan) Ayumi Miyamoto	7^{8}	6^{4}	[7]
Alt	(Chinese Taipei) Cho Yi-tsen (Chinese Taipei) Joanna Garland	3	5
(Japan) Anri Nagata (Thailand) Thasaporn Naklo	6	7
(Australia) Gabriella Da Silva-Fick (Australia) Kaitlin Staines	4	2
2	(Serbia) Olga Danilović (Ukraine) Marta Kostyuk	6	6

Second round
7	(Chinese Taipei) I-h Cho (Japan) Y Naito	3	4
(Poland) M Chwalińska (Poland) I Świątek	6	6
(United States) T Johnson (United States) N Mossmer	7^{7}	6
4	(Chinese Taipei) Y Lee (Switzerland) R Masarova	6^{4}	1
(Norway) A Brune Olsen (Norway) M Helgø	6	6
(United States) HT Black (United States) J Rodriguez-Benito	0	4
(Japan) A Nagata (Thailand) T Naklo	1	6	[10]
2	(Serbia) O Danilović (Ukraine) M Kostyuk	6	4	[8]

Quarterfinals
(Poland) M Chwalińska (Poland) I Świątek	6	7
(United States) T Johnson (United States) N Mossmer	2	5
(Norway) A Brune Olsen (Norway) M Helgø	3	4
(Japan) A Nagata (Thailand) T Naklo	6	6

Semifinals
(Poland) M Chwalińska (Poland) I Świątek	6	6
(Japan) A Nagata (Thailand) T Naklo	2	1
