= 2017 Australian Open – Wheelchair men's doubles =

Wheelchair men's doubles
- 2017 Australian Open

Final
- Champions: (Belgium) Joachim Gérard (United Kingdom) Gordon Reid
- Runners-up: (Argentina) Gustavo Fernández (United Kingdom) Alfie Hewett
- Score: 6–3, 3–6, [10–3]

Events
| Singles | men | women | | boys | girls |
| Doubles | men | women | mixed | boys | girls |
| WC Singles | men | women | quad |
| WC Doubles | men | women | quad |
| Legends | men | women | mixed |
| ← 2016 · | Australian Open | · 2018 → |

Joachim Gérard and Gordon Reid defeated Gustavo Fernández and Alfie Hewett in the final, 6–3, 3–6, [10–3] to win the men's doubles wheelchair tennis title at the 2017 Australian Open. With the win, Reid completed the career Grand Slam.

Stéphane Houdet and Nicolas Peifer were the defending champions, but were defeated by Fernández and Hewett in the semifinals.

== Seeds ==
1. (France) Stéphane Houdet / (France) Nicolas Peifer (semifinals)
2. (Belgium) Joachim Gérard / (United Kingdom) Gordon Reid (champions)

== Draw ==
=== Key ===
- Q = Qualifier
- WC = Wild card
- LL = Lucky loser
- Alt = Alternate
- ITF = ITF entry
- PR = Protected ranking
- SR = Special ranking
- SE = Special exempt
- JE = Junior exempt
- JR = Junior Accelerator Programme entrant
- CO = College Accelerator Programme entrant
- NG = Next Gen Accelerator Program entrant
- w/o = Walkover
- r = Retired
- d = Defaulted

=== Draw ===
Semifinals
1 | (France) Stéphane Houdet (France) Nicolas Peifer | 6 | 1 | [7]
(Argentina) Gustavo Fernández (United Kingdom) Alfie Hewett | 1 | 6 | [10]
(Netherlands) Maikel Scheffers (Australia) Ben Weekes | 0 | 1
2 | (Belgium) Joachim Gérard (United Kingdom) Gordon Reid | 6 | 6

Final
(Argentina) Gustavo Fernández (United Kingdom) Alfie Hewett | 3 | 6 | [3]
2 | (Belgium) Joachim Gérard (United Kingdom) Gordon Reid | 6 | 3 | [10]
