= 2017 Australian Open – Wheelchair quad singles =

Wheelchair quad singles
- 2017 Australian Open

Final
- Champion: (Australia) Dylan Alcott
- Runner-up: (United Kingdom) Andrew Lapthorne
- Score: 6–2, 6–2

Events
Singles	men	women		boys	girls
Doubles	men	women	mixed	boys	girls
WC Singles	men	women	quad
WC Doubles	men	women	quad
Legends	men	women	mixed
- Australian Open

Two-time defending champion Dylan Alcott defeated Andrew Lapthorne in the final, 6–2, 6–2 to win the quad singles wheelchair tennis title at the 2017 Australian Open.

== Draw ==
Key

- Q = Qualifier
- WC = Wild card
- LL = Lucky loser
- Alt = Alternate
- ITF = ITF entry
- PR = Protected ranking
- SR = Special ranking
- SE = Special exempt
- JE = Junior exempt
- JR = Junior Accelerator Programme entrant
- CO = College Accelerator Programme entrant
- NG = Next Gen Accelerator Program entrant
- w/o = Walkover
- r = Retired
- d = Defaulted

=== Final ===
Final
1	(Australia) Dylan Alcott	6	6
	(United Kingdom) Andrew Lapthorne	2	2

=== Round robin ===
		(Australia) Alcott	(Australia) Davidson	(United Kingdom) Lapthorne	(United States) Wagner	RR; W–L	Set; W–L	Game; W–L	Standings
1	(Australia) Dylan Alcott		6–1, 6–4	6–4, 6–1	6–1, 7–5	3–0	6–0	37–16	1
WC	(Australia) Heath Davidson	1–6, 4–6		w/d	4–6, 2–6	0–3	0–4	11–24	4
	(United Kingdom) Andrew Lapthorne	4–6, 1–6	w/o		6–3, 6–3	2–1	2–2	17–18	2
2	(United States) David Wagner	1–6, 5–7	6–4, 6–2	3–6, 3–6		1–2	2–4	24–31	3

Standings are determined by: 1. number of wins; 2. number of matches; 3. in two-players-ties, head-to-head records; 4. in three-players-ties, percentage of sets won, or of games won; 5. steering-committee decision.
