= 2020 US Open – Wheelchair women's singles =

Wheelchair women's singles
- 2020 US Open

Final
- Champion: (Netherlands) Diede de Groot
- Runner-up: (Japan) Yui Kamiji
- Score: 6–3, 6–3

Events
Singles	men	women		boys	girls
Doubles	men	women	mixed	boys	girls
WC Singles	men	women	quad
WC Doubles	men	women	quad
Legends	men	women	mixed
← 2019 ·	US Open	· 2021 →

Two-time defending champion Diede de Groot defeated Yui Kamiji in the final, 6–3, 6–3 to win the women's singles wheelchair tennis title at the 2020 US Open.

== Seeds ==
1. (Netherlands) Diede de Groot (champion)
2. (Japan) Yui Kamiji (final)

== Draw ==
=== Key ===
- Q = Qualifier
- WC = Wild card
- LL = Lucky loser
- Alt = Alternate
- ITF = ITF entry
- PR = Protected ranking
- SR = Special ranking
- SE = Special exempt
- JE = Junior exempt
- JR = Junior Accelerator Programme entrant
- CO = College Accelerator Programme entrant
- NG = Next Gen Accelerator Program entrant
- w/o = Walkover
- r = Retired
- d = Defaulted

=== Finals ===
Quarterfinals
1	(Netherlands) Diede de Groot	6	6
(United Kingdom) Jordanne Whiley	3	4
(Netherlands) Marjolein Buis	6	6
(United States) Dana Mathewson	2	1
(Colombia) Angélica Bernal	4	6	6
WC	(United Kingdom) Lucy Shuker	6	3	3
(Japan) Momoko Ohtani	2	6^{5}
2	(Japan) Yui Kamiji	6	7^{7}

Semifinals
1	(Netherlands) Diede de Groot	7^{10}	4	6
(Netherlands) Marjolein Buis	6^{8}	6	1
(Colombia) Angélica Bernal	2	1
2	(Japan) Yui Kamiji	6	6

Final
1	(Netherlands) Diede de Groot	6	6
2	(Japan) Yui Kamiji	3	3
