= Bryan Barten =

American wheelchair tennis player

- Country (sports): United States
- Residence: Tucson, Arizona
- Born: October 8, 1973 (age 51); Hart, Michigan, U.S.
- Turned pro: 2000
- Plays: Right-handed (one-handed backhand)

Singles
- Career titles: 33
- Highest ranking: No. 5 (26 June 2006)
- Current ranking: No. 11 (7 June 2021)

Grand Slam singles results
- US Open: QF (2021)

Other tournaments
- Paralympic Games: QF (2012)

Doubles
- Career titles: 45
- Highest ranking: No. 4 (10 April 2017)
- Current ranking: No. 11 (7 June 2021)

Grand Slam doubles results
- US Open: F (2017, 2018, 2019)
Medal record
Parapan American Games
Bronze medal – third place	2019 Lima	Quads singles

Bryan Barten (born October 8, 1973) is an American wheelchair tennis player, he is a three time US Open quads doubles finalist with Dylan Alcott and David Wagner. He has also competed at the Paralympic Games twice, reaching the quarterfinals at the 2012 Summer Paralympics in the quads singles.
