= Benefit (sports) =

Sports match or activity

A benefit is a match or season of activities granted by a sporting body to a loyal sportsman to boost their income before retirement. Often this is in the form of a match for which all the ticket proceeds are given to the player in question. However hosting one of these matches is a risk for the player in question as they are responsible for paying any relevant receipts and collects any excess income from the match, therefore income from such matches is more often than not reliant on attendance.

Sometimes, the "beneficiary" can opt to give part or all of the money to charity. An example of this is Paul Collingwood's 2007 benefit with Durham County Cricket Club. This may also occur when sportsmen unite for a cause, for example the Rafael Nadal vs Roger Federer "Match for Africa" (2010) where more than $2.6 million was raised for the Roger Federer Foundation, enabling children living in poverty to realise their potential.

== History ==
Benefit matches originated in English county cricket in a time period where playing sport, in particular cricket, for a living didn't offer as big of an income as it does in modern society (2015), holding a benefit at a player's 10 year service mark or retirement mark was considered a form of retirement/insurance policy. Benefit matches are confused with Testimonial matches, it's important to note that this is a direct gift from the club where income is guaranteed unlike in a benefit where income is often dependent on attendance. Similar events were organised in Baseball in the 1860s, these events often occurred at season end involving the stars of the sport to acknowledge a significant member of the sport. However a rule established by the NABBP in 1859 prohibited any player compensation, the basis of this rule was to maintain fair game in competition and avoid professional vs. amateur situations arising.

== Significant matches ==
=== Baseball ===
- 1861, Creighton & Pierce
- 1911, Addie Joss Benefit Game

=== Ice Hockey ===
- 1934, Ace Bailey Benefit Game

== See also ==
- Testimonial Match
- Benefit Season
