= Federer–Nadal rivalry =

Modern-day tennis rivalry

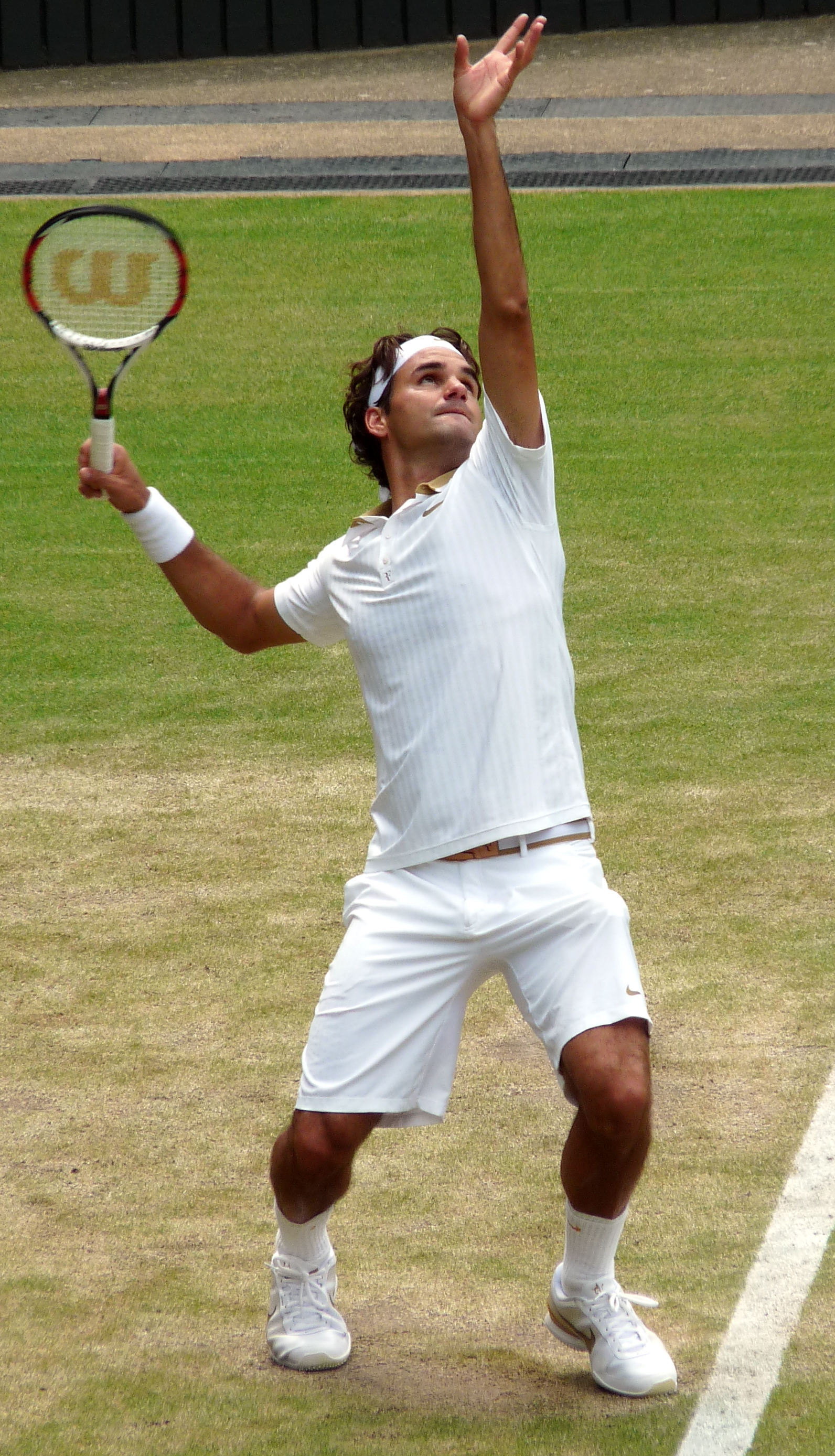
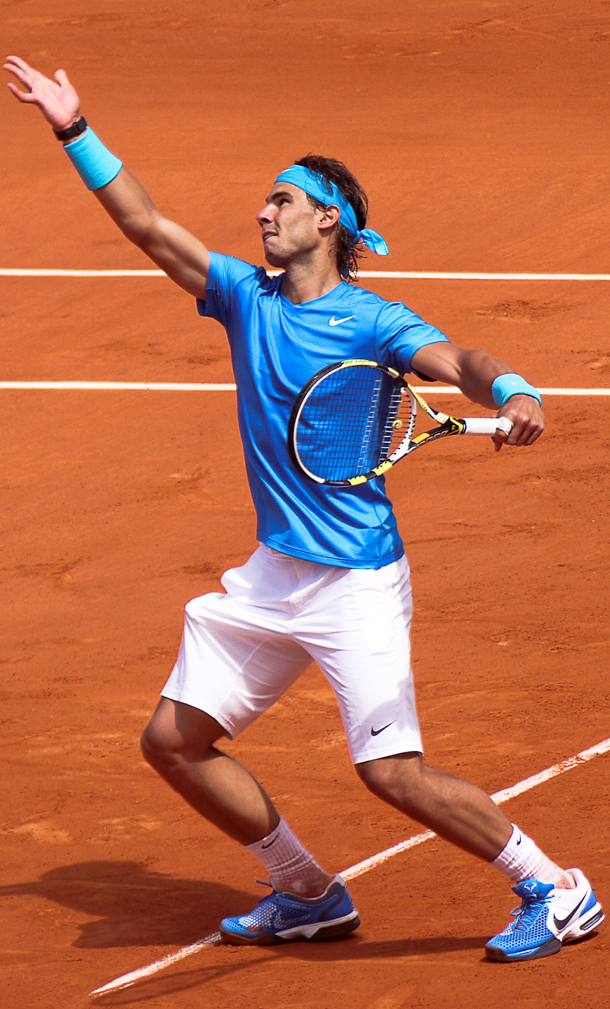
Roger Federer and Rafael Nadal on their respective favourite surfaces, grass and clay

The tennis rivalry between Roger Federer and Rafael Nadal is considered one of the greatest in the history of sport. Federer and Nadal played each other 40 times, with Nadal leading 24–16 overall, including 14–10 in finals.

Of their 40 matches, 20 were on hardcourts, 16 on clay, and 4 on grass. Nadal leads on clay (14–2), while Federer leads on grass (3–1) and hard court (11–9). A total of 14 matches were at the majors, with Nadal leading 10–4. Nadal leads 6–0 at the French Open and 3–1 at the Australian Open, while Federer leads 3–1 at Wimbledon. On several occasions, they were a match away from meeting at the US Open, but were denied each time. (Note: Nadal lost to Andy Murray in the 2008 semifinals and Juan Martín del Potro in the 2009 semifinals; Federer lost to Novak Djokovic in the 2010 and 2011 semifinals, to Tommy Robredo in the 2013 fourth round and to del Potro in the 2017 quarterfinals.) They are tied in five-set encounters at 3–3. Nadal outplayed Federer for most of their rivalry, winning 23 of their first 33 matches from 2004–2014. However, Federer outplayed Nadal during the final stretch from 2015–2019, winning 6 of their last 7 matches.

Nadal ranks second and Federer ranks third on the men's all-time list for the most major singles titles, with 22 and 20 titles respectively. Their rival Novak Djokovic ranks first with 24 titles. The pair hold numerous other records between them. During a stretch of 23 majors from the 2005 French Open to the 2010 US Open, the pair won all but two of these events, including eleven consecutively. They won a further six consecutive majors between the 2017 Australian Open to the 2018 French Open. They are the only pair of men to have finished six consecutive calendar years as the top two ranked players on the ATP Tour, which they did from 2005 to 2010, and for a seventh time in 2017. This includes a record 211 consecutive weeks sharing the top two rankings from July 2005 to August 2009.

As tournament seedings are based on rankings, with the top two seeds placed on opposite sides of the draw, 24 of Nadal and Federer's 40 matches were in tournament finals, including a shared all-time record nine major finals (equalled only by Nadal and Novak Djokovic) and 12 Masters finals. Another ten were semifinals with only three taking place before the quarterfinal stage.

From 2006 to 2008, they contested every French Open and Wimbledon final. Their 2008 Wimbledon final was lauded as the greatest match ever by many long-time tennis analysts. (Note: See) Their 2017 Australian Open final was one of the most highly anticipated matches in tennis history, in part due to the relevance within popular discussions on their placement in greatest-of-all-time listings, coupled with the fact that they were both already in their 30s. (Note: See) Other matches considered particularly notable include the 2005 Miami Open final, 2006 Italian Open final, 2007 Wimbledon final, and 2009 Australian Open final, all of which went to five sets.

Their first match was at the 2004 Miami Open, which Nadal won in straight sets. Their last match was in the semifinals of the 2019 Wimbledon Championships, which Federer won in four sets.

== History ==
=== 2004: Miami ===
Federer and Nadal played their first match in March 2004 at the third round of the Miami Masters. Nadal, only 17 years old and ranked No. 34, surprised many by beating the then No. 1 in straight sets.

=== 2005: Miami, French Open ===
In 2005, Federer and Nadal played each other twice and each won one.

Their second meeting was again in Miami, but this time in the best-of-five-sets final. Federer recovered from a two-set deficit and a break down in the third set to win in five sets.

They played again two months later in the semifinals of the French Open, which was their first match on clay. Nadal defeated Federer in four sets en route to his first major title. By the end of 2005, Nadal led their head-to-head record at 2–1.

=== 2006: Dubai, Monte Carlo, Rome, French Open, Wimbledon, Masters Cup ===
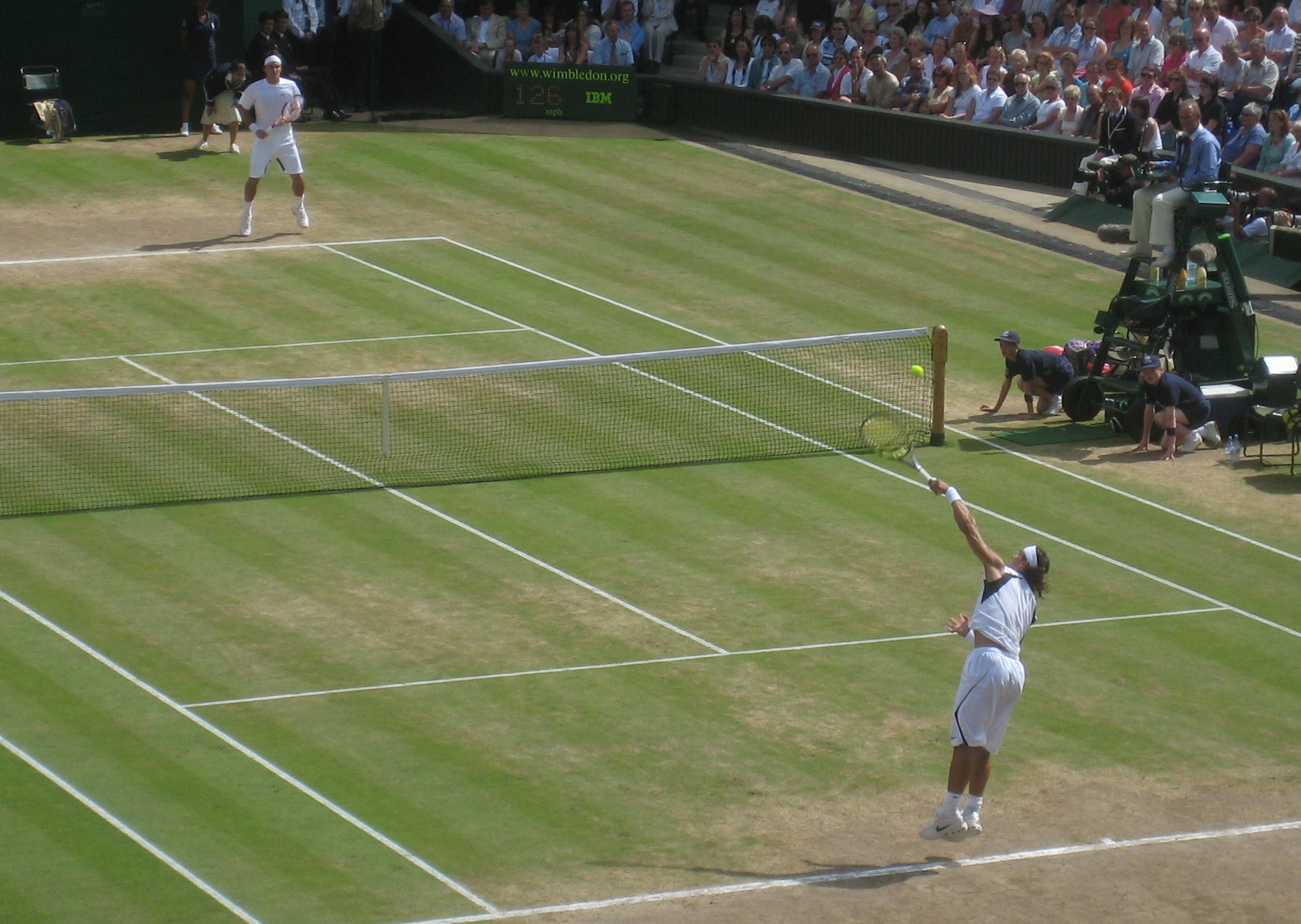
Nadal serves to Federer during the 2006 Wimbledon final.

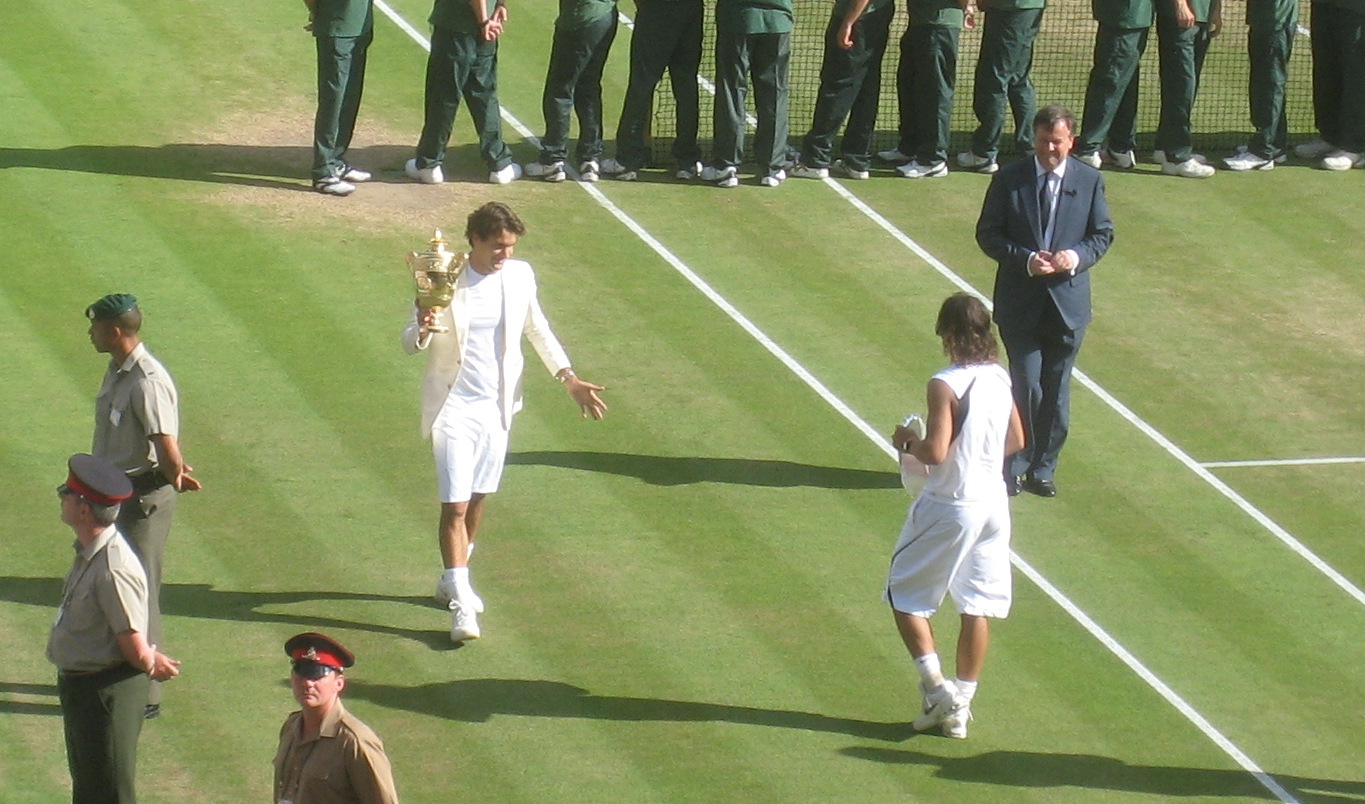
Federer celebrates his eighth Grand Slam title after a win over Nadal.

In 2006, Nadal and Federer faced each other in six matches.

Nadal won the first four, beginning with the Dubai final in February played on hard court. This was Federer's first loss of the year and ended his Open Era record of 56 consecutive wins on hard courts.

The clay season ensued, and Nadal continued his dominance on clay, defeating Federer in the finals of the Monte Carlo Masters, the Rome Masters, and the French Open, in their first major final. Federer won the first set quickly, but Nadal fought back and took the next three sets to capture his second French Open title. In the Rome final, Federer held two championship points on Nadal's serve at 5–6 in the fifth set, but failed to convert. Federer then led 5–3 in the fifth-set tiebreaker, but Nadal won the next four points to claim the title. At five hours and five minutes, this is the longest match Federer and Nadal have ever contested.

They faced off again a month later in the final of Wimbledon, which was their first meeting on grass. Federer won in four sets to capture his fourth consecutive Wimbledon title with two sets going to tiebreakers.

They did not meet again until the semifinals of the year-end Masters Cup. Federer won in straight sets, en route to his third Masters Cup title in four years. At year's end, Nadal's career head-to-head advantage had risen to 6–3.

=== 2007: Monte Carlo, Hamburg, French Open, Wimbledon, Masters Cup ===
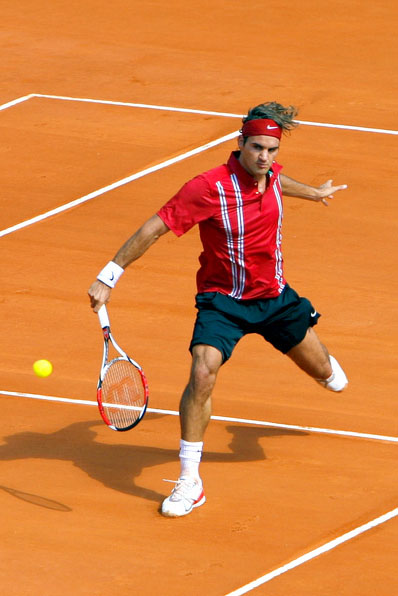
Federer in the finals of Monte Carlo 2007.

Nadal and Federer faced each other five times in 2007, and Federer won three of their matches.

For the second straight year, Federer and Nadal played in three finals on clay. Nadal won the first meeting in straight sets, winning his third consecutive Monte Carlo title. A few weeks later they met at the Hamburg Masters, where Federer defeated Nadal for the first time on clay, ending Nadal's Open Era record 81-match winning streak on clay.

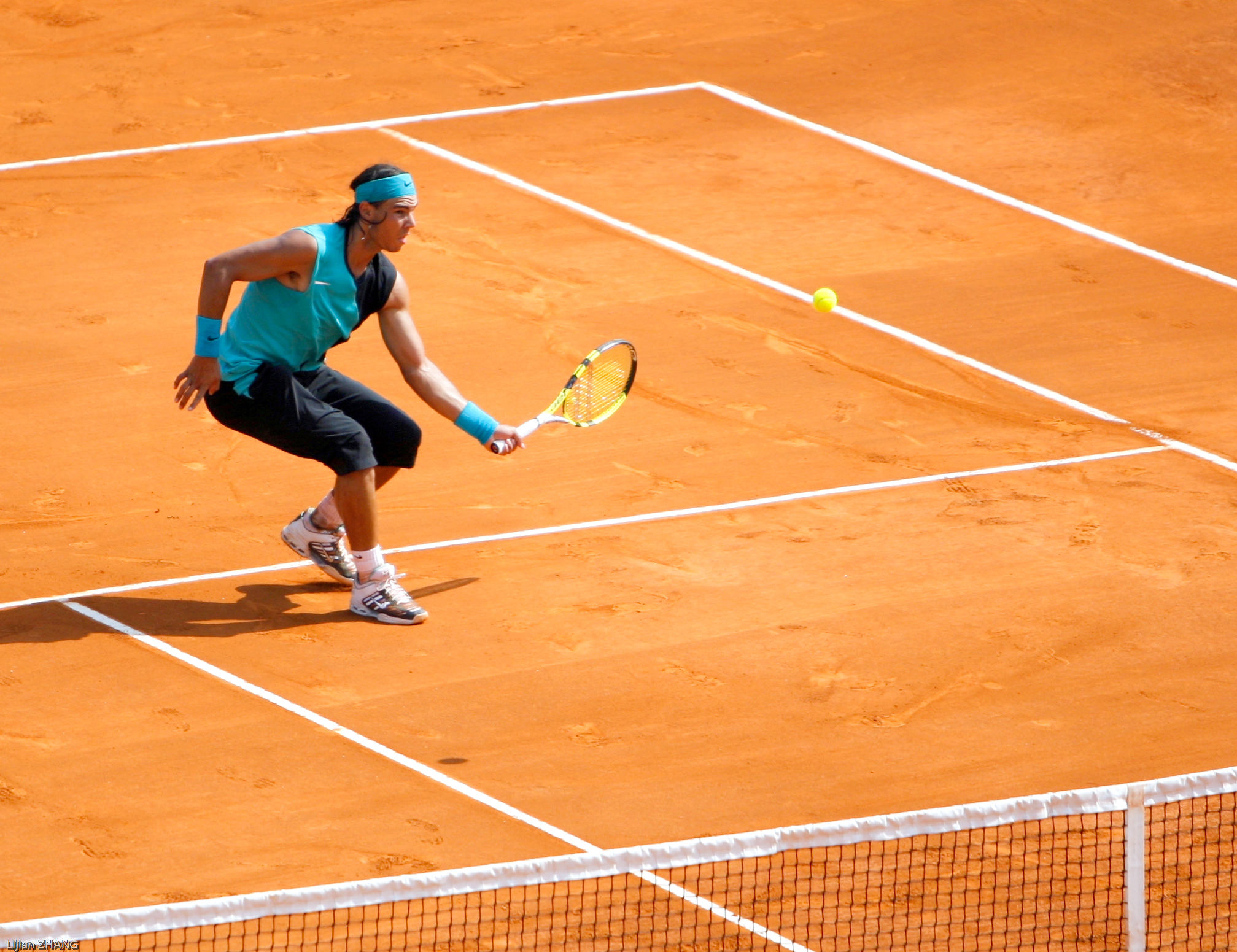
Nadal in the finals of Monte Carlo 2007.

Their next encounter was the French Open final, and Nadal won their much-anticipated rematch in four sets, capturing his third consecutive French Open title.

Their last two meetings in 2007 were also a repeat of 2006: the final of Wimbledon and the semifinal of the Masters Cup. Once again, Federer won both matches, though their Wimbledon final lasted five sets, in a match which was almost universally praised as the greatest Wimbledon final since Borg–McEnroe in 1980.

At the end of the year, on the other hand, their Masters Cup match was the shortest match of their rivalry, lasting less than an hour. By the end of the year Federer narrowed his head-to-head deficit, with the record standing at 8–6 in Nadal's favour.

=== 2008: Monte Carlo, Hamburg, French Open, Wimbledon ===
Federer and Nadal played four times in 2008, and Nadal won all four times, extending his career advantage to 12–6.

For the third straight year, they played in three finals during the clay-court season. Nadal defeated Federer in Monte Carlo for the third straight year, capturing his Open-Era-record fourth consecutive title there. A few weeks later Nadal avenged his only clay-court loss to Federer by defeating him in three sets for his first Hamburg Masters title. Federer had double-break leads in the first sets of both Monte Carlo and Hamburg, but could not close out the sets.

Also for the third straight year, they played in the final of the French Open. Nadal won his fourth consecutive French Open title, by a score of 6–1, 6–3, 6–0. The scoreline puts the match among the most one-sided in Grand Slam finals history.

Nadal and Federer also met in the final of Wimbledon for the third straight year, in the most anticipated match of their rivalry. Amidst rain delays, they played what was then the longest final in Wimbledon history (4 hours and 48 minutes), and Nadal captured the title, winning a fifth set that finished in near darkness. This match broke Federer's Open-Era-record 65-match winning streak on grass, which had spanned more than five years.

=== 2009: Australian Open, Madrid ===
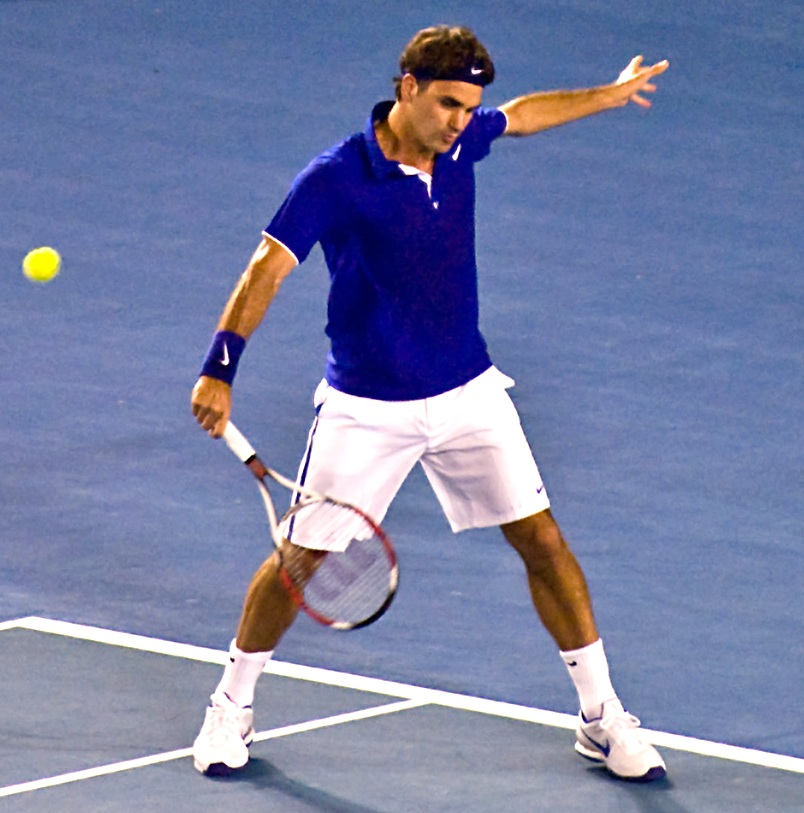
Federer in the finals of Australian Open 2009.

Federer and Nadal played each other only twice in 2009, splitting their matches.

Both players began the year strong, reaching the final of the Australian Open. This was the first hard-court Major final for Nadal, but Federer was undefeated in eight hard-court Major finals (five US Open, three Australian). The final was long (4 hours and 23 minutes) and competitive in the first four sets, with Nadal pulling away decisively in the fifth set to secure his first hard-court championship.

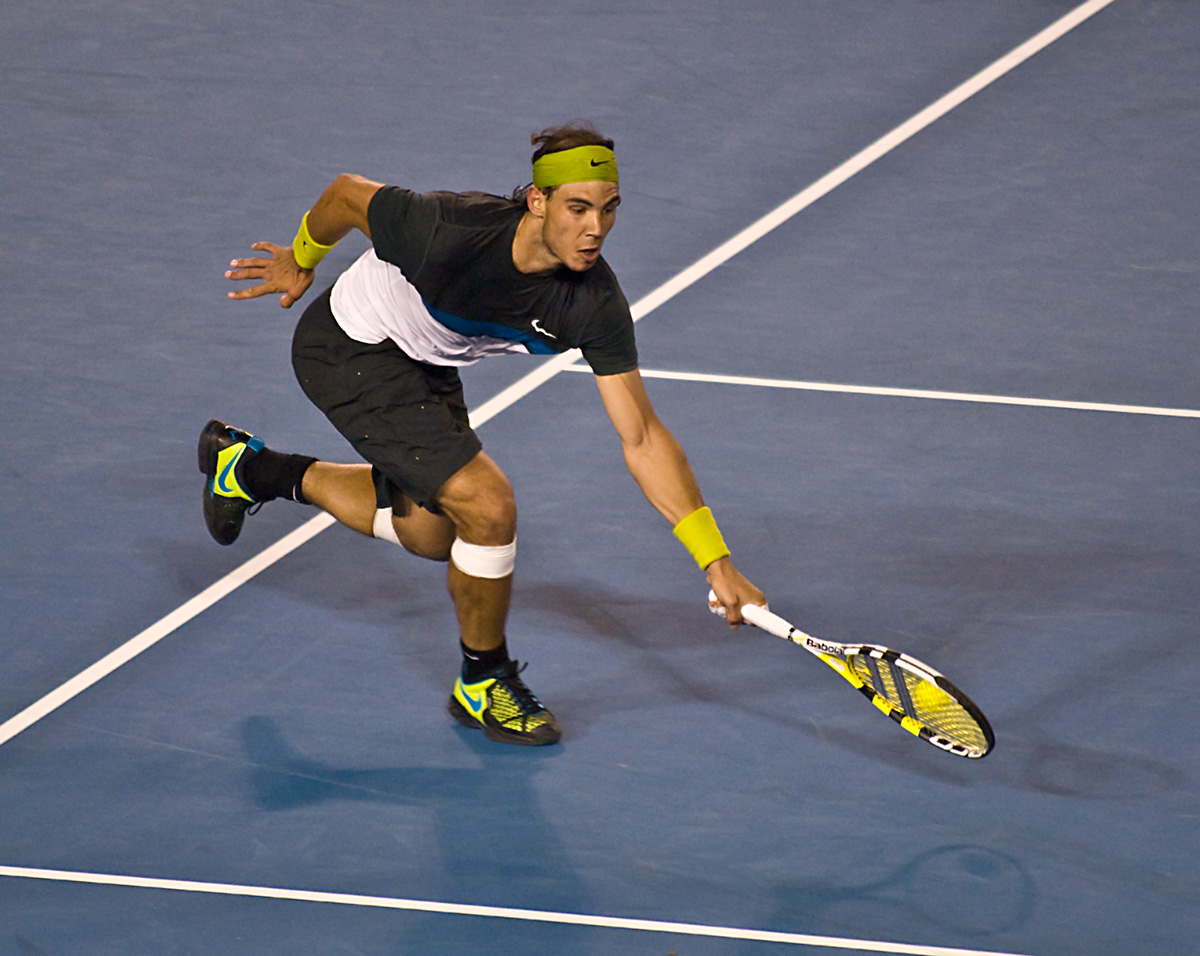
Nadal in the finals of Australian Open 2009.

On clay, Federer rebounded against Nadal at the Madrid Masters, their first match in Spain, defeating him in the final in straight sets. This was a pivotal match because it broke Nadal's five-match winning streak against Federer. The victory by Federer also ended Nadal's 33-match winning streak on clay and foreshadowed Federer's historic victory at that year's French Open, which completed his Career Grand Slam. At year's end, their head-to-head record concluded at 13–7 in Nadal's favour.

=== 2010: Madrid, World Tour Finals ===
In 2010, Federer and Nadal played twice, with Nadal winning the first and Federer winning the second match.

The two met on clay in the final of the Madrid Open, one year after their last match. This time, in a rematch of last year's Madrid Open Final, Nadal defeated Federer in straight sets.

They then met on an indoor hard court in the final of the World Tour Finals, marking their third meeting at the year-end championships and their first ever meeting in the finals. Federer continued his indoor dominance against Nadal, winning in three sets. This victory gave Federer a record-tying fifth title at the year-end tournament.

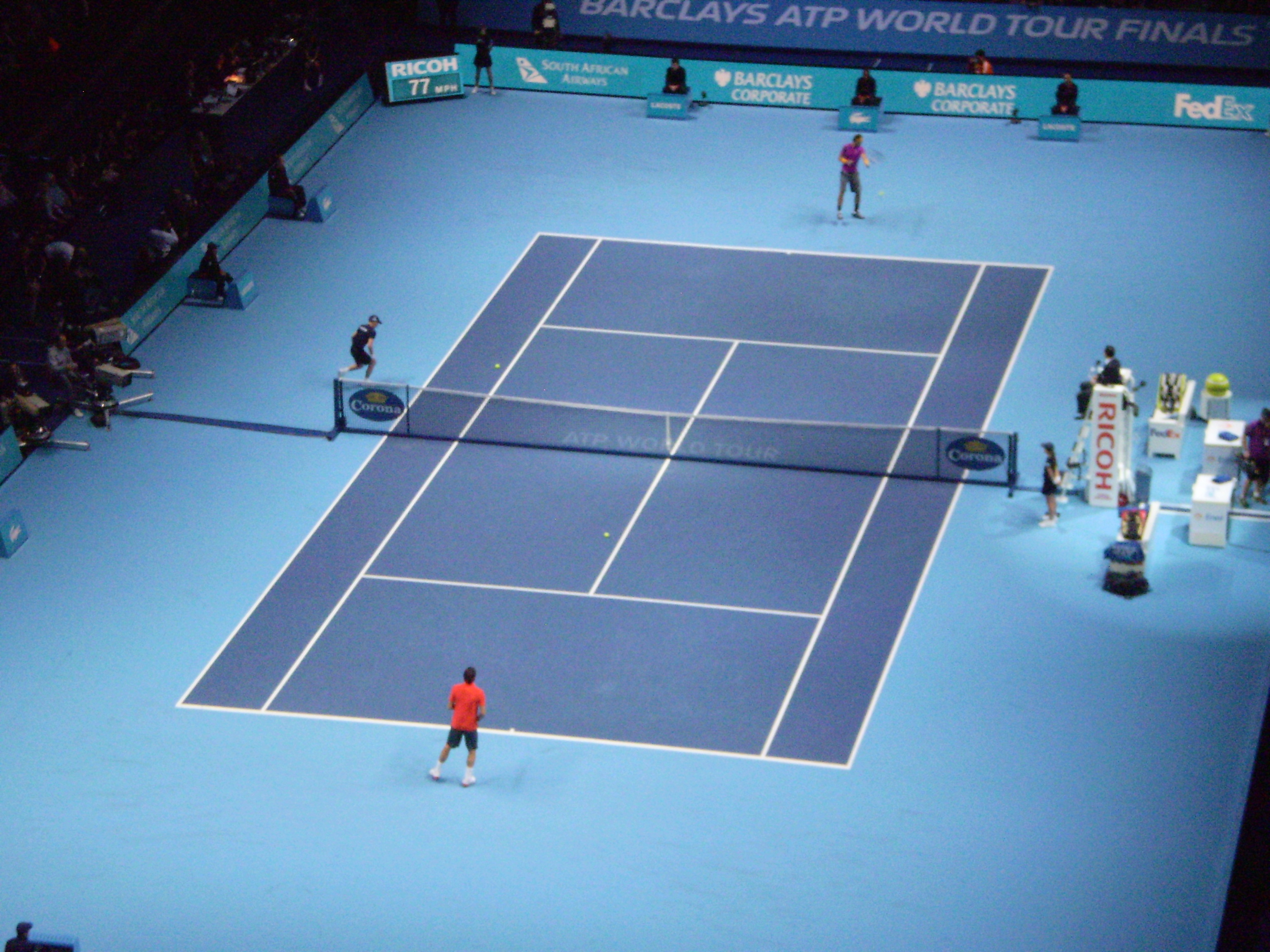
Federer and Nadal met in the finals of the Year-end championships for the first time in 2010.

=== 2011: Miami, Madrid, French Open, World Tour Finals ===
Federer and Nadal played four singles matches, with Nadal winning the first three matches and Federer winning the last match. Their lone doubles match was at Indian Wells. Federer, partnering with Stan Wawrinka, defeated Nadal and Marc López in the semifinals.

In their first singles match that year, which took place during the early hard-court season, the two met in the semifinals of the Miami Masters, where Nadal won in straight sets.

They then met on clay in the semifinals at the Madrid Open, and Nadal won in three sets. Later in the clay season, they met in the final of the French Open, their first Grand Slam tournament meeting since the 2009 Australian Open final. Although it was a competitive match, Nadal again defeated Federer in four sets to win his tenth Grand Slam title and sixth French Open crown. This denied Federer an opportunity to become the first man in the Open Era to have won all four Grand Slam tournaments twice.

Their final meeting of the year came in the round-robin stage of the World Tour Finals. Their match, a rematch of the previous year's final, saw Federer win a lopsided match in straight sets.

=== 2012: Australian Open, Indian Wells ===
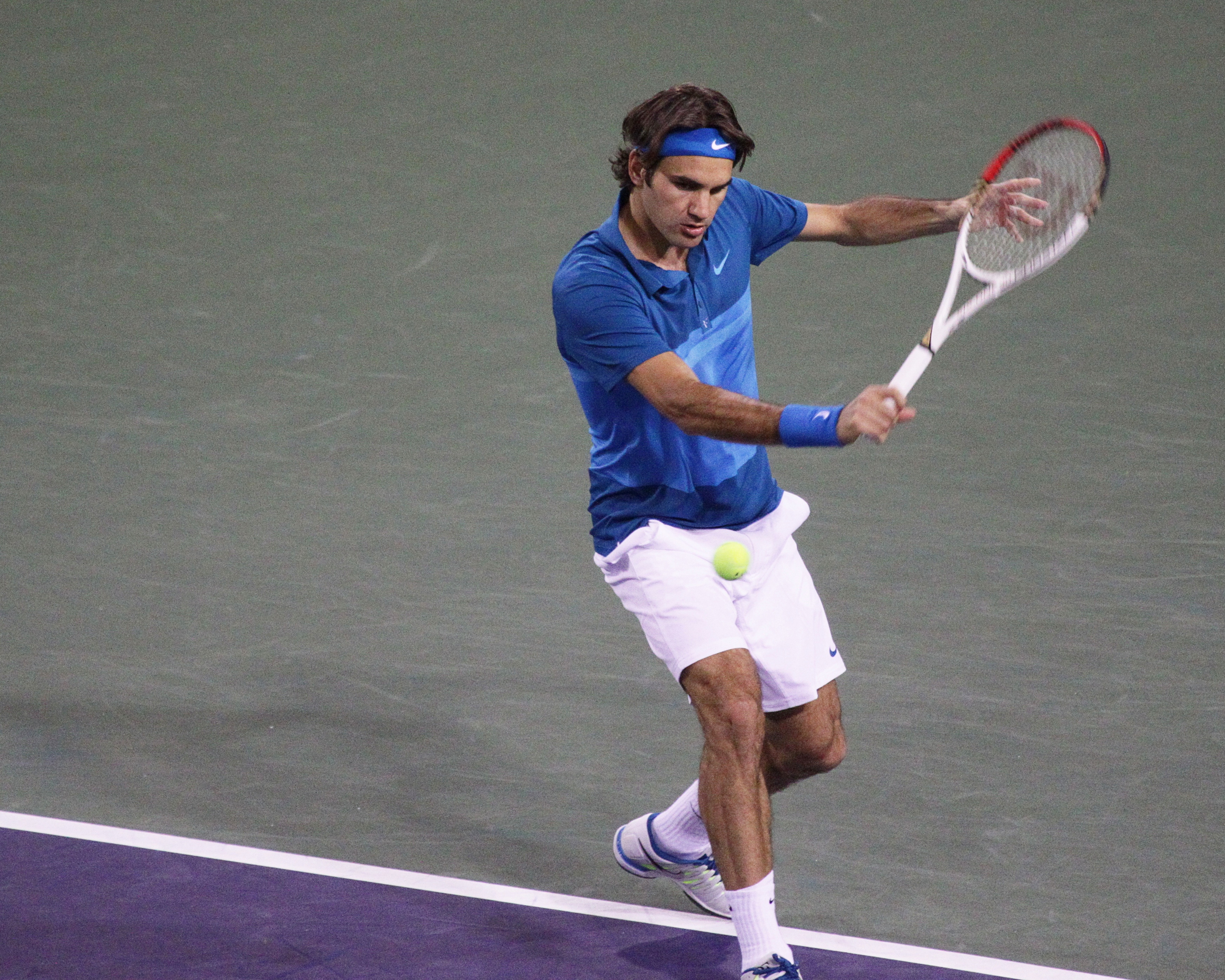
Federer defeated Nadal in a memorable first meeting at Indian Wells that included a rain delay on match point.

Federer and Nadal met twice in 2012, both times in the early hard-court season, splitting their matches. They first met during 2012 in the semifinal at the Australian Open. Federer was leading by a set but trailed 2–5 in the second set, before a 10-minute fireworks delay due to the celebrations of Australia Day. After the delay, Nadal came back to win in four sets, improving his hard-court record over Federer.

They next met in the semifinal at Indian Wells, where Federer won the match in straight sets en route to claiming his fourth title at that tournament.

=== 2013: Indian Wells, Rome, Cincinnati, World Tour Finals ===
Federer and Nadal met four times in 2013 with Nadal prevailing on every occasion.

Federer and Nadal met for the first time in the quarterfinals of the Indian Wells Masters. It was the earliest stage the pair had met at within a tournament since 2004, due to their top seedings for most of the intervening years. Nadal won in straight sets.

On 1 April, by winning the Miami Masters, Andy Murray passed Federer in the ATP rankings for second place. This marked the first time since 10 November 2003 that neither Federer nor Nadal was ranked in the ATP top 2 (Novak Djokovic had taken the number 1 spot in 2011), a span of an unprecedented 490 weeks.

During the clay-court season, Nadal defeated Federer in the final of the Rome Masters in two sets.

In the second half of the season, they met in the quarterfinals at the Cincinnati Open, where Nadal unseated the five-time champion in three sets. Federer had just switched back to his old racquet after experimenting with a larger frame in his previous two tournaments. They next met in the semifinal of the World Tour Finals, with Nadal prevailing in straight sets. This was Nadal's first win over Federer on indoor hard courts. It would also be Federer's last career match played with his 90-inch racquet before upgrading to a larger frame.

=== 2014: Australian Open ===
Federer and Nadal had their only meeting of the 2014 season in the semifinals of the Australian Open. Nadal won in straight sets and improved his record to 3–0 against Federer at the Australian Open (9–2 overall in majors). This was the first Major that Federer played after switching to a larger racquet.

=== 2015: Basel ===
In November 2015, Federer defeated Nadal in three sets in the final of the Swiss Indoors. This was their first and only encounter on Swiss soil, as Federer captured a seventh title in his hometown of Basel. It was Federer's first victory over Nadal in over 3 and a half years, having lost the previous five meetings.

=== 2017: Australian Open, Indian Wells, Miami, Shanghai ===
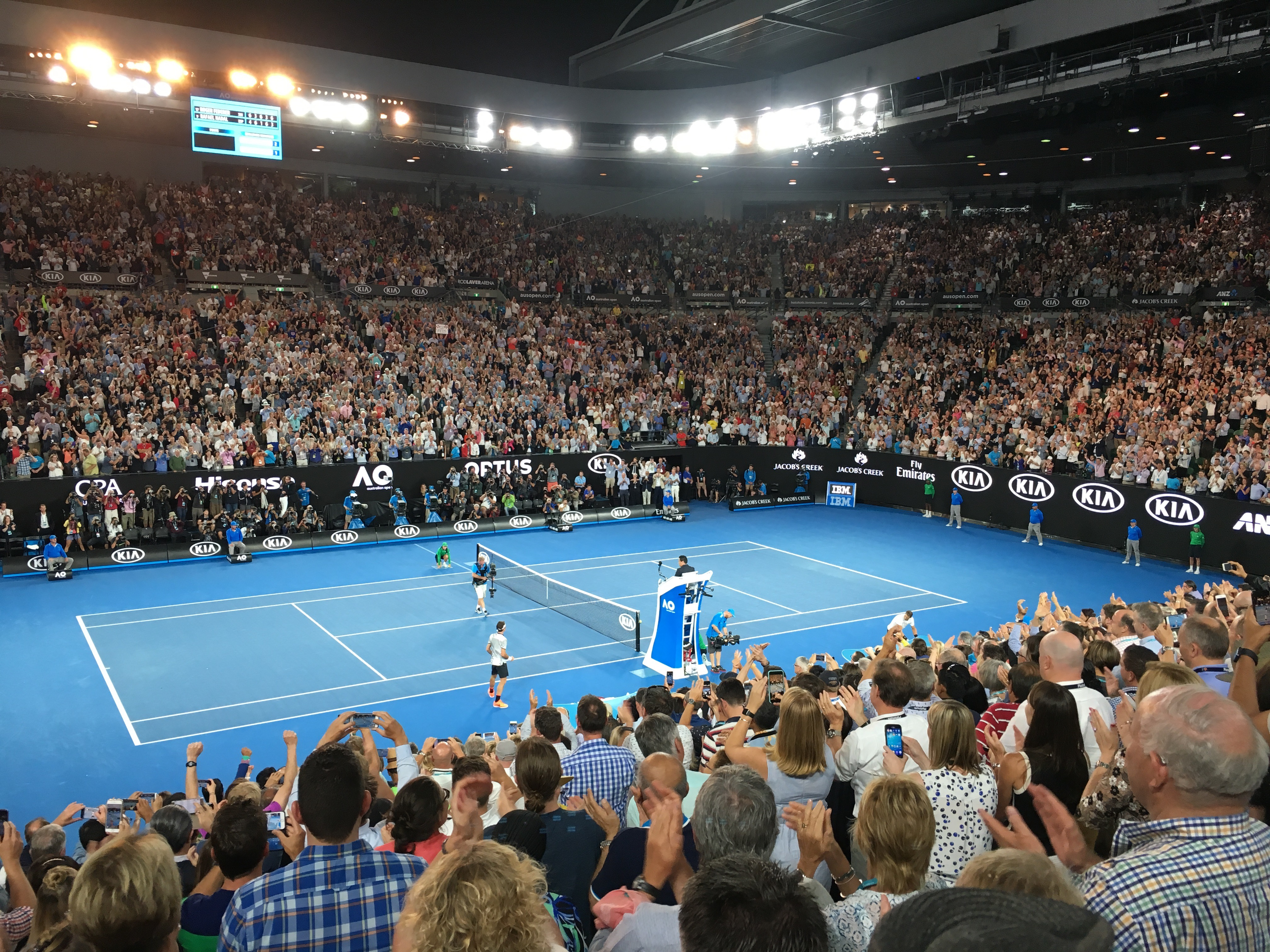
Federer defeated Nadal to capture a record 18th Grand Slam title.

Federer and Nadal played four times in 2017, with Federer prevailing on all four occasions. This marked the first time in their rivalry that Federer went undefeated against Nadal in multiple meetings in a single season.

The rivalry was renewed in the 2017 Australian Open final, their first meeting in a major final since the 2011 French Open. Federer, returning from a six-month layoff from knee injury that saw him miss the second half of the 2016 season, came into the tournament seeded 17th, and Nadal seeded 9th. Prior to the match, Nadal had won every match between the two in a major since the Wimbledon final in 2007, three of which were in the Australian Open. Federer came back from a break down in the fifth set to take the match, becoming the first man in history to win 18 Grand Slam singles titles and the first man to win at least five titles in three different Grand Slam tournaments each, and denying Nadal's third effort to win the Australian Open title again and also his second opportunity to become the first man in the Open Era to win each Grand Slam tournament in men's singles at least twice. Federer's victory also marked his first win over Nadal in a Grand Slam match outside the grass courts of Wimbledon.

They met again at Indian Wells in the round of 16, only their second-ever meeting before the quarterfinal stage in any tournament. Federer prevailed in straight sets; it was the first time he had won three matches in a row against Nadal. Their 37th meeting came in the Miami final. This was their first meeting in a final on American soil since the 2005 Miami final, and Federer won in straight sets, his 4th consecutive win over Nadal.

In the 2017 Laver Cup the two played doubles together for the first time, against Sam Querrey/Jack Sock, and won in a match tiebreak.

Federer and Nadal met at the Shanghai Masters for the first time, contesting the final. Federer won in straight sets, claiming a fifth consecutive win over Nadal. This was the first time they had contested a match as the top two ranked players in the world since the 2010 ATP Finals.

Federer's newfound success against Nadal was ascribed to improvement in his backhand, with which he hit harder and more easily returned Nadal's high bouncing forehand with a larger racquet.

=== 2019: French Open, Wimbledon ===
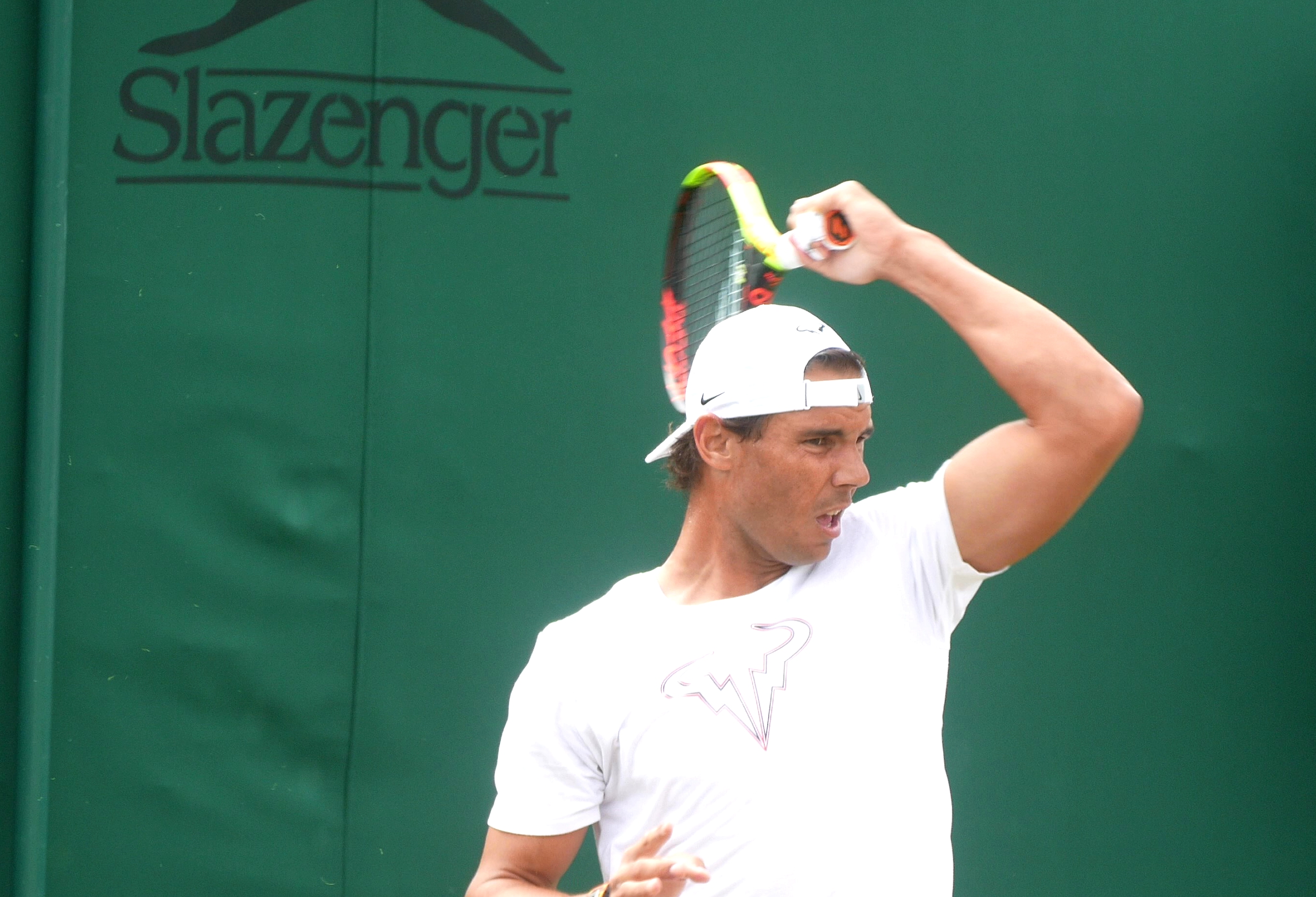
Nadal in 2019 Wimbledon

In 2019 Federer and Nadal met twice, with each prevailing once. They would have met in the semifinal of the Indian Wells Masters, but Nadal withdrew from the match due to a right hip injury, giving Federer a walkover victory to the final. They met for the first time in this year in the semifinal of the French Open with Nadal ending Federer's run of five consecutive wins over him by prevailing in straight sets, before going on to win the tournament for his twelfth title there.

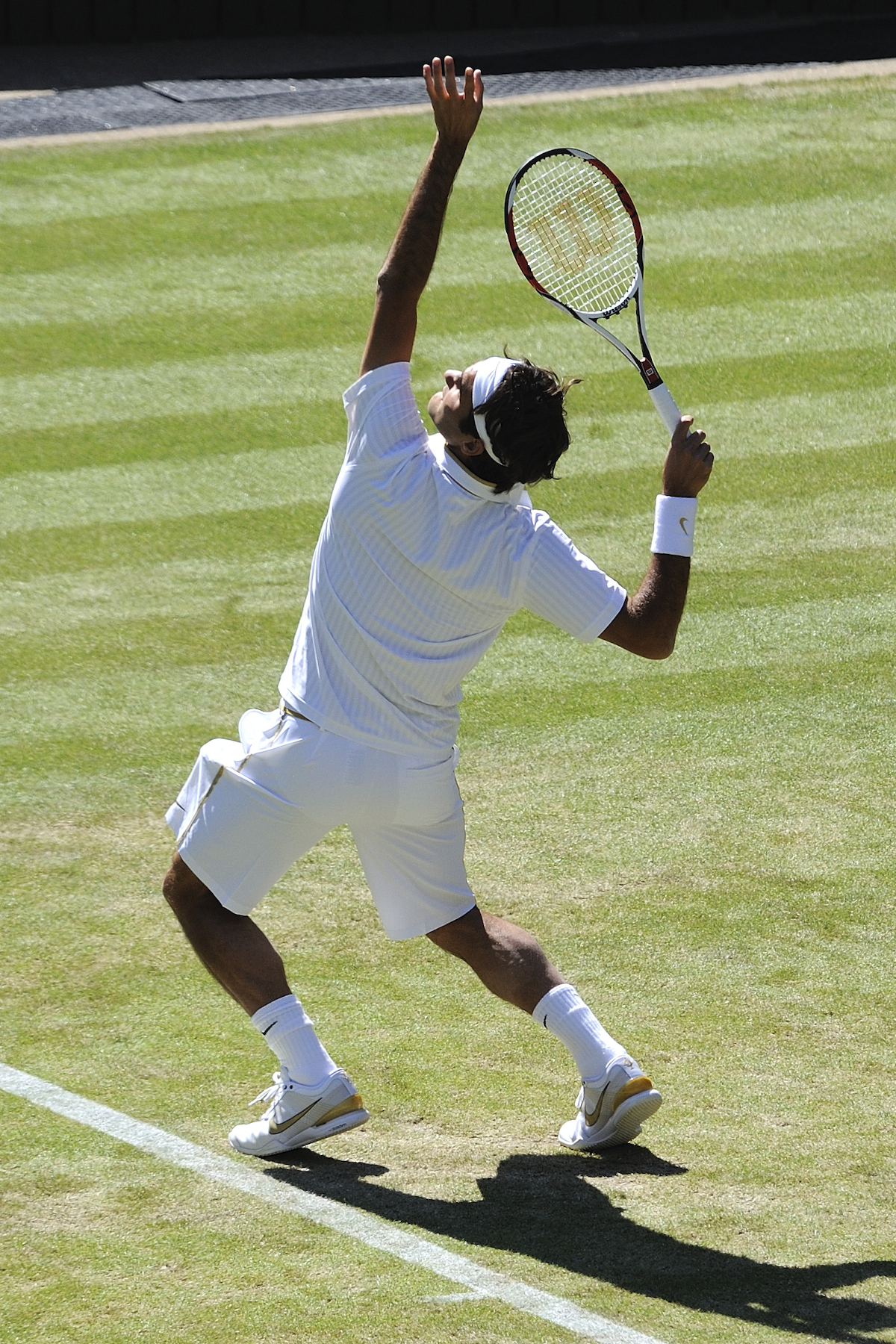
Federer 2019 Wimbledon

The pair met in the semifinals of Wimbledon in their first Wimbledon encounter since 2008. This was the only match between the two in Wimbledon which was not in the final. Federer defeated Nadal in four sets. This match was the oldest by the combined age of competitors (71 years, 0 months) in the Open Era of tennis.

With Federer's retirement in 2022, their 2019 Wimbledon semifinals encounter stands as the last competitive tour match of the Federer-Nadal rivalry, concluding their head-to-head record on the professional tour at 24–16 in Nadal's favour.

== List of all head-to-head matches ==
ATP, Davis Cup, and Grand Slam main draw results included.

Legend (2004–2008)	Legend (2009–present)	Federer	Nadal
Grand Slam	Grand Slam	4	10
Tennis Masters Cup	ATP Finals	4	1
ATP Masters Series	ATP Tour Masters 1000	7	12
ATP International Series Gold	ATP Tour 500 Series	1	1
Total		16	24

=== Singles (40) ===
Federer 16 – Nadal 24

No.	Year	Tournament	Series	Surface	Round	Winner	Score	Length	Sets	Federer	Nadal
1.	2004	Miami Open	Masters	Hard	Last 32	Nadal	6–3, 6–3	1:10	2/3	0	1
2.	2005	Miami Open	Masters	Hard	Final	Federer	2–6, 6–7^{(4–7)}, 7–6^{(7–5)}, 6–3, 6–1	3:43	5/5	1	1
3.	2005	French Open	Major	Clay	Semifinals	Nadal	6–3, 4–6, 6–4, 6–3	2:47	4/5	1	2
4.	2006	Dubai Championships	500	Hard	Final	Nadal	2–6, 6–4, 6–4	1:53	3/3	1	3
5.	2006	Monte-Carlo Masters	Masters	Clay	Final	Nadal	6–2, 6–7^{(2–7)}, 6–3, 7–6^{(7–5)}	3:50	4/5	1	4
6.	2006	Italian Open	Masters	Clay	Final	Nadal	6–7^{(0–7)}, 7–6^{(7–5)}, 6–4, 2–6, 7–6^{(7–5)}	5:05	5/5	1	5
7.	2006	French Open	Major	Clay	Final	Nadal	1–6, 6–1, 6–4, 7–6^{(7–4)}	3:02	4/5	1	6
8.	2006	Wimbledon	Major	Grass	Final	Federer	6–0, 7–6^{(7–5)}, 6–7^{(2–7)}, 6–3	2:58	4/5	2	6
9.	2006	Tennis Masters Cup	Tour Finals	Hard (i)	Semifinals	Federer	6–4, 7–5	1:53	2/3	3	6
10.	2007	Monte-Carlo Masters	Masters	Clay	Final	Nadal	6–4, 6–4	1:35	2/3	3	7
11.	2007	Hamburg Masters	Masters	Clay	Final	Federer	2–6, 6–2, 6–0	1:55	3/3	4	7
12.	2007	French Open	Major	Clay	Final	Nadal	6–3, 4–6, 6–3, 6–4	3:10	4/5	4	8
13.	2007	Wimbledon	Major	Grass	Final	Federer	7–6^{(9–7)}, 4–6, 7–6^{(7–3)}, 2–6, 6–2	3:45	5/5	5	8
14.	2007	Tennis Masters Cup	Tour Finals	Hard (i)	Semifinals	Federer	6–4, 6–1	0:59	2/3	6	8
15.	2008	Monte-Carlo Masters	Masters	Clay	Final	Nadal	7–5, 7–5	1:43	2/3	6	9
16.	2008	Hamburg Masters	Masters	Clay	Final	Nadal	7–5, 6–7^{(3–7)}, 6–3	2:52	3/3	6	10
17.	2008	French Open	Major	Clay	Final	Nadal	6–1, 6–3, 6–0	1:48	3/5	6	11
18.	2008	Wimbledon	Major	Grass	Final	Nadal	6–4, 6–4, 6–7^{(5–7)}, 6–7^{(8–10)}, 9–7	4:48	5/5	6	12
19.	2009	Australian Open	Major	Hard	Final	Nadal	7–5, 3–6, 7–6^{(7–3)}, 3–6, 6–2	4:23	5/5	6	13
20.	2009	Madrid Open	Masters	Clay	Final	Federer	6–4, 6–4	1:26	2/3	7	13
21.	2010	Madrid Open	Masters	Clay	Final	Nadal	6–4, 7–6^{(7–5)}	2:10	2/3	7	14
22.	2010	ATP World Tour Finals	Tour Finals	Hard (i)	Final	Federer	6–3, 3–6, 6–1	1:37	3/3	8	14
23.	2011	Miami Open	Masters	Hard	Semifinals	Nadal	6–3, 6–2	1:18	2/3	8	15
24.	2011	Madrid Open	Masters	Clay	Semifinals	Nadal	5–7, 6–1, 6–3	2:36	3/3	8	16
25.	2011	French Open	Major	Clay	Final	Nadal	7–5, 7–6^{(7–3)}, 5–7, 6–1	3:40	4/5	8	17
26.	2011	ATP World Tour Finals	Tour Finals	Hard (i)	Round Robin	Federer	6–3, 6–0	1:00	2/3	9	17
27.	2012	Australian Open	Major	Hard	Semifinals	Nadal	6–7^{(5–7)}, 6–2, 7–6^{(7–5)}, 6–4	3:42	4/5	9	18
28.	2012	Indian Wells Masters	Masters	Hard	Semifinals	Federer	6–3, 6–4	1:31	2/3	10	18
29.	2013	Indian Wells Masters	Masters	Hard	Quarterfinals	Nadal	6–4, 6–2	1:24	2/3	10	19
30.	2013	Italian Open	Masters	Clay	Final	Nadal	6–1, 6–3	1:08	2/3	10	20
31.	2013	Cincinnati Masters	Masters	Hard	Quarterfinals	Nadal	5–7, 6–4, 6–3	2:14	3/3	10	21
32.	2013	ATP World Tour Finals	Tour Finals	Hard (i)	Semifinals	Nadal	7–5, 6–3	1:19	2/3	10	22
33.	2014	Australian Open	Major	Hard	Semifinals	Nadal	7–6^{(7–4)}, 6–3, 6–3	2:24	3/5	10	23
34.	2015	Swiss Indoors	500	Hard (i)	Final	Federer	6–3, 5–7, 6–3	2:03	3/3	11	23
35.	2017	Australian Open	Major	Hard	Final	Federer	6–4, 3–6, 6–1, 3–6, 6–3	3:37	5/5	12	23
36.	2017	Indian Wells Masters	Masters	Hard	Last 16	Federer	6–2, 6–3	1:08	2/3	13	23
37.	2017	Miami Open	Masters	Hard	Final	Federer	6–3, 6–4	1:34	2/3	14	23
38.	2017	Shanghai Masters	Masters	Hard	Final	Federer	6–4, 6–3	1:12	2/3	15	23
—	2019	Indian Wells Masters	Masters	Hard	Semifinals	(Federer)	Walkover	N/A	N/A	15	23
39.	2019	French Open	Major	Clay	Semifinals	Nadal	6–3, 6–4, 6–2	2:25	3/5	15	24
40.	2019	Wimbledon	Major	Grass	Semifinals	Federer	7–6^{(7–3)}, 1–6, 6–3, 6–4	3:02	4/5	16	24

=== Doubles ===
Federer—Nadal (1–2)

No.	Year	Tournament	Surface	Round	Winner	Score	Opponents	Federer	Nadal
1.	2004	(United States) Indian Wells Masters	Hard	Last 16	Nadal/Robredo	5–7, 6–4, 6–3	Federer/Allegro	0	1
2.	2007	(Italy) Italian Open	Clay	Last 32	Nadal/Moyá	6–4, 7–6^{(7–5)}	Federer/Wawrinka	0	2
3.	2011	(United States) Indian Wells Masters	Hard	Semifinals	Federer/Wawrinka	7–5, 6–3	Nadal/M. López	1	2

As a pair (1–1)

No.	Year	Tournament	Surface	Round	Winner	Score	Opponents	Wins	Losses
1.	2017	Laver Cup	Hard (i)	Day 2	Federer/Nadal	6–4, 1–6, [10–5]	Querrey/Sock	1	0
2.	2022	Laver Cup	Hard (i)	Day 1	Sock/Tiafoe	4–6, 7–6^{(7–2)}, [11–9]	Federer/Nadal	1	1

=== Exhibitions ===
Federer—Nadal (3–7)

On 21 November 2006 they played an exhibition match on a hard court in Seoul, South Korea. Federer won 6–3, 3–6, 6–3.

On 2 May 2007 they played in the "Battle of Surfaces" on a hybrid court that was half clay and half grass. This match was held at the Palma Arena in Palma, the capital city of Nadal's native Mallorca. Nadal won 7–5, 4–6, 7–6^{(12–10)}.

On 21 December 2010 they played in Zürich, Switzerland on a hard court a charity tennis match for the Roger Federer Foundation. Federer won 4–6, 6–3, 6–3. They played another exhibition match on 22 December 2010 in Madrid, Spain. Nadal won 7–6^{(7–3)}, 4–6, 6–1. This was a charity tennis match for the Fundación Rafa Nadal (Rafael Nadal Foundation).

On 1 January 2011 they played in the final of the knockout exhibition tournament; the Mubadala World Tennis Championship on a hard court. Federer had beaten Söderling in the previous round and Nadal had beaten Berdych in the previous round. Nadal won the encounter by a score of 7–6^{(7–4)}, 7–6^{(7–3)}.

On 8 March 2011 the two played a set at Matthew Knight Arena in Eugene, Oregon, United States. Nadal won the charity exhibition 7–5.

On 31 December 2011 they played again at Mubadala 2011 Mubadala World Tennis Championship (December) on a hard court, this time for third place. Nadal won again 6–1, 7–5.

On 12 December 2015 they played two matches in New Delhi, India at 2015 International Premier Tennis League season on a hard court. Nadal won both a set of singles against Federer 6–5^{(7–4)} and, paired with Rohan Bopanna, a doubles set against Roger Federer and Marin Cilic 6–4 to lead the Indian Aces to a 30–19 victory over the UAE Royals.

On 7 February 2020 they played in Cape Town, South Africa to raise money for the Roger Federer Foundation. Federer won 6–4, 3–6, 6–3.

== Analysis ==
=== Significant aspects ===
The rivalry between Federer and Nadal has been a huge part of both men's careers. Their Grand Slam tournament histories are of particular interest, especially their all-time record of nine finals encounters. This includes playing French Open and Wimbledon finals for three consecutive years (2006–08), culminating in what many consider the greatest match in tennis history at Wimbledon 2008. Nadal, who had to defeat Federer during each of his first six Grand Slam title runs, possesses a 6–3 advantage in their Grand Slam finals encounters as well as a 4–1 edge in semifinals.

Nadal denied Federer three Career Grand Slams by defeating him at the French Open every year from 2005 to 2008. Federer would complete a Career Grand Slam by winning the French title in 2009 after Nadal was upset in the fourth round. Meanwhile, Federer twice denied Nadal from becoming the first man since Björn Borg in 1980 to win the "Channel Slam" (both the French Open and Wimbledon in the same year) by defeating him in their first two Wimbledon finals, but Nadal succeeded the following year by defeating Federer in the final. This was the first of three combined Channel Slams with Federer accomplishing it in 2009 followed by Nadal's second in 2010. Federer has also prevented Nadal from winning the Year-end championships by defeating him in the 2010 finals and eliminating Nadal from the tournament in the 2006 and 2007 semifinals preventing Nadal from becoming only the second man after Andre Agassi to win a Career Grand Slam, a gold singles Olympic medal, and the Year End Championships, a distinction dubbed as a "Career Super Slam" by Sports Illustrated. At the 2017 Australian Open final, Federer denied Nadal's second opportunity (the 2014 Australian Open final was the first) to become the first man in the Open Era to have won each of the Grand Slam tournaments twice in men's singles. Nadal completed his Double Career Grand Slam in 2022 when he won the Australian Open for the second time, in this occasion against Daniil Medvedev.

Their record six consecutive calendar years atop the rankings from 2005 to 2010 was due to their unprecedented combined performance in the Grand Slam and Masters Series tournaments. During this span, they captured a combined record 21 of the 24 Grand Slam tournament titles (12 for Federer, 9 for Nadal), including a record 11 consecutive titles from 2005 to 2007. They also dominated the Masters Series, combining for 31 of the 54 titles (18 for Nadal, 13 for Federer), including 8 of 9 in 2005 (4 each). Additionally, Federer won 4 of 6 year-end tournaments.

Finally, both men not only possess Open-Era records for consecutive wins on a single surface—Federer on both grass (65) and hard courts (56), Nadal on clay courts (81)—but each of these streaks was broken by the other player. Their respective dominance on grass and clay was the impetus for the "Battle of Surfaces", an exhibition match on a half-grass, half-clay court, which Nadal won with a 12–10 in the deciding tiebreak in May 2007 when both the grass and clay streaks were still active.

Of their 40 matches, 20 have been on hard court, 16 have been on clay, and 4 have been on grass. Federer has an edge on his best surface, grass (3–1), and on hard court (11–9) while Nadal dominates Federer on his best surface, clay (14–2). Nadal leads 10–4 in all Grand Slam tournament matches, 6–0 on clay, 3–1 on hard courts and trails 1–3 on the grass in major tournaments.

The contrast in playing style has been a source of debate for commentators and analysts. The heavy topspin created by Nadal's groundstrokes combined with his strategy of directing the majority of his serves and groundstrokes to Federer's single-handed backhand keeps Federer on the defensive and makes it harder for Federer to use his aggressive groundstrokes to dominate baseline rallies as he typically does against other opponents. Federer says he is a "different player due to Nadal's presence" citing Nadal's game as a major reason for improvements in areas of his own game.

From 2004 to 2007, the rivalry stood at 8–6 in Nadal's favour, though Federer led on both grass (2–0) and hardcourt (3–2), Nadal led 6–1 on clay. However, from 2008 to 2014, Nadal compiled a lopsided 15–4 record, leading on each surface, grass (1–0), hard (7–3) and clay (7–1). Since then, Federer has dominated the rivalry with a 6–1 record (5–0 hard, 1–0 grass, 0–1 clay). Federer has stated that early defeats to Nadal on clay courts had a long-lasting mental effect on him in his matches against Nadal on other surfaces, and that the lopsided loss at 2008 French open affected him in his first two sets at 2008 Wimbledon final. After his win over Nadal at 2017 Shanghai masters final, Federer credited his 2017 success against Nadal to a bigger racquet frame and avoiding claycourt meetings against him since 2013.

=== Grand Slam tournament titles ===
As of 2023, Nadal has won 22 Grand Slam titles, ahead of Federer's 20. Federer's Grand Slam tournament titles include 11 on hard courts, 8 on grass, and 1 on clay, while Nadal's Grand Slam titles include 14 on clay, 6 on hard courts, and 2 on grass.

Federer has won a Career Grand Slam (winning all four majors at least once), while Nadal was the second person to achieve Double Career Grand Slam (winning all four majors at least twice) in the Open Era after Djokovic.

Tournament	Federer	Nadal
Australian Open	6	2
French Open	1	**14**
Wimbledon	**8**	2
US Open	5	4
**Total Count**	20	22

- **Bold** indicates outright record.

=== ATP Masters ===
Rafael Nadal has won 36 Masters 1000 titles, with 26 on clay and 10 on hard courts. Roger Federer has won 28 (third all time), with 22 coming on hard courts and 6 on clay. Federer is missing two Masters 1000 titles, both of which are played on clay (Monte Carlo and Rome) while Nadal is also missing two, both of which are played on hard courts (Miami and Paris).

Federer has made the final of Monte Carlo and Rome 4 times each, losing to Nadal in Monte Carlo three times (2006 to 2008) and Rome twice (2006 and 2013). The 2006 Rome final was won by Nadal in a fifth-set tiebreak, lasted for over five hours and is considered by some to be one of the greatest and most memorable matches ever contested on clay.

Nadal has made the final of Miami 5 times (2005, 2008, 2011, 2014 and 2017) but lost each time, including twice to Federer (2005 and 2017). The 2005 final was their second ever meeting and a memorable five-set final. Nadal won the first and second sets, was up a break in the third set, and was two points away from victory before Federer came back from two sets down to win. Nadal has made the final of Paris once (2007).

Tournament	Federer	Nadal
Indian Wells Masters	**5**	3
Miami Open	4	0
Monte-Carlo Masters	0	**11**
German Open^{1}	**4**	1
Madrid Open^{1}	2	**4**
Italian Open	0	**10**
Canadian Open	2	**5**
Cincinnati Masters	**7**	1
Shanghai Masters^{2}	2	0
Madrid Open (indoor hard)^{2}	1	1
Paris Masters	1	0
**Total Count**	28	36

- **Bold** indicates outright record (ATP Masters).

^{1} Held as Hamburg Masters (clay) until 2008, Madrid Masters (clay) since 2009.
^{2} Held as Stuttgart Masters (indoor hardcourt) in 2001, Madrid Masters (indoor hardcourt) from 2002 to 2008, Shanghai Masters (outdoor hardcourt) since 2009.

=== Year-end championship ===
While Nadal has not won a year-end championship, he has made the finals twice, in 2010 and 2013. Federer defeated Nadal in the 2010 finals and leads their head-to-head for the event 4–1. The ATP Finals has only been played on indoor hard courts since 2006.

Tournament	Federer	Nadal
Year-end championship	6	0

- **Bold** indicates outright record (ATP Finals).

=== National and international representation ===
Federer and Nadal have never faced each other in the Davis Cup or at the Olympics or in any other ITF/ATP team events. Both have won the gold medal at the Olympics in Doubles, Federer in 2008 and Nadal in 2016. Nadal also won the gold medal in Singles at the 2008 Beijing Olympics. Federer won the Silver at the 2012 London Olympics.

Tournament	Federer	Nadal
Olympic Medals	Tennis at the 2012 Summer Olympics – Men's singles Tennis at the 2008 Summer Olympics – Men's doubles	Tennis at the 2008 Summer Olympics – Men's singles Tennis at the 2016 Summer Olympics – Men's Doubles
Davis Cup	1	4
Hopman Cup	**3**	–
Laver Cup	3	2
ATP Cup / United Cup	–	0

- **Bold** indicates outright record.

=== ATP/ITF rankings ===
Rankings	Federer	Nadal
Weeks as ATP No. 1	310	209
ATP Year-end No. 1	5	5
ITF World Champion	5	5
Consecutive Weeks as ATP No. 1	**237**	56
Consecutive ATP Year-end No. 1	4	0
Consecutive wire-to-wire ATP Year-end No. 1	**3**	0

- **Bold** indicates outright record.

=== Main tennis and sports awards ===
Award	Federer	Nadal
ATP Sportsmanship award	**13**	5
ATP Fan Favorite	**19**	1
ATP Arthur Ashe Humanitarian of the year	**2**	1
ATP Most Improved Player of the year	0	1
ATP Comeback Player of the year	**1**	**1**
ATP Newcomer of the year	0	1
ITF Champion of Champions	**1**	0
Laureus World Sportsman of the year	**5**	2
Laureus Comeback Player of the year	**1**	**1**
ESPY Best International Athlete	**1**	**1**
ESPY Best Male Tennis Player	**9**	3
BBC Overseas Sports Personality of the year	**4**	1
L'Équipe Champion of Champions	**4**	**4**
La Gazzetta dello World Sportsman of the year	**4**	0
Marca Leyenda Sport Professional of the year	**1**	**1**

=== Head-to-head tallies ===
- **All matches: (40) Nadal**, 24–16
  - **All finals: (24) Nadal** 14–10
- Grand Slam matches: **Nadal**, 10–4
  - Australian Open: **Nadal**, 3–1
  - French Open: **Nadal**, 6–0
  - Wimbledon: **Federer**, 3–1
- Grand Slam finals: **Nadal**, 6–3
  - Australian Open finals: Tied, 1–1
  - French Open finals: **Nadal**, 4–0
  - Wimbledon finals: **Federer**, 2–1
  - US Open finals: No meetings
- ATP Finals matches: **Federer**, 4–1
- ATP Masters matches: **Nadal**, 12–7
- Best of five set matches: **Nadal**, 12–5
  - Five-set matches: Tied, 3–3
- Best of three set matches: **Nadal**, 12–11
- Grand Slam finals: **Nadal**, 6–3
  - Australian Open: Tied, 1–1
  - French Open: **Nadal**, 4–0
  - Wimbledon: **Federer**, 2–1
- ATP Finals finals: **Federer**, 1–0
- ATP Masters finals: **Nadal**, 7–5
  - Clay courts: **Nadal**, 7–2
  - Hard courts: **Federer**, 3–0

==== Results on each court surface ====
- All matches by court type:
  - Clay courts: **Nadal**, 14–2
  - Grass courts: **Federer**, 3–1
  - Hard courts: **Federer**, 11–9
    - Outdoor: **Nadal**, 8–6
    - Indoor: **Federer**, 5–1
- All finals by court type:
  - Clay courts: **Nadal**, 11–2
  - Grass courts: **Federer**, 2–1
  - Hard courts: **Federer**, 6–2
    - Outdoor: **Federer**, 4–2
    - Indoor: **Federer**, 2–0

==== Set tallies ====
Federer	Set score	Nadal
0	9–7	1
11	7–6	11
4	7–5	7
10	6–4	16
13	6–3	20
5	6–2	9
5	6–1	5
3	6–0	1
50	Total sets	70
41.67%	Total sets	58.33%
569	Total games	615
48.06%	Total games	51.94%
3675	Total points	3772
49.35%	Total points	50.65%

==== Tournament overview ====
Tournament	Hard Court (o)		Clay		Grass		Hard Court (i)		Total	
Tournament	Federer	Nadal	Federer	Nadal	Federer	Nadal	Federer	Nadal	Federer	Nadal
Australian Open	1	3							1	3
French Open			0	6					0	6
Wimbledon					3	1			3	1
Indian Wells Masters	2	1							2	1
Miami Open	2	2							2	2
Monte-Carlo Masters			0	3					0	3
Italian Open			0	2					0	2
Hamburg Masters / Madrid Open			2	3					2	3
Cincinnati Masters	0	1							0	1
Shanghai Masters	1	0							1	0
Dubai Championships	0	1							0	1
Swiss Indoors							1	0	1	0
ATP Finals							4	1	4	1
Total	6	8	2	14	3	1	5	1	16	24

==== Grand Slam Matches timeline ====
- Final matches indicated in **bold**.

Tournament	2004	2005	2006	2007	2008	2009	2010	2011	2012	2013	2014	2015	2016	2017	2018	2019	2020	2021
Australian Open						**N**			N		N			**F**				
French Open		N	**N**	**N**	**N**			**N**								N		
Wimbledon			**F**	**F**	**N**											F		
US Open																		

==== Hard / Grass timeline ====
Tournament	2004	2005	2006	2007	2008	2009	2010	2011	2012	2013	2014	2015	2016	2017	2018	2019	2020	2021
Australian Open						**N**			N		N			**F**				
Dubai			**N**															
Indian Wells									F	N				F				
Miami	N	**F**						N						**F**				
Wimbledon			**F**	**F**	**N**											F		
Cincinnati										N								
Shanghai														**F**				
Basel												**F**						
ATP Finals			F	F			**F**	F		N								

==== Clay timeline ====
Tournament	2004	2005	2006	2007	2008	2009	2010	2011	2012	2013	2014	2015	2016	2017	2018	2019	2020	2021
Monte-Carlo			**N**	**N**	**N**													
Rome			**N**							**N**								
Hamburg/Madrid				**F**	**N**	**F**	**N**	N										
French Open		N	**N**	**N**	**N**			**N**								N		

==== Hard ====
Nadal and Federer have played half of their 40 matches (20) on hard courts, with the head-to-head on this surface at 11–9 in Federer's favour. An important distinction is the relative success of the two players on indoor and outdoor hard courts. In the former, Federer leads Nadal with a 5–1 record, while on outdoor hard courts, Nadal leads 8–6. The quicker conditions and low bounce of the indoor hard courts fit Federer's style, while the slower and high bouncing conditions of most outdoor ones favor Nadal. Federer has defeated Nadal in four out of five encounters they have had at the Year End Championships, including the 2010 final, which are played on indoor hardcourts. This is the only surface on which they have exchanged the lead in their head-to-head, which has happened several times. In reference to their match at the 2012 Australian Open, Nadal has said that Federer is typically the "favourite" on "these kinds of surfaces".

==== Clay ====
Nadal and Federer have played 16 of their 40 matches on clay, with Nadal holding a 14–2 advantage over Federer. The matches comprise 13 tournament finals and 3 semifinals. The Spaniard has won all of their seven meetings in best of five set matches on clay and all six at Roland Garros. Their last match on clay was played at the 2019 French Open.

From 2005 to 2008, Nadal won every French Open, defeating Federer in each of those tournaments (in the 2005 semifinal and the 2006, 2007, 2008 finals), as well as in the 2011 final. From 2005 to 2010, Nadal won at least 2 of the 3 clay Masters events each year, defeating Federer in 6 of those. Statistically, Nadal has the highest win percentage on clay of any player in ATP history, and is second only to Anthony Wilding all-time. As a result, some analysts and players, such as Pat Cash and Conchita Martínez, consider Nadal the greatest clay-court player ever.

==== Grass ====
Federer and Nadal have met four times on grass, specifically the Wimbledon finals from 2006 to 2008, and the semifinal of 2019. Federer has a 3–1 advantage over Nadal on this surface, winning the first two finals and the semifinal, while Nadal won the third final. Federer has won the Wimbledon Championships eight times, and Nadal has won the championships twice. Five of Federer's titles were consecutive titles (from 2003 to 2007), and the sixth, seventh and eighth titles were won in 2009, 2012 and 2017. The 2008 Wimbledon final has been lauded as the greatest match ever by many long-time tennis analysts.

=== Skill comparisons ===
Federer has been more successful than Nadal on fast courts because he hits a flatter forehand and has a faster serve. Grass and indoor hard courts are faster surfaces, so Federer's flatter shots there result in a lower bouncing, faster moving trajectory. Thus, Nadal's topspin is less effective on such faster courts, but is most effective on slower courts such as clay. Nadal has improved his serving speed and placement over the years, but Federer still serves faster on average and earns more aces and service winners, while Nadal has an overall stronger ground stroke game.

While Nadal is statistically weaker than Federer on both hard and grass courts, he has nonetheless achieved considerable success on both surfaces, including notable wins at the 2008 Summer Olympics, Wimbledon (2008 and 2010), the Australian Open (2009, 2022), the US Open (2010, 2013, 2017 and 2019), and at various hard court Masters series tournaments.

Similarly, Federer too has achieved considerable success on clay, winning the French Open (2009) and reaching the finals on four other occasions (2006, 2007, 2008 and 2011) and winning the Madrid/Hamburg Masters six times (2002, 2004, 2005, 2007, 2009 and 2012).

=== Media and player commentary ===
During interviews, many fellow and former players have regarded both Federer and Nadal as among the best tennis players of all time. In November 2010, former player Björn Borg stated that he believed Federer to be the greatest player of all time, but "Rafa has the chance to be the greatest player" if he stays healthy.

Former player and commentator John McEnroe was of a similar opinion, noting in 2010 that "there is an argument to be made that Rafael Nadal may be the greatest player eventually, even possibly now." He has subsequently adjusted his opinion on several occasions, in 2013 noting that he thought Nadal was "the greatest player that ever lived" but later in 2014 bunched Federer, Nadal, Laver and Sampras together as the greatest ever. In July 2015, he reversed his opinion and again backed Roger Federer for the title. In January 2017, after Federer, then 35 years of age and returning to competitive play after a 6-month layoff due to injury, triumphed over Nadal in 5 sets to win the record-breaking 18th major at the 2017 Australian Open, McEnroe remarked that Federer had cemented his status as being the best tennis player of all time, but also left open the possibility that Nadal can be in the running again should he win additional men's singles majors to narrow the gap.

In October 2013, Rod Laver, the only tennis player to achieve the Grand Slam twice, said "When I look at Federer, with what he's accomplished, against the competition that he's accomplished it with, I'd have to say I would think that Roger is the greatest player."

At the press conference following his 9th record French Open win in 2014 and a total of 14 Slams, three shy of Federer's 17, Nadal said that he really does not care much about records, "I'll follow my own path. Then, when my career is over, then we'll count."

In May 2014, eight-time Grand Slam tournament champion Andre Agassi told Singapore's The Straits Times newspaper, via Al Jazeera: "I'd put Nadal number one and Federer number two. Federer separated himself from the field for four years. He separated himself from Andy Roddick and Lleyton Hewitt. Nadal had to deal with Federer, Novak Djokovic, Andy Murray in the golden age of tennis."

In November 2014, former world number 1 player Andy Roddick, in noting his support for Federer, explained why he believes that head-to-head results are not a valid factor in determining the greatest of all time, "For me Roger Federer is still ahead in the greatest-ever debate, with Rafael Nadal second. People talk about their head-to-head being the determining factor, but I can't comprehend a single match-up being the deciding factor. It's about total wins at major tournaments, not an individual match-up, in my mind."

In December 2014, Rafael Nadal's uncle and coach, Toni Nadal, indicated to Spanish radio station Cadena COPE that he believed Federer to be the greatest of all time based on overall statistics and achievements, noting "I think he is (the best of all-time), the numbers say so." A day before the 2017 Australian Open men's singles finals, Toni Nadal further reemphasized his regard on Federer, saying that "When Federer will call it a career, the greatest player in the tennis history won't be there anymore. Looking at titles, he is the greatest at the moment."

In March 2015, former player Pete Sampras made similar arguments about Federer, "You look at the numbers of what he's been able to do, you have to say he's the greatest we've seen". These comments were echoed by Boris Becker in July 2015, "Great respect for Roger Federer! He is our greatest of all time".

== Relationship and competitive dynamic ==
Both Federer and Nadal's personal and professional relationship is good-natured and gracious. Though they are both highly competitive, they maintain a healthy regard for each other and have had virtually no source of personal animosity. The two have made slight criticisms of one another in the past, nevertheless. For example, Federer complained of Nadal's slow, deliberate style of play on the eve of the 2008 Wimbledon final. Nadal criticized Federer before the 2012 Australian Open for his failure to be more vocal about players' grievances on issues such as scheduling and prize money. He subsequently apologized for making his views public, however, and both players maintained that they still enjoyed a good relationship and had high respect for each other, which can often be seen in interviews. Nadal was also once seen watching Federer play a match in his box, and their family members would congratulate each other on match wins.

Despite their cordial relationship, both men had a somewhat different attitude towards their rivalry in its initial years. When Federer was securely atop the tennis world he was ambivalent towards the notion of a rivalry with an opponent five years younger than himself. But after their memorable 2008 Wimbledon final he had no choice but to acknowledge its significance, even admitting "it definitely becomes more and more special the more times we play against each other". A few weeks later, after Nadal had officially surpassed him in the rankings, Federer offered this compliment: "Look at what he had to achieve to get it. That's what I like to see." Nadal has always cherished the rivalry because he looks up to Federer as both a role model and a measuring stick for success.

When interest in their rivalry increased, both Federer and Nadal collaborated to arrange occasional charity exhibition matches to benefit their charities' philanthropic interests. The most recent was the Match for Africa, played on 21 December 2010 in Zurich, Switzerland, which Federer won, and a follow-up match played in Madrid on the following day, titled "Joining Forces for the Benefit of Children", which Nadal won.

=== Cultural impact ===
The rivalry has also increased overall interest in tennis. The highly anticipated 2008 Wimbledon final drew strong television ratings for tennis in both the U.S. and across Europe. The match was also featured on the cover of Sports Illustrated, which was the first time in years that tennis had made its cover. The high-profile status of the rivalry saw Sky Sports comparing it to another modern day rivalry between Cristiano Ronaldo and Lionel Messi.

The pair's rivalry – and indeed mutual respect and friendship – was the subject of the 2009 book Strokes of Genius by L. Jon Wertheim, which explored their career progression and early lives through the prism of the 2008 Wimbledon final. The book consequently inspired a 2018 film of the same name directed by Andrew Douglas, which updated the story to include their comebacks and recent domination of the slams. The documentary includes footage of a 12-year-old Nadal and a number of clips of Federer losing his temper, who admits in the film that he had to change his behaviour in order to progress his career. The documentary also features contributions from former players such as John McEnroe, Björn Borg, Pete Sampras, Tim Henman and Carlos Moyá – Nadal's current coach – and family members including Federer's mother and father.

== Federer–Nadal era ==
=== Combined singles performance timeline (best result) ===
Key
W	F	SF	QF	#R	RR	Q#	DNQ	A	NH

(W) winner; (F) finalist; (SF) semifinalist; (QF) quarterfinalist; (#R) rounds 4, 3, 2, 1; (RR) round-robin stage; (Q#) qualification round; (DNQ) did not qualify; (A) absent; (NH) not held; (SR) strike rate (events won / competed); (W–L) win–loss record.

Tournament	1999	2000	2001	2002	2003	2004	2005	2006	2007	2008	2009	2010	2011	2012	2013	2014	2015	2016	2017	2018	2019	2020	2021	2022	SR
Grand Slam tournaments
Australian Open	Q1^{F}	3R^{F}	3R^{F}	4R^{F}	4R^{F}	W^{F}	SF^{F}	W^{F}	W^{F}	SF^{FN}	W^{N}	W^{F}	SF^{F}	F^{N}	SF^{F}	F^{N}	QF^{N}	SF^{F}	W^{F}	W^{F}	F^{N}	SF^{F}	QF^{N}	W^{N}	8 / 23
French Open	1R^{F}	4R^{F}	QF^{F}	1R^{F}	1R^{F}	3R^{F}	W^{N}	W^{N}	W^{N}	W^{N}	W^{F}	W^{N}	W^{N}	W^{N}	W^{N}	W^{N}	QF^{FN}	3R^{N}	W^{N}	W^{N}	W^{N}	W^{N}	SF^{N}	W^{N}	15 / 24
Wimbledon	1R^{F}	1R^{F}	QF^{F}	1R^{F}	W^{F}	W^{F}	W^{F}	W^{F}	W^{F}	W^{N}	W^{F}	W^{N}	F^{N}	W^{F}	2R^{F}	F^{F}	F^{F}	SF^{F}	W^{F}	SF^{N}	F^{F}	NH	QF^{F}	SF^{N}	10 / 23
US Open	Q2^{F}	3R^{F}	4R^{F}	4R^{F}	4R^{F}	W^{F}	W^{F}	W^{F}	W^{F}	W^{F}	F^{F}	W^{N}	F^{N}	QF^{F}	W^{N}	SF^{F}	F^{F}	4R^{N}	W^{N}	SF^{N}	W^{N}	A	A	4R^{N}	9 / 21
Year-end championships
ATP Finals	Did not qualify			SF^{F}	W^{F}	W^{F}	F^{F}	W^{F}	W^{F}	RR^{F}	SF^{F}	W^{F}	W^{F}	F^{F}	F^{N}	F^{F}	F^{F}	A	SF^{F}	SF^{F}	SF^{F}	SF^{N}	DNQ	RR^{N}	6 / 19
ATP Tour Masters 1000
Indian Wells	A	Q1	1R	3R	2R	W^{F}	W^{F}	W^{F}	W^{N}	SF	W^{N}	SF	F	W^{F}	W^{N}	F	F	SF	W^{F}	F	F	NH	A	F	8 / 20
Miami	1R	2R	QF	F	QF	4R	W^{F}	W^{F}	QF	F	SF	SF	F	SF	A	F	3R	2R	W	2R	W	NH	A	A	4 / 20
Monte Carlo	1R	1R	QF	2R	3R	A	W^{N}	W^{N}	W^{N}	W^{N}	W^{N}	W^{N}	W^{N}	W^{N}	F	F	SF	W^{N}	W^{N}	W^{N}	SF	NH	QF	A	11 / 21
Madrid^{1}	A	1R	1R	W^{F}	3R	W^{F}	W^{F}	A	W^{N}	W^{N}	W^{F}	W	F	W^{F}	W^{N}	W^{N}	F	SF	W^{N}	QF	SF	NH	QF	QF	11 / 21
Rome	A	1R	3R	1R	F	2R	W^{N}	W^{N}	W^{N}	QF	W^{N}	W^{N}	F	W^{N}	W^{N}	F	F	QF	QF	W^{N}	W^{N}	QF	W^{N}	3R	10 / 23
Canada	A	1R	A	1R	SF	W^{F}	W^{N}	W^{F}	F	W^{N}	QF	F	3R	A	W^{N}	F	QF	A	F	W^{N}	W^{N}	NH	A	A	7 / 16
Cincinnati	A	1R	A	1R	2R	1R	W^{F}	QF	W^{F}	SF	W^{F}	W^{F}	QF	W^{N}	W^{F}	W^{F}	W^{F}	3R	QF	F	3R	A	A	2R	8 / 20
Shanghai^{2}	A	2R	2R	QF	SF	2R	W^{N}	W^{F}	F	SF	F	F	3R	SF	SF	W^{F}	SF	2R	W^{F}	SF	QF	NH			4 / 20
Paris	A	1R	2R	QF	QF	A	A	A	F	QF	SF	SF	W^{F}	A	SF	QF	QF	A	QF	SF	SF	SF	A	2R	1 / 17

^{1} Held as Hamburg Masters (outdoor clay) until 2008, Madrid Masters (outdoor clay) 2009 – present.
^{2} Held as Stuttgart Masters (indoor hard) until 2001, Madrid Masters (indoor hard) from 2002 to 2008, and Shanghai Masters (outdoor hard) 2009 – present

=== Grand Slam tournaments ===
Year	Australian Open	French Open	Wimbledon	US Open
2003	(United States) Andre Agassi	(Spain) Juan Carlos Ferrero	(Switzerland) Roger Federer	(United States) Andy Roddick
2004	(Switzerland) Roger Federer	(Argentina) Gastón Gaudio	(Switzerland) Roger Federer	(Switzerland) Roger Federer
2005	(Russia) Marat Safin	(Spain) Rafael Nadal	(Switzerland) Roger Federer	(Switzerland) Roger Federer
2006	(Switzerland) Roger Federer	(Spain) Rafael Nadal	(Switzerland) Roger Federer	(Switzerland) Roger Federer
2007	(Switzerland) Roger Federer	(Spain) Rafael Nadal	(Switzerland) Roger Federer	(Switzerland) Roger Federer
2008	(Serbia) Novak Djokovic	(Spain) Rafael Nadal	(Spain) Rafael Nadal	(Switzerland) Roger Federer
2009	(Spain) Rafael Nadal	(Switzerland) Roger Federer	(Switzerland) Roger Federer	(Argentina) Juan Martín del Potro
2010	(Switzerland) Roger Federer	(Spain) Rafael Nadal	(Spain) Rafael Nadal	(Spain) Rafael Nadal
2011	(Serbia) Novak Djokovic	(Spain) Rafael Nadal	(Serbia) Novak Djokovic	(Serbia) Novak Djokovic
2012	(Serbia) Novak Djokovic	(Spain) Rafael Nadal	(Switzerland) Roger Federer	(United Kingdom) Andy Murray
2013	(Serbia) Novak Djokovic	(Spain) Rafael Nadal	(United Kingdom) Andy Murray	(Spain) Rafael Nadal
2014	(Switzerland) Stan Wawrinka	(Spain) Rafael Nadal	(Serbia) Novak Djokovic	(Croatia) Marin Čilić
2015	(Serbia) Novak Djokovic	(Switzerland) Stan Wawrinka	(Serbia) Novak Djokovic	(Serbia) Novak Djokovic
2016	(Serbia) Novak Djokovic	(Serbia) Novak Djokovic	(United Kingdom) Andy Murray	(Switzerland) Stan Wawrinka
2017	(Switzerland) Roger Federer	(Spain) Rafael Nadal	(Switzerland) Roger Federer	(Spain) Rafael Nadal
2018	(Switzerland) Roger Federer	(Spain) Rafael Nadal	(Serbia) Novak Djokovic	(Serbia) Novak Djokovic
2019	(Serbia) Novak Djokovic	(Spain) Rafael Nadal	(Serbia) Novak Djokovic	(Spain) Rafael Nadal
2020	(Serbia) Novak Djokovic	(Spain) Rafael Nadal	Tournament cancelled*	(Austria) Dominic Thiem
2021	(Serbia) Novak Djokovic	(Serbia) Novak Djokovic	(Serbia) Novak Djokovic	(Russia) Daniil Medvedev
2022	(Spain) Rafael Nadal	(Spain) Rafael Nadal	(Serbia) Novak Djokovic	(Spain) Carlos Alcaraz

* Due to the COVID-19 pandemic, the 2020 edition of the Wimbledon Championships was cancelled.

=== ATP No. 1 ===
Player	Start date	End date	Weeks	Total
(Switzerland) Roger Federer	2 February 2004	17 August 2008	237	237
(Spain) Rafael Nadal	18 August 2008	5 July 2009	46	46
(Switzerland) Roger Federer (2)	6 July 2009	6 June 2010	48	285
(Spain) Rafael Nadal (2)	7 June 2010	3 July 2011	56	102
(Serbia) Novak Djokovic	4 July 2011	8 July 2012	53	53
(Switzerland) Roger Federer (3)	9 July 2012	4 November 2012	17	302
(Serbia) Novak Djokovic (2)	5 November 2012	6 October 2013	48	101
(Spain) Rafael Nadal (3)	7 October 2013	6 July 2014	39	141
(Serbia) Novak Djokovic (3)	7 July 2014	6 November 2016	122	223
(United Kingdom) Andy Murray	7 November 2016	20 August 2017	41	41
(Spain) Rafael Nadal (4)	21 August 2017	18 February 2018	26	167
(Switzerland) Roger Federer (4)	19 February 2018	1 April 2018	6	308
(Spain) Rafael Nadal (5)	2 April 2018	13 May 2018	6	173
(Switzerland) Roger Federer (5)	14 May 2018	20 May 2018	1	309
(Spain) Rafael Nadal (6)	21 May 2018	17 June 2018	4	177
(Switzerland) Roger Federer (6)	18 June 2018	24 June 2018	1	310
(Spain) Rafael Nadal (7)	25 June 2018	4 November 2018	19	196
(Serbia) Novak Djokovic (4)	5 November 2018	3 November 2019	52	275
(Spain) Rafael Nadal (8)	4 November 2019	2 February 2020	13	209

=== Significant achievements ===
- From the 2003 Wimbledon Championships to the 2011 French Open, Federer and Nadal won an unprecedented 26 out of 32 Major titles. In this time, both men have also completed the Career Grand Slam (Nadal has also completed the Career Golden Slam by winning the 2008 Beijing Olympics).
- From Nadal's first Grand Slam tournament victory at the 2005 French Open until the 2011 French Open, Federer and Nadal had won 22 of 25 Major titles (12 for Federer, 10 for Nadal). The exceptions were the 2008 and 2011 Australian Open, won by Novak Djokovic, and the 2009 US Open, won by Juan Martín del Potro.
- Federer and Nadal are the only No. 1 and No. 2 pair in the Open Era to contest the French Open and Wimbledon men's finals back to back in a calendar year. They are also the only pair in the history of tennis to contest both of these finals back to back for three consecutive years (2006–08).
- In the history of tennis, Federer and Nadal are one of two pairs of players to face each other in nine Grand Slam singles finals (2006–08, 2011 French Open, 2006–08 Wimbledon, 2009, 2017 Australian Open), together with Nadal and Djokovic. This broke the previous record of seven finals set by Bill Tilden and William Johnston (1919–25 U.S. Championships). Their match at the 2012 Australian Open also marked a 10th time two players had faced each other in Grand Slam men's singles matches, tying the record set by John McEnroe and Ivan Lendl. This record has now been surpassed by Nadal-Djokovic when they met for the 18th time in a Major at the 2022 French Open quarterfinals.
- Federer and Nadal are the only No. 1 and No. 2 pair to win 11 consecutive Grand Slam singles tournaments between them (from the 2005 French Open to the 2007 US Open). In this period, Federer won 3 consecutive titles at both Wimbledon and the US Open and 2 consecutive titles at the Australian Open, while Nadal won 3 consecutive French Open titles. While both were in their thirties, they won 6 consecutive titles from the Australian Open 2017 to the French Open 2018.
- During the Open Era, only two pairs of players have played each other in the final of the same Grand Slam singles tournament three consecutive years: Becker–Edberg (1988–90 Wimbledon) and Federer-Nadal (2006–08 French Open and 2006–08 Wimbledon).
- Federer and Nadal are the only pair to win at least four consecutive finals at three different Majors during the same period (2005–08 French Open for Nadal, 2003–07 Wimbledon and 2004–08 US Open for Federer).
- From the 2004 Wimbledon Championships to the 2011 French Open, at least one of them appeared in 25 of 28 Major finals, winning all of them except the 2005 Australian Open, the 2008 Australian Open, the 2011 Australian Open, and the 2009 US Open.
- Federer and Nadal have combined to win 8 consecutive Wimbledon (2003–10) and 10 consecutive French Open (2005–14).
- Federer and Nadal won the French Open, Wimbledon and US Open triple for 4 consecutive years (2005–08).
- One of only four pairs to have faced each other in a Major, having both already completed the career Grand Slam. They did this six times. The other pairs being Roy Emerson-Rod Laver, Djokovic-Nadal, and Djokovic-Federer.
- Federer and Nadal have played four five-set Grand Slam finals (Wimbledon 2007 and 2008, Australian Open 2009 and 2017). This is the most five-set Grand Slam finals contested by any pair of players in the Open Era.

== Records ==
=== Grand Slam tournaments (since 1877) ===
- Most Grand Slam finals played against each other in tennis history (shared with Djokovic–Nadal) – 9 (2009 and 2017 Australian Open, 2006–2008 and 2011 French Open and 2006–2008 Wimbledon)
- Most French Open finals played against each other in tennis history – 4 (2006–2008 and 2011)
- Only two players in tennis history to have met in both French Open and Wimbledon finals in the same season for 3 consecutive years (2006–2008)
- Rafael Nadal holds the all-time record for most finals reached at French Open (14) while Federer holds the record at Wimbledon (12)
- Only two players in tennis history to reach more than 4 Grand Slam finals without losing a single set in tournament – 8 times for Nadal (Australian Open 2019, French Open 2007–2008, 2010, 2012, 2017, 2020 and US Open 2010), 6 times for Federer (Wimbledon 2006, 2008, 2017, Australian Open 2007, 2018 and US Open 2015)
- Nadal is the only player in tennis history to win at least 1 Grand Slam title a season for 10 consecutive years (2005–2014), while Federer is the only player in tennis history to win 3 Grand Slam titles a season for 2 consecutive years (2006–2007) and the only to win 2 Grand Slam titles a season for 4 consecutive years (2004–2007).
- They are just 2 of 3 players (the other being Björn Borg) to win 5 consecutive titles at single major tournament in the Open Era (Federer won Wimbledon 5 times from 2003 to 2007 and US Open 5 times from 2004 to 2008; Nadal won French Open 5 times from 2010 to 2014)
- First pair in tennis history to win the 2 first major tournaments of the season 6 times between them (2006–2007, 2009–2010 and 2017–2018)
- Second pair in tennis history (after Roy Emerson and John Newcombe in 1967) to win 2 Grand Slam titles each in a single calendar year (Federer won Australian Open and Wimbledon and Nadal won the French Open and US Open in 2017). Nadal and Djokovic later did this in 2019.

=== Open Era tournaments (since 1968; including Grand Slam tournaments) ===
- They are just 2 of 3 players (the other being Björn Borg) to win more than one Grand Slam tournament without losing a single set (Nadal – French Open 2008, 2010, 2017 and 2020; Federer – Australian Open 2007 and Wimbledon 2017)
- They are just 2 of 5 players (the other being Björn Borg, Djokovic and Sampras) to win more than 30 consecutive matches at a Grand Slam event (Nadal – 31, 35, and 39 at French Open; Federer – 40 at both Wimbledon and US Open)
- Nadal holds the record for most Grand Slam titles on clay (14) while Federer holds the record for most titles on grass (8)
- Only two players to each win a Grand Slam title without losing a single set in the same calendar year (2017)
- Nadal has won the most tournaments on clay with 63 titles, while Federer won the most tournaments on grass (19) and on hard (71)
- Nadal has the longest streak on clay with 81 consecutive matches won from 2005 to 2007, while Federer won the most consecutive matches on grass, 65, from 2003 to 2008 and on hard, 56, from 2005 to 2006. They broke each other's streaks – Nadal beat Federer in the 2006 Dubai final on hard and in the 2008 Wimbledon final on grass, while Federer beat Nadal in the 2007 Hamburg Masters final on clay)
- Only two players to reach more than 12 finals at a single tournament – Federer reached 15 finals in Basel, 13 in Halle, while Nadal reached 14 finals at Roland Garros.
- Two of three players (along with Djokovic) to win one tournament more than 9 times (Nadal: Roland Garros – 14 titles, Barcelona – 12, Monte Carlo – 11 and Rome – 10 titles each, Federer: Halle and Basel – 10 titles each)
- Nadal has the highest record on clay with 91.3% (474–45), while Federer has the best record on grass 86.9% (192–29)
- Nadal won 13 consecutive clay tournaments and reached 18 consecutive clay tournaments finals, while Federer won 10 consecutive grass tournaments and reached 13 consecutive grass tournaments finals
- Only players to win more than 15 titles at ATP 500 tournaments – Federer won 24 titles, Nadal 23
- Only players to reach more than 19 finals at ATP 500 tournaments – Federer reached 31 finals, Nadal 29
- Only players to win more than 890 outdoor matches each (Nadal won 973, Federer won 953)
- Federer has the highest number of titles won at Cincinnati Masters (7), Indian Wells Masters (5, tied with Djokovic) and Hamburg Masters (4), while Nadal won the most titles at Monte Carlo Masters (11), Rome Masters (10) and Madrid Masters (5)
- They are the only two players in the 21st century to win titles on 3 surfaces across consecutive events played (Federer won Wimbledon on grass, Gstaad on clay and Canada Masters on hard in 2004, while Nadal won Roland Garros on clay, both Queen's Club and Wimbledon on grass and Canada Masters on hard in 2008)
- Nadal won the most consecutive sets on clay (50 – from 2017 to 2018), while Federer won the most consecutive sets on grass (36 – from 2003 to 2004 and also second-most on grass – 30 in 2017)

=== ATP rankings (since 1973) ===
- For 6 consecutive seasons (2005–2010) they ended the calendar season as the top 2 players in the world, a men's Open Era record
- Only two players to finish season as No. 2 more than 5 times each (Nadal 8, Federer 6)
- Only two players to finish season in Top 2 more than 6 consecutive times each (Federer – 8 times from 2003 to 2010; Nadal – 7 times from 2005 to 2011)
- They are two of three players (the other being Djokovic) to clinch ATP year-end world No. 1 in September (Federer in 2004 and 2006; Nadal in 2010)

== Miscellaneous ==
- Their 2008 Wimbledon men's singles final match is generally considered as the greatest match in tennis history.
- From 2004 to 2007, Federer won 315 of the 339 matches he played (315–24 record, 92.9% matches won). Nadal was the only player to have a positive record against Federer (with more than 2 matches played) in that time span (8–6)
- In his 2006 season, Federer won 92 of 97 matches he played (92–5 record, 94.9% matches won). Nadal was the only player to hold a positive record against him (with more than 2 matches played), winning 4 matches and losing 2. Federer's only other loss of the year came from Andy Murray at the Cincinnati Masters
- Neither of them won their bronze medal matches at the Olympic Games (Federer in 2000; Nadal in 2016)
- Each of them won golden medal in men's doubles at the Olympic Games (Federer in 2008; Nadal in 2016)
- Each player won three 5-set matches against the other player: 2 in Grand Slam (1 in Australian Open and 1 at Wimbledon) and 1 in Masters Series (all in finals); Federer won 2005 Miami Masters, 2007 Wimbledon and 2017 Australian Open, while Nadal won 2006 Rome Masters, 2008 Wimbledon and 2009 Australian Open. Federer leads 2–1 on hard, Nadal leads 1–0 on clay and they are tied at 1–1 on grass.

== Performance timeline comparison ==
=== Grand Slam tournaments ===
Key
**W**	F	SF	QF	#R	RR	Q#	DNQ	A	NH

(W) winner; (F) finalist; (SF) semifinalist; (QF) quarterfinalist; (#R) rounds 4, 3, 2, 1; (RR) round-robin stage; (Q#) qualification round; (DNQ) did not qualify; (A) absent; (NH) not held; (SR) strike rate (events won / competed); (W–L) win–loss record.
To avoid confusion and double counting, these charts are updated at the conclusion of a tournament or when the player's participation has ended.
- **Bold** = players met during the tournament

==== 1999–2004 ====
Player	1999				2000				2001				2002				2003				2004			
Player	AUS	FRA	WIM	USA	AUS	FRA	WIM	USA	AUS	FRA	WIM	USA	AUS	FRA	WIM	USA	AUS	FRA	WIM	USA	AUS	FRA	WIM	USA
(Switzerland) **Roger Federer**	Q1	1R	1R	Q2	3R	4R	1R	3R	3R	QF	QF	4R	4R	1R	1R	4R	4R	1R	W	4R	W	3R	W	W
(Spain) **Rafael Nadal**																	A	A	3R	2R	3R	A	A	3R

==== 2005–2010 ====
Player	2005				2006				2007				2008				2009				2010			
Player	AUS	FRA	WIM	USA	AUS	FRA	WIM	USA	AUS	FRA	WIM	USA	AUS	FRA	WIM	USA	AUS	FRA	WIM	USA	AUS	FRA	WIM	USA
(Switzerland) **Roger Federer**	SF	**SF**	W	W	W	**F**	**W**	W	W	**F**	**W**	W	SF	**F**	**F**	W	**F**	W	W	F	W	QF	QF	SF
(Spain) **Rafael Nadal**	4R	**W**	2R	3R	A	**W**	**F**	QF	QF	**W**	**F**	4R	SF	**W**	**W**	SF	**W**	4R	A	SF	QF	W	W	W

==== 2011–2016 ====
Player	2011				2012				2013				2014				2015				2016			
Player	AUS	FRA	WIM	USA	AUS	FRA	WIM	USA	AUS	FRA	WIM	USA	AUS	FRA	WIM	USA	AUS	FRA	WIM	USA	AUS	FRA	WIM	USA
(Switzerland) **Roger Federer**	SF	**F**	QF	SF	**SF**	SF	W	QF	SF	QF	2R	4R	**SF**	4R	F	SF	3R	QF	F	F	SF	A	SF	A
(Spain) **Rafael Nadal**	QF	**W**	F	F	**F**	W	2R	A	A	W	1R	W	**F**	W	4R	A	QF	QF	2R	3R	1R	3R	A	4R

==== 2017–2022 ====
Player	2017				2018				2019				2020				2021				2022			
Player	AUS	FRA	WIM	USA	AUS	FRA	WIM	USA	AUS	FRA	WIM	USA	AUS	FRA	WIM	USA	AUS	FRA	WIM	USA	AUS	FRA	WIM	USA
(Switzerland) **Roger Federer**	**W**	A	W	QF	W	A	QF	4R	4R	**SF**	**F**	QF	SF	A	NH	A	A	4R	QF	A	A	A	A	A
(Spain) **Rafael Nadal**	**F**	W	4R	W	QF	W	SF	SF	F	**W**	**SF**	W	QF	W	NH	A	QF	SF	A	A	W	W	SF	4R

=== By age (end of season) ===
==== 17–21 ====
Player	17				18				19				20				21			
Player	AUS	FRA	WIM	USA	AUS	FRA	WIM	USA	AUS	FRA	WIM	USA	AUS	FRA	WIM	USA	AUS	FRA	WIM	USA
(Switzerland) **Roger Federer**	A	A	A	A	Q1	1R	1R	Q2	3R	4R	1R	3R	3R	QF	QF	4R	4R	1R	1R	4R
(Spain) **Rafael Nadal**	A	A	3R	2R	3R	A	A	2R	4R	**W**	2R	3R	A	**W**	**F**	QF	QF	**W**	**F**	4R

==== 22–26 ====
Player	22				23				24				25				26			
Player	AUS	FRA	WIM	USA	AUS	FRA	WIM	USA	AUS	FRA	WIM	USA	AUS	FRA	WIM	USA	AUS	FRA	WIM	USA
(Switzerland) **Roger Federer**	4R	1R	W	4R	W	3R	W	W	SF	**SF**	W	W	W	**F**	**W**	W	W	**F**	**W**	W
(Spain) **Rafael Nadal**	SF	**W**	**W**	SF	**W**	4R	A	SF	QF	W	W	W	QF	**W**	F	F	**F**	W	2R	A

==== 27–31 ====
Player	27				28				29				30				31			
Player	AUS	FRA	WIM	USA	AUS	FRA	WIM	USA	AUS	FRA	WIM	USA	AUS	FRA	WIM	USA	AUS	FRA	WIM	USA
(Switzerland) **Roger Federer**	SF	**F**	**F**	W	**F**	W	W	F	W	QF	QF	SF	SF	**F**	QF	SF	**SF**	SF	W	QF
(Spain) **Rafael Nadal**	A	W	1R	W	**F**	W	4R	A	QF	QF	2R	3R	1R	3R	A	4R	**F**	W	4R	W

==== 32–36 ====
Player	32				33				34				35				36			
Player	AUS	FRA	WIM	USA	AUS	FRA	WIM	USA	AUS	FRA	WIM	USA	AUS	FRA	WIM	USA	AUS	FRA	WIM	USA
(Switzerland) **Roger Federer**	SF	QF	2R	4R	**SF**	4R	F	SF	3R	QF	F	F	SF	A	SF	A	**W**	A	W	QF
(Spain) **Rafael Nadal**	QF	W	SF	SF	F	**W**	**SF**	W	QF	W	NH	A	QF	SF	A	A	W	W	SF	4R

==== 37–41 ====
Player	37				38				39				40				41			
Player	AUS	FRA	WIM	USA	AUS	FRA	WIM	USA	AUS	FRA	WIM	USA	AUS	FRA	WIM	USA	AUS	FRA	WIM	USA
(Switzerland) **Roger Federer**	W	A	QF	4R	4R	**SF**	**F**	QF	SF	A	NH	A	A	4R	QF	A	A	A	A	A
(Spain) **Rafael Nadal**	2R	A	A	A	A	1R	A	A	A	A	A	A	A							

=== ATP rankings ===
==== Year-end ranking timeline ====
Player	1998	1999	2000	2001	2002	2003	2004	2005	2006	2007	2008	2009	2010	2011	2012	2013	2014	2015	2016	2017	2018	2019	2020	2021	2022	2023	2024
(Switzerland) Roger Federer	301	64	29	13	6	2	**1**	**1**	**1**	**1**	2	**1**	2	3	2	6	2	3	16	2	3	3	5	16	–	–	–
(Spain) Rafael Nadal				811	200	49	51	2	2	2	**1**	2	**1**	2	4	**1**	3	5	9	**1**	2	**1**	2	6	2	670	153

==== ATP Year-end ranking timeline by age ====
Year-end ranking	15	16	17	18	19	20	21	22	23	24	25	26	27	28	29	30	31	32	33	34	35	36	37	38	39	40
(Switzerland) Roger Federer			301	64	29	13	6	2	**1**	**1**	**1**	**1**	2	**1**	2	3	2	6	2	3	16	2	3	3	5	16
(Spain) Rafael Nadal	811	200	49	51	2	2	2	**1**	2	**1**	2	4	**1**	3	5	9	**1**	2	**1**	2	6	2	670	153		

== Career evolution ==
Federer and Nadal were born just under four years and 10 months apart. Federer's birthday is 8 August 1981, while Nadal's is 3 June 1986. A different viewpoint of their career evolution is offered by taking the season they ended with an age of 16 as starting point, and comparing their accomplishments at the same age. For instance in 2006, Federer finished the season being 25 years old having accumulated a career record of nine Major titles, and ranked No. 1. By comparison, Nadal finished the 2011 season also aged 25, having accumulated ten Major titles in total, and being ranked No. 2. Federer played his last singles match in 2021, Nadal in 2024.

Age at end of season		17	18	19	20	21	22	23	24	25	26	27	28	29	30	31	32	33	34	35	36	37	38	39	40
(Switzerland) Federer's season		1998	1999	2000	2001	2002	2003	2004	2005	2006	2007	2008	2009	2010	2011	2012	2013	2014	2015	2016	2017	2018	2019	2020	2021
(Spain) Nadal's season		2003	2004	2005	2006	2007	2008	2009	2010	2011	2012	2013	2014	2015	2016	2017	2018	2019	2020	2021	2022	2023	2024	2025	2026
Grand Slam titles	Federer	0	0	0	0	0	1	4	6	9	12	13	15	16	16	17	17	17	17	17	19	20	20	20	20
Grand Slam titles	Nadal	0	0	1	2	3	5	6	9	10	11	13	14	14	14	16	17	19	20	20	22	22	22		
Grand Slam match wins	Federer	0	0	7	20	26	39	61	85	112	138	162	188	208	228	247	260	279	297	307	325	339	357	362	369
Grand Slam match wins	Nadal	0	6	19	36	56	80	95	120	143	157	171	187	198	203	226	247	271	282	291	313	314	314		
ATP Finals titles	Federer	0	0	0	0	0	1	2	2	3	4	4	4	5	6	6	6	6	6	6	6	6	6	6	6
ATP Finals titles	Nadal	0	0	0	0	0	0	0	0	0	0	0	0	0	0	0	0	0	0	0	0	0	0		
Masters 1000 titles	Federer	0	0	0	0	1	1	4	8	12	14	14	16	17	18	21	21	23	24	24	27	27	28	28	28
Masters 1000 titles	Nadal	0	0	4	6	9	12	15	18	19	21	26	27	27	28	30	33	35	35	36	36	36	36		
Total titles	Federer	0	0	0	1	4	11	22	33	45	53	57	61	66	70	76	77	82	88	88	95	99	103	103	103
Total titles	Nadal	0	1	12	17	23	31	36	43	46	50	60	64	67	69	75	80	84	86	88	92	92	92		
Total match wins	Federer	2	15	51	100	158	236	310	391	483	551	617	678	743	807	878	923	996	1059	1080	1134	1184	1237	1242	1251
Total match wins	Nadal	14	45	124	183	253	335	401	472	541	583	658	706	767	806	873	919	977	1004	1028	1067	1068	1080		
Ranking	Federer	301	64	29	13	6	2	1	1	1	1	2	1	2	3	2	6	2	3	16	2	3	3	5	16
Ranking	Nadal	49	51	2	2	2	1	2	1	2	4	1	3	5	9	1	2	1	2	6	2	670	153		
Weeks at number 1	Federer	0	0	0	0	0	0	48	100	152	204	237	262	285	285	302	302	302	302	302	302	310	310	310	310
Weeks at number 1	Nadal	0	0	0	0	0	19	46	76	102	102	115	141	141	141	160	196	205	209	209	209	209	209		

=== Titles by tournaments played comparison ===
Another way to view their respective careers and evolution is to look at the progression of titles won by the number of tournaments played to win each of their titles at each level of competition including Grand Slam tournaments, ATP Tour Masters 1000 (formerly ATP Masters Series), ATP Finals (formerly Tennis Masters Cup), Olympic Games, ATP Tour 500 Series (formerly ATP International Series Gold), and ATP Tour 250 Series (formerly ATP International Series). For example, Federer won his 20th Grand Slam title at his 72nd Grand Slam tournament, while Nadal won his 20th at his 60th Grand Slam tournament.

Singles title #		1	2	3	4	5	6	7	8	9	10	11	12	13	14	15	16	17	18	19	20	21	22	23	24	25	26	27	28	29	30	31	32	33	34	35	36	37
Federer	won at Grand Slam #	17	19	21	22	25	26	27	29	30	31	33	34	38	40	41	43	53	69	70	72																	
Nadal	won at Grand Slam #	6	9	13	17	18	20	24	25	26	28	32	34	36	38	48	50	52	56	58	60	63	64															
Federer	won at ATP Masters #	22	35	38	39	41	42	44	45	46	47	50	52	57	59	75	77	84	94	95	97	99	112	113	119	124	125	127	134									
Nadal	won at ATP Masters #	10	11	12	14	17	18	22	24	25	33	35	36	40	42	43	51	52	53	59	67	69	70	72	73	74	75	81	95	102	103	109	111	112	116	117	123	
Federer	won at ATP Finals #	2	3	5	6	9	10																															
Nadal	won at ATP Finals #																																					
Federer	won at Olympics #																																					
Nadal	won at Olympics #	1																																				
Federer	won at ATP 500 #	12	14	15	17	18	19	21	22	25	27	28	29	35	36	37	38	39	42	43	44	46	47	48	49													
Nadal	won at ATP 500 #	5	6	7	8	9	11	12	15	17	19	20	22	23	24	26	33	37	40	41	42	45	46	48														
Federer	won at ATP 250 #	23	30	40	41	42	45	46	47	48	49	50	51	52	53	54	55	56	57	62	63	66	69	70	71	75												
Nadal	won at ATP 250 #	11	18	21	22	30	40	41	44	45	49																											

== See also ==
- Big Three
- List of tennis rivalries
- Djokovic–Federer rivalry
- Djokovic–Nadal rivalry
- Federer–Murray rivalry
- Roger Federer career statistics
- List of career achievements by Roger Federer
- Rafael Nadal career statistics
- List of career achievements by Rafael Nadal
- List of Grand Slam men's singles champions
