= 2007 Wimbledon Championships – Men's singles final =

Wimbledon 2007 Men's Final
- (Switzerland) Roger Federer (1) vs. (Spain) Rafael Nadal (2)
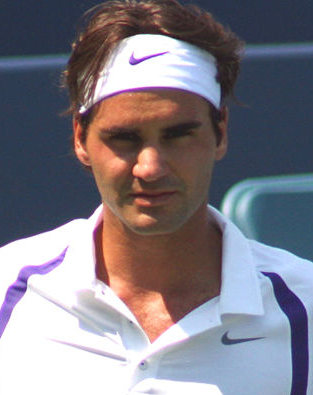
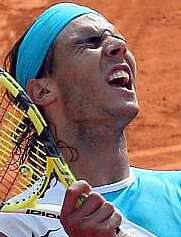
- Roger Federer (left) and Rafael Nadal (right)
Set	1	2	3	4	5
(Switzerland) Roger Federer	7^{9}	4	7^{7}	2	6
(Spain) Rafael Nadal	6^{7}	6	6^{3}	6	2
- Date: Sunday, 8 July 2007
- Tournament: The Championships, Wimbledon
- Location: Centre Court, All England Lawn Tennis and Croquet Club, Wimbledon, London
- Chair umpire: Carlos Ramos
- Duration: 3 hours 45 minutes
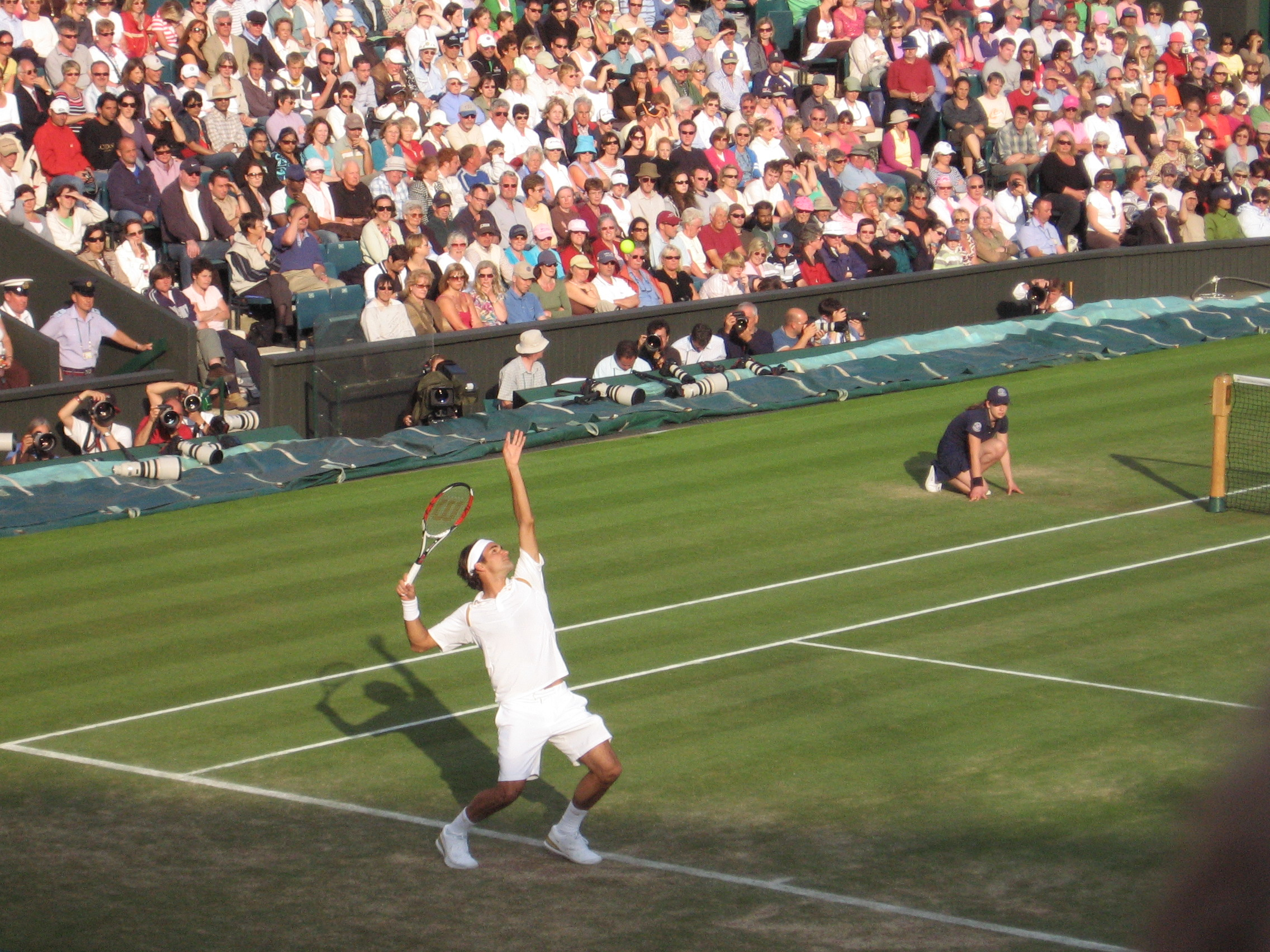
- Federer serves at the 2007 Championships

The 2007 Wimbledon Championships Men's Singles final was the championship tennis match of the men's singles tournament at the 2007 Wimbledon Championships. A part of the storied Federer–Nadal rivalry, it pitted the world No. 1 and defending champion Roger Federer against the world No. 2 Rafael Nadal. After 3 hours and 45 minutes, Federer defeated Nadal 7–6^{(9–7)}, 4–6, 7–6^{(7–3)}, 2–6, 6–2.

Upon its conclusion, it was almost universally praised as the greatest Wimbledon final since Borg–McEnroe in 1980.

== Background ==
Roger Federer and Rafael Nadal have a storied rivalry that is considered to be one of the greatest in tennis history. As they entered the 2007 Wimbledon Championships, the two men had collectively won the last nine consecutive Grand Slam titles.

The 2007 Wimbledon Men's Singles final was a rematch of the previous year's Championships final. Federer had won not only that match, but had also been the Wimbledon champion four years in a row and was on a quest of tying Björn Borg's record of five consecutive Wimbledon Championships.

Nadal, on the other hand, had just won the French Open for the third time in a row and was trying to achieve the rare French Open-Wimbledon double. Additionally, Nadal had denied Federer from completing the Career Grand Slam, and becoming the first man since 1968 to win all four Grand Slams consecutively.

The hype preceding the match was enormous because although Federer was the four-time defending champion, Nadal entered the match with an 8-4 lead in their head-to-head record.

== Match details ==
The chair umpire was Carlos Ramos of Portugal.

Federer leapt out to an early lead in the first set but it was decided in a memorable tiebreaker. Federer appeared to have won the set only to have the call reversed by the new review system Hawkeye. Federer would eventually win the first set 7–6. Nadal rebounded in the second set, breaking Federer in the final game to take the set 6–4.

Neither player could break through in the third set which saw twelve consecutive holds before Federer won the tiebreaker and seized the two sets to one advantage. Nadal shocked many by racing to a 4–0 lead in the fourth set, and after an injury time-out he closed out the set 6–2.

The final set was a dramatic affair with Nadal failing to convert four break points in the third and fifth games that would have given him an early lead. Federer proved too strong in the latter part of the set, breaking Nadal in the sixth and eighth games to close out the match.

== Statistics ==
Category	(Switzerland) Federer	(Spain) Nadal
1st Serve %	71%	70%
Aces	24	1
Double Faults	3	2
Winners	65	50
Unforced Errors	34	24
Winner-UFE	+31	+26
Winning % on 1st Serve	71%	68%
Winning % on 2nd Serve	62%	57%
Receiving Points Won	35%	31%
Break Point Conversions	3/8 (37%)	4/11 (36%)
Net Approaches Won	30/51 (59%)	18/26 (69%)
Total Points Won	165	158

_{Source}

== Significance ==
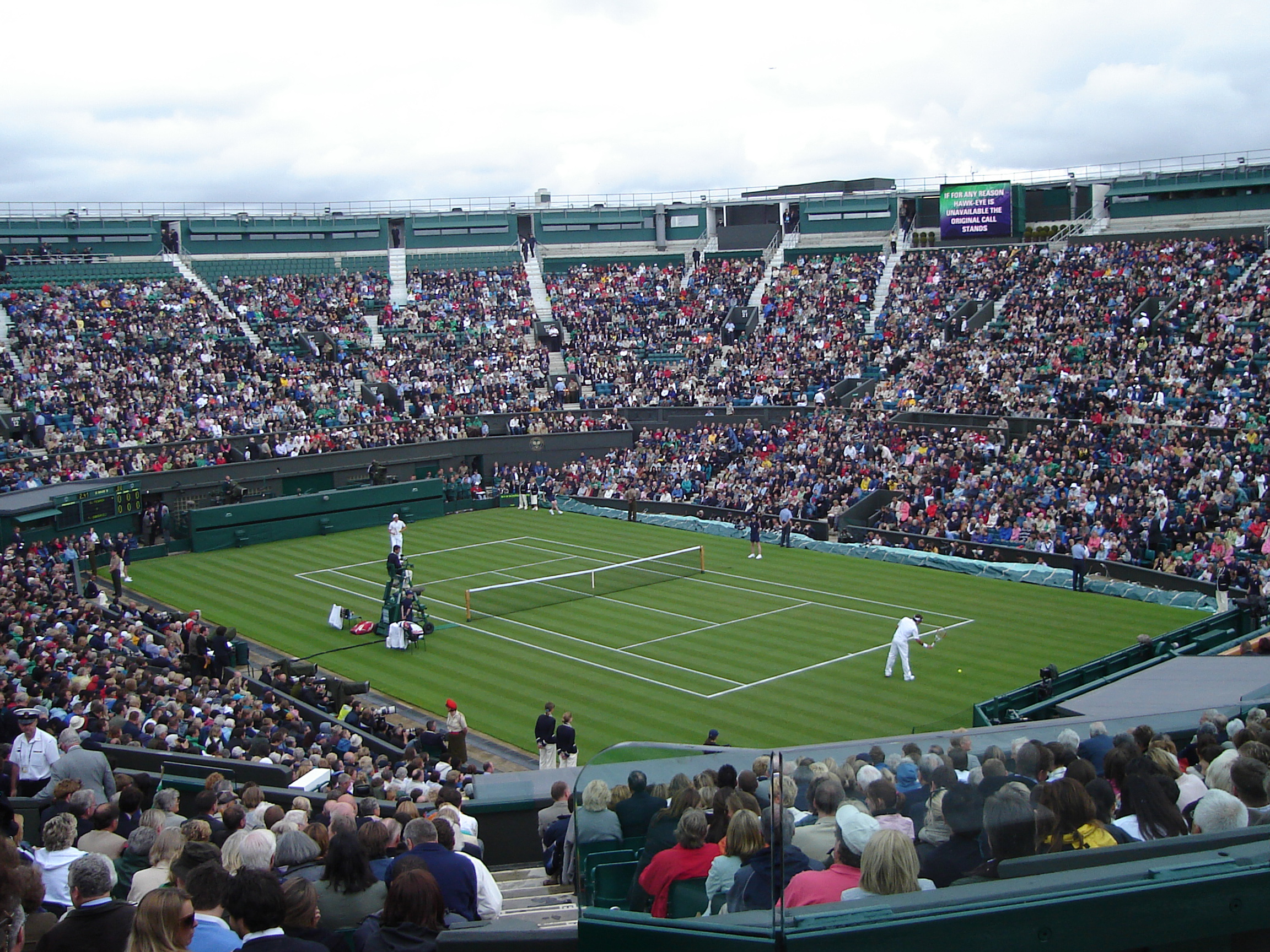
A roofless Centre Court in the early stages of redevelopment.

This match was historic as it saw Federer equal Björn Borg's Open Era record of five consecutive Wimbledon Championships. Due to this potential Borg returned to the All England Club for the first time in many years to witness the Wimbledon final. The victory also equalled Federer with Borg and Rod Laver with 11 Grand Slam championships, leaving him only three behind Pete Sampras in his quest to achieve the all-time record.

This was the first Wimbledon final to use the replay technology system Hawk-Eye. The system proved controversial reversing a set point for Federer in the first set. In the fourth set Federer grew frustrated with almost all of the reviews going Nadal's way and asked the umpire to turn it off saying, "it's killing me today."

This was also the first time that Federer or Nadal had ever played a fifth set in a Grand Slam final. They would go on to also play five sets in the final the following year, which Nadal won in what many consider the greatest match of all time. Nadal would also beat Federer in five sets at the 2009 Australian Open, and Federer would beat Nadal in five sets in the final of the 2017 Australian Open.

Due to construction of a new retractable roof, this was the only Wimbledon final played without the upper facade which had been removed.
