= Match for Africa =

Set of tennis exhibition matches

Poster for the Match for Africa

The Match for Africa series is a recurring set of tennis exhibition matches. They are organized by Swiss player Roger Federer to raise money for the Roger Federer Foundation. In the exhibition, Federer competes in a singles match against another of the world's best tennis players who have also been ranked in the Top 10 by the Association of Tennis Professionals (ATP). Each match has raised over $1,000,000 in support of educational and athletic programs for children in Africa.

The first Match for Africa was held in Federer's native Switzerland against his biggest rival, Rafael Nadal. It was also paired with another charity exhibition match played in Nadal's native Spain and titled Joining Forces for the Benefit of Children. Beginning with the Match for Africa 4, the players have also taken part in a doubles match where they each partner with a celebrity. Federer has partnered with Bill Gates in both such matches. The 2020 edition, contested by Federer and Nadal at the Cape Town Stadium, attracted 51,954 spectators, setting the record for the highest ever attendance at a tennis match.

== Match for Africa ==
"Match for Africa" was a tennis exhibition match played on 21 December 2010. The match was contested between world No. 1 player Rafael Nadal and world No. 2 Roger Federer at the Hallenstadion in Zurich, Switzerland. It was played to benefit the Roger Federer Foundation, which raises money to fund schooling, transport and food for children in Africa. It was the first of two exhibition matches contested by the players in the space of two days, with a match being hosted at the Caja Mágica in Madrid in Nadal's home county, Spain the following day. The match in Madrid was for the benefit of Nadal's foundation, the Fundación Rafa Nadal, and the match was titled "Joining Forces for the Benefit of Children".

Demand for the event at the Hallenstadion was high, with the 10,500 tickets being sold out within minutes of going on sale in September 2010. The match was won by home-favourite Federer in three sets, with a 4–6, 6–3, 6–3 scoreline. The second match in Madrid was won by Nadal 7–6^{(7–3)}, 4–6, 6–1.

The matches raised nearly $4 million for charity, with $2.5 million going to the Roger Federer Foundation and $1.3 million to Fundación Rafa Nadal; with more to come in for Nadal's charity as segments of the court were sold from the Madrid match.

Match for Africa 1 - Switzerland Match
1	(Spain) Rafael Nadal	4	6	3
2	(Switzerland) Roger Federer	6	3	6

Match for Africa 1 - Spain Match
1	(Spain) Rafael Nadal	7^{7}	4	6
2	(Switzerland) Roger Federer	6^{3}	6	1

== Match for Africa 2 ==
"Match for Africa 2" was a second exhibition match to raise money for the Roger Federer Foundation. The match was played on 21 December 2014 in an again sold out Hallenstadion in Zurich, Switzerland. This time the match was contested between the World Number 2 player Roger Federer and World Number 4 Stan Wawrinka. The match was won by Federer 7–6^{(7–4)}, 6–4. This exhibition raised £850,000 for education projects in southern Africa.

Match for Africa 2
1	(Switzerland) Roger Federer	7^{7}	6
2	(Switzerland) Stan Wawrinka	6^{4}	4

== Match for Africa 3 ==
"Match for Africa 3" was an exhibition match organized to raise funds for the Roger Federer Foundation. Initially scheduled for November 2016, the match was postponed to 10 April 2017 in Zurich, Switzerland, due to Roger Federer's knee injury.The match was contested between the world No.4 Roger Federer and world No.1 Andy Murray. The match was won by Federer 6–3, 7–6^{(8–6)}. The match raised 1.4 million Suisse francs through the conclusion of the match with another week of donations still to come.

Match for Africa 3
1	(Switzerland) Roger Federer	6	7
2	(United Kingdom) Andy Murray	3	6

== Match for Africa 4 ==
"Match for Africa 4" was a fourth exhibition event to raise money for the Roger Federer Foundation. The matches were played on 29 April 2017 at KeyArena in Seattle, United States. The doubles match was contested between Roger Federer and Bill Gates versus John Isner and Mike McCready of Pearl Jam, and was won by Federer/Gates 6–4. The singles match between Federer and Isner was then contested and it was won by Federer 6–4, 7–6^{(9–7)}. The event was sponsored by Microsoft, Nike, Starbucks, and Rolex and raised more than $2,000,000.

Match for Africa 4 Doubles
1	(Switzerland) Roger Federer (United States) Bill Gates	6
2	(United States) John Isner (United States) Mike McCready	4

Match for Africa 4 Singles
1	(Switzerland) Roger Federer	6	7^{9}
2	(United States) John Isner	4	6^{7}

== Match for Africa 5 ==
Marketed as the "Match for Africa 5: Silicon Valley" was the fifth exhibition event to raise money for the Roger Federer Foundation. The matches were played on 5 March 2018, in San Jose, United States. The doubles were contested between Roger Federer and Bill Gates versus Jack Sock and Savannah Guthrie of NBC News, which were won 6-3 by Gates and Federer. The singles match between Federer and Sock followed, with Federer claiming the victory with 7-6 6–4.

Match for Africa 5 Doubles
1	(Switzerland) Roger Federer (United States) Bill Gates	6
2	(United States) Jack Sock (United States) Savannah Guthrie	3

Match for Africa 5
1	(Switzerland) Roger Federer	7	6
2	(United States) Jack Sock	6	4

== Match in Africa 6 ==
The sixth edition took place on 7 February 2020 in Cape Town, South Africa and featured Roger Federer and Rafael Nadal. Federer confirmed the date, location, and opponent during the 2019 edition of Wimbledon. Federer said he had pursued Nadal's participation for two years before a date as agreed upon. South Africa is the birth country of Federer's mother and the focus of his charitable foundation, as Federer is also a South African citizen. The doubles match consisted Roger Federer and Bill Gates versus Rafael Nadal and Trevor Noah, host of The Daily Show. Federer and Gates won the match 6–3. In singles, Federer beat Nadal with the score 6–4, 3–6, 6–3. The event was attended by 51,954 people, the highest attendance ever recorded at a tennis match. More than $3.5 million was raised in aid of children's education in Africa.

Match in Africa 6 Doubles
1	(Switzerland) Roger Federer (United States) Bill Gates	6
2	(Spain) Rafael Nadal (South Africa) Trevor Noah	3

Match in Africa 6 Singles
1	(Spain) Rafael Nadal	4	6	3
2	(Switzerland) Roger Federer	6	3	6

== Results ==
=== Singles ===
Date	Tournament	Surface	Winner	Runner-up	Score
Dec 2010	Match for Africa, Zurich, Switzerland	Hard (i)	(Switzerland) Roger Federer	(Spain) Rafael Nadal	4–6, 6–3, 6–3
Dec 2010	Joining Forces for the Benefit of Children, Madrid, Spain	Clay (i)	(Spain) Rafael Nadal	(Switzerland) Roger Federer	7–6^{(7–3)}, 4–6, 6–1
Dec 2014	Match for Africa 2, Zurich, Switzerland	Hard (i)	(Switzerland) Roger Federer	(Switzerland) Stan Wawrinka	7–6^{(7–4)}, 6–4
Apr 2017	Match for Africa 3, Zurich, Switzerland	Hard (i)	(Switzerland) Roger Federer	(United Kingdom) Andy Murray	6–3, 7–6^{(8–6)}
Apr 2017	Match for Africa 4, Seattle, United States	Hard (i)	(Switzerland) Roger Federer	(United States) John Isner	6–4, 7–6^{(9–7)}
Mar 2018	Match for Africa 5, San Jose, United States	Hard (i)	(Switzerland) Roger Federer	(United States) Jack Sock	7–6^{(11–9)}, 6–4
Feb 2020	Match in Africa 6, Cape Town, South Africa	Hard (o)	(Switzerland) Roger Federer	(Spain) Rafael Nadal	6–4, 3–6, 6–3

=== Doubles ===
Date	Tournament	Surface	Winners	Runners-up	Score
Apr 2017	Match for Africa 4, Seattle, United States	Hard (i)	(Switzerland) Roger Federer (United States) Bill Gates	(United States) John Isner (United States) Mike McCready	6–4
Mar 2018	Match for Africa 5, San Jose, United States	Hard (i)	(Switzerland) Roger Federer (United States) Bill Gates	(United States) Jack Sock (United States) Savannah Guthrie	6–3
Feb 2020	Match in Africa 6, Cape Town, South Africa	Hard (o)	(Switzerland) Roger Federer (United States) Bill Gates	(Spain) Rafael Nadal (South Africa) Trevor Noah	6–3
