= The Roger Federer Foundation =

Swiss charitable organisation

Federer Foundation
- Formation: 2003
- Founder: Roger Federer
- Type: Charitable foundation
- Purpose: Early childhood education, basic education, sustainable development
- Headquarters: Zürich, Switzerland
- Region served: Southern Africa and Switzerland
- Key people: Roger Federer (President); Maya Ziswiler (Chief Executive Officer)
- Website: https://federerfoundation.org/

The Federer Foundation is a Swiss charitable organisation established by former tennis professional Roger Federer. Its aim is to improve access to quality early learning and basic education for children in six countries in Southern Africa and also in Switzerland.

== History ==
The foundation was established in 2003 in Switzerland as a philanthropic vehicle for Federer's charitable activities.

Its mission focuses on providing education to disadvantaged children, with a long-term emphasis on sustainability and local ownership.

In April 2026, the Roger Federer Foundation changed its name to the Federer Foundation as part of the launch of its 2026 - 2030 strategy.

== Leadership ==
In 2025, the organisation appointed Maya Ziswiler as Chief Executive Officer, succeeding Dr Janine Händel, who led the foundation since 2010. Roger Federer is a trustee and its President.

== Activities ==
Since 2003, the foundation has financed education programmes and teacher-training initiatives in African countries — Lesotho, Malawi, Namibia, South Africa, Zambia and Zimbabwe — as well as projects in Switzerland.

Its work has included the School Readiness Initiative, which focused on early learning and school readiness. Since April 2026, the foundation's focus has expanded to early and foundational learning.

By the end of 2025, the foundation reported having reached 3.82 million children since 2003, supported 72,076 teachers through training, and strengthened 18,445 educational institutions.

The foundation’s strategy emphasises collaboration with local partners, capacity-building and evidence-based planning. It typically commits to long-term partnerships rather than one-off grants, aiming to improve educational outcomes in a sustainable way.

In 2022, following Russia's invasion of Ukraine, the foundation made a donation of $500,000 to War Child Holland to secure access to education for Ukrainian children.
