= 2017 Australian Open – Men's singles final =

Tennis match

2017 Australian Open Men's Final
- (Switzerland) Roger Federer (17) vs. (Spain) Rafael Nadal (9)
| Set | 1 | 2 | 3 | 4 | 5 |
|---|---|---|---|---|---|
| (Switzerland) Roger Federer | 6 | 3 | 6 | 3 | 6 |
| (Spain) Rafael Nadal | 4 | 6 | 1 | 6 | 3 |
- Date: 29 January 2017
- Tournament: Australian Open
- Location: Melbourne, Australia
- Chair umpire: James Keothavong
- Duration: 3 hours 38 minutes

The 2017 Australian Open Men's Singles final was the championship tennis match of the Men's Singles tournament at the 2017 Australian Open. Highly regarded as one of the greatest matches in tennis history, it was contested between Roger Federer and Rafael Nadal, ranked 17th and 9th in the world respectively. It was their record ninth and final meeting in a Grand Slam final in their rivalry, and their first meeting in a Grand Slam final since the 2011 French Open. In a rematch of the 2009 Australian Open final, which Nadal won in five sets, Federer won the duel in five sets, beating Nadal for the first time in a Grand Slam since the 2007 Wimbledon final. He also trailed Nadal 3–1 in the final set but won five games in a row to win the title. This ended a six-match losing streak against Nadal in Grand Slam events. Having lost their previous three encounters, this was the first and only time Federer defeated Nadal at the Australian Open and also marked Federer's first Grand Slam victory over Nadal outside the grass courts of Wimbledon. Federer extended his record of Grand Slam singles titles to 18.

Due to their rivalry, the age of both players, its relevance in popular and critical discussions regarding either players' claim as the 'greatest player of all time' and other implications towards their legacies, and speculation of the match being Federer and Nadal's last final contest against one another, the match, referred by the moniker 'Fedal XXXV', was considered a 'dream final'. The quality of the performances by both players during the match led to it being dubbed at the time one of the most important sporting events ever played, as well as one of the greatest tennis matches of all time.

== Background ==
Federer and Nadal's participation in this tournament marked their major returns from their 2016 seasons that saw sidelining injuries. Federer, in particular, had not played a tournament since the 2016 Wimbledon semi-final, having aggravated his surgically repaired knee to the extent that he called off the rest of his 2016 season, including missing out the 2016 Summer Olympics in Rio that he was keen to compete in for the singles gold medal that eluded him and also playing the highly anticipated mixed doubles pairing with compatriot and fellow tennis great, Martina Hingis. Unable to defend his Cincinnati Open and Swiss Basel Indoors titles and his runner up position at the 2015 Wimbledon and US Open, Federer fell from No. 3 to No. 16 at the end of the 2016, dropping out of the top 5 for the first time since March 2014 and dropping out of the top 10 rankings for the first time since 2002. Contrasting Federer's consistent semi-finals and finals appearances in Grand Slams from 2015 Wimbledon onwards, Nadal failed to make a Grand Slam quarter-final since the 2015 French Open. His last Grand Slam title win was the 2014 French Open, and his last appearance in the Australian Open singles final was against Stan Wawrinka in 2014, which he lost in four sets. Nadal, however, won the Monte-Carlo Masters title in 2016, while Federer, for the first time since 2000, did not win a tournament title. Before this tournament, Nadal had reached the quarter-finals of the 2017 Brisbane International, losing to Milos Raonic, while Federer had played in the 2017 Hopman Cup in singles and mixed round robins with Belinda Bencic, winning two and losing one match in both singles and mixed doubles (the Swiss team did not qualify for the final).

En route to the final, both Federer and Nadal made exceptional campaigns. Federer scored three wins against top-10 seeded players, including a five-set win over Kei Nishikori in the fourth round, which became Federer's 200th win over top-10 players in his career and becoming the first man ever to achieve this feat, and culminating in a gutsy five-set win in the semi-finals over compatriot Stan Wawrinka after surviving several break points in the fifth. Nadal meanwhile scored two top-10 wins, as well as ending Grigor Dimitrov's unbeaten 2017 win streak of ten matches in the semi-finals in a gruelling five-set match that lasted 4 hours and 56 minutes; during the final set, Nadal was in trouble being down 3–4, 15–40, but managed to recover to defeat the Bulgarian in what up until that point was the best match of the tournament. When top seeds Andy Murray and Novak Djokovic were surprisingly knocked out early in the draw, a final between Federer and Nadal was anticipated early due to the two men being on opposite sides of the draw.

== Build-up ==
Federer's entry in this tournament already drew substantial and critical media attention due to his 6-month layoff from his knee injury, his continued years-long quest for his 18th singles major, and his consistent form and reflected appearances in two semi-finals and two finals in four previous Grand Slam tournaments despite his advancing age. The final between Federer and Nadal further developed from that attention and the match was immediately regarded by fans, fellow tennis contemporaries, pundits and analysts, and the media as a 'dream final' and, more importantly, a match of historical significance for both players, as agreed by many past legends such as Andy Roddick and Pam Shriver as well as renowned tennis analyst Mary Carillo. Due to their respective ages of 35 and 30, the increasing number of years since their last respective Grand Slam title wins, and the perceived declines from their prime years which saw some critics voicing opinions that neither player would ever win a singles major again, it was critically speculated that this tournament final may mark the last time that Federer and Nadal would meet and contest each other in a Grand Slam final. Furthermore, many other pundits and analysts also agreed that this match could very well prove who between Federer and Nadal would be popularly and critically viewed as the "greatest tennis player of all time". Federer held the all-time count of Grand Slam singles titles at 17, while Nadal held the second all-time count of 14 tied with Pete Sampras and a dominant head-to-head 23–11 record against Federer. This final would either see Federer breaking his historic all-time record of 17 Grand Slam singles titles, or Nadal winning his 15th Grand Slam singles title which would break the tie between himself and Sampras' Grand Slam title count and subsequently narrow the Grand Slam title count gap between himself and Federer. Furthermore, should Nadal win, he would become the first man in the Open Era to achieve a double career Grand Slam, winning each of the Grand Slams at least twice in men's singles.

Numerous tennis players and legends voiced their opinions on the match and who would win, including Australian Open promotional interviews with Roy Emerson, Fred Stolle, John McEnroe, Lindsay Davenport, and Rod Laver, in addition to other media interviews with John Newcombe, Martina Navratilova, Lleyton Hewitt, Pat Rafter, Michael Chang, Mary Joe Fernández, and Andy Roddick. Federer's age, his last two disappointing four-set losses in Grand Slam tournament finals, his first tournament return from his six-month layoff and the fact that he had played two five set matches in the last 7 days at the age of 35 were all collectively cited against Federer's chances for winning the final, in addition to the popularly cited Nadal's dominant head-to-head record (including 3-0 against Federer in their previous Australian Open matches), and particular match-up against Federer's game. Players remarked that the court speed would favour Federer's game over Nadal's, and the media noted that Federer's game might be further helped by the courts being comparatively faster than the previous year's Australian Open, but this remains disputed. Further adding to Federer's chances to winning were their last encounter ending in Federer's favour at the 2015 Swiss Basel Indoors, the fact that, despite having played two five-set matches in the past week, Federer had had an additional day of rest compared to Nadal who had recently won his intensely contested five-set semi-final match against Grigor Dimitrov which lasted almost five hours, but most importantly, a noticeably improved and more aggressive backhand that might hold up better against Nadal's high-spinning forehand.

== Match ==
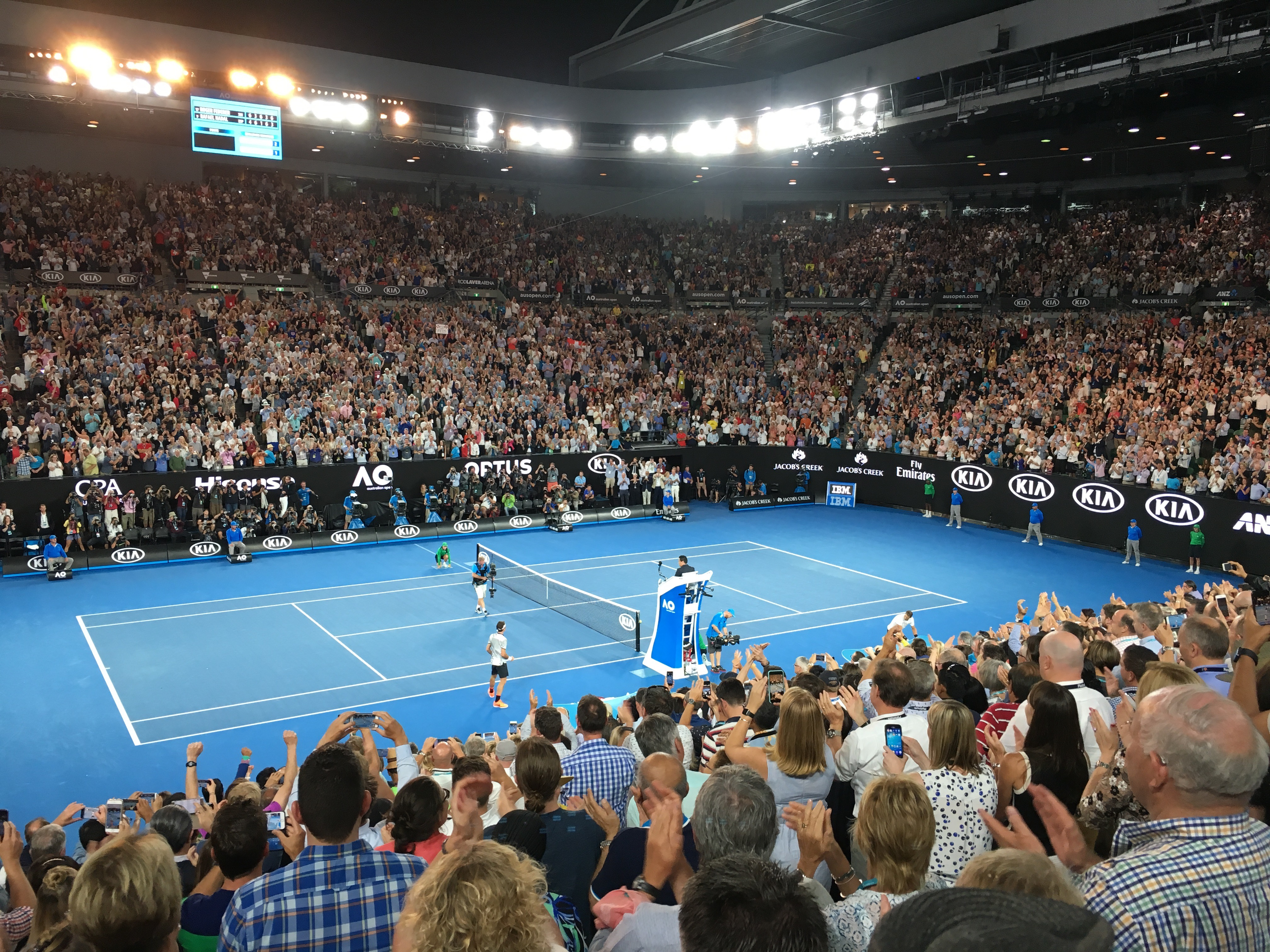
Federer and Nadal moments after championship point

James Keothavong of the UK was the chair umpire.

The match lasted 3 hours 38 minutes including a medical time-out for Federer after the fourth set. Federer won the first set 6–4 after breaking Nadal in the seventh game. Nadal won the second set 6–3 where he broke Federer twice, and Federer broke back once. The start of the third set saw a crucial momentum swing, where Federer saved three break points in his opening service game, all of which were saved by aces. After holding on to his serve, Federer subsequently broke Nadal twice to take the set 6–1. The fourth set was won by Nadal 6–3, and it came down to a fifth set.

Federer took an off-court medical time-out at the start of the fifth set. Upon resumption of play, Nadal broke Federer in the first game and was leading the final set 3–1. Federer, however, would prove to be too strong for Nadal afterwards. He broke back to level the set at 3–3. After holding his serve to take the lead 4–3, Federer went on to break Nadal's next service game, which included a 26-shot rally (the longest in the match) at deuce that featured incredible shots from both players that drew a standing ovation from the crowd that lasted nearly a full minute. Whilst serving for the championship at 5–3, Federer had to overcome a 15–40 deficit to reach championship point. On his second championship point, Federer hit a forehand winner that landed on the line of the alley on the deuce side. Nadal challenged the call, but, upon a Hawk-Eye review, the call was upheld, and Federer won the match.

== Statistics ==
The match statistics followed a similar pattern to those at the 2009 Australian Open final, with a few exceptions: Federer had a higher break point conversion rate than Nadal, while Nadal won a higher percentage of points at the net.

The most striking difference between this match and past Fedal Slam finals is that Federer hit more than double the number of winners than Nadal, 73 to 35.

| Category | (Switzerland) Federer | (Spain) Nadal |
|---|---|---|
| 1st serve % | 85 of 138 = 62% | 110 of 151 = 73% |
| Winning % on 1st serve | 65 of 85 = 76% | 69 of 110 = 63% |
| Winning % on 2nd serve | 26 of 53 = 49% | 23 of 41 = 56% |
| Aces | 20 | 4 |
| Double faults | 3 | 3 |
| Winners | 73 | 35 |
| Unforced errors | 57 | 28 |
| Winners-UFE | +16 | +7 |
| Forehand winners | 28 | 20 |
| Backhand winners | 14 | 9 |
| Receiving points won | 59 of 151 = 39% | 47 of 138 = 34% |
| Break point conversions | 6 of 20 = 30% | 4 of 17 = 24% |
| Net approaches | 29 of 40 = 73% | 10 of 12 = 83% |
| Fastest serve | 207 km/h | 200 km/h |
| Average 1st serve speed | 185 km/h | 177 km/h |
| Average 2nd serve speed | 147 km/h | 150 km/h |
| Total points won | 150 of 289 = 52% | 139 of 289 = 48% |

_{Source}

== Significance ==
Winning his fifth Australian Open title, Federer extended his all-time record of Grand Slam titles to 18, pulling four ahead of the second all-time count of 14 held by Nadal and Pete Sampras. Federer also became the first man ever to win at least five singles at three different Grand Slams each (Australian Open, Wimbledon, and US Open). In addition to being denied his third effort to win the Australian Open title, Nadal was also denied, for the second time after the 2014 Australian Open final, from becoming the first man to achieve a double career Grand Slam in the Open Era. Furthermore, Federer's victory was his first Grand Slam match win over Nadal since the 2007 Wimbledon final nearly a decade earlier, and also marked Federer's first-ever win over Nadal in a Grand Slam match outside of the grass courts of Wimbledon. Most importantly, Federer's victory marked the culmination of his years-long quest since his 2012 Wimbledon win for his 18th Grand Slam singles title, which previously saw three finals appearances and losses all to then-reigning No. 1 Novak Djokovic at the 2014 Wimbledon, 2015 Wimbledon and the 2015 US Open. At 35 years and 174 days of age, Federer became the second-oldest winner of a Grand Slam after Ken Rosewall since 1972. Considered altogether along with his return from his six-month injury layoff, his 2017 Australian Open run seeing three five-set match wins over the top ten players, and his Grand Slam match history of losses against Nadal, Federer's victory from being down 1–3 in the final set against Nadal is considered by some to be the biggest win in his career.

Federer's fifth Australian Open title win marked a tournament-record seven-year-long gap between a player's successive Australian Open titles and also established an Open-era Slam record of a 13+ year-long span of winning men's singles Grand Slam titles since his maiden 2003 Wimbledon title win. Winning another Australian Open title also saw Federer increase his all-time record count of hard court singles majors to ten, two ahead of the second all-time count of eight held by Novak Djokovic. In addition, the match was also Federer's career seventh five-set Grand Slam final match, subsequently breaking the all-time career record tie held with Björn Borg of six Grand Slam five-set finals.

Federer's winning campaign included defeating four top 10 players, three of which went to a fifth set and two of them were back-to-back: fifth seed Kei Nishikori in the fourth round; fourth seed Stan Wawrinka in the semi-final; and ninth seed Nadal in the final. This particular feat was last achieved 35 years ago by the unseeded 17 year-old Mats Wilander at the 1982 French Open. The 2017 Australian Open final also marked Federer's 100th Australian Open match. The victory catapulted Federer back into the top 10 rankings at No. 10, while Nadal's runner-up position advanced his rank from No. 9 to No. 6.

Nadal and Federer would continue their resurgent form throughout the season, each winning two of the four majors (Federer winning a record eighth Wimbledon title, Nadal a record 10th French Open and a third US Open) and finishing as world number one and two respectively. Federer, however, won all four matches between the two during the season, including a fourth-round encounter at Indian Wells and two further finals at the Masters 1000 series events in Miami and Shanghai.

== Viewership ==
The match was one of the most-watched tennis matches in history. Eurosport's coverage of the event reached 9.7 million viewers across Europe, becoming its most-watched tennis match of all-time and the second most-watched sports event in Eurosport’s history, averaging 7.2 million viewers through the match's duration and peaking at 8 million viewers during the final set. Eurosport's coverage of the final also broke local records receiving the highest ever amount of average viewers for a Eurosport programme in the Netherlands with 503,000 viewers and in Spain with 610,000 viewers.

In Australia, the free-to-air television broadcast on the Seven Network was the highest-rating Australian Open Men's Singles Final in more than a decade, with a combined 2.668 million viewers in Sydney, Melbourne, Brisbane, Adelaide & Perth. Including regional viewers (965,000), the figure rose to 3.615 million viewers across Australia. A one-minute period peaked at 4.4 million viewers across Australia. Across the final day of the tournament, 6.5 million Australians watched at least five consecutive minutes of the broadcast. In addition, the match was streamed online in Australia by nearly 190,000 people. The Seven Network had a free-to-air audience share of 54.5% between 6:00 PM and 12:00 AM.

In the United States, ESPN said the men’s final drew a record audience since it moved to an overnight time slot in 2005. Starting at 3:30 AM ET Sunday, the five-set match posted a 0.9 overnight rating (~1.05 million households), up 80% from the 2016 final between Novak Djokovic and Andy Murray. The network said it likely would be the most-watched program at that hour in ESPN history.

== Reactions ==
Joining the social media congratulations and praise from fans, commentators, fellow contemporaries and tennis legends such as Billie Jean King who praised Federer as the greatest of all time, were other sport stars and legends outside of tennis such as Mesut Özil, Ian Thorpe, Alex Morgan, Sachin Tendulkar, Pau Gasol, Luís Figo, Franco Baresi, Karrie Webb, Lin Dan, and Usain Bolt. Golf legend 'Golden Bear' Jack Nicklaus, who holds the all-time record of golf majors at the same number of 18, also offered his congratulations to Federer for winning his 18th major tennis singles win.

Commentators contributed their post-match thoughts. Brad Gilbert said to his fellow commentators Chris McKendry and Darren Cahill that he could easily make a case that Federer, being 1-3 down to his archrival Nadal in the final deciding set, would go on to play the best five games in his career, coming up the most clutch that he has ever been, especially in the face of Nadal and everything that was on line in losing this match to him. Patrick McEnroe of ESPN said that Federer 'out-Rafa'd Rafa', noting that, instead of being emotionally and physically depleted from being grounded down by Nadal's persistence and tenacity, Federer this time around was 'the fighter. . . that was defending, that was scrapping, was coming up with shots on the run' that, coupled with his serve, saw him close the gap between himself and Nadal and then go on to win the deciding set of the match. John McEnroe remarked that Nadal's long semi-final and the one day of difference of rest between him and Federer perhaps made themselves felt in the latter stages of the match. But John McEnroe, who himself in the past was one of the critics who judged that Federer would never again win another major after his 2012 Wimbledon title win, remarked that during the match's final set Federer 'showed more heart and will than he ever has in a singles match in his life,' which led to Federer's victory that in John McEnroe's eyes cemented Federer as being the best player of all time unless Nadal can win additional majors to once again close the gap between their respective Grand Slam singles title count. Due to the form shown by both players, both McEnroe brothers say that Federer and Nadal could very well win at their respective most successful Slams of Wimbledon and the French Open ahead. This prediction proved out to be correct, as later in the year Nadal and Federer, won French Open and Wimbledon respectively, both without dropping a set. Nadal also won the US Open later the same year. In 2018, Federer successfully defended his Australian Open title, defeating finalist Marin Čilić in five sets as well as Nadal successfully defended his French Open title, defeating finalist Thiem in three sets.

Pat Cash criticized Federer's 'lengthy break' after the 4th set due to a medical time-out, accusing him of "legal" cheating and criticized the tournament for allowing Federer to do so. In response, Federer said that Cash was unfair and exaggerating in his criticism, elaborating that his quad and groin began to hurt through the second and third sets respectively and finally warranted a medical time-out after the end of the fourth set. Further defending his integrity, Federer said that he was the last guy to take a medical time-out, much less abuse it, citing his 20-year career of having not called a medical time-out prior to the 2017 Australian Open. When asked in the post-match conference for his thoughts, Nadal was indifferent, "[having] no opinion and didn't know what was going on". Nadal himself had taken a brief break in which he went to the dressing room and returned to court in fresh clothes. As precedence, Nadal also took a time-out in the 2014 final against Stan Wawrinka when he was behind, and came back to play better and win the third set in that final following the break. Nadal's uncle and coach, Toni Nadal, also believed that Federer's medical time out was not called to secure an advantage from stopping the match's rhythm and pace.

== See also ==
- 2008 Wimbledon Championships – Men's singles final
- 2009 Australian Open – Men's singles final
- 2009 French Open – Men's singles final
- 2009 Wimbledon Championships – Men's singles final
- 2009 US Open – Men's singles final
- 2012 Australian Open – Men's singles final
- 2019 Wimbledon Championships – Men's singles final
