= 2017 Australian Open =

- Date: 16–29 January 2017
- Edition: 105th
- Category: Grand Slam
- Draw: 128S / 64D /
- Prize money: A$ 50,000,000
- Surface: Hard (Plexicushion)
- Location: Melbourne, Australia
- Venue: Melbourne Park
- Attendance: 728,763

Champions

Men's singles
- (Switzerland) Roger Federer

Women's singles
- (United States) Serena Williams

Men's doubles
- (Finland) Henri Kontinen / (Australia) John Peers

Women's doubles
- (United States) Bethanie Mattek-Sands / (Czech Republic) Lucie Šafářová

Mixed doubles
- (United States) Abigail Spears / (Colombia) Juan Sebastián Cabal

Wheelchair men's singles
- (Argentina) Gustavo Fernández

Wheelchair women's singles
- (Japan) Yui Kamiji

Wheelchair quad singles
- (Australia) Dylan Alcott

Wheelchair men's doubles
- (Belgium) Joachim Gérard / (United Kingdom) Gordon Reid

Wheelchair women's doubles
- (Netherlands) Jiske Griffioen / (Netherlands) Aniek van Koot

Wheelchair quad doubles
- (United Kingdom) Andrew Lapthorne / (United States) David Wagner

Boys' singles
- (Hungary) Zsombor Piros

Girls' singles
- (Ukraine) Marta Kostyuk

Boys' doubles
- (Chinese Taipei) Hsu Yu-hsiou / (China) Zhao Lingxi

Girls' doubles
- (Canada) Bianca Andreescu / (United States) Carson Branstine
- Australian Open

The 2017 Australian Open was a tennis tournament that took place at Melbourne Park between 16 and 29 January 2017. It was the 105th edition of the Australian Open, and the first Grand Slam tournament of the year. The tournament consisted of events for professional players in singles, doubles and mixed doubles play. Junior and wheelchair players competed in singles and doubles tournaments. As in previous years, the tournament's title sponsor was Kia.

Novak Djokovic and Angelique Kerber were the defending champions and both were unsuccessful in their title defence; they lost to Denis Istomin and CoCo Vandeweghe in the second and fourth rounds, respectively. For the first time since the 2004 French Open, both No. 1 seeds lost before the quarterfinals, with both Andy Murray and Kerber defeated in the fourth round.

Roger Federer won his eighteenth men's singles Grand Slam title by defeating Rafael Nadal in a five-set final. It was his first major title since 2012 Wimbledon and a rematch of the 2009 Australian Open final, which Nadal won in five sets. Serena Williams overcame her sister Venus in the women's singles final, surpassing Steffi Graf to become the player with the most major wins in the women's game in the Open Era.

== Tournament ==
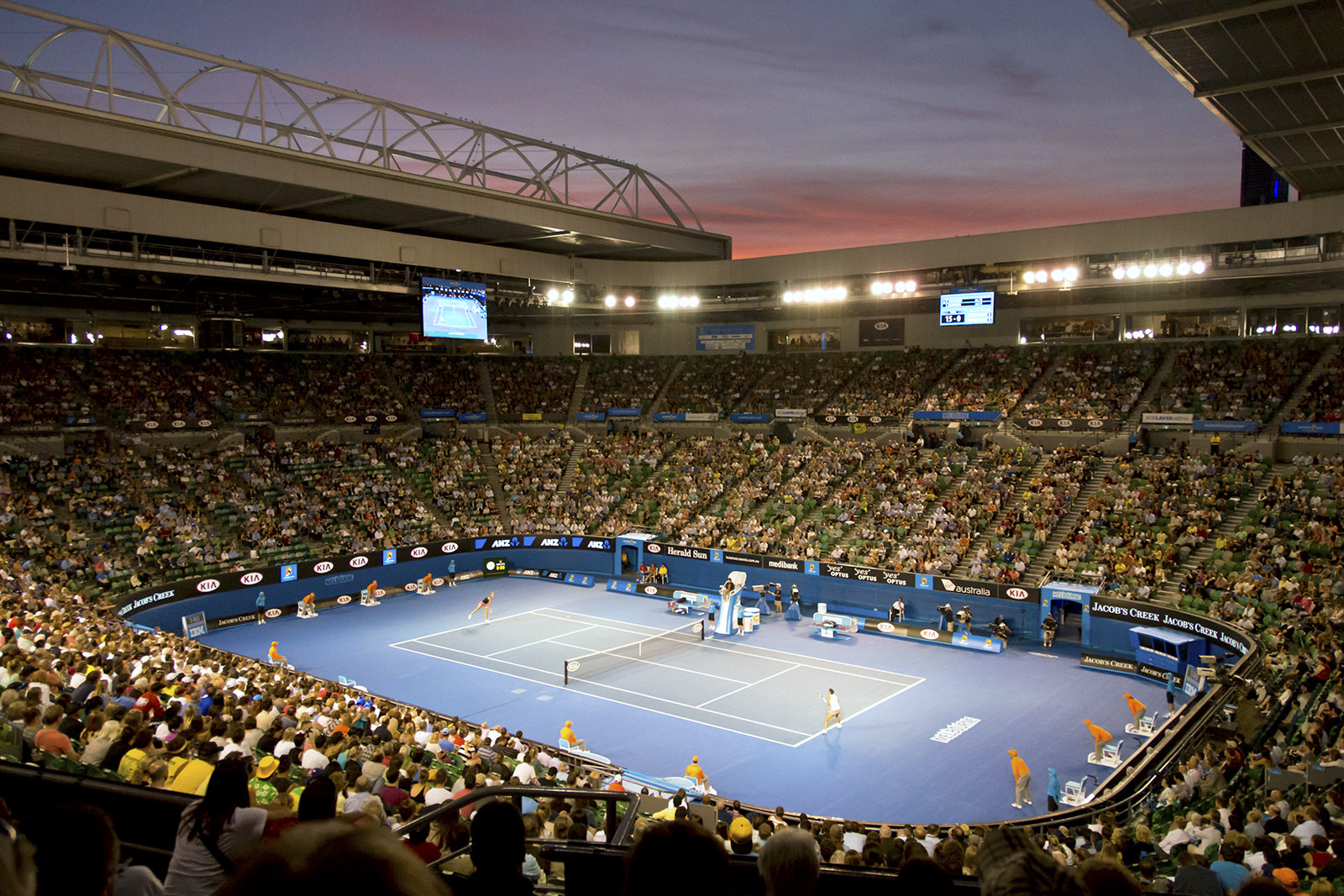
Rod Laver Arena where the Finals of the Australian Open took place

The 2017 Australian Open was the 105th edition of the tournament and was held at Melbourne Park in Melbourne, Australia.

The tournament was run by the International Tennis Federation (ITF) and is part of the 2017 ATP World Tour and the 2017 WTA Tour calendars under the Grand Slam category. The tournament consisted of both men's and women's singles and doubles draw as well as a mixed doubles event. There were singles and doubles events for both boys and girls (players under 18), which are part of the Grade A category of tournaments, and also singles, doubles, and quad events for men's and women's wheelchair tennis players as part of the NEC tour under the Grand Slam category.

The tournament was played on hard courts and took place over a series of 25 courts, including the three main show courts: Rod Laver Arena, Hisense Arena and Margaret Court Arena.

== Broadcast ==
In Australia, selected key matches were broadcast live by the Seven Network. The majority of matches was shown on the network's primary channel Channel Seven; however, during news programming nationwide and most night matches in Perth, coverage shifted to either 7Two or 7mate. Additionally, every match was also available to be streamed live through a free 7Tennis mobile app.

Internationally, Eurosport held the rights for Europe, broadcasting matches on Eurosport 1, Eurosport 2 and the Eurosport Player.

== Singles players ==
Men's singles

Champion		Runner-up	
(Switzerland) Roger Federer [17]		(Spain) Rafael Nadal [9]	
Semi-finals out
(Switzerland) Stan Wawrinka [4]		(Bulgaria) Grigor Dimitrov [15]	
Quarter-finals out
(Germany) Mischa Zverev	(France) Jo-Wilfried Tsonga [12]	(Canada) Milos Raonic [3]	(Belgium) David Goffin [11]
4th round out
(United Kingdom) Andy Murray [1]	(Japan) Kei Nishikori [5]	(Italy) Andreas Seppi	(United Kingdom) Daniel Evans
(France) Gaël Monfils [6]	(Spain) Roberto Bautista Agut [13]	(Austria) Dominic Thiem [8]	(Uzbekistan) Denis Istomin (WC)
3rd round out
(United States) Sam Querrey [31]	(Tunisia) Malek Jaziri	(Czech Republic) Tomáš Berdych [10]	(Slovakia) Lukáš Lacko (Q)
(Serbia) Viktor Troicki [29]	(Belgium) Steve Darcis	(United States) Jack Sock [23]	(Australia) Bernard Tomic [27]
(Germany) Philipp Kohlschreiber [32]	(Germany) Alexander Zverev [24]	(Spain) David Ferrer [21]	(France) Gilles Simon [25]
(France) Benoît Paire	(Croatia) Ivo Karlović [20]	(France) Richard Gasquet [18]	(Spain) Pablo Carreño Busta [30]
2nd round out
(Russia) Andrey Rublev (Q)	(Australia) Alex de Minaur (WC)	(United States) John Isner [19]	(Kazakhstan) Alexander Bublik (Q)
(United States) Ryan Harrison	(United States) Noah Rubin (Q)	(Israel) Dudi Sela	(France) Jérémy Chardy
(United States) Steve Johnson	(Italy) Paolo Lorenzi	(Argentina) Diego Schwartzman	(Australia) Nick Kyrgios [14]
(Serbia) Dušan Lajović	(Russia) Karen Khachanov	(Dominican Republic) Víctor Estrella Burgos	(Croatia) Marin Čilić [7]
(Ukraine) Alexandr Dolgopolov	(United States) Donald Young	(United States) Frances Tiafoe (Q)	(Cyprus) Marcos Baghdatis
(Japan) Yoshihito Nishioka	(United States) Ernesto Escobedo (Q)	(Brazil) Rogério Dutra Silva	(Luxembourg) Gilles Müller
(Australia) Jordan Thompson	(Italy) Fabio Fognini	(Australia) Andrew Whittington (WC)	(Czech Republic) Radek Štěpánek (Q)
(South Korea) Chung Hyeon	(Argentina) Carlos Berlocq	(United Kingdom) Kyle Edmund	(Serbia) Novak Djokovic [2]
1st round out
(Ukraine) Illya Marchenko	(Chinese Taipei) Lu Yen-hsun	(Austria) Gerald Melzer	(France) Quentin Halys (WC)
(Russia) Konstantin Kravchuk	(Spain) Guillermo García López	(Japan) Go Soeda (Q)	(France) Lucas Pouille [16]
(Italy) Luca Vanni (Q)	(France) Nicolas Mahut	(United States) Bjorn Fratangelo (Q)	(Austria) Jürgen Melzer (Q)
(Spain) Albert Ramos Viñolas [26]	(Spain) Marcel Granollers	(Spain) Nicolás Almagro	(Russia) Andrey Kuznetsov
(Slovakia) Martin Kližan	(Argentina) Federico Delbonis	(Australia) James Duckworth	(Bosnia and Herzegovina) Damir Džumhur
(Uruguay) Pablo Cuevas [22]	(Australia) Sam Groth (WC)	(France) Paul-Henri Mathieu	(Portugal) Gastão Elias
(Brazil) Thiago Monteiro	(France) Stéphane Robert	(France) Adrian Mannarino	(France) Pierre-Hugues Herbert
(Brazil) Thomaz Bellucci	(United Kingdom) Aljaž Bedene	(Argentina) Facundo Bagnis	(Poland) Jerzy Janowicz (PR)
(Czech Republic) Jiří Veselý	(Croatia) Borna Ćorić	(Italy) Thomas Fabbiano (Q)	(Georgia (country)) Nikoloz Basilashvili
(Netherlands) Robin Haase	(Kazakhstan) Mikhail Kukushkin	(Russia) Mikhail Youzhny	(Germany) Florian Mayer
(Argentina) Guido Pella	(Australia) Alex Bolt (Q)	(Russia) Daniil Medvedev	(Australia) Omar Jasika (WC)
(United States) Michael Mmoh (WC)	(United States) Jared Donaldson	(United States) Taylor Fritz	(Germany) Dustin Brown
(Germany) Jan-Lennard Struff	(Portugal) João Sousa	(Germany) Tommy Haas (PR)	(Spain) Feliciano López [28]
(Argentina) Horacio Zeballos	(Czech Republic) Adam Pavlásek	(Russia) Dmitry Tursunov (PR)	(United States) Reilly Opelka (Q)
(Australia) Christopher O'Connell (WC)	(Argentina) Renzo Olivo	(Moldova) Radu Albot	(Australia) Blake Mott (Q)
(Canada) Peter Polansky (LL)	(Colombia) Santiago Giraldo	(Croatia) Ivan Dodig (Q)	(Spain) Fernando Verdasco

Women's singles

Champion		Runner-up	
(United States) Serena Williams [2]		(United States) Venus Williams [13]	
Semi-finals out
(United States) CoCo Vandeweghe		(Croatia) Mirjana Lučić-Baroni	
Quarter-finals out
(Spain) Garbiñe Muguruza [7]	(Russia) Anastasia Pavlyuchenkova [24]	(Czech Republic) Karolína Plíšková [5]	(United Kingdom) Johanna Konta [9]
4th round out
(Germany) Angelique Kerber [1]	(Romania) Sorana Cîrstea	(Germany) Mona Barthel (Q)	(Russia) Svetlana Kuznetsova [8]
(Australia) Daria Gavrilova [22]	(United States) Jennifer Brady (Q)	(Russia) Ekaterina Makarova [30]	(Czech Republic) Barbora Strýcová [16]
3rd round out
(Czech Republic) Kristýna Plíšková	(Canada) Eugenie Bouchard	(United States) Alison Riske	(Latvia) Anastasija Sevastova [32]
(Australia) Ashleigh Barty (WC)	(China) Duan Yingying	(Ukraine) Elina Svitolina [11]	(Serbia) Jelena Janković
(Latvia) Jeļena Ostapenko	(Switzerland) Timea Bacsinszky [12]	(Russia) Elena Vesnina [14]	(Greece) Maria Sakkari
(Slovakia) Dominika Cibulková [6]	(Denmark) Caroline Wozniacki [17]	(France) Caroline Garcia [21]	(United States) Nicole Gibbs
2nd round out
(Germany) Carina Witthöft	(Romania) Irina-Camelia Begu [27]	(China) Peng Shuai	(France) Pauline Parmentier
(Spain) Carla Suárez Navarro [10]	(China) Zhang Shuai [20]	(Slovakia) Kristína Kučová	(United States) Samantha Crawford
(United States) Shelby Rogers	(Puerto Rico) Monica Puig [29]	(United States) Varvara Lepchenko	(Switzerland) Stefanie Vögele (Q)
(United States) Julia Boserup (Q)	(Russia) Natalia Vikhlyantseva (Q)	(Germany) Julia Görges	(Australia) Jaimee Fourlis (WC)
(Russia) Anna Blinkova (Q)	(Kazakhstan) Yulia Putintseva [31]	(Croatia) Ana Konjuh	(Montenegro) Danka Kovinić
(Luxembourg) Mandy Minella	(United Kingdom) Heather Watson	(France) Alizé Cornet [28]	(Poland) Agnieszka Radwańska [3]
(Chinese Taipei) Hsieh Su-wei	(Italy) Sara Errani	(Croatia) Donna Vekić	(Japan) Naomi Osaka
(Germany) Andrea Petkovic	(France) Océane Dodin	(United States) Irina Falconi	(Czech Republic) Lucie Šafářová
1st round out
(Ukraine) Lesia Tsurenko	(Japan) Eri Hozumi (Q)	(Switzerland) Viktorija Golubic	(Kazakhstan) Yaroslava Shvedova
(Russia) Daria Kasatkina [23]	(United States) Louisa Chirico	(Japan) Misaki Doi	(Italy) Roberta Vinci [15]
(Slovakia) Jana Čepelová	(Russia) Irina Khromacheva	(United States) Madison Brengle	(Belarus) Aliaksandra Sasnovich (Q)
(Japan) Nao Hibino	(United States) Christina McHale	(United States) Lauren Davis	(New Zealand) Marina Erakovic
(Romania) Simona Halep [4]	(Germany) Annika Beck	(Australia) Destanee Aiava (WC)	(Romania) Patricia Maria Țig
(Netherlands) Kiki Bertens [19]	(Slovakia) Rebecca Šramková (Q)	(Japan) Kurumi Nara	(Ukraine) Kateryna Kozlova
(Kazakhstan) Galina Voskoboeva (PR)	(Italy) Francesca Schiavone	(United States) Vania King	(Russia) Evgeniya Rodina
(Germany) Laura Siegemund [26]	(Czech Republic) Kateřina Siniaková	(United States) Anna Tatishvili (PR)	(Colombia) Mariana Duque Mariño
(Spain) Sara Sorribes Tormo	(Romania) Monica Niculescu	(China) Zhu Lin (Q)	(Spain) Lara Arruabarrena
(United Kingdom) Naomi Broady	(France) Kristina Mladenovic	(China) Zheng Saisai	(Italy) Camila Giorgi
(Romania) Ana Bogdan (Q)	(Poland) Magda Linette	(Belgium) Maryna Zanevska (LL)	(Australia) Samantha Stosur [18]
(France) Myrtille Georges (WC)	(Estonia) Anett Kontaveit	(China) Wang Qiang	(Bulgaria) Tsvetana Pironkova
(Czech Republic) Denisa Allertová	(Italy) Karin Knapp (PR)	(Japan) Risa Ozaki	(Russia) Ekaterina Alexandrova
(Australia) Arina Rodionova (WC)	(Australia) Lizette Cabrera (WC)	(Thailand) Luksika Kumkhum (WC)	(Belgium) Kirsten Flipkens
(Russia) Elizaveta Kulichkova (Q)	(United States) Kayla Day (WC)	(Turkey) Çağla Büyükakçay	(Ukraine) Kateryna Bondarenko
(Hungary) Tímea Babos [25]	(China) Han Xinyun	(Belgium) Yanina Wickmayer	(Switzerland) Belinda Bencic

== Events ==
=== Men's singles ===
- (Switzerland) Roger Federer defeated (Spain) Rafael Nadal, 6–4, 3–6, 6–1, 3–6, 6–3

This was a rematch of the 2009 Australian Open final, which Rafael Nadal won to become the first Spaniard to win the Australian Open title. The final saw the two holding service for six games of the first set, whilst during the seventh game was the pivotal break of serve giving Federer the opening set. Nadal quickly broke Federer's serve in the second set racing out to a lead that Federer could not overcome, giving him the second set and leveling the match at one set apiece. The third set was a rather lopsided affair seeing Nadal secure his service game only in the fourth game of the set. The fourth set started off competitively with the two holdings serve until Nadal broke in the fourth game of the set, a lead he would never surrender, evening the match at two sets apiece. The decisive fifth set commenced with a break of Federer's serve by Nadal, giving him a lead in the early going; however, Nadal's serve got broken during the sixth game of the set, leveling the match at two sets and three games apiece. Federer won the next three games breaking Nadal's service in the eighth game of the set to allow him to successfully serve out the match in the final ninth game. This was Roger Federer's 18th Grand Slam singles title, the most ever by a man in the history of tennis, and it was his fifth Australian Open title, just one shy of the record co-held by Novak Djokovic and Roy Emerson. Federer would go on to equal this record by defending his title successfully the next year.

=== Women's singles ===
- (United States) Serena Williams defeated (United States) Venus Williams, 6–4, 6–4

This was a rematch of the 2003 Australian Open final, where Serena Williams completed the first "Serena Slam" and her career Grand Slam, whilst Serena won five more Australian Open titles in the interim and her sister Venus had no other final appearances at the event. They each broke the others' serve twice to start the match with Venus finally holding serve in the fifth service game and her sister Serena holding her own serve in the subsequent game. The seventh game was the pivotal break of service that Serena Williams got on her sister Venus' serve, costing her the set just a mere three games later. During the second set, the two traded held service games for the first six games to start the set, whilst Venus started serving first. She would get broken again during the seventh game of the set, which eventually surrendered the match to sister Serena. This was Serena Williams' 23 Grand Slam singles title and seventh Australian Open title for her career, both being Open era records, whilst being one shy of Margaret Court's record of 24 in the history of tennis.

=== Men's doubles ===
- (Finland) Henri Kontinen / (Australia) John Peers defeated. (United States) Bob Bryan / (United States) Mike Bryan, 7–5, 7–5

=== Women's doubles ===
- (United States) Bethanie Mattek-Sands / (Czech Republic) Lucie Šafářová defeated (Czech Republic) Andrea Hlaváčková / (China) Peng Shuai, 6–7^{(4–7)}, 6–3, 6–3

=== Mixed doubles ===
- (United States) Abigail Spears / (Colombia) Juan Sebastián Cabal defeated (India) Sania Mirza / (Croatia) Ivan Dodig, 6–2, 6–4

=== Wheelchair men's singles ===
- (Argentina) Gustavo Fernández defeated (France) Nicolas Peifer, 3–6, 6–2, 6–0

=== Wheelchair women's singles ===
- (Japan) Yui Kamiji defeated (Netherlands) Jiske Griffioen, 6–7^{(2–7)}, 6–3, 6–3

=== Wheelchair quad singles ===
- (Australia) Dylan Alcott defeated (United Kingdom) Andrew Lapthorne, 6–2, 6–2

=== Wheelchair men's doubles ===
- (Belgium) Joachim Gérard / (United Kingdom) Gordon Reid defeated (Argentina) Gustavo Fernández / (United Kingdom) Alfie Hewett, 6–3, 3–6, [10–3]

=== Wheelchair women's doubles ===
- (Netherlands) Jiske Griffioen / (Netherlands) Aniek van Koot defeated (Netherlands) Diede de Groot / (Japan) Yui Kamiji, 6–3, 6–2

=== Wheelchair quad doubles ===
- (United Kingdom) Andrew Lapthorne / (United States) David Wagner defeated (Australia) Dylan Alcott / (Australia) Heath Davidson, 6–3, 6–3

=== Boys' singles ===
- (Hungary) Zsombor Piros defeated (Israel) Yshai Oliel, 4–6, 6–4, 6–3

=== Girls' singles ===
- (Ukraine) Marta Kostyuk defeated (Switzerland) Rebeka Masarova, 7–5, 1–6, 6–4

=== Boys' doubles ===
- (Chinese Taipei) Hsu Yu-hsiou / (China) Zhao Lingxi defeated (New Zealand) Finn Reynolds / (Portugal) Duarte Vale, 6–7^{(8–10)}, 6–4, [10–5]

=== Girls' doubles ===
- (Canada) Bianca Andreescu / (United States) Carson Branstine defeated (Poland) Maja Chwalińska / (Poland) Iga Świątek, 6–1, 7–6^{(7–4)}

== Doubles seeds ==
=== Men's doubles ===
Team		Rank^{1}	Seed
(France) Pierre-Hugues Herbert	(France) Nicolas Mahut	3	1
(United Kingdom) Jamie Murray	(Brazil) Bruno Soares	7	2
(United States) Bob Bryan	(United States) Mike Bryan	10	3
(Finland) Henri Kontinen	(Australia) John Peers	16	4
(Spain) Feliciano López	(Spain) Marc López	23	5
(South Africa) Raven Klaasen	(United States) Rajeev Ram	23	6
(Poland) Łukasz Kubot	(Brazil) Marcelo Melo	31	7
(Canada) Daniel Nestor	(France) Édouard Roger-Vasselin	32	8
(Croatia) Ivan Dodig	(Spain) Marcel Granollers	34	9
(Philippines) Treat Huey	(Belarus) Max Mirnyi	43	10
(Netherlands) Jean-Julien Rojer	(Romania) Horia Tecău	46	11
(Canada) Vasek Pospisil	(Czech Republic) Radek Štěpánek	54	12
(Croatia) Mate Pavić	(Austria) Alexander Peya	55	13
(Colombia) Juan Sebastián Cabal	(Colombia) Robert Farah	60	14
(India) Rohan Bopanna	(Uruguay) Pablo Cuevas	61	15
(United Kingdom) Dominic Inglot	(Romania) Florin Mergea	68	16

- ^{1} Rankings are as of 9 January 2017.

=== Women's doubles ===
Team		Rank^{1}	Seed
(France) Caroline Garcia	(France) Kristina Mladenovic	6	1
(United States) Bethanie Mattek-Sands	(Czech Republic) Lucie Šafářová	9	2
(Russia) Ekaterina Makarova	(Russia) Elena Vesnina	13	3
(India) Sania Mirza	(Czech Republic) Barbora Strýcová	19	4
(Switzerland) Martina Hingis	(United States) CoCo Vandeweghe	23	5
(Chinese Taipei) Chan Hao-ching	(Chinese Taipei) Chan Yung-jan	24	6
(Germany) Julia Görges	(Czech Republic) Karolína Plíšková	27	7
(United States) Vania King	(Kazakhstan) Yaroslava Shvedova	39	8
(Romania) Monica Niculescu	(United States) Abigail Spears	39	9
(Czech Republic) Lucie Hradecká	(Czech Republic) Kateřina Siniaková	43	10
(United States) Raquel Atawo	(China) Xu Yifan	43	11
(Czech Republic) Andrea Hlaváčková	(China) Peng Shuai	50	12
(Slovenia) Katarina Srebotnik	(China) Zheng Saisai	50	13
(Netherlands) Kiki Bertens	(Sweden) Johanna Larsson	52	14
(United States) Serena Williams (withdrew)	(United States) Venus Williams (withdrew)	60	15
(Croatia) Darija Jurak	(Australia) Anastasia Rodionova	72	16

- ^{1} Rankings are as of 9 January 2017.

=== Mixed doubles ===
Team		Rank^{1}	Seed
(United States) Bethanie Mattek-Sands	(United States) Mike Bryan	6	1
(India) Sania Mirza	(Croatia) Ivan Dodig	16	2
(Czech Republic) Andrea Hlaváčková	(France) Édouard Roger-Vasselin	26	3
(Chinese Taipei) Chan Hao-ching	(Belarus) Max Mirnyi	33	4
(Chinese Taipei) Chan Yung-jan	(Poland) Łukasz Kubot	35	5
(Czech Republic) Kateřina Siniaková	(Brazil) Bruno Soares	36	6
(Czech Republic) Lucie Hradecká	(Czech Republic) Radek Štěpánek	46	7
(Czech Republic) Barbora Krejčíková	(United States) Rajeev Ram	49	8

- ^{1} Rankings are as of 9 January 2017.

== Main draw wildcard entries ==
=== Men's doubles ===
- (Australia) Matthew Barton / (Australia) Matthew Ebden
- (Australia) Alex Bolt / (Australia) Bradley Mousley
- (Australia) Alex de Minaur / (Australia) Max Purcell
- (Chinese Taipei) Hsieh Cheng-peng / (Chinese Taipei) Yang Tsung-hua
- (Australia) Marc Polmans / (Australia) Andrew Whittington
- (Australia) Matt Reid / (Australia) John-Patrick Smith
- (Australia) Luke Saville / (Australia) Jordan Thompson

=== Women's doubles ===
- (Australia) Destanee Aiava / (Australia) Alicia Smith
- (Australia) Alison Bai / (Australia) Lizette Cabrera
- (Australia) Ashleigh Barty / (Australia) Casey Dellacqua
- (Australia) Kimberly Birrell / (Australia) Priscilla Hon
- (Chinese Taipei) Chan Chin-wei / (Japan) Junri Namigata
- (Australia) Jessica Moore / (Australia) Storm Sanders
- (Australia) Ellen Perez / (Australia) Olivia Tjandramulia

=== Mixed doubles ===
- (Australia) Destanee Aiava / (Australia) Marc Polmans
- (Australia) Casey Dellacqua / (Australia) Matt Reid
- (Australia) Daria Gavrilova / (Australia) Luke Saville
- (Switzerland) Martina Hingis / (India) Leander Paes
- (France) Pauline Parmentier / (France) Nicolas Mahut
- (Australia) Sally Peers / (Australia) John Peers
- (Australia) Arina Rodionova / (Australia) John-Patrick Smith
- (Australia) Samantha Stosur / (Australia) Sam Groth

== Point and prize money distribution ==
=== Point distribution ===
Below is a series of tables for each of the competitions showing the ranking points offered for each event.

==== Senior points ====
Event	W	F	SF	QF	Round of 16	Round of 32	Round of 64	Round of 128	Q	Q3	Q2	Q1
Men's singles	2000	1200	720	360	180	90	45	10	25	16	8	0
Men's doubles	2000	1200	720	360	180	90	0	—N/a	—N/a	—N/a	—N/a	—N/a
Women's singles	2000	1300	780	430	240	130	70	10	40	30	20	2
Women's doubles	2000	1300	780	430	240	130	10	—N/a	—N/a	—N/a	—N/a	—N/a

==== Wheelchair points ====
Event	W	F	SF/3rd	QF/4th
Singles	800	500	375	100
Doubles	800	500	100	—N/a
Quad singles	800	500	100	—N/a
Quad doubles	800	100	—N/a	—N/a

==== Junior points ====
Event	W	F	SF	QF	Round of 16	Round of 32	Q	Q3
Boys' singles	375	270	180	120	75	30	25	20
Girls' singles	375	270	180	120	75	30	25	20
Boys' doubles	270	180	120	75	45	—N/a	—N/a	—N/a
Girls' doubles	270	180	120	75	45	—N/a	—N/a	—N/a

=== Prize money ===
The Australian Open total prize money for 2017 was increased by 14% to a tournament record A$50,000,000.

Event	W	F	SF	QF	Round of 16	Round of 32	Round of 64	Round of 128^{1}	Q3	Q2	Q1
Singles	A$3,700,000	A$1,900,000	A$900,000	A$440,000	A$220,000	A$130,000	A$80,000	A$50,000	A$25,000	A$12,500	A$6,250
Doubles *	A$650,000	A$325,000	A$160,500	A$80,000	A$40,000	A$23,000	A$14,800	—N/a	—N/a	—N/a	—N/a
Mixed doubles *	A$150,500	A$75,500	A$37,500	A$18,750	A$9,000	A$4,500	—N/a	—N/a	—N/a	—N/a	—N/a

^{1}Qualifiers prize money was also the Round of 128 prize money.
*per team

Preceded by 2016 US Open	Grand Slams	Succeeded by 2017 French Open
