= 2009 Australian Open – Men's singles final =

2009 Australian Open Men's Final
- (Spain) Rafael Nadal (1) vs. (Switzerland) Roger Federer (2)
| Set | 1 | 2 | 3 | 4 | 5 |
|---|---|---|---|---|---|
| (Spain) Rafael Nadal | 7 | 3 | 7^{7} | 3 | 6 |
| (Switzerland) Roger Federer | 5 | 6 | 6^{3} | 6 | 2 |
- Date: Sunday, 1 February 2009
- Tournament: Australian Open
- Location: Melbourne
- Chair umpire: Pascal Maria
- Duration: 4 hours 23 minutes
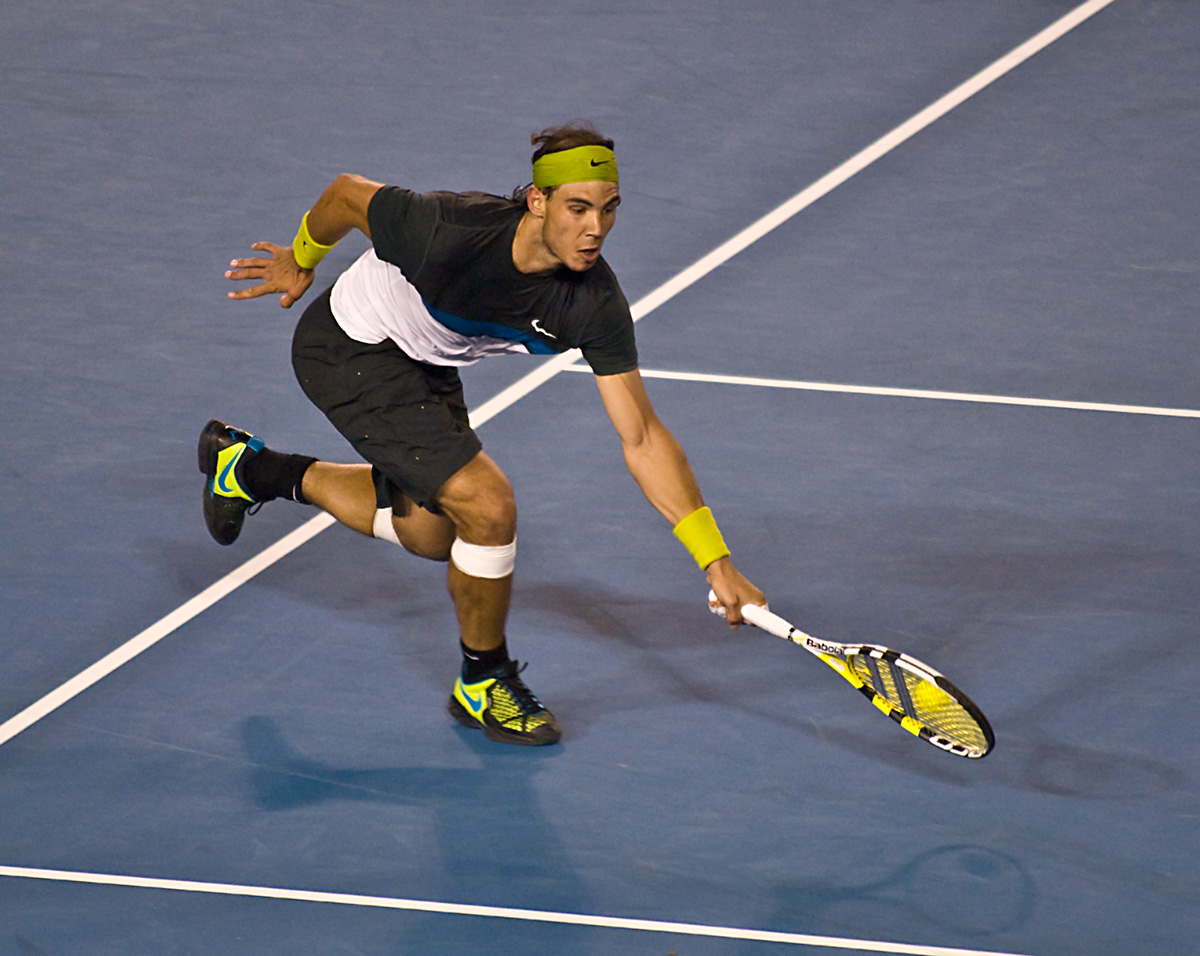
- Rafael Nadal
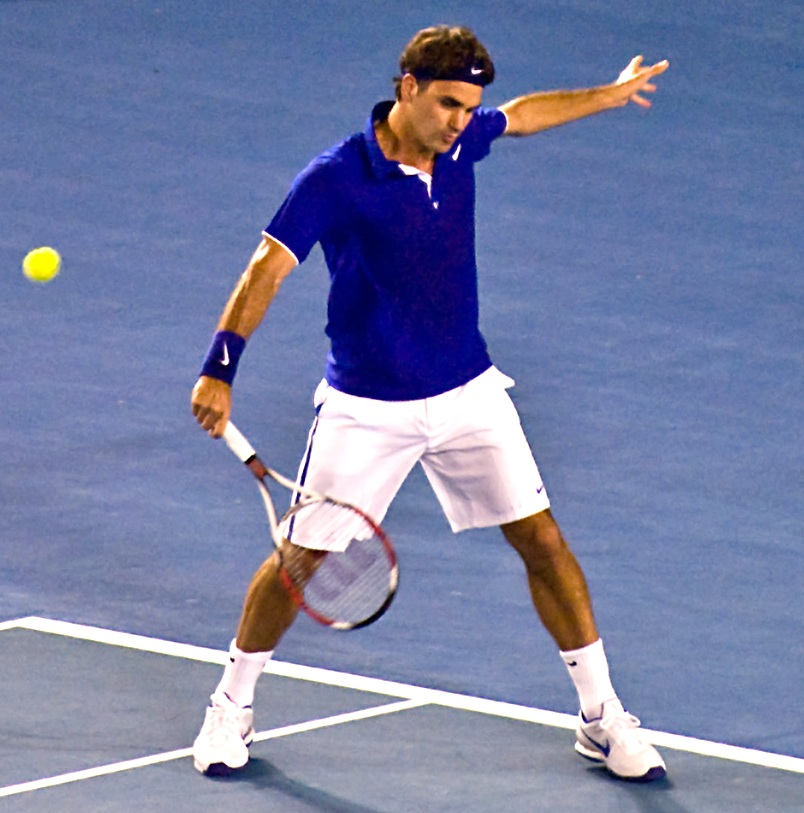
- Roger Federer

The 2009 Australian Open Men's singles final was the championship tennis match of the Men's singles tournament at the 2009 Australian Open. It was contested between the world's top two players for much of the previous four years, Rafael Nadal and Roger Federer, then ranked first and second in the world respectively. It was the pair's seventh of nine meetings in a major final, and their first outside of either the French Open or Wimbledon. This was Nadal's first major hard court final, while it was Federer's ninth and at the time he was yet to lose in a major hard court final.

Nadal defeated Federer in five sets after 4 hours and 23 minutes, with the match finishing after midnight, becoming the first Spaniard, male or female, to win the Australian Open. The match was lauded as one of the greatest ever played at the Australian Open, and came seven months after the pair contested the 2008 Wimbledon final, a match widely regarded as one of the greatest-ever.

== Match ==
Pascal Maria was the chair umpire for the match. Nadal won the coin toss and elected to begin the match receiving.

=== First set ===
Federer began the match serving and immediately gifted a break of serve to Nadal with a double fault and three unforced errors. Both men settled in well from there in the next game where Federer went ahead 15–30 after a forehand winner. Nadal fought back to deuce after saving a break point. Federer earned a second break point after three deuces, but did not convert it after a backhand error. Nadal then hit a forehand long to give Federer a third break point. The game lasted for ten minutes before Federer broke Nadal with a forehand winner to level the opening set at 1–1. Federer held serve with another forehand winner to get to 2–1. Nadal held comfortably to reach 2–2. In the fifth game at 30–30, Nadal's forehand was out but the linesman did not call it. Federer challenged and the Hawkeye review showed the ball was long, giving Federer 40–30 instead of break point to Nadal. Federer held at deuce to go ahead 3–2.

At 3–2 on Nadal's serve, Federer got to 30–30 after Nadal unsuccessfully challenged his own forehand that was long by about a millimetre. Federer hit a winner in the next rally to gain another break point. At 30–40, Federer hammered a return winner to break Nadal for the second time and gain a 4–2 lead. In the seventh game, Federer was unable to consolidate the break. Nadal hit a forehand winner to gain a break point opportunity in which Federer double faulted on to hand a second break to Nadal. Back on serve, Federer got to 30–30 the next game but Nadal held after Federer netted his next two returns. The set went to 5–5 where Nadal broke Federer for the third time in the set with a passing shot to go ahead 6–5. Nadal then served it out to win the first set 7–5. The set lasted 57 minutes and saw a wild pace of play with many long rallies. Federer was serving below his normal level which gave Nadal an early advantage.

=== Second set ===
The second set saw more of the same pace. Nadal relentlessly kept on pummelling Federer's backhand hoping to draw errors. The set remained on serve until 2–2 where Nadal broke Federer to go ahead 3–2. Federer's first serve percentage was down to just 32% at this point. With the serve not working, Federer engaged in aggressive baseline rallies to compete with Nadal, constantly putting him on the defensive. Serving with a 3–2 lead, Nadal doubled faulted for the first time in the match. At 30–30, Nadal committed two errors to give Federer a break and level the set at 3–3. From there, Federer raised his game and held serve.

4–3 saw a long and grueling game as Nadal fell behind 15–40 in his service game. He saved the first break point after a rally and saved the second one with an excellent serve. Federer got the advantage at deuce but Nadal saved the third break point with an ace. Federer fought back to gain a fourth break point that Nadal saved with a drop shot. Federer kept slugging and regained the advantage with a backhand winner during the next rally. He finally broke Nadal on his fifth break point of the game to gain a 5–3 lead. Federer then served out the set to take it 6–3 after winning four games in a row. Federer had gotten himself back into the match from the baseline and won the second set despite having a first serve percentage of just 37%.

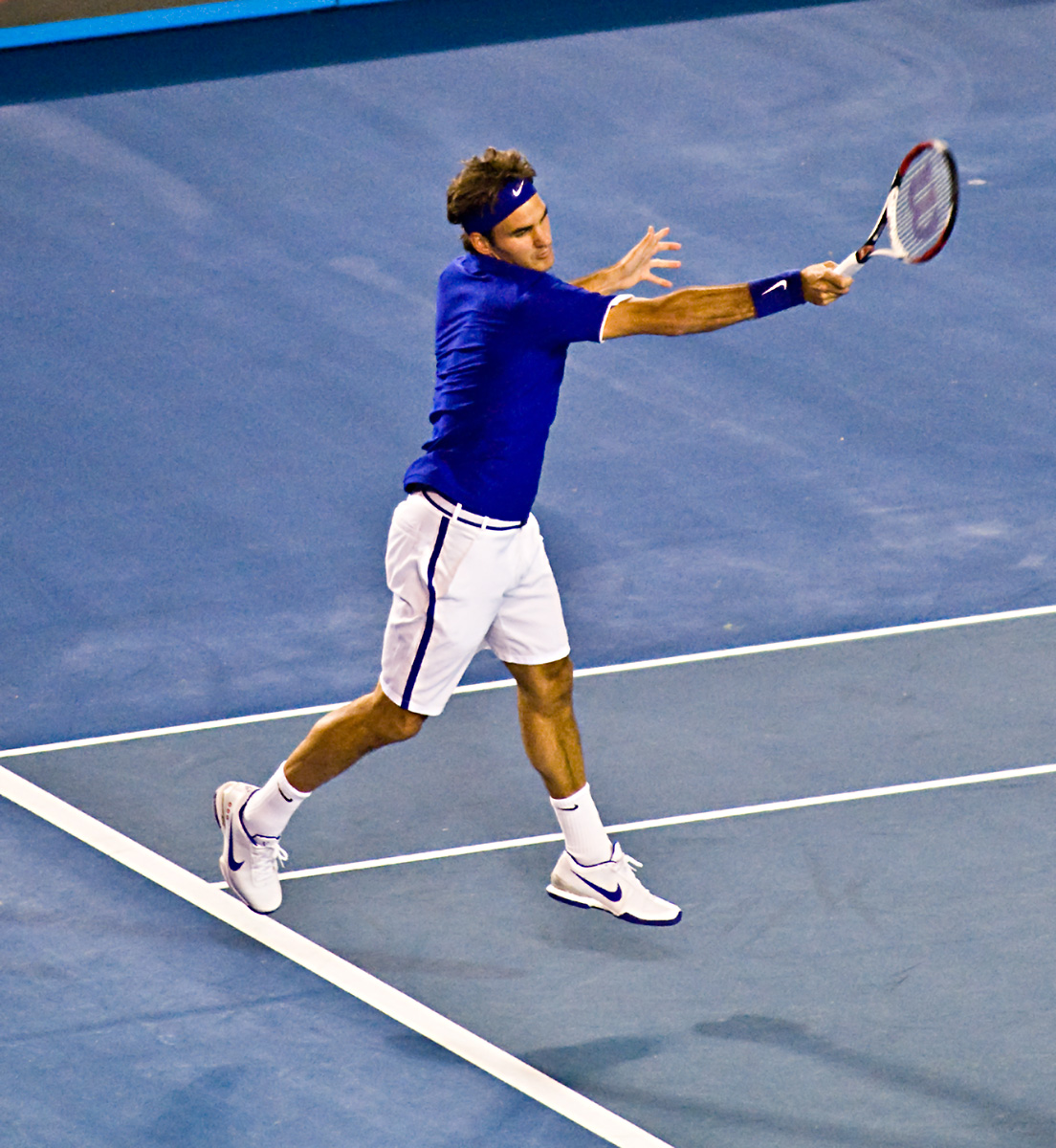
Roger Federer won four games in a row to claim the second set and tie the match.

=== Third set ===
In the third set, long rallies continued and both men held serve until 3–2 when Nadal gained the first break point of the set. Federer saved it after a grueling rally and went on to hold serve. At 3–3, Federer had an opening at 15–30 until he made 3 unforced errors to allow Nadal to hold. Federer held his next game relatively well to get to 4–4. Nadal then called for the trainer to massage his right thigh and the match saw a delay. After play resumed, Federer kept up his aggressive play to go ahead 0–40 and gain three break point chances. Two brutal rallies went Nadal's way, and at 30–40, he then caught Federer off guard with a serve to Federer's forehand to get to deuce. Nadal went on to hold with an ace and stay ahead 5–4. Federer held comfortably to get to 5–5 and Nadal once again called for the trainer.

When play resumed, Nadal quickly fell behind again in his service game 15–40. Federer hit a forehand long at 30–40 to keep Nadal in the game and reach deuce. The ball was clearly out but Federer used a strategic Hawkeye challenge on the call in an attempt to rattle Nadal. Nadal then lost the next point at 40–40, which he too strategically challenged to no avail. Federer then gained another break point after the ruling, his sixth break chance in the set. Nadal saved it with a forehand winner and went on to hold and stay ahead 6–5. Nadal fought hard in the next game to break. Federer saved a set point and needed three deuces to finally hold for 6–6. The tiebreak went to 3–3 where Federer shanked a forehand to give Nadal a mini-break. Nadal then hit two winners to go ahead 6–3 and found himself with three set points. Federer double faulted to end the 78-minute set and Nadal went ahead two-sets-to-one.

=== Fourth set ===
Federer went back to work quickly holding serve to begin the fourth set. A backhand winner from Federer and an error from Nadal set up two break points in the next game. Federer converted with a forehand winner to break Nadal and go ahead 2–0. Nadal then broke back in the third game with two forehand winners at 30–30 to get back into the set. Federer showed an outburst of emotion for allowing this to happen as he fired a ball into the advertising boards. Nadal then held to put the set back on serve. The next game was another grueling affair on Federer's serve. At 2–2, Federer fell behind 15–40 and a big serve got him to 30–40 as Nadal's return went long. At this moment the umpire overruled the call, believing that Nadal's return was good. Federer challenged and the Hawkeye review confirmed the return was long. After a spat with the umpire, Federer saved the next break point with a backhand winner to get the game to deuce.

They battled on in the same game, Federer got the advantage but lost it after another brutal rally. Federer lost another advantage with a double fault. On the third deuce, Nadal regained a break point with a forehand. Federer tried to save it with a drop shot but Nadal got to it, yet he hit the ball wide to keep Federer in the game. Another rally at deuce ended with a fourth break chance for Nadal. Federer saved it with an ace, and then further saved a fifth break point with a forehand winner. After the seventh deuce Federer held serve to survive the game. At 3–2, Federer broke Nadal again to regain his break lead. He went ahead 5–2 after holding and Nadal then held to stay in the set. At 5–3 with Federer serving for the set at 15-all, a Federer ball was called out and Nadal appeared to have an opening. A Federer challenge saw the ball barely catch the line, giving Federer 30–15 instead of 15–30. He went on the hold from there and claimed the fourth set 6–3.

=== Fifth set ===
Nadal served to open the fifth set with a hold. Federer held to get to 1–1, but showed signs of exhaustion as Nadal held easily to go ahead 2–1. From there, Nadal broke after two Federer backhand errors at 30–30 and gained a 3–1 lead. After Nadal's relentless onslaught on Federer's backhand for the better part of four hours, it finally broke down as the clock struck midnight in Melbourne. Serving at 3–1, Nadal raced ahead to a 40–0 lead. Federer fought back to 40–30 but Nadal got the hold to stay ahead 4–1. Federer then held at love to get back to 4–2. Federer lost the next game with another backhand error and Nadal lead 5–2.

Federer served to stay in the match, but committed a double fault at 0–15 to put Nadal two points away from victory. At 15–40, Federer saved a championship point with a good serve. At 30–40, Federer saved the second one after a long rally ended with a Nadal error. At deuce, a long rally saw Nadal create a third championship point with a backhand winner. One last rally ensued that saw Federer run around his backhand three times to hit a forehand. The contest finally came to an end as Federer's final forehand barely went long. The match ended at 12:14 AM as Nadal fell to the court in disbelief that he had won the Australian Open.

== Statistics ==
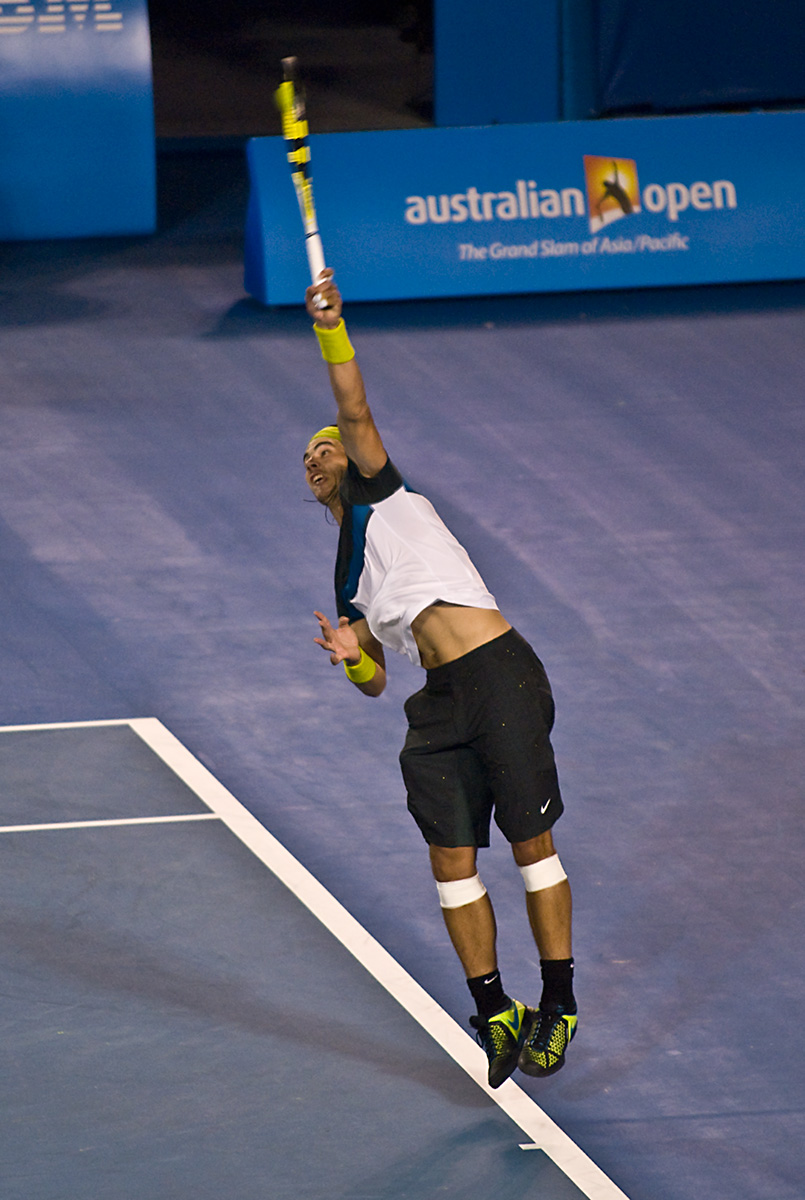
Rafael Nadal as he serves during the match.

The match statistics followed a similar pattern to those at the 2008 Wimbledon final, with Federer having a lower first serve percentage against Nadal (51% compared to 64%) and again he was not as clinical on break point opportunities with only 31% break points converted for Federer whereas Nadal converted 43% of his break points. However, the total points by each player proved even closer than that at the aforementioned Wimbledon final, as Federer won one more point than Nadal (174 to 173) yet still lost this final.

| Category | (Switzerland) Federer | (Spain) Nadal |
|---|---|---|
| 1st serve % | 89 of 172 = 51% | 112 of 175 = 64% |
| 1st serve points won | 65 of 89 = 73% | 74 of 112 = 66% |
| 2nd serve points won | 38 of 83 = 45% | 30 of 63 = 47% |
| Total service points won | 103 of 172 = 60% | 104 of 175 = 59% |
| Aces | 11 | 4 |
| Double faults | 6 | 4 |
| Winners | 71 | 50 |
| Unforced errors | 64 | 41 |
| Winners-UFE | +7 | +9 |
| Net approaches | 43 of 60 = 72% | 15 of 26 = 58% |
| Break point conversions | 6 of 19 = 31% | 7 of 16 = 43% |
| Receiving points won | 71 of 175 = 41% | 69 of 172 = 40% |
| Total points won | 174 | 173 |

Source / Source / Source

== Significance ==
It was a match of great significance for Federer, who had the opportunity to equal the all-time record of Grand Slams won, which at the time was fourteen (set by Pete Sampras). Federer simultaneously could have equaled the then Open Era record for the most Australian Open titles at four each with Andre Agassi (the record has since been broken by Novak Djokovic with ten Australian Open titles). Further, Federer had entered the match with an 8–0 record in hard court Grand Slam finals. The loss saw Federer fall short of equaling both as his undefeated record in hard court Major finals came to an end. The loss further brought about immediate doubt by some analysts who believed that Federer might never equal Sampras' record. This was Federer's first and only Australian Open final loss in his career (6–1 overall record). However, Federer would go on to equal both of the records within the following twelve months after the loss. Federer came back the next year and reclaimed the Australian Open title, winning his sixteenth major and fourth title in Australia.

As a result of his win, Nadal set his own records by holding three of the four Grand Slam titles at the same time for the first time in his career. Upon winning this final, it was Nadal's sixth major win and his first on a hard court. He also became the first man in the Open era to hold three Grand Slam titles on three different surfaces simultaneously, in addition to winning the Gold Medal at the 2008 Beijing Olympics. This Australian Open win for Nadal remains especially important as it his first win in Melbourne, which is an essential piece of his Career Grand Slam. Nadal eventually made it back to five more Australian Open finals in 2012, 2014, 2017, and 2019 and finally won it again in 2022. This also saw Nadal become the second man (after Djokovic) in the Open era to achieve a double Career Grand Slam, winning each of the majors at least twice in singles.

The defeat brought Federer to tears as he came to terms with his loss. Following the final, tennis analyst Bud Collins proposed that Federer might never win another major as long as Nadal was playing tennis. For years this was partially true in that Federer won four majors after this final, but indeed did not beat Nadal in three subsequent Grand Slam meetings. Federer lost to Nadal once more at the French Open final in 2011, and Federer lost to Nadal twice more at the Australian Open semifinals in 2012 and 2014. It would not be until the 2017 Australian Open that two would meet again in a Grand Slam final, ending in the 35-year-old Federer's five-set victory that claimed his 18th singles major and set new tennis records.

Until his 2017 Australian Open victory, Federer had not beaten Nadal in a Grand Slam since the 2007 Wimbledon final, and many analysts pointed to the 2009 Australian Open final as the match which severely compromised Federer's belief that he could win against Nadal in a major. Mats Wilander proposed that Federer had developed a mental block while playing against Nadal and that their rivalry had become one-sided and predictable after this match. Tennis Channel commentator Justin Gimelstob referred to Federer's loss as a type of 'collateral damage' in which Federer not only lost a tennis match but also lost his last remaining stronghold to Nadal, having lost major finals to him on clay, grass, and hard courts in succession.

As such, many believed that Nadal's victory over Federer would bring about a permanent change in the tennis rankings, as Nadal was then clearly the number-one player over Federer after the Swiss had held that title for over four-and-a-half years consecutively with Nadal being the second-best for nearly three years of that. Later in the year, however, Nadal would lose at the French Open for the first time when he lost to Robin Söderling in the fourth round. Söderling would eventually reach the final, before losing to Federer, who by winning the French Open for the first (and only) time completed his own Career Grand Slam and equalled Pete Sampras' then-record of 14 Major titles. Nadal later withdrew from Wimbledon due to a knee injury, while Federer, who lost to Nadal in the previous year's final, would regain the title after outlasting Andy Roddick 16–14 in a five-set epic and return to world number one in the rankings, displacing Nadal who dropped to No. 2 as a result of being unable to defend the Wimbledon title which he won in 2008. Just as Federer rebounded during the rest of 2009, Nadal would return from injury in 2010 to win 3 consecutive grand slams, the French Open, Wimbledon, and the US Open (completing his Career Grand Slam at a record 24 years of age).

== Nadal and Federer about the match ==
=== During the trophy presentation ===
Besides the 2008 Wimbledon Final, this match is still considered to be one of Federer's most devastating career losses. During the runner-up speech, Federer found himself in tears as he tried to speak. "Maybe I'll try later again I don't know. God it's killing me," Federer said before breaking down and stepping aside. Nadal then received the Norman Brookes Challenge Cup and put his arm around Federer, encouraging him to take to the microphone again. Federer stepped forward and finished his speech. "I don't want to have the last word. This guy deserves it. So, Rafa, congrats. You played incredible. You deserve it, man," Federer said. "I'd like to thank the legends for coming out. You know how much it means to me."

Nadal then addressed Federer as he took to the microphone. "Well first of all, sorry for today," he said to Federer. "I really know how you feel right now. It’s really tough. Remember, you’re a great champion. You’re one of the best of history." During his speech, Nadal further stated that Federer would recover from the loss to go on and break Sampras' record of fourteen Grand Slam titles in due time. Federer did exactly that at the following two Grand Slam tournaments, first equalling the record at the French Open and then breaking it at Wimbledon by winning his fifteenth major. Nadal was also able to surpass Sampras’ record several years later.

=== After the match ===
During the post-match press conference Federer admitted that he played a subpar fifth set and felt that the match should have never gone to five sets. "Maybe I should have never been there, you know, in the first place. I think he played well. I definitely played a terrible fifth set, you know. I kind of handed it over to him." Federer was further asked if he believed he could ever beat Nadal in a major final again. He responded, "Yeah, for sure. I didn't spend four and a half hours out there [not] believing it.

"[This was] one of the matches in my career where I feel like I could have or should have won, you know. But you can't go through your whole life as a tennis player taking every victory, you know, that's out there. You've got to live with those, you know. But they hurt even more so like if you're that close, you know, like at Wimbledon or like here at the Australian Open."

— Roger Federer, 2009 Australian Open Runner-up

Nadal's uncle and coach Toni later echoed this sentiment and felt that the match should have been over in three or four sets, and suggested that Federer has lost his belief while playing against Nadal. "The key difference in the match [then] was that in the final set Roger's level fell and Rafa was able to maintain his level," he said. Nadal felt that surviving the third set and winning it in a tiebreaker was the pivotal point of the match. "Winning the third was vital. It would have gotten very complicated if I had lost that set." Regarding Federer's breakdown during the trophy presentation, Nadal said he understood what Federer was feeling.

"Of course it can happen to all of us. It was an emotional moment, and I think this also lifts up sport, to see a great champion like Federer expressing his emotions. It shows his human side. But in these moments when you see a rival who is also a comrade, feeling like this, you enjoy the victory a little bit less."

— Rafael Nadal, 2009 Australian Open Champion

== See also ==
- Federer–Nadal rivalry
- 2008 Wimbledon Championships – Men's singles final
- 2012 Australian Open – Men's singles final
