= Rafa Nadal Academy =

Tennis school in Mallorca, Spain

Rafael Nadal Academy
- Founder: Rafael Nadal
- Established: 19 October 2016; 10 years ago
- Head: Toni Nadal
- Location: Manacor, Balearic Islands, Spain
- Coordinates: 39.5601°N 3.2133°E
- Interactive map of Rafael Nadal Academy
- Website: rafanadalacademy.com

The Rafa Nadal Academy by Movistar (RNA) is a tennis training center on the island of Mallorca, Spain. It was founded in 2016 by Rafael Nadal and located in his hometown of Manacor. The inaugural director is Toni Nadal, Rafa's uncle and longtime coach.

== History and facilities ==
Nadal founded the Rafa Nadal Foundation in 2008 and opened his first tennis school, the Nadal Educational Tennis School, in the Anantapur Sports Village in India in 2010.

The Rafa Nadal Academy in Manacor broke ground in November 2014. Operations began in June 2016 and an opening ceremony was held on 19 October 2016. At its opening, the academy was led by Toni Nadal (who stepped away from coaching his nephew the following year) and Nadal's longtime agent Carlos Costa. Nadal's new coach, former world No. 1 Carlos Moyá, was the technical director.

The campus in Manacor has 23 hard courts (19 outdoor, 4 indoor), 20 clay courts (13 outdoor, 7 semi-indoor), 12 padel courts (6 outdoor, 6 indoor), two squash courts, a football pitch, and two swimming pools (outdoor and indoor). There are also a sports medicine facility and an international school, the Rafa Nadal International School, for 10- to 18-year-olds.

Among the tournaments held on the site is the Rafa Nadal Open on the ATP Challenger Tour.

== Notable people ==
=== Coaches ===
- Pedro Clar
- Carlos Moyá (technical director)
- Toni Nadal (director)
- Gustavo Marcaccio
- Nuno Marques
- Tomeu Salvá
- Gabriel Urpí

=== Alumni ===
- Alexandra Eala
- Alina Korneeva
- Martín Landaluce
- Jaume Munar
- Casper Ruud
- Žiga Šeško
- Abdullah Shelbayh
- Solana Sierra
- Coleman Wong
