= Toni Nadal =

Spanish tennis coach (born 1961)

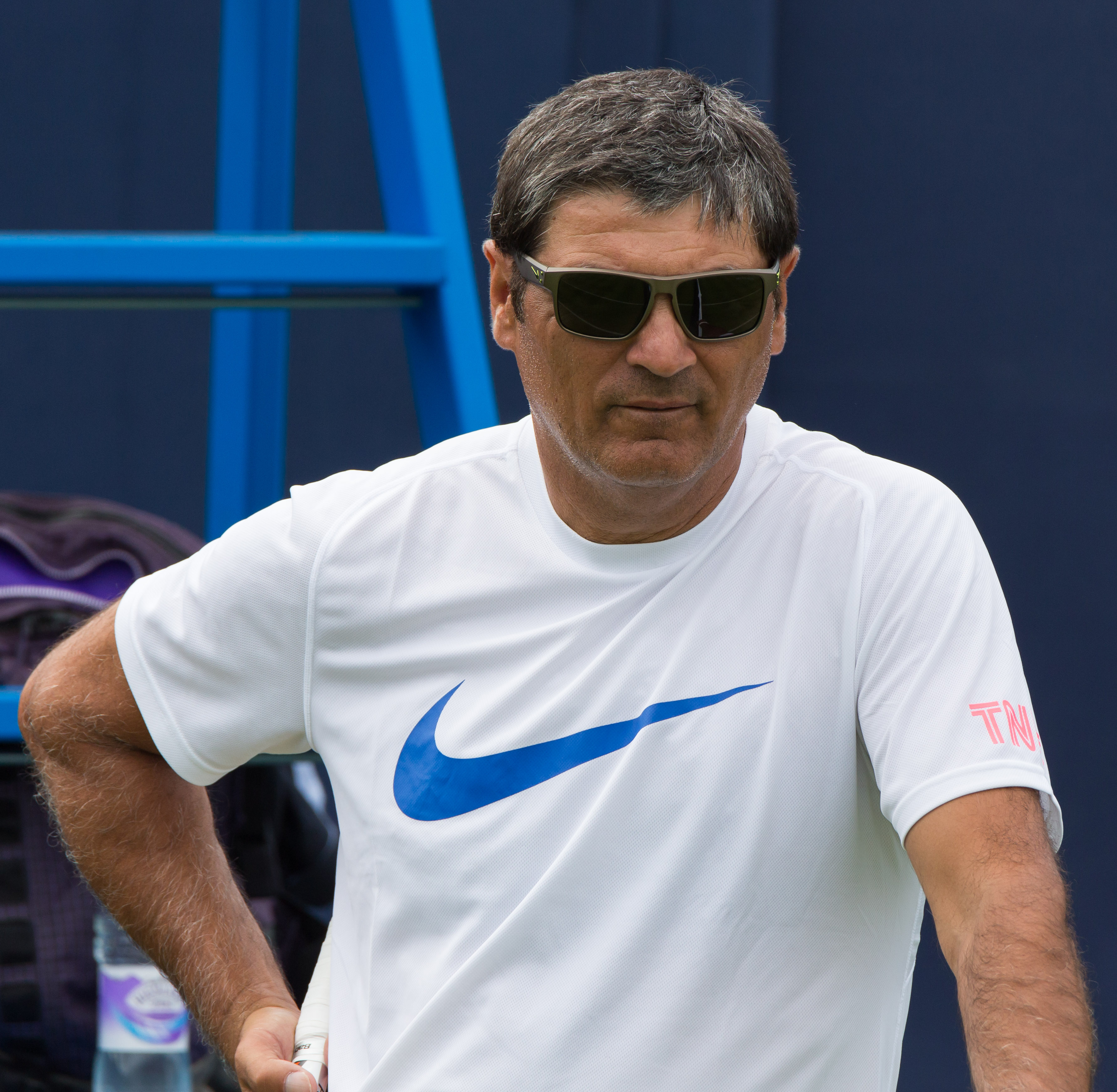
- Toni Nadal during practices at the 2015 Aegon Championships in London
- Country (sports): Spain
- Born: 21 February 1961 (age 65) Manacor, Mallorca, Spain

Coaching career (1990–2017, 2021–2024)
- Rafael Nadal (1990–2017); Félix Auger-Aliassime (2021–2024)

Coaching achievements
- Coachee singles titles total: 75
- Coachee doubles titles total: 11
- List of notable tournaments (with champion) Career Golden Slam (Nadal); Australian Open (Nadal); 14x French Open (Nadal); 2x Wimbledon (Nadal); 3x US Open (Nadal); Olympic Gold Medal (Nadal); 36x ATP World Tour Masters 1000 (Nadal); 4x Davis Cup (Nadal)

Coaching awards and records
- Records List of career achievements by Rafael Nadal; 873–185 (83.75%)

Antonio "Toni" Nadal Homar (Spanish pronunciation: [anˈtonjo ˈtoni naˈðal oˈmaɾ]; born 21 February 1961) is a Spanish tennis coach. Toni Nadal is the uncle and ex-coach of tennis player Rafael Nadal, the ex-coach of tennis player Félix Auger-Aliassime, and the elder brother of Spanish former professional footballer Miguel Ángel Nadal. With 16 major titles won as the coach of his nephew Rafael Nadal, he was the most successful coach in tennis history until Marián Vajda and his player Novak Djokovic won their 17th major title together in 2020.

== Early life ==
Toni Nadal was born into a Spanish family and has two siblings, brothers. His younger brother Miguel became a professional football player for FC Barcelona. Toni Nadal tried participating in several sports including football, table tennis, and swimming. He achieved the title of junior champion of Balearic Islands in his table tennis career. He was the first of his siblings to play ground tennis when he started doing so at fourteen years old. Nadal was inspired to join the sport when he saw Ilie Năstase win the Barcelona Masters in 1972.

== Career ==
Toni Nadal worked as a tennis coach and as a manager for a tennis club. He obtained a trainer's degree and taught at the tennis club his brother Miguel was a member of in Manacor. Toni also became a manager of the Manacor tennis club while teaching younger students. At this time, Toni began coaching his nephew, Rafa Nadal. The majority of Toni Nadal's coaching career has been spent with Rafael.

In April 2021, Toni joined the coaching team of Canadian Félix Auger-Aliassime ahead of the clay-court season. However, Toni did not travel with Félix full-time, remaining the director of the Rafa Nadal Academy by Movistar. He split with Auger-Aliassime in 2024.

== Coaching style ==
Toni Nadal has described his coaching style as 'hard', saying that he occasionally puts too much pressure on Rafa, but that he does so because he wants him to succeed. When Rafa was younger, he would be nervous of having lessons by himself with Uncle Toni. Rafa stated that as a child he would sometimes return home from tennis lessons crying. Toni Nadal feels being such a hard coach would make his pupils better tennis players.

Toni required that his pupils show respect for their equipment, and stated that he would immediately stop coaching Rafa if he ever threw his racket out of frustration. Toni believes that throwing a tennis racket showed a lack of respect towards people who could not afford the same equipment and the sport itself.

Toni strives to teach players to be responsible for themselves. He trained Rafa on poor tennis courts with old tennis balls to show that it was not the equipment that would decide if he won or lost. He believed that losing was a fact of competing in sports and that the only one responsible for winning or losing was the player.

Toni had an authoritarian attitude with the players that he coached. He wanted his opinions to be important to players he was coaching rather than it just being advice. He did not want to be paid by Rafa because he believed that it would make him less of an important figure. Without being paid, he could say whatever he felt without a chance of Rafa being able to fire him like a regular coach.

== Success ==
Toni Nadal was the record holder of the most Grand Slam titles won as a coach with 16 until February 2, 2020, when Marián Vajda and Novak Djokovic won their 17th Grand Slam title together in the Australian Open, giving Vajda the sole possession of the top position in the history of tennis.

Toni Nadal previously assumed the lead on coaches' rank list with his 12th Grand Slam title as a coach on June 9, 2013, when Rafael Nadal defeated David Ferrer in the Roland Garros final in Paris, breaking a tie with Lennart Bergelin, coach of Björn Borg between 1974–1981.

== Calls for replacement ==
In 2015, after Rafa Nadal lost in the second round at Wimbledon to Dustin Brown, who was ranked No. 102 at the time, former world No. 1 John McEnroe said on BBC Radio 5 Live that the Spanish tennis star should "get a new damn coach". Rafa had failed to reach the semifinals at all four Grand Slam events that year. In February 2016, at the Buenos Aires Open, Toni admitted that Rafa would have probably already replaced him had he not been his uncle.

In December 2016, Rafa added countryman Carlos Moyá, a former world number one player, to work alongside Nadal as his coach. Toni Nadal was the first one to contact Moyá to see if he would be willing to join Rafa's coaching team, thinking it was the perfect time to include him. Moyá also planned to work with Nadal on projects with the Rafa Nadal Academy.

== Leaving Rafael Nadal's coaching team ==
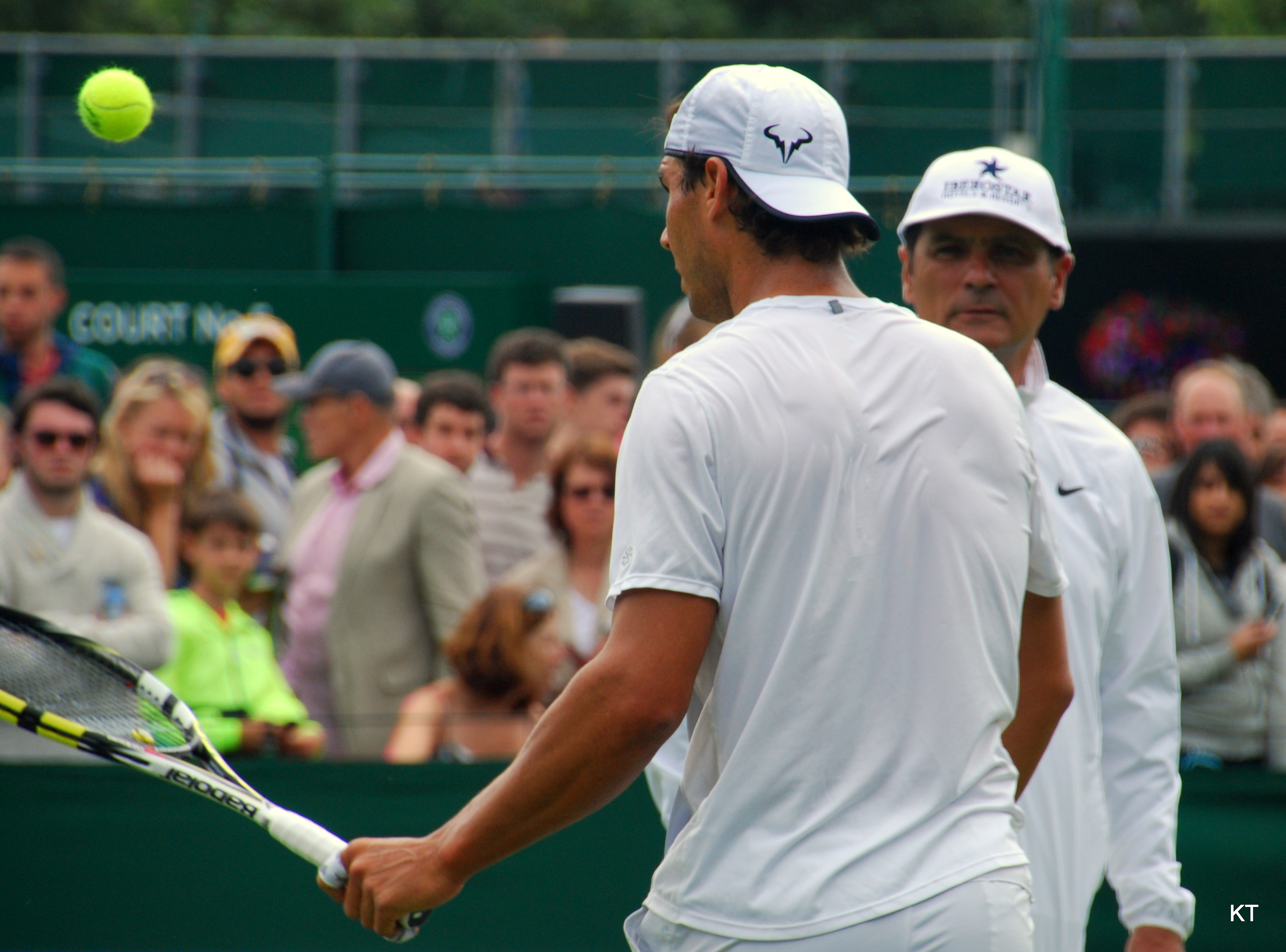
Toni Nadal coaching Rafael Nadal

In late February 2017, Toni Nadal announced he had decided to retire from his nephew's coaching staff. Toni Nadal had informed Moyá and his brother Sebastián (Rafa's father) of his intentions. Toni originally withheld the knowledge of his plans to separate from Rafa, who found out when the news was released to the press. Toni did not tell Rafa about his decision because he did not want to distract Rafa from playing tennis. Toni stated that he later regretted keeping this information from his nephew.

Toni shifted his focus to the Rafa Nadal Academy. He stated that he wants to work with younger players and develop their talent.

Rafa mentioned that he is happy to know his uncle (Toni) is doing what he wants and does not hold any resentment towards his departure. Rafa said he believed it was a good time for Toni to focus on projects like the Academy.
