= 2009 Australian Open – Men's singles =

Men's singles
- 2009 Australian Open

Final
- Champion: (Spain) Rafael Nadal
- Runner-up: (Switzerland) Roger Federer
- Score: 7–5, 3–6, 7–6^{(7–3)}, 3–6, 6–2

Details
- Draw: 128
- Seeds: 32

Events
| Singles | men | women | | boys | girls |
| Doubles | men | women | mixed | boys | girls |
| WC Singles | men | women | quad |
| WC Doubles | men | women | quad |
| Legends | men | women | mixed |
- Australian Open

Rafael Nadal defeated Roger Federer in the final, 7–5, 3–6, 7–6^{(7–3)}, 3–6, 6–2 to win the men's singles tennis title at the 2009 Australian Open. It was his first Australian Open title and his sixth major title overall. Nadal became the first Spaniard to win the title. It was Nadal's third victory over Federer in a major final in eight months, following wins at the 2008 French Open and 2008 Wimbledon Championships. By virtue of this win, Nadal became the first, and would remain the only, man to beat Federer on all 3 surfaces in grand slam finals.

Novak Djokovic was the defending champion, but retired due to heat stress in the quarterfinals against Andy Roddick.

The 2009 men's singles edition is considered to be one of the best majors in the Open Era. It is remembered for containing many of the best matches of the season, including the Nadal–Fernando Verdasco semifinal (lasting 5 hours and 14 minutes) and the final. It was also the first hard court major in which Nadal reached the final.

This tournament marked the final Australian Open appearance of 2005 champion Marat Safin, who was defeated in the third round by Federer.

== Seeds ==
1. (Spain) Rafael Nadal (champion)
2. (Switzerland) Roger Federer (final)
3. (Serbia) Novak Djokovic (quarterfinals, retired due to heat stress)
4. (United Kingdom) Andy Murray (fourth round)
5. (France) Jo-Wilfried Tsonga (quarterfinals)
6. (France) Gilles Simon (quarterfinals)
7. (United States) Andy Roddick (semifinals)
8. (Argentina) Juan Martín del Potro (quarterfinals)
9. (United States) James Blake (fourth round)
10. (Argentina) David Nalbandian (second round)
11. (Spain) David Ferrer (third round)
12. (France) Gaël Monfils (fourth round, retired due to a right wrist injury)
13. (Chile) Fernando González (fourth round)
14. (Spain) Fernando Verdasco (semifinals)
15. (Switzerland) Stan Wawrinka (third round)
16. (Sweden) Robin Söderling (second round)

17. (Spain) Nicolás Almagro (third round)
18. (Russia) Igor Andreev (third round)
19. (Croatia) Marin Čilić (fourth round)
20. (Czech Republic) Tomáš Berdych (fourth round)
21. (Spain) Tommy Robredo (fourth round)
22. (Czech Republic) Radek Štěpánek (third round)
23. (United States) Mardy Fish (third round)
24. (France) Richard Gasquet (third round)
25. (Croatia) Ivo Karlović (second round)
26. (Russia) Marat Safin (third round)
27. (Spain) Feliciano López (first round)
28. (France) Paul-Henri Mathieu (second round)
29. (Russia) Dmitry Tursunov (first round)
30. (Germany) Rainer Schüttler (first round)
31. (Austria) Jürgen Melzer (third round)
32. (Germany) Philipp Kohlschreiber (second round)

Click on the seed number of a player to go to their draw section.

== Draw ==
Key

- Q = Qualifier
- WC = Wild card
- LL = Lucky loser
- Alt = Alternate
- ITF = ITF entry
- PR = Protected ranking
- SR = Special ranking
- SE = Special exempt
- JE = Junior exempt
- JR = Junior Accelerator Programme entrant
- CO = College Accelerator Programme entrant
- NG = Next Gen Accelerator Program entrant
- w/o = Walkover
- r = Retired
- d = Defaulted

=== Finals ===
Quarterfinals
1 | (Spain) Rafael Nadal | 6 | 7 | 7
6 | (France) Gilles Simon | 2 | 5 | 5
14 | (Spain) Fernando Verdasco | 7^{7} | 3 | 6 | 6
5 | (France) Jo-Wilfried Tsonga | 6^{2} | 6 | 3 | 2
7 | (United States) Andy Roddick | 6^{3} | 6 | 6 | 2
3 | (Serbia) Novak Djokovic | 7^{7} | 4 | 2 | 1^{r}
8 | (Argentina) Juan Martín del Potro | 3 | 0 | 0
2 | (Switzerland) Roger Federer | 6 | 6 | 6

Semifinals
1 | (Spain) Rafael Nadal | 6^{4} | 6 | 7^{7} | 6^{1} | 6
14 | (Spain) Fernando Verdasco | 7^{7} | 4 | 6^{2} | 7^{7} | 4
7 | (United States) Andy Roddick | 2 | 5 | 5
2 | (Switzerland) Roger Federer | 6 | 7 | 7

Final
1 | (Spain) Rafael Nadal | 7 | 3 | 7^{7} | 3 | 6
2 | (Switzerland) Roger Federer | 5 | 6 | 6^{3} | 6 | 2

=== Top half ===
==== Section 1 ====
First round
1 | (Spain) R Nadal | 6 | 6 | 6
(Belgium) C Rochus | 0 | 2 | 2
(France) F Serra | 3 | 6 | 3 | 6 | 3
(Croatia) R Karanušić | 6 | 1 | 6 | 3 | 6
(Argentina) E Schwank | 3 | 3 | 4
(Germany) T Haas | 6 | 6 | 6
Q | (Italy) F Cipolla | 4 | 6 | 7^{9} | 7
29 | (Russia) D Tursunov | 6 | 2 | 6^{7} | 5
24 | (France) R Gasquet | 6^{5} | 7^{7} | 6 | 6
(Argentina) D Junqueira | 7^{7} | 6^{3} | 3 | 4
(United States) V Spadea | 2 | 5 | 4
WC | (Uzbekistan) D Istomin | 6 | 7 | 6
(Argentina) G Cañas | 3 | 7 | 5 | 6 | 7
Q | (Germany) D Kindlmann | 6 | 5 | 7 | 0 | 5
(Australia) L Hewitt | 7 | 2 | 2 | 6 | 3
13 | (Chile) F González | 5 | 6 | 6 | 3 | 6

Second round
1 | (Spain) R Nadal | 6 | 6 | 6
(Croatia) R Karanušić | 2 | 3 | 2
(Germany) T Haas | 6 | 6 | 6
Q | (Italy) F Cipolla | 1 | 2 | 1
24 | (France) R Gasquet | 6 | 6 | 6
WC | (Uzbekistan) D Istomin | 3 | 4 | 4
(Argentina) G Cañas | 5 | 3 | 4
13 | (Chile) F González | 7 | 6 | 6

Third round
1 | (Spain) R Nadal | 6 | 6 | 6
(Germany) T Haas | 4 | 2 | 2
24 | (France) R Gasquet | 6 | 6 | 6^{10} | 2 | 10
13 | (Chile) F González | 3 | 3 | 7^{12} | 6 | 12

Fourth round
1 | (Spain) R Nadal | 6 | 6 | 6
13 | (Chile) F González | 3 | 2 | 4

==== Section 2 ====
First round
12 | (France) G Monfils | 6 | 6 | 7
(Argentina) M Vassallo Argüello | 1 | 3 | 5
(Russia) M Youzhny | 3 | 2 | 2
PR | (Austria) S Koubek | 6 | 6 | 6
(Kazakhstan) A Golubev | 6 | 6^{7} | 4 | 2
(Italy) F Fognini | 3 | 7^{9} | 6 | 6
(Chile) N Massú | 4 | 4 | 6 | 7 | 3
17 | (Spain) N Almagro | 6 | 6 | 3 | 5 | 6
25 | (Croatia) I Karlović | 6 | 6 | 6
(Spain) D Gimeno-Traver | 3 | 4 | 4
Q | (United States) W Odesnik | 5 | 4 | 6 | 2
(Croatia) M Ančić | 7 | 6 | 4 | 6
(Australia) C Guccione | 6 | 6 | 6
(France) N Devilder | 4 | 2 | 4
(Spain) P Andújar | 4 | 1 | 1
6 | (France) G Simon | 6 | 6 | 6

Second round
12 | (France) G Monfils | 6 | 6 | 3 | 6
PR | (Austria) S Koubek | 2 | 4 | 6 | 2
(Italy) F Fognini | 2 | 5 | 0
17 | (Spain) N Almagro | 6 | 7 | 6
25 | (Croatia) I Karlović | 7 | 5 | 6 | 4 | 3
(Croatia) M Ančić | 5 | 7 | 4 | 6 | 6
(Australia) C Guccione | 7^{7} | 4 | 1 | 2
6 | (France) G Simon | 6^{5} | 6 | 6 | 6

Third round
12 | (France) G Monfils | 6 | 6 | 7
17 | (Spain) N Almagro | 4 | 3 | 5
(Croatia) M Ančić | 6^{2} | 4 | 2
6 | (France) G Simon | 7^{7} | 6 | 6

Fourth round
12 | (France) G Monfils | 4 | 6 | 1 | 0^{r}
6 | (France) G Simon | 6 | 2 | 6 | 0

==== Section 3 ====
First round
4 | (United Kingdom) A Murray | 6 | 3
PR | (Romania) A Pavel | 2 | 1^{r}
(Russia) T Gabashvili | 4 | 6^{3} | 6 | 0
(Spain) M Granollers | 6 | 7^{7} | 4 | 6
Q | (Germany) A Beck | 7 | 6 | 6
WC | (Australia) C Ebelthite | 5 | 1 | 0
(Japan) K Nishikori | 5 | 2 | 1
31 | (Austria) J Melzer | 7 | 6 | 6
22 | (Czech Republic) R Štěpánek | 3 | 6 | 6 | 6
(Ecuador) N Lapentti | 6 | 3 | 4 | 4
Q | (Germany) M Berrer | 6 | 6 | 6
WC | (Australia) C Ball | 2 | 4 | 3
(Ukraine) S Stakhovsky | 3 | 6 | 6 | 2 | 1
(France) A Clément | 6 | 2 | 4 | 6 | 6
WC | (France) A Mannarino | 0 | 2 | 2
14 | (Spain) F Verdasco | 6 | 6 | 6

Second round
4 | (United Kingdom) A Murray | 6 | 6 | 6
(Spain) M Granollers | 4 | 2 | 2
Q | (Germany) A Beck | 7 | 6^{7} | 4 | 3
31 | (Austria) J Melzer | 5 | 7^{9} | 6 | 6
22 | (Czech Republic) R Štěpánek | 6 | 6 | 6^{3} | 7
Q | (Germany) M Berrer | 3 | 2 | 7^{7} | 5
(France) A Clément | 1 | 1 | 2
14 | (Spain) F Verdasco | 6 | 6 | 6

Third round
4 | (United Kingdom) A Murray | 7 | 6 | 6
31 | (Austria) J Melzer | 5 | 0 | 3
22 | (Czech Republic) R Štěpánek | 4 | 0 | 0
14 | (Spain) F Verdasco | 6 | 6 | 6

Fourth round
4 | (United Kingdom) A Murray | 6 | 1 | 6 | 3 | 4
14 | (Spain) F Verdasco | 2 | 6 | 1 | 6 | 6

==== Section 4 ====
First round
9 | (United States) J Blake | 6 | 6 | 7
LL | (Canada) F Dancevic | 4 | 3 | 5
Q | (France) S de Chaunac | 2 | 6 | 0 | 6 | 6
(Belgium) S Darcis | 6 | 3 | 6 | 2 | 2
(Spain) A Montañés | 3 | 2 | 3
(Latvia) E Gulbis | 6 | 6 | 6
Q | (Canada) P Polansky | 7 | 6 | 4 | 3 | 4
18 | (Russia) I Andreev | 5 | 3 | 6 | 6 | 6
30 | (Germany) R Schüttler | 6 | 2 | 4 | 4
Q | (Israel) D Sela | 1 | 6 | 6 | 6
(Romania) V Hănescu | 3 | 3 | 7^{9} | 7^{7} | 8
(Czech Republic) J Hernych | 6 | 6 | 6^{7} | 6^{4} | 6
(Croatia) I Ljubičić | 4 | 7^{7} | 7^{9} | 5 | 6
(Russia) I Kunitsyn | 6 | 6^{3} | 6^{7} | 7 | 3
(Argentina) J Mónaco | 4 | 4 | 0
5 | (France) J-W Tsonga | 6 | 6 | 6

Second round
9 | (United States) J Blake | 6 | 6 | 6
Q | (France) S de Chaunac | 3 | 2 | 3
(Latvia) E Gulbis | 4 | 4 | 7 | 6 | 4
18 | (Russia) I Andreev | 6 | 6 | 5 | 3 | 6
Q | (Israel) D Sela | 6 | 6 | 6
(Romania) V Hănescu | 3 | 3 | 2
(Croatia) I Ljubičić | 7^{7} | 6^{8} | 6^{7} | 2
5 | (France) J-W Tsonga | 6^{4} | 7^{10} | 7^{9} | 6

Third round
9 | (United States) J Blake | 6 | 6 | 3 | 6
18 | (Russia) I Andreev | 3 | 2 | 6 | 1
Q | (Israel) D Sela | 4 | 2 | 6 | 1
5 | (France) J-W Tsonga | 6 | 6 | 1 | 6

Fourth round
9 | (United States) J Blake | 4 | 4 | 6^{3}
5 | (France) J-W Tsonga | 6 | 6 | 7^{7}

=== Bottom half ===
==== Section 5 ====
First round
7 | (United States) A Roddick | 6 | 6 | 6
Q | (Sweden) B Rehnquist | 0 | 2 | 2
Q | (Belgium) X Malisse | 7^{10} | 6 | 6
(France) M Llodra | 6^{8} | 1 | 1
(Spain) JC Ferrero | 3 | 2 | 7^{7} | 2
(France) F Santoro | 6 | 6 | 6^{5} | 6
(United States) S Querrey | 6^{6} | 3 | 2
32 | (Germany) P Kohlschreiber | 7^{8} | 6 | 6
21 | (Spain) T Robredo | 6 | 7 | 6
(United States) B Reynolds | 2 | 5 | 1
(Spain) A Martín | 3 | 6 | 2 | 4
(Serbia) V Troicki | 6 | 3 | 6 | 6
(Brazil) T Bellucci | 3 | 5 | 4
(Chinese Taipei) Y-h Lu | 6 | 7 | 6
(France) M Gicquel | 1 | 6 | 2 | 3
10 | (Argentina) D Nalbandian | 6 | 4 | 6 | 6

Second round
7 | (United States) A Roddick | 4 | 6 | 7^{7} | 6
Q | (Belgium) X Malisse | 6 | 2 | 6^{1} | 2
(France) F Santoro | 5 | 7 | 3 | 7 | 6
32 | (Germany) P Kohlschreiber | 7 | 5 | 6 | 5 | 3
21 | (Spain) T Robredo | 6 | 6 | 6
(Serbia) V Troicki | 1 | 3 | 0
(Chinese Taipei) Y-h Lu | 6 | 5 | 4 | 6 | 6
10 | (Argentina) D Nalbandian | 4 | 7 | 6 | 4 | 2

Third round
7 | (United States) A Roddick | 6 | 6 | 6
(France) F Santoro | 3 | 4 | 2
21 | (Spain) T Robredo | 6 | 6 | 6
(Chinese Taipei) Y-h Lu | 1 | 3 | 2

Fourth round
7 | (United States) A Roddick | 7 | 6 | 6
21 | (Spain) T Robredo | 5 | 1 | 3

==== Section 6 ====
First round
16 | (Sweden) R Söderling | 5 | 6 | 6 | 7
(United States) R Kendrick | 7 | 4 | 4 | 5
(France) J Benneteau | 3 | 6^{5} | 2
(Cyprus) M Baghdatis | 6 | 7^{7} | 6
(Italy) S Bolelli | 7^{7} | 7^{7} | 7
(Belgium) K Vliegen | 6^{5} | 6^{3} | 5
WC | (Australia) S Groth | 7^{7} | 4 | 5 | 0
23 | (United States) M Fish | 6^{3} | 6 | 7 | 6
28 | (France) P-H Mathieu | 6 | 4
(Finland) J Nieminen | 2 | 1^{r}
PR | (United States) T Dent | 4 | 6 | 6 | 3 | 4
LL | (United States) A Delić | 6 | 3 | 4 | 6 | 6
(France) J Chardy | 6 | 6 | 6
(Brazil) M Daniel | 4 | 4 | 1
Q | (Italy) A Stoppini | 2 | 3 | 5
3 | (Serbia) N Djokovic | 6 | 6 | 7

Second round
16 | (Sweden) R Söderling | 6 | 5 | 3 | 3
(Cyprus) M Baghdatis | 3 | 7 | 6 | 6
(Italy) S Bolelli | 4 | 1 | 5
23 | (United States) M Fish | 6 | 6 | 7
28 | (France) P-H Mathieu | 6 | 6 | 3 | 6^{3} | 7
LL | (United States) A Delić | 1 | 3 | 6 | 7^{7} | 9
(France) J Chardy | 5 | 1 | 3
3 | (Serbia) N Djokovic | 7 | 6 | 6

Third round
(Cyprus) M Baghdatis | 6 | 6 | 6
23 | (United States) M Fish | 2 | 4 | 4
LL | (United States) A Delić | 2 | 6 | 3 | 6^{4}
3 | (Serbia) N Djokovic | 6 | 4 | 6 | 7^{7}

Fourth round
(Cyprus) M Baghdatis | 1 | 6^{1} | 7^{7} | 2
3 | (Serbia) N Djokovic | 6 | 7^{7} | 6^{5} | 6

==== Section 7 ====
First round
8 | (Argentina) JM del Potro | 6 | 6 | 6
(Germany) M Zverev | 3 | 4 | 2
Q | (Algeria) L Ouahab | 2 | 1 | 2
Q | (Germany) F Mayer | 6 | 6 | 6
(Italy) P Starace | 6^{5} | 6 | 6^{5} | 6^{6}
WC | (Australia) B Tomic | 7^{7} | 1 | 7^{7} | 7^{8}
(Luxembourg) G Müller | 6 | 7^{7} | 4 | 4 | 16
27 | (Spain) F López | 3 | 6^{5} | 6 | 6 | 14
19 | (Croatia) M Čilić | 6 | 6 | 6^{4} | 6
(South Africa) K Anderson | 3 | 2 | 7^{7} | 3
(Spain) Ó Hernández | 6 | 1 | 3 | 6 | 0
(Serbia) J Tipsarević | 4 | 6 | 6 | 4 | 6
Q | (Slovakia) D Hrbatý | 7^{7} | 2 | 6 | 7
WC | (United States) J Isner | 6^{4} | 6 | 2 | 5
(Germany) D Gremelmayr | 1 | 7^{8} | 1 | 7^{7} | 4
11 | (Spain) D Ferrer | 6 | 6^{6} | 6 | 6^{5} | 6

Second round
8 | (Argentina) JM del Potro | 6 | 7 | 6
Q | (Germany) F Mayer | 1 | 5 | 2
WC | (Australia) B Tomic | 6 | 1 | 4 | 2
(Luxembourg) G Müller | 3 | 6 | 6 | 6
19 | (Croatia) M Čilić | 6 | 6 | 4 | 6
(Serbia) J Tipsarević | 2 | 3 | 6 | 3
Q | (Slovakia) D Hrbatý | 2 | 2 | 1
11 | (Spain) D Ferrer | 6 | 6 | 6

Third round
8 | (Argentina) JM del Potro | 6^{5} | 7 | 6 | 7
(Luxembourg) G Müller | 7^{7} | 5 | 3 | 5
19 | (Croatia) M Čilić | 7^{7} | 6 | 6
11 | (Spain) D Ferrer | 6^{5} | 3 | 4

Fourth round
8 | (Argentina) JM del Potro | 5 | 6 | 6 | 6
19 | (Croatia) M Čilić | 7 | 4 | 4 | 2

==== Section 8 ====
First round
15 | (Switzerland) S Wawrinka | 6 | 2 | 7 | 7^{11}
(Czech Republic) I Minář | 1 | 6 | 5 | 6^{9}
Q | (Germany) B Phau | 4 | 3 | 6 | 3
WC | (Australia) B Klein | 6 | 6 | 4 | 6
(Argentina) B Dabul | 6 | 6 | 6
(Germany) P Petzschner | 1 | 2 | 4
(United States) R Ginepri | 4 | 4 | 3
20 | (Czech Republic) T Berdych | 6 | 6 | 6
26 | (Russia) M Safin | 6 | 6 | 6
(Spain) I Navarro | 3 | 3 | 4
(Spain) G García-López | 3 | 7^{7} | 6 | 6
(Argentina) A Calleri | 6 | 6^{5} | 2 | 0
Q | (Russia) E Korolev | 6 | 6 | 7^{9}
(Spain) C Moyá | 3 | 1 | 6^{7}
(Italy) A Seppi | 1 | 6^{4} | 5
2 | (Switzerland) R Federer | 6 | 7^{7} | 7

Second round
15 | (Switzerland) S Wawrinka | 6 | 6 | 6
WC | (Australia) B Klein | 3 | 4 | 4
(Argentina) B Dabul | 1 | 1 | 3
20 | (Czech Republic) T Berdych | 6 | 6 | 6
26 | (Russia) M Safin | 7 | 6 | 6
(Spain) G García-López | 5 | 2 | 2
Q | (Russia) E Korolev | 2 | 3 | 1
2 | (Switzerland) R Federer | 6 | 6 | 6

Third round
15 | (Switzerland) S Wawrinka | 6 | 1 | 3 | 4
20 | (Czech Republic) T Berdych | 4 | 6 | 6 | 6
26 | (Russia) M Safin | 3 | 2 | 6^{5}
2 | (Switzerland) R Federer | 6 | 6 | 7^{7}

Fourth round
20 | (Czech Republic) T Berdych | 6 | 7^{7} | 4 | 4 | 2
2 | (Switzerland) R Federer | 4 | 6^{4} | 6 | 6 | 6

| Preceded by 2008 US Open – Men's singles | Grand Slam men's singles | Succeeded by 2009 French Open – Men's singles |
