= 2008 Wimbledon Championships – Men's singles final =

Wimbledon 2008 Men's Final
- (Switzerland) Roger Federer (1) vs. (Spain) Rafael Nadal (2)
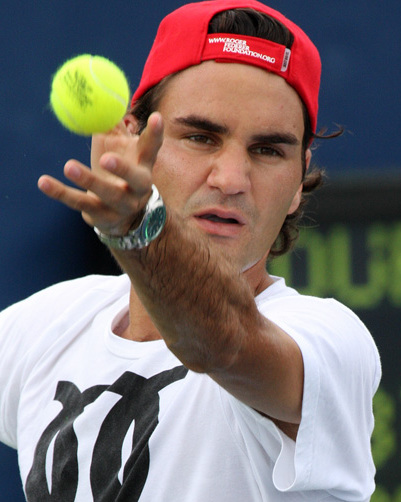
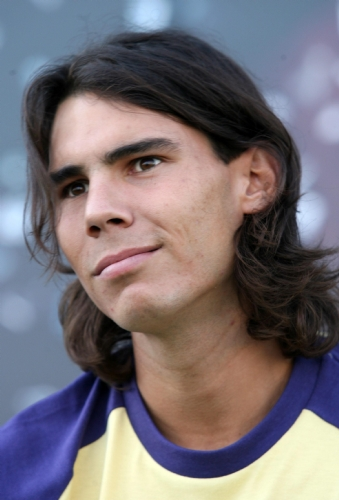
- Roger Federer (left) and Rafael Nadal (right)
Set	1	2	3	4	5
(Switzerland) Roger Federer	4	4	7^{7}	7^{10}	7
(Spain) Rafael Nadal	6	6	6^{5}	6^{8}	9
- Date: 6 July 2008
- Tournament: The Championships, Wimbledon
- Location: Centre Court, All England Lawn Tennis and Croquet Club, Wimbledon, London, England
- Chair umpire: Pascal Maria
- Duration: 4 hours 48 minutes

The 2008 Wimbledon Championships Men's Singles final was the championship tennis match of the men's singles tournament at the 2008 Wimbledon Championships. A part of the Federer–Nadal rivalry, it pitted then-top ranked Roger Federer against then second-ranked Rafael Nadal. After 4 hours and 48 minutes of play, Nadal defeated Federer 6–4, 6–4, 6–7^{(5–7)}, 6–7^{(8–10)}, 9–7. Due to the quality of play and the involvement of two of the greatest players ever, this final is regarded by many as the greatest tennis match ever played. (Note: See:)

== Background ==
Between 2004 and 2019, Roger Federer and Rafael Nadal had an intense rivalry that many contemporaries considered to be among the greatest in tennis history. As they entered the 2008 Wimbledon Championships, the two men had combined to win 14 of the previous 16 Grand Slam titles (10 by Federer, 4 by Nadal).

The 2008 final was the third consecutive year in which Federer and Nadal had met in the championship match of Wimbledon. Federer had won not only both previous meetings, but had been the reigning Wimbledon champion since 2003. Federer’s five consecutive titles (2003–2007) were a record shared with Björn Borg. Federer was also looking to equal Borg's record of 41 consecutive match wins at Wimbledon, a record dating back to 1981. Federer had an overall active streak of 65 consecutive match wins on grass, dating back to June 2003, which still remains the longest tour-level grass-court winning streak for a male player in the Open Era. At Wimbledon 2008, Federer was attempting to surpass Borg's record by becoming the first male player in the Open Era to win six consecutive Wimbledon titles, and the first since William Renshaw in 1886. Nadal had recently won his fourth French Open (all in succession), defeating Federer comprehensively in their third consecutive final of that tournament. The Spaniard was attempting to complete the French Open–Wimbledon double ("Channel Slam"); this feat was known to be extremely difficult because it required the player to make the switch from a slower clay surface to a faster grass surface within a fortnight. In the Open Era, only two men had previously achieved this feat: Rod Laver (1969) and Björn Borg (1978, 1979 & 1980).

The physical fitness of both players was under question heading into this final. Federer had contracted mononucleosis in December 2007, and received medical clearance to train normally and compete on 20 February 2008. Some analysts wondered whether his physical recovery was complete by the time of Wimbledon. Others disagreed, opining that the vestiges of Federer's fatigue were no longer visible during the 2008 clay court season. On the other hand, in an interview for Movistar, Nadal stated that his foot was severely injured, requiring anesthesia before the match, and "had to play with my foot asleep".

== Match details ==
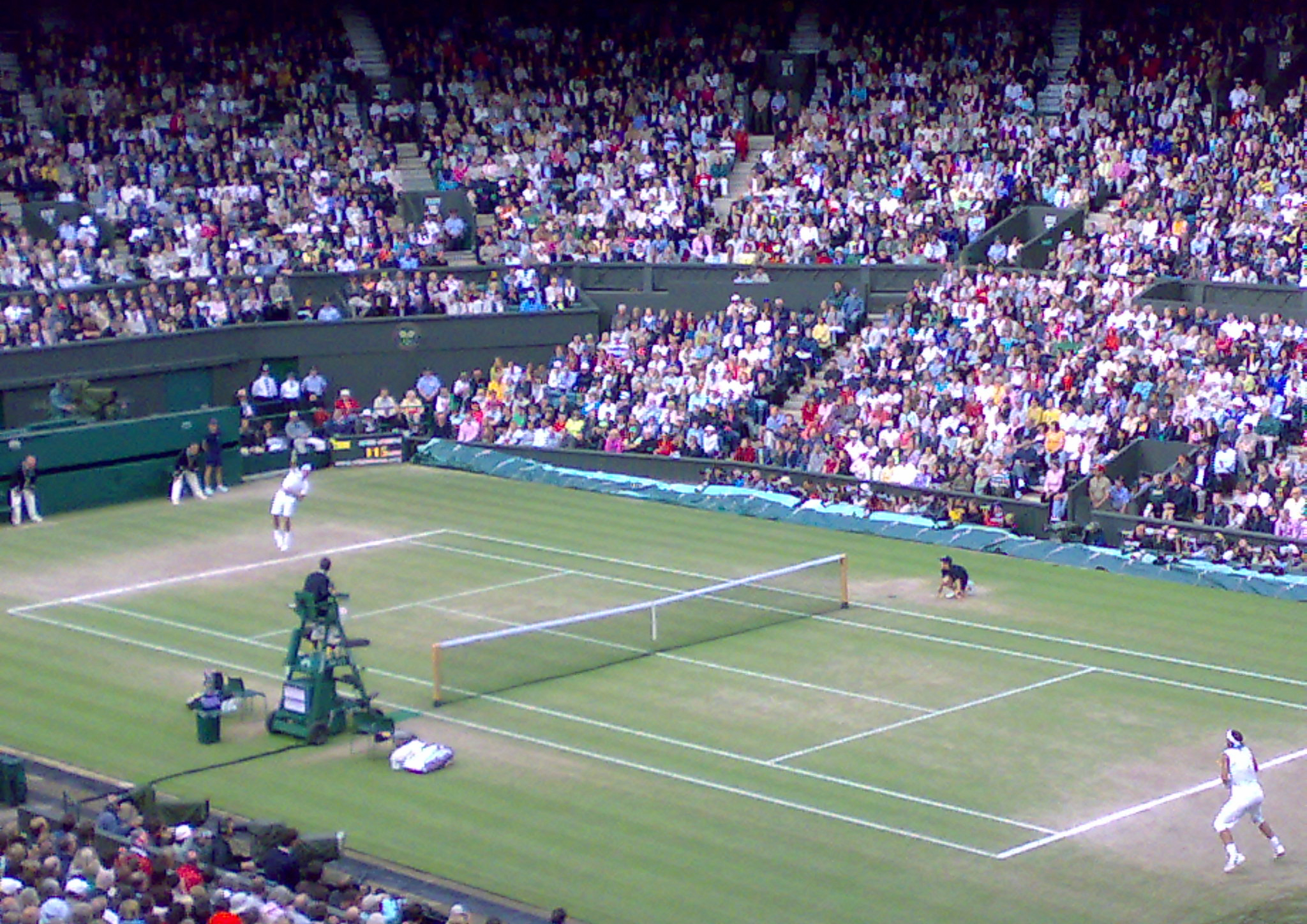
Federer serving for the third set against Nadal in the Wimbledon final

Although the players were due on court at 14:00 BST on 6 July 2008, rain delayed the start of the match by about 35 minutes. The umpire was Pascal Maria.

Nadal won the first two sets 6–4, 6–4 (he won the second set by winning 5 consecutive games after trailing 1–4), and had triple break point at 3–3, 0–40 on Federer's serve in the third set. Federer won five consecutive points and held serve. A few minutes later rain stopped play once again, with Federer leading in the third set 5–4. After an 80-minute break for the weather, Federer battled back to win the next two sets, 7–6, 7–6, saving two championship points in the fourth set tiebreak. That fourth set tiebreak is widely regarded as one of the greatest ever played. With the score at 5–2, Nadal had the opportunity to win the title on his next two serves. However, he double faulted, then netted a backhand, bringing the tiebreak back on serve. Nadal saved a set point and had his first championship point, but failed to return Federer's serve. At 7–7, Nadal hit a seemingly impossible forehand down the line past Federer, setting up another championship point, this time on his serve, but Federer responded with an equally remarkable backhand down the line to extend the match. BBC commentator Andrew Castle said, "The two best passing shots of the tournament, without doubt, have just taken place on the last two points." A second rain delay at 19:53 BST kept the players in the locker room for another 30 minutes. When they returned onto the court, darkness had already started setting in, threatening to delay the match until the next day. During the deciding set, Federer was two points away from claiming his sixth consecutive Wimbledon crown, but Nadal ultimately held serve and eventually broke Federer's serve in the 15th game of the set. Nadal then served out the match in the following game and won the final set 9–7, claiming his first Wimbledon and fifth Grand Slam tournament singles title. The match ended in near darkness at 21:15 BST.

During the match, Federer only converted one of thirteen break points on Nadal's serve.

It was the last Wimbledon final to be significantly affected by rain, as a retractable roof was being installed at Centre Court and was in place by the 2009 Wimbledon Championships.

== Statistics ==
Category	(Switzerland) Federer	(Spain) Nadal
1st serve %	65%	73%
Aces	25	6
Double faults	2	3
Winners	89	60
Unforced errors (UFE)	52	27
Winner-UFE	+37	+33
Winning % on 1st serve	73%	69%
Winning % on 2nd serve	57%	59%
Receiving points won	33%	33%
Break point conversions	1/13 (7%)	4/13 (30%)
Net approaches won	42/75 (56%)	22/31 (71%)
Total points won	204	209
Fastest serve	129 mph (208 km/h)	126 mph (203 km/h)
Average 1st serve speed	117 mph (188 km/h)	112 mph (180 km/h)
Average 2nd serve speed	100 mph (160 km/h)	93 mph (150 km/h)

== Significance ==
At 4 hours and 48 minutes, the match at the time was the longest singles final at Wimbledon in terms of time played. It was overtaken by the 2019 men's singles final (4 hours and 57 minutes), another match involving Federer, in which he lost to Novak Djokovic.

Nadal defeated Federer at his most successful major and ended his 40-match winning streak at Wimbledon: his last defeat was to Mario Ancic at the 2002 tournament. By winning the match, Nadal achieved the rare French Open–Wimbledon double ("Channel Slam"), joining Rod Laver and Björn Borg as the only men to do so in the Open Era at the time.

43 days following the final, after a record 160 consecutive weeks spent as world no. 2, Nadal finally overtook Federer in the ATP rankings, ending Federer's record 237 consecutive weeks as world no. 1. Some tennis analysts questioned whether 2008 was the beginning of Federer's decline (in favour of the younger Nadal). Federer, however, regained the top ranking on three occasions after this loss; after winning Wimbledon in 2009 and 2012, and the Rotterdam Open in 2018. Federer also made the finals of the next six consecutive Grand Slam tournaments, winning four: 2008 US Open (won), 2009 Australian Open (finalist), 2009 French Open (won), 2009 Wimbledon (won), 2009 US Open (finalist), and 2010 Australian Open (won). In contrast, Nadal only made one Grand Slam final during this period, defeating Federer in the 2009 Australian Open final. Federer won a further four majors later in his career, between 2012-18, before retiring in 2022. He ended his career with a total of 20 Grand Slams. Nadal, in turn, went onto to win a total of 22 Grand Slams — and holding the number 1 ranking on several occasions — before his retirement in November 2024. Thus, Nadal and Federer have a combined Grand Slam total of 42, with 25 coming after the 2008 final (17:8 in favour of Nadal).
