= Novak Djokovic =

Serbian tennis player (born 1987)

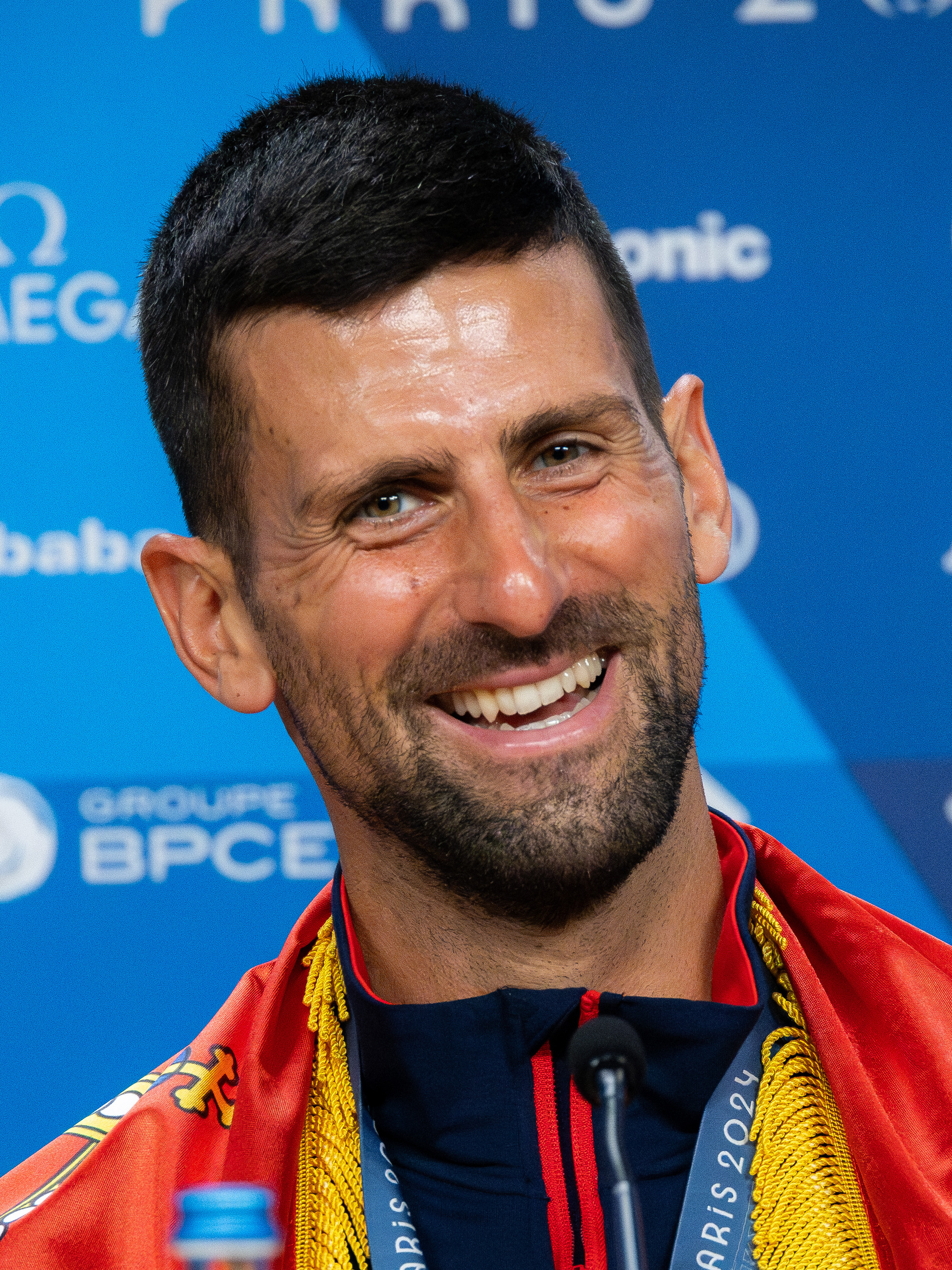
- Djokovic at the 2024 Olympic Games
- Native name: Новак Ђоковић; Novak Đoković / Novak Djoković
- Country (sports): Serbia and Montenegro (2003–2006); Serbia (2006–present)
- Residence: Athens, Greece
- Born: 22 May 1987 (age 39) Belgrade, SR Serbia, Yugoslavia
- Height: 1.88 m (6 ft 2 in)
- Turned pro: 2003
- Plays: Right-handed (two-handed backhand)
- Coach: Boris Bošnjaković; Viktor Troicki
- Prize money: US $197,006,276: 1st all-time in earnings
- Official website: novakdjokovic.com

Singles
- Career record: 1184–243 (83.0%)
- Career titles: 102 (3rd in the Open Era)
- Highest ranking: No. 1 (4 July 2011)
- Current ranking: No. 12 (9 November 2026)

Grand Slam singles results
- Australian Open: W (2008, 2011, 2012, 2013, 2015, 2016, 2019, 2020, 2021, 2023)
- French Open: W (2016, 2021, 2023)
- Wimbledon: W (2011, 2014, 2015, 2018, 2019, 2021, 2022)
- US Open: W (2011, 2015, 2018, 2023)

Other tournaments
- Tour Finals: W (2008, 2012, 2013, 2014, 2015, 2022, 2023)
- Olympic Games: W (2024)

Doubles
- Career record: 67–83
- Career titles: 1
- Highest ranking: No. 114 (30 November 2009)
- Current ranking: No. 572 (2 November 2026)

Grand Slam doubles results
- Australian Open: 1R (2006, 2007)
- French Open: 1R (2006)
- Wimbledon: 2R (2006)
- US Open: 1R (2006)

Other doubles tournaments
- Olympic Games: 2R (2016)

Grand Slam mixed doubles results
- US Open: 1R (2025, 2026)

Other mixed doubles tournaments
- Olympic Games: SF – 4th (2021)

Team competitions
- Davis Cup: W (2010)
- Hopman Cup: F (2008, 2013)

President of the ATP Player Council
- In office 30 August 2016 – 30 August 2020
- Vice President: Kevin Anderson
- Preceded by: Eric Butorac
- Succeeded by: Kevin Anderson
Medal record
Representing Serbia
Olympic Games
Gold medal – first place	2024 Paris	Singles
Bronze medal – third place	2008 Beijing	Singles
- Last updated on: 9 November 2026.

Novak Djokovic (Note: Serbian: Новак Ђоковић, romanized: Novak Đoković, pronounced [nôvaːk dʑôːkovitɕ]. The simplified Serbian Latin spelling of his name, also used in some English-language media, is "Novak Djoković".) (born 22 May 1987) is a Serbian professional tennis player. He has been ranked as the world No. 1 in men's singles by the Association of Tennis Professionals (ATP) for a record 428 weeks, finished as the year-end No. 1 a record eight times, and has been ranked No. 1 at least once in a year for a record 13 different years. Djokovic has won 102 ATP Tour–level singles titles, including a record 24 majors (including a record ten Australian Open titles), a record 40 Masters titles, a record seven year-end championships, and an Olympic gold medal. Djokovic is the only man in tennis history to be the reigning champion of all four majors at once across three different surfaces. In singles, he is the only man to achieve a triple Career Grand Slam, and the first player to complete a Career Golden Masters, and the only player to accomplish it twice. Djokovic is the only player in singles to have won all of the Big Titles over the course of his career.

Djokovic began his professional career in 2003. In 2008, at age 20, he disrupted Roger Federer and Rafael Nadal's streak of 11 consecutive majors by winning his first major title at the Australian Open. By 2010, Djokovic had begun to separate himself from the rest of the field and, as a result, the trio of Federer, Nadal, and Djokovic was referred to as the "Big Three" among fans and commentators, and the Big Four, including Andy Murray, creating a Golden Era of men's tennis. In 2011, Djokovic ascended to No. 1 for the first time, winning three majors and a then-record five Masters titles while going 10–1 against Nadal and Federer. He remained the most successful player in men's tennis for the rest of the decade. Djokovic had his most successful season in 2015, reaching a record 15 consecutive finals and winning 10 Big Titles while earning 31 victories over top-10 players. His dominant run extended through to the 2016 French Open, where he completed the Career Grand Slam and a non-calendar year Grand Slam, becoming the first man since Rod Laver in 1969 to hold all four majors simultaneously and setting a rankings points record of 16,950.

In 2017, Djokovic suffered from an elbow injury that weakened his results until the 2018 Wimbledon Championships, where he won the title while ranked No. 21 in the world. Djokovic then returned to a dominant status, winning 11 more major titles and completing his second and third Career Grand Slams. Due to his opposition to the COVID-19 vaccine mandate, he skipped many tournaments in 2022, notably the Australian Open and the US Open, being deported from the country in the former case. One year after the Australian visa controversy, he made a successful comeback to reclaim the 2023 Australian Open trophy, and shortly after claimed the all-time record for most men's singles majors titles. In 2024, he became the only player to complete a career sweep of the Big Titles.

Djokovic was awarded the Laureus World Sportsman of the Year five times in 2012, 2015, 2016, 2019, and 2024, which is tied with Roger Federer for the most of all time. He was named one of Time's 100 most influential people in the world in 2012 and was listed by Forbes as one of the world's ten highest-paid athletes in 2016.

Representing Serbia, Djokovic led the national tennis team to the Davis Cup crown in 2010 and the ATP Cup crown in 2020. In singles, he won the gold medal at the 2024 Paris Olympics and the bronze medal at the 2008 Beijing Olympics. He is a recipient of the Order of Karađorđe's Star, Order of St. Sava, and the Order of the Republika Srpska. He has been named the BTA Best Balkan Athlete of the Year a record eight times.

Beyond competition, Djokovic was elected as the president of the ATP Player Council in 2016. He stepped down in 2020 to front a new player-only tennis association, the Professional Tennis Players Association (PTPA), which he co-founded with Vasek Pospisil, citing the need for players to have more influence on the tour and advocating better prize money structure for lower-ranked players. Djokovic is an active philanthropist. He is the founder of the Novak Djokovic Foundation, which is committed to supporting children from disadvantaged communities. Djokovic was appointed a UNICEF Goodwill Ambassador in 2015.

== Early and personal life ==
Novak Djokovic was born on 22 May 1987 in Belgrade, SR Serbia, SFR Yugoslavia, to Dijana (née Žagar) and Srdjan Djokovic. He is of paternal Serbian and maternal Croatian descent. His two younger brothers, Marko and Djordje, have also played professional tennis.

Djokovic began playing tennis at the age of four, after his parents gave him a mini-racket and a soft foam ball, which his father said became "the most beloved toy in his life". His parents then sent him to a tennis camp in Novi Sad. In the summer of 1993, as a six-year-old, he met Jelena Genčić at a tennis camp she was overseeing at Mount Kopaonik, where Djokovic's parents ran a fast-food parlour. Genčić worked with Djokovic over the next six years, convincing him to hit his backhand with two hands instead of the single hand used by his role model, Pete Sampras. Djokovic has credited Genčić for "shaping my mind as a human being, but also as a professional".

During the Yugoslav Wars in the late 1990s, Serbia had to endure embargoes and NATO bombings because of the Kosovo War. At one point, Djokovic had to train inside a disused swimming pool converted into a tennis court. Due to his rapid development, Genčić contacted Nikola Pilić, and in September 1999, Djokovic moved to the Pilić tennis academy in Oberschleißheim, Germany, spending four years there. Pilić made him spend several months serving against a wall to improve his technique, and he had him doing wrist flexibility exercises for a year with a rubber exercise band.

His father also took him to train at academies in the United States, Italy, and Germany. Because of the high cost of traveling and training his father took out high-interest loans to help pay for his son's tennis education, putting Djokovic under immense pressure to deliver.

He met his future wife, Jelena Ristić, in high school, and began dating her in 2005. They became engaged in September 2013, and on 10 July 2014 the couple married on Montenegro's Sveti Stefan island, in the Serbian Orthodox Church of Saint Stephen (Serbian: Црква Светог Архиђакона Стефана). He and Ristić had their first child, a boy, in October 2014. Their daughter was born in 2017.

Djokovic is a self-described fan of languages, speaking Serbian, English, French, German, Italian, and Spanish to varying levels of proficiency.

== Career ==
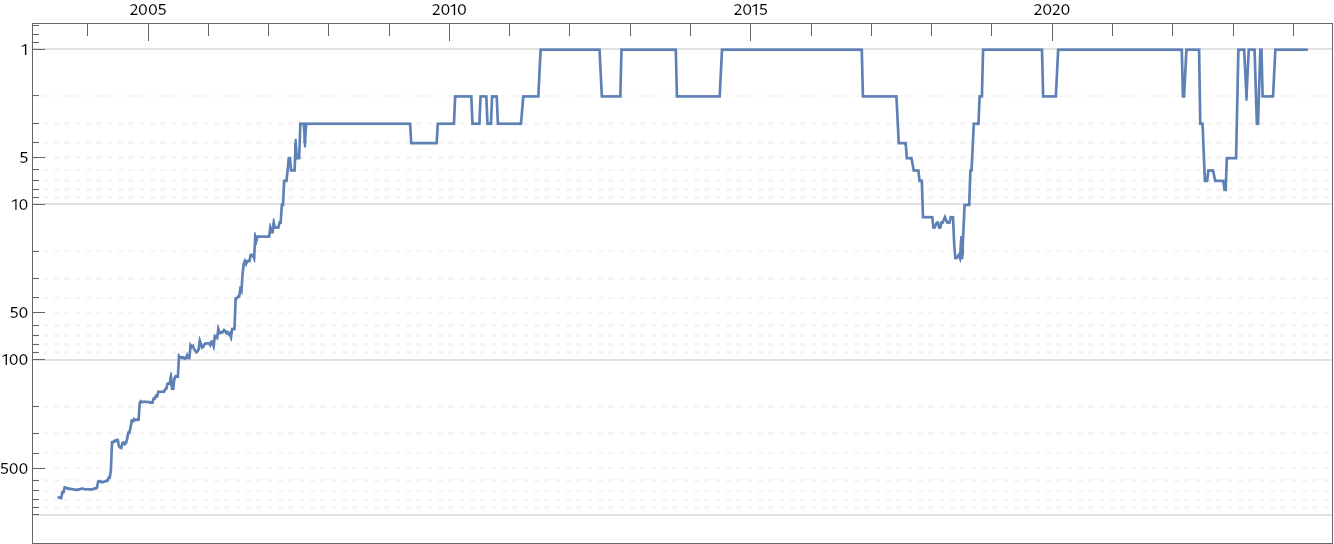
Novak Djokovic singles ranking history chart

=== 2000s ===
==== 2001–2003: Juniors ====
In 2001, Djokovic won his first title in a second-category tournament in Messina on the U14 circuit of the Tennis Europe Junior Tour, defeating compatriot Bojan Božović in the final, and his second in Livorno, where he beat top seed Andy Murray in the semifinals and second seed Aljoscha Thron in the final. In July, he won the U14 European Championship in Sanremo, defeating Lukáš Lacko in singles and the doubles with Božović against Russians Alexandre Krasnoroutskiy and Mikhail Bekker. He led Yugoslavia to victory in the European Summer Cup, finishing the year as European champion in singles, doubles, and team events. He also earned a silver medal at the ITF World Junior Championship U14 team competition for Yugoslavia. Djokovic ended 2001 ranked No. 1 on the ETA U14 list, with Andy Murray in second place.

In 2002, now competing in U16 events, Djokovic won two major tournaments in France: the Derby Cadets in La Baule, defeating Gaël Monfils in the final, and Le Pontet in Avignon. In September, he won his first ITF title in Pančevo, winning all matches in straight sets, including over No. 1 seed David Savić in the final. In November, Djokovic won the Prince Cup in Miami, defeating Stephen Bass in the final, shortly before competing at the Junior Orange Bowl, where he reached the third round before losing to Marcos Baghdatis.

Overall, Djokovic compiled a 40–11 singles and 23–6 doubles record in juniors, achieving a combined junior world ranking of No. 24 in February 2004. His best junior Grand Slam result was reaching the semifinals of the 2004 Australian Open. He also competed at the 2003 French Open and 2003 US Open.

==== 2003–2005: Start of professional career ====
Djokovic played his first professional match in January 2003 at a Futures event in Oberschleißheim after receiving a wildcard from Niki Pilić, narrowly losing to Alex Rădulescu. He won his first Futures title in Belgrade later that year and ended 2003 ranked No. 687. In 2004, he recorded his first ATP win during a Davis Cup match against Janis Skroderis, and later claimed his first Challenger title in Budapest on his 17th birthday, beating Daniele Bracciali in the final. He debuted on the ATP Tour main draw at the Croatia Open Umag and secured his first victory at a tournament in Bucharest, ending the year ranked No. 186.

Djokovic's Grand Slam debut came at the 2005 Australian Open, followed by his first Slam win at the French Open. That year, he also reached the third round at both Wimbledon and the US Open, where he beat Gaël Monfils and Mario Ančić. He impressed at the Paris Masters by reaching the third round after defeating Mariano Puerta, ending the year ranked world No. 78 as the youngest player in the top 100.

==== 2006: First ATP titles and major quarterfinal ====
In April 2006, Djokovic won both of his singles matches at a Davis Cup match against Great Britain, leading Serbia and Montenegro to victory. Following this, his family reportedly had discussions with the Lawn Tennis Association about representing Great Britain. Djokovic, then world No. 63, initially dismissed the story, calling it a kind gesture following the tie. In 2009, he confirmed the talks were serious but chose to represent Serbia, stating he was "proud of being a Serbian" and that he "didn't want to spoil that just because another country had better conditions".

At the French Open, Djokovic, then world No. 63, defeated ninth seed Fernando González en route to his first Grand Slam quarterfinal, where, due to issues with his back, he retired against Rafael Nadal after two sets in their first career meeting, launching their historic rivalry. At Wimbledon, he reached the fourth round before losing to Mario Ančić in five sets. Djokovic claimed his first ATP title at the Dutch Open in Amersfoort, defeating Nicolás Massú in the final without dropping a set. He won his second title at the Moselle Open in Metz, beating Jürgen Melzer, and broke into the top 20. He also made his first Masters quarterfinal at Madrid. He ended the season ranked No. 16, the youngest in the top 20.

==== 2007: First ATP 1000 title and major final, top 3 ====
Djokovic began 2007 by winning the Adelaide title, then reached the fourth round of the 2007 Australian Open, losing in straight sets to Roger Federer, who would go on to win the tournament. This, along with a strong showing at Indian Wells, where he finished runner-up, propelled him into the top 10. In Miami, he defeated Rafael Nadal in the quarterfinals, Andy Murray in the semifinals, and Guillermo Cañas in the final, earning his first Masters title and becoming the youngest male champion in the history of the tournament. He contributed a singles win in Serbia's Davis Cup win against Georgia. On clay, he defeated Richard Gasquet in the final of the Estoril Open, and reached the quarterfinals in Rome and Hamburg, losing to Nadal and Carlos Moyá, respectively. At the French Open, he made his first major semifinal, falling to Nadal. At Wimbledon, Djokovic won a five-hour quarterfinal over Marcos Baghdatis before retiring in the semifinals against Nadal due to elbow issues.

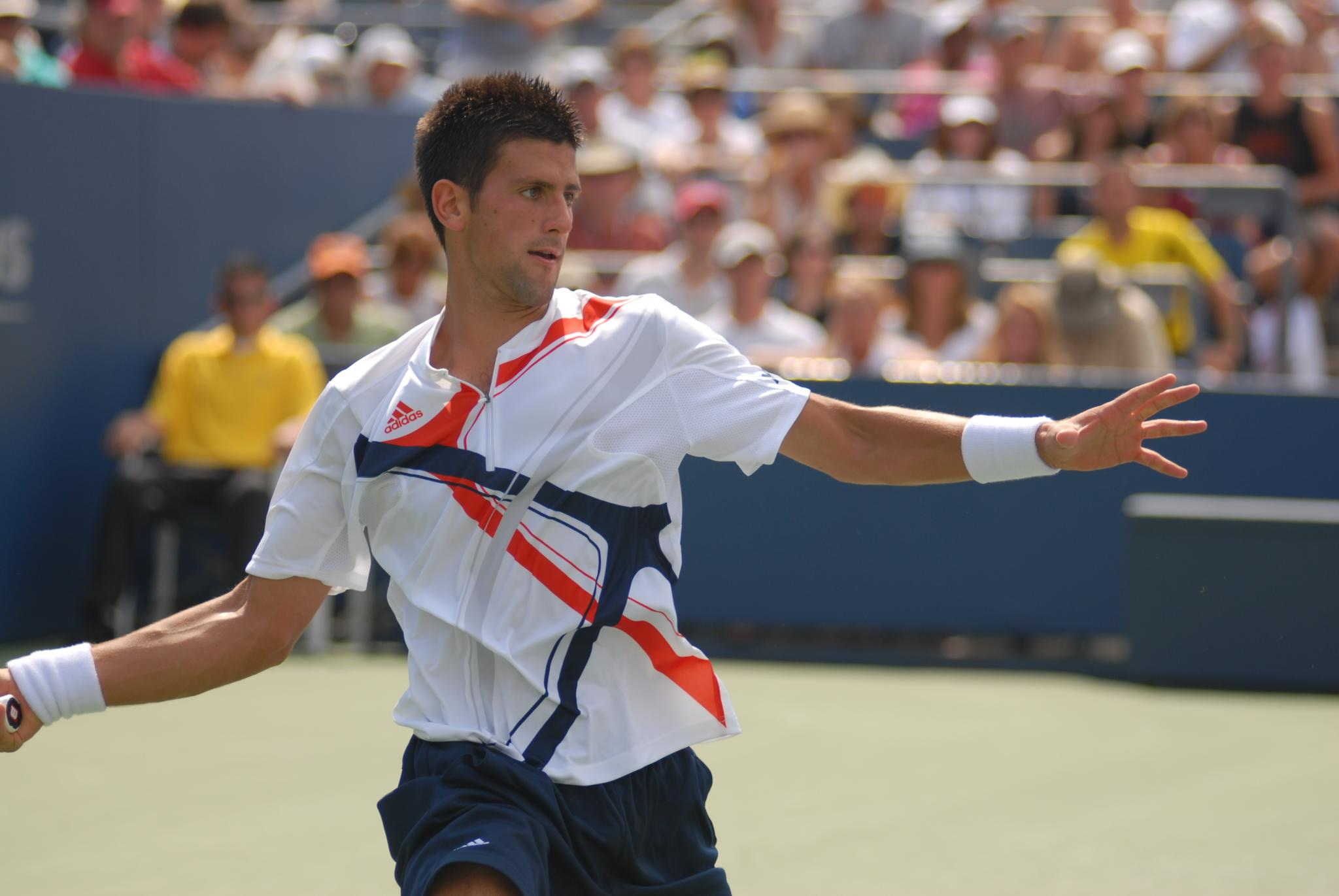
Djokovic during his first-round match at the 2007 US Open

Djokovic's breakthrough continued at the Canadian Open, where he defeated world No. 3 Andy Roddick, No. 2 Nadal and No. 1 Federer to claim the title, becoming the first player since Boris Becker in 1994 to beat the top three-ranked players in a single event. Following this, Björn Borg remarked that Djokovic was "definitely a contender to win a Grand Slam." Djokovic would then go on to reach his first major final at the US Open, where he had five set points in the first set and two in the second set, but lost them all before losing the match in straight sets to the top-seeded Federer. He won his fifth title of the year at the Vienna Open, defeating Stanislas Wawrinka in the final, and finishing the year ranked No. 3.

==== 2008: First Major title, Olympic Bronze and ATP Finals title ====
Djokovic began the year at the Hopman Cup alongside fellow Serbian Jelena Janković, where they reached the finals, but ultimately lost to the United States in the decisive mixed doubles rubber. The event also marked his first competitive match against Serena Williams. At the Australian Open, Djokovic reached the final without dropping a set, defeating Roger Federer in the semifinals, which made him the youngest Open Era player to make the last four at all four majors. He beat unseeded Jo-Wilfried Tsonga in four sets in the final, claiming his first Grand Slam singles title. It was the first Grand Slam title in 3 years not won by Roger Federer or Rafael Nadal.

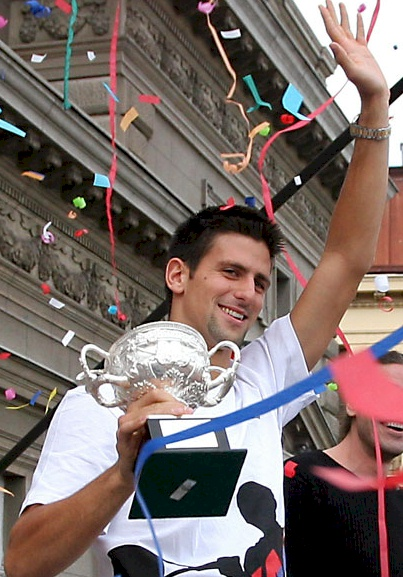
Djokovic celebrating his first Australian Open title in Belgrade

Djokovic then reached the semifinals in Dubai and won titles at Indian Wells and the Italian Open, his ninth and tenth titles, respectively. He lost to Nadal in the semifinals of both Hamburg and the 2008 French Open. On grass, he fell to Nadal in the Queen's Club final, and suffered a second-round loss at Wimbledon to Marat Safin, ending a streak of five straight major semifinals. After reaching the quarterfinals at the Rogers Cup, he qualified for the finals in Cincinnati, ending Nadal's 32-match win streak in the semis, ultimately, however, losing to Andy Murray in the finals. At the 2008 Summer Olympics, he earned a bronze medal in the singles event and exited in the first round in doubles with partner Nenad Zimonjić. Djokovic rounded off the season by winning his first year-end championship title at the Tennis Masters Cup in Shanghai in November, beating Nikolay Davydenko in the final.

==== 2009: Ten finals, five titles ====
Djokovic began the year at the Brisbane International, where he was upset in the first round by fellow Pilić academy trainee Ernests Gulbis. At the Australian Open, he retired in the quarterfinals against Andy Roddick due to heat-related illness. After a semifinal loss to Jo-Wilfried Tsonga in Marseille, Djokovic won the Dubai Championships, defeating David Ferrer for his 12th career title. At the Indian Wells Masters, he lost to Roddick in the quarterfinals. He then reached the final of the Miami Open, defeating Roger Federer in the semifinals before losing to Andy Murray. During the clay season, Djokovic reached the finals at both the Monte Carlo Masters and Italian Open, losing to Rafael Nadal each time. He then claimed his second title of the year at the inaugural Serbia Open, defeating Łukasz Kubot in the final. At the Madrid Open in May, he lost another close semifinal to Nadal in a record-setting match lasting 4 hours and 3 minutes. He exited the French Open in the third round to Philipp Kohlschreiber. Djokovic reached the final of the Gerry Weber Open on grass but lost to Tommy Haas, and then suffered another defeat to Haas in the quarterfinals of Wimbledon. During the 2009 US Open Series, he reached the quarterfinals in Montreal, then made the final in Cincinnati, defeating Nadal in the semifinals before falling to Federer. At the US Open, he reached the semifinals, where he was again defeated by Federer. He capped off the season by winning his only Masters title of the year at the Paris Masters after defeating Nadal in the semifinals, and outlasting Gaël Monfils in a decisive set tiebreak in the final.

=== 2010s ===
==== 2010: US Open final & Davis Cup crown ====
After playing nearly 100 matches in 2009, Djokovic opted to skip early ATP tournaments in 2010 and began the season at the exhibition Kooyong Classic, defeating Tommy Haas but losing to Fernando Verdasco and Bernard Tomic. At the Australian Open, he fell to Jo-Wilfried Tsonga in the quarterfinals despite being a set away from victory. He then reached the semifinals in Rotterdam and won the Dubai Championships, defending an ATP title for the first time. In March, he led Serbia to a 3–2 win over the United States in the 2010 Davis Cup, defeating Sam Querrey and John Isner. After early losses in Indian Wells and Miami, he split with coach Todd Martin. He reached the semifinals of the Monte Carlo Masters and the quarterfinals in Rome, both times losing to Verdasco. At the 2010 Serbia Open, he withdrew while trailing Filip Krajinović, marking his only loss to a player ranked outside the Top 200. At the French Open, he lost to Jürgen Melzer in the quarterfinals after leading by two sets — the only time in his career he lost a major match from that position. He captured his first ATP doubles title at the Aegon Championships with Jonathan Erlich. At Wimbledon, he lost in the semifinals to Tomáš Berdych. At the Canadian Open, Djokovic reached the semifinals, losing to Federer. He also teamed with Nadal in doubles, marking the first pairing of world No. 1 and No. 2 players since Jimmy Connors and Arthur Ashe in 1976. At the US Open, Djokovic saved two match points at 4–5 in the fifth set before beating Federer in the semi-finals, but lost to Nadal in the final in four sets.

==== 2011: One of the greatest seasons in history ====
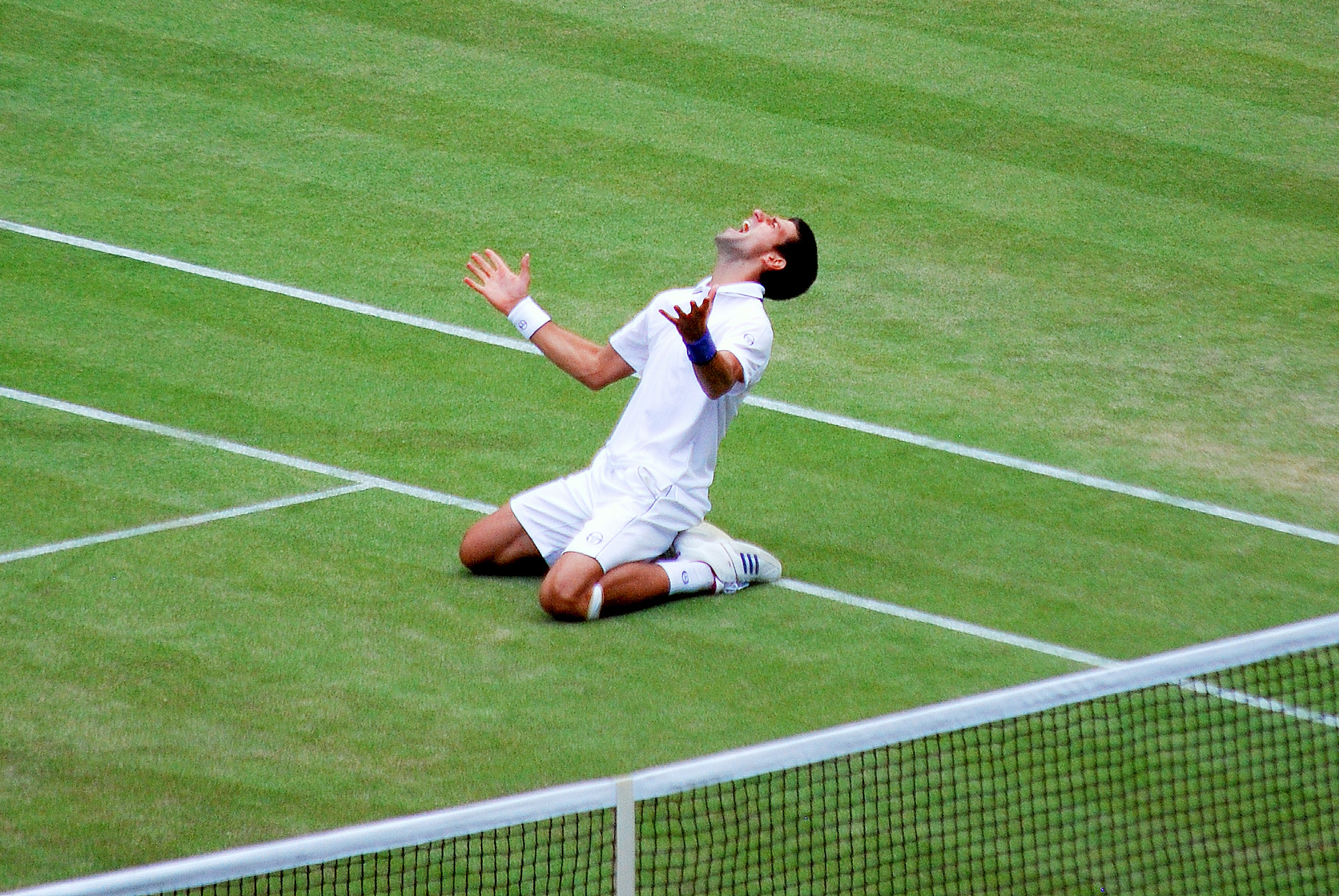
Djokovic celebrates upon defeating Jo-Wilfried Tsonga in the semifinals of the 2011 Wimbledon Championships, clinching the world No. 1 ranking for the first time in his career.

Djokovic opened the season by winning the Australian Open, defeating Roger Federer in the semifinals and Andy Murray in the final, both in straight sets, to claim his second title in Melbourne. He continued his run by beating Federer in the final of the Dubai Championships, and at Indian Wells he defeated both Federer and Rafael Nadal, becoming only the third player to beat both in the same event twice. In Miami, Djokovic defeated Nadal again to claim back-to-back Masters 1000 titles. After winning the Serbia Open, he extended his unbeaten streak with titles in Madrid and the Italian Open, defeating Nadal in straight sets in both finals—his first wins over Nadal on clay after nine straight losses. At the French Open, Djokovic reached the semifinals before falling to Federer in four sets—his first loss of the year, ending a 43-match win streak. Five weeks later, Djokovic claimed his first Wimbledon title, defeating Nadal in the final, and secured the world No. 1 ranking for the first time in his career. Federer served for the match and had two match points in the US Open semi-finals, but Djokovic won in five sets. He then beat Nadal in four sets in the final for his first US Open title and third major in 2011.

==== 2012: Australian Open and year-end titles ====
Djokovic began the season by winning the Australian Open, defeating David Ferrer in the quarterfinals and Andy Murray in a five-set semifinal lasting 4 hours and 50 minutes. He faced off against Rafael Nadal in their third consecutive major final meeting after last year's Wimbledon and US Open. Djokovic won in 5 hours and 53 minutes, which was the longest major final and longest match in Australian Open history. Djokovic then lost to John Isner in the semifinals of Indian Wells but retained his Miami title by defeating Murray. Djokovic fell to Nadal in the finals of both Monte Carlo and the Italian Open. At the French Open, he reached his first final at the tournament, defeating Roger Federer in the semis. Attempting to hold all four majors at once, he lost to Nadal in four sets. At Wimbledon, he was again beaten by eventual champion Federer in the semifinals, ceding his No. 1 ranking to Federer.

Djokovic was Serbia's flag bearer at the 2012 Summer Olympics in London. He beat Jo-Wilfried Tsonga to reach the semifinals but lost to Murray and then to Juan Martín del Potro in the bronze medal match, finishing fourth. He defended his Rogers Cup title, dropping just one set, but lost the Cincinnati Open final to Federer. At the US Open, Djokovic lost in the final in five sets to Murray.

Djokovic then won titles at the China Open and Shanghai Rolex Masters, notably saving five championship points against Murray in the latter. Despite losing his opening round at the Paris Masters, he reclaimed the No. 1 spot after Federer withdrew from the tournament. He capped off the season by winning his 2nd ATP Finals title, beating Federer in the final.

==== 2013: Australian Open and year-end titles ====
Djokovic began his 2013 season at the 2013 Hopman Cup, representing Serbia with Ana Ivanovic. He won three of his four singles matches, including a final-round win over Fernando Verdasco, but Serbia lost the final 1–2 to Spain. At the Australian Open, he defeated Stan Wawrinka in a memorable fourth-round match lasting over five hours, and went on to beat Andy Murray in the final to win a record third consecutive Australian Open title in the Open Era. Djokovic next helped Serbia take a 2–0 lead over Belgium in the 2013 Davis Cup World Group first round, with a straight-sets win over Olivier Rochus. He then won the 2013 Dubai Tennis Championships, defeating Tomáš Berdych in the final. At Indian Wells, Djokovic's 22-match winning streak was ended by Juan Martín del Potro in the semifinals. At the Miami Masters, he was upset in the fourth round by Tommy Haas. In Davis Cup quarterfinals, Djokovic helped Serbia defeat the United States with wins over John Isner and Sam Querrey. He then won the 2013 Monte-Carlo Rolex Masters, defeating Rafael Nadal in straight sets to end Nadal's 46-match winning streak at the event. He suffered early exits at the Madrid Open and Rome Masters, losing to Grigor Dimitrov and Berdych, respectively. At the 2013 French Open, Djokovic advanced to the semifinals, defeating Wawrinka, Dimitrov, Philipp Kohlschreiber, and Tommy Haas, before losing a dramatic five-set match to Nadal. At Wimbledon, Djokovic defeated Del Potro in a historic semifinal lasting 4 hours and 44 minutes, but lost the final to Murray in straight sets. Djokovic was a finalist at the US Open, where he lost to Nadal in four sets. He later won the China Open and the Shanghai Masters, extending his unbeaten streak in Asia to 20 matches. He then claimed the Paris Masters, defeating David Ferrer in the final. Djokovic ended the year by winning the 2013 ATP World Tour Finals, beating Nadal in the final. He concluded the season with a 24-match winning streak and later announced that Boris Becker would join his team as head coach for 2014.

==== 2014: Wimbledon and ATP Finals titles, four ATP 1000 wins ====
Djokovic began the year by winning the Mubadala World Tennis Championship. At the Australian Open, he reached the quarterfinals with four straight-set wins before losing to Stanislas Wawrinka in five sets, ending his 25-match win streak in Melbourne and 14 consecutive Grand Slam semifinals. He won the Indian Wells Masters, defeating Roger Federer, and the Miami Masters by beating Rafael Nadal. A wrist injury affected his Monte Carlo campaign, where he lost to Federer in the semifinals. After recovering, he won the 2014 Italian Open by defeating Nadal, while he eventually donated his $500,000 prize to victims of the 2014 Southeast Europe floods. At the French Open, Djokovic dropped only two sets en route to the final but lost to Nadal in four sets, his first loss to him after four wins. Djokovic won his second Wimbledon title by defeating Federer in five sets in the final, reclaiming the world No. 1 ranking. He suffered early exits at the Canadian Open (to Jo-Wilfried Tsonga) and Cincinnati (to Tommy Robredo). At the US Open, he reached the semifinals but lost to Kei Nishikori. He won a fifth China Open title in six years, and after a semifinal loss to Federer in Shanghai, claimed the Paris Masters without dropping a set. At the ATP Finals, he set a record by dropping just nine games in the round-robin stage. By reaching the semifinals, Djokovic secured the year-end No. 1 ranking for the third time, tying Nadal for the fifth most. He won the title after Roger Federer withdrew from the final as a result of a back injury, which marked the first walkover in a final in the 45-year history of the tournament.

==== 2015: Career-best season: three majors, six Masters, and ATP Finals title ====
Djokovic began the season at the Qatar Open in Doha, but lost in the quarterfinals against Ivo Karlović in three tight sets. He then played at the Australian Open, where he made it through the first five rounds without dropping a set. In the semifinals, he faced defending champion Stan Wawrinka, this time prevailing in 5 sets, and then beat Andy Murray in the final to win his 5th Australian Open title and 8th major overall.

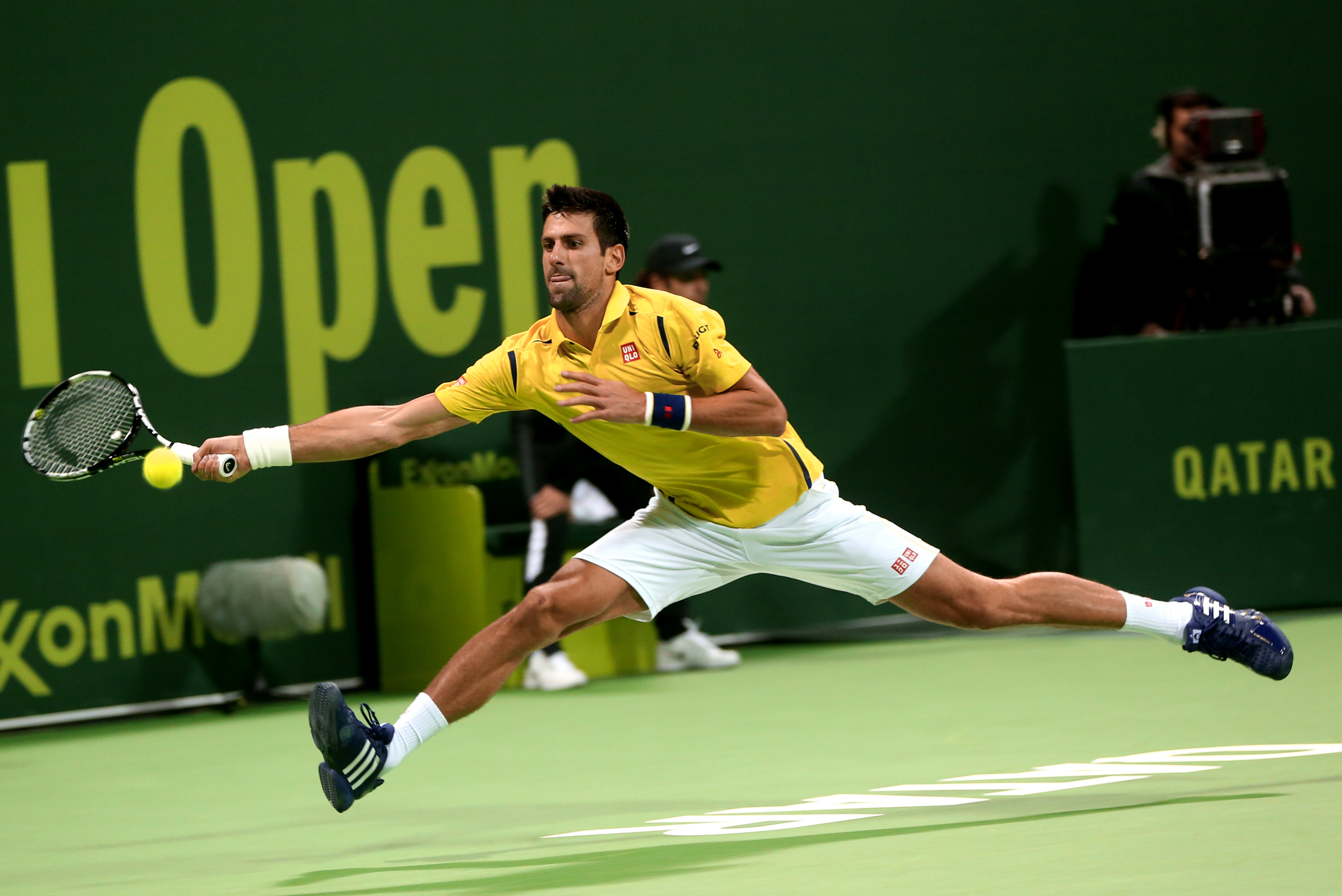
Djokovic sliding on a hard court to get a ball back

He next competed at the Dubai Championships and lost to Federer in the final. After 2 weeks, Djokovic defeated John Isner and Andy Murray en route to the Indian Wells Masters title, beating Federer in three sets. In Miami, he defeated David Ferrer and John Isner en route to winning his fifth title, defeating Andy Murray in three sets. Djokovic thus became the first player to complete the Sunshine double three times. In April, Djokovic clinched his second Monte-Carlo Masters by beating Tomáš Berdych in the final, and thus became the first man to win the first three ATP Masters 1000 titles of the season. Djokovic withdrew from the 2015 Madrid Masters, but won the Italian Open, making it 4 out of 4 titles in Masters events entered by Djokovic in the season. This final was notable for being the only clay court final ever contested between Djokovic and Federer.

He continued his good form on clay at the French Open by reaching the final without dropping a set in the first five rounds, including a quarterfinal clash with Nadal and a five-set semifinal victory over Andy Murray which took two days to complete. However, he lost championship match to Stan Wawrinka in four sets. Five weeks later, he beat Kevin Anderson in the fourth round in five sets, and then went on to claim his third Wimbledon title with a win over Roger Federer.

Djokovic had the chance to become the first man in history to complete Career Golden Masters in Cincinnati, but he lost the final to Federer (Djokovic would accomplish the feat three years later). At the US Open, Djokovic reached the final for the sixth time in his career, achieving the feat of reaching all four Grand Slam finals in a single calendar year. In the final, he faced Federer once again, defeating him in four sets to win his third Grand Slam title of the year and his tenth major overall.

He returned to Beijing in October, winning the title for the sixth time, defeating Nadal in straight sets in the final to bring his overall record at the tournament to 29–0. Djokovic then reached the final of the Paris Masters, where he defeated Murray in straight sets, taking his fourth title there and a record sixth ATP Masters tournament in one year. After losing to Federer in the round-robin stage of the ATP Finals, in a rematch final, he beat Federer in straight sets to win his fifth ATP Finals title and becoming the first player to win the Finals four consecutive times.

By the end of the season, Djokovic made a season-record 15 consecutive finals, reaching the championship match of every top-level tournament he played (four in majors, eight in Masters, and the final at the ATP Finals). He won 11 titles including a season-record 10 Big Titles. Djokovic set a season-record of 16,585 for most ranking points accumulated as world No. 1. and had a season-record 31 victories over top-10 players, including a 15–4 winning record against the other members of the Big Four. The 2015 season is Djokovic's most successful season as of 2022, and it is considered one of the greatest seasons in tennis history.

==== 2016: 'Nole Slam', four Masters titles, and ranking points record ====
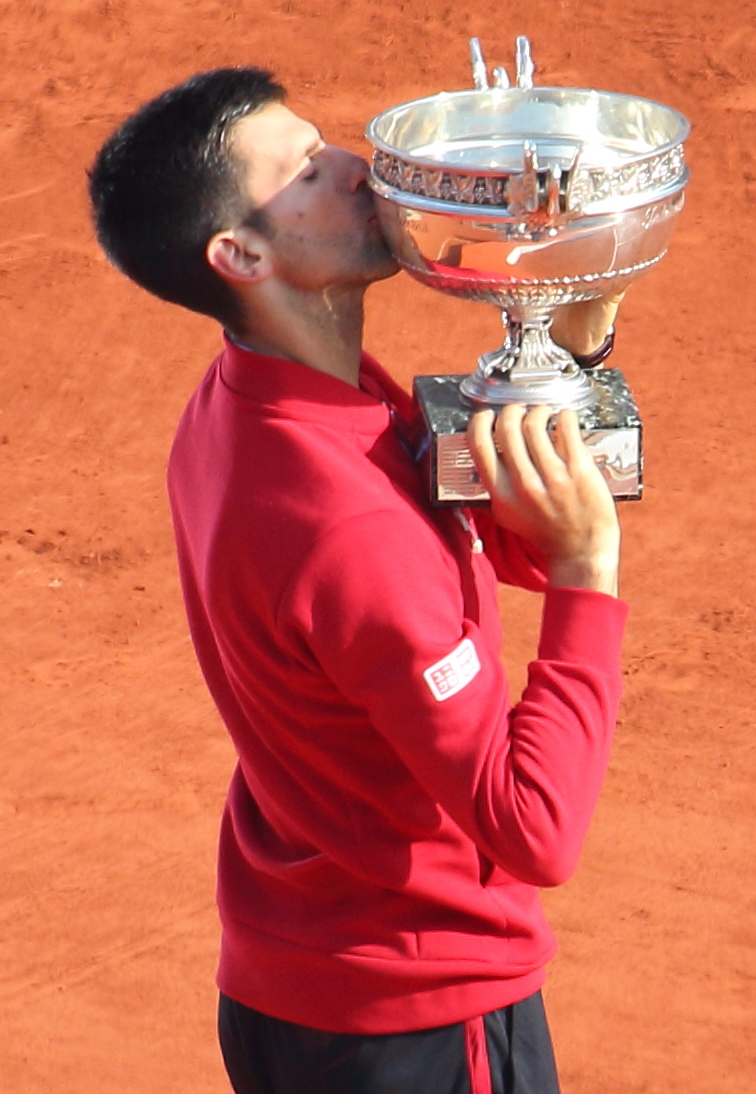
Djokovic kissing Coupe des Mousquetaires after winning the 2016 French Open, completing "Nole Slam" and a Career Grand Slam

Djokovic won his 60th career title in Doha, defeating Rafael Nadal in 73 minutes. He broke his ATP ranking points record, reaching 16,790. Djokovic then claimed his sixth Australian Open, beating Roger Federer in the semifinals and Andy Murray in the final. After recovering from an eye infection at the Dubai Championships, he won his fifth Indian Wells Masters title, beating Nadal and Milos Raonic. Djokovic's dominance meant world Nos. 2 and 3 combined points still wouldn't surpass him. On 3 April 2016, Djokovic won the Miami Open without dropping a set, claiming his sixth title and tying Andre Agassi's record. This was his fourth Sunshine Double, the most in history, and third consecutive. The win made him the all-time ATP prize money leader with $98.2 million. After an early exit at the Monte-Carlo Masters, Djokovic won the Madrid Open, beating Murray in the final. The next week at the Rome Masters, Murray defeated Djokovic; Djokovic still beat Nadal and Kei Nishikori in earlier rounds. Djokovic won the French Open, defeating Murray in four sets, completing the historic Nole Slam. This made Djokovic the eighth player to achieve a Career Grand Slam, third after Don Budge and Rod Laver to hold all four major titles simultaneously, and the first to earn $100 million in prize money. His ranking points rose to a record 16,950. At Wimbledon, Djokovic's 30-match Grand Slam winning streak ended with a third-round loss to Sam Querrey, his earliest Slam exit since the 2009 French Open. In late July, Djokovic returned to form, winning his fourth Canadian Open title, his 30th Masters overall. At the US Open, he lost the final to Wawrinka in four sets.

==== 2017: Split with the team and injury hiatus ====
In January, Djokovic defended his title in Doha, defeating world No. 1 Andy Murray. At the Australian Open, he lost in the second round to No. 117 Denis Istomin, marking his first early exit since 2008 and his first loss at a major to a player outside the top 100. In February and March, he was eliminated before the semifinals by Nick Kyrgios at the Mexican Open and Indian Wells Masters. In April, Djokovic reached the quarterfinals of the Monte-Carlo Masters, losing to David Goffin. He then split with longtime coach Marián Vajda, fitness coach Gebhard Phil-Gritsch, and physiotherapist Miljan Amanović to find a new spark. He reached the semifinals at the Madrid Masters, losing to Rafael Nadal, and was runner-up at the Rome Masters, losing to Alexander Zverev. On 21 May, Djokovic announced Andre Agassi as his new coach, starting at the French Open, where he lost in the quarterfinals to Dominic Thiem. He began the grass season at the Eastbourne International, winning the title by beating Gaël Monfils—his only tournament win without Vajda until their 2022 split. At Wimbledon, he retired in the quarterfinals against Tomáš Berdych due to an elbow injury. On 26 July, Djokovic announced he would miss the US Open and the rest of the season to recover from his injury. This ended his streak of 51 consecutive Grand Slam appearances since his debut in 2005.

Djokovic ended the year No. 12, his lowest ranking since 2006.

==== 2018: Surgery, two majors, Career Golden Masters ====
In January, Djokovic won the Kooyong Classic exhibition against Dominic Thiem. At the 2018 Australian Open, he reached the fourth round before losing to Chung Hyeon. In late January, he underwent elbow surgery. He returned to practice by early March, and played at Indian Wells a week later, losing in the second round to Taro Daniel. He also lost early at the Miami Open to Benoît Paire. Reuniting with coach Marián Vajda at the Monte-Carlo Masters, Djokovic defeated Dušan Lajović and Borna Ćorić before losing to Dominic Thiem. He said, "After two years, finally I can play without pain." Following an early loss at Barcelona to Martin Kližan, he showed improvement at the Madrid Open by beating Kei Nishikori—his first top 20 win in 10 months—but lost to Kyle Edmund in the second round. He then participated at the Italian Open but lost to eventual champion Rafael Nadal in the semifinal. After failing to defend his finalist points from 2017, Djokovic's ranking fell to No. 22, his first time being out of the top 20 since October 2006. He then lost to unseeded Marco Cecchinato in the quarterfinals of the French Open.

In the second-longest Wimbledon semifinal to date, Djokovic beat Nadal in five sets played over two days. Djokovic then defeated Kevin Anderson in the final in straight sets to win his fourth Wimbledon title and 13th overall major title, and returned to the top 10 in the rankings. Djokovic then beat top seed Roger Federer in straight sets in the final of the Cincinnati Open and thus became the first singles player to complete the Career Golden Masters. At the US Open, Djokovic defeated Juan Martín del Potro in straight sets, winning his third US Open and 14th major title overall.

Djokovic then participated at the 2018 Shanghai Rolex Masters and won his 4th title at the tournament and 2nd Masters title of the year, beating Borna Ćorić in the final. He did not drop a set nor have his serve broken during the tournament, and his ranking rose to No. 2. Following Nadal's withdrawal from the Paris Masters, Djokovic regained the No. 1 ranking, but lost to unseeded Karen Khachanov in the final. At the ATP Finals, he reached the final stage, winning all three of his round-robin matches and securing the year-end No. 1 for a fifth time, but was upset by Zverev.

==== 2019: Wimbledon and 7th Australian Open titles ====
Djokovic began 2019 at the Qatar Open, losing in the semifinals to Roberto Bautista Agut. As the top seed at the Australian Open, he defeated Rafael Nadal in the final to claim his record seventh Australian Open and 15th major title. He was then upset by Philipp Kohlschreiber at the Indian Wells Masters third round, and lost in the fourth round of the Miami Open to Bautista Agut. On clay, Djokovic reached the quarterfinals of the Monte-Carlo Masters, losing to Daniil Medvedev. During the Madrid Open, he celebrated his 250th week at world number 1 in the ATP rankings and won the title by defeating Stefanos Tsitsipas. At the Italian Open, he reached the final after beating Juan Martín del Potro, but lost to Nadal. At the French Open, Djokovic reached the semifinals without dropping a set, becoming the first man to reach 10 consecutive French Open quarterfinals. He lost a marathon five-set match to Dominic Thiem, ending a 26-match winning streak in majors and his bid for a second 'Nole Slam'. Djokovic defended his title at Wimbledon, beating Roger Federer in a record 4-hour 57-minute five-set final. Despite winning fewer points, Djokovic saved two championship points to claim his fifth Wimbledon and 16th major title. He lost in the semifinals of the Cincinnati Open to eventual champion Medvedev, and retired injured in the fourth round of the US Open against Stan Wawrinka. In October, Djokovic won the Japan Open over John Millman but lost in the quarterfinals of the Shanghai Masters to Tsitsipas. He ended the season and decade by winning his fifth Paris Masters title against Denis Shapovalov, regarded as the most successful player in men's tennis during the decade.

=== 2020s ===
==== 2020: Australian Open title, 2nd Career Golden Masters ====
At the inaugural 2020 ATP Cup, Djokovic led Serbia to victory with six wins, including over Daniil Medvedev in the semifinals and Rafael Nadal in the final. At the Australian Open, he beat Roger Federer in the semifinals and defeated Dominic Thiem in five sets in the final, earning his eighth Australian Open and 17th Grand Slam title. He regained the world No. 1 ranking and became the first player in the Open Era to win Grand Slams in three different decades. It was also his first comeback win from two sets to one down in a major final. Djokovic then claimed his fifth title at the Dubai Championships, defeating Stefanos Tsitsipas in the final. In June, during the Adria Tour he organized, Djokovic tested positive for COVID-19, along with several other participants, prompting criticism over the event's lack of safety protocols. Djokovic later apologized, saying they believed the tournament met all health guidelines, but acknowledged they "were wrong". He later described the criticism as part of a "witch hunt". Djokovic was disqualified from the US Open during his fourth-round match after taking a ball and hitting it towards the advertising hoarding, unintentionally striking a lineswoman in the process. Djokovic lost in straight sets in the French Open final to Nadal.

==== 2021: Major titles on all three surfaces ====
Djokovic began the year at the 2021 ATP Cup, winning both singles matches, but Serbia exited in the group stage. He then won his ninth Australian Open title and 18th major overall, defeating Daniil Medvedev in the final. On 1 March, Djokovic tied and then surpassed Roger Federer's Open Era record of 310 weeks as world No. 1. He suffered early losses at the Monte-Carlo Masters (to Dan Evans) and Serbia Open (to Aslan Karatsev), and reached the final of the Italian Open, defeating Stefanos Tsitsipas and Lorenzo Sonego, before losing to Rafael Nadal.

At the French Open, he beat Nadal in a four-set semifinal and came from two sets down to defeat Tsitsipas in the final. He became the first man in the Open Era to win a major after coming from two sets down twice in the same event, and the first to win all four majors at least twice in the Open Era. At Wimbledon, he earned his 100th grass-court win en route to the final, where he defeated Matteo Berrettini to win his sixth title and 20th major, tying Federer and Nadal. He became the second man to win majors on all three surfaces in a single year (a "Surface Slam"), and the fifth in the Open Era to achieve the Channel Slam (French Open and Wimbledon in the same year). At the 2020 Summer Olympics, Djokovic sought a gold medal, but lost to Alexander Zverev in the semifinals and to Pablo Carreño Busta in the bronze match.

In mixed doubles, partnering Nina Stojanović, they reached the semifinals but withdrew from the bronze medal match due to Djokovic's shoulder injury. Djokovic entered the US Open in contention for the Grand Slam, a feat in men's singles tennis achieved only by Don Budge in 1938 and Rod Laver in 1962 and 1969. Djokovic defeated Zverev in five sets in the semifinals. In the final, he "looked subdued throughout as he made a high number of uncharacteristic errors" and lost to Medvedev in straight sets.

==== 2022: Australian Open controversy ====
Djokovic was set to start his 2022 season at the ATP Cup in Sydney but withdrew. To compete in the Australian Open, players were required to be vaccinated against COVID-19 or have a medical exemption. Djokovic received an exemption from Tennis Australia and the Department of Health (Victoria), citing a positive COVID-19 test on 16 December 2021. He was granted a visa on 18 November 2021 and arrived in Melbourne on 5 January, but was detained by the Australian Border Force for failing to meet entry requirements for unvaccinated travellers. Djokovic later admitted an error in his travel declaration form, as he had been in Spain shortly before arriving. His visa was cancelled, and he was held in a detention hotel pending appeal. On 10 January, the Federal Circuit and Family Court of Australia ruled in Djokovic's favour, ordering his release and noting that he was denied sufficient time to consult with lawyers and tennis officials before his interview. However, on 14 January, Alex Hawke, Australia's Minister for Immigration, Citizenship, Migrant Services and Multicultural Affairs, cancelled Djokovic's visa again under the Migration Act 1958, citing concerns about public health and order. The Federal Court of Australia upheld the decision, and Djokovic was deported on 16 January.

==== 2022: After Australia ====
In February, Djokovic returned to the Dubai Championships, where vaccination was not required. He lost in the quarterfinals to Jiří Veselý, resulting in the loss of his world No. 1 ranking to Daniil Medvedev. It was the first time since 2004 that a player outside the Big Four held the top spot. Djokovic withdrew from the Indian Wells Masters and Miami Open due to U.S. entry restrictions on unvaccinated foreigners. Despite not playing, he regained No. 1 when Medvedev lost early at Indian Wells. He began his clay season at the Monte-Carlo Masters, losing his opening match to Davidovich Fokina. At the Serbia Open, he reached the final but lost to Andrey Rublev. In May, he was beaten by Carlos Alcaraz in the Madrid Open semifinals. A week later, he won the Italian Open, his sixth title there and a record-extending 38th Masters crown, after defeating Stefanos Tsitsipas in the final. In the semis, he claimed his 1,000th career win by beating Casper Ruud. At the French Open, he advanced to the quarterfinals without dropping a set, but lost to Rafael Nadal in their record 59th match, ending his title defense and again dropping to No. 2. At Wimbledon, he earned his 80th win at each major with a first-round victory over Kwon Soon-woo, becoming the first player to do so. He reached a record 32nd Grand Slam final after defeating Cameron Norrie in the semifinals and beat Nick Kyrgios in four sets to claim his seventh Wimbledon and 21st major title, surpassing Roger Federer and moving one behind Nadal. Because of U.S. travel restrictions for unvaccinated foreigners, Djokovic was barred from entering the country and subsequently withdrew from the US Open.

Djokovic then reached the Rolex Paris Masters final as the defending champion, but lost to Holger Rune, which was the first time he lost a Masters final after winning the first set. At the ATP Finals, Djokovic won his record-equaling 6th title, going undefeated in the round-robin stage and beating Casper Ruud in the final. Djokovic ended the year as world No. 5.

==== 2023: Record-breaking 24th major & 7th ATP Finals titles ====
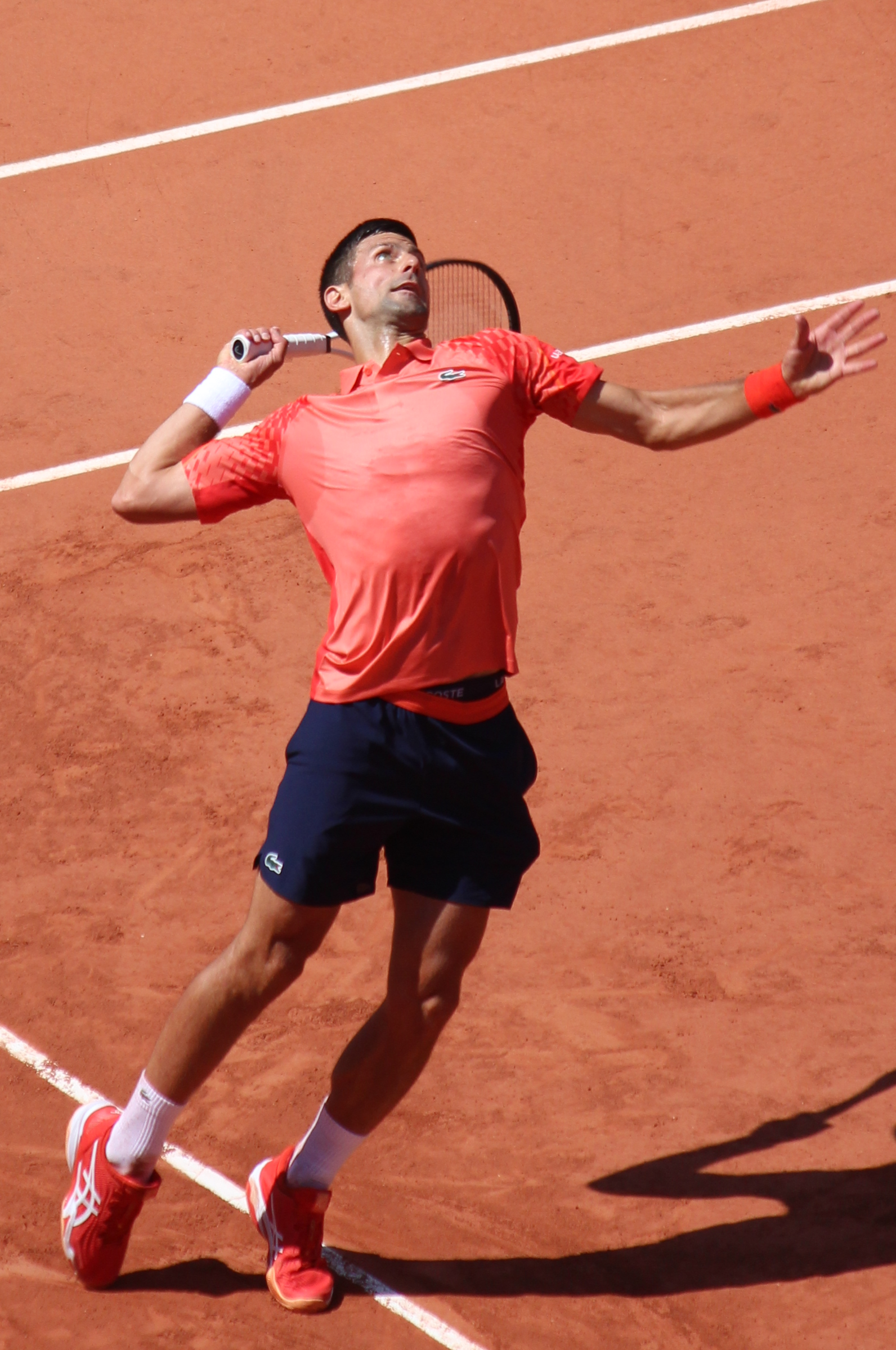
Djokovic at the 2023 French Open

Djokovic opened the year with his 92nd title at the Adelaide International, saving a championship point to beat Sebastian Korda. At the Australian Open, despite a hamstring issue, he defeated Stefanos Tsitsipas in the final to claim a record-extending 10th title and reclaim the No. 1 ranking. He missed the Indian Wells and 2023 Miami Open due to U.S. entry restrictions. During the clay season, he exited early at the Monte-Carlo Masters and Banja Luka Open, and lost in the Rome quarterfinals. At the French Open, Djokovic defeated world No. 1 Carlos Alcaraz in the semis and beat Casper Ruud in the final to win a record-breaking 23rd major, becoming the first man to achieve a triple Career Grand Slam. He also regained the top ranking.

At Wimbledon, Djokovic reached his 9th final but lost to Alcaraz in five sets, ending a 34-match winning streak at Wimbledon. Djokovic then won the Cincinnati Open, beating Alcaraz in 3 hours and 49 minutes in the longest best-of-three-set ATP final, hailed as one of the greatest matches ever. At the US Open, he triumphed over Medvedev in straight sets to win his fourth US Open title and a record-extending 24th men's singles major title overall. Djokovic became the oldest US Open men's singles champion in the Open Era.

Djokovic ended his season by winning the ATP Finals, clinching the year-end No.1 ranking for a record eighth time.

==== 2024: Olympic Gold, Career Super Slam, oldest ATP No. 1 ====
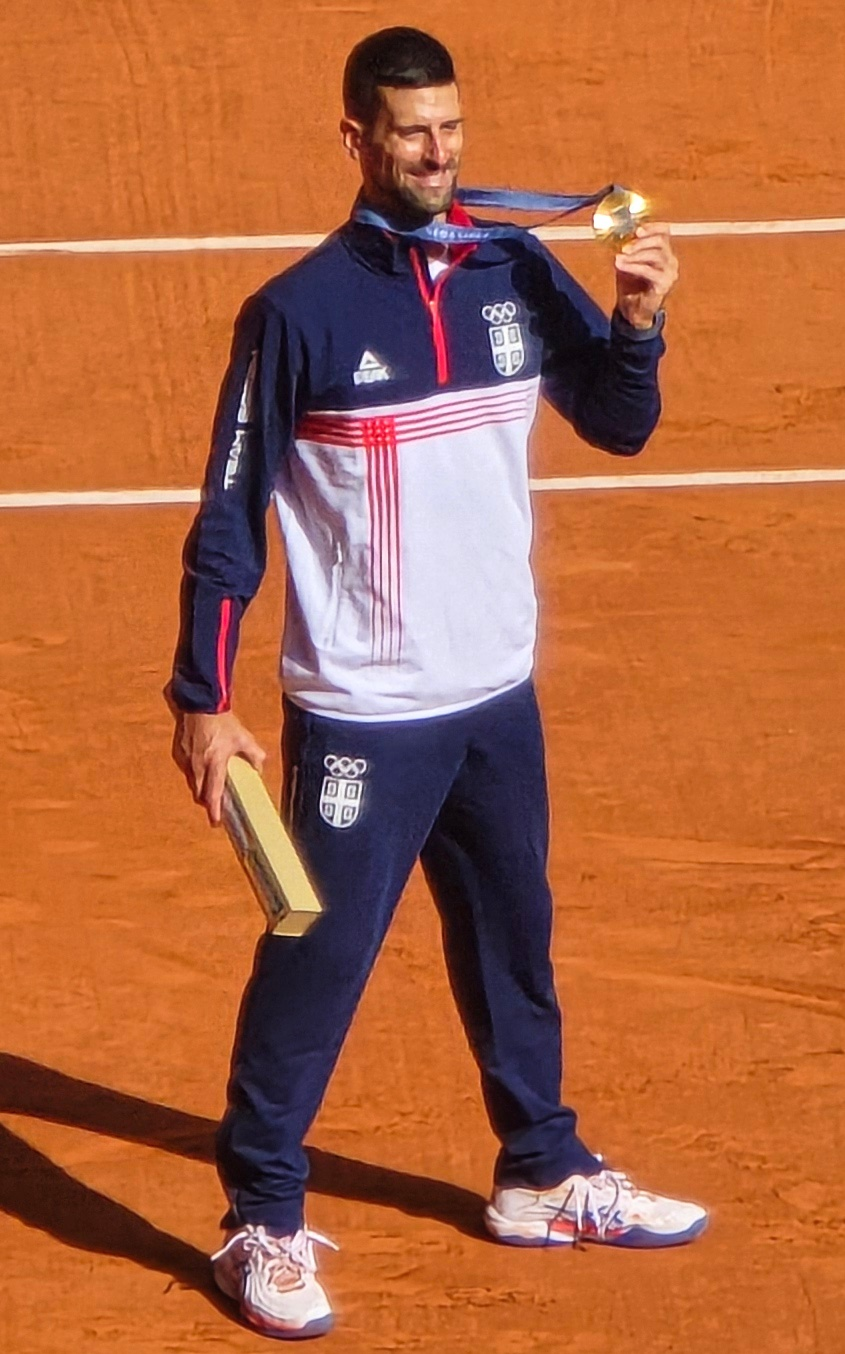
Djokovic posing with his gold medal following the men's singles final at the 2024 Summer Olympics

At the Australian Open, Djokovic reached the semifinals but lost to world No. 4 Jannik Sinner in four sets, ending his 33-match win streak at the event and marking his first semifinal defeat there. He called it "one of the worst Grand Slam matches I've ever played". Nonetheless, he equaled Roger Federer's record of 58 Grand Slam singles quarterfinals and retained his world No. 1 ranking. At Indian Wells Masters, he lost in the third round to Luca Nardi, ranked No. 123—the lowest-ranked player to defeat him at a Masters 1000 or Grand Slam. At the 2024 Monte-Carlo Masters, he reached the semifinals but lost to Casper Ruud. In Rome, after being accidentally struck by a water bottle post-match, he lost in the third round to Alejandro Tabilo. At the 2024 Geneva Open, he earned his 1,100th career win on his 37th birthday, becoming the third man in the Open Era to reach that mark, and holding the highest win percentage among them (83.5%). At the French Open, Djokovic survived a five-set match against Lorenzo Musetti that ended at 3:07 a.m.—the latest finish in tournament history. In the fourth round, he defeated Francisco Cerúndolo in his longest French Open match (4h39m), surpassing Federer's records for most Grand Slam match wins and quarterfinal appearances. However, he suffered a torn medial meniscus in his right knee during that match and withdrew before the quarterfinals, losing the No. 1 ranking to Sinner. At the 2024 Wimbledon Championships, Djokovic reached his 37th Grand Slam final, aiming to equal Federer's record of eight titles, but lost in straight sets to Carlos Alcaraz in a repeat of the 2023 final. At the 2024 Summer Olympics, Djokovic defeated Matthew Ebden, Rafael Nadal, Dominik Koepfer, Stefanos Tsitsipas, and Lorenzo Musetti to reach his first Olympic final. He then beat Carlos Alcaraz in straight sets to win the gold medal, completing a Career Golden Slam and Career Super Slam.

==== 2025: 100th ATP title and further records broken ====
Djokovic opened the 2025 season at the Brisbane International, losing to Reilly Opelka in the quarterfinals. His second-round match at the Australian Open marked his 430th career major main draw singles match, surpassing Roger Federer's all-time record. He beat Carlos Alcaraz in four sets in the quarterfinals. Djokovic retired in his semifinal match against Alexander Zverev due to a muscle tear after only one set was played.

At Doha, he lost to Matteo Berrettini in the first round. This marked the first time Djokovic lost in any first round since the 2016 Summer Olympics. Djokovic's next tournament was the Indian Wells Open, where he suffered a second-round defeat to lucky loser Botic van de Zandschulp – the 2nd year in a row where he lost to a lucky loser at the same tournament, following Luca Nardi.

At the 2025 Miami Open, Djokovic beat lucky loser Camilo Ugo Carabelli in the third round to claim his record 411th career main draw win at the Masters 1000 level, surpassing Nadal's previous record of 410. He lost in the final to Jakub Menšík.

In May 2025, it was announced that Andy Murray would no longer be working as Djokovic's coach, by mutual agreement reached after Djokovic began working with Murray in November 2024. After Murray's departure, Djokovic's assistant coach and analyst, Boris Bošnjaković, assumed full coaching responsibility for the remainder of the season. Djokovic took a last-minute entry to the 2025 Geneva Open, where he defeated Hubert Hurkacz in the final to claim the 100th ATP singles title of his career, becoming the first-ever tennis player to win at least one ATP singles title in twenty consecutive seasons, and the 3rd tennis player in the Open Era to have won 100 or more career titles (after Jimmy Connors and Federer). At the French Open, Djokovic reached a record-extending 51st major semifinal, where he lost in straight sets to world No. 1 Jannik Sinner. By winning the quarterfinals, he recorded his 101st win at the tournament, the second most after Rafael Nadal. At Wimbledon, Djokovic was again defeated by Sinner in the semifinal (his record-extending 52nd semifinal), with Djokovic noting that the "age, the wear and tear of the body" meant he was limited in his ability to beat players like Sinner or Alcaraz. It was the first time he failed to make the Wimbledon final since 2017. At the US Open, he lost in straight sets in the semi-finals to Alcaraz.

At the inaugural Hellenic Championship, Djokovic defeated Lorenzo Musetti in the final to claim his 101st career ATP Tour-level title and his 72nd title won on hard courts, surpassing an all-time record he jointly held with Roger Federer. Aged 38 years and 5 months old, Djokovic became the oldest men's singles champion on the ATP Tour since its establishment in 1990, and the third-oldest men's singles tour-level champion in the Open Era.

==== 2026: Oldest Australian Open finalist, Beijing title ====
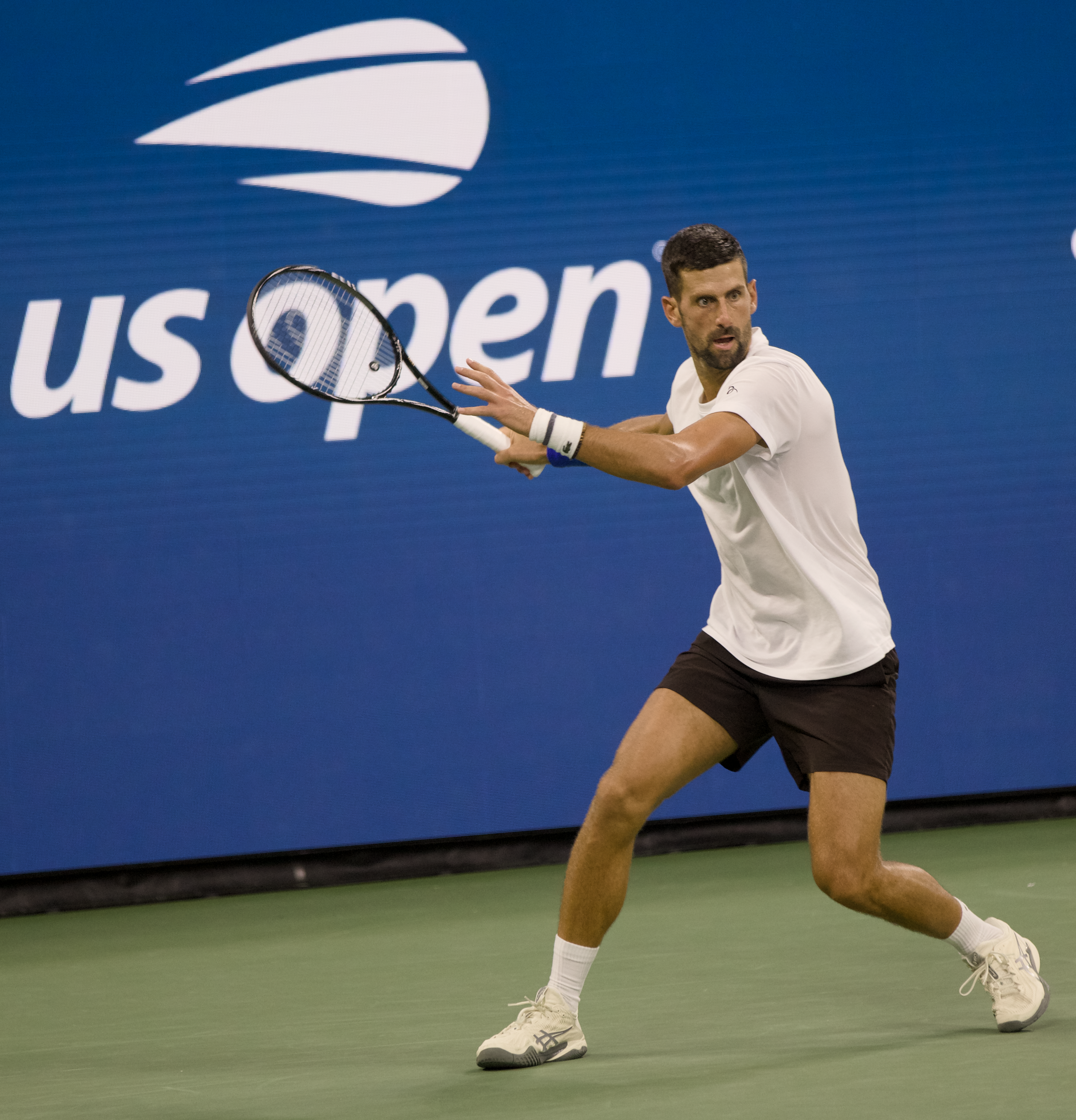
Novak Djokovic at the 2026 US Open.

Djokovic started his season with the 2026 Australian Open, not having played any warm-up tournament for the first time. In the semifinals of the Australian Open, Djokovic defeated two-time defending champion Jannik Sinner to advance to his 11th Australian Open final at Melbourne Park, becoming the oldest Australian Open finalist at the age of 38, and his ranking rose to No. 3. However, Djokovic's quest for a record-extending 25th major title ended in the final, where he was defeated by Carlos Alcaraz in four sets, who completed a Career Grand Slam. Djokovic then competed at the Indian Wells Masters, beating Kamil Majchrzak and Aleksandar Kovacevic in three sets to reach the fourth round for the first time since 2017, but lost to defending champion Jack Draper in three sets. At the 2026 French Open, he suffered a shock defeat to João Fonseca despite being two sets up. This was only the second time Djokovic lost a match after winning the first two sets (after the 2010 French Open), and the first time since 2009 he failed to reach the French Open quarterfinals.

During the 2026 Wimbledon Championships quarterfinal match against Félix Auger-Aliassime, Djokovic won in a grueling five-set match that lasted 5 hours and 15 minutes. This match was tied for the longest of Djokovic's Wimbledon career, equal to his 2018 Wimbledon semifinal against Rafael Nadal, and was the longest quarterfinal in Wimbledon history. He then lost to eventual champion Sinner in the semifinals once again in straight sets, in a repeat of the 2025 semifinal.

During the 2026 Cincinnati Open, Djokovic lost in an upset during the second round against Thiago Agustín Tirante. On 14 September 2026, Djokovic lost to Mariano Navone in the first round of the 2026 US Open in 5 sets, marking the first time since the 2006 Australian Open that he lost his opening match of a Grand Slam and the first time he lost his opening match at the US Open. As a result, Djokovic dropped out of the top 10 in the ATP rankings for the first time since June 2018.

On 6 October 2026, Djokovic won the 2026 China Open, beating Alex De Minaur in the final. Both players took a medical timeout after the first set, but De Minaur retired after one more game. This victory earned Djokovic his 7th China Open title and his 102nd career trophy, while he set the world record for the most consecutive wins from a tournament debut without ever losing, with a score of 34–0 (throughout his career, Djokovic has played exactly 34 matches in Beijing and won all 34 of them).

Three days after his triumph at the China Open, Djokovic then lost to Hubert Hurkacz in the second round of the 2026 Rolex Shanghai Masters. Despite his Beijing victory returning him to the top 10 at No. 8 in the world rankings, his defeat to Hurkacz dropped him out of the top 10 again due to him defending semfinal points from the previous year, and he dropped to No. 12.

After the Shanghai Open, he played at the Swiss Indoors with the aim of seizing a spot in the 2026 ATP Finals, where he won his first round against Ugo Humbert. Afterwards, he faced Jan-Lennard Struff, against whom he lost in 3 tight sets.

Djokovic then lost in the second round of the 2026 Rolex Paris Masters to qualifier Rinky Hijikata, which meant that Djokovic failed to qualify for the ATP Finals for the first time since 2017 and ended the year at world No. 12, his lowest ranking since 2017.

== Rivalries ==
=== Prominent rivalries ===
Djokovic has a winning record against all of his top contemporaries, including his fellow Big Three counterparts, Roger Federer and Rafael Nadal.

==== Rafael Nadal ====
Djokovic and Rafael Nadal's rivalry is the most prolific in men's tennis in the Open Era. The two faced each other 60 times, with Djokovic leading 31–29. Djokovic leads on hard courts 20–7, while Nadal leads on clay 20–9, and they are tied on grass 2–2.

Djokovic is the only player to defeat Nadal in all four majors. He is also the player with the most victories over Nadal on clay, having defeated him twice at the French Open and all three clay court Masters events, notably at the 2013 Monte-Carlo Masters, where he ended Nadal's run of eight consecutive titles. The two contested the longest major final ever played at the 2012 Australian Open, where Djokovic won in five sets after 5 hours and 53 minutes. Other classics they played include the 2009 Madrid Masters semifinal, 2011 Miami Masters final, the 2013 French Open semifinal, 2018 Wimbledon semifinal, and the 2021 French Open semifinal.

==== Roger Federer ====
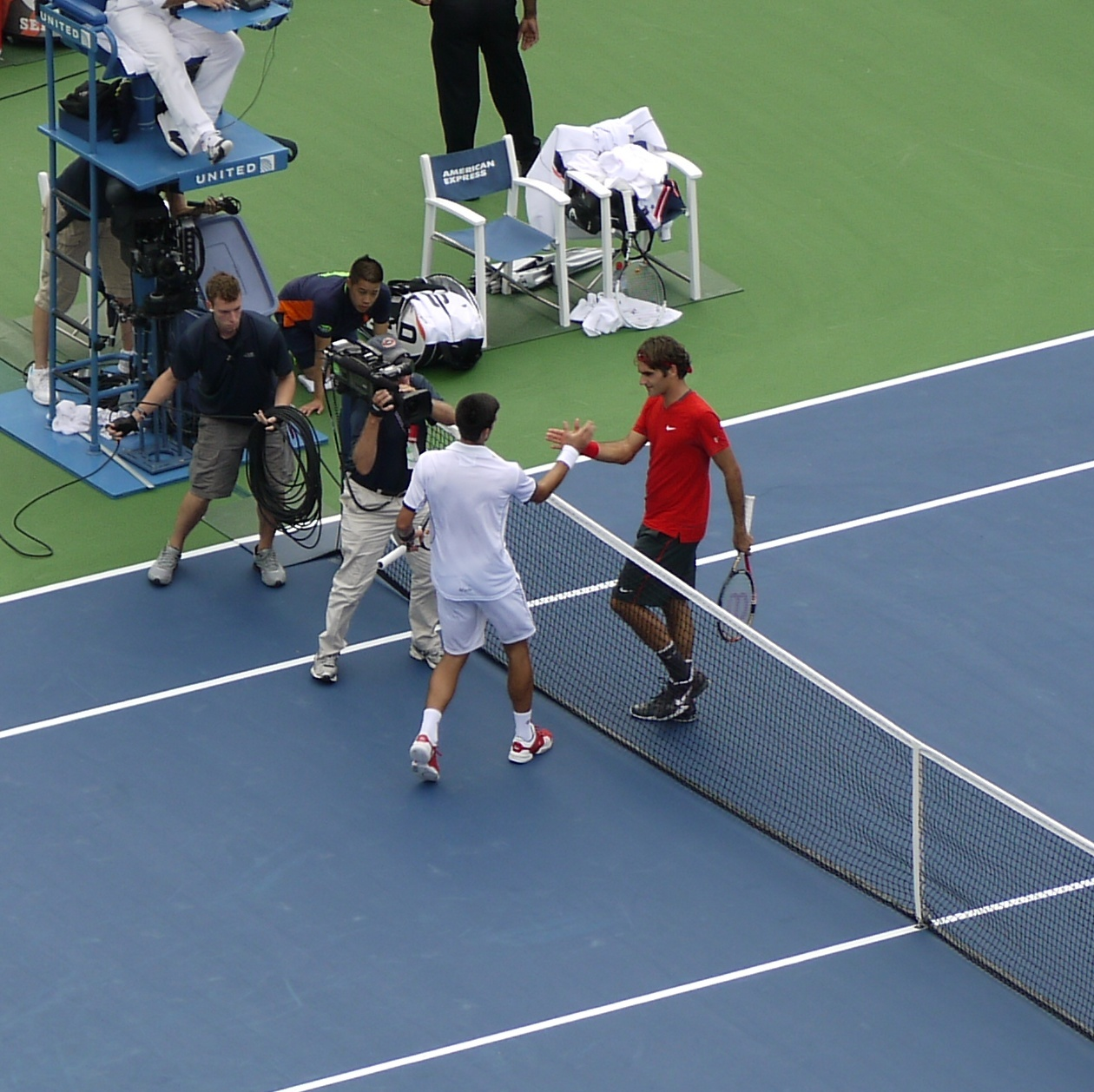
Djokovic and Federer after their semifinal match at the 2011 US Open

Djokovic and Roger Federer's rivalry is considered to be one of the greatest rivalries in tennis history. They faced each other 50 times, with Djokovic leading 27–23, including 13–6 in finals (not including a 2014 walkover in favor of Djokovic). Djokovic leads on hard courts 20–18 and on grass 3–1, and they are split 4–4 on clay.

Djokovic is the player with the most victories over Federer and the only player to beat Federer multiple times at his most successful major tournaments: four times at the Australian Open, three times at the US Open, three times at the Year-end Championship, and most notably, three times in the final of Wimbledon Championships. Their last final was at the 2019 Wimbledon, where Djokovic won in five sets in the longest final in Wimbledon history. Other notable matches they contested are the 2014 Wimbledon and 2015 Wimbledon finals, along with semifinals at the 2010 US Open, 2011 US Open, 2011 French Open, and 2018 Paris Masters.

==== Andy Murray ====
Djokovic and Andy Murray met 36 times, with Djokovic leading 25–11. Djokovic leads on hard courts 20–8 and 5–1 on clay, while Murray won their two matches on grass. Djokovic and Murray are one of two pairs to have met in each of the four major finals (the other pair being Djokovic and Nadal). The two are almost exactly the same age, with Murray being a week older than Djokovic, so they progressed through the ranks of the junior circuit together, and Murray was the winner of the first match they ever played as teenagers at Les Petits As in 2001. They were the 2015 and 2016 year-end top two players in the world, with the battle for the 2016 year-end No. 1 only being decided in the final of the World Tour Finals, which was won by Murray in straight sets.

One of their most notable matches was a three-set thriller at the final of the 2012 Shanghai Masters, in which Djokovic saved five championship points to win his first Shanghai Masters title and end Murray's 12–0 winning streak at the event. Tennis pundits have classified many more of their matches as instant classics, such as the 2011 Italian Open semifinals, the 2012 Australian Open semifinals, the 2012 US Open final, the 2015 semifinals and 2016 final at the French Open, and the 2017 Qatar Open final.

==== Stan Wawrinka ====
Djokovic and Stan Wawrinka have met 27 times, with Djokovic leading 21–6. Although this rivalry is lopsided in favor of Djokovic, the two have contested numerous close matches, including four five-setters at the majors. Wawrinka and Djokovic have met in three consecutive Australian Opens – with each match going to five sets – and a five-setter in the US Open. In the 2013 Australian Open fourth round, Djokovic won 12–10 in a fifth set, with the match being considered one of the best ever played; at the 2013 US Open semifinals, Djokovic won 6–4 in the fifth set; at the 2014 Australian Open quarterfinals, Wawrinka won 9–7 in the fifth. Wawrinka's win broke Djokovic's run of 14 consecutive major semifinals and ended a 28-match winning streak, and Wawrinka went on to win his first major title at the tournament. Djokovic got revenge the next year at the 2015 Australian Open, winning 6–0 in the fifth set.

At the 2015 French Open final, Wawrinka defeated Djokovic in four sets to claim his second major title. Later that year, Djokovic beat Wawrinka at the Cincinnati Masters and Paris Masters. At the 2016 US Open, Wawrinka beat Djokovic in a major final for a second time.

Despite Djokovic's 21–6 overall record against Wawrinka, Wawrinka leads Djokovic 3–2 in ATP finals, two of which in major finals. During Djokovic's run of 13 major finals from the 2014 Wimbledon Championships through the 2020 Australian Open, his only two losses were to Wawrinka. Contrary to most high-profile rivalries, the pair have also played doubles together.

==== Jo-Wilfried Tsonga ====
Djokovic and Jo-Wilfried Tsonga met 23 times, with Djokovic leading 17–6. Their first meeting was in the final of the 2008 Australian Open, which Djokovic won in four sets to win his first major singles title. Tsonga got revenge in their next meeting at the majors, the 2010 Australian Open quarterfinals, winning in five sets after Djokovic fell ill during the match. Djokovic then won their next match at the 2011 Wimbledon semifinals to advance to his first final there, claiming the world No. 1 ranking for the first time in the process. They met again in the quarterfinals of the 2012 French Open, which Djokovic won in five sets after over four hours. They then played a further three matches in 2012, in the quarterfinals of the Olympics, the final of the China Open, and in the round robin stage of the ATP Finals, with Djokovic winning all of them in straight sets. Their final major meeting was in the second round of the 2019 Australian Open, which Djokovic won in straight sets.

==== Juan Martín del Potro ====
Djokovic and Juan Martín del Potro met 20 times, with Djokovic leading 16–4. Djokovic won their first four meetings before back-to-back victories for del Potro at the 2011 Davis Cup and their Bronze medal match at the 2012 Summer Olympics in straight sets. Djokovic won the next four matches before he lost to del Potro at the 2013 Indian Wells Masters, where the Argentine made his second career Masters final. Djokovic got the upper hand on the rivalry once again by winning two of the most important matches between them to date: an epic five-setter at the 2013 Wimbledon Championships semifinals (which was the longest Wimbledon semifinal at the time), and a thrilling three-setter at the 2013 Shanghai Masters final. Del Potro upset Djokovic in the first round at the 2016 Rio Olympics in Rio en route to the final. In 2018, Djokovic defeated del Potro in three close sets in the final of the US Open, which was the first Grand Slam final for del Potro since his 2009 US Open victory. They played their last match at the 2019 Italian Open quarterfinal, which Djokovic won in a dramatic three-setter after saving two match points.

=== Other rivalries ===
==== Daniil Medvedev ====
Djokovic and Daniil Medvedev have met 16 times, with Djokovic leading 11–5. They have contested four Grand Slam tournament matches, with Djokovic leading 3–1. Their first major came at the 2019 Australian Open 4th round, which Djokovic won in four sets. Their next three encounters at the majors came in finals, with Djokovic winning the 2021 Australian Open and the 2023 US Open finals, and Medvedev winning his first major title at the 2021 US Open against Djokovic in the final, also ending Djokovic's quest for a calendar-year Grand Slam. Medvedev replaced Djokovic as the world No. 1 player when he rose to the top ranking for the first time in February 2022. All three major finals between Djokovic and Medvedev were straight-set wins. The second set of the 2023 US Open, which Djokovic eventually won in a tiebreaker after a grueling 104-minute battle, was one of the longest sets in US Open history.

==== Carlos Alcaraz ====
Djokovic and Carlos Alcaraz have met ten times, with both players winning 5 matches each. Despite a 16-year age gap, their rivalry has remained remarkably competitive. They first met at the 2022 Madrid Masters semifinals, where Alcaraz won a deciding-set tiebreaker. Their next meeting was in the semifinals of the 2023 French Open, a highly anticipated showdown promoted by media and the ATP itself. Djokovic won in four sets, with the match competitive until Alcaraz faltered at the start of the third set due to cramps from mental pressure and physical intensity. They would meet again soon after in the 2023 Wimbledon final, in which Alcaraz defeated Djokovic in an epic five-setter that lasted 4 hours and 42 minutes, ending his hopes for the calendar Grand Slam and his decade-long, record 45-match Centre Court win streak. The pair followed with another epic at the 2023 Cincinnati Masters final, with Djokovic prevailing in three tightly contested sets. The match was the longest best-of-three-sets ATP Tour final and the longest match in the tournament's history, at 3 hours and 49 minutes, and was immediately heralded as one of the best matches ever. Djokovic won from a set down and down a break in the second set, along with saving a championship point in the second-set tiebreaker. Djokovic and Alcaraz met twice in the summer of 2024, both in high-profile finals. On July 14, Alcaraz cruised to victory in straight sets against Djokovic in a rematch of the previous year's Wimbledon final. Three weeks later, on August 4, Djokovic defeated Alcaraz in the Olympics final held at Roland Garros. Neither player was broken on serve across two long tie-break sets, with Djokovic claiming both to complete the career Golden Slam. Journalist Steve Flink called it "the best two-set match I have ever seen", while Tennis.com listed it as its ATP match of the year for 2024. Both players met again in the quarterfinals of the 2025 Australian Open, and in the semifinals of the 2025 US Open, in which Alcaraz won in straight sets.

==== Jannik Sinner ====
Djokovic and Jannik Sinner have met eleven times, with Sinner leading the rivalry 6–5. Their first encounter came in the 2021 Monte-Carlo Masters. Djokovic won their first three encounters, with Sinner recording his first win in the 2023 ATP Finals. The pair have played some notable matches, including the final of the 2023 ATP Finals, which Djokovic won, the 2024 Australian Open semifinal, which Sinner won in four sets, and the 2024 Shanghai Masters final, which Sinner won in straight sets. They met back-to-back in the semifinals at the 2025 French Open and 2025 Wimbledon, where Sinner won both times in straight sets. Their next encounter was at the 2026 Australian Open semi-final, where Djokovic won in five sets, ending his losing streak against Sinner.

== Player profile ==
=== Playing style ===
Djokovic is an aggressive baseline player. His groundstrokes from both wings are consistent, deep, and penetrating. His backhand is widely regarded as the greatest two-handed backhand of all time, due to its effectiveness on both sides of the court and its accuracy. His best shot is his backhand down the line, with great pace and precision. He excels at returning serve in particular, and regularly ranks among the tour leaders in return points, return games, and break points won. His forehand is deemed to be underrated, yet one of the best, due to its versatility. After great technical difficulties during the 2009 season (coinciding with his switch to the Head racket series), his serve is one of his major weapons again, winning him many free points; his first serve is typically hit flat, while he prefers to slice and kick his second serves wide. He has also led the ATP Tour in their career "Under Pressure Rating" statistic, in part because of his prowess at winning deciding sets.

Djokovic has been described as one of the fittest and most complete athletes in sports history, with high agility, court coverage, and mobility, which allows him to hit winners from seemingly indefensible positions. Because of this, coupled with flexibility and length, he rarely gets aced. Todd Martin, who coached Djokovic between 2009 and 2010, noted that:

His athleticism is from another world. His return of serve is way better than any other return of serve ever, and I mean way better. Nobody has gotten so many balls back and neutralized so many good serves.

Djokovic's return of serve is a big weapon for him, with which he can be both offensive and defensive. He is highly efficient off both the forehand and backhand return, often getting the return in play deep with pace, neutralizing the advantage the server usually has in a point. Andre Agassi described Djokovic's return of serve as "the precedent-setting standard for the return". Occasionally, Djokovic employs a well-disguised backhand underspin drop shot and sliced backhand.

Djokovic commented on the modern style of play, including his own, in an interview with Jim Courier after his semifinal win against Andy Murray in the 2012 Australian Open tournament:

I had a big privilege and honour to meet personally today Mr. Laver, and he is one of the biggest, and greatest players ever to play the game, thank you for staying this late, sir, thank you ... even though it would actually be better if we played a couple times serve and volley, but we don't know to play ... we are mostly around here [points to the area near the baseline], we are running, you know, around the baseline ...

In assessing Djokovic's 2011 season, Jimmy Connors said that Djokovic gives his opponents problems by playing "a little bit old-school, taking the ball earlier, catching the ball on the rise, (and) driving the ball flat." Connors adds that a lot of the topspin that Djokovic's opponents drive at him comes right into his zone, thus his ability to turn defense into offense well.

=== Equipment ===
Entering the pro circuit, Djokovic used the Head Liquidmetal Radical, but changed sponsors to Wilson in 2005. He could not find a Wilson racquet he liked, so Wilson agreed to make him a custom racquet to match his previous one with Head. After the 2008 season, Djokovic re-signed with Head and debuted a new paint job of the Head YouTek Speed Pro at the 2009 Australian Open. He then switched to the Head YouTek IG Speed (18x20) paint job in 2011, and in 2013, he again updated his paint job to the Head Graphene Speed Pro, which included an extensive promotional campaign. Djokovic uses a hybrid of Head Natural Gut (gauge 16) in the mains and Luxilon Big Banger ALU Power Rough (gauge 16L) in the crosses. He also uses Head Synthetic Leather Grip as a replacement grip. In 2012, Djokovic appeared in a television commercial with Maria Sharapova promoting the use of Head rackets for various techniques, such as golf and ten-pin bowling.

=== Coaching and personal team ===
Djokovic has worked with numerous coaches, trainers, and advisors throughout his career. His earliest mentors were Jelena Genčić and Nikola Pilić, whom he credits as foundational influences in his development. Genčić coached him in Belgrade from 1993 to 1999, while Pilić worked with him in Munich from 1999 to 2003. In 2004 and 2005, he was coached by Dejan Petrović, during which time he rose from outside the top 300 to inside the top 100. From late 2005 to mid-2006, he briefly worked with Riccardo Piatti, before parting ways due to scheduling conflicts. From 2006 to 2017, Djokovic's main coach was Marián Vajda, who became a long-time collaborator. During this period, he also worked occasionally with specialists such as Mark Woodforde (2007) and Todd Martin (2009–2010). Djokovic's physical team included physiotherapist Miljan Amanović, fitness coach Ronen Bega (until 2009), and Austrian trainer Gebhard Phil-Gritsch from 2009 onward. In 2008, he began working with Italian agent Edoardo Artaldi, who, alongside his wife Elena Capellaro, managed Djokovic's affairs and logistics. Their professional relationship lasted until 2023, despite occasional tensions, such as during the final of the 2023 Adelaide International 1 – Men's singles. Nutritionist Igor Četojević joined the team in 2010 and helped reform Djokovic's diet, contributing to his physical transformation. Boris Bošnjaković, who had been a regular team member since 2023 took on the head coach job fully in 2025.

== Off the court ==
=== Philanthropy ===
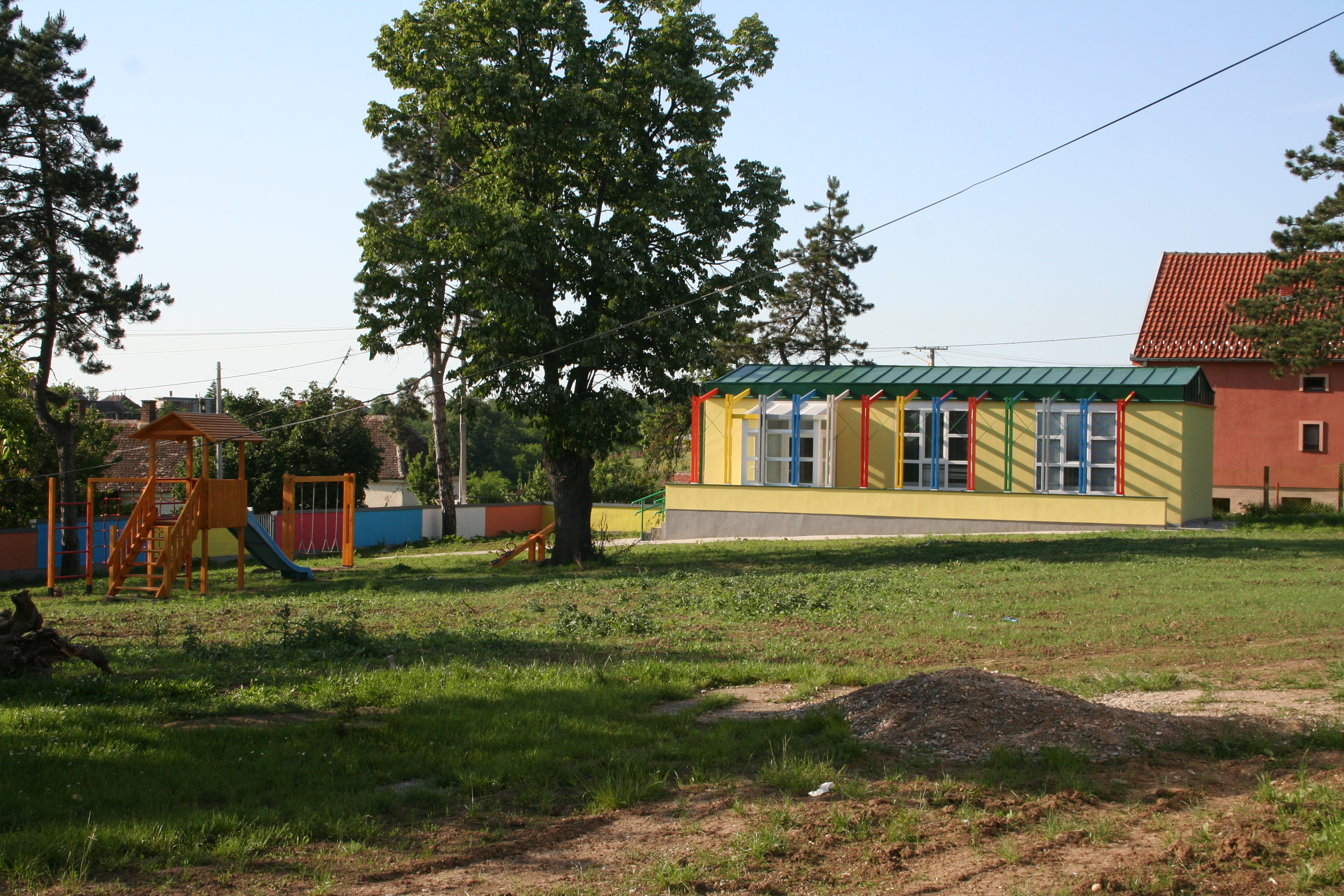
Kindergarten in Jalovik village, built by the Novak Djokovic Foundation

In 2007, Djokovic founded the Novak Djokovic Foundation. The organization's mission is to help children from disadvantaged communities grow up and develop in stimulating and safe environments. The foundation partnered with the World Bank in August 2015 to promote early childhood education in Serbia. His foundation has built 50 schools as of April 2022 and are building their 51st, and supported more than 20,800 children and over a thousand families.

Djokovic participated in charity matches to raise funds for the reconstruction of the Avala Tower, as well as to aid victims of the 2010 Haiti earthquake and the 2010–11 Queensland floods. Starting in 2007, he has established a tradition of hosting and socializing with hundreds of Kosovo Serb children during Davis Cup matches organized in Serbia. Djokovic was selected as the 2012 Arthur Ashe Humanitarian of the Year for his contributions through the foundation, his role as a UNICEF national ambassador, and other charitable projects. In August 2015, he was appointed a UNICEF Goodwill Ambassador.

During the 2014 Balkans floods, Djokovic sparked worldwide financial and media support for victims in Bosnia and Herzegovina, Croatia, and Serbia. After winning the 2014 Rome Masters, Djokovic donated his prize money to the flood victims in Serbia, while his foundation collected another $600,000. Following his 2016 Australian Open victory, Djokovic donated $20,000 to Melbourne City Mission's early childhood education program to help disadvantaged children. After the COVID-19 pandemic spread to Serbia in March 2020, he and his wife announced that they would donate €1 million for the purchase of ventilators and medical equipment to support hospitals and other medical institutions. He also made a donation to Bergamo, Italy‚ one of the worst-affected Italian provinces, as well as to Novi Pazar, Serbia, and North Mitrovica, Kosovo.

=== Sponsorships and business ventures ===
Djokovic endorses Serbian telecommunications company Telekom Srbija and German nutritional supplement brand FitLine.

On turning professional in 2003, Djokovic began wearing Adidas clothing. At the end of 2009, Djokovic signed a 10-year deal with the Italian clothing company Sergio Tacchini after Adidas refused to extend his clothing contract (choosing instead to sign Andy Murray). Tacchini doesn't make shoes, so Djokovic continued with Adidas as his choice of footwear. His sponsorship contract with Tacchini was incentive-heavy, and Djokovic's disproportionate success and dominance in 2011 caused the company to fall behind on bonus payments, leading to the termination of the sponsorship contract.

From 2011, Djokovic began to wear custom Red and Blue Adidas Barricade 6.0's shoes, referring to the colors of the Serbian national flag. By April 2012, the Tacchini deal had fallen first short and then apart. At that point, he was set to join forces with Nike, Inc., but instead, on 23 May 2012, Uniqlo appointed Djokovic as its global brand ambassador. The five-year sponsorship, reportedly worth €8 million per year, began on 27 May 2012 in Paris' French Open tennis tournament. A year later, Djokovic's long-term footwear deal with Adidas was announced ahead of the 2013 French Open. Since January 2018, Novak has been wearing Asics shoes.

In August 2011, Djokovic became the brand ambassador of Swiss watch manufacturer Audemars Piguet. Less than a month later, Djokovic signed a sponsorship deal with German car company Mercedes-Benz. In March 2012, Djokovic was announced by Bombardier Aerospace as its latest Learjet brand ambassador, thus joining the likes of actor and pilot John Travolta, architect Frank Gehry, maestro Valery Gergiev, and classical pianist Lang Lang. From January 2014, Djokovic has been endorsing French car manufacturer Peugeot. At the same time, he entered into an endorsement deal with Japanese watch manufacturer Seiko, having just ended his affiliation with their rivals Audemars Piguet. In early 2015, ahead of the Australian Open, Djokovic teamed up with Australian banking corporation ANZ for a social media campaign to raise money for local communities across the Asia Pacific region. At the same time his partnership with Jacob's Creek, an Australian wine brand owned by Orlando Wines, was announced in regards to the production and distribution of 'Made By' film series, a documentary style content meant to "show a side of Novak not seen before as he recounts never before told life stories from Belgrade, Serbia, celebrating what has made him the champion he is today."

Since 2004, the business end of Djokovic's career has been handled by Israeli managers Amit Naor (former pro tennis player turned sports agent) and Allon Khakshouri, a duo which also had Marat Safin and Dinara Safina as its clients. In June 2008, after the duo entered into a partnership with CAA Sports, the sports division of Hollywood talent firm Creative Artists Agency, meaning that the famous company started representing tennis players for the first time, Djokovic formally signed with CAA Sports. After Djokovic's contract with CAA Sports expired during the summer of 2012, he decided to switch representation, announcing IMG Worldwide as his new representatives in December 2012. On 22 May 2017, Djokovic was unveiled as a brand ambassador of Lacoste after a five-year partnership with Uniqlo.

In April 2021, Djokovic became a brand ambassador for Raiffeisen Bank International and its subsidiaries in Central and Eastern Europe. The bank will help to support Djokovic's tennis academy in Belgrade.

==== Investments ====
In 2005, as Djokovic moved up the tennis rankings, he began venturing into the business world. Most of his activities in the business arena have been channeled through Family Sport, a legal entity in Serbia established and run by members of his immediate family. Registered as a limited liability company, Family Sport initially focused on hospitality, specifically the restaurant business, by launching Novak Café & Restaurant, a franchise developed on the theme of Djokovic's tennis success. Over time, the company, whose day-to-day operations are mostly handled by Novak's father, Srdjan, and uncle Goran, expanded its activities into real estate, sports/entertainment event organization, and sports apparel distribution.

The company launched Novak Café & Restaurant in 2008 in the Belgrade municipality of Novi Beograd, the flagship location in a franchised chain of theme café-restaurants. During 2009, two more locations were added—one in Kragujevac and the other in Belgrade, the city's second, in September at the neighbourhood of Dorćol overlooking the playing courts of Serbia Open, whose inaugural edition took place several months earlier. On 16 December 2011, a location in Novi Sad was opened, however, it operated just over three years before closing in late March 2015. Banja Luka in neighbouring Bosnia got its Novak Café & Restaurant location on 16 October 2015 within Hotel Trešnja on Banj hill.

In 2009, the company bought a 250-series ATP tournament known as the Dutch Open and moved it to Serbia, where it was renamed the Serbia Open. With the help of Belgrade city authorities, the tournament's inaugural edition was held in May 2009 at the city-owned "Milan Gale Muškatirović" courts, located at an attractive spot in the Dorćol neighbourhood. The tournament folded in 2012 after four editions, and its place in the ATP calendar was taken over by the Düsseldorf Open.

In May 2015, right after winning his fourth Rome Masters title, Djokovic launched a line of nutritional food products called Djokolife. On 10 April 2016, while in town for the Monte-Carlo Masters, Djokovic opened a vegan restaurant called Eqvita in Monte Carlo. The restaurant reportedly closed in March 2019.

Djokovic has an 80% stake in biotech firm QuantBioRes, which claims to be developing a drug to treat patients who have contracted COVID-19. Their research is based on electromagnetic frequency; one biomedical scientist likened it to homeopathy and argued that it "does not reflect a contemporary understanding of how biochemistry works", while Peter Collignon commented that their website "describes a way of finding a new molecule without providing any evidence of success."

In August 2025, Djokovic became a co-owner of French Ligue 2 club Le Mans FC through the Brazilian consortium OutField, alongside Formula One drivers Felipe Massa and Kevin Magnussen, and Georgios Frangulis, CEO of OakBerry. On June 26, 2026, it was announced that Djokovic would join U.S. private equity firm General Atlantic as a Global Strategic Advisor.

=== Professional Tennis Players Association ===
In August 2020, Djokovic resigned from the Players Council of the Association of Tennis Professionals and formed the Professional Tennis Players Association (PTPA) with Vasek Pospisil. The pair served as co-presidents of the new organization to promote the interests of male and female tennis players above a ranking of 500 in singles and 200 in doubles, and wishing to give players more influence on tour.

In January 2026, Djokovic announced that he was stepping away from the PTPA, citing differences over transparency, governance, and his role within the organization.

=== In popular culture ===
Throughout the latter part of the 2007 season, including before Wimbledon and during US Open, his comedic impressions of fellow contemporary tennis players received much media play. It began when a BBC camera crew recorded some footage of the twenty-year-old impersonating Maria Sharapova, Rafael Nadal, Goran Ivanišević, and Lleyton Hewitt on a practice court at London's Queen's Club Championships just before Wimbledon. The material — consisting of Djokovic imitating the said players by exaggerating their trademark physical gestures or nervous tics for the entertainment of his coaching team, Marián Vajda and Mark Woodforde — aired during the BBC's coverage of the tournament and subsequently became popular online. Two months later, at the US Open, a phone video shot by Argentine players of Djokovic doing locker room impressions of players such as Andy Roddick, Roger Federer, Filippo Volandri, and Rafael Nadal made its way online, becoming viral. A few days later, after beating Carlos Moyá in the quarterfinals, USA Network's on-court interviewer Michael Barkann asked Djokovic to perform some impressions, and the player obliged by doing Sharapova and Nadal.

In addition to Djokovic, the national surge in the popularity of tennis was also inspired by three other up-and-coming young players: twenty-year-old Ana Ivanovic, twenty-two-year-old Jelena Janković, and twenty-three-year-old Janko Tipsarević, as evidenced in early December 2007 when a sports-entertainment show named NAJJ Srbije (The Best of Serbia), put together in honour of the four players' respective successes in the 2007 season, drew a capacity crowd to Belgrade's Kombank Arena. In May 2008, he was a special guest during the first semifinal of the Eurovision Song Contest, held in Belgrade that year. He threw a big tennis ball into the crowd, announcing the start of the voting, and together with one of the show's co-presenters, Željko Joksimović, Djokovic sang Đorđe Marjanović's song "Beograde".

Throughout late April and early May 2009, during ATP Master Series tournaments in Rome and Madrid, respectively, the Serb was a guest on the Fiorello Show on Sky Uno hosted by Italian comedian Rosario Fiorello followed by an appearance on Pablo Motos' show El Hormiguero.

Djokovic is also featured in the music video for the song "Hello" by Martin Solveig and Dragonette. The video, filmed at Stade Roland Garros, shows Solveig facing off against Bob Sinclar, another DJ, in a tennis match. When the referee calls a crucial ball "Out", Djokovic enters the arena and convinces the referee otherwise. In 2010, the Serbian blues-rock band Zona B recorded the song "The Joker", dedicating it to Djokovic.

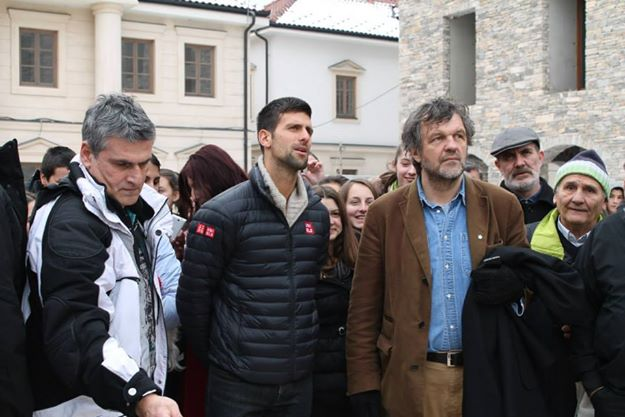
Djokovic with Emir Kusturica in Andrićgrad in January 2014, where he received the Key to the City

On 25 June 2011, at the Serbian National Defense Council's seventieth congress in Chicago, Djokovic was unanimously awarded the Order of Serbian National Defense in America I class – the highest decoration of the SND. The order was given to the twenty-four-year-old for his merits on the international sports scene and his contributions to the reputation of Serbs and Serbia around the world. The day after winning his first Wimbledon title and reaching the No. 1 ranking for the first time in his career, Djokovic went home to Belgrade for a homecoming celebration in front of the Serbian National Assembly, an event attended by close to 100,000 people.

On 28 November 2011, after returning from London, where he finished early due to failing to progress out of his round-robin group, Djokovic visited his childhood tennis coach Jelena Genčić at her Belgrade home, bringing the Wimbledon trophy along. The meeting, reportedly their first in more than four years, was recorded by two television crews – a Serbian one shooting for Aleksandar Gajšek's show Agape on Studio B television and an American one from CBS television network filming material for Djokovic's upcoming piece on 60 Minutes. The next day, 29 November 2011, on invitation from film producer Avi Lerner, Djokovic was part of the high-budget Hollywood movie production The Expendables 2 in a cameo playing himself that was shot in a warehouse in the Bulgarian capital of Sofia. However, his bit part was later cut out of the final version of the movie.

In March 2012, he was profiled on the CBS show 60 Minutes by their correspondent Bob Simon. He was named among the 100 most influential people of 2012 by Time magazine.

Djokovic has been a guest on late-night talk shows, such as The Tonight Show with Jay Leno, Veče sa Ivanom Ivanovićem, Conan, Late Night with Jimmy Fallon, Late Show with David Letterman, The Late Show with Stephen Colbert, The Jonathan Ross Show and The Ellen DeGeneres Show.

In April 2021, a team of Balkan biospeleologists named a recently discovered freshwater snail species, Travunijana djokovici, after Djokovic.

In 2022, a book titled Facing Novak Djokovic, a compilation of interviews with ATP players who described in detail what it was like to compete against Djokovic, was published.

In 2022, Nikola Vesović, a research associate at the University of Belgrade, announced that a new species of beetle in the genus Duvalius recently discovered near the town of Ljubovija, Serbia, had been named Duvalius djokovici after Djokovic.

Djokovic appears in the 2024 documentary Federer: Twelve Final Days about Roger Federer's final tournament before his retirement, the 2022 Laver Cup. In July 2024, Djokovic became the first man and the first athlete on the cover of Vogue Adria. He appeared on the front cover of the 2024 video game Tiebreak: Official game of the ATP and WTA, alongside Coco Gauff. One of the game's features is a "Novak Djokovic Slam Challenge".

=== Views on diet, medicine, and science ===
Since 2010, he has been connected with the nutritionist Igor Četojević, who additionally focuses on Chinese medicine and performs acupuncture. He allegedly discovered that Djokovic suffers from gluten intolerance, using applied kinesiology, and that he should not eat gluten, removing it from his diet. He eventually settled on a vegan diet, while later sometimes eating fish. He also claims this vegan, plant-based diet cured his persistent allergies and mild asthma. The gluten-free diet has been credited for improving his endurance on the court and playing a role in his subsequent success.

Following his elbow surgery in 2018, he stated that he "cried for three days" after it, feeling guilty, because he was "not a fan of surgeries or medications" and wanted "to be as natural as possible". He further stated his belief that human "bodies are self-healing mechanisms".

In his 2013 autobiography, Serve to Win, he wrote of a researcher who directed "anger, fear, hostility" at a glass of water, which turned slightly green after a few days, while also directing "love, joy, happiness" at another glass of water, which remained bright and crystal clear in the same period. In 2020, Djokovic spoke of his belief that some people used prayer and gratitude to turn the most toxic food, or polluted water, into healing water. He also stated that scientists [have] proven that molecules in the water react to our emotions and speech. Such claims are scientifically dubious, and generally regarded as superstitious beliefs.

=== Opposition to the COVID-19 vaccine mandate ===
During the ATP Tour's shutdown due to the COVID-19 pandemic, in a Facebook live stream with other Serbian athletes hosted in April 2020, Djokovic indicated he opposes vaccination and would not be forced to take a COVID vaccine just to be able to return to the Тour. He later clarified his remarks by stating that he is not against all kinds of vaccines, but that he is against forced vaccination. He added that he was extremely careful about what he puts into his body.

Djokovic's views came under increased scrutiny in late 2021, in the run-up to the 2022 Australian Open, after comments made by Australian government officials indicated that tennis players would need to be vaccinated to enter the tournament. Prior to the tournament, Djokovic had refused to state publicly whether he was vaccinated or not, but had made comments stating his concern over the possibility of a hotel quarantine in Australia. However, while being interviewed by the Australian Border Force in January 2022, Djokovic confirmed to the officer interviewing him that he was unvaccinated.

"The principles of decision making on my body are more important than any title or anything else."

— Djokovic, on why he is willing to forgo playing major tournaments.

Several commentators felt that Djokovic's stance against the COVID-19 vaccine could damage his placement among the all-time great tennis players, as he would not be able to participate in the major tournaments where vaccination was required for entry while others have applauded him making his own decision. He was unable to play the 2022 Australian Open, where he was the defending champion and the favorite to win. Shortly thereafter, he lost the No. 1 ranking he had held for a record 373 weeks. Due to the federal government's vaccination policy for non-U.S. citizens, Djokovic was unable to enter the United States to play the 2022 US Open, another major tournament where he was favored to win.

In an interview with the BBC on 15 February 2022, a few weeks after the tournament, Djokovic stated he does not associate with the wider anti-vax movement. However, he believes in personal freedom of choice and supports an individual's right to choose whether or not they receive a vaccine. He reaffirmed sticking to his principles and his refusal to receive a vaccine, saying that he would be willing to forgo entry into tournaments that are held in countries mandating the vaccine, even if it cost him his career records and placement among the all-time great players.

=== Faith and religious beliefs ===
Djokovic is a member of the Serbian Orthodox Church. He was baptized in May 1992 at the Žiča Monastery, alongside his mother and younger brother Marko. On 28 April 2011, Patriarch Irinej of Serbia awarded Djokovic the Order of St. Sava I class, the highest decoration of the Serbian Orthodox Church, for his contributions to monasteries of the Serbian Orthodox Church in Kosovo and charitable work in Serbia. He has said that he admired and held in high regard Bishop Amfilohije, who played a key part in helping him through a tough time during the Yugoslav Wars.

Djokovic has been reported to meditate for up to an hour a day at the Buddhist Buddhapadipa Temple in Wimbledon, as he appreciates the natural setting and serenity, and is close to monks in the complex. He has spoken of the positive power of meditation. He is a frequent visitor to the Bosnian town of Visoko and its park that is host to several meditation platforms.

=== Support of sport and sportspeople ===
Djokovic is a fan of Serbian football club Red Star, Italian club Milan, and Portuguese club Benfica, as well as Serbian basketball club Red Star. He has also shown public support for Croatia at the 2018 FIFA World Cup and when faced with criticism from some within his native country of Serbia, Djokovic replied that "sports have their 'universal language,' they erase boundaries between people, [and] overcome differences in religion, race and nationality." Djokovic has expressed admiration for Croatian football player Luka Modrić, who plays for Real Madrid. He is a friend of former Serbian tennis player Ana Ivanovic, whom he has known since the two were children growing up in Serbia. In March 2026 Djokovic attended the World Cup play-off final between the Bosnia and Herzegovina national football team versus Italy as a special guest of the Football Association of Bosnia and Herzegovina, where he was greeted with a standing ovation. His presence at the match dominated regional media coverage and public discourse, given its historically complex and often turbulent relations.

Djokovic is a member of the "Champions for Peace" club, a group of elite athletes committed to serving peace in the world through sport. It was created by Peace and Sport, a Monaco-based international organization.

=== Political statements ===
Following his victory in the first round of the 2023 French Open, Djokovic wrote "Kosovo is the heart of Serbia. Stop the violence" on the lens of a camera, in response to the recent clashes in Kosovo. The statement was criticized as inappropriate by France's then-minister of sports Amélie Oudéa-Castéra, with the Kosovo Olympic Committee asking the IOC to open disciplinary proceedings against the athlete. Djokovic later said he was against any kind of conflict but defended his statement by opining: "Especially as a son of a man born in Kosovo, I feel the need to give my support to our people and to the entirety of Serbia. Kosovo is our cradle, our stronghold, the centre of the most important things for our country. There are many reasons why I wrote that on the camera."

During the 2024–2025 Serbian anti-corruption protests, Djokovic openly supported protesting students and their demands on several occasions. Because of this, he immediately received a backlash from the ruling politicians in Serbia. Former minister Zorana Mihajlović said that "Djokovic sided with those who commit violence in the country and who want an independent Kosovo", while government-affiliated Informer called him a "failed tennis player", and "a disgrace" who "supports violence". In April 2025, while publicly reading a letter he received from one child mentioning how the child loves watching Đoković, Serbian President Aleksandar Vučić declined to read Djokovic's name, instead pronouncing "Nikola Jokić".

== Legacy ==
"I believe that numbers are numbers and statistics are statistics and, in that sense, I think he [Djokovic] has better numbers than mine and that is indisputable. It is not beneath me, nor do I have an ego big enough to try and disguise a reality that is not. This is the truth. The rest are tastes, inspiration, sensations that one player or the other may transmit to you, so that you may like one or the other more. I think that with respect to titles, Djokovic is the best in history, and there is nothing to discuss in that."

— Rafael Nadal on Djokovic's legacy.

Djokovic is regarded by many observers, tennis players and coaches as the greatest tennis player of all time, primarily for his achievements across all top-level tournaments of the men's professional tour in addition to his time spent with the world No. 1 ranking. Some media outlets, including Reuters, Sports Illustrated, ESPN, Marca, Forbes, Tennis World USA, Australian Broadcasting Corporation, and Sporting News have named Djokovic the greatest male tennis player in history.

Djokovic has won a record 72 Big Titles, including an all-time record of 24 Grand Slam titles, and holds the most weeks at No. 1, the most wins over top 5 and top 10-ranked players, has won all major and Masters events and the year-end championships at least twice (which has not been done by another player once). Djokovic also has a winning head-to-head record over his greatest rivals in one of the strongest eras of tennis, which includes multiple victories over them at the majors where they dominated; defeating Federer three times at Wimbledon and Nadal twice at the French Open. In describing how he emerged from the shadow of Federer and Nadal to eventually equal their achievements and then surpass them, Djokovic remarked "2011 was one of the best, if not the best, season I ever had. It kind of changed things around for me. After that, I started to trust myself more in the deciding matches and points. It got me to a champion's mentality. I started to believe I could beat those two guys [Federer and Nadal], because they were so dominant. They were taking away all the Slams."

Former world No. 1 Daniil Medvedev labelled Djokovic the "greatest tennis player in history" after winning his first major title at the 2021 US Open over Djokovic. Richard Krajicek and The Roar, sports opinion website, said that Djokovic should be considered for the greatest player of all time because he is the only one among his rivals who has won all four majors consecutively. Patrick Mouratoglou stated, "Novak is the most complete player of all times. That enables him to find the solution to most of the problems on court and this, on every surface. It explains why he is now in the best position to become the GOAT".

Some analysts claim that the Djokovic–Nadal rivalry ranks as the best rivalry in tennis history because of the quality of matches they produce. Rafael Nadal has praised Djokovic's peak level of performance, stating in 2011 (when he went 0–6 against Djokovic for the season) that "[Djokovic's level is] probably the highest level of tennis that I ever saw." Nadal reiterated this after a one-sided loss in the 2016 Qatar Open final, stating that "I played against a player who did everything perfectly. I don't know anybody who's ever played tennis like this. Since I know this sport I've never seen somebody playing at this level." In 2017, Nadal stated that "at a technical level, when Djokovic has been at the top of his game, I have to say that I've been up against an invincible player." Nadal has called Djokovic the greatest tennis player of all time in 2024. In 2019 Pat Cash emphasized that Djokovic, along with Robin Söderling, was one of only two players at that point that had beaten Rafael Nadal at the French Open, which Cash considers to be "the biggest challenge in tennis" (in 2024 Alexander Zverev became the third man to beat Nadal at the French Open).

In 2023, former world No. 7 Mardy Fish also declared that Djokovic in 2011 was the "best player of all time". In 2023, Boris Becker compared Djokovic to Lionel Messi, Tom Brady and LeBron James in their respective sports, saying that "For me, he is the lion king".

Tennis coach Nick Bollettieri praised Djokovic as "the most complete player ever" in 2011, and "the most perfect player of all time" in 2015:

When you look at match players in the history of tennis, I don't believe that anybody can equal everything on the court that Djokovic does. I don't think you can find a weakness in his game. His movement, personality, his return of serve, his serve, excellent touch, not hesitant in coming to the net, great serve. Overall, almost every player has a downfall; to me, he doesn't have one. He's perhaps the best put-together player that I've seen over 60 years.

Andre Agassi, stated in an interview in 2019 with the Times of India that:

The highest standard of tennis that I've ever seen is when Novak is playing his best tennis. The single level, for whatever my tennis IQ is worth, is an unmistakable standard to which everybody will strive to be.

Pete Sampras, who at the time of his retirement in 2003 was considered by some to be the greatest male tennis player of all time, stated after Djokovic earned a record-breaking seventh year-end No. 1 finish in 2021:

Seven years for him, I'm sure he sees it as a bonus to all the majors that he's won, but I think he'll appreciate it more as he gets older. He did it at a time where [sic] he dominated two of the greats, in Roger and Rafa, and he handled the next generation of players very well – all at the same time. I do think what Novak's done over the past 10 years, winning the majors, being consistent, finishing number one for seven years, to me it's a clear sign that he is the greatest of all time.

Some press reports have also called Djokovic one of the greatest athletes of all time.

Tennis pundits have classified many of Djokovic's matches as some of the greatest contests ever, such as the 2012 Australian Open final, in which he beat Rafael Nadal in five long and gruelling sets. Other matches include the five-set 2011 US Open semifinal against Roger Federer, the five-set 2013 Australian Open fourth round against Stan Wawrinka, the 2018 Wimbledon semifinal against Nadal, which lasted five brutal sets played over two days, the five-set 2019 Wimbledon final against Federer, the longest Wimbledon final in history, and the 2023 Cincinnati Masters final against Carlos Alcaraz, the longest best-of-three-sets final in ATP Tour history.

== Career statistics ==
=== Grand Slam tournament performance timeline ===
Key
W	F	SF	QF	#R	RR	Q#	DNQ	A	NH

(W) winner; (F) finalist; (SF) semifinalist; (QF) quarterfinalist; (#R) rounds 4, 3, 2, 1; (RR) round-robin stage; (Q#) qualification round; (DNQ) did not qualify; (A) absent; (NH) not held; (SR) strike rate (events won / competed); (W–L) win–loss record.
To avoid confusion and double counting, these charts are updated at the conclusion of a tournament or when the player's participation has ended.

Current through the 2026 US Open.

Tournament	2005	2006	2007	2008	2009	2010	2011	2012	2013	2014	2015	2016	2017	2018	2019	2020	2021	2022	2023	2024	2025	2026	SR	W–L	Win %
Australian Open	1R	1R	4R	W	QF	QF	W	W	W	QF	W	W	2R	4R	W	W	W	A (Note: Djokovic was scheduled to play the 2022 Australian Open, but his visa was cancelled for being unvaccinated against COVID-19.)	W	SF	SF	F (Note: Djokovic had a walkover at four events; hence, these are not counted as match wins.)	10 / 21	104–11	90%
French Open	2R	QF	SF	SF	3R	QF	SF	F	SF	F	F	W	QF	QF	SF	F	W	QF	W	QF (Note: Djokovic withdrew from the quarterfinals of 2024 French Open due to a knee injury.)	SF	3R	3 / 22	103–18	85%
Wimbledon	3R	4R	SF	2R	QF	SF	W	SF	F	W	W	3R	QF	W	W	NH (Note: The event of 2020 Wimbledon was not held due to the COVID-19 pandemic.)	W	W	F	F	SF	SF	7 / 21	107–14	88%
US Open	3R	3R	F	SF	SF	F	W	F	F	SF	W	F	A	W	4R	4R (Note: Djokovic was disqualified from the 2020 US Open after accidentally hitting a line official with a ball that was not in play.)	F	A (Note: Djokovic withdrew from the 2022 US Open due to the federal government's COVID-19 vaccination policy for non-US citizens.)	W	3R	SF	1R	4 / 20	95–16	86%
Win–loss	5–4	9–4	19–4	18–3	15–4	19–4	25–1	24–3	24–3	22–3	27–1	21–2	9–3	21–2	22–2	16–2	27–1	11–1	27–1	16–3	20–4	12–4	24 / 84	409–59	87%

=== Grand Slam tournament finals: 38 (24 titles, 14 runner-ups) ===
Result	Year	Tournament	Surface	Opponent	Score
Loss	2007	US Open	Hard	(Switzerland) Roger Federer	6–7^{(4–7)}, 6–7^{(2–7)}, 4–6
Win	2008	Australian Open	Hard	(France) Jo-Wilfried Tsonga	4–6, 6–4, 6–3, 7–6^{(7–2)}
Loss	2010	US Open	Hard	(Spain) Rafael Nadal	4–6, 7–5, 4–6, 2–6
Win	2011	Australian Open (2)	Hard	(United Kingdom) Andy Murray	6–4, 6–2, 6–3
Win	2011	Wimbledon	Grass	(Spain) Rafael Nadal	6–4, 6–1, 1–6, 6–3
Win	2011	US Open	Hard	(Spain) Rafael Nadal	6–2, 6–4, 6–7^{(3–7)}, 6–1
Win	2012	Australian Open (3)	Hard	(Spain) Rafael Nadal	5–7, 6–4, 6–2, 6–7^{(5–7)}, 7–5
Loss	2012	French Open	Clay	(Spain) Rafael Nadal	4–6, 3–6, 6–2, 5–7
Loss	2012	US Open	Hard	(United Kingdom) Andy Murray	6–7^{(10–12)}, 5–7, 6–2, 6–3, 2–6
Win	2013	Australian Open (4)	Hard	(United Kingdom) Andy Murray	6–7^{(2–7)}, 7–6^{(7–3)}, 6–3, 6–2
Loss	2013	Wimbledon	Grass	(United Kingdom) Andy Murray	4–6, 5–7, 4–6
Loss	2013	US Open	Hard	(Spain) Rafael Nadal	2–6, 6–3, 4–6, 1–6
Loss	2014	French Open	Clay	(Spain) Rafael Nadal	6–3, 5–7, 2–6, 4–6
Win	2014	Wimbledon (2)	Grass	(Switzerland) Roger Federer	6–7^{(7–9)}, 6–4, 7–6^{(7–4)}, 5–7, 6–4
Win	2015	Australian Open (5)	Hard	(United Kingdom) Andy Murray	7–6^{(7–5)}, 6–7^{(4–7)}, 6–3, 6–0
Loss	2015	French Open	Clay	(Switzerland) Stan Wawrinka	6–4, 4–6, 3–6, 4–6
Win	2015	Wimbledon (3)	Grass	(Switzerland) Roger Federer	7–6^{(7–1)}, 6–7^{(10–12)}, 6–4, 6–3
Win	2015	US Open (2)	Hard	(Switzerland) Roger Federer	6–4, 5–7, 6–4, 6–4
Win	2016	Australian Open (6)	Hard	(United Kingdom) Andy Murray	6–1, 7–5, 7–6^{(7–3)}
Win	2016	French Open	Clay	(United Kingdom) Andy Murray	3–6, 6–1, 6–2, 6–4
Loss	2016	US Open	Hard	(Switzerland) Stan Wawrinka	7–6^{(7–1)}, 4–6, 5–7, 3–6
Win	2018	Wimbledon (4)	Grass	(South Africa) Kevin Anderson	6–2, 6–2, 7–6^{(7–3)}
Win	2018	US Open (3)	Hard	(Argentina) Juan Martín del Potro	6–3, 7–6^{(7–4)}, 6–3
Win	2019	Australian Open (7)	Hard	(Spain) Rafael Nadal	6–3, 6–2, 6–3
Win	2019	Wimbledon (5)	Grass	(Switzerland) Roger Federer	7–6^{(7–5)}, 1–6, 7–6^{(7–4)}, 4–6, 13–12^{(7–3)}
Win	2020	Australian Open (8)	Hard	(Austria) Dominic Thiem	6–4, 4–6, 2–6, 6–3, 6–4
Loss	2020	French Open	Clay	(Spain) Rafael Nadal	0–6, 2–6, 5–7
Win	2021	Australian Open (9)	Hard	(Russia) Daniil Medvedev	7–5, 6–2, 6–2
Win	2021	French Open (2)	Clay	(Greece) Stefanos Tsitsipas	6–7^{(6–8)}, 2–6, 6–3, 6–2, 6–4
Win	2021	Wimbledon (6)	Grass	(Italy) Matteo Berrettini	6–7^{(4–7)}, 6–4, 6–4, 6–3
Loss	2021	US Open	Hard	(Russia) Daniil Medvedev	4–6, 4–6, 4–6
Win	2022	Wimbledon (7)	Grass	(Australia) Nick Kyrgios	4–6, 6–3, 6–4, 7–6^{(7–3)}
Win	2023	Australian Open (10)	Hard	(Greece) Stefanos Tsitsipas	6–3, 7–6^{(7–4)}, 7–6^{(7–5)}
Win	2023	French Open (3)	Clay	(Norway) Casper Ruud	7–6^{(7–1)}, 6–3, 7–5
Loss	2023	Wimbledon	Grass	(Spain) Carlos Alcaraz	6–1, 6–7^{(6–8)}, 1–6, 6–3, 4–6
Win	2023	US Open (4)	Hard	Daniil Medvedev	6–3, 7–6^{(7–5)}, 6–3
Loss	2024	Wimbledon	Grass	(Spain) Carlos Alcaraz	2–6, 2–6, 6–7^{(4–7)}
Loss	2026	Australian Open	Hard	(Spain) Carlos Alcaraz	6–2, 2–6, 3–6, 5–7

=== Year–end championship performance timeline ===
Tournament	2003–2006	2007	2008	2009	2010	2011	2012	2013	2014	2015	2016	2017	2018	2019	2020	2021	2022	2023	2024	2025	2026	SR	W–L	Win %
ATP Finals	DNQ	RR	W	RR	SF	RR	W	W	W	W	F	DNQ	F	RR	SF	SF	W	W	A (Note: Qualified but did not compete due to injury)		DNQ	7 / 16	50–18	74%

=== Year–end championship finals: 9 (7 titles, 2 runner-ups) ===
Result	Year	Tournament	Surface	Opponent	Score
Win	2008	Tennis Masters Cup	Hard (i)	(Russia) Nikolay Davydenko	6–1, 7–5
Win	2012	ATP World Tour Finals (2)	Hard (i)	(Switzerland) Roger Federer	7–6^{(8–6)}, 7–5
Win	2013	ATP World Tour Finals (3)	Hard (i)	(Spain) Rafael Nadal	6–3, 6–4
Win	2014	ATP World Tour Finals (4)	Hard (i)	(Switzerland) Roger Federer	walkover
Win	2015	ATP World Tour Finals (5)	Hard (i)	(Switzerland) Roger Federer	6–3, 6–4
Loss	2016	ATP World Tour Finals	Hard (i)	(United Kingdom) Andy Murray	3–6, 4–6
Loss	2018	ATP Finals	Hard (i)	(Germany) Alexander Zverev	4–6, 3–6
Win	2022	ATP Finals (6)	Hard (i)	(Norway) Casper Ruud	7–5, 6–3
Win	2023	ATP Finals (7)	Hard (i)	(Italy) Jannik Sinner	6–3, 6–3

=== Olympic gold medal matches: 1 (singles gold medal) ===
Result	Year	Tournament	Surface	Opponent	Score
Win	2024	Paris Olympics	Clay	(Spain) Carlos Alcaraz	7–6^{(7–3)}, 7–6^{(7–2)}

== Records and achievements ==
=== All-time records ===
Event	Since	Record accomplished	Players matched
**ATP/ITF rankings**	1973	Most weeks at world No. 1 (428)	**Stands alone**
**ATP/ITF rankings**	1973	Most weeks in top 2 (599)	**Stands alone**
**ATP/ITF rankings**	1973	Most weeks in top 3 (764)	**Stands alone**
**ATP/ITF rankings**	1973	Most weeks in top 4 (829)	**Stands alone**
**ATP/ITF rankings**	1973	Most weeks in top 5 (873)	**Stands alone**
**ATP/ITF rankings**	1973	Most weeks in top 6 (906)	**Stands alone**
**ATP/ITF rankings**	1973	Most weeks in top 7 (946)	**Stands alone**
**ATP/ITF rankings**	1973	Most weeks in top 8 (954)	**Stands alone**
**ATP/ITF rankings**	1973	13 different years ranked world No. 1	**Stands alone**
**ATP/ITF rankings**	1973	Most points accumulated as world No. 1 (16,950)	**Stands alone**
**ATP/ITF rankings**	1973	Oldest player ranked at world No. 1 (37 years)	**Stands alone**
**ATP/ITF rankings**	1973	Eight-time Year-End world No. 1	**Stands alone**
**ATP/ITF rankings**	1978	Eight-time ITF World Champion	**Stands alone**
**Grand Slam** **tournaments**	1877	24 Grand Slam men's singles titles	**Stands alone**
**Grand Slam** **tournaments**	1905	Triple Career Grand Slam	**Stands alone**
**Grand Slam** **tournaments**	1978	Champion of all four majors at once across three different surfaces	**Stands alone**
**Grand Slam** **tournaments**	1970	Career Super Slam (Career Golden Slam + Year-end Championships)	Andre Agassi
**Grand Slam** **tournaments**	1970	Career Golden Slam (All four Majors + Olympic gold)	Andre Agassi; Rafael Nadal
**Grand Slam** **tournaments**	1905	Non-Calendar Year Grand Slam	Don Budge
**Grand Slam** **tournaments**	1978	Surface Slam (major titles across all three different surfaces in a season)	Rafael Nadal
**Grand Slam** **tournaments**	1877	4 streaks of 3+ consecutive majors	**Stands alone**
**Grand Slam** **tournaments**	1877	4 seasons winning 3 Major titles	**Stands alone**
**Grand Slam** **tournaments**	1877	7 seasons winning multiple Major titles	**Stands alone**
**Grand Slam** **tournaments**	1877	38 men's major singles finals	**Stands alone**
**Grand Slam** **tournaments**	1877	55 men's major singles semifinals	**Stands alone**
**Grand Slam** **tournaments**	1877	66 men's major singles quarterfinals	**Stands alone**
**Grand Slam** **tournaments**	1877	409 match wins at majors	**Stands alone**
**Grand Slam** **tournaments**	1905	7+ finals at all four majors	**Stands alone**
**Grand Slam** **tournaments**	1905	3+ consecutive finals at all four majors	**Stands alone**
**Grand Slam** **tournaments**	1905	Most match wins at all four majors (95)	**Stands alone**
**Grand Slam** **tournaments**	1877	5 winning streaks of 26+ matches at majors	**Stands alone**
**Grand Slam** **tournaments**	1877	27 match-winning streak at majors in season	**Stands alone**
**Grand Slam** **tournaments**	1978	30 consecutive match wins at majors across three different surfaces	**Stands alone**
**Grand Slam** **tournaments**	1891	7+ titles at two majors with two distinct surfaces (hard & grass)	**Stands alone**
**Grand Slam** **tournaments**	1978	14 hard-court majors	**Stands alone**
**Grand Slam** **tournaments**	1877	Won a major from 2 sets down in multiple matches	**Stands alone**
**Grand Slam** **tournaments**	1877	Won 2 majors after saving 1+ match points	Rod Laver; Carlos Alcaraz
**Australian Open**	1905	10 men's singles titles	**Stands alone**
**Australian Open**	1905	104 match wins overall	**Stands alone**
**ATP Tour**	1970	Champion of all four majors and Year-end Championship at once	**Stands alone**
**ATP Tour**	1990	Big Title Sweep	**Stands alone**
**ATP Tour**	1990	Multiple champion at all annual Big Titles	**Stands alone**
**ATP Tour**	1990	72 Big Titles won	**Stands alone**
**ATP Tour**	1990	10 Big Titles in a season (2015)	**Stands alone**
**ATP Tour**	1990	6+ Big Titles at one tournament on hard, clay, grass and indoors (Note: Australian Open, Italian Open, Wimbledon, and the Year-end Championship respectively.)	**Stands alone**
**ATP Tour**	1990	108 Big finals	**Stands alone**
**ATP Tour**	1990	18 Big finals in a row	**Stands alone**
**ATP Tour**	1973	269 wins over Top-10 players	**Stands alone**
**ATP Tour**	1973	130 wins over Top-5 players	**Stands alone**
**ATP Tour**	1970	15 straight finals reached in a season (2015)	**Stands alone**
**ATP Tour**	1970	31 wins over Top-10 players in a season (2015)	**Stands alone**
**ATP Masters**	1990	Career Golden Masters (Note: All different Masters event titles.)	Jannik Sinner
**ATP Masters**	1990	Double Career Golden Masters	**Stands alone**
**ATP Masters**	1990	40 Masters singles titles	**Stands alone**
**ATP Masters**	1990	60 Masters singles finals	**Stands alone**
**ATP Masters**	1990	6 Masters titles in season (2015)	**Stands alone**
**ATP Masters**	1990	8 Masters finals in season (2015)	**Stands alone**
**ATP Masters**	1990	12 consecutive Masters finals won	**Stands alone**
**ATP Masters**	1990	421 match wins	**Stands alone**
**ATP Masters**	1990	521 matches played	**Stands alone**
**ATP Masters**	1990	141 entries	**Stands alone**
**ATP Finals**	1970	7 Year-end Championship titles	**Stands alone**
**ATP Finals**	1970	4 consecutive Year-end Championship titles	**Stands alone**
**ATP Finals**	1970	Winner of the Year-end Championship in three different decades	**Stands alone**
**Olympics**	1896	Winning an Olympic gold medal in men's singles without dropping a set (2024)	Laurence Doherty; Beals Wright

=== Open Era records ===
- These records were attained in the Open Era of tennis and in ATP Masters series since 1990.
- Records in **bold** indicate peerless achievements.

Time span	Records accomplished	Players matched
Grand Slam tournaments (selected records)
2008 Australian Open — 2023 US Open	24 Grand Slam singles titles	**Stands alone**
2008 Australian Open — 2023 French Open	Triple Career Grand Slam	**Stands alone**
2008 Australian Open — 2024 Paris Olympics	Career Super Slam (Career Golden Slam + Year-end Championships)	Andre Agassi
2008 Australian Open — 2024 Paris Olympics	Career Golden Slam (All four Majors + Olympic gold)	Andre Agassi; Rafael Nadal
2015 Wimbledon — 2016 French Open	Non-Calendar Year Grand Slam	**Stands alone**
2015 Wimbledon — 2016 French Open	Champion of all four Major titles at once across three different surfaces	**Stands alone**
2015 Wimbledon — 2016 French Open	Champion of all four Major titles at once	Rod Laver
2021 Australian Open — 2021 Wimbledon	Surface Slam (major titles across all three different surfaces in a season)	Rafael Nadal
2011 Wimbledon — 2021 Wimbledon	4 streaks of 3+ consecutive Major titles	**Stands alone**
2011—2023	4 seasons winning 3 Major titles	**Stands alone**
2011—2023	7 seasons winning multiple Major titles	**Stands alone**
2007 US Open – 2026 Australian Open	7+ finals at all four Majors	**Stands alone**
2010 US Open — 2016 French Open	3+ consecutive finals in all four Majors	**Stands alone**
2007 French Open — 2026 Australian Open	13+ semifinals at all four Majors	**Stands alone**
2006 French Open — 2026 Australian Open	14+ quarterfinals at all four Majors	**Stands alone**
2005 French Open — 2026 Australian Open	95+ match wins at all four Majors	**Stands alone**
2015 Wimbledon — 2016 Wimbledon	30 consecutive Grand Slam match wins	**Stands alone**
2011 Australian Open — 2023 Wimbledon	5 winning streaks of 26+ Grand Slam matches	**Stands alone**
2021 Australian Open — US Open	27 Grand Slam match-winning streak in season	**Stands alone**
2015, 2021, 2023	3 seasons winning 27 Grand Slam matches	**Stands alone**
2011—2023	7 seasons reaching 3+ Major finals	**Stands alone**
2015, 2021, 2023	3 seasons reaching all four Major finals	Roger Federer
2008 Australian Open — 2023 US Open	14 hard-court Major titles	**Stands alone**
2007 US Open — 2026 Australian Open	21 hard-court Major finals	**Stands alone**
2007 US Open — 2026 Australian Open	Most finals appearances at both hard-court Majors	**Stands alone**
Elite tournaments (selected records)
2007–2024	Big Title Sweep	**Stands alone**
2007–2024	72 Big Titles won	**Stands alone**
2007–2023	50 Big hardcourt titles won	**Stands alone**
2015	10 Big Titles won in a season	**Stands alone**
2008–2023	11 years winning 4+ Big Titles	**Stands alone**
2008–2022	6+ Big Titles at one tournament on hard, clay, grass and indoors	**Stands alone**
ATP Masters (selected records)
2007–2018	Career Golden Masters	Jannik Sinner
2007–2020	Double Career Golden Masters	**Stands alone**
2007–2023	40 Masters singles titles	**Stands alone**
2015	6 Masters titles in season	**Stands alone**
2015	8 Masters finals in season (Note: Djokovic did not play in the ninth tournament (Madrid).)	**Stands alone**
2015	39 Masters match wins in season	**Stands alone**
2007–2016	6 Miami Masters singles titles	Andre Agassi
2008–2016	5 Indian Wells Masters singles titles	Roger Federer
2009–2023	7 Paris Masters singles titles	**Stands alone**
2012–2018	4 Shanghai Masters singles titles	**Stands alone**
ATP Finals (selected records)
2008–2023	7 Year-end Championship titles	**Stands alone**
2012–2015	4 consecutive Year-end Championship titles	**Stands alone**
2008–2023	Winner of the Year-end Championship in three different decades	**Stands alone**
Rivalries & head-to-head (selected records)
2006–2024	Winning head-to-head record against each other member of the Big Three	**Stands alone**
2006–2021	25+ wins over four different opponents (Nadal, Federer, Murray, and Berdych)	**Stands alone**
2005–2025	20+ wins over seven opponents (Nadal, Federer, Murray, Wawrinka, Berdych, Monfils, Čilić)	**Stands alone**
2005–2026	Most match wins vs. top-10 players (266)	**Stands alone**
2007–2026	Most match wins vs. top-5 players (129)	**Stands alone**
2007–2024	Most match wins against one opponent (31 vs. Rafael Nadal)	**Stands alone**
2008–2017	Highest match-winning record against one opponent (22-match win lead vs. Berdych)	**Stands alone**
2005–2025	Highest unbeaten match-winning record against one opponent (20–0 vs. Monfils)	**Stands alone**
2009–2021	Highest unbeaten sets-winning record against one opponent (33–0 vs. Chardy)	**Stands alone**
2011	Highest unbeaten match-winning record against world No. 1 in a season (5–0 vs. Nadal)	**Stands alone**
2008–2020	Most major championship match wins against one opponent (11 vs. Roger Federer)	Rafael Nadal
2011–2016	5 years winning 20+ matches vs. top-10 opponents	**Stands alone**
2015	31 match wins vs. top-10 opponents in a season	**Stands alone**
2015	Defeated all top-10 players in a season	**Stands alone**
2011	5 consecutive match wins against world No. 1 player in finals (Rafael Nadal) (Note: Djokovic proceeded to defeat Nadal at the 2011 US Open and 2012 Australian Open, where their rankings were by then reversed.)	**Stands alone**
2007	Youngest player to defeat the top-3 players in succession (Roddick, Nadal, and Federer)	**Stands alone**
ATP/ITF ranking (selected records)
2011–2024	Most weeks at world No. 1 (428)	**Stands alone**
2010–2024	Most weeks ranked in top 2 (599)	**Stands alone**
2007–2026	Most weeks ranked in top 3 (764)	**Stands alone**
2007–2026	Most weeks ranked in top 4 (829)	**Stands alone**
2007–2026	Most weeks ranked in top 5 (873)	**Stands alone**
2007–2026	Most weeks ranked in top 6 (906)	**Stands alone**
2007–2026	Most weeks ranked in top 7 (946)	**Stands alone**
2007–2026	Most weeks ranked in top 8 (954)	**Stands alone**
2011–2024	13 different years ranked world No. 1	**Stands alone**
2016	Most points accumulated as world No. 1 (16,950)	**Stands alone**
2011–2023	Eight-time Year-End world No. 1	**Stands alone**
2011–2023	Eight-time ITF World Champion	**Stands alone**
2007–2023	15 times ranked year-end Top 3	Roger Federer
2007–2025	16 times ranked year-end Top 4	**Stands alone**
2007–2025	17 times ranked year-end Top 5	**Stands alone**
2007–2025	18 times ranked year-end Top 10	Rafael Nadal; Roger Federer
Other records
2006–2026	62 titles won by defeating multiple top-10 players	**Stands alone**
2009–2021	Three-peat at 8 different tournaments	**Stands alone**
2010–2023	10 winning streaks of 20+ matches	**Stands alone**
2015	15 straight finals in a season	**Stands alone**
2023	Played the longest best-of-three final by duration (3 hours, 49 minutes)	Carlos Alcaraz
2018	All-time prize money leader ($197,006,276 as of 2026)	**Stands alone**
2015	Most prize money won in a season ($21,646,145)	**Stands alone**
2004–2026	84% career hardcourt match winning percentage	**Stands alone**

=== Professional awards ===
- BTA Best Balkan Athlete of the Year (8): 2011, 2012, 2013, 2014, 2015, 2019, 2021, 2023.
- ITF World Champion (8): 2011, 2012, 2013, 2014, 2015, 2018, 2021, 2023.
- ATP Player of the Year (8): 2011, 2012, 2014, 2015, 2018, 2020, 2021, 2023.
- Laureus World Sportsman of the Year (5): 2012, 2015, 2016, 2019, 2024.
- BBC Overseas Sports Personality of the Year (1): 2011.
- L'Équipe Champion of Champions (2): 2021, 2023.
- Globe Sports Award: 2025

=== Other achievements ===
- Career Golden Slam: In 2024, by winning the singles gold medal at the 2024 Summer Olympics, Djokovic achieved the **Career Golden Slam**, which consists of a tennis player getting the achievement of winning all four majors and the Olympic gold medal during his career.
- Career Super Slam: This refers to the achievement of a tennis player winning all four majors, the Olympic gold medal, and the year-end championship throughout a career. Djokovic also secured the **Career Super Slam** by winning the singles gold medal at the 2024 Summer Olympics.
- Channel Slam: An achievement that refers to the feat of a tennis player winning both the French Open and Wimbledon in a calendar year. Djokovic secured the **Channel Slam** by winning the aforementioned titles in the 2021 season.
- Career Grand Slam: The feat achieved by a tennis player when winning the four majors in either singles, doubles or mixed doubles, throughout his career at least one time each. Djokovic secured the **Career Grand Slam** when winning the French Open singles title in the 2016 season.

== See also ==
- 2012 Summer Olympics Parade of Nations
- List of ATP number 1 ranked singles tennis players (since 1973)
- List of career achievements by Novak Djokovic
- List of Grand Slam men's singles champions
- ATP Masters 1000 singles records and statistics
- List of UNICEF Goodwill Ambassadors
- Sport in Serbia

== Sources ==
- Bowers, Chris (2014). Novak Djokovic and the Rise of Serbia: The Sporting Statesman. John Blake. ISBN 978-1-78219-770-6.

Sporting positions
Preceded by Rafael Nadal; Roger Federer; Rafael Nadal; Rafael Nadal; Rafael Nadal; Daniil Medvedev; Carlos Alcaraz; Carlos Alcaraz; Carlos Alcaraz; Carlos Alcaraz	World No. 1 July 4, 2011 – July 8, 2012; November 5, 2012 – October 6, 2013; July 7, 2014 – November 6, 2016; November 5, 2018 – November 5, 2019; February 3, 2020 – Feb 28, 2022; Mar 21, 2022 – Jun 12, 2022; Jan 30, 2023 – Mar 19, 2023; Apr 3, 2023 – May 21, 2023; Jun 12, 2023 – Jun 25, 2023; Sep 11, 2023 – Jun 10, 2024	Succeeded by Roger Federer; Rafael Nadal; Andy Murray; Rafael Nadal; Daniil Medvedev; Daniil Medvedev; Carlos Alcaraz; Carlos Alcaraz; Carlos Alcaraz; Jannik Sinner
Preceded by Mardy Fish	US Open Series Champion; 2012	Succeeded by Rafael Nadal
Awards
Preceded by Rafael Nadal	ATP Most Improved Player; 2006, 2007	Succeeded by Jo-Wilfried Tsonga
Preceded by Olivera Jevtić; Nađa Higl; Davor Štefanek	The Best Athlete of Serbia; 2007; 2010, 2011; 2015	Succeeded by Milorad Čavić; Milica Mandić —
Preceded by Rafael Nadal; Rafael Nadal; Rafael Nadal; Rafael Nadal	ATP Player of the Year; 2011, 2012; 2014, 2015; 2018; 2020, 2021	Succeeded by Rafael Nadal; Andy Murray; Rafael Nadal; Carlos Alcaraz
Preceded by Rafael Nadal; Rafael Nadal —	ITF World Champion; 2011 – 2015; 2018; 2021	Succeeded by Andy Murray; Rafael Nadal; Rafael Nadal
Preceded by Rafael Nadal	BBC Sports Personality World Sport Star of the Year; 2011	Succeeded by Usain Bolt
Preceded by Sebastian Vettel; Lewis Hamilton; Cristiano Ronaldo; Robert Lewandowski	European Sportsperson of the Year; 2011; 2015; 2018; 2021	Succeeded by Sebastian Vettel; Cristiano Ronaldo; Lewis Hamilton; Incumbent
Preceded by Rafael Nadal; Sebastian Vettel; Roger Federer	Laureus World Sportsman of the Year; 2012; 2015, 2016; 2019	Succeeded by Usain Bolt; Usain Bolt; Lionel Messi & Lewis Hamilton
Preceded by Rafael Nadal; Rafael Nadal —	Best Male Tennis Player ESPY Award; 2012, 2013; 2015, 2016; 2021	Succeeded by Rafael Nadal; Roger Federer; Rafael Nadal
Preceded by Rafael Nadal	Arthur Ashe Humanitarian of the Year; 2012	Succeeded by Roger Federer
Preceded by Xavi	Marca Leyenda; 2016	Succeeded by Luis Suárez Miramontes
Preceded by Roger Federer	ATP Comeback Player of the Year; 2018	Succeeded by Andy Murray
Records
Preceded by Roger Federer; Roger Federer	ATP Prize Money Leader; April 4, 2016 – October 30, 2017; September 10, 2018 –	Succeeded by Roger Federer; Incumbent
Preceded by Roger Federer	Most Weeks at World No. 1 March 8, 2021 –	Succeeded by Incumbent
Olympic Games
Preceded by Jasna Šekarić	Flagbearer for Serbia; London 2012	Succeeded by Ivana; Anđušić Maksimović
