= Andy Murray career statistics =

Career finals
Discipline	Type	Won	Lost	Total	WR
Singles
Singles	Grand Slam	3	8	11	0.27
Singles	ATP Finals	1	0	1	1.00
Singles	ATP 1000	14	7	21	0.67
Singles	ATP 500	9	1	10	0.90
Singles	ATP 250	17	9	26	0.65
Singles	Olympics	2	0	2	1.00
Singles	Total	46	25	71	0.65
Doubles
Doubles	Grand Slam	–	–	–	–
Doubles	ATP Finals	–	–	–	–
Doubles	ATP 1000	0	1	1	0.00
Doubles	ATP 500	3	0	3	1.00
Doubles	ATP 250	0	1	1	0.00
Doubles	Olympics	–	–	–	–
Doubles	Total	3	2	5	0.60
Mixed Doubles
Mixed Doubles	Grand Slam	–	–	–	–
Mixed Doubles	Olympics	0	1	1	0.00
Mixed Doubles	Total	0	1	1	0.00
Total		49	28	77	0.64

Andy Murray is a British former professional tennis player who was ranked world No. 1 for 41 weeks. He is the only tennis player, male or female, to win two Olympic gold medals in singles, which he did at the 2012 and 2016 Summer Olympics (since tennis was re-introduced to the Olympics in 1988). He reached eleven major finals, winning three at the 2016 Wimbledon Championships, 2013 Wimbledon Championships and the 2012 US Open, and finishing as runner-up at the 2008 US Open, the 2010, 2011, 2013, 2015 and 2016 Australian Opens, the 2012 Wimbledon Championships, and the 2016 French Open.

Murray made his ATP Tour debut at the 2005 Barcelona Open, and retired from the sport after the 2024 Paris Olympics. He won 46 ATP Tour-level singles titles. This includes his three major titles, 14 Masters 1000 titles (the fifth-most since the series began in 1990), two gold medals at the Olympics, and a title at the ATP Finals. He also won two doubles titles with his brother Jamie Murray, the 2015 Davis Cup playing for Great Britain, and an Olympic silver medal in mixed doubles with Laura Robson.

Below is a list of career achievements and titles won by Andy Murray.

== Career achievements ==
Murray reached his first Major semi-final and final at the 2008 US Open, where he lost in the final to Roger Federer in straight sets. He reached his second Major final at the 2010 Australian Open, again losing to Federer in straight sets. At the 2011 Australian Open, Murray's third Major final appearance ended in another straight sets defeat, this time at the hands of Novak Djokovic. He made his fourth appearance in a Major final at the 2012 Wimbledon Championships, becoming the first male British player since Bunny Austin in 1938 to make it to a Wimbledon final. He lost to Federer, who recovered from losing the first set to prevail in four sets. This meant that Murray matched Ivan Lendl's record of losing his first four Major finals.

A month after this defeat, however, at the same venue, Murray won the gold medal at the 2012 London Olympics, defeating Federer in three sets in the final, losing only 7 games. This was Murray's first victory over Federer in the best of five sets format. Later the same day, he and Laura Robson won the silver medal in the mixed doubles. In his fifth Major final appearance, at the 2012 US Open, he defeated Djokovic in five sets. By winning his first Major final at the fifth attempt, he again emulated his coach Ivan Lendl, who also needed five Major final appearances to win his maiden Grand Slam tournament. His victory over Djokovic took four hours and fifty-four minutes, equal to the 1988 US Open final between Ivan Lendl and Mats Wilander as the longest U.S. Open singles final in terms of time.

In addition, Murray has appeared in 21 Masters 1000 Series finals, winning 14. He qualified for the ATP World Tour Finals every year from 2008 to 2016, with his best result coming in the 2016 event in which he went undefeated in round-robin play and then defeated Milos Raonic in the semi-finals. En route to the final, he played the two longest 3-set matches in the event's history against Kei Nishikori and Raonic. In the final he defeated Djokovic in straight sets to clinch his first World Tour Finals crown, as well as the year-end No. 1 ranking.

Murray has lost 25 finals in his career, of which 17 were against the other members of the Big Four (Djokovic 11, Federer 5, Rafael Nadal 1). Between August 2010 when he lost to Sam Querrey, and August 2016 when he lost to Marin Čilić in the Cincinnati Masters, Murray's final losses all came against one of the Big Four. Additionally, in all but one of Murray's eleven grand slam finals, his opponent has been either Djokovic (7 times) or Federer (3 times) – the exception being the most recent, his win over Raonic at Wimbledon in 2016. Murray has taken 12 wins over #1-ranked players: 3 against Nadal, 4 against Federer, and 5 against Djokovic. He has won 11 out of 21 grand-slam semi-finals, with all but two of his defeats at that stage (the first in 2009 and the most recent in 2017) coming against Nadal, Federer or Djokovic.

Murray's 11 grand slam singles finals is the ninth best total of the Open Era. He is in the top 10 for most match wins at three of the four grand slams (5th at the Australian Open with 51 wins, 6th at Wimbledon with 60 wins, and 9th at the US Open with 48 wins). In Masters 1000 events (going back to 1990), his 14 titles rank him 5th overall. His win at the 2016 Paris Masters 1000 event was his 8th Tour title of the season and means that he has won 7 of the 9 different Masters 1000 events (missing Indian Wells and Monte Carlo).

== Performance timelines ==
Key
W	F	SF	QF	#R	RR	Q#	P#	DNQ	A	Z#	PO	G	S	B	NMS	NTI	P	NH

(W) winner; (F) finalist; (SF) semifinalist; (QF) quarterfinalist; (#R) rounds 4, 3, 2, 1; (RR) round-robin stage; (Q#) qualification round; (P#) preliminary round; (DNQ) did not qualify; (A) absent; (Z#) Davis/Fed Cup Zonal Group (with number indication) or (PO) play-off; (G) gold, (S) silver or (B) bronze Olympic/Paralympic medal; (NMS) not a Masters tournament; (NTI) not a Tier I tournament; (P) postponed; (NH) not held; (SR) strike rate (events won / competed); (W–L) win–loss record.
To avoid confusion and double counting, these charts are updated at the conclusion of a tournament or when the player's participation has ended.

=== Singles ===
Tournament	2003	2004	2005	2006	2007	2008	2009	2010	2011	2012	2013	2014	2015	2016	2017	2018	2019	2020	2021	2022	2023	2024	SR	W–L	Win %
Grand Slam tournaments
Australian Open	A	A	A	1R	4R	1R	4R	F	F	SF	F	QF	F	F	4R	A	1R	A	A	2R	3R	1R	0 / 16	51–16	76%
French Open	A	A	A	1R	A	3R	QF	4R	SF	QF	A	SF	SF	F	SF	A	A	1R	A	A	A	1R	0 / 12	39–12	76%
Wimbledon	A	A	3R	4R	A	QF	SF	SF	SF	F	W	QF	SF	W	QF	A	A	NH	3R	2R	2R	A	2 / 15	61–13	82%
US Open	A	A	2R	4R	3R	F	4R	3R	SF	W	QF	QF	4R	QF	A	2R	A	2R	1R	3R	2R	A	1 / 17	49–16	75%
Win–loss	0–0	0–0	3–2	6–4	5–2	12–4	15–4	16–4	21–4	22–3	17–2	17–4	19–4	23–3	12–3	1–1	0–1	1–2	2–2	4–3	4–3	0–2	3 / 60	200–57	78%
Year-end championships
ATP Finals	DNQ					SF	RR	SF	RR	SF	A	RR	RR	W	DNQ								1 / 8	16–11	59%
National representation
Olympics	NH	A	not held			1R	not held			G	not held			G	not held				A	NH		A	2 / 3	12–1	92%
Davis Cup	A	A	PO	Z1	PO	PO	Z1	A	Z2	A	PO	QF	W	SF	A	A	SF	NH	A	RR	QF	A	1 / 6	33–3	92%
ATP Tour Masters 1000
Indian Wells Open	A	A	A	2R	SF	4R	F	QF	2R	2R	QF	4R	SF	3R	2R	A	A	NH	3R	2R	3R	2R	0 / 16	31–16	66%
Miami Open	A	A	A	1R	SF	2R	W	2R	2R	F	W	QF	F	3R	A	A	A	NH	A	2R	1R	3R	2 / 14	31–12	72%
Monte-Carlo Masters	A	A	A	1R	A	3R	SF	2R	SF	QF	3R	A	A	SF	3R	A	A	NH	A	A	1R	A	0 / 10	15–10	60%
Madrid Open (Note: Held as German Open (outdoor clay) until 2008, Madrid Open (outdoor clay) 2009–present.)	A	A	A	2R	1R	3R	QF	QF	3R	A	QF	3R	W	F	3R	A	A	NH	A	3R	1R	A	1 / 13	23–11	68%
Italian Open	A	A	A	1R	1R	2R	2R	3R	SF	3R	2R	QF	3R	W	2R	A	A	A	A	A	1R	A	1 / 13	14–11	56%
Canadian Open	A	A	A	SF	2R	SF	W	W	2R	3R	3R	QF	W	A	A	A	A	NH	A	1R	3R	A	3 / 12	28–7	80%
Cincinnati Open	A	A	2R	QF	1R	W	SF	QF	W	3R	QF	QF	SF	F	A	1R	1R	3R	2R	2R	A	A	2 / 17	35–15	70%
Shanghai Masters (Note: Held as Madrid Open (indoor hard) from 2002–2008, Shanghai Masters (outdoor hard) 2009–present.)	A	A	A	3R	3R	W	A	W	W	F	A	3R	SF	W	A	A	2R	NH			1R	A	4 / 11	32–7	82%
Paris Masters	A	A	A	3R	QF	QF	3R	QF	QF	3R	A	QF	F	W	A	A	A	A	1R	1R	1R	A	1 / 13	21–12	64%
Win–loss	0–0	0–0	1–1	12–9	13–8	22–7	25–6	20–7	18–7	12–7	15–6	15–8	30–5	27–5	2–4	0–1	1–2	2–1	3–3	5–5	4–7	3–2	14 / 119	230–101	69%
Career statistics
Tournament	2003	2004	2005	2006	2007	2008	2009	2010	2011	2012	2013	2014	2015	2016	2017	2018	2019	2020	2021	2022	2023	2024	SR	W–L	Win %
Tournaments	0	0	9	26	16	22	18	19	18	19	12	21	18	17	11	6	8	4	14	19	18	12	307		
Titles	0	0	0	1	2	5	6	2	5	3	4	3	4	9	1	0	1	0	0	0	0	0	46		
Finals	0	0	1	2	4	6	7	4	6	7	5	3	7	13	2	0	1	0	0	2	1	0	71		
Hard win–loss	0–0	0–0	7–4	26–14	36–12	43–10	47–6	34–12	35–8	35–10	26–5	43–14	42–12	48–6	12–3	6–3	11–7	3–3	12–12	17–16	15–12	5–8	34 / 209	503–177	74%
Clay win–loss	0–0	0–0	0–2	4–5	0–2	7–5	9–4	6–4	12–4	9–4	5–3	11–4	17–1	18–3	9–5	0–0	0–0	0–1	0–0	2–0	0–3	0–2	3 / 55	109–52	68%
Grass win–loss	0–0	0–0	5–3	9–4	2–0	8–1	10–1	6–2	9–1	12–2	12–0	5–2	12–1	12–0	4–2	1–2	0–0	0–0	3–2	7–3	1–2	1–2	8 / 39	119–30	80%
Carpet win–loss	0–0	0–0	2–1	1–2	5–0	0–0	discontinued																1 / 4	8–3	73%
Overall win–loss	0–0	0–0	14–10	40–25	43–14	58–16	66–11	46–18	56–13	56–16	43–8	59–20	71–14	78–9	25–10	7–5	11–7	3–4	15–14	26–19	16–17	6–12	46 / 307	739–262	74%
Win %	–	–	58%	62%	75%	78%	86%	72%	81%	78%	84%	75%	84%	90%	71%	58%	61%	43%	52%	59%	48%	33%	74%		
Year-end ranking	540	411	64	17	11	4	4	4	4	3	4	6	2	1	16	240	125	122	134	49	42	–	$64,687,542		

=== Doubles ===
Tournament	2003	2004	2005	2006	2007	2008	2009	2010	2011	2012	2013	2014	2015	2016	2017	2018	2019	2020	2021	2022	2023	2024	SR	W–L	Win %
Grand Slam tournaments
Australian Open	A	A	A	1R	A	A	A	A	A	A	A	A	A	A	A	A	A	A	A	A	A	A	0 / 1	0–1	0%
French Open	A	A	A	2R	A	A	A	A	A	A	A	A	A	A	A	A	A	A	A	A	A	1R	0 / 2	1–2	33%
Wimbledon	A	A	1R	A	A	A	A	A	A	A	A	A	A	A	A	A	2R	NH	A	A	A	1R	0 / 3	1–3	25%
US Open	A	A	A	1R	A	2R	A	A	A	A	A	A	A	A	A	A	A	A	A	A	A	A	0 / 2	1–2	33%
Win–loss	0–0	0–0	0–1	1–3	0–0	1–1	0–0	0–0	0–0	0–0	0–0	0–0	0–0	0–0	0–0	0–0	1–1	0–0	0–0	0–0	0–0	0–2	0 / 8	3–8	27%
National representation
Summer Olympics	NH	A	not held			2R	not held			1R	not held			1R	not held				QF	not held		QF	0 / 5	5–5	50%
Davis Cup	A	A	PO	Z1	PO	PO	Z1	A	Z2	A	PO	QF	W	SF	A	A	SF	NH	A	RR	QF	A	1 / 6	9–7	56%
ATP Tour Masters 1000
Indian Wells Open	A	A	A	A	QF	2R	QF	1R	QF	2R	2R	2R	2R	1R	2R	A	A	NH	A	A	A	A	0 / 11	12–11	52%
Miami Open	A	A	A	A	A	A	A	A	1R	A	A	A	A	A	A	A	A	NH	A	A	A	2R	0 / 2	1–1	50%
Monte-Carlo Masters	A	A	A	2R	1R	A	A	2R	A	2R	A	A	A	QF	A	A	A	NH	A	A	A	A	0 / 5	5–5	50%
Madrid Open	A	A	A	A	A	A	A	A	1R	A	A	A	A	A	A	A	A	NH	A	A	A	A	0 / 1	0–1	0%
Italian Open	A	A	A	A	A	A	1R	A	A	A	A	A	A	A	A	A	A	A	2R	A	A	A	0 / 2	1–2	33%
Canadian Open	A	A	A	A	A	2R	1R	1R	QF	A	F	A	2R	A	A	A	2R	NH	A	A	A	A	0 / 7	9–7	56%
Cincinnati Open	A	A	A	A	A	A	A	A	A	A	A	A	A	A	A	A	QF	A	A	A	A	A	0 / 1	2–1	67%
Shanghai Masters	A	A	A	A	A	1R	A	A	A	A	A	A	A	A	A	A	A	NH			A	A	0 / 1	0–1	0%
Paris Masters	A	A	A	A	1R	A	A	A	2R	A	A	A	1R	A	A	A	A	A	A	A	A	A	0 / 3	1–3	25%
Win–loss	0–0	0–0	0–0	1–1	2–3	2–3	2–3	1–3	5–5	2–2	5–2	1–1	2–3	2–2	1–1	0–0	3–2	0–0	1–1	0–0	0–0	1–0	0 / 33	31–32	49%
Career statistics
Tournament	2003	2004	2005	2006	2007	2008	2009	2010	2011	2012	2013	2014	2015	2016	2017	2018	2019	2020	2021	2022	2023	2024	Career		
Tournaments	1	0	1	11	5	9	6	5	9	6	2	2	6	3	3	0	6	0	2	0	1	5	83		
Titles	0	0	0	0	0	0	0	1	1	0	0	0	0	0	0	0	1	0	0	0	0	0	3		
Finals	0	0	0	1	0	0	0	1	1	0	1	0	0	0	0	0	1	0	0	0	0	0	5		
Overall win–loss	0–1	0–0	1–2	8–14	5–5	6–9	3–7	6–4	12–7	5–6	6–2	3–2	7–6	4–3	1–3	0–0	9–5	0–0	3–2	0–3	1–1	3–4	3 / 83	83–86	49%
Win %	0%	–	33%	36%	50%	40%	30%	60%	63%	45%	75%	60%	54%	57%	25%	–	64%	–	60%	0%	50%	43%	49%		
Year-end ranking	708	–	1414	132	210	218	306	131	68	181	108	336	149	353	544	–	87	103	193	–	574	–			

=== Mixed doubles ===
Tournament	2005	2006	2007	2008	2009	2010	2011	2012	2013	2014	2015	2016	2017	2018	2019	2020	2021	2022	2023	2024	SR	W–L
Grand Slam tournaments
Australian Open	A	A	A	A	A	A	A	A	A	A	A	A	A	A	A	A	A	A	A	A	0 / 0	0–0
French Open	A	A	A	A	A	A	A	A	A	A	A	A	A	A	A	NH	A	A	A	A	0 / 0	0–0
Wimbledon	1R	2R	A	A	A	A	A	A	A	A	A	A	A	A	3R	NH	A	A	A	A	0 / 3	3–3
US Open	A	A	A	A	A	A	A	A	A	A	A	A	A	A	A	NH	A	A	A	A	0 / 0	0–0
National representation
Summer Olympics	not held							F-S	not held			QF	not held				A	not held		A	0 / 2	4–2

== Grand Slam finals ==
=== Singles: 11 (3 titles, 8 runner-ups) ===
Result	Year	Championship	Surface	Opponent	Score
Loss	2008	US Open	Hard	(Switzerland) Roger Federer	2–6, 5–7, 2–6
Loss	2010	Australian Open	Hard	(Switzerland) Roger Federer	3–6, 4–6, 6–7^{(11–13)}
Loss	2011	Australian Open	Hard	(Serbia) Novak Djokovic	4–6, 2–6, 3–6
Loss	2012	Wimbledon	Grass	(Switzerland) Roger Federer	6–4, 5–7, 3–6, 4–6
Win	2012	US Open	Hard	(Serbia) Novak Djokovic	7–6^{(12–10)}, 7–5, 2–6, 3–6, 6–2
Loss	2013	Australian Open	Hard	(Serbia) Novak Djokovic	7–6^{(7–2)}, 6–7^{(3–7)}, 3–6, 2–6
Win	2013	Wimbledon	Grass	(Serbia) Novak Djokovic	6–4, 7–5, 6–4
Loss	2015	Australian Open	Hard	(Serbia) Novak Djokovic	6–7^{(5–7)}, 7–6^{(7–4)}, 3–6, 0–6
Loss	2016	Australian Open	Hard	(Serbia) Novak Djokovic	1–6, 5–7, 6–7^{(3–7)}
Loss	2016	French Open	Clay	(Serbia) Novak Djokovic	6–3, 1–6, 2–6, 4–6
Win	2016	Wimbledon (2)	Grass	(Canada) Milos Raonic	6–4, 7–6^{(7–3)}, 7–6^{(7–2)}

== Other significant finals ==
=== Year–End Championships ===
==== Singles: 1 (1 title) ====
Result	Year	Championship	Surface	Opponent	Score
Win	2016	ATP Finals, London	Hard (i)	(Serbia) Novak Djokovic	6–3, 6–4

=== ATP Masters 1000 finals ===
==== Singles: 21 (14 titles, 7 runner-ups) ====
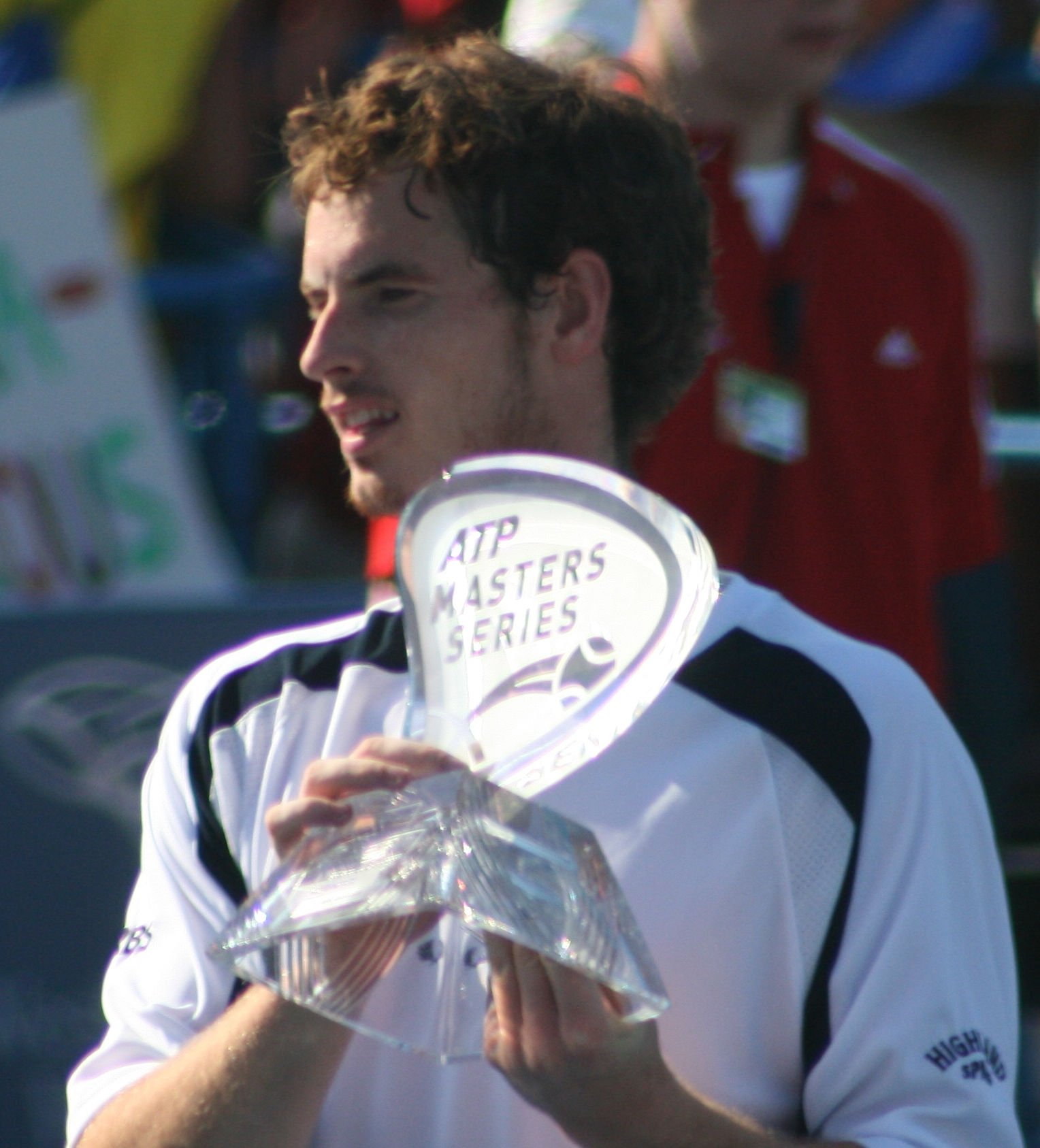
Murray won the first of his 14 Masters titles in Cincinnati

Result	Year	Tournament	Surface	Opponent	Score
Win	2008	Cincinnati Open	Hard	(Serbia) Novak Djokovic	7–6^{(7–4)}, 7–6^{(7–5)}
Win	2008	Madrid Open	Hard (i)	(France) Gilles Simon	6–4, 7–6^{(8–6)}
Loss	2009	Indian Wells Open	Hard	(Spain) Rafael Nadal	1–6, 2–6
Win	2009	Miami Open	Hard	(Serbia) Novak Djokovic	6–2, 7–5
Win	2009	Canadian Open	Hard	(Argentina) Juan Martín del Potro	6–7^{(4–7)}, 7–6^{(7–3)}, 6–1
Win	2010	Canadian Open (2)	Hard	(Switzerland) Roger Federer	7–5, 7–5
Win	2010	Shanghai Masters	Hard	(Switzerland) Roger Federer	6–3, 6–2
Win	2011	Cincinnati Open (2)	Hard	(Serbia) Novak Djokovic	6–4, 3–0 Ret.
Win	2011	Shanghai Masters (2)	Hard	(Spain) David Ferrer	7–5, 6–4
Loss	2012	Miami Open	Hard	(Serbia) Novak Djokovic	1–6, 6–7^{(4–7)}
Loss	2012	Shanghai Masters	Hard	(Serbia) Novak Djokovic	7–5, 6–7^{(11–13)}, 3–6
Win	2013	Miami Open (2)	Hard	(Spain) David Ferrer	2–6, 6–4, 7–6^{(7–1)}
Loss	2015	Miami Open	Hard	(Serbia) Novak Djokovic	6–7^{(3–7)}, 6–4, 0–6
Win	2015	Madrid Open (2)	Clay	(Spain) Rafael Nadal	6–3, 6–2
Win	2015	Canadian Open (3)	Hard	(Serbia) Novak Djokovic	6–4, 4–6, 6–3
Loss	2015	Paris Masters	Hard (i)	(Serbia) Novak Djokovic	2–6, 4–6
Loss	2016	Madrid Open	Clay	(Serbia) Novak Djokovic	2–6, 6–3, 3–6
Win	2016	Italian Open	Clay	(Serbia) Novak Djokovic	6–3, 6–3
Loss	2016	Cincinnati Open	Hard	(Croatia) Marin Čilić	4–6, 5–7
Win	2016	Shanghai Masters (3)	Hard	(Spain) Roberto Bautista Agut	7–6^{(7–1)}, 6–1
Win	2016	Paris Masters	Hard (i)	(United States) John Isner	6–3, 6–7^{(4–7)}, 6–4

==== Doubles: 1 (1 runner-up) ====
Result	Year	Tournament	Surface	Partner	Opponent	Score
Loss	2013	Canadian Open	Hard	(United Kingdom) Colin Fleming	(Austria) Alexander Peya (Brazil) Bruno Soares	4–6, 6–7^{(4–7)}

=== Olympic medal matches ===
==== Singles: 2 (2 gold medals) ====
Result	Year	Tournament	Surface	Opponent	Score
Gold	2012	London Olympics	Grass	(Switzerland) Roger Federer	6–2, 6–1, 6–4
Gold	2016	Rio Olympics (2)	Hard	(Argentina) Juan Martín del Potro	7–5, 4–6, 6–2, 7–5

==== Mixed Doubles: 1 (1 silver medal) ====
Result	Year	Tournament	Surface	Partner	Opponents	Score
Silver	2012	Summer Olympics	Grass	(United Kingdom) Laura Robson	(Belarus) Victoria Azarenka (Belarus) Max Mirnyi	6–2, 3–6, [8–10]

=== Team competitions finals ===
Finals by tournaments Davis Cup (1–0) Laver Cup (0–1) Hopman Cup (0–1)	Finals by teams Great Britain (1–1) Europe (0–1)

Result	Date	Tournament	Surface	Team	Partner(s)	Opponent team	Opponent players	Score
Loss	2010	Hopman Cup, Australia	Hard (i)	Great Britain	Laura Robson	Spain	María José Martínez Sánchez; Tommy Robredo	1–2
Win	2015	Davis Cup, Belgium	Clay (i)	Great Britain	Jamie Murray; Kyle Edmund; James Ward	Belgium	David Goffin; Steve Darcis; Ruben Bemelmans; Kimmer Coppejans	3–1
Loss	2022	Laver Cup, United Kingdom	Hard (i)	Team Europe	Casper Ruud; Rafael Nadal; Stefanos Tsitsipas; Novak Djokovic; Roger Federer; Matteo Berrettini; Cameron Norrie	Team World	Taylor Fritz; Félix Auger-Aliassime; Diego Schwartzman; Frances Tiafoe; Alex de Minaur; Jack Sock	8–13

== ATP career finals ==
=== Singles: 71 (46 titles, 25 runner-ups) ===
Legend Grand Slam tournaments (3–8) ATP Tour Finals (1–0) ATP Tour Masters 1000 (14–7) Olympic Games (2–0) ATP Tour 500 Series (9–1) ATP Tour 250 Series (17–9)	Finals by surface Hard (34–21) Clay (3–2) Grass (8–2) Carpet (1–0)	Finals by setting Outdoor (31–22) Indoor (15–3)

Result	W–L	Date	Tournament	Tier	Surface	Opponent	Score	Ref
Loss	0–1	Oct 2005	Thailand Open, Thailand	International	Hard (i)	(Switzerland) Roger Federer	3–6, 5–7	
Win	1–1	Feb 2006	Pacific Coast Championships, US	International	Hard (i)	(Australia) Lleyton Hewitt	2–6, 6–1, 7–6^{(7–3)}	
Loss	1–2	Aug 2006	Washington Open, US	International	Hard	(France) Arnaud Clément	6–7^{(3–7)}, 2–6	
Loss	1–3	Jan 2007	Qatar Open, Qatar	International	Hard	(Croatia) Ivan Ljubičić	4–6, 4–6	
Win	2–3	Feb 2007	Pacific Coast Championships, US (2)	International	Hard (i)	(Croatia) Ivo Karlović	6–7^{(3–7)}, 6–4, 7–6^{(7–2)}	
Loss	2–4	Oct 2007	Open de Moselle, France	International	Hard (i)	(Spain) Tommy Robredo	6–0, 2–6, 3–6	
Win	3–4	Oct 2007	St. Petersburg Open, Russia	International	Carpet (i)	(Spain) Fernando Verdasco	6–2, 6–3	
Win	4–4	Jan 2008	Qatar Open, Qatar	International	Hard	(Switzerland) Stan Wawrinka	6–4, 4–6, 6–2	
Win	5–4	Feb 2008	Open 13, France	International	Hard (i)	(Croatia) Mario Ančić	6–3, 6–4	
Win	6–4	Aug 2008	Cincinnati Open, US	Masters	Hard	(Serbia) Novak Djokovic	7–6^{(7–4)}, 7–6^{(7–5)}	
Loss	6–5	Sep 2008	US Open, US	Grand Slam	Hard	(Switzerland) Roger Federer	2–6, 5–7, 2–6	
Win	7–5	Oct 2008	Madrid Open, Spain	Masters	Hard (i)	(France) Gilles Simon	6–4, 7–6^{(8–6)}	
Win	8–5	Oct 2008	St. Petersburg Open, Russia (2)	International	Hard (i)	(Kazakhstan) Andrey Golubev	6–1, 6–1	
Win	9–5	Jan 2009	Qatar Open, Qatar (2)	250 Series	Hard	(United States) Andy Roddick	6–4, 6–2	
Win	10–5	Feb 2009	Rotterdam Open, Netherlands	500 Series	Hard (i)	(Spain) Rafael Nadal	6–3, 4–6, 6–0	
Loss	10–6	Mar 2009	Indian Wells Open, US	Masters 1000	Hard	(Spain) Rafael Nadal	1–6, 2–6	
Win	11–6	Apr 2009	Miami Open, US	Masters 1000	Hard	(Serbia) Novak Djokovic	6–2, 7–5	
Win	12–6	Jun 2009	Queen's Club Championships, UK	250 Series	Grass	(United States) James Blake	7–5, 6–4	
Win	13–6	Aug 2009	Canadian Open, Canada	Masters 1000	Hard	(Argentina) Juan Martín del Potro	6–7^{(4–7)}, 7–6^{(7–3)}, 6–1	
Win	14–6	Nov 2009	Valencia Open, Spain	500 Series	Hard (i)	(Russia) Mikhail Youzhny	6–3, 6–2	
Loss	14–7	Jan 2010	Australian Open, Australia	Grand Slam	Hard	(Switzerland) Roger Federer	3–6, 4–6, 6–7^{(11–13)}	
Loss	14–8	Aug 2010	Los Angeles Open, US	250 Series	Hard	(United States) Sam Querrey	7–5, 6–7^{(2–7)}, 3–6	
Win	15–8	Aug 2010	Canadian Open, Canada (2)	Masters 1000	Hard	(Switzerland) Roger Federer	7–5, 7–5	
Win	16–8	Oct 2010	Shanghai Masters, China	Masters 1000	Hard	(Switzerland) Roger Federer	6–3, 6–2	
Loss	16–9	Jan 2011	Australian Open, Australia	Grand Slam	Hard	(Serbia) Novak Djokovic	4–6, 2–6, 3–6	
Win	17–9	Jun 2011	Queen's Club Championships, UK (2)	250 Series	Grass	(France) Jo-Wilfried Tsonga	3–6, 7–6^{(7–2)}, 6–4	
Win	18–9	Aug 2011	Cincinnati Open, US (2)	Masters 1000	Hard	(Serbia) Novak Djokovic	6–4, 3–0 ret.	
Win	19–9	Oct 2011	Thailand Open, Thailand	250 Series	Hard (i)	(United States) Donald Young	6–2, 6–0	
Win	20–9	Oct 2011	Japan Open, Japan	500 Series	Hard	(Spain) Rafael Nadal	3–6, 6–2, 6–0	
Win	21–9	Oct 2011	Shanghai Masters, China (2)	Masters 1000	Hard	(Spain) David Ferrer	7–5, 6–4	
Win	22–9	Jan 2012	Brisbane International, Australia	250 Series	Hard	(Ukraine) Alexandr Dolgopolov	6–1, 6–3	
Loss	22–10	Mar 2012	Dubai Tennis Championships, UAE	500 Series	Hard	(Switzerland) Roger Federer	5–7, 4–6	
Loss	22–11	Apr 2012	Miami Open, US	Masters 1000	Hard	(Serbia) Novak Djokovic	1–6, 6–7^{(4–7)}	
Loss	22–12	Jul 2012	Wimbledon, UK	Grand Slam	Grass	(Switzerland) Roger Federer	6–4, 5–7, 3–6, 4–6	
Win	23–12	Aug 2012	Olympic Games, UK	Olympics	Grass	(Switzerland) Roger Federer	6–2, 6–1, 6–4	
Win	24–12	Sep 2012	US Open, US	Grand Slam	Hard	(Serbia) Novak Djokovic	7–6^{(12–10)}, 7–5, 2–6, 3–6, 6–2	
Loss	24–13	Oct 2012	Shanghai Masters, China	Masters 1000	Hard	(Serbia) Novak Djokovic	7–5, 6–7^{(11–13)}, 3–6	
Win	25–13	Jan 2013	Brisbane International, Australia (2)	250 Series	Hard	(Bulgaria) Grigor Dimitrov	7–6^{(7–0)}, 6–4	
Loss	25–14	Jan 2013	Australian Open, Australia	Grand Slam	Hard	(Serbia) Novak Djokovic	7–6^{(7–2)}, 6–7^{(3–7)}, 3–6, 2–6	
Win	26–14	Mar 2013	Miami Open, US (2)	Masters 1000	Hard	(Spain) David Ferrer	2–6, 6–4, 7–6^{(7–1)}	
Win	27–14	Jun 2013	Queen's Club Championships, UK (3)	250 Series	Grass	(Croatia) Marin Čilić	5–7, 7–5, 6–3	
Win	28–14	Jul 2013	Wimbledon, UK	Grand Slam	Grass	(Serbia) Novak Djokovic	6–4, 7–5, 6–4	
Win	29–14	Sep 2014	Shenzhen Open, China	250 Series	Hard	(Spain) Tommy Robredo	5–7, 7–6^{(11–9)}, 6–1	
Win	30–14	Oct 2014	Vienna Open, Austria	250 Series	Hard (i)	(Spain) David Ferrer	5–7, 6–2, 7–5	
Win	31–14	Oct 2014	Valencia Open, Spain (2)	500 Series	Hard (i)	(Spain) Tommy Robredo	3–6, 7–6^{(9–7)}, 7–6^{(10–8)}	
Loss	31–15	Feb 2015	Australian Open, Australia	Grand Slam	Hard	(Serbia) Novak Djokovic	6–7^{(5–7)}, 7–6^{(7–4)}, 3–6, 0–6	
Loss	31–16	Apr 2015	Miami Open, US	Masters 1000	Hard	(Serbia) Novak Djokovic	6–7^{(3–7)}, 6–4, 0–6	
Win	32–16	May 2015	Bavarian Championships, Germany	250 Series	Clay	(Germany) Philipp Kohlschreiber	7–6^{(7–4)}, 5–7, 7–6^{(7–4)}	
Win	33–16	May 2015	Madrid Open, Spain (2)	Masters 1000	Clay	(Spain) Rafael Nadal	6–3, 6–2	
Win	34–16	Jun 2015	Queen's Club Championships, UK (4)	500 Series	Grass	(South Africa) Kevin Anderson	6–3, 6–4	
Win	35–16	Aug 2015	Canadian Open, Canada (3)	Masters 1000	Hard	(Serbia) Novak Djokovic	6–4, 4–6, 6–3	
Loss	35–17	Nov 2015	Paris Masters, France	Masters 1000	Hard (i)	(Serbia) Novak Djokovic	2–6, 4–6	
Loss	35–18	Jan 2016	Australian Open, Australia	Grand Slam	Hard	(Serbia) Novak Djokovic	1–6, 5–7, 6–7^{(3–7)}	
Loss	35–19	May 2016	Madrid Open, Spain	Masters 1000	Clay	(Serbia) Novak Djokovic	2–6, 6–3, 3–6	
Win	36–19	May 2016	Italian Open, Italy	Masters 1000	Clay	(Serbia) Novak Djokovic	6–3, 6–3	
Loss	36–20	Jun 2016	French Open, France	Grand Slam	Clay	(Serbia) Novak Djokovic	6–3, 1–6, 2–6, 4–6	
Win	37–20	Jun 2016	Queen's Club Championships, UK (5)	500 Series	Grass	(Canada) Milos Raonic	6–7^{(5–7)}, 6–4, 6–3	
Win	38–20	Jul 2016	Wimbledon, UK (2)	Grand Slam	Grass	(Canada) Milos Raonic	6–4, 7–6^{(7–3)}, 7–6^{(7–2)}	
Win	39–20	Aug 2016	Olympic Games, Brazil (2)	Olympics	Hard	(Argentina) Juan Martín del Potro	7–5, 4–6, 6–2, 7–5	
Loss	39–21	Aug 2016	Cincinnati Open, US	Masters 1000	Hard	(Croatia) Marin Čilić	4–6, 5–7	
Win	40–21	Oct 2016	China Open, China	500 Series	Hard	(Bulgaria) Grigor Dimitrov	6–4, 7–6^{(7–2)}	
Win	41–21	Oct 2016	Shanghai Masters, China (3)	Masters 1000	Hard	(Spain) Roberto Bautista Agut	7–6^{(7–1)}, 6–1	
Win	42–21	Oct 2016	Vienna Open, Austria (2)	500 Series	Hard (i)	(France) Jo-Wilfried Tsonga	6–3, 7–6^{(8–6)}	
Win	43–21	Nov 2016	Paris Masters, France	Masters 1000	Hard (i)	(United States) John Isner	6–3, 6–7^{(4–7)}, 6–4	
Win	44–21	Nov 2016	ATP World Tour Finals, UK	Tour Finals	Hard (i)	(Serbia) Novak Djokovic	6–3, 6–4	
Loss	44–22	Jan 2017	Qatar Open, Qatar	250 Series	Hard	(Serbia) Novak Djokovic	3–6, 7–5, 4–6	
Win	45–22	Mar 2017	Dubai Tennis Championships, UAE	500 Series	Hard	(Spain) Fernando Verdasco	6–3, 6–2	
Win	46–22	Oct 2019	European Open, Belgium	250 Series	Hard (i)	(Switzerland) Stan Wawrinka	3–6, 6–4, 6–4	
Loss	46–23	Jan 2022	Sydney International, Australia	250 Series	Hard	(Russia) Aslan Karatsev	3–6, 3–6	
Loss	46–24	Jun 2022	Stuttgart Open, Germany	250 Series	Grass	(Italy) Matteo Berrettini	4–6, 7–5, 3–6	
Loss	46–25	Feb 2023	Qatar Open, Qatar	250 Series	Hard	Daniil Medvedev	4–6, 4–6	

=== Doubles: 5 (3 titles, 2 runner-ups) ===
Legend Grand Slam tournaments (0–0) ATP Tour Finals (0–0) ATP Tour Masters 1000 (0–1) ATP Tour 500 Series (3–0) ATP Tour 250 Series (0–1)	Finals by surface Hard (2–2) Clay (0–0) Grass (1–0) Carpet (0–0)	Finals by setting Outdoor (2–1) Indoor (1–1)

Result	W–L	Date	Tournament	Tier	Surface	Partner	Opponents	Score	Ref
Loss	0–1	Oct 2006	Thailand Open, Thailand	International	Hard (i)	(United Kingdom) Jamie Murray	(Israel) Jonathan Erlich (Israel) Andy Ram	2–6, 6–2, [4–10]	
Win	1–1	Nov 2010	Valencia Open, Spain	500 Series	Hard (i)	(United Kingdom) Jamie Murray	(India) Mahesh Bhupathi (Belarus) Max Mirnyi	7–6^{(10–8)}, 5–7, [10–7]	
Win	2–1	Oct 2011	Japan Open, Japan	500 Series	Hard	(United Kingdom) Jamie Murray	(Czech Republic) František Čermák (Slovakia) Filip Polášek	6–1, 6–4	
Loss	2–2	Aug 2013	Canadian Open, Canada	Masters 1000	Hard	(United Kingdom) Colin Fleming	(Austria) Alexander Peya (Brazil) Bruno Soares	4–6, 6–7^{(4–7)}	
Win	3–2	Jun 2019	Queen's Club Championships, UK	500 Series	Grass	(Spain) Feliciano López	(United States) Rajeev Ram (United Kingdom) Joe Salisbury	7–6^{(8–6)}, 5–7, [10–5]	

== ATP Challenger finals ==
=== Singles: 6 (5 titles, 1 runner-up) ===
Result	W–L	Date	Tournament	Surface	Opponent	Score
Win	1–0	Jul 2005	Aptos, USA	Hard	(United States) Rajeev Ram	6–4, 6–3
Win	2–0	Aug 2005	Binghamton, USA	Hard	(Colombia) Alejandro Falla	7–6^{(7–3)}, 6–3
Loss	2–1	Feb 2021	Biella, Italy	Hard (i)	(Ukraine) Illya Marchenko	2–6, 4–6
Win	3–1	May 2023	Aix-en-Provence, France	Clay	(United States) Tommy Paul	2–6, 6–1, 6–2
Win	4–1	Jun 2023	Surbiton, UK	Grass	(Austria) Jurij Rodionov	6–3, 6–2
Win	5–1	Jun 2023	Nottingham, UK	Grass	(France) Arthur Cazaux	6–4, 6–4

== ITF Futures finals ==
=== Singles: 5 (5 titles) ===
Result	W–L	Date	Tournament	Surface	Opponent	Score
Win	1–0	Sep 2003	Great Britain F10, Glasgow	Hard (i)	(Belgium) Steve Darcis	6–3, 3–6, 6–3
Win	2–0	Aug 2004	Spain F17, Xàtiva	Clay	(Spain) Antonio Baldellou-Esteva	6–2, 6–4
Win	3–0	Aug 2004	Italy F22, Rome	Clay	(Belgium) Dominique Coene	6–0, 6–3
Win	4–0	Dec 2004	Spain F34, Ourense	Hard (i)	(Latvia) Andis Juška	1–6, 6–3, 7–5
Win	5–0	Dec 2004	Spain F34A, Pontevedra	Clay (i)	(France) Nicolas Tourte	6–4, 5–7, 7–5

=== Doubles: 1 (1 runner-up) ===
Result	W–L	Date	Tournament	Surface	Partner	Opponents	Score
Loss	0–1	Sep 2003	Great Britain F10, Glasgow	Hard (i)	(United Kingdom) Guy Thomas	(United Kingdom) Dan Kiernan (United Kingdom) David Sherwood	7–6^{(7–2)}, 0–6, 0–6

== ATP ranking ==
Andy Murray has spent in total 41 consecutive weeks as ATP world No. 1, from November 7, 2016 to August 20, 2017.

Year	2003	2004	2005	2006	2007	2008	2009	2010	2011	2012	2013	2014	2015	2016	2017	2018	2019	2020	2021	2022	2023	2024
High	537	410	63	17	8	4	2	3	3	3	2	4	2	1	1	16	125	110	102	47	36	42
Low	785	569	422	64	19	22	4	5	5	4	4	12	6	3	16	839	503	134	172	135	70	136
End	540	411	64	17	11	4	4	4	4	3	4	6	2	1	16	240	125	122	134	49	42	160

Weeks in top	Total weeks
No. 1	41
top 5	429
top 10	494
top 20	598
top 50	709
top 100	785

== Head-to-head records ==
=== Record against top-10 players ===
Murray's match record against those who have been ranked in the top 10, with those who are active in boldface.

Player	Years	MP	Record	Win%	Hard	Clay	Grass	Carp.	Last match
Number 1 ranked players
(Spain) Juan Carlos Ferrero	2009	3	3–0	100%	1–0	–	2–0	–	Won (6–1, 6–3) at 2009 Canada
(Spain) Carlos Moyá	2006–08	2	2–0	100%	2–0	–	–	–	Won (2–6, 6–3, 6–1) at 2008 Cincinnati
(Australia) Lleyton Hewitt	2006	1	1–0	100%	1–0	–	–	–	Won (2–6, 6–1, 7–6^{(7–3)}) at 2006 San Jose
(United States) Andy Roddick	2006–11	11	8–3	73%	6–2	–	2–1	–	Won (6–2, 6–2) at 2011 Paris
(Spain) **Carlos Alcaraz**	2021	2	1–1	50%	1–1	–	–	–	Lost (3–6, 4–6) at 2021 Vienna
(Switzerland) Roger Federer	2005–15	25	11–14	44%	10–12	–	1–2	–	Lost (4–6, 6–7^{(6–8)}) at 2015 Cincinnati
(Serbia) **Novak Djokovic**	2006–17	36	11–25	31%	8–20	1–5	2–0	–	Lost (3–6, 7–5, 4–6) at 2017 Doha
(Spain) Rafael Nadal	2007–16	24	7–17	29%	5–7	2–7	0–3	–	Won (7–5, 6–4) at 2016 Madrid
(Russia) Marat Safin	2005	1	0–1	0%	0–1	–	–	–	Lost (4–6, 6–1, 1–6) at 2005 Cincinnati
(Russia) **Daniil Medvedev**	2019–23	3	0–3	0%	0–3	–	–	–	Lost (4–6, 4–6) at 2023 Doha
Number 2 ranked players
(Germany) **Alexander Zverev**	2016–23	4	3–1	75%	3–1	–	–	–	Won (7–6^{(7–5)}, 2–6, 7–5) at 2023 Doha
(Germany) Tommy Haas	2007–08	3	2–1	67%	1–1	–	1–0	–	Won (6–4, 6–7^{(4–7)}, 6–3, 6–2) at 2008 Wimbledon
(Norway) **Casper Ruud**	2021	1	0–1	0%	0–1	–	–	–	Lost (5–7, 4–6) at 2021 San Diego
Number 3 ranked players
(Croatia) **Marin Čilić**	2007–16	15	12–3	80%	7–3	1–0	4–0	–	Won (6–3, 6–2) at 2016 ATP Finals
(Argentina) David Nalbandian	2005–12	7	5–2	71%	4–1	1–0	0–1	–	Won (6–1, 4–6, 7–5) at 2012 Rome
(Spain) David Ferrer	2006–16	20	14–6	70%	12–2	1–4	1–0	–	Won (6–2, 6–3) at 2016 Beijing
(Argentina) Juan Martín del Potro	2008–17	10	7–3	70%	5–2	2–1	–	–	Won (7–6^{(10–8)}, 7–5, 6–0) at 2017 French Open
(Canada) **Milos Raonic**	2012–20	13	9–4	69%	5–3	2–1	2–0	–	Lost (2–6, 2–6) at 2020 Cincinnati
(Bulgaria) **Grigor Dimitrov**	2011–24	13	8–5	62%	8–4	–	0–1	–	Lost (6–4, 5–7, 2–6) at 2024 Brisbane
(Russia) Nikolay Davydenko	2006–12	10	6–4	60%	4–4	1–0	1–0	–	Won (6–1, 6–1, 6–4) at 2012 Wimbledon
(Austria) **Dominic Thiem**	2014–22	5	3–2	60%	2–1	1–1	–	–	Won (6–3, 6–4) at 2022 Madrid
(Switzerland) **Stan Wawrinka**	2005–22	22	13–9	59%	9–4	1–5	3–0	–	Won (7–6^{(7–3)}, 5–7, 7–5) at 2022 Cincinnati
(Croatia) Ivan Ljubičić	2006–11	7	4–3	57%	3–2	–	1–0	0–1	Won (6–4, 4–6, 6–1, 7–6^{(7–4)}) at 2011 Wimbledon
(Italy) **Jannik Sinner**	2021–22	2	1–1	50%	1–1	–	–	–	Lost (5–7, 2–6) at 2022 Dubai
(Greece) **Stefanos Tsitsipas**	2021–23	3	1–2	33%	0–1	–	1–1	–	Lost (6–7^{(3–7)}, 7–6^{(7–2)}, 6–4, 6–7^{(3–7)}, 4–6) at 2023 Wimbledon
Number 4 ranked players
(Sweden) Jonas Björkman	2007	1	1–0	100%	1–0	–	–	–	Won (5–7, 6–3, 6–1, 4–6, 6–1) at 2007 US Open
(France) Sébastien Grosjean	2008	1	1–0	100%	–	–	1–0	–	Won (2–0, ret.) at 2008 Queen's
(Japan) **Kei Nishikori**	2011–17	11	9–2	82%	7–2	2–0	–	–	Won (2–6, 6–1, 7–6^{(7–0)}, 6–1) at 2017 French Open
(United Kingdom) Tim Henman	2005–06	4	3–1	75%	2–1	–	–	1–0	Won (2–6, 6–1, 7–6^{(7–0)}, 6–1) at 2006 Bangkok
(United States) James Blake	2006–09	3	2–1	67%	1–0	0–1	1–0	–	Won (6–3, 6–7^{(5–7)}, 7–6^{(7–4)}) at 2009 Paris
(Czech Republic) Tomáš Berdych	2005–17	17	11–6	65%	8–3	1–3	1–0	1–0	Won (6–3, 6–4) at 2017 Doha
(Sweden) Robin Söderling	2005–10	5	3–2	60%	3–2	–	–	–	Won (6–2, 6–4) at 2010 ATP Finals
Number 5 ranked players
(Germany) Rainer Schüttler	2006–08	2	2–0	100%	2–0	–	–	–	Won (1–6, 6–0, 6–1) at 2008 Doha
(France) Jo-Wilfried Tsonga	2007–16	16	14–2	88%	8–2	–	6–0	–	Won (6–3, 7–6^{(8–6)}) at 2016 Vienna
(South Africa) **Kevin Anderson**	2010–16	8	6–2	75%	4–2	–	2–0	–	Won (6–3, 6–2) at 2016 Cincinnati
(Spain) Tommy Robredo	2006–15	8	6–2	75%	4–2	1–0	1–0	–	Won (6–4, 7–5) at 2015 Canada
(Chile) Fernando González	2005–09	3	1–2	33%	1–0	0–1	–	0–1	Lost (3–6, 6–3, 0–6, 4–6) at 2009 French Open
(Russia) **Andrey Rublev**	2017–24	3	1–2	33%	1–2	–	–	–	Lost (6–7^{(3–7)}, 1–6) at 2024 Indian Wells
(Czech Republic) Jiří Novák	2006	1	0–1	0%	0–1	–	–	–	Lost (3–6, 6–7^{(1–7)}) at 2006 Tokyo
(United States) **Taylor Fritz**	2022–23	2	0–2	0%	0–2	–	–	–	Lost (7–6^{(7–2)}, 3–6, 4–6) at 2023 Washington
Number 6 ranked players
(France) Gilles Simon	2007–22	19	16–3	84%	9–2	5–1	2–0	–	Lost (6–2, 5–7, 3–6) at 2022 Paris
(France) **Gaël Monfils**	2006–14	6	4–2	67%	2–1	2–1	–	–	Won (6–4, 6–1, 4–6, 1–6, 6–0) at 2014 French Open
(Italy) **Matteo Berrettini**	2019–23	5	2–3	40%	2–1	–	0–2	–	Won (6–3, 6–3, 4–6, 6–7^{(7–9)}, 7–6^{(10–6)}) at 2023 Australian Open
(Canada) **Félix Auger-Aliassime**	2020–22	2	0–2	0%	0–2	–	–	–	Lost (3–6, 4–6) at 2022 Rotterdam
Number 7 ranked players
(Belgium) **David Goffin**	2014–24	8	8–0	100%	5–0	2–0	1–0	–	Won (6–3, 6–2) at 2024 Indian Wells
(Spain) **Fernando Verdasco**	2007–20	17	13–4	76%	9–4	1–0	2–0	1–0	Lost (4–6, 4–6) at 2020 Cologne
(France) **Richard Gasquet**	2006–21	13	9–4	69%	4–3	3–1	2–0	–	Won (6–4, 6–4) at 2021 Cincinnati
(Sweden) Thomas Johansson	2005–08	3	2–1	67%	2–0	–	0–1	–	Won (6–4, 6–4) at 2008 Canada
(United States) Mardy Fish	2005–15	9	5–4	56%	4–3	–	1–1	–	Won (6–4, 7–6^{(7–1)}) at 2015 Cincinnati
(Croatia) Mario Ančić	2006–09	5	2–3	40%	2–2	0–1	–	–	Won (6–1, 6–2) at 2009 Rotterdam
Number 8 ranked players
(Austria) Jürgen Melzer	2008–14	7	7–0	100%	5–0	1–0	1–0	–	Won (6–3, 6–3) at 2014 Valencia
(Russia) Mikhail Youzhny	2007–13	4	4–0	100%	2–0	–	1–0	1–0	Won (6–2, 6–3) at 2013 Cincinnati
(Argentina) Guillermo Cañas	2007	1	1–0	100%	1–0	–	–	–	Won (7–6^{(7–2)}, 6–4) at 2007 Matz
(Russia) **Karen Khachanov**	2017	1	1–0	100%	–	1–0	–	–	Won (6–3, 6–4, 6–4) at 2017 French Open
(United States) John Isner	2010–22	9	8–1	89%	7–0	1–0	0–1	–	Lost (4–6, 6–7^{(4–7)}, 7–6^{(7–3)}, 4–6) at 2022 Wimbledon
(Czech Republic) Radek Štěpánek	2005–16	9	7–2	78%	3–1	3–0	1–1	–	Won (3–6, 3–6, 6–0, 6–3, 7–5) at 2016 French Open
(Cyprus) Marcos Baghdatis	2006–12	8	5–3	63%	2–2	1–0	2–1	–	Won (4–6, 6–1, 6–4) at 2012 Olympics
(Serbia) Janko Tipsarević	2006–12	8	5–3	63%	3–2	1–0	1–1	–	Won (4–6, 6–3, 6–4) at 2012 Miami
(United Kingdom) **Cameron Norrie**	2019–22	2	1–1	50%	1–1	–	–	–	Lost (6–3, 3–6, 4–6) at 2022 Cincinnati
(Poland) **Hubert Hurkacz**	2021	3	1–2	33%	1–2	–	–	–	Won (6–4, 6–7^{(6–8)}, 6–3) at 2021 Vienna
(Argentina) **Diego Schwartzman**	2021	1	0–1	0%	0–1	–	–	–	Lost (4–6, 6–7^{(6–8)}) at 2021 Antwerp
Number 9 ranked players
(Chile) Nicolás Massú	2006–09	2	2–0	100%	1–0	–	1–0	–	Won (6–4, 6–4) at 2009 Miami
(Thailand) Paradorn Srichaphan	2005	1	1–0	100%	1–0	–	–	–	Won (6–7^{(3–7)}, 7–5, 6–2) at 2005 Bangkok
(Spain) Nicolás Almagro	2008–17	6	5–1	83%	3–0	1–1	1–0	–	Won (7–6^{(7–4)}, 7–5) at 2017 Doha
(Italy) **Fabio Fognini**	2007–23	9	4–5	44%	2–2	1–3	1–0	–	Lost (4–6, 6–4, 4–6) at 2023 Italian Open
(Spain) **Roberto Bautista Agut**	2014–23	7	3–4	43%	1–4	1–0	1–0	–	Lost (1–6, 7–6^{(9–7)}, 3–6, 4–6) at 2023 Australian Open
(Australia) **Alex de Minaur**	2019–23	6	0–6	0%	0–4	0–1	0–1	–	Lost (6–7^{(5–7)}, 6–4, 5–7) at 2023 Paris
Number 10 ranked players
(Latvia) **Ernests Gulbis**	2008–13	6	5–1	83%	3–1	–	2–0	–	Lost (4–6, 3–6) at 2013 Canada
(France) **Lucas Pouille**	2016–18	5	4–1	80%	3–1	1–0	–	–	Lost (1–6, 6–1, 4–6) at 2018 Cincinnati
(Argentina) Juan Mónaco	2009–16	7	5–2	71%	5–1	0–1	–	–	Won (6–3, 6–2) at 2016 Cincinnati
(United States) **Frances Tiafoe**	2020–21	3	2–1	67%	2–1	–	–	–	Won (7–6^{(7–2)}, 6–7^{(7–9)}, 7–6^{(10–8)}) at 2021 Antwerp
(Canada) **Denis Shapovalov**	2021–24	3	2–1	67%	1–0	1–0	0–1	–	Won (4–6, 7–6^{(7–5)}, 6–3) at 2024 Dubai
(France) Arnaud Clément	2005–09	3	1–2	33%	1–2	–	–	–	Won (6–2, 6–3) at 2009 Dubai
Total	2005–24	526	327–199	62%	227–139 (62%)	43–39 (52%)	53–19 (74%)	4–2 (67%)	Statistics correct as of 2 August 2024.

=== Record against players ranked No. 11–20 ===
Active players are in boldface.

- (Spain) Feliciano López 11–0
- (Serbia) Viktor Troicki 8–0
- (Italy) Andreas Seppi 8–1
- (United States) Sam Querrey 8–2
- (Croatia) Ivo Karlović 7–0
- (Argentina) Juan Ignacio Chela 7–1
- (Spain) Marcel Granollers 7–1
- (France) Paul-Henri Mathieu 6–0
- (Australia) **Nick Kyrgios** 6–1
- (Finland) Jarkko Nieminen 5–0
- (Australia) **Bernard Tomic** 5–0
- (Russia) Dmitry Tursunov 5–0
- (Germany) Philipp Kohlschreiber 5–1
- (Ukraine) Alexandr Dolgopolov 4–0
- (Belgium) Xavier Malisse 4–0
- (Poland) Jerzy Janowicz 4–1
- (Georgia (country)) **Nikoloz Basilashvili** 3–0
- (Uruguay) Pablo Cuevas 3–0
- (United States) Robby Ginepri 3–0
- (France) **Adrian Mannarino** 3–0
- (Belarus) Max Mirnyi 3–0
- (United Kingdom) **Kyle Edmund** 3–1
- (Germany) Florian Mayer 3–1
- (France) **Benoît Paire** 3–1
- (Romania) Andrei Pavel 2–0
- (France) Fabrice Santoro 2–0
- (France) **Ugo Humbert** 2–1
- (Croatia) **Borna Ćorić** 2–2
- (Argentina) José Acasuso 1–0
- (Argentina) **Francisco Cerúndolo** 1–0
- (Austria) Stefan Koubek 1–0
- (United States) **Reilly Opelka** 1–0
- (Argentina) **Guido Pella** 1–0
- (Spain) **Albert Ramos Viñolas** 1–1
- (Slovakia) Dominik Hrbatý 0–1
- (United States) **Tommy Paul** 0–1
- (Russia) **Aslan Karatsev** 0–2

*As of 2 August 2024

== Wins against top 10 players ==
Murray has a 105–96 record against players who were, at the time the match was played, ranked in the top 10. Murray has 12 wins over No. 1-ranked players, beating Djokovic 5 times, Federer 4 times and Nadal 3 times.

Season	2005	2006	2007	2008	2009	2010	2011	2012	2013	2014	2015	2016	2017	2018	2019	2020	2021	2022	2023	2024	Total
Wins	0	4	5	12	14	7	7	12	5	5	12	16	2	0	0	1	2	1	0	0	105

#	Player	Rk	Event	Surface	Rd	Score	Rk	Ref
2006
1.	(United States) Andy Roddick	3	Pacific Coast Championships, US	Hard (i)	SF	7–5, 7–5	60	
2.	(United States) Andy Roddick	5	Wimbledon, UK	Grass	3R	7–6^{(7–4)}, 6–4, 6–4	44	
3.	(Switzerland) Roger Federer	1	Cincinnati Open, United States	Hard	2R	7–5, 6–4	21	
4.	(Croatia) Ivan Ljubičić	3	Madrid Open, Spain	Hard (i)	2R	6–4, 3–6, 6–3	19	
2007
5.	(Russia) Nikolay Davydenko	3	Qatar Open, Qatar	Hard	SF	7–5, 6–2	17	
6.	(United States) Andy Roddick	4	Pacific Coast Championships, US	Hard (i)	SF	7–6^{(10–8)}, 6–4	13	
7.	(Russia) Nikolay Davydenko	4	Indian Wells Open, United States	Hard	4R	7–6^{(7–3)}, 6–4	14	
8.	(Germany) Tommy Haas	9	Indian Wells Open, United States	Hard	QF	3–6, 6–3, 7–6^{(10–8)}	14	
9.	(United States) Andy Roddick	3	Miami Open, United States	Hard	QF	5–3, ret.	12	
2008
10.	(Russia) Nikolay Davydenko	4	Qatar Open, Qatar	Hard	SF	6–4, 6–3	11	
11.	(Switzerland) Roger Federer	1	Dubai Tennis Championships, UAE	Hard	1R	6–7^{(6–8)}, 6–3, 6–4	11	
12.	(France) Richard Gasquet	10	Wimbledon, UK	Grass	4R	5–7, 3–6, 7–6^{(7–3)}, 6–2, 6–4	11	
13.	(Switzerland) Stan Wawrinka	10	Canadian Open, Canada	Hard	3R	6–2, 0–6, 6–4	9	
14.	(Serbia) Novak Djokovic	3	Canadian Open, Canada	Hard	QF	6–3, 7–6^{(7–3)}	9	
15.	(Serbia) Novak Djokovic	3	Cincinnati Open, United States	Hard	F	7–6^{(7–4)}, 7–6^{(7–5)}	9	
16.	(Switzerland) Stan Wawrinka	10	US Open, United States	Hard	4R	6–1, 6–3, 6–3	6	
17.	(Spain) Rafael Nadal	1	US Open, United States	Hard	SF	6–2, 7–6^{(7–5)}, 4–6, 6–4	6	
18.	(Switzerland) Roger Federer	2	Madrid Open, Spain	Hard (i)	SF	3–6, 6–3, 7–5	4	
19.	(United States) Andy Roddick	6	Tennis Masters Cup, China	Hard (i)	RR	6–4, 1–6, 6–1	4	
20.	(France) Gilles Simon	9	Tennis Masters Cup, China	Hard (i)	RR	6–4, 6–2	4	
21.	(Switzerland) Roger Federer	2	Tennis Masters Cup, China	Hard (i)	RR	4–6, 7–6^{(7–3)}, 7–5	4	
2009
22.	(Switzerland) Roger Federer	2	Qatar Open, Qatar	Hard	SF	6–7^{(6–8)}, 6–2, 6–2	4	
23.	(United States) Andy Roddick	8	Qatar Open, Qatar	Hard	F	6–4, 6–2	4	
24.	(Spain) Rafael Nadal	1	Rotterdam Open, Netherlands	Hard (i)	F	6–3, 4–6, 6–0	4	
25.	(Switzerland) Roger Federer	2	Indian Wells Open, United States	Hard	SF	6–3, 4–6, 6–1	4	
26.	(Spain) Fernando Verdasco	9	Miami Open, United States	Hard	QF	6–1, 6–2	4	
27.	(Argentina) Juan Martín del Potro	7	Miami Open, United States	Hard	SF	6–1, 5–7, 6–2	4	
28.	(Serbia) Novak Djokovic	3	Miami Open, United States	Hard	F	6–2, 7–5	4	
29.	(Russia) Nikolay Davydenko	9	Monte-Carlo Masters, Monaco	Clay	QF	7–6^{(7–1)}, 6–1	4	
30.	(Russia) Nikolay Davydenko	8	Canadian Open, Canada	Hard	QF	6–2, 6–4	3	
31.	(France) Jo-Wilfried Tsonga	7	Canadian Open, Canada	Hard	SF	6–4, 7–6^{(8–6)}	3	
32.	(Argentina) Juan Martín del Potro	6	Canadian Open, Canada	Hard	F	6–7^{(4–7)}, 7–6^{(7–3)}, 6–1	3	
33.	(Spain) Fernando Verdasco	8	Valencia Open, Spain	Hard (i)	SF	6–3, 2–6, 6–3	4	
34.	(Argentina) Juan Martín del Potro	5	World Tour Finals, UK	Hard (i)	RR	6–3, 3–6, 6–2	4	
35.	(Spain) Fernando Verdasco	8	World Tour Finals, UK	Hard (i)	RR	6–4, 6–7^{(4–7)}, 7–6^{(7–3)}	4	
2010
36.	(Spain) Rafael Nadal	2	Australian Open, Australia	Hard	QF	6–3, 7–6^{(7–2)}, 3–0, ret.	4	
37.	(France) Jo-Wilfried Tsonga	10	Wimbledon, UK	Grass	QF	6–7^{(5–7)}, 7–6^{(7–5)}, 6–2, 6–2	4	
38.	(Spain) Rafael Nadal	1	Canadian Open, Canada	Hard	SF	6–3, 6–4	4	
39.	(Switzerland) Roger Federer	3	Canadian Open, Canada	Hard	F	7–5, 7–5	4	
40.	(Switzerland) Roger Federer	3	Shanghai, China	Hard	F	6–3, 6–2	4	
41.	(Sweden) Robin Söderling	4	World Tour Finals, UK	Hard (i)	RR	6–2, 6–4	5	
42.	(Spain) David Ferrer	7	World Tour Finals, UK	Hard (i)	RR	6–2, 6–2	5	
2011
43.	(Spain) David Ferrer	7	Australian Open, Australia	Hard	SF	4–6, 7–6^{(7–2)}, 6–1, 7–6^{(7–2)}	5	
44.	(United States) Andy Roddick	10	Queens Club Championships, UK	Grass	SF	6–3, 6–1	4	
45.	(United States) Mardy Fish	7	Cincinnati Open, United States	Hard	SF	6–3, 7–6^{(8–6)}	4	
46.	(Serbia) Novak Djokovic	1	Cincinnati Open, United States	Hard	F	6–4, 3–0, ret.	4	
47.	(Spain) David Ferrer	5	Japan Open, Japan	Hard	SF	6–2, 6–3	4	
48.	(Spain) Rafael Nadal	2	Japan Open, Japan	Hard	F	3–6, 6–2, 6–0	4	
49.	(Spain) David Ferrer	5	Shanghai Masters, China	Hard	F	7–5, 6–4	4	
2012
50.	(Czech Republic) Tomáš Berdych	7	Dubai Tennis Championships, UAE	Hard	QF	6–3, 7–5	4	
51.	(Serbia) Novak Djokovic	1	Dubai Tennis Championships, UAE	Hard	SF	6–2, 7–5	4	
52.	(Serbia) Janko Tipsarević	9	Miami Open, United States	Hard	QF	4–6, 6–3, 6–4	4	
53.	(Spain) David Ferrer	5	Wimbledon, UK	Grass	QF	6–7^{(5–7)}, 7–6^{(8–6)}, 6–4, 7–6^{(7–4)}	4	
54.	(France) Jo-Wilfried Tsonga	6	Wimbledon, UK	Grass	SF	6–3, 6–4, 3–6, 7–5	4	
55.	(Serbia) Novak Djokovic	2	Olympics, UK	Grass	SF	7–5, 7–5	4	
56.	(Switzerland) Roger Federer	1	Olympics, UK	Grass	F	6–2, 6–1, 6–4	4	
57.	(Czech Republic) Tomáš Berdych	7	US Open, United States	Hard	SF	5–7, 6–2, 6–1, 7–6^{(9–7)}	4	
58.	(Serbia) Novak Djokovic	2	US Open, United States	Hard	F	7–6^{(12–10)}, 7–5, 2–6, 3–6, 6–2	4	
59.	(Switzerland) Roger Federer	1	Shanghai Masters, China	Hard	SF	6–4, 6–4	3	
60.	(Czech Republic) Tomáš Berdych	6	World Tour Finals, UK	Hard (i)	RR	3–6, 6–3, 6–4	3	
61.	(France) Jo-Wilfried Tsonga	8	World Tour Finals, UK	Hard (i)	RR	6–2, 7–6^{(7–3)}	3	
2013
62.	(Switzerland) Roger Federer	2	Australian Open, Australia	Hard	SF	6–4, 6–7^{(5–7)}, 6–3, 6–7^{(2–7)}, 6–2	3	
63.	(France) Richard Gasquet	10	Miami Open, United States	Hard	SF	6–7^{(3–7)}, 6–1, 6–2	3	
64.	(Spain) David Ferrer	5	Miami Open, United States	Hard	F	2–6, 6–4, 7–6^{(7–1)}	3	
65.	(France) Jo-Wilfried Tsonga	7	Queen's Club Championships, UK	Grass	SF	4–6, 6–3, 6–2	2	
66.	(Serbia) Novak Djokovic	1	Wimbledon, UK	Grass	F	6–4, 7–5, 6–4	2	
2014
67.	(France) Jo-Wilfried Tsonga	10	US Open, United States	Hard	4R	7–5, 7–5, 6–4	9	
68.	(Croatia) Marin Čilić	9	China Open, China	Hard	QF	6–1, 6–4	11	
69.	(Spain) David Ferrer	5	Vienna Open, Austria	Hard (i)	F	5–7, 6–2, 7–5	11	
70.	(Spain) David Ferrer	5	Valencia Open, Spain	Hard (i)	SF	6–4, 7–5	10	
71.	(Canada) Milos Raonic	8	World Tour Finals, UK	Hard (i)	RR	6–3, 7–5	6	
2015
72.	(Czech Republic) Tomáš Berdych	7	Australian Open, Australia	Hard	SF	6–7^{(6–8)}, 6–0, 6–3, 7–5	6	
73.	(Czech Republic) Tomáš Berdych	9	Miami Open, United States	Hard	SF	6–4, 6–4	4	
74.	(Canada) Milos Raonic	6	Madrid Open, Spain	Clay	QF	6–4, 7–5	3	
75.	(Japan) Kei Nishikori	5	Madrid Open, Spain	Clay	SF	6–3, 6–4	3	
76.	(Spain) Rafael Nadal	4	Madrid Open, Spain	Clay	F	6–3, 6–2	3	
77.	(Spain) David Ferrer	8	French Open, France	Clay	QF	7–6^{(7–4)}, 6–2, 5–7, 6–1	3	
78.	(Japan) Kei Nishikori	4	Canadian Open, Canada	Hard	SF	6–3, 6–0	3	
79.	(Serbia) Novak Djokovic	1	Canadian Open, Canada	Hard	F	6–4, 4–6, 6–3	3	
80.	(Czech Republic) Tomáš Berdych	5	Shanghai Masters, China	Hard	QF	6–1, 6–3	2	
81.	(France) Richard Gasquet	9	Paris Masters, France	Hard (i)	QF	7–6^{(9–7)}, 3–6, 6–3	3	
82.	(Spain) David Ferrer	8	Paris Masters, France	Hard (i)	SF	6–4, 6–3	3	
83.	(Spain) David Ferrer	7	World Tour Finals, UK	Hard (i)	RR	6–4, 6–4	2	
2016
84.	(Spain) David Ferrer	8	Australian Open, Australia	Hard	QF	6–3, 6–7^{(5–7)}, 6–2, 6–3	2	
85.	(Japan) Kei Nishikori	6	Davis Cup, Great Britain	Hard (i)	1R	7–5, 7–6^{(8–6)}, 3–6, 4–6, 6–3	2	
86.	(Czech Republic) Tomáš Berdych	8	Madrid Open, Spain	Clay	QF	6–3, 6–2	2	
87.	(Spain) Rafael Nadal	5	Madrid Open, Spain	Clay	SF	7–5, 6–4	2	
88.	(Serbia) Novak Djokovic	1	Italian Open, Italy	Clay	F	6–3, 6–3	3	
89.	(Switzerland) Stan Wawrinka	4	French Open, France	Clay	SF	6–4, 6–2, 4–6, 6–2	2	
90.	(Canada) Milos Raonic	9	Queen's Club Championships, UK	Grass	F	6–7^{(5–7)}, 6–4, 6–3	2	
91.	(Czech Republic) Tomáš Berdych	9	Wimbledon, UK	Grass	SF	6–3, 6–3, 6–3	2	
92.	(Canada) Milos Raonic	7	Wimbledon, UK	Grass	F	6–4, 7–6^{(7–3)}, 7–6^{(7–2)}	2	
93.	(Japan) Kei Nishikori	7	Olympics, Brazil	Hard	SF	6–1, 6–4	2	
94.	(Canada) Milos Raonic	6	Cincinnati Open, United States	Hard	SF	6–3, 6–3	2	
95.	(Croatia) Marin Čilić	7	World Tour Finals, UK	Hard (i)	RR	6–3, 6–2	1	
96.	(Japan) Kei Nishikori	5	World Tour Finals, UK	Hard (i)	RR	6–7^{(9–11)}, 6–4, 6–4	1	
97.	(Switzerland) Stan Wawrinka	3	World Tour Finals, UK	Hard (i)	RR	6–4, 6–2	1	
98.	(Canada) Milos Raonic	4	World Tour Finals, UK	Hard (i)	SF	5–7, 7–6^{(7–5)}, 7–6^{(11–9)}	1	
99.	(Serbia) Novak Djokovic	2	World Tour Finals, UK	Hard (i)	F	6–3, 6–4	1	
2017
100.	(Czech Republic) Tomáš Berdych	10	Qatar Open, Qatar	Hard	SF	6–3, 6–4	1	
101.	(Japan) Kei Nishikori	9	French Open, France	Clay	QF	2–6, 6–1, 7–6^{(7–0)}, 6–1	1	
2020
102.	(Germany) Alexander Zverev	7	Cincinnati Open, United States	Hard	2R	6–3, 3–6, 7–5	134	
2021
103.	(Poland) Hubert Hurkacz	10	Vienna Open, Austria	Hard (i)	1R	6–4, 6–7^{(6–8)}, 6–3	156	
104.	(Italy) Jannik Sinner	10	Stockholm Open, Sweden	Hard (i)	2R	7–6^{(7–4)}, 6–3	143	
2022
105.	(Greece) Stefanos Tsitsipas	5	Stuttgart Open, Germany	Grass	QF	7–6^{(7–4)}, 6–3	68	

- Key: (Rk) first use, opponent rank; (Rd) round; (Rk) 2nd use, player rank; (Ref) reference; (F) final; (SF) semifinal; (QF) quarterfinal; (#R) rounds 4, 3, 2, 1; (RR) round-robin stage; (Q#) qualifying rounds or stages (3), 2, 1.

== Career Grand Slam tournament seedings ==
The tournaments won by Murray are in boldface.

Year	Australian Open	French Open	Wimbledon	US Open
2005	did not play	did not play	wildcard	qualifier
2006	not seeded	not seeded	not seeded	17th
2007	15th	did not play	did not play	19th
2008	9th	10th	12th	6th
2009	4th	3rd	3rd	2nd
2010	5th	4th	4th	4th
2011	5th	4th	4th	4th
2012	4th	4th	4th	**3rd**
2013	3rd	did not play	**2nd**	3rd
2014	4th	7th	3rd	8th
2015	6th	3rd	3rd	3rd
2016	2nd	2nd	**2nd**	2nd
2017	1st	1st	1st	did not play
2018	did not play	did not play	did not play	protected ranking
2019	protected ranking	did not play	did not play	did not play
2020	did not play	not seeded	tournament cancelled*	not seeded
2021	did not play	did not play	wildcard	not seeded
2022	wildcard	did not play	not seeded	not seeded
2023	not seeded	did not play	not seeded	not seeded
2024	not seeded	not seeded	did not play	did not play

* Due to the COVID-19 pandemic, the 2020 Wimbledon Championships of the tournament was cancelled.

== ATP Tour career earnings ==
Year	Majors	ATP wins	Total wins	Earnings ($)	Money list rank
2003	0	0	0	$5,314	599
2004	0	0	0	$10,275	731
2005	0	0	0	$219,490	105
2006	0	1	1	$677,802	26
2007	0	2	2	$880,905	21
2008	0	5	5	$3,705,650	4
2009	0	6	6	$4,421,058	5
2010	0	2	2	$4,046,805	4
2011	0	5	5	$5,180,092	4
2012	1	2	3	$5,708,232	3
2013	1	3	4	$5,416,221	3
2014	0	3	3	$3,918,244	8
2015	0	4	4	$8,245,230	3
2016	1	8	9	$16,349,701	1
2017	0	1	1	$2,092,625	15
2018	0	0	0	$238,610	166
2019	0	1	1	$497,751	118
2020	0	0	0	$249,361	139
2021	0	0	0	$520,937	101
2022	0	0	0	$933,978	60
2023	0	0	0	$997,741	71
2024	0	0	0	$441,514	146
Career*	3	43	46	$64,687,542	4

== Olympics ==
Murray represented Great Britain at his maiden Olympics in Beijing 2008. He competed in the singles and doubles competitions. Despite being seeded sixth in the singles competition, he was eliminated in the first round by Chinese Taipei's Yen-hsun Lu. Along with his brother Jamie, he advanced to the second round of the doubles competition with a win over the Canadian pairing of Daniel Nestor and Frédéric Niemeyer. The Murray brothers were eliminated in the second round by France's Arnaud Clément and Michael Llodra. In February, Murray pulled out of the Davis Cup tie against Argentina, because of a knee injury, so Argentina thrashed the under-strength British team. Jamie Murray scathingly criticised Andy and they did not speak to each other for a fortnight. Their rift continued in the Olympic doubles, over a perceived lack of effort from Andy.

At the London 2012 Olympics, Murray competed in the singles, doubles (partnering his brother Jamie) and mixed doubles (partnering Laura Robson). In the singles, he won the gold medal, including straight-set victories over Novak Djokovic in the semifinals and Roger Federer in the final, four weeks after Federer had beaten him in on the same court in the Wimbledon final. He also won the silver medal in the mixed doubles, losing to the Belarusian pairing of Max Mirnyi and Victoria Azarenka.

Murray was the Great Britain flag bearer during the opening ceremony for the 2016 Summer Olympics. He reached the gold medal match in the singles competition, whilst losing in the first and second rounds of the men's doubles and mixed doubles competitions respectively. After a 4-hour final, Murray defeated Juan Martín del Potro and successfully retained his title as Olympic champion, achieving a second Olympic gold medal – a feat which no other male singles player has achieved. Murray attributed the motivation of his win as coming from Mo Farah's 10,000 m win.

=== Participations (21–8) ===
Matches by tournament 2008 Beijing Olympics (1–2) 2012 London Olympics (9–2) 2016 Rio de Janeiro Olympics (7–2) 2020 Tokyo Olympics (2–1) 2024 Paris Olympics (2–1)	Matches by medal finals Gold medal final (2–1)	Matches by type Singles (12–1) Doubles (5–5) MIxed doubles (4–2)	Matches by surface Hard (10–5) Clay (2–1) Grass (9–2)

Venue	Surface	Match type	Round	Opponent player(s)	W/L	Match score
2008
Beijing	Hard	Singles	1R	(Chinese Taipei) Lu Yen-hsun	Loss	6–7^{(5–7)}, 4–6
Beijing	Hard	Doubles (w/ J Murray)	1R	(Canada) D Nestor / F Niemeyer	Win	4–6, 6–3, 6–4
Beijing	Hard	Doubles (w/ J Murray)	2R	(France) A Clément / M Llodra	Loss	1–6, 3–6
2012
London	Grass	Singles	1R	(Switzerland) Stan Wawrinka	Win	6–3, 6–3
London	Grass	Singles	2R	(Finland) Jarkko Nieminen	Win	6–2, 6–4
London	Grass	Singles	3R	(Cyprus) Marcos Baghdatis	Win	4–6, 6–1, 6–4
London	Grass	Singles	QF	(Spain) Nicolás Almagro	Win	6–4, 6–1
London	Grass	Singles	SF	(Serbia) Novak Djokovic	Win	7–5, 7–5
London	Grass	Singles	G	(Switzerland) Roger Federer	Win	6–2, 6–1, 6–4
London	Grass	Doubles (w/ J Murray)	1R	(Austria) J Melzer / A Peya	Loss	7–5, 6–7^{(6–8)}, 5–7
London	Grass	Mixed doubles (w/ L Robson)	1R	(Czech Republic) L Hradecká / R Štěpánek	Win	7–5, 6–7^{(7–9)}, [10–7]
London	Grass	Mixed doubles (w/ L Robson)	QF	(Australia) S Stosur / L Hewitt	Win	6–3, 3–6, [10–8]
London	Grass	Mixed doubles (w/ L Robson)	SF	(Germany) S Lisicki / C Kas	Win	6–1, 6–7^{(7–9)}, [10–7]
London	Grass	Mixed doubles (w/ L Robson)	F	(Belarus) V Azarenka / M Mirnyi	Loss	6–2, 3–6, [8–10]
2016
Rio de Janeiro	Hard	Singles	1R	(Serbia) Viktor Troicki	Win	6–3, 6–2
Rio de Janeiro	Hard	Singles	2R	(Argentina) Juan Mónaco	Win	6–3, 6–1
Rio de Janeiro	Hard	Singles	3R	(Italy) Fabio Fognini	Win	6–1, 2–6, 6–3
Rio de Janeiro	Hard	Singles	QF	(United States) Steve Johnson	Win	6–0, 4–6, 7–6^{(7–2)}
Rio de Janeiro	Hard	Singles	SF	(Japan) Kei Nishikori	Win	6–1, 6–4
Rio de Janeiro	Hard	Singles	G	(Argentina) Juan Martín del Potro	Win	7–5, 4–6, 6–2, 7–5
Rio de Janeiro	Hard	Doubles (w/ J Murray)	1R	(Brazil) T Bellucci / A Sá	Loss	6–7^{(6–8)}, 6–7^{(14–16)}
Rio de Janeiro	Hard	Mixed doubles (w/ H Watson)	1R	(Spain) C Suárez Navarro / D Ferrer	Win	6–3, 6–3
Rio de Janeiro	Hard	Mixed doubles (w/ H Watson)	QF	(India) S Mirza / R Bopanna	Loss	4–6, 4–6
2020
Tokyo	Hard	Doubles (w/ J Salisbury)	1R	(France) P-H Herbert / N Mahut	Win	6–3, 6–2
Tokyo	Hard	Doubles (w/ J Salisbury)	2R	(Germany) K Krawietz / T Pütz	Win	6–2, 7–6^{(7–2)}
Tokyo	Hard	Doubles (w/ J Salisbury)	QF	(Croatia) M Čilić / I Dodig	Loss	6–4, 6–7^{(2–7)}, [7–10]
2024
Paris	Clay	Doubles (w/ D Evans)	1R	(Japan) T Daniel / K Nishikori	Win	2–6, 7–6^{(7–5)}, [11–9]
Paris	Clay	Doubles (w/ D Evans)	2R	(Belgium) S Gillé / J Vliegen	Win	6–3, 6–7^{(8–10)}, [11–9]
Paris	Clay	Doubles (w/ D Evans)	QF	(United States) T Fritz / T Paul	Loss	2–6, 4–6

== Davis Cup ==
=== Year by year ===
==== 2005 ====
Murray made his Davis Cup debut for Great Britain in the Europe/Africa Zone Group 1 2nd Round against Israel in 2005 at 17 years of age, the youngest ever player for Great Britain. He teamed up with fellow debutant David Sherwood and came out victorious in the crucial doubles rubber against the experienced Jonathan Erlich and Andy Ram, helping Britain advance 3–2.

In September, Murray played his debut singles match for the Davis Cup in the World Group Play-off against Switzerland in Geneva on clay with Greg Rusedski, Alan Mackin and David Sherwood. Captain Jeremy Bates surprised everyone by naming Murray as the British No 1 and Alan Mackin as British No 2. Under the Davis Cup rules, this meant that for Friday's singles, Murray played the Swiss No 2, Stan Wawrinka while Mackin played the Swiss No 1, Roger Federer. Bates opted for this line-up believed that Federer was virtually unbeatable because he was on a winning streak and hadn't lost since June, and consequently Britain gambled on beating Wawrinka twice, with Murray playing Wawrinka on Friday when he was freshest. Under the rules for the Sunday reverse singles, he would have been able to substitute Mackin with Greg Rusedski, so that Rusedski would play Wawrinka, while Murray played Federer. However Great Britain lost both of their Friday rubbers, giving Switzerland a 2–0 lead. In the doubles, Murray/Rusedski played Federer and Yves Allegro. The British tactics came to nought as Switzerland won the doubles rubber as well, gaining an unassailable 3–0 lead after two days. Alan Mackin and David Sherwood were consequently nominated for the dead singles rubbers losing both of them, resulting in a clean sweep for Switzerland.

==== 2006 ====
For the Europe/Africa Zone Group I tie against Serbia and Montenegro, Murray had been suffering with a bacterial infection, so he was restricted to playing the doubles alongside Greg Rusedski, which they lost. With Arvind Parmar also losing in the singles, Great Britain were beaten 3–2.

In the same week as the relegation 1st round play-off against Israel, Murray was officially entered for the ATP tournament in Indianapolis, sparking fears about his commitment. There was a controversial move by the Lawn Tennis Association to pay £500,000 towards the cost of Murray's next coach, Brad Gilbert as a way of securing Murray's long-term services for the Davis Cup team. In the event, Murray played, winning his first singles. However he lost the doubles with Jamie Delgado, during which Murray damaged his shoulder and neck. He was diagnosed with whiplash, causing him to sit out the final day's singles, and eventually Great Britain were beaten 3–2 to proceed to the relegation 2nd round play-off against Ukraine. With Murray and Greg Rusedski playing, Great Britain beat Ukraine 3–2, to stay in Group I.

==== 2007 ====
In the tie against the Netherlands, Murray and Tim Henman won the opening singles, then Jamie Murray and Greg Rusedski won the doubles to secure victory. Rusedski announced his retirement on the doubles court.

In the run up to World Group play-off against Croatia, Tim Henman had announced he would retire after this match. Murray said "I'm not going to want to let the team down or let Tim down, I'd feel terrible if I was the one that was responsible for losing Tim's last tie. This means a lot to me and it's definitely going to be the biggest Davis Cup match of my career.". "Everyone is going to want to win for Tim. I'm hoping the way I play will show him what his career meant to my development and me." Great Britain beat Croatia 4–1 to qualify for the World Group in 2008.

After the retirement of Tim Henman and Greg Rusedski, the Davis Cup team was now dependent on Murray having to win three matches, though Henman had told him how wearing and time-consuming that can be. While the LTA was funding Brad Gilbert, Murray was obligated to play for his country, but in November, Murray finished with Brad Gilbert as his coach.

==== 2008 ====
Murray skipped the World Group 1st round tie against Argentina, over fears he could exacerbate a knee injury, leaving the British team in a hopeless situation – they lost 4–1. Jamie was furious that Andy was letting them down and the Murrays would not speak to each other for two weeks. Seven months later, as the brothers prepared for the tie against Austria, Andy declared that he had healed the rift with Jamie. When Jamie Murray and Ross Hutchins were beaten in the doubles, John Lloyd suffered criticism for not playing Andy. Great Britain lost their World Group play-off to Austria 3–2 and were relegated to Europe/Africa Zone Group I.

==== 2009 ====
Murray withdrew from the tie against Ukraine after failing to shake off a virus, and Great Britain lost 4–1.

Murray suffered an injury to his left wrist at the US Open, and would have rested if his next event had not been the Davis Cup. At the Poland match, he won both his singles rubbers. For the doubles with Ross Hutchins, Murray began in the right-hand court, the side usually occupied by the less dominant partner, so as to afford more protection to his troublesome left wrist than when striking double-handed backhands from the left court., though allowed his partner to resume his usual role in the second set. However, the pair succumbed to the world-class Polish duo, and Poland won 3–2;Great Britain were relegated to Europe/Africa Zone Group II for the first time since 1996. Murray had aggravated his wrist injury, so couldn't play for another six weeks.

==== 2010 ====
Murray pulled out of the match against Lithuania, so younger players could gain more international experience, and to allow him to focus on trying to win Grand Slam titles. His absence was criticised by Davis Cup captain John Lloyd. The Lithuanian side entered the tie as underdogs; fielding a team of teenagers, but Lithuania won 3–2. This was the first time that Great Britain had lost five ties in a row and was described as a humiliating Davis Cup defeat for Great Britain. It led to the resignation of John Lloyd as Davis Cup captain, with Britain now threatened with relegation to the lowest tier of the competition.

==== 2011 ====
Murray returned for the Europe/Africa Zone Group II tie versus Luxembourg. He beat Laurent Bram, a tennis coach, 6–0, 6–0, 6–0, the last time a Briton had achieved this score line in Davis Cup was Alan Mills defeating Josef Offenheim in 1959, also against Luxembourg. Andy and Jamie Murray teamed up for the first time in Davis Cup doubles for a straight sets win. In his second singles match, Andy then recorded a third straight sets victory, over No. 81 Gilles Müller, with Great Britain eventually winning 4–1.

Three of Hungary's top four players were not available for the Great Britain vs Hungary tie, so Murray defeated Sebő Kiss, a law student without a ranking, in his first singles rubber. Earlier, James Ward overcame sickness to beat the Hungarian No 1, then Colin Fleming and Ross Hutchins won the doubles, and Great Britain was promoted into Europe/Africa Zone Group I for the first time since 2009.

Afterwards, Murray criticised the tournament schedule and cast doubt on his availability for next year's Davis Cup.

==== 2012 ====
Murray intended to play in the Europe/Africa Zone Group I tie against Slovakia, but was prevented by injury concerns after the Australian Open. In any event, Great Britain won 3–2.

==== 2013 ====
By 2013, Great Britain's other tennis players had earned the team a chance to return to the World Group. Murray was suffering a vulnerable back and intended to have surgery after the US Open. Murray revealed that the fear of being branded "unpatriotic" led him to delay the surgery until after the Davis Cup tie in Croatia in September, which jeopardised his place in the next Australian Open. With Croatia's No 1 Marin Čilić absent for committing a doping offence, Murray won both his singles matches and the doubles with Colin Fleming, Great Britain eventually winning 4–1, for their first victory on clay since Ukraine in 2006, and returning to the World Group for the first time since 2008.

==== 2014 ====
At the World Group first round tie against the United States in San Diego, Murray defeated Donald Young and James Ward unexpectedly beat Sam Querrey on the first day. On the last day, Murray beat Sam Querrey to put Great Britain into the quarterfinals of the Davis Cup for the first time since 1986. Britain's only previous victory on American soil was 111 years ago.

Murray had to recover from a virus to play in the Quarter Final tie against Italy in Naples after missing the Thursday draw ceremony. James Ward lost his rain delayed match, while Murray's match against Andreas Seppi was halted on Friday evening due to fading light with the score at one set and 5–5 to Murray. On Saturday morning, Murray finished his match, winning in three sets. Two hours later, Murray partnered Colin Fleming to win the doubles rubber. Murray had only beaten one top ten player on clay, Nikolay Davydenko, back in 2009, and was upset by No. 13 Fabio Fognini in straight sets, which took Great Britain to the deciding final rubber. However, James Ward was defeated by Andreas Seppi, also in straight sets, knocking Great Britain out of the Davis Cup.

==== 2015 ====
Murray helped lead Great Britain to the final of the World Group for the first time since 1978, winning both his singles rubbers in the matches against the US, France and Australia.

In the final against Belgium in Ghent, Murray beat Ruben Bemelmans and combined with brother Jamie to win the doubles rubber before defeating David Goffin to win the Davis Cup for Great Britain, 79 years after the national team's last win.

==== 2016 ====
Murray led Britain against Japan in the first World Group match in Birmingham, before sitting out the quarter final in Belgrade against Serbia which fell just after Wimbledon. He returned for the semifinal against Argentina, where Great Britain lost.

==== 2019 ====
In his only match in this year's Davis Cup, Murray defeated the Netherlands' Tallon Griekspoor in the group stages against the Netherlands.

==== 2022 ====
Murray competed in two doubles matches and one singles match for Great Britain in this year's Davis Cup Finals. Partnered with Joe Salisbury, they lost to the United States' Rajeev Ram and Jack Sock, and the Netherlands' Wesley Koolhof and Matwé Middelkoop. Both matches were the deciding factor in each tie, which Great Britain lost 2–1. Great Britain therefore did not qualify for the quarterfinals. Murray then took part in his only singles match this year, against Kazakhstan, where he was victorious.

=== Participations (42–10) ===
Group membership World Group / Finals (23–4) WG play-off (7–2) Group I (7–4) Group II (5–0)	Matches by type Singles (33–3) Doubles (9–7)	Matches by surface Hard (22–4) Clay (12–4) Grass (8–1) Carpet (0–1)	Matches by venue Great Britain (26–6) Away (15–4) Neutral (1–0)

- ▲ ▼ indicates the outcome of the Davis Cup match followed by the score, date, place of event, the zonal classification and its phase, and the court surface.

Result	No.	Rbr	Match type (partner if any)	Opponent nation	Opponent player(s)	Score
▲3–2; 4–6 March 2005; Canada Stadium, Ramat Hasharon, Israel; Europe/Africa quarterfinal; hard surface
Win	1	III	Doubles (with David Sherwood)	Israel	Jonathan Erlich / Andy Ram	6–4, 7–6^{(7–5)}, 2–6, 7–6^{(7–5)}
▼0–5; 23–25 September 2005; Palexpo, Geneva, Switzerland; World Group play-off; clay(i) surface
Loss	2	II	Singles	Switzerland	Stan Wawrinka	3–6, 6–7^{(5–7)}, 4–6
Loss	3	III	Doubles (with Greg Rusedski)	Switzerland	Yves Allegro / Roger Federer	5–7, 6–2, 6–7^{(1–7)}, 2–6
▼2–3; 7–9 April 2006; Braehead Arena, Glasgow, Great Britain; Europe/Africa quarterfinal; carpet(i) surface
Loss	4	III	Doubles (with Greg Rusedski)	Serbia and Montenegro	Ilija Bozoljac / Nenad Zimonjić	3–6, 6–3, 3–6, 4–6
▼2–3; 21–23 July 2006; International Lawn Tennis Centre, Eastbourne, Great Britain; Europe/Africa relegation; grass surface
Win	5	II	Singles	Israel	Andy Ram	2–6, 4–6, 7–5, 6–2, 6–3
Loss	6	III	Doubles (with Jamie Delgado)	Israel	Jonathan Erlich \ Andy Ram	6–3, 3–6, 7–5, 3–6, 4–6
▲3–2; 22–24 September 2006; Lawn Tennis Club, Odesa, Ukraine; Europe/Africa relegation; clay surface
Win	7	II	Singles	Ukraine	Alexandr Dolgopolov	6–3, 6–4, 6–2
Loss	8	III	Doubles (with Jamie Delgado)	Ukraine	Sergiy Stakhovsky \ Orest Tereshchuk	3–6, 3–6, 3–6
Win	9	IV	Singles	Ukraine	Sergiy Stakhovsky	6–3, 6–2, 7–5
▲4–1; 6–8 April 2007; National Exhibition Centre, Birmingham, Great Britain; Europe/Africa quarterfinal; hard(i) surface
Win	10	I	Singles	Netherlands	Raemon Sluiter	6–3, 7–5, 6–2
▲4–1; 21–23 September 2007; All England Lawn Tennis and Croquet Club, London, Great Britain; World Group play-off; grass surface
Win	11	I	Singles	Croatia	Marin Čilić	3–6, 6–4, 6–2, 4–6, 6–3
Win	12	IV	Singles (dead rubber)	Croatia	Roko Karanušić	6–4, 7–6^{(7–4)}
▼2–3; 19–21 September 2008; All England Lawn Tennis and Croquet Club, London, Great Britain; World Group play-off; grass surface
Win	13	II	Singles	Austria	Alexander Peya	6–4, 6–1, 6–3
Win	14	IV	Singles	Austria	Jürgen Melzer	6–4, 5–7, 6–4, 6–1
▼2–3; 18–20 September 2009; Echo Arena, Liverpool, Great Britain; Europe/Africa quarterfinal; hard(i) surface
Win	15	I	Singles	Poland	Michał Przysiężny	6–4, 6–2, 6–4
Loss	16	III	Doubles (with Ross Hutchins)	Poland	Mariusz Fyrstenberg / Marcin Matkowski	5–7, 6–3, 3–6, 2–6
Win	17	IV	Singles	Poland	Jerzy Janowicz	6–3, 6–4, 6–3
▲4–1; 8–10 July 2011; Braehead Arena, Glasgow, Great Britain; Europe/Africa quarterfinal; hard(i) surface
Win	18	II	Singles	Luxembourg	Laurent Bram	6–0, 6–0, 6–0
Win	19	III	Doubles (with Jamie Murray)	Luxembourg	Laurent Bram / Mike Vermeer	7–5, 6–2, 6–0
Win	20	IV	Singles	Luxembourg	Gilles Müller	6–4, 6–3, 6–1
▲5–0; 16–18 September 2011; Braehead Arena, Glasgow, Great Britain; Europe/Africa Semifinal; hard(i) surface
Win	21	II	Singles	Hungary	Sebő Kiss	6–0, 6–2, 7–6^{(7–3)}
Win	22	IV	Singles (dead rubber)	Hungary	György Balázs	7–6^{(7–3)}, 6–3
▲4–1; 13–15 September 2013; Stadion Stella Maris, Umag, Croatia; World Group play-off; clay surface
Win	23	I	Singles	Croatia	Borna Ćorić	6–3, 6–0, 6–3
Win	24	III	Doubles (with Colin Fleming)	Croatia	Ivan Dodig / Mate Pavic	6–3, 6–2, 6–7^{(6–8)}, 6–1
Win	25	IV	Singles	Croatia	Ivan Dodig	6–4, 6–2, 6–4
▲3–1; 31 January – 2 February 2014; Petco Park, San Diego, United States; World Group first round; clay surface
Win	26	I	Singles	United States	Donald Young	6–1, 6–2, 6–3
Win	27	IV	Singles	United States	Sam Querrey	7–6^{(7–5)}, 6–7^{(3–7)}, 6–1, 6–3
▼2–3; 4–6 April 2014; Tennis Club Napoli, Naples, Italy; World Group quarterfinal; clay surface
Win	28	II	Singles	Italy	Andreas Seppi	6–4, 7–5, 6–3
Win	29	III	Doubles (with Colin Fleming)	Italy	Simone Bolelli / Fabio Fognini	6–3, 6–2, 3–6, 7–5
Loss	30	IV	Singles	Italy	Fabio Fognini	3–6, 3–6, 4–6
▲3–2; 6–8 March 2015; Emirates Arena, Glasgow, Great Britain; World Group first round; hard(i) surface
Win	31	I	Singles	United States	Donald Young	6–1, 6–1, 4–6, 6–2
Win	32	IV	Singles	United States	John Isner	7–6^{(7–4)}, 6–3, 7–6^{(7–4)}
▲3–1; 17–19 July 2015; Queen's Club, London, Great Britain; World Group quarterfinal; grass surface
Win	33	II	Singles	France	Jo-Wilfried Tsonga	7–5, 7–6^{(12–10)}, 6–2
Win	34	III	Doubles (with Jamie Murray)	France	Nicolas Mahut / Jo-Wilfried Tsonga	4–6, 6–3, 7–6^{(7–5)}, 6–1
Win	35	IV	Singles	France	Gilles Simon	4–6, 7–6^{(7–5)}, 6–3, 6–0
▲3–2; 18–20 September 2015; Emirates Arena, Glasgow, Great Britain; World Group semifinal; hard(i) surface
Win	36	II	Singles	Australia	Thanasi Kokkinakis	6–3, 6–0, 6–3
Win	37	III	Doubles (with Jamie Murray)	Australia	Sam Groth / Lleyton Hewitt	4–6, 6–3, 6–4, 6–7^{(6–8)}, 6–4
Win	38	IV	Singles	Australia	Bernard Tomic	7–5, 6–3, 6–2
▲3–1; 27–29 November 2015; Flanders Expo, Ghent, Belgium; World Group final; clay(i) surface
Win	39	II	Singles	Belgium	Ruben Bemelmans	6–3, 6–2, 7–5
Win	40	III	Doubles (with Jamie Murray)	Belgium	Steve Darcis / David Goffin	6–4, 4–6, 6–3, 6–2
Win	41	IV	Singles	Belgium	David Goffin	6–3, 7–5, 6–3
▲3–1; 4–6 March 2016; Barclaycard Arena, Birmingham, Great Britain; World Group first round; hard(i) surface
Win	42	I	Singles	Japan	Taro Daniel	6–1, 6–3, 6–1
Win	43	III	Doubles (with Jamie Murray)	Japan	Yoshihito Nishioka / Yasutaka Uchiyama	6–3, 6–2, 6–4
Win	44	IV	Singles	Japan	Kei Nishikori	7–5, 7–6^{(8–6)}, 3–6, 4–6, 6–3
▼2–3; 16–18 September 2016; Emirates Arena, Glasgow, Great Britain; World Group semifinal; hard(i) surface
Loss	45	I	Singles	Argentina	Juan Martín del Potro	4–6, 7–5, 7–6^{(7–5)}, 3–6, 4–6
Win	46	III	Doubles (with Jamie Murray)	Argentina	Juan Martín del Potro / Leonardo Mayer	6–1, 3–6, 6–4, 6–4
Win	47	IV	Singles	Argentina	Guido Pella	6–3, 6–2, 6–3
▲2–1; 20 November 2019; Caja Mágica, Madrid, Spain; Finals round robin; hard(i) surface
Win	48	I	Singles	Netherlands	Tallon Griekspoor	6–7^{(7–9)}, 6–4, 7–6^{(7–5)}
▼1–2; 14 September 2022; Emirates Arena, Glasgow; Great Britain; Finals round robin; hard(i) surface
Loss	49	III	Doubles (with Joe Salisbury)	United States	Rajeev Ram / Jack Sock	7–5, 4–6, 5–7
▼1–2; 16 September 2022; Emirates Arena, Glasgow; Great Britain; Finals round robin; hard(i) surface
Loss	50	III	Doubles (with Joe Salisbury)	Netherlands	Wesley Koolhof / Matwé Middelkoop	6–7^{(0–7)}, 7–6^{(8–6)}, 3–6
▲2–1; 18 September 2022; Emirates Arena, Glasgow; Great Britain; Finals round robin; hard(i) surface
Win	51	I	Singles	Kazakhstan	Dmitry Popko	6–4, 6–3
▲1–0; 15 September 2023; Manchester Arena, Manchester; Great Britain; Finals round robin; hard(i) surface
Win	52	I	Singles	Switzerland	Leandro Riedi	6–7^{(7–9)}, 6–4, 6–4

== Notable exhibitions ==
=== Singles finals: 4 (2 titles, 2 runner-up) ===
Result	Date	Tournament	Surface	Opponent	Score
Win	Jan 2009	World Tennis Championship, UAE	Hard	(Spain) Rafael Nadal	6–4, 5–7, 6–3
Loss	Mar 2014	BNP Paribas Showdown, US	Hard	(Serbia) Novak Djokovic	3–6, 6–7^{(2–7)}
Win	Jan 2015	World Tennis Championship, UAE	Hard	(Serbia) Novak Djokovic	Walkover
Loss	Dec 2021	World Tennis Championship, UAE	Hard	(Russia) Andrey Rublev	4–6, 6–7^{(2–7)}

=== Team competitions ===
Result	No.	Tournament	Surface	Team	Partners	Opponent team	Opponent players	Score
Win	May 2009	Masters Guinot-Mary Cohr, Paris, France	Clay	Team Guinot	(Russia) Marat Safin (C) (Switzerland) Roger Federer (France) Gaël Monfils (Spain) Rafael Nadal (Spain) Tommy Robredo	Team Mary Cohr	(United States) James Blake (C) (Switzerland) Stan Wawrinka (Cyprus) Marcos Baghdatis (France) Arnaud Clement (France) Fabrice Santoro (France) Paul-Henri Mathieu	4–2
Win	May 2010	Masters Guinot-Mary Cohr, Paris, France	Clay	Team Guinot	(France) Michael Llodra (C) (France) Jo-Wilfried Tsonga (Chile) Fernando Gonzalez (Germany) Rainer Schuttler (Russia) Mikhail Youzhny	Team Mary Cohr	(Spain) David Ferrer (C) (Switzerland) Roger Federer (United States) Andy Roddick (Switzerland) Stan Wawrinka (France) Sebastien Grosjean (United States) Mardy Fish	4–2
Win	Jan 2011	Rally for Relief 2, Melbourne, Australia	Hard	Team Green	(Australia) Patrick Rafter (C) (Belgium) Kim Clijsters (United States) Andy Roddick (Spain) Rafael Nadal (Belarus) Victoria Azarenka (Russia) Vera Zvonareva	Team Gold	(Australia) Lleyton Hewitt (C) (Australia) Samantha Stosur (Swap player) (Serbia) Novak Djokovic (Belgium) Justine Henin (Serbia) Ana Ivanovic (Denmark) Caroline Wozniacki (Switzerland) Roger Federer	44–43

== See also ==
- List of career achievements by Andy Murray
- Open Era tennis records – men's singles
- All-time tennis records - men's singles
- List of Grand Slam men's singles champions
- List of tennis title leaders in the Open Era
- List of male singles tennis players
- List of ATP number 1 ranked singles tennis players
- List of highest ranked tennis players per country
- List of flag bearers for Great Britain at the Olympics
- 2016 Summer Olympics national flag bearers
- Sport in Great Britain
- Big Four career statistics
