= 2008 SAP Open =

- Date: February 18–24
- Edition: 120th
- Category: International Series
- Draw: 32S / 16D
- Prize money: $411,000
- Surface: Hard / indoor
- Location: San Jose, California, U.S.
- Venue: HP Pavilion

Champions

Singles
- (United States) Andy Roddick

Doubles
- (United States) Scott Lipsky / (United States) David Martin
| ← 2007 · | Pacific Coast Championships | · 2009 → |

The 2008 SAP Open was a men's tennis tournament played on indoor hard courts. It was the 120th edition of the SAP Open, and was part of the International Series of the 2008 ATP Tour. It took place at the HP Pavilion in San Jose, California, United States, from February 18 through February 24, 2008.

The singles draw featured ATP No. 6 and 2007 Davis Cup champion Andy Roddick, Australian Open quarterfinalist and other 2007 Davis Cup champion James Blake, and 2007 US Open quarterfinalist Tommy Haas. Other seeds were Sydney semifinalist Radek Štěpánek, 2007 SAP Open quarterfinalist Hyung-taik Lee, Jürgen Melzer, Sam Querrey and Kristof Vliegen.

The event started off with an exhibition match between fourteen time Grand Slam champion Pete Sampras and Tommy Haas, replacing injured Marat Safin, scheduled to play the exhibition in the first place. The retired American legend defeated his opponent 6–4, 6–2.

== Finals ==
=== Singles ===
(United States) Andy Roddick defeated (Czech Republic) Radek Štěpánek, 6–4, 7–5

- It was Andy Roddick's 1st title of the year, and his 24th overall. It was his 3rd win at the event.

=== Doubles ===
(United States) Scott Lipsky / (United States) David Martin defeated (United States) Bob Bryan / (United States) Mike Bryan, 7–6^{(7–4)}, 7–5
