= 2006 SAP Open =

- Date: February 13–19
- Edition: 118th
- Category: International Series
- Draw: 32S / 16D
- Prize money: $355,000
- Surface: Hard / indoor
- Location: San Jose, U.S.
- Venue: HP Pavilion at San Jose

Champions

Singles
- (United Kingdom) Andy Murray

Doubles
- (Sweden) Jonas Björkman / (United States) John McEnroe
← 2005 ·	Pacific Coast Championships	· 2007 →

The 2006 SAP Open was a men's tennis tournament held at the HP Pavilion in San Jose, United States that was part of the International Series of the 2006 ATP Tour. It was the 118th edition of the tournament and was held from February 13 through February 19, 2006. Unseeded Andy Murray won the single title.

== Finals ==
=== Singles ===
(United Kingdom) Andy Murray defeated (Australia) Lleyton Hewitt 2–6, 6–1, 7–6^{(7–3)}

- It was Murray's only singles title of the year and the 1st of his career.

=== Doubles ===
(Sweden) Jonas Björkman / (United States) John McEnroe defeated (United States) Paul Goldstein / (United States) Jim Thomas 7–6^{(7–2)}, 4–6, [10–7]
