= 2008 SAP Open – Doubles =

Doubles
- 2008 SAP Open

Final
- Champions: (United States) Scott Lipsky (United States) David Martin
- Runners-up: (United States) Bob Bryan (United States) Mike Bryan
- Score: 7–6^{(7–4)}, 7–5

Details
- Draw: 16
- Seeds: 4

Events
| Singles | Doubles |
| ← 2007 · | Pacific Coast Championships | · 2009 → |

The 2008 SAP Open doubles was a men's tennis tournament played on indoor hard courts in San Jose, California in the United States.

Eric Butorac and Jamie Murray were the defending champions. They were both present but did not compete together.
Butorac partnered with Todd Perry, but lost in the first round to Sanchai Ratiwatana and Sonchat Ratiwatana.
Murray partnered with Max Mirnyi, but lost in the quarterfinals to Steve Darcis and Kristof Vliegen.

Scott Lipsky and David Martin won in the final 7–6^{(7–4)}, 7–5, against Bob Bryan and Mike Bryan.

== Seeds ==
1. (United States) Bob Bryan / (United States) Mike Bryan (final)
2. (India) Mahesh Bhupathi / (The Bahamas) Mark Knowles (quarterfinals)
3. (Belarus) Max Mirnyi / (United Kingdom) Jamie Murray (quarterfinals)
4. (United States) Eric Butorac / (Australia) Todd Perry (first round)

== Draw ==
=== Key ===
- Q = Qualifier
- WC = Wild card
- LL = Lucky loser
- Alt = Alternate
- SE = Special exempt
- PR = Protected ranking
- ITF = ITF entry
- JE = Junior exempt
- w/o = Walkover
- r = Retired
- d = Defaulted
- SR = Special ranking

=== Draw ===
First round
1 | (United States) B Bryan (United States) M Bryan | 6 | 7^{7}
(South Africa) C Haggard (United States) B Reynolds | 3 | 6^{4}
WC | (United States) J Isner (United States) D Young | 6 | 6
(United States) M Fish (Austria) J Melzer | 4 | 4
3 | (Belarus) M Mirnyi (United Kingdom) J Murray | 6 | 6
(India) R Bopanna (Pakistan) A-u-H Qureshi | 4 | 4
WC | (United States) JM Gambill (United States) S Warburg | 6 | 6^{8} | [7]
(Belgium) S Darcis (Belgium) K Vliegen | 2 | 7 | [10]
(United States) R Kendrick (United States) S Querrey | 6^{8} | 4
(Romania) V Hănescu (United Kingdom) R Hutchins | 7^{10} | 6
(Thailand) S Ratiwatana (Thailand) S Ratiwatana | 7^{7} | 6
4 | (United States) E Butorac (Australia) T Perry | 6^{4} | 4
(Russia) I Kunitsyn (United States) J Thomas | 6 | 3 | [10]
(United States) S Lipsky (United States) D Martin | 4 | 6 | [12]
(Czech Republic) J Levinský (Czech Republic) R Štěpánek | 2 | 3
2 | (India) M Bhupathi (The Bahamas) M Knowles | 6 | 6

Quarterfinals
1 | (United States) B Bryan (United States) M Bryan | 6 | 4 | [10]
WC | (United States) J Isner (United States) D Young | 3 | 6 | [5]
3 | (Belarus) M Mirnyi (United Kingdom) J Murray | 4 | 6 | [6]
(Belgium) S Darcis (Belgium) K Vliegen | 6 | 3 | [10]
(Romania) V Hănescu (United Kingdom) R Hutchins | 6^{9} | 5
(Thailand) S Ratiwatana (Thailand) S Ratiwatana | 7^{11} | 7
(United States) S Lipsky (United States) D Martin | 2 | 7^{7} | [10]
2 | (India) M Bhupathi (The Bahamas) M Knowles | 6 | 6^{5} | [8]

Semifinals
1 | (United States) B Bryan (United States) M Bryan | 6 | 7^{7}
(Belgium) S Darcis (Belgium) K Vliegen | 2 | 6^{2}
(Thailand) S Ratiwatana (Thailand) S Ratiwatana | 6^{3} | 3
(United States) S Lipsky (United States) D Martin | 7^{7} | 6

Final
1 | (United States) B Bryan (United States) M Bryan | 6^{4} | 5
(United States) S Lipsky (United States) D Martin | 7^{7} | 7
