= 2006 SAP Open – Doubles =

Doubles
- 2006 SAP Open

Final
- Champions: (United States) John McEnroe (Sweden) Jonas Björkman
- Runners-up: (United States) Paul Goldstein (United States) Jim Thomas
- Score: 7–6^{(7–2)}, 4–6, 10–7

Details
- Draw: 16
- Seeds: 4

Events
Singles	Doubles
← 2005 ·	Pacific Coast Championships	· 2007 →

John McEnroe and Jonas Björkman won in the final 7–6^{(7–2)}, 4–6, 10–7, against Paul Goldstein and Jim Thomas.

== Seeds ==
1. (Sweden) Simon Aspelin / (Australia) Todd Perry (semifinals)
2. (Australia) Wayne Arthurs / (Australia) Stephen Huss (first round)
3. (Australia) Jordan Kerr / (United States) Travis Parrott (quarterfinals)
4. (Czech Republic) Jaroslav Levinský / (Sweden) Robert Lindstedt (semifinals)

== Draw ==
=== Key ===
- Q = Qualifier
- WC = Wild card
- LL = Lucky loser
- Alt = Alternate
- SE = Special exempt
- PR = Protected ranking
- ITF = ITF entry
- JE = Junior exempt
- w/o = Walkover
- r = Retired
- d = Defaulted
- SR = Special ranking

=== Draw ===
First round
1	(Sweden) Simon Aspelin (Australia) Todd Perry	6	6
(United States) Luke Jensen (United States) Murphy Jensen	2	1
(United States) Scoville Jenkins (United States) Bobby Reynolds	2	4
(Croatia) Ivo Karlović (France) Cyril Saulnier	6	6
3	(Australia) Jordan Kerr (United States) Travis Parrott	6	6
(United States) Goran Dragicevic (United States) Mirko Pehar	2	2
(United States) Paul Goldstein (United States) Jim Thomas	6	4	10
(South Africa) Chris Haggard (Belgium) Kristof Vliegen	4	6	5
(South Africa) Jeff Coetzee (Netherlands) Rogier Wassen	4	4
(United Kingdom) James Auckland (United Kingdom) Andy Murray	6	6
(United States) Amer Delic (United States) Vincent Spadea	4	2
4	(Czech Republic) Jaroslav Levinský (Sweden) Robert Lindstedt	6	6
(Czech Republic) Lukáš Dlouhý (Czech Republic) Pavel Vízner	4	2
(Australia) Ashley Fisher (United States) Tripp Phillips	6	6
WC	(Sweden) Jonas Björkman (United States) John McEnroe	6	6
2	(Australia) Wayne Arthurs (Australia) Stephen Huss	3	3

Quarterfinals
1	(Sweden) Simon Aspelin (Australia) Todd Perry	3	7	10
(Croatia) Ivo Karlović (France) Cyril Saulnier	6	6^{6}	5
3	(Australia) Jordan Kerr (United States) Travis Parrott	6	4	10
(United States) Paul Goldstein (United States) Jim Thomas	4	6	12
(United Kingdom) James Auckland (United Kingdom) Andy Murray	4	3
4	(Czech Republic) Jaroslav Levinský (Sweden) Robert Lindstedt	6	6
(Australia) Ashley Fisher (United States) Tripp Phillips	1	5
WC	(Sweden) Jonas Björkman (United States) John McEnroe	6	7

Semifinals
1	(Sweden) Simon Aspelin (Australia) Todd Perry	3	7	3
(United States) Paul Goldstein (United States) Jim Thomas	6	6^{4}	10
4	(Czech Republic) Jaroslav Levinský (Sweden) Robert Lindstedt	3	6	8
WC	(Sweden) Jonas Björkman (United States) John McEnroe	6	4	10

Final
(United States) Paul Goldstein (United States) Jim Thomas	6^{2}	6	7
WC	(Sweden) Jonas Björkman (United States) John McEnroe	7	4	10
