= 2008 SAP Open – Singles =

Singles
- 2008 SAP Open

Final
- Champion: (United States) Andy Roddick
- Runner-up: (Czech Republic) Radek Štěpánek
- Score: 6–4, 7–5

Details
- Draw: 32 (4Q / 3WC)
- Seeds: 8

Events
Singles	Doubles
← 2007 ·	Pacific Coast Championships	· 2009 →

Andy Murray was the defending champion, but chose not to participate that year.

First-seeded Andy Roddick won in the final 6–4, 7–5, against Radek Štěpánek.

== Seeds ==
1. (United States) Andy Roddick (champion)
2. (United States) James Blake (quarterfinals)
3. (Germany) Tommy Haas (second round)
4. (Czech Republic) Radek Štěpánek (final)
5. (South Korea) Hyung-taik Lee (withdrew due to a back injury)
6. (Austria) Jürgen Melzer (first round)
7. (United States) Sam Querrey (first round)
8. (Belgium) Kristof Vliegen (second round)

== Draw ==
=== Key ===
- Q = Qualifier
- WC = Wild card
- LL = Lucky loser
- Alt = Alternate
- SE = Special exempt
- PR = Protected ranking
- ITF = ITF entry
- JE = Junior exempt
- w/o = Walkover
- r = Retired
- d = Defaulted
- SR = Special ranking

=== Finals ===
Semifinals
1	(United States) Andy Roddick	7	6
(Spain) Guillermo García López	6^{2}	1
4	(Czech Republic) Radek Štěpánek	6^{5}	6	6
WC	(United States) Robby Ginepri	7	4	1

Final
1	(United States) Andy Roddick	6	7
4	(Czech Republic) Radek Štěpánek	4	5

=== Top half ===
First round
1	(United States) A Roddick	6	6^{3}	7
LL	(Australia) C Guccione	3	7	6^{5}
SE	(Japan) K Nishikori	7	6
(Argentina) D Hartfield	5	3
(United States) M Fish	6	6
Q	(United States) T Smyczek	3	4
Q	(Germany) D Gremelmayr	5	7	6
7	(United States) S Querrey	7	6^{1}	3
3	(Germany) T Haas	6	4	6
(United States) R Kendrick	3	6	2
(France) F Serra	6^{5}	4
(United States) J Isner	7	6
(Germany) B Becker	6	3
(Brazil) M Daniel	1	0	r
(Spain) G García López	6	6^{5}	7
6	(Austria) J Melzer	2	7	6^{6}

Second round
1	(United States) A Roddick	6	6
SE	(Japan) K Nishikori	2	4
(United States) M Fish	6^{4}	6	6
Q	(Germany) D Gremelmayr	7	3	3
3	(Germany) T Haas	6	6^{6}	3
(United States) J Isner	4	7	6
(Germany) B Becker	6	6^{3}	4
(Spain) G García López	3	7	6

Quarterfinals
1	(United States) A Roddick	7	1	7
(United States) M Fish	6^{6}	6	5
(United States) J Isner	6^{4}	7	6^{11}
(Spain) G García López	7	6^{1}	7

Semifinals
1	(United States) A Roddick	7	6
(Spain) G García López	6^{2}	1

=== Bottom half ===
First round
LL	(United States) W Odesnik	6	5	6
(United States) D Young	1	7	4
WC	(Belarus) M Mirnyi	6^{4}	7	2
(Chinese Taipei) Y-h Lu	7	5	6
(United States) B Reynolds	7	6
Q	(Germany) B Dorsch	5	4
(Chile) P Capdeville	6^{2}	1
4	(Czech Republic) R Štěpánek	7	6
8	(Belgium) K Vliegen	6	7
(Romania) V Hănescu	4	6^{4}
LL	(United States) J Witten	2	7	4
WC	(United States) R Ginepri	6	5	6
(Belgium) S Darcis	3	6	4
WC	(United States) J Levine	6	2	6
Q	(United States) S Warburg	3	1
2	(United States) J Blake	6	6

Second round
LL	(United States) W Odesnik	4	4
(Chinese Taipei) Y-h Lu	6	6
(United States) B Reynolds	5	6^{5}
4	(Czech Republic) R Štěpánek	7	7
8	(Belgium) K Vliegen	2	3
WC	(United States) R Ginepri	6	6
WC	(United States) J Levine	3	4
2	(United States) J Blake	6	6

Quarterfinals
(Chinese Taipei) Y-h Lu	2	6^{5}
4	(Czech Republic) R Štěpánek	6	7
WC	(United States) R Ginepri	6	6
2	(United States) J Blake	2	2

Semifinals
4	(Czech Republic) R Štěpánek	6^{5}	6	6
WC	(United States) R Ginepri	7	4	1
