= 2007 SAP Open – Doubles =

Doubles
- 2007 SAP Open

Final
- Champions: (United States) Eric Butorac (United Kingdom) Jamie Murray
- Runners-up: (South Africa) Chris Haggard (Germany) Rainer Schüttler
- Score: 7–5, 7–6^{(8–6)}

Details
- Draw: 16
- Seeds: 4

Events
Singles	Doubles
← 2006 ·	Pacific Coast Championships	· 2008 →

Jonas Björkman and John McEnroe were the defending champions, but did not participate this year.

Eric Butorac and Jamie Murray won the title, defeating Chris Haggard and Rainer Schüttler 7–5, 7–6^{(8–6)} in the final.

== Seeds ==
1. (Czech Republic) František Čermák / (Czech Republic) Jaroslav Levinský (first round)
2. (Sweden) Simon Aspelin / (Sweden) Robert Lindstedt (first round)
3. (United States) Paul Goldstein / (United States) Jim Thomas (quarterfinals)
4. (South Africa) Chris Haggard / (Germany) Rainer Schüttler (final)

== Draw ==
=== Key ===
- Q = Qualifier
- WC = Wild card
- LL = Lucky loser
- Alt = Alternate
- SE = Special exempt
- PR = Protected ranking
- ITF = ITF entry
- JE = Junior exempt
- w/o = Walkover
- r = Retired
- d = Defaulted
- SR = Special ranking

=== Draw ===
First round
1	(Czech Republic) F Čermák (Czech Republic) J Levinský	6^{5}	1
(United Kingdom) J Auckland (Australia) S Huss	7^{7}	6
WC	(United States) S Lipsky (United States) D Martin	6	3	[11]
(South Korea) H-t Lee (Chinese Taipei) Y-h Lu	3	6	[9]
3	(United States) P Goldstein (United States) J Thomas	6	1	[10]
(United States) J Blake (United States) M Fish	3	6	[4]
(Denmark) K Pless (Thailand) D Udomchoke	3	4
(United States) E Butorac (United Kingdom) J Murray	6	6
(Australia) A Fisher (United States) T Parrott	4	6	[6]
(Russia) T Gabashvili (Russia) M Safin	6	4	[10]
(Germany) S Greul (Germany) B Phau	3	6^{3}
4	(South Africa) C Haggard (Germany) R Schüttler	6	7^{7}
WC	(United States) A Delić (United States) R Kendrick	6	6^{2}	[10]
(Australia) J Kerr (Australia) T Perry	3	7^{7}	[6]
(United States) S Querrey (United States) V Spadea	6	6
2	(Sweden) S Aspelin (Sweden) R Lindstedt	4	4

Quarterfinals
(United Kingdom) J Auckland (Australia) S Huss	3	3^{r}
WC	(United States) S Lipsky (United States) D Martin	6	2
3	(United States) P Goldstein (United States) J Thomas	4	3
(United States) E Butorac (United Kingdom) J Murray	6	6
(Russia) T Gabashvili (Russia) M Safin	3	5
4	(South Africa) C Haggard (Germany) R Schüttler	6	7
WC	(United States) A Delić (United States) R Kendrick	6	7
(United States) S Querrey (United States) V Spadea	2	5

Semifinals
WC	(United States) S Lipsky (United States) D Martin	4	6^{7}
(United States) E Butorac (United Kingdom) J Murray	6	7^{9}
4	(South Africa) C Haggard (Germany) R Schüttler	7	6
WC	(United States) A Delić (United States) R Kendrick	5	4

Final
(United States) E Butorac (United Kingdom) J Murray	7	7^{8}
4	(South Africa) C Haggard (Germany) R Schüttler	5	6^{6}
