= 2007 SAP Open =

- Date: February 12–18
- Edition: 119th
- Category: International Series
- Draw: 32S / 16D
- Prize money: $391,000
- Surface: Hard / indoor
- Location: San Jose, California, U.S.
- Venue: HP Pavilion

Champions

Singles
- (United Kingdom) Andy Murray

Doubles
- (United States) Eric Butorac / (United Kingdom) Jamie Murray
| ← 2006 · | Pacific Coast Championships | · 2008 → |

The 2007 SAP Open was a men's tennis tournament played on indoor hard courts. It was the 119th edition of the tournament, and was part of the International Series of the 2007 ATP Tour. It took place at the HP Pavilion in San Jose, California, United States, from February 12 through February 18, 2007. Third-seeded and reigning champion Andy Murray won the singles title.

== Finals ==
(United Kingdom) Andy Murray defeated (Croatia) Ivo Karlović 6–7^{(3–7)}, 6–4, 7–6^{(7–2)}

=== Doubles ===
(United States) Eric Butorac / (United Kingdom) Jamie Murray defeated (South Africa) Chris Haggard / (Germany) Rainer Schüttler 7–5, 7–6^{(8–6)}
