= 2006 SAP Open – Singles =

Singles
- 2006 SAP Open

Final
- Champion: (United Kingdom) Andy Murray
- Runner-up: (Australia) Lleyton Hewitt
- Score: 2–6, 6–1, 7–6^{(7–3)}

Details
- Draw: 32 (4Q / 3WC)
- Seeds: 8

Events
Singles	Doubles
← 2005 ·	Pacific Coast Championships	· 2007 →

Andy Roddick was the defending champion, but lost in the semifinals to eventual champion Andy Murray.

Murray defeated Lleyton Hewitt 2–6, 6–1, 7–6^{(7–3)}, to become 2006 SAP Open Champion, and claim his first ever ATP Tour title.

== Seeds ==
1. (United States) Andy Roddick (semifinals)
2. (United States) Andre Agassi (withdrew)
3. (Australia) Lleyton Hewitt (final)
4. (Spain) Tommy Robredo (first round)
5. (United States) James Blake (first round)
6. (Romania) Victor Hănescu (withdrew)
7. (Russia) Dmitry Tursunov (second round)
8. (Croatia) Ivo Karlović (first round)

== Draw ==
=== Key ===
- Q = Qualifier
- WC = Wild card
- LL = Lucky loser
- Alt = Alternate
- SE = Special exempt
- PR = Protected ranking
- ITF = ITF entry
- JE = Junior exempt
- w/o = Walkover
- r = Retired
- d = Defaulted
- SR = Special ranking

=== Finals ===
Semifinals
1	(United States) Andy Roddick	5	5
(United Kingdom) Andy Murray	7	7
3	(Australia) Lleyton Hewitt	6	6
(United States) Vince Spadea	3	4

Final
(United Kingdom) Andy Murray	2	6	7^{7}
3	(Australia) Lleyton Hewitt	6	1	6^{3}

=== Top half ===
First round
1	(United States) A Roddick	6	6
(Spain) G García López	3	4
(Czech Republic) L Dlouhý	6	2	1
(Denmark) K Carlsen	3	6	6
(France) C Saulnier	4	5
(Germany) B Phau	6	7
Q	(United States) B Wilson	7	7
8	(Croatia) I Karlović	6^{1}	6^{5}
4	(Spain) T Robredo	6	5	5
WC	(Australia) M Philippoussis	3	7	7
(Romania) A Pavel	3	4
(Sweden) R Söderling	6	6
(United Kingdom) A Murray	6	6
WC	(United States) M Fish	2	2
(Chinese Taipei) W Yeu-tzuoo	6	7
5	(United States) J Blake	3	5

Second round
1	(United States) A Roddick	6	1	6
(Denmark) K Carlsen	3	6	3
(Germany) B Phau	7	7
Q	(United States) B Wilson	5	5
WC	(Australia) M Philippoussis	2	3
(Sweden) R Söderling	6	6
(United Kingdom) A Murray	6	6
(Chinese Taipei) W Yeu-tzuoo	4	2

Quarterfinals
1	(United States) A Roddick	6	6
(Germany) B Phau	3	2
(Sweden) R Söderling	6	5	4
(United Kingdom) A Murray	4	7	6

Semifinals
1	(United States) A Roddick	5	5
(United Kingdom) A Murray	7	7

=== Bottom half ===
First round
7	(Russia) D Tursunov	4	6	6
(Sweden) J Björkman	6	3	2
(Australia) W Arthurs	4	7	7
(United States) B Reynolds	6	5	5
(Sweden) J Johansson	3	6	3
Q	(United States) S Warburg	6	4	6
(United States) P Goldstein	4	2
3	(Australia) L Hewitt	6	6
LL	(Sweden) B Rehnquist	1	4
Q	(United States) J Gimelstob	6	6
(Germany) R Schüttler	1	3
(Belgium) K Vliegen	6	6
Q	(United States) S Querrey	7	4	2
(United States) V Spadea	6^{4}	6	6
WC	(United States) S Jenkins	5	6	3
LL	(United States) T Rettenmaier	7	3	6

Second round
7	(Russia) D Tursunov	3	7	3
(Australia) W Arthurs	6	6^{5}	6
Q	(United States) S Warburg	4	3
3	(Australia) L Hewitt	6	6
Q	(United States) J Gimelstob	6^{1}	6	2
(Belgium) K Vliegen	7	4	6
(United States) V Spadea	6	6
LL	(United States) T Rettenmaier	2	0

Quarterfinals
(Australia) W Arthurs	6^{4}	2
3	(Australia) L Hewitt	7	6
(Belgium) K Vliegen	1	6	3
(United States) V Spadea	6	2	6

Semifinals
3	(Australia) L Hewitt	6	6
(United States) V Spadea	3	4
