= 2012 Sony Ericsson Open – Men's singles =

Men's singles
- 2012 Sony Ericsson Open

Final
- Champion: (Serbia) Novak Djokovic
- Runner-up: (United Kingdom) Andy Murray
- Score: 6–1, 7–6^{(7–4)}

Details
- Draw: 96 (12Q / 5WC)
- Seeds: 32

Events
Singles	men	women
Doubles	men	women
← 2011 ·	Sony Ericsson Open	· 2013 →

Defending champion Novak Djokovic defeated Andy Murray in the final, 6–1, 7–6^{(7–4)} to win the men's singles tennis title at the 2012 Miami Open. It was his third Miami Open title. He did not lose a single set in the entire tournament.

== Seeds ==
All seeds received a bye into the second round.

1. (Serbia) Novak Djokovic (champion)
2. (Spain) Rafael Nadal (semifinals, withdrew because of a left knee injury)
3. (Switzerland) Roger Federer (third round)
4. (United Kingdom) Andy Murray (final)
5. (Spain) David Ferrer (quarterfinals)
6. (France) Jo-Wilfried Tsonga (quarterfinals)
7. (Czech Republic) Tomáš Berdych (third round)
8. (United States) Mardy Fish (quarterfinals)
9. (Serbia) Janko Tipsarević (quarterfinals)
10. (United States) John Isner (third round)
11. (Argentina) Juan Martín del Potro (fourth round)
12. (Spain) Nicolás Almagro (fourth round)
13. (France) Gilles Simon (fourth round)
14. (France) Gaël Monfils (third round)
15. (Spain) Feliciano López (second round)
16. (Japan) Kei Nishikori (fourth round)
17. (France) Richard Gasquet (fourth round)
18. (Ukraine) Alexandr Dolgopolov (third round)
19. (Germany) Florian Mayer (fourth round)
20. (Spain) Fernando Verdasco (third round)
21. (Argentina) Juan Mónaco (semifinals)
22. (Austria) Jürgen Melzer (third round)
23. (Croatia) Marin Čilić (third round)
24. (Spain) Marcel Granollers (second round)
25. (Czech Republic) Radek Štěpánek (third round)
26. (Canada) Milos Raonic (third round, withdrew because of a sprained right ankle)
27. (Serbia) Viktor Troicki (third round)
28. (South Africa) Kevin Anderson (third round)
29. (Argentina) Juan Ignacio Chela (second round)
30. (France) Julien Benneteau (third round)
31. (United States) Andy Roddick (fourth round)
32. (Germany) Philipp Kohlschreiber (third round)

== Draw ==
=== Key ===
- Q = Qualifier
- WC = Wild card
- LL = Lucky loser
- Alt = Alternate
- SE = Special exempt
- PR = Protected ranking
- ITF = ITF entry
- JE = Junior exempt
- w/o = Walkover
- r = Retired
- d = Defaulted
- SR = Special ranking

=== Finals ===
Quarterfinals
1	(Serbia) Novak Djokovic	6	7^{7}
5	(Spain) David Ferrer	2	6^{1}
21	(Argentina) Juan Mónaco	6	6
8	(United States) Mardy Fish	1	3
9	(Serbia) Janko Tipsarević	6	3	4
4	(United Kingdom) Andy Murray	4	6	6
6	(France) Jo-Wilfried Tsonga	2	7	4
2	(Spain) Rafael Nadal	6	5	6

Semifinals
1	(Serbia) Novak Djokovic	6	7^{7}
21	(Argentina) Juan Mónaco	0	6^{5}
4	(United Kingdom) Andy Murray	w/o
2	(Spain) Rafael Nadal

Final
1	(Serbia) Novak Djokovic	6	7^{7}
4	(United Kingdom) Andy Murray	1	6^{4}

=== Top half ===
==== Section 1 ====
First round
(Argentina) L Mayer	1	4
(Cyprus) M Baghdatis	6	6
Q	(Spain) G García López	6	7^{9}
Q	(United States) R Ram	4	6^{7}
(Germany) C-M Stebe	6	7
(Italy) F Cipolla	3	5
(Spain) A Ramos	6	6
Q	(Italy) S Bolelli	3	1

Second round
1	(Serbia) N Djokovic	6	6
(Cyprus) M Baghdatis	4	4
Q	(Spain) G García López	6	1	4
27	(Serbia) V Troicki	4	6	6
17	(France) R Gasquet	6	6^{6}	6
(Germany) C-M Stebe	3	7^{8}	2
(Spain) A Ramos	6	7^{7}
15	(Spain) F López	4	6^{5}

Third round
1	(Serbia) N Djokovic	6	6
27	(Serbia) V Troicki	3	4
17	(France) R Gasquet	6	5	6
(Spain) A Ramos	2	7	3

Fourth round
1	(Serbia) N Djokovic	7	6
17	(France) R Gasquet	5	3

==== Section 2 ====
First round
(Poland) Ł Kubot	3	7^{7}	6^{2}
(Croatia) I Karlović	6	6^{2}	7^{7}
(Russia) I Kunitsyn	7^{10}	7^{7}
WC	(United States) J Levine	6^{8}	6^{3}
PR	(Germany) B Becker	5	6	6
(Belgium) O Rochus	7	3	2
(Ukraine) S Stakhovsky	6^{4}	3
(Australia) B Tomic	7^{7}	6

Second round
11	(Argentina) JM del Potro	7	6
(Croatia) I Karlović	5	4
(Russia) I Kunitsyn	3	6^{1}
23	(Croatia) M Čilić	6	7^{7}
30	(France) J Benneteau	3	6	7^{7}
PR	(Germany) B Becker	6	3	6^{4}
(Australia) B Tomic	4	4
5	(Spain) D Ferrer	6	6

Third round
11	(Argentina) JM del Potro	6	7^{7}
23	(Croatia) M Čilić	3	6^{3}
30	(France) J Benneteau	6^{5}	4
5	(Spain) D Ferrer	7^{7}	6

Fourth round
11	(Argentina) JM del Potro	3	3
5	(Spain) D Ferrer	6	6

==== Section 3 ====
First round
WC	(United States) R Harrison	6^{6}	6	6
(Italy) P Starace	7^{8}	4	4
(Russia) A Bogomolov Jr.	7	4	6^{5}
(Luxembourg) G Müller	5	6	7^{7}
(Chinese Taipei) Y-h Lu	6	6
(Finland) J Nieminen	4	3
Q	(Ukraine) S Bubka	6	6
(Latvia) E Gulbis	4	4

Second round
3	(Switzerland) R Federer	6	7^{7}
WC	(United States) R Harrison	2	6^{3}
(Luxembourg) G Müller	3	2
31	(United States) A Roddick	6	6
21	(Argentina) J Mónaco	5
(Chinese Taipei) Y-h Lu	0^{r}
Q	(Ukraine) S Bubka	4	4
14	(France) G Monfils	6	6

Third round
3	(Switzerland) R Federer	6^{4}	6	4
31	(United States) A Roddick	7^{7}	1	6
21	(Argentina) J Mónaco	4	6	6
14	(France) G Monfils	6	3	4

Fourth round
31	(United States) A Roddick	5	0
21	(Argentina) J Mónaco	7	6

==== Section 4 ====
First round
Q	(Belgium) D Goffin	7	6
(United States) D Young	5	4
Q	(Germany) B Phau	6	6
(Argentina) C Berlocq	4	2
(United States) S Querrey	6	5	7
(Australia) M Ebden	1	7	5
Q	(Canada) F Dancevic	7	7^{7}
(France) J Chardy	5	6^{0}

Second round
12	(Spain) N Almagro	6	6
Q	(Belgium) D Goffin	4	2
Q	(Germany) B Phau	3	0
20	(Spain) F Verdasco	6	6
28	(South Africa) K Anderson	6	6^{3}	6
(United States) S Querrey	3	7^{7}	3
Q	(Canada) F Dancevic	3	6^{1}
8	(United States) M Fish	6	7^{7}

Third round
12	(Spain) N Almagro	6	6
20	(Spain) F Verdasco	3	4
28	(South Africa) K Anderson	4	3
8	(United States) M Fish	6	6

Fourth round
12	(Spain) N Almagro	3	7^{7}	3
8	(United States) M Fish	6	6^{2}	6

=== Bottom half ===
==== Section 5 ====
First round
(France) N Mahut	7	4	7^{7}
WC	(Chile) F González	5	6	6^{3}
(Bulgaria) G Dimitrov	6	6
(Kazakhstan) M Kukushkin	2	2
Q	(Croatia) A Veić	2	6	6
WC	(United States) D Kudla	6	2	1
(Argentina) D Nalbandian	6	7^{7}
(Belgium) S Darcis	4	6^{0}

Second round
7	(Czech Republic) T Berdych	7	6
(France) N Mahut	5	1
(Bulgaria) G Dimitrov	6	4	6
29	(Argentina) JI Chela	2	6	4
18	(Ukraine) A Dolgopolov	6	7
Q	(Croatia) A Veić	4	5
(Argentina) D Nalbandian	5	3
9	(Serbia) J Tipsarević	7	6

Third round
7	(Czech Republic) T Berdych	3	6	4
(Bulgaria) G Dimitrov	6	2	6
18	(Ukraine) A Dolgopolov	4	7	2
9	(Serbia) J Tipsarević	6	5	6

Fourth round
(Bulgaria) G Dimitrov	6^{3}	2
9	(Serbia) J Tipsarević	7^{7}	6

==== Section 6 ====
First round
Q	(Spain) R Bautista-Agut	6	1	6
(Italy) A Seppi	3	6	3
(Netherlands) R Haase	6	6
WC	(Australia) M Matosevic	3	4
(Israel) D Sela	3	3
Q	(France) A Clément	6	6
(Colombia) A Falla	6	2
(Uzbekistan) D Istomin	1	1^{r}

Second round
13	(France) G Simon	6	6
Q	(Spain) R Bautista-Agut	4	2
(Netherlands) R Haase	6^{2}	6	4
22	(Austria) J Melzer	7^{7}	3	6
26	(Canada) M Raonic	7^{9}	6
Q	(France) A Clément	6^{7}	2
(Colombia) A Falla	2	3
4	(United Kingdom) A Murray	6	6

Third round
13	(France) G Simon	7^{7}	6
22	(Austria) J Melzer	6^{5}	4
26	(Canada) M Raonic
4	(United Kingdom) A Murray	w/o

Fourth round
13	(France) G Simon	3	4
4	(United Kingdom) A Murray	6	6

==== Section 7 ====
First round
Q	(France) É Roger-Vasselin	6^{3}	3
(Belgium) X Malisse	7^{7}	6
(Brazil) T Bellucci	3	4
(Portugal) F Gil	6	6
LL	(Germany) T Kamke	0	6	6^{5}
(Croatia) I Dodig	6	2	7^{7}
(Russia) N Davydenko	4	6	6
(United States) J Blake	6	4	4

Second round
6	(France) J-W Tsonga	7	7
(Belgium) X Malisse	5	5
(Portugal) F Gil	2	5
32	(Germany) P Kohlschreiber	6	7
19	(Germany) F Mayer	6	7
(Croatia) I Dodig	4	5
(Russia) N Davydenko	6	3	4
10	(United States) J Isner	2	6	6

Third round
6	(France) J-W Tsonga	6	7^{7}
32	(Germany) P Kohlschreiber	4	6^{2}
19	(Germany) F Mayer	6	6
10	(United States) J Isner	4	2

Fourth round
6	(France) J-W Tsonga	6	6
19	(Germany) F Mayer	3	2

==== Section 8 ====
First round
(United States) R Sweeting	4	4
(Slovakia) L Lacko	6	6
(France) M Llodra	4	6^{6}
(Czech Republic) L Rosol	6	7^{8}
Q	(France) G Rufin	4	4
PR	(Germany) T Haas	6	6
(Spain) P Andújar	3	2
(Colombia) S Giraldo	6	6

Second round
16	(Japan) K Nishikori	6	6
(Slovakia) L Lacko	3	3
(Czech Republic) L Rosol	2	6	6
24	(Spain) M Granollers	6	3	1
25	(Czech Republic) R Štěpánek	7^{7}	6
PR	(Germany) T Haas	6^{4}	1
(Colombia) S Giraldo	2	0
2	(Spain) R Nadal	6	6

Third round
16	(Japan) K Nishikori	6	6
(Czech Republic) L Rosol	4	2
25	(Czech Republic) R Štěpánek	2	2
2	(Spain) R Nadal	6	6

Fourth round
16	(Japan) K Nishikori	4	4
2	(Spain) R Nadal	6	6

== Qualifying ==
=== Seeds ===
1. (France) Édouard Roger-Vasselin (qualified)
2. (Germany) Tobias Kamke (qualifying competition, lucky loser)
3. (Spain) Guillermo García López (qualified)
4. (Germany) Matthias Bachinger (qualifying competition)
5. (France) Benoît Paire (qualifying competition)
6. (Italy) Paolo Lorenzi (qualifying competition)
7. (France) Éric Prodon (first round)
8. (Russia) Igor Andreev (first round)
9. (United States) Wayne Odesnik (withdrew because of an abdominal injury)
10. (Turkey) Marsel İlhan (first round)
11. (Italy) Simone Bolelli (qualified)
12. (Germany) Björn Phau (qualified)
13. (United States) Bobby Reynolds (qualifying competition)
14. (Brazil) Rogério Dutra da Silva (first round)
15. (South Africa) Rik de Voest (first round)
16. (Brazil) Ricardo Mello (first round)
17. (Estonia) Jürgen Zopp (first round, retired because of an ankle injury)
18. (Argentina) Horacio Zeballos (first round)
19. (Netherlands) Thomas Schoorel (first round)
20. (United States) Michael Russell (qualifying competition)
21. (Slovenia) Grega Žemlja (first round, retired because of illness)
22. (Chile) Paul Capdeville (qualifying competition)
23. (Russia) Teymuraz Gabashvili (withdrew because of a knee injury)
24. (Kazakhstan) Andrey Golubev (first round)

=== Qualifiers ===
1. (France) Édouard Roger-Vasselin
2. (Croatia) Antonio Veić
3. (Spain) Guillermo García López
4. (United States) Rajeev Ram
5. (Belgium) David Goffin
6. (Spain) Roberto Bautista Agut
7. (France) Guillaume Rufin
8. (France) Arnaud Clément
9. (Canada) Frank Dancevic
10. (Ukraine) Sergei Bubka
11. (Italy) Simone Bolelli
12. (Germany) Björn Phau

=== Lucky losers ===
1. (Germany) Tobias Kamke

=== Key ===
- Q = Qualifier
- WC = Wild card
- LL = Lucky loser
- Alt = Alternate
- SE = Special exempt
- PR = Protected ranking
- ITF = ITF entry
- JE = Junior exempt
- w/o = Walkover
- r = Retired
- d = Defaulted
- SR = Special ranking

==== First qualifier ====
First round
1	(France) Édouard Roger-Vasselin	6	0
(Russia) Alexander Kudryavtsev	2	0^{r}
(United Kingdom) James Ward	6	6
24	(Kazakhstan) Andrey Golubev	3	3

Qualifying competition
1	(France) Édouard Roger-Vasselin	6	6
(United Kingdom) James Ward	3	3

==== Second qualifier ====
First round
2	(Germany) Tobias Kamke	6	0
(Brazil) Júlio Silva	2	0^{r}
(Croatia) Antonio Veić	7	0
21	(Slovenia) Grega Žemlja	5	0^{r}

Qualifying competition
2	(Germany) Tobias Kamke	4	2
(Croatia) Antonio Veić	6	6

==== Third qualifier ====
First round
3	(Spain) Guillermo García López	6	3	6
(Italy) Matteo Viola	3	6	4
(Italy) Simone Vagnozzi	1	4
13	(United States) Bobby Reynolds	6	6

Qualifying competition
3	(Spain) Guillermo García López	7^{7}	6
13	(United States) Bobby Reynolds	6^{1}	4

==== Fourth qualifier ====
First round
4	(Germany) Matthias Bachinger	6	6
(Belgium) Ruben Bemelmans	4	2
(United States) Rajeev Ram	6	6
Alt	(Russia) Mikhail Elgin	2	4

Qualifying competition
4	(Germany) Matthias Bachinger	2	4
(United States) Rajeev Ram	6	6

==== Fifth qualifier ====
First round
5	(France) Benoît Paire	6	2	6
(United States) Alex Kuznetsov	1	6	4
(Belgium) David Goffin	4
17	(Estonia) Jürgen Zopp	0^{r}

Qualifying competition
5	(France) Benoît Paire	2	2
(Belgium) David Goffin	6	6

==== Sixth qualifier ====
First round
6	(Italy) Paolo Lorenzi	7^{10}	6
(Spain) Arnau Brugués Davi	6^{8}	3
(Spain) Roberto Bautista Agut	7^{7}	4	7^{8}
15	(South Africa) Rik de Voest	6^{5}	6	6^{6}

Qualifying competition
6	(Italy) Paolo Lorenzi	7	4	5
(Spain) Roberto Bautista Agut	5	6	7

==== Seventh qualifier ====
First round
7	(France) Éric Prodon	3	3
(Argentina) Facundo Bagnis	6	6
(France) Guillaume Rufin	7	6
18	(Argentina) Horacio Zeballos	5	1

Qualifying competition
(Argentina) Facundo Bagnis	0	1
(France) Guillaume Rufin	6	6

==== Eighth qualifier ====
First round
8	(Russia) Igor Andreev	7^{10}	4	2
(France) Arnaud Clément	6^{8}	6	6
WC	(Portugal) Gastão Elias	6	3	4
22	(Chile) Paul Capdeville	1	6	6

Qualifying competition
(France) Arnaud Clément	7	6
22	(Chile) Paul Capdeville	5	1

==== Ninth qualifier ====
First round
Alt	(Dominican Republic) Víctor Estrella	6^{8}	4
(Japan) Yūichi Sugita	7^{10}	6
(Canada) Frank Dancevic	6	6
16	(Brazil) Ricardo Mello	4	4

Qualifying competition
(Japan) Yūichi Sugita	6	3	1
(Canada) Frank Dancevic	4	6	6

==== Tenth qualifier ====
First round
10	(Turkey) Marsel İlhan	4	1
WC	(Switzerland) Marco Chiudinelli	6	6
WC	(Ukraine) Sergei Bubka	7	6
14	(Brazil) Rogério Dutra da Silva	5	4

Qualifying competition
WC	(Switzerland) Marco Chiudinelli	3	1r
WC	(Ukraine) Sergei Bubka	6	3

==== Eleventh qualifier ====
First round
11	(Italy) Simone Bolelli	4	7^{7}	6
(Bosnia and Herzegovina) Amer Delić	6	6^{5}	3
(France) Florent Serra	6	6
19	(Netherlands) Thomas Schoorel	3	2

Qualifying competition
11	(Italy) Simone Bolelli	7^{7}	7
(France) Florent Serra	6^{2}	5

==== Twelfth qualifier ====
First round
12	(Germany) Björn Phau	7^{7}	6
WC	(United Kingdom) Daniel Evans	6^{4}	0
WC	(United States) Tim Smyczek	6	3	2
20	(United States) Michael Russell	4	6	6

Qualifying competition
12	(Germany) Björn Phau	3	6	6
20	(United States) Michael Russell	6	1	2
