= 2007 SAP Open – Singles =

Singles
- 2007 SAP Open

Final
- Champion: (United Kingdom) Andy Murray
- Runner-up: (Croatia) Ivo Karlović
- Score: 6–7^{(3–7)}, 6–4, 7–6^{(7–2)}

Details
- Draw: 32 (4Q / 3WC)
- Seeds: 8

Events
Singles	Doubles
← 2006 ·	Pacific Coast Championships	· 2008 →

Andy Murray was the defending champion, and as the third seed won in the final 6–7^{(3–7)}, 6–4, 7–6^{(7–2)}, against unseeded Ivo Karlović.

== Seeds ==
1. (United States) Andy Roddick (semifinals)
2. (United States) James Blake (second round)
3. (United Kingdom) Andy Murray (champion)
4. (Russia) Marat Safin (quarterfinals)
5. (United States) Mardy Fish (quarterfinals)
6. (Germany) Benjamin Becker (semifinals)
7. (South Korea) Hyung-taik Lee (quarterfinals)
8. (United States) Vincent Spadea (quarterfinals)

== Main draw ==
=== Key ===
- Q = Qualifier
- WC = Wild card
- LL = Lucky loser
- Alt = Alternate
- SE = Special exempt
- PR = Protected ranking
- ITF = ITF entry
- JE = Junior exempt
- w/o = Walkover
- r = Retired
- d = Defaulted
- SR = Special ranking

=== Finals ===
Semifinals
1	(United States) Andy Roddick	6^{8}	4
3	(United Kingdom) Andy Murray	7	6
6	(Germany) Benjamin Becker	6^{5}	5
(Croatia) Ivo Karlović	7	7

Final
3	(United Kingdom) Andy Murray	6^{3}	6	7
(Croatia) Ivo Karlović	7	4	6^{2}

=== Top half ===
First round
1	(United States) A Roddick	7	6
(Canada) F Dancevic	5	1
(United States) P Goldstein	2	1
WC	(United States) S Querrey	6	6
(Germany) R Schüttler	6^{1}	1
(Spain) F López	7	6
(Thailand) D Udomchoke	3	4
8	(United States) V Spadea	6	6
3	(United Kingdom) A Murray	6	6
(United States) K Kim	3	1
(Denmark) K Pless	7	6
Q	(Ukraine) S Stakhovsky	5	1
(United States) R Kendrick	3	2
(Germany) S Greul	6	6
Q	(United States) P King	6^{4}	3
7	(South Korea) H-t Lee	7	6

Second round
1	(United States) A Roddick	6	7
WC	(United States) S Querrey	4	6^{3}
(Spain) F López	6	5	6^{6}
8	(United States) V Spadea	4	7	7
3	(United Kingdom) A Murray	6	6^{5}	6
(Denmark) K Pless	0	7	4
(Germany) S Greul	2	6^{3}
7	(South Korea) H-t Lee	6	7

Quarterfinals
1	(United States) A Roddick	6	6^{5}	6
8	(United States) V Spadea	3	7	1
3	(United Kingdom) A Murray	4	6	7
7	(South Korea) H-t Lee	6	3	6^{4}

Semifinals
1	(United States) A Roddick	6^{8}	4
3	(United Kingdom) A Murray	7	6

=== Bottom half ===
First round
6	(Germany) B Becker	6	3	6
Q	(Serbia) D Vemić	4	6	4
(Greece) K Economidis	2	3
(Germany) B Phau	6	6
(Chinese Taipei) Y-h Lu	6	6
(United States) B Wilson	1	2
WC	(United States) S Oudsema	4	6^{3}
4	(Russia) M Safin	6	7
5	(United States) M Fish	6	6
(Russia) T Gabashvili	3	2
(United States) A Delić	4	3
WC	(United States) S Warburg	6	6
(Croatia) I Karlović	6	7
(Spain) G García López	3	6^{7}
(Russia) I Kunitsyn	3	2
2	(United States) J Blake	6	6

Second round
6	(Germany) B Becker	7	1	6
(Germany) B Phau	6^{4}	6	3
(Chinese Taipei) Y-h Lu	4	7	4
4	(Russia) M Safin	6	5	6
5	(United States) M Fish	2	6	6
WC	(United States) S Warburg	6	4	2
(Croatia) I Karlović	6^{4}	7	6
2	(United States) J Blake	7	6^{11}	4

Quarterfinals
6	(Germany) B Becker	6	6
4	(Russia) M Safin	4	3
5	(United States) M Fish	6^{5}	5
(Croatia) I Karlović	7	7

Semifinals
6	(Germany) B Becker	6^{5}	5
(Croatia) I Karlović	7	7
