= 2012 Rakuten Japan Open Tennis Championships =

- Date: 1–7 October
- Edition: 39th
- Category: ATP World Tour 500
- Surface: Hard / outdoor
- Location: Tokyo, Japan
- Venue: Ariake Coliseum

Champions

Singles
- (Japan) Kei Nishikori

Doubles
- (Austria) Alexander Peya / (Brazil) Bruno Soares
| ← 2011 · | Japan Open | · 2013 → |

The 2012 Rakuten Japan Open Tennis Championships was a men's tennis tournament played on outdoor hard courts. It was the 39th edition of the event known this year as the Rakuten Japan Open Tennis Championships, and part of the 500 Series of the 2012 ATP World Tour. It was held at the Ariake Coliseum in Tokyo, Japan, from October 1 till October 7, 2012. Kei Nishikori won the singles title

== Singles main-draw entrants ==
=== Seeds ===
| Country | Player | Rank^{1} | Seed |
|---|---|---|---|
| GBR | Andy Murray | 3 | 1 |
| CZE | Tomáš Berdych | 6 | 2 |
| SRB | Janko Tipsarević | 9 | 3 |
| ARG | Juan Mónaco | 11 | 4 |
| ESP | Nicolás Almagro | 12 | 5 |
| CAN | Milos Raonic | 15 | 6 |
| SWI | Stanislas Wawrinka | 16 | 7 |
| JPN | Kei Nishikori | 17 | 8 |

- ^{1} Rankings are based on the rankings of September 24, 2012.

=== Other entrants ===
The following players received wildcards into the singles main draw:

- (Japan) Tatsuma Ito
- (Japan) Hiroki Moriya
- (Japan) Yūichi Sugita

The following players received entry from the qualifying draw:

- (Switzerland) Marco Chiudinelli
- (Bulgaria) Grigor Dimitrov
- (Ukraine) Sergiy Stakhovsky
- (Russia) Dmitry Tursunov

The following player received entry as lucky loser:

- (Croatia) Ivo Karlović

=== Withdrawals ===
- (United States) Mardy Fish
- (France) Gaël Monfils (right knee injury)

=== Retirements ===
- (Serbia) Viktor Troicki (calf muscle injury)

== Doubles main-draw entrants ==
=== Seeds ===
| Country | Player | Country | Player | Rank^{1} | Seed |
|---|---|---|---|---|---|
| IND | Leander Paes | CZE | Radek Štěpánek | 14 | 1 |
| PAK | Aisam-ul-Haq Qureshi | NED | Jean-Julien Rojer | 29 | 2 |
| MEX | Santiago González | USA | Scott Lipsky | 54 | 3 |
| AUT | Alexander Peya | BRA | Bruno Soares | 57 | 4 |

- Rankings are as of September 24, 2012

=== Other entrants ===
The following pairs received wildcards into the doubles main draw:

- (Japan) Hiroki Moriya / (Japan) Takao Suzuki
- (Japan) Yūichi Sugita / (Japan) Yasutaka Uchiyama

=== Retirements ===
- (Serbia) Janko Tipsarević (tonsillitis)

== Finals ==
=== Singles ===
(Japan) Kei Nishikori defeated (Canada) Milos Raonic, 7–6^{(7–5)}, 3–6, 6–0

=== Doubles ===
(Austria) Alexander Peya / (Brazil) Bruno Soares defeated (India) Leander Paes / (Czech Republic) Radek Štěpánek, 6–3, 7–6^{(7–5)}
