= 2011 Rakuten Japan Open Tennis Championships – Singles qualifying =

This article displays the qualifying draw of the 2011 Rakuten Japan Open Tennis Championships.

== Players ==
=== Seeds ===
1. (United States) Ryan Sweeting (first round)
2. (Chinese Taipei) Lu Yen-hsun (qualifying competition)
3. (Slovakia) Karol Beck (first round)
4. (United States) Ryan Harrison (qualified)
5. (Germany) Michael Berrer (qualifying competition)
6. (Israel) Dudi Sela (qualified)
7. (Germany) Rainer Schüttler (qualifying competition)
8. (Australia) Matthew Ebden (qualified)

=== Qualifiers ===
1. (Israel) Dudi Sela
2. (Australia) Matthew Ebden
3. (Switzerland) Marco Chiudinelli
4. (United States) Ryan Harrison

== Qualifying draw ==
=== First qualifier ===
First round
1	(United States) Ryan Sweeting	3	2
(Australia) Marinko Matosevic	6	6
(Israel) Amir Weintraub	2	4
6	(Israel) Dudi Sela	6	6

Qualifying competition
(Australia) Marinko Matosevic	6^{4}	6	4
6	(Israel) Dudi Sela	7^{7}	3	6

=== Second qualifier ===
First round
2	(Chinese Taipei) Lu Yen-hsun	6	6
Alt	(Italy) Riccardo Ghedin	1	0
WC	(Japan) Hiroyasu Ehara	2	6^{6}
8	(Australia) Matthew Ebden	6	7^{8}

Qualifying competition
2	(Chinese Taipei) Lu Yen-hsun	6	6^{5}	5
8	(Australia) Matthew Ebden	2	7^{7}	7

=== Third qualifier ===
First round
3	(Slovakia) Karol Beck	4	1
(Switzerland) Marco Chiudinelli	6	6
(Australia) Greg Jones	3	6	2
5	(Germany) Michael Berrer	6	4	6

Qualifying competition
(Switzerland) Marco Chiudinelli	7^{7}	6
5	(Germany) Michael Berrer	6^{5}	4

=== Fourth qualifier ===
First round
4	(United States) Ryan Harrison	6^{1}	6	6
WC	(Japan) Yasutaka Uchiyama	7^{7}	2	4
WC	(Japan) Hiroki Moriya	3	6^{1}
7	(Germany) Rainer Schüttler	6	7^{7}

Qualifying competition
4	(United States) Ryan Harrison	6^{5}	5
7	(Germany) Rainer Schüttler	7^{7}	3^{r}
