= 2011 Rakuten Japan Open Tennis Championships – Doubles =

Doubles
- 2011 Rakuten Japan Open Tennis Championships

Final
- Champions: (United Kingdom) Andy Murray (United Kingdom) Jamie Murray
- Runners-up: (Czech Republic) František Čermák (Slovakia) Filip Polášek
- Score: 6–1, 6–4

Details
- Draw: 16 (2WC)
- Seeds: 4

Events
Singles	Doubles
- Japan Open

Eric Butorac and Jean-Julien Rojer were the defending champions but were eliminated in the second round by Robin Haase and Viktor Troicki. Andy Murray and Jamie Murray won the title after beating František Čermák and Filip Polášek 6–1, 6–4 in the final.

== Seeds ==
1. (India) Rohan Bopanna / (Pakistan) Aisam-ul-Haq Qureshi (first round)
2. (United States) Eric Butorac / (Curaçao) Jean-Julien Rojer (second round)
3. (Germany) Christopher Kas / (Austria) Alexander Peya (first round)
4. (Czech Republic) František Čermák / (Slovakia) Filip Polášek (final)

== Draw ==
Key

- Q = Qualifier
- WC = Wild card
- LL = Lucky loser
- Alt = Alternate
- ITF = ITF entry
- PR = Protected ranking
- SR = Special ranking
- SE = Special exempt
- JE = Junior exempt
- JR = Junior Accelerator Programme entrant
- CO = College Accelerator Programme entrant
- NG = Next Gen Accelerator Program entrant
- w/o = Walkover
- r = Retired
- d = Defaulted

=== Draw ===
First round
1	(India) R Bopanna (Pakistan) A-u-H Qureshi	4	3
(Brazil) M Melo (Brazil) B Soares	6	6
(Poland) Ł Kubot (Czech Republic) R Štěpánek	6	6
(Germany) M Kohlmann (Germany) P Petzschner	1	4
4	(Czech Republic) F Čermák (Slovakia) F Polášek	6	6
WC	(Japan) Y Uchiyama (United States) D Young	4	1
(Italy) D Bracciali (Mexico) S González	3	4
(Spain) D Ferrer (Spain) M López	6	6
(Spain) P Andújar (Canada) M Raonic	5	7^{7}	[6]
(United Kingdom) A Murray (United Kingdom) J Murray	7	6^{2}	[10]
WC	(Japan) T Ito (Japan) K Nishikori	4	6	[10]
3	(Germany) C Kas (Austria) A Peya	6	4	[4]
(Netherlands) R Haase (Serbia) V Troicki	6^{4}	6	[10]
(United States) A Bogomolov Jr. (Argentina) J Mónaco	7^{7}	4	[5]
(Croatia) I Dodig (Spain) G García-López	3	6^{5}
2	(United States) E Butorac (Curaçao) J-J Rojer	6	7^{7}

Quarterfinals
(Brazil) M Melo (Brazil) B Soares	7^{7}	6^{5}	[10]
(Poland) Ł Kubot (Czech Republic) R Štěpánek	6^{5}	7^{7}	[3]
4	(Czech Republic) F Čermák (Slovakia) F Polášek	6	3	[10]
(Spain) D Ferrer (Spain) M López	2	6	[8]
(United Kingdom) A Murray (United Kingdom) J Murray	6	6
WC	(Japan) T Ito (Japan) K Nishikori	3	4
(Netherlands) R Haase (Serbia) V Troicki	6	6
2	(United States) E Butorac (Curaçao) J-J Rojer	4	2

Semifinals
(Brazil) M Melo (Brazil) B Soares	6	5	[7]
4	(Czech Republic) F Čermák (Slovakia) F Polášek	3	7	[10]
(United Kingdom) A Murray (United Kingdom) J Murray	6	1	[10]
(Netherlands) R Haase (Serbia) V Troicki	3	6	[6]

Finals
4	(Czech Republic) F Čermák (Slovakia) F Polášek	1	4
(United Kingdom) A Murray (United Kingdom) J Murray	6	6
