= 2016 ATP World Tour Finals – Singles =

Singles
- 2016 ATP World Tour Finals

Final
- Champion: (United Kingdom) Andy Murray
- Runner-up: (Serbia) Novak Djokovic
- Score: 6–3, 6–4

Events
Singles	Doubles
- ATP World Tour Finals

Andy Murray defeated four-time defending champion Novak Djokovic in the final, 6–3, 6–4 to win the singles tennis title at the 2016 ATP World Tour Finals. With the win, Murray attained the year-end No. 1 ranking for the first time. Murray won the longest three-set match in the tournament's history, 3 hours and 38 minutes, in the semifinals against Milos Raonic, saving a match point en route to the title.

Roger Federer, whose season was curtailed by injury, did not qualify for the Tour Finals for the first time since 2001, ending his record streak of 14 consecutive appearances. He fell to world No. 16 in the rankings as a result, ending his streak of 734-consecutive weeks in the world's top 10, the third longest streak in the Open Era. Rafael Nadal qualified, but also withdrew due to injury.

Gaël Monfils, Dominic Thiem and David Goffin (as an alternate replacing Monfils) made their debuts in the event.

== Seeds ==
1. (United Kingdom) Andy Murray (champion)
2. (Serbia) Novak Djokovic (final)
3. (Switzerland) Stan Wawrinka (round robin)
4. (Canada) Milos Raonic (semifinals)
5. (Japan) Kei Nishikori (semifinals)
6. (France) Gaël Monfils (round robin, withdrew due to injury)
7. (Croatia) Marin Čilić (round robin)
8. (Austria) Dominic Thiem (round robin)

== Alternates ==
1. (Belgium) David Goffin (replaced Monfils, round robin)
2. (Spain) Roberto Bautista Agut (Did not play)

== Draw ==
Key

- Q = Qualifier
- WC = Wild card
- LL = Lucky loser
- Alt = Alternate
- ITF = ITF entry
- PR = Protected ranking
- SR = Special ranking
- SE = Special exempt
- JE = Junior exempt
- JR = Junior Accelerator Programme entrant
- CO = College Accelerator Programme entrant
- NG = Next Gen Accelerator Program entrant
- w/o = Walkover
- r = Retired
- d = Defaulted

=== Finals ===
Semifinals
1	(United Kingdom) Andy Murray	5	7^{7}	7^{11}
4	(Canada) Milos Raonic	7	6^{5}	6^{9}
2	(Serbia) Novak Djokovic	6	6
5	(Japan) Kei Nishikori	1	1

Final
1	(United Kingdom) Andy Murray	6	6
2	(Serbia) Novak Djokovic	3	4

=== Group John McEnroe ===
		(United Kingdom) Murray	(Switzerland) Wawrinka	(Japan) Nishikori	(Croatia) Čilić	RR W–L	Set W–L	Game W–L	Standings
1	(United Kingdom) Andy Murray		6–4, 6–2	6–7^{(9–11)}, 6–4, 6–4	6–3, 6–2	3–0	6–1 (85.7%)	42–26 (61.8%)	1
3	(Switzerland) Stan Wawrinka	4–6, 2–6		2–6, 3–6	7–6^{(7–3)}, 7–6^{(7–3)}	1–2	2–4 (33.3%)	25–36 (41.0%)	3
5	(Japan) Kei Nishikori	7–6^{(11–9)}, 4–6, 4–6	6–2, 6–3		6–3, 2–6, 3–6	1–2	4–4 (50.0%)	38–38 (50.0%)	2
7	(Croatia) Marin Čilić	3–6, 2–6	6–7^{(3–7)}, 6–7^{(3–7)}	3–6, 6–2, 6–3		1–2	2–5 (28.6%)	32–37 (46.4%)	4

Standings are determined by: 1. number of wins; 2. number of matches; 3. in two-players-ties, head-to-head records; 4. in three-players-ties, percentage of sets won, then percentage of games won, then head-to-head records; 5. ATP rankings.

=== Group Ivan Lendl ===
		(Serbia) Djokovic	(Canada) Raonic	(France) Monfils (Belgium) Goffin	(Austria) Thiem	RR W–L	Set W–L	Game W–L	Standings
2	(Serbia) Novak Djokovic		7–6^{(8–6)}, 7–6^{(7–5)}	6–1, 6–2 (w/ Goffin)	6–7^{(10–12)}, 6–0, 6–2	3–0	6–1 (85.7%)	44–24 (64.7%)	1
4	(Canada) Milos Raonic	6–7^{(6–8)}, 6–7^{(5–7)}		6–3, 6–4 (w/ Monfils)	7–6^{(7–5)}, 6–3	2–1	4–2 (66.7%)	37–30 (55.2%)	2
6; 9	(France) Gaël Monfils (Belgium) David Goffin	1–6, 2–6 (w/ Goffin)	3–6, 4–6 (w/ Monfils)		3–6, 6–1, 4–6 (w/ Monfils)	0–2; 0–1	1–4 (20.0%); 0–2 (0%)	20–25 (44.4%); 3–12 (20.0%)	X 4
8	(Austria) Dominic Thiem	7–6^{(12–10)}, 0–6, 2–6	6–7^{(5–7)}, 3–6	6–3, 1–6, 6–4 (w/ Monfils)		1–2	3–5 (37.5%)	31–44 (41.3%)	3

Standings are determined by: 1. number of wins; 2. number of matches; 3. in two-players-ties, head-to-head records; 4. in three-players-ties, percentage of sets won, then percentage of games won, then head-to-head records; 5. ATP rankings.
