= 2012 Rakuten Japan Open Tennis Championships – Singles =

Singles
- 2012 Rakuten Japan Open Tennis Championships

Final
- Champion: (Japan) Kei Nishikori
- Runner-up: (Canada) Milos Raonic
- Score: 7–6^{(7–5)}, 3–6, 6–0

Details
- Draw: 32 (4Q / 3WC)
- Seeds: 8

Events
Singles	Doubles
← 2011 ·	Japan Open	· 2013 →

Andy Murray was the defending champion, but lost to Milos Raonic in the semifinals.
Eighth-seeded Kei Nishikori won the title beating Milos Raonic in the final 7–6^{(7–5)}, 3–6, 6–0, and in doing so became the first home grown winner of the title since Toshiro Sakai in 1972.

== Seeds ==
1. (United Kingdom) Andy Murray (semifinals)
2. (Czech Republic) Tomáš Berdych (quarterfinals)
3. (Serbia) Janko Tipsarević (quarterfinals)
4. (Argentina) Juan Mónaco (second round)
5. (Spain) Nicolás Almagro (first round)
6. (Canada) Milos Raonic (final)
7. (Switzerland) Stanislas Wawrinka (quarterfinals)
8. (Japan) Kei Nishikori (champion)

== Draw ==
=== Key ===
- Q = Qualifier
- WC = Wild card
- LL = Lucky loser
- Alt = Alternate
- SE = Special exempt
- PR = Protected ranking
- ITF = ITF entry
- JE = Junior exempt
- w/o = Walkover
- r = Retired
- d = Defaulted
- SR = Special ranking

=== Finals ===
Semifinals
1	(United Kingdom) Andy Murray	3	7^{7}	6^{4}
6	(Canada) Milos Raonic	6	6^{5}	7^{7}
(Cyprus) Marcos Baghdatis	2	2
8	(Japan) Kei Nishikori	6	6

Final
6	(Canada) Milos Raonic	6^{5}	6	0
8	(Japan) Kei Nishikori	7^{7}	3	6

=== Top half ===
First round
1	(United Kingdom) A Murray	7^{9}	6
LL	(Croatia) I Karlović	6^{7}	4
(Spain) A Ramos	0	2
(Slovakia) L Lacko	6	6
(France) J Chardy	6	7
WC	(Japan) Y Sugita	1	5
WC	(Japan) H Moriya	5	6	4
7	(Switzerland) S Wawrinka	7	4	6
3	(Serbia) J Tipsarević	4	6	6
(France) G Simon	6	3	1
(Slovakia) M Kližan	6^{3}	2
Q	(Switzerland) M Chiudinelli	7^{7}	6
(Serbia) V Troicki	6	6
(Netherlands) R Haase	2	3
(Czech Republic) R Štěpánek	4	4
6	(Canada) M Raonic	6	6

Second round
1	(United Kingdom) A Murray	6	6
(Slovakia) L Lacko	1	2
(France) J Chardy	6^{1}	7^{8}	5
7	(Switzerland) S Wawrinka	7^{7}	6^{6}	7
3	(Serbia) J Tipsarević	6	6
Q	(Switzerland) M Chiudinelli	4	2
(Serbia) V Troicki	0^{r}
6	(Canada) M Raonic	3

Quarterfinals
1	(United Kingdom) A Murray	6	3	6
7	(Switzerland) S Wawrinka	2	6	2
3	(Serbia) J Tipsarević	7^{7}	2	6^{7}
6	(Canada) M Raonic	6^{5}	6	7^{9}

Semifinals
1	(United Kingdom) A Murray	3	7^{7}	6^{4}
6	(Canada) M Raonic	6	6^{5}	7^{7}

=== Bottom half ===
First round
5	(Spain) N Almagro	6^{4}	6^{5}
WC	(Japan) T Ito	7^{7}	7^{7}
Q	(Russia) D Tursunov	6	7
(Australia) B Tomic	4	5
Q	(Ukraine) S Stakhovsky	6^{3}	5
(Cyprus) M Baghdatis	7^{7}	7
Q	(Bulgaria) G Dimitrov	2	1
4	(Argentina) J Mónaco	6	6
8	(Japan) K Nishikori	4	6	6
(Japan) G Soeda	6	2	3
(Finland) J Nieminen	2	4
PR	(Spain) T Robredo	6	6
(Brazil) T Bellucci	5	2
(Colombia) A Falla	7	6
(France) B Paire	1	6^{6}
2	(Czech Republic) T Berdych	6	7^{8}

Second round
WC	(Japan) T Ito	5	3
Q	(Russia) D Tursunov	7	6
(Cyprus) M Baghdatis	7	1	6
4	(Argentina) J Mónaco	5	6	3
8	(Japan) K Nishikori	5	6	6
PR	(Spain) T Robredo	7	1	0
(Colombia) A Falla	3	5
2	(Czech Republic) T Berdych	6	7

Quarterfinals
Q	(Russia) D Tursunov	2	4
(Cyprus) M Baghdatis	6	6
8	(Japan) K Nishikori	7	6
2	(Czech Republic) T Berdych	5	4

Semifinals
(Cyprus) M Baghdatis	2	2
8	(Japan) K Nishikori	6	6

== Qualifying ==
=== Seeds ===
1. (Bulgaria) Grigor Dimitrov (qualified)
2. (Croatia) Ivo Karlović (qualifying competition, lucky loser)
3. (Ukraine) Sergiy Stakhovsky (qualified)
4. (Russia) Dmitry Tursunov (qualified)
5. (Germany) Philipp Petzschner (qualifying competition)
6. (Canada) Vasek Pospisil (qualifying competition)
7. (Switzerland) Marco Chiudinelli (qualified)
8. (Serbia) Dušan Lajović (qualifying competition)

=== Qualifiers ===
1. (Bulgaria) Grigor Dimitrov
2. (Switzerland) Marco Chiudinelli
3. (Ukraine) Sergiy Stakhovsky
4. (Russia) Dmitry Tursunov

=== Lucky loser ===
1. (Croatia) Ivo Karlović

=== Draw ===
==== First qualifier ====
First round
1	(Bulgaria) Grigor Dimitrov	7	6
(Japan) Hiroki Kondo	5	4
(Italy) Riccardo Ghedin	6^{3}	4
6	(Canada) Vasek Pospisil	7^{7}	6

Qualifying competition
1	(Bulgaria) Grigor Dimitrov	6	6^{5}	6
6	(Canada) Vasek Pospisil	4	7^{7}	2

==== Second qualifier ====
First round
2	(Croatia) Ivo Karlović	6	6
(Japan) Yasutaka Uchiyama	4	2
WC	(Japan) Hiroyasu Ehara	4	3
7	(Switzerland) Marco Chiudinelli	6	6

Qualifying competition
2	(Croatia) Ivo Karlović	3	7^{8}	6^{5}
7	(Switzerland) Marco Chiudinelli	6	6^{6}	7^{7}

==== Third qualifier ====
First round
3	(Ukraine) Sergiy Stakhovsky	4	7^{7}	7
(Japan) Toshihide Matsui	6	6^{4}	5
WC	(Japan) Shuichi Sekiguchi	1	5
8	(Serbia) Dušan Lajović	6	7

Qualifying competition
3	(Ukraine) Sergiy Stakhovsky	4	7	6
8	(Serbia) Dušan Lajović	6	5	0

==== Fourth qualifier ====
First round
4	(Russia) Dmitry Tursunov	6	7^{8}
WC	(Japan) Kaichi Uchida	4	6^{6}
(Japan) Kento Takeuchi	7^{7}	4	3
5	(Germany) Philipp Petzschner	6^{4}	6	6

Qualifying competition
4	(Russia) Dmitry Tursunov	6	6
5	(Germany) Philipp Petzschner	1	4
