= 2011 Rakuten Japan Open Tennis Championships – Singles =

Singles
- 2011 Rakuten Japan Open Tennis Championships

Final
- Champion: (United Kingdom) Andy Murray
- Runner-up: (Spain) Rafael Nadal
- Score: 3–6, 6–2, 6–0

Details
- Draw: 32 (4Q / 3WC)
- Seeds: 8

Events
Singles	Doubles
← 2010 ·	Japan Open	· 2012 →

Rafael Nadal was the defending champion, but lost in the final to second-seeded Andy Murray, 3–6, 6–2, 6–0.

== Seeds ==
1. (Spain) Rafael Nadal (final)
2. (United Kingdom) Andy Murray (champion)
3. (Spain) David Ferrer (semifinals)
4. (United States) Mardy Fish (semifinals)
5. (Serbia) Viktor Troicki (first round)
6. (Serbia) Janko Tipsarević (first round)
7. (Czech Republic) Radek Štěpánek (quarterfinals)
8. (Argentina) Juan Mónaco (first round)

== Draw ==
=== Key ===
- Q = Qualifier
- WC = Wild card
- LL = Lucky loser
- Alt = Alternate
- SE = Special exempt
- PR = Protected ranking
- ITF = ITF entry
- JE = Junior exempt
- w/o = Walkover
- r = Retired
- d = Defaulted
- SR = Special ranking

=== Finals ===
Semifinals
1	(Spain) Rafael Nadal	7	6
4	(United States) Mardy Fish	5	1
3	(Spain) David Ferrer	2	3
2	(United Kingdom) Andy Murray	6	6

Final
1	(Spain) Rafael Nadal	6	2	0
2	(United Kingdom) Andy Murray	3	6	6

=== Top half ===
First round
1	(Spain) R Nadal	6	6
WC	(Japan) G Soeda	3	2
(Canada) M Raonic	6^{4}	6	7^{7}
WC	(Japan) Y Sugita	7^{7}	3	6^{1}
(Netherlands) R Haase	3	6^{5}
(Colombia) S Giraldo	6	7^{7}
(Russia) D Tursunov	7^{8}	6^{3}	7
6	(Serbia) J Tipsarević	6^{6}	7^{7}	5
4	(United States) M Fish	6	3	7
Q	(United States) R Harrison	4	6	5
(Latvia) E Gulbis	6	3	7
(Poland) Ł Kubot	3	6	5
WC	(Japan) T Ito	6	3	6
Q	(Israel) D Sela	4	6	3
(Australia) B Tomic	7^{8}	7^{7}
5	(Serbia) V Troicki	6^{6}	6^{1}

Second round
1	(Spain) R Nadal	7	6
(Canada) M Raonic	5	3
(Colombia) S Giraldo	6	7^{7}
(Russia) D Tursunov	4	6^{4}
4	(United States) M Fish	6	6
(Latvia) E Gulbis	2	4
WC	(Japan) T Ito	7^{7}	1	5
(Australia) B Tomic	6^{4}	6	7

Quarterfinals
1	(Spain) R Nadal	7^{8}	6
(Colombia) S Giraldo	6^{6}	3
4	(United States) M Fish	6^{5}	6	6
(Australia) B Tomic	7^{7}	4	1

Semifinals
1	(Spain) R Nadal	7	6
4	(United States) M Fish	5	1

=== Bottom half ===
First round
7	(Czech Republic) R Štěpánek	6	6
(India) S Devvarman	4	3
Q	(Switzerland) M Chiudinelli	6	4	6
(Spain) G García-López	1	6	4
Q	(Australia) M Ebden	6^{4}	6	6
(Spain) P Andújar	7^{7}	4	4
(Japan) K Nishikori	4	3
3	(Spain) D Ferrer	6	6
8	(Argentina) J Mónaco	2	6	6^{1}
(Croatia) I Dodig	6	2	7^{7}
(Argentina) D Nalbandian	6	6
(Czech Republic) L Rosol	1	1
(Finland) J Nieminen	4	4
(United States) A Bogomolov Jr.	6	6
(Cyprus) M Baghdatis	6^{4}	6	4
2	(United Kingdom) A Murray	7^{7}	2	6

Second round
7	(Czech Republic) R Štěpánek	7	6^{5}	6
Q	(Switzerland) M Chiudinelli	5	7^{7}	1
Q	(Australia) M Ebden	6	2	2
3	(Spain) D Ferrer	4	6	6
(Croatia) I Dodig	6^{2}	2
(Argentina) D Nalbandian	7^{7}	6
(United States) A Bogomolov Jr.	1	2
2	(United Kingdom) A Murray	6	6

Quarterfinals
7	(Czech Republic) R Štěpánek	2	6^{3}
3	(Spain) D Ferrer	6	7^{7}
(Argentina) D Nalbandian	4	5
2	(United Kingdom) A Murray	6	7

Semifinals
3	(Spain) D Ferrer	2	3
2	(United Kingdom) A Murray	6	6
