= 2012 Rakuten Japan Open Tennis Championships – Doubles =

Doubles
- 2012 Rakuten Japan Open Tennis Championships

Final
- Champions: (Austria) Alexander Peya (Brazil) Bruno Soares
- Runners-up: (India) Leander Paes (Czech Republic) Radek Štěpánek
- Score: 6–3, 7–6^{(7–5)}

Details
- Draw: 16 (2WC)
- Seeds: 4

Events
Singles	Doubles
- Japan Open

Andy Murray and Jamie Murray were the defending champions, but lost in the quarterfinals to first seeded Leander Paes and Radek Štěpánek.
Alexander Peya and Bruno Soares won the title, defeating Paes and Štěpánek 6–3, 7–6^{(7–5)} in the final.

== Seeds ==
1. (India) Leander Paes / (Czech Republic) Radek Štěpánek (final)
2. (Pakistan) Aisam-ul-Haq Qureshi / (Netherlands) Jean-Julien Rojer (first round)
3. (Mexico) Santiago González / (United States) Scott Lipsky (first round)
4. (Austria) Alexander Peya / (Brazil) Bruno Soares (champions)

== Draw ==
Key

- Q = Qualifier
- WC = Wild card
- LL = Lucky loser
- Alt = Alternate
- ITF = ITF entry
- PR = Protected ranking
- SR = Special ranking
- SE = Special exempt
- JE = Junior exempt
- JR = Junior Accelerator Programme entrant
- CO = College Accelerator Programme entrant
- NG = Next Gen Accelerator Program entrant
- w/o = Walkover
- r = Retired
- d = Defaulted

=== Draw ===
First round
1	(India) L Paes (Czech Republic) R Štěpánek	6	6
(Austria) J Knowle (Slovakia) F Polášek	4	4
(United States) E Butorac (Finland) J Nieminen	7	3	[4]
(United Kingdom) A Murray (United Kingdom) J Murray	5	6	[10]
3	(Mexico) S González (United States) S Lipsky	6^{1}	3
(Argentina) J Mónaco (Japan) K Nishikori	7^{7}	6
WC	(Japan) Y Sugita (Japan) Y Uchiyama	2	6^{4}
(Italy) D Bracciali (Czech Republic) F Čermák	6	7^{7}
WC	(Japan) H Moriya (Japan) T Suzuki	3	4
(France) J Chardy (Brazil) M Melo	6	6
(France) B Paire (Switzerland) S Wawrinka	5	2
4	(Austria) A Peya (Brazil) B Soares	7	6
(Philippines) TC Huey (United Kingdom) J Marray	6^{4}	5
(Germany) P Petzschner (Serbia) J Tipsarević	7^{7}	7
(Czech Republic) T Berdych (Serbia) N Zimonjić	7^{7}	6
2	(Pakistan) A-u-H Qureshi (Netherlands) J-J Rojer	6^{5}	3

Quarterfinals
1	(India) L Paes (Czech Republic) R Štěpánek	6	3	[10]
(United Kingdom) A Murray (United Kingdom) J Murray	4	6	[2]
(Argentina) J Mónaco (Japan) K Nishikori	1	6^{2}
(Italy) D Bracciali (Czech Republic) F Čermák	6	7^{7}
(France) J Chardy (Brazil) M Melo	7^{7}	3	[8]
4	(Austria) A Peya (Brazil) B Soares	6^{4}	6	[10]
(Germany) P Petzschner (Serbia) J Tipsarević
(Czech Republic) T Berdych (Serbia) N Zimonjić	w/o

Semifinals
1	(India) L Paes (Czech Republic) R Štěpánek	6	6
(Italy) D Bracciali (Czech Republic) F Čermák	3	1
4	(Austria) A Peya (Brazil) B Soares	6	6
(Czech Republic) T Berdych (Serbia) N Zimonjić	4	4

Final
1	(India) L Paes (Czech Republic) R Štěpánek	3	6^{5}
4	(Austria) A Peya (Brazil) B Soares	6	7^{7}
