= 2011 Rakuten Japan Open Tennis Championships =

- Date: 3–9 October
- Edition: 38th
- Category: ATP World Tour 500
- Surface: Hard / outdoor
- Location: Tokyo, Japan
- Venue: Ariake Coliseum

Champions

Singles
- (United Kingdom) Andy Murray

Doubles
- (United Kingdom) Andy Murray / (United Kingdom) Jamie Murray
← 2010 ·	Japan Open	· 2012 →

The 2011 Rakuten Japan Open Tennis Championships was a men's tennis tournament played on outdoor hard courts. It was the 38th edition of the event known that year as the Rakuten Japan Open Tennis Championships, and was part of the 500 Series of the 2011 ATP World Tour. It was held at the Ariake Coliseum in Tokyo, Japan, from 3 October through 9 October 2011. Andy Murray won both the singles and doubles titles, the latter with his brother Jamie.

== Singles main-draw entrants ==
=== Seeds ===
Country	Player	Rank^{1}	Seed
ESP	Rafael Nadal	2	1
GBR	Andy Murray	4	2
ESP	David Ferrer	5	3
USA	Mardy Fish	8	4
SRB	Viktor Troicki	15	5
SRB	Janko Tipsarević	17	6
CZE	Radek Štěpánek	24	7
ARG	Juan Mónaco	27	8

- Rankings are based on the rankings of September 26, 2011.

=== Other entrants ===
The following players received wildcards into the singles main draw:

- (Japan) Tatsuma Ito
- (Japan) Go Soeda
- (Japan) Yūichi Sugita

The following players received entry from the qualifying draw:

- (Switzerland) Marco Chiudinelli
- (Australia) Matthew Ebden
- (United States) Ryan Harrison
- (Israel) Dudi Sela

== Finals ==
=== Singles ===
(United Kingdom) Andy Murray defeated (Spain) Rafael Nadal, 3–6, 6–2, 6–0

- It was Murray's 4th title of the year and 20th of his career.

=== Doubles ===
(United Kingdom) Andy Murray / (United Kingdom) Jamie Murray defeated (Czech Republic) František Čermák / (Slovakia) Filip Polášek, 6–1, 6–4
