= Andy Murray =

British former tennis player (born 1987)

Sir Andy Murray OBE
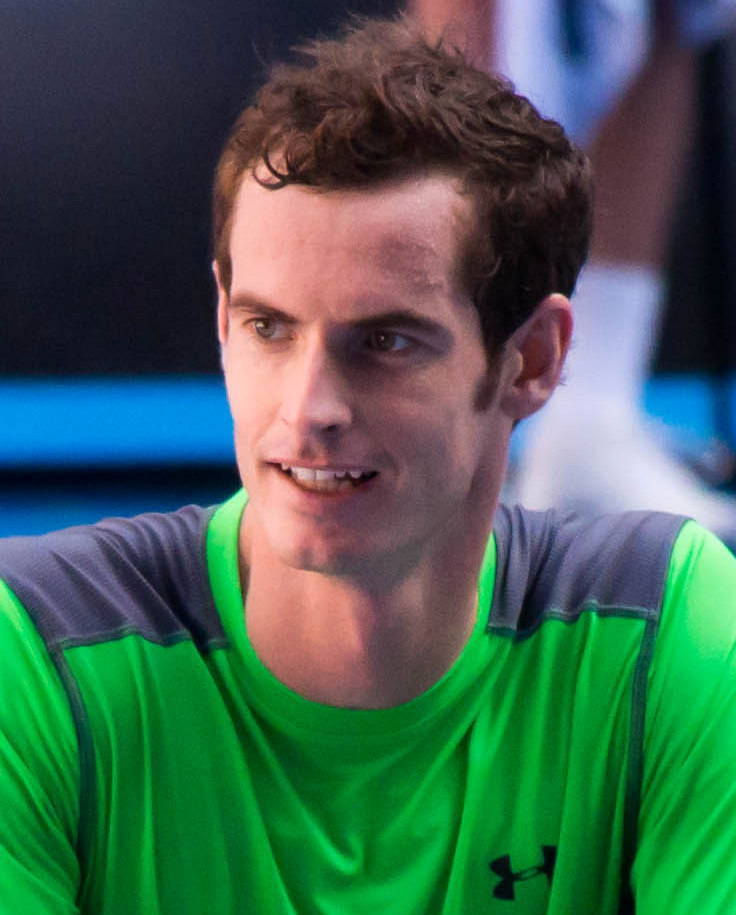
- Murray at the 2015 Australian Open
- Full name: Andrew Barron Murray
- Country (sports): (United Kingdom) Great Britain
- Born: 15 May 1987 (age 39) Glasgow, Scotland
- Height: 6 ft 3 in (1.91 m)
- Turned pro: 2005
- Retired: 1 August 2024
- Plays: Right-handed (two-handed backhand)
- Coach: Ivan Lendl (2012–2014, 2016–2017, 2022–2023)
- Prize money: US$64,687,542: 7th all-time in earnings

Singles
- Career record: 739–262 (73.8%) (Note: In ATP Tour and Grand Slam main draw matches, Summer Olympics, Davis Cup, Laver Cup, ATP Cup and United Cup; 17th in the Open Era)
- Career titles: 46 (15th in the Open Era)
- Highest ranking: No. 1 (7 November 2016)

Grand Slam singles results
- Australian Open: F (2010, 2011, 2013, 2015, 2016)
- French Open: F (2016)
- Wimbledon: W (2013, 2016)
- US Open: W (2012)

Other tournaments
- Tour Finals: W (2016)
- Olympic Games: W (2012, 2016)

Doubles
- Career record: 83–86 (49.1%)
- Career titles: 3
- Highest ranking: No. 51 (17 October 2011)

Grand Slam doubles results
- Australian Open: 1R (2006)
- French Open: 2R (2006)
- Wimbledon: 2R (2019)
- US Open: 2R (2008)

Other doubles tournaments
- Olympic Games: QF (2020, 2024)

Mixed doubles
- Career record: 7–4
- Career titles: 0

Grand Slam mixed doubles results
- Wimbledon: 3R (2019)

Other mixed doubles tournaments
- Olympic Games: F (2012)

Team competitions
- Davis Cup: W (2015)
- Hopman Cup: F (2010)

Coaching career (2024–)
- Novak Djokovic (2024–2025); Jack Draper (2026–)
Medal record
Men's Tennis
Representing Great Britain
Olympic Games
| Gold medal – first place | 2012 London | Singles |
| Gold medal – first place | 2016 Rio de Janeiro | Singles |
| Silver medal – second place | 2012 London | Mixed doubles |

Sir Andrew Barron Murray (born 15 May 1987) is a British professional tennis coach and former player. He was ranked as the world No. 1 in men's singles by the Association of Tennis Professionals (ATP) for 41 weeks, including as the year-end No. 1 in 2016. Murray won 46 ATP Tour singles titles, including three majors at the 2012 US Open, 2013 Wimbledon Championships, and 2016 Wimbledon Championships. He also won two gold medals at the Summer Olympics, the 2016 ATP World Tour Finals, 14 Masters events, and finished runner-up at eight other majors for a total of eleven major finals.

Murray began his professional career at the time Rafael Nadal and Roger Federer were the dominant players in men's tennis. Murray had rapid success on the ATP Tour, making his top 10 debut in 2007 at age 19. By 2010, Murray and Novak Djokovic had joined Federer and Nadal in the Big Four, the group of players who dominated men's tennis in the 2010s. Murray initially struggled against the rest of the Big Four, losing his first four major finals, but won an Olympic gold medal over Federer at the 2012 London Olympics. He then defeated Djokovic in the final of the 2012 US Open, becoming the first British major singles champion since Virginia Wade in 1977. He then beat Djokovic to win Wimbledon in 2013, the first home champion at the men's singles event since Fred Perry in 1936. In 2015, he led Great Britain to its first Davis Cup title in the Open Era, winning a record eleven rubbers in the event.

Murray had his career-best season in 2016, when he reached the finals of three majors, winning a second career Wimbledon crown. He defended his Olympic gold medal at the 2016 Rio Olympics to become the only player, male or female, to win two Olympic gold medals in singles. Murray became world No. 1 for the first time on 7 November 2016, and clinched the year-end No. 1 ranking by winning the ATP Finals over Djokovic. After 2016 he struggled with a hip injury that required major hip-resurfacing surgery. Upon his return, Murray won a final tour title at the 2019 European Open and returned to the top 50, but failed to reach his previous level, never again reaching the round-of-16 of a major. He retired from the sport after a run to the quarterfinals of the men's doubles at the 2024 Paris Olympics.

Murray possessed one of the most consistent two-handed backhands on the ATP Tour and helped re-establish Great Britain as a leading force in men's tennis. Murray has been outspoken on issues of equality, and became only the second top-10 player in the history of the ATP Tour to have a female coach when he hired Amélie Mauresmo in 2014. Following his playing career, Murray shortly took up a coaching partnership with his former rival Djokovic in 2025, and has since been a coach for fellow British player Jack Draper.

== Early and personal life ==
Andy Murray was born in Glasgow, Scotland, UK the son of Judy Murray (née Erskine) and William Murray. His maternal grandfather, Roy Erskine, was a professional footballer in the late 1950s. Murray is a supporter of Hibernian Football Club, one of the teams his grandfather represented, and Arsenal Football Club. Murray began playing tennis at the age of three, when his mother Judy took him to play on the local courts. He played in his first competitive tournament at age five and by the time he was eight he was competing with adults in the Central District Tennis League. Murray's elder brother, Jamie, was also a professional tennis player.

Murray grew up in Dunblane and attended Dunblane Primary School. Both he and his brother were present during the 1996 Dunblane school massacre, when Thomas Hamilton killed 16 children and a teacher before shooting himself; Murray took cover in a classroom. Murray says he was too young to understand what was happening and is generally reluctant to talk about it in interviews, but in his autobiography Hitting Back he states that he attended a youth group run by Hamilton and his mother gave Hamilton lifts in her car. Murray later attended Dunblane High School.

Murray's parents split up when he was 10, with the boys living with their father while being mentored in tennis by their mother. He believes this could be the reason behind his competitive spirit. At 15, he was asked to train with Rangers Football Club at their School of Excellence, but declined, opting to focus on his tennis career. He then decided to move to Barcelona, Spain. There he trained on the clay courts of the Sánchez-Casal Academy, coached by Pato Alvarez, and also spent time studying at the Schiller International School. Murray described this time as "a big sacrifice". His parents had to pay £40,000 for his 18-month stay. In Spain, he trained with Emilio Sánchez, former world No. 1 doubles player.

Murray was born with a bipartite patella, a condition in which the kneecap remains as two separate bones instead of fusing together in early childhood. It was not diagnosed until he was aged 16. He has been seen holding his knee due to the pain caused by the condition and has withdrawn from tournaments because of it.

In February 2013, Murray bought Cromlix House hotel near Dunblane for £1.8 million. The hotel had been closed since 2012, but Murray reopened it in April 2014. Later that month Murray was awarded the freedom of Stirling and received an Honorary Doctorate from the University of Stirling in recognition of his services to tennis.

Murray began dating Kim Sears, daughter of player-turned-coach Nigel Sears, in 2005. Their engagement was announced in November 2014, and they married on 11 April 2015 at Dunblane Cathedral. The couple previously lived in Oxshott, Surrey, but in 2022, moved to nearby Leatherhead. The newly constructed house will accommodate their young family, consisting of their son and three daughters; the youngest, a girl, was born in March 2021.

Murray has been repeatedly vocal in his support for women players and coaches. He is also a vocal supporter of LGBT+ rights and supports same-sex marriage. In June 2020, he also lent his support to the Black Lives Matter movement, when he and fellow players took a knee during the Schroders Battle of the Brits exhibition tournament.

In May 2025, Murray's net worth was estimated to be £110 million by the Sunday Times Rich List.

In March 2026, Murray became a shareholder in the golf attire brand Manors.

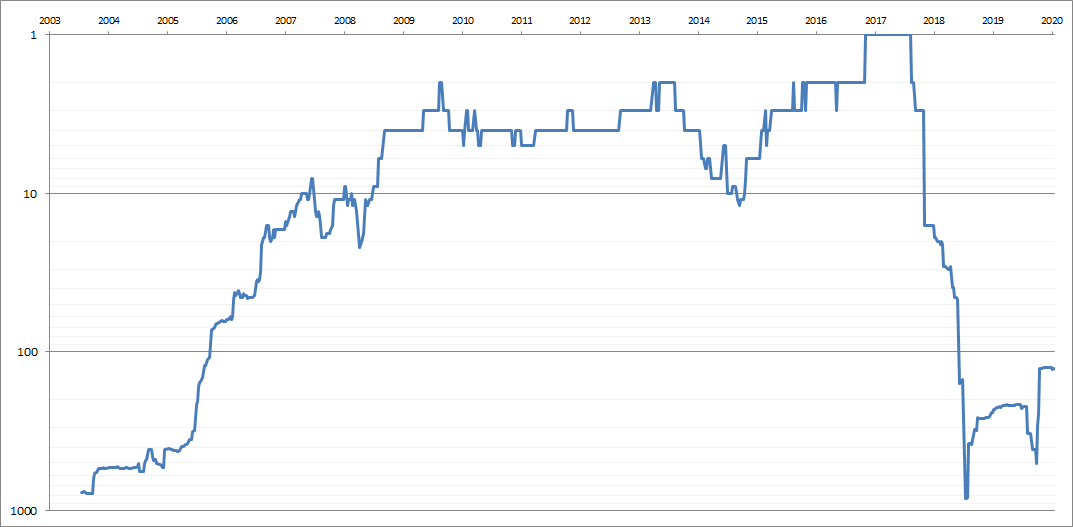
Murray's ranking history chart

== Junior career ==
Leon Smith, Murray's tennis coach from 11 to 17, described Murray as "unbelievably competitive", while Murray attributes his abilities to the motivation gained from losing to his older brother Jamie. In 1999 Murray was a champion in the Orange Bowl, an international tournament for junior players, winning in the 12-year-old category.

In January 2001, Murray participated in the Petits As tournament, an event for players under 14, and it was here that he began his rivalry with Novak Djokovic, beating him 6–0, 6–1 in the quarterfinals. In the semis, Murray overcame Mischa Zverev, but lost the final to Russia's Alexandre Krasnoroutskiy. He then led the British team to victory in the European Winter Cup and won a title in Telford, finishing the season as the No. 2 in the ETA ranking for U14s, only behind Djokovic.

In July 2003, Murray started out on the Challenger and Futures circuit. In his first tournament, he reached the quarter-finals of the Manchester Challenger. In September, Murray won his first senior title by taking the Glasgow Futures event. He also reached the semi-finals of the Edinburgh Futures event.

For the first six months of 2004, Murray had a knee injury and could not play. In July 2004, Murray played a Challenger event in Nottingham, where he lost to future Grand Slam finalist Jo-Wilfried Tsonga in the second round. Murray then went on to win Futures events in Xàtiva and Rome.

In September 2004, he won the Junior US Open and was selected for the Davis Cup World Group play-off match against Austria later that month; however, he was not selected to play. Later that year, he won BBC Young Sports Personality of the Year.

As a junior, Murray reached as high as No. 6 in the world in 2003 (and No. 8 in doubles). In the 2004-instated combined rankings, he reached No. 2 in the world.

=== Junior Slam results ===
- Australian Open: –
- French Open: SF (2005)
- Wimbledon: 3R (2004)
- US Open: W (2004)

== Professional career ==
=== 2000s ===
==== 2005: Turning professional ====
Murray began 2005 ranked No. 407, but whilst in South America in January he injured his back and was forced to take three months off.

In March, he became the youngest Briton to play in the Davis Cup. Murray turned professional in April and was given a wild card entry to a clay-court tournament in Barcelona, the Open SEAT, where he lost in three sets to Jan Hernych. In April, Murray parted acrimoniously from his coach Pato Alvarez, complaining about his negative attitude. Murray then reached the semi-finals of the boys' French Open, where he lost in straight sets to Marin Čilić.

Mark Petchey became Murray's coach. Given a wild card to Queen's, Murray progressed past Santiago Ventura in straight sets for his first ATP match win. Following a second-round win against Taylor Dent, he lost to former Australian Open champion Thomas Johansson in the third round in three sets after cramping and twisting his ankle. Following his performance at Queen's, Murray received a wild card for Wimbledon. Ranked No. 312, Murray became the first Scot in the Open Era to reach the third round of the men's singles tournament at Wimbledon. In the third round, Murray lost to 2002 Wimbledon finalist David Nalbandian due to cramping and fatigue, having led two sets to love.

Murray won Challenger events on the hard courts of Aptos and Binghamton, New York. At Cincinnati, he lost in three sets to then-No. 4, Marat Safin. With a wild card entry, Murray beat Andrei Pavel in the first round of the US Open, where he recovered from down two sets to one to win his first five-set match. However, he lost in the second round to Arnaud Clément in five sets. Murray was again selected for the Davis Cup match against Switzerland. He lost in straight sets to Stanislas Wawrinka. Murray made his first ATP final at the Thailand Open where he lost to No. 1 Roger Federer in straight sets.

Murray beat Tim Henman in their first meeting, at the Basel Swiss Indoors in the first round, and reached the quarter-finals.

Murray completed the year ranked No. 64 and was named the 2005 BBC Scotland Sports Personality of the Year.

==== 2006: First ATP title and British No. 1 ====
The 2006 season saw Murray compete on the full circuit for the first time and split with his coach Mark Petchey and team up with Brad Gilbert.

At San Jose in February, Murray defeated a top ten player for the first time, Andy Roddick. Murray went on to win the title, beating No. 11 Lleyton Hewitt. As a result, Murray became the British No. 1 later that month, ending Tim Henman's seven-year run. Murray was now world No. 42, Greg Rusedski No. 43, and Tim Henman No. 49. Rusedski regained his British No. 1 status on 15 May for eight weeks.

Murray suffered a straight sets defeat at the Australian Open, to Juan Ignacio Chela in the first round and to Gaël Monfils at the French Open, in five sets. Murray reached the fourth round for the first time at both Wimbledon, (beating 3rd seed Andy Roddick in the 3rd round) before losing to Baghdatis and the US Open before losing to Davydenko.

Murray played in Davis Cup ties against Serbia, Israel and Ukraine. Murray missed the opening singles matches before losing the doubles as Britain lost their tie against Serbia. During the tie with Israel, Murray won his rubber and lost the doubles before pulling out with a neck injury before the reverse singles, as Britain lost the tie. Against Ukraine, Murray won both his singles rubbers, but lost the doubles, as Britain won the tie.

At the Masters, Murray lost in the first round in Miami, Monte Carlo and Rome. Murray went out of the tournaments in Indian Wells and Hamburg in the second round. Murray reached his first Masters semi-final in Toronto at the Rogers Cup, losing to Richard Gasquet.

At Cincinnati, Murray became only one of two players, alongside Rafael Nadal, to defeat Roger Federer in 2006, breaking the Swiss star's 55 match winning streak on hard courts. He lost two rounds later to Andy Roddick, but broke into the top 20 for the first time. In the final two Masters events in Madrid and Paris, Murray exited both tournaments at the last-16 stage ending his season, with losses to Novak Djokovic and Dominik Hrbatý. Murray was a finalist at the Legg Mason Tennis Classic. Playing doubles with his brother in Bangkok the pair reached the final. After the French Open, where Murray was injured again, he revealed that his bones hadn't fully grown, causing him to suffer from cramps and back problems. He finished the year ranked 17.

==== 2007: Ascending to the top 10 ====
Murray reached the fourth round of the Australian Open, where he lost a five-set match against No. 2, Rafael Nadal.

Following the Miami Masters, where he reached the semi-finals, Murray reached the No. 10 ranking on 16 April.

The British No. 1 sustained tendon damage during his first round match at the German Open in Hamburg. Murray was up 5–1 when he hit a forehand from the back of the court and snapped the tendons in his wrist, leaving him out of action from 15 May until 7 August, thereby missing Wimbledon. During this rest period, Murray rose to No. 8, but by 7 August, he had dropped to No. 14.

Murray suffered a third round loss at the US Open to Lee Hyung-taik. At the Masters tournaments, Murray reached the semi-finals of Indian Wells and Miami. At Rome and Cincinnati, Murray exited in the first round whilst going out in the second in Canada. In the final two masters tournaments, Murray exited in the third round in Madrid and he went out in the quarter-finals of Paris. Murray won titles in San Jose and St. Petersburg. He also reached the final of tournaments in Doha and Metz, finishing the season ranked 11th in the world.

In November, Murray split with his coach Brad Gilbert and added a team of experts along with Miles Maclagan, his main coach.

==== 2008: First major final and Masters titles ====
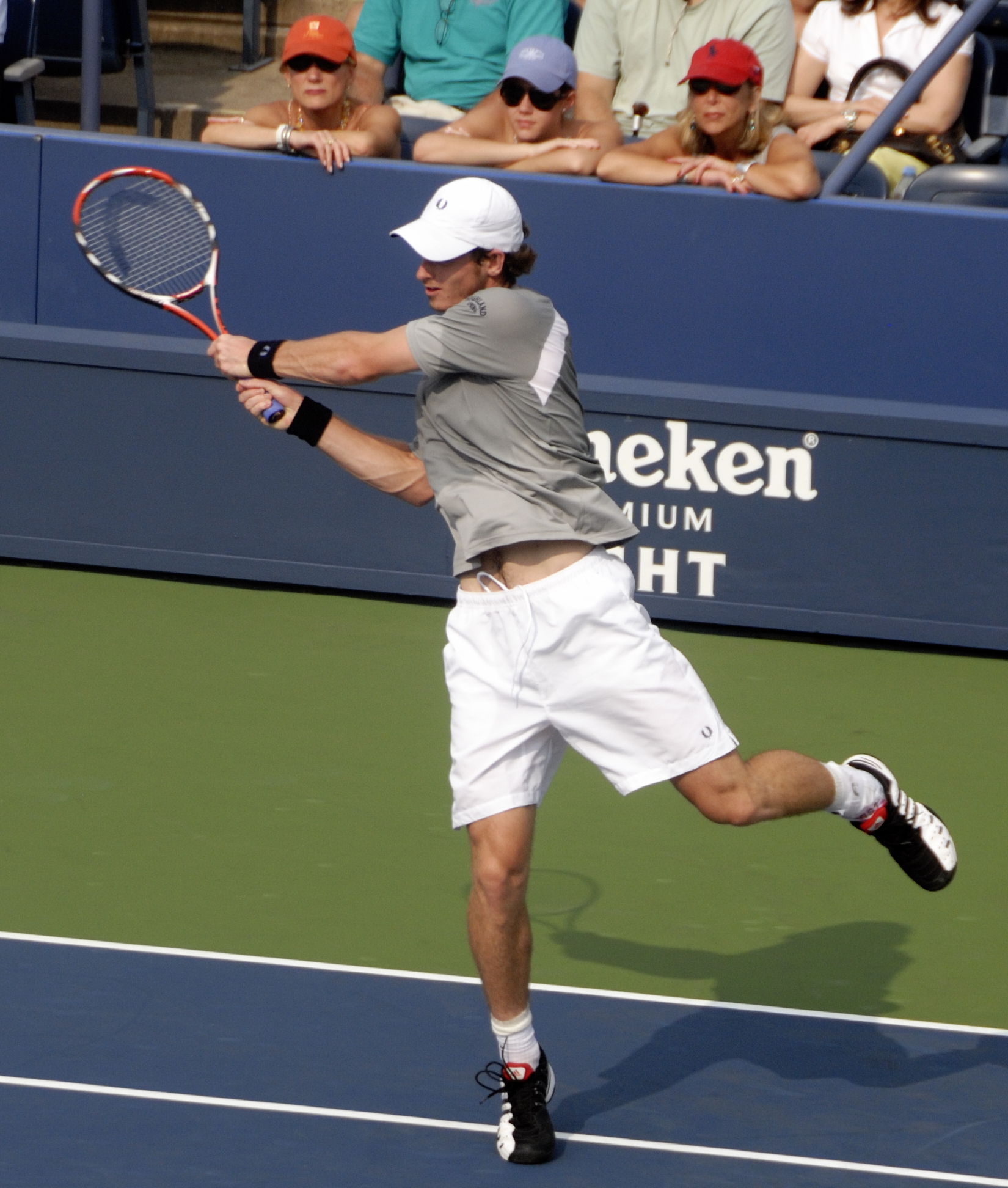
Murray at the 2008 US Open

In 2008, Murray suffered a first round loss at the Australian Open to eventual runner-up Jo-Wilfried Tsonga, and a third round loss at the French Open to Nicolás Almagro. Murray then made his first Grand Slam quarter-final at Wimbledon before making his first final at the US Open. In the fourth round at Wimbledon, Murray defeated Frenchman Richard Gasquet in five sets after trailing two-sets-to-love, a match that garnered excitement and attention in the British press. He then lost in straight sets to the eventual champion, Rafael Nadal. During the tournament in New York, Murray claimed his first win over Nadal. That victory meant that he became the first player from Britain since Greg Rusedski in 1997 to reach a major final. In his first Grand Slam final Murray suffered a straight sets loss to Federer. At the Beijing Olympics, Murray suffered one of the worst defeats of his career, losing his first round singles match to No. 77 Yen-hsun Lu of Taiwan in straight sets. That abject defeat was still on his mind in a BBC interview five years later – despite an intervening Olympic gold medal and a head-to-head win – when he met the same player (now ranked No. 75) in the second round of Wimbledon 2013.

In the Masters tournaments, Murray went out in round four in Indian Wells and the first round of Miami. In the clay Masters Murray made the third round of Monte Carlo and Hamburg and the second of Rome. On the American hard court swing Murray made the semi-finals of Toronto before winning his first Masters shield in Cincinnati. He added another shield to his collection in Madrid; before losing in the quarter-finals of Paris. Now at No. 4 in the world, Murray qualified for the first time for the Masters Cup. He played well in defeating an injured Federer but lost to Davydenko in the semi-finals. Murray ended 2008 ranked No. 4. Murray also won tournaments in Doha, Marseille and St Petersburg.

==== 2009: world No. 2 and two Masters titles ====
At the Qatar Open in Doha, Murray beat Andy Roddick in straight sets in the final. At the Australian Open, Murray made it to the fourth round, losing to Fernando Verdasco. Murray won Rotterdam, defeating No. 1, Nadal in three sets. Murray lost in the final to Nadal at Indian Wells, but won a week later in Miami over Djokovic for another masters title.

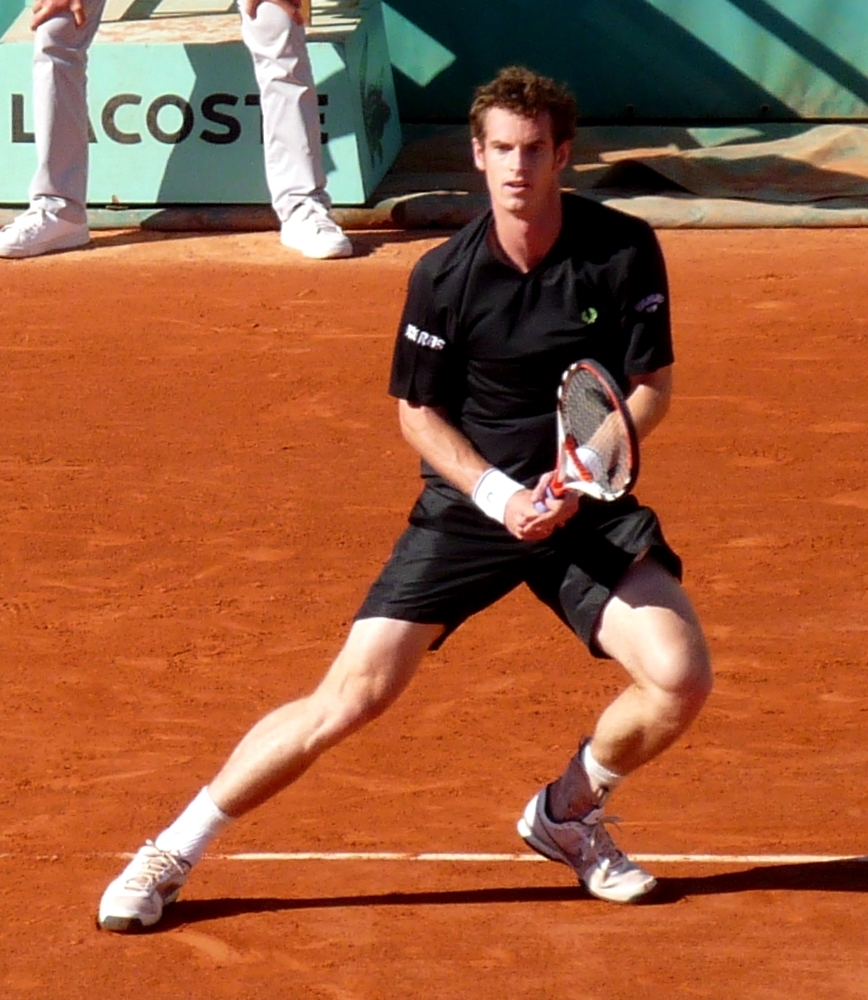
Murray made the quarter-finals of the 2009 French Open

Murray beat No. 9, Nikolay Davydenko at Monte Carlo, the first time he had beaten a top ten player on clay, though he lost to Nadal in the semi-finals. Murray was upset in round two of Rome by qualifier Juan Mónaco, and he reached the quarter-finals of Madrid, losing to Juan Martín del Potro. During this time Murray achieved the highest ever ranking of a British male in the Open Era when he reached the No. 3 ranking on 11 May 2009. Murray reached the quarter-finals of the French Open, but was defeated by Fernando González in four sets.

Murray won a title for the first time on grass at Queen's and became the first British winner of the tournament since 1938. In the final Murray beat James Blake. At Wimbledon, against Stanislas Wawrinka, Murray's fourth round match was the first match to be played entirely under Wimbledon's retractable roof. This also enabled it to be the then latest finishing match ever at Wimbledon, a record he would go on to eclipse three years later. However Murray lost a tight semi-final to Andy Roddick.

At Montreal, he beat del Potro in three sets to take the title and overtook Nadal in the rankings. He held the number two position until the start of the US Open. Murray followed the Masters win playing at the Cincinnati Masters, where he lost to Federer. At the US Open, Murray was hampered by a wrist injury and suffered a straight-sets loss to Marin Čilić. Murray won both his singles matches, and lost at doubles in the Davis Cup against Poland, but then missed six weeks with a wrist injury.

In November, Murray won at Valencia, but bowed out in round two of the Paris Masters. To end the season, Murray did not make it out of the round robin at the World Tour Finals in London. He ended the year ranked 4.

=== 2010s ===
==== 2010: Australian Open final ====
I can cry like Roger, it's just a shame I can't play like him.

— Murray during his runner's up speech at the 2010 Australian Open.

Murray started the year by reaching the final of the Australian Open, where he lost to Roger Federer in straight sets. At the BNP Paribas Open in Indian Wells, Murray lost in the quarter-finals to Robin Söderling in straight sets. Murray then lost his first match at the 2010 Sony Ericsson Open to Mardy Fish, afterwards saying that his mind hadn't been fully on tennis. Murray lost his first match at Monte-Carlo Rolex Masters to Philipp Kohlschreiber. He and Ross Hutchins lost in the doubles to the Bryan brothers on a champions tie-breaker. Murray reached the third round in the Rome Masters, and the quarter-finals at the Madrid Masters, losing both times to David Ferrer.

At the French Open he lost in straight sets to Tomáš Berdych in the fourth round. In London, Murray progressed to the third round, where he lost to Mardy Fish in a tie-breaker for his second defeat by him in the year. At Wimbledon, Murray progressed to the semi-finals, losing to Nadal in straight sets. In July, Murray and his coach Maclagan split, and Murray replaced him with Àlex Corretja.

At 2010 Farmers Classic, Murray lost in the final to Sam Querrey in three sets. In Canada, Murray became the first player since Andre Agassi in 1995 to defend the Canadian Masters. Murray defeated Nadal and then Federer in straight sets, ending his eight-month title drought. At Cincinnati, Murray first complained about the speed of the court, and then in a quarter-final match with Fish, Murray complained that the organisers refused to put the match on later in the day. With temperatures reaching 33 °C in the shade, Murray won the first set in a tie-breaker but began to feel ill due to the heat. He lost the second set, but forced a final-set tie-breaker, before Fish won. After losing to Stanislas Wawrinka in the third round of the US Open, questions about Murray's conditioning arose, as he called the trainer out twice during the match.

At China Open in Beijing, Murray reached the quarter-finals, losing to Ivan Ljubičić. Murray then won the Shanghai Rolex Masters beating Roger Federer in straight sets. He did not drop a set throughout the event. At Valencia he lost in the second round to Juan Mónaco. However, in doubles, Murray partnered his brother Jamie Murray to the final, where they beat Mahesh Bhupathi and Max Mirnyi. The victory was Murray's first doubles title and the second time he had reached a final with his brother.

Murray reached the quarter-finals at the BNP Paribas Masters losing to Gaël Monfils in three sets. At the Tour finals in London, Murray went 2–1 in round robin play before facing Nadal in the semi-final. They battled for over three hours, before Murray fell to the Spaniard in a final-set tie-breaker, bringing an end to his season. He ended the year ranked 4 for the third consecutive year.

==== 2011: Consistency and two more Masters ====
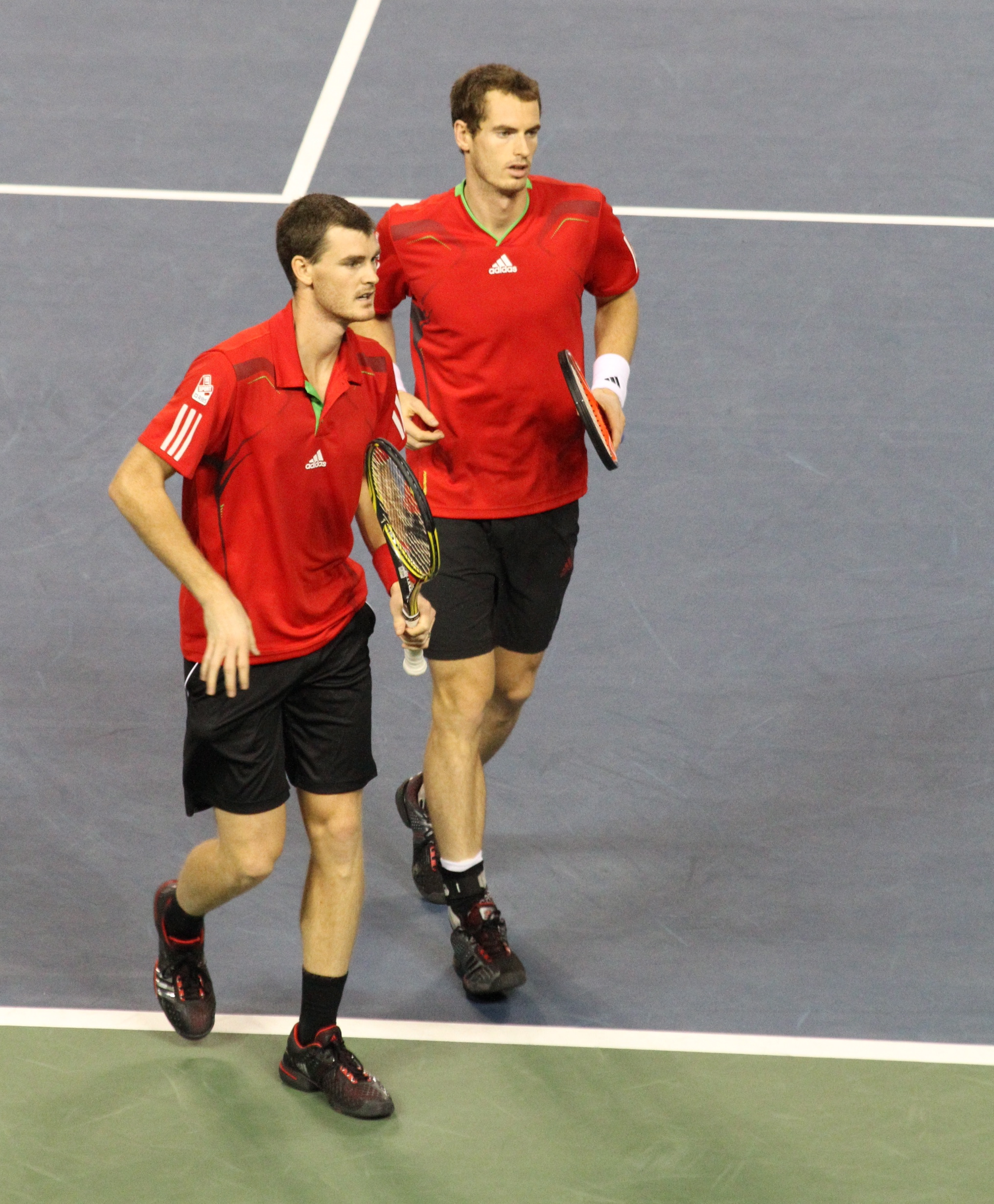
Murray with his brother Jamie (left) at the 2011 Japan Open

At the Australian Open, Murray met former champion Novak Djokovic in the final and was defeated in straight sets. In Rotterdam, he was defeated by Marcos Baghdatis in the first round. Murray reached the semi-finals of the doubles tournament with his brother Jamie. Murray lost to qualifiers in the first rounds at the Masters Series events in Indian Wells and Miami, after which he split with coach Àlex Corretja.

Murray returned to form at Monte Carlo, but lost to Nadal in the semi-finals. Murray sustained an elbow injury before the match and subsequently withdrew from Barcelona due to the injury. Murray lost in the third round at the Mutua Madrileña Madrid Open, but made it to the semi-finals of the Rome Masters, where he lost to Novak Djokovic.

At the French Open, he lost in his first semi-final at Roland Garros, against Rafael Nadal.

Murray defeated Jo-Wilfried Tsonga to win his second Queen's Club title. At Wimbledon, Murray lost in the semi-final to Nadal, despite taking the first set. At the Davis Cup tie between Great Britain and Luxembourg, Murray led the British team to victory. Murray was the two-time defending 2011 Rogers Cup champion, but lost in the second round to South African Kevin Anderson. He won the 2011 Western & Southern Open after Novak Djokovic retired due to injury. At the US Open, Murray battled from two sets down to win a five-set second-round encounter with Robin Haase, but lost in the semi-finals to Rafael Nadal in four sets. This was the first time in his career that Andy had reached the quarter-finals, or better, at all four slams in a calendar year.

Murray won the Thailand Open. At the Japan Open he beat Rafael Nadal for the first time in 2011 in three sets. Murray then won the doubles with his brother Jamie, becoming the first person in the 2011 season to capture both singles and doubles titles at the same tournament. Murray then successfully defended his Shanghai Masters crown with a straight-sets victory over David Ferrer in the final. At the ATP World Tour Finals, Murray lost to David Ferrer in straight sets and withdrew from the tournament after the loss with a groin pull. Murray ended the year ranked 4, behind Djokovic, Nadal, and Federer, for the fourth consecutive year.

==== 2012: Olympic Gold, US Open champion ====
With Ivan Lendl as his new full-time coach, Murray won Brisbane beating Alexandr Dolgopolov in the final. In doubles, he lost in the quarter-finals against Jürgen Melzer and Philipp Petzschner. After an exhibition tournament, Murray reached the semi-finals of the 2012 Australian Open, where he lost to Novak Djokovic in a four-hour-and 50-minute match.

At Dubai, Murray beat Djokovic in the semi-finals, but lost the final to Roger Federer. After an early defeat at the BNP Paribas Open, Murray made the final of the Miami Masters, losing to Djokovic. Murray then had quarter-final losses at the Monte Carlo Masters and Barcelona Open, and a third round loss at the Italian Open. Murray battled back spasms throughout the French Open, and in the quarter-finals, he was beaten by David Ferrer.

Murray lost in the opening round of Queen's to No. 65 Nicolas Mahut. At Wimbledon, Murray set the then record for the latest finish at the championships when he completed a four-set victory over Marcos Baghdatis at 23:02 BST (surpassed by one minute by the 2018 men's singles semi-finals). Murray beat Jo-Wilfried Tsonga in the semi-final in four sets to become the first male British player to reach the Wimbledon final since Bunny Austin in 1938. In the final, he lost to Federer in four sets.

Murray returned to Wimbledon to compete in the London 2012 Summer Olympics. He and brother Jamie Murray lost in round one to Austria (Jürgen Melzer and Alexander Peya) in three sets. In the mixed doubles, Murray and Laura Robson lost in the final to the Belarusian top seeds (Victoria Azarenka and Max Mirnyi) in three sets, gaining a silver medal. In singles, Murray lost only one set and beat Federer in the final for the loss of just 7 games. Murray became the first British man to win the Olympic singles gold medal in tennis since Josiah Ritchie in 1908. Murray retired early in the Rogers Cup due to a knee injury, and was beaten by Jérémy Chardy at Cincinnati in straight sets.

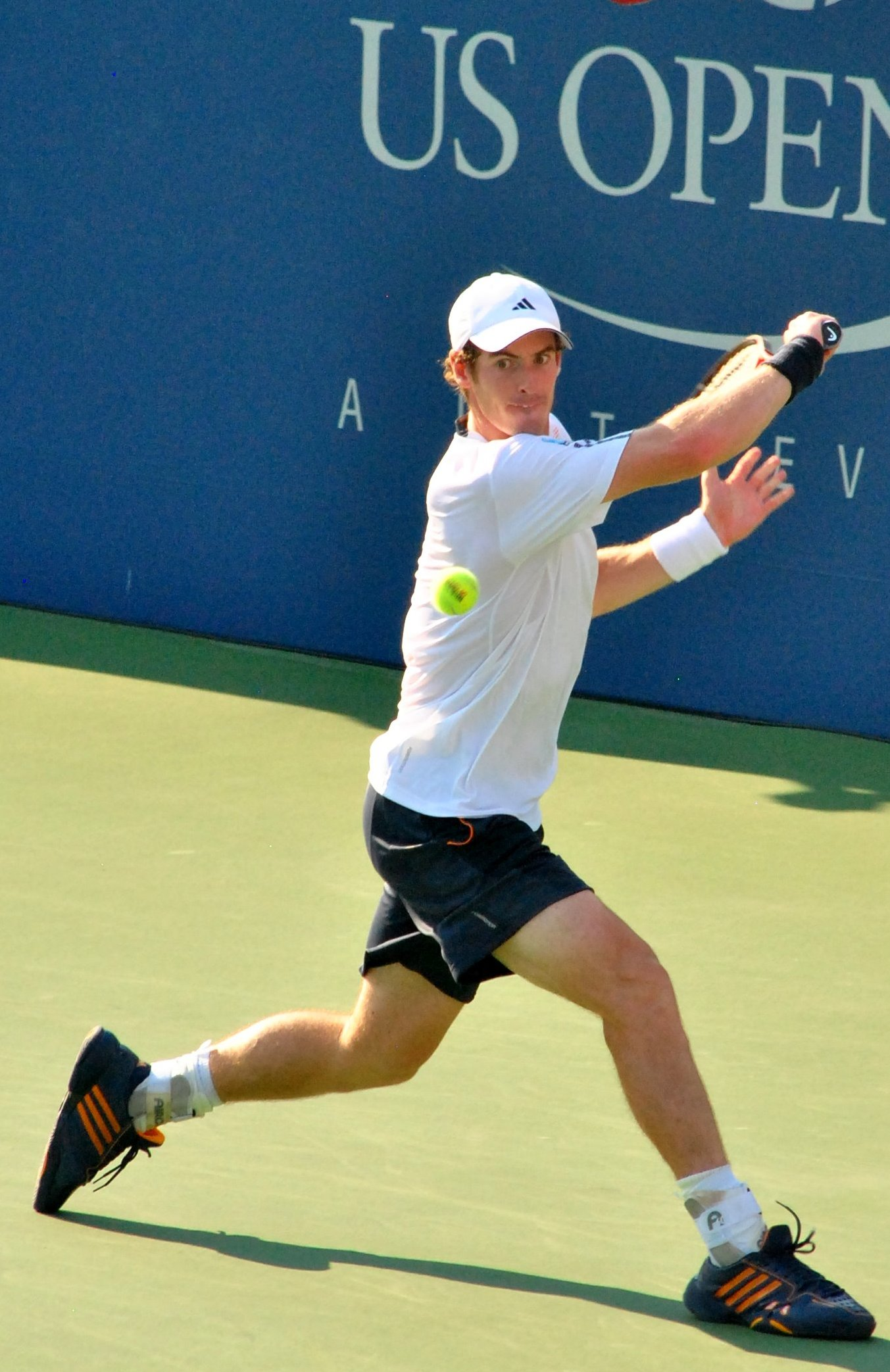
Murray at the 2012 US Open where he won his first major title

At US Open, he beat Milos Raonic in straight sets in round four, and then in the quarter-finals, had to come from a set and two breaks down against Marin Čilić to prevail in four. In the semi-finals, he defeated Tomáš Berdych in almost four hours, to reach his second consecutive Grand Slam final. Murray beat Djokovic in five sets, becoming the first British man to win a Grand Slam final since Fred Perry in 1936, and the first Scottish-born player to win a Grand Slam final since Harold Mahony in 1896. The win would also set several records for Murray: the longest tiebreak in US Open final history at 12–10 in the first set, it made Murray the first man ever to win an Olympic gold medal and the US Open in the same year, and it tied with the 1988 US Open final (in which Murray's coach Lendl competed) as the longest final in the tournament's history. By defeating Djokovic in the final, Murray achieved his 100th Grand Slam career match win. The victory made Murray part of the "Big Four" according to many pundits and contemporaries, including Novak Djokovic.

Murray lost in the semi-finals of the Japan Open to Milos Raonic in three sets. In the doubles he and his brother Jamie lost in the quarter-finals to Leander Paes and Radek Štěpánek. At Shanghai, Murray beat Roger Federer in the semi-finals in straight sets. After failing to capitalise on five match points, Murray eventually lost the final to Djokovic in three sets, bringing to an end his 12–0 winning streak at the competition. When Nadal pulled out of both the Paris Masters and the year-end championships, Murray finished the year at No. 3. At the BBC Sports Personality of the Year Murray was voted third, ahead of Mo Farah. Murray won the World Breakthrough of the Year at the Laureus World Sports Awards.

Murray was appointed Officer of the Order of the British Empire (OBE) in the 2013 New Year Honours for services to tennis.

==== 2013: Wimbledon champion and back surgery ====
Murray won Brisbane beating Grigor Dimitrov in the final in straight sets. At the Australian Open he prevailed in 5 sets against Federer in the semis (his first Grand Slam win over Roger). With this victory, each member of the Big Four (Federer, Nadal, Djokovic and Murray) had beaten the other three at the majors. Murray was eventually defeated in four sets by Djokovic. Murray became only the second man in the Open Era to achieve three runner-up finishes at the Australian Open, the other being Stefan Edberg.

At Indian Wells, Murray lost in the quarter-finals to Juan Martín del Potro in three sets. In the Miami final against David Ferrer, Murray faced match point in the decider at 5–6, but won on a third-set tiebreaker to win his second Miami Masters title, and overtook Roger Federer into second place in the rankings, ending a near-decade long time period in which either Federer or Rafael Nadal were ranked in the top two. Murray briefly fell back to No. 3, following a third round defeat by Stanislas Wawrinka in Monte-Carlo, but soon reclaimed the No. 2 ranking. Murray lost in the quarter-finals in Madrid to Tomáš Berdych in straight sets.

At Rome, Murray retired due to a hip injury during his second round match against Marcel Granollers on his 26th birthday. This left Murray with only eleven days to be fit for the start of the French Open.

Murray withdrew from Roland Garros with a back injury. He made his comeback at Queen's, where he came from behind to beat Marin Čilić in three sets to claim his third title at Queen's Club.

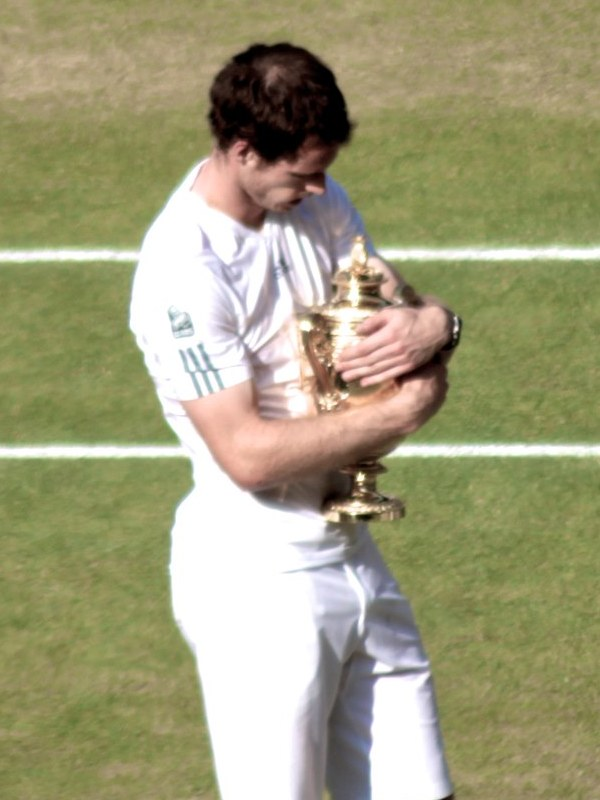
Murray holds the Wimbledon trophy following his victory in the 2013 men's final

Going into Wimbledon, Murray had not lost a match on grass since the previous year's final. Murray made it through to his tenth consecutive Grand Slam quarter-final. For the seventh time in his career, Murray had to come back from a deficit of two sets to come through in five sets against Fernando Verdasco, then beat 24th seed Jerzy Janowicz in four sets (dropping the first) to make it through to his second consecutive Wimbledon final, and third consecutive major final against Novak Djokovic.

Despite the Serb being the favourite to win the title throughout the Championships, Murray overcame Djokovic in a straight sets match that lasted over three hours, to become the first British winner of the men's singles title since Fred Perry in 1936 and to extend his winning streak on grass to 18 matches.

At the US Open, Murray entered a Grand Slam tournament as defending champion for the first time and reached the quarter-finals at a major for the 11th straight tournament. In the last 8, Murray lost to Stanislas Wawrinka in straight sets, ending Murray's streak of four consecutive major finals. The Great Britain Davis Cup team played their World Group Play-off tie on clay against Croatia, where Murray beat 16-year-old Borna Ćorić in straight sets. He and Colin Fleming beat Ivan Dodig and Mate Pavić in the doubles, and Murray then sealed Britain's return to the World Group by defeating Dodig in straight sets.

Following the Davis Cup, Murray's season was cut short by his decision to undergo surgery, in order to sort out the lower back problems that had caused him problems since the early stages of the previous season. Following the conclusion of the 2013 season, Murray was voted the 2013 BBC Sports Personality of the Year.

==== 2014: 30th career title and out of top 10 ====
At Qatar Murray beat Mousa Shanan Zayed in straight sets in 37 minutes without dropping a game, but was defeated in three sets by No. 40 Florian Mayer in the second round, despite being a set and a break up.

At Australian Open, Murray went out in four sets in the quarters to Roger Federer, ending his streak of four consecutive Australian Open semi-finals. As a result of losing before the final, Murray fell to No. 6, falling out of the top 5 for the first time since 2008.

In the Davis Cup World Group first round Great Britain faced United States. Murray won both of his ties against Donald Young and Sam Querrey, helping Britain to their first Davis Cup quarter-final since 1986. Murray lost in the quarter finals of Rotterdam, to Marin Čilić and the semis of Mexican Open in Acapulco, to Grigor Dimitrov (in a three-setter).

At Indian Wells, Murray lost in round four to Milos Raonic in three sets. Murray and Jonathan Marray lost in round two of the doubles to Alexander Peya and Bruno Soares. Murray split with coach Ivan Lendl. At Miami, Murray lost to Djokovic in the quarter-finals. In the Davis Cup quarter-finals against Italy, he beat Andreas Seppi, he and Colin Fleming won the doubles and he lost to Fabio Fognini in straight sets (Great Britain lost the deciding final rubber).

At Madrid after his opening win over Nicolas Almagro, he dedicated the victory to former player Elena Baltacha. He then lost to qualifier Santiago Giraldo in the next round. Murray then reached the quarter-finals of Rome where he lost to No. 1 Rafael Nadal in a tight match in which he had been up a break in the final set. At the French Open, Murray edged out 28th seed Philipp Kohlschreiber 12–10 in the final set in round three (the first time Murray had ever gone beyond 7–5 in a deciding set). He then beat Fernando Verdasco and Gaël Monfils in a five set quarter-final, which saw Murray rise to No. 5 and equal his best ever French Open by reaching the semi-finals. He lost to Nadal in straight sets, winning only 6 games. Murray then appointed former women's world No. 1, and two-times slam titlist, Amélie Mauresmo as his coach in a 'historic move' which made Mauresmo the first woman to coach a top male tennis player.

At Wimbledon Grigor Dimitrov ended his 17 match winning-streak on Wimbledon grass (including the 2012 Olympics) with a straight sets win in the quarter finals, meaning Murray failed to reach the semi-finals for the first time since 2008. After his defeat at the Championships, Murray dropped to No. 10, his lowest ranking since 2008.

Murray reached back-to-back quarter-finals at the Canadian Open and Cincinnati Masters, losing to eventual champions Jo Wilfried Tsonga, after being a break up in the decider, and Roger Federer, after being two breaks up in the second set, respectively. He made it to the quarter-finals of the 2014 US Open, losing to Novak Djokovic, after earning his first top ten win of the year in the previous round against Jo Wilfried Tsonga. This was the first season since 2009 where Murray failed to reach a grand slam final. As a consequence Murray fell outside of the top 10 rankings for the first time since June 2008.

At Shenzhen Open Murray reached his first final of the season, breaking a drought of 14 months. In the final, after saving five championship points in the second set tie break against Tommy Robredo, Murray won the title in three sets, Robredo's drop in fitness ultimately proving decisive. At Beijing, he reached the semi-finals before losing to Djokovic in straight sets. He lost in the third round at the Shanghai Masters to David Ferrer despite being a set up. In Vienna he beat Ferrer in three sets for his second title of the season, and the 30th of his career. Murray defeated Ferrer again in the semi-finals of Valencia to move into his third final in five weeks. In a repeat of the Shenzhen Open final, Murray again saved five championship points as he overcame Tommy Robredo in three sets. Murray then reached the quarter-finals of the Paris Masters, where he lost to Djokovic in his 23rd match in 37 days. However, his win over Dimitrov in the third round had already guaranteed him a spot at the ATP World Tour Finals.

At the ATP World Tour Finals, Murray lost his opening round robin match to Kei Nishikori but won his second match against Milos Raonic. He lost his final group match against Federer in straight sets and only won one game against him, marking his worst defeat since losing to Djokovic in the 2007 Miami Masters, eliminating him from the tournament.

At the end of the season, Murray mutually agreed on a split with training partner Dani Vallverdu and fitness coach Jez Green.

==== 2015: Davis Cup champion, world No. 2 ====
At the Australian Open he beat Nick Kyrgios and Tomáš Berdych to reach his fourth final at the tournament (three of which were against Djokovic) and the eighth grand slam final of his career. He lost the final to Novak Djokovic in four sets, but returned to the top four in the world rankings for the first time in 12 months.

At Rotterdam Murray lost in the quarter-finals to Gilles Simon. At Dubai he lost in the quarters to 18-year-old Borna Ćorić. At Davis Cup World Group in Glasgow against the United States he won both his matches against Donald Young and John Isner, allowing Great Britain to progress to the quarter-finals 3–2.

Murray then reached the semi-finals of Indian Wells, overtaking Tim Henman's record of 496 career wins to have the most career wins for a British man in the Open Era. However, he suffered a 6th consecutive defeat to Djokovic in straight sets. Murray then reached the final of Miami, recording his 500th career win. He lost the final to Djokovic in three sets. Murray added Jonas Björkman to his coaching staff in March initially on a five-week trial.

Murray won his first ATP clay court title at the 2015 BMW Open, defeating Philipp Kohlschreiber to become the first Briton since Buster Mottram in 1976 to win a tour level clay court event. At Madrid he beat Rafael Nadal in straight sets in the final for his first ever clay court Masters title. The win was Murray's first over Nadal, Federer or Djokovic since Wimbledon 2013, and his first over Nadal on clay.

At Italian Open, he withdrew due to fatigue. Murray then reached his third semi-final at the French Open, losing to Djokovic in five sets and ending his 15 match winning streak on clay. To start his grass court campaign, Murray went on to win a record-tying fourth Queen's Club title, defeating the big serving Kevin Anderson in straight sets in the final. At the 2015 Wimbledon Championships, Murray dropped only two sets before a semi-final clash with Roger Federer which he lost in straight sets, gaining only one break point in the match.

In Great Britain's Davis Cup quarter-final tie against France at Queen's, Murray beat Jo-Wilfried Tsonga and then he and his brother Jamie won the doubles, beating Tsonga and Nicolas Mahut in four sets. He then beat Simon in the fourth rubber in four sets, which resulted in Great Britain reaching their first Davis Cup semi-final since 1981.

At Citi Open, he lost his first match, losing to No. 53 Teymuraz Gabashvili in a final set tiebreak, despite serving for the match. In doubles, he partnered Daniel Nestor, losing in the first round to the fourth seeds, Rohan Bopanna and Florin Mergea, in three sets.

Murray won Montreal, beating Tsonga and Nishikori in the quarter-finals and semi-finals. He then won the final against Djokovic in three sets. This broke his eight-match, two-year losing streak against Djokovic. He also overtook Federer to become the world No. 2. In doubles, he and Leander Paes beat Chardy and Anderson, before losing to Murray's brother Jamie and John Peers in two sets – the first time the Murray brothers had competed against each other in a tour-level match.

At Cincinnati, Murray lost to defending champion Roger Federer in straight sets, and after Federer went on to win the tournament, this result saw Murray return to the No. 3 ranking. At the US Open, Murray beat Nick Kyrgios in four sets and Adrian Mannarino in five sets after being two sets down, equaling Federer for winning eight matches from two sets to love down. He then beat Thomaz Bellucci in straight sets but lost in the fourth round to Kevin Anderson in four sets. This ended Murray's five-year run of 18 consecutive Grand Slam quarter-finals (not counting his withdrawal from the 2013 French Open) since his third round loss to Stan Wawrinka in the 2010 US Open.

Facing Australia in the semi-finals of the Davis Cup World Group in Glasgow, Murray won both his singles rubbers in straight sets, against Thanasi Kokkinakis and Bernard Tomic. He and his brother Jamie won in five sets against Sam Groth and Lleyton Hewitt, the results guiding Great Britain to the Davis Cup final for the first time since 1978 with a 3–2 win over Australia.

After losing in the semi-finals of the Shanghai Masters to Djokovic in straight sets, Murray reached the finals of the Paris Masters. After a three set win over Richard Gasquet, he joined Novak Djokovic, Roger Federer and Rafael Nadal as the only players to reach the semi-finals (or better) at all nine of the ATP World Tour Masters 1000 tournaments, and also ensured that he compiled his best match record in a single season. He lost the final to Djokovic in straight sets.

At ATP World Tour Finals, Murray went out in the round-robin stage, after defeating David Ferrer and losing to Rafael Nadal and Stan Wawrinka. However, after Federer failed to win the tournament, he finished the season ranked No. 2 for the first time.

In the Davis Cup final, Murray beat Ruben Bemelmans in straight sets, played on indoor clay courts at Ghent. With brother Jamie he won in four sets over Steve Darcis and David Goffin, and then Murray beat Goffin to ensure a 3–1 victory for Great Britain, their first Davis Cup title since 1936 and their tenth overall. Murray also became only the third person since the current Davis Cup format was introduced to win all eight of his singles rubbers in a Davis Cup season, after John McEnroe and Mats Wilander.

==== 2016: Wimbledon title, Olympic gold, No. 1 ====
At Australian Open he reached his fifth Australian Open final beating Milos Raonic in the semis, but lost in the final to Novak Djokovic in straight sets. He became the second man in the Open Era (after Ivan Lendl) to lose five Grand Slam finals at one event, and the only one not to have won the title. In February, Murray appointed Jamie Delgado as an assistant coach. Murray then played at 2016 Davis Cup defeating the Japanese Taro Daniel and Kei Nishikori in the first round. At 2016 Indian Wells Masters he lost to Federico Delbonis in the third round. At Miami he lost to Grigor Dimitrov in the third round.

At Monte Carlo Murray lost in the semi finals to eventual champion Rafael Nadal despite winning the first set. At 2016 Mutua Madrid Open Murray beat Rafael Nadal. In the final he lost to Novak Djokovic in three sets. This loss dropped Murray from second to third in the ATP rankings. Shortly afterwards Mauresmo and Murray issued a joint statement announcing that they had "mutually agreed" to end their coaching partnership.

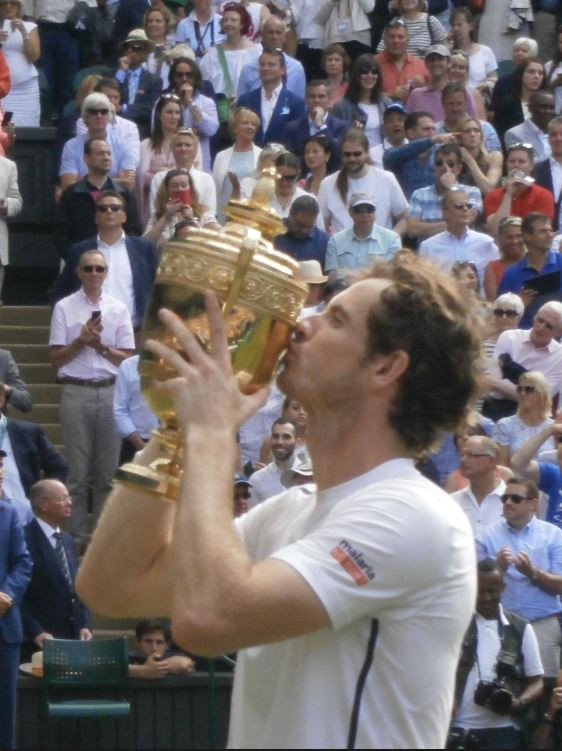
In 2016, Murray won his second Wimbledon title, beating Milos Raonic in the final

Murray regained his number two ranking after he won the 2016 Internazionali BNL d'Italia for his 1st title of the season and 36th overall. He beat Djokovic in straight sets. This was his first win over Djokovic on clay and became the first British player since Virginia Wade in 1971 to win the title and the first British man since George Patrick Hughes in 1931. At French Open he beat Richard Gasquet in four sets to set up a semi-final clash against defending champion Stanislas Wawrinka. Murray defeated Wawrinka in four sets to become the first male British player since Bunny Austin in 1937, to reach a French Open final. He lost to Djokovic in four sets.

In June Ivan Lendl returned to his former role as Murray's coach. At Queen's in the final he was down a set and a break to Milos Raonic, but he won a record 5th Queen's Club Championships. At the 2016 Wimbledon Championships Murray beat 12th seed Jo-Wilfried Tsonga in five sets in the quarter-final and 10th seed Tomáš Berdych in straight sets to reach his third straight major final. In the final on 10 July, Murray defeated Raonic in straight sets to win his second Wimbledon title and third major title overall. His Wimbledon crown was his 3rd title of the season and 38th career Tour title.

At Rio Olympic Games he became the first player, male or female, to win two consecutive gold medals in the tennis singles events by beating Juan Martín del Potro in the final, which lasted over four hours. Murray then entered the US Open and lost to sixth seed Kei Nishikori in five sets despite holding a two sets to one lead.

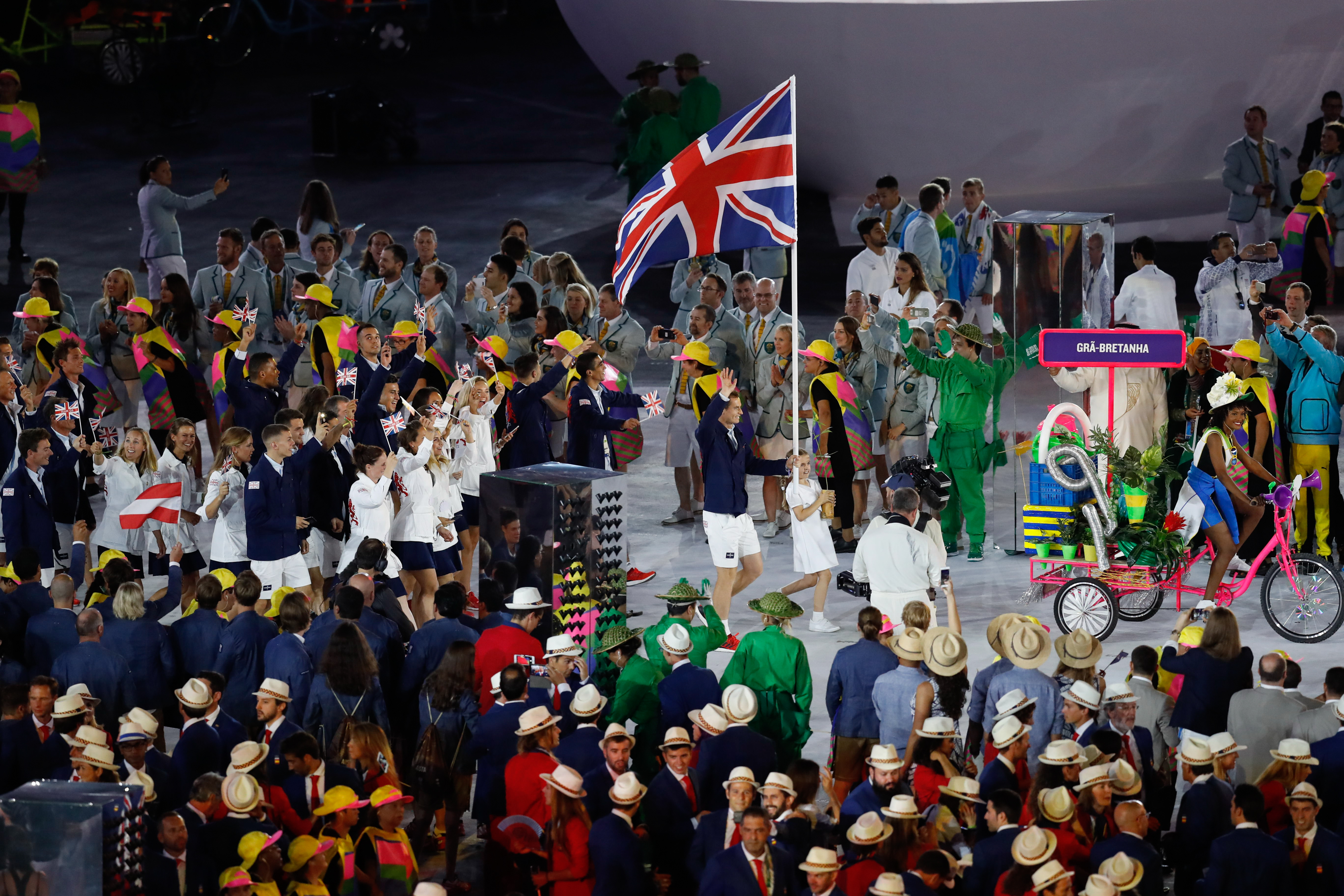
Murray carrying the flag on behalf of athletes from Great Britain during the parade of nations at the 2016 Summer Olympics opening ceremony

At Davis Cup semi-final in Glasgow against Argentina he lost to Juan Martín del Potro in five sets and he and his brother Jamie beat del Potro and Leonardo Mayer in four sets. He then beat Guido Pella in straight sets, though Great Britain lost the tie. Murray then won the China Open for his fifth title of 2016 and 40th career tour title. He defeated Grigor Dimitrov in straight sets. Murray then won Shanghai defeating Roberto Bautista Agut in straight sets.

Murray brought his win streak to 15 consecutive match wins by winning the Erste Bank Open for his seventh tour title of the 2016 season. He beat Jo-Wilfried Tsonga, for his third title in succession. The result saw Murray win seven titles in a single season for the first time in his career, and move to solo 15th on the all-time list of singles titles in the Open Era, breaking a tie with former world No. 1 Stefan Edberg.

Murray entered the Paris Masters knowing that in the event of Djokovic not reaching the final, winning the title would be enough to see him crowned world No. 1 for the first time. Djokovic lost to Marin Cilic and Raonic withdrew before the start of their semi final match, giving Murray a walkover. As a result, Murray became the first British man to reach No. 1 since the introduction of the rankings in 1973. Murray then defeated John Isner in the final in three sets to win his fourth consecutive tournament and first Paris Masters title. In November 2016, Murray reached the final of the ATP World Tour Finals for the first time before winning against Novak Djokovic in two sets, thus reaching year-end No. 1 and in doing so, became the first man to win ¹ a Grand Slam, ² the ATP World Tour Finals, ³ the gold medal in singles at the Olympic Games, ⁴ a Masters 1000 title, and ⁵ hold the world No.1-ranking in the same calendar year. The International Tennis Federation recognised Murray as their men's 2016 ITF men's world champion, the first time Murray had achieved this honour.

==== 2017: Injury and hiatus ====
Murray was knighted in the 2017 New Year Honours for services to tennis and charity, making him the UK's youngest knight, at 29. Murray reached the final of the Qatar Open, but lost to Novak Djokovic in three sets despite saving three championship points. At the 2017 Australian Open he lost in the fourth round against Mischa Zverev in four sets.

At Dubai he won his only tournament of the year, beating Fernando Verdasco in straight sets, despite almost losing in the quarter-finals to Philipp Kohlschreiber where Murray had to save seven match points. The next week, he suffered a shock defeat in the second round of the Indian Wells Masters to Vasek Pospisil.

After missing a month due to an elbow injury, Murray returned to compete in the Monte-Carlo Masters in April, losing out in the third round to Albert Ramos-Vinolas. He then competed in Barcelona where he was beaten by Dominic Thiem in the semi-finals. Murray lost to Borna Coric in the third round of Madrid, and to Fabio Fognini in second round of Rome. In the 2017 French Open quarter-finals he beat Kei Nishikori in four sets, but lost in the semi-finals to Stan Wawrinka in five sets.

As the five-time champion at Queens, Murray pledged his prize money to the victims of the Grenfell Tower fire, however he was defeated in straight sets by Jordan Thompson in the first round. Despite concerns over a lingering hip injury, he returned to Wimbledon as the defending champion and was defeated in the quarter-final by Sam Querrey in five sets.

Murray missed the Canadian Open and the Cincinnati Masters due to his hip injury, which led to him losing his No. 1 ranking to Rafael Nadal. His injury then forced him to withdraw from the US Open and he did not play again in 2017. As a result of his inactivity, his ranking fell sharply to No. 16, his lowest ranking since May 2008. Murray returned to the court to play a charity match against Federer in Glasgow and expressed his hope to return to the tour in Brisbane. The following week, he and Ivan Lendl announced that they had mutually ended their coaching arrangement for a second time.

==== 2018: Hip surgery, return to tour ====
In March, Murray lost his British No. 1 ranking for the first time since 2006, to Kyle Edmund. Later that month, Murray said he was making progress after several days of playing at the Mouratoglou Tennis Academy in Nice after posting pictures of himself practising against Aidan McHugh, a British junior player, on Instagram. He then announced he would play his first ATP tournament since hip surgery at the Rosmalen Grass Court Championships in June, although he later withdrew saying he was not quite ready and wanted to be 100%. He returned at Queen's and lost to Nick Kyrgios in the first round in three sets. He was given a wildcard for the Eastbourne International, where he beat Stan Wawrinka in the first round before losing to Kyle Edmund in the second. He withdrew from Wimbledon with a "heavy heart" a day before the tournament, saying it was too soon to play five-set matches. As a result of this withdrawal, he dropped to 839th in the ATP rankings, his newest low ranking since he first entered the ATP rankings on 21 July 2003.

At Washington, a three-set victory over Marius Copil in the third round lasted until just past 3:00 AM local time; Murray wept after the conclusion of the match, overcome with emotion. He then withdrew from the tournament and the Canadian Open the following week to continue his recovery and to focus on the Cincinnati Masters for which he was awarded a wildcard. He lost in the first round to Lucas Pouille in three sets.

Murray made his grand slam return at the US Open where he beat James Duckworth in four sets. However, he was unable to progress further, losing in the second round to Spain's Fernando Verdasco in four sets.

He entered the Shenzhen Open as a wildcard and beat Zhizhen Zhang and David Goffin. He lost to Fernando Verdasco in the quarter-finals in straight sets. Murray had been due to play at the China Open the following week, but, after suffering a slight ankle problem, he decided to end his season early to ensure he would be fit for the following year.

==== 2019: Surgery, first title in two years ====
At Brisbane he won his first round match against James Duckworth in straight sets but admitted post-match that he did not know how long he would be able to play top-class tennis. Murray was defeated in the next round by Daniil Medvedev.

On 11 January, at a press conference just before the 2019 Australian Open, an emotional Murray announced that he could possibly retire from professional tennis due to struggling physically for a "long time", particularly with his hip injury. He said that he had been suffering with hip pain on a daily basis, and that it caused him to struggle with tasks like putting his shoes and socks on. He said that the Australian Open could be his final tournament, stating: "I'm not sure I can play through the pain for another four or five months". Active and retired tennis players, including Juan Martín del Potro, Kyle Edmund, Billie Jean King and the other members of the 'Big Four' paid tribute to Murray upon his announcement.

At the Australian Open Murray lost his opening match against 22nd seed Roberto Bautista Agut in a four-hour, five-setter. At its conclusion, a video montage of tributes featuring other top players Roger Federer, Novak Djokovic, Sloane Stephens and Caroline Wozniacki played in deference to his impending retirement. In his post-match interview, he stated that he was considering a second hip surgery, and had not yet ruled out a return to the sport upon recovering from the operation.

Bob Bryan urged Murray to have the "Birmingham hip resurfacing (BHR)" operation he underwent in August 2018, involving a cobalt-chrome metal cap being placed over the femur with a matching metal cup in the acetabulum (a conservative bone-saving alternative to a traditional Total Hip Replacement). Bryan informed Murray that the BHR would improve his quality of life and may help him return to the professional tennis tour. On 29 January, Murray announced on Instagram that he had undergone hip resurfacing surgery in London and hoped that it would "be the end of my hip pain". On 7 March, Murray stated in an interview that he was now free of pain in his hip as a result of the surgery and may return to playing competitive tennis, but that he would not rush his comeback.

On 16 May 2019, Murray received his knighthood from Prince Charles at Buckingham Palace, two years after he was awarded the honour.

Murray returned to the professional tennis circuit in June, entering the doubles at Queen's Club Championships alongside Feliciano Lopez. They beat top seeds Juan Sebastián Cabal and Robert Farah in straight sets and defending champions John Peers and Henri Kontinen in the semi-finals. They beat Rajeev Ram and Joe Salisbury in the final. Following the win, Murray stated that his "hip felt great" and that "there was no pain." At Wimbledon men's doubles he and Pierre-Hugues Herbert were eliminated in the second round, while Murray and Serena Williams lost in the third round of mixed doubles to Bruno Soares and Nicole Melichar.

In his first singles match since the Australian Open, Murray lost to Richard Gasquet in the first round Cincinnati in straight sets. In the quarter-final of the Cincinnati doubles, Murray and Feliciano López met Jamie Murray and Neal Skupski in only the second match between the siblings in their senior careers; Jamie and Skupski won in three sets to progress, with Andy stating afterwards that he would now concentrate his efforts on returning to the singles tour. At 2019 Winston-Salem Open, he lost to Tennys Sandgren in the first round. Murray played the 2019 Rafa Nadal Open Banc Sabadell Challenger, the first time he had competed on the Challenger Tour since 2005. In the first round of the event, Murray defeated Imran Sibille to record his first singles victory since his hip surgery. He lost to Matteo Viola in the third round.

Murray won the European Open, beating Stan Wawrinka in the final. In November 2019, he represented Great Britain for the first time since 2016, however, he was only able to play one rubber in Great Britain's run to the Davis Cup semi-finals.

At the end of November, a television documentary, Andy Murray: Resurfacing, was released on the Amazon Prime platform, detailing Murray's various attempts to overcome his hip injury.

=== 2020s ===
==== 2020: First top 10 win in three years ====
Due to the COVID-19 pandemic, numerous tournaments on the 2020 ATP Tour were either cancelled or rescheduled for later in the year. Murray's first ATP tournament of 2020 was at the Western & Southern Open in August in which he entered as a wildcard. He beat world No. 7 Alexander Zverev in the second round, his first victory over a top-10 player in over three years. He lost his third round match to Milos Raonic in straight sets.

In his first round match at the spectator-less US Open Murray came back from two down to narrowly defeat Yoshihito Nishioka in five sets. In the second round he lost in straight sets to the 15th seed Felix Auger-Aliassime.

He then entered the French Open as a wildcard but was defeated in the first round in straight sets by Stan Wawrinka.

Murray's last tournament of the year was the Bett1Hulks Indoors where he received a wildcard and lost in the first round to Fernando Verdasco in straight sets.

==== 2021: Wimbledon third round ====
Murray's first tournament of the season was the 2021 Open Sud de France where, as a wildcard, he lost in the first round. In March, he competed at the 2021 ABN AMRO World Tennis Tournament in Rotterdam as a wildcard where he lost in the second round against Andrey Rublev.

Murray was largely inactive during the next three months due to a groin injury. He returned to singles play as a wildcard at the Queen's Club Championships where he lost to Matteo Berrettini in straight sets. At Wimbledon he received a wildcard. He lost in the third round to Denis Shapovalov.

Having withdrawn from singles due to quadriceps strain, at Olympic men's doubles Murray and Joe Salisbury reached the quarter-finals beating Nicolas Mahut and Pierre-Hugues Herbert and Kevin Krawietz and Tim Pütz before losing to Marin Čilić and Ivan Dodig.

As a wild card at the 2021 Western & Southern Open, Murray lost to Hubert Hurkacz in the second round. At the 2021 Winston-Salem Open, Murray entered as a wildcard again and won in straight sets against Noah Rubin, before losing to Frances Tiafoe. At the US Open, he lost to Stefanos Tsitsipas in five sets in the first round. The match was controversial, with Murray accusing Tsitsipas of cheating, in reference to an eight-minute bathroom break that Tsitsipas had during the match.

Murray reached the quarterfinal of the Moselle Open as a wildcard losing to Hubert Hurkacz. Murray lost as a wildcard in the round of 16 to the 2nd seed and eventual champion Casper Ruud at the 2021 San Diego Open. He received another wildcard for Indian Wells, where he reached the third round and was beaten by Alexander Zverev. He then reached the second round of the European Open as a wildcard after a 3-hour and 45 minute marathon win against Frances Tiafoe. He lost in the second round to Diego Schwartzman in straight sets. At the Vienna Open, Murray entered as a wildcard and upset world No. 10 Hubert Hurkacz in the first round in three sets to claim his first top 10 victory of the year, but fell in straight sets to Carlos Alcaraz the following round. At the 2021 Stockholm Open, he reached the quarterfinals as a wildcard, defeating World No. 10 Jannik Sinner for his second top 10 win in two weeks and for the season and the 104th in his career.

==== 2022: First ATP final since 2019 ====
"Lots of people told me I wouldn't be able to play again, and lots of people told me I'd be able to hit tennis balls but not compete professionally again. That was nonsense, and I want to see how close I can get back to the top of the game."

— Murray, opening up about his struggles and recovery.

After a first round loss as a wildcard at the Melbourne Summer Set to Facundo Bagnis, Murray reached the final as a wildcard at the Sydney Tennis Classic, losing to Aslan Karatsev.

At the 2022 Australian Open (as a wildcard) Murray lost in the second round in straight sets to Taro Daniel.

He ended his trial period with new coach Jan de Witt and received a wildcard to play Rotterdam. He lost to Félix Auger-Aliassime in the second round. He also hired Dani Vallverdu as his replacement coach. Murray entered the Qatar Open as a wildcard, and lost to Roberto Bautista Agut 6–0 6–1, being served a bagel for the first time since his loss to Novak Djokovic at the 2015 Miami Open final.

At Dubai as a wildcard, he lost to Jannik Sinner in straight sets. After his stint with Vallverdu ended, Murray re-hired Ivan Lendl as his coach, who he had worked with twice before. At Indian Wells as a wildcard, he beat Taro Daniel in three sets, marking his 700th tour win, but he lost in the second round to Alexander Bublik in straight sets. At Miami as a wildcard, Murray lost in straight sets to world No. 2 Daniil Medvedev in the second round.

At Madrid in April he beat Dominic Thiem and Denis Shapovalov. He was due to face Novak Djokovic, which would have marked their first match in five years. However, Murray ultimately withdrew from the match due to a stomach illness, giving Djokovic a walkover.

At Stuttgart, Murray won his first match against a top 5 player since 2016 by beating top seed and world No. 5 Stefanos Tsitsipas in straight sets. He then beat Nick Kyrgios in straight sets to reach the final, where he lost to Matteo Berrettini in three sets. As a result, Murray's ranking rose to No. 47, entering the top 50 for the first time since 2018.

At Wimbledon, Murray lost in the second round to 20th seed John Isner. At Hall of Fame Open he reached the quarterfinal before losing to the third seed, Alexander Bublik.

Murray had a first-round loss at the Citi Open to Mikael Ymer, as well as a first-round loss to Taylor Fritz, at the Canadian Open as a wildcard. At Cincinnati, he lost in the second round to Cameron Norrie.

At the 2022 US Open he lost in the third round to Matteo Berrettini.

==== 2023: Three Challenger titles ====
At the 2023 Australian Open, Murray beat Matteo Berrettini in his first round match. His second round match against Thanasi Kokkinakis lasted 5 hours and 45 minutes, the longest in Murray's career up until this point and the second longest in the tournament history. He lost to 24th seed Roberto Bautista Agut in the third round.

He received wildcards for the 2023 Qatar ExxonMobil Open in Doha, in which he reached the final but was defeated by Daniil Medvedev in straight sets, and the 2023 Dubai Tennis Championships equaling the record of 53, for most wildcards received for a player since 1990, of former player Tommy Haas, who retired in 2017. At the Indian Wells Masters and Miami Open, Murray lost in the third and first rounds, respectively.

In his European clay court season, Murray lost in the first rounds at the Monte-Carlo Masters and Madrid Masters. He next played the Aix-en-Provence Challenger in France, where he defeated first seed Tommy Paul in the final in three sets to clinch his first title since 2019. However, he withdrew from the French Open to begin his preparations for the grass season.

Murray began his grass court season with the 2023 Surbiton Trophy Challenger 125 as a wildcard, where he clinched his second title of the season after defeating Jurij Rodionov in the final. His winning streak continued at the 2023 Nottingham Open, another home Challenger 125, where he won the final, beating Arthur Cazaux.

At Wimbledon, he lost in the second round to Stefanos Tsitsipas and at the US Open, he lost at the same stage to Grigor Dimitrov.

==== 2024: Retirement, coaching Novak Djokovic ====
At the 2024 Australian Open, Murray lost in the first round to Tomás Martín Etcheverry. At the 2024 Dubai Tennis Championships he recorded his 500th hardcourt win over Denis Shapovalov. Murray ruptured ligaments in his left ankle during his third-round defeat to Tomas Machac at the Miami Open in March. He opted against having surgery and returned to action in May at an ATP Challenger event in Bordeaux, France, where he lost his second-round match to Gregoire Barrere in straight sets. At the French Open, Murray lost in the first round to Stanislas Wawrinka.

At Queen's where he also received a wildcard, Murray played the 1000th match of his career, with a win over Alexei Popyrin in three sets. He joined Djokovic, Nadal, Fernando Verdasco and Richard Gasquet as the fifth active player to complete the milestone. However, he suffered yet another injury setback as he had on-court treatment to his back and hip before retiring during the first set of his second round match against Jordan Thompson, which ended up being the last professional singles match of his career.

Murray pulled out of the singles event at the 2024 Wimbledon Championships on the day he was supposed to play his first round match against Tomáš Macháč. This was due to the back injury he sustained at Queen's. Instead, he played in doubles with brother Jamie Murray and was set to play in the mixed doubles with fellow Brit and former US Open champion Emma Raducanu before the latter withdrew due to a wrist injury, thus making the former his last ever Wimbledon match as a professional. On 23 July 2024, Murray announced that he would retire from active professional tennis after the 2024 Paris Olympics, concluding a career spanning nearly two decades. Subsequently, he withdrew from the singles event in the Olympics, deciding to participate only in the doubles event with Dan Evans. He made it to the quarterfinals before losing to third seeds Americans Taylor Fritz and Tommy Paul and officially ended his professional career in August 2024.

Since his retirement, Murray has taken up golf and participated in the BTJA Mike Dickson Golf Day in October 2024, where he picked up his first golf trophy.

==== 2025: Post-retirement & business career ====
Following the ending of his coaching relationship with Djokovic, Murray announced he intends to focus on building his career in business. In May 2025, it was announced Murray joined Redrice Ventures, a venture capital company, as an associate partner.

== Rivalries ==
=== Murray vs. Djokovic ===
Novak Djokovic and Murray met 36 times with Djokovic leading 25–11. Djokovic leads 5–1 on clay, 20–8 on hard courts, and Murray leads 2–0 on grass. The two are almost exactly the same age, with Murray being only a week older than Djokovic. They went to training camp together, and Murray won the first match they ever played as teenagers. The pair met 19 times in finals, with Djokovic leading 11–8. Ten of the finals were at ATP Masters 1000 events, where they are tied at 5–5. They met in seven major finals: The 2011 Australian Open, the 2012 US Open, the 2013 Australian Open, the 2013 Wimbledon Championships, the 2015 Australian Open, the 2016 Australian Open, and the 2016 French Open. Djokovic won in Australia all four times and at the French Open, Murray emerged as the victor at the US Open and Wimbledon.

They also played a nearly five-hour-long semifinal match in the 2012 Australian Open, in which Djokovic won 7–5 in the fifth set after Murray led two sets to one. Murray and Djokovic met again in 2012 at the London 2012 Olympic Games, with Murray winning in straight sets. During the final of the 2012 Shanghai Masters, Murray held five championship points in the second set, however Djokovic saved each of them and went on to win the title, ending Murray's 12–match winning streak at the event. The three set matches they played in Rome and Shanghai in 2011 and 2012 respectively were voted the ATP World Tour Match of the Year for each respective season. Due to the tight competition between 2008 and 2013, many saw this as the emerging rivalry.

Djokovic went on to dominate the rivalry after the 2013 Wimbledon final, winning 13 of their last 16 matches. In 2016, Murray suffered his fourth loss (his fifth total) in the final of the Australian Open from Djokovic, followed by another defeat in the French Open final, where Djokovic won his first Roland Garros title and completed the Career Grand Slam. Murray and Djokovic met in the final at the year's end final of the ATP World Tour Finals for the first time in their rivalry, where the winner would be granted the year-end No. 1 status. Djokovic dropped only one set en route to the final, but lost in straight sets to Murray, who finished the year at No. 1 and became the first British player to achieve this feat.

=== Murray vs. Federer ===
Murray and Roger Federer met 25 times with Federer leading 14–11. Federer leads 12–10 on hard courts and 2–1 on grass, having never met on clay. They met six times at the Grand Slam tournament level, with Federer leading 5–1. After Federer won the first professional match they played, Murray led the first half of the rivalry, with an 8–5 lead in 2010. The second half of the rivalry was dominated by Federer, who leads 9–3 since 2011, and led their overall rivalry since the 2014 ATP World Tour Finals. Federer leads 5–3 in finals, having won each of their Grand Slam final meetings at the 2008 US Open, the 2010 Australian Open, and the 2012 Wimbledon Championships. Murray leads 6–3 in ATP 1000 tournaments and 2–0 in finals. They met five times at the ATP World Tour Finals, with Murray winning in Shanghai in 2008 and Federer coming out victorious in London in 2009, 2010, 2012, and in 2014.

In August 2012, Murray met Federer in the final of the London 2012 Olympics at Wimbledon Centre Court, just four weeks after the 2012 Wimbledon Final, in which Federer had defeated Murray to win his record-tying 7th title at the All-England Club. Murray defeated Federer in straight sets to win the gold medal, denying Federer a Career Golden Slam. In 2013 Murray beat Federer for the first time in a major in the semifinals of the Australian Open, prevailing in five sets after Federer had come back twice from a set down. Their last major meeting was at the 2015 Wimbledon Championships semifinals, where a dominant Federer defeated Murray. Murray is one of only three players to have recorded 10 or more victories over Federer. Their last meeting took place at the 2015 Cincinnati Masters semifinals, with Federer winning the match in two close sets, recording his fifth consecutive victory over Murray.

=== Murray vs. Nadal ===
Murray played against Rafael Nadal on 24 occasions starting in 2007, with Nadal leading 17–7. Nadal leads 7–2 on clay, 3–0 on grass and 7–5 on hard courts. The pair often met at Grand Slam level, with nine out of their 24 meetings coming in the majors, with Nadal leading 7–2 (3–0 at Wimbledon, 2–0 at the French Open, 1–1 at the Australian Open and 1–1 at the US Open). Eight of these nine appearances were at the quarterfinal and semifinal level. They never met in a major final, however, Murray leads 3–1 in ATP finals, with Nadal winning at Indian Wells in 2009 and Murray winning in Rotterdam the same year, Tokyo in 2011, and at Madrid in 2015.

Murray lost three consecutive major semifinals to Nadal in 2011 from the French Open to the US Open. At the semifinal stage of the 2014 French Open, Nadal triumphed in a dominant straight sets win for the loss of just 6 games. In one of their last meetings, Murray beat Nadal for the first time on clay, and the first time in a Masters 1000 final, at the Madrid Open in 2015. Murray fell to Nadal in the semifinals of the 2016 Monte Carlo Masters, despite taking the first set. Three weeks later they met again at the semifinals of the 2016 Madrid Open, with Murray winning.

=== Murray vs. Wawrinka ===
Murray and Stan Wawrinka played 23 times with Murray leading 13–10. Murray leads 9–4 on hard courts and 3–0 on grass courts while Wawrinka leads 6–1 on clay courts. They also met eight times in the majors, with Wawrinka leading 5–3. They contested some close matches and one of their most notable meetings was in the 2009 Wimbledon fourth round, which Murray won in five sets; this was the first men's match to be played under the Wimbledon roof, having the latest finish for a Wimbledon match at the time. Wawrinka beat Murray in four sets at the 2010 US Open and ended Murray's title defence at the 2013 US Open quarterfinals, but lost as defending champion to Murray in the semifinals of the 2016 French Open.

== Playing style ==
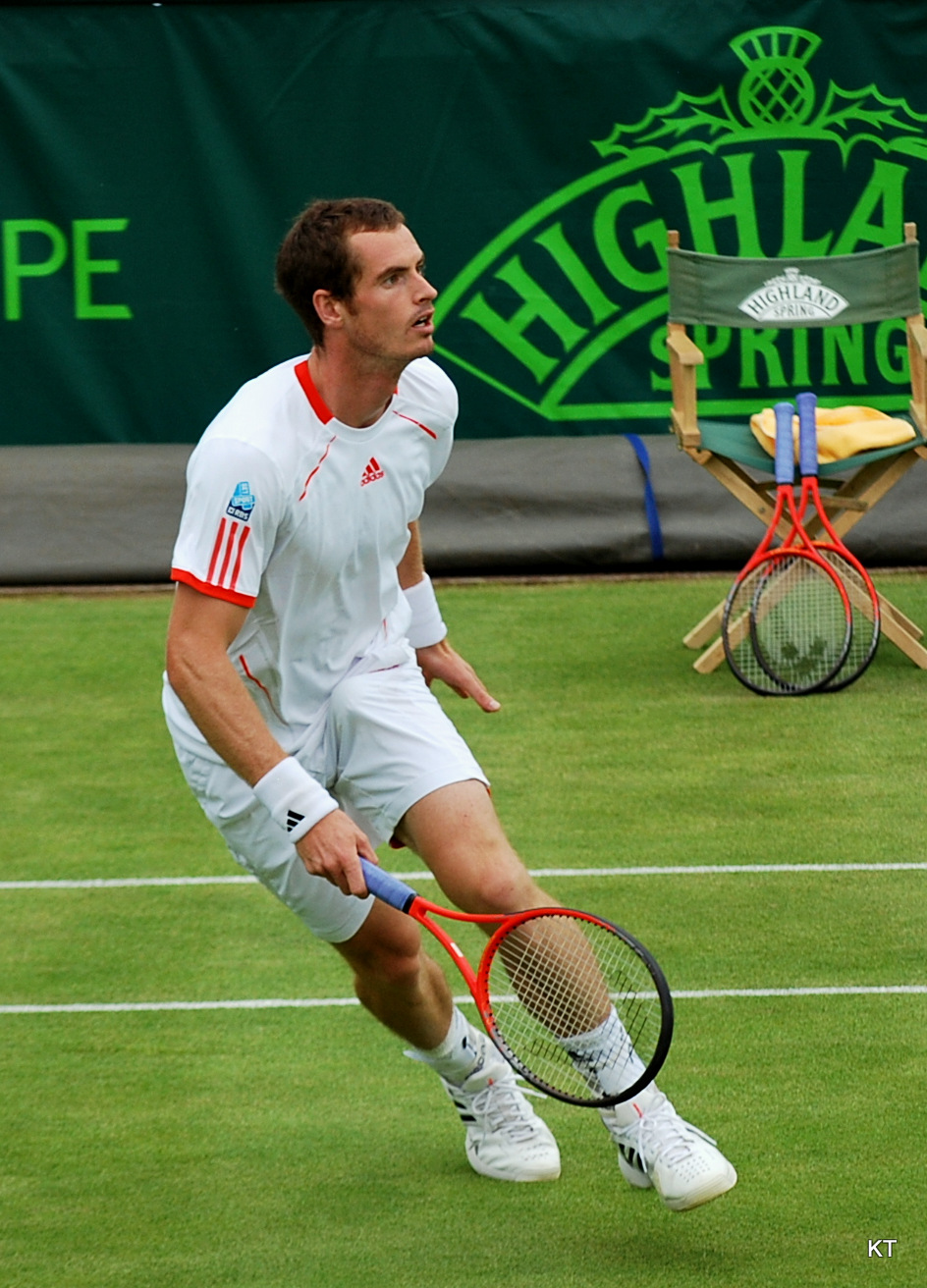
At the Boodles Challenge, Stoke Park, June 2012

Murray had an all-court game with an emphasis on defensive baseline play, and in 2009 professional tennis coach Paul Annacone suggested that Murray "may be the best counterpuncher on tour today". His strengths included groundstrokes with low error rate, the ability to anticipate and react, and his transition from defence to offence with speed, which enabled him to hit winners from defensive positions. Murray also had one of the best two-handed backhands on the tour, while he primarily used his more passive forehand and a sliced backhand to let opponents play into his defensive game before playing more offensively. Tim Henman stated in 2013 that Murray may have the best lob in the game. Murray's tactics often involved passive exchanges from the baseline. He was capable of injecting sudden pace into his groundstrokes to surprise his opponents who were used to the slow rally. Murray was one of the top returners in the game, often able to block back fast serves with his excellent reach and ability to anticipate.

Murray is known for having been one of the most intelligent tacticians on the court, often constructing points. Other strengths in his game included his drop shot and net game. As he played predominantly from the baseline, he usually approached the net to volley when finishing points more quickly. Murray was most proficient on a fast surface, like grass, where he won eight singles titles including the Wimbledon Championships and the 2012 Olympic Gold Medal, although hard courts were his preferred surface. He worked hard since 2008 on improving his clay court game, ultimately winning his first clay titles during 2015 at Munich and Madrid, as well as reaching his first French Open final during 2016. While Murray's serve was a major weapon for him, with his first serve reaching speeds of 130 mph or higher on some occasions and winning him many free points, it could become inconsistent when hit under pressure, especially with a more vulnerable and slower second serve. Since the 2011 season, under Ivan Lendl's coaching, Murray played a more offensive game and also worked to improve his second serve, forehand, consistency and mental game which were all crucial to his further success.

== Endorsements and equipment ==
In 2009, German manufacturer Adidas and Murray signed a five-year deal worth £10 million. This included wearing their range of tennis shoes. The contract with Adidas allowed Murray to keep his shirt sleeve sponsors Shiatzy Chen, Royal Bank of Scotland and Highland Spring. Before he was signed by Adidas in late 2009, he wore Fred Perry apparel. At the end of their contract Adidas decided not to re-sign with Murray, and he began a four-year partnership with Under Armour in December 2014, reportedly worth $25 million. Murray signed with Castore for the 2019 season which Murray called his last deal before announcing his retirement. Murray used Head rackets, and appeared in advertisements for the brand. In the final few months of his career, Murray switched to a Yonex racket.

== Coaches ==
Murray's coach has changed through the years: Leon Smith (1998–2004), Pato Álvarez (2003–2005), Mark Petchey (2005–2006), Brad Gilbert (2006–2007), Miles Maclagan (2007–2010), Àlex Corretja (2010–2011), Ivan Lendl (2011–2014, 2016–2017, 2022–2023), Amélie Mauresmo (2014–2016), Jonas Björkman (2015), Jamie Delgado (2016–2021). In 2022 he was briefly coached by Dani Vallverdu; Ivan Lendl was his coach from March 2022 until November 2023.

== Coaching career ==
=== Novak Djokovic (2025) ===
On 23 November 2024, it was announced via social media that Murray had been hired by his longtime rival Djokovic to serve as his head coach ahead of Djokovic's 2025 season. During that time, Murray coached Djokovic as he reached the semifinal of the 2025 Australian Open and the final of the 2025 Miami Open. On 13 May it was announced that Murray and Djokovic had stopped working together. Under Murray's tutelage, Djokovic held a record of 12–7.

=== Jack Draper (2026) ===
In May 2026, Murray was brought into Jack Draper's coaching team for the grass-court season (June–July), which would have included Wimbledon but Draper withdrew 24 hours before his opening match, citing the recurrence of a left arm injury. Draper and Murray had a good relationship prior to the appointment, with the former reportedly often referring to Murray as a "big brother" figure. The role was Murray's first since his stint with Novak Djokovic across 2024 and 2025.

== Charitable work ==
Murray is a founding member of the Malaria No More UK Leadership Council and helped launch the charity in 2009 with David Beckham. Murray also made a short public service announcement for the charity to help raise awareness and funds. Murray has also taken part in several charity tennis events, including the Rally for Relief events before the 2011 Australian Open.

In June 2013, Murray teamed up with former British No. 1 Tim Henman for a charity doubles match against Murray's coach and eight-time grand slam champion Ivan Lendl, and No. 6 Tomáš Berdych. The event named Rally Against Cancer was organised to raise money for Royal Marsden Cancer Charity after his best friend and fellow British player Ross Hutchins was diagnosed with Hodgkin's lymphoma. Following his victory at the tournament, Murray donated his entire prize money pot to the charity.

In June 2014, following the death of Elena Baltacha from liver cancer, Murray featured in an event known as 'Rally for Bally' to raise money for the Royal Marsden Cancer Charity and the Elena Baltacha Academy of Tennis. Murray was awarded the Arthur Ashe Humanitarian of the Year award for 2014.

== Public image ==
=== National identity ===
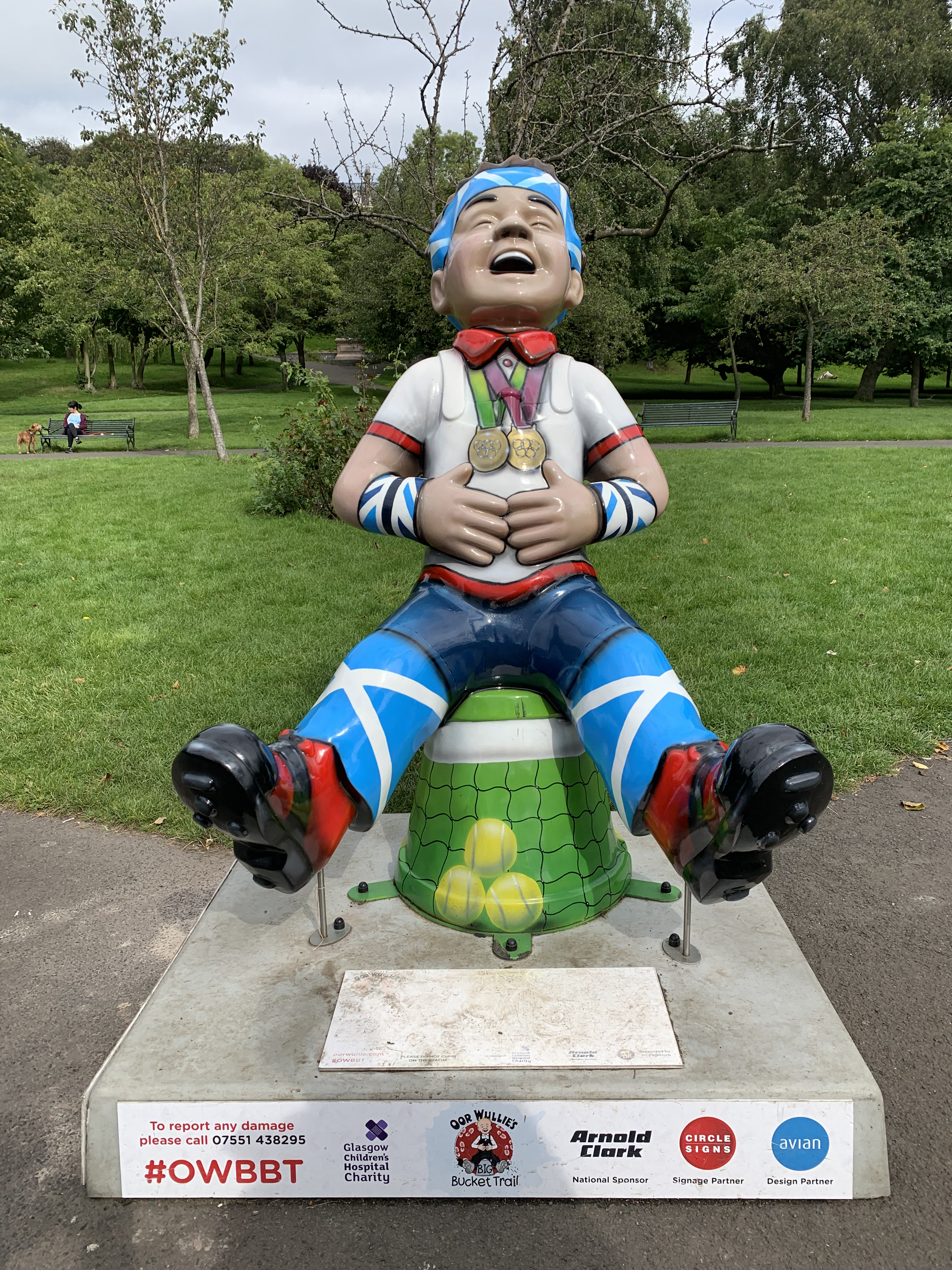
A sculpture of Oor Wullie depicted as Andy Murray as part of Oor Wullie's Big Bucket Trail.

Murray identifies himself as "Scottish, but also British". His national identity has often been commented on by the media. Much of the discussion about Murray's national identity began before Wimbledon 2006, when he was quoted as saying he would "support whoever England is playing" at the 2006 World Cup. English ex-tennis player Tim Henman confirmed that the remarks had been made in jest and were only in response to Murray being teased by journalist Des Kelly and Henman about Scotland's failure to qualify.

Murray initially refused to endorse either side of the debate in the 2014 referendum on Scottish independence, citing the abuse he had received after his 2006 World Cup comments. Just before the referendum, Murray tweeted a message that was considered by the media to be supportive of independence. (Note: Murray tweeted "Huge day for Scotland today! no campaign negativity last few days totally swayed my view on it. excited to see the outcome. lets do this!") He received online abuse for expressing his opinion, including messages that were described as "vile" by Police Scotland. A few days after the vote, in which a 55% majority opposed Scottish independence, Murray said that he did not regret stating his view, but that he would concentrate on his tennis career in the future.

=== Other ===
In 2006, having been given a warning for racket abuse in a match with Kenneth Carlsen, Murray in the post-match interview stated that he and Carlsen had "played like women". Murray was booed for the remark, but said later that the comment had been intended as a jocular response to what Svetlana Kuznetsova had said at the Hopman Cup. A few months later, Murray was fined for swearing at the umpire during a Davis Cup doubles rubber. Murray refused to shake hands with the umpire at the end of the match.

In 2007, Murray suggested that tennis had a match-fixing problem, stating that everyone knows it goes on, in the wake of the investigation surrounding Nikolay Davydenko.

In a 2015 column for the French sports newspaper L'Équipe, Murray criticised what he described as a double standard applied towards Amélie Mauresmo in her role as Murray's coach, highlighting how many observers attributed his poor performances during the early part of her tenure to her appointment, which Murray denied, before pointing out that his previous coaches had not been blamed by the media for other spells of poor form. He also lamented the lack of female coaches in elite tennis, and concluded: "Have I become a feminist? Well, if being a feminist is about fighting so that a woman is treated like a man then yes, I suppose I have". After BBC host John Inverdale indirectly suggested Murray was the first person to win more than one tennis Olympic gold medal, Murray interjected; "I think Venus and Serena have won about four each." Murray has also argued that male and female tennis players should receive equal amounts of prize money.

From 2020 to 2021, Murray was critical of the ATP's handling of the Alexander Zverev domestic abuse allegations, and urged the ATP to create a formal domestic abuse policy.

== Career statistics ==
=== Grand Slam performance timeline ===
Key
| **W** | F | SF | QF | #R | RR | Q# | DNQ | A | NH |

(W) winner; (F) finalist; (SF) semifinalist; (QF) quarterfinalist; (#R) rounds 4, 3, 2, 1; (RR) round-robin stage; (Q#) qualification round; (DNQ) did not qualify; (A) absent; (NH) not held; (SR) strike rate (events won / competed); (W–L) win–loss record.
To avoid confusion and double counting, these charts are updated at the conclusion of a tournament or when the player's participation has ended.

| Tournament | 2005 | 2006 | 2007 | 2008 | 2009 | 2010 | 2011 | 2012 | 2013 | 2014 | 2015 | 2016 | 2017 | 2018 | 2019 | 2020 | 2021 | 2022 | 2023 | 2024 | SR | W–L | Win % |
|---|---|---|---|---|---|---|---|---|---|---|---|---|---|---|---|---|---|---|---|---|---|---|---|
| Australian Open | A | 1R | 4R | 1R | 4R | F | F | SF | F | QF | F | F | 4R | A | 1R | A | A | 2R | 3R | 1R | 0 / 16 | 51–16 | 76% |
| French Open | A | 1R | A | 3R | QF | 4R | SF | QF | A | SF | SF | F | SF | A | A | 1R | A | A | A | 1R | 0 / 12 | 39–12 | 76% |
| Wimbledon | 3R | 4R | A | QF | SF | SF | SF | F | **W** | QF | SF | **W** | QF | A | A | NH | 3R | 2R | 2R | A | 2 / 15 | 61–13 | 82% |
| US Open | 2R | 4R | 3R | F | 4R | 3R | SF | **W** | QF | QF | 4R | QF | A | 2R | A | 2R | 1R | 3R | 2R | A | 1 / 17 | 49–16 | 75% |
| **Win–loss** | **3–2** | **6–4** | **5–2** | **12–4** | **15–4** | **16–4** | **21–4** | **22–3** | **17–2** | **17–4** | **19–4** | **23–3** | **12–3** | **1–1** | **0–1** | **1–2** | **2–2** | **4–3** | **4–3** | **0–2** | **3 / 60** | **200–57** | **78%** |

==== Grand Slam tournament finals: 11 (3 titles, 8 runner-ups) ====
| Result | Year | Championship | Surface | Opponent | Score |
|---|---|---|---|---|---|
| Loss | 2008 | US Open | Hard | (Switzerland) Roger Federer | 2–6, 5–7, 2–6 |
| Loss | 2010 | Australian Open | Hard | (Switzerland) Roger Federer | 3–6, 4–6, 6–7^{(11–13)} |
| Loss | 2011 | Australian Open | Hard | (Serbia) Novak Djokovic | 4–6, 2–6, 3–6 |
| Loss | 2012 | Wimbledon | Grass | (Switzerland) Roger Federer | 6–4, 5–7, 3–6, 4–6 |
| Win | 2012 | US Open | Hard | (Serbia) Novak Djokovic | 7–6^{(12–10)}, 7–5, 2–6, 3–6, 6–2 |
| Loss | 2013 | Australian Open | Hard | (Serbia) Novak Djokovic | 7–6^{(7–2)}, 6–7^{(3–7)}, 3–6, 2–6 |
| Win | 2013 | Wimbledon | Grass | (Serbia) Novak Djokovic | 6–4, 7–5, 6–4 |
| Loss | 2015 | Australian Open | Hard | (Serbia) Novak Djokovic | 6–7^{(5–7)}, 7–6^{(7–4)}, 3–6, 0–6 |
| Loss | 2016 | Australian Open | Hard | (Serbia) Novak Djokovic | 1–6, 5–7, 6–7^{(3–7)} |
| Loss | 2016 | French Open | Clay | (Serbia) Novak Djokovic | 6–3, 1–6, 2–6, 4–6 |
| Win | 2016 | Wimbledon (2) | Grass | (Canada) Milos Raonic | 6–4, 7–6^{(7–3)}, 7–6^{(7–2)} |

=== Year–End Championships performance timeline ===
| Tournament | 2003–2007 | 2008 | 2009 | 2010 | 2011 | 2012 | 2013 | 2014 | 2015 | 2016 | 2017 | 2018 | 2019 | 2020 | 2021 | 2022 | 2023 | 2024 | SR | W–L | Win % |
|---|---|---|---|---|---|---|---|---|---|---|---|---|---|---|---|---|---|---|---|---|---|
**Year-end championships**
| ATP Finals | did not qualify | SF | RR | SF | RR | SF | A | RR | RR | **W** | did not qualify | | | | | | | | 1 / 8 | 16–11 | 59% |

=== Year–End Championship finals ===
==== Singles: 1 (1 title) ====
| Result | Year | Tournament | Surface | Opponent | Score |
|---|---|---|---|---|---|
| Win | 2016 | ATP Finals, London | Hard (i) | (Serbia) Novak Djokovic | 6–3, 6–4 |

=== Olympic medal matches ===
==== Singles: 2 (2 gold medals) ====
| Result | Year | Tournament | Surface | Opponent | Score |
|---|---|---|---|---|---|
| Win | 2012 | London Olympics | Grass | (Switzerland) Roger Federer | 6–2, 6–1, 6–4 |
| Win | 2016 | Rio Olympics (2) | Hard | (Argentina) Juan Martín del Potro | 7–5, 4–6, 6–2, 7–5 |

==== Mixed doubles: 1 (1 silver medal) ====
| Result | Year | Tournament | Surface | Partner | Opponents | Score |
|---|---|---|---|---|---|---|
| Loss | 2012 | London Olympics | Grass | (United Kingdom) Laura Robson | (Belarus) Victoria Azarenka (Belarus) Max Mirnyi | 6–2, 3–6, [8–10] |

=== Records and achievements ===
- These records were attained in the Open Era.
- Records in **bold** indicate peerless achievements.
- Records in italics are currently active streaks.

| Time span | Records at each Grand Slam tournament | Players matched |
|---|---|---|
| 2008 US Open — 2012 Wimbledon | First four finals lost | Ivan Lendl |
| 2008 US Open — 2016 French Open | Runner-up finishes at all four majors | Novak Djokovic; Roger Federer; Ivan Lendl; Alexander Zverev |
| 2012 US Open — 2013 Australian Open | Reached final of next consecutive major after winning first title | Daniil Medvedev; Alexander Zverev |
| **2012 Olympics —** **2012 US Open** | **Winner of Olympic singles gold medal and US Open in same calendar year** | **Stands alone** |

| Grand Slam tournaments | Time span | Records at each Grand Slam tournament | Players matched |
|---|---|---|---|
| **Australian Open** | **2010–2016** | **5 runner-up finishes overall** | **Stands alone** |
| Australian Open | 2010–2011; 2015–2016 | 2 consecutive runner-up finishes | Pat Cash; Steve Denton; Stefan Edberg |
| Wimbledon | 2012 | Latest finish for a match (11:02) vs. Marcos Baghdatis | Marcos Baghdatis |
| US Open | 2012 | Longest final (by duration) vs. Novak Djokovic | Ivan Lendl; Mats Wilander; Novak Djokovic |
| US Open | 2012 | Longest tiebreak in a final (by points – 22) vs. Novak Djokovic | Novak Djokovic |

| Time span | Record accomplished | Players matched |
Olympics
| **2012–2016** | **2 consecutive Olympics singles gold medals** | **Stands alone** |
| **2012–2016** | **2 Olympic singles gold medals overall** | **Stands alone** |
| 2012–2016 | 3 medals overall (singles, doubles & mixed) | Fernando González; Mike Bryan |
Davis Cup
| 2015 | Maximum 8 singles rubber wins in a Davis Cup season | John McEnroe; Mats Wilander |
| 2011 | Triple bagel win (6–0, 6–0, 6–0) | 16 players |
Shanghai Masters
| 2010–2016 | 4 finals overall | Novak Djokovic |
| 2010–2011 | 2 consecutive titles | Novak Djokovic |
| **2010–2012** | **3 consecutive finals** | **Stands alone** |
Queen's Club Championships
| **2009–2016** | **5 singles titles** | **Stands alone** |
| **2009–2019** | **6 titles overall** | **Stands alone** |
In a Single Year / Season
| **2016** | **Winner of Grand Slam, Olympics Gold Medal, ATP Masters 1000 Title and ATP Finals** | **Stands alone** |
In a Career
| 2012–2016 | Final of all four Grand Slams, Olympic Games singles, ATP Finals and Davis Cup | Roger Federer; Rafael Nadal |
| 2012–2016 | Winner of a Grand Slam, Olympics singles gold medal, Davis Cup, the ATP Finals and year-end ATP/ITF World number 1 | Andre Agassi |

=== Professional awards ===
- ITF World Champion: 2016.
- ATP Player of the Year: 2016.

== Awards and honours ==
- BBC Young Sports Personality of the Year: 2004
- BBC Sports Personality Team of the Year: 2012, 2015
- Most Titles in an ATP World Tour Season: 6 in 2009, 9 in 2016
- US Open Series Champion: 2010, 2015
- Best ATP World Tour Match of the Year (3): 2010, (Note: ATP World Tour Finals semi-final lost. Rafael Nadal 6–7(5), 6–3, 6–7(6)) 2011, (Note: Rome semi-final lost. Novak Djokovic 1–6, 6–3, 6–7(2)) 2012 (Note: Shanghai final lost. Novak Djokovic 7–5, 6–7(11), 3–6)
- Officer of the Order of the British Empire: 2013
- Laureus "World Breakthrough of the Year" Award: 2013
- Glenfiddich Spirit of Scotland Award for Top Scot: 2013
- Glenfiddich Spirit of Scotland Award for Sport: 2013
- BBC Sports Personality of the Year: 2013, 2015, 2016
- Doctor of the University of Stirling: 2014
- Freeman of Stirling: 2014
- Freeman of Merton: 2014
- Arthur Ashe Humanitarian of the Year: 2014, 2022
- ITF Player of the Year: 2016
- Knight Bachelor: 2017
- ATP Comeback of the Year: 2019
- 3rd Class Order of Merit of Ukraine: 2022

== See also ==
- 2012 Summer Olympics and Paralympics gold post boxes
- List of Grand Slam men's singles champions
- Open Era tennis records – Men's singles

== Notes ==
Sporting positions
| Preceded by Novak Djokovic | World No. 1; 7 November 2016 – 20 August 2017 | Succeeded by Rafael Nadal |
| Preceded by Sam Querrey; Milos Raonic | US Open Series Champion; 2010; 2015 | Succeeded by Mardy Fish; Kei Nishikori |
Awards
| Preceded by Kate Haywood | BBC Young Sports Personality of the Year; 2004 | Succeeded by Harry Aikines-Aryeetey |
| Preceded by Rory McIlroy | Laureus World Breakthrough of the Year; 2013 | Succeeded by Marc Márquez |
| Preceded by Bradley Wiggins; Lewis Hamilton | BBC Sports Personality of the Year; 2013; 2015, 2016 | Succeeded by Lewis Hamilton; Mo Farrah |
| Preceded by Roger Federer; Marcus Daniell | Arthur Ashe Humanitarian of the Year; 2014; 2022 | Succeeded by Bob Bryan & Mike Bryan; Félix Auger-Aliassime |
| Preceded by Novak Djokovic | ATP Player of the Year; 2016 | Succeeded by Rafael Nadal |
| Preceded by Novak Djokovic | ITF World Champion; 2016 | Succeeded by Rafael Nadal |
Olympic Games
| Preceded by Chris Hoy | Flagbearer for Great Britain; Rio de Janeiro 2016 | Succeeded by Hannah Mills & Moe Sbihi |
