= Novak Djokovic junior years =

Serbian tennis player Novak Djokovic's main accomplishments as a junior player came in the U14 circuit of the ETA Junior Tour, where, at the U14 European championship in 2001, he won both the singles tournament over Lukáš Lacko and the doubles with compatriot Bojan Božović. Djokovic also led the Serbian team to victory in the European Summer Cup, thus ending the year as a European champion in singles, doubles and in team competition, while also winning the silver medal at the ITF World Junior Championship in a team competition for Yugoslavia. Djokovic ended 2001 at the top of the ETA rankings for U14s, one place ahead of future rival Andy Murray at No. 2. He was also briefly the No. 1-ranked U16 player in 2003.

On the ITF Junior Circuit, Djokovic compiled a singles win-loss record of 56–12 (and 23–6 in doubles), reaching a combined junior world ranking of No. 24 in February 2004. At the junior Grand Slam events, his best showing was at the Australian Open where he reached the semi-finals in 2004. He also played at the French Open and US Open junior events in 2003. Djokovic also won two ITF junior singles tournaments in his career, both in 2002.

== First steps ==
In September 2000, the 13-year-old Djokovic felt he was ready to take further steps a little faster than his contemporaries, so he decided to try a tournament in the ITF Junior Circuit, a worldwide U18 competition. The tournament was played at just twenty kilometers away from his home in Belgrade, in the small town of Pančevo, and he entered as a lucky loser before being eliminated in the first round by seventh seed Gligorce Sanev. Following this experience, his then coach Nikola Pilić convinced Djokovic that he should not try to "participate in some tournaments too early" under the risk of "getting lost". And in fact, Djokovic did not play in any other ITF tournament until 2002, as he instead opted to play in ETA youth tournaments, played throughout Europe.

== ETA Junior Tour ==
=== U14 circuit ===
In 2001, Djokovic dominated the U14 circuit in the ETA Junior Tour, currently known as the Tennis Europe Junior Tour. At first, however, he had a poor start to the season, being eliminated from the prestigious Les Petits As tournament in the quarterfinals by the eventual runner-up and future rival Andy Murray (6–0, 6–1), and then losing all of his singles matches in the European Winter Cup, including his rubber against the eventual champions Great Britain, in which he again lost in straight sets to Murray. Djokovic returned to form in Italy, where he won his first ETA title in a second category tournament in Messina, defeating his compatriot Bojan Božović in the final, and also reached the final of a first category tournament in Arezzo, which he lost to Mischa Zverev. Djokovic then won his second ETA title of the season in Livorno after beating the No. 1 seed Murray in the semi-finals, and the No. 2 seed Aljoscha Thron in the final, 5–7, 7–5, 6–4.

In July, Djokovic was the No. 1 seed at the U14 European championship, held in Sanremo, where he became only the fourth player in the competition's history to win both the singles and doubles events, beating Lukáš Lacko in the singles final, and pairing with Božović in doubles to defeat the Russian pair of Alexandre Krasnoroutskiy and Mikhail Bekker in the final. As a member of the Yugoslav national team, Djokovic reached the final of the ITF World Junior Championship for players under 14, in which he lost his match in singles to Germany's Aljoscha Thron. Djokovic also led the Serbian team to victory in the European Summer Cup, thus ending the year as a European champion in singles, doubles and in team competition, while also winning the silver medal at the World Junior Championship in a team competition for Yugoslavia. Djokovic ended 2001 at the top of the ETA rankings for U14s, one place ahead of Murray at No. 2.

=== U16 circuit ===
In 2002, Djokovic continued his dominance, now in the U16 circuit. In April, Djokovic played two U16 tournaments in Belgium, both on clay, the first in Anderlecht, dropping only one set en route to the final, which he lost to Marcel Granollers, 6–2, 6–1. The second tournament was held in Rixensart, where Djokovic lost in the quarterfinals to Pablo Andújar in a deciding set tiebreak. After the tournaments ended, the tournament director Vincent Stavaux stated: "We saw some very beautiful tennis, often more pleasant to follow than professional matches. I particularly appreciated the young Yugoslav Novak Djokovic. A name to remember, believe me!".

In June, Djokovic won two prestigious tournaments in France, the Derby Cadets in La Boule, where he beat future world No. 6 Gaël Monfils in the final, and Le Pontet in Avignon. In July 2002, Djokovic played the U16 European Championships in Genoa, losing in the quarterfinals to Denis Matsukevich. This proved to be his last U16 match in a singles competition, as Djokovic then joined the ITF Junior Circuit, a worldwide U18 competition.

== ITF Junior Circuit ==
=== 2002: Maiden titles ===
Following a two-year hiatus, Djokovic returned to the ITF junior circuit in September 2002, at the age of 15, and played his first match there in Pančevo, the exact same tournament that he had contested two years earlier, in 2000. In what was only his second appearance on ITF, Djokovic went on to claim the trophy after winning all of his matches in straight sets, some of which against rivals three years older than him, including the No. 1 seed David Savić in the final, 6–2, 6–2. In the doubles event, Djokovic paired with Luka Ocvirk to defeat the Yugoslavian pair of Savić and Viktor Troicki in the semi-finals, but then they lost the final. Djokovic and Savić faced each other again a week later in the quarterfinals of the Yugoslavia Junior Open in Novi Sad, this time losing in three sets.

In November, Djokovic went on a tour in the United States, where he participated in the U18s category at the prestigious Eddie Herr International Junior Championships in Florida, and in the Prince Cup and Orange Bowl in Miami. At first, he struggled to adapt to USA's different balls and weather, which resulted in a first-round loss to Luis-Manuel Flores in Florida. While competing there, the Djokovic family contemplated leaving Novak in Nick Bollettieri's Academy because the conditions to train were phenomenal, but when his father asked him if he wanted to stay there, Djokovic replied: "No, let’s go back to Niki". Djokovic defeated home favourite Stephen Bass to win his first ever tournament overseas, the Prince Cup, despite having to play the final just a few hours after winning a qualifier round for the Orange Bowl, which is one of ITF's five Grade A tournaments, the junior equivalent of ATP Masters 1000. Djokovic defeated two Americans in the main draw before losing in the third round to Marcos Baghdatis in three close sets.

=== 2003: Maiden Junior Grand Slam appearances ===
Djokovic began the 2003 season by reaching the final of the Bavarian Junior Challenge in Nuremberg, where he faced Josh Goodall. After winning the first set 6–2, he retired during the second due to pain in his lower stomach; an injury that he had sustained at the gym in the academy of Niki Pilić in Munich. Following a six-week break to recover from his injury, Djokovic returned in May to play the Trofeo Bonfiglio in Milan on clay, his second Grade A tournament, where he lost in the quarterfinals to Flores, who thus became the first player to beat Djokovic twice in the ITF. In the doubles event, however, Djokovic paired with Troicki to win his first and only ITF doubles title, defeating the German pair of Sebastian Rieschick and Jerome Becker in the final.

In June 2003, Djokovic made his junior grand slam debut at the French Open after defeating future Orange Bowl champion Timothy Neilly in the final round of the qualifying draw. In the main draw, he won two matches before losing in the third round to Daniel Gimeno Traver in three sets. Having turned 16 in May, Djokovic could now commit more time to the senior circuit, and he proved himself straight away by winning a Futures in June, in Belgrade, his first senior ITF title and fourth overall. This earned him an interview in July, filmed in Belgrade, in which he stated that he was currently the No. 30 in the ITF rankings for U18 players, and also the No. 710 in the ATP rankings with 16 ATP Points. In August, Djokovic, together with his teammates and under the leadership of team captain Jovan Lilić, competed in the U16 European summer championship, held in Le Touquet, where he was the backbone of the Serbian squad, going 6–0 in singles and doubles rubbers to lead the nation to glory and to win his first ITF title in team competition; and in doing so, he became Europe's best U16 player.

During the summer, Djokovic reached the semi-finals of two Futures tournaments, an F4 and an F6 event. This gave him the confidence to attack the US Open junior event in September, where he was a direct entrant into the main draw, but lost in the first round to Robert Smeets. Djokovic played his last tournament for the year at the U16 Junior Davis Cup, in the clay courts of Essen, where he entered as the world's best U16 player, helping his country to a 2–1 victory over India in the first round by winning his singles and doubles matches. He then claimed wins over two future top 30 players, Santiago Giraldo and Jeremy Chardy.

=== 2004: Australian Open Junior semi-final ===
Djokovic began the 2004 season at the Australian Hardcourt Championships in Victoria, where he lost in the third round to Monfils. Djokovic then had his best junior Grand Slam performance at the Australian Open, defeating the sixth seed Bruno Rosa in the third round and the second seed Mischa Zverev in the quarterfinals before losing to Josselin Ouanna in the semi-finals. This proved to be his penultimate tournament on the ITF junior circuit, with his last coming a few months later in August, the U18 European Summer Cup, where he recorded three wins, including Lukáš Lacko.

Despite having another year as a junior left to go (2005), Djokovic instead decided to play full-time on the ATP tour, thus ending his ITF junior career at the end of 2004. Djokovic compiled a singles win-loss record of 56–12 for a win percentage of 82% (and 23–6 in doubles for 79%), including 24–5 on clay, 22–5 on hard courts, and 10–2 on the other surfaces (grass and carpet). He reached a combined junior world ranking of No. 24 in February 2004. In total, Djokovic won four ITF junior tournaments, two in singles, one in doubles, and one in team competition in Le Touquet.

== ETA Junior Circuit finals ==
=== Singles: 7 (5 titles, 2 runner-up) ===
1–0	Tier G2
1–1	Tier G1
2–1	Tier G1
3–1	Tier GA
3–2	Tier G1
4–2	Tier G1
5–2	Tier G1

Result	W–L	Date	Tournament	Tier	Surface	Opponent	Score
Win	1–0	Mar 2001	Messina, Italy	G2	Clay	(Socialist Federal Republic of Yugoslavia) Bojan Božović	6–1, 6–2
Loss	1–1	Apr 2001	Arezzo, Italy	G1	Clay	(Germany) Mischa Zverev	6–3, 2–6, 5–7
Win	2–1	May 2001	Livorno, Italy	G1	Clay	(Germany) Aljoscha Thron	5–7, 7–5, 6–4
Win	3–1	Jul 2001	U14 European championship, Italy	GA	Clay	(Slovakia) Lukáš Lacko	6–2, 6–7, 6–3
Loss	3–2	Apr 2002	Anderlecht, Belgium	G1	Clay	(Spain) Marcel Granollers	2–6, 1–6
Win	4–2	Jun 2002	Derby Cadets, France	G1	Clay	(France) Gaël Monfils	6–2, 6–7, 6–3
Win	5–2	Jun 2002	Le Pontet, France	G1	Clay	(Greece) Zacharias Katsigiannakis	6–3, 6–3

=== Doubles: 1 (1 title) ===
1–0	Tier GA

Result	W–L	Date	Tournament	Tier	Surface	Partner	Opponents	Score
Win	1–0	Jul 2001	U14 European championship, Italy	GA	Clay	(Socialist Federal Republic of Yugoslavia) Bojan Božović	(Russia) Alexandre Krasnoroutskiy (Russia) Mikhail Bekker	7–6, 7–5

== ITF Junior Circuit finals ==
=== Singles: 3 (2 titles, 1 runner-up) ===
1–0	Tier G1
2–0	Tier G1
2–1	Tier G1

Result	W–L	Date	Tournament	Tier	Surface	Opponent	Score
Win	1–0	Sep 2002	Internacional Pancevo Tournament, Serbia	G2	Clay	(Socialist Federal Republic of Yugoslavia) David Savić	6–2, 6–2
Win	2–0	Dec 2002	Prince Cup, Miami	GA	Hard	(United States) Stephen Bass	6–2, 6–1
Loss	2–1	Feb 2003	Bavarian Junior Challenge, Nuremberg	G2	Clay	(United Kingdom) Josh Goodall	6–2, 1–2

=== Doubles: 2 (1 titles, 1 runner-ups) ===
0–1	Tier G1
1–1	Tier GA

Result	W–L	Date	Tournament	Tier	Surface	Partner	Opponents	Score
Loss	0–1	Sep 2002	Internacional Pancevo Tournament, Serbia	G2	Clay	(Croatia) Luka Ocvirk	(Ukraine) Dmytro Tolok (Russia) Alexander Kudryavtsev	1–6, 6–2, 5–7
Win	1–1	May 2003	Trofeo Bonfiglio, Milan	GA	Clay	(Socialist Federal Republic of Yugoslavia) Viktor Troicki	(Germany) Jerome Becker (Germany) Sebastian Rieschick	6–2, 4–6, 6–1

=== ITF Junior singles titles ===
Legend (singles)
Grand Slam (0)
Grade A (0)
Grade B (0)
Grade 1–5 (2)

== See also ==
- Novak Djokovic
- Novak Djokovic career statistics
- List of career achievements by Novak Djokovic

== Sources ==
- Bowers, Chris (2014). The Sporting Statesman – Novak Djokovic and the Rise of Serbia. London: Kings Road Publishing. ISBN 9781782197706.
