= Bojan Božović =

Bojan Božović may refer to:

- Bojan Božović (footballer) (born 1985), Montenegrin footballer
- Bojan Božović (tennis) (born 1987), Serbian tennis player
