= 2006 Mutua Madrileña Masters Madrid – Singles =

Singles
- 2006 Mutua Madrileña Masters Madrid

Final
- Champion: (Switzerland) Roger Federer
- Runner-up: (Chile) Fernando González
- Score: 7–5, 6–1, 6–0

Details
- Draw: 48
- Seeds: 16

Events
Singles	Doubles
← 2005 ·	Mutua Madrileña Masters Madrid	· 2007 →

Roger Federer defeated Fernando González in the final, 7–5, 6–1, 6–0 to win the singles tennis title at the 2006 Madrid Open. He did not drop a set during the tournament.

Rafael Nadal was the defending champion, but lost in the quarterfinals to Tomáš Berdych.

This tournament marked the first professional-level match played between Novak Djokovic and Andy Murray, who would go on to play a total of 36 ATP Tour-level matches against each other; Djokovic won their third-round encounter.

== Seeds ==
A champion seed is indicated in bold text while text in italics indicates the round in which that seed was eliminated. All sixteen seeds received a bye into the second round.

1. (Switzerland) **Roger Federer (champion)**
2. (Spain) Rafael Nadal (quarterfinals)
3. (Croatia) Ivan Ljubičić (second round)
4. (Argentina) David Nalbandian (semifinals)
5. (Russia) Nikolay Davydenko (second round)
6. (United States) Andy Roddick (third round)
7. (Spain) Tommy Robredo (third round)
8. (United States) James Blake (second round)
9. (Cyprus) Marcos Baghdatis (second round)
10. (Chile) Fernando González (final)
11. (Czech Republic) Tomáš Berdych (semifinals)
12. (Croatia) Mario Ančić (second round)
13. (Germany) Tommy Haas (third round)
14. (Spain) David Ferrer (second round)
15. (Serbia) Novak Djokovic (quarterfinals)
16. (Spain) Juan Carlos Ferrero (second round)

== Draw ==
Key

- Q = Qualifier
- WC = Wild card
- LL = Lucky loser
- Alt = Alternate
- ITF = ITF entry
- PR = Protected ranking
- SR = Special ranking
- SE = Special exempt
- JE = Junior exempt
- JR = Junior Accelerator Programme entrant
- CO = College Accelerator Programme entrant
- NG = Next Gen Accelerator Program entrant
- w/o = Walkover
- r = Retired
- d = Defaulted

=== Finals ===
Quarterfinals
1	(Switzerland) **Roger Federer**	**6**	**7^{7}**
(United States) Robby Ginepri	3	6^{4}
4	(Argentina) **David Nalbandian**	**6**	6^{6}	**7^{7}**
PR	(Russia) Marat Safin	4	**7^{8}**	6^{2}
10	(Chile) **Fernando González**	**7**	5	**7**
15	(Serbia) Novak Djokovic	5	**7**	5
11	(Czech Republic) **Tomáš Berdych**	**6**	**7^{8}**
2	(Spain) Rafael Nadal	3	6^{6}

Semifinals
1	(Switzerland) **Roger Federer**	**6**	**6**
4	(Argentina) David Nalbandian	4	0
10	(Chile) **Fernando González**	**6**	**6**
11	(Czech Republic) Tomáš Berdych	3	1

Final
1	(Switzerland) **Roger Federer**	**7**	**6**	**6**
10	(Chile) Fernando González	5	1	0

=== Top half ===
==== Section 1 ====
First round
(Argentina) G Gaudio	**6**	3	r
(Chile) **N Massú**	4	**6**
(Sweden) **R Söderling**	**6**	**6**
(Belgium) O Rochus	3	4
(United States) **R Ginepri**	**6**	3	**6**
WC	(Spain) F López	1	**6**	3
(Argentina) **J I Chela**	**6**	**6**
WC	(Spain) C Moyà	3	2

Second round
1	(Switzerland) **R Federer**	**6**	**6**
(Chile) N Massú	3	2
(Sweden) **R Söderling**	**6**	**6**
16	(Spain) J C Ferrero	3	2
12	(Croatia) M Ančić	6^{5}	6^{5}
(United States) **R Ginepri**	**7^{7}**	**7^{7}**
(Argentina) J I Chela	6^{2}	6^{3}
7	(Spain) **T Robredo**	**7^{7}**	**7^{7}**

Third round
1	(Switzerland) **R Federer**	**7^{7}**	**7^{10}**
(Sweden) R Söderling	6^{5}	6^{8}
(United States) **R Ginepri**	**6**	**7^{7}**
7	(Spain) T Robredo	3	6^{3}

Quarterfinals
1	(Switzerland) **R Federer**	**6**	**7^{7}**
(United States) R Ginepri	3	6^{4}

==== Section 2 ====
First round
Q	(Colombia) A Falla	2	1
Q	(France) **J Benneteau**	**6**	**6**
(Spain) F Verdasco	5	3
WC	(United Kingdom) **T Henman**	**7**	**6**
PR	(Russia) **M Safin**	**7^{7}**	6^{4}	**6**
(Argentina) J Acasuso	6^{5}	**7^{7}**	3
(Belgium) **K Vliegen**	**6**	**6**
(Russia) D Tursunov	3	1

Second round
4	(Argentina) **D Nalbandian**	6^{4}	**6**	**7**
Q	(France) J Benneteau	**7^{7}**	2	5
WC	(United Kingdom) **T Henman**	**6**	4	**6**
14	(Spain) D Ferrer	1	**6**	1
9	(Cyprus) M Baghdatis	4	3
PR	(Russia) **M Safin**	**6**	**6**
(Belgium) **K Vliegen**	**6**	3	**7^{7}**
8	(United States) J Blake	4	**6**	6^{5}

Third round
4	(Argentina) **D Nalbandian**	**6**	2	**7**
WC	(United Kingdom) T Henman	2	**6**	5
PR	(Russia) **M Safin**	**6**	**6**
(Belgium) K Vliegen	3	2

Quarterfinals
4	(Argentina) **D Nalbandian**	**6**	6^{6}	**7^{7}**
PR	(Russia) M Safin	4	**7^{8}**	6^{2}

=== Bottom half ===
==== Section 3 ====
First round
Q	(Argentina) J M del Potro	4	4
PR	(Sweden) **J Johansson**	**6**	**6**
(Thailand) **P Srichaphan**	**6**	**6**
Q	(Spain) G Fraile	2	2
(Finland) J Nieminen	2	3
(France) **R Gasquet**	**6**	**6**
(United Kingdom) **A Murray**	**6**	**6**
Q	(Spain) I Navarro	2	4

Second round
5	(Russia) N Davydenko	4	**7^{7}**	3
PR	(Sweden) **J Johansson**	**6**	6^{5}	**6**
(Thailand) P Srichaphan	5	**7^{7}**	4
10	(Chile) **F González**	**7**	6^{5}	**6**
15	(Serbia) **N Djokovic**	**7^{7}**	1	**6**
(France) R Gasquet	6^{2}	**6**	1
(United Kingdom) **A Murray**	**6**	3	**6**
3	(Croatia) I Ljubičić	4	**6**	3

Third round
PR	(Sweden) J Johansson
10	(Chile) **F González**	w/o
15	(Serbia) **N Djokovic**	1	**7**	**6**
(United Kingdom) A Murray	**6**	5	3

Quarterfinals
10	(Chile) **F González**	**7**	5	**7**
15	(Serbia) N Djokovic	5	**7**	5

==== Section 4 ====
First round
(France) **S Grosjean**	**6**	**7**
(Sweden) J Björkman	4	5
(Argentina) **A Calleri**	**7^{7}**	**6**
(France) F Serra	6^{3}	3
(France) G Monfils	**6**	2	r
(Slovakia) **D Hrbatý**	3	**2**
(Belgium) X Malisse	**7**	3	5
Q	(United States) **M Fish**	5	**6**	**7**

Second round
6	(United States) **A Roddick**	**6**	**7^{7}**
(France) S Grosjean	4	6^{3}
(Argentina) A Calleri	6^{2}	3
11	(Czech Republic) **T Berdych**	**7^{7}**	**6**
13	(Germany) **T Haas**	**6**	**7^{8}**
(Slovakia) D Hrbatý	3	6^{6}
Q	(United States) M Fish	4	2
2	(Spain) **R Nadal**	**6**	**6**

Third round
6	(United States) A Roddick	6^{7}	3
11	(Czech Republic) **T Berdych**	**7^{9}**	**6**
13	(Germany) T Haas	4	3
2	(Spain) **R Nadal**	**6**	**6**

Quarterfinals
11	(Czech Republic) **T Berdych**	**6**	**7^{8}**
2	(Spain) R Nadal	3	6^{6}
