= Djokovic–Murray rivalry =

Tennis rivalry between Novak Djokovic and Andy Murray

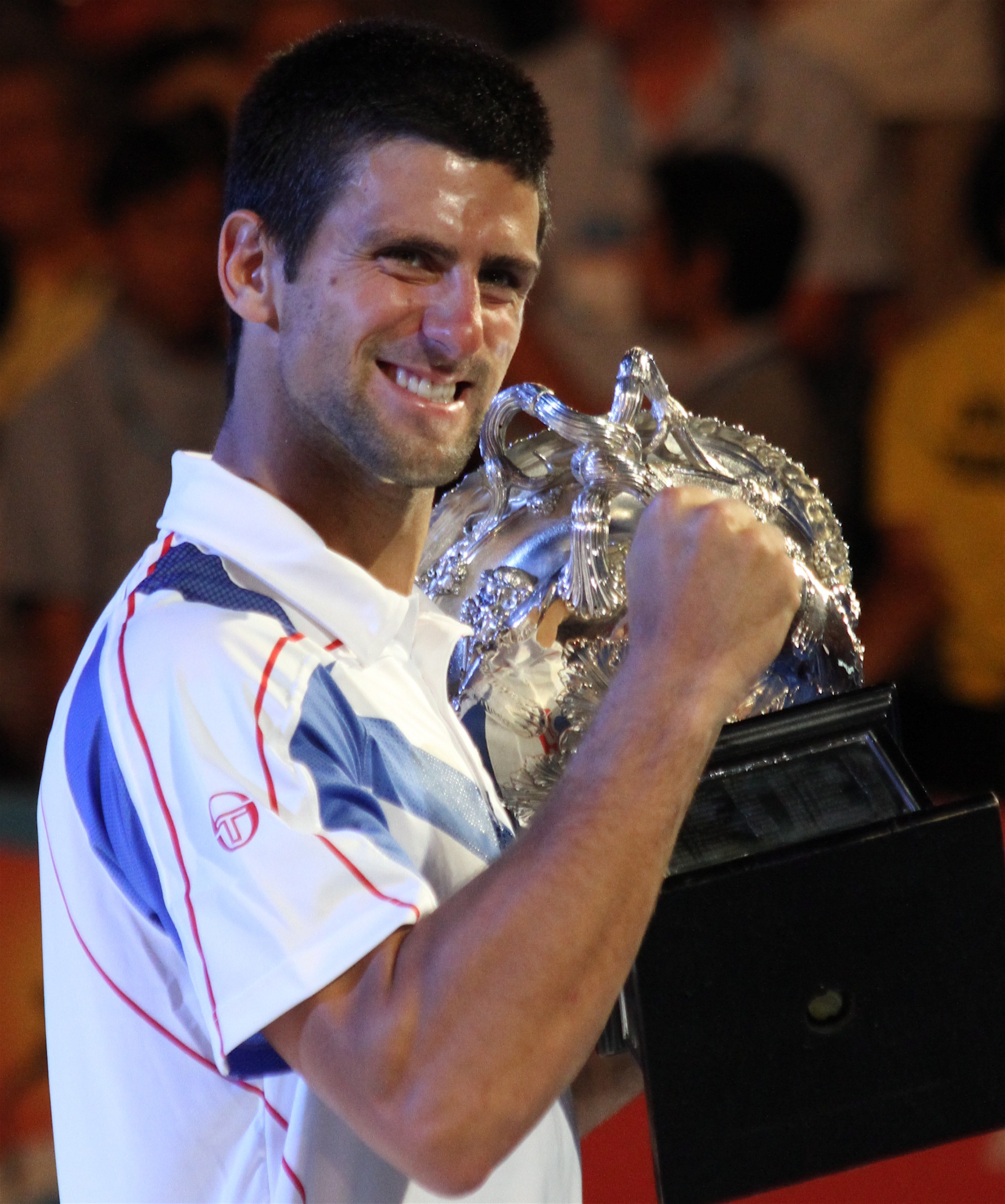
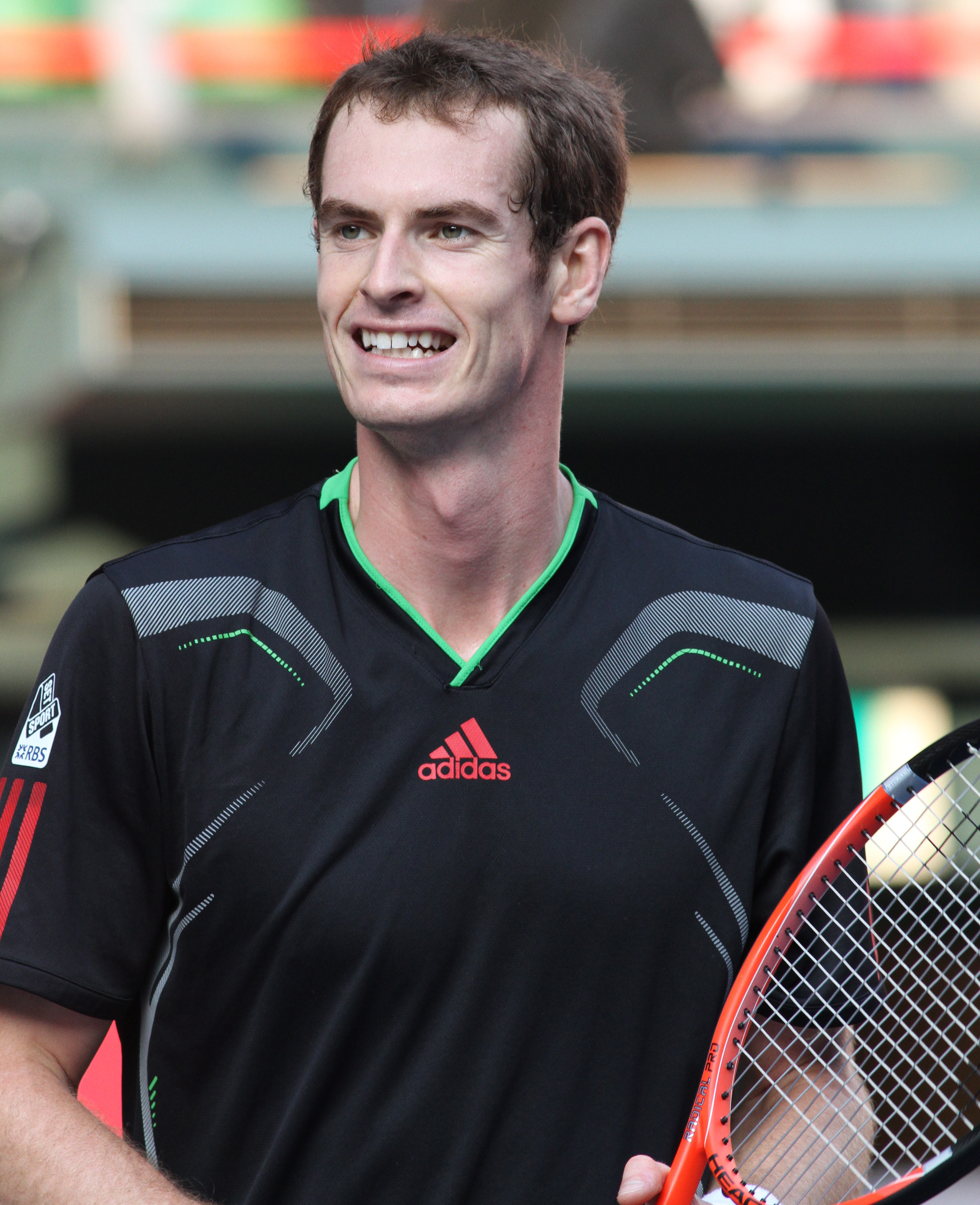
Novak Djokovic (2011) and Andy Murray (2011).

The Djokovic–Murray rivalry was a tennis rivalry between Novak Djokovic and Andy Murray. They met 36 times, and Djokovic leads 25–11 overall and 11–8 in finals. Ten of their encounters were played in majors, with Djokovic leading 8–2. Djokovic and Murray are one of two male pairs to have contested the finals of each of the four majors (Djokovic–Nadal is the other pair).

Djokovic leads on hard courts 20–8 and 5–1 on clay, while Murray won their two matches played on grass. The rivalry began highly competitive and remained so for many years. However, after Murray won the 2013 Wimbledon Championships over Djokovic in the final, Djokovic took a commanding lead, winning 14 of their last 17 encounters. Djokovic also leads their five-set matches at 2–1.

The two are almost the same age, Murray being a week older than Djokovic. They went to training camp together, and as juniors, Murray won the first match they played together. In 2006, both aged 19, Djokovic and Murray partnered in doubles at the Australian Open, losing in the first round. The rivalry became an important part of both men's careers. Between May and August 2013 and between May 2016 and June 2017, they were the world No. 1 and 2 in ATP rankings; Djokovic held the top spot throughout the entire first period and the second period until November 2016, when Murray claimed it. They were the 2015 and 2016 year-end top two players in the world. Their last meeting came in January 2017 at the Qatar Open (even though both players remained active through 2024), mainly due to Murray's subsequent string of injuries and decline from the peak of the sport.

Djokovic and Murray met each other a record four times in the final of the Australian Open, but their most notable encounter there was in the 2012 semifinals. Other notable matches contested include the 2011 Italian Open semifinals, 2012 US Open final, 2012 Shanghai Masters final, 2015 French Open semifinals and 2017 Qatar Open final.

After Murray's retirement from the sport at the 2024 Olympic Games, he served as Djokovic's head coach at the 2025 Australian Open.

== Notable matches ==
=== 2006 Madrid Masters round of 16 ===
This was the first professional match between Djokovic and Murray, in the round of 16 at the 2006 Madrid Masters. This was the first of 20 matches at ATP Tour Masters 1000 tournaments the two would play, with Djokovic being the winner here in three sets.

=== 2008 Cincinnati Masters final ===
The first tour-level final the two played came at the 2008 Western & Southern Open. This was Murray's first ATP 1000 final, and Djokovic's 6th. Murray beat Djokovic in straight sets, both in tiebreaks, to claim his first ATP World Tour Masters 1000 title.

=== 2011 Australian Open final ===
Djokovic and Murray first met in a Grand Slam tournament at the final of the 2011 Australian Open. Djokovic beat Murray in straight sets to win his second Australian Open title in just over 2 1/2 hours.

=== 2011 Italian Open semi-final ===
Their second professional meeting on clay came at the 2011 Italian Open. Djokovic was dominant in the first set, breaking Murray three times and winning 6–1. Murray then held his serve and broke Djokovic to win the second set 6 games to 3. Djokovic then rallied to a 3 to 1 lead in the deciding set but Murray rallied back to serve for the match at 5 games to 4, giving him the chance to inflict Djokovic's first defeat of the year and to snap Djokovic's 38 match winning streak. However, two double faults from Murray allowed Djokovic to break back and win the match in a deciding tiebreak. It was praised as an epic.

=== 2012 Australian Open semi-final ===
Djokovic and Murray met each other in the semifinals of the 2012 Australian Open, in one of the longest and closest fought matches the two have ever played, at 4 hours and 50 minutes long. Murray took a two sets to one lead in the third set, before Djokovic came back in the last two, claiming victory in five sets. It was the closest that Murray came to beating Djokovic at the Australian Open and has been praised as being one of the best matches between the two and an epic. Following its conclusion, journalist Jacob Steinberg stated that it was "the best match since the Wimbledon final in 2008". Djokovic later went on to defend his title against Rafael Nadal in another marathon match.

=== 2012 US Open final ===
This was the second Grand Slam final the two played, and the first time the two had met at the US Open. After a 4-hour, 54 minute long final, Murray defeated Djokovic to claim his first ever major title, making him the first British man to win a Grand Slam title since Fred Perry in 1936. Murray claimed the first two sets, the first in a 24-minute tiebreak, and the second by 7 games to 5 after being 4–0 up at one point, before Djokovic levelled the scoring to take the match into a deciding fifth set, in which Murray regained his prior momentum and emerged victorious. This match equals the record set by Ivan Lendl and Mats Wilander as the longest US Open final in history, as well as the second longest major final in the Open Era at the time, behind the 2012 Australian Open final earlier that year (which also featured Djokovic). It also featured the longest ever tie-break in a US Open final, with a 12–10 final score in the first set.

=== 2012 Shanghai Masters final ===
Murray was the two-time defending champion in Shanghai and was going for his third successive title, whilst Djokovic had just won the China Open the previous week. Andy Murray took a close first set before the second set went to a tiebreak. Murray had five championship points in the second set, but Djokovic saved them all, and won the tiebreak 13–11, going on to win the final set and claim the title. It has been described as an epic and one of the best matches in their rivalry, lasting 3 hours and 21 minutes.

=== 2013 Australian Open final ===
This was the second time (after 2011) Djokovic and Murray met in an Australian Open final. Djokovic was the two-time defending champion (having beaten Murray in 2011 and Nadal in 2012), while Murray looked to win his 2nd consecutive Grand Slam. Murray was coming off an exhausting five-set win over Roger Federer in the semifinals, while Djokovic breezed to an easy 89 minute, straight sets victory over David Ferrer. The first set was a tightly contested one. Djokovic had 5 break points, but failed to convert any of them, as Murray won the 1st set. Murray and Djokovic again went to a tiebreak in the next set, but Djokovic capitalized on a key double fault by Murray to win the 2nd set. The first two sets lasted a combined 2 hours and 13 minutes. From there, Djokovic took control and won in four sets, becoming the first man in the Open Era to win 3 straight Australian Open championships. The trophy was presented by former Australian Open winner Andre Agassi, whose record of four Australian Open titles overall Djokovic had matched.

=== 2013 Wimbledon final ===
Just 12 months after his loss to Roger Federer at the previous year's tournament, Murray made it through to his second consecutive final at Wimbledon, where he would face Djokovic in their fourth Grand Slam final. Murray fought back from a break down in both the second and third sets, winning the last 4 games of the match after being down by 4 games to 2. Leading by two sets and 5 games to 4 in the third, Murray raced into a 40–0 lead in the final game, gaining three championship points. However, not to be outdone, Djokovic fought back strongly, first to deuce, after which he held three separate break point opportunities. Murray saved each of these to claim the title, the first by any British man since Fred Perry in 1936. The victory meant Murray tied Djokovic at 2 wins each in Grand Slam finals, leading by 5 to 4 in their total finals head-to-head. In addition, the loss marked the first time in 80 Grand Slam matches that Djokovic had failed to win a set, his previous straight sets defeat coming against Tomas Berdych at Wimbledon in 2010. In the trophy ceremony immediately after the final, Murray said in his speech that the final game was "the toughest I've ever had to play in my career", and that his concentration was "so high" during the closing minutes of the match. Djokovic conceded that Murray was the better player on the day, and that he "absolutely deserved to win today".

=== 2014 US Open quarterfinal ===
This was the second time the two met at the US Open. The first two sets were tightly contested and split between each, both in tiebreaks after Murray made comebacks when down 4 games to 1 in the first set and 3 games to 1 in the second set. However, Murray's fitness dropped in the third set with stiffness in his back and hips, allowing Djokovic to break Murray twice and take the third set 6 games to 2. Both players held their serve in the fourth set until Djokovic broke Murray's serve when leading 5 games to 4, winning the match in four sets and advancing onto the semifinals. This loss resulted in Murray dropping out of the top 10 for the first time since 2008.

=== 2015 Australian Open final ===
This was the third time (after 2011 and 2013) that Djokovic and Murray met in an Australian Open final. Djokovic was the four-time champion (having won in 2008, 2011, 2012, 2013), while Murray had made his 4th Australian Open final. Djokovic was coming off an exhausting five-set win over Stanislas Wawrinka in the semifinals, while Murray beat Tomas Berdych in 4 sets. The first two sets were tightly contested. Djokovic took the first set in a tiebreak as a Murray backhand sailed long. In the second set, Murray made the push taking the set in a tiebreak, after failing to convert a set point earlier in the set. After Murray broke early in the third set, Djokovic would win twelve of the next thirteen games, including the last nine in a row, to take the match and the championship in four sets, becoming the first man in the Open era to win 5 Australian Open championships. The trophy was presented to him by six-time Australian Open champion Roy Emerson, who held the then-record of Australian Open titles.

=== 2015 French Open semi-final ===
This was their first meeting in the French Open. It was a five-set match played over the course of two days. Djokovic had ended Rafael Nadal's run of 39 consecutive victories in the French Open with a straight sets victory while Murray came off a four set victory against David Ferrer. With Nadal and Roger Federer's quarterfinal defeats guaranteeing a first time champion at the tournament, both players each had winning streaks entering the match, Djokovic with an overall 27 match winning streak while Murray with a 15 match winning streak on Clay. Djokovic broke Murray's serve once to win the first set and then broke Murray twice in the second set for a two set to love lead. However, despite Djokovic having break points in the third set for a possible straight sets victory, Murray battled back and broke Djokovic's serve at 5 games all to win the third set on serve. After two breaks of serve in the fourth set, the match was suspended for the day at 3 games all due to an approaching thunderstorm. The match then resumed the following day and Murray again broke Djokovic's serve at 5 games all and closed the set on serve to take it into a fifth set. However, with the match being similar to their one in the 2012 US Open, Djokovic won the fifth set comfortably, winning 6 of the last 7 games to reach his third final in the French Open, ending Murray's winning streak on clay and denying him a place for his first French Open final. Djokovic would then lose the final to Stan Wawrinka in four sets.

=== 2015 Canadian Open final ===
Djokovic headed into the Montreal final on an eight match winning streak against Murray, who had not beaten Djokovic since the 2013 Wimbledon final. Djokovic was seeking his fourth Canadian title (after 2007, 2011, 2012) with Murray looking for his third (after 2009 and 2010). The world No. 1 had also won the last 12 Masters finals in which he had competed, including wins at Indian Wells, Miami, Monte Carlo and Rome this year. Both players started strong, with Murray taking a lead, squandering it, and breaking back to win the set. Djokovic broke early to win set two. In the final set, Murray took an early lead which set up the pivotal fifth game. It lasted 15 minutes and had ten deuces, but Murray held on to extend his lead. Murray had three match points on Djokovic's serve but failed to convert, and he sealed the match on his own serve for a three set victory. This ended Djokovic's two year winning streak with Murray, who rose to world No. 2 again, overtaking Roger Federer.

=== 2016: The battle for the world number one ===
Djokovic and Murray met five times in 2016 and created history by taking the battle for world number 1 to the final match of the season. Djokovic and Murray contested the finals at both the Madrid and Rome Masters in May; these were the first two times that they contested a final on clay. Both dethroned each other as the defending champion, with Djokovic defeating Murray in Madrid by way of a three-set win and Murray reversing the result in Rome with a straight-sets victory. By winning in Rome, Murray became the first player other than Djokovic or any Spanish player to win in the Italian capital since Andre Agassi in 2002, and the first British male champion since Pat Hughes in 1931. After losing to Djokovic in Madrid, Murray trailed him by 9,025 points. Murray then went on a 58-4 streak for the rest of the season, including a loss to Djokovic at the French Open final 3–6, 6–1, 6–2, 6–4 who became the first man since 1969 to win 4 Grand Slam titles consecutively, completing the "Nole Slam". This was the first Major final since the 1984 French Open where the top 2 seeds met and neither had won the title yet.

Murray then went on to win Wimbledon, the Rio Olympics, two more Masters finals, and three 500 series events, plus a further Masters final appearance while Djokovic won one further Masters and reached the final of the US Open. Murray's victory at the Paris Masters elevated him to number 1 in the rankings for the first time in his career, ending Djokovic's 122 week run.

Djokovic and Murray met for the first time since the French Open final in the championship match of the season-concluding ATP World Tour Finals in London in November. Of the five meetings (all in championship matches) that took place between the pair in 2016, this one had added significance, as the winner would be the year-end world number one. This was the only time the year end number 1 had been contested between two players in the last match of the season, and the first time since Mats Wilander and Ivan Lendl met in the US Open final in 1988 that the number 1 spot had been decided between two players in a single match.

In Djokovic's case a win would have seen him win his fifth overall year-end title, just one short of the overall record held by Roger Federer and Pete Sampras; Murray, on the other hand, was shooting for his first year-end title, having reached the championship match for the first time. Ultimately, Murray won in straight sets, becoming the first man other than Djokovic, Federer or Nadal to finish the year at the top of the rankings since Andy Roddick in 2003.

=== 2017: Qatar Open final ===
Djokovic and Murray met each other for the last time at the 2017 Qatar Open. They were the top 2 players in the world at the time, with Murray being No. 1 and Djokovic No. 2. The final was a 3-hour thriller where both were going for their shots and had to dig deep to stay in the match. Murray saved multiple match points in the second set to force a decider but in the end it was not enough as Djokovic sealed the victory in the third, ending Murray's 28-match win streak. "It was a really, really thrilling performance from both of us. Just a great way to start the year," Djokovic said after the match.

== List of all matches ==
Legend (2006–2008)	Legend (2009–present)	Djokovic	Murray
Grand Slam	Grand Slam	8	2
Tennis Masters Cup	ATP World Tour Finals	1	1
ATP Masters Series	ATP World Tour Masters 1000	14	6
ATP International Series Gold	ATP World Tour 500 Series	1	1
ATP International Series	ATP World Tour 250 Series	1	0
Olympic Games	Olympic Games	0	1
Total		25	11

=== Singles (36) ===
Djokovic 25 – Murray 11

No.	Year	Tournament	Series	Surface	Round	Winner	Score	Length	Sets	Djokovic	Murray
1.	2006	(Spain) Madrid Open	Masters	Hard (i)	Last 16	Djokovic	1–6, 7–5, 6–3	2:11	3/3	1	0
2.	2007	(United States) Indian Wells Masters	Masters	Hard	Semifinals	Djokovic	6–2, 6–3	1:03	2/3	2	0
3.	2007	(United States) Miami Open	Masters	Hard	Semifinals	Djokovic	6–1, 6–0	1:03	2/3	3	0
4.	2008	(Monaco) Monte-Carlo Masters	Masters	Clay	Last 16	Djokovic	6–0, 6–4	1:18	2/3	4	0
5.	2008	(Canada) Canadian Open	Masters	Hard	Quarterfinals	Murray	6–3, 7–6^{(7–3)}	1:45	2/3	4	1
6.	2008	(United States) Cincinnati Masters	Masters	Hard	Final	Murray	7–6^{(7–4)}, 7–6^{(7–5)}	2:23	2/3	4	2
7.	2009	(United States) Miami Open	Masters	Hard	Final	Murray	6–2, 7–5	2:05	2/3	4	3
8.	2011	(Australia) Australian Open	Major	Hard	Final	Djokovic	6–4, 6–2, 6–3	2:39	3/5	5	3
9.	2011	(Italy) Italian Open	Masters	Clay	Semifinals	Djokovic	6–1, 3–6, 7–6^{(7–2)}	3:02	3/3	6	3
10.	2011	(United States) Cincinnati Masters	Masters	Hard	Final	Murray	6–4, 3–0 RET	1:12	2/3	6	4
11.	2012	(Australia) Australian Open	Major	Hard	Semifinals	Djokovic	6–3, 3–6, 6–7^{(4–7)}, 6–1, 7–5	4:50	5/5	7	4
12.	2012	(United Arab Emirates) Dubai Championships	500	Hard	Semifinals	Murray	6–2, 7–5	1:23	2/3	7	5
13.	2012	(United States) Miami Open	Masters	Hard	Final	Djokovic	6–1, 7–6^{(7–4)}	2:18	2/3	8	5
14.	2012	(United Kingdom) Summer Olympics	Olympics	Grass	Semifinals	Murray	7–5, 7–5	2:00	2/3	8	6
15.	2012	(United States) US Open	Major	Hard	Final	Murray	7–6^{(12–10)}, 7–5, 2–6, 3–6, 6–2	4:54	5/5	8	7
16.	2012	(China) Shanghai Masters	Masters	Hard	Final	Djokovic	5–7, 7–6^{(13–11)}, 6–3	3:22	3/3	9	7
17.	2012	(United Kingdom) ATP World Tour Finals	Tour Finals	Hard (i)	Round Robin	Djokovic	4–6, 6–3, 7–5	2:34	3/3	10	7
18.	2013	(Australia) Australian Open	Major	Hard	Final	Djokovic	6–7^{(2–7)}, 7–6^{(7–3)}, 6–3, 6–2	3:40	4/5	11	7
19.	2013	(United Kingdom) Wimbledon	Major	Grass	Final	Murray	6–4, 7–5, 6–4	3:09	3/5	11	8
20.	2014	(United States) Miami Open	Masters	Hard	Quarterfinals	Djokovic	7–5, 6–3	1:31	2/3	12	8
21.	2014	(United States) US Open	Major	Hard	Quarterfinals	Djokovic	7–6^{(7–1)}, 6–7^{(1–7)}, 6–2, 6–4	3:33	4/5	13	8
22.	2014	China Open	500	Hard	Semifinals	Djokovic	6–3, 6–4	1:36	2/3	14	8
23.	2014	(France) Paris Masters	Masters	Hard (i)	Quarterfinals	Djokovic	7–5, 6–2	1:42	2/3	15	8
24.	2015	(Australia) Australian Open	Major	Hard	Final	Djokovic	7–6^{(7–5)}, 6–7^{(4–7)}, 6–3, 6–0	3:39	4/5	16	8
25.	2015	(United States) Indian Wells Masters	Masters	Hard	Semifinals	Djokovic	6–2, 6–3	1:28	2/3	17	8
26.	2015	(United States) Miami Open	Masters	Hard	Final	Djokovic	7–6^{(7–3)}, 4–6, 6–0	2:47	3/3	18	8
27.	2015	(France) French Open	Major	Clay	Semifinals	Djokovic	6–3, 6–3, 5–7, 5–7, 6–1	4:09	5/5	19	8
28.	2015	(Canada) Canadian Open	Masters	Hard	Final	Murray	6–4, 4–6, 6–3	3:00	3/3	19	9
29.	2015	(China) Shanghai Masters	Masters	Hard	Semifinals	Djokovic	6–1, 6–3	1:07	2/3	20	9
30.	2015	(France) Paris Masters	Masters	Hard (i)	Final	Djokovic	6–2, 6–4	1:32	2/3	21	9
31.	2016	(Australia) Australian Open	Major	Hard	Final	Djokovic	6–1, 7–5, 7–6^{(7–3)}	2:53	3/5	22	9
32.	2016	(Spain) Madrid Open	Masters	Clay	Final	Djokovic	6–2, 3–6, 6–3	2:06	3/3	23	9
33.	2016	(Italy) Italian Open	Masters	Clay	Final	Murray	6–3, 6–3	1:35	2/3	23	10
34.	2016	(France) French Open	Major	Clay	Final	Djokovic	3–6, 6–1, 6–2, 6–4	3:03	4/5	24	10
35.	2016	(United Kingdom) ATP World Tour Finals	Tour Finals	Hard (i)	Final	Murray	6–3, 6–4	1:42	2/3	24	11
36.	2017	Qatar Open	250	Hard	Final	Djokovic	6–3, 5–7, 6–4	2:54	3/3	25	11
—	2022	(Spain) Madrid Open	Masters	Clay	Last 16	(Djokovic)	Walkover	N/A	N/A	25	11

== Analysis ==
=== Head-to-head tallies ===
- All matches: (36) Djokovic, 25–11
- All finals: Djokovic, 11–8
  - Grand Slam matches: Djokovic, 8–2
  - ATP World Tour Finals matches: Tied, 1–1
  - ATP World Tour Masters 1000 matches: Djokovic, 14–6
  - Olympic matches: Murray, 1–0
  - Best of 3 sets matches: Djokovic, 17–9
  - Best of 5 sets matches: Djokovic, 8–2
  - Matches lasting 5 sets: Djokovic, 2–1
  - Grand Slam finals: Djokovic, 5–2
  - ATP World Tour Masters 1000 finals: Tied, 5–5
  - ATP World Tour Finals finals: Murray, 1–0

=== Results on each court surface ===
- Clay courts: Djokovic, 5–1
- Hard courts: Djokovic, 20–8
  - Outdoor: Djokovic, 16–7
  - Indoor: Djokovic, 4–1
- Grass courts: Murray, 2–0

== Exhibition matches ==
=== Djokovic—Murray (3–0) ===
No.	Year	Tournament	Surface	Round	Winner	Score	Djokovic	Murray
1.	2012	(United Kingdom) Boodles Challenge	Grass	Exhibition	Djokovic	6–4, 6–4	1	0
2.	2014	(United States) New York	Hard	Exhibition	Djokovic	6–3, 7–6^{(7–2)}	2	0
3.	2014	(United Kingdom) London	Hard	Exhibition	Djokovic	8–5	3	0
—	2015	(United Arab Emirates) Abu Dhabi	Hard	Final	Murray	Walkover	3	0

== Performance timeline comparison (Grand Slam tournaments) ==
Key
**W**	F	SF	QF	#R	RR	Q#	DNQ	A	NH

(W) winner; (F) finalist; (SF) semifinalist; (QF) quarterfinalist; (#R) rounds 4, 3, 2, 1; (RR) round-robin stage; (Q#) qualification round; (DNQ) did not qualify; (A) absent; (NH) not held; (SR) strike rate (events won / competed); (W–L) win–loss record.
To avoid confusion and double counting, these charts are updated at the conclusion of a tournament or when the player's participation has ended.
- **Bold** = players met during this tournament

=== 2005–2010 ===
Player	2005				2006				2007				2008				2009				2010			
Player	AUS	FRA	WIM	USA	AUS	FRA	WIM	USA	AUS	FRA	WIM	USA	AUS	FRA	WIM	USA	AUS	FRA	WIM	USA	AUS	FRA	WIM	USA
(Serbia) **Novak Djokovic**	1R	2R	3R	3R	1R	QF	4R	3R	4R	SF	SF	F	W	SF	2R	SF	QF	3R	QF	SF	QF	QF	SF	F
(United Kingdom) **Andy Murray**	A	A	3R	2R	1R	1R	4R	4R	4R	A	A	3R	1R	3R	QF	F	4R	QF	SF	4R	F	4R	SF	3R

=== 2011–2016 ===
Player	2011				2012				2013				2014				2015				2016			
Player	AUS	FRA	WIM	USA	AUS	FRA	WIM	USA	AUS	FRA	WIM	USA	AUS	FRA	WIM	USA	AUS	FRA	WIM	USA	AUS	FRA	WIM	USA
(Serbia) **Novak Djokovic**	**W**	SF	W	W	**W**	F	SF	**F**	**W**	SF	**F**	F	QF	F	W	**SF**	**W**	**F**	W	W	**W**	**W**	3R	F
(United Kingdom) **Andy Murray**	**F**	SF	SF	SF	**SF**	QF	F	**W**	**F**	A	**W**	QF	QF	SF	QF	**QF**	**F**	**SF**	SF	4R	**F**	**F**	W	QF

=== 2017–2022 ===
Player	2017				2018				2019				2020				2021				2022			
Player	AUS	FRA	WIM	USA	AUS	FRA	WIM	USA	AUS	FRA	WIM	USA	AUS	FRA	WIM	USA	AUS	FRA	WIM	USA	AUS	FRA	WIM	USA
(Serbia) **Novak Djokovic**	2R	QF	QF	A	4R	QF	W	W	W	SF	W	4R	W	F	NH	4R	W	W	W	F	A	QF	W	A
(United Kingdom) **Andy Murray**	4R	SF	QF	A	A	A	A	2R	1R	A	A	A	A	1R	NH	2R	A	A	3R	1R	2R	A	2R	3R

=== 2023–2024 ===
Player	2023				2024			
Player	AUS	FRA	WIM	USA	AUS	FRA	WIM	USA
(Serbia) **Novak Djokovic**	W	W	F	W	SF	QF	F	3R
(United Kingdom) **Andy Murray**	3R	A	2R	2R	1R	1R	A	A

=== Djokovic–Murray Grand Slam tournament era (2008–2023) ===
Year	Australian Open	French Open	Wimbledon	US Open
2008	(Serbia) Novak Djokovic	(Spain) Rafael Nadal	(Spain) Rafael Nadal	(Switzerland) Roger Federer
2009	(Spain) Rafael Nadal	(Switzerland) Roger Federer	(Switzerland) Roger Federer	(Argentina) Juan Martín del Potro
2010	(Switzerland) Roger Federer	(Spain) Rafael Nadal	(Spain) Rafael Nadal	(Spain) Rafael Nadal
2011	(Serbia) Novak Djokovic	(Spain) Rafael Nadal	(Serbia) Novak Djokovic	(Serbia) Novak Djokovic
2012	(Serbia) Novak Djokovic	(Spain) Rafael Nadal	(Switzerland) Roger Federer	(United Kingdom) Andy Murray
2013	(Serbia) Novak Djokovic	(Spain) Rafael Nadal	(United Kingdom) Andy Murray	(Spain) Rafael Nadal
2014	(Switzerland) Stan Wawrinka	(Spain) Rafael Nadal	(Serbia) Novak Djokovic	(Croatia) Marin Čilić
2015	(Serbia) Novak Djokovic	(Switzerland) Stan Wawrinka	(Serbia) Novak Djokovic	(Serbia) Novak Djokovic
2016	(Serbia) Novak Djokovic	(Serbia) Novak Djokovic	(United Kingdom) Andy Murray	(Switzerland) Stan Wawrinka
2017	(Switzerland) Roger Federer	(Spain) Rafael Nadal	(Switzerland) Roger Federer	(Spain) Rafael Nadal
2018	(Switzerland) Roger Federer	(Spain) Rafael Nadal	(Serbia) Novak Djokovic	(Serbia) Novak Djokovic
2019	(Serbia) Novak Djokovic	(Spain) Rafael Nadal	(Serbia) Novak Djokovic	(Spain) Rafael Nadal
2020	(Serbia) Novak Djokovic	(Spain) Rafael Nadal	Tournament cancelled*	(Austria) Dominic Thiem
2021	(Serbia) Novak Djokovic	(Serbia) Novak Djokovic	(Serbia) Novak Djokovic	(Russia) Daniil Medvedev
2022	(Spain) Rafael Nadal	(Spain) Rafael Nadal	(Serbia) Novak Djokovic	(Spain) Carlos Alcaraz
2023	(Serbia) Novak Djokovic	(Serbia) Novak Djokovic	(Spain) Carlos Alcaraz	(Serbia) Novak Djokovic

* Due to the COVID-19 pandemic, the 2020 Wimbledon Championships of the tournament was cancelled.

=== Combined singles performance timeline (best result) ===
Tournament	2005	2006	2007	2008	2009	2010	2011	2012	2013	2014	2015	2016	2017	2018	2019	2020	2021	2022	2023	2024	SR
**Grand Slam tournaments**
Australian Open	1R^{D}	1R^{DM}	4R^{DM}	**W****^{D}**	QF^{D}	F^{M}	**W****^{D}**	**W****^{D}**	**W****^{D}**	QF^{DM}	**W****^{D}**	**W****^{D}**	4R^{M}	4R^{D}	**W****^{D}**	**W****^{D}**	**W****^{D}**	2R^{M}	**W****^{D}**	SF^{D}	10 / 20
French Open	2R^{D}	QF^{D}	SF^{D}	SF^{D}	QF^{M}	QF^{D}	SF^{DM}	F^{D}	SF^{D}	F^{D}	F^{D}	**W****^{D}**	SF^{M}	QF^{D}	SF^{D}	F^{D}	**W****^{D}**	QF^{D}	**W****^{D}**	QF^{D}	3 / 20
Wimbledon	3R^{DM}	4R^{DM}	SF^{D}	QF^{M}	SF^{M}	SF^{DM}	**W****^{D}**	F^{M}	**W****^{M}**	**W****^{D}**	**W****^{D}**	**W****^{M}**	QF^{DM}	**W****^{D}**	**W****^{D}**	NH	**W****^{D}**	**W****^{D}**	F^{D}	F^{D}	9 / 19
US Open	3R^{D}	4R^{M}	F^{D}	F^{M}	SF^{D}	F^{D}	**W****^{D}**	**W****^{M}**	F^{D}	SF^{D}	**W****^{D}**	F^{D}	A	**W****^{D}**	4R^{D}	4R^{D}	F^{D}	3R^{M}	**W****^{D}**	3R^{D}	5 / 19

=== ATP rankings ===
==== Year-end ranking timeline ====
Player	2003	2004	2005	2006	2007	2008	2009	2010	2011	2012	2013	2014	2015	2016	2017	2018	2019	2020	2021	2022	2023	2024
(Serbia) Novak Djokovic	679	186	78	16	3	3	3	3	**1**	**1**	2	**1**	**1**	2	12	**1**	2	**1**	**1**	5	**1**	7
(United Kingdom) Andy Murray	540	411	63	17	11	4	4	4	4	3	4	6	2	**1**	16	240	125	122	134	49	42	–

=== Career evolution ===
Novak Djokovic and Andy Murray were born one week apart (22 and 15 May 1987, respectively). Therefore, they have the same age at the end of a season.

- updated Monday 5 August 2024

Age (end of season)		18	19	20	21	22	23	24	25	26	27	28	29	30	31	32	33	34	35	36	37
Season		2005	2006	2007	2008	2009	2010	2011	2012	2013	2014	2015	2016	2017	2018	2019	2020	2021	2022	2023	2024
Grand Slam titles	Djokovic	0	0	0	1	1	1	4	5	6	7	10	12	12	14	16	17	20	21	24	(24)
Grand Slam titles	Murray	0	0	0	0	0	0	0	1	2	2	2	3	3	3	3	3	3	3	3	3
Grand Slam match wins	Djokovic	5	14	33	51	66	85	110	134	158	180	207	228	237	258	280	296	323	334	361	(375)
Grand Slam match wins	Murray	3	9	14	26	41	57	78	100	117	134	153	176	188	189	189	190	192	196	200	200
Total titles	Djokovic	0	2	7	11	16	18	28	34	41	48	59	66	68	72	77	81	86	91	98	(99)
Total titles	Murray	0	1	3	8	14	16	21	24	28	31	35	44	45	45	46	46	46	46	46	46
Total match wins	Djokovic	13	53	121	185	263	324	394	469	541	604	686	751	783	836	893	934	989	1031	1087	(1116)
Total match wins	Murray	14	54	97	155	221	267	323	379	422	481	552	630	655	662	673	676	691	715	733	739
Ranking	Djokovic	78	16	3	3	3	3	1	1	2	1	1	2	12	1	2	1	1	5	1	(2)
Ranking	Murray	63	17	11	4	4	4	4	3	4	6	2	1	16	240	125	122	134	49	42	(136)
Weeks at number 1	Djokovic	0	0	0	0	0	0	26	62	101	127	179	223	223	232	275	301	353	373	405	(428)
Weeks at number 1	Murray	0	0	0	0	0	0	0	0	0	0	0	8	41	41	41	41	41	41	41	41

== See also ==
- Big Four
- Djokovic–Federer rivalry
- Djokovic–Nadal rivalry
- List of tennis rivalries
- Andy Murray career statistics
- Novak Djokovic career statistics
