= 2017 Qatar ExxonMobil Open – Singles =

Singles
- 2017 Qatar ExxonMobil Open

Final
- Champion: (Serbia) Novak Djokovic
- Runner-up: (United Kingdom) Andy Murray
- Score: 6–3, 5–7, 6–4

Details
- Draw: 32 (4 Q / 3 WC )
- Seeds: 8

Events
| Singles | Doubles |
- ATP Qatar Open

Defending champion Novak Djokovic defeated Andy Murray in the final, 6–3, 5–7, 6–4 to win the singles tennis title at the 2017 Qatar Open. Djokovic saved five match points en route to the title, in the semifinals against Fernando Verdasco. The final marked Djokovic and Murray's 36th and final professional meeting; Djokovic won to end their head-to-head at 25–11 in his favor.

Murray became the first player to reach the ATP Qatar Open final four times; however, his loss in the final ended his 28-match winning streak dating back to the 2016 Davis Cup semifinals.

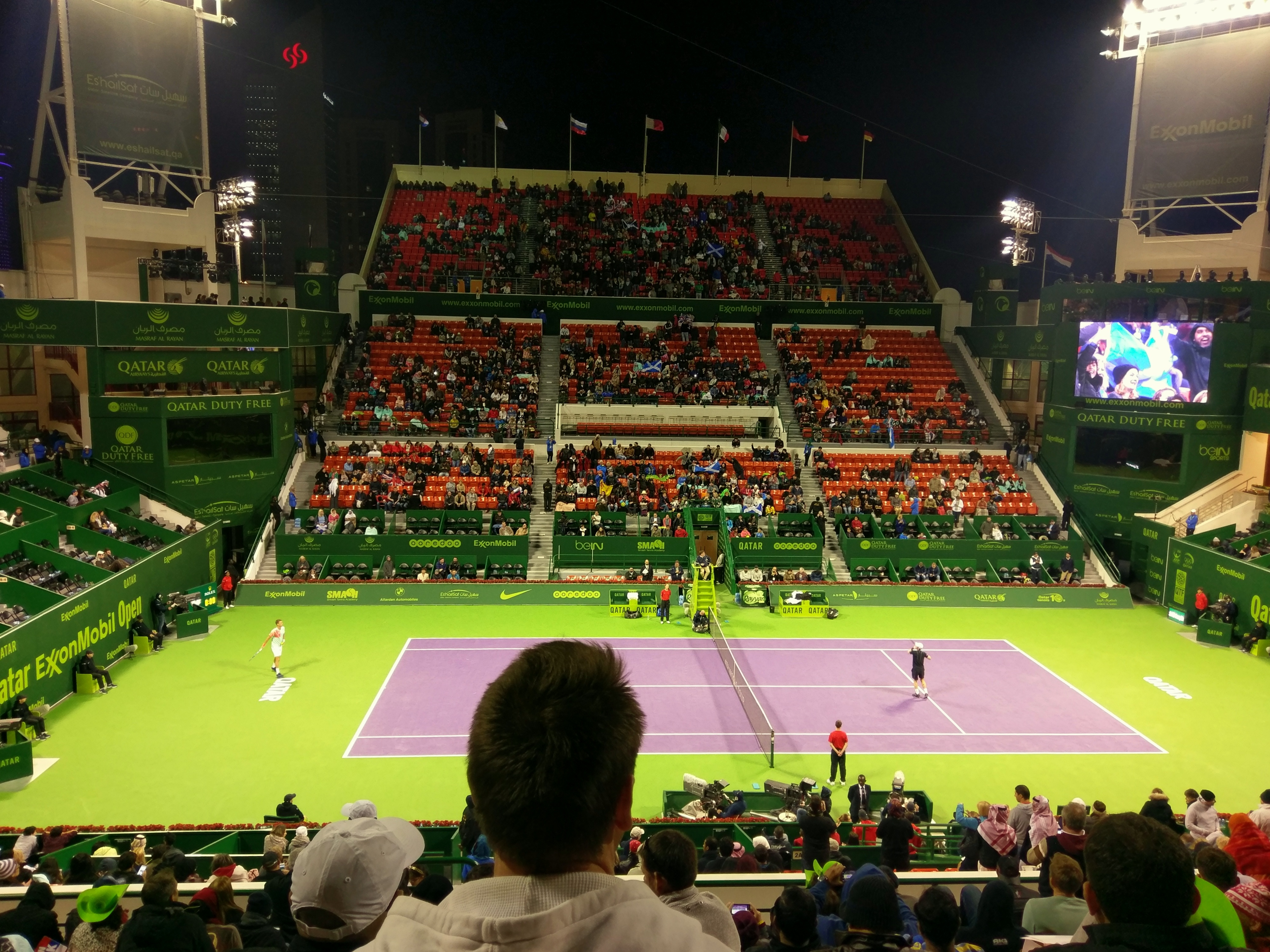
Murray vs Berdych during the semifinal round

== Seeds ==
1. (United Kingdom) Andy Murray (final)
2. (Serbia) Novak Djokovic (champion)
3. (Czech Republic) Tomáš Berdych (semifinals)
4. (Belgium) David Goffin (second round)
5. (France) Jo-Wilfried Tsonga (quarterfinals)
6. (Croatia) Ivo Karlović (quarterfinals)
7. (Germany) Philipp Kohlschreiber (second round)
8. (Cyprus) Marcos Baghdatis (first round, retired)

== Draw ==
=== Finals ===
Semifinals
1 | (United Kingdom) Andy Murray | 6 | 6
3 | (Czech Republic) Tomáš Berdych | 3 | 4
(Spain) Fernando Verdasco | 6 | 6^{7} | 3
2 | (Serbia) Novak Djokovic | 4 | 7^{9} | 6

Final
1 | (United Kingdom) Andy Murray | 3 | 7 | 4
2 | (Serbia) Novak Djokovic | 6 | 5 | 6

=== Top half ===
First round
1 | (United Kingdom) A Murray | 6 | 7^{7}
(France) J Chardy | 0 | 6^{2}
(Austria) G Melzer | 6^{2} | 6 | 6
(France) P-H Mathieu | 7^{7} | 3 | 2
(Italy) P Lorenzi | 6^{2} | 6 | 3
(Spain) N Almagro | 7^{7} | 4 | 6
(Tunisia) M Jaziri | 2 | 6^{3}
7 | (Germany) P Kohlschreiber | 6 | 7^{7}
3 | (Czech Republic) T Berdych | 7^{7} | 6
Q | (Italy) A Giannessi | 6^{1} | 2
WC | (Turkey) A Yüksel | 3 | 3
(Czech Republic) J Veselý | 6 | 6
(Argentina) F Bagnis | 1 | 7^{7} | 4
(Germany) D Brown | 6 | 6^{2} | 6
(Russia) A Kuznetsov | 1 | 6 | 2
5 | (France) J-W Tsonga | 6 | 4 | 6

Second round
1 | (United Kingdom) A Murray | 7^{8} | 7
(Austria) G Melzer | 6^{6} | 5
(Spain) N Almagro | 7^{7} | 7^{8}
7 | (Germany) P Kohlschreiber | 6^{5} | 6^{6}
3 | (Czech Republic) T Berdych | 7^{7} | 1 | 6
(Czech Republic) J Veselý | 6^{5} | 6 | 1
(Germany) D Brown | 1 | 3
5 | (France) J-W Tsonga | 6 | 6

Quarterfinals
1 | (United Kingdom) A Murray | 7^{7} | 7
(Spain) N Almagro | 6^{4} | 5
3 | (Czech Republic) T Berdych | 7 | 6
5 | (France) J-W Tsonga | 5 | 3

Semifinals
1 | (United Kingdom) A Murray | 6 | 6
3 | (Czech Republic) T Berdych | 3 | 4

=== Bottom half ===
First round
6 | (Croatia) I Karlović | 7^{7} | 7^{7}
(Ukraine) I Marchenko | 6^{5} | 6^{0}
WC | (Qatar) MS Zayid | 1 | 3
(Russia) K Khachanov | 6 | 6
Q | (Canada) V Pospisil | 5 | 0
(Spain) F Verdasco | 7 | 6
(Netherlands) R Haase | 6^{4} | 2
4 | (Belgium) D Goffin | 7^{7} | 6
8 | (Cyprus) M Baghdatis | 4 | 3^{r}
Q | (Czech Republic) R Štěpánek | 6 | 5
WC | (Belgium) A De Greef | 6^{8} | 7 | 6
Q | (Egypt) M Safwat | 7^{10} | 5 | 4
(Argentina) H Zeballos | 6^{3} | 6 | 7^{11}
(Germany) F Mayer | 7^{7} | 4 | 6^{9}
(Germany) J-L Struff | 6^{1} | 3
2 | (Serbia) N Djokovic | 7^{7} | 6

Second round
6 | (Croatia) I Karlović | 7^{7} | 7^{7}
(Russia) K Khachanov | 6^{3} | 6^{3}
(Spain) F Verdasco | 6 | 7^{8}
4 | (Belgium) D Goffin | 1 | 6^{6}
Q | (Czech Republic) R Štěpánek | 6 | 6
WC | (Belgium) A De Greef | 3 | 2
(Argentina) H Zeballos | 3 | 4
2 | (Serbia) N Djokovic | 6 | 6

Quarterfinals
6 | (Croatia) I Karlović | 2 | 5
(Spain) F Verdasco | 6 | 7
Q | (Czech Republic) R Štěpánek | 3 | 3
2 | (Serbia) N Djokovic | 6 | 6

Semifinals
(Spain) F Verdasco | 6 | 6^{7} | 3
2 | (Serbia) N Djokovic | 4 | 7^{9} | 6

== Qualifying ==
=== Seeds ===
1. (Georgia (country)) Nikoloz Basilashvili (qualifying competition)
2. (Czech Republic) Radek Štěpánek (qualified)
3. (Switzerland) Marco Chiudinelli (first round)
4. (Italy) Thomas Fabbiano (first round)
5. (Russia) Evgeny Donskoy (first round)
6. (Japan) Taro Daniel (first round)
7. (Italy) Alessandro Giannessi (qualified)
8. (Canada) Vasek Pospisil (qualified)

=== Qualifiers ===
1. (Canada) Vasek Pospisil
2. (Czech Republic) Radek Štěpánek
3. (Italy) Alessandro Giannessi
4. (Egypt) Mohamed Safwat

=== Qualifying draw ===
==== First qualifier ====
First round
1 | (Georgia (country)) Nikoloz Basilashvili | 6 | 7
(Italy) Luca Vanni | 1 | 5
WC | (Qatar) Jabor Al-Mutawa | 2 | 2
8 | (Canada) Vasek Pospisil | 6 | 6

Qualifying competition
1 | (Georgia (country)) Nikoloz Basilashvili | 2 | 1
8 | (Canada) Vasek Pospisil | 6 | 6

==== Second qualifier ====
First round
2 | (Czech Republic) Radek Štěpánek | 5 | 7 | 6
(Italy) Lorenzo Giustino | 7 | 5 | 4
(Spain) Enrique López-Pérez | 6 | 6
5 | (Russia) Evgeny Donskoy | 4 | 4

Qualifying competition
2 | (Czech Republic) Radek Štěpánek | 6 | 6
(Spain) Enrique López-Pérez | 1 | 4

==== Third qualifier ====
First round
3 | (Switzerland) Marco Chiudinelli | 4 | 6 | 1
(Bosnia and Herzegovina) Mirza Bašić | 6 | 0 | 6
WC | (Qatar) Mousa Shanan Zayed | 2 | 1
7 | (Italy) Alessandro Giannessi | 6 | 6

Qualifying competition
(Bosnia and Herzegovina) Mirza Bašić | 4 | 2
7 | (Italy) Alessandro Giannessi | 6 | 6

==== Fourth qualifier ====
First round
4 | (Italy) Thomas Fabbiano | 7^{7} | 3 | 1
(France) Vincent Millot | 6^{3} | 6 | 6
(Egypt) Mohamed Safwat | 7^{7} | 6
6 | (Japan) Taro Daniel | 6^{1} | 2

Qualifying competition
(France) Vincent Millot | 3 | 6 | 2
(Egypt) Mohamed Safwat | 6 | 0 | 6
