= 2012 US Open – Men's singles final =

Championship tennis match in New York

US Open Men's Final
- (United Kingdom) Andy Murray (3) vs. (Serbia) Novak Djokovic (2)
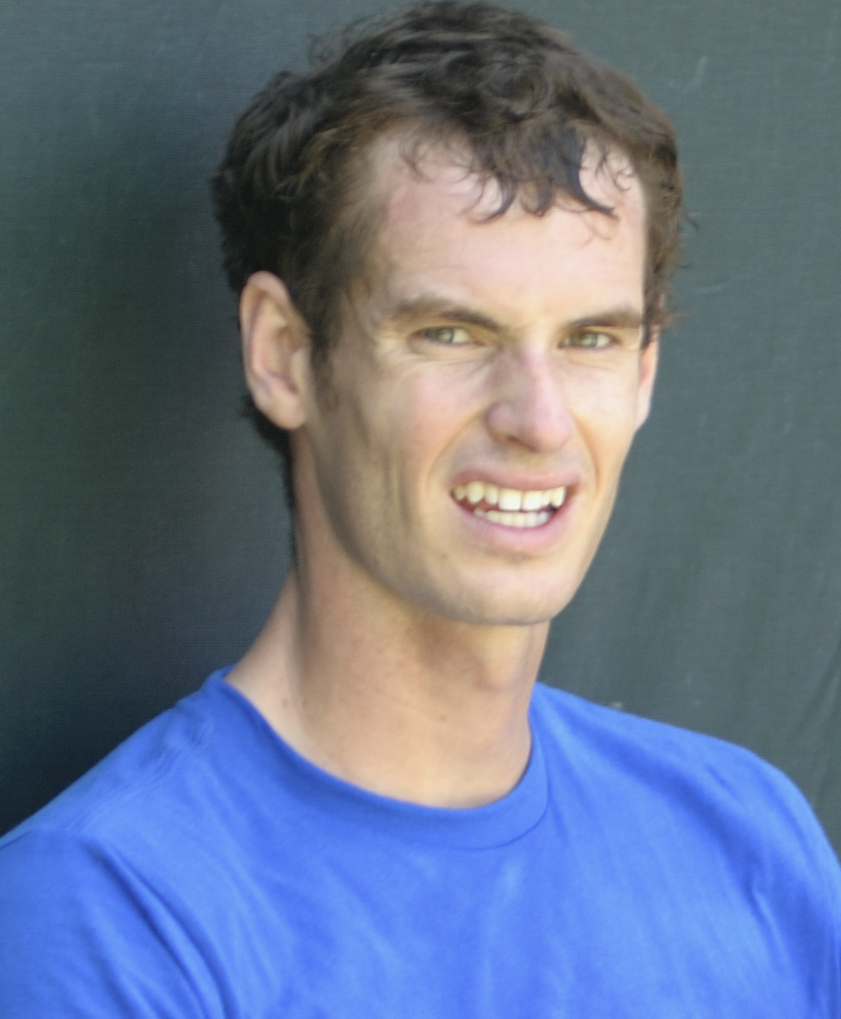
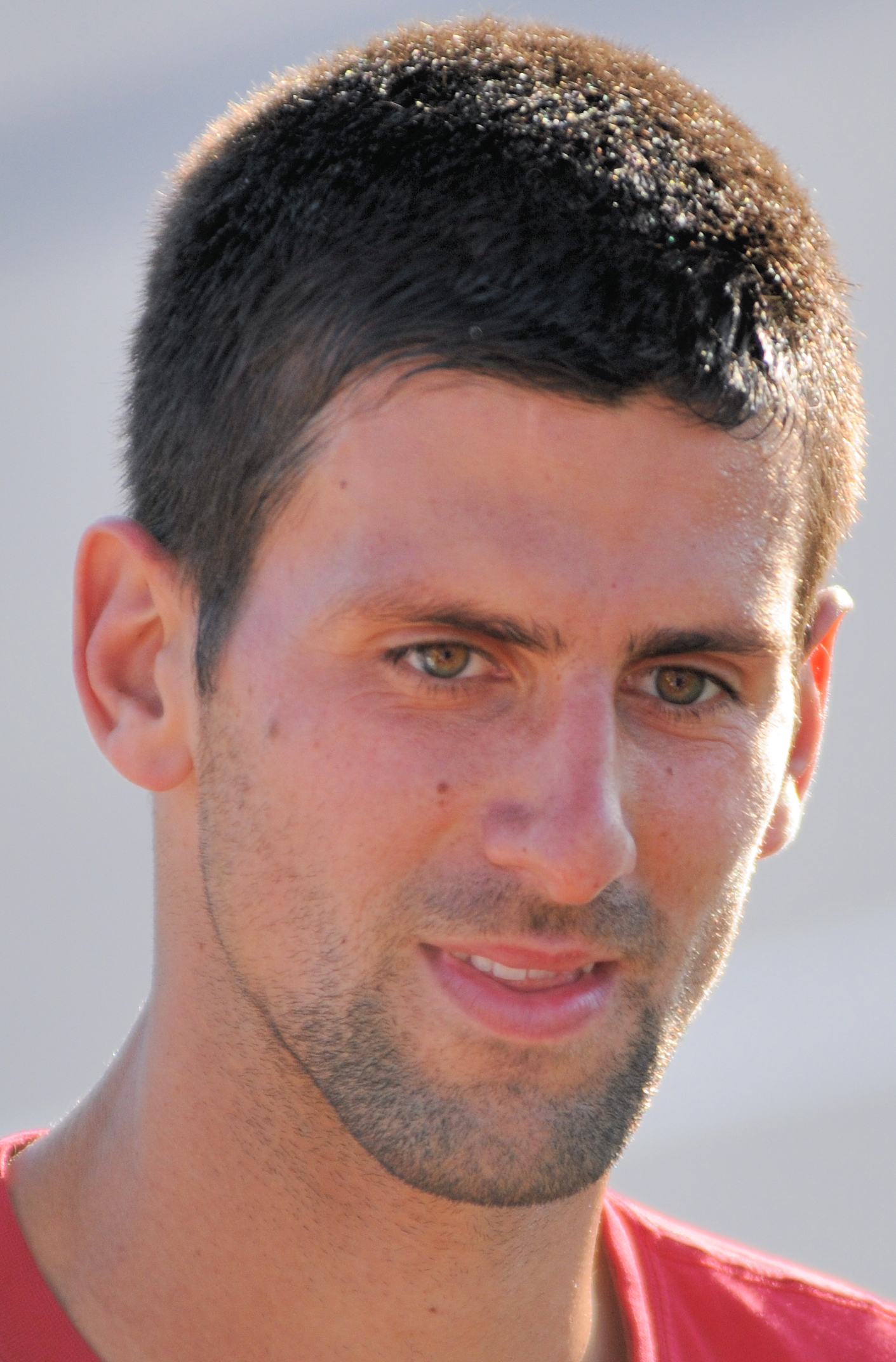
- Andy Murray (left) and Novak Djokovic (right)
Set	1	2	3	4	5
(United Kingdom) Andy Murray	7^{12}	7	2	3	6
(Serbia) Novak Djokovic	6^{10}	5	6	6	2
- Date: September 10, 2012
- Tournament: US Open
- Location: New York City, U.S.
- Chair umpire: Jake Garner
- Duration: 4 hours 54 minutes

The 2012 US Open Men's Singles final was the championship tennis match of the Men's Singles tournament at the 2012 US Open. In the final, Andy Murray defeated defending champion Novak Djokovic 7–6^{(12–10)}, 7–5, 2–6, 3–6, 6–2 to win the match. It is the joint longest US Open men's final in history, lasting 4 hours and 54 minutes (equaling the 1988 US Open final played by Ivan Lendl and Mats Wilander), and the fourth-longest men's final in the Open era.

By winning the 2012 US Open, Murray became the first British man since Fred Perry in 1936 to win a Grand Slam singles title, and the first British man in the Open Era to do so. The match is a significant part of the rivalry between the two players. This match also marked a milestone for Murray, as it was his 100th match win at a Grand Slam tournament.

== Match ==
Murray won the first set in what would be the longest tiebreak in a men's championship match, taking 24 minutes to win the tie-break 7–6^{(12–10)}. The first set lasted 87 minutes (including the 24-minute tiebreak), featured four breaks of serve in the first four games of the match and a 54-shot rally which Djokovic won in the sixth game. Additionally, the first set tie-break featured two 30-plus shot rallies and Murray needed six set points to finally take out the first set.

The second set appeared to head in Murray's direction as he went 4–0 up and then 5–2 before Djokovic won the next three games to level the set at 5–all. Murray then held his serve to edge ahead 6–5, then broke Djokovic's serve to win the set 7–5 and go two sets up in the final.

The third set was the shortest of the final; Djokovic winning the third set 6–2 after breaking Murray twice in the set. He also took the fourth set 6–3 to level the match at two sets all. Thus, he was in a position where he could become the first man since Gastón Gaudio in 2004 to win a championship match after losing the first two sets. On that occasion, Gaudio won the 2004 French Open final over Guillermo Coria after losing the first two sets 6–0 and 6–3.

The final set was also a short affair, with Murray opening up a sizeable lead and putting himself in a strong position to serve for the championship at 5–2. Murray served out to gain a triple championship point, and after Djokovic saved the first, he emerged victorious on the second after a Djokovic return sailed just over the baseline. Murray claimed his first Grand Slam title after four previous final defeats, emulating his coach Ivan Lendl, who also won his first major title after four previous final defeats. His victory also denied Djokovic the chance to claim the biggest pay day in tennis history, where he could have won $US2.4 million having claimed the 2012 US Open Series after winning the Rogers Cup and finishing runner-up to Roger Federer at Cincinnati.

== Statistics ==
Category	Murray	Djokovic
1st serve %	65%	62%
Aces	5	7
Double faults	4	5
Unforced errors	56	65
Winners	31	40
Break point conversions	8 of 17 = 47%	9 of 18 = 50%
Total points won	160	155

_{Source}

== Djokovic about the match ==
Djokovic praised Murray after the match, conceding that he was the better player on the day, and stating that he felt that Murray deserved this championship:

"He deserved to win this grand slam more than anybody because over the years he has been a top player, he has been so close, lost four finals. Now he has won it so I would like to congratulate him. Definitely happy that he won it. Us four (Federer, Nadal, Djokovic and Murray), we are taking this game to another level. It's really nice to be part of such a strong men's tennis era."

== Reaction ==
Murray's US Open victory was met with a positive reaction around the world. In the United Kingdom alone, up to 1.5 million people had stayed up to watch the match, which started at 9:00 p.m. and ended just after 2:00 a.m. British Summer Time. Tim Henman, whose best ever result at a Major tournament was reaching the semi-finals on six occasions (once at the French Open, four times at Wimbledon and once at the US Open), declared:

"I definitely see him going on to win more. How many he can win, only time will tell. The Olympics and this will give him so much confidence. I said the first one would be the hardest but I think it will be the first of many, I really do."

Many fellow players current and former, took to Twitter in order to congratulate Murray, including Rafael Nadal, Pat Cash, Laura Robson, Victoria Azarenka, Jo Durie and Colin Fleming, as well as a host of other sportsmen and celebrities such as Gary Lineker, Sir Chris Hoy, Gordon Reid, Stephen Fry and Sir Alex Ferguson. Prime Minister David Cameron and Scottish First Minister Alex Salmond were amongst British politicians who were quick to praise Murray. Dunblane Conservative councillor Callum Campbell stated:

"The word proud just doesn't do it any justice. The people of Dunblane have been supporting Andy and his brother Jamie since they were young boys and Andy has repaid their loyalty 10 times over. A lot of young people who live in Dunblane look up to Andy. He is a local hero."

== See also ==
- Djokovic–Murray rivalry
- 2012 US Open – Men's singles
- 2012 Australian Open – Men's singles final
- Longest tennis match records
