= 2012 US Open – Men's singles =

Men's singles
- 2012 US Open

Final
- Champion: (United Kingdom) Andy Murray
- Runner-up: (Serbia) Novak Djokovic
- Score: 7–6^{(12–10)}, 7–5, 2–6, 3–6, 6–2

Details
- Draw: 128
- Seeds: 32

Events
Singles	men	women		boys	girls
Doubles	men	women	mixed	boys	girls
WC Singles	men	women	quad
WC Doubles	men	women	quad
Legends	men	women	mixed
- US Open

Andy Murray defeated defending champion Novak Djokovic in the final, 7–6^{(12–10)}, 7–5, 2–6, 3–6, 6–2 to win the men's singles tennis title at the 2012 US Open. It was his first major title, following four runner-up finishes. Murray was the first Briton to win a singles major since Virginia Wade in 1977 and the first British man since Fred Perry in 1936. The final lasted 4 hours and 54 minutes, an Open Era record-equaling US Open final duration, tying with the 1988 final between Ivan Lendl and Mats Wilander.

This tournament marked the last professional appearance of 2003 champion and former world No. 1 Andy Roddick; he lost to Juan Martín del Potro in the fourth round.

This tournament marked the first time since the 2004 French Open that neither Roger Federer nor Rafael Nadal (who withdrew from the tournament due to a knee injury) reached the semifinals of a major.

Murray's victory made 2012 the first season since 2003, the year Federer won his first major title, to feature four different champions across the four majors.

== Seeds ==
1. (Switzerland) Roger Federer (quarterfinals)
2. (Serbia) Novak Djokovic (final)
3. (United Kingdom) Andy Murray (champion)
4. (Spain) David Ferrer (semifinals)
5. (France) Jo-Wilfried Tsonga (second round)
6. (Czech Republic) Tomáš Berdych (semifinals)
7. (Argentina) Juan Martín del Potro (quarterfinals)
8. (Serbia) Janko Tipsarević (quarterfinals)
9. (United States) John Isner (third round)
10. (Argentina) Juan Mónaco (first round)
11. (Spain) Nicolás Almagro (fourth round)
12. (Croatia) Marin Čilić (quarterfinals)
13. (France) Richard Gasquet (fourth round)
14. (Ukraine) Alexandr Dolgopolov (third round)
15. (Canada) Milos Raonic (fourth round)
16. (France) Gilles Simon (third round)

17. (Japan) Kei Nishikori (third round)
18. (Switzerland) Stan Wawrinka (fourth round, retired because of illness)
19. (Germany) Philipp Kohlschreiber (fourth round)
20. (United States) Andy Roddick (fourth round)
21. (Germany) Tommy Haas (first round)
22. (Germany) Florian Mayer (first round, retired because of dizziness)
23. (United States) Mardy Fish (fourth round, withdrew for health reasons)
24. (Spain) Marcel Granollers (second round)
25. (Spain) Fernando Verdasco (third round)
26. (Italy) Andreas Seppi (first round)
27. (United States) Sam Querrey (third round)
28. (Russia) Mikhail Youzhny (first round)
29. (Serbia) Viktor Troicki (first round)
30. (Spain) Feliciano López (third round)
31. (France) Julien Benneteau (third round)
32. (France) Jérémy Chardy (third round)

Click on the seed number of a player to go to their draw section.

== Main draw ==
Key

- Q = Qualifier
- WC = Wild card
- LL = Lucky loser
- Alt = Alternate
- ITF = ITF entry
- PR = Protected ranking
- SR = Special ranking
- SE = Special exempt
- JE = Junior exempt
- JR = Junior Accelerator Programme entrant
- CO = College Accelerator Programme entrant
- NG = Next Gen Accelerator Program entrant
- w/o = Walkover
- r = Retired
- d = Defaulted

=== Finals ===
Quarterfinals
1	(Switzerland) Roger Federer	6^{1}	4	6	3
6	(Czech Republic) Tomáš Berdych	7^{7}	6	3	6
3	(United Kingdom) Andy Murray	3	7^{7}	6	6
12	(Croatia) Marin Čilić	6	6^{4}	2	0
8	(Serbia) Janko Tipsarević	3	7^{7}	6	3	6^{4}
4	(Spain) David Ferrer	6	6^{5}	2	6	7^{7}
7	(Argentina) Juan Martín del Potro	2	6^{3}	4
2	(Serbia) Novak Djokovic	6	7^{7}	6

Semifinals
6	(Czech Republic) Tomáš Berdych	7	2	1	6^{7}
3	(United Kingdom) Andy Murray	5	6	6	7^{9}
4	(Spain) David Ferrer	6	1	4	2
2	(Serbia) Novak Djokovic	2	6	6	6

Final
3	(United Kingdom) Andy Murray	7^{12}	7	2	3	6
2	(Serbia) Novak Djokovic	6^{10}	5	6	6	2

=== Top half ===
==== Section 1 ====
First round
1	(Switzerland) R Federer	6	6	6
(United States) D Young	3	2	4
Q	(Belgium) M Authom	2	6	4	6^{5}
(Germany) B Phau	6	4	6	7^{7}
(Spain) A Ramos	6^{3}	7	6	6
WC	(United States) R Ginepri	7^{7}	5	4	0
(Portugal) R Machado	1	2	4
25	(Spain) F Verdasco	6	6	6
23	(United States) M Fish	7^{7}	7^{7}	6
(Japan) G Soeda	6^{3}	6^{2}	3
(Russia) N Davydenko	7	3	6	6
Q	(Argentina) G Pella	5	6	4	2
(Croatia) I Karlović	6^{4}	7^{10}	1	4
Q	(Chinese Taipei) J Wang	7^{7}	6^{8}	6	6
(United States) M Russell	6^{4}	6	7	4	1
16	(France) G Simon	7^{7}	3	5	6	6

Second round
1	(Switzerland) R Federer	6	6	6
(Germany) B Phau	2	3	2
(Spain) A Ramos	6^{4}	7	6^{5}	4
25	(Spain) F Verdasco	7^{7}	5	7^{7}	6
23	(United States) M Fish	4	6^{4}	6	6	6
(Russia) N Davydenko	6	7^{7}	2	1	2
Q	(Chinese Taipei) J Wang	4	6	4	4
16	(France) G Simon	6	4	6	6

Third round
1	(Switzerland) R Federer	6	6	6
25	(Spain) F Verdasco	3	4	4
23	(United States) M Fish	6	5	7^{7}	6
16	(France) G Simon	1	7	6^{5}	3

Fourth round
1	(Switzerland) R Federer	w/o
23	(United States) M Fish

==== Section 2 ====
First round
11	(Spain) N Almagro	6	6^{5}	6	6
(Czech Republic) R Štěpánek	4	7^{7}	3	4
(France) N Mahut	6	6	4	5	6^{3}
(Germany) P Petzschner	1	4	6	7	7^{7}
(Slovenia) B Kavčič	4	6^{5}	6	3
(Italy) F Cipolla	6	7^{7}	3	6
WC	(United States) J Sock	6	6	3
22	(Germany) F Mayer	3	2	2^{r}
27	(United States) S Querrey	6^{4}	6	6	7
(Chinese Taipei) Y-h Lu	7^{7}	4	4	5
(Spain) R Ramírez Hidalgo	6	6	3	6
PR	(India) S Devvarman	3	2	6	4
(Uzbekistan) D Istomin	6	3	3	5
(Estonia) J Zopp	3	6	6	7
(Belgium) D Goffin	5	3	3
6	(Czech Republic) T Berdych	7	6	6

Second round
11	(Spain) N Almagro	6	5	5	6	6
(Germany) P Petzschner	3	7	7	4	4
(Italy) F Cipolla	2	2	4
WC	(United States) J Sock	6	6	6
27	(United States) S Querrey	6	6	6
(Spain) R Ramírez Hidalgo	3	4	3
(Estonia) J Zopp	1	4	2
6	(Czech Republic) T Berdych	6	6	6

Third round
11	(Spain) N Almagro	7^{7}	6^{4}	7^{7}	6
WC	(United States) J Sock	6^{3}	7^{7}	6^{2}	1
27	(United States) S Querrey	7^{8}	4	3	2
6	(Czech Republic) T Berdych	6^{6}	6	6	6

Fourth round
11	(Spain) N Almagro	6^{4}	4	1
6	(Czech Republic) T Berdych	7^{7}	6	6

==== Section 3 ====
First round
3	(United Kingdom) A Murray	6	6	6
(Russia) A Bogomolov Jr.	2	4	1
Q	(Japan) H Moriya	0	1	2
(Croatia) I Dodig	6	6	6
(Brazil) T Bellucci	6^{5}	6	6^{1}	5
(Spain) P Andújar	7^{7}	3	7^{7}	7
(Netherlands) R Haase	3	5	2
30	(Spain) F López	6	7	6
24	(Spain) M Granollers	6	4	6	7^{7}
WC	(United States) D Kudla	3	6	3	6^{2}
(Slovakia) L Lacko	5	2	6	3
WC	(United States) J Blake	7	6	3	6
PR	(France) P-H Mathieu	2	4	7^{7}	7^{7}	6
(Russia) I Andreev	6	6	6^{1}	6^{4}	1
(Colombia) S Giraldo	3	6	6	4	4
15	(Canada) M Raonic	6	4	3	6	6

Second round
3	(United Kingdom) A Murray	6	6	6
(Croatia) I Dodig	2	1	3
(Spain) P Andújar	4	1	7^{7}	6	5
30	(Spain) F López	6	6	6^{5}	3	7
24	(Spain) M Granollers	1	4	2
WC	(United States) J Blake	6	6	6
PR	(France) P-H Mathieu	5	4	6^{4}
15	(Canada) M Raonic	7	6	7^{7}

Third round
3	(United Kingdom) A Murray	7^{7}	7^{7}	4	7^{7}
30	(Spain) F López	6^{5}	6^{5}	6	6^{4}
WC	(United States) J Blake	3	0	6^{3}
15	(Canada) M Raonic	6	6	7^{7}

Fourth round
3	(United Kingdom) A Murray	6	6	6
15	(Canada) M Raonic	4	4	2

==== Section 4 ====
First round
12	(Croatia) M Čilić	5	2	6	6	6
(Australia) M Matosevic	7	6	4	2	4
Q	(Germany) D Brands	7^{7}	6	7^{7}
(Romania) A Ungur	6^{4}	4	6^{5}
Q	(United States) T Smyczek	1	6	6	4	6
Q	(United States) B Reynolds	6	4	2	6	4
Q	(Argentina) G Andreozzi	1	2	4
17	(Japan) K Nishikori	6	6	6
32	(France) J Chardy	6	6	6
(Italy) F Volandri	3	4	3
(Japan) T Ito	6^{9}	3	2
(Australia) M Ebden	7^{11}	6	6
(Slovakia) M Kližan	6	6	6
(Colombia) A Falla	4	1	2
Q	(Slovakia) K Beck	3	1	6^{2}
5	(France) J-W Tsonga	6	6	7^{7}

Second round
12	(Croatia) M Čilić	6	6	5	4	7
Q	(Germany) D Brands	3	2	7	6	5
Q	(United States) T Smyczek	2	2	4
17	(Japan) K Nishikori	6	6	6
32	(France) J Chardy	6	6	6
(Australia) M Ebden	4	2	2
(Slovakia) M Kližan	6	1	6	6
5	(France) J-W Tsonga	4	6	1	3

Third round
12	(Croatia) M Čilić	6	6	6^{3}	6
17	(Japan) K Nishikori	3	4	7^{7}	3
32	(France) J Chardy	4	4	4
(Slovakia) M Kližan	6	6	6

Fourth round
12	(Croatia) M Čilić	7	6	6
(Slovakia) M Kližan	5	4	0

=== Bottom half ===
==== Section 5 ====
First round
8	(Serbia) J Tipsarević	4	3	6	6	6
WC	(France) G Rufin	6	6	2	3	2
(United States) B Baker	6	6	6
(Czech Republic) J Hájek	3	4	2
Q	(Slovenia) G Žemlja	7	7^{7}	7
Q	(Brazil) R Mello	5	6^{3}	5
(Germany) C-M Stebe	6	6	3	6
29	(Serbia) V Troicki	4	4	6	2
19	(Germany) P Kohlschreiber	7^{7}	4	7^{7}	6
(France) M Llodra	6^{2}	6	6^{4}	1
(Bulgaria) G Dimitrov	7	3	6^{4}	2
(France) B Paire	5	6	7^{7}	6
(Kazakhstan) M Kukushkin	0	2^{r}
(Finland) J Nieminen	6	6
(Belgium) X Malisse	3	6^{5}	7	6^{9}
9	(United States) J Isner	6	7^{7}	5	7^{11}

Second round
8	(Serbia) J Tipsarević	6	6	6
(United States) B Baker	4	3	4
Q	(Slovenia) G Žemlja	6	2	6	6
(Germany) C-M Stebe	4	6	4	4
19	(Germany) P Kohlschreiber	6^{4}	6	3	6	7^{7}
(France) B Paire	7^{7}	3	6	2	6^{4}
(Finland) J Nieminen	3	7^{7}	4	3
9	(United States) J Isner	6	6^{5}	6	6

Third round
8	(Serbia) J Tipsarević	6	6	7
Q	(Slovenia) G Žemlja	4	3	5
19	(Germany) P Kohlschreiber	6	3	4	6	6
9	(United States) J Isner	4	6	6	3	4

Fourth round
8	(Serbia) J Tipsarević	6	7^{7}	6
19	(Germany) P Kohlschreiber	3	6^{5}	2

==== Section 6 ====
First round
13	(France) R Gasquet	4	6	6	6
(Spain) A Montañés	6	2	3	3
(Austria) J Melzer	6	3	5	7	4
Q	(United States) B Klahn	4	6	7	5	6
WC	(United States) S Johnson	6	7^{7}	6
(United States) R Ram	3	6^{5}	3
(Latvia) E Gulbis	3	4	6	7	6
21	(Germany) T Haas	6	6	4	5	3
28	(Russia) M Youzhny	6	6	5	6^{6}	6^{6}
(Luxembourg) G Müller	2	3	7	7^{8}	7^{8}
(Germany) T Kamke	6	2	1	4
WC	(Australia) L Hewitt	4	6	6	6
Q	(Netherlands) I Sijsling	7	6	6
(Spain) D Gimeno Traver	5	3	4
(South Africa) K Anderson	4	2	6^{3}
4	(Spain) D Ferrer	6	6	7^{7}

Second round
13	(France) R Gasquet	6	6	6
Q	(United States) B Klahn	3	3	1
WC	(United States) S Johnson	6^{3}	7^{7}	6	6
(Latvia) E Gulbis	7^{7}	6^{5}	3	4
(Luxembourg) G Müller	6	6^{5}	7^{7}	5	4
WC	(Australia) L Hewitt	3	7^{7}	6^{5}	7	6
Q	(Netherlands) I Sijsling	2	3	6^{12}
4	(Spain) D Ferrer	6	6	7^{14}

Third round
13	(France) R Gasquet	7^{7}	6	6
WC	(United States) S Johnson	6^{4}	2	3
WC	(Australia) L Hewitt	6^{9}	6	3	0
4	(Spain) D Ferrer	7^{11}	4	6	6

Fourth round
13	(France) R Gasquet	5	6^{2}	4
4	(Spain) D Ferrer	7	7^{7}	6

==== Section 7 ====
First round
7	(Argentina) JM del Potro	6	7^{7}	6
LL	(France) F Serra	4	6^{4}	4
(Germany) B Becker	5	4	2
(United States) R Harrison	7	6	6
(Poland) Ł Kubot	4	4	5
(Argentina) L Mayer	6	6	7
PR	(Spain) T Robredo	6	7	6
26	(Italy) A Seppi	1	5	3
20	(United States) A Roddick	6	6	6
Q	(United States) R Williams	3	4	4
(Argentina) C Berlocq	6	5	3	4
(Australia) B Tomic	4	7	6	6
(France) É Roger-Vasselin	6	7	4	4	5
(Italy) F Fognini	3	5	6	6	7
(Spain) G García López	3	1	6	7^{8}	7^{7}
10	(Argentina) J Mónaco	6	6	4	6^{6}	6^{3}

Second round
7	(Argentina) JM del Potro	6	6	2	6
(United States) R Harrison	2	3	6	2
(Argentina) L Mayer	6	6	4	7
PR	(Spain) T Robredo	1	4	6	5
20	(United States) A Roddick	6	6	6
(Australia) B Tomic	3	4	0
(Italy) F Fognini	6	6	6
(Spain) G García López	4	4	2

Third round
7	(Argentina) JM del Potro	6	7	7^{11}
(Argentina) L Mayer	3	5	6^{9}
20	(United States) A Roddick	7	7^{7}	4	6
(Italy) F Fognini	5	6^{1}	6	4

Fourth round
7	(Argentina) JM del Potro	6^{1}	7^{7}	6	6
20	(United States) A Roddick	7^{7}	6^{4}	2	4

==== Section 8 ====
First round
14	(Ukraine) A Dolgopolov	3	4	6	6	6
(United States) J Levine	6	6	4	1	2
(Cyprus) M Baghdatis	6	4	6	6^{8}	7^{7}
Q	(Germany) M Bachinger	2	6	4	7^{10}	6^{5}
(Belgium) S Darcis	3	6	6	6
(Tunisia) M Jaziri	6	1	1	1
(Ukraine) S Stakhovsky	7^{8}	6^{2}	4	2
18	(Switzerland) S Wawrinka	6^{6}	7^{7}	6	6
31	(France) J Benneteau	7^{7}	6	6
(Belgium) O Rochus	6^{1}	2	3
WC	(United States) D Novikov	6	7^{8}	3	6
(Poland) J Janowicz	2	6^{6}	6	3
(Brazil) R Dutra da Silva	4	6	6^{5}	6	7
Q	(Russia) T Gabashvili	6	4	7^{7}	3	5
(Italy) P Lorenzi	1	0	1
2	(Serbia) N Djokovic	6	6	6

Second round
14	(Ukraine) A Dolgopolov	6	3	6	7^{7}
(Cyprus) M Baghdatis	4	6	0	6^{5}
(Belgium) S Darcis	7^{8}	3	6	1	5
18	(Switzerland) S Wawrinka	6^{6}	6	4	6	7
31	(France) J Benneteau	3	6	7^{7}	7
WC	(United States) D Novikov	6	3	6^{1}	5
(Brazil) R Dutra da Silva	2	1	2
2	(Serbia) N Djokovic	6	6	6

Third round
14	(Ukraine) A Dolgopolov	4	4	2
18	(Switzerland) S Wawrinka	6	6	6
31	(France) J Benneteau	3	2	2
2	(Serbia) N Djokovic	6	6	6

Fourth round
18	(Switzerland) S Wawrinka	4	1	1^{r}
2	(Serbia) N Djokovic	6	6	3

Preceded by 2012 Wimbledon Championships – Men's singles	Grand Slam men's singles	Succeeded by 2013 Australian Open – Men's singles
