= Bojan Božović (tennis) =

Serbian tennis player (born 1987)

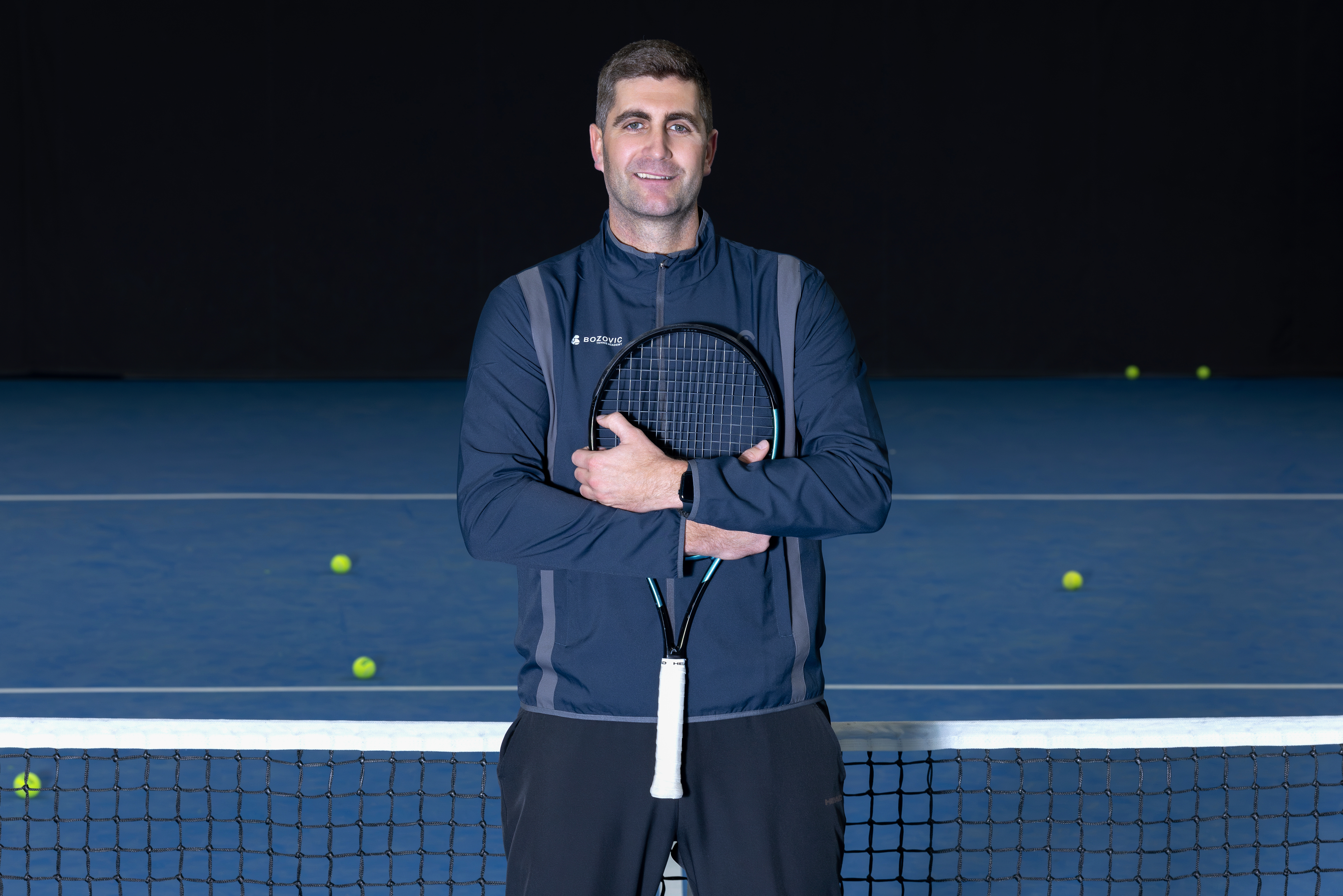
- Country (sports): Yugoslavia (2001–2002)
- Born: 23 February 1987 (age 39)
- Height: 2.00 m (6 ft 7 in)
- Plays: Left-handed
- Prize money: 680

Singles
- Career record: 0–1

Doubles
- Highest ranking: No. 1697 (7 June 2004)

Bojan Božović (born 23 February 1987) is a Serbian former professional tennis player and tennis coach. In his career, Božović defeated several world-renowned players, such as Ernests Gulbis, Robin Haase, Marin Čilić, Sergei Bubka, and Fabio Fognini, but he is now better known for his role in Novak Djokovic's junior career.

== Early life ==
Božović was born on 23 February 1987 in Belgrade, Serbia. He showed an interest in sports from an early age. He started training in tennis at the age of six. When he was 14, he was already two meters tall, and his height helped him develop a very powerful serve. He started competing in 1998 and immediately achieved outstanding results. Some of his mentors were Božidar Matić and Goran Zindović.

== Career ==
In 2000, Božović became a member of the newly opened Gemax club, where he had his own private coach, Goran Grbović. One of the players he trained with at the Gemax club academy was Novak Djokovic, who was just three months younger and who began working with Grbović informally. In 2001, he was a U14 State tennis champion. In April 2001, in Italy, Božović participated in three ETA tournaments in the U14 circuit of the Tennis Europe Junior Tour, with his best performance coming in Messina, in the second category, where he was beaten in the final by Djokovic, while in the doubles he won alongside him.

He became a member of the national team at the age of 14 and played for the Yugoslavia national team in the age categories of U14, U16 and U18. In June 2001, Božović was part of the Yugoslavian team; which also included Djokovic, Branko Kuzmanovic, and Denis Bejtulahi, and coached by Janko Vucetic; that won the European Summer Cup. In the tournament itself, held in Tarragona, Božović lost his singles matches with Italy in the quarters and Russia in the semis, but then redeemed himself by winning the decisive match of the final against Slovenia. In July, Božović played in the U14 European Junior championship, held in Sanremo, and won the doubles event alongside Djokovic, beating Russia’s Mikhail Bekker and Alexandre Krasnoroutskiy in the final, 7-6 7-5. They thus joined the likes of Mats Wilander and Thomas Enqvist, who had also won a gold medal in this tournament. This was Djokovic’s first international individual title. In August, Božović was part of the Yugoslavian team that finished as runner-ups of the ITF World Junior Championship in Prostějov.

In 2001, the then Prime Minister of Serbia, Zoran Djindjic, awarded him a letter of thanks from the Ministry of Youth and Sports for his development and contribution to sports and raising the reputation of his country. He finished the 2001 season in 16th place in the ETA ranking for under 14 years.

After Gemax, he then joined TK Partizan, and trained there until the end of his career in 2007. In 2003, he was a U16 State team champion with Partizan, a U16 State champion, and a Senior National Champion. In that same year, he was part of the Serbian team that won the U16 European championship.

In 2004, he was a U18 State Champion, and both a U18 and a Senior State team champion with Partizan. In total, Božović won the National Championship in individual and team categories a total of 10 times.

After he stopped playing tennis professionally due to injuries, he started working as a coach and in five years managed to build a strong reputation as a professional coach.

== Coaching ==
Božović came to Switzerland in 2012 as a hardworking and ambitious man with a vision. He immediately began working with great effort, building a path towards the realization of his goal, which was the formation of a tennis academy. He finally founded his Academy in 2014, where he is working as a tennis coach, president, and Chief Executive Officer (CEO). His duties include the oversight of day-to-day operations and management decisions, as well as developing, implementing, and executing the Academy’s long and short-term plans.

Before the 2014 Paris Masters final against Milos Raonic, a player with a powerful serve, Djokovic decided to train his returns, and although he enjoyed the assistance from his two coaches, Boris Becker and Marian Vajda, he expressly wanted to practice his return with Božović, who was very tall.

Božović has developed his players and has been focused on making coaches and players in his Academy better. Most notably, he sponsored the 2021 European tennis champion in the under-14 competition, Nikola Djosic. The Božović Academy was Djosic's tennis home for three years, but he is now in the program of Swiss Tennis Association and is regarded as a great hope for Swiss tennis.

Božović has worked with many Serbian best juniors: Natasa Zoric (former No. 388 WTA in Singles), Kristina Ostojic (No.2 in Serbia U18), Predrag Marjanovic (No.1 in Serbia U16), Ivana Draskovic (No.2 in Serbia U16), Stefan Dinic (No.10 in Serbia U14), Anastasija Cobanovic (No.2 in Serbia U14).

Božović was also a sports director of Novak Tennis Center in Belgrade in 2021, where he was one of the main figures in setting up the system, organization, and founding Novak Tennis Academy.
