= ITF World Junior Tennis Finals =

Recurring tennis competition

- Sport: Tennis
- Founded: 1991
- Continent: Worldwide
- Most recent champions: France (Boys, 4th title); United States (Girls, 8th title)
- Most titles: United States (Boys, 7 titles); United States (Girls, 8 titles)

ITF World Junior Tennis Finals are the international team events for the 14-and-under age category. The senior equivalents of the Junior Davis Cup and Junior Billie Jean King Cup are the Davis Cup and Billie Jean King Cup, respectively.

The event has seen a number of its champions go on to become slam winners, including Amelie Mauresmo (1993 France), Lleyton Hewitt (1994–95 Australia), Kim Clijsters (1995–97 Belgium), Andy Roddick (1996 USA), Justine Henin (1995–96 Belgium), Agnieszka Radwanska (2005 Poland), Rafael Nadal (2000 Spain), and Novak Djokovic (2001 Yugoslavia).

== History ==
The ITF World Junior Tennis Competition was launched in 1991 as an International Team Competition for players aged 14 and under. Teams from across the world compete in this event with over 100 countries represented in the opening stages of the competition for a place in the Final where the top 16 boys' and girls' teams from regional qualifying compete for the title.

The Finals were held in Japan from 1991 until 1998 and for the first six years, it was sponsored by the Nippon Telegraph and Telephone Corporation (NTT). The event moved to Prostějov, Czech Republic in 1999.

== Format ==
Each year nations enter regional qualifying events with the winners progressing to the Finals, where they compete to be crowned champion.

== Results ==
=== Boys ===
Year	Host	Champion	Score	Runner-up
1991	Japan	Spain	2–1	Italy
1992	Japan	Austria	2–1	United States
1993	Japan	France	2–1	Slovenia
1994	Japan	Italy	2–1	Belgium
1995	Japan	United Kingdom	3–0	Germany
1996	Japan, Nagoya	Argentina	3–0	Sweden
1997	Japan, Nagoya	South Africa	2–1	Czech Republic
1998	Japan, Nagoya	Austria	3–0	Argentina
1999	Czech Republic, Prostejov	France	2–1	Chile
2000	Czech Republic, Prostejov	Spain	3–0	Russia
2001	Czech Republic, Prostejov	Germany	2–0	Yugoslavia
2002	Czech Republic, Prostejov	United States	2–1	Spain
2003	Czech Republic, Prostejov	United States	2–1	Japan
2004	Czech Republic, Prostejov	United Kingdom	2–0	Czech Republic
2005	Czech Republic, Prostejov	France	2–1	Argentina
2006	Czech Republic, Prostejov	Italy	2–1	Japan
2007	Czech Republic, Prostejov	Australia	2–0	Czech Republic
2008	Czech Republic, Prostejov	United States	3–0	France
2009	Czech Republic, Prostejov	Spain	2–0	Portugal
2010	Czech Republic, Prostejov	Chile	2–1	Italy
2011	Czech Republic, Prostejov	South Korea	2–1	Japan
2012	Czech Republic, Prostejov	United States	2–0	South Korea
2013	Czech Republic, Prostejov	Russia	2–1	United States
2014	Czech Republic, Prostejov	Germany	2–1	Canada
2015	Czech Republic, Prostejov	South Korea	2–1	Spain
2016	Czech Republic, Prostejov	Argentina	2–0	China
2017	Czech Republic, Prostejov	Switzerland	2–1	Spain
2018	Czech Republic, Prostejov	United States	3–0	Czech Republic
2019	Czech Republic, Prostejov	United States	2–1	France
2020	Did not played			
2021	Czech Republic, Prostejov	Italy	2–0	Russia
2022	Czech Republic, Prostejov	Switzerland	2–1	Germany
2023	Czech Republic, Prostejov	Czech Republic	2–0	Canada
2024	Czech Republic, Prostejov	United States	2–0	Brazil
2025	Czech Republic, Prostejov	France	2–0	United States

=== Girls ===
Year	Host	Champion	Score	Runner-up
1991	Japan	Czechoslovakia	3–0	Australia
1992	Japan	United States	3–0	Australia
1993	Japan	Germany	2–1	United States
1994	Japan	Germany	2–1	Czech Republic
1995	Japan	Slovenia	2–1	Hungary
1996	Japan, Nagoya	Slovakia	3–0	United Kingdom
1997	Japan, Nagoya	Russia	2–1	Slovakia
1998	Japan, Nagoya	Czech Republic	2–1	Russia
1999	Czech Republic, Prostejov	Russia	2–1	Slovakia
2000	Czech Republic, Prostejov	Russia	3–0	Czech Republic
2001	Czech Republic, Prostejov	Czech Republic	2–1	Russia
2002	Czech Republic, Prostejov	Netherlands	3–0	Poland
2003	Czech Republic, Prostejov	Czech Republic	2–1	Russia
2004	Czech Republic, Prostejov	Belarus	2–1	Austria
2005	Czech Republic, Prostejov	Russia	3–0	Japan
2006	Czech Republic, Prostejov	Ukraine	2–1	Russia
2007	Czech Republic, Prostejov	United States	2–1	France
2008	Czech Republic, Prostejov	United States	2–1	United Kingdom
2009	Czech Republic, Prostejov	United States	2–1	Czech Republic
2010	Czech Republic, Prostejov	United States	2–1	Ukraine
2011	Czech Republic, Prostejov	Serbia	2–1	United States
2012	Czech Republic, Prostejov	Slovakia	2–1	United Kingdom
2013	Czech Republic, Prostejov	United States	2–0	Russia
2014	Czech Republic, Prostejov	Russia	2–0	Ukraine
2015	Czech Republic, Prostejov	Russia	2–1	United States
2016	Czech Republic, Prostejov	Ukraine	2–1	United States
2017	Czech Republic, Prostejov	United States	2–1	Ukraine
2018	Czech Republic, Prostejov	Russia	2–1	Czech Republic
2019	Czech Republic, Prostejov	Czech Republic	2–0	United States
2020	Did not played			
2021	Czech Republic, Prostejov	Authorised Neutral Athletes	2–0	Bulgaria
2022	Czech Republic, Prostejov	Czech Republic	3–0	Germany
2023	Czech Republic, Prostejov	Czech Republic	2–0	Germany
2024	Czech Republic, Prostejov	Czech Republic	2–1	United States
2025	Czech Republic, Prostejov	United States	2–1	Canada

== Titles by country ==
=== Boys ===
Rank	Nation	Titles
1	United States	7
2	France	4
3	Italy	3
3	Spain	3
5	Argentina	2
5	Austria	2
5	Germany	2
5	South Korea	2
5	Switzerland	2
5	United Kingdom	2
11	Australia	1
11	Chile	1
11	Czech Republic	1
11	Russia	1
11	South Africa	1

=== Girls ===
Rank	Nation	Titles
1	United States	8
2	Czech Republic	7
2	Russia	7
4	Germany	2
4	Slovakia	2
4	Ukraine	2
6	Authorised Neutral Athletes	1
6	Belarus	1
6	Czechoslovakia	1
6	Netherlands	1
6	Serbia	1
6	Slovenia	1

== See also ==
- Junior tennis
- ITF Junior Circuit
- Junior Davis Cup and Junior Billie Jean King Cup
