= 2019 Wimbledon Championships – Women's singles qualifying =

Women's singles qualifying
- 2019 Wimbledon Championships

Events
Singles	men	women		boys	girls
Doubles	men	women	mixed	boys	girls
WC Singles	men	women	quad
WC Doubles	men	women	quad
Legends	men	women	seniors

Qualification
Singles	men	women
- Wimbledon Championships

Players who neither have high enough rankings nor receive wild cards may participate in a qualifying tournament held one week before the annual Wimbledon Tennis Championships.

This was the first time the Wimbledon women's singles event had 16 qualifiers, following the example set by the US Open. Wimbledon previously had 12 qualifiers in the women's draw.

Cori "Coco" Gauff, the 2023 US Open women's singles champion, became the youngest qualifier to reach the main draw at Wimbledon in the Open Era at 15 years and 122 days old.

== Seeds ==
1. (Spain) Aliona Bolsova (first round)
2. (Russia) Anna Blinkova (qualifying competition)
3. (United States) Lauren Davis (qualifying competition, lucky loser)
4. (Japan) Misaki Doi (second round)
5. (Russia) Natalia Vikhlyantseva (second round)
6. (United States) Christina McHale (qualifying competition, lucky loser)
7. (Czech Republic) Kristýna Plíšková (moved to main draw)
8. (Kazakhstan) Elena Rybakina (qualifying competition)
9. (United States) Whitney Osuigwe (first round)
10. (Romania) Irina-Camelia Begu (second round)
11. (Japan) Nao Hibino (first round)
12. (Belgium) Ysaline Bonaventure (qualified)
13. (Czech Republic) Marie Bouzková (qualifying competition, lucky loser)
14. (Serbia) Olga Danilović (qualifying competition)
15. (United States) Varvara Lepchenko (second round)
16. (Czech Republic) Tereza Smitková (second round)
17. (Brazil) Beatriz Haddad Maia (qualified)
18. (United States) Allie Kiick (first round)
19. (Belgium) Greet Minnen (qualifying competition)
20. (Slovenia) Kaja Juvan (qualified)
21. (China) Wang Xiyu (second round)
22. (Spain) Paula Badosa (qualified)
23. (Australia) Priscilla Hon (second round)
24. (Romania) Ana Bogdan (qualified)
25. (United States) Sachia Vickery (first round)
26. (Netherlands) Arantxa Rus (qualifying competition)
27. (Hungary) Tímea Babos (first round)
28. (Russia) Varvara Flink (qualified)
29. (Czech Republic) Tereza Martincová (qualified)
30. (Russia) Anna Kalinskaya (qualified)
31. (Russia) Liudmila Samsonova (qualifying competition)
32. (Germany) Tamara Korpatsch (second round)
33. (Sweden) Johanna Larsson (first round)

== Qualifiers ==
1. (United States) Cori Gauff
2. (Czech Republic) Tereza Martincová
3. (United States) Kristie Ahn
4. (Australia) Arina Rodionova
5. (Russia) Anna Kalinskaya
6. (Slovenia) Kaja Juvan
7. (United States) Caty McNally
8. (Russia) Varvara Flink
9. (Spain) Paula Badosa
10. (Italy) Giulia Gatto-Monticone
11. (Romania) Elena-Gabriela Ruse
12. (Belgium) Ysaline Bonaventure
13. (Romania) Ana Bogdan
14. (Brazil) Beatriz Haddad Maia
15. (Netherlands) Lesley Kerkhove
16. (Belgium) Yanina Wickmayer

== Lucky losers ==
1. (Czech Republic) Marie Bouzková
2. (United States) Lauren Davis
3. (United States) Christina McHale

== Qualifying draw ==
=== First qualifier ===
First round
1	(Spain) Aliona Bolsova	3	4
WC	(United States) Cori Gauff	6	6
(China) Ma Shuyue	3	1
Alt	(Russia) Valentina Ivakhnenko	6	6
WC	(United Kingdom) Emma Raducanu	6^{4}	2
(Chinese Taipei) Liang En-shuo	7^{7}	6
(Israel) Julia Glushko	2	1
19	(Belgium) Greet Minnen	6	6

Second round
WC	(United States) Cori Gauff	6	6
Alt	(Russia) Valentina Ivakhnenko	2	3
(Chinese Taipei) Liang En-shuo	3	6	1
19	(Belgium) Greet Minnen	6	2	6

Qualifying competition
WC	(United States) Cori Gauff	6	6
19	(Belgium) Greet Minnen	1	1

=== Second qualifier ===
First round
2	(Russia) Anna Blinkova	6	7
(Australia) Zoe Hives	1	5
(Italy) Martina Di Giuseppe	7^{7}	6
(Australia) Destanee Aiava	6^{3}	4
(Romania) Alexandra Cadanțu	1	6	3
(United States) Caroline Dolehide	6	3	6
(China) Xu Shilin	6	5	4
29	(Czech Republic) Tereza Martincová	1	7	6

Second round
2	(Russia) Anna Blinkova	6	6
(Italy) Martina Di Giuseppe	3	4
(United States) Caroline Dolehide	1	6^{5}
29	(Czech Republic) Tereza Martincová	6	7^{7}

Qualifying competition
2	(Russia) Anna Blinkova	6	3	5
29	(Czech Republic) Tereza Martincová	4	6	7

=== Third qualifier ===
First round
3	(United States) Lauren Davis	1	7^{7}	6
(Netherlands) Bibiane Schoofs	6	6^{3}	4
(Belgium) Maryna Zanevska	6^{4}	6^{3}
(United States) Francesca Di Lorenzo	7^{7}	7^{7}
WC	(United Kingdom) Naomi Broady	6^{3}	6^{4}
(United States) Kristie Ahn	7^{7}	7^{7}
(United States) Robin Anderson	3	7^{7}	4
32	(Germany) Tamara Korpatsch	6	6^{0}	6

Second round
3	(United States) Lauren Davis	6	7
(United States) Francesca Di Lorenzo	4	5
(United States) Kristie Ahn	6	6
32	(Germany) Tamara Korpatsch	2	0

Qualifying competition
3	(United States) Lauren Davis	4	5
(United States) Kristie Ahn	6	7

=== Fourth qualifier ===
First round
4	(Japan) Misaki Doi	6	4	7
(Australia) Kimberly Birrell	1	6	5
(Australia) Arina Rodionova	7^{8}	6^{2}	8
(United States) Asia Muhammad	6^{6}	7^{7}	6
(United Kingdom) Naiktha Bains	4	2
(United States) Danielle Lao	6	6
(Montenegro) Danka Kovinić	6	6
25	(United States) Sachia Vickery	4	4

Second round
4	(Japan) Misaki Doi	4	2
(Australia) Arina Rodionova	6	6
(United States) Danielle Lao	6	7^{7}
(Montenegro) Danka Kovinić	2	6^{5}

Qualifying competition
(Australia) Arina Rodionova	0	6	6
(United States) Danielle Lao	6	1	1

=== Fifth qualifier ===
First round
5	(Russia) Natalia Vikhlyantseva	4	6	6
(Czech Republic) Anastasia Zarycká	6	3	1
(Germany) Antonia Lottner	6	6
(Switzerland) Conny Perrin	3	2
(United States) Claire Liu	5	1
(Croatia) Tereza Mrdeža	7	6
(Ukraine) Marta Kostyuk	1	5
30	(Russia) Anna Kalinskaya	6	7

Second round
5	(Russia) Natalia Vikhlyantseva	4	1
(Germany) Antonia Lottner	6	6
(Croatia) Tereza Mrdeža	2	2
30	(Russia) Anna Kalinskaya	6	6

Qualifying competition
(Germany) Antonia Lottner	3	3
30	(Russia) Anna Kalinskaya	6	6

=== Sixth qualifier ===
First round
6	(United States) Christina McHale	6	6
(Japan) Ayano Shimizu	4	4
(Uzbekistan) Sabina Sharipova	6	3	7
(Slovakia) Kristína Kučová	1	6	5
(Belgium) Kimberley Zimmermann	6	4	5
(Turkey) Başak Eraydın	4	6	7
(Greece) Valentini Grammatikopoulou	4	6	8
20	(Slovenia) Kaja Juvan	6	3	10

Second round
6	(United States) Christina McHale	3	7	6
(Uzbekistan) Sabina Sharipova	6	5	2
(Turkey) Başak Eraydın	6	6^{3}	3
20	(Slovenia) Kaja Juvan	4	7^{7}	6

Qualifying competition
6	(United States) Christina McHale	2	1
20	(Slovenia) Kaja Juvan	6	6

=== Seventh qualifier ===
First round
33	(Sweden) Johanna Larsson	3	4
(Bulgaria) Isabella Shinikova	6	6
(United States) Ann Li	5	2
(Slovakia) Jana Čepelová	7	6
(United States) Caty McNally	7^{7}	7^{7}
(Japan) Kurumi Nara	6^{4}	6^{2}
(Ukraine) Katarina Zavatska	5	3
23	(Australia) Priscilla Hon	7	6

Second round
(Bulgaria) Isabella Shinikova	3	5
(Slovakia) Jana Čepelová	6	7
(United States) Caty McNally	6	6
23	(Australia) Priscilla Hon	4	4

Qualifying competition
(Slovakia) Jana Čepelová	4	3
(United States) Caty McNally	6	6

=== Eighth qualifier ===
First round
8	(Kazakhstan) Elena Rybakina	6	6
(Australia) Ellen Perez	1	4
(Netherlands) Richèl Hogenkamp	6	6
(Bulgaria) Viktoriya Tomova	4	2
(Italy) Martina Trevisan	3	4
(France) Jessika Ponchet	6	6
(Italy) Jasmine Paolini	6^{1}	3
28	(Russia) Varvara Flink	7^{7}	6

Second round
8	(Kazakhstan) Elena Rybakina	6	6
(Netherlands) Richèl Hogenkamp	3	0
(France) Jessika Ponchet	4	2
28	(Russia) Varvara Flink	6	6

Qualifying competition
8	(Kazakhstan) Elena Rybakina	3	6	6
28	(Russia) Varvara Flink	6	4	8

=== Ninth qualifier ===
First round
9	(United States) Whitney Osuigwe	6	5	3
(Spain) Cristina Bucșa	4	7	6
(China) Peng Shuai	4	7^{7}	4
WC	(United Kingdom) Samantha Murray	6	6^{5}	6
(China) Liu Fangzhou	6	7^{7}
(Israel) Deniz Khazaniuk	3	6^{5}
PR	(Romania) Patricia Maria Țig	6	1	4
22	(Spain) Paula Badosa	3	6	6

Second round
(Spain) Cristina Bucșa	6^{4}	4
WC	(United Kingdom) Samantha Murray	7^{7}	6
(China) Liu Fangzhou	5	2
22	(Spain) Paula Badosa	7	6

Qualifying competition
WC	(United Kingdom) Samantha Murray	4	6	3
22	(Spain) Paula Badosa	6	2	6

=== Tenth qualifier ===
First round
10	(Romania) Irina-Camelia Begu	7^{7}	6
(China) Lu Jiajing	6^{2}	4
(Serbia) Dejana Radanović	6^{5}	5
PR	(France) Océane Dodin	7^{7}	7
(Italy) Giulia Gatto-Monticone	4	6	6
(Cyprus) Raluca Șerban	6	3	3
(Spain) Georgina García Pérez	5	3
21	(China) Wang Xiyu	7	6

Second round
10	(Romania) Irina-Camelia Begu	3	6	6
PR	(France) Océane Dodin	6	1	8
(Italy) Giulia Gatto-Monticone	6	6
21	(China) Wang Xiyu	3	1

Qualifying competition
PR	(France) Océane Dodin	6	5	1
(Italy) Giulia Gatto-Monticone	3	7	6

=== Eleventh qualifier ===
First round
11	(Japan) Nao Hibino	6^{2}	6	8
(Hungary) Fanny Stollár	7^{7}	2	10
(Poland) Katarzyna Kawa	6	6^{1}	6
WC	(United Kingdom) Francesca Jones	3	7^{7}	3
(Romania) Elena-Gabriela Ruse	6	6
(Bulgaria) Sesil Karatantcheva	2	2
(Romania) Irina Bara	6^{4}	6	6
18	(United States) Allie Kiick	7^{7}	1	4

Second round
(Hungary) Fanny Stollár	5	3
(Poland) Katarzyna Kawa	7	6
(Romania) Elena-Gabriela Ruse	6	5	6
(Romania) Irina Bara	2	7	4

Qualifying competition
(Poland) Katarzyna Kawa	5	1
(Romania) Elena-Gabriela Ruse	7	6

=== Twelfth qualifier ===
First round
12	(Belgium) Ysaline Bonaventure	4	6	6
(United States) Jamie Loeb	6	1	2
WC	(United Kingdom) Gabriella Taylor	7^{7}	6
(France) Chloé Paquet	6^{3}	4
(Georgia (country)) Ekaterine Gorgodze	7^{7}	7^{7}
(Hungary) Anna Bondár	6^{5}	6^{4}
(Poland) Magdalena Fręch	4	2
26	(Netherlands) Arantxa Rus	6	6

Second round
12	(Belgium) Ysaline Bonaventure	6	7^{7}
WC	(United Kingdom) Gabriella Taylor	4	6^{5}
(Georgia (country)) Ekaterine Gorgodze	3	3
26	(Netherlands) Arantxa Rus	6	6

Qualifying competition
12	(Belgium) Ysaline Bonaventure	3	6	6
26	(Netherlands) Arantxa Rus	6	1	4

=== Thirteenth qualifier ===
First round
13	(Czech Republic) Marie Bouzková	6	6
(Paraguay) Verónica Cepede Royg	4	4
(Ukraine) Anhelina Kalinina	6	6
(Georgia (country)) Mariam Bolkvadze	4	4
(Turkey) Pemra Özgen	6	6
(China) Zhang Yuxuan	1	1
(Switzerland) Ylena In-Albon	2	1
24	(Romania) Ana Bogdan	6	6

Second round
13	(Czech Republic) Marie Bouzková	6	7
(Ukraine) Anhelina Kalinina	0	5
(Turkey) Pemra Özgen	6^{1}	5
24	(Romania) Ana Bogdan	7^{7}	7

Qualifying competition
13	(Czech Republic) Marie Bouzková	3	1
24	(Romania) Ana Bogdan	6	6

=== Fourteenth qualifier ===
First round
14	(Serbia) Olga Danilović	6	7^{7}
WC	(United Kingdom) Eden Silva	4	6^{2}
(Slovakia) Rebecca Šramková	6^{5}	3
(France) Amandine Hesse	7^{7}	6
(Germany) Anna Zaja	7^{7}	6^{3}	6
(France) Myrtille Georges	6^{5}	7^{7}	3
(Argentina) Paula Ormaechea	7^{7}	4	2
17	(Brazil) Beatriz Haddad Maia	6^{4}	6	6

Second round
14	(Serbia) Olga Danilović	7^{7}	6^{4}	6
(France) Amandine Hesse	6^{2}	7^{7}	2
(Germany) Anna Zaja	6	4	2
17	(Brazil) Beatriz Haddad Maia	3	6	6

Qualifying competition
14	(Serbia) Olga Danilović	4	4
17	(Brazil) Beatriz Haddad Maia	6	6

=== Fifteenth qualifier ===
First round
15	(United States) Varvara Lepchenko	7^{7}	2	6
(Russia) Sofya Zhuk	6^{2}	6	0
(China) Xun Fangying	3	3
(Netherlands) Lesley Kerkhove	6	6
(Turkey) Çağla Büyükakçay	4	3
(India) Ankita Raina	6	6
WC	(Germany) Sabine Lisicki	6	3	6
27	(Hungary) Tímea Babos	3	6	3

Second round
15	(United States) Varvara Lepchenko	6	1	2
(Netherlands) Lesley Kerkhove	4	6	6
(India) Ankita Raina	1	6^{4}
WC	(Germany) Sabine Lisicki	6	7^{7}

Qualifying competition
(Netherlands) Lesley Kerkhove	0	6	6
WC	(Germany) Sabine Lisicki	6	4	4

=== Sixteenth qualifier ===
First round
16	(Czech Republic) Tereza Smitková	6^{4}	7	7
(Austria) Barbara Haas	7^{7}	5	5
(Russia) Valeria Savinykh	6	1	4
(Belgium) Yanina Wickmayer	4	6	6
WC	(United Kingdom) Maia Lumsden	4	4
(Australia) Kaylah McPhee	6	6
(China) Han Xinyun	3	6	1
31	(Russia) Liudmila Samsonova	6	2	6

Second round
16	(Czech Republic) Tereza Smitková	6	6^{3}	1
(Belgium) Yanina Wickmayer	1	7^{7}	6
(Australia) Kaylah McPhee	2	6^{5}
31	(Russia) Liudmila Samsonova	6	7^{7}

Qualifying competition
(Belgium) Yanina Wickmayer	6	6
31	(Russia) Liudmila Samsonova	4	3
