= 2019 Wimbledon Championships – Men's singles qualifying =

Men's singles qualifying
- 2019 Wimbledon Championships

Events
Singles	men	women		boys	girls
Doubles	men	women	mixed	boys	girls
WC Singles	men	women	quad
WC Doubles	men	women	quad
Legends	men	women	seniors

Qualification
Singles	men	women
- Wimbledon Championships

Players who neither have high enough rankings nor receive wild cards may participate in a qualifying tournament held one week before the annual Wimbledon Tennis Championships.

== Seeds ==
1. (France) Corentin Moutet (qualified)
2. (Switzerland) Henri Laaksonen (first round)
3. (Germany) Yannick Maden (first round)
4. (Australia) Alexei Popyrin (qualified)
5. (Italy) Stefano Travaglia (first round)
6. (Brazil) Thiago Monteiro (qualified)
7. (Czech Republic) Jiří Veselý (qualified)
8. (Canada) Brayden Schnur (qualifying competition, lucky loser)
9. (Spain) Marcel Granollers (qualified)
10. (France) Antoine Hoang (second round)
11. (Poland) Kamil Majchrzak (qualified)
12. (France) Grégoire Barrère (qualified)
13. (Chinese Taipei) Jason Jung (first round)
14. (Austria) Dennis Novak (qualified)
15. (Germany) Matthias Bachinger (first round)
16. (Sweden) Elias Ymer (first round)
17. (Ukraine) Sergiy Stakhovsky (second round)
18. (Italy) Salvatore Caruso (qualified)
19. (Sweden) Mikael Ymer (qualifying competition)
20. (Slovakia) Andrej Martin (first round)
21. (Spain) Pedro Martínez (second round)
22. (Italy) Gianluca Mager (second round)
23. (Russia) Evgeny Donskoy (second round)
24. (South Korea) Kwon Soon-woo (qualified)
25. (Germany) Oscar Otte (second round)
26. (Spain) Alejandro Davidovich Fokina (first round)
27. (United States) Bjorn Fratangelo (qualifying competition)
28. (Argentina) Facundo Bagnis (first round)
29. (Czech Republic) Lukáš Rosol (qualifying competition)
30. (United States) Tommy Paul (qualifying competition)
31. (Canada) Peter Polansky (first round)
32. (Italy) Lorenzo Giustino (first round)

== Qualifiers ==
1. (France) Corentin Moutet
2. (Japan) Yasutaka Uchiyama
3. (Italy) Andrea Arnaboldi
4. (Australia) Alexei Popyrin
5. (South Korea) Kwon Soon-woo
6. (Brazil) Thiago Monteiro
7. (Czech Republic) Jiří Veselý
8. (Italy) Salvatore Caruso
9. (Spain) Marcel Granollers
10. (United States) Marcos Giron
11. (Poland) Kamil Majchrzak
12. (France) Grégoire Barrère
13. (United States) Noah Rubin
14. (Austria) Dennis Novak
15. (Japan) Yūichi Sugita
16. (Belgium) Ruben Bemelmans

== Lucky loser ==
1. (Canada) Brayden Schnur

== Qualifying draw ==
=== First qualifier ===
First round
1	(France) Corentin Moutet	6	3	8
(Austria) Lucas Miedler	4	6	6
(United States) Mitchell Krueger	5	4
(United States) Tim Smyczek	7	6
(Spain) Enrique López Pérez	2	5
(Australia) Andrew Harris	6	7
(Barbados) Darian King	3	2
17	(Ukraine) Sergiy Stakhovsky	6	6

Second round
1	(France) Corentin Moutet	6	6
(United States) Tim Smyczek	1	3
(Australia) Andrew Harris	3	6	6
17	(Ukraine) Sergiy Stakhovsky	6	3	3

Qualifying competition
1	(France) Corentin Moutet	6	6	6
(Australia) Andrew Harris	2	4	4

=== Second qualifier ===
First round
2	(Switzerland) Henri Laaksonen	2	7	5
(Australia) Jason Kubler	6	5	7
(Slovakia) Norbert Gombos	6	6
(Czech Republic) Zdeněk Kolář	1	3
WC	(United Kingdom) Jack Draper	4	6^{0}
(Japan) Yasutaka Uchiyama	6	7^{7}
(Bosnia and Herzegovina) Mirza Bašić	6^{2}	6^{6}
23	(Russia) Evgeny Donskoy	7^{7}	7^{8}

Second round
(Australia) Jason Kubler	7^{7}	7^{7}
(Slovakia) Norbert Gombos	6^{5}	6^{1}
(Japan) Yasutaka Uchiyama	7^{7}	6
23	(Russia) Evgeny Donskoy	6^{5}	2

Qualifying competition
(Australia) Jason Kubler	3	6	7	3	3
(Japan) Yasutaka Uchiyama	6	4	5	6	6

=== Third qualifier ===
First round
3	(Germany) Yannick Maden	6	3	4
(Japan) Hiroki Moriya	4	6	6
WC	(United Kingdom) Ryan Peniston	1	7	6
(Italy) Andrea Arnaboldi	6	5	8
(Russia) Evgeny Karlovskiy	6	7
(Belgium) Kimmer Coppejans	3	5
(Slovakia) Filip Horanský	4	4
21	(Spain) Pedro Martínez	6	6

Second round
(Japan) Hiroki Moriya	7^{7}	4	2
(Italy) Andrea Arnaboldi	6^{0}	6	6
(Russia) Evgeny Karlovskiy	6	6
21	(Spain) Pedro Martínez	3	3

Qualifying competition
(Italy) Andrea Arnaboldi	6	6	3	4	6
(Russia) Evgeny Karlovskiy	4	3	6	6	3

=== Fourth qualifier ===
First round
4	(Australia) Alexei Popyrin	6	7
(Argentina) Federico Coria	2	5
(Germany) Mats Moraing	6	7
(Italy) Federico Gaio	2	5
(Estonia) Jürgen Zopp	6^{4}	6^{2}
(France) Quentin Halys	7^{7}	7^{7}
(Russia) Alexey Vatutin	4	4
27	(United States) Bjorn Fratangelo	6	6

Second round
4	(Australia) Alexei Popyrin	6	3	6
(Germany) Mats Moraing	1	6	1
(France) Quentin Halys	6	2	11
27	(United States) Bjorn Fratangelo	3	6	13

Qualifying competition
4	(Australia) Alexei Popyrin	6	7^{8}	6^{4}	7^{8}
27	(United States) Bjorn Fratangelo	3	6^{6}	7^{7}	6^{6}

=== Fifth qualifier ===
First round
5	(Italy) Stefano Travaglia	7^{9}	2	4
(Slovenia) Blaž Rola	6^{7}	6	6
(Germany) Daniel Brands	6	6
WC	(United Kingdom) Mark Whitehouse	3	4
(Australia) Marc Polmans	6	6
(Egypt) Mohamed Safwat	1	3
(Portugal) João Domingues	0	3
24	(South Korea) Kwon Soon-woo	6	6

Second round
(Slovenia) Blaž Rola	7^{7}	6^{7}	5
(Germany) Daniel Brands	6^{5}	7^{9}	7
(Australia) Marc Polmans	2	2
24	(South Korea) Kwon Soon-woo	6	6

Qualifying competition
(Germany) Daniel Brands	2	7^{8}	1	0
24	(South Korea) Kwon Soon-woo	6	6^{6}	6	6

=== Sixth qualifier ===
First round
6	(Brazil) Thiago Monteiro	7^{7}	7^{7}
(Italy) Roberto Marcora	6^{5}	6^{3}
(United States) Christopher Eubanks	7^{11}	3	6
(Italy) Luca Vanni	6^{9}	6	3
(Japan) Go Soeda	6	3	6
(Italy) Filippo Baldi	4	6	1
(Japan) Yosuke Watanuki	4	7^{8}	6
26	(Spain) Alejandro Davidovich Fokina	6	6^{6}	1

Second round
6	(Brazil) Thiago Monteiro	7^{8}	6
(United States) Christopher Eubanks	6^{6}	3
(Japan) Go Soeda	5	4
(Japan) Yosuke Watanuki	7	6

Qualifying competition
6	(Brazil) Thiago Monteiro	3	7^{7}	6	6
(Japan) Yosuke Watanuki	6	6^{3}	3	3

=== Seventh qualifier ===
First round
7	(Czech Republic) Jiří Veselý	6	6
(Italy) Simone Bolelli	4	2
(Spain) Adrián Menéndez Maceiras	1	6	6
(Israel) Dudi Sela	6	0	4
(Serbia) Nikola Milojević	6	6^{6}	3
(Denmark) Mikael Torpegaard	4	7^{8}	6
WC	(Chinese Taipei) Tseng Chun-hsin	3	3
30	(United States) Tommy Paul	6	6

Second round
7	(Czech Republic) Jiří Veselý	6	6
(Spain) Adrián Menéndez Maceiras	3	1
(Denmark) Mikael Torpegaard	6	4	4
30	(United States) Tommy Paul	0	6	6

Qualifying competition
7	(Czech Republic) Jiří Veselý	6	6	6
30	(United States) Tommy Paul	2	3	3

=== Eighth qualifier ===
First round
8	(Canada) Brayden Schnur	6	6
(France) Maxime Janvier	3	2
(Canada) Steven Diez	6	6
(Japan) Tatsuma Ito	4	1
(Australia) John-Patrick Smith	6	6
WC	(France) Nicolas Mahut	3	4
(China) Zhang Ze	6	5	1
18	(Italy) Salvatore Caruso	4	7	6

Second round
8	(Canada) Brayden Schnur	6	6
(Canada) Steven Diez	3	4
(Australia) John-Patrick Smith	6	3	4
18	(Italy) Salvatore Caruso	3	6	6

Qualifying competition
8	(Canada) Brayden Schnur	3	2	1
18	(Italy) Salvatore Caruso	6	6	6

=== Ninth qualifier ===
First round
9	(Spain) Marcel Granollers	6	6
(Serbia) Peđa Krstin	2	4
PR	(Slovenia) Blaž Kavčič	6	7^{9}
(Argentina) Facundo Argüello	3	6^{7}
PR	(Ukraine) Illya Marchenko	7^{7}	7
(Argentina) Marco Trungelliti	6^{5}	5
(Hungary) Attila Balázs	6	6
31	(Canada) Peter Polansky	1	1

Second round
9	(Spain) Marcel Granollers	6	6
PR	(Slovenia) Blaž Kavčič	3	3
PR	(Ukraine) Illya Marchenko	6	6^{5}	3
(Hungary) Attila Balázs	2	7^{7}	6

Qualifying competition
9	(Spain) Marcel Granollers	7^{7}	6	6
(Hungary) Attila Balázs	6^{5}	3	3

=== Tenth qualifier ===
First round
10	(France) Antoine Hoang	7^{9}	6
(Japan) Kaichi Uchida	6^{7}	4
(Belgium) Arthur De Greef	2	3
(United States) Marcos Giron	6	6
(Australia) James Duckworth	6	7
WC	(United Kingdom) Jan Choinski	1	5
(Croatia) Viktor Galović	7^{7}	7^{7}
28	(Argentina) Facundo Bagnis	6^{0}	6^{2}

Second round
10	(France) Antoine Hoang	4	6^{3}
(United States) Marcos Giron	6	7^{7}
(Australia) James Duckworth	6	3	9
(Croatia) Viktor Galović	3	6	11

Qualifying competition
(United States) Marcos Giron	7	6	2	6
(Croatia) Viktor Galović	5	2	6	4

=== Eleventh qualifier ===
First round
11	(Poland) Kamil Majchrzak	6	6
(France) Constant Lestienne	1	2
(India) Ramkumar Ramanathan	6	6
(Slovakia) Lukáš Lacko	3	2
(France) Enzo Couacaud	3	6	6
(Austria) Sebastian Ofner	6	3	1
(Kazakhstan) Aleksandr Nedovyesov	3	7	4
22	(Italy) Gianluca Mager	6	5	6

Second round
11	(Poland) Kamil Majchrzak	7^{7}	6
(India) Ramkumar Ramanathan	6^{5}	3
(France) Enzo Couacaud	6	6
22	(Italy) Gianluca Mager	3	4

Qualifying competition
11	(Poland) Kamil Majchrzak	6	6	6
(France) Enzo Couacaud	2	4	0

=== Twelfth qualifier ===
First round
12	(France) Grégoire Barrère	4	7^{7}	6
(Ecuador) Emilio Gómez	6	6^{5}	2
WC	(United Kingdom) Evan Hoyt	6^{10}	6^{5}
(Brazil) Rogério Dutra Silva	7^{12}	7^{7}
(Netherlands) Tallon Griekspoor	6	6^{5}	6
(Argentina) Pedro Cachin	2	7^{7}	3
WC	(United Kingdom) Liam Broady	6	6
20	(Slovakia) Andrej Martin	3	1

Second round
12	(France) Grégoire Barrère	6	7^{7}
(Brazil) Rogério Dutra Silva	3	6^{0}
(Netherlands) Tallon Griekspoor	4	7^{7}	2
WC	(United Kingdom) Liam Broady	6	6^{2}	6

Qualifying competition
12	(France) Grégoire Barrère	3	0	6	6	6
WC	(United Kingdom) Liam Broady	6	6	2	4	3

=== Thirteenth qualifier ===
First round
13	(Chinese Taipei) Jason Jung	6^{5}	6^{0}
(Ecuador) Roberto Quiroz	7^{7}	7^{7}
(United States) Michael Mmoh	3	4
(United States) Noah Rubin	6	6
(Germany) Yannick Hanfmann	7	7
(Italy) Alessandro Giannessi	5	5
(Colombia) Santiago Giraldo	3	5
25	(Germany) Oscar Otte	6	7

Second round
(Ecuador) Roberto Quiroz	6	1	2
(United States) Noah Rubin	4	6	6
(Germany) Yannick Hanfmann	7^{7}	6
25	(Germany) Oscar Otte	6^{5}	1

Qualifying competition
(United States) Noah Rubin	7^{7}	6	4	6
(Germany) Yannick Hanfmann	6^{5}	2	6	2

=== Fourteenth qualifier ===
First round
14	(Austria) Dennis Novak	6	6
(Netherlands) Thiemo de Bakker	4	3
(Italy) Jannik Sinner	6	5	10
(Australia) Alex Bolt	2	7	12
(China) Li Zhe	6^{2}	3
(Germany) Dustin Brown	7^{7}	6
WC	(United Kingdom) Aidan McHugh	4	0
19	(Sweden) Mikael Ymer	6	6

Second round
14	(Austria) Dennis Novak	6	6
(Australia) Alex Bolt	4	2
(Germany) Dustin Brown	6^{5}	2
19	(Sweden) Mikael Ymer	7^{7}	6

Qualifying competition
14	(Austria) Dennis Novak	7^{7}	7^{7}	4	6
19	(Sweden) Mikael Ymer	6^{4}	6^{1}	6	2

=== Fifteenth qualifier ===
First round
15	(Germany) Matthias Bachinger	5	6	4
(Italy) Stefano Napolitano	7	1	6
(Argentina) Carlos Berlocq	4	2
(Japan) Yūichi Sugita	6	6
(Spain) Guillermo García López	6	4	7
(India) Saketh Myneni	4	6	5
(Spain) Sergio Gutiérrez Ferrol	3	0
29	(Czech Republic) Lukáš Rosol	6	6

Second round
(Italy) Stefano Napolitano	6	3	4
(Japan) Yūichi Sugita	4	6	6
(Spain) Guillermo García López	5	6	6
29	(Czech Republic) Lukáš Rosol	7	3	8

Qualifying competition
(Japan) Yūichi Sugita	6	6	6
29	(Czech Republic) Lukáš Rosol	4	3	2

=== Sixteenth qualifier ===
First round
16	(Sweden) Elias Ymer	3	7^{7}	4
(Belgium) Ruben Bemelmans	6	6^{4}	6
(Austria) Jurij Rodionov	3	1
(Australia) Akira Santillan	6	6
(United States) Donald Young	6	7^{7}
(Belarus) Egor Gerasimov	4	6^{3}
(Colombia) Daniel Elahi Galán	7^{7}	6
32	(Italy) Lorenzo Giustino	6^{2}	3

Second round
(Belgium) Ruben Bemelmans	6^{5}	6	12
(Australia) Akira Santillan	7^{7}	3	10
(United States) Donald Young	7^{7}	6
(Colombia) Daniel Elahi Galán	6^{4}	3

Qualifying competition
(Belgium) Ruben Bemelmans	6	6	6
(United States) Donald Young	4	4	1
