= 2019 Wimbledon Championships – Day-by-day summaries =

The 2019 Wimbledon Championships are described below in detail, in the form of day-by-day summaries.

All dates are BST (UTC+1).

== Day 1 (1 July) ==
- Seeds out:
  - Gentlemen's Singles: (Germany) Alexander Zverev [6], (Greece) Stefanos Tsitsipas [7], (France) Gaël Monfils [16], (Serbia) Dušan Lajović [32]
  - Ladies' Singles: (Japan) Naomi Osaka [2], (Belarus) Aryna Sabalenka [10], (Czech Republic) Markéta Vondroušová [14], (France) Caroline Garcia [23], (Russia) Daria Kasatkina [29]
- Schedule of play

Matches on main courts
Matches on Centre Court
Event	Winner	Loser	Score
Gentlemen's Singles 1st Round	(Serbia) Novak Djokovic [1]	(Germany) Philipp Kohlschreiber	6–3, 7–5, 6–3
Ladies' Singles 1st Round	(Kazakhstan) Yulia Putintseva	(Japan) Naomi Osaka [2]	7–6^{(7–4)}, 6–2
Gentlemen's Singles 1st Round	(United Kingdom) Kyle Edmund [30]	(Spain) Jaume Munar	6–4, 6–4, 6–4
Matches on No. 1 Court
Event	Winner	Loser	Score
Ladies' Singles 1st Round	(Romania) Simona Halep [7]	(Belarus) Aliaksandra Sasnovich	6–4, 7–5
Gentlemen's Singles 1st Round	(Czech Republic) Jiří Veselý [Q]	(Germany) Alexander Zverev [6]	4–6, 6–3, 6–2, 7–5
Ladies' Singles 1st Round	(United States) Cori Gauff [Q]	(United States) Venus Williams	6–4, 6–4
Matches on No. 2 Court
Event	Winner	Loser	Score
Gentlemen's Singles 1st Round	(Switzerland) Stan Wawrinka [22]	(Belgium) Ruben Bemelmans [Q]	6–3, 6–2, 6–2
Ladies' Singles 1st Round	(Czech Republic) Karolína Plíšková [3]	(China) Zhu Lin	6–2, 7–6^{(7–4)}
Gentlemen's Singles 1st Round	(Italy) Thomas Fabbiano	(Greece) Stefanos Tsitsipas [7]	6–4, 3–6, 6–4, 6–7^{(8–10)}, 6–3
Ladies' Singles 1st Round	(Denmark) Caroline Wozniacki [14]	(Spain) Sara Sorribes Tormo	5–4, retired
Matches on No. 3 Court
Event	Winner	Loser	Score
Gentlemen's Singles 1st Round	(South Africa) Kevin Anderson [4]	(France) Pierre-Hugues Herbert	6–3, 6–4, 6–2
Ladies' Singles 1st Round	(Slovakia) Magdaléna Rybáriková	(Belarus) Aryna Sabalenka [10]	6–2, 6–4
Ladies' Singles 1st Round	(Latvia) Anastasija Sevastova [12]	(United States) Kristie Ahn [Q]	6–3, 6–4
Gentlemen's Singles 1st Round	(France) Ugo Humbert	(France) Gaël Monfils [16]	6–7^{(6–8)}, 3–6, 6–4, 7–5, 3–0, retired

== Day 2 (2 July) ==
- Seeds out:
  - Gentlemen's Singles: (Austria) Dominic Thiem [5], (Canada) Denis Shapovalov [29]
  - Ladies' Singles: (Croatia) Donna Vekić [22], (Spain) Garbiñe Muguruza [26], (Ukraine) Lesia Tsurenko [32]
- Schedule of play

Matches on main courts
Matches on Centre Court
Event	Winner	Loser	Score
Ladies' Singles 1st Round	(Germany) Angelique Kerber [5]	(Germany) Tatjana Maria	6–4, 6–3
Gentlemen's Singles 1st Round	(Switzerland) Roger Federer [2]	(South Africa) Lloyd Harris	3–6, 6–1, 6–2, 6–2
Ladies' Singles 1st Round	(United States) Serena Williams [11]	(Italy) Giulia Gatto-Monticone [Q]	6–2, 7–5
Ladies' Singles 1st Round	(Netherlands) Kiki Bertens [4]	(Luxembourg) Mandy Minella	6–3, 6–2
Matches on No. 1 Court
Event	Winner	Loser	Score
Ladies' Singles 1st Round	(Australia) Ashleigh Barty [1]	(China) Zheng Saisai	6–4, 6–2
Ladies' Singles 1st Round	(United Kingdom) Johanna Konta [19]	(Romania) Ana Bogdan [Q]	7–5, 6–2
Gentlemen's Singles 1st Round	(Spain) Rafael Nadal [3]	(Japan) Yūichi Sugita [Q]	6–3, 6–1, 6–3
Ladies' Singles 1st Round	(United States) Alison Riske	(Croatia) Donna Vekić [22]	3–6, 6–3, 7–5
Matches on No. 2 Court
Event	Winner	Loser	Score
Ladies' Singles 1st Round	(United States) Sloane Stephens [9]	(Switzerland) Timea Bacsinszky	6–2, 6–4
Gentlemen's Singles 1st Round	(United States) Sam Querrey	(Austria) Dominic Thiem [5]	6–7^{(4–7)}, 7–6^{(7–1)}, 6–3, 6–0
Ladies' Singles 1st Round	(France) Pauline Parmentier	(Russia) Maria Sharapova	4–6, 7–6^{(7–4)}, 5–0, retired
Gentlemen's Singles 1st Round	(United States) John Isner [9]	(Norway) Casper Ruud	6–3, 6–4, 7–6^{(11–9)}
Matches on No. 3 Court
Event	Winner	Loser	Score
Gentlemen's Singles 1st Round	(Australia) Nick Kyrgios	(Australia) Jordan Thompson	7–6^{(7–4)}, 3–6, 7–6^{(12–10)}, 0–6, 6–1
Ladies' Singles 1st Round	(Brazil) Beatriz Haddad Maia [Q]	(Spain) Garbiñe Muguruza [26]	6–4, 6–4
Ladies' Singles 1st Round	(Czech Republic) Petra Kvitová [6]	(Tunisia) Ons Jabeur	6–4, 6–2
Gentlemen's Singles 1st Round	(Croatia) Marin Čilić [13]	(France) Adrian Mannarino	7–6^{(8–6)}, 7–6^{(7–4)}, 6–3

== Day 3 (3 July) ==
- Seeds out:
  - Gentlemen's Singles: (Switzerland) Stan Wawrinka [22], (United Kingdom) Kyle Edmund [30]
  - Ladies' Singles: (Latvia) Anastasija Sevastova [12], (United States) Madison Keys [17], (United States) Sofia Kenin [27]
  - Gentlemen's Doubles: (Germany) Kevin Krawietz / (Germany) Andreas Mies [13], (United Kingdom) Dominic Inglot / (United States) Austin Krajicek [15]
- Schedule of play

Matches on main courts
Matches on Centre Court
Event	Winner	Loser	Score
Ladies' Singles 2nd Round	(Czech Republic) Karolína Plíšková [3]	(Puerto Rico) Monica Puig	6–0, 6–4
Gentlemen's Singles 2nd Round	(Spain) Fernando Verdasco	(United Kingdom) Kyle Edmund [30]	4–6, 4–6, 7–6^{(7–3)}, 6–3, 6–4
Gentlemen's Singles 2nd Round	(Serbia) Novak Djokovic [1]	(United States) Denis Kudla	6–3, 6–2, 6–2
Matches on No. 1 Court
Event	Winner	Loser	Score
Ladies' Singles 2nd Round	(Estonia) Anett Kontaveit [20]	(United Kingdom) Heather Watson	7–5, 6–1
Gentlemen's Singles 2nd Round	(Russia) Karen Khachanov [10]	(Spain) Feliciano López [WC]	4–6, 6–4, 7–5, 6–4
Ladies' Singles 2nd Round	(Denmark) Caroline Wozniacki [14]	(Russia) Veronika Kudermetova	7–6^{(7–5)}, 6–3
Ladies' Singles 2nd Round	(United States) Cori Gauff [Q]	(Slovakia) Magdaléna Rybáriková	6–3, 6–3
Matches on No. 2 Court
Event	Winner	Loser	Score
Gentlemen's Singles 2nd Round	(United States) Reilly Opelka	(Switzerland) Stan Wawrinka [22]	7–5, 3–6, 4–6, 6–4, 8–6
Ladies' Singles 2nd Round	(Romania) Simona Halep [7]	(Romania) Mihaela Buzărnescu	6–3, 4–6, 6–2
Gentlemen's Singles 2nd Round	(South Africa) Kevin Anderson [4]	(Serbia) Janko Tipsarević [PR]	6–4, 6–7^{(5–7)}, 6–1, 6–4
Matches on No. 3 Court
Event	Winner	Loser	Score
Ladies' Singles 2nd Round	(Ukraine) Elina Svitolina [8]	(Russia) Margarita Gasparyan	5–7, 6–5, retired
Gentlemen's Singles 2nd Round	(Canada) Milos Raonic [15]	(Netherlands) Robin Haase	7–6^{(7–1)}, 7–5, 7–6^{(7–4)}
Gentlemen's Singles 2nd Round	(Canada) Félix Auger-Aliassime [19]	(France) Corentin Moutet [Q]	6–3, 4–6, 6–4, 6–2
Ladies' Singles 2nd Round	(Slovenia) Polona Hercog	(United States) Madison Keys [17]	6–2, 6–4

== Day 4 (4 July) ==
- Seeds out:
  - Gentlemen's Singles: (United States) John Isner [9], (Croatia) Marin Čilić [13], (Georgia (country)) Nikoloz Basilashvili [18], (France) Gilles Simon [20], (Australia) Alex de Minaur [25], (Serbia) Laslo Đere [31]
  - Ladies' Singles: (Germany) Angelique Kerber [5], (United States) Amanda Anisimova [25]
  - Ladies' Doubles: (Czech Republic) Lucie Hradecká / (Slovenia) Andreja Klepač [11], (Russia) Veronika Kudermetova / (Latvia) Jeļena Ostapenko [14]
- Schedule of play

Matches on main courts
Matches on Centre Court
Event	Winner	Loser	Score
Gentlemen's Singles 2nd Round	(Japan) Kei Nishikori [8]	(United Kingdom) Cameron Norrie	6−4, 6−4, 6−0
Ladies' Singles 2nd Round	(United Kingdom) Johanna Konta [19]	(Czech Republic) Kateřina Siniaková	6–3, 6–4
Gentlemen's Singles 2nd Round	(Spain) Rafael Nadal [3]	(Australia) Nick Kyrgios	6−3, 3−6, 7−6^{(7−5)}, 7−6^{(7−3)}
Matches on No. 1 Court
Event	Winner	Loser	Score
Ladies' Singles 2nd Round	(Czech Republic) Petra Kvitová [6]	(France) Kristina Mladenovic	7−5, 6−2
Gentlemen's Singles 2nd Round	(Switzerland) Roger Federer [2]	(United Kingdom) Jay Clarke [WC]	6–1, 7–6^{(7–3)}, 6–2
Ladies' Singles 2nd Round	(United States) Serena Williams [11]	(Slovenia) Kaja Juvan [Q]	2–6, 6–2, 6–4
Gentlemen's Doubles 1st Round	(France) Pierre-Hugues Herbert [PR] (United Kingdom) Andy Murray [PR]	(Romania) Marius Copil (France) Ugo Humbert	4–6, 6–1, 6–4, 6–0
Matches on No. 2 Court
Event	Winner	Loser	Score
Ladies' Singles 2nd Round	(Australia) Ashleigh Barty [1]	(Belgium) Alison Van Uytvanck	6–1, 6–3
Gentlemen's Singles 2nd Round	(United Kingdom) Dan Evans	(Georgia (country)) Nikoloz Basilashvili [18]	6–3, 6–2, 7–6^{(7–2)}
Ladies' Singles 2nd Round	(United States) Lauren Davis [LL]	(Germany) Angelique Kerber [5]	2–6, 6–2, 6–1
Gentlemen's Singles 2nd Round	(Italy) Matteo Berrettini [17]	(Cyprus) Marcos Baghdatis [WC]	6–1, 7–6^{(7–4)}, 6–3
Matches on No. 3 Court
Event	Winner	Loser	Score
Ladies' Singles 2nd Round	(United States) Sloane Stephens [9]	(China) Wang Yafan	6–0, 6–2
Gentlemen's Singles 2nd Round	(Kazakhstan) Mikhail Kukushkin	(United States) John Isner [9]	6–4, 6–7^{(3–7)}, 4–6, 6–1, 6–4
Gentlemen's Singles 2nd Round	(Italy) Fabio Fognini [12]	(Hungary) Márton Fucsovics	6–7^{(6–8)}, 6–4, 7–6^{(7–3)}, 2–6, 6–3

== Day 5 (5 July) ==
- Seeds out:
  - Gentlemen's Singles: (South Africa) Kevin Anderson [4], (Russia) Karen Khachanov [10], (Russia) Daniil Medvedev [11], (Canada) Félix Auger-Aliassime [19]
  - Ladies' Singles: (Denmark) Caroline Wozniacki [14], (Estonia) Anett Kontaveit [20], (Chinese Taipei) Hsieh Su-wei [28], (Greece) Maria Sakkari [31]
  - Gentlemen's Doubles: (Croatia) Mate Pavić / (Brazil) Bruno Soares [4], (United Kingdom) Jamie Murray / (United Kingdom) Neal Skupski [10]
  - Ladies' Doubles: (Belgium) Kirsten Flipkens / (Sweden) Johanna Larsson [12]
- Schedule of play

Matches on main courts
Matches on Centre Court
Event	Winner	Loser	Score
Gentlemen's Singles 3rd Round	(Argentina) Guido Pella [26]	(South Africa) Kevin Anderson [4]	6–4, 6–3, 7–6^{(7–4)}
Ladies' Singles 3rd Round	(Romania) Simona Halep [7]	(Belarus) Victoria Azarenka	6–3, 6–1
Ladies' Singles 3rd Round	(United States) Cori Gauff [Q]	(Slovenia) Polona Hercog	3–6, 7–6^{(9–7)}, 7–5
Matches on No. 1 Court
Event	Winner	Loser	Score
Ladies' Singles 3rd Round	(Czech Republic) Karolína Plíšková [3]	(Chinese Taipei) Hsieh Su-wei [28]	6–3, 2–6, 6–4
Gentlemen's Singles 3rd Round	(Serbia) Novak Djokovic [1]	(Poland) Hubert Hurkacz	7–5, 6–7^{(5–7)}, 6–1, 6–4
Gentlemen's Singles 3rd Round	(France) Ugo Humbert	(Canada) Félix Auger-Aliassime [19]	6–4, 7–5, 6–3
Matches on No. 2 Court
Event	Winner	Loser	Score
Ladies' Singles 3rd Round	(China) Zhang Shuai	(Denmark) Caroline Wozniacki [14]	6−4, 6−2
Gentlemen's Singles 3rd Round	(Spain) Roberto Bautista Agut [23]	(Russia) Karen Khachanov [10]	6–3, 7–6^{(7–3)}, 6–1
Gentlemen's Singles 3rd Round	(Belgium) David Goffin [21]	(Russia) Daniil Medvedev [11]	4–6, 6–2, 3–6, 6–3, 7–5
Mixed Doubles 1st Round	(Finland) Henri Kontinen (United Kingdom) Heather Watson	(Brazil) Marcelo Demoliner (United States) Abigail Spears	6–3, 6–2
Matches on No. 3 Court
Event	Winner	Loser	Score
Ladies' Singles 3rd Round	(Ukraine) Elina Svitolina [8]	(Greece) Maria Sakkari [31]	6−3, 6−7^{(1−7)}, 6−2
Ladies' Singles 3rd Round	(Czech Republic) Karolína Muchová	(Estonia) Anett Kontaveit [20]	7–6^{(9–7)}, 6–3
Gentlemen's Singles 3rd Round	(Spain) Fernando Verdasco	(Italy) Thomas Fabbiano	6–4, 7–6^{(7–1)}, 6–4
Mixed Doubles 1st Round	(United Kingdom) Jamie Murray (United States) Bethanie Mattek-Sands	(United Kingdom) Joe Salisbury [WC] (United Kingdom) Katy Dunne [WC]	7–5, 7–6^{(10–8)}

== Day 6 (6 July) ==
- Seeds out:
  - Gentlemen's Singles: (Italy) Fabio Fognini [12], (Argentina) Diego Schwartzman [24], (France) Lucas Pouille [27], (Germany) Jan-Lennard Struff [33]
  - Ladies' Singles: (Netherlands) Kiki Bertens [4], (United States) Sloane Stephens [9], (Switzerland) Belinda Bencic [13], (China) Wang Qiang [15], (Germany) Julia Görges [18]
  - Gentlemen's Doubles: (Austria) Oliver Marach / (Austria) Jürgen Melzer [14]
  - Ladies' Doubles: (Australia) Samantha Stosur / (China) Zhang Shuai [5], (United States) Raquel Atawo / (Ukraine) Lyudmyla Kichenok [16]
  - Mixed Doubles: (Netherlands) Jean-Julien Rojer / (Netherlands) Demi Schuurs [2], (United Kingdom) Neal Skupski / (Chinese Taipei) Chan Hao-ching [9], (India) Rohan Bopanna / (Belarus) Aryna Sabalenka [13], (India) Divij Sharan / (China) Duan Yingying [16]
- Schedule of play

Matches on main courts
Matches on Centre Court
Event	Winner	Loser	Score
Ladies' Singles 3rd Round	(Australia) Ashleigh Barty [1]	(United Kingdom) Harriet Dart [WC]	6−1, 6−1
Gentlemen's Singles 3rd Round	(Spain) Rafael Nadal [3]	(France) Jo-Wilfried Tsonga	6−2, 6−3, 6−2
Gentlemen's Singles 3rd Round	(Switzerland) Roger Federer [2]	(France) Lucas Pouille [27]	7−5, 6−2, 7−6^{(7−4)}
Mixed Doubles 1st Round	(United Kingdom) Andy Murray [PR] (United States) Serena Williams [PR]	(Germany) Andreas Mies (Chile) Alexa Guarachi	6−4, 6−1
Matches on No. 1 Court
Event	Winner	Loser	Score
Ladies' Singles 3rd Round	(United States) Serena Williams [11]	(Germany) Julia Görges [18]	6−3, 6−4
Ladies' Singles 3rd Round	(United Kingdom) Johanna Konta [19]	(United States) Sloane Stephens [9]	3−6, 6−4, 6−1
Gentlemen's Singles 3rd Round	(Portugal) João Sousa	(United Kingdom) Dan Evans	4−6, 6−4, 7−5, 4−6, 6−4
Matches on No. 2 Court
Event	Winner	Loser	Score
Ladies' Singles 3rd Round	(Czech Republic) Petra Kvitová [6]	(Poland) Magda Linette	6−3, 6−2
Gentlemen's Doubles 2nd Round	(Croatia) Nikola Mektić [6] (Croatia) Franko Škugor [6]	(France) Pierre-Hugues Herbert [PR] (United Kingdom) Andy Murray [PR]	6−7^{(4−7)}, 6−4, 6−2, 6−3
Mixed Doubles 1st Round	(Sweden) Robert Lindstedt (Latvia) Jeļena Ostapenko	(United Kingdom) Jay Clarke [WC] (United States) Cori Gauff [WC]	6−1, 6−4
Ladies' Doubles 2nd Round	(Belarus) Victoria Azarenka [10] (Australia) Ashleigh Barty [10]	(Sweden) Rebecca Peterson (Slovenia) Tamara Zidanšek	6−2, 6−3
Matches on No. 3 Court
Event	Winner	Loser	Score
Gentlemen's Singles 3rd Round	(Japan) Kei Nishikori [8]	(United States) Steve Johnson	6−4, 6−3, 6−2
Ladies' Singles 3rd Round	(Czech Republic) Barbora Strýcová	(Netherlands) Kiki Bertens [4]	7–5, 6–1
Gentlemen's Doubles 2nd Round	(United States) Bob Bryan [7] (United States) Mike Bryan [7]	(El Salvador) Marcelo Arévalo (Mexico) Miguel Ángel Reyes-Varela	6−7^{(13−15)}, 6−3, 6−4, 6−1
Mixed Doubles 2nd Round	(Australia) John Peers [4] (China) Zhang Shuai [4]	(Finland) Henri Kontinen (United Kingdom) Heather Watson	4−6, 6−3, 6−4

== Middle Sunday (7 July) ==
As is tradition, Middle Sunday is a day of rest and no matches are played.

== Day 7 (8 July) ==
- Seeds out:
  - Gentlemen's Singles: (Canada) Milos Raonic [15], (Italy) Matteo Berrettini [17], (France) Benoît Paire [28]
  - Ladies' Singles: (Australia) Ashleigh Barty [1], (Czech Republic) Karolína Plíšková [3], (Czech Republic) Petra Kvitová [6], (Belgium) Elise Mertens [21], (Croatia) Petra Martić [24], (Spain) Carla Suárez Navarro [30]
  - Gentlemen's Doubles: (Croatia) Nikola Mektić / (Croatia) Franko Škugor [6], (United States) Bob Bryan / (United States) Mike Bryan [7], (Argentina) Máximo González / (Argentina) Horacio Zeballos [9], (Netherlands) Robin Haase / (Denmark) Frederik Nielsen [16]
  - Ladies' Doubles: (Belarus) Victoria Azarenka / (Australia) Ashleigh Barty [10], (China) Duan Yingying / (China) Zheng Saisai [13]
  - Mixed Doubles: (Argentina) Máximo González / (China) Xu Yifan [7], (New Zealand) Michael Venus / (Slovenia) Katarina Srebotnik [10]
- Schedule of play

Matches on main courts
Matches on Centre Court
Event	Winner	Loser	Score
Gentlemen's Singles 4th Round	(Spain) Rafael Nadal [3]	(Portugal) João Sousa	6−2, 6−2, 6−2
Ladies' Singles 4th Round	(United Kingdom) Johanna Konta [19]	(Czech Republic) Petra Kvitová [6]	4−6, 6−2, 6−4
Gentlemen's Singles 4th Round	(Switzerland) Roger Federer [2]	(Italy) Matteo Berrettini [17]	6−1, 6−2, 6−2
Matches on No. 1 Court
Event	Winner	Loser	Score
Ladies' Singles 4th Round	(United States) Serena Williams [11]	(Spain) Carla Suárez Navarro [30]	6−2, 6−2
Ladies' Singles 4th Round	(Romania) Simona Halep [7]	(United States) Cori Gauff [Q]	6–3, 6–3
Gentlemen's Singles 4th Round	(Serbia) Novak Djokovic [1]	(France) Ugo Humbert	6–3, 6–2, 6–3
Mixed Doubles 2nd Round	(Croatia) Franko Škugor [12] (Romania) Raluca Olaru [12]	(United States) Frances Tiafoe (United States) Venus Williams	6−3, 6−1
Matches on No. 2 Court
Event	Winner	Loser	Score
Ladies' Singles 4th Round	(United States) Alison Riske	(Australia) Ashleigh Barty [1]	3−6, 6−2, 6−3
Ladies' Singles 4th Round	(Czech Republic) Karolína Muchová	(Czech Republic) Karolína Plíšková [3]	4−6, 7–5, 13−11
Gentlemen's Singles 4th Round	(Japan) Kei Nishikori [8]	(Kazakhstan) Mikhail Kukushkin	6−3, 3−6, 6−3, 6−4
Matches on No. 3 Court
Event	Winner	Loser	Score
Ladies' Singles 4th Round	(Ukraine) Elina Svitolina [8]	(Croatia) Petra Martić [24]	6–4, 6–2
Gentlemen's Singles 4th Round	(Belgium) David Goffin [21]	(Spain) Fernando Verdasco	7−6^{(11−9)}, 2−6, 6−3, 6−4
Gentlemen's Singles 4th Round	(Argentina) Guido Pella [26]	(Canada) Milos Raonic [15]	3−6, 4−6, 6−3, 7−6^{(7−3)}, 8−6

== Day 8 (9 July) ==
- Seeds out:
  - Ladies' Singles: (United Kingdom) Johanna Konta [19]
  - Gentlemen's Doubles: (Poland) Łukasz Kubot / (Brazil) Marcelo Melo [1], (Netherlands) Jean-Julien Rojer / (Romania) Horia Tecău [5], (United States) Rajeev Ram / (United Kingdom) Joe Salisbury [12]
  - Ladies' Doubles: (United States) Nicole Melichar / (Czech Republic) Květa Peschke [7], (Chinese Taipei) Chan Hao-ching / (Chinese Taipei) Latisha Chan [9], (Romania) Irina-Camelia Begu / (Romania) Monica Niculescu [15]
  - Mixed Doubles: (Croatia) Nikola Mektić / (Poland) Alicja Rosolska [6], (France) Fabrice Martin / (United States) Raquel Atawo [14]
- Schedule of play

Matches on main courts
Matches on Centre Court
Event	Winner	Loser	Score
Ladies' Singles Quarterfinals	(United States) Serena Williams [11]	(United States) Alison Riske	6–4, 4–6, 6–3
Ladies' Singles Quarterfinals	(Czech Republic) Barbora Strýcová	(United Kingdom) Johanna Konta [19]	7–6^{(7–5)}, 6–1
Mixed Doubles 2nd Round	(United Kingdom) Andy Murray (United States) Serena Williams	(France) Fabrice Martin [14] (United States) Raquel Atawo [14]	7–5, 6–3
Matches on No. 1 Court
Event	Winner	Loser	Score
Ladies' Singles Quarterfinals	(Romania) Simona Halep [7]	(China) Zhang Shuai	7–6^{(7–4)}, 6–1
Ladies' Singles Quarterfinals	(Ukraine) Elina Svitolina [8]	(Czech Republic) Karolína Muchová	7–5, 6–4
Gentlemen's Doubles Quarterfinals	(France) Nicolas Mahut [11] (France) Édouard Roger-Vasselin [11]	(Poland) Łukasz Kubot [1] (Brazil) Marcelo Melo [1]	7–6^{(7–3)}, 6–7^{(7–5)}, 6–3, 6–3
Matches on No. 2 Court
Event	Winner	Loser	Score
Mixed Doubles 3rd Round	(United Kingdom) Evan Hoyt [WC] (United Kingdom) Eden Silva [WC]	(Belgium) Joran Vliegen (China) Zheng Saisai	5−7, 7−6^{(7−5)}, 6−4
Ladies' Doubles 3rd Round	(Hungary) Tímea Babos [1] (France) Kristina Mladenovic [1]	(United States) Nicole Melichar [7] (Czech Republic) Květa Peschke [7]	2−6, 6−2, 9−7
Gentlemen's Doubles Quarterfinals	(Colombia) Juan Sebastián Cabal [2] (Colombia) Robert Farah [2]	(Netherlands) Jean-Julien Rojer [5] (Romania) Horia Tecău [5]	6−4, 3−6, 6–7^{(8–10)}, 6−4, 11−9
Matches on No. 3 Court
Event	Winner	Loser	Score
Senior Gentlemen's Invitational Doubles Round Robin	(Netherlands) Jacco Eltingh (Netherlands) Paul Haarhuis	(France) Henri Leconte (United States) Patrick McEnroe	6−3, 7−5
Ladies' Doubles 3rd Round	(Belgium) Elise Mertens [6] (Belarus) Aryna Sabalenka [6]	(Chinese Taipei) Chan Hao-ching [9] (Chinese Taipei) Latisha Chan [9]	7−5, 6−3
Mixed Doubles 3rd Round	(Croatia) Franko Škugor [12] (Romania) Raluca Olaru [12]	(Croatia) Nikola Mektić [6] (Poland) Alicja Rosolska [6]	6−2, 6−2
Senior Gentlemen's Invitational Doubles Round Robin	(Sweden) Jonas Björkman (Australia) Todd Woodbridge	(United Kingdom) Jeremy Bates (United Kingdom) Andrew Castle	6−4, 6−2
Ladies' Invitational Doubles Round Robin	(Zimbabwe) Cara Black (United States) Martina Navratilova	(United Kingdom) Anne Keothavong (Spain) Arantxa Sánchez Vicario	6−3, 6−2

== Day 9 (10 July) ==
- Seeds out:
  - Gentlemen's Singles: (Japan) Kei Nishikori [8], (Belgium) David Goffin [21], (Argentina) Guido Pella [26]
  - Gentlemen's Doubles: (Finland) Henri Kontinen / (Australia) John Peers [8]
  - Ladies' Doubles: (Belgium) Elise Mertens / (Belarus) Aryna Sabalenka [6], (Germany) Anna-Lena Grönefeld / (Netherlands) Demi Schuurs [8]
  - Mixed Doubles: (Croatia) Mate Pavić / (Canada) Gabriela Dabrowski [3], (Australia) John Peers / (China) Zhang Shuai [4], (France) Édouard Roger-Vasselin / (Slovenia) Andreja Klepač [11]
- Schedule of play

Matches on main courts
Matches on Centre Court
Event	Winner	Loser	Score
Gentlemen's Singles Quarterfinals	(Serbia) Novak Djokovic [1]	(Belgium) David Goffin [21]	6−4, 6−0, 6−2
Gentlemen's Singles Quarterfinals	(Switzerland) Roger Federer [2]	(Japan) Kei Nishikori [8]	4−6, 6−1, 6−4, 6−4
Ladies' Invitational Doubles Round Robin	(Zimbabwe) Cara Black (United States) Martina Navratilova	(United States) Mary Joe Fernández (Japan) Ai Sugiyama	6−3, 6−3
Matches on No. 1 Court
Event	Winner	Loser	Score
Gentlemen's Singles Quarterfinals	(Spain) Roberto Bautista Agut [23]	(Argentina) Guido Pella [26]	7−5, 6−4, 3−6, 6−3
Gentlemen's Singles Quarterfinals	(Spain) Rafael Nadal [3]	(United States) Sam Querrey	7−5, 6−2, 6−2
Gentlemen's Invitational Doubles Round Robin	(Sweden) Thomas Enqvist (Sweden) Thomas Johansson	(United Kingdom) Jamie Delgado (United Kingdom) Jonathan Marray	2−6, 7−6^{(9−7)}, [10−8]
Matches on No. 2 Court
Event	Winner	Loser	Score
Ladies' Doubles Quarterfinals	(Czech Republic) Barbora Krejčíková [2] (Czech Republic) Kateřina Siniaková [2]	(Germany) Anna-Lena Grönefeld [8] (Netherlands) Demi Schuurs [8]	6−2, 7−6^{(7−1)}
Ladies' Doubles Quarterfinals	(Chinese Taipei) Hsieh Su-wei [3] (Czech Republic) Barbora Strýcová [3]	(Belgium) Elise Mertens [6] (Belarus) Aryna Sabalenka [6]	6−4, 6−2
Mixed Doubles 3rd Round	(Brazil) Bruno Soares [1] (United States) Nicole Melichar [1]	(United Kingdom) Andy Murray (United States) Serena Williams	6−3, 4−6, 6−2
Gentlemen's Invitational Doubles Round Robin	(Belgium) Xavier Malisse (Belarus) Max Mirnyi	(Croatia) Mario Ančić (Zimbabwe) Wayne Black	6−3, 6−4
Matches on No. 3 Court
Event	Winner	Loser	Score
Gentlemen's Invitational Doubles Round Robin	(France) Arnaud Clément (France) Michaël Llodra	(Chile) Fernando González (France) Sébastien Grosjean	6−3, 3−6, [11−9]
Gentlemen's Doubles Quarterfinals	(South Africa) Raven Klaasen [3] (New Zealand) Michael Venus [3]	(Finland) Henri Kontinen [8] (Australia) John Peers [8]	4−6, 6−3, 6−7^{(5−7)}, 6−4, 6−3
Mixed Doubles 3rd Round	(Croatia) Ivan Dodig [8] (Chinese Taipei) Latisha Chan [8]	(France) Édouard Roger-Vasselin [11] (Slovenia) Andreja Klepač [11]	2−6, 6−3, 6−4
Mixed Doubles 3rd Round	(Sweden) Robert Lindstedt (Latvia) Jeļena Ostapenko	(Australia) John Peers [4] (China) Zhang Shuai [4]	2−6, 7−5, 6−4

== Day 10 (11 July) ==
- Seeds out:
  - Ladies' Singles: (Ukraine) Elina Svitolina [8]
  - Gentlemen's Doubles: (South Africa) Raven Klaasen / (New Zealand) Michael Venus [3]
  - Mixed Doubles: (Brazil) Bruno Soares / (United States) Nicole Melichar [1], (Croatia) Franko Škugor / (Romania) Raluca Olaru [12]
- Schedule of play

Matches on main courts
Matches on Centre Court
Event	Winner	Loser	Score
Ladies' Singles Semifinals	(Romania) Simona Halep [7]	(Ukraine) Elina Svitolina [8]	6–1, 6–3
Ladies' Singles Semifinals	(United States) Serena Williams [11]	(Czech Republic) Barbora Strýcová	6–1, 6–2
Gentlemen's Doubles Semifinals	(Colombia) Juan Sebastián Cabal [2] (Colombia) Robert Farah [2]	(South Africa) Raven Klaasen [3] (New Zealand) Michael Venus [3]	6−4, 6−7^{(4−7)}, 7−6^{(7−2)}, 6−4
Matches on No. 1 Court
Event	Winner	Loser	Score
Gentlemen's Doubles Semifinals	(France) Nicolas Mahut [11] (France) Édouard Roger-Vasselin [11]	(Croatia) Ivan Dodig (Slovakia) Filip Polášek	6–2, 7–6^{(9–7)}, 7–6^{(7–2)}
Mixed Doubles Quarterfinals	(Netherlands) Matwé Middelkoop (China) Yang Zhaoxuan	(Brazil) Bruno Soares [1] (United States) Nicole Melichar [1]	6−4, 6−3
Mixed Doubles Quarterfinals	(Sweden) Robert Lindstedt (Latvia) Jeļena Ostapenko	(Croatia) Franko Škugor [12] (Romania) Raluca Olaru [12]	6−7^{(6−8)}, 6−3, 7−5
Matches on No. 2 Court
Event	Winner	Loser	Score
Senior Gentlemen's Invitational Doubles Round Robin	(South Africa) Wayne Ferreira (Australia) Mark Woodforde	(United Kingdom) Jeremy Bates (United Kingdom) Andrew Castle	7–5, 7–6^{(7–3)}
Ladies' Invitational Doubles Round Robin	(Croatia) Iva Majoli (Bulgaria) Magdalena Maleeva	(United Kingdom) Anne Keothavong (Spain) Arantxa Sánchez Vicario	6–4, 6–4
Mixed Doubles Quarterfinals	(Netherlands) Wesley Koolhof [5] (Czech Republic) Květa Peschke [5]	(New Zealand) Artem Sitak (Germany) Laura Siegemund	6–1, 6–2
Senior Gentlemen's Invitational Doubles Round Robin	(Sweden) Jonas Björkman (Australia) Todd Woodbridge	(France) Mansour Bahrami (United Kingdom) Chris Wilkinson	6−4, 6−3
Mixed Doubles Quarterfinals	(Croatia) Ivan Dodig [8] (Chinese Taipei) Latisha Chan [8]	(United Kingdom) Evan Hoyt [WC] (United Kingdom) Eden Silva [WC]	7−5, 7−6^{(7−5)}
Matches on No. 3 Court
Event	Winner	Loser	Score
Boys' Singles Quarterfinals	(Japan) Shintaro Mochizuki [8]	(United Kingdom) Anton Matusevich	6–3, 6–3
Girls' Singles Quarterfinals	(United States) Emma Navarro [1]	(Japan) Natsumi Kawaguchi [6]	4−6, 6−1, 6−1
Boys' Doubles 2nd Round	(Japan) Shintaro Mochizuki [2] (Norway) Holger Rune [2]	(Spain) Nicolás Álvarez Varona (Argentina) Juan Bautista Torres	2–6, 7–5, 6–2
Girls' Doubles 2nd Round	(Russia) Polina Kudermetova (France) Giulia Morlet	(Japan) Natsumi Kawaguchi [3] (Hungary) Adrienn Nagy [3]	4−6, 6−4, 7−5
Senior Gentlemen's Invitational Doubles Round Robin	(United Kingdom) Greg Rusedski (France) Fabrice Santoro	(France) Henri Leconte (United States) Patrick McEnroe	6−4, 6−2

== Day 11 (12 July) ==
- Seeds out:
  - Gentlemen's Singles: (Spain) Rafael Nadal [3], (Spain) Roberto Bautista Agut [23]
  - Ladies' Doubles: (Hungary) Tímea Babos / (France) Kristina Mladenovic [1], (Czech Republic) Barbora Krejčíková / (Czech Republic) Kateřina Siniaková [2]
  - Mixed Doubles: (Netherlands) Wesley Koolhof / (Czech Republic) Květa Peschke [5]
- Schedule of play

Matches on main courts
Matches on Centre Court
Event	Winner	Loser	Score
Gentlemen's Singles Semifinals	(Serbia) Novak Djokovic [1]	(Spain) Roberto Bautista Agut [23]	6−2, 4−6, 6−3, 6−2
Gentlemen's Singles Semifinals	(Switzerland) Roger Federer [2]	(Spain) Rafael Nadal [3]	7−6^{(7−3)}, 1−6, 6−3, 6−4
Matches on No. 1 Court
Event	Winner	Loser	Score
Ladies' Doubles Semifinals	(Canada) Gabriela Dabrowski [4] (China) Xu Yifan [4]	(Czech Republic) Barbora Krejčíková [2] (Czech Republic) Kateřina Siniaková [2]	6−1, 3−6, 6−3
Ladies' Doubles Semifinals	(Chinese Taipei) Hsieh Su-wei (Czech Republic) Barbora Strýcová [3]	(Hungary) Tímea Babos (France) Kristina Mladenovic [1]	7−6^{(7−5)}, 6−4
Mixed Doubles Semifinals	(Sweden) Robert Lindstedt (Latvia) Jeļena Ostapenko	(Netherlands) Matwé Middelkoop (China) Yang Zhaoxuan	7−5, 6−2
Gentlemen's Invitational Doubles Round Robin	(United Kingdom) Colin Fleming (United Kingdom) Ross Hutchins	(Chile) Fernando González (France) Sébastien Grosjean	7−5, 6−4
Matches on No. 3 Court
Event	Winner	Loser	Score
Gentlemen's Invitational Doubles Round Robin	(Belgium) Xavier Malisse (Belarus) Max Mirnyi	(United Kingdom) Jamie Delgado (United Kingdom) Jonathan Marray	7−6^{(7−5)}, 6−2
Senior Gentlemen's Invitational Doubles Round Robin	(Netherlands) Jacco Eltingh (Netherlands) Paul Haarhuis	(United Kingdom) Greg Rusedski (France) Fabrice Santoro	3−6, 1−1, retired
Ladies' Invitational Doubles Round Robin	(Zimbabwe) Cara Black (United States) Martina Navratilova	(Croatia) Iva Majoli (Bulgaria) Magdalena Maleeva	6−3, 6−4
Mixed Doubles Semifinals	(Croatia) Ivan Dodig [8] (Chinese Taipei) Latisha Chan [8]	(Netherlands) Wesley Koolhof [5] (Czech Republic) Květa Peschke [5]	7−5, 6−4

== Day 12 (13 July) ==
- Seeds out:
  - Ladies' Singles: (United States) Serena Williams [11]
  - Gentlemen's Doubles: (France) Nicolas Mahut / (France) Édouard Roger-Vasselin [11]
- Schedule of play

Matches on main courts
Matches on Centre Court
Event	Winner	Loser	Score
Ladies' Singles Final	(Romania) Simona Halep [7]	(United States) Serena Williams [11]	6−2, 6−2
Gentlemen's Doubles Final	(Colombia) Juan Sebastián Cabal (Colombia) Robert Farah [2]	(France) Nicolas Mahut (France) Édouard Roger-Vasselin [11]	6−7^{(5−7)}, 7−6^{(7−5)}, 7−6^{(8−6)}, 6−7^{(5−7)}, 6−3
Matches on No. 1 Court
Event	Winner	Loser	Score
Girls' Singles Final	(Ukraine) Daria Snigur	(United States) Alexa Noel [10]	6−4, 6−4
Senior Gentlemen's Invitational Doubles Round Robin	(United Kingdom) Jeremy Bates (United Kingdom) Andrew Castle	(France) Mansour Bahrami (United Kingdom) Chris Wilkinson	6−4, 3−6, [10−4]
Gentlemen's Invitational Doubles Round Robin	(France) Arnaud Clément (France) Michaël Llodra	(Germany) Tommy Haas (Australia) Mark Philippoussis	6−3, 6−4
Senior Gentlemen's Invitational Doubles Round Robin	(Sweden) Jonas Björkman (Australia) Todd Woodbridge	(South Africa) Wayne Ferreira (Australia) Mark Woodforde	6−3, 6−3
Matches on No. 3 Court
Event	Winner	Loser	Score
Wheelchair Men's Doubles Final	(Belgium) Joachim Gérard [2] (Sweden) Stefan Olsson [2]	(United Kingdom) Alfie Hewett (United Kingdom) Gordon Reid	6–4, 6–2
Wheelchair Women's Singles Final	(Netherlands) Aniek van Koot	(Netherlands) Diede de Groot [1]	6−4, 4−6, 7−5
Gentlemen's Invitational Doubles Round Robin	(Croatia) Mario Ančić (Zimbabwe) Wayne Black	(Sweden) Thomas Enqvist (Sweden) Thomas Johansson	7−6^{(8−6)}, 7−5

== Day 13 (14 July) ==
- Seeds out:
  - Gentlemen's Singles: (Switzerland) Roger Federer [2]
  - Ladies' Doubles: (Canada) Gabriela Dabrowski / (China) Xu Yifan [4]
- Schedule of play

Matches on main courts
Matches on Centre Court
Event	Winner	Loser	Score
Gentlemen's Singles Final	(Serbia) Novak Djokovic [1]	(Switzerland) Roger Federer [2]	7–6^{(7–5)}, 1–6, 7–6^{(7–4)}, 4–6, 13–12^{(7–3)}
Ladies' Doubles Final	(Chinese Taipei) Hsieh Su-wei [3] (Czech Republic) Barbora Strýcová [3]	(Canada) Gabriela Dabrowski [4] (China) Xu Yifan [4]	6−2, 6−4
Matches on No. 1 Court
Event	Winner	Loser	Score
Boys' Singles Finals	(Japan) Shintaro Mochizuki [8]	(Spain) Carlos Gimeno Valero	6–3, 6–2
Mixed Doubles Final	(Croatia) Ivan Dodig [8] (Chinese Taipei) Latisha Chan [8]	(Sweden) Robert Lindstedt (Latvia) Jeļena Ostapenko	6–2, 6–3
Ladies' Invitational Doubles Final	(Zimbabwe) Cara Black (United States) Martina Navratilova	(France) Marion Bartoli (Slovakia) Daniela Hantuchová	6–0, 3–6, [10–8]
Matches on No. 3 Court
Event	Winner	Loser	Score
Wheelchair Women's Doubles Final	(Netherlands) Diede de Groot [1] (Netherlands) Aniek van Koot [1]	(Netherlands) Marjolein Buis [2] (Italy) Giulia Capocci [2]	6−1, 6−1
Wheelchair Men's Singles Final	(Argentina) Gustavo Fernández [2]	(Japan) Shingo Kunieda [1]	4–6, 6–3, 6–2
