= 2019 Wimbledon Championships – Boys' singles =

Boys' singles
- 2019 Wimbledon Championships

Final
- Champion: (Japan) Shintaro Mochizuki
- Runner-up: (Spain) Carlos Gimeno Valero
- Score: 6–3, 6–2

Events
Singles	men	women		boys	girls
Doubles	men	women	mixed	boys	girls
WC Singles	men	women	quad
WC Doubles	men	women	quad
Legends	men	women	seniors
← 2018 ·	Wimbledon Championships	· 2021 →

Shintaro Mochizuki won the title, defeating Carlos Gimeno Valero in the final, 6–3, 6–2. He saved a match point in the semifinals against Martin Damm.

Tseng Chun-hsin was the defending champion, but chose not to compete in the junior event. He received a wildcard into the men's singles qualifying competition, where he lost to Tommy Paul in the first round. Future Wimbledon champion Carlos Alcaraz participated in this tournament, losing to Damm in the quarterfinals.

== Seeds ==
1. (Denmark) Holger Rune (third round)
2. (Czech Republic) Jonáš Forejtek (first round)
3. (Argentina) Thiago Agustín Tirante (first round)
4. (United States) Martin Damm (semifinals)
5. (Czech Republic) Jiří Lehečka (second round)
6. (United States) Brandon Nakashima (third round)
7. (United States) Toby Kodat (first round)
8. (Japan) Shintaro Mochizuki (champion)
9. (China) Bu Yunchaokete (withdrew)

10. (Spain) Carlos Alcaraz (quarterfinals)
11. (Finland) Otto Virtanen (first round)
12. (Canada) Liam Draxl (second round)
13. (Romania) Filip Cristian Jianu (third round)
14. (Japan) Shunsuke Mitsui (second round)
15. (Belgium) Gauthier Onclin (first round)
16. (Japan) Keisuke Saitoh (first round)
17. (France) Harold Mayot (semifinals)

Click on the seed number of a player to go to their draw section.

== Draw ==
Key

- Q = Qualifier
- WC = Wild card
- LL = Lucky loser
- Alt = Alternate
- ITF = ITF entry
- PR = Protected ranking
- SR = Special ranking
- SE = Special exempt
- JE = Junior exempt
- JR = Junior Accelerator Programme entrant
- CO = College Accelerator Programme entrant
- NG = Next Gen Accelerator Program entrant
- w/o = Walkover
- r = Retired
- d = Defaulted

=== Finals ===
Quarterfinals
(United Kingdom) Anton Matusevich	3	3
8	(Japan) Shintaro Mochizuki	6	6
4	(United States) Martin Damm	6	6
10	(Spain) Carlos Alcaraz	1	4
(Czech Republic) Dalibor Svrčina	6	3	5
(Spain) Carlos Gimeno Valero	4	6	7
17	(France) Harold Mayot	6	6
(Ukraine) Illya Beloborodko	4	4

Semifinals
8	(Japan) Shintaro Mochizuki	6	0	10
4	(United States) Martin Damm	1	6	8
(Spain) Carlos Gimeno Valero	7^{7}	6
17	(France) Harold Mayot	6^{5}	4

Final
8	(Japan) Shintaro Mochizuki	6	6
(Spain) Carlos Gimeno Valero	3	2

=== Top half ===
==== Section 1 ====
First round
1	(Denmark) Holger Vitus Nødskov Rune	6	6
(Sweden) Kevin Chahoud	2	4
(Ukraine) Eric Vanshelboim	6	3	6
(Switzerland) Leandro Riedi	3	6	3
(Australia) Rinky Hijikata	2	5
(United States) Govind Nanda	6	7
(United Kingdom) Anton Matusevich	6	4	6
15	(Belgium) Gauthier Onclin	3	6	4
11	(Finland) Otto Virtanen	6	1	5
(United States) Cannon Kingsley	4	6	7
(Italy) Matteo Arnaldi	6^{4}	1
WC	(United Kingdom) Arthur Fery	7^{7}	6
(Spain) Pablo Llamas Ruiz	4	6	2
Q	(Argentina) Román Andrés Burruchaga	6	4	6
(France) Valentin Royer	6	3	6
8	(Japan) Shintaro Mochizuki	3	6	8

Second round
1	(Denmark) HVN Rune	6	6
(Ukraine) E Vanshelboim	0	2
(United States) G Nanda	3	3
(United Kingdom) A Matusevich	6	6
(United States) C Kingsley	4	4
WC	(United Kingdom) A Fery	6	6
(Argentina) RA Burruchaga	5	6^{3}
8	(Japan) S Mochizuki	7	7^{7}

Third round
1	(Denmark) HVN Rune	4	5
(United Kingdom) A Matusevich	6	7
WC	(United Kingdom) A Fery	3	3
8	(Japan) S Mochizuki	6	6

Quarterfinals
(United Kingdom) A Matusevich	3	3
8	(Japan) S Mochizuki	6	6

==== Section 2 ====
First round
4	(United States) Martin Damm	6	6^{6}	6
(Italy) Francesco Passaro	2	7^{8}	4
Q	(Japan) Ryoma Matsushita	2	6	6
WC	(United Kingdom) Blu Baker	6	1	4
(Algeria) Youcef Rihane	2	2
(Canada) Taha Baadi	6	6
Q	(France) Baptiste Anselmo	6	6^{2}	8
16	(Japan) Keisuke Saitoh	2	7^{7}	6
10	(Spain) Carlos Alcaraz	6	6
(United States) Tyler Zink	3	2
(Brazil) Matheus Pucinelli de Almeida	6	6
(Argentina) Alejo Lorenzo Lingua Lavallén	4	4
LL	(United States) William Grant	6	4	7
(Romania) Nini Gabriel Dica	1	6	5
WC	(United Kingdom) Harry Wendelken	2	3
5	(Czech Republic) Jiří Lehečka	6	6

Second round
4	(United States) M Damm	6	6
Q	(Japan) R Matsushita	4	4
(Canada) T Baadi	6	7^{7}
Q	(France) B Anselmo	4	6^{3}
10	(Spain) C Alcaraz	6	6
(Brazil) M Pucinelli de Almeida	1	2
LL	(United States) W Grant	6	7^{8}
5	(Czech Republic) J Lehečka	4	6^{6}

Third round
4	(United States) M Damm	6	6
(Canada) T Baadi	2	3
10	(Spain) C Alcaraz	6	5	8
LL	(United States) W Grant	4	7	6

Quarterfinals
4	(United States) M Damm	6	6
10	(Spain) C Alcaraz	1	4

=== Bottom half ===
==== Section 3 ====
First round
7	(United States) Toby Kodat	0	5
(Australia) Tristan Schoolkate	6	7
Q	(United States) Andres Martin	5	0
(Switzerland) Dominic Stricker	7	6
(Czech Republic) Dalibor Svrčina	6	6
(Poland) Wojciech Marek	1	3
WC	(United Kingdom) Jack Pinnington Jones	3	3
12	(Canada) Liam Draxl	6	6
13	(Romania) Filip Cristian Jianu	7	7^{7}
WC	(United Kingdom) Toby Samuel	5	6^{2}
(Italy) Flavio Cobolli	6	6
(Uzbekistan) Sergey Fomin	2	1
Q	(United Kingdom) Derrick Chen	6^{7}	4
Q	(United States) Andrew Dale	7^{9}	6
(Spain) Carlos Gimeno Valero	6^{5}	6	6
3	(Argentina) Thiago Agustín Tirante	7^{7}	3	4

Second round
(Australia) T Schoolkate	6	6
(Switzerland) D Stricker	3	4
(Czech Republic) D Svrčina	7^{7}	3	6
12	(Canada) L Draxl	6^{3}	6	3
13	(Romania) FC Jianu	7^{9}	6
(Italy) F Cobolli	6^{7}	2
Q	(United States) A Dale	1	3
(Spain) C Gimeno Valero	6	6

Third round
(Australia) T Schoolkate	4	2
(Czech Republic) D Svrčina	6	6
13	(Romania) FC Jianu	7^{7}	3	2
(Spain) C Gimeno Valero	6^{2}	6	6

Quarterfinals
(Czech Republic) D Svrčina	6	3	5
(Spain) C Gimeno Valero	4	6	7

==== Section 4 ====
First round
6	(United States) Brandon Nakashima	6	7^{7}
Q	(Vietnam) Nguyễn Văn Phương	0	6^{5}
(Romania) Nicholas David Ionel	6	6
WC	(United Kingdom) Jacob Fearnley	3	2
Q	(Brazil) Natan Rodrigues	6	7^{10}
(Hungary) Péter Makk	4	6^{8}
(Australia) Dane Sweeny	4	4
17	(France) Harold Mayot	6	6
14	(Japan) Shunsuke Mitsui	6^{3}	6	6
(Argentina) Juan Bautista Torres	7^{7}	2	3
(Spain) Nicolás Álvarez Varona	6	6
WC	(United Kingdom) Felix Gill	4	4
(Ukraine) Illya Beloborodko	1	7	6
(United States) Eliot Spizzirri	6	5	4
WC	(United Kingdom) James Story	6	7^{7}
2	(Czech Republic) Jonáš Forejtek	4	6^{3}

Second round
6	(United States) B Nakashima	7^{7}	6
(Romania) ND Ionel	6^{4}	2
Q	(Brazil) N Rodrigues	5	4
17	(France) H Mayot	7	6
14	(Japan) S Mitsui	2	3
(Spain) N Álvarez Varona	6	6
(Ukraine) I Beloborodko	6	5	6
WC	(United Kingdom) J Story	4	7	4

Third round
6	(United States) B Nakashima	4	4
17	(France) H Mayot	6	6
(Spain) N Álvarez Varona	6^{3}	4
(Ukraine) I Beloborodko	7^{7}	6

Quarterfinals
17	(France) H Mayot	6	6
(Ukraine) I Beloborodko	4	4

== Qualifying ==
=== Seeds ===
1. (Poland) Wojciech Marek (moved to main draw)
2. (Czech Republic) Dalibor Svrčina (moved to main draw)
3. (Netherlands) Stijn Pel (first round)
4. (Belarus) Alexander Zgirovsky (first round)
5. (Vietnam) Nguyễn Văn Phương (qualified)
6. (Czech Republic) Andrew Paulson (qualifying competition)
7. (United States) Dali Blanch (qualifying competition)
8. (Brazil) Natan Rodrigues (qualified)
9. (Argentina) Román Andrés Burruchaga (qualified)
10. (Ivory Coast) Eliakim Coulibaly (qualifying competition)
11. (United States) William Grant (qualifying competition; lucky loser)
12. (France) Baptiste Anselmo (qualified)
13. (Thailand) Thantub Suksumrarn (first round)
14. (Russia) Egor Agafonov (first round)
15. (France) Loris Pourroy (qualifying competition)
16. (United States) Andres Martin (qualified)

=== Qualifiers ===
1. (Japan) Ryoma Matsushita
2. (United States) Andrew Dale
3. (France) Baptiste Anselmo
4. (United Kingdom) Derrick Chen
5. (Vietnam) Nguyễn Văn Phương
6. (United States) Andres Martin
7. (Argentina) Román Andrés Burruchaga
8. (Brazil) Natan Rodrigues

=== Lucky loser ===
1. (United States) William Grant

=== Draw ===
==== First qualifier ====
First round
Alt	(United Kingdom) William Nolan	6^{3}	4
(Japan) Ryoma Matsushita	7^{7}	6
(France) Martin Breysach	1	6	3
10	(Ivory Coast) Eliakim Coulibaly	6	3	6

Qualifying competition
(Japan) Ryoma Matsushita	6	6
10	(Ivory Coast) Eliakim Coulibaly	3	3

==== Second qualifier ====
First round
Alt	(United Kingdom) Alexander Maggs	3	2
(United States) Andrew Dale	6	6
WC	(United Kingdom) Connor Thomson	3	6	6
14	(Russia) Egor Agafonov	6	1	1

Qualifying competition
(United States) Andrew Dale	6	6
WC	(United Kingdom) Connor Thomson	3	3

==== Third qualifier ====
First round
3	(Netherlands) Stijn Pel	4	5
(United Kingdom) Oscar Weightman	6	7
(United States) Blaise Bicknell	3	1
12	(France) Baptiste Anselmo	6	6

Qualifying competition
(United Kingdom) Oscar Weightman	4	0
12	(France) Baptiste Anselmo	6	6

==== Fourth qualifier ====
First round
4	(Belarus) Alexander Zgirovsky	6	0	3
(Romania) Cezar Crețu	2	6	6
WC	(United Kingdom) Derrick Chen	4	6	6
13	(Thailand) Thantub Suksumrarn	6	1	4

Qualifying competition
(Romania) Cezar Crețu	6^{5}	6	4
WC	(United Kingdom) Derrick Chen	7^{7}	4	6

==== Fifth qualifier ====
First round
5	(Vietnam) Nguyễn Văn Phương	7	5	6
WC	(United Kingdom) Finn Murgett	5	7	4
WC	(Sweden) Leo Borg	1	4
15	(France) Loris Pourroy	6	6

Qualifying competition
5	(Vietnam) Nguyễn Văn Phương	6	6
15	(France) Loris Pourroy	3	2

==== Sixth qualifier ====
First round
6	(Czech Republic) Andrew Paulson	7^{7}	4	6
(Australia) Stefan Storch	6^{3}	6	3
WC	(United Kingdom) Peter Alam	0	4
16	(United States) Andres Martin	6	6

Qualifying competition
6	(Czech Republic) Andrew Paulson	3	2
16	(United States) Andres Martin	6	6

==== Seventh qualifier ====
First round
7	(United States) Dali Blanch	6	6
(Netherlands) Christian Lerby	1	3
WC	(United Kingdom) Joseph White	0	4
9	(Argentina) Román Andrés Burruchaga	6	6

Qualifying competition
7	(United States) Dali Blanch	3	2
9	(Argentina) Román Andrés Burruchaga	6	6

==== Eighth qualifier ====
First round
8	(Brazil) Natan Rodrigues	6	6
(South Africa) Joubert Klopper	1	4
(United Kingdom) Lui Maxted	6^{3}	2
11	(United States) William Grant	7^{7}	6

Qualifying competition
8	(Brazil) Natan Rodrigues	2	6	6
11	(United States) William Grant	6	3	1
