= 2019 Wimbledon Championships – Wheelchair quad singles =

Wheelchair quad singles
- 2019 Wimbledon Championships

Final
- Champion: (Australia) Dylan Alcott
- Runner-up: (United Kingdom) Andrew Lapthorne
- Score: 6−0, 6−2

Events
Singles	men	women		boys	girls
Doubles	men	women	mixed	boys	girls
WC Singles	men	women	quad
WC Doubles	men	women	quad
Legends	men	women	seniors
- Wimbledon Championships

Dylan Alcott defeated Andrew Lapthorne in the final, 6−0, 6−2 to win the inaugural quad singles wheelchair tennis title at the 2019 Wimbledon Championships. With the win, Alcott completed a non-calendar-year Grand Slam and the career Super Slam.

== Seeds ==
1. (Australia) Dylan Alcott (champion)
2. (United States) David Wagner (semifinals, Third place)

== Draw ==
Key

- Q = Qualifier
- WC = Wild card
- LL = Lucky loser
- Alt = Alternate
- ITF = ITF entry
- PR = Protected ranking
- SR = Special ranking
- SE = Special exempt
- JE = Junior exempt
- JR = Junior Accelerator Programme entrant
- CO = College Accelerator Programme entrant
- NG = Next Gen Accelerator Program entrant
- w/o = Walkover
- r = Retired
- d = Defaulted

=== Finals ===
Semifinals
1	(Australia) Dylan Alcott	6	6
(Japan) Koji Sugeno	3	4
WC	(United Kingdom) Andrew Lapthorne	7	6
2	(United States) David Wagner	5	4

Final
1	(Australia) Dylan Alcott	6	6
WC	(United Kingdom) Andrew Lapthorne	0	2
Third place match
(Japan) Koji Sugeno	2	5
2	(United States) David Wagner	6	7
