= 2019 Wimbledon Championships – Boys' doubles =

Boys' doubles
- 2019 Wimbledon Championships

Final
- Champions: (Czech Republic) Jonáš Forejtek (Czech Republic) Jiří Lehečka
- Runners-up: (Canada) Liam Draxl (United States) Govind Nanda
- Score: 7−5, 6−4

Events
Singles	men	women		boys	girls
Doubles	men	women	mixed	boys	girls
WC Singles	men	women	quad
WC Doubles	men	women	quad
Legends	men	women	seniors
← 2018 ·	Wimbledon Championships	· 2020 →

Yankı Erel and Otto Virtanen were the defending champions, but Erel was no longer eligible to participate in junior events. Virtanen was scheduled to partner Rinky Hijikata, but the pair withdrew before the tournament began.

Jonáš Forejtek and Jiří Lehečka won the title, defeating Liam Draxl and Govind Nanda in the final, 7−5, 6−4.

== Seeds ==
1. (Czech Republic) Jonáš Forejtek / (Czech Republic) Jiří Lehečka (champions)
2. (Japan) Shintaro Mochizuki / (Denmark) Holger Vitus Nødskov Rune (quarterfinals)
3. (United States) Martin Damm / (United States) Toby Kodat (semifinals)
4. (Brazil) Matheus Pucinelli de Almeida / (Argentina) Thiago Agustín Tirante (first round)
5. (Australia) Rinky Hijikata / (Finland) Otto Virtanen (withdrew)
6. (Japan) Shunsuke Mitsui / (Japan) Keisuke Saitoh (quarterfinals)
7. (Canada) Liam Draxl / (United States) Govind Nanda (final)
8. (Uzbekistan) Sergey Fomin / (Belgium) Gauthier Onclin (first round)

== Draw ==
Key

- Q = Qualifier
- WC = Wild card
- LL = Lucky loser
- Alt = Alternate
- ITF = ITF entry
- PR = Protected ranking
- SR = Special ranking
- SE = Special exempt
- JE = Junior exempt
- JR = Junior Accelerator Programme entrant
- CO = College Accelerator Programme entrant
- NG = Next Gen Accelerator Program entrant
- w/o = Walkover
- r = Retired
- d = Defaulted

=== Finals ===
Semifinals
1	(Czech Republic) Jonáš Forejtek (Czech Republic) Jiří Lehečka	6	3	6
3	(United States) Martin Damm (United States) Toby Kodat	2	6	3
WC	(United Kingdom) Arthur Fery (United Kingdom) Toby Samuel	4	3
7	(Canada) Liam Draxl (United States) Govind Nanda	6	6

Final
1	(Czech Republic) Jonáš Forejtek (Czech Republic) Jiří Lehečka	7	6
7	(Canada) Liam Draxl (United States) Govind Nanda	5	4

=== Top half ===
First round
1	(Czech Republic) Jonáš Forejtek (Czech Republic) Jiří Lehečka	6	6
(United States) Andrew Dale (United States) Andres Martin	4	4
(Italy) Matteo Arnaldi (Italy) Francesco Passaro	1	2
(Australia) Tristan Schoolkate (Australia) Dane Sweeny	6	6
(United States) Cannon Kingsley (Belarus) Alexander Zgirovsky	6	3	6
WC	(United Kingdom) James Story (United Kingdom) Oscar Weightman	2	6	3
(Romania) Nini Gabriel Dica (Algeria) Youcef Rihane	3	3
6	(Japan) Shunsuke Mitsui (Japan) Keisuke Saitoh	6	6
3	(United States) Martin Damm (United States) Toby Kodat	7^{9}	6
(Argentina) Román Andrés Burruchaga (Brazil) Natan Rodrigues	6^{7}	4
(Sweden) Kevin Chahoud (Vietnam) Nguyễn Văn Phương	1	1
(Czech Republic) Andrew Paulson (Ukraine) Eric Vanshelboim	6	6
(United States) Eliot Spizzirri (United States) Tyler Zink	7^{7}	6
(Argentina) Alejo Lorenzo Lingua Lavallén (France) Harold Mayot	6^{1}	1
WC	(United Kingdom) Jacob Fearnley (United Kingdom) Connor Thomson	6	6
8	(Uzbekistan) Sergey Fomin (Belgium) Gauthier Onclin	2	4

Second round
1	(Czech Republic) J Forejtek (Czech Republic) J Lehečka	6	6
(Australia) T Schoolkate (Australia) D Sweeny	4	2
(United States) C Kingsley (Belarus) A Zgirovsky	2	2
6	(Japan) S Mitsui (Japan) K Saitoh	6	6
3	(United States) M Damm (United States) T Kodat	6	6
(Czech Republic) A Paulson (Ukraine) E Vanshelboim	3	4
(United States) E Spizzirri (United States) T Zink	4	6	9
WC	(United Kingdom) J Fearnley (United Kingdom) C Thomson	6	3	11

Quarterfinals
1	(Czech Republic) J Forejtek (Czech Republic) J Lehečka	5	7^{8}	7
6	(Japan) S Mitsui (Japan) K Saitoh	7	6^{6}	5
3	(United States) M Damm (United States) T Kodat	6	7
WC	(United Kingdom) J Fearnley (United Kingdom) C Thomson	3	5

Semifinals
1	(Czech Republic) J Forejtek (Czech Republic) J Lehečka	6	3	6
3	(United States) M Damm (United States) T Kodat	2	6	3

=== Bottom half ===
First round
Alt	(United Kingdom) Derrick Chen (United Kingdom) Lui Maxted	4	2
WC	(United Kingdom) Arthur Fery (United Kingdom) Toby Samuel	6	6
(Canada) Taha Baadi (Romania) Filip Cristian Jianu	6	6
(Switzerland) Leandro Riedi (Czech Republic) Dalibor Svrčina	3	1
(Spain) Carlos Gimeno Valero (Spain) Pablo Llamas Ruiz	6^{7}	1
(Italy) Flavio Cobolli (Switzerland) Dominic Stricker	7^{9}	6
(United States) Brandon Nakashima (France) Valentin Royer	6	6
4	(Brazil) Matheus Pucinelli de Almeida (Argentina) Thiago Agustín Tirante	3	2
7	(Canada) Liam Draxl (United States) Govind Nanda	7^{7}	7^{7}
(Romania) Nicholas David Ionel (Poland) Wojciech Marek	6^{4}	6^{5}
(Ukraine) Illya Beloborodko (Hungary) Péter Makk	5	3
(France) Baptiste Anselmo (France) Loris Pourroy	7	6
(Ivory Coast) Eliakim Coulibaly (Japan) Ryoma Matsushita	6	6^{3}	0
(Spain) Nicolás Álvarez Varona (Argentina) Juan Bautista Torres	4	7^{7}	6
WC	(United Kingdom) Felix Gill (United Kingdom) Jack Pinnington Jones	4	6	3
2	(Japan) Shintaro Mochizuki (Denmark) Holger Vitus Nødskov Rune	6	4	6

Second round
WC	(United Kingdom) A Fery (United Kingdom) T Samuel	6	6
(Canada) T Baadi (Romania) FC Jianu	2	2
(Italy) F Cobolli (Switzerland) D Stricker	3	1
(United States) B Nakashima (France) V Royer	6	6
7	(Canada) L Draxl (United States) G Nanda	6	6
(France) B Anselmo (France) L Pourroy	4	3
(Spain) N Álvarez Varona (Argentina) JB Torres	6	5	2
2	(Japan) S Mochizuki (Denmark) HVN Rune	2	7	6

Quarterfinals
WC	(United Kingdom) A Fery (United Kingdom) T Samuel	6	6
(United States) B Nakashima (France) V Royer	3	2
7	(Canada) L Draxl (United States) G Nanda	6	7
2	(Japan) S Mochizuki (Denmark) HVN Rune	3	5

Semifinals
WC	(United Kingdom) A Fery (United Kingdom) T Samuel	4	3
7	(Canada) L Draxl (United States) G Nanda	6	6
