= 2019 Wimbledon Championships – Wheelchair quad doubles =

Wheelchair quad doubles
- 2019 Wimbledon Championships

Final
- Champions: (Australia) Dylan Alcott (United Kingdom) Andrew Lapthorne
- Runners-up: (Japan) Koji Sugeno (United States) David Wagner
- Score: 6−2, 7−6^{(7−4)}

Events
Singles	men	women		boys	girls
Doubles	men	women	mixed	boys	girls
WC Singles	men	women	quad
WC Doubles	men	women	quad
Legends	men	women	seniors
- Wimbledon Championships

Dylan Alcott and Andrew Lapthorne defeated Koji Sugeno and David Wagner in the final, 6−2, 7−6^{(7−4)} to win the inaugural quad doubles wheelchair tennis title at the 2019 Wimbledon Championships. It was the third step towards an eventual Grand Slam for Alcott.

Lapthorne and Wagner were the defending champions from when the tournament was held as an exhibition the previous year, but chose not to participate together.

== Seeds ==
1. (Australia) Dylan Alcott / (United Kingdom) Andrew Lapthorne (champion)
2. (Japan) Koji Sugeno / (United States) David Wagner (final)

== Draw ==
Key

- Q = Qualifier
- WC = Wild card
- LL = Lucky loser
- Alt = Alternate
- ITF = ITF entry
- PR = Protected ranking
- SR = Special ranking
- SE = Special exempt
- JE = Junior exempt
- JR = Junior Accelerator Programme entrant
- CO = College Accelerator Programme entrant
- NG = Next Gen Accelerator Program entrant
- w/o = Walkover
- r = Retired
- d = Defaulted

Final
1	(Australia) Dylan Alcott (United Kingdom) Andrew Lapthorne	6	7^{7}
2	(Japan) Koji Sugeno (United States) David Wagner	2	6^{4}
