= Illya Beloborodko =

Ukrainian tennis player (born 2001)

- Country (sports): Ukraine
- Born: 7 May 2001 (age 24)
- Plays: Right-handed
- Prize money: $41,184

Singles
- Career record: 0–1 (at ATP Tour level, Grand Slam level, and in Davis Cup)
- Career titles: 1 ITF
- Highest ranking: No. 652 (29 August 2022)
- Current ranking: No. 1,567 (15 December 2025)

Doubles
- Career record: 2–0 (at ATP Tour level, Grand Slam level, and in Davis Cup)
- Career titles: 10 ITF
- Highest ranking: No. 429 (17 March 2025)
- Current ranking: No. 1,381 (15 December 2025)
- Last updated on: 21 December 2025.

Illya Beloborodko, alternatively spelled as Illia Biloborodko (born 7 May 2001), is a Ukrainian tennis player.

He has a career-high ATP singles ranking of world No. 652 achieved on 29 August 2022, and a career-high ATP doubles ranking of No. 429 achieved on 17 March 2025.

Beloborodko represents Ukraine at the Davis Cup, where he has a W/L record of 2–1.
