= 2019 Wimbledon Championships – Gentlemen's invitation doubles =

Gentlemen's invitation doubles
- 2019 Wimbledon Championships

Final
- Champions: (France) Arnaud Clément (France) Michaël Llodra
- Runners-up: (Belgium) Xavier Malisse (Belarus) Max Mirnyi
- Score: 6–3, 1–6, [10–7]

Events
Singles	men	women		boys	girls
Doubles	men	women	mixed	boys	girls
WC Singles	men	women	quad
WC Doubles	men	women	quad
Legends	men	women	seniors
← 2018 ·	Wimbledon Championships	· 2022 →

Tommy Haas and Mark Philippoussis were the defending champions, but they were eliminated in the round-robin competition.

Arnaud Clément and Michaël Llodra won the title, defeating Xavier Malisse and Max Mirnyi in the final, 6–3, 1–6, [10–7].

== Draw ==
=== Key ===
- Q = Qualifier
- WC = Wild card
- LL = Lucky loser
- Alt = Alternate
- ITF = ITF entry
- PR = Protected ranking
- SR = Special ranking
- SE = Special exempt
- JE = Junior exempt
- JR = Junior Accelerator Programme entrant
- CO = College Accelerator Programme entrant
- NG = Next Gen Accelerator Program entrant
- w/o = Walkover
- r = Retired
- d = Defaulted

=== Final ===
Final
A1	(France) Arnaud Clément (France) Michaël Llodra	6	1	[10]
B4	(Belgium) Xavier Malisse (Belarus) Max Mirnyi	3	6	[7]

=== Group A ===
		(France) Clément (France) Llodra	(United Kingdom) Fleming (United Kingdom) Hutchins	(Chile) González (France) Grosjean	(Germany) Haas (Australia) Philippoussis	RR; W–L	Set; W–L	Game; W–L	Standings
A1	(France) Arnaud Clément (France) Michaël Llodra		7–6^{(7–4)}, 7–6^{(7–3)}	6−3, 3−6, [11−9]	6–3, 6–4	3–0	6–1	36–28	1
A2	(United Kingdom) Colin Fleming (United Kingdom) Ross Hutchins	6–7^{(4–7)}, 6–7^{(3–7)}		7–5, 6–4	3–6, 7–6^{(8–6)}, [10–7]	2–1	4–3	36–35	2
A3	(Chile) Fernando González (France) Sébastien Grosjean	3−6, 6−3, [9−11]	5–7, 4–6		3–6, 7–6^{(7–3)}, [7–10]	0–3	2–6	28–36	4
A4	(Germany) Tommy Haas (Australia) Mark Philippoussis	3–6, 4–6	6–3, 6–7^{(6–8)}, [7–10]	6–3, 6–7^{(3–7)}, [10–7]		1–2	3–5	32–33	3

=== Group B ===
		(Croatia) Ančić (Zimbabwe) Black	(United Kingdom) Delgado (United Kingdom) Marray	(Sweden) Enqvist (Sweden) Johansson	(Belgium) Malisse (Belarus) Mirnyi	RR; W–L	Set; W–L	Game; W–L	Standings
B1	(Croatia) Mario Ančić (Zimbabwe) Wayne Black		7−6^{(8−6)}, 6−4	7–6^{(8–6)}, 7−5	3–6, 4–6	2−1	4−2	34−33	2
B2	(United Kingdom) Jamie Delgado (United Kingdom) Jonathan Marray	6−7^{(6−8)}, 4−6		6–2, 6–7^{(7–9)}, [8–10]	6−7^{(5−7)}, 2−6	0−3	1−6	30−36	4
B3	(Sweden) Thomas Enqvist (Sweden) Thomas Johansson	6–7^{(6–8)}, 5−7	2–6, 7–6^{(9–7)}, [10–8]		2–6, 7–6^{(7–4)}, [7–10]	1–2	3–5	30–39	3
B4	(Belgium) Xavier Malisse (Belarus) Max Mirnyi	6–3, 6–4	7−6^{(7−5)}, 6−2	6–2, 6–7^{(4–7)}, [10–7]		3–0	6–1	38–24	1
