= 2019 Wimbledon Championships – Ladies' invitation doubles =

Ladies' invitation doubles
- 2019 Wimbledon Championships

Final
- Champions: (Zimbabwe) Cara Black (United States) Martina Navratilova
- Runners-up: (France) Marion Bartoli (Slovakia) Daniela Hantuchová
- Score: 6–0, 3–6, [10–8]

Events
Singles	men	women		boys	girls
Doubles	men	women	mixed	boys	girls
WC Singles	men	women	quad
WC Doubles	men	women	quad
Legends	men	women	seniors
← 2018 ·	Wimbledon Championships	· 2022 →

Kim Clijsters and Rennae Stubbs were the defending champions but were eliminated in the round robin competition when they withdrew from their third match.

Cara Black and Martina Navratilova won the title, defeating Marion Bartoli and Daniela Hantuchová in the final, 6–0, 3–6, [10–8].

== Draw ==
=== Key ===
- Q = Qualifier
- WC = Wild card
- LL = Lucky loser
- Alt = Alternate
- ITF = ITF entry
- PR = Protected ranking
- SR = Special ranking
- SE = Special exempt
- JE = Junior exempt
- JR = Junior Accelerator Programme entrant
- CO = College Accelerator Programme entrant
- NG = Next Gen Accelerator Program entrant
- w/o = Walkover
- r = Retired
- d = Defaulted

=== Final ===
Final
A2	(France) Marion Bartoli (Slovakia) Daniela Hantuchová	0	6	[8]
B1	(Zimbabwe) Cara Black (United States) Martina Navratilova	6	3	[10]

=== Group A ===
		(United States) Austin (United States) Jaeger	(France) Bartoli (Slovakia) Hantuchová	(Belgium) Clijsters (Australia) Stubbs	(Spain) Martínez (Austria) Schett	RR; W–L	Set; W–L	Game; W–L	Standings
A1	(United States) Tracy Austin (United States) Andrea Jaeger		3−6, 2−6	w/o	2−6, 3−6	1−2	0−4	10−24	4
A2	(France) Marion Bartoli (Slovakia) Daniela Hantuchová	6−3, 6−2		3–6, 4–6	6−3, 2−6, [11−9]	2–1	4–3	28–26	1
A3	(Belgium) Kim Clijsters (Australia) Rennae Stubbs	w/o	6–3, 6–4		6−3, 6−2	2–1	4–0	24–12	2
A4	(Spain) Conchita Martínez (Austria) Barbara Schett	6−2, 6−3	3−6, 6−2, [9−11]	3−6, 2−6		1−2	3−4	26−26	3

=== Group B ===
		(Zimbabwe) Black (United States) Navratilova	(United States) Fernández (Japan) Sugiyama	(United Kingdom) Keothavong (Spain) Sánchez Vicario	(Croatia) Majoli (Bulgaria) Maleeva	RR; W–L	Set; W–L	Game; W–L	Standings
B1	(Zimbabwe) Cara Black (United States) Martina Navratilova		6−3, 6−3	6–3, 6–2	6–3, 6–4	3–0	6–0	36–18	1
B2	(United States) Mary Joe Fernández (Japan) Ai Sugiyama	3−6, 3−6		6–2, 7–6^{(8–6)}	6–3, 0–6, [10–4]	2–1	4–3	26–29	2
B3	(United Kingdom) Anne Keothavong (Spain) Arantxa Sánchez Vicario	3–6, 2–6	2–6, 6–7^{(6–8)}		4−6, 4−6	0–3	0–6	21–37	4
B4	(Croatia) Iva Majoli (Bulgaria) Magdalena Maleeva	3–6, 4–6	3–6, 6–0, [4–10]	6−4, 6−4		1–2	3–4	28–27	3
