= 2019 Wimbledon Championships – Mixed doubles =

Mixed doubles
- 2019 Wimbledon Championships

Final
- Champions: (Croatia) Ivan Dodig (Chinese Taipei) Latisha Chan
- Runners-up: (Sweden) Robert Lindstedt (Latvia) Jeļena Ostapenko
- Score: 6–2, 6–3

Details
- Draw: 48
- Seeds: 16

Events
Singles	men	women		boys	girls
Doubles	men	women	mixed	boys	girls
WC Singles	men	women	quad
WC Doubles	men	women	quad
Legends	men	women	seniors
- Wimbledon Championships

Alexander Peya and Nicole Melichar were the defending champions, but Peya could not participate this year due to injury. Melichar played alongside Bruno Soares but lost in the quarterfinals to Yang Zhaoxuan and Matwé Middelkoop.

Ivan Dodig and Latisha Chan won the title, defeating Robert Lindstedt and Jeļena Ostapenko in the final, 6–2, 6–3.

This was the first Wimbledon edition to feature a final set tie-break. Upon reaching 12–12 in the third set, a classic tie-break would be played.

== Seeds ==
All seeds received a bye into the second round.

1. (Brazil) Bruno Soares / (United States) Nicole Melichar (quarterfinals)
2. (Netherlands) Jean-Julien Rojer / (Netherlands) Demi Schuurs (second round)
3. (Croatia) Mate Pavić / (Canada) Gabriela Dabrowski (third round)
4. (Australia) John Peers / (China) Zhang Shuai (third round)
5. (Netherlands) Wesley Koolhof / (Czech Republic) Květa Peschke (semifinals)
6. (Croatia) Nikola Mektić / (Poland) Alicja Rosolska (third round)
7. (Argentina) Máximo González / (China) Xu Yifan (withdrew)
8. (Croatia) Ivan Dodig / (Chinese Taipei) Latisha Chan (champions)

9. (United Kingdom) Neal Skupski / (Chinese Taipei) Chan Hao-ching (second round)
10. (New Zealand) Michael Venus / (Slovenia) Katarina Srebotnik (second round)
11. (France) Édouard Roger-Vasselin / (Slovenia) Andreja Klepač (third round)
12. (Croatia) Franko Škugor / (Romania) Raluca Olaru (quarterfinals)
13. (India) Rohan Bopanna / (Belarus) Aryna Sabalenka (second round)
14. (France) Fabrice Martin / (United States) Raquel Atawo (second round)
15. (Czech Republic) Roman Jebavý / (Czech Republic) Lucie Hradecká (withdrew)
16. (India) Divij Sharan / (China) Duan Yingying (second round)

Click on the seed number of a player to go to their draw section.

== Draw ==
Key

- Q = Qualifier
- WC = Wild card
- LL = Lucky loser
- Alt = Alternate
- ITF = ITF entry
- PR = Protected ranking
- SR = Special ranking
- SE = Special exempt
- JE = Junior exempt
- JR = Junior Accelerator Programme entrant
- CO = College Accelerator Programme entrant
- NG = Next Gen Accelerator Program entrant
- w/o = Walkover
- r = Retired
- d = Defaulted

=== Finals ===
Quarterfinals
1	(Brazil) Bruno Soares (United States) Nicole Melichar	4	3
(Netherlands) Matwé Middelkoop (China) Yang Zhaoxuan	6	6
(Sweden) Robert Lindstedt (Latvia) Jeļena Ostapenko	6^{6}	6	7
12	(Croatia) Franko Škugor (Romania) Raluca Olaru	7^{8}	3	5
5	(Netherlands) Wesley Koolhof (Czech Republic) Květa Peschke	6	6
(New Zealand) Artem Sitak (Germany) Laura Siegemund	1	2
8	(Croatia) Ivan Dodig (Chinese Taipei) Latisha Chan	7	7^{7}
WC	(United Kingdom) Evan Hoyt (United Kingdom) Eden Silva	5	6^{5}

Semifinals
(Netherlands) Matwé Middelkoop (China) Yang Zhaoxuan	5	2
(Sweden) Robert Lindstedt (Latvia) Jeļena Ostapenko	7	6
5	(Netherlands) Wesley Koolhof (Czech Republic) Květa Peschke	5	4
8	(Croatia) Ivan Dodig (Chinese Taipei) Latisha Chan	7	6

Final
(Sweden) Robert Lindstedt (Latvia) Jeļena Ostapenko	2	3
8	(Croatia) Ivan Dodig (Chinese Taipei) Latisha Chan	6	6

=== Top half ===
==== Section 1 ====
First round
(Ukraine) D Molchanov (Kazakhstan) G Voskoboeva	7^{8}	1	6
(Austria) J Melzer (Russia) A Pavlyuchenkova	6^{6}	6	4
(United Kingdom) A Murray (United States) S Williams	6	6
(Germany) A Mies (Chile) A Guarachi	4	1
WC	(United Kingdom) J O'Mara (United Kingdom) N Broady	6^{4}	3
(Netherlands) M Middelkoop (China) Z Yang	7^{7}	6
(Australia) N Kyrgios (United States) D Krawczyk	7^{7}	6^{4}	5
(New Zealand) M Daniell (United States) J Brady	6^{4}	7^{7}	7

Second round
1	(Brazil) B Soares (United States) N Melichar	7^{7}	3	6
(Ukraine) D Molchanov (Kazakhstan) G Voskoboeva	6^{4}	6	3
(United Kingdom) A Murray (United States) S Williams	7	6
14	(France) F Martin (United States) R Atawo	5	3
9	(United Kingdom) N Skupski (Chinese Taipei) H-c Chan	6^{1}	2
(Netherlands) M Middelkoop (China) Z Yang	7^{7}	6
(New Zealand) M Daniell (United States) J Brady	w/o
7	(Argentina) M González (China) Y Xu

Third round
1	(Brazil) B Soares (United States) N Melichar	6	4	6
(United Kingdom) A Murray (United States) S Williams	3	6	2
(Netherlands) M Middelkoop (China) Z Yang	6	6^{5}	6
(New Zealand) M Daniell (United States) J Brady	2	7^{7}	4

Quarterfinals
1	(Brazil) B Soares (United States) N Melichar	4	3
(Netherlands) M Middelkoop (China) Z Yang	6	6

==== Section 2 ====
First round
(Brazil) M Demoliner (United States) A Spears	3	2
(Finland) H Kontinen (United Kingdom) H Watson	6	6
(Sweden) R Lindstedt (Latvia) J Ostapenko	6	6
WC	(United Kingdom) J Clarke (United States) C Gauff	1	4
WC	(United Kingdom) S Clayton (United Kingdom) SB Grey	2	3
(United States) F Tiafoe (United States) V Williams	6	6
(Indonesia) C Rungkat (Japan) S Aoyama	1	6	6
(France) N Mahut (France) A Cornet	6	4	4

Second round
4	(Australia) J Peers (China) S Zhang	4	6	6
(Finland) H Kontinen (United Kingdom) H Watson	6	3	4
(Sweden) R Lindstedt (Latvia) J Ostapenko	6	6
Alt	(Argentina) A Molteni (Japan) M Ninomiya	3	1
12	(Croatia) F Škugor (Romania) R Olaru	6	6
(United States) F Tiafoe (United States) V Williams	3	1
(Indonesia) C Rungkat (Japan) S Aoyama	5	4
6	(Croatia) N Mektić (Poland) A Rosolska	7	6

Third round
4	(Australia) J Peers (China) S Zhang	6	5	4
(Sweden) R Lindstedt (Latvia) J Ostapenko	2	7	6
12	(Croatia) F Škugor (Romania) R Olaru	6	6
6	(Croatia) N Mektić (Poland) A Rosolska	2	2

Quarterfinals
(Sweden) R Lindstedt (Latvia) J Ostapenko	6^{6}	6	7
12	(Croatia) F Škugor (Romania) R Olaru	7^{8}	3	5

=== Bottom half ===
==== Section 3 ====
First round
(Germany) K Krawietz (United States) S Santamaria	5	2
Alt	(Austria) P Oswald (Australia) M Adamczak	7	6
(Mexico) S González (China) X Han	6^{2}	4
(Pakistan) A-u-H Qureshi (Ukraine) N Kichenok	7^{7}	6
(New Zealand) A Sitak (Germany) L Siegemund	3	6	6
(United Kingdom) K Skupski (Croatia) D Jurak	6	3	4
(United Kingdom) J Murray (United States) B Mattek-Sands	7	7^{10}
WC	(United Kingdom) J Salisbury (United Kingdom) K Dunne	5	6^{8}

Second round
5	(Netherlands) W Koolhof (Czech Republic) K Peschke	6	6
Alt	(Austria) P Oswald (Australia) M Adamczak	1	4
(Pakistan) A-u-H Qureshi (Ukraine) N Kichenok	6	7^{11}
10	(New Zealand) M Venus (Slovenia) K Srebotnik	4	6^{9}
13	(India) R Bopanna (Belarus) A Sabalenka	4	4
(New Zealand) A Sitak (Germany) L Siegemund	6	6
(United Kingdom) J Murray (United States) B Mattek-Sands	4	6	3
3	(Croatia) M Pavić (Canada) G Dabrowski	6	3	6

Third round
5	(Netherlands) W Koolhof (Czech Republic) K Peschke	7^{7}	6
(Pakistan) A-u-H Qureshi (Ukraine) N Kichenok	6^{5}	4
(New Zealand) A Sitak (Germany) L Siegemund	5	7^{7}	13^{7}
3	(Croatia) M Pavić (Canada) G Dabrowski	7	6^{5}	12^{5}

Quarterfinals
5	(Netherlands) W Koolhof (Czech Republic) K Peschke	6	6
(New Zealand) A Sitak (Germany) L Siegemund	1	2

==== Section 4 ====
First round
(Japan) B McLachlan (Japan) M Kato	4	4
(Chinese Taipei) C-p Hsieh (Chinese Taipei) S-w Hsieh	6	6
(United States) R Ram (United States) A Riske	3	4
(United Kingdom) L Bambridge (United States) A Muhammad	6	6
(India) L Paes (Australia) S Stosur	4	6	4
WC	(United Kingdom) E Hoyt (United Kingdom) E Silva	6	2	6
(Denmark) F Nielsen (United States) K Christian	3	5
(Belgium) J Vliegen (China) S Zheng	6	7

Second round
8	(Croatia) I Dodig (Chinese Taipei) L Chan	6	6
(Chinese Taipei) C-p Hsieh (Chinese Taipei) S-w Hsieh	3	2
(United Kingdom) L Bambridge (United States) A Muhammad	4	4
11	(France) É Roger-Vasselin (Slovenia) A Klepač	6	6
16	(India) D Sharan (China) Y Duan	3	4
WC	(United Kingdom) E Hoyt (United Kingdom) E Silva	6	6
(Belgium) J Vliegen (China) S Zheng	6	7
2	(Netherlands) J-J Rojer (Netherlands) D Schuurs	4	5

Third round
8	(Croatia) I Dodig (Chinese Taipei) L Chan	2	6	6
11	(France) É Roger-Vasselin (Slovenia) A Klepač	6	3	4
WC	(United Kingdom) E Hoyt (United Kingdom) E Silva	5	7^{7}	6
(Belgium) J Vliegen (China) S Zheng	7	6^{5}	4

Quarterfinals
8	(Croatia) I Dodig (Chinese Taipei) L Chan	7	7^{7}
WC	(United Kingdom) E Hoyt (United Kingdom) E Silva	5	6^{5}
