= 2019 Wimbledon Championships – Girls' doubles =

Girls' doubles
- 2019 Wimbledon Championships

Final
- Champions: (United States) Savannah Broadus (United States) Abigail Forbes
- Runners-up: (Latvia) Kamilla Bartone (Russia) Oksana Selekhmeteva
- Score: 7–5, 5–7, 6–2

Events
Singles	men	women		boys	girls
Doubles	men	women	mixed	boys	girls
WC Singles	men	women	quad
WC Doubles	men	women	quad
Legends	men	women	seniors
← 2018 ·	Wimbledon Championships	· 2020 →

Savannah Broadus and Abigail Forbes won the title, defeating Kamilla Bartone and Oksana Selekhmeteva in the final, 7–5, 5–7, 6–2.

Wang Xinyu and Wang Xiyu were the defending champions, but chose not to participate.

== Seeds ==
1. (France) Diane Parry / (China) Zheng Qinwen (first round)
2. (Russia) Alina Charaeva / (Russia) Anastasia Tikhonova (quarterfinals)
3. (Japan) Natsumi Kawaguchi / (Hungary) Adrienn Nagy (second round)
4. (Chinese Taipei) Joanna Garland / (South Korea) Park So-hyun (quarterfinals)
5. (United States) Alexa Noel / (Malta) Helene Pellicano (withdrew)
6. (Ukraine) Liubov Kostenko / (Burundi) Sada Nahimana (first round)
7. (United States) Chloe Beck / (United States) Emma Navarro (quarterfinals)
8. (United States) Hurricane Tyra Black / (Israel) Shavit Kimchi (second round)

== Draw ==
=== Key ===
- Q = Qualifier
- WC = Wild card
- LL = Lucky loser
- Alt = Alternate
- SE = Special exempt
- PR = Protected ranking
- ITF = ITF entry
- JE = Junior exempt
- w/o = Walkover
- r = Retired
- d = Defaulted
- SR = Special ranking

=== Finals ===
Semifinals
(Latvia) Kamilla Bartone (Russia) Oksana Selekhmeteva	7^{8}	7
(Russia) Polina Kudermetova (France) Giulia Morlet	6^{6}	5
(France) Aubane Droguet (France) Séléna Janicijevic	1	1
(United States) Savannah Broadus (United States) Abigail Forbes	6	6

Final
(Latvia) Kamilla Bartone (Russia) Oksana Selekhmeteva	5	7	2
(United States) Savannah Broadus (United States) Abigail Forbes	7	5	6

=== Top half ===
First round
1	(France) Diane Parry (China) Zheng Qinwen	5	4
(Latvia) Kamilla Bartone (Russia) Oksana Selekhmeteva	7	6
(Russia) Elina Avanesyan (France) Elsa Jacquemot	2	4
(United States) Robin Montgomery (Colombia) Camila Osorio	6	6
(Russia) Daria Frayman (Latvia) Darja Semenistaja	6^{5}	4
WC	(United Kingdom) Holly Fischer (United Kingdom) Matilda Mutavdzic	7^{7}	6
(Slovenia) Pia Lovrič (Thailand) Mai Napatt Nirundorn	6^{5}	3
7	(United States) Chloe Beck (United States) Emma Navarro	7^{7}	6
3	(Japan) Natsumi Kawaguchi (Hungary) Adrienn Nagy	2	6	6
(France) Carole Monnet (Hong Kong) Cody Wong Hong-yi	6	3	4
(Russia) Polina Kudermetova (France) Giulia Morlet	6	6
WC	(United Kingdom) Sonay Kartal (United Kingdom) Erin Richardson	1	4
(Japan) Funa Kozaki (Hungary) Amarissa Kiara Tóth	6	6
(Ecuador) Mell Reasco (Colombia) Antonia Samudio	3	2
(Spain) Carlota Martínez Círez (Spain) Ane Mintegi del Olmo	3	7^{7}	6
Alt	(Slovakia) Michaela Kadlečková (United States) Katrina Scott	6	6^{4}	3

Second round
(Latvia) K Bartone (Russia) O Selekhmeteva	6	6
(United States) R Montgomery (Colombia) C Osorio	4	4
WC	(United Kingdom) H Fischer (United Kingdom) M Mutavdzic	3	7	4
7	(United States) C Beck (United States) E Navarro	6	5	6
3	(Japan) N Kawaguchi (Hungary) A Nagy	6	4	5
(Russia) P Kudermetova (France) G Morlet	4	6	7
(Japan) F Kozaki (Hungary) AK Tóth	6	6
(Spain) C Martínez Círez (Spain) A Mintegi del Olmo	4	1

Quarterfinals
(Latvia) K Bartone (Russia) O Selekhmeteva	6	6
7	(United States) C Beck (United States) E Navarro	4	3
(Russia) P Kudermetova (France) G Morlet	7^{11}	6
(Japan) F Kozaki (Hungary) AK Tóth	6^{9}	4

Semifinals
(Latvia) K Bartone (Russia) O Selekhmeteva	7^{8}	7
(Russia) P Kudermetova (France) G Morlet	6^{6}	5

=== Bottom half ===
First round
8	(United States) Hurricane Tyra Black (Israel) Shavit Kimchi	6	6
(Slovakia) Romana Čisovská (Russia) Diana Shnaider	4	4
(France) Aubane Droguet (France) Séléna Janicijevic	6	6
(Indonesia) Priska Madelyn Nugroho (Australia) Annerly Poulos	2	4
(Switzerland) Valentina Ryser (Germany) Alexandra Vecic	3	7	6
WC	(United Kingdom) Victoria Allen (United Kingdom) Destinee Martins	6	5	4
(United States) Charlotte Owensby (United States) Alexandra Yepifanova	3	2
4	(Chinese Taipei) Joanna Garland (South Korea) Park So-hyun	6	6
6	(Ukraine) Liubov Kostenko (Burundi) Sada Nahimana	1	4
(United States) Savannah Broadus (United States) Abigail Forbes	6	6
(Poland) Weronika Baszak (Poland) Martyna Kubka	4	6	6
WC	(United Kingdom) Amelia Bissett (United Kingdom) Morgan Cross	6	4	2
(Thailand) Thasaporn Naklo (Thailand) Mananchaya Sawangkaew	3	6	3^{r}
(Czech Republic) Linda Fruhvirtová (Czech Republic) Kristýna Lavičková	6	3	5
(Spain) Marta Custic (United States) Elizabeth Mandlik	6^{4}	6	4
2	(Russia) Alina Charaeva (Russia) Anastasia Tikhonova	7^{7}	4	6

Second round
8	(United States) HT Black (Israel) S Kimchi	5	0
(France) A Droguet (France) S Janicijevic	7	6
(Switzerland) V Ryser (Germany) A Vecic	4	4
4	(Chinese Taipei) J Garland (South Korea) S-h Park	6	6
(United States) S Broadus (United States) A Forbes	6	7
(Poland) W Baszak (Poland) M Kubka	4	5
(Czech Republic) L Fruhvirtová (Czech Republic) K Lavičková	6	6^{4}	3
2	(Russia) A Charaeva (Russia) A Tikhonova	4	7^{7}	6

Quarterfinals
(France) A Droguet (France) S Janicijevic	6	6
4	(Chinese Taipei) J Garland (South Korea) S-h Park	2	3
(United States) S Broadus (United States) A Forbes	6^{3}	6	9
2	(Russia) A Charaeva (Russia) A Tikhonova	7^{7}	3	7

Semifinals
(France) A Droguet (France) S Janicijevic	1	1
(United States) S Broadus (United States) A Forbes	6	6
