= 2019 Wimbledon Championships – Wheelchair men's doubles =

Wheelchair men's doubles
- 2019 Wimbledon Championships

Final
- Champions: (Belgium) Joachim Gérard (Sweden) Stefan Olsson
- Runners-up: (United Kingdom) Alfie Hewett (United Kingdom) Gordon Reid
- Score: 6−4, 6−2

Events
Singles	men	women		boys	girls
Doubles	men	women	mixed	boys	girls
WC Singles	men	women	quad
WC Doubles	men	women	quad
Legends	men	women	seniors
← 2018 ·	Wimbledon Championships	· 2021 →

Joachim Gérard and Stefan Olsson defeated the three-time defending champions Alfie Hewett and Gordon Reid in the final, 6−4, 6−2 to win the gentlemen's doubles wheelchair tennis title at the 2019 Wimbledon Championships. It was their first Wimbledon title as a pair, and Olsson's second Wimbledon doubles title overall.

== Seeds ==
1. (France) Stéphane Houdet / (France) Nicolas Peifer (semifinals)
2. (Belgium) Joachim Gérard / (Sweden) Stefan Olsson (champions)

== Draw ==
=== Key ===
- Q = Qualifier
- WC = Wild card
- LL = Lucky loser
- Alt = Alternate
- ITF = ITF entry
- PR = Protected ranking
- SR = Special ranking
- SE = Special exempt
- JE = Junior exempt
- JR = Junior Accelerator Programme entrant
- CO = College Accelerator Programme entrant
- NG = Next Gen Accelerator Program entrant
- w/o = Walkover
- r = Retired
- d = Defaulted

=== Finals ===
Semifinals
1	(France) Stéphane Houdet (France) Nicolas Peifer	3	6	6^{4}
(United Kingdom) Alfie Hewett (United Kingdom) Gordon Reid	6	2	7^{7}
(Argentina) Gustavo Fernández (Japan) Shingo Kunieda	3	7	6^{5}
2	(Belgium) Joachim Gérard (Sweden) Stefan Olsson	6	5	7^{7}

Final
(United Kingdom) Alfie Hewett (United Kingdom) Gordon Reid	4	2
2	(Belgium) Joachim Gérard (Sweden) Stefan Olsson	6	6
