= 2019 Wimbledon Championships – Wheelchair women's singles =

Wheelchair women's singles
- 2019 Wimbledon Championships

Final
- Champion: (Netherlands) Aniek van Koot
- Runner-up: (Netherlands) Diede de Groot
- Score: 6–4, 4–6, 7–5

Events
Singles	men	women		boys	girls
Doubles	men	women	mixed	boys	girls
WC Singles	men	women	quad
WC Doubles	men	women	quad
Legends	men	women	seniors
← 2018 ·	Wimbledon Championships	· 2021 →

Aniek van Koot defeated the two-time defending champion Diede de Groot in the final, 6–4, 4–6, 7–5 to win the ladies' singles wheelchair tennis title at the 2019 Wimbledon Championships. It was de Groot's only loss at the majors that year, preventing her from achieving the Grand Slam.

== Seeds ==
1. (Netherlands) Diede de Groot (final)
2. (Japan) Yui Kamiji (semifinals)

== Draw ==
=== Key ===
- Q = Qualifier
- WC = Wild card
- LL = Lucky loser
- Alt = Alternate
- ITF = ITF entry
- PR = Protected ranking
- SR = Special ranking
- SE = Special exempt
- JE = Junior exempt
- JR = Junior Accelerator Programme entrant
- CO = College Accelerator Programme entrant
- NG = Next Gen Accelerator Program entrant
- w/o = Walkover
- r = Retired
- d = Defaulted

=== Finals ===
Quarterfinals
1	(Netherlands) Diede de Groot	7^{7}	4	6
(Netherlands) Marjolein Buis	6^{3}	6	1
(South Africa) Kgothatso Montjane	6^{3}	6	6
(Germany) Sabine Ellerbrock	7^{7}	1	2
(Netherlands) Aniek van Koot	6	6
(Italy) Giulia Capocci	3	2
WC	(United Kingdom) Jordanne Whiley	4	1
2	(Japan) Yui Kamiji	6	6

Semifinals
1	(Netherlands) Diede de Groot	6	6
(South Africa) Kgothatso Montjane	3	2
(Netherlands) Aniek van Koot	6	6
2	(Japan) Yui Kamiji	3	4

Final
1	(Netherlands) Diede de Groot	4	6	5
(Netherlands) Aniek van Koot	6	4	7
