= 2019 Wimbledon Championships – Wheelchair women's doubles =

Wheelchair women's doubles
- 2019 Wimbledon Championships

Final
- Champions: (Netherlands) Diede de Groot (Netherlands) Aniek van Koot
- Runners-up: (Netherlands) Marjolein Buis (Italy) Giulia Capocci
- Score: 6−1, 6−1

Events
Singles	men	women		boys	girls
Doubles	men	women	mixed	boys	girls
WC Singles	men	women	quad
WC Doubles	men	women	quad
Legends	men	women	seniors
← 2018 ·	Wimbledon Championships	· 2021 →

Defending champion Diede de Groot and her partner Aniek van Koot defeated Marjolein Buis and Giulia Capocci in the final, 6−1, 6−1 to win the ladies' doubles wheelchair tennis title at the 2019 Wimbledon Championships. It was their third step towards an eventual Grand Slam.

De Groot and Yui Kamiji were the defending champions, but did not participate together. Kamiji partnered Jordanne Whiley, but was defeated in the semifinals by de Groot and van Koot.

== Seeds ==
1. (Netherlands) Diede de Groot / (Netherlands) Aniek van Koot (champions)
2. (Netherlands) Marjolein Buis / (Italy) Giulia Capocci (final)

== Draw ==
=== Key ===
- Q = Qualifier
- WC = Wild card
- LL = Lucky loser
- Alt = Alternate
- ITF = ITF entry
- PR = Protected ranking
- SR = Special ranking
- SE = Special exempt
- JE = Junior exempt
- JR = Junior Accelerator Programme entrant
- CO = College Accelerator Programme entrant
- NG = Next Gen Accelerator Program entrant
- w/o = Walkover
- r = Retired
- d = Defaulted

=== Finals ===
Semifinals
1	(Netherlands) Diede de Groot (Netherlands) Aniek van Koot	3	7^{7}	6
(Japan) Yui Kamiji (United Kingdom) Jordanne Whiley	6	6^{2}	1
(Germany) Sabine Ellerbrock (South Africa) Kgothatso Montjane	5	2
2	(Netherlands) Marjolein Buis (Italy) Giulia Capocci	7	6

Final
1	(Netherlands) Diede de Groot (Netherlands) Aniek van Koot	6	6
2	(Netherlands) Marjolein Buis (Italy) Giulia Capocci	1	1
