= 2019 Wimbledon Championships – Senior gentlemen's invitation doubles =

Senior gentlemen's invitation doubles
- 2019 Wimbledon Championships

Final
- Champions: (Sweden) Jonas Björkman (Australia) Todd Woodbridge
- Runners-up: (Netherlands) Jacco Eltingh (Netherlands) Paul Haarhuis
- Score: 4−6, 6−3, [10−6]

Events
Singles	men	women		boys	girls
Doubles	men	women	mixed	boys	girls
WC Singles	men	women	quad
WC Doubles	men	women	quad
Legends	men	women	seniors
← 2018 ·	Wimbledon Championships

Jonas Björkman and Todd Woodbridge were the defending champions and successfully defended their title, defeating Jacco Eltingh and Paul Haarhuis in the final, 4−6, 6−3, [10−6].

== Draw ==
=== Key ===
- Q = Qualifier
- WC = Wild card
- LL = Lucky loser
- Alt = Alternate
- ITF = ITF entry
- PR = Protected ranking
- SR = Special ranking
- SE = Special exempt
- JE = Junior exempt
- JR = Junior Accelerator Programme entrant
- CO = College Accelerator Programme entrant
- NG = Next Gen Accelerator Program entrant
- w/o = Walkover
- r = Retired
- d = Defaulted

=== Final ===
Final
A3	(Sweden) Jonas Björkman (Australia) Todd Woodbridge	4	6	[10]
B1	(Netherlands) Jacco Eltingh (Netherlands) Paul Haarhuis	6	3	[6]

=== Group A ===
		(France) Bahrami (United Kingdom) Wilkinson	(United Kingdom) Bates (United Kingdom) Castle	(Sweden) Björkman (Australia) Woodbridge	(South Africa) Ferreira (Australia) Woodforde	RR; W–L	Set; W–L	Game; W–L	Standings
A1	(France) Mansour Bahrami (United Kingdom) Chris Wilkinson		4–6, 6–3, [4–10]	4–6, 3–6	3–6, 5–7	0–3	1–6	25–35	4
A2	(United Kingdom) Jeremy Bates (United Kingdom) Andrew Castle	6–4, 3–6, [10–4]		4–6, 2–6	5–7, 6–7^{(3–7)}	1–2	2–5	27–36	3
A3	(Sweden) Jonas Björkman (Australia) Todd Woodbridge	6–4, 6–3	6–4, 6–2		6−3, 6−3	3–0	6−0	36–19	1
A4	(South Africa) Wayne Ferreira (Australia) Mark Woodforde	6–3, 7–5	7–5, 7–6^{(7–3)}	3−6, 3−6		2–1	4–2	33–31	2

=== Group B ===
		(Netherlands) Eltingh (Netherlands) Haarhuis	(Netherlands) Krajicek (United Kingdom) Petchey	(France) Leconte (United States) McEnroe	(United Kingdom) Rusedski (France) Santoro	RR; W–L	Set; W–L	Game; W–L	Standings
B1	(Netherlands) Jacco Eltingh (Netherlands) Paul Haarhuis		5−7, 6−1, [10−7]	6−3, 7−5	3–6, 1–1, ret.	3−0	5−2	29−23	1
B2	(Netherlands) Richard Krajicek (United Kingdom) Mark Petchey	7−5, 1−6, [7−10]		6−3, 6−4	5−7, 3−6	1−2	3−4	28−32	3
B3	(France) Henri Leconte (United States) Patrick McEnroe	3−6, 5−7	3−6, 4−6		4–6, 2–6	0−3	0−6	21−37	4
B4	(United Kingdom) Greg Rusedski (France) Fabrice Santoro	6–3, 1–1, ret.	7−5, 6−3	6–4, 6–2		2−1	5−1	32−18	2
