= 2019 Wimbledon Championships – Girls' singles =

Girls' singles
- 2019 Wimbledon Championships

Final
- Champion: (Ukraine) Daria Snigur
- Runner-up: (United States) Alexa Noel
- Score: 6−4, 6−4

Events
Singles	men	women		boys	girls
Doubles	men	women	mixed	boys	girls
WC Singles	men	women	quad
WC Doubles	men	women	quad
Legends	men	women	seniors
← 2018 ·	Wimbledon Championships	· 2021 →

Daria Snigur won the title, defeating Alexa Noel 6−4, 6−4 in the final.

Iga Świątek was the defending champion, but chose to compete in the women's singles competition instead. She lost to Viktorija Golubic in the first round.

== Seeds ==
1. (United States) Emma Navarro (semifinals)
2. (Colombia) Camila Osorio (second round)
3. (China) Zheng Qinwen (third round)
4. (France) Diane Parry (semifinals)
5. (United States) Hurricane Tyra Black (first round)
6. (Japan) Natsumi Kawaguchi (quarterfinals)
7. (Burundi) Sada Nahimana (first round)
8. (Russia) Alina Charaeva (first round)

9. (Thailand) Mananchaya Sawangkaew (first round)
10. (United States) Alexa Noel (final)
11. (Latvia) Kamilla Bartone (first round)
12. (South Korea) Park So-hyun (second round)
13. (Russia) Anastasia Tikhonova (first round)
14. (Chinese Taipei) Joanna Garland (first round)
15. (Malta) Helene Pellicano (second round, retired)
16. (Hungary) Adrienn Nagy (first round)

Click on the seed number of a player to go to their draw section.

== Draw ==
=== Key ===
- Q = Qualifier
- WC = Wild card
- LL = Lucky loser
- Alt = Alternate
- SE = Special exempt
- PR = Protected ranking
- ITF = ITF entry
- JE = Junior exempt
- w/o = Walkover
- r = Retired
- d = Defaulted
- SR = Special ranking

=== Finals ===
Quarterfinals
1	(United States) Emma Navarro	4	6	6
6	(Japan) Natsumi Kawaguchi	6	1	1
Q	(Russia) Polina Kudermetova	2	4
(Ukraine) Daria Snigur	6	6
(France) Elsa Jacquemot	1	4
4	(France) Diane Parry	6	6
10	(United States) Alexa Noel	7^{7}	6
(Indonesia) Priska Madelyn Nugroho	6^{4}	2

Semifinals
1	(United States) Emma Navarro	3	0
(Ukraine) Daria Snigur	6	6
4	(France) Diane Parry	2	1
10	(United States) Alexa Noel	6	6

Final
(Ukraine) Daria Snigur	6	6
10	(United States) Alexa Noel	4	4

=== Top half ===
==== Section 1 ====
First round
1	(United States) Emma Navarro	6	6
(Russia) Diana Shnaider	0	2
(Colombia) Antonia Samudio	3	2
(France) Séléna Janicijevic	6	6
WC	(United Kingdom) Sonay Kartal	7^{7}	7^{7}
(Australia) Annerly Poulos	6^{1}	6^{3}
Q	(United States) Katrina Scott	6	6
16	(Hungary) Adrienn Nagy	3	4
9	(Thailand) Mananchaya Sawangkaew	7^{7}	5	9
(United States) Elizabeth Mandlik	6^{2}	7	11
(Russia) Elina Avanesyan	6	6
(Spain) Carlota Martínez Círez	3	0
WC	(United Kingdom) Emma Raducanu	6	1	5
Q	(Poland) Martyna Kubka	0	6	7
(Germany) Alexandra Vecic	1	7	4
6	(Japan) Natsumi Kawaguchi	6	5	6

Second round
1	(United States) E Navarro	4	6	7
(France) S Janicijevic	6	4	5
WC	(United Kingdom) S Kartal	1	4
Q	(United States) K Scott	6	6
(United States) E Mandlik	6	6
(Russia) E Avanesyan	0	0
Q	(Poland) M Kubka	1	6^{5}
6	(Japan) N Kawaguchi	6	7^{7}

Third round
1	(United States) E Navarro	0	6	6
Q	(United States) K Scott	6	1	1
(United States) E Mandlik	6	4	0^{r}
6	(Japan) N Kawaguchi	3	6	0

Quarterfinals
1	(United States) E Navarro	4	6	6
6	(Japan) N Kawaguchi	6	1	1

==== Section 2 ====
First round
3	(China) Zheng Qinwen	6	6
(Thailand) Thasaporn Naklo	0	2
(United States) Savannah Broadus	6	5	2
(France) Carole Monnet	2	7	6
Q	(Russia) Polina Kudermetova	6	6
WC	(United Kingdom) Amarni Banks	1	0
Q	(United States) Alexandra Yepifanova	6	3	4
15	(Malta) Helene Pellicano	1	6	6
11	(Latvia) Kamilla Bartone	1	4
(Ukraine) Daria Snigur	6	6
(Czech Republic) Kristýna Lavičková	2	7^{7}	1
WC	(United Kingdom) Erin Richardson	6	6^{5}	6
(Spain) Marta Custic	4	6^{5}
(United States) Robin Montgomery	6	7^{7}
Q	(Japan) Funa Kozaki	6	6
8	(Russia) Alina Charaeva	2	3

Second round
3	(China) Q Zheng	6	4	6
(France) C Monnet	3	6	2
Q	(Russia) P Kudermetova	6	0
15	(Malta) H Pellicano	2	0^{r}
(Ukraine) D Snigur	6	6
WC	(United Kingdom) E Richardson	0	1
(United States) R Montgomery	7^{7}	6
Q	(Japan) F Kozaki	6^{1}	2

Third round
3	(China) Q Zheng	2	1
Q	(Russia) P Kudermetova	6	6
(Ukraine) D Snigur	6^{4}	6	6
(United States) R Montgomery	7^{7}	1	2

Quarterfinals
Q	(Russia) P Kudermetova	2	4
(Ukraine) D Snigur	6	6

=== Bottom half ===
==== Section 3 ====
First round
5	(United States) Hurricane Tyra Black	2	0
(France) Elsa Jacquemot	6	6
Q	(Poland) Weronika Baszak	2	5
(Russia) Oksana Selekhmeteva	6	7
(Thailand) Mai Napatt Nirundorn	7	4	6
WC	(United Kingdom) Holly Fischer	5	6	1
(Switzerland) Valentina Ryser	5	6	6
12	(South Korea) Park So-hyun	7	4	8
13	(Russia) Anastasia Tikhonova	4	2
(Hong Kong) Cody Wong Hong-yi	6	6
(Spain) Ane Mintegi del Olmo	6	6
WC	(United Kingdom) Victoria Allen	3	3
(United States) Abigail Forbes	6	6^{8}	6
(Ukraine) Liubov Kostenko	2	7^{10}	3
(Latvia) Darja Semenistaja	3	3
4	(France) Diane Parry	6	6

Second round
(France) E Jacquemot	7	6
(Russia) O Selekhmeteva	5	1
(Thailand) MN Nirundorn	6	3	6
12	(South Korea) S-h Park	4	6	3
(Hong Kong) CH-y Wong	6	6
(Spain) A Mintegi del Olmo	1	3
(United States) A Forbes	6^{5}	4
4	(France) D Parry	7^{7}	6

Third round
(France) E Jacquemot	7	6
(Thailand) MN Nirundorn	5	0
(Hong Kong) CH-y Wong	2	3
4	(France) D Parry	6	6

Quarterfinals
(France) E Jacquemot	1	4
4	(France) D Parry	6	6

==== Section 4 ====
First round
7	(Burundi) Sada Nahimana	3	6	3
WC	(United Kingdom) Matilda Mutavdzic	6	3	6
(Russia) Daria Frayman	7	2	8
(Slovenia) Pia Lovrič	5	6	6
Q	(United States) Charlotte Owensby	6	6
(Israel) Shavit Kimchi	2	2
Q	(Hungary) Amarissa Kiara Tóth	4	4
10	(United States) Alexa Noel	6	6
14	(Chinese Taipei) Joanna Garland	2	2
(France) Aubane Droguet	6	6
(Indonesia) Priska Madelyn Nugroho	6^{7}	6	6
(United States) Chloe Beck	7^{9}	2	4
(Czech Republic) Linda Fruhvirtová	6	5	6
WC	(United Kingdom) Destinee Martins	4	7	1
(Ecuador) Mell Reasco	1	2
2	(Colombia) Camila Osorio	6	6

Second round
WC	(United Kingdom) M Mutavdzic	4	6	6
(Russia) D Frayman	6	3	3
Q	(United States) C Owensby	2	1
10	(United States) A Noel	6	6
(France) A Droguet	6	4	0
(Indonesia) PM Nugroho	3	6	6
(Czech Republic) L Fruhvirtová	6	6
2	(Colombia) C Osorio	4	3

Third round
WC	(United Kingdom) M Mutavdzic	4	4
10	(United States) A Noel	6	6
(Indonesia) PM Nugroho	4	6	6
(Czech Republic) L Fruhvirtová	6	3	3

Quarterfinals
10	(United States) A Noel	7^{7}	6
(Indonesia) PM Nugroho	6^{4}	2

== Qualifying ==
=== Seeds ===
1. (Russia) Polina Kudermetova (qualified)
2. (Slovakia) Romana Čisovská (qualifying competition)
3. (France) Giulia Morlet (qualifying competition)
4. (Brazil) Ana Luiza Cruz (first round)
5. (United States) Katrina Scott (qualified)
6. (Hungary) Amarissa Kiara Tóth (qualified)
7. (Italy) Melania Delai (qualifying competition)
8. (Italy) Sara Ziodato (qualifying competition)
9. (China) Han Jiangxue (qualifying competition)
10. (Peru) Dana Guzmán (first round)
11. (Slovakia) Michaela Kadlečková (qualifying competition)
12. (United States) Charlotte Owensby (qualified)
13. (Poland) Weronika Baszak (qualified)
14. (United States) Alexandra Yepifanova (qualified)
15. (Japan) Funa Kozaki (qualified)
16. (Poland) Martyna Kubka (qualified)

=== Qualifiers ===
1. (Russia) Polina Kudermetova
2. (Poland) Martyna Kubka
3. (United States) Charlotte Owensby
4. (United States) Alexandra Yepifanova
5. (United States) Katrina Scott
6. (Hungary) Amarissa Kiara Tóth
7. (Japan) Funa Kozaki
8. (Poland) Weronika Baszak

=== Draw ===
==== First qualifier ====
First round				Qualifying competition
				1	(Russia) Polina Kudermetova	6	6
				11	(Slovakia) Michaela Kadlečková	3	2
	(United Kingdom) Amelia Bissett	0	4	11	(Slovakia) Michaela Kadlečková	3	2
11	(Slovakia) Michaela Kadlečková	6	6

==== Second qualifier ====
First round				Qualifying competition
				2	(Slovakia) Romana Čisovská	3	0
				16	(Poland) Martyna Kubka	6	6
	(United Kingdom) Elisa van Meeteren	0	2	16	(Poland) Martyna Kubka	6	6
16	(Poland) Martyna Kubka	6	6

==== Third qualifier ====
First round				Qualifying competition
				3	(France) Giulia Morlet	3	2
				12	(United States) Charlotte Owensby	6	6
	(United Kingdom) Lillian Mould	3	3	12	(United States) Charlotte Owensby	6	6
12	(United States) Charlotte Owensby	6	6

==== Fourth qualifier ====
First round
4	(Brazil) Ana Luiza Cruz	6^{2}	6	2
(United Kingdom) Holly Staff	7^{7}	0	6
(Italy) Lisa Pigato	3	3
14	(United States) Alexandra Yepifanova	6	6

Qualifying competition
(United Kingdom) Holly Staff	0	1
14	(United States) Alexandra Yepifanova	6	6

==== Fifth qualifier ====
First round
5	(United States) Katrina Scott	6	6
(Russia) Veronika Pepelyaeva	4	4
(United Kingdom) Tanysha Dissanayake	0	3
9	(China) Han Jiangxue	6	6

Qualifying competition
5	(United States) Katrina Scott	6	6
9	(China) Han Jiangxue	1	2

==== Sixth qualifier ====
First round
6	(Hungary) Amarissa Kiara Tóth	6	7^{7}
(Poland) Aleksandra Julia Jeleń	0	6^{4}
(United Kingdom) Indianna Spink	7	6
10	(Peru) Dana Guzmán	5	3

Qualifying competition
6	(Hungary) Amarissa Kiara Tóth	7	7
(United Kingdom) Indianna Spink	5	5

==== Seventh qualifier ====
First round
7	(Italy) Melania Delai	6	2	11
(United Kingdom) Esther Adeshina	2	6	9
(United Kingdom) Morgan Cross	1	2
15	(Japan) Funa Kozaki	6	6

Qualifying competition
7	(Italy) Melania Delai	4	4
15	(Japan) Funa Kozaki	6	6

==== Eighth qualifier ====
First round
8	(Italy) Sara Ziodato	6	7^{7}
(Puerto Rico) Lauren Anzalotta Kynoch	3	6^{4}
(United Kingdom) Sasha Hill	3	6	2
13	(Poland) Weronika Baszak	6	4	6

Qualifying competition
8	(Italy) Sara Ziodato	3	4
13	(Poland) Weronika Baszak	6	6
