= 2019 Wimbledon Championships – Wheelchair men's singles =

Wheelchair men's singles
- 2019 Wimbledon Championships

Final
- Champion: (Argentina) Gustavo Fernández
- Runner-up: (Japan) Shingo Kunieda
- Score: 4–6, 6–3, 6–2

Events
Singles	men	women		boys	girls
Doubles	men	women	mixed	boys	girls
WC Singles	men	women	quad
WC Doubles	men	women	quad
Legends	men	women	seniors
← 2018 ·	Wimbledon Championships	· 2021 →

Gustavo Fernández defeated Shingo Kunieda in the final, 4–6, 6–3, 6–2 to win the gentlemen's singles wheelchair tennis title at the 2019 Wimbledon Championships. It was his first Wimbledon singles title and fifth major singles title overall, and he became the first player to achieve the Surface Slam in wheelchair men's singles.

Stefan Olsson was the two-time defending champion, but was defeated in the semifinals by Kunieda.

Kunieda was attempting to complete the career Super Slam.

== Seeds ==
1. (Japan) Shingo Kunieda (final)
2. (Argentina) Gustavo Fernández (champion)

== Draw ==
=== Key ===
- Q = Qualifier
- WC = Wild card
- LL = Lucky loser
- Alt = Alternate
- ITF = ITF entry
- PR = Protected ranking
- SR = Special ranking
- SE = Special exempt
- JE = Junior exempt
- JR = Junior Accelerator Programme entrant
- CO = College Accelerator Programme entrant
- NG = Next Gen Accelerator Program entrant
- w/o = Walkover
- r = Retired
- d = Defaulted

=== Finals ===
Quarterfinals
1	(Japan) Shingo Kunieda	6	6
WC	(United Kingdom) Gordon Reid	1	1
(Belgium) Joachim Gérard	6	4	3
(Sweden) Stefan Olsson	2	6	6
(France) Stéphane Houdet	6^{5}	6	6
(France) Nicolas Peifer	7^{7}	3	3
(United Kingdom) Alfie Hewett	1	3
2	(Argentina) Gustavo Fernández	6	6

Semifinals
1	(Japan) Shingo Kunieda	4	6	6
(Sweden) Stefan Olsson	6	2	3
(France) Stéphane Houdet	0	4
2	(Argentina) Gustavo Fernández	6	6

Final
1	(Japan) Shingo Kunieda	6	3	2
2	(Argentina) Gustavo Fernández	4	6	6
