= 2019 Wimbledon Championships =

- Date: 1–14 July
- Edition: 133rd
- Category: Grand Slam (ITF)
- Draw: 128S / 64D / 48XD
- Prize money: £ 38,000,000
- Surface: Grass
- Location: Church Road; SW19, Wimbledon, London, United Kingdom
- Venue: All England Lawn Tennis and Croquet Club

Champions

Men's singles
- (Serbia) Novak Djokovic

Women's singles
- (Romania) Simona Halep

Men's doubles
- (Colombia) Juan Sebastián Cabal / (Colombia) Robert Farah

Women's doubles
- (Chinese Taipei) Hsieh Su-wei / (Czech Republic) Barbora Strýcová

Mixed doubles
- (Croatia) Ivan Dodig / (Chinese Taipei) Latisha Chan

Wheelchair men's singles
- (Argentina) Gustavo Fernández

Wheelchair women's singles
- (Netherlands) Aniek van Koot

Wheelchair quad singles
- (Australia) Dylan Alcott

Wheelchair men's doubles
- (Belgium) Joachim Gérard / (Sweden) Stefan Olsson

Wheelchair women's doubles
- (Netherlands) Diede de Groot / (Netherlands) Aniek van Koot

Wheelchair quad doubles
- (Australia) Dylan Alcott / (United Kingdom) Andrew Lapthorne

Boys' singles
- (Japan) Shintaro Mochizuki

Girls' singles
- (Ukraine) Daria Snigur

Boys' doubles
- (Czech Republic) Jonáš Forejtek / (Czech Republic) Jiří Lehečka

Girls' doubles
- (United States) Savannah Broadus / (United States) Abigail Forbes

Gentlemen's invitation doubles
- (France) Arnaud Clément / (France) Michaël Llodra

Ladies' invitation doubles
- (Zimbabwe) Cara Black / (United States) Martina Navratilova

Senior gentlemen's invitation doubles
- (Sweden) Jonas Björkman / (Australia) Todd Woodbridge
← 2018 ·	Wimbledon Championships	· 2020 →

The 2019 Wimbledon Championships was a Grand Slam tennis tournament that took place at the All England Lawn Tennis and Croquet Club in Wimbledon, London, United Kingdom. The main tournament began on Monday 1 July 2019 and finished on Sunday 14 July 2019.

The defending gentlemen's singles champion Novak Djokovic retained his title, while the defending ladies' singles champion Angelique Kerber lost in the second round to Lauren Davis. Simona Halep won the ladies' singles title, her second major title after the French Open in 2018. This tournament marked the first grand slam main draw appearance of 2023 US Open women's singles champion Coco Gauff, who progressed to the fourth round as a fifteen-year-old, after being awarded a wildcard into qualifying.

This was the first edition of the tournament to feature a standard tie break in the final set when the score in the set was 12 games all. The winner was the first player or pair to reach seven points whilst leading by two or more points or, in the case of a 6-6 point score, to establish a subsequent lead of two points. Henri Kontinen and John Peers won the first such tie break played in Wimbledon history, defeating Rajeev Ram and Joe Salisbury in a third-round men's doubles match. In men's singles, the only such match was the final in which Novak Djokovic defeated Roger Federer, in what was also the longest final in tournament history lasting for 4 hours and 57 minutes.

Women's singles included 16 qualifiers from 128 entrants, an increase from 12 qualifiers from 96 entrants. Doubles qualifying was eliminated as a result. The change brought the qualification for the women's singles into line with that for the men's singles, which remained unchanged.

This was the last edition of the Wimbledon Championships until 2021 after the event would be cancelled in 2020 due to the COVID-19 pandemic, the first such cancellation since World War II. This was also the last major final contested by eight-time champion and twelve-time finalist Roger Federer.

== Tournament ==
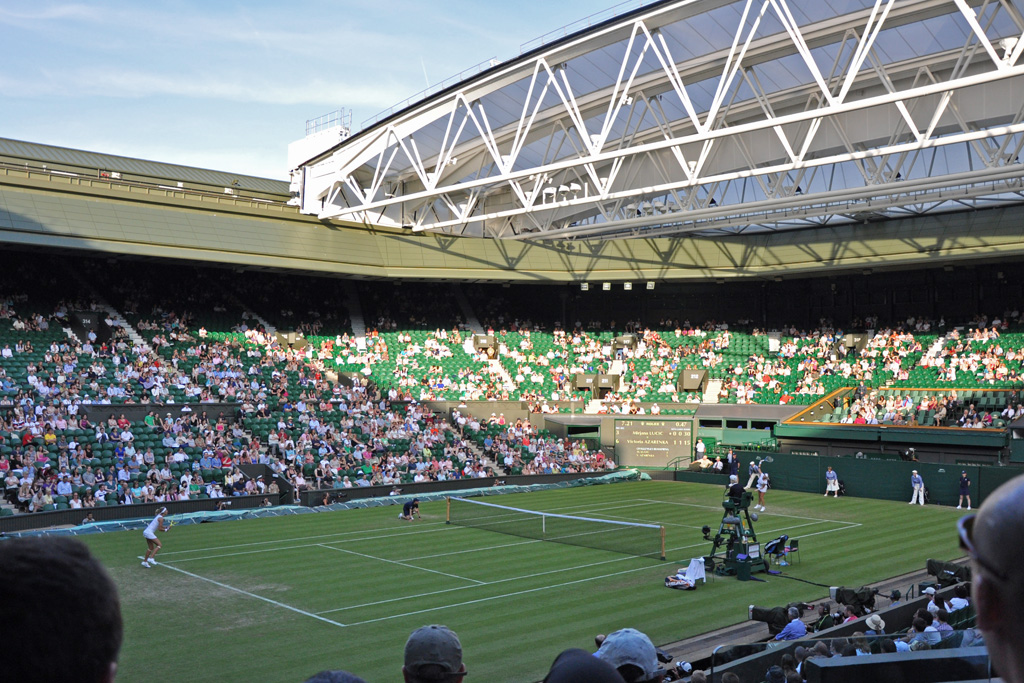
Centre Court, where the finals of Wimbledon took place.

The 2019 Wimbledon Championships was the 133rd edition of the tournament and was held at All England Lawn Tennis and Croquet Club in London. It was also the last regular tennis tournament to be staged before the cancellation was confirmed in 2020, due to the COVID-19 pandemic, the first such cancellation since World War II.

The tournament was run by the International Tennis Federation (ITF) and was included in the 2019 ATP Tour and the 2019 WTA Tour calendars under the Grand Slam category. The tournament consisted of men's (singles and doubles), women's (singles and doubles), mixed doubles, boys (under 18 – singles and doubles) and girls (under 18 – singles and doubles), which was also a part of the Grade A category of tournaments for under 18, and singles & doubles events for men's and women's wheelchair tennis players as part of the UNIQLO Tour under the Grand Slam category, also hosting singles and doubles events for wheelchair quad tennis for the first time.

The tournament was played only on grass courts; main draw matches were played at the All England Lawn Tennis and Croquet Club, Wimbledon. Qualifying matches were played, from Monday 24 June to Thursday 27 June 2019, at the Bank of England Sports Ground, Roehampton. The Tennis Sub-Committee met to decide wild card entries on 17 June.

== Singles players ==
=== Gentlemen's singles ===
Champion		Runner-up	
(Serbia) Novak Djokovic [1]		(Switzerland) Roger Federer [2]	
Semifinals out
(Spain) Roberto Bautista Agut [23]		(Spain) Rafael Nadal [3]	
Quarterfinals out
(Belgium) David Goffin [21]	(Argentina) Guido Pella [26]	(United States) Sam Querrey	(Japan) Kei Nishikori [8]
4th round out
(France) Ugo Humbert	(Spain) Fernando Verdasco	(Canada) Milos Raonic [15]	(France) Benoît Paire [28]
(United States) Tennys Sandgren	(Portugal) João Sousa	(Kazakhstan) Mikhail Kukushkin	(Italy) Matteo Berrettini [17]
3rd round out
(Poland) Hubert Hurkacz	(Canada) Félix Auger-Aliassime [19]	(Russia) Daniil Medvedev [11]	(Italy) Thomas Fabbiano
(South Africa) Kevin Anderson [4]	(United States) Reilly Opelka	(Russia) Karen Khachanov [10]	(Czech Republic) Jiří Veselý [Q]
(Australia) John Millman	(Italy) Fabio Fognini [12]	(United Kingdom) Dan Evans	(France) Jo-Wilfried Tsonga
(United States) Steve Johnson	(Germany) Jan-Lennard Struff [33]	(Argentina) Diego Schwartzman [24]	(France) Lucas Pouille [27]
2nd round out
(United States) Denis Kudla	(Argentina) Leonardo Mayer	(France) Corentin Moutet (Q)	(Spain) Marcel Granollers (Q)
(Australia) Alexei Popyrin (Q)	(France) Jérémy Chardy	(United Kingdom) Kyle Edmund [30]	(Croatia) Ivo Karlović
(Serbia) Janko Tipsarević (PR)	(Italy) Andreas Seppi	(Switzerland) Stan Wawrinka [22]	(Netherlands) Robin Haase
(Spain) Feliciano López (WC)	(Belgium) Steve Darcis (PR)	(Serbia) Miomir Kecmanović	(Uruguay) Pablo Cuevas
(Russia) Andrey Rublev	(Serbia) Laslo Đere [31]	(France) Gilles Simon [20]	(Hungary) Márton Fucsovics
(Croatia) Marin Čilić [13]	(Georgia (country)) Nikoloz Basilashvili [18]	(Lithuania) Ričardas Berankis	(Australia) Nick Kyrgios
(United Kingdom) Cameron Norrie	(Australia) Alex de Minaur [25]	(United States) Taylor Fritz	(United States) John Isner [9]
(Cyprus) Marcos Baghdatis (WC)	(Germany) Dominik Köpfer (WC)	(France) Grégoire Barrère (Q)	(United Kingdom) Jay Clarke (WC)
1st round out
(Germany) Philipp Kohlschreiber	(Tunisia) Malek Jaziri	(Latvia) Ernests Gulbis	(Serbia) Dušan Lajović [32]
(Canada) Vasek Pospisil (PR)	(Bulgaria) Grigor Dimitrov	(Italy) Lorenzo Sonego	(France) Gaël Monfils [16]
(Italy) Paolo Lorenzi	(Spain) Pablo Carreño Busta	(Slovakia) Martin Kližan	(United States) Bradley Klahn
(Spain) Jaume Munar	(Poland) Kamil Majchrzak (Q)	(Italy) Andrea Arnaboldi (Q)	(Greece) Stefanos Tsitsipas [7]
(France) Pierre-Hugues Herbert	(Japan) Yoshihito Nishioka	(Chile) Nicolás Jarry	(Romania) Marius Copil
(Belgium) Ruben Bemelmans (Q)	(Germany) Cedrik-Marcel Stebe (PR)	(Slovakia) Jozef Kovalík (PR)	(India) Prajnesh Gunneswaran
(South Korea) Kwon Soon-woo (Q)	(United States) Marcos Giron (Q)	(Germany) Mischa Zverev	(Germany) Peter Gojowczyk
(Argentina) Juan Ignacio Londero	(Spain) Roberto Carballés Baena	(Bosnia and Herzegovina) Damir Džumhur	(Germany) Alexander Zverev [6]
(Austria) Dominic Thiem [5]	(Chile) Cristian Garín	(Bolivia) Hugo Dellien	(Argentina) Guido Andreozzi
(Italy) Salvatore Caruso (Q)	(Japan) Yasutaka Uchiyama (Q)	(Austria) Dennis Novak (Q)	(United States) Frances Tiafoe
(France) Adrian Mannarino	(United Kingdom) Paul Jubb (WC)	(Argentina) Federico Delbonis	(United Kingdom) James Ward (WC)
(Canada) Denis Shapovalov [29]	(Australia) Bernard Tomic	(Australia) Jordan Thompson	(Japan) Yūichi Sugita (Q)
(Brazil) Thiago Monteiro (Q)	(Uzbekistan) Denis Istomin	(Spain) Albert Ramos Viñolas	(Italy) Marco Cecchinato
(Moldova) Radu Albot	(Czech Republic) Tomáš Berdych (PR)	(Spain) Pablo Andújar	(Norway) Casper Ruud
(Slovenia) Aljaž Bedene	(Canada) Brayden Schnur (LL)	(Serbia) Filip Krajinović	(Australia) Matthew Ebden
(France) Richard Gasquet	(Kazakhstan) Alexander Bublik	(United States) Noah Rubin (Q)	(South Africa) Lloyd Harris

=== Ladies' singles ===
Champion		Runner-up	
(Romania) Simona Halep [7]		(United States) Serena Williams [11]	
Semifinals out
(Czech Republic) Barbora Strýcová		(Ukraine) Elina Svitolina [8]	
Quarterfinals out
(United States) Alison Riske	(United Kingdom) Johanna Konta [19]	(Czech Republic) Karolína Muchová	(China) Zhang Shuai
4th round out
(Australia) Ashleigh Barty [1]	(Spain) Carla Suárez Navarro [30]	(Belgium) Elise Mertens [21]	(Czech Republic) Petra Kvitová [6]
(Croatia) Petra Martić [24]	(Czech Republic) Karolína Plíšková [3]	(United States) Coco Gauff (Q)	(Ukraine) Dayana Yastremska
3rd round out
(United Kingdom) Harriet Dart (WC)	(Switzerland) Belinda Bencic [13]	(Germany) Julia Görges [18]	(United States) Lauren Davis (LL)
(Netherlands) Kiki Bertens [4]	(China) Wang Qiang [15]	(United States) Sloane Stephens [9]	(Poland) Magda Linette
(Greece) Maria Sakkari [31]	(United States) Danielle Collins	(Estonia) Anett Kontaveit [20]	(Chinese Taipei) Hsieh Su-wei [28]
(Belarus) Victoria Azarenka	(Slovenia) Polona Hercog	(Denmark) Caroline Wozniacki [14]	(Switzerland) Viktorija Golubic
2nd round out
(Belgium) Alison Van Uytvanck	(Brazil) Beatriz Haddad Maia (Q)	(Serbia) Ivana Jorović	(Estonia) Kaia Kanepi
(Slovenia) Kaja Juvan (Q)	(Russia) Varvara Flink (Q)	(France) Pauline Parmentier	(Germany) Angelique Kerber [5]
(United States) Taylor Townsend	(Germany) Laura Siegemund	(Romania) Monica Niculescu (WC)	(Slovenia) Tamara Zidanšek
(China) Wang Yafan	(Czech Republic) Kateřina Siniaková	(United States) Amanda Anisimova [25]	(France) Kristina Mladenovic
(Russia) Margarita Gasparyan	(Czech Republic) Marie Bouzková (LL)	(Russia) Anastasia Potapova	(Latvia) Anastasija Sevastova [12]
(United States) Madison Brengle	(United Kingdom) Heather Watson	(Belgium) Kirsten Flipkens	(Puerto Rico) Monica Puig
(Romania) Mihaela Buzărnescu	(Australia) Ajla Tomljanović	(United States) Madison Keys [17]	(Slovakia) Magdaléna Rybáriková
(Russia) Veronika Kudermetova	(Belgium) Yanina Wickmayer (Q)	(United States) Sofia Kenin [27]	(Kazakhstan) Yulia Putintseva
1st round out
(China) Zheng Saisai	(Russia) Svetlana Kuznetsova	(United States) Christina McHale (LL)	(Spain) Garbiñe Muguruza [26]
(Croatia) Donna Vekić [22]	(Netherlands) Lesley Kerkhove (Q)	(Switzerland) Stefanie Vögele	(Russia) Anastasia Pavlyuchenkova
(Italy) Giulia Gatto-Monticone (Q)	(Czech Republic) Kristýna Plíšková	(Spain) Paula Badosa (Q)	(Romania) Elena-Gabriela Ruse (Q)
(Australia) Samantha Stosur	(Russia) Maria Sharapova	(Ukraine) Kateryna Kozlova	(Germany) Tatjana Maria
(Luxembourg) Mandy Minella	(Australia) Arina Rodionova (Q)	(United Kingdom) Katie Swan (WC)	(Ukraine) Lesia Tsurenko [32]
(France) Fiona Ferro	(Germany) Andrea Petkovic	(Canada) Eugenie Bouchard	(Belarus) Vera Lapko
(Switzerland) Timea Bacsinszky	(Czech Republic) Tereza Martincová (Q)	(Russia) Ekaterina Alexandrova	(Romania) Ana Bogdan (Q)
(Romania) Sorana Cîrstea	(Russia) Anna Kalinskaya (Q)	(Russia) Vitalia Diatchenko	(Tunisia) Ons Jabeur
(Australia) Daria Gavrilova	(Germany) Anna-Lena Friedsam (PR)	(Germany) Mona Barthel	(United States) Bernarda Pera
(United States) Jennifer Brady	(Switzerland) Jil Teichmann	(Kazakhstan) Zarina Diyas	(United States) Kristie Ahn (Q)
(Czech Republic) Markéta Vondroušová [16]	(Serbia) Aleksandra Krunić	(United States) Caty McNally (Q)	(United States) Shelby Rogers (PR)
(Latvia) Jeļena Ostapenko	(Slovenia) Dalila Jakupović	(Slovakia) Anna Karolína Schmiedlová	(China) Zhu Lin
(Belarus) Aliaksandra Sasnovich	(United States) Jessica Pegula	(France) Alizé Cornet	(Russia) Daria Kasatkina [29]
(Thailand) Luksika Kumkhum	(Slovakia) Viktória Kužmová	(United States) Venus Williams	(Belarus) Aryna Sabalenka [10]
(Spain) Sara Sorribes Tormo	(Belgium) Ysaline Bonaventure (Q)	(Sweden) Rebecca Peterson	(France) Caroline Garcia [23]
(Australia) Astra Sharma	(Italy) Camila Giorgi	(Poland) Iga Świątek	(Japan) Naomi Osaka [2]

== Events ==
=== Gentlemen's singles ===
- (Serbia) Novak Djokovic def. (Switzerland) Roger Federer, 7–6^{(7–5)}, 1–6, 7–6^{(7–4)}, 4–6, 13–12^{(7–3)}

=== Ladies' singles ===
- (Romania) Simona Halep def. (United States) Serena Williams, 6–2, 6–2

=== Gentlemen's doubles ===
- (Colombia) Juan Sebastián Cabal / (Colombia) Robert Farah def. (France) Nicolas Mahut / (France) Édouard Roger-Vasselin, 6–7^{(5–7)}, 7–6^{(7–5)}, 7–6^{(8–6)}, 6–7^{(5–7)}, 6–3

=== Ladies' doubles ===
- (Chinese Taipei) Hsieh Su-wei / (Czech Republic) Barbora Strýcová def. (Canada) Gabriela Dabrowski / (China) Xu Yifan, 6–2, 6–4

=== Mixed doubles ===
- (Croatia) Ivan Dodig / (Chinese Taipei) Latisha Chan def. (Sweden) Robert Lindstedt / (Latvia) Jeļena Ostapenko, 6–2, 6–3

=== Wheelchair gentlemen's singles ===
- (Argentina) Gustavo Fernández def. (Japan) Shingo Kunieda, 4–6, 6–3, 6–2

=== Wheelchair ladies' singles ===
- (Netherlands) Aniek van Koot def. (Netherlands) Diede de Groot, 6–4, 4–6, 7–5

=== Wheelchair quad singles ===
- (Australia) Dylan Alcott def. (United Kingdom) Andrew Lapthorne, 6−0, 6−2

=== Wheelchair gentlemen's doubles ===
- (Belgium) Joachim Gérard / (Sweden) Stefan Olsson def. (United Kingdom) Alfie Hewett / (United Kingdom) Gordon Reid, 6−4, 6−2

=== Wheelchair ladies' doubles ===
- (Netherlands) Diede de Groot / (Netherlands) Aniek van Koot def. (Netherlands) Marjolein Buis / (Italy) Giulia Capocci, 6−1, 6−1

=== Wheelchair quad doubles ===
- (Australia) Dylan Alcott / (United Kingdom) Andrew Lapthorne def. (Japan) Koji Sugeno / (United States) David Wagner, 6–2, 7–6^{(7–4)}

=== Boys' singles ===
- (Japan) Shintaro Mochizuki def. (Spain) Carlos Gimeno Valero, 6–3, 6–2

=== Girls' singles ===
- (Ukraine) Daria Snigur def. (United States) Alexa Noel, 6−4, 6−4

=== Boys' doubles ===
- (Czech Republic) Jonáš Forejtek / (Czech Republic) Jiří Lehečka def. (Canada) Liam Draxl / (United States) Govind Nanda, 7−5, 6−4

=== Girls' doubles ===
- (United States) Savannah Broadus / (United States) Abigail Forbes def. (Latvia) Kamilla Bartone / (Russia) Oksana Selekhmeteva, 7–5, 5–7, 6–2

=== Gentlemen's invitation doubles ===
- (France) Arnaud Clément / (France) Michaël Llodra def. (Belgium) Xavier Malisse / (Belarus) Max Mirnyi, 6–3, 1–6, [10–7]

=== Ladies' invitation doubles ===
- (Zimbabwe) Cara Black / (United States) Martina Navratilova def. (France) Marion Bartoli / (Slovakia) Daniela Hantuchová, 6–0, 3–6, [10–8]

=== Senior gentlemen's invitation doubles ===
- (Sweden) Jonas Björkman / (Australia) Todd Woodbridge def. (Netherlands) Jacco Eltingh / (Netherlands) Paul Haarhuis, 4−6, 6−3, [10−6]

== Singles seeds ==
=== Gentlemen's singles ===
Seeds are adjusted on a surface-based system to reflect more accurately the individual player's grass court achievement as per the following formula, which applies to the top 32 players according to the ATP rankings on 24 June 2019:

- Take Entry System Position points at 24 June 2019.
- Add 100% points earned for all grass court tournaments in the past 12 months (25 June 2018 – 23 June 2019).
- Add 75% points earned for best grass court tournament in the 12 months before that (26 June 2017 – 24 June 2018).

Rank and points before are as of 1 July 2019.

Seed	Rank	Player	Points before	Points defending	Points won	Points after	Status
1	1	(Serbia) Novak Djokovic	12,415	2,000	2,000	12,415	Champion, defeated (Switzerland) Roger Federer [2]
2	3	(Switzerland) Roger Federer	6,620	360	1,200	7,460	Runner-up, lost to (Serbia) Novak Djokovic [1]
3	2	(Spain) Rafael Nadal	7,945	720	720	7,945	Semifinals lost to (Switzerland) Roger Federer [2]
4	8	(South Africa) Kevin Anderson	3,610	1,200	90	2,500	Third round lost to (Argentina) Guido Pella [26]
5	4	(Austria) Dominic Thiem	4,595	10	10	4,595	First round lost to (United States) Sam Querrey
6	5	(Germany) Alexander Zverev	4,405	90	10	4,325	First round lost to (Czech Republic) Jiří Veselý [Q]
7	6	(Greece) Stefanos Tsitsipas	4,215	180	10	4,045	First round lost to (Italy) Thomas Fabbiano
8	7	(Japan) Kei Nishikori	4,040	360	360	4,040	Quarterfinals lost to (Switzerland) Roger Federer [2]
9	12	(United States) John Isner	2,715	720	45	2,040	Second round lost to (Kazakhstan) Mikhail Kukushkin
10	9	(Russia) Karen Khachanov	2,980	180	90	2,890	Third round lost to (Spain) Roberto Bautista Agut [23]
11	13	(Russia) Daniil Medvedev	2,625	90	90	2,625	Third round lost to (Belgium) David Goffin [21]
12	10	(Italy) Fabio Fognini	2,785	90	90	2,785	Third round lost to (United States) Tennys Sandgren
13	18	(Croatia) Marin Čilić	1,940	45	45	1,940	Second round lost to (Portugal) João Sousa
~~14~~	~~14~~	~~(Croatia) Borna Ćorić~~	2,205	10	0	2,195	Withdrew due to a back injury
15	17	(Canada) Milos Raonic	1,945	360	180	1,765	Fourth round lost to (Argentina) Guido Pella [26]
16	15	(France) Gaël Monfils	1,985	180	10	1,815	First round, retired against (France) Ugo Humbert
17	20	(Italy) Matteo Berrettini	1,665	45	180	1,800	Fourth round lost to (Switzerland) Roger Federer [2]
18	16	(Georgia (country)) Nikoloz Basilashvili	1,960	10	45	1,995	Second round lost to (United Kingdom) Dan Evans
19	21	(Canada) Félix Auger-Aliassime	1,654	(29)^{†}	90	1,715	Third round lost to (France) Ugo Humbert
20	25	(France) Gilles Simon	1,445	180	45	1,310	Second round lost to (United States) Tennys Sandgren
21	23	(Belgium) David Goffin	1,510	10	360	1,860	Quarterfinals lost to (Serbia) Novak Djokovic [1]
22	19	(Switzerland) Stan Wawrinka	1,715	45	45	1,715	Second round lost to (United States) Reilly Opelka
23	22	(Spain) Roberto Bautista Agut	1,600	0	720	2,320	Semifinals lost to (Serbia) Novak Djokovic [1]
24	24	(Argentina) Diego Schwartzman	1,485	45	90	1,530	Third round lost to (Italy) Matteo Berrettini [17]
25	29	(Australia) Alex de Minaur	1,330	90	45	1,285	Second round lost to (United States) Steve Johnson
26	26	(Argentina) Guido Pella	1,430	90	360	1,700	Quarterfinals lost to (Spain) Roberto Bautista Agut [23]
27	28	(France) Lucas Pouille	1,340	45	90	1,385	Third round lost to (Switzerland) Roger Federer [2]
28	32	(France) Benoît Paire	1,278	90	180	1,368	Fourth round lost to (Spain) Roberto Bautista Agut [23]
29	27	(Canada) Denis Shapovalov	1,390	45	10	1,355	First round lost to (Lithuania) Ričardas Berankis
30	30	(United Kingdom) Kyle Edmund	1,325	90	45	1,280	Second round lost to (Spain) Fernando Verdasco
31	35	(Serbia) Laslo Đere	1,255	10	45	1,290	Second round lost to (Australia) John Millman
32	36	(Serbia) Dušan Lajović	1,251	10	10	1,251	First round lost to (Poland) Hubert Hurkacz
33	33	(Germany) Jan-Lennard Struff	1,265	90	90	1,265	Third round lost to (Kazakhstan) Mikhail Kukushkin

† The player did not qualify for the tournament in 2018, but is defending points from an ATP Challenger Tour tournament.

The following player would have been seeded, but withdrew before the event.

Rank	Player	Points before	Points defending	Points after	Withdrawal reason
11	(Argentina) Juan Martín del Potro	2,740	360	2,380	Right knee injury

=== Ladies' singles ===
The seeds for ladies' singles are based on the WTA rankings as of 24 June 2019. Rank and points before are as of 1 July 2019.

Seed	Rank	Player	Points before	Points defending	Points won	Points after	Status
1	1	(Australia) Ashleigh Barty	6,495	130	240	6,605	Fourth round lost to (United States) Alison Riske
2	2	(Japan) Naomi Osaka	6,377	130	10	6,257	First round lost to (Kazakhstan) Yulia Putintseva
3	3	(Czech Republic) Karolína Plíšková	6,055	240	240	6,055	Fourth round lost to (Czech Republic) Karolína Muchová
4	4	(Netherlands) Kiki Bertens	5,430	430	130	5,130	Third round lost to (Czech Republic) Barbora Strýcová
5	5	(Germany) Angelique Kerber	4,805	2,000	70	2,875	Second round lost to (United States) Lauren Davis [LL]
6	6	(Czech Republic) Petra Kvitová	4,555	10	240	4,785	Fourth round lost to (United Kingdom) Johanna Konta [19]
7	7	(Romania) Simona Halep	4,063	130	2,000	5,933	Champion, defeated (United States) Serena Williams [11]
8	8	(Ukraine) Elina Svitolina	3,868	10	780	4,638	Semifinals lost to (Romania) Simona Halep [7]
9	9	(United States) Sloane Stephens	3,682	10	130	3,802	Third round lost to (United Kingdom) Johanna Konta [19]
10	11	(Belarus) Aryna Sabalenka	3,365	10	10	3,365	First round lost to (Slovakia) Magdaléna Rybáriková
11	10	(United States) Serena Williams	3,411	1,300	1,300	3,411	Runner-up, lost to (Romania) Simona Halep [7]
12	12	(Latvia) Anastasija Sevastova	3,296	10	70	3,356	Second round lost to (United States) Danielle Collins
13	13	(Switzerland) Belinda Bencic	3,073	240	130	2,963	Third round lost to (United States) Alison Riske
14	19	(Denmark) Caroline Wozniacki	2,418	70	130	2,478	Third round lost to (China) Zhang Shuai
15	15	(China) Wang Qiang	2,752	10	130	2,872	Third round lost to (Belgium) Elise Mertens [21]
16	14	(Czech Republic) Markéta Vondroušová	2,775	10+13	10+0	2,762	First round lost to (United States) Madison Brengle
17	16	(United States) Madison Keys	2,615	130	70	2,555	Second round lost to (Slovenia) Polona Hercog
18	17	(Germany) Julia Görges	2,605	780	130	1,955	Third round lost to (United States) Serena Williams [11]
19	18	(United Kingdom) Johanna Konta	2,430	70	430	2,790	Quarterfinals lost to (Czech Republic) Barbora Strýcová
20	20	(Estonia) Anett Kontaveit	2,335	130	130	2,335	Third round lost to (Czech Republic) Karolína Muchová
21	21	(Belgium) Elise Mertens	2,195	130	240	2,305	Fourth round lost to (Czech Republic) Barbora Strýcová
22	22	(Croatia) Donna Vekić	2,180	240	10	1,950	First round lost to (United States) Alison Riske
23	23	(France) Caroline Garcia	2,105	10	10	2,105	First round lost to (China) Zhang Shuai
24	24	(Croatia) Petra Martić	2,105	10	240	2,335	Fourth round lost to (Ukraine) Elina Svitolina [8]
25	26	(United States) Amanda Anisimova	1,949	(1)^{†}	70	2,018	Second round lost to (Poland) Magda Linette
26	27	(Spain) Garbiñe Muguruza	1,925	70	10	1,865	First round lost to (Brazil) Beatriz Haddad Maia [Q]
27	28	(United States) Sofia Kenin	1,895	70	70	1,895	Second round lost to (Ukraine) Dayana Yastremska
28	29	(Chinese Taipei) Hsieh Su-wei	1,885	240	130	1,775	Third round lost to (Czech Republic) Karolína Plíšková [3]
29	30	(Russia) Daria Kasatkina	1,745	430	10	1,325	First round lost to (Australia) Ajla Tomljanović
30	31	(Spain) Carla Suárez Navarro	1,732	130	240	1,842	Fourth round lost to (United States) Serena Williams [11]
31	32	(Greece) Maria Sakkari	1,670	10	130	1,790	Third round lost to (Ukraine) Elina Svitolina [8]
32	33	(Ukraine) Lesia Tsurenko	1,616	70	10	1,556	First round lost to (Czech Republic) Barbora Strýcová

† The player did not qualify for the tournament in 2018. Accordingly, points for her 16th best result are deducted instead.

The following player would have been seeded, but withdrew from the event.

Rank	Player	Points before	Points defending	Points after	Withdrawal reason
25	(Canada) Bianca Andreescu	1,996	30	1,966	Right shoulder injury

== Doubles seeds ==
=== Gentlemen's doubles ===
Team		Rank^{1}	Seed
(Poland) Łukasz Kubot	(Brazil) Marcelo Melo	6	1
(Colombia) Juan Sebastián Cabal	(Colombia) Robert Farah	10	2
(South Africa) Raven Klaasen	(New Zealand) Michael Venus	19	3
(Croatia) Mate Pavić	(Brazil) Bruno Soares	23	4
(Netherlands) Jean-Julien Rojer	(Romania) Horia Tecău	31	5
(Croatia) Nikola Mektić	(Croatia) Franko Škugor	31	6
(United States) Bob Bryan	(United States) Mike Bryan	33	7
(Finland) Henri Kontinen	(Australia) John Peers	37	8
(Argentina) Máximo González	(Argentina) Horacio Zeballos	39	9
(United Kingdom) Jamie Murray	(United Kingdom) Neal Skupski	39	10
(France) Nicolas Mahut	(France) Édouard Roger-Vasselin	43	11
(United States) Rajeev Ram	(United Kingdom) Joe Salisbury	44	12
(Germany) Kevin Krawietz	(Germany) Andreas Mies	47	13
(Austria) Oliver Marach	(Austria) Jürgen Melzer	66	14
(United Kingdom) Dominic Inglot	(United States) Austin Krajicek	73	15
(Netherlands) Robin Haase	(Denmark) Frederik Nielsen	74	16

- ^{1} Rankings are as of 24 June 2019.

=== Ladies' doubles ===
Team		Rank^{1}	Seed
(Hungary) Tímea Babos	(France) Kristina Mladenovic	3	1
(Czech Republic) Barbora Krejčíková	(Czech Republic) Kateřina Siniaková	10	2
(Chinese Taipei) Hsieh Su-wei	(Czech Republic) Barbora Strýcová	19	3
(Canada) Gabriela Dabrowski	(China) Xu Yifan	20	4
(Australia) Samantha Stosur	(China) Zhang Shuai	21	5
(Belgium) Elise Mertens	(Belarus) Aryna Sabalenka	24	6
(United States) Nicole Melichar	(Czech Republic) Květa Peschke	27	7
(Germany) Anna-Lena Grönefeld	(Netherlands) Demi Schuurs	30	8
(Chinese Taipei) Chan Hao-ching	(Chinese Taipei) Latisha Chan	36	9
(Belarus) Victoria Azarenka	(Australia) Ashleigh Barty	40	10
(Czech Republic) Lucie Hradecká	(Slovenia) Andreja Klepač	44	11
(Belgium) Kirsten Flipkens	(Sweden) Johanna Larsson	54	12
(China) Duan Yingying	(China) Zheng Saisai	63	13
(Russia) Veronika Kudermetova	(Latvia) Jeļena Ostapenko	66	14
(Romania) Irina-Camelia Begu	(Romania) Monica Niculescu	78	15
(United States) Raquel Atawo	(Ukraine) Lyudmyla Kichenok	79	16

- ^{1} Rankings are as of 24 June 2019.

=== Mixed doubles ===
Team		Rank^{1}	Seed
(Brazil) Bruno Soares	(United States) Nicole Melichar	22	1
(Netherlands) Jean-Julien Rojer	(Netherlands) Demi Schuurs	22	2
(Croatia) Mate Pavić	(Canada) Gabriela Dabrowski	29	3
(Australia) John Peers	(China) Zhang Shuai	31	4
(Netherlands) Wesley Koolhof	(Czech Republic) Květa Peschke	38	5
(Croatia) Nikola Mektić	(Poland) Alicja Rosolska	38	6
~~(Argentina) Máximo González~~	~~(China) Xu Yifan~~	~~39~~	~~7~~
(Croatia) Ivan Dodig	(Chinese Taipei) Latisha Chan	49	8
(United Kingdom) Neal Skupski	(Chinese Taipei) Chan Hao-ching	51	9
(New Zealand) Michael Venus	(Slovenia) Katarina Srebotnik	55	10
(France) Édouard Roger-Vasselin	(Slovenia) Andreja Klepač	55	11
(Croatia) Franko Škugor	(Romania) Raluca Olaru	59	12
(India) Rohan Bopanna	(Belarus) Aryna Sabalenka	67	13
(France) Fabrice Martin	(United States) Raquel Atawo	68	14
~~(Czech Republic) Roman Jebavý~~	~~(Czech Republic) Lucie Hradecká~~	~~72~~	~~15~~
(India) Divij Sharan	(China) Duan Yingying	72	16

- ^{1} Rankings are as of 1 July 2019.

== Point distribution and prize money ==
=== Point distribution ===
Below is the tables with the point distribution for each phase of the tournament.

==== Senior points ====
Event	W	F	SF	QF	Round of 16	Round of 32	Round of 64	Round of 128	Q	Q3	Q2	Q1
Men's singles	2000	1200	720	360	180	90	45	10	25	16	8	0
Men's doubles	2000	1200	720	360	180	90	0	—	25	—	0	0
Women's singles	2000	1300	780	430	240	130	70	10	40	30	20	2
Women's doubles	2000	1300	780	430	240	130	10	—	—	—	—	—

==== Wheelchair points ====
Event	W	F	3rd	4th
Singles	800	500	375	100
Doubles	800	500	100	—

==== Junior points ====
Event	W	F	SF	QF	Round of 16	Round of 32	Q	Q3
Boys' singles	1000	600	370	200	100	45	30	20
Girls' singles	1000	600	370	200	100	45	30	20
Boys' doubles	750	450	275	150	75	—	—	—
Girls' doubles	750	450	275	150	75	—	—	—

==== Prize money ====
The total prize money on offer has increased for the eighth year in a row. Winners of the tournament will get the largest share of the £38m pot, up from £34m last year (+11.8%).

Event	W	F	SF	QF	Round of 16 (R4)	Round of 32 (R3)	Round of 64 (R2)	Round of 128 (R1)	Q3	Q2	Q1
Singles	£2,350,000	£1,175,000	£588,000	£294,000	£176,000	£111,000	£72,000	£45,000	£22,500	£13,250	£7,000
Doubles*	£540,000	£270,000	£135,000	£67,000	£32,000	£19,000	£12,000	—	—	—	—
Mixed doubles*	£116,000	£58,000	£29,000	£14,500	£7,000	£3,500	£1,750	—	—	—	—
Wheelchair singles	£46,000	£23,000	£15,000	£10,000	—	—	—	—	—	—	—
Wheelchair doubles*	£18,000	£9,000	£5,000	—	—	—	—	—	—	—	—
Invitation doubles	£27,000	£23,000	£20,000	—	—	—	—	—	—	—	—

_{* per team}

== Main draw wildcard entries ==
The following players will receive wild cards into the main draw senior events.

=== Gentlemen's singles ===
- (Cyprus) Marcos Baghdatis
- (United Kingdom) Jay Clarke
- (United Kingdom) Paul Jubb
- (Germany) Dominik Köpfer
- (Spain) Feliciano López
- (United Kingdom) James Ward

=== Ladies' singles ===
- (United Kingdom) Harriet Dart
- (Romania) Monica Niculescu
- (United Kingdom) Katie Swan

=== Gentlemen's doubles ===
- (United Kingdom) Liam Broady / (United Kingdom) Scott Clayton
- (United Kingdom) Jay Clarke / (United Kingdom) James Ward
- (United Kingdom) Jack Draper / (United Kingdom) Paul Jubb
- (United Kingdom) Dan Evans / (United Kingdom) Lloyd Glasspool
- (Australia) Lleyton Hewitt / (Australia) Jordan Thompson
- (United Kingdom) Evan Hoyt / (United Kingdom) Luke Johnson

=== Ladies' doubles ===
- (United Kingdom) Naiktha Bains / (United Kingdom) Naomi Broady
- (United Kingdom) Freya Christie / (United Kingdom) Katie Swan
- (United Kingdom) Harriet Dart / (United Kingdom) Katy Dunne
- (United Kingdom) Sarah Beth Grey / (United Kingdom) Eden Silva

=== Mixed doubles ===
- (United Kingdom) Jay Clarke / (United States) Coco Gauff
- (United Kingdom) Scott Clayton / (United Kingdom) Sarah Beth Grey
- (United Kingdom) Evan Hoyt / (United Kingdom) Eden Silva
- (United Kingdom) Jonny O'Mara / (United Kingdom) Naomi Broady
- (United Kingdom) Joe Salisbury / (United Kingdom) Katy Dunne

== Main draw qualifier entries ==
=== Gentlemen's singles ===
1. (France) Corentin Moutet
2. (Japan) Yasutaka Uchiyama
3. (Italy) Andrea Arnaboldi
4. (Australia) Alexei Popyrin
5. (South Korea) Kwon Soon-woo
6. (Brazil) Thiago Monteiro
7. (Czech Republic) Jiří Veselý
8. (Italy) Salvatore Caruso
9. (Spain) Marcel Granollers
10. (United States) Marcos Giron
11. (Poland) Kamil Majchrzak
12. (France) Grégoire Barrère
13. (United States) Noah Rubin
14. (Austria) Dennis Novak
15. (Japan) Yūichi Sugita
16. (Belgium) Ruben Bemelmans

Lucky loser

1. (Canada) Brayden Schnur

=== Ladies' singles ===
1. (United States) Cori Gauff
2. (Czech Republic) Tereza Martincová
3. (United States) Kristie Ahn
4. (Australia) Arina Rodionova
5. (Russia) Anna Kalinskaya
6. (Slovenia) Kaja Juvan
7. (United States) Caty McNally
8. (Russia) Varvara Flink
9. (Spain) Paula Badosa
10. (Italy) Giulia Gatto-Monticone
11. (Romania) Elena-Gabriela Ruse
12. (Belgium) Ysaline Bonaventure
13. (Romania) Ana Bogdan
14. (Brazil) Beatriz Haddad Maia
15. (Netherlands) Lesley Kerkhove
16. (Belgium) Yanina Wickmayer

Lucky losers

1. (Czech Republic) Marie Bouzková
2. (United States) Lauren Davis
3. (United States) Christina McHale

== Protected ranking ==
The following players were accepted directly into the main draw using a protected ranking:

Gentlemen's Singles

- (Czech Republic) Tomáš Berdych (57)
- (Canada) Vasek Pospisil (73)
- (Slovakia) Jozef Kovalík (85)
- (Serbia) Janko Tipsarević (88)
- (Belgium) Steve Darcis (90)
- (Germany) Cedrik-Marcel Stebe (95)

Ladies' Singles

- (Germany) Anna-Lena Friedsam (50)
- (United States) Shelby Rogers (81)

== Withdrawals ==
The following players were accepted directly into the main tournament but withdrew with injuries or other reasons:

Gentlemen's Singles

- ‡ (Argentina) Juan Martín del Potro (9) → replaced by (Italy) Paolo Lorenzi (99)
- ‡ (United States) Mackenzie McDonald (65) → replaced by (Uzbekistan) Denis Istomin (101)
- § (Croatia) Borna Ćorić (15) → replaced by (Canada) Brayden Schnur (LL)

Ladies' Singles

- ‡ (Russia) Ekaterina Makarova (91) → replaced by (Russia) Svetlana Kuznetsova (102)
- ‡ (United States) CoCo Vandeweghe (100 PR) → replaced by (Serbia) Ivana Jorović (103)
- ‡ (Canada) Bianca Andreescu (22) → replaced by (Czech Republic) Kristýna Plíšková (109)
- † (Slovakia) Dominika Cibulková (35) → replaced by (Czech Republic) Marie Bouzková (LL)
- † (Russia) Evgeniya Rodina (67) → replaced by (United States) Lauren Davis (LL)
- † (Russia) Vera Zvonareva (78) → replaced by (United States) Christina McHale (LL)

‡ – withdrew from entry list before qualifying began
† – withdrew from entry list after qualifying began
§ – withdrew from main draw

Preceded by 2019 French Open	Grand Slam Tournaments	Succeeded by 2019 US Open
Preceded by 2018 Wimbledon Championships	The Championships, Wimbledon	Succeeded by 2021 Wimbledon Championships; 2020 edition cancelled
