= 2019 Wimbledon Championships – Men's doubles =

Men's doubles
- 2019 Wimbledon Championships

Final
- Champions: (Colombia) Juan Sebastián Cabal (Colombia) Robert Farah
- Runners-up: (France) Nicolas Mahut (France) Édouard Roger-Vasselin
- Score: 6–7^{(5–7)}, 7–6^{(7–5)}, 7–6^{(8–6)}, 6–7^{(5–7)}, 6–3

Events
Singles	men	women		boys	girls
Doubles	men	women	mixed	boys	girls
WC Singles	men	women	quad
WC Doubles	men	women	quad
Legends	men	women	seniors
← 2018 ·	Wimbledon Championships	· 2021 →

Juan Sebastián Cabal and Robert Farah defeated Nicolas Mahut and Édouard Roger-Vasselin in the final, 6–7^{(5–7)}, 7–6^{(7–5)}, 7–6^{(8–6)}, 6–7^{(5–7)}, 6–3 to win the men's doubles tennis title at the 2019 Wimbledon Championships. Cabal and Farah saved five match points en route to the title, against Jean-Julien Rojer and Horia Tecău in the quarterfinals. With the win, they jointly attained the ATP number one doubles ranking; Mike Bryan, Łukasz Kubot and Bruno Soares were also in contention for the top ranking.

Mike Bryan and Jack Sock were the reigning champions, but Sock did not participate due to injury. Mike Bryan partnered his brother Bob, but lost in the third round to Mahut and Roger-Vasselin.

This was the first Wimbledon where a final set tie break rule was introduced. Upon reaching 12–12 in the fifth set, a classic tie break would be played. Henri Kontinen and John Peers won the first final set tie break played in any match in Wimbledon history, defeating Rajeev Ram and Joe Salisbury in the third round.

This was the sixth consecutive major where the men's doubles event was won by a pair of players from the same nation.

== Seeds ==
1. (Poland) Łukasz Kubot / (Brazil) Marcelo Melo (quarterfinals)
2. (Colombia) Juan Sebastián Cabal / (Colombia) Robert Farah (champions)
3. (South Africa) Raven Klaasen / (New Zealand) Michael Venus (semifinals)
4. (Croatia) Mate Pavić / (Brazil) Bruno Soares (second round)
5. (Netherlands) Jean-Julien Rojer / (Romania) Horia Tecău (quarterfinals)
6. (Croatia) Nikola Mektić / (Croatia) Franko Škugor (third round)
7. (United States) Bob Bryan / (United States) Mike Bryan (third round)
8. (Finland) Henri Kontinen / (Australia) John Peers (quarterfinals)

9. (Argentina) Máximo González / (Argentina) Horacio Zeballos (third round, retired)
10. (United Kingdom) Jamie Murray / (United Kingdom) Neal Skupski (first round)
11. (France) Nicolas Mahut / (France) Édouard Roger-Vasselin (final)
12. (United States) Rajeev Ram / (United Kingdom) Joe Salisbury (third round)
13. (Germany) Kevin Krawietz / (Germany) Andreas Mies (first round)
14. (Austria) Oliver Marach / (Austria) Jürgen Melzer (second round)
15. (United Kingdom) Dominic Inglot / (United States) Austin Krajicek (first round)
16. (Netherlands) Robin Haase / (Denmark) Frederik Nielsen (third round)

Click on the seed number of a player to go to their draw section.

== Draw ==
=== Key ===
- Q = Qualifier
- WC = Wild card
- LL = Lucky loser
- Alt = Alternate
- ITF = ITF entry
- PR = Protected ranking
- SR = Special ranking
- SE = Special exempt
- JE = Junior exempt
- JR = Junior Accelerator Programme entrant
- CO = College Accelerator Programme entrant
- NG = Next Gen Accelerator Program entrant
- w/o = Walkover
- r = Retired
- d = Defaulted

=== Finals ===
Quarterfinals
1	(Poland) Łukasz Kubot (Brazil) Marcelo Melo	6^{3}	7^{7}	3	3
11	(France) Nicolas Mahut (France) Édouard Roger-Vasselin	7^{7}	6^{5}	6	6
(New Zealand) Marcus Daniell (Netherlands) Wesley Koolhof	2	6^{1}	3
(Croatia) Ivan Dodig (Slovakia) Filip Polášek	6	7^{7}	6
8	(Finland) Henri Kontinen (Australia) John Peers	6	3	7^{7}	4	3
3	(South Africa) Raven Klaasen (New Zealand) Michael Venus	4	6	6^{5}	6	6
5	(Netherlands) Jean-Julien Rojer (Romania) Horia Tecău	4	6	7^{10}	4	9
2	(Colombia) Juan Sebastián Cabal (Colombia) Robert Farah	6	3	6^{8}	6	11

Semifinals
11	(France) Nicolas Mahut (France) Édouard Roger-Vasselin	6	7^{9}	7^{7}
(Croatia) Ivan Dodig (Slovakia) Filip Polášek	2	6^{7}	6^{2}
3	(South Africa) Raven Klaasen (New Zealand) Michael Venus	4	7^{7}	6^{2}	4
2	(Colombia) Juan Sebastián Cabal (Colombia) Robert Farah	6	6^{4}	7^{7}	6

Final
11	(France) Nicolas Mahut (France) Édouard Roger-Vasselin	7^{7}	6^{5}	6^{6}	7^{7}	3
2	(Colombia) Juan Sebastián Cabal (Colombia) Robert Farah	6^{5}	7^{7}	7^{8}	6^{5}	6

=== Top half ===
==== Section 1 ====
First round
1	(Poland) Ł Kubot (Brazil) M Melo	4	6	7	7
(Japan) B McLachlan (Germany) J-L Struff	6	3	5	5
(Australia) A de Minaur (Australia) M Reid	6	6	6
(Argentina) F Delbonis (Argentina) A Molteni	4	4	4
(Belgium) S Gillé (Belgium) J Vliegen	6	7^{7}	4	6
(Argentina) G Durán (Argentina) JI Londero	2	6^{4}	6	2
(Brazil) M Demoliner (India) D Sharan	7	6	7
13	(Germany) K Krawietz (Germany) A Mies	5	4	5
11	(France) N Mahut (France) É Roger-Vasselin	6	6	6
WC	(United Kingdom) L Broady (United Kingdom) S Clayton	1	4	2
WC	(United Kingdom) D Evans (United Kingdom) L Glasspool	6^{3}	6	5	3
(Argentina) L Mayer (Portugal) J Sousa	7^{7}	4	7	6
(South Africa) L Harris (Norway) C Ruud	7^{7}	1	3	4
(El Salvador) M Arévalo (Mexico) MÁ Reyes-Varela	6^{3}	6	6	6
(Ukraine) D Molchanov (Slovakia) I Zelenay	6^{3}	4	4
7	(United States) B Bryan (United States) M Bryan	7^{7}	6	6

Second round
1	(Poland) Ł Kubot (Brazil) M Melo	6^{11}	6	6	7^{12}
(Australia) A de Minaur (Australia) M Reid	7^{13}	4	3	6^{10}
(Belgium) S Gillé (Belgium) J Vliegen	6^{1}	7	6^{6}	4
(Brazil) M Demoliner (India) D Sharan	7^{7}	5	7^{8}	6
11	(France) N Mahut (France) É Roger-Vasselin	6	5	6	7
(Argentina) L Mayer (Portugal) J Sousa	1	7	4	5
(El Salvador) M Arévalo (Mexico) MÁ Reyes-Varela	7^{15}	3	4	1
7	(United States) B Bryan (United States) M Bryan	6^{13}	6	6	6

Third round
1	(Poland) Ł Kubot (Brazil) M Melo	7	6^{8}	7^{8}	6
(Brazil) M Demoliner (India) D Sharan	5	7^{10}	6^{6}	3
11	(France) N Mahut (France) É Roger-Vasselin	7^{7}	6	4	7^{7}
7	(United States) B Bryan (United States) M Bryan	6^{3}	2	6	6^{5}

Quarterfinals
1	(Poland) Ł Kubot (Brazil) M Melo	6^{3}	7^{7}	3	3
11	(France) N Mahut (France) É Roger-Vasselin	7^{7}	6^{5}	6	6

==== Section 2 ====
First round
4	(Croatia) M Pavić (Brazil) B Soares	4	6	6	6^{5}	6
(Netherlands) S Arends (Netherlands) M Middelkoop	6	3	2	7^{7}	3
PR	(Serbia) L Đere (Serbia) J Tipsarević	6	3	4	6^{4}
(Mexico) S González (Pakistan) A-u-H Qureshi	4	6	6	7^{7}
(New Zealand) M Daniell (Netherlands) W Koolhof	6	6	4	7^{9}
(India) R Bopanna (Uruguay) P Cuevas	4	4	6	6^{7}
(Spain) J Munar (United Kingdom) C Norrie	4	6	6	6^{11}	6
15	(United Kingdom) D Inglot (United States) A Krajicek	6	3	4	7^{13}	3
10	(United Kingdom) J Murray (United Kingdom) N Skupski	6	6^{2}	6	1	4
(Croatia) I Dodig (Slovakia) F Polášek	2	7^{7}	3	6	6
Alt	(United States) N Monroe (Germany) M Zverev	6	6	7
WC	(United Kingdom) E Hoyt (United Kingdom) L Johnson	4	4	5
(Romania) M Copil (France) U Humbert	6	1	4	0
PR	(France) P-H Herbert (United Kingdom) A Murray	4	6	6	6
(Lithuania) R Berankis (Hungary) M Fucsovics	2	2	2
6	(Croatia) N Mektić (Croatia) F Škugor	6	6	6

Second round
4	(Croatia) M Pavić (Brazil) B Soares	6	6	6^{5}	4	4
(Mexico) S González (Pakistan) A-u-H Qureshi	4	4	7^{7}	6	6
(New Zealand) M Daniell (Netherlands) W Koolhof	1	4	7^{7}	6	6
(Spain) J Munar (United Kingdom) C Norrie	6	6	6^{2}	2	2
(Croatia) I Dodig (Slovakia) F Polášek	7^{7}	6	6
Alt	(United States) N Monroe (Germany) M Zverev	6^{5}	4	3
PR	(France) P-H Herbert (United Kingdom) A Murray	7^{7}	4	2	3
6	(Croatia) N Mektić (Croatia) F Škugor	6^{4}	6	6	6

Third round
(Mexico) S González (Pakistan) A-u-H Qureshi	5	7^{8}	4	4
(New Zealand) M Daniell (Netherlands) W Koolhof	7	6^{6}	6	6
(Croatia) I Dodig (Slovakia) F Polášek	7^{7}	6	7^{7}
6	(Croatia) N Mektić (Croatia) F Škugor	6^{5}	4	6^{3}

Quarterfinals
(New Zealand) M Daniell (Netherlands) W Koolhof	2	6^{1}	3
(Croatia) I Dodig (Slovakia) F Polášek	6	7^{7}	6

=== Bottom half ===
==== Section 3 ====
First round
8	(Finland) H Kontinen (Australia) J Peers	6	6	6
(Spain) G Granollers (Spain) M Granollers	3	4	3
(Sweden) R Lindstedt (Germany) T Pütz	6^{2}	6	6	6
Alt	(Australia) M Purcell (Australia) L Saville	7^{7}	4	2	4
(Serbia) F Krajinović (Serbia) D Lajović	3	2	2
PR	(Australia) M Ebden (Canada) V Pospisil	6	6	6
(Moldova) R Albot (Tunisia) M Jaziri	3	4	2
12	(United States) R Ram (United Kingdom) J Salisbury	6	6	6
16	(Netherlands) R Haase (Denmark) F Nielsen	6	6	6
(Monaco) R Arneodo (Bosnia and Herzegovina) D Džumhur	2	2	3
(United Kingdom) K Skupski (Australia) J-P Smith	6	6	6
WC	(United Kingdom) J Clarke (United Kingdom) J Ward	2	4	2
(India) J Nedunchezhiyan (India) P Raja	2	3	2
WC	(Australia) L Hewitt (Australia) J Thompson	6	6	6
(United Kingdom) L Bambridge (United Kingdom) J O'Mara	5	6^{3}	4
3	(South Africa) R Klaasen (New Zealand) M Venus	7	7^{7}	6

Second round
8	(Finland) H Kontinen (Australia) J Peers	4	6^{1}	7^{11}	6	6
(Sweden) R Lindstedt (Germany) T Pütz	6	7^{7}	6^{9}	3	4
PR	(Australia) M Ebden (Canada) V Pospisil	5	4	6^{3}
12	(United States) R Ram (United Kingdom) J Salisbury	7	6	7^{7}
16	(Netherlands) R Haase (Denmark) F Nielsen	7^{16}	7^{9}	7^{7}
(United Kingdom) K Skupski (Australia) J-P Smith	6^{14}	6^{7}	6^{2}
WC	(Australia) L Hewitt (Australia) J Thompson	3	6^{3}	2
3	(South Africa) R Klaasen (New Zealand) M Venus	6	7^{7}	6

Third round
8	(Finland) H Kontinen (Australia) J Peers	7^{7}	6	3	4	13^{7}
12	(United States) R Ram (United Kingdom) J Salisbury	6^{2}	4	6	6	12^{2}
16	(Netherlands) R Haase (Denmark) F Nielsen	2	3	6^{0}
3	(South Africa) R Klaasen (New Zealand) M Venus	6	6	7^{7}

Quarterfinals
8	(Finland) H Kontinen (Australia) J Peers	6	3	7^{7}	4	3
3	(South Africa) R Klaasen (New Zealand) M Venus	4	6	6^{5}	6	6

==== Section 4 ====
First round
5	(Netherlands) J-J Rojer (Romania) H Tecău	6	6	6
(Italy) M Cecchinato (Italy) A Seppi	4	3	1
(Spain) R Carballés Baena (Italy) L Sonego	3	4	3
(France) F Martin (Monaco) H Nys	6	6	6
(Spain) P Carreño Busta (Spain) F López	4	6	6	7^{7}
(Chile) C Garín (Chile) N Jarry	6	3	4	6^{4}
(Israel) J Erlich (New Zealand) A Sitak	5	6^{5}	3
9	(Argentina) M González (Argentina) H Zeballos	7	7^{7}	6
14	(Austria) O Marach (Austria) J Melzer	6	6	1	2	11
(Chinese Taipei) C-p Hsieh (Indonesia) C Rungkat	3	4	6	6	9
(Czech Republic) R Jebavý (Austria) P Oswald	6	5
(Bolivia) H Dellien (Argentina) G Pella	4	2^{r}
(India) L Paes (France) B Paire	6	7^{7}	3	6^{4}	7
(Kazakhstan) A Bublik (Kazakhstan) M Kukushkin	4	6^{1}	6	7^{7}	9
WC	(United Kingdom) J Draper (United Kingdom) P Jubb	1	4	2
2	(Colombia) JS Cabal (Colombia) R Farah	6	6	6

Second round
5	(Netherlands) J-J Rojer (Romania) H Tecău	6	6	6
(France) F Martin (Monaco) H Nys	1	4	4
(Spain) P Carreño Busta (Spain) F López	5	6^{3}	3
9	(Argentina) M González (Argentina) H Zeballos	7	7	6
14	(Austria) O Marach (Austria) J Melzer	5	4	7	6^{6}
(Czech Republic) R Jebavý (Austria) P Oswald	7	6	5	7^{8}
(Kazakhstan) A Bublik (Kazakhstan) M Kukushkin	6	2	2	1
2	(Colombia) JS Cabal (Colombia) R Farah	4	6	6	6

Third round
5	(Netherlands) J-J Rojer (Romania) H Tecău	7^{7}	3	7	4
9	(Argentina) M González (Argentina) H Zeballos	6^{1}	6	5	3^{r}
(Czech Republic) R Jebavý (Austria) P Oswald	6^{6}	6^{5}	5
2	(Colombia) JS Cabal (Colombia) R Farah	7^{8}	7^{7}	7

Quarterfinals
5	(Netherlands) J-J Rojer (Romania) H Tecău	4	6	7^{10}	4	9
2	(Colombia) JS Cabal (Colombia) R Farah	6	3	6^{8}	6	11
