= 2018 Marburg Open – Doubles =

Doubles
- 2018 Marburg Open

Final
- Champions: (Brazil) Fabrício Neis (Spain) David Vega Hernández
- Runners-up: (Switzerland) Henri Laaksonen (Switzerland) Luca Margaroli
- Score: 4–6, 6–4, [10–8]

Events
Singles	Doubles
- Marburg Open

Máximo González and Fabrício Neis were the defending champions but only Neis chose to defend his title, partnering David Vega Hernández. Neis successfully defended his title.

Neis and Vega Hernández won the title after defeating Henri Laaksonen and Luca Margaroli 4–6, 6–4, [10–8] in the final.

== Seeds ==
1. (Brazil) Fabrício Neis / (Spain) David Vega Hernández (champions)
2. (United States) Nathan Pasha / (United States) Hunter Reese (first round)
3. (Germany) Dustin Brown / (Australia) Rameez Junaid (first round)
4. (Mexico) Hans Hach Verdugo / (Sweden) Andreas Siljeström (semifinals)

== Draw ==
Key

- Q = Qualifier
- WC = Wild card
- LL = Lucky loser
- Alt = Alternate
- ITF = ITF entry
- PR = Protected ranking
- SR = Special ranking
- SE = Special exempt
- JE = Junior exempt
- JR = Junior Accelerator Programme entrant
- CO = College Accelerator Programme entrant
- NG = Next Gen Accelerator Program entrant
- w/o = Walkover
- r = Retired
- d = Defaulted

First round
1	(Brazil) F Neis (Spain) D Vega Hernández	4	6	[11]
WC	(Germany) B Hassan (Germany) Constantin Schmitz	6	4	[9]
(South Africa) L Harris (South Africa) R Roelofse	6	3	[10]
(Germany) M Moraing (Germany) O Otte	3	6	[7]
3	(Germany) D Brown (Australia) R Junaid	1	4
(Kazakhstan) T Khabibulin (Ukraine) V Manafov	6	6
(Poland) G Panfil (Russia) A Vatutin	3	3
(Slovakia) A Martin (Portugal) G Oliveira	6	6
(Australia) M Polmans (Croatia) N Serdarušić	5	4
WC	(France) E Benchetrit (Germany) R Molleker	7	6
(Peru) S Galdós (Argentina) JI Londero	2	3
4	(Mexico) H Hach Verdugo (Sweden) A Siljeström	6	6
WC	(Germany) R Kern (Germany) J Lenz	7	2	[10]
(Poland) T Bednarek (Romania) F Mergea	5	6	[5]
(Switzerland) H Laaksonen (Switzerland) L Margaroli	6^{6}	6	[10]
2	(United States) N Pasha (United States) H Reese	7^{8}	3	[6]

Quarterfinals
1	(Brazil) F Neis (Spain) D Vega Hernández	6	5	[10]
(South Africa) L Harris (South Africa) R Roelofse	3	7	[7]
(Kazakhstan) T Khabibulin (Ukraine) V Manafov	1	5
(Slovakia) A Martin (Portugal) G Oliveira	6	7
WC	(France) E Benchetrit (Germany) R Molleker
4	(Mexico) H Hach Verdugo (Sweden) A Siljeström	w/o
WC	(Germany) R Kern (Germany) J Lenz	6^{3}	2
(Switzerland) H Laaksonen (Switzerland) L Margaroli	7^{7}	6

Semifinals
1	(Brazil) F Neis (Spain) D Vega Hernández	6	7^{7}
(Slovakia) A Martin (Portugal) G Oliveira	3	6^{5}
4	(Mexico) H Hach Verdugo (Sweden) A Siljeström	6	5	[9]
(Switzerland) H Laaksonen (Switzerland) L Margaroli	3	7	[11]

Final
1	(Brazil) F Neis (Spain) D Vega Hernández	4	6	[10]
(Switzerland) H Laaksonen (Switzerland) L Margaroli	6	4	[8]
