= 2018 Marburg Open =

- Date: 2–8 July
- Edition: 9th
- Draw: 32S / 16D
- Surface: Clay
- Location: Marburg, Germany

Champions

Singles
- (Argentina) Juan Ignacio Londero

Doubles
- (Brazil) Fabrício Neis / (Spain) David Vega Hernández
← 2017 ·	Marburg Open

The 2018 Marburg Open was a professional tennis tournament played on clay courts. It was the ninth edition of the tournament which was part of the 2018 ATP Challenger Tour. It took place in Marburg, Germany between 2 and 8 July 2018.

== Singles main-draw entrants ==
=== Seeds ===
Country	Player	Rank^{1}	Seed
EST	Jürgen Zopp	107	1
GER	Yannick Hanfmann	111	2
BOL	Hugo Dellien	120	3
BRA	Thiago Monteiro	132	4
POR	Pedro Sousa	135	5
BRA	Rogério Dutra Silva	136	6
RUS	Alexey Vatutin	137	7
SUI	Henri Laaksonen	142	8

- ^{1} Rankings are as of 25 June 2018.

=== Other entrants ===
The following players received wildcards into the singles main draw:

- (Germany) Benjamin Hassan
- (Germany) Julian Lenz
- (Germany) Rudolf Molleker
- (Germany) Mats Rosenkranz

The following player received entry into the singles main draw as a special exempt:

- (Italy) Gianluca Mager

The following players received entry from the qualifying draw:

- (Brazil) Thomaz Bellucci
- (France) Elliot Benchetrit
- (Romania) Dragoș Dima
- (France) Tristan Lamasine

== Champions ==
=== Singles ===
- (Argentina) Juan Ignacio Londero def. (Bolivia) Hugo Dellien 3–6, 7–5, 6–4.

=== Doubles ===
- (Brazil) Fabrício Neis / (Spain) David Vega Hernández def. (Switzerland) Henri Laaksonen / (Switzerland) Luca Margaroli 4–6, 6–4, [10–8].
