= 2019 Wimbledon Championships – Women's singles =

Women's singles
- 2019 Wimbledon Championships

Final
- Champion: (Romania) Simona Halep
- Runner-up: (United States) Serena Williams
- Score: 6–2, 6–2

Details
- Draw: 128 (16Q / 8WC)
- Seeds: 32

Events
Singles	men	women		boys	girls
Doubles	men	women	mixed	boys	girls
WC Singles	men	women	quad
WC Doubles	men	women	quad
Legends	men	women	seniors
- Wimbledon Championships

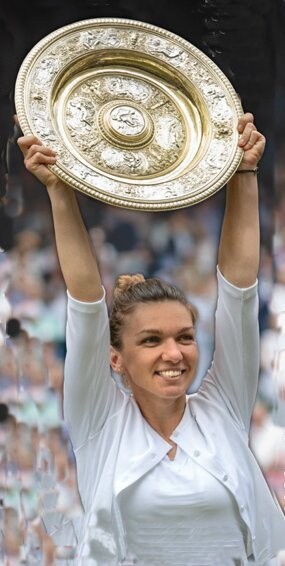
Simona Halep holds the Venus Rosewater Dish

Simona Halep defeated Serena Williams in the final, 6–2, 6–2 to win the ladies' singles tennis title at the 2019 Wimbledon Championships. It was her second and last major title, having also won the 2018 French Open. The final lasted only 56 minutes, and Halep committed a major-final record of just three unforced errors. Halep was the first Romanian to win a Wimbledon senior singles title. At 37 years and 291 days, Williams became the oldest major women's singles finalist in the Open Era (a record she herself would surpass two months later at the US Open).

Angelique Kerber was the defending champion, but lost in the second round to Lauren Davis. This was the first time in the Open Era that a defending major champion lost to a lucky loser.

Ashleigh Barty retained the world No. 1 singles ranking following the tournament, despite losing to Alison Riske in the fourth round. Naomi Osaka, Karolína Plíšková, Kiki Bertens and Petra Kvitová were also in contention for the top ranking.

This tournament marked the major main draw debut of future two-time major champion Coco Gauff, who at 15 years old became the youngest player to win a main draw Wimbledon singles match since Jennifer Capriati in 1991. In that match, Gauff defeated the oldest player in the draw, five-time Wimbledon champion and 39-year-old Venus Williams. Gauff was the youngest qualifier in Wimbledon history. She was defeated by Halep in the fourth round. This tournament also marked the first Wimbledon appearance of future world No. 1 and champion Iga Świątek, who was defeated by Viktorija Golubic in the first round. It was also the final Wimbledon appearance of 2004 champion and former world No. 1 Maria Sharapova, who retired in the first round.

Karolína Muchová was the first player to reach the quarterfinals of Wimbledon on her tournament debut since Li Na in 2006.

This was the first Wimbledon where a final-set tie break rule was introduced. Upon reaching 12–12 in the third set, a classic tie break would be played. No women's singles match required the use of the final-set tie break.

== Seeds ==
Seeding per WTA rankings.

1. (Australia) Ashleigh Barty (fourth round)
2. (Japan) Naomi Osaka (first round)
3. (Czech Republic) Karolína Plíšková (fourth round)
4. (Netherlands) Kiki Bertens (third round)
5. (Germany) Angelique Kerber (second round)
6. (Czech Republic) Petra Kvitová (fourth round)
7. (Romania) Simona Halep (champion)
8. (Ukraine) Elina Svitolina (semifinals)
9. (United States) Sloane Stephens (third round)
10. (Belarus) Aryna Sabalenka (first round)
11. (United States) Serena Williams (final)
12. (Latvia) Anastasija Sevastova (second round)
13. (Switzerland) Belinda Bencic (third round)
14. (Denmark) Caroline Wozniacki (third round)
15. (China) Wang Qiang (third round)
16. (Czech Republic) Markéta Vondroušová (first round)

17. (United States) Madison Keys (second round)
18. (Germany) Julia Görges (third round)
19. (United Kingdom) Johanna Konta (quarterfinals)
20. (Estonia) Anett Kontaveit (third round)
21. (Belgium) Elise Mertens (fourth round)
22. (Croatia) Donna Vekić (first round)
23. (France) Caroline Garcia (first round)
24. (Croatia) Petra Martić (fourth round)
25. (United States) Amanda Anisimova (second round)
26. (Spain) Garbiñe Muguruza (first round)
27. (United States) Sofia Kenin (second round)
28. (Chinese Taipei) Hsieh Su-wei (third round)
29. (Russia) Daria Kasatkina (first round)
30. (Spain) Carla Suárez Navarro (fourth round)
31. (Greece) Maria Sakkari (third round)
32. (Ukraine) Lesia Tsurenko (first round)

Click on the seed number of a player to go to their draw section.

== Draw ==
Key

- Q = Qualifier
- WC = Wild card
- LL = Lucky loser
- Alt = Alternate
- ITF = ITF entry
- PR = Protected ranking
- SR = Special ranking
- SE = Special exempt
- JE = Junior exempt
- JR = Junior Accelerator Programme entrant
- CO = College Accelerator Programme entrant
- NG = Next Gen Accelerator Program entrant
- w/o = Walkover
- r = Retired
- d = Defaulted

=== Finals ===
Quarterfinals
(United States) Alison Riske	4	6	3
11	(United States) Serena Williams	6	4	6
(Czech Republic) Barbora Strýcová	7^{7}	6
19	(United Kingdom) Johanna Konta	6^{5}	1
8	(Ukraine) Elina Svitolina	7	6
(Czech Republic) Karolína Muchová	5	4
7	(Romania) Simona Halep	7^{7}	6
(China) Zhang Shuai	6^{4}	1

Semifinals
11	(United States) Serena Williams	6	6
(Czech Republic) Barbora Strýcová	1	2
8	(Ukraine) Elina Svitolina	1	3
7	(Romania) Simona Halep	6	6

Final
11	(United States) Serena Williams	2	2
7	(Romania) Simona Halep	6	6

=== Top half ===
==== Section 1 ====
First round
1	(Australia) A Barty	6	6
(China) S Zheng	4	2
(Russia) S Kuznetsova	4	6	2
(Belgium) A Van Uytvanck	6	4	6
WC	(United Kingdom) H Dart	4	6	6
LL	(United States) C McHale	6	4	4
Q	(Brazil) B Haddad Maia	6	6
26	(Spain) G Muguruza	4	4
22	(Croatia) D Vekić	6	3	5
(United States) A Riske	3	6	7
Q	(Netherlands) L Kerkhove	6^{5}	4
(Serbia) I Jorović	7^{7}	6
(Switzerland) S Vögele	7	5	4
(Estonia) K Kanepi	5	7	6
(Russia) A Pavlyuchenkova	2	3
13	(Switzerland) B Bencic	6	6

Second round
1	(Australia) A Barty	6	6
(Belgium) A Van Uytvanck	1	3
WC	(United Kingdom) H Dart	7^{7}	3	6
Q	(Brazil) B Haddad Maia	6^{4}	6	1
(United States) A Riske	6	6^{3}	9
(Serbia) I Jorović	2	7^{7}	7
(Estonia) K Kanepi	3	1
13	(Switzerland) B Bencic	6	6

Third round
1	(Australia) A Barty	6	6
WC	(United Kingdom) H Dart	1	1
(United States) A Riske	4	6	6
13	(Switzerland) B Bencic	6	4	4

Fourth round
1	(Australia) A Barty	6	2	3
(United States) A Riske	3	6	6

==== Section 2 ====
First round
11	(United States) S Williams	6	7
Q	(Italy) G Gatto-Monticone	2	5
Q	(Slovenia) K Juvan	6	2	6
(Czech Republic) Kr Plíšková	4	6	4
Q	(Spain) P Badosa	4	2
Q	(Russia) V Flink	6	6
Q	(Romania) E-G Ruse	5	1
18	(Germany) J Görges	7	6
30	(Spain) C Suárez Navarro	6	7
(Australia) S Stosur	2	5
(Russia) M Sharapova	6	6^{4}	0^{r}
(France) P Parmentier	4	7^{7}	5
(Ukraine) K Kozlova	3	2
LL	(United States) L Davis	6	6
(Germany) T Maria	4	3
5	(Germany) A Kerber	6	6

Second round
11	(United States) S Williams	2	6	6
Q	(Slovenia) K Juvan	6	2	4
Q	(Russia) V Flink	1	4
18	(Germany) J Görges	6	6
30	(Spain) C Suárez Navarro	7^{7}	7^{7}
(France) P Parmentier	6^{2}	6^{4}
LL	(United States) L Davis	2	6	6
5	(Germany) A Kerber	6	2	1

Third round
11	(United States) S Williams	6	6
18	(Germany) J Görges	3	4
30	(Spain) C Suárez Navarro	6	6
LL	(United States) L Davis	3	3

Fourth round
11	(United States) S Williams	6	6
30	(Spain) C Suárez Navarro	2	2

==== Section 3 ====
First round
4	(Netherlands) K Bertens	6	6
(Luxembourg) M Minella	3	2
Q	(Australia) Ar Rodionova	2	3
(United States) T Townsend	6	6
(Germany) L Siegemund	6	6
WC	(United Kingdom) K Swan	2	4
(Czech Republic) B Strýcová	6	6
32	(Ukraine) L Tsurenko	3	2
21	(Belgium) E Mertens	6	6
(France) F Ferro	2	0
(Germany) A Petkovic	6	2	5
WC	(Romania) M Niculescu	2	6	7
(Slovenia) T Zidanšek	6	5	8
(Canada) E Bouchard	3	7	6
(Belarus) V Lapko	2	2
15	(China) Q Wang	6	6

Second round
4	(Netherlands) K Bertens	3	7^{7}	6
(United States) T Townsend	6	6^{5}	2
(Germany) L Siegemund	3	5
(Czech Republic) B Strýcová	6	7
21	(Belgium) E Mertens	7	6
WC	(Romania) M Niculescu	5	0
(Slovenia) T Zidanšek	1	2
15	(China) Q Wang	6	6

Third round
4	(Netherlands) K Bertens	5	1
(Czech Republic) B Strýcová	7	6
21	(Belgium) E Mertens	6	6^{9}	6
15	(China) Q Wang	2	7^{11}	4

Fourth round
(Czech Republic) B Strýcová	4	7	6
21	(Belgium) E Mertens	6	5	2

==== Section 4 ====
First round
9	(United States) S Stephens	6	6
(Switzerland) T Bacsinszky	2	4
(China) Y Wang	6	7
Q	(Czech Republic) T Martincová	2	5
(Russia) E Alexandrova	6	1	1
(Czech Republic) K Siniaková	2	6	6
Q	(Romania) A Bogdan	5	2
19	(United Kingdom) J Konta	7	6
25	(United States) A Anisimova	6	6
(Romania) S Cîrstea	3	3
(Poland) M Linette	6	7^{11}
Q	(Russia) A Kalinskaya	0	6^{9}
(Russia) V Diatchenko	5	7^{7}	2
(France) K Mladenovic	7	6^{4}	6
(Tunisia) O Jabeur	4	2
6	(Czech Republic) P Kvitová	6	6

Second round
9	(United States) S Stephens	6	6
(China) Y Wang	0	2
(Czech Republic) K Siniaková	3	4
19	(United Kingdom) J Konta	6	6
25	(United States) A Anisimova	4	5
(Poland) M Linette	6	7
(France) K Mladenovic	5	2
6	(Czech Republic) P Kvitová	7	6

Third round
9	(United States) S Stephens	6	4	1
19	(United Kingdom) J Konta	3	6	6
(Poland) M Linette	3	2
6	(Czech Republic) P Kvitová	6	6

Fourth round
19	(United Kingdom) J Konta	4	6	6
6	(Czech Republic) P Kvitová	6	2	4

=== Bottom half ===
==== Section 5 ====
First round
8	(Ukraine) E Svitolina	7	6
(Australia) D Gavrilova	5	0
(Russia) M Gasparyan	6	6
PR	(Germany) A-L Friedsam	4	4
LL	(Czech Republic) M Bouzková	6	6
(Germany) M Barthel	3	3
(United States) B Pera	6^{4}	3
31	(Greece) M Sakkari	7^{7}	6
24	(Croatia) P Martić	3	6	6
(United States) J Brady	6	3	4
(Russia) A Potapova	2	6	6
(Switzerland) J Teichmann	6	4	1
(United States) D Collins	6	7
(Kazakhstan) Z Diyas	3	5
Q	(United States) K Ahn	3	4
12	(Latvia) A Sevastova	6	6

Second round
8	(Ukraine) E Svitolina	5	6
(Russia) M Gasparyan	7	5^{r}
LL	(Czech Republic) M Bouzková	4	1
31	(Greece) M Sakkari	6	6
24	(Croatia) P Martić	3	6	6
(Russia) A Potapova	6	3	4
(United States) D Collins	4	6	6
12	(Latvia) A Sevastova	6	4	3

Third round
8	(Ukraine) E Svitolina	6	6^{1}	6
31	(Greece) M Sakkari	3	7^{7}	2
24	(Croatia) P Martić	6	3	6
(United States) D Collins	4	6	4

Fourth round
8	(Ukraine) E Svitolina	6	6
24	(Croatia) P Martić	4	2

==== Section 6 ====
First round
16	(Czech Republic) M Vondroušová	4	4
(United States) M Brengle	6	6
(Czech Republic) K Muchová	7	6
(Serbia) A Krunić	5	2
Q	(United States) C McNally	6^{3}	2
(United Kingdom) H Watson	7^{7}	6
PR	(United States) S Rogers	0	6	4
20	(Estonia) A Kontaveit	6	3	6
28	(Chinese Taipei) S-w Hsieh	6	6
(Latvia) J Ostapenko	2	2
(Slovenia) D Jakupović	1	3
(Belgium) K Flipkens	6	6
(Slovakia) AK Schmiedlová	7	4	5
(Puerto Rico) M Puig	5	6	7
(China) L Zhu	2	6^{4}
3	(Czech Republic) Ka Plíšková	6	7^{7}

Second round
(United States) M Brengle	3	4
(Czech Republic) K Muchová	6	6
(United Kingdom) H Watson	5	1
20	(Estonia) A Kontaveit	7	6
28	(Chinese Taipei) S-w Hsieh	7^{7}	6
(Belgium) K Flipkens	6^{3}	3
(Puerto Rico) M Puig	0	4
3	(Czech Republic) Ka Plíšková	6	6

Third round
(Czech Republic) K Muchová	7^{9}	6
20	(Estonia) A Kontaveit	6^{7}	3
28	(Chinese Taipei) S-w Hsieh	3	6	4
3	(Czech Republic) Ka Plíšková	6	2	6

Fourth round
(Czech Republic) K Muchová	4	7	13
3	(Czech Republic) Ka Plíšková	6	5	11

==== Section 7 ====
First round
7	(Romania) S Halep	6	7
(Belarus) A Sasnovich	4	5
(Romania) M Buzărnescu	6	6
(United States) J Pegula	4	4
(France) A Cornet	4	4
(Belarus) V Azarenka	6	6
(Australia) A Tomljanović	6	6
29	(Russia) D Kasatkina	3	1
17	(United States) M Keys	6	6
(Thailand) L Kumkhum	3	2
(Slovenia) P Hercog	4	7^{7}	7
(Slovakia) V Kužmová	6	6^{5}	5
(United States) V Williams	4	4
Q	(United States) C Gauff	6	6
(Slovakia) M Rybáriková	6	6
10	(Belarus) A Sabalenka	2	4

Second round
7	(Romania) S Halep	6	4	6
(Romania) M Buzărnescu	3	6	2
(Belarus) V Azarenka	6	6
(Australia) A Tomljanović	2	0
17	(United States) M Keys	2	4
(Slovenia) P Hercog	6	6
Q	(United States) C Gauff	6	6
(Slovakia) M Rybáriková	3	3

Third round
7	(Romania) S Halep	6	6
(Belarus) V Azarenka	3	1
(Slovenia) P Hercog	6	6^{7}	5
Q	(United States) C Gauff	3	7^{9}	7

Fourth round
7	(Romania) S Halep	6	6
Q	(United States) C Gauff	3	3

==== Section 8 ====
First round
14	(Denmark) C Wozniacki	5
(Spain) S Sorribes Tormo	4^{r}
(Russia) V Kudermetova	6	6
Q	(Belgium) Y Bonaventure	2	4
(Sweden) R Peterson	4	3
Q	(Belgium) Y Wickmayer	6	6
(China) S Zhang	6	6
23	(France) C Garcia	4	0
27	(United States) S Kenin	6	6
(Australia) A Sharma	4	2
(Ukraine) D Yastremska	6	6
(Italy) C Giorgi	3	3
(Poland) I Świątek	2	6^{3}
(Switzerland) V Golubic	6	7^{7}
(Kazakhstan) Y Putintseva	7^{7}	6
2	(Japan) N Osaka	6^{4}	2

Second round
14	(Denmark) C Wozniacki	7^{7}	6
(Russia) V Kudermetova	6^{5}	3
Q	(Belgium) Y Wickmayer	3	2
(China) S Zhang	6	6
27	(United States) S Kenin	5	6	3
(Ukraine) D Yastremska	7	4	6
(Switzerland) V Golubic	6	7^{7}
(Kazakhstan) Y Putintseva	4	6^{3}

Third round
14	(Denmark) C Wozniacki	4	2
(China) S Zhang	6	6
(Ukraine) D Yastremska	7	6
(Switzerland) V Golubic	5	3

Fourth round
(China) S Zhang	6	1	6
(Ukraine) D Yastremska	4	6	2

== Championship match ratings ==
1.197 million on ESPN, in the USA

== Championship match statistics ==
Category	(Romania) Halep	(United States) S. Williams
1st serve %	35/46 (76%)	32/47 (68%)
1st serve points won	29 of 35 = 83%	19 of 32 = 59%
2nd serve points won	5 of 11 = 45%	7 of 15 = 47%
Total service points won	34 of 46 = 73.91%	26 of 47 = 55.32%
Aces	1	2
Double faults	0	1
Winners	13	17
Unforced errors	3	26
Net points won	2 of 2 = 100%	4 of 11 = 36%
Break points converted	4 of 5 = 80%	0 of 1 = 0%
Return points won	21 of 47 = 45%	12 of 46 = 26%
Total points won	55	38

Preceded by 2019 French Open – Women's singles	Grand Slam women's singles	Succeeded by 2019 US Open – Women's singles
