= 2019 Wimbledon Championships – Men's singles =

Men's singles
- 2019 Wimbledon Championships

Final
- Champion: (Serbia) Novak Djokovic
- Runner-up: (Switzerland) Roger Federer
- Score: 7–6^{(7–5)}, 1–6, 7–6^{(7–4)}, 4–6, 13–12^{(7–3)}

Details
- Draw: 128 (16Q / 4WC)
- Seeds: 32

Events
| Singles | men | women | | boys | girls |
| Doubles | men | women | mixed | boys | girls |
| WC Singles | men | women | quad |
| WC Doubles | men | women | quad |
| Legends | men | women | seniors |
- Wimbledon Championships

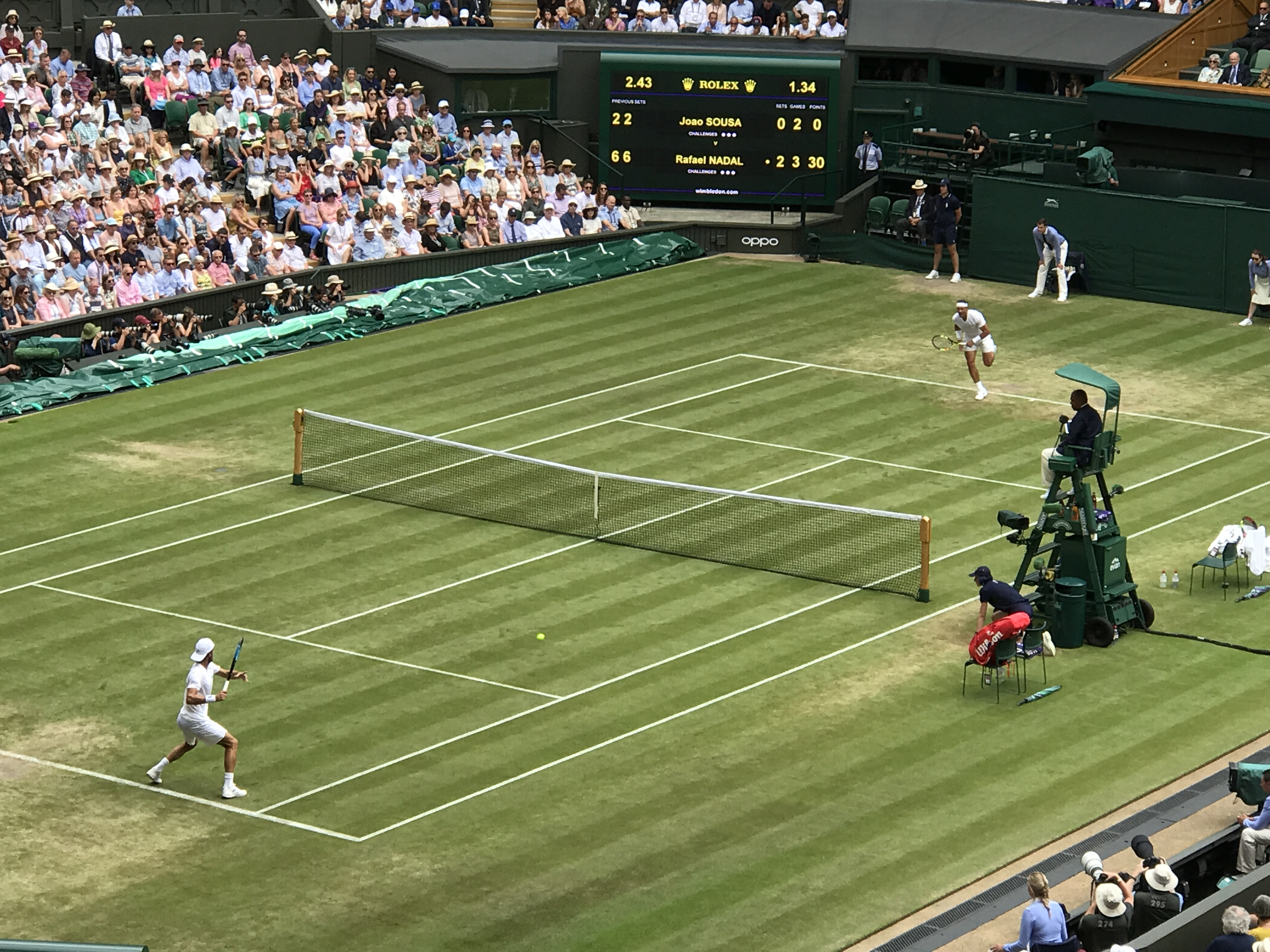
Rafael Nadal (right) and João Sousa (left) playing in the fourth round

Defending champion Novak Djokovic defeated Roger Federer in the final, 7–6^{(7–5)}, 1–6, 7–6^{(7–4)}, 4–6, 13–12^{(7–3)} to win the gentlemen's singles tennis title at the 2019 Wimbledon Championships. At four hours and 57 minutes in length, it was the longest singles final in Wimbledon history. It was Djokovic's fifth Wimbledon title and 16th major title overall. Djokovic was the first man since Bob Falkenburg in 1948 to win the title after being championship points down, having saved two when down 7–8 in the fifth set. This was the first time since the 2004 French Open that a man saved championship points in order to win a major. Djokovic became the second man and third singles player overall to win multiple major titles after saving a match point during the tournament, after Rod Laver and Serena Williams. Conversely, this was the third time that an opponent of Federer saved match points at a major and went on to win the title, following Marat Safin in the 2005 Australian Open and Djokovic in the 2011 US Open.

At this tournament, Federer reached his 31st and last men's singles major final, an all-time record (surpassed by Djokovic in 2022). Aged 37 years, 11 months and 6 days, Federer was the oldest man to reach a major final since Ken Rosewall in the 1974 US Open (surpassed by Djokovic at the 2026 Australian Open). Federer's semifinal match against Rafael Nadal marked their 40th and final professional meeting, with Federer winning to end their head-to-head at 24–16 in Nadal's favor. This was the last tournament in which all of the Big Three reached the semifinals.

This was the first edition of Wimbledon in which a final-set tiebreak rule was introduced. Upon reaching 12–12 in the final set, a classic tiebreak would be played. The men's singles final was the first singles match at Wimbledon in which the new rule came into effect, with Djokovic winning the tiebreak 7–3. Additionally, it was the first men's singles final at any major to feature a final-set, championship-deciding tiebreak.

This tournament marked the final professional appearance of Australian Open finalist Marcos Baghdatis; he lost in the second round. Stan Wawrinka was attempting to complete the career Grand Slam, but he lost to Reilly Opelka in the second round.

== Seeds ==
All seedings per modified ATP rankings.

1. (Serbia) Novak Djokovic (champion)
2. (Switzerland) Roger Federer (final)
3. (Spain) Rafael Nadal (semifinals)
4. (South Africa) Kevin Anderson (third round)
5. (Austria) Dominic Thiem (first round)
6. (Germany) Alexander Zverev (first round)
7. (Greece) Stefanos Tsitsipas (first round)
8. (Japan) Kei Nishikori (quarterfinals)
9. (United States) John Isner (second round)
10. (Russia) Karen Khachanov (third round)
11. (Russia) Daniil Medvedev (third round)
12. (Italy) Fabio Fognini (third round)
13. (Croatia) Marin Čilić (second round)
14. (Croatia) Borna Ćorić (withdrew)
15. (Canada) Milos Raonic (fourth round)
16. (France) Gaël Monfils (first round, retired)
17. (Italy) Matteo Berrettini (fourth round)
18. (Georgia (country)) Nikoloz Basilashvili (second round)
19. (Canada) Félix Auger-Aliassime (third round)
20. (France) Gilles Simon (second round)
21. (Belgium) David Goffin (quarterfinals)
22. (Switzerland) Stan Wawrinka (second round)
23. (Spain) Roberto Bautista Agut (semifinals)
24. (Argentina) Diego Schwartzman (third round)
25. (Australia) Alex de Minaur (second round)
26. (Argentina) Guido Pella (quarterfinals)
27. (France) Lucas Pouille (third round)
28. (France) Benoît Paire (fourth round)
29. (Canada) Denis Shapovalov (first round)
30. (United Kingdom) Kyle Edmund (second round)
31. (Serbia) Laslo Đere (second round)
32. (Serbia) Dušan Lajović (first round)
33. (Germany) Jan-Lennard Struff (third round)

Click on the seed number of a player to go to their draw section.

== Draw ==
Key

- Q = Qualifier
- WC = Wild card
- LL = Lucky loser
- Alt = Alternate
- ITF = ITF entry
- PR = Protected ranking
- SR = Special ranking
- SE = Special exempt
- JE = Junior exempt
- JR = Junior Accelerator Programme entrant
- CO = College Accelerator Programme entrant
- NG = Next Gen Accelerator Program entrant
- w/o = Walkover
- r = Retired
- d = Defaulted

=== Finals ===
Quarterfinals
1 | (Serbia) Novak Djokovic | 6 | 6 | 6
21 | (Belgium) David Goffin | 4 | 0 | 2
26 | (Argentina) Guido Pella | 5 | 4 | 6 | 3
23 | (Spain) Roberto Bautista Agut | 7 | 6 | 3 | 6
(United States) Sam Querrey | 5 | 2 | 2
3 | (Spain) Rafael Nadal | 7 | 6 | 6
8 | (Japan) Kei Nishikori | 6 | 1 | 4 | 4
2 | (Switzerland) Roger Federer | 4 | 6 | 6 | 6

Semifinals
1 | (Serbia) Novak Djokovic | 6 | 4 | 6 | 6
23 | (Spain) Roberto Bautista Agut | 2 | 6 | 3 | 2
3 | (Spain) Rafael Nadal | 6^{3} | 6 | 3 | 4
2 | (Switzerland) Roger Federer | 7^{7} | 1 | 6 | 6

Final
1 | (Serbia) Novak Djokovic | 7^{7} | 1 | 7^{7} | 4 | 13^{7}
2 | (Switzerland) Roger Federer | 6^{5} | 6 | 6^{4} | 6 | 12^{3}

=== Top half ===
==== Section 1 ====
First round
1 | (Serbia) N Djokovic | 6 | 7 | 6
(Germany) P Kohlschreiber | 3 | 5 | 3
(United States) D Kudla | 6 | 6 | 6
(Tunisia) M Jaziri | 4 | 1 | 3
(Latvia) E Gulbis | 1 | 6^{12} | 2
(Argentina) L Mayer | 6 | 7^{14} | 6
(Poland) H Hurkacz | 6 | 4 | 6 | 6
32 | (Serbia) D Lajović | 3 | 6 | 4 | 4
19 | (Canada) F Auger-Aliassime | 5 | 6 | 6 | 6
PR | (Canada) V Pospisil | 7 | 2 | 4 | 3
(Bulgaria) G Dimitrov | 6 | 6 | 6^{4} | 3 | 1
Q | (France) C Moutet | 2 | 3 | 7^{7} | 6 | 6
(Italy) L Sonego | 6^{4} | 4 | 4
Q | (Spain) M Granollers | 7^{7} | 6 | 6
(France) U Humbert | 6^{6} | 3 | 6 | 7 | 3
16 | (France) G Monfils | 7^{8} | 6 | 4 | 5 | 0^{r}

Second round
1 | (Serbia) N Djokovic | 6 | 6 | 6
(United States) D Kudla | 3 | 2 | 2
(Argentina) L Mayer | 7^{7} | 1 | 6^{7} | 3
(Poland) H Hurkacz | 6^{4} | 6 | 7^{9} | 6
19 | (Canada) F Auger-Aliassime | 6 | 4 | 6 | 6
Q | (France) C Moutet | 3 | 6 | 4 | 2
Q | (Spain) M Granollers | 4 | 6^{3} | 5
(France) U Humbert | 6 | 7^{7} | 7

Third round
1 | (Serbia) N Djokovic | 7 | 6^{5} | 6 | 6
(Poland) H Hurkacz | 5 | 7^{7} | 1 | 4
19 | (Canada) F Auger-Aliassime | 4 | 5 | 3
(France) U Humbert | 6 | 7 | 6

Fourth round
1 | (Serbia) N Djokovic | 6 | 6 | 6
(France) U Humbert | 3 | 2 | 3

==== Section 2 ====
First round
11 | (Russia) D Medvedev | 6 | 7^{7} | 7^{7}
(Italy) P Lorenzi | 3 | 6^{2} | 6^{2}
(Spain) P Carreño Busta | 6^{2} | 5 | 2
Q | (Australia) A Popyrin | 7^{7} | 7 | 6
(France) J Chardy | 3 | 6 | 6 | 6
(Slovakia) M Kližan | 6 | 0 | 3 | 4
(United States) B Klahn | 4 | 4 | 4
21 | (Belgium) D Goffin | 6 | 6 | 6
30 | (United Kingdom) K Edmund | 6 | 6 | 6
(Spain) J Munar | 4 | 4 | 4
Q | (Poland) K Majchrzak | 4 | 4 | 4
(Spain) F Verdasco | 6 | 6 | 6
Q | (Italy) A Arnaboldi | 4 | 4 | 6^{4}
(Croatia) I Karlović | 6 | 6 | 7^{7}
(Italy) T Fabbiano | 6 | 3 | 6 | 6^{8} | 6
7 | (Greece) S Tsitsipas | 4 | 6 | 4 | 7^{10} | 3

Second round
11 | (Russia) D Medvedev | 6^{6} | 6 | 6 | 6
Q | (Australia) A Popyrin | 7^{8} | 1 | 4 | 4
(France) J Chardy | 2 | 4 | 3
21 | (Belgium) D Goffin | 6 | 6 | 6
30 | (United Kingdom) K Edmund | 6 | 6 | 6^{3} | 3 | 4
(Spain) F Verdasco | 4 | 4 | 7^{7} | 6 | 6
(Croatia) I Karlović | 3 | 7^{8} | 3 | 7^{7} | 4
(Italy) T Fabbiano | 6 | 6^{6} | 6 | 6^{4} | 6

Third round
11 | (Russia) D Medvedev | 6 | 2 | 6 | 3 | 5
21 | (Belgium) D Goffin | 4 | 6 | 3 | 6 | 7
(Spain) F Verdasco | 6 | 7^{7} | 6
(Italy) T Fabbiano | 4 | 6^{1} | 4

Fourth round
21 | (Belgium) D Goffin | 7^{11} | 2 | 6 | 6
(Spain) F Verdasco | 6^{9} | 6 | 3 | 4

==== Section 3 ====
First round
4 | (South Africa) K Anderson | 6 | 6 | 6
(France) P-H Herbert | 3 | 4 | 2
PR | (Serbia) J Tipsarević | 6 | 6^{2} | 6 | 5 | 6
(Japan) Y Nishioka | 4 | 7^{7} | 2 | 7 | 2
(Italy) A Seppi | 6 | 6^{8} | 6 | 6
(Chile) N Jarry | 3 | 7^{10} | 1 | 2
(Romania) M Copil | 6^{11} | 7 | 3 | 4
26 | (Argentina) G Pella | 7^{13} | 5 | 6 | 6
22 | (Switzerland) S Wawrinka | 6 | 6 | 6
Q | (Belgium) R Bemelmans | 3 | 2 | 2
PR | (Germany) C-M Stebe | 3 | 6^{4} | 1
(United States) R Opelka | 6 | 7^{7} | 6
PR | (Slovakia) J Kovalík | 1 | 3 | 1
(Netherlands) R Haase | 6 | 6 | 6
(India) P Gunneswaran | 6^{1} | 4 | 2
15 | (Canada) M Raonic | 7^{7} | 6 | 6

Second round
4 | (South Africa) K Anderson | 6 | 6^{5} | 6 | 6
PR | (Serbia) J Tipsarević | 4 | 7^{7} | 1 | 4
(Italy) A Seppi | 4 | 6 | 6 | 5 | 1
26 | (Argentina) G Pella | 6 | 4 | 4 | 7 | 6
22 | (Switzerland) S Wawrinka | 5 | 6 | 6 | 4 | 6
(United States) R Opelka | 7 | 3 | 4 | 6 | 8
(Netherlands) R Haase | 6^{1} | 5 | 6^{4}
15 | (Canada) M Raonic | 7^{7} | 7 | 7^{7}

Third round
4 | (South Africa) K Anderson | 4 | 3 | 6^{4}
26 | (Argentina) G Pella | 6 | 6 | 7^{7}
(United States) R Opelka | 6^{1} | 2 | 1
15 | (Canada) M Raonic | 7^{7} | 6 | 6

Fourth round
26 | (Argentina) G Pella | 3 | 4 | 6 | 7^{7} | 8
15 | (Canada) M Raonic | 6 | 6 | 3 | 6^{3} | 6

==== Section 4 ====
First round
10 | (Russia) K Khachanov | 7^{8} | 6 | 4 | 7
Q | (South Korea) S-w Kwon | 6^{6} | 4 | 6 | 5
Q | (United States) M Giron | 4 | 2 | 4
WC | (Spain) F López | 6 | 6 | 6
PR | (Belgium) S Darcis | 6 | 6 | 6
(Germany) M Zverev | 2 | 4 | 4
(Germany) P Gojowczyk | 3 | 2 | 3
23 | (Spain) R Bautista Agut | 6 | 6 | 6
28 | (France) B Paire | 4 | 6 | 6 | 7^{7}
(Argentina) JI Londero | 6 | 4 | 4 | 6^{4}
(Spain) R Carballés Baena | 6 | 3 | 3 | 1
(Serbia) M Kecmanović | 2 | 6 | 6 | 6
(Uruguay) P Cuevas | 4 | 7^{10} | 2 | 6 | 6
(Bosnia and Herzegovina) D Džumhur | 6 | 6^{8} | 6 | 4 | 2
Q | (Czech Republic) J Veselý | 4 | 6 | 6 | 7
6 | (Germany) A Zverev | 6 | 3 | 2 | 5

Second round
10 | (Russia) K Khachanov | 4 | 6 | 7 | 6
WC | (Spain) F López | 6 | 4 | 5 | 4
PR | (Belgium) S Darcis | 3 | 2 | 2^{r}
23 | (Spain) R Bautista Agut | 6 | 6 | 4
28 | (France) B Paire | 7^{7} | 6 | 0
(Serbia) M Kecmanović | 6^{5} | 4 | 0^{r}
(Uruguay) P Cuevas | 6 | 6^{5} | 4 | 4
Q | (Czech Republic) J Veselý | 4 | 7^{7} | 6 | 6

Third round
10 | (Russia) K Khachanov | 3 | 6^{3} | 1
23 | (Spain) R Bautista Agut | 6 | 7^{7} | 6
28 | (France) B Paire | 5 | 7^{7} | 6 | 7^{7}
Q | (Czech Republic) J Veselý | 7 | 6^{5} | 3 | 6^{2}

Fourth round
23 | (Spain) R Bautista Agut | 6 | 7 | 6
28 | (France) B Paire | 3 | 5 | 2

=== Bottom half ===
==== Section 5 ====
First round
5 | (Austria) D Thiem | 7^{7} | 6^{1} | 3 | 0
(United States) S Querrey | 6^{4} | 7^{7} | 6 | 6
(Chile) C Garín | 6 | 4 | 5 | 4
(Russia) A Rublev | 4 | 6 | 7 | 6
(Bolivia) H Dellien | 2 | 3 | 4
(Australia) J Millman | 6 | 6 | 6
(Argentina) G Andreozzi | 6 | 6^{3} | 6^{3} | 3
31 | (Serbia) L Đere | 3 | 7^{7} | 7^{7} | 6
20 | (France) G Simon | 7^{9} | 6 | 6
Q | (Italy) S Caruso | 6^{7} | 3 | 2
Q | (Japan) Y Uchiyama | 6 | 2 | 4 | 3
(United States) T Sandgren | 3 | 6 | 6 | 6
(Hungary) M Fucsovics | 3 | 6 | 7^{7} | 6
Q | (Austria) D Novak | 6 | 4 | 6^{2} | 2
(United States) F Tiafoe | 7 | 4 | 3 | 6 | 4
12 | (Italy) F Fognini | 5 | 6 | 6 | 4 | 6

Second round
(United States) S Querrey | 6 | 6 | 6
(Russia) A Rublev | 3 | 2 | 3
(Australia) J Millman | 6 | 6 | 6
31 | (Serbia) L Đere | 3 | 2 | 1
20 | (France) G Simon | 2 | 3 | 6 | 6 | 6
(United States) T Sandgren | 6 | 6 | 4 | 3 | 8
(Hungary) M Fucsovics | 7^{8} | 4 | 6^{3} | 6 | 3
12 | (Italy) F Fognini | 6^{6} | 6 | 7^{7} | 2 | 6

Third round
(United States) S Querrey | 7^{7} | 7^{10} | 6
(Australia) J Millman | 6^{3} | 6^{8} | 3
(United States) T Sandgren | 6 | 7^{14} | 6
12 | (Italy) F Fognini | 3 | 6^{12} | 3

Fourth round
(United States) S Querrey | 6 | 6^{7} | 7^{7} | 7^{7}
(United States) T Sandgren | 4 | 7^{9} | 6^{3} | 6^{5}

==== Section 6 ====
First round
13 | (Croatia) M Čilić | 7^{8} | 7^{7} | 6
(France) A Mannarino | 6^{6} | 6^{4} | 3
(Portugal) J Sousa | 6 | 6 | 6^{8} | 6
WC | (United Kingdom) P Jubb | 0 | 3 | 7^{10} | 1
(Argentina) F Delbonis | 3 | 6^{5} | 3
(United Kingdom) D Evans | 6 | 7^{7} | 6
WC | (United Kingdom) J Ward | 6 | 6 | 4 | 4 | 6
18 | (Georgia (country)) N Basilashvili | 2 | 4 | 6 | 6 | 8
29 | (Canada) D Shapovalov | 6^{0} | 4 | 3
(Lithuania) R Berankis | 7^{7} | 6 | 6
(Australia) B Tomic | 2 | 1 | 4
(France) J-W Tsonga | 6 | 6 | 6
(Australia) N Kyrgios | 7^{7} | 3 | 7^{12} | 0 | 6
(Australia) J Thompson | 6^{4} | 6 | 6^{10} | 6 | 1
Q | (Japan) Y Sugita | 3 | 1 | 3
3 | (Spain) R Nadal | 6 | 6 | 6

Second round
13 | (Croatia) M Čilić | 4 | 4 | 4
(Portugal) J Sousa | 6 | 6 | 6
(United Kingdom) D Evans | 6 | 6 | 7^{7}
18 | (Georgia (country)) N Basilashvili | 3 | 2 | 6^{2}
(Lithuania) R Berankis | 6^{4} | 3 | 3
(France) J-W Tsonga | 7^{7} | 6 | 6
(Australia) N Kyrgios | 3 | 6 | 6^{5} | 6^{3}
3 | (Spain) R Nadal | 6 | 3 | 7^{7} | 7^{7}

Third round
(Portugal) J Sousa | 4 | 6 | 7 | 4 | 6
(United Kingdom) D Evans | 6 | 4 | 5 | 6 | 4
(France) J-W Tsonga | 2 | 3 | 2
3 | (Spain) R Nadal | 6 | 6 | 6

Fourth round
(Portugal) J Sousa | 2 | 2 | 2
3 | (Spain) R Nadal | 6 | 6 | 6

==== Section 7 ====
First round
8 | (Japan) K Nishikori | 6 | 7^{7} | 6
Q | (Brazil) T Monteiro | 4 | 6^{3} | 4
(Uzbekistan) D Istomin | 2 | 4 | 4
(United Kingdom) C Norrie | 6 | 6 | 6
(United States) S Johnson | 6 | 6 | 6
(Spain) A Ramos Viñolas | 4 | 2 | 3
(Italy) M Cecchinato | 0 | 4 | 6^{5}
25 | (Australia) A de Minaur | 6 | 6 | 7^{7}
33 | (Germany) J-L Struff | 6 | 6 | 6
(Moldova) R Albot | 4 | 3 | 2
(United States) T Fritz | 6 | 6 | 6
PR | (Czech Republic) T Berdych | 4 | 4 | 3
(Spain) P Andújar | 3 | 2 | 4
(Kazakhstan) M Kukushkin | 6 | 6 | 6
(Norway) C Ruud | 3 | 4 | 6^{9}
9 | (United States) J Isner | 6 | 6 | 7^{11}

Second round
8 | (Japan) K Nishikori | 6 | 6 | 6
(United Kingdom) C Norrie | 4 | 4 | 0
(United States) S Johnson | 3 | 7^{7} | 6 | 3 | 6
25 | (Australia) A de Minaur | 6 | 6^{4} | 3 | 6 | 3
33 | (Germany) J-L Struff | 6 | 6 | 5 | 7^{7}
(United States) T Fritz | 4 | 3 | 7 | 6^{2}
(Kazakhstan) M Kukushkin | 6 | 6^{3} | 4 | 6 | 6
9 | (United States) J Isner | 4 | 7^{7} | 6 | 1 | 4

Third round
8 | (Japan) K Nishikori | 6 | 6 | 6
(United States) S Johnson | 4 | 3 | 2
33 | (Germany) J-L Struff | 3 | 6^{5} | 6 | 5
(Kazakhstan) M Kukushkin | 6 | 7^{7} | 4 | 7

Fourth round
8 | (Japan) K Nishikori | 6 | 3 | 6 | 6
(Kazakhstan) M Kukushkin | 3 | 6 | 3 | 4

==== Section 8 ====
First round
17 | (Italy) M Berrettini | 3 | 6 | 6 | 7^{7}
(Slovenia) A Bedene | 6 | 3 | 2 | 6^{3}
LL | (Canada) B Schnur | 2 | 4 | 4
WC | (Cyprus) M Baghdatis | 6 | 6 | 6
WC | (Germany) D Koepfer | 6 | 4 | 7^{11} | 6
(Serbia) F Krajinović | 3 | 6 | 6^{9} | 1
(Australia) M Ebden | 4 | 6 | 3 | 2
24 | (Argentina) D Schwartzman | 6 | 3 | 6 | 6
27 | (France) L Pouille | 6 | 6 | 7^{7}
(France) R Gasquet | 1 | 4 | 6^{4}
(Kazakhstan) A Bublik | 6 | 4 | 3 | 3
Q | (France) G Barrère | 3 | 6 | 6 | 6
WC | (United Kingdom) J Clarke | 4 | 7 | 6 | 6
Q | (United States) N Rubin | 6 | 5 | 4 | 4
(South Africa) L Harris | 6 | 1 | 2 | 2
2 | (Switzerland) R Federer | 3 | 6 | 6 | 6

Second round
17 | (Italy) M Berrettini | 6 | 7^{7} | 6
WC | (Cyprus) M Baghdatis | 1 | 6^{4} | 3
WC | (Germany) D Koepfer | 0 | 3 | 5
24 | (Argentina) D Schwartzman | 6 | 6 | 7
27 | (France) L Pouille | 6 | 7^{7} | 6
Q | (France) G Barrère | 1 | 6^{0} | 4
WC | (United Kingdom) J Clarke | 1 | 6^{3} | 2
2 | (Switzerland) R Federer | 6 | 7^{7} | 6

Third round
17 | (Italy) M Berrettini | 6^{5} | 7^{7} | 4 | 7^{7} | 6
24 | (Argentina) D Schwartzman | 7^{7} | 6^{2} | 6 | 6^{5} | 3
27 | (France) L Pouille | 5 | 2 | 6^{4}
2 | (Switzerland) R Federer | 7 | 6 | 7^{7}

Fourth round
17 | (Italy) M Berrettini | 1 | 2 | 2
2 | (Switzerland) R Federer | 6 | 6 | 6

== Championship match ratings ==
The match drew 3.329 million viewers on ESPN in the USA.

| Preceded by 2019 French Open – Men's singles | Grand Slam men's singles | Succeeded by 2019 US Open – Men's singles |
