= 2019 Wimbledon Championships – Women's doubles =

Women's doubles
- 2019 Wimbledon Championships

Final
- Champions: (Chinese Taipei) Hsieh Su-wei (Czech Republic) Barbora Strýcová
- Runners-up: (Canada) Gabriela Dabrowski (China) Xu Yifan
- Score: 6−2, 6−4

Events
Singles	men	women		boys	girls
Doubles	men	women	mixed	boys	girls
WC Singles	men	women	quad
WC Doubles	men	women	quad
Legends	men	women	seniors
← 2018 ·	Wimbledon Championships	· 2021 →

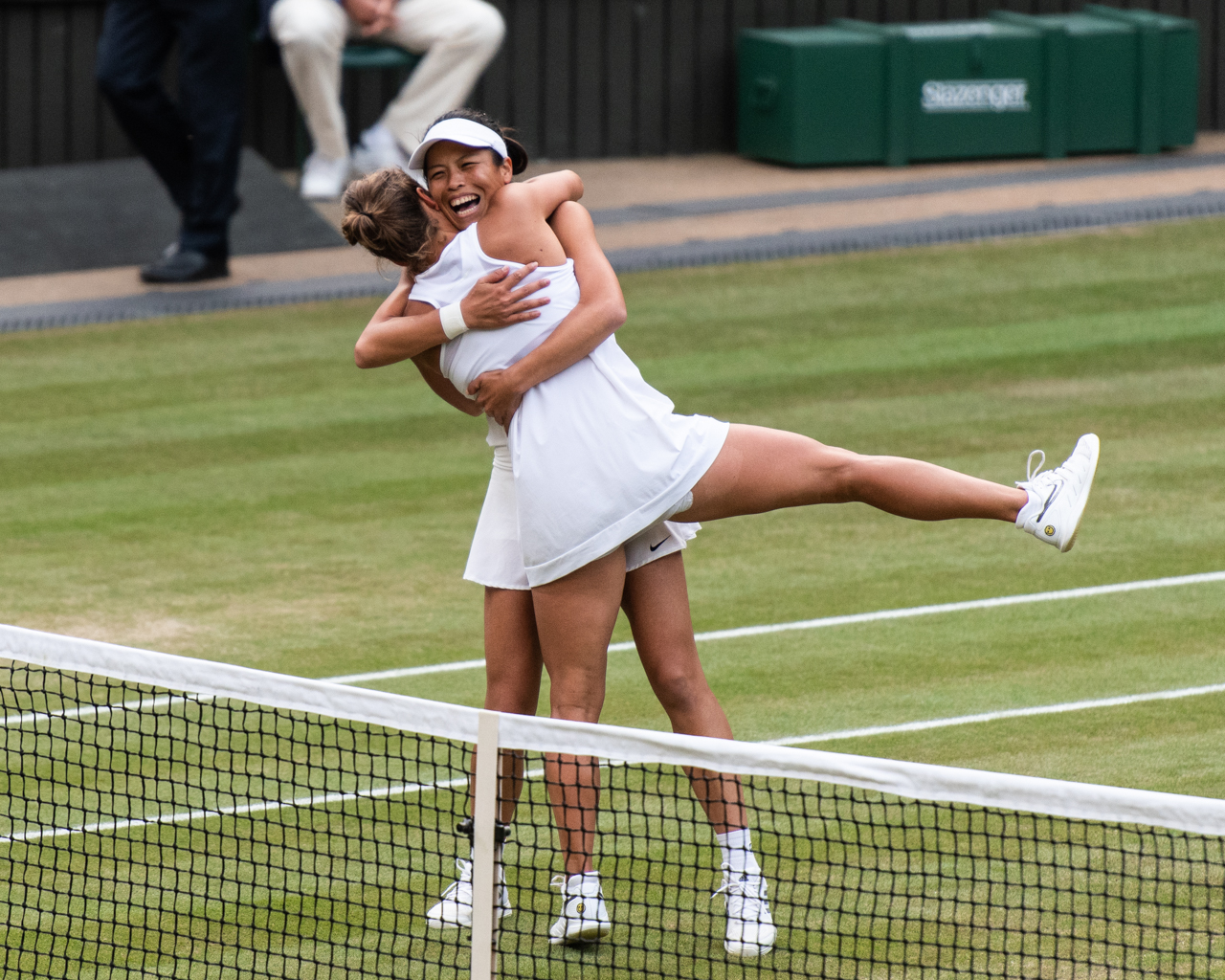
Hsieh and Strýcová hug after winning the final.

Hsieh Su-wei and Barbora Strýcová defeated Gabriela Dabrowski and Xu Yifan in the final, 6−2, 6−4 to win the ladies' doubles tennis title at the 2019 Wimbledon Championships. With the win, Strýcová attained the WTA no. 1 doubles ranking for the first time – Kristina Mladenovic, Elise Mertens and Ashleigh Barty were also in contention for the top ranking. Hsieh and Strýcová won the title without losing a set during the tournament.

Barbora Krejčíková and Kateřina Siniaková were the defending champions, but lost in the semifinals to Dabrowski and Xu.

This was the first Wimbledon to feature a final set tie break rule. Upon reaching 12–12 in the third set, a standard tie-break would be played where the winners would be the first to reach at least seven points and lead by two points.

Bethanie Mattek-Sands and Samantha Stosur were each bidding to complete the career Grand Slam in doubles, but lost in the second and third round, respectively.

== Seeds ==
1. (Hungary) Tímea Babos / (France) Kristina Mladenovic (semifinals)
2. (Czech Republic) Barbora Krejčíková / (Czech Republic) Kateřina Siniaková (semifinals)
3. (Chinese Taipei) Hsieh Su-wei / (Czech Republic) Barbora Strýcová (champions)
4. (Canada) Gabriela Dabrowski / (China) Xu Yifan (final)
5. (Australia) Samantha Stosur / (China) Zhang Shuai (second round)
6. (Belgium) Elise Mertens / (Belarus) Aryna Sabalenka (quarterfinals)
7. (United States) Nicole Melichar / (Czech Republic) Květa Peschke (quarterfinals)
8. (Germany) Anna-Lena Grönefeld / (Netherlands) Demi Schuurs (quarterfinals)

9. (Chinese Taipei) Chan Hao-ching / (Chinese Taipei) Latisha Chan (third round)
10. (Belarus) Victoria Azarenka / (Australia) Ashleigh Barty (third round, withdrew)
11. (Czech Republic) Lucie Hradecká / (Slovenia) Andreja Klepač (first round)
12. (Belgium) Kirsten Flipkens / (Sweden) Johanna Larsson (second round)
13. (China) Duan Yingying / (China) Zheng Saisai (third round)
14. (Russia) Veronika Kudermetova / (Latvia) Jeļena Ostapenko (first round)
15. (Romania) Irina-Camelia Begu / (Romania) Monica Niculescu (third round)
16. (United States) Raquel Atawo / (Ukraine) Lyudmyla Kichenok (second round)

Click on the seed number of a player to go to their draw section.

== Draw ==
=== Key ===
- Q = Qualifier
- WC = Wild card
- LL = Lucky loser
- Alt = Alternate
- ITF = ITF entry
- PR = Protected ranking
- SR = Special ranking
- SE = Special exempt
- JE = Junior exempt
- JR = Junior Accelerator Programme entrant
- CO = College Accelerator Programme entrant
- NG = Next Gen Accelerator Program entrant
- w/o = Walkover
- r = Retired
- d = Defaulted

=== Finals ===
Quarterfinals
1	(Hungary) Tímea Babos (France) Kristina Mladenovic	2	6	9
7	(United States) Nicole Melichar (Czech Republic) Květa Peschke	6	2	7
3	(Chinese Taipei) Hsieh Su-wei (Czech Republic) Barbora Strýcová	6	6
6	(Belgium) Elise Mertens (Belarus) Aryna Sabalenka	4	2
PR	(United States) Danielle Collins (United States) Bethanie Mattek-Sands	1	3
4	(Canada) Gabriela Dabrowski (China) Xu Yifan	6	6
8	(Germany) Anna-Lena Grönefeld (Netherlands) Demi Schuurs	2	6^{1}
2	(Czech Republic) Barbora Krejčíková (Czech Republic) Kateřina Siniaková	6	7^{7}

Semifinals
1	(Hungary) Tímea Babos (France) Kristina Mladenovic	6^{5}	4
3	(Chinese Taipei) Hsieh Su-wei (Czech Republic) Barbora Strýcová	7^{7}	6
4	(Canada) Gabriela Dabrowski (China) Xu Yifan	6	3	6
2	(Czech Republic) Barbora Krejčíková (Czech Republic) Kateřina Siniaková	1	6	3

Final
3	(Chinese Taipei) Hsieh Su-wei (Czech Republic) Barbora Strýcová	6	6
4	(Canada) Gabriela Dabrowski (China) Xu Yifan	2	4

=== Top half ===
==== Section 1 ====
First round
1	(Hungary) T Babos (France) K Mladenovic	6	3	6
(United States) J Pegula (United States) M Sanchez	4	6	2
(Russia) A Potapova (Ukraine) D Yastremska	4	3
(United States) J Brady (United States) A Riske	6	6
(Romania) S Cîrstea (Kazakhstan) G Voskoboeva	6	6
WC	(United Kingdom) SB Grey (United Kingdom) E Silva	0	3
(France) A Cornet (Croatia) P Martić	4	6	6
14	(Russia) V Kudermetova (Latvia) J Ostapenko	6	4	3
12	(Belgium) K Flipkens (Sweden) J Larsson	7^{7}	6
11	(Switzerland) B Bencic (Slovakia) V Kužmová	6^{4}	4
(Ukraine) N Kichenok (United States) A Spears	4	6	6
(United States) S Kenin (Germany) A Petkovic	6	0	4
(United States) D Krawczyk (Mexico) G Olmos	3	6	7
(Chile) A Guarachi (United States) S Santamaria	6	3	5
(Romania) I Bara (Poland) M Linette	5	2
7	(United States) N Melichar (Czech Republic) K Peschke	7	6

Second round
1	(Hungary) T Babos (France) K Mladenovic	6	6
(United States) J Brady (United States) A Riske	2	2
(Romania) S Cîrstea (Kazakhstan) G Voskoboeva	4	3
(France) A Cornet (Croatia) P Martić	6	6
12	(Belgium) K Flipkens (Sweden) J Larsson	3	3
(Ukraine) N Kichenok (United States) A Spears	6	6
(United States) D Krawczyk (Mexico) G Olmos	4	4
7	(United States) N Melichar (Czech Republic) K Peschke	6	6

Third round
1	(Hungary) T Babos (France) K Mladenovic	w/o
(France) A Cornet (Croatia) P Martić
(Ukraine) N Kichenok (United States) A Spears	2	3
7	(United States) N Melichar (Czech Republic) K Peschke	6	6

Quarterfinals
1	(Hungary) T Babos (France) K Mladenovic	2	6	9
7	(United States) N Melichar (Czech Republic) K Peschke	6	2	7

==== Section 2 ====
First round
3	(Chinese Taipei) S-w Hsieh (Czech Republic) B Strýcová	6	6
(Germany) M Barthel (Switzerland) X Knoll	2	1
(Russia) E Alexandrova (Switzerland) V Golubic	6	1	6
(United States) A Muhammad (United States) T Townsend	4	6	4
Alt	(United States) M Brengle (New Zealand) E Routliffe	6	5	1
(China) X Han (Georgia (country)) O Kalashnikova	4	7	6
(Russia) D Kasatkina (Estonia) A Kontaveit	6	4	2
15	(Romania) I-C Begu (Romania) M Niculescu	3	6	6
9	(Chinese Taipei) H-c Chan (Chinese Taipei) L Chan	6	6
WC	(United Kingdom) H Dart (United Kingdom) K Dunne	2	4
WC	(United Kingdom) F Christie (United Kingdom) K Swan	5	2
Alt	(Belgium) G Minnen (Belgium) A Van Uytvanck	7	6
(Japan) S Aoyama (Serbia) A Krunić	7^{7}	7^{7}
(United States) K Christian (Slovenia) D Jakupović	6^{3}	6^{3}
(Russia) N Dzalamidze (Sweden) C Lister	3	4
6	(Belgium) E Mertens (Belarus) A Sabalenka	6	6

Second round
3	(Chinese Taipei) S-w Hsieh (Czech Republic) B Strýcová	6	6
(Russia) E Alexandrova (Switzerland) V Golubic	2	2
(China) X Han (Georgia (country)) O Kalashnikova	3	6	0
15	(Romania) I-C Begu (Romania) M Niculescu	6	3	6
9	(Chinese Taipei) H-c Chan (Chinese Taipei) L Chan	6	6
Alt	(Belgium) G Minnen (Belgium) A Van Uytvanck	2	1
(Japan) S Aoyama (Serbia) A Krunić	7^{7}	5	4
6	(Belgium) E Mertens (Belarus) A Sabalenka	6^{5}	7	6

Third round
3	(Chinese Taipei) S-w Hsieh (Czech Republic) B Strýcová	6	6
15	(Romania) I-C Begu (Romania) M Niculescu	3	4
9	(Chinese Taipei) H-c Chan (Chinese Taipei) L Chan	5	3
6	(Belgium) E Mertens (Belarus) A Sabalenka	7	6

Quarterfinals
3	(Chinese Taipei) S-w Hsieh (Czech Republic) B Strýcová	6	6
6	(Belgium) E Mertens (Belarus) A Sabalenka	4	2

=== Bottom half ===
==== Section 3 ====
First round
5	(Australia) S Stosur (China) S Zhang	6	3	6
(Russia) M Gasparyan (Russia) A Panova	3	6	2
(Romania) A Mitu (France) P Parmentier	4	2
PR	(United States) D Collins (United States) B Mattek-Sands	6	6
(Sweden) R Peterson (Slovenia) T Zidanšek	6	7^{7}
(Romania) M Buzărnescu (Romania) R Olaru	3	6^{4}
PR	(Belarus) L Marozava (Australia) S Sanders	0	1
10	(Belarus) V Azarenka (Australia) A Barty	6	6
13	(China) Y Duan (China) S Zheng	6	6
Alt	(Slovakia) M Rybáriková (Switzerland) S Vögele	2	3
PR	(Puerto Rico) M Puig (United States) S Rogers	6	1	7
(Japan) M Ninomiya (Czech Republic) R Voráčová	4	6	9
(Ukraine) K Kozlova (Australia) Ar Rodionova	4	6	6
(Croatia) D Jurak (Slovenia) K Srebotnik	6	2	4
(Tunisia) O Jabeur (Hungary) F Stollár	1	3
4	(Canada) G Dabrowski (China) Y Xu	6	6

Second round
5	(Australia) S Stosur (China) S Zhang	6	2	3
PR	(United States) D Collins (United States) B Mattek-Sands	4	6	6
(Sweden) R Peterson (Slovenia) T Zidanšek	2	3
10	(Belarus) V Azarenka (Australia) A Barty	6	6
13	(China) Y Duan (China) S Zheng	5	6	6
(Japan) M Ninomiya (Czech Republic) R Voráčová	7	4	1
(Ukraine) K Kozlova (Australia) Ar Rodionova	2	1
4	(Canada) G Dabrowski (China) Y Xu	6	6

Third round
PR	(United States) D Collins (United States) B Mattek-Sands	w/o
10	(Belarus) V Azarenka (Australia) A Barty
13	(China) Y Duan (China) S Zheng	5	3
4	(Canada) G Dabrowski (China) Y Xu	7	6

Quarterfinals
PR	(United States) D Collins (United States) B Mattek-Sands	1	3
4	(Canada) G Dabrowski (China) Y Xu	6	6

==== Section 4 ====
First round
8	(Germany) A-L Grönefeld (Netherlands) D Schuurs	6^{5}	6	9
(Australia) M Adamczak (Australia) E Perez	7^{7}	1	7
(Russia) V Diatchenko (Kazakhstan) Y Putintseva	6^{1}	3
(Poland) A Rosolska (Australia) A Sharma	7^{7}	6
(Russia) A Blinkova (China) Y Wang	2	6	7
(Japan) N Hibino (Japan) M Kato	6	3	5
(Greece) M Sakkari (Australia) A Tomljanović	6	6
11	(Czech Republic) L Hradecká (Slovenia) A Klepač	3	2
16	(United States) R Atawo (Ukraine) L Kichenok	6	1	6
(Luxembourg) M Minella (United Kingdom) H Watson	4	6	4
(China) S Peng (China) Z Yang	6	5	6
(Germany) A-L Friedsam (Germany) L Siegemund	4	7	8
(Switzerland) T Bacsinszky (United States) B Pera	4	6	1
(Belarus) A Sasnovich (Ukraine) L Tsurenko	6	4	6
WC	(United Kingdom) N Bains (United Kingdom) N Broady	5	1
2	(Czech Republic) B Krejčíková (Czech Republic) K Siniaková	7	6

Second round
8	(Germany) A-L Grönefeld (Netherlands) D Schuurs	6	6
(Poland) A Rosolska (Australia) A Sharma	3	0
(Russia) A Blinkova (China) Y Wang	6	6
(Greece) M Sakkari (Australia) A Tomljanović	1	4
16	(United States) R Atawo (Ukraine) L Kichenok	6	4	0
(Germany) A-L Friedsam (Germany) L Siegemund	2	6	6
(Belarus) A Sasnovich (Ukraine) L Tsurenko	1^{r}
2	(Czech Republic) B Krejčíková (Czech Republic) K Siniaková	4

Third round
8	(Germany) A-L Grönefeld (Netherlands) D Schuurs	6	7^{9}
(Russia) A Blinkova (China) Y Wang	4	6^{7}
(Germany) A-L Friedsam (Germany) L Siegemund	6^{6}	1
2	(Czech Republic) B Krejčíková (Czech Republic) K Siniaková	7^{8}	6

Quarterfinals
8	(Germany) A-L Grönefeld (Netherlands) D Schuurs	2	6^{1}
2	(Czech Republic) B Krejčíková (Czech Republic) K Siniaková	6	7^{7}
