= 2018 Marburg Open – Singles =

Singles
- 2018 Marburg Open

Final
- Champion: (Argentina) Juan Ignacio Londero
- Runner-up: (Bolivia) Hugo Dellien
- Score: 3–6, 7–5, 6–4

Events
Singles	Doubles
- Marburg Open

Filip Krajinović was the defending champion but chose not to defend his title.

Juan Ignacio Londero won the title after defeating Hugo Dellien 3–6, 7–5, 6–4 in the final.

== Seeds ==
1. (Estonia) Jürgen Zopp (second round)
2. (Germany) Yannick Hanfmann (first round)
3. (Bolivia) Hugo Dellien (final)
4. (Brazil) Thiago Monteiro (second round)
5. (Portugal) Pedro Sousa (second round)
6. (Brazil) Rogério Dutra Silva (first round)
7. (Russia) Alexey Vatutin (second round)
8. (Switzerland) Henri Laaksonen (second round)

== Draw ==
Key

- Q = Qualifier
- WC = Wild card
- LL = Lucky loser
- Alt = Alternate
- ITF = ITF entry
- PR = Protected ranking
- SR = Special ranking
- SE = Special exempt
- JE = Junior exempt
- JR = Junior Accelerator Programme entrant
- CO = College Accelerator Programme entrant
- NG = Next Gen Accelerator Program entrant
- w/o = Walkover
- r = Retired
- d = Defaulted

=== Finals ===
Semifinals
(Argentina) Juan Ignacio Londero	7	1	6
(Canada) Félix Auger-Aliassime	5	6	1
3	(Bolivia) Hugo Dellien	6	6
WC	(Germany) Julian Lenz	3	3

Final
(Argentina) Juan Ignacio Londero	3	7	6
3	(Bolivia) Hugo Dellien	6	5	4

=== Top half ===
First round
1	(Estonia) J Zopp	6	6
(Spain) D Gimeno Traver	4	1
(Germany) D Brown	3	4
(Argentina) JI Londero	6	6
(Argentina) C Berlocq	6	6
(Germany) M Moraing	4	2
WC	(Germany) M Rosenkranz	5	4
7	(Russia) A Vatutin	7	6
4	(Brazil) T Monteiro	3	6	6
SE	(Italy) G Mager	6	2	2
(Germany) O Otte	6	6
WC	(Germany) B Hassan	0	4
(Canada) F Auger-Aliassime	6	4	6
Q	(Romania) D Dima	3	6	4
(France) C Lestienne	4	7^{7}	3
8	(Switzerland) H Laaksonen	6	6^{2}	6

Second round
1	(Estonia) J Zopp	4	2
(Argentina) JI Londero	6	6
(Argentina) C Berlocq	6	4	7
7	(Russia) A Vatutin	3	6	5
4	(Brazil) T Monteiro	3	6	3
(Germany) O Otte	6	1	6
(Canada) F Auger-Aliassime	6	7^{7}
8	(Switzerland) H Laaksonen	3	6^{5}

Quarterfinals
(Argentina) JI Londero	6	6
(Argentina) C Berlocq	1	4
(Germany) O Otte	4	5
(Canada) F Auger-Aliassime	6	7

Semifinals
(Argentina) JI Londero	7	1	6
(Canada) F Auger-Aliassime	5	6	1

=== Bottom half ===
First round
5	(Portugal) P Sousa	6	6
(Croatia) N Serdarušić	4	1
(Australia) M Polmans	3	3
(Slovakia) A Martin	6	6
Q	(Brazil) T Bellucci	6^{8}	6	6
(South Africa) L Harris	7^{10}	4	4
Q	(France) T Lamasine	2	2
3	(Bolivia) H Dellien	6	6
6	(Brazil) R Dutra Silva	4	4
(France) G Sakharov	6	6
Q	(France) E Benchetrit	6	6
(Spain) R Ojeda Lara	4	4
(Austria) S Ofner	1	6^{4}
WC	(Germany) J Lenz	6	7^{7}
WC	(Germany) R Molleker	4	7^{7}	6
2	(Germany) Y Hanfmann	6	6^{4}	4

Second round
5	(Portugal) P Sousa	6^{5}	6	3
(Slovakia) A Martin	7^{7}	3	6
Q	(Brazil) T Bellucci	6	3	6^{6}
3	(Bolivia) H Dellien	3	6	7^{8}
(France) G Sakharov	3	0
Q	(France) E Benchetrit	6	6
WC	(Germany) J Lenz	3	6	7^{7}
WC	(Germany) R Molleker	6	3	6^{2}

Quarterfinals
(Slovakia) A Martin	2	1
3	(Bolivia) H Dellien	6	6
Q	(France) E Benchetrit	4	5
WC	(Germany) J Lenz	6	7

Semifinals
3	(Bolivia) H Dellien	6	6
WC	(Germany) J Lenz	3	3
