= Juan Ignacio Londero =

Argentine tennis player

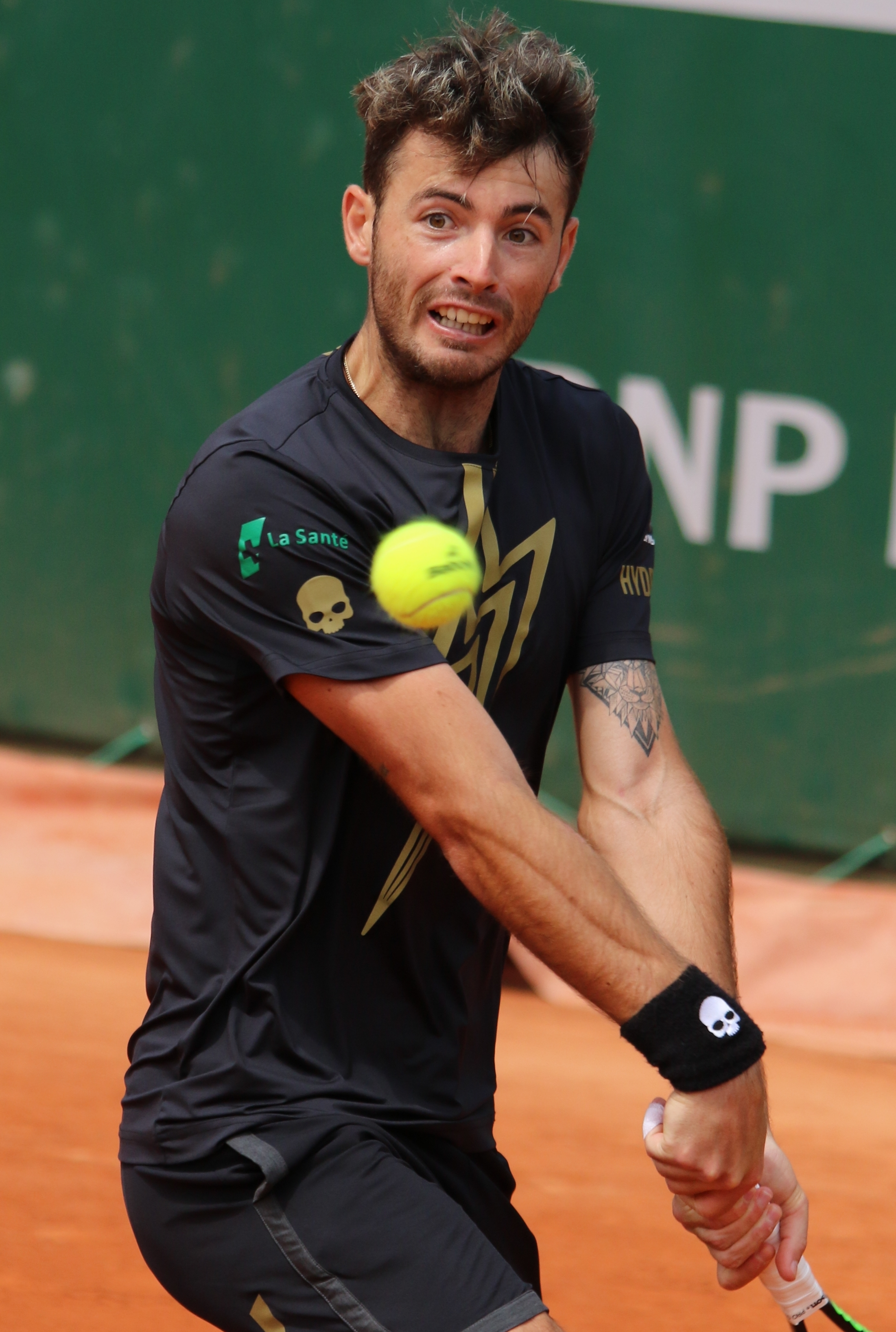
- Londero at the 2019 French Open
- Country (sports): Argentina
- Born: 15 August 1993 (age 33) Jesús María, Argentina
- Height: 1.80 m (5 ft 11 in)
- Turned pro: 2010
- Retired: Nov 2024 (last match played)
- Plays: Right-handed (two-handed backhand)
- Coach: Andrés Schneiter
- Prize money: US $2,120,569

Singles
- Career record: 35–50 (in ATP Tour and Grand Slam main draws, and in Davis Cup)
- Career titles: 1
- Highest ranking: No. 50 (11 November 2019)

Grand Slam singles results
- Australian Open: 1R (2020, 2021)
- French Open: 4R (2019)
- Wimbledon: 1R (2019, 2021)
- US Open: 2R (2019, 2020)

Doubles
- Career record: 8–20 (in ATP Tour and Grand Slam main draws, and in Davis Cup)
- Career titles: 0
- Highest ranking: No. 186 (2 March 2020)

Grand Slam doubles results
- Australian Open: 1R (2020)
- French Open: 1R (2019, 2020)
- US Open: 2R (2019)

Juan Ignacio Londero (Latin American Spanish: [xwan iɣˈnasjo ˈlondeɾo]; born 15 August 1993) is an inactive Argentine professional tennis player. Londero reached his career-high ATP singles ranking of world No. 50 on 11 November 2019 and his highest ATP doubles ranking of world No. 186 on 2 March 2020.

== Career ==
In Juky 2013, Londero made his first appearance on the ATP Tour when he lost in the first round of the 2013 Claro Open Colombia against eventual champion Ivo Karlović.

He managed to win his first tour-level match at the 2019 Córdoba Open against Nicolás Jarry and subsequently won his first ATP title at the tournament as a wildcard, defeating Guido Pella in the final. As a result, he reached a career-high singles ranking of world No. 69 on 11 February 2019.

On his Grand Slam debut, Londero reached the fourth round of the 2019 French Open for the first time, but lost to Rafael Nadal. He became the first man to reach the fourth round in his Major debut since David Goffin in the event's 2012 edition. He entered the 2022 French Open as lucky loser, but lost to sixth seed Carlos Alcaraz in straight sets.

== Performance timelines ==
Key
W	F	SF	QF	#R	RR	Q#	DNQ	A	NH

(W) winner; (F) finalist; (SF) semifinalist; (QF) quarterfinalist; (#R) rounds 4, 3, 2, 1; (RR) round-robin stage; (Q#) qualification round; (DNQ) did not qualify; (A) absent; (NH) not held; (SR) strike rate (events won / competed); (W–L) win–loss record.
To avoid confusion and double counting, these charts are updated at the conclusion of a tournament or when the player's participation has ended.

=== Singles ===
Current after the 2022 French Open.

Tournament	2013	2014	2015	2016	2017	2018	2019	2020	2021	2022	SR	W–L	Win %
Grand Slams
Australian Open	A	A	A	A	A	A	Q2	1R	1R	A	0 / 2	0–2	0%
French Open	A	Q1	Q1	A	A	Q3	4R	2R	1R	1R	0 / 4	4–4	50%
Wimbledon	A	Q1	A	A	A	Q1	1R	NH	1R		0 / 2	0–2	0%
US Open	A	Q3	A	A	A	Q1	2R	2R	Q1		0 / 2	2–2	50%
Win–loss	0–0	0–0	0–0	0–0	0–0	0–0	4–3	2–3	0–3	0–1	0 / 10	6–10	38%
ATP Masters 1000
Indian Wells Masters	A	A	A	A	A	A	Q1	NH	A		0 / 0	0–0	0%
Miami Open	A	A	A	A	A	A	Q1	NH	A		0 / 0	0–0	0%
Monte Carlo Masters	A	A	A	A	A	A	1R	NH	2R		0 / 2	0–2	0%
Madrid Open	A	A	A	A	A	A	Q2	NH	Q2		0 / 0	0–0	0%
Italian Open	A	A	A	A	A	A	A	Q1	Q1		0 / 0	0–0	0%
Canadian Open	A	A	A	A	A	A	A	NH	A		0 / 0	0–0	0%
Cincinnati Masters	A	A	A	A	A	A	2R	Q1	A		0 / 1	1–1	50%
Shanghai Masters	A	A	A	A	A	A	1R	NH	A		0 / 1	0–1	0%
Paris Masters	A	A	A	A	A	A	Q1	A	A		0 / 0	0–0	0%
Win–loss	0–0	0–0	0–0	0–0	0–0	0–0	1–3	0–0	0–1	0–0	0 / 4	1–4	20%
Career statistics
	2013	2014	2015	2016	2017	2018	2019	2020	2021	2022	Total		
Tournaments	1	1	0	0	0	1	22	9	11	5	total: 50		
Titles	0	0	0	0	0	0	1	0	0	0	total: 1		
Finals	0	0	0	0	0	0	2	0	0	0	total: 2		
Overall win–loss	0–1	0–1	0–0	0–0	0–0	0–1	22–21	9–10	0–11	4–5	1 / 50	35–50	42%
Win %	0%	0%	0%	0%	0%	0%	51%	47%	0%	44%	41.18%		
Year-end ranking	278	232	287	341	362	118	50	79	144	238	$2,120,569		

== ATP Tour finals ==
=== Singles: 2 (1 title, 1 runner-up) ===
Legend Grand Slam (0–0) ATP Masters 1000 (0–0) ATP 500 (0–0) ATP 250 (1–1)	Finals by surface Hard (0–0) Clay (1–1) Grass (0–0)	Finals by setting Outdoor (1–1) Indoor (0–0)

Result	W–L	Date	Tournament	Tier	Surface	Opponent	Score
Win	1–0	Feb 2019	Córdoba Open, Argentina	ATP 250	Clay	(Argentina) Guido Pella	3–6, 7–5, 6–1
Loss	1–1	Jul 2019	Swedish Open, Sweden	ATP 250	Clay	(Chile) Nicolás Jarry	6–7^{(7–9)}, 4–6

=== Doubles: 1 (1 runner-up) ===
Legend Grand Slam (0–0) ATP Masters 1000 (0–0) ATP 500 (0–0) ATP 250 (0–1)	Finals by surface Hard (0–0) Clay (0–1) Grass (0–0)	Finals by setting Outdoor (0–1) Indoor (0–0)

Result	Date	Tournament	Tier	Surface	Partner	Opponents	Score
Loss	Feb 2020	Argentina Open, Argentina	ATP 250	Clay	(Argentina) Guillermo Durán	(Spain) Marcel Granollers (Argentina) Horacio Zeballos	4–6, 7–5, [16–18]

== ATP Challenger Tour finals ==
=== Singles: 4 (2 titles, 2 runner–ups) ===
Legend ATP Challenger Tour (2–2)

Result	W–L	Date	Tournament	Tier	Surface	Opponent	Score
Win	1–0	Apr 2018	Mexico City, Mexico	Challenger	Clay	(Ecuador) Roberto Quiroz	6–1, 6–3
Win	2–0	Jul 2018	Marburg, Germany	Challenger	Clay	(Bolivia) Hugo Dellien	3–6, 7–5, 6–4
Loss	2–1	Jul 2018	Tampere, Finland	Challenger	Clay	(Netherlands) Tallon Griekspoor	3–6, 6–2, 3–6
Loss	2–2	Nov 2021	Montevideo, Uruguay	Challenger	Clay	(Bolivia) Hugo Dellien	0–6, 1–6

=== Doubles: 3 (1 title, 2 runner–ups) ===
Legend ATP Challenger Tour (1–2)

Result	W–L	Date	Tournament	Tier	Surface	Partner	Opponents	Score
Loss	0–1	Oct 2014	Córdoba, Argentina	Challenger	Clay	(Bolivia) Hugo Dellien	(Brazil) Marcelo Demoliner (Chile) Nicolás Jarry	3–6, 5–7
Loss	0–2	Jul 2017	Tampere, Finland	Challenger	Clay	(Mexico) Lucas Gomez	(Belgium) Sander Gillé (Belgium) Joran Vliegen	2–6, 7–6^{(5)}, [3–10]
Win	1–2	Aug 2017	Santo Domingo, Dominican Republic	Challenger	Clay	(Venezuela) Luis David Martínez	(Colombia) Daniel Elahi Galán (Colombia) Santiago Giraldo	6–4, 6–4

== ITF Tour finals ==
=== Singles: 13 (7 titles, 6 runner–ups) ===
Legend ITF Futures/WTT (5–4)	Finals by surface Hard (0–0) Clay (5–4)

Result	W–L	Date	Tournament	Tier	Surface	Opponent	Score
Loss	0–1	Oct 2011	Bolivia F2, Cochabamba	Futures	Clay	(Argentina) Guido Pella	4–6, 3–6
Win	1–1	Apr 2012	Argentina F7, Neuquén	Futures	Clay	(Argentina) Juan-Pablo Amado	6–2, 3–6, 6–4
Loss	1–2	Sep 2012	Argentina F23, La Rioja	Futures	Clay	(Argentina) Pablo Galdón	1–6, 1–6
Loss	1–3	May 2013	Argentina F5, Villa María	Futures	Clay	(Argentina) Gabriel Alejandro Hidalgo	4–6, 1–6
Loss	1–4	Aug 2013	Argentina F15, San Juan	Futures	Clay	(Argentina) Andrés Molteni	4–6, 7–6^{(2)}, 1–6
Win	2–4	Oct 2013	Peru F3, Lima	Futures	Clay	(Chile) Ricardo Urzua-Rivera	6–7^{(8)}, 6–2, 6–2
Win	3–4	Dec 2013	Venezuela F9, Caracas	Futures	Clay	(Venezuela) Luis David Martínez	6–2, 6–1
Win	4–4	Mar 2014	Argentina F4, Marcos Juarez	Futures	Clay	(Argentina) Andrés Molteni	6–2, 6–4
Win	7–6	Jul 2023	M25 Rosario, Argentina	WTT	Clay	(Paraguay) Daniel Vallejo	6–3, 6–2

=== Doubles: 15 (6 titles, 9 runner–ups) ===
Legend ITF Futures (6–9)	Finals by surface Hard (2–1) Clay (4–8)

Result	W–L	Date	Tournament	Tier	Surface	Partner	Opponents	Score
Loss	0–1	Jun 2011	Argentina F7, Obera	Futures	Clay	(Argentina) Nicolás Pastor	(Argentina) Patricio Heras (Argentina) Guillermo Durán	1–6, 6–7^{(4)}
Loss	0–2	Sep 2011	Bolivia F1, La Paz	Futures	Clay	(Argentina) Rodrigo Scattareggia	(Bolivia) Boris Arias (Bolivia) Hugo Dellien	6–3, 6–7^{(3)}, [7–10]
Loss	0–3	May 2012	Argentina F9, Villa Allende	Futures	Clay	(Argentina) Leandro Migani	(Argentina) Sebastián Decoud (Argentina) Diego Schwartzman	3–6, 4–6
Loss	0–4	Jul 2012	Argentina F17, Córdoba	Futures	Clay	(Ecuador) Diego Hidalgo	(Argentina) Juan Vazquez-Valenzuela (Argentina) Andrés Molteni	2–6, 2–6
Loss	0–5	Jul 2012	Argentina F18, Bell Ville	Futures	Clay	(Uruguay) Martín Cuevas	(Argentina) Guillermo Durán (Argentina) Renzo Olivo	4–6, 5–7
Win	1–5	Sep 2012	Argentina F23, La Rioja	Futures	Clay	(Argentina) Mateo Nicolás Martínez	(Argentina) Gabriel Alejandro Hidalgo (Argentina) M Pérez Mota	3–6, 6–3, [10–8]
Win	2–5	Sep 2012	Argentina F24, San Juan	Futures	Clay	(Argentina) Mateo Nicolás Martínez	(Argentina) Juan Pablo Ortiz (Argentina) Tomás Lipovšek Puches	6–2, 7–6^{(6)}
Loss	2–6	Dec 2012	Argentina F27, Buenos Aires	Futures	Clay	(Argentina) Mateo Nicolás Martínez	(Argentina) Leandro Migani (Argentina) Facundo Mena	3–6, 3–6
Loss	2–7	Apr 2013	Turkey F13, Antalya	Futures	Hard	(Argentina) Mateo Nicolás Martínez	(Argentina) Maximiliano Estévez (Dominican Republic) José Hernández-Fernández	3–6, 5–7
Win	3–7	Apr 2013	Turkey F15, Antalya	Futures	Hard	(Argentina) Mateo Nicolás Martínez	(Russia) Mikhail Biryukov (Moldova) Maxim Dubarenco	6–4, 6–4
Win	4–7	Dec 2013	Venezuela F8, Valencia	Futures	Hard	(Argentina) Maximiliano Estévez	(Venezuela) Roberto Maytín (Venezuela) Piero Luisi	7–6^{(5)}, 6–2
Loss	4–8	Dec 2013	Venezuela F9, Caracas	Futures	Clay	(Argentina) Mateo Nicolás Martínez	(Venezuela) Roberto Maytín (Venezuela) Piero Luisi	3–6, 4–6
Loss	4–9	Mar 2014	Argentina F4, Marcos Juarez	Futures	Clay	(Argentina) Andrés Molteni	(Bolivia) Hugo Dellien (Argentina) Maximiliano Estévez	3–6, 4–6
Win	5–9	Jan 2017	USA F5, Weston	Futures	Clay	(Argentina) Facundo Argüello	(Ecuador) Gonzalo Escobar (Venezuela) Luis David Martínez	6–4, 6–7^{(1)}, [14–12]
Win	6–9	Feb 2017	USA F6, Palm Coast	Futures	Clay	(Argentina) Facundo Argüello	(Republic of Ireland) Julian Bradley (United States) Isaiah Strode	6–2, 6–3
