= 2011 Marburg Open =

- Date: 20–26 June
- Edition: 2nd
- Location: Marburg, Germany

Champions

Singles
- (Germany) Björn Phau

Doubles
- (Germany) Martin Emmrich / (Germany) Björn Phau
← 2010 ·	Marburg Open	· 2012 →

The 2011 Marburg Open was a professional tennis tournament played on hard courts. It was the second edition of the tournament which was part of the 2011 ATP Challenger Tour. It took place in Marburg, Germany between 20 and 26 June 2011.

== ATP entrants ==
=== Seeds ===
Country	Player	Rank^{1}	Seed
ESP	Albert Ramos	100	1
ARG	Diego Junqueira	101	2
FRA	Éric Prodon	108	3
GER	Simon Greul	112	4
NED	Jesse Huta Galung	116	5
ARG	Horacio Zeballos	126	6
CZE	Ivo Minář	132	7
KAZ	Yuri Schukin	141	8

- ^{1} Rankings are as of June 13, 2011.

=== Other entrants ===
The following players received wildcards into the singles main draw:

- (Germany) Constantin Christ
- (Germany) Julian Lenz
- (Austria) Oliver Marach
- (Germany) Jan-Lennard Struff

The following player received entry as a special exempt into the singles main draw:

- (Italy) Stefano Galvani

The following players received entry from the qualifying draw:

- (Serbia) Nikola Ćirić
- (Poland) Marcin Gawron
- (Brazil) André Ghem
- (Ukraine) Artem Smirnov

The following player received entry into the singles main draw as a lucky loser:

- (Germany) Simon Stadler

== Champions ==
=== Singles ===
(Germany) Björn Phau def. (Czech Republic) Jan Hájek, 6–4, 2–6, 6–3.

=== Doubles ===
(Germany) Martin Emmrich / (Germany) Björn Phau def (Argentina) Federico Delbonis / (Argentina) Horacio Zeballos, 7–6^{(7–3)}, 6–2
