= 2016 Marburg Open =

- Date: 27 June – 3 July
- Edition: 7th
- Draw: 32S / 16D
- Prize money: €42,500+H
- Surface: Clay
- Location: Marburg, Germany

Champions

Singles
- (Czech Republic) Jan Šátral

Doubles
- (United States) James Cerretani / (Austria) Philipp Oswald
← 2015 ·	Marburg Open	· 2017 →

The 2016 Marburg Open was a professional tennis tournament played on clay courts. It was the seventh edition of the tournament which was part of the 2016 ATP Challenger Tour. It took place in Marburg, Germany between 27 June and 4 July 2016.

== Singles main-draw entrants ==
=== Seeds ===
Country	Player	Rank^{1}	Seed
ARG	~~Carlos Berlocq~~	~~101~~	1
GEO	Nikoloz Basilashvili	105	2
AUT	Gerald Melzer	107	3
BEL	Steve Darcis	110	4
SVK	Jozef Kovalík	128	5
GER	Daniel Brands	130	6
GER	Tobias Kamke	133	7
ESP	Daniel Muñoz de la Nava	134	8
ARG	Nicolás Kicker	135	9

- ^{1} Rankings are as of June 20, 2016.

=== Other entrants ===
The following players received wildcards into the singles main draw:

- (Germany) Sebastian Fanselow
- (Germany) Jeremy Jahn
- (Germany) Julian Lenz
- (Argentina) Manuel Peña López

The following player received entry as an alternate:

- (Italy) Andrea Arnaboldi

The following players received entry from the qualifying draw:

- (Belgium) Germain Gigounon
- (Bulgaria) Dimitar Kuzmanov
- (India) Sumit Nagal
- (Belgium) Yannik Reuter

The following player received entry as a lucky loser:

- (Ecuador) Giovanni Lapentti

== Doubles main-draw entrants ==
=== Seeds ===
Country	Player	Country	Player	Rank^{1}	Seed
USA	James Cerretani	AUT	Philipp Oswald	180	1
POL	Tomasz Bednarek	BLR	Sergey Betov	236	2
BRA	Fabrício Neis	RSA	Ruan Roelofse	247	3
MEX	Miguel Ángel Reyes-Varela	USA	Max Schnur	263	4

- ^{1} Rankings as of June 20, 2016.

=== Other entrants ===
The following pairs received wildcards into the doubles main draw:

- (Germany) Jan Beusch / (Slovenia) Tadej Turk
- (Germany) Julian Lenz / (Germany) Andreas Mies
- (Croatia) Ivan Sabanov / (Croatia) Matej Sabanov

The following pair received entry courtesy of a protected ranking into the doubles main draw:

- (Germany) Gero Kretschmer / (Germany) Simon Stadler

== Champions ==
=== Singles ===
- (Czech Republic) Jan Šátral def. (Argentina) Marco Trungelliti, 6–2, 6–4

=== Doubles ===
- (United States) James Cerretani / (Austria) Philipp Oswald def. (Mexico) Miguel Ángel Reyes-Varela / (United States) Max Schnur, 6–3, 6–2
