= 2016 Marburg Open – Singles =

Singles
- 2016 Marburg Open

Final
- Champion: (Czech Republic) Jan Šátral
- Runner-up: (Argentina) Marco Trungelliti
- Score: 6–2, 6–4

Events
Singles	Doubles
← 2015 ·	Marburg Open	· 2017 →

Íñigo Cervantes was the defending champion but chose not to defend his title.

Jan Šátral won the title after defeating Marco Trungelliti 6–2, 6–4 in the final.

== Seeds ==
1. (Argentina) Carlos Berlocq (withdrew)
2. (Georgia (country)) Nikoloz Basilashvili (first round)
3. (Austria) Gerald Melzer (second round)
4. (Belgium) Steve Darcis (second round, retired)
5. (Slovakia) Jozef Kovalík (first round)
6. (Germany) Daniel Brands (semifinals)
7. (Germany) Tobias Kamke (first round)
8. (Spain) Daniel Muñoz de la Nava (first round, retired)
9. (Argentina) Nicolás Kicker (quarterfinals)

== Draw ==
=== Key ===
- Q = Qualifier
- WC = Wild card
- LL = Lucky loser
- Alt = Alternate
- SE = Special exempt
- PR = Protected ranking
- ITF = ITF entry
- JE = Junior exempt
- w/o = Walkover
- r = Retired
- d = Defaulted
- SR = Special ranking

=== Finals ===
Semifinals
6	(Germany) Daniel Brands	1	3
(Czech Republic) Jan Šátral	6	6
Q	(Belgium) Yannik Reuter	7	3	3
(Argentina) Marco Trungelliti	5	6	6

Final
(Czech Republic) Jan Šátral	6	6
(Argentina) Marco Trungelliti	2	4

=== Top half ===
First round
9	(Argentina) N Kicker	6^{6}	6	6
WC	(Argentina) M Peña López	7^{8}	3	3
Q	(Belgium) G Gigounon	6	6
(Spain) D Pérez Sanz	1	1
(Slovakia) N Gombos	6	6
WC	(Germany) Jeremy Jahn	0	3
Q	(India) S Nagal	4	6	5
6	(Germany) D Brands	6	3	7
4	(Belgium) S Darcis	6	7^{7}
LL	(Ecuador) G Lapentti	2	6^{4}
(Belgium) A De Greef	3	6^{10}
Q	(Bulgaria) D Kuzmanov	6	7^{12}
(France) A Michon	7^{7}	7^{7}
(China) Z Zhang	6^{5}	6^{3}
(Czech Republic) J Šátral	6	3	6
7	(Germany) T Kamke	2	6	2

Second round
9	(Argentina) N Kicker	6	3	6
Q	(Belgium) G Gigounon	3	6	2
(Slovakia) N Gombos	3	5
6	(Germany) D Brands	6	7
4	(Belgium) S Darcis	3	0^{r}
Q	(Bulgaria) D Kuzmanov	6	0
(France) A Michon	4	1
(Czech Republic) J Šátral	6	6

Quarterfinals
9	(Argentina) N Kicker	4	7^{7}	3
6	(Germany) D Brands	6	6^{1}	6
Q	(Bulgaria) D Kuzmanov	7^{10}	1	2
(Czech Republic) J Šátral	6^{8}	6	6

Semifinals
6	(Germany) D Brands	1	3
(Czech Republic) J Šátral	6	6

=== Bottom half ===
First round
5	(Slovakia) J Kovalík	3	3
Alt	(Italy) A Arnaboldi	6	6
(Italy) F Gaio	2	4
(Spain) E López-Pérez	6	6
WC	(Germany) J Lenz	4	3
Q	(Belgium) Y Reuter	6	6
WC	(Germany) S Fanselow	4	2
3	(Austria) G Melzer	6	6
8	(Spain) D Muñoz de la Nava	2	0^{r}
(Russia) A Rublev	6	0
(Germany) N Langer	6^{0}	7	1
(Spain) D Gimeno-Traver	7^{7}	5	6
(Argentina) M Trungelliti	4	6	6
(Egypt) M Safwat	6	3	4
(Germany) M Zverev	6	4	7^{8}
2	(Georgia (country)) N Basilashvili	2	6	6^{6}

Second round
Alt	(Italy) A Arnaboldi	6	1	7^{7}
(Spain) E López-Pérez	3	6	6^{5}
Q	(Belgium) Y Reuter	3	6	6
3	(Austria) G Melzer	6	1	4
(Russia) A Rublev	7	3	4
(Spain) D Gimeno-Traver	5	6	6
(Argentina) M Trungelliti	6	6
(Germany) M Zverev	4	3

Quarterfinals
Alt	(Italy) A Arnaboldi	6^{6}	1
Q	(Belgium) Y Reuter	7^{7}	6
(Spain) D Gimeno-Traver	3	4
(Argentina) M Trungelliti	6	6

Semifinals
Q	(Belgium) Y Reuter	7	3	3
(Argentina) M Trungelliti	5	6	6
