= 2014 Marburg Open – Doubles =

Doubles
- 2014 Marburg Open

Final
- Champion: (Czech Republic) Jaroslav Pospíšil (Croatia) Franko Škugor
- Runner-up: (Argentina) Diego Sebastián Schwartzman (Argentina) Horacio Zeballos
- Score: 6–4, 6–4

Events
Singles	Doubles
← 2013 ·	Marburg Open	· 2015 →

Andrey Golubev and Evgeny Korolev were the defending champions, but decided not to participate.

Jaroslav Pospíšil and Franko Škugor won the title, defeating Diego Sebastián Schwartzman and Horacio Zeballos in the final 6–4, 6–4.

== Seeds ==
1. (Argentina) Diego Sebastián Schwartzman / (Argentina) Horacio Zeballos (final)
2. (Canada) Adil Shamasdin / (New Zealand) Artem Sitak (first round)
3. (Colombia) Nicolás Barrientos / (Colombia) Juan Carlos Spir (semifinals)
4. (Belarus) Sergey Betov / (Belarus) Alexander Bury (semifinals)

== Draw ==
=== Key ===
- Q = Qualifier
- WC = Wild card
- LL = Lucky loser
- Alt = Alternate
- SE = Special exempt
- PR = Protected ranking
- ITF = ITF entry
- JE = Junior exempt
- w/o = Walkover
- r = Retired
- d = Defaulted
- SR = Special ranking

=== Draw ===
First round
1	(Argentina) DS Schwartzman (Argentina) H Zeballos	6	6
(Puerto Rico) A Llompart (South Africa) D O'Brien	1	1
(Portugal) G Elias (Brazil) JP Sorgi	6	6^{5}	[2]
(United States) J Cerretani (Brazil) J Souza	3	7^{7}	[10]
4	(Belarus) S Betov (Belarus) A Bury	6	6
WC	(Germany) Jan Beusch (Germany) Jan-Lucas Ganssauge	0	3
WC	(Germany) J Lenz (Germany) A Zverev	2	4
(Argentina) M Alund (Brazil) A Ghem	6	6
(Poland) A Kapaś (Poland) B Koniusz	7	1	[8]
(Germany) D Meffert (Germany) P Petzschner	5	6	[10]
(Netherlands) S Fransen (Netherlands) W Koolhof	3	6^{8}
3	(Colombia) N Barrientos (Colombia) JS Spir	6	7^{10}
(Georgia (country)) N Basilashvili (Belarus) U Ignatik	6	0	[6]
(Czech Republic) J Pospíšil (Croatia) F Škugor	4	6	[10]
WC	(Germany) Jannis Kahlke (Slovenia) Tadej Turk	7^{9}	6
2	(Canada) A Shamasdin (New Zealand) A Sitak	6^{7}	3

Quarterfinals
1	(Argentina) DS Schwartzman (Argentina) H Zeballos	3	6	[10]
(United States) J Cerretani (Brazil) J Souza	6	3	[6]
4	(Belarus) S Betov (Belarus) A Bury	6	6
(Argentina) M Alund (Brazil) A Ghem	3	2
(Germany) D Meffert (Germany) P Petzschner	6	3	[8]
3	(Colombia) N Barrientos (Colombia) JS Spir	3	6	[10]
(Czech Republic) J Pospíšil (Croatia) F Škugor	6	6
WC	(Germany) J Kahlke (Slovenia) T Turk	3	3

Semifinals
1	(Argentina) DS Schwartzman (Argentina) H Zeballos	6	7
4	(Belarus) S Betov (Belarus) A Bury	4	5
3	(Colombia) N Barrientos (Colombia) JS Spir	6	6^{5}	[9]
(Czech Republic) J Pospíšil (Croatia) F Škugor	2	7^{7}	[11]

Final
1	(Argentina) DS Schwartzman (Argentina) H Zeballos	4	4
(Czech Republic) J Pospíšil (Croatia) F Škugor	6	6
