= 2013 Marburg Open =

- Date: 24–30 June
- Edition: 4th
- Draw: 32S / 16D
- Prize money: €30,000+H
- Surface: Clay
- Location: Marburg, Germany

Champions

Singles
- (Kazakhstan) Andrey Golubev

Doubles
- (Kazakhstan) Andrey Golubev / (Kazakhstan) Evgeny Korolev
← 2012 ·	Marburg Open	· 2014 →

The 2013 Marburg Open is a professional tennis tournament played on clay courts. It was the fourth edition of the tournament which is part of the 2013 ATP Challenger Tour. It took place in Marburg, Germany, between 24 and 30 June 2013.

== Singles main draw entrants ==
=== Seeds ===
Country	Player	Rank^{1}	Seed
ESP	Rubén Ramírez Hidalgo	125	1
ARG	Diego Sebastián Schwartzman	137	2
CHI	Paul Capdeville	148	3
GER	Simon Greul	155	4
FRA	Josselin Ouanna	162	5
NED	Jesse Huta Galung	167	6
SVK	Andrej Martin	169	7
KAZ	Andrey Golubev	172	8

- ^{1} Rankings are as of June 17, 2013.

=== Other entrants ===
The following players received wildcards into the singles main draw:

- (Germany) Andreas Beck
- (Germany) Julian Lenz
- (Germany) Maximilian Marterer
- (Germany) Dominik Schulz

The following players received entry from the qualifying draw:

- (Germany) Yannick Hanfmann
- (Croatia) Kristijan Mesaroš
- (Germany) Stefan Seifert
- (Russia) Alexey Vatutin

The following player received entry as special exempt:

- (Slovakia) Norbert Gombos

== Doubles main draw entrants ==
=== Seeds ===
Country	Player	Country	Player	Rank^{1}	Seed
ITA	Stefano Ianni	TPE	Lee Hsin-han	257	1
NED	Jesse Huta Galung	AUS	Jordan Kerr	286	2
PHI	Ruben Gonzales	TPE	Peng Hsien-yin	349	3
ITA	Alessandro Motti	ITA	Matteo Volante	400	4

- ^{1} Rankings as of June 17, 2013.

=== Other entrants ===
The following pairs received wildcards into the doubles main draw:

- (Germany) Jannis Kahlke / (Slovenia) Tadej Turk
- (Germany) Jan Beusch / (North Macedonia) Lazar Magdinčev
- (Germany) Nils Langer / (Germany) Marko Zelch

The following pair received entry using a protected ranking:

- (New Zealand) Artem Sitak / (Netherlands) Rogier Wassen

== Champions ==
=== Singles ===
- (Kazakhstan) Andrey Golubev def. (Argentina) Diego Sebastián Schwartzman 6–1, 6–3

=== Doubles ===
- (Kazakhstan) Andrey Golubev / (Kazakhstan) Evgeny Korolev def. (Netherlands) Jesse Huta Galung / (Australia) Jordan Kerr, 6–3, 1–6, [10–6]
