= 2011 Marburg Open – Doubles =

Doubles
- 2011 Marburg Open

Final
- Champions: (Germany) Martin Emmrich (Germany) Björn Phau
- Runners-up: (Argentina) Federico del Bonis (Argentina) Horacio Zeballos
- Score: 7–6(4), 6–2

Events
Singles	Doubles
← 2010 ·	Marburg Open	· 2012 →

Matthias Bachinger and Denis Gremelmayr were the defending champions, but decided not to participate.

Martin Emmrich and Björn Phau won the final defeating Federico del Bonis and Horacio Zeballos 7–6(4), 6–2.

== Seeds ==
1. (United States) Brian Battistone / (Austria) Martin Slanar (quarterfinals)
2. (Poland) Tomasz Bednarek / (Poland) Mateusz Kowalczyk (semifinals)
3. (France) Olivier Charroin / (Latvia) Andis Juška (quarterfinals)
4. (Germany) Martin Emmrich / (Germany) Björn Phau (champions)

== Draw ==
=== Key ===
- Q = Qualifier
- WC = Wild card
- LL = Lucky loser
- Alt = Alternate
- SE = Special exempt
- PR = Protected ranking
- ITF = ITF entry
- JE = Junior exempt
- w/o = Walkover
- r = Retired
- d = Defaulted
- SR = Special ranking

=== Draw ===
First round
1	(United States) B Battistone (Austria) M Slanar	7	6
Alt	(Moldova) R Albot (Ukraine) A Smirnov	5	4
(Australia) R Junaid (Australia) S Kadir	6	6
(Brazil) A Ghem (Chinese Taipei) T-h Yang	3	0
4	(Germany) M Emmrich (Germany) B Phau	4	6	[10]
WC	(Germany) Steven Moneke (Germany) Tim Pütz	6	4	[6]
Alt	(Belarus) S Betov (Poland) A Kapaś	w/o
(France) É Prodon (France) M Teixeira
(Netherlands) J Huta Galung (Portugal) L Tavares
(Argentina) F del Bonis (Argentina) H Zeballos	w/o
WC	(Belarus) A Bury (Belarus) Nikolai Fidirko	6^{4}	6^{6}
3	(France) O Charroin (Latvia) A Juška	7^{7}	7^{8}
(Russia) E Donskoy (Russia) D Matsukevich	w/o
(Germany) S Greul (Germany) S Stadler
WC	(Germany) J Lenz (Austria) O Marach	5	3
2	(Poland) T Bednarek (Poland) M Kowalczyk	7	6

Quarterfinals
1	(United States) B Battistone (Austria) M Slanar	6	6^{4}	[3]
(Australia) R Junaid (Australia) S Kadir	1	7^{7}	[10]
4	(Germany) M Emmrich (Germany) B Phau	7^{7}	6
Alt	(Belarus) S Betov (Poland) A Kapaś	6^{2}	2
(Argentina) F del Bonis (Argentina) H Zeballos	7	5	[10]
3	(France) O Charroin (Latvia) A Juška	5	7	[7]
(Russia) E Donskoy (Russia) D Matsukevich	6^{5}	1
2	(Poland) T Bednarek (Poland) M Kowalczyk	7^{7}	6

Semifinals
(Australia) R Junaid (Australia) S Kadir	4	5
4	(Germany) M Emmrich (Germany) B Phau	6	7
(Argentina) F del Bonis (Argentina) H Zeballos	6	6
2	(Poland) T Bednarek (Poland) M Kowalczyk	4	4

Final
4	(Germany) M Emmrich (Germany) B Phau	7^{7}	6
(Argentina) F del Bonis (Argentina) H Zeballos	6^{3}	2
