= 2012 Marburg Open =

- Date: 25 June – 1 July
- Edition: 3rd
- Surface: Hard
- Location: Marburg, Germany

Champions

Singles
- (Czech Republic) Jan Hájek

Doubles
- (Poland) Mateusz Kowalczyk / (Czech Republic) David Škoch
← 2011 ·	Marburg Open	· 2013 →

The 2012 Marburg Open was a professional tennis tournament played on hard courts. It was the third edition of the tournament which was part of the 2012 ATP Challenger Tour. It took place in Marburg, Germany between 25 June and 1 July 2012.

== ATP entrants ==
=== Seeds ===
Country	Player	Rank^{1}	Seed
ARG	Horacio Zeballos	98	1
ESP	Daniel Gimeno Traver	102	2
CZE	Jan Hájek	103	3
SLO	Aljaž Bedene	111	4
RUS	Teymuraz Gabashvili	147	5
BRA	Júlio Silva	157	6
POR	Gastão Elias	161	7
AUT	Andreas Haider-Maurer	163	8

- ^{1} Rankings are as of June 18, 2012.

=== Other entrants ===
The following players received wildcards into the singles main draw:

- (Germany) Constantin Christ
- (Germany) Robin Kern
- (Germany) Kevin Krawietz
- (Germany) Julian Lenz

The following players received entry from the qualifying draw:

- (Sweden) Markus Eriksson
- (Belarus) Uladzimir Ignatik
- (Germany) Nils Langer
- (Germany) Tim Puetz

== Champions ==
=== Singles ===
- (Czech Republic) Jan Hájek def. (Austria) Andreas Haider-Maurer, 6–2, 6–2

=== Doubles ===
- (Poland) Mateusz Kowalczyk / (Czech Republic) David Škoch def. (Russia) Denis Matsukevich / (Germany) Mischa Zverev, 6–2, 6–1
