= 2011 Marburg Open – Singles =

Singles
- 2011 Marburg Open

Final
- Champion: (Germany) Björn Phau
- Runner-up: (Czech Republic) Jan Hájek
- Score: 6–4, 2–6, 6–3

Events
Singles	Doubles
← 2010 ·	Marburg Open	· 2012 →

Simone Vagnozzi was the defending champion but decided not to participate.

Björn Phau claimed the title. He defeated Jan Hájek 6–4, 2–6, 6–3 in the final match.

== Seeds ==
1. (Spain) Albert Ramos (semifinals)
2. (Argentina) Diego Junqueira (quarterfinals)
3. (France) Éric Prodon (first round)
4. (Germany) Simon Greul (first round)
5. (Netherlands) Jesse Huta Galung (first round)
6. (Argentina) Horacio Zeballos (semifinals)
7. (Czech Republic) Ivo Minář (retired in First Round, right thigh)
8. (Kazakhstan) Yuri Schukin (quarterfinals)

== Draw ==
=== Key ===
- Q = Qualifier
- WC = Wild card
- LL = Lucky loser
- Alt = Alternate
- ITF = ITF entry
- PR = Protected ranking
- SR = Special ranking
- SE = Special exempt
- JE = Junior exempt
- JR = Junior Accelerator Programme entrant
- CO = College Accelerator Programme entrant
- NG = Next Gen Accelerator Program entrant
- w/o = Walkover
- r = Retired
- d = Defaulted

=== Finals ===
Semifinals
1	(Spain) Albert Ramos	2	4
(Czech Republic) Jan Hájek	6	6
(Germany) Björn Phau	6^{1}	6	6
6	(Argentina) Horacio Zeballos	7	3	4

Final
(Czech Republic) Jan Hájek	4	6	3
(Germany) Björn Phau	6	2	6

=== Top half ===
First round
1	(Spain) A Ramos	6	7
(Argentina) F del Bonis	4	5
Q	(Serbia) N Ćirić	1	2^{r}
(Serbia) I Bozoljac	6	4
Q	(Brazil) A Ghem	3	5
(France) V Millot	6	7
WC	(Germany) J Lenz	2	5
8	(Kazakhstan) Y Schukin	6	7
4	(Germany) S Greul	5	2
(Czech Republic) J Hájek	7	6
WC	(Germany) Jan-Lennard Struff	6	7
SE	(Italy) S Galvani	1	6^{3}
(United States) W Odesnik	6	6
(Romania) A Ungur	3	0
(Slovakia) P Červenák	1
7	(Czech Republic) I Minář	0^{r}

Second round
1	(Spain) A Ramos	6^{4}	6	6
(Serbia) I Bozoljac	7	1	3
(France) V Millot	3	4
8	(Kazakhstan) Y Schukin	6	6
(Czech Republic) J Hájek	6	6
WC	(Germany) Jan-Lennard Struff	2	2
(United States) W Odesnik	6	6
(Slovakia) P Červenák	1	2

Quarterfinals
1	(Spain) A Ramos	6	6
8	(Kazakhstan) Y Schukin	3	0
(Czech Republic) J Hájek	4	7	6
(United States) W Odesnik	6	6^{1}	0

Semifinals
1	(Spain) A Ramos	2	4
(Czech Republic) J Hájek	6	6

=== Bottom half ===
First round
5	(Netherlands) J Huta Galung	3	3
LL	(Germany) S Stadler	6	6
(Hungary) A Balázs	4	6	6
WC	(Austria) O Marach	6	2	2
(Portugal) J Sousa	7	6
WC	(Germany) Constantin Christ	5	1
(Germany) B Phau	7	6
3	(France) É Prodon	6^{6}	3
6	(Argentina) H Zeballos	6	7
(Russia) E Donskoy	1	6^{5}
(Russia) D Matsukevich	2	3
Q	(Ukraine) A Smirnov	6	6
(France) M Teixeira	0	6^{7}
Q	(Poland) M Gawron	6	7
(France) G Rufin	3	1
2	(Argentina) D Junqueira	6	6

Second round
LL	(Germany) S Stadler	5	6	2
(Hungary) A Balázs	7	3	6
(Portugal) J Sousa	4	6	5
(Germany) B Phau	6	3	7
6	(Argentina) H Zeballos	6	6
Q	(Ukraine) A Smirnov	1	2
Q	(Poland) M Gawron	1	5
2	(Argentina) D Junqueira	6	7

Quarterfinals
(Hungary) A Balázs	3	3
(Germany) B Phau	6	6
6	(Argentina) H Zeballos	6	4	7
2	(Argentina) D Junqueira	3	6	5

Semifinals
(Germany) B Phau	6^{1}	6	6
6	(Argentina) H Zeballos	7	3	4
