= 2015 Marburg Open =

2015 tennis competition in Germany

- Date: 29 June – 5 July
- Edition: 6th
- Draw: 32S / 16D
- Prize money: €42,500+H
- Surface: Clay
- Location: Marburg, Germany

Champions

Singles
- (Spain) Íñigo Cervantes

Doubles
- (Netherlands) Wesley Koolhof / (Netherlands) Matwé Middelkoop
| ← 2014 · | Marburg Open | · 2016 → |

The 2015 Marburg Open was a professional tennis tournament played on clay courts. It was the sixth edition of the tournament which was part of the 2015 ATP Challenger Tour. It took place in Marburg, Germany between 29 June and 5 July 2015.

== Singles main-draw entrants ==
=== Seeds ===
| Country | Player | Rank^{1} | Seed |
|---|---|---|---|
| JPN | Taro Daniel | 125 | 1 |
| FRA | Paul-Henri Mathieu | 127 | 2 |
| UZB | Farrukh Dustov | 132 | 3 |
| KAZ | Andrey Golubev | 135 | 4 |
| ESP | Íñigo Cervantes | 144 | 5 |
| EST | Jürgen Zopp | 157 | 6 |
| ARG | Renzo Olivo | 158 | 7 |
| GER | Tobias Kamke | 161 | 8 |

- ^{1} Rankings are as of June 22, 2015.

=== Other entrants ===
The following players received wildcards into the singles main draw:

- (Germany) Daniel Brands
- (Germany) Jan Choinski
- (Germany) Julian Lenz
- (Germany) Daniel Masur

The following players gained entry into the Main Draw as a special exempt:

- (Brazil) Rogério Dutra Silva

The following players used protected ranking to gain entry into the Main Draw:

- (Spain) Pere Riba

The following players received entry from the qualifying draw:

- (Belgium) Arthur De Greef
- (Russia) Evgeny Donskoy
- (Russia) Mikhail Ledovskikh
- (Czech Republic) Jan Šátral

The following players gained entry into the Main Draw as a lucky loser:

- (Italy) Lorenzo Giustino

== Doubles main-draw entrants ==
=== Seeds ===
| Country | Player | Country | Player | Rank^{1} | Seed |
|---|---|---|---|---|---|
| NED | Wesley Koolhof | NED | Matwé Middelkoop | 229 | 1 |
| CZE | Roman Jebavý | CZE | Jan Šátral | 229 | 2 |
| PHI | Ruben Gonzales | RSA | Ruan Roelofse | 246 | 3 |
| KAZ | Andrey Golubev | FRA | Alexandre Sidorenko | 255 | 4 |

- ^{1} Rankings as of June 22, 2015.

=== Other entrants ===
The following pairs received wildcards into the doubles main draw:

- (Germany) Jan Beusch / (North Macedonia) Lazar Magdinčev
- (Germany) Jan Choinski / (Germany) Jannis Kahlke
- (Germany) Yannick Hanfmann / (Germany) Julian Lenz

== Champions ==
=== Singles ===
- (Spain) Iñigo Cervantes def. (Germany) Nils Langer 2–6, 7–6^{(7–3)}, 6–3

=== Doubles ===
- (Netherlands) Wesley Koolhof / (Netherlands) Matwé Middelkoop def. (Germany) Tobias Kamke / (Germany) Simon Stadler 6–1, 7–5
