= 2017 Marburg Open – Doubles =

Doubles
- 2017 Marburg Open

Final
- Champions: (Argentina) Máximo González (Brazil) Fabrício Neis
- Runners-up: (Australia) Rameez Junaid (South Africa) Ruan Roelofse
- Score: 6–3, 7–6^{(7–4)}

Events
| Singles | Doubles |
| ← 2016 · | Marburg Open | · 2018 → |

James Cerretani and Philipp Oswald were the defending champions but chose not to defend their title.

Máximo González and Fabrício Neis won the title after defeating Rameez Junaid and Ruan Roelofse 6–3, 7–6^{(7–4)} in the final.

== Seeds ==
1. (Argentina) Máximo González / (Brazil) Fabrício Neis (champions)
2. (Brazil) Fabiano de Paula / (Peru) Sergio Galdós (quarterfinals)
3. (Germany) Andreas Mies / (Germany) Oscar Otte (semifinals)
4. (Australia) Rameez Junaid / (South Africa) Ruan Roelofse (final)

== Draw ==
=== Key ===
- Q = Qualifier
- WC = Wild card
- LL = Lucky loser
- Alt = Alternate
- SE = Special exempt
- PR = Protected ranking
- ITF = ITF entry
- JE = Junior exempt
- w/o = Walkover
- r = Retired
- d = Defaulted
- SR = Special ranking

First round
1 | (Argentina) M González (Brazil) F Neis | 6 | 6
(Argentina) F Coria (Brazil) JP Sorgi | 3 | 1
(France) B Bonzi (Austria) D Pichler | 4 | 7^{7} | [8]
WC | (Germany) J Lenz (Germany) T Pütz | 6 | 6^{4} | [10]
3 | (Germany) A Mies (Germany) O Otte | 6 | 6
WC | (Spain) Jaime Fermosell Delgado (Italy) F Gaio | 3 | 4
(Brazil) F Romboli (Brazil) P Sakamoto | 6 | 3 | [7]
(Spain) E López-Pérez (Spain) R Ramírez Hidalgo | 4 | 6 | [10]
(Germany) Y Hanfmann (Belgium) Y Reuter | 6 | 3 | [10]
Alt | (Italy) R Bellotti (United States) Alexander Centenari | 4 | 6 | [4]
(Belarus) U Ignatik (Czech Republic) V Šafránek | 6^{2} | 6 | [7]
4 | (Australia) R Junaid (South Africa) R Roelofse | 7^{7} | 3 | [10]
(Italy) L Giustino (Italy) A Motti | 4 | 1
(Poland) M Kowalczyk (Poland) G Panfil | 6 | 6
WC | (Germany) B Hassan (Slovenia) Tadej Turk | 2 | 5
2 | (Brazil) F de Paula (Peru) S Galdós | 6 | 7

Quarterfinals
1 | (Argentina) M González (Brazil) F Neis | 6 | 6^{5} | [10]
WC | (Germany) J Lenz (Germany) T Pütz | 4 | 7^{7} | [4]
3 | (Germany) A Mies (Germany) O Otte | 6 | 6
(Spain) E López-Pérez (Spain) R Ramírez Hidalgo | 4 | 3
(Germany) Y Hanfmann (Belgium) Y Reuter | 5 | 7^{10} | [1]
4 | (Australia) R Junaid (South Africa) R Roelofse | 7 | 6^{8} | [10]
(Poland) M Kowalczyk (Poland) G Panfil | 7^{7} | 6
2 | (Brazil) F de Paula (Peru) S Galdós | 6^{4} | 2

Semifinals
1 | (Argentina) M González (Brazil) F Neis | 6 | 6
3 | (Germany) A Mies (Germany) O Otte | 4 | 2
4 | (Australia) R Junaid (South Africa) R Roelofse | 3 | 6 | [10]
(Poland) M Kowalczyk (Poland) G Panfil | 6 | 4 | [7]

Final
1 | (Argentina) M González (Brazil) F Neis | 6 | 7^{7}
4 | (Australia) R Junaid (South Africa) R Roelofse | 3 | 6^{4}
