= 2014 Marburg Open =

- Date: 23–29 June
- Edition: 5th
- Draw: 32S / 16D
- Prize money: €35,000+H
- Surface: Clay
- Location: Marburg, Germany

Champions

Singles
- (Argentina) Horacio Zeballos

Doubles
- (Czech Republic) Jaroslav Pospíšil / (Croatia) Franko Škugor
← 2013 ·	Marburg Open	· 2015 →

The 2014 Marburg Open was a professional tennis tournament played on clay courts. It was the fifth edition of the tournament which was part of the 2014 ATP Challenger Tour. It took place in Marburg, Germany between 23 and 29 June 2014.

== Singles main-draw entrants ==
=== Seeds ===
Country	Player	Rank^{1}	Seed
ARG	Diego Sebastián Schwartzman	93	1
BRA	Thomaz Bellucci	98	2
GER	Andreas Beck	131	3
BRA	João Souza	134	4
ARG	Horacio Zeballos	136	5
NED	Thiemo de Bakker	143	6
POR	Gastão Elias	154	7
ROU	Marius Copil	160	8

- ^{1} Rankings are as of June 16, 2014.

=== Other entrants ===
The following players received wildcards into the singles main draw:

- (Germany) Richard Becker
- (Serbia) Nikola Milojević
- (Germany) Julian Lenz
- (Germany) Alexander Zverev

The following players received entry from the qualifying draw:

- (Serbia) Boris Pašanski
- (Croatia) Franko Škugor
- (Chile) Cristian Garín
- (Slovakia) Jozef Kovalík

== Doubles main-draw entrants ==
=== Seeds ===
Country	Player	Country	Player	Rank^{1}	Seed
ARG	Diego Sebastián Schwartzman	ARG	Horacio Zeballos	229	1
CAN	Adil Shamasdin	NZL	Artem Sitak	229	2
COL	Nicolás Barrientos	COL	Juan Carlos Spir	246	3
BLR	Sergey Betov	BLR	Aliaksandr Bury	255	4

- ^{1} Rankings as of June 16, 2014.

=== Other entrants ===
The following pairs received wildcards into the doubles main draw:

- (Germany) Jan Beusch / (Germany) Jan-Lucas Ganssauge
- (Germany) Julian Lenz / (Germany) Alexander Zverev
- (Germany) Jannis Kahlke / (Slovenia) Tadej Turk

== Champions ==
=== Singles ===
- (Argentina) Horacio Zeballos def. (Netherlands) Thiemo de Bakker 3–6, 6–3, 6–3

=== Doubles ===
- (Czech Republic) Jaroslav Pospíšil / (Croatia) Franko Škugor def. (Argentina) Diego Sebastián Schwartzman / (Argentina) Horacio Zeballos 6–4, 6–4
