= 2013 Marburg Open – Singles =

Singles
- 2013 Marburg Open

Final
- Champion: (Kazakhstan) Andrey Golubev
- Runner-up: (Argentina) Diego Sebastián Schwartzman
- Score: 6–1, 6–3

Events
Singles	Doubles
← 2012 ·	Marburg Open	· 2014 →

Jan Hájek was the defending champion, but decided not to participate.
Andrey Golubev defeated Diego Sebastián Schwartzman in the final 6–1 6–3.

== Seeds ==
1. (Spain) Rubén Ramírez Hidalgo (second round)
2. (Argentina) Diego Sebastián Schwartzman (final)
3. (Chile) Paul Capdeville (quarterfinals)
4. (Germany) Simon Greul (first round)
5. (France) Josselin Ouanna (first round)
6. (Netherlands) Jesse Huta Galung (quarterfinals)
7. (Slovakia) Andrej Martin (quarterfinals)
8. (Kazakhstan) Andrey Golubev (champion)

== Draw ==
=== Key ===
- Q = Qualifier
- WC = Wild card
- LL = Lucky loser
- Alt = Alternate
- SE = Special exempt
- PR = Protected ranking
- ITF = ITF entry
- JE = Junior exempt
- w/o = Walkover
- r = Retired
- d = Defaulted
- SR = Special ranking

=== Finals ===
Semifinals
8	(Kazakhstan) Andrey Golubev	6	6
6	(Netherlands) Jesse Huta Galung	2	4
(Argentina) Máximo González	2	2
2	(Argentina) Diego Sebastián Schwartzman	6	6

Final
8	(Kazakhstan) Andrey Golubev	6	6
2	(Argentina) Diego Sebastián Schwartzman	1	3

=== Top half ===
First round
1	(Spain) R Ramírez Hidalgo	6	6
(Argentina) R Olivo	1	0
(Germany) T Pütz	6^{5}	6	6
WC	(Germany) M Marterer	7^{7}	1	4
Q	(Russia) A Vatutin	6	4	6^{5}
(Germany) N Langer	3	6	7^{7}
WC	(Germany) J Lenz	3	2
8	(Kazakhstan) A Golubev	6	6
4	(Germany) S Greul	1	6	6^{1}
Q	(Croatia) K Mesaroš	6	3	7^{7}
SE	(Slovakia) N Gombos	6	6
(Croatia) M Pavić	3	0
Q	(Germany) Stefan Seifert	4	7	3
(Italy) A Giannessi	6	5	6
(Slovakia) M Mečíř	3	6^{3}
6	(Netherlands) J Huta Galung	6	7^{7}

Second round
1	(Spain) R Ramírez Hidalgo	7^{11}	6^{3}	4
(Germany) T Pütz	6^{9}	7^{7}	6
(Germany) N Langer	6	1	4
8	(Kazakhstan) A Golubev	4	6	4
Q	(Croatia) K Mesaroš	4	2
SE	(Slovakia) N Gombos	6	6
(Italy) A Giannessi	2	2
6	(Netherlands) J Huta Galung	6	6

Quarterfinals
(Germany) T Pütz	4	2
8	(Kazakhstan) A Golubev	6	6
SE	(Slovakia) N Gombos	6^{0}	3
6	(Netherlands) J Huta Galung	7^{7}	6

Semifinals
8	(Kazakhstan) A Golubev	6	6
6	(Netherlands) J Huta Galung	2	4

=== Bottom half ===
First round
5	(France) J Ouanna	4	3
(Argentina) M González	6	6
(Kazakhstan) E Korolev	6	4	2
(Italy) G Naso	4	6	6
(Brazil) A Ghem	4	2
WC	(Germany) A Beck	6	6
(Kazakhstan) M Kukushkin	3	6	5
3	(Chile) P Capdeville	6	1	7
7	(Slovakia) A Martin	7^{8}	7^{7}
(Czech Republic) J Mertl	6^{6}	6^{5}
(Canada) F Dancevic	3	6	6
(Chile) J Aguilar	6	3	2
WC	(Germany) D Schulz	6	7^{7}
(Switzerland) S Ehrat	4	6^{4}
Q	(Germany) Y Hanfmann	6	6^{6}	4
2	(Argentina) DS Schwartzman	2	7^{8}	6

Second round
(Argentina) M González	7^{8}	6
(Italy) G Naso	6^{6}	4
WC	(Germany) A Beck	6	2	4
3	(Chile) P Capdeville	4	6	6
7	(Slovakia) A Martin	6	6
(Canada) F Dancevic	4	2
WC	(Germany) D Schulz	2	1
2	(Argentina) DS Schwartzman	6	6

Quarterfinals
(Argentina) M González	7	4	6
3	(Chile) P Capdeville	5	6	1
7	(Slovakia) A Martin	3	3
2	(Argentina) DS Schwartzman	6	6

Semifinals
(Argentina) M González	2	2
2	(Argentina) DS Schwartzman	6	6
