= 2012 Marburg Open – Doubles =

Doubles
- 2012 Marburg Open

Final
- Champions: (Poland) Mateusz Kowalczyk (Czech Republic) David Škoch
- Runners-up: (Russia) Denis Matsukevich (Germany) Mischa Zverev
- Score: 6–2, 6–1

Events
Singles	Doubles
← 2011 ·	Marburg Open	· 2013 →

Federico del Bonis and Horacio Zeballos were the defending champions but del Bonis decided not to participate.
Zeballos played alongside Ariel Behar but lost in the first round.
Mateusz Kowalczyk and David Škoch defeated Denis Matsukevich and Mischa Zverev 6–2, 6–1 in the final to win the title.

== Seeds ==
1. (Poland) Tomasz Bednarek / (Ukraine) Denys Molchanov (quarterfinals)
2. (France) Olivier Charroin / (Australia) Rameez Junaid (first round)
3. (Poland) Mateusz Kowalczyk / (Czech Republic) David Škoch (champions)
4. (Moldova) Radu Albot / (Belarus) Uladzimir Ignatik (quarterfinals)

== Draw ==
=== Key ===
- Q = Qualifier
- WC = Wild card
- LL = Lucky loser
- Alt = Alternate
- SE = Special exempt
- PR = Protected ranking
- ITF = ITF entry
- JE = Junior exempt
- w/o = Walkover
- r = Retired
- d = Defaulted
- SR = Special ranking

=== Draw ===
First round
1	(Poland) T Bednarek (Ukraine) D Molchanov	6	6
WC	(Germany) Julian Lenz (New Zealand) A Sitak	4	4
Alt	(Spain) D Gimeno-Traver (Spain) Israel Sevilla	2	3
(Slovenia) A Bedene (Slovakia) A Martin	6	6
4	(Moldova) R Albot (Belarus) U Ignatik	7^{7}	6
(Brazil) Rodrigo Grilli (Brazil) J Silva	6^{3}	2
(Slovakia) P Červenák (Switzerland) M Lammer	5	6^{10}
(Russia) D Matsukevich (Germany) M Zverev	7	7^{12}
(Germany) A Satschko (India) D Sharan	6	6
(Japan) Hiroki Moriya (Australia) Nima Roshan	3	4
(Uruguay) A Behar (Argentina) H Zeballos	3	7	[8]
3	(Poland) M Kowalczyk (Czech Republic) D Škoch	6	5	[10]
WC	(Germany) Steven Moneke (Germany) Tim Puetz	4	6	[7]
(Finland) H Heliövaara (Australia) Adam Hubble	6	0	[10]
WC	(Spain) I Navarro (Spain) G Trujillo-Soler	6	6
2	(France) O Charroin (Australia) R Junaid	4	4

Quarterfinals
1	(Poland) T Bednarek (Ukraine) D Molchanov	4	2
(Slovenia) A Bedene (Slovakia) A Martin	6	6
4	(Moldova) R Albot (Belarus) U Ignatik	1	3
(Russia) D Matsukevich (Germany) M Zverev	6	6
(Germany) A Satschko (India) D Sharan	4	4
3	(Poland) M Kowalczyk (Czech Republic) D Škoch	6	6
(Finland) H Heliövaara (Australia) Adam Hubble	3	6	[3]
WC	(Spain) I Navarro (Spain) G Trujillo-Soler	6	3	[10]

Semifinals
(Slovenia) A Bedene (Slovakia) A Martin
(Russia) D Matsukevich (Germany) M Zverev	w/o
3	(Poland) M Kowalczyk (Czech Republic) D Škoch	7	4	[10]
WC	(Spain) I Navarro (Spain) G Trujillo-Soler	5	6	[3]

Final
(Russia) D Matsukevich (Germany) M Zverev	2	1
3	(Poland) M Kowalczyk (Czech Republic) D Škoch	6	6
