= 2017 Marburg Open =

- Date: 3–8 July
- Edition: 8th
- Draw: 32S / 16D
- Surface: Clay
- Location: Marburg, Germany

Champions

Singles
- (Serbia) Filip Krajinović

Doubles
- (Argentina) Máximo González / (Brazil) Fabrício Neis
- Marburg Open

The 2017 Marburg Open was a professional tennis tournament played on clay courts. It was the eighth edition of the tournament which was part of the 2017 ATP Challenger Tour. It took place in Marburg, Germany between 3 and 8 July 2017.

== Singles main-draw entrants ==
=== Seeds ===
Country	Player	Rank^{1}	Seed
NOR	Casper Ruud	109	1
ARG	Guido Pella	114	2
BEL	Arthur De Greef	115	3
BLR	Uladzimir Ignatik	135	4
CZE	Jan Šátral	142	5
ESP	Guillermo García López	143	6
SVK	Andrej Martin	148	7
ITA	Federico Gaio	162	8

- ^{1} Rankings are as of 26 June 2017.

=== Other entrants ===
The following players received wildcards into the singles main draw:

- (Spain) Jaime Fermosell Delgado
- (Germany) Benjamin Hassan
- (Germany) Julian Lenz
- (Germany) Kai Wehnelt

The following players received entry from the qualifying draw:

- (Germany) Matthias Bachinger
- (Austria) David Pichler
- (Germany) Tim Pütz
- (Brazil) João Pedro Sorgi

== Champions ==
=== Singles ===
- (Serbia) Filip Krajinović def. (Germany) Cedrik-Marcel Stebe 6–2, 6–3.

=== Doubles ===
- (Argentina) Máximo González / (Brazil) Fabrício Neis def. (Australia) Rameez Junaid / (South Africa) Ruan Roelofse 6–3, 7–6^{(7–4)}.
