= 2015 Marburg Open – Singles =

Singles
- 2015 Marburg Open

Final
- Champion: (Spain) Íñigo Cervantes
- Runner-up: (Germany) Nils Langer
- Score: 2–6, 7–6^{(7–3)}, 6–3

Events
| Singles | Doubles |
| ← 2014 · | Marburg Open | · 2016 → |

Horacio Zeballos was the defending champion, but he did not participate this year.

Íñigo Cervantes won the title defeating Nils Langer in the final, 2–6, 7–6^{(7–3)}, 6–3.

== Seeds ==
1. (Japan) Taro Daniel (first round)
2. (France) Paul-Henri Mathieu (second round)
3. (Uzbekistan) Farrukh Dustov (first round)
4. (Kazakhstan) Andrey Golubev (first round)
5. (Spain) Íñigo Cervantes (champion)
6. (Estonia) Jürgen Zopp (first round)
7. (Argentina) Renzo Olivo (first round)
8. (Germany) Tobias Kamke (second round)

== Draw ==
=== Key ===
- Q = Qualifier
- WC = Wild card
- LL = Lucky loser
- Alt = Alternate
- SE = Special exempt
- PR = Protected ranking
- ITF = ITF entry
- JE = Junior exempt
- w/o = Walkover
- r = Retired
- d = Defaulted
- SR = Special ranking

=== Finals ===
Semifinals
(Russia) Karen Khachanov | 6^{2} | 4
5 | (Spain) Íñigo Cervantes | 7^{7} | 6
(Germany) Nils Langer | 6 | 6
WC | (Germany) Daniel Brands | 2 | 4

Final
5 | (Spain) Íñigo Cervantes | 2 | 7^{7} | 6
(Germany) Nils Langer | 6 | 6^{3} | 3

=== Top half ===
First round
1 | (Japan) T Daniel | 6 | 3 | 4
(Bosnia and Herzegovina) M Bašić | 3 | 6 | 6
WC | (Germany) D Masur | 2 | 6^{5}
(Belarus) U Ignatik | 6 | 7^{7}
(Russia) K Khachanov | 6 | 6
PR | (Spain) P Riba | 4 | 4
(Germany) T Pütz | 4 | 1
8 | (Germany) T Kamke | 6 | 6
4 | (Kazakhstan) A Golubev | 4 | 7^{7} | 3
(France) G Mina | 6 | 6^{3} | 6
Q | (Czech Republic) J Šátral | 6^{6} | 6 | 6
Q | (Russia) E Donskoy | 7^{8} | 4 | 3
LL | (Italy) L Giustino | 3 | 1
(Germany) A Beck | 6 | 6
WC | (Germany) J Choinski | 3 | 4
5 | (Spain) Í Cervantes | 6 | 6

Second round
(Bosnia and Herzegovina) M Bašić | 3 | 7^{10} | 7^{7}
(Belarus) U Ignatik | 6 | 6^{8} | 6^{2}
(Russia) K Khachanov | 5 | 7^{7} | 6
8 | (Germany) T Kamke | 7 | 6^{2} | 3
(France) G Mina | 2 | 2
Q | (Czech Republic) J Šátral | 6 | 6
(Germany) A Beck | 2 | 6 | 2
5 | (Spain) Í Cervantes | 6 | 3 | 6

Quarterfinals
(Bosnia and Herzegovina) M Bašić | 0 | 5
(Russia) K Khachanov | 6 | 7
Q | (Czech Republic) J Šátral | 6 | 3 | 2
5 | (Spain) Í Cervantes | 1 | 6 | 6

Semifinals
(Russia) K Khachanov | 6^{2} | 4
5 | (Spain) Í Cervantes | 7^{7} | 6

=== Bottom half ===
First round
6 | (Estonia) J Zopp | 6^{5} | 3
(Germany) N Langer | 7^{7} | 6
(Australia) J Kubler | 6 | 6
(Poland) G Panfil | 2 | 3
Q | (Russia) M Ledovskikh | 7^{10} | 4 | 6
(Serbia) L Djere | 6^{8} | 6 | 4
Q | (Belgium) A De Greef | 6 | 6
3 | (Uzbekistan) F Dustov | 3 | 2
7 | (Argentina) R Olivo | 4 | 4
WC | (Germany) D Brands | 6 | 6
(Belgium) M Authom | 3 | 4
(Ecuador) G Lapentti | 6 | 6
SE | (Brazil) R Dutra Silva | 6 | 6
(Slovakia) J Kovalík | 4 | 0
WC | (Germany) J Lenz | 6 | 3 | 3
2 | (France) P-H Mathieu | 4 | 6 | 6

Second round
(Germany) N Langer | 7^{7} | 6
(Australia) J Kubler | 6^{4} | 3
Q | (Russia) M Ledovskikh | 6^{2} | 6^{5}
Q | (Belgium) A De Greef | 7^{7} | 7^{7}
WC | (Germany) D Brands | 4 | 6 | 6
(Ecuador) G Lapentti | 6 | 4 | 4
SE | (Brazil) R Dutra Silva | 6
2 | (France) P-H Mathieu | 3^{r}

Quarterfinals
(Germany) N Langer | 7^{7}
Q | (Belgium) A De Greef | 6^{1} | r
WC | (Germany) D Brands | 6 | 6
SE | (Brazil) R Dutra Silva | 3 | 2

Semifinals
(Germany) N Langer | 6 | 6
WC | (Germany) D Brands | 2 | 4
