= 2014 Marburg Open – Singles =

Singles
- 2014 Marburg Open

Final
- Champion: (Argentina) Horacio Zeballos
- Runner-up: (Netherlands) Thiemo de Bakker
- Score: 3–6, 6–3, 6–3

Events
| Singles | Doubles |
| ← 2013 · | Marburg Open | · 2015 → |

Andrey Golubev was the defending champion, but decided not to participate.

Horacio Zeballos won the title, defeating Thiemo de Bakker in the final, 3–6, 6–3, 6–3.

== Seeds ==
1. (Argentina) Diego Schwartzman (quarterfinals)
2. (Brazil) Thomaz Bellucci (second round)
3. (Germany) Andreas Beck (semifinals)
4. (Brazil) João Souza (semifinals)
5. (Argentina) Horacio Zeballos (champion)
6. (Netherlands) Thiemo de Bakker (final)
7. (Portugal) Gastão Elias (first round)
8. (Romania) Marius Copil (second round)

== Draw ==
=== Key ===
- Q = Qualifier
- WC = Wild card
- LL = Lucky loser
- Alt = Alternate
- SE = Special exempt
- PR = Protected ranking
- ITF = ITF entry
- JE = Junior exempt
- w/o = Walkover
- r = Retired
- d = Defaulted
- SR = Special ranking

=== Finals ===
Semifinals
5 | (Argentina) Horacio Zeballos | 6 | 6
3 | (Germany) Andreas Beck | 3 | 4
4 | (Brazil) João Souza | 5 | 3
6 | (Netherlands) Thiemo de Bakker | 7 | 6

Final
5 | (Argentina) Horacio Zeballos | 3 | 6 | 6
6 | (Netherlands) Thiemo de Bakker | 6 | 3 | 3

=== Top half ===
First round
1 | (Argentina) D Schwartzmann | 7 | 6
(Belgium) Y Mertens | 5 | 2
(France) V Millot | 7^{7} | 3 | 1^{r}
(Brazil) A Ghem | 6^{2} | 6 | 4
Q | (Slovakia) J Kovalík | 6 | 6
WC | (Serbia) N Milojević | 3 | 1
WC | (Germany) A Zverev | 6^{7} | 3
5 | (Argentina) H Zeballos | 7^{9} | 6
3 | (Germany) A Beck | 6 | 5 | 6
WC | (Germany) R Becker | 4 | 7 | 3
(Spain) D Muñoz de la Nava | 7 | 6
WC | (Germany) J Lenz | 5 | 3
Q | (Chile) C Garin | 5 | 1
(Spain) R Carballés Baena | 7 | 6
Q | (Croatia) F Škugor | 3 | 6^{3}
8 | (Romania) M Copil | 6 | 7^{7}

Second round
1 | (Argentina) D Schwartzmann | 4 | 6 | 6
(Brazil) A Ghem | 6 | 3 | 0
Q | (Slovakia) J Kovalík | 4 | 2
5 | (Argentina) H Zeballos | 6 | 6
3 | (Germany) A Beck | 6 | 6
(Spain) D Muñoz de la Nava | 3 | 3
(Spain) R Carballés Baena | 7^{7} | 4 | 6
8 | (Romania) M Copil | 6^{3} | 6 | 1

Quarterfinals
1 | (Argentina) D Schwartzmann | 3 | 5
5 | (Argentina) H Zeballos | 6 | 7
3 | (Germany) A Beck | 6 | 6
(Spain) R Carballés Baena | 4 | 3

Semifinals
5 | (Argentina) H Zeballos | 6 | 6
3 | (Germany) A Beck | 3 | 4

=== Bottom half ===
First round
7 | (Portugal) G Elias | 5 | 5
(Argentina) M Alund | 7 | 7
(France) Julien Obry | 6 | 6
(Russia) Alexander Lobkov | 3 | 2
Q | (Serbia) B Pašanski | 7^{9} | 6
(Belarus) U Ignatik | 6^{7} | 3
(Italy) L Giustino | 6^{6} | 2
4 | (Brazil) J Souza | 7^{8} | 6
6 | (Netherlands) T de Bakker | 6 | 6
(Czech Republic) A Pavlásek | 2 | 2
(Czech Republic) J Pospíšil | 4 | 3
(Georgia (country)) N Basilashvili | 6 | 6
(Chile) H Podlipnik-Castillo | 4 | 4
(Switzerland) H Laaksonen | 6 | 6
(Venezuela) R Rodríguez | 0 | 2
2 | (Brazil) T Bellucci | 6 | 6

Second round
(Argentina) M Alund | 6 | 2
(France) J Obry | 1 | 0^{r}
Q | (Serbia) B Pašanski | 6^{5} | 6^{5}
4 | (Brazil) J Souza | 7^{7} | 7^{7}
6 | (Netherlands) T de Bakker
(Georgia (country)) N Basilashvili | w/o
(Switzerland) H Laaksonen | 6 | 3 | 7^{7}
2 | (Brazil) T Bellucci | 3 | 6 | 6^{4}

Quarterfinals
(Argentina) M Alund | 2 | 3
4 | (Brazil) J Souza | 6 | 6
6 | (Netherlands) T de Bakker | 7 | 6
(Switzerland) H Laaksonen | 5 | 2

Semifinals
4 | (Brazil) J Souza | 5 | 3
6 | (Netherlands) T de Bakker | 7 | 6
