= 2012 Marburg Open – Singles =

Singles
- 2012 Marburg Open

Final
- Champion: (Czech Republic) Jan Hájek
- Runner-up: (Austria) Andreas Haider-Maurer
- Score: 6–2, 6–2

Events
Singles	Doubles
← 2011 ·	Marburg Open	· 2013 →

The 2012 Marburg Open was a professional tennis tournament played on hard courts. It was the third edition of the tournament which was part of the 2012 ATP Challenger Tour. It took place in Marburg, Germany between 25 June and 1 July 2012.

Björn Phau was the defending champion but chose to compete in Wimbledon instead.
Jan Hájek won the tournament by defeating Andreas Haider-Maurer 6–2, 6–2 in the final.

== Seeds ==
1. (Argentina) Horacio Zeballos (quarterfinals)
2. (Spain) Daniel Gimeno-Traver (second round)
3. (Czech Republic) Jan Hájek (champion)
4. (Slovenia) Aljaž Bedene (first round)
5. (Russia) Teymuraz Gabashvili (quarterfinals)
6. (Brazil) Júlio Silva (second round)
7. (Portugal) Gastão Elias (first round)
8. (Austria) Andreas Haider-Maurer (final)

== Draw ==
=== Key ===
- Q = Qualifier
- WC = Wild card
- LL = Lucky loser
- Alt = Alternate
- SE = Special exempt
- PR = Protected ranking
- ITF = ITF entry
- JE = Junior exempt
- w/o = Walkover
- r = Retired
- d = Defaulted
- SR = Special ranking

=== Finals ===
Semifinals
(Romania) Marius Copil	3	6	3
3	(Czech Republic) Jan Hájek	6	3	6
8	(Austria) Andreas Haider-Maurer	7	6
(Spain) Javier Martí	5	4

Finals
3	(Czech Republic) Jan Hájek	6	6
8	(Austria) Andreas Haider-Maurer	2	2

=== Top half ===
First round
1	(Argentina) H Zeballos	6	4	6
Q	(Germany) Tim Puetz	3	6	0
(Finland) H Heliövaara	3	1
(Slovakia) P Červenák	6	6
(Spain) I Navarro	6	6
(Japan) Hiroki Moriya	4	3
(Romania) M Copil	3	6	6
7	(Portugal) G Elias	6	3	1
3	(Czech Republic) J Hájek	7	3	6
Q	(Belarus) U Ignatik	5	6	0
(Czech Republic) D Lojda	6	4	5
(Romania) V Crivoi	1	6	7
(Portugal) P Sousa	4	2
WC	(Germany) K Krawietz	6	6
Q	(Sweden) Markus Eriksson	2	5
5	(Russia) T Gabashvili	6	7

Second round
1	(Argentina) H Zeballos	6	7
(Slovakia) P Červenák	2	5
(Spain) I Navarro	3	1
(Romania) M Copil	6	6
3	(Czech Republic) J Hájek	7^{7}	7^{7}
(Romania) V Crivoi	6^{4}	6^{3}
WC	(Germany) K Krawietz	4	4
5	(Russia) T Gabashvili	6	6

Quarterfinals
1	(Argentina) H Zeballos	6^{4}	7^{7}	1
(Romania) M Copil	7^{7}	6^{2}	6
3	(Czech Republic) J Hájek	6	6
5	(Russia) T Gabashvili	4	4

Semifinals
(Romania) M Copil	3	6	3
3	(Czech Republic) J Hájek	6	3	6

=== Bottom half ===
First round
8	(Austria) A Haider-Maurer	6^{6}	6	6
(Italy) S Vagnozzi	7^{8}	4	2
(France) V Millot	4	1
(Moldova) R Albot	6	6
(Switzerland) M Lammer	7^{7}	6
WC	(Germany) Constantin Christ	6^{4}	3
(Germany) S Greul	6	7
4	(Slovenia) A Bedene	4	5
6	(Brazil) J Silva	6	6
WC	(Germany) Robin Kern	2	3
WC	(Germany) Julian Lenz	7	2^{r}
(Spain) J Martí	5	6
(Germany) M Zverev	6	7
(Germany) D Gremelmayr	2	5
Q	(Germany) Nils Langer	2	4
2	(Spain) D Gimeno-Traver	6	6

Second round
8	(Austria) A Haider-Maurer	6	6
(Moldova) R Albot	2	1
(Switzerland) M Lammer	0^{r}
(Germany) S Greul	6
6	(Brazil) J Silva	0	4
(Spain) J Martí	6	6
(Germany) M Zverev	4	7^{7}	7^{7}
2	(Spain) D Gimeno-Traver	6	6^{5}	6^{5}

Quarterfinals
8	(Austria) A Haider-Maurer	6	6
(Germany) S Greul	3	4
(Spain) J Martí	3	6	6
(Germany) M Zverev	6	4	2

Semifinals
8	(Austria) A Haider-Maurer	7	6
(Spain) J Martí	5	4
