= 2013 Marburg Open – Doubles =

Doubles
- 2013 Marburg Open

Final
- Champions: (Kazakhstan) Andrey Golubev (Kazakhstan) Evgeny Korolev
- Runners-up: (Netherlands) Jesse Huta Galung (Australia) Jordan Kerr
- Score: 6–3, 1–6, [10–6]

Events
Singles	Doubles
← 2012 ·	Marburg Open	· 2014 →

Mateusz Kowalczyk and David Škoch were the defending champions, but decided not to participate.
Andrey Golubev and Evgeny Korolev defeated Jesse Huta Galung and Jordan Kerr 6–3, 1–6, [10–6] in the final.

== Seeds ==
1. (Italy) Stefano Ianni / (Chinese Taipei) Lee Hsin-han (quarterfinals)
2. (Netherlands) Jesse Huta Galung / (Australia) Jordan Kerr (final)
3. (Philippines) Ruben Gonzales / (Chinese Taipei) Peng Hsien-yin (second round)
4. (Italy) Alessandro Motti / (Italy) Matteo Volante (first round)

== Draw ==
=== Key ===
- Q = Qualifier
- WC = Wild card
- LL = Lucky loser
- Alt = Alternate
- SE = Special exempt
- PR = Protected ranking
- ITF = ITF entry
- JE = Junior exempt
- w/o = Walkover
- r = Retired
- d = Defaulted
- SR = Special ranking

=== Draw ===
First round
1	(Italy) S Ianni (Chinese Taipei) H-h Lee	6	6
WC	(Germany) Jannis Kahlke (Slovenia) Tadej Turk	3	2
(Kazakhstan) A Golubev (Kazakhstan) E Korolev	6	6
(Slovakia) N Gombos (Croatia) M Pavić	4	4
4	(Italy) A Motti (Italy) Matteo Volante	4	4
(Argentina) R Olivo (Argentina) DS Schwartzman	6	6
(Slovakia) A Martin (Serbia) G Tošić	6^{2}	3	13
(Germany) G Kretschmer (Germany) A Satschko	7^{7}	6	[15]
PR	(New Zealand) A Sitak (Netherlands) R Wassen	4	6^{0}
(United States) V Mirzadeh (United States) D Zivkovic	6	7^{7}
WC	(Germany) Jan Beusch (North Macedonia) L Magdinčev	4	1
3	(Philippines) R Gonzales (Chinese Taipei) H-y Peng	6	6
(Chile) J Aguilar (Chile) P Capdeville	6	6
WC	(Germany) N Langer (Germany) Marko Zelch	1	0
(Italy) A Giannessi (Italy) G Naso	3	7^{7}	[4]
2	(Netherlands) J Huta Galung (Australia) J Kerr	6	6^{2}	[10]

Quarterfinals
1	(Italy) S Ianni (Chinese Taipei) H-h Lee	7	6^{7}	[2]
(Kazakhstan) A Golubev (Kazakhstan) E Korolev	5	7^{9}	[10]
(Argentina) R Olivo (Argentina) DS Schwartzman	7^{7}	1	[10]
(Slovakia) A Martin (Serbia) G Tošić	6^{1}	6	[4]
(United States) V Mirzadeh (United States) D Zivkovic	6	6^{6}	[11]
3	(Philippines) R Gonzales (Chinese Taipei) H-y Peng	2	7^{8}	[9]
(Chile) J Aguilar (Chile) P Capdeville	0	7^{8}	[8]
2	(Netherlands) J Huta Galung (Australia) J Kerr	6	6^{6}	[10]

Semifinals
(Kazakhstan) A Golubev (Kazakhstan) E Korolev	6	6
(Argentina) R Olivo (Argentina) DS Schwartzman	2	2
(United States) V Mirzadeh (United States) D Zivkovic	7	2	[6]
2	(Netherlands) J Huta Galung (Australia) J Kerr	5	6	[10]

Final
(Kazakhstan) A Golubev (Kazakhstan) E Korolev	6	1	[10]
2	(Netherlands) J Huta Galung (Australia) J Kerr	3	6	[6]
