= 2010 Marburg Open =

- Date: June 21 – June 27
- Edition: 12th
- Location: Marburg, Germany

Champions

Singles
- (Italy) Simone Vagnozzi

Doubles
- (Germany) Matthias Bachinger / (Germany) Denis Gremelmayr
- Marburg Open

The 2010 Marburg Open was a professional tennis tournament played on outdoor red clay courts. It was part of the 2010 ATP Challenger Tour. It took place in Marburg, Germany between 21 and 27 June 2010.

== ATP entrants ==
=== Seeds ===
Nationality	Player	Ranking*	Seeding
SVN	Grega Žemlja	113	1
KAZ	Mikhail Kukushkin	117	2
ESP	Albert Ramos-Viñolas	140	3
BEL	Christophe Rochus	158	4
ROU	Victor Crivoi	175	5
UKR	Ivan Sergeyev	181	6
GER	~~Dominik Meffert~~	~~186~~	~~7~~
ARG	Gastón Gaudio	195	8

- Rankings are as of June 14, 2010.

=== Other entrants ===
The following players received wildcards into the singles main draw:

- (Germany) Matthias Bachinger
- (Germany) Peter Gojowczyk
- (Germany) Sebastian Rieschick
- (Germany) Cedrik-Marcel Stebe

The following players received entry from the qualifying draw:

- (Belarus) Aliaksandr Bury
- (Bulgaria) Grigor Dimitrov
- (Germany) Gero Kretschmer
- (France) Guillaume Rufin

The following players received lucky loser spots:

- (Russia) Ilya Belyaev
- (Republic of Ireland) Conor Niland

== Champions ==
=== Singles ===
(Italy) Simone Vagnozzi def. (Czech Republic) Ivo Minář, 2–6, 6–3, 7–5

=== Doubles ===
(Germany) Matthias Bachinger / (Germany) Denis Gremelmayr def. (Spain) Guillermo Olaso / (Slovenia) Grega Žemlja, 6–4, 6–4
