= 2017 Marburg Open – Singles =

Singles
- 2017 Marburg Open

Final
- Champion: (Serbia) Filip Krajinović
- Runner-up: (Germany) Cedrik-Marcel Stebe
- Score: 6–2, 6–3

Events
Singles	Doubles
- Marburg Open

Jan Šátral was the defending champion but lost in the first round to Benjamin Bonzi.

Filip Krajinović won the title after defeating Cedrik-Marcel Stebe 6–2, 6–3 in the final.

== Seeds ==
1. (Norway) Casper Ruud (second round)
2. (Argentina) Guido Pella (first round)
3. (Belgium) Arthur De Greef (semifinals)
4. (Belarus) Uladzimir Ignatik (second round)
5. (Czech Republic) Jan Šátral (first round)
6. (Spain) Guillermo García López (semifinals)
7. (Slovakia) Andrej Martin (second round)
8. (Italy) Federico Gaio (first round)

== Draw ==
Key

- Q = Qualifier
- WC = Wild card
- LL = Lucky loser
- Alt = Alternate
- ITF = ITF entry
- PR = Protected ranking
- SR = Special ranking
- SE = Special exempt
- JE = Junior exempt
- JR = Junior Accelerator Programme entrant
- CO = College Accelerator Programme entrant
- NG = Next Gen Accelerator Program entrant
- w/o = Walkover
- r = Retired
- d = Defaulted

=== Finals ===
Semifinals
(Germany) Cedrik-Marcel Stebe	6	6
3	(Belgium) Arthur De Greef	4	4
6	(Spain) Guillermo García López	5	4
(Serbia) Filip Krajinović	7	6

Final
(Germany) Cedrik-Marcel Stebe	2	3
(Serbia) Filip Krajinović	6	6

=== Top half ===
First round
1	(Norway) C Ruud	6	6^{4}	6
Q	(Germany) T Pütz	2	7^{7}	2
(Hungary) A Balázs	5	1
(Germany) Y Hanfmann	7	6
(Germany) C-M Stebe	6	7^{8}
WC	(Germany) J Lenz	3	6^{6}
(France) C Hemery	4	6	6
8	(Italy) F Gaio	6	3	1
3	(Belgium) A De Greef	7	6
WC	(Germany) B Hassan	5	3
(Spain) R Ramírez Hidalgo	2	6	1
(Argentina) M González	6	3	6
(Argentina) F Coria	6	5	1
(Czech Republic) V Šafránek	4	7	6
(France) B Bonzi	6	6
5	(Czech Republic) J Šátral	4	1

Second round
1	(Norway) C Ruud	4	6^{1}
(Germany) Y Hanfmann	6	7^{7}
(Germany) C-M Stebe	7^{12}	7^{7}
(France) C Hemery	6^{10}	6^{5}
3	(Belgium) A De Greef	7	7
(Argentina) M González	5	5
(Czech Republic) V Šafránek	3	6	4
(France) B Bonzi	6	4	6

Quarterfinals
(Germany) Y Hanfmann	4	3
(Germany) C-M Stebe	6	6
3	(Belgium) A De Greef	6	7
(France) B Bonzi	2	5

Semifinals
(Germany) C-M Stebe	6	6
3	(Belgium) A De Greef	4	4

=== Bottom half ===
First round
6	(Spain) G García López	4	7	7^{9}
Q	(Austria) D Pichler	6	5	6^{7}
(Belgium) Y Reuter	6	1	4
(Italy) R Bellotti	2	6	6
Q	(Brazil) JP Sorgi	6^{4}	6	7^{7}
(Italy) L Giustino	7^{7}	3	6^{2}
(Spain) T Robredo	6^{6}	5
4	(Belarus) U Ignatik	7^{8}	7
7	(Slovakia) A Martin	6	6
WC	(Germany) K Wehnelt	3	3
WC	(Spain) Jaime Fermosell Delgado	3	1
(Serbia) F Krajinović	6	6
Q	(Germany) M Bachinger	6	6
(Spain) E López-Pérez	3	3
(Germany) O Otte	6	6
2	(Argentina) G Pella	4	3

Second round
6	(Spain) G García López	7	1	6
(Italy) R Bellotti	5	6	2
Q	(Brazil) JP Sorgi	7^{7}	6
4	(Belarus) U Ignatik	6^{1}	2
7	(Slovakia) A Martin	2	4
(Serbia) F Krajinović	6	6
Q	(Germany) M Bachinger	2	6	6
(Germany) O Otte	6	3	3

Quarterfinals
6	(Spain) G García López	6	4	6
Q	(Brazil) JP Sorgi	4	6	3
(Serbia) F Krajinović	7	6
Q	(Germany) M Bachinger	5	1

Semifinals
6	(Spain) G García López	5	4
(Serbia) F Krajinović	7	6
