= 2016 Marburg Open – Doubles =

Doubles
- 2016 Marburg Open

Final
- Champions: (United States) James Cerretani (Austria) Philipp Oswald
- Runners-up: (Mexico) Miguel Ángel Reyes-Varela (United States) Max Schnur
- Score: 6–3, 6–2

Events
| Singles | Doubles |
- Marburg Open

Wesley Koolhof and Matwé Middelkoop were the defending champions but chose not to defend their title.

James Cerretani and Philipp Oswald won the title after defeating Miguel Ángel Reyes-Varela and Max Schnur 6–3, 6–2 in the final.

== Seeds ==
1. (United States) James Cerretani / (Austria) Philipp Oswald (champions)
2. (Poland) Tomasz Bednarek / (Belarus) Sergey Betov (semifinals)
3. (Brazil) Fabrício Neis / (South Africa) Ruan Roelofse (first round)
4. (Mexico) Miguel Ángel Reyes-Varela / (United States) Max Schnur (final)

== Draw ==
Key

- Q = Qualifier
- WC = Wild card
- LL = Lucky loser
- Alt = Alternate
- ITF = ITF entry
- PR = Protected ranking
- SR = Special ranking
- SE = Special exempt
- JE = Junior exempt
- JR = Junior Accelerator Programme entrant
- CO = College Accelerator Programme entrant
- NG = Next Gen Accelerator Program entrant
- w/o = Walkover
- r = Retired
- d = Defaulted

First round
1 | (United States) J Cerretani (Austria) P Oswald | 6 | 7^{7}
PR | (Germany) G Kretschmer (Germany) S Stadler | 2 | 6^{5}
WC | (Germany) Jan Beusch (Slovenia) Tadej Turk | 2 | 1
(China) M Gong (China) Z Zhang | 6 | 6
3 | (Brazil) F Neis (South Africa) R Roelofse | 6 | 6^{4} | [5]
(Poland) M Kowalczyk (Poland) A Majchrowicz | 4 | 7^{7} | [10]
(Italy) A Motti (Chinese Taipei) H-y Peng | 6 | 6
(Peru) S Galdós (Argentina) JI Londero | 4 | 3
Alt | (Italy) A Arnaboldi (Italy) F Gaio | 6 | 6^{5} | [10]
(Spain) E López-Pérez (Spain) D Pérez Sanz | 1 | 7^{7} | [7]
WC | (Croatia) I Sabanov (Croatia) M Sabanov | 6^{5} | 3
4 | (Mexico) MÁ Reyes-Varela (United States) M Schnur | 7^{7} | 6
(Germany) K Krawietz (Germany) N Langer | 4 | 5
(Argentina) N Kicker (Argentina) A Velotti | 6 | 7
WC | (Germany) J Lenz (Germany) A Mies | 5 | 4
2 | (Poland) T Bednarek (Belarus) S Betov | 7 | 6

Quarterfinals
1 | (United States) J Cerretani (Austria) P Oswald | 6 | 6
(China) M Gong (China) Z Zhang | 1 | 4
(Poland) M Kowalczyk (Poland) A Majchrowicz | 6^{3} | 4
(Italy) A Motti (Chinese Taipei) H-y Peng | 7^{7} | 6
Alt | (Italy) A Arnaboldi (Italy) F Gaio | 1 | 3
4 | (Mexico) MÁ Reyes-Varela (United States) M Schnur | 6 | 6
(Argentina) N Kicker (Argentina) A Velotti | 4 | 4
2 | (Poland) T Bednarek (Belarus) S Betov | 6 | 6

Semifinals
1 | (United States) J Cerretani (Austria) P Oswald | 6 | 3 | [14]
(Italy) A Motti (Chinese Taipei) H-y Peng | 2 | 6 | [12]
4 | (Mexico) MÁ Reyes-Varela (United States) M Schnur | 7 | 5 | [11]
2 | (Poland) T Bednarek (Belarus) S Betov | 5 | 7 | [9]

Final
1 | (United States) J Cerretani (Austria) P Oswald | 6 | 6
4 | (Mexico) MÁ Reyes-Varela (United States) M Schnur | 3 | 2
