= 2010 Marburg Open – Doubles =

Doubles
- 2010 Marburg Open

Final
- Champion: (Germany) Matthias Bachinger (Germany) Denis Gremelmayr
- Runner-up: (Spain) Guillermo Olaso (Slovenia) Grega Žemlja
- Score: 6–4, 6–4

Events
Singles	Doubles
- Marburg Open

Bastian Knittel and Sebastian Rieschick were the defending champions, but they chose not to compete together.
Knittel partnered up with Leonardo Tavares, but they lost in the second round against Guillermo Olaso and Grega Žemlja.
Rieschick partnered up with Srirambalaji Narayanaswamy, but they lost in the semifinals against Matthias Bachinger and Denis Gremelmayr.
Bachinger and Gremelmayer won in the final 6–4, 6–4 against Guillermo Olaso and Grega Žemlja.

== Seeds ==
1. (Australia) Rameez Junaid / (Spain) Gabriel Trujillo-Soler (first round)
2. (United States) Brian Battistone / (United States) Ryler DeHeart (semifinals)
3. (Italy) Marco Crugnola / (Italy) Simone Vagnozzi (quarterfinals)
4. (Germany) Bastian Knittel / (Portugal) Leonardo Tavares (quarterfinals)

== Main draw ==
Key

- Q = Qualifier
- WC = Wild card
- LL = Lucky loser
- Alt = Alternate
- ITF = ITF entry
- PR = Protected ranking
- SR = Special ranking
- SE = Special exempt
- JE = Junior exempt
- JR = Junior Accelerator Programme entrant
- CO = College Accelerator Programme entrant
- NG = Next Gen Accelerator Program entrant
- w/o = Walkover
- r = Retired
- d = Defaulted

=== Draw ===
First round
1	(Australia) R Junaid (Spain) G Trujillo-Soler	6	3	[12]
(Slovakia) P Červenák (Czech Republic) J Pospíšil	2	6	[14]
(Germany) M Bachinger (Germany) D Gremelmayr	w/o
WC	(Netherlands) S Groen (Germany) C Stebe
3	(Italy) M Crugnola (Italy) S Vagnozzi	1	6	[10]
(Russia) I Belyaev (Russia) D Matsukevich	6	4	[6]
(Spain) I Cervantes (Spain) P Clar-Rosselló	4	4
WC	(India) S Narayanaswamy (Germany) S Rieschick	6	6
(Kazakhstan) M Kukushkin (Russia) D Sitak	3	4
(Spain) G Olaso (Slovenia) G Žemlja	6	6
WC	(Germany) G Kretschmer (Germany) A Satschko	5	2
4	(Germany) B Knittel (Portugal) L Tavares	7	6
(Russia) K Kravchuk (Ukraine) I Sergeyev	7	6
(Republic of Ireland) C Niland (Sweden) A Siljeström	6^{7}	4
(Spain) D Muñoz (Spain) A Ramos-Viñolas	4	6^{2}
2	(United States) B Battistone (United States) R DeHeart	6	7

Quarterfinals
(Slovakia) P Červenák (Czech Republic) J Pospíšil	6	4	[4]
(Germany) M Bachinger (Germany) D Gremelmayr	2	6	[10]
3	(Italy) M Crugnola (Italy) S Vagnozzi	6^{8}	r
WC	(India) S Narayanaswamy (Germany) S Rieschick	7
(Spain) G Olaso (Slovenia) G Žemlja	4	6	[10]
4	(Germany) B Knittel (Portugal) L Tavares	6	4	[7]
(Russia) K Kravchuk (Ukraine) I Sergeyev	5	3
2	(United States) B Battistone (United States) R DeHeart	7	6

Semifinals
(Germany) M Bachinger (Germany) D Gremelmayr	6	7
WC	(India) S Narayanaswamy (Germany) S Rieschick	4	6^{1}
(Spain) G Olaso (Slovenia) G Žemlja	7	7
2	(United States) B Battistone (United States) R DeHeart	5	6^{4}

Final
(Germany) M Bachinger (Germany) D Gremelmayr	6	6
(Spain) G Olaso (Slovenia) G Žemlja	4	4
