= 2015 Marburg Open – Doubles =

Doubles
- 2015 Marburg Open

Final
- Champion: (Netherlands) Wesley Koolhof (Netherlands) Matwé Middelkoop
- Runner-up: (Germany) Tobias Kamke (Germany) Simon Stadler
- Score: 6–1, 7–5

Events
| Singles | Doubles |
- Marburg Open

Jaroslav Pospíšil and Franko Škugor were the defending champions, but they did not participate this year.

Wesley Koolhof and Matwé Middelkoop won the title, defeating Tobias Kamke and Simon Stadler in the final, 6–1, 7–5.

== Seeds ==
1. (Netherlands) Wesley Koolhof / (Netherlands) Matwé Middelkoop (champions)
2. (Czech Republic) Roman Jebavý / (Czech Republic) Jan Šátral (semifinals)
3. (Philippines) Ruben Gonzales / (South Africa) Ruan Roelofse (first round)
4. (Kazakhstan) Andrey Golubev / (France) Alexandre Sidorenko (semifinals)

== Draw ==
Key

- Q = Qualifier
- WC = Wild card
- LL = Lucky loser
- Alt = Alternate
- ITF = ITF entry
- PR = Protected ranking
- SR = Special ranking
- SE = Special exempt
- JE = Junior exempt
- JR = Junior Accelerator Programme entrant
- CO = College Accelerator Programme entrant
- NG = Next Gen Accelerator Program entrant
- w/o = Walkover
- r = Retired
- d = Defaulted

First round
1 | (Netherlands) W Koolhof (Netherlands) M Middelkoop | 5
WC | (Germany) J Choinski (Germany) Jannis Kahlke | 0^{r}
(Serbia) P Krstin (Ecuador) G Lapentti
WC | (Germany) Y Hanfmann (Germany) J Lenz | w/o
4 | (Kazakhstan) A Golubev (France) A Sidorenko | 6 | 6
(Belgium) M Authom (France) J Inzerillo | 2 | 1
(France) P-H Mathieu (France) A Michon | 2 | 6 | [4]
(Spain) Í Cervantes (Spain) P Riba | 6 | 3 | [10]
(Belarus) U Ignatik (Slovakia) J Kovalík | 4 | 2
(Germany) A Beck (Germany) T Pütz | 6 | 6
PR | (Germany) T Kamke (Germany) S Stadler | 6 | 6
3 | (Philippines) R Gonzales (South Africa) R Roelofse | 3 | 4
(Japan) T Daniel (Argentina) R Olivo | 6 | 6
WC | (Germany) Jan Beusch (North Macedonia) L Magdinčev | 4 | 1
(Serbia) I Bozoljac (Estonia) J Zopp | 2 | 4
2 | (Czech Republic) R Jebavý (Czech Republic) J Šátral | 6 | 6

Quarterfinals
1 | (Netherlands) W Koolhof (Netherlands) M Middelkoop | 6 | 6
WC | (Germany) Y Hanfmann (Germany) J Lenz | 1 | 4
4 | (Kazakhstan) A Golubev (France) A Sidorenko | 3 | 6 | [12]
(Spain) Í Cervantes (Spain) P Riba | 6 | 3 | [10]
(Germany) A Beck (Germany) T Pütz | 3 | 2
PR | (Germany) T Kamke (Germany) S Stadler | 6 | 6
(Japan) T Daniel (Argentina) R Olivo | 6 | 4 | [5]
2 | (Czech Republic) R Jebavý (Czech Republic) J Šátral | 2 | 6 | [10]

Semifinals
1 | (Netherlands) W Koolhof (Netherlands) M Middelkoop | 6 | 6
4 | (Kazakhstan) A Golubev (France) A Sidorenko | 3 | 4
PR | (Germany) T Kamke (Germany) S Stadler | 6 | 6
2 | (Czech Republic) R Jebavý (Czech Republic) J Šátral | 2 | 4

Final
1 | (Netherlands) W Koolhof (Netherlands) M Middelkoop | 6 | 7
PR | (Germany) T Kamke (Germany) S Stadler | 1 | 5
