= 2010 Marburg Open – Singles =

Singles
- 2010 Marburg Open

Final
- Champion: (Italy) Simone Vagnozzi
- Runner-up: (Czech Republic) Ivo Minář
- Score: 2–6, 6–3, 7–5

Events
Singles	Doubles
- Marburg Open

Nils Langer was the defending champion, but he chose not to compete this year.
Simone Vagnozzi won the final 2–6, 6–3, 7–5 against Ivo Minář.

== Seeds ==
1. (Slovenia) Grega Žemlja (second round)
2. (Kazakhstan) Mikhail Kukushkin (second round)
3. (Spain) Albert Ramos-Viñolas (second round)
4. (Belgium) Christophe Rochus (second round)
5. (Romania) Victor Crivoi (first round)
6. (Ukraine) Ivan Sergeyev (second round)
7. (Germany) Dominik Meffert (withdrew)
8. (Argentina) Gastón Gaudio (second round)

== Draw ==
Key

- Q = Qualifier
- WC = Wild card
- LL = Lucky loser
- Alt = Alternate
- ITF = ITF entry
- PR = Protected ranking
- SR = Special ranking
- SE = Special exempt
- JE = Junior exempt
- JR = Junior Accelerator Programme entrant
- CO = College Accelerator Programme entrant
- NG = Next Gen Accelerator Program entrant
- w/o = Walkover
- r = Retired
- d = Defaulted

=== Finals ===
Semifinals
Q	(Bulgaria) Grigor Dimitrov	2	6^{4}
(Italy) Simone Vagnozzi	6	7
(Czech Republic) Ivo Minář	6	6
SE	(Czech Republic) Jaroslav Pospíšil	3	0

Final
(Italy) Simone Vagnozzi	2	6	7
(Czech Republic) Ivo Minář	6	3	5

=== Top half ===
First round
1	(Slovenia) G Žemlja	6	6
(Germany) B Knittel	4	1
WC	(Germany) S Rieschick	3	2
Q	(Bulgaria) G Dimitrov	6	6
(Slovakia) P Červenák	6	6
LL	(Russia) I Belyaev	4	1
(Spain) I Cervantes	2	2
8	(Argentina) G Gaudio	6	6
3	(Spain) A Ramos-Viñolas	6	1	6
WC	(Germany) M Bachinger	4	6	3
(Italy) S Vagnozzi	4	6	6
(Switzerland) M Lammer	6	3	1
(Portugal) L Tavares	6^{6}	6^{9}
(Germany) D Gremelmayr	7	7
(Spain) G Olaso	4	5
LL	(Republic of Ireland) C Niland	6	7

Second round
1	(Slovenia) G Žemlja	6	3	6^{0}
Q	(Bulgaria) G Dimitrov	3	6	7
(Slovakia) P Červenák	7	6
8	(Argentina) G Gaudio	6^{3}	3
3	(Spain) A Ramos-Viñolas	7	4	1
(Italy) S Vagnozzi	6^{7}	6	6
(Germany) D Gremelmayr	0	7	4
LL	(Republic of Ireland) C Niland	6	6^{4}	6

Quarterfinals
Q	(Bulgaria) G Dimitrov	6	7
(Slovakia) P Červenák	3	6^{3}
(Italy) S Vagnozzi	6	6
LL	(Republic of Ireland) C Niland	4	2

Semifinals
Q	(Bulgaria) G Dimitrov	2	6^{4}
(Italy) S Vagnozzi	6	7

=== Bottom half ===
First round
6	(Ukraine) I Sergeyev	6	6
(Russia) K Kravchuk	2	4
Q	(Belarus) A Bury	0	5
Q	(France) G Rufin	6	7
(Czech Republic) I Minář	6	7
WC	(Germany) P Gojowczyk	3	6^{6}
(France) B Paire	2	7	6^{3}
4	(Belgium) C Rochus	6	5	7
5	(Romania) V Crivoi	3	3
SE	(Czech Republic) J Pospíšil	6	6
(United States) R DeHeart	7	7
(Germany) G Kretschmer	5	5
(Spain) D Muñoz-De La Nava	6	7
SE	(Poland) J Janowicz	3	5
(Spain) P Clar-Rosselló	1	4
2	(Kazakhstan) M Kukushkin	6	6

Second round
6	(Ukraine) I Sergeyev	4	3
Q	(France) G Rufin	6	6
(Czech Republic) I Minář	6	6
4	(Belgium) C Rochus	2	3
SE	(Czech Republic) J Pospíšil	5	6	6
(United States) R DeHeart	7	3	3
(Spain) D Muñoz-De La Nava	6	4	6
2	(Kazakhstan) M Kukushkin	3	6	3

Quarterfinals
Q	(France) G Rufin	6^{8}	3
(Czech Republic) I Minář	7	6
SE	(Czech Republic) J Pospíšil	6	6
(Spain) D Muñoz-De La Nava	3	2

Semifinals
(Czech Republic) I Minář	6	6
SE	(Czech Republic) J Pospíšil	3	0
