= Marburg Open =

- 2018 Marburg Open

ATP Challenger Tour
- Location: Marburg, Germany
- Venue: TV 1965 Marburg
- Category: ATP Challenger Tour
- Surface: Clay
- Draw: 32S/29Q/16D
- Prize money: €42,500+H
- Website: marburg-open.de

The Marburg Open is a professional tennis tournament played on outdoor red clay courts. It was held annually in Marburg, Germany. It was part of the Association of Tennis Professionals (ATP) Challenger Tour from 2010 until 2018, and subsequently is held as a Futures event.

== Past finals ==
=== Singles ===
Year	Champions	Runners-up	Score
2018	(Argentina) Juan Ignacio Londero	(Bolivia) Hugo Dellien	3–6, 7–5, 6–4
2017	(Serbia) Filip Krajinović	(Germany) Cedrik-Marcel Stebe	6–2, 6–3
2016	(Czech Republic) Jan Šátral	(Argentina) Marco Trungelliti	6–2, 6–4
2015	(Spain) Íñigo Cervantes	(Germany) Nils Langer	2–6, 7–6^{(7–3)}, 6–3
2014	(Argentina) Horacio Zeballos	(Netherlands) Thiemo de Bakker	3–6, 6–3, 6–3
2013	(Kazakhstan) Andrey Golubev	(Argentina) Diego Schwartzman	6–1, 6–3
2012	(Czech Republic) Jan Hájek	(Austria) Andreas Haider-Maurer	6–2, 6–2
2011	(Germany) Björn Phau	(Czech Republic) Jan Hájek	6–4, 2–6, 6–3
2010	(Italy) Simone Vagnozzi	(Czech Republic) Ivo Minář	2–6, 6–3, 7–5

=== Doubles ===
Year	Champions	Runners-up	Score
2018	(Brazil) Fabrício Neis (Spain) David Vega Hernández	(Switzerland) Henri Laaksonen (Switzerland) Luca Margaroli	4–6, 6–4, [10–8]
2017	(Argentina) Máximo González (Brazil) Fabrício Neis	(Australia) Rameez Junaid (South Africa) Ruan Roelofse	6–3, 7–6^{(7–4)}
2016	(United States) James Cerretani (Austria) Philipp Oswald	(Mexico) Miguel Ángel Reyes-Varela (United States) Max Schnur	6–3, 6–2
2015	(Netherlands) Wesley Koolhof (Netherlands) Matwé Middelkoop	(Germany) Tobias Kamke (Germany) Simon Stadler	6–1, 7–5
2014	(Czech Republic) Jaroslav Pospíšil (Croatia) Franko Škugor	(Argentina) Diego Sebastián Schwartzman (Argentina) Horacio Zeballos	6–4, 6–4
2013	(Kazakhstan) Andrey Golubev (Kazakhstan) Evgeny Korolev	(Netherlands) Jesse Huta Galung (Australia) Jordan Kerr	6–3, 1–6, [10–6]
2012	(Poland) Mateusz Kowalczyk (Czech Republic) David Škoch	(Russia) Denis Matsukevich (Germany) Mischa Zverev	6–2, 6–1
2011	(Argentina) Federico del Bonis (Argentina) Horacio Zeballos	(Germany) Martin Emmrich (Germany) Björn Phau	7–6(3), 6–2
2010	(Germany) Matthias Bachinger (Germany) Denis Gremelmayr	(Spain) Guillermo Olaso (Slovenia) Grega Žemlja	6–4, 6–4
