= 2019 US Open – Men's singles qualifying =

Men's singles qualifying
- 2019 US Open

Events
Singles	men	women		boys	girls
Doubles	men	women	mixed	boys	girls
WC Singles	men	women	quad
WC Doubles	men	women	quad
Legends	men	women	mixed

Qualification
Singles	men	women
- US Open

The 2019 US Open – Men's Singles Qualifying is a series of tennis matches that takes place from 19 August 2019 to 23 August 2019 to determine the sixteen qualifiers into the main draw of the 2019 US Open – Men's singles, and, if necessary, the lucky losers.

== Seeds ==
1. (Italy) Stefano Travaglia (first round)
2. (Germany) Peter Gojowczyk (first round)
3. (South Korea) Kwon Soon-woo (qualified)
4. (Poland) Kamil Majchrzak (qualifying competition, lucky loser)
5. (Tunisia) Malek Jaziri (first round)
6. (Italy) Salvatore Caruso (second round)
7. (Argentina) Guido Andreozzi (first round)
8. (France) Grégoire Barrère (qualified)
9. (Sweden) Mikael Ymer (qualifying competition)
10. (United States) Tommy Paul (second round)
11. (Germany) Dominik Koepfer (qualified)
12. (Germany) Matthias Bachinger (first round)
13. (Slovakia) Norbert Gombos (second round)
14. (Japan) Taro Daniel (first round)
15. (Italy) Paolo Lorenzi (qualifying competition, lucky loser)
16. (Sweden) Elias Ymer (first round)
17. (Germany) Yannick Maden (first round)
18. (Latvia) Ernests Gulbis (first round)
19. (Russia) Evgeny Donskoy (qualified)
20. (Spain) Alejandro Davidovich Fokina (first round)
21. (Italy) Lorenzo Giustino (first round)
22. (Belarus) Egor Gerasimov (qualified)
23. (Chinese Taipei) Jason Jung (second round)
24. (Italy) Jannik Sinner (qualified)
25. (Australia) James Duckworth (first round)
26. (Japan) Tatsuma Ito (first round)
27. (Japan) Yūichi Sugita (second round)
28. (Australia) Alex Bolt (first round)
29. (South Korea) Chung Hyeon (qualified)
30. (Belarus) Ilya Ivashka (qualified)
31. (Belgium) Kimmer Coppejans (qualifying competition)
32. (Uzbekistan) Denis Istomin (first round)

== Qualifiers ==
1. (France) Elliot Benchetrit
2. (Colombia) Santiago Giraldo
3. (South Korea) Kwon Soon-woo
4. (Belarus) Ilya Ivashka
5. (Russia) Evgeny Donskoy
6. (Belarus) Egor Gerasimov
7. (Germany) Tobias Kamke
8. (France) Grégoire Barrère
9. (South Korea) Chung Hyeon
10. (United States) Jenson Brooksby
11. (Germany) Dominik Koepfer
12. (Spain) Guillermo García López
13. (India) Sumit Nagal
14. (Italy) Jannik Sinner
15. (Czech Republic) Jiří Veselý
16. (Argentina) Marco Trungelliti

== Lucky losers ==
1. (Italy) Paolo Lorenzi
2. (Poland) Kamil Majchrzak

== Qualifying draw ==
=== First qualifier ===
First round
1	(Italy) Stefano Travaglia	6	6^{3}	2
(France) Elliot Benchetrit	2	7^{7}	6
(Italy) Federico Gaio	6^{3}	3
(China) Zhang Ze	7^{7}	6
(Czech Republic) Zdeněk Kolář	2	6	7^{7}
(United States) Michael Mmoh	6	1	6^{1}
WC	(United States) Sebastian Korda	7	3	1
31	(Belgium) Kimmer Coppejans	5	6	6

Second round
(France) Elliot Benchetrit	6	6
(China) Zhang Ze	3	2
(Czech Republic) Zdeněk Kolář	5	3
31	(Belgium) Kimmer Coppejans	7	6

Qualifying competition
(France) Elliot Benchetrit	6	3	6
31	(Belgium) Kimmer Coppejans	3	6	3

=== Second qualifier ===
First round
2	(Germany) Peter Gojowczyk	4	6	3
(Bosnia and Herzegovina) Mirza Bašić	6	3	6
(Italy) Andrea Arnaboldi	4	4
(Ecuador) Emilio Gómez	6	6
(Italy) Roberto Marcora	4	3
(Colombia) Santiago Giraldo	6	6
(Germany) Mischa Zverev	7^{7}	7^{10}
32	(Uzbekistan) Denis Istomin	6^{4}	6^{8}

Second round
(Bosnia and Herzegovina) Mirza Bašić	7^{9}	6
(Ecuador) Emilio Gómez	6^{7}	2
(Colombia) Santiago Giraldo	7	6
(Germany) Mischa Zverev	5	3

Qualifying competition
(Bosnia and Herzegovina) Mirza Bašić	6^{5}	4
(Colombia) Santiago Giraldo	7^{7}	6

=== Third qualifier ===
First round
3	(South Korea) Kwon Soon-woo	6	1	6
WC	(United States) JC Aragone	4	6	4
WC	(United States) Govind Nanda	6^{4}	1
(Germany) Oscar Otte	7^{7}	6
(Israel) Dudi Sela	6	4	2
(Canada) Steven Diez	4	6	6
(Japan) Yosuke Watanuki	6	6
18	(Latvia) Ernests Gulbis	2	1

Second round
3	(South Korea) Kwon Soon-woo	6	6
(Germany) Oscar Otte	2	4
(Canada) Steven Diez	6	5	6
(Japan) Yosuke Watanuki	2	7	0

Qualifying competition
3	(South Korea) Kwon Soon-woo	4	6	6
(Canada) Steven Diez	6	3	3

=== Fourth qualifier ===
First round
4	(Poland) Kamil Majchrzak	6	3	6
(Argentina) Carlos Berlocq	3	6	3
(Japan) Go Soeda	4	4
(Spain) Tommy Robredo	6	6
(Belgium) Ruben Bemelmans	6	7^{7}
(Japan) Hiroki Moriya	1	6^{5}
(Germany) Mats Moraing	3	0
30	(Belarus) Ilya Ivashka	6	6

Second round
4	(Poland) Kamil Majchrzak	6	6
(Spain) Tommy Robredo	3	4
(Belgium) Ruben Bemelmans	4	3
30	(Belarus) Ilya Ivashka	6	6

Qualifying competition
4	(Poland) Kamil Majchrzak	1	5
30	(Belarus) Ilya Ivashka	6	7

=== Fifth qualifier ===
First round
5	(Tunisia) Malek Jaziri	2	4
(Barbados) Darian King	6	6
(Spain) Adrián Menéndez Maceiras	6	6
(France) Quentin Halys	2	2
(Kazakhstan) Aleksandr Nedovyesov	2	2
(Portugal) João Domingues	6	6
(Spain) Bernabé Zapata Miralles	2	3
19	(Russia) Evgeny Donskoy	6	6

Second round
(Barbados) Darian King	6	6
(Spain) Adrián Menéndez Maceiras	1	4
(Portugal) João Domingues	6^{8}	5
19	(Russia) Evgeny Donskoy	7^{10}	7

Qualifying competition
(Barbados) Darian King	4	3
19	(Russia) Evgeny Donskoy	6	6

=== Sixth qualifier ===
First round
6	(Italy) Salvatore Caruso	6	6
(South Korea) Chung Yun-seong	0	2
(Slovenia) Blaž Rola	5	6	1
(Czech Republic) Lukáš Rosol	7	3	6
(United Kingdom) Jay Clarke	7^{7}	4	4
(United States) Mitchell Krueger	6^{2}	6	6
WC	(United States) Stefan Kozlov	4	4
22	(Belarus) Egor Gerasimov	6	6

Second round
6	(Italy) Salvatore Caruso	1	5
(Czech Republic) Lukáš Rosol	6	7
(United States) Mitchell Krueger	3	7	4
22	(Belarus) Egor Gerasimov	6	5	6

Qualifying competition
(Czech Republic) Lukáš Rosol	2	7^{7}	6^{5}
22	(Belarus) Egor Gerasimov	6	6^{3}	7^{7}

=== Seventh qualifier ===
First round
7	(Argentina) Guido Andreozzi	6	6^{5}	3
(Germany) Tobias Kamke	4	7^{7}	6
(India) Ramkumar Ramanathan	5	6^{9}
(Italy) Filippo Baldi	7	7^{11}
(Spain) Nicola Kuhn	6	6
(Ukraine) Sergiy Stakhovsky	4	4
(Slovakia) Lukáš Lacko	6	6
17	(Germany) Yannick Maden	4	3

Second round
(Germany) Tobias Kamke	6	7^{7}
(Italy) Filippo Baldi	4	6^{5}
(Spain) Nicola Kuhn	4	6^{0}
(Slovakia) Lukáš Lacko	6	7^{7}

Qualifying competition
(Germany) Tobias Kamke	7	6
(Slovakia) Lukáš Lacko	5	3

=== Eighth qualifier ===
First round
8	(France) Grégoire Barrère	6^{5}	7^{7}	7^{7}
(Australia) Andrew Harris	7^{7}	6^{2}	6^{3}
(Australia) Max Purcell	3	7^{7}	3
(Serbia) Nikola Milojević	6	6^{3}	6
(Germany) Rudolf Molleker	2	5
(Denmark) Mikael Torpegaard	6	7
(Colombia) Daniel Elahi Galán	6	6
28	(Australia) Alex Bolt	3	3

Second round
8	(France) Grégoire Barrère	4	6	6
(Serbia) Nikola Milojević	6	3	4
(Denmark) Mikael Torpegaard	7^{7}	3	1
(Colombia) Daniel Elahi Galán	6^{3}	6	6

Qualifying competition
8	(France) Grégoire Barrère	6	6
(Colombia) Daniel Elahi Galán	4	3

=== Ninth qualifier ===
First round
9	(Sweden) Mikael Ymer	5	6	7^{7}
(United States) Thai-Son Kwiatkowski	7	3	6^{2}
WC	(United States) Alex Rybakov	6	1	2
(Argentina) Facundo Bagnis	4	6	6
(Italy) Stefano Napolitano	6	6
WC	(United States) Sam Riffice	2	4
(Austria) Sebastian Ofner	3	3
29	(South Korea) Chung Hyeon	6	6

Second round
9	(Sweden) Mikael Ymer	7	6
(Argentina) Facundo Bagnis	5	4
(Italy) Stefano Napolitano	2	3
29	(South Korea) Chung Hyeon	6	6

Qualifying competition
9	(Sweden) Mikael Ymer	1	3
29	(South Korea) Chung Hyeon	6	6

=== Tenth qualifier ===
First round
10	(United States) Tommy Paul	4	6	7^{7}
PR	(Germany) Yannick Hanfmann	6	4	6^{3}
(Spain) Pedro Martínez	4	6	6
(Argentina) Federico Coria	6	3	2
WC	(United States) Jenson Brooksby	6	6
(Japan) Kaichi Uchida	3	2
(Australia) Marc Polmans	3	4
27	(Japan) Yūichi Sugita	6	6

Second round
10	(United States) Tommy Paul	4	4
(Spain) Pedro Martínez	6	6
WC	(United States) Jenson Brooksby	7^{7}	7^{7}
27	(Japan) Yūichi Sugita	6^{4}	6^{3}

Qualifying competition
(Spain) Pedro Martínez	3	7^{7}	3
WC	(United States) Jenson Brooksby	6	6^{4}	6

=== Eleventh qualifier ===
First round
11	(Germany) Dominik Koepfer	6	6
(United States) Ryan Harrison	1	1
(France) Nicolas Mahut	3	7	6
WC	(United States) Maxime Cressy	6	5	1
(Argentina) Pedro Cachin	1	6	1
PR	(Slovenia) Blaž Kavčič	6	4	6
(Japan) Yasutaka Uchiyama	7^{7}	6
20	(Spain) Alejandro Davidovich Fokina	6^{5}	3

Second round
11	(Germany) Dominik Koepfer	7^{7}	4	6
(France) Nicolas Mahut	6^{3}	6	3
PR	(Slovenia) Blaž Kavčič	1	4
(Japan) Yasutaka Uchiyama	6	6

Qualifying competition
11	(Germany) Dominik Koepfer	6	6
(Japan) Yasutaka Uchiyama	3	4

=== Twelfth qualifier ===
First round
12	(Germany) Matthias Bachinger	6^{2}	6	5
(France) Constant Lestienne	7^{7}	3	7
WC	(United States) J. J. Wolf	6	5	2
(Italy) Alessandro Giannessi	2	7	6
(Italy) Gianluca Mager	2	3
(United States) Noah Rubin	6	6
(Spain) Guillermo García López	3	7	6
21	(Italy) Lorenzo Giustino	6	5	2

Second round
(France) Constant Lestienne	6	6
(Italy) Alessandro Giannessi	3	0
(United States) Noah Rubin	1	6^{3}
(Spain) Guillermo García López	6	7^{7}

Qualifying competition
(France) Constant Lestienne	4	4
(Spain) Guillermo García López	6	6

=== Thirteenth qualifier ===
First round
13	(Slovakia) Norbert Gombos	6	6
(France) Maxime Janvier	3	2
(Brazil) João Menezes	4	6	6
(Slovakia) Filip Horanský	6	1	2
(Canada) Peter Polansky	6	3	6
(Brazil) Rogério Dutra Silva	3	6	4
(India) Sumit Nagal	7^{8}	6
26	(Japan) Tatsuma Ito	6^{6}	2

Second round
13	(Slovakia) Norbert Gombos	6	2	6^{1}
(Brazil) João Menezes	1	6	7^{7}
(Canada) Peter Polansky	5	6^{0}
(India) Sumit Nagal	7	7^{7}

Qualifying competition
(Brazil) João Menezes	7	4	3
(India) Sumit Nagal	5	6	6

=== Fourteenth qualifier ===
First round
14	(Japan) Taro Daniel	6^{5}	7^{8}	4
(Spain) Mario Vilella Martínez	7^{7}	6^{6}	6
(Serbia) Peđa Krstin	1	4
(Australia) Akira Santillan	6	6
(Australia) John-Patrick Smith	6^{5}	4
(Croatia) Viktor Galović	7^{7}	6
(Italy) Matteo Viola	1	0
24	(Italy) Jannik Sinner	6	6

Second round
(Spain) Mario Vilella Martínez	6^{6}	6	6
(Australia) Akira Santillan	7^{8}	4	2
(Croatia) Viktor Galović	6	6^{2}	5
24	(Italy) Jannik Sinner	4	7^{7}	7

Qualifying competition
(Spain) Mario Vilella Martínez	6^{1}	0
24	(Italy) Jannik Sinner	7^{7}	6

=== Fifteenth qualifier ===
First round
15	(Italy) Paolo Lorenzi	7	6
(Spain) Enrique López Pérez	5	2
(Russia) Alexey Vatutin	6^{2}	3
(France) Enzo Couacaud	7^{7}	6
(Czech Republic) Jiří Veselý	6	7
(Portugal) Pedro Sousa	4	5
(United States) Donald Young	3	7^{7}	5
23	(Chinese Taipei) Jason Jung	6	6^{4}	7

Second round
15	(Italy) Paolo Lorenzi	7^{7}	6
(France) Enzo Couacaud	6^{3}	3
(Czech Republic) Jiří Veselý	6	5	7
23	(Chinese Taipei) Jason Jung	4	7	5

Qualifying competition
15	(Italy) Paolo Lorenzi	4	7	6^{2}
(Czech Republic) Jiří Veselý	6	5	7^{7}

=== Sixteenth qualifier ===
First round
16	(Sweden) Elias Ymer	5	2
(Netherlands) Tallon Griekspoor	7	6
(Turkey) Cem İlkel	6	6
(Ecuador) Roberto Quiroz	1	4
(United Kingdom) James Ward	7^{7}	6
(China) Li Zhe	6^{5}	3
(Argentina) Marco Trungelliti	6	5	6
25	(Australia) James Duckworth	3	7	3

Second round
(Netherlands) Tallon Griekspoor	7	6
(Turkey) Cem İlkel	5	3
(United Kingdom) James Ward	4	3
(Argentina) Marco Trungelliti	6	6

Qualifying competition
(Netherlands) Tallon Griekspoor	6	3	2
(Argentina) Marco Trungelliti	4	6	6
