= 2019 US Open – Women's singles qualifying =

Women's singles qualifying
- 2019 US Open

Events
Singles	men	women		boys	girls
Doubles	men	women	mixed	boys	girls
WC Singles	men	women	quad
WC Doubles	men	women	quad
Legends	men	women	mixed

Qualification
Singles	men	women
- US Open

The 2019 US Open – Women's Singles Qualifying is a series of tennis matches that takes place from 19 August 2019 to 23 August 2019 to determine the sixteen qualifiers into the main draw of the 2019 US Open – Women's singles, and, if necessary, the lucky losers.

== Seeds ==
1. (Kazakhstan) Elena Rybakina (qualified)
2. (Spain) Paula Badosa (qualifying competition, lucky loser)
3. (Romania) Irina-Camelia Begu (second round)
4. (United States) Christina McHale (second round)
5. (Belgium) Kirsten Flipkens (qualifying competition, lucky loser)
6. (Switzerland) Stefanie Vögele (first round)
7. (Netherlands) Arantxa Rus (first round)
8. (United Kingdom) Heather Watson (first round)
9. (Belgium) Ysaline Bonaventure (first round)
10. (China) Wang Xiyu (qualifying competition, lucky loser)
11. (United States) Varvara Lepchenko (qualifying competition, lucky loser)
12. (Montenegro) Danka Kovinić (second round)
13. (United States) Taylor Townsend (qualified)
14. (Italy) Jasmine Paolini (second round)
15. (Belgium) Greet Minnen (first round)
16. (Czech Republic) Barbora Krejčíková (second round, retired)
17. (Russia) Anna Kalinskaya (qualified)
18. (Poland) Katarzyna Kawa (first round)
19. (Hungary) Tímea Babos (qualified)
20. (Ukraine) Katarina Zavatska (second round)
21. (Russia) Liudmila Samsonova (second round)
22. (Ukraine) Anhelina Kalinina (first round)
23. (Japan) Nao Hibino (second round)
24. (United States) Nicole Gibbs (qualifying competition, lucky loser)
25. (Australia) Priscilla Hon (qualifying competition, lucky loser)
26. (Romania) Patricia Maria Țig (first round)
27. (Czech Republic) Tereza Martincová (qualified)
28. (Romania) Ana Bogdan (qualified)
29. (United Kingdom) Harriet Dart (qualified)
30. (France) Chloé Paquet (first round)
31. (Austria) Barbara Haas (first round)
32. (Russia) Varvara Flink (second round)

== Qualifiers ==
1. (Kazakhstan) Elena Rybakina
2. (Poland) Magdalena Fręch
3. (Slovakia) Jana Čepelová
4. (China) Peng Shuai
5. (Sweden) Johanna Larsson
6. (United States) Caroline Dolehide
7. (Romania) Ana Bogdan
8. (Georgia (country)) Mariam Bolkvadze
9. (Czech Republic) Denisa Allertová
10. (United Kingdom) Harriet Dart
11. (Hungary) Tímea Babos
12. (Netherlands) Richèl Hogenkamp
13. (United States) Taylor Townsend
14. (China) Wang Xinyu
15. (Czech Republic) Tereza Martincová
16. (Russia) Anna Kalinskaya

== Lucky losers ==
1. (Spain) Paula Badosa
2. (United States) Varvara Lepchenko
3. (United States) Nicole Gibbs
4. (Australia) Priscilla Hon
5. (Belgium) Kirsten Flipkens
6. (China) Wang Xiyu

== Draw ==
=== First qualifier ===
First round
1	(Kazakhstan) Elena Rybakina	6	6
WC	(United States) Emma Navarro	1	1
(Australia) Arina Rodionova	6	6
(Hungary) Fanny Stollár	4	2
(Australia) Maddison Inglis	6	6
(Greece) Valentini Grammatikopoulou	3	4
(Australia) Lizette Cabrera	6	6^{6}	6
18	(Poland) Katarzyna Kawa	1	7^{8}	3

Second round
1	(Kazakhstan) Elena Rybakina	6	6
(Australia) Arina Rodionova	2	1
(Australia) Maddison Inglis	3	0
(Australia) Lizette Cabrera	6	6

Qualifying competition
1	(Kazakhstan) Elena Rybakina	7^{7}	6
(Australia) Lizette Cabrera	6^{5}	3

=== Second qualifier ===
First round
2	(Spain) Paula Badosa	6	6
(Chinese Taipei) Liang En-shuo	1	3
(Netherlands) Quirine Lemoine	1	7	7^{7}
(Croatia) Tereza Mrdeža	6	5	6^{5}
(Poland) Magdalena Fręch	6	6
(China) Lu Jiajing	3	4
(Slovakia) Rebecca Šramková	6^{4}	6	6
30	(France) Chloé Paquet	7^{7}	3	4

Second round
2	(Spain) Paula Badosa	6^{6}	6	6
(Netherlands) Quirine Lemoine	7^{8}	4	2
(Poland) Magdalena Fręch	6	5	6
(Slovakia) Rebecca Šramková	2	7	4

Qualifying competition
2	(Spain) Paula Badosa	4	6	3
(Poland) Magdalena Fręch	6	3	6

=== Third qualifier ===
First round
3	(Romania) Irina-Camelia Begu	6	6
(Turkey) Pemra Özgen	3	2
(Slovakia) Jana Čepelová	6	6
(United Kingdom) Naiktha Bains	3	1
(Australia) Jaimee Fourlis	5	6	6
(Germany) Antonia Lottner	7	4	4
(Latvia) Diāna Marcinkēviča	1	4
21	(Russia) Liudmila Samsonova	6	6

Second round
3	(Romania) Irina-Camelia Begu	3	2
(Slovakia) Jana Čepelová	6	6
(Australia) Jaimee Fourlis	7^{7}	7^{7}
21	(Russia) Liudmila Samsonova	6^{3}	6^{1}

Qualifying competition
(Slovakia) Jana Čepelová	6	6
(Australia) Jaimee Fourlis	4	2

=== Fourth qualifier ===
First round
4	(United States) Christina McHale	6	6
(Italy) Martina Di Giuseppe	3	2
(Italy) Giulia Gatto-Monticone	6	4	0
(China) Peng Shuai	4	6	6
(United States) Robin Anderson	6	3	6
(China) Han Xinyun	4	6	4
(Australia) Kaylah McPhee	2	6	1
24	(United States) Nicole Gibbs	6	3	6

Second round
4	(United States) Christina McHale	4	4
(China) Peng Shuai	6	6
(United States) Robin Anderson
24	(United States) Nicole Gibbs	w/o

Qualifying competition
(China) Peng Shuai	6	4	6
24	(United States) Nicole Gibbs	3	6	3

=== Fifth qualifier ===
First round
5	(Belgium) Kirsten Flipkens	6	6
(Romania) Irina Bara	3	4
(Serbia) Jovana Jakšić	6	6
(Austria) Julia Grabher	2	4
(Sweden) Johanna Larsson	3	7^{7}	7^{7}
(Netherlands) Lesley Pattinama Kerkhove	6	6^{2}	6^{3}
(United States) Danielle Lao	6	4	0
23	(Japan) Nao Hibino	3	6	6

Second round
5	(Belgium) Kirsten Flipkens	6	6
(Serbia) Jovana Jakšić	2	0
(Sweden) Johanna Larsson	7	7^{7}
23	(Japan) Nao Hibino	5	6^{5}

Qualifying competition
5	(Belgium) Kirsten Flipkens	5	4
(Sweden) Johanna Larsson	7	6

=== Sixth qualifier ===
First round
6	(Switzerland) Stefanie Vögele	4	6	2
(Australia) Zoe Hives	6	4	6
WC	(United States) Shelby Rogers	6^{3}	0^{r}
WC	(United States) Caroline Dolehide	7^{7}	1
(Czech Republic) Anastasia Zarycká	5	0
(Germany) Anna-Lena Friedsam	7	6
(Israel) Julia Glushko	7	3	2
20	(Ukraine) Katarina Zavatska	5	6	6

Second round
(Australia) Zoe Hives	1	6^{2}
WC	(United States) Caroline Dolehide	6	7^{7}
(Germany) Anna-Lena Friedsam	6	4	6
20	(Ukraine) Katarina Zavatska	2	6	3

Qualifying competition
WC	(United States) Caroline Dolehide	6	6
(Germany) Anna-Lena Friedsam	4	3

=== Seventh qualifier ===
First round
7	(Netherlands) Arantxa Rus	6	4	1
(Bulgaria) Isabella Shinikova	1	6	6
(Canada) Françoise Abanda	4	2
(United States) Sachia Vickery	6	6
(Switzerland) Conny Perrin	3	3
(Australia) Ellen Perez	6	6
WC	(United States) Bethanie Mattek-Sands	5	5
28	(Romania) Ana Bogdan	7	7

Second round
(Bulgaria) Isabella Shinikova	6	4	7^{8}
(United States) Sachia Vickery	1	6	6^{6}
(Australia) Ellen Perez	4	6^{6}
28	(Romania) Ana Bogdan	6	7^{8}

Qualifying competition
(Bulgaria) Isabella Shinikova	1	3
28	(Romania) Ana Bogdan	6	6

=== Eighth qualifier ===
First round
8	(United Kingdom) Heather Watson	4	2
(Georgia (country)) Mariam Bolkvadze	6	6
(South Korea) Han Na-lae	4	6	6
(Slovakia) Magdaléna Rybáriková	6	3	3
WC	(United States) Victoria Duval	3	2
(China) Xu Shilin	6	6
(Argentina) Paula Ormaechea	6	4	4
32	(Russia) Varvara Flink	3	6	6

Second round
(Georgia (country)) Mariam Bolkvadze	2	6	7
(South Korea) Han Na-lae	6	2	5
(China) Xu Shilin	6	6
32	(Russia) Varvara Flink	3	2

Qualifying competition
(Georgia (country)) Mariam Bolkvadze	6	2	6
(China) Xu Shilin	4	6	4

=== Ninth qualifier ===
First round
9	(Belgium) Ysaline Bonaventure	1	6	2
(India) Ankita Raina	6	1	6
WC	(United States) Reese Brantmeier	6	4	1
PR	(Czech Republic) Denisa Allertová	3	6	6
(Germany) Katharina Hobgarski	6	6
(Spain) Cristina Bucșa	4	3
(France) Harmony Tan	4	5
25	(Australia) Priscilla Hon	6	7

Second round
(India) Ankita Raina	7^{7}	4	2
PR	(Czech Republic) Denisa Allertová	6^{5}	6	6
(Germany) Katharina Hobgarski	7	4	2
25	(Australia) Priscilla Hon	5	6	6

Qualifying competition
PR	(Czech Republic) Denisa Allertová	6	7
25	(Australia) Priscilla Hon	3	5

=== Tenth qualifier ===
First round
10	(China) Wang Xiyu	6	6
(Georgia (country)) Ekaterine Gorgodze	1	3
(Bulgaria) Elitsa Kostova	5	4
(Belgium) Yanina Wickmayer	7	6
(Hungary) Anna Bondár	3	1
WC	(United States) Hailey Baptiste	6	6
WC	(United States) Jamie Loeb	2	6^{3}
29	(United Kingdom) Harriet Dart	6	7^{7}

Second round
10	(China) Wang Xiyu	6	7
(Belgium) Yanina Wickmayer	4	5
WC	(United States) Hailey Baptiste	5	4
29	(United Kingdom) Harriet Dart	7	6

Qualifying competition
10	(China) Wang Xiyu	2	7	3
29	(United Kingdom) Harriet Dart	6	5	6

=== Eleventh qualifier ===
First round
11	(United States) Varvara Lepchenko	4	6	6
(China) Zhang Kailin	6	1	4
(Spain) Georgina García Pérez	3	7^{7}	6
(Romania) Jaqueline Cristian	6	6^{3}	4
(Spain) Lara Arruabarrena	6	6
(Canada) Katherine Sebov	1	2
(Japan) Kurumi Nara	1	6	3
19	(Hungary) Tímea Babos	6	4	6

Second round
11	(United States) Varvara Lepchenko	6	7^{7}
(Spain) Georgina García Pérez	4	6^{1}
(Spain) Lara Arruabarrena	4	1
19	(Hungary) Tímea Babos	6	6

Qualifying competition
11	(United States) Varvara Lepchenko	6^{5}	4
19	(Hungary) Tímea Babos	7^{7}	6

=== Twelfth qualifier ===
First round
12	(Montenegro) Danka Kovinić	3	6	6
(United States) Allie Kiick	6	3	0
(Russia) Varvara Gracheva	6	6
(Italy) Martina Trevisan	0	1
(Switzerland) Ylena In-Albon	4	6^{5}
(Netherlands) Richèl Hogenkamp	6	7^{7}
(Russia) Valeria Savinykh	4	7^{7}	6
26	(Romania) Patricia Maria Țig	6	6^{4}	3

Second round
12	(Montenegro) Danka Kovinić	6^{3}	1
(Russia) Varvara Gracheva	7^{7}	6
(Netherlands) Richèl Hogenkamp	6	6
(Russia) Valeria Savinykh	4	3

Qualifying competition
(Russia) Varvara Gracheva	4	6^{6}
(Netherlands) Richèl Hogenkamp	6	7^{8}

=== Thirteenth qualifier ===
First round
13	(United States) Taylor Townsend	6	6
(Serbia) Natalija Kostić	3	1
(Paraguay) Verónica Cepede Royg	6	7^{7}
PR	(Sweden) Susanne Celik	3	6^{2}
(Cyprus) Raluka Șerban	6^{5}	2
(Serbia) Nina Stojanović	7^{7}	6
(United States) Ann Li	6	6
22	(Ukraine) Anhelina Kalinina	0	3

Second round
13	(United States) Taylor Townsend	3	6	6
(Paraguay) Verónica Cepede Royg	6	3	3
(Serbia) Nina Stojanović	6	7^{7}
(United States) Ann Li	4	6^{5}

Qualifying competition
13	(United States) Taylor Townsend	3	7^{7}	6
(Serbia) Nina Stojanović	6	6^{5}	1

=== Fourteenth qualifier ===
First round
14	(Italy) Jasmine Paolini	6	3	6
(United States) Usue Maitane Arconada	1	6	1
(Romania) Elena-Gabriela Ruse	6	6
(Romania) Alexandra Cadanțu	0	4
(France) Jessika Ponchet	2	6	2
(Belarus) Olga Govortsova	6	2	6
(China) Wang Xinyu	6	5	6
31	(Austria) Barbara Haas	1	7	2

Second round
14	(Italy) Jasmine Paolini	3	1
(Romania) Elena-Gabriela Ruse	6	6
(Belarus) Olga Govortsova	2	2
(China) Wang Xinyu	6	6

Qualifying competition
(Romania) Elena-Gabriela Ruse	1	1
(China) Wang Xinyu	6	6

=== Fifteenth qualifier ===
First round
15	(Belgium) Greet Minnen	3	4
(Slovakia) Kristína Kučová	6	6
(Norway) Ulrikke Eikeri	4	3
(Netherlands) Bibiane Schoofs	6	6
(Australia) Destanee Aiava	6	5	6^{5}
(Japan) Ayano Shimizu	2	7	7^{7}
(Slovenia) Dalila Jakupović	4	6	2
27	(Czech Republic) Tereza Martincová	6	3	6

Second round
(Slovakia) Kristína Kučová	6^{1}	6	6
(Netherlands) Bibiane Schoofs	7^{7}	2	3
(Japan) Ayano Shimizu	1	4
27	(Czech Republic) Tereza Martincová	6	6

Qualifying competition
(Slovakia) Kristína Kučová	6	2	2
27	(Czech Republic) Tereza Martincová	4	6	6

=== Sixteenth qualifier ===
First round
16	(Czech Republic) Barbora Krejčíková	6	7^{7}
(Czech Republic) Tereza Smitková	1	6^{5}
(Turkey) Başak Eraydın	5	1
(United States) Asia Muhammad	7	6
WC	(United States) Katrina Scott	6	6
(United Kingdom) Katie Swan	3	3
(Bulgaria) Viktoriya Tomova	2	4
17	(Russia) Anna Kalinskaya	6	6

Second round
16	(Czech Republic) Barbora Krejčíková	0^{r}
(United States) Asia Muhammad	1
WC	(United States) Katrina Scott	3	3
17	(Russia) Anna Kalinskaya	6	6

Qualifying competition
(United States) Asia Muhammad	6	4	6^{2}
17	(Russia) Anna Kalinskaya	3	6	7^{7}
