= Aubane Droguet =

French tennis player

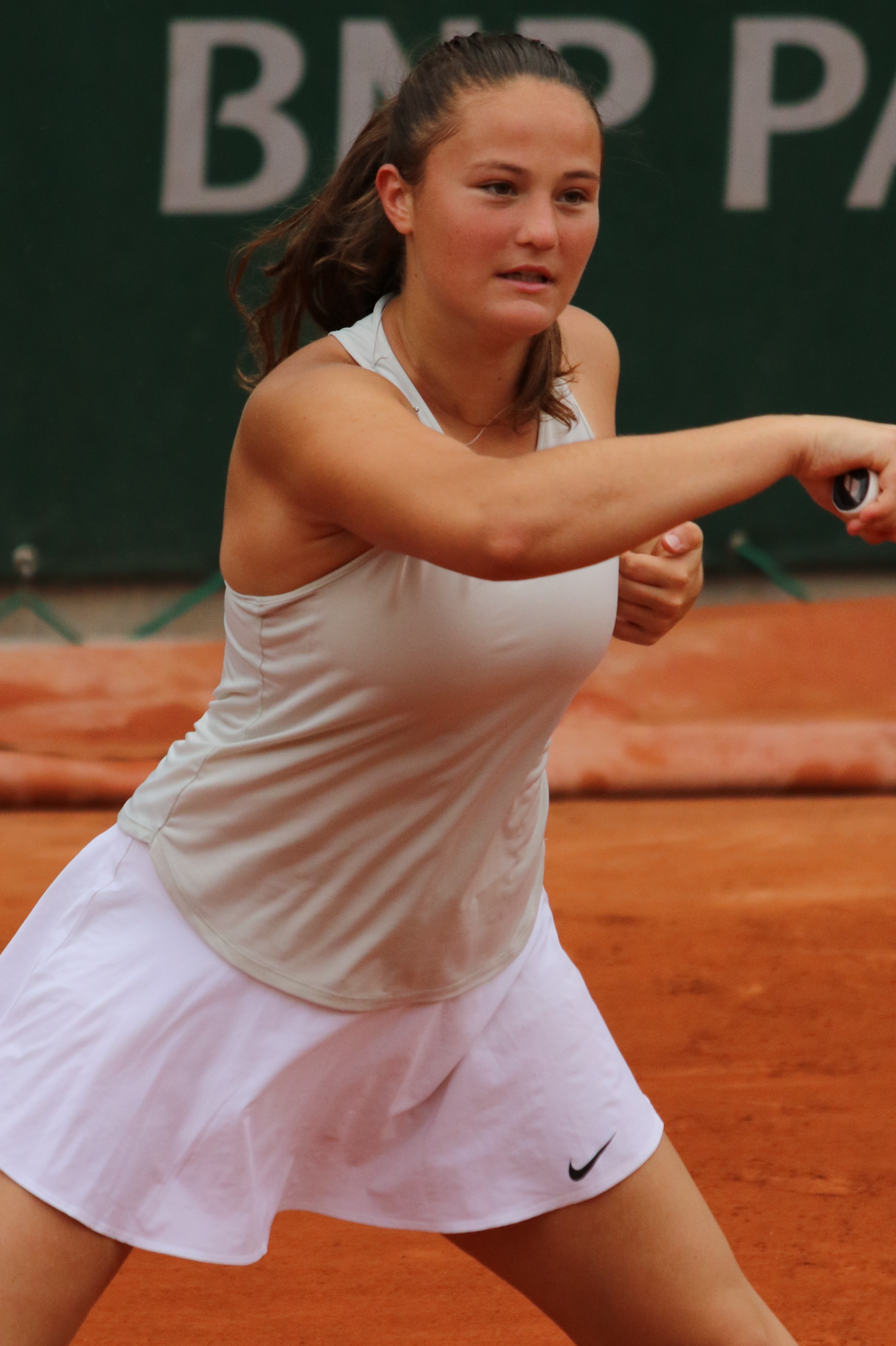
- Droguet at the 2019 French Open
- Country (sports): France
- Born: 27 December 2002 (age 22)
- Plays: Right (two-handed backhand)
- Prize money: US$ 64,766

Singles
- Career record: 57–58
- Highest ranking: No. 711 (23 August 2021)

Grand Slam singles results
- French Open: Q1 (2020, 2021)
- US Open: 2R (2019)

Doubles
- Career record: 21–26
- Career titles: 2 ITF
- Highest ranking: No. 454 (18 April 2022)

Grand Slam doubles results
- French Open: 1R (2019, 2020, 2021)
- Last updated on: 12 August 2024.

Aubane Droguet (born 27 December 2002) is an inactive French tennis player.

She has career-high WTA rankings of 711 in singles, achieved on 23 August 2021, and 454 in doubles, reached on 18 April 2022.

Droguet made her Grand Slam main-draw debut at the 2019 French Open, after receiving a wildcard for the doubles tournament, partnering Séléna Janicijevic.

In July 2019, she won her first title on the professional circuit, in the doubles event at Les Contamines-Montjoie, France, partnering Margaux Rouvroy.

== ITF Circuit finals ==
=== Singles: 3 (3 runner–ups) ===
Legend $60,000 tournaments $25,000 tournaments $15,000 tournaments	Finals by surface Hard (0–3) Clay (0–0) Carpet (0–0)

Result	W–L	Date	Tournament	Tier	Surface	Opponent	Score
Loss	0–1	Oct 2018	ITF Lousada, Portugal	15,000	Hard (i)	(Portugal) Francisca Jorge	3–6, 6–3, 6–7^{(4–7)}
Loss	0–2	Dec 2019	ITF Cancún, Mexico	15,000	Hard	(Mexico) Marcela Zacarías	2–6, 3–6
Loss	0–3	Dec 2020	ITF Monastir, Tunisia	15,000	Hard	(Spain) Nuria Párrizas Díaz	3–6, 0–6

=== Doubles: 3 (2 titles, 1 runner–up) ===
Legend $25,000 tournaments $15,000 tournaments	Finals by surface Hard (2–1) Clay (0–0)

Result	W–L	Date	Tournament	Tier	Surface	Partnering	Opponents	Score
Win	1–0	Jul 2019	ITF Les Contamines, France	15,000	Hard	(France) Margaux Rouvroy	(France) Rania Azziz (France) Mathilde Dury	7–5, 6–3
Win	2–0	Nov 2020	ITF Monastir, Tunisia	15,000	Hard	(Belarus) Shalimar Talbi	(Italy) Chiara Catini (France) Astrid Cirotte	7–5, 6–1
Loss	2–1	Dec 2020	ITF Monastir, Tunisia	15,000	Hard	(France) Helena Stevic	(Poland) Weronika Falkowska (Czech Republic) Anna Sisková	2–6, 2–6

== Junior Grand Slam tournament finals ==
=== Doubles: 1 (1 runner-up) ===
Result	Year	Tournament	Surface	Partner	Opponents	Score
Loss	2019	US Open	Hard	(France) Séléna Janicijevic	(Russia) Oksana Selekhmeteva (Latvia) Kamilla Bartone	5–7, 6–7^{(6–8)}
