= 2019 US Open – Girls' singles =

Girls' singles
- 2019 US Open

Final
- Champion: (Colombia) Camila Osorio
- Runner-up: (United States) Alexandra Yepifanova
- Score: 6–1, 6–0

Events
Singles	men	women		boys	girls
Doubles	men	women	mixed	boys	girls
WC Singles	men	women	quad
WC Doubles	men	women	quad
Legends	men	women	mixed
- US Open

Camila Osorio won the girls' singles tennis title at the 2019 US Open, defeating Alexandra Yepifanova 6−1, 6−0 in the final.

Wang Xiyu was the defending champion, but she competed in the women's singles as a lucky loser losing to Kirsten Flipkens in the first round.

== Seeds ==
1. (United States) Emma Navarro (second round)
2. (France) Diane Parry (first round)
3. (United States) Alexa Noel (third round)
4. (Colombia) Camila Osorio (champion)
5. (China) Zheng Qinwen (semifinals)
6. (Japan) Natsumi Kawaguchi (first round)
7. (Latvia) Kamilla Bartone (quarterfinals)
8. (United States) Hurricane Tyra Black (first round, retired)

9. (Burundi) Sada Nahimana (first round)
10. (Russia) Alina Charaeva (first round)
11. (Thailand) Mananchaya Sawangkaew (first round)
12. (South Korea) Park So-hyun (third round)
13. (United States) Abigail Forbes (third round)
14. (Russia) Anastasia Tikhonova (first round)
15. (Russia) Polina Kudermetova (third round)
16. (France) Elsa Jacquemot (third round)

== Main draw ==
Key

- Q = Qualifier
- WC = Wild card
- LL = Lucky loser
- Alt = Alternate
- ITF = ITF entry
- PR = Protected ranking
- SR = Special ranking
- SE = Special exempt
- JE = Junior exempt
- JR = Junior Accelerator Programme entrant
- CO = College Accelerator Programme entrant
- NG = Next Gen Accelerator Program entrant
- w/o = Walkover
- r = Retired
- d = Defaulted

=== Finals ===
Quarterfinals
(Russia) Oksana Selekhmeteva	1	6	6
WC	(United States) Katrina Scott	6	3	3
4	(Colombia) Camila Osorio	6	6
7	(Latvia) Kamilla Bartone	3	4
5	(China) Zheng Qinwen	6	6
(Indonesia) Priska Madelyn Nugroho	3	3
Q	(United States) Alexandra Yepifanova	4	6	6
WC	(United States) Reese Brantmeier	6	3	1

Semifinals
(Russia) Oksana Selekhmeteva	3	7^{7}	4
4	(Colombia) Camila Osorio	6	6^{3}	6
5	(China) Zheng Qinwen	6	4	5
Q	(United States) Alexandra Yepifanova	3	6	7

Final
4	(Colombia) Camila Osorio	6	6
Q	(United States) Alexandra Yepifanova	1	0

=== Top half ===
==== Section 1 ====
First round
1	(United States) Emma Navarro	6	6
(Hong Kong) Cody Wong Hong-yi	0	3
(Russia) Oksana Selekhmeteva	6	3	6
(Sweden) Caijsa Hennemann	1	6	3
WC	(United States) Gabriella Price	7	4	6
(Malta) Helene Pellicano	5	6	2
(Thailand) Thasaporn Naklo	1	3
16	(France) Elsa Jacquemot	6	6
10	(Russia) Alina Charaeva	5	3
WC	(United States) Katrina Scott	7	6
WC	(United States) Natasha Subhash	3	2
(Spain) Jéssica Bouzas Maneiro	6	6
(United States) Robin Montgomery	6	7
Q	(Northern Mariana Islands) Carol Young Suh Lee	2	5
(Chinese Taipei) Joanna Garland	6	1	6
6	(Japan) Natsumi Kawaguchi	4	6	3

Second round
1	(United States) E Navarro	4	6	4
(Russia) O Selekhmeteva	6	4	6
WC	(United States) G Price	6^{0}	1
16	(France) E Jacquemot	7^{7}	6
WC	(United States) K Scott	6	1	6
(Spain) J Bouzas Maneiro	4	6	3
(United States) R Montgomery	1	6	6
(Chinese Taipei) J Garland	6	2	4

Third round
(Russia) O Selekhmeteva	6	6
16	(France) E Jacquemot	4	4
WC	(United States) K Scott	7	6
(United States) R Montgomery	5	3

Quarterfinals
(Russia) O Selekhmeteva	1	6	6
WC	(United States) K Scott	6	3	3

==== Section 2 ====
First round
4	(Colombia) Camila Osorio	6	6
(Russia) Diana Shnaider	4	2
(United States) Katie Volynets	6	6
(France) Carole Monnet	1	3
Q	(Puerto Rico) Lauren Anzalotta Kynoch	4	3
(China) Bai Zhuoxuan	6	6
(Spain) Ane Mintegi del Olmo	2	3
13	(United States) Abigail Forbes	6	6
12	(South Korea) Park So-hyun	6	3	6
WC	(United States) Elizabeth Coleman	3	6	3
WC	(United States) Charlotte Chavatipon	2	3
Q	(Argentina) Ana Geller	6	6
Q	(United States) Elvina Kalieva	6	6
(Russia) Maria Timofeeva	2	2
Q	(Slovakia) Michaela Kadlečková	4	2
7	(Latvia) Kamilla Bartone	6	6

Second round
4	(Colombia) C Osorio	6	6
(United States) K Volynets	4	4
(China) Z Bai	3	4
13	(United States) A Forbes	6	6
12	(South Korea) S-h Park	6	6
Q	(Argentina) A Geller	4	4
Q	(United States) E Kalieva	0	1
7	(Latvia) K Bartone	6	6

Third round
4	(Colombia) C Osorio	7	7^{7}
13	(United States) A Forbes	5	6^{3}
12	(South Korea) S-h Park	1	3
7	(Latvia) K Bartone	6	6

Quarterfinals
4	(Colombia) C Osorio	6	6
7	(Latvia) K Bartone	3	4

=== Bottom half ===
==== Section 3 ====
First round
5	(China) Zheng Qinwen	6	6
WC	(United States) India Houghton	3	4
WC	(United States) Maribella Zamarripa	6	6
(Colombia) Antonia Samudio	0	2
(Canada) Mélodie Collard	6	6
(United States) Chloe Beck	1	1
(Russia) Daria Frayman	1	6	6
11	(Thailand) Mananchaya Sawangkaew	6	2	3
14	(Russia) Anastasia Tikhonova	6	4	0
(Hungary) Adrienn Nagy	1	6	6
(Indonesia) Priska Madelyn Nugroho	2	6	6
Q	(United States) Skyler Marie Grace Grishuk	6	4	4
(France) Aubane Droguet	6	6
(Spain) Carlota Martínez Círez	2	2
(Latvia) Darja Semenistaja	0	7	5
3	(United States) Alexa Noel	6	5	7

Second round
5	(China) Q Zheng	6	6
WC	(United States) M Zamarripa	0	2
(Canada) M Collard	2	2
(Russia) D Frayman	6	6
(Hungary) A Nagy	4	2
(Indonesia) PM Nugroho	6	6
(France) A Droguet	6^{1}	6	5
3	(United States) A Noel	7^{7}	3	7

Third round
5	(China) Q Zheng	6	6
(Russia) D Frayman	4	0
(Indonesia) PM Nugroho	6	6
3	(United States) A Noel	2	1

Quarterfinals
5	(China) Q Zheng	6	6
(Indonesia) PM Nugroho	3	3

==== Section 4 ====
First round
8	(United States) Hurricane Tyra Black	6	2^{r}
(Thailand) Mai Napatt Nirundorn	1	5
(Australia) Annerly Poulos	1	2
Q	(Philippines) Alex Eala	6	6
(France) Séléna Janicijevic	3	2
(Czech Republic) Linda Fruhvirtová	6	6
Q	(United States) Alexandra Yepifanova	6	6
9	(Burundi) Sada Nahimana	2	4
15	(Russia) Polina Kudermetova	4	6	6
LL	(Slovakia) Romana Čisovská	6	3	3
(United States) Savannah Broadus	6	6
(Ecuador) Mell Reasco	2	2
(Germany) Alexandra Vecic	1	2
WC	(United States) Reese Brantmeier	6	6
(Spain) Marta Custic	6	7^{7}
2	(France) Diane Parry	4	6^{4}

Second round
(Thailand) MN Nirundorn	7	6
Q	(Philippines) A Eala	5	3
(Czech Republic) L Fruhvirtová	5	4
Q	(United States) A Yepifanova	7	6
15	(Russia) P Kudermetova	7^{7}	6^{3}	7
(United States) S Broadus	6^{5}	7^{7}	5
WC	(United States) R Brantmeier	7^{7}	6^{5}	6
(Spain) M Custic	6^{4}	7^{7}	4

Third round
(Thailand) MN Nirundorn	6	5	6^{3}
Q	(United States) A Yepifanova	3	7	7^{7}
15	(Russia) P Kudermetova	1	3
WC	(United States) R Brantmeier	6	6

Quarterfinals
Q	(United States) A Yepifanova	4	6	6
WC	(United States) R Brantmeier	6	3	1

== Qualifying ==
=== Seeds ===
1. (Slovakia) Romana Čisovská (qualifying competition, lucky loser)
2. (China) Wang Jiaqi (first round)
3. (United States) Skyler Marie Grace Grishuk (qualified)
4. (Argentina) Ana Geller (qualified)
5. (China) Han Jiangxue (qualifying competition)
6. (Brazil) Ana Luiza Cruz (first round)
7. (Slovakia) Michaela Kadlečková (qualified)
8. (United States) Charlotte Owensby (first round)
9. (United States) Alexandra Yepifanova (qualified)
10. (Poland) Martyna Kubka (qualifying competition)
11. (United States) Emma Jackson (qualifying competition)
12. (Japan) Funa Kozaki (first round)
13. (United States) Kailey Evans (qualifying competition)
14. (United States) Kylie Collins (qualifying competition)
15. (Philippines) Alexandra Eala (qualified)
16. (United States) Tara Malik (first round)

=== Qualifiers ===
1. (Philippines) Alexandra Eala
2. (United States) Elvina Kalieva
3. (United States) Skyler Marie Grace Grishuk
4. (Argentina) Ana Geller
5. (United States) Alexandra Yepifanova
6. (Northern Mariana Islands) Carol Young Suh Lee
7. (Slovakia) Michaela Kadlečková
8. (Puerto Rico) Lauren Anzalotta Kynoch

=== Lucky loser ===
1. (Slovakia) Romana Čisovská

=== Draw ===
==== First qualifier ====
First round
1	(Slovakia) Romana Čisovská	7	6
(United States) Jenna DeFalco	5	3
WC	(United States) Kimmi Hance	3	5
15	(Philippines) Alex Eala	6	7

Qualifying competition
1	(Slovakia) Romana Čisovská	3	0
15	(Philippines) Alex Eala	6	6

==== Second qualifier ====
First round
2	(China) Wang Jiaqi	3	1
(United States) Elvina Kalieva	6	6
(Finland) Alexandra Anttila	7^{8}	6^{4}	3
13	(United States) Kailey Evans	6^{6}	7^{7}	6

Qualifying competition
(United States) Elvina Kalieva	6	7
13	(United States) Kailey Evans	2	5

==== Third qualifier ====
First round
3	(United States) Skyler Marie Grace Grishuk	6	2	6
WC	(United States) Karina Miller	0	6	0
WC	(United States) Valencia Xu	1	6^{3}
10	(Poland) Martyna Kubka	6	7^{7}

Qualifying competition
3	(United States) Skyler Marie Grace Grishuk	2	7	6
10	(Poland) Martyna Kubka	6	5	4

==== Fourth qualifier ====
First round
4	(Argentina) Ana Geller	7^{7}	6
(United States) Gianna Pielet	6^{4}	4
WC	(Japan) Mizuki Yamaguchi	1	7^{7}	3
11	(United States) Emma Jackson	6	6^{3}	6

Qualifying competition
4	(Argentina) Ana Geller	6	6
11	(United States) Emma Jackson	1	2

==== Fifth qualifier ====
First round
5	(China) Han Jiangxue	6	7
(United States) Madison Sieg	3	5
(France) Célia-Belle Mohr	4	6^{2}
9	(United States) Alexandra Yepifanova	6	7^{7}

Qualifying competition
5	(China) Han Jiangxue	6	2	2
9	(United States) Alexandra Yepifanova	1	6	6

==== Sixth qualifier ====
First round
6	(Brazil) Ana Luiza Cruz	2	5
(United States) Hibah Shaikh	6	7
(Northern Mariana Islands) Carol Young Suh Lee	6	6
16	(United States) Tara Malik	3	4

Qualifying competition
(United States) Hibah Shaikh	2	3
(Northern Mariana Islands) Carol Young Suh Lee	6	6

==== Seventh qualifier ====
First round
7	(Slovakia) Michaela Kadlečková	6	6
WC	(United States) Tsehay Driscoll	3	4
(Switzerland) Nina Geissler	4	2
14	(United States) Kylie Collins	6	6

Qualifying competition
7	(Slovakia) Michaela Kadlečková	6	3	6
14	(United States) Kylie Collins	4	6	4

==== Eighth qualifier ====
First round
8	(United States) Charlotte Owensby	3	0
(Puerto Rico) Lauren Anzalotta Kynoch	6	6
WC	(United States) Qavia Lopez	6	6
12	(Japan) Funa Kozaki	1	4

Qualifying competition
(Puerto Rico) Lauren Anzalotta Kynoch	6	6
WC	(United States) Qavia Lopez	4	1
