= 2019 US Open – Girls' doubles =

Girls' doubles
- 2019 US Open

Final
- Champions: (Latvia) Kamilla Bartone (Russia) Oksana Selekhmeteva
- Runners-up: (France) Aubane Droguet (France) Séléna Janicijevic
- Score: 7–5, 7–6^{(8–6)}

Events
Singles	men	women		boys	girls
Doubles	men	women	mixed	boys	girls
WC Singles	men	women	quad
WC Doubles	men	women	quad
Legends	men	women	mixed
- US Open

Kamilla Bartone and Oksana Selekhmeteva won the girls' doubles tennis title at the 2019 US Open, defeating Aubane Droguet and Séléna Janicijevic in the final, 7–5, 7–6^{(8–6)}.

Cori Gauff and Caty McNally were the defending champions, but chose not to participate, having already competed in the women's doubles.

== Seeds ==
1. (United States) Alexa Noel / (France) Diane Parry (quarterfinals)
2. (Burundi) Sada Nahimana / (South Korea) Park So-hyun (second round)
3. (Japan) Natsumi Kawaguchi / (Hungary) Adrienn Nagy (semifinals)
4. (China) Bai Zhuoxuan / (China) Zheng Qinwen (first round)
5. (Latvia) Kamilla Bartone / (Russia) Oksana Selekhmeteva (champions)
6. (United States) Savannah Broadus / (United States) Abigail Forbes (quarterfinals)
7. (Russia) Alina Charaeva / (Spain) Marta Custic (second round)
8. (United States) Chloe Beck / (United States) Hurricane Tyra Black (first round)

== Draw ==
Key

- Q = Qualifier
- WC = Wild card
- LL = Lucky loser
- Alt = Alternate
- ITF = ITF entry
- PR = Protected ranking
- SR = Special ranking
- SE = Special exempt
- JE = Junior exempt
- JR = Junior Accelerator Programme entrant
- CO = College Accelerator Programme entrant
- NG = Next Gen Accelerator Program entrant
- w/o = Walkover
- r = Retired
- d = Defaulted

=== Finals ===
Semifinals
5	(Latvia) Kamilla Bartone (Russia) Oksana Selekhmeteva	7	2	[10]
3	(Japan) Natsumi Kawaguchi (Hungary) Adrienn Nagy	5	6	[7]
(France) Aubane Droguet (France) Séléna Janicijevic	7	4	[12]
(Canada) Mélodie Collard (Hong Kong) Cody Wong Hong-yi	5	6	[10]

Final
5	(Latvia) Kamilla Bartone (Russia) Oksana Selekhmeteva	7	7^{8}
(France) Aubane Droguet (France) Séléna Janicijevic	5	6^{6}

=== Top half ===
First round
1	(United States) Alexa Noel (France) Diane Parry	6	6
Alt	(United States) India Houghton (Northern Mariana Islands) Carol Young Suh Lee	1	4
WC	(United States) Reese Brantmeier (United States) Kimmi Hance	3	1
(Slovakia) Romana Čisovská (Russia) Anastasia Tikhonova	6	6
WC	(United States) Allura Zamarripa (United States) Maribella Zamarripa	5	7	[2]
(Chinese Taipei) Joanna Garland (Thailand) Mananchaya Sawangkaew	7	5	[10]
(Indonesia) Priska Madelyn Nugroho (Australia) Annerly Poulos	1	0
5	(Latvia) Kamilla Bartone (Russia) Oksana Selekhmeteva	6	6
3	(Japan) Natsumi Kawaguchi (Hungary) Adrienn Nagy	6	6
(Russia) Daria Frayman (Russia) Maria Timofeeva	4	4
(France) Carole Monnet (Latvia) Darja Semenistaja	6	6
(Spain) Carlota Martínez Círez (Spain) Ane Mintegi del Olmo	1	2
(Argentina) Ana Geller (United States) Skyler Marie Grace Grishuk	4	1
(Sweden) Caijsa Hennemann (Germany) Alexandra Vecic	6	6
(Thailand) Thasaporn Naklo (Thailand) Mai Napatt Nirundorn	7^{9}	0	[10]
8	(United States) Chloe Beck (United States) Hurricane Tyra Black	6^{7}	6	[8]

Second round
1	(United States) A Noel (France) D Parry	6	6
(Slovakia) R Čisovská (Russia) A Tikhonova	2	2
(Chinese Taipei) J Garland (Thailand) M Sawangkaew	3	4
5	(Latvia) K Bartone (Russia) O Selekhmeteva	6	6
3	(Japan) N Kawaguchi (Hungary) A Nagy	6	6
(France) C Monnet (Latvia) D Semenistaja	1	0
(Sweden) C Hennemann (Germany) A Vecic	6	1	[10]
(Thailand) T Naklo (Thailand) MN Nirundorn	3	6	[7]

Quarterfinals
1	(United States) A Noel (France) D Parry	5	4
5	(Latvia) K Bartone (Russia) O Selekhmeteva	7	6
3	(Japan) N Kawaguchi (Hungary) A Nagy	6	6
(Sweden) C Hennemann (Germany) A Vecic	2	3

Semifinals
5	(Latvia) K Bartone (Russia) O Selekhmeteva	7	2	[10]
3	(Japan) N Kawaguchi (Hungary) A Nagy	5	6	[7]

=== Bottom half ===
First round
7	(Russia) Alina Charaeva (Spain) Marta Custic	6	6
(United States) Charlotte Chavatipon (United States) Alexandra Yepifanova	3	0
(Spain) Jéssica Bouzas Maneiro (Malta) Helene Pellicano	6^{3}	4
(France) Elsa Jacquemot (Russia) Diana Shnaider	7^{7}	6
(Philippines) Alex Eala (United States) Elvina Kalieva	7	6
WC	(United States) Elizabeth Coleman (United States) Kailey Evans	5	1
(France) Aubane Droguet (France) Séléna Janicijevic	0	6	[11]
4	(China) Bai Zhuoxuan (China) Zheng Qinwen	6	4	[9]
6	(United States) Savannah Broadus (United States) Abigail Forbes	6	4	[10]
(Puerto Rico) Lauren Anzalotta Kynoch (Slovakia) Michaela Kadlečková	0	6	[6]
(Ecuador) Mell Reasco (Colombia) Antonia Samudio	2	5
(Russia) Polina Kudermetova (United States) Robin Montgomery	6	7
WC	(United States) Gabriella Price (United States) Katrina Scott	3	3
(Canada) Mélodie Collard (Hong Kong) Cody Wong Hong-yi	6	6
(Czech Republic) Linda Fruhvirtová (Poland) Martyna Kubka	1	6	[8]
2	(Burundi) Sada Nahimana (South Korea) Park So-hyun	6	3	[10]

Second round
7	(Russia) A Charaeva (Spain) M Custic	6	3	[5]
(France) E Jacquemot (Russia) D Shnaider	3	6	[10]
(Philippines) A Eala (United States) E Kalieva	3	3
(France) A Droguet (France) S Janicijevic	6	6
6	(United States) S Broadus (United States) A Forbes	6	3	[14]
(Russia) P Kudermetova (United States) R Montgomery	3	6	[12]
(Canada) M Collard (Hong Kong) CH-y Wong	6	6
2	(Burundi) S Nahimana (South Korea) S-h Park	4	2

Quarterfinals
(France) E Jacquemot (Russia) D Shnaider	4	4
(France) A Droguet (France) S Janicijevic	6	6
6	(United States) S Broadus (United States) A Forbes	4	4
(Canada) M Collard (Hong Kong) CH-y Wong	6	6

Semifinals
(France) A Droguet (France) S Janicijevic	7	4	[12]
(Canada) M Collard (Hong Kong) CH-y Wong	5	6	[10]
