= Kārlis Ozoliņš (tennis) =

Latvian tennis player (born 2002)

- Country (sports): Latvia
- Born: 15 June 2002 (age 24) Riga, Latvia
- Height: 1.96 m (6 ft 5 in)
- Plays: Right-handed (two-handed backhand)
- College: University of Illinois
- Coach: Ernests Gulbis
- Prize money: US $38,530

Singles
- Career record: 2–4 (at ATP Tour level, Grand Slam level, and in Davis Cup)
- Career titles: 0
- Highest ranking: No. 616 (25 May 2026)
- Current ranking: No. 665 (24 August 2026)

Grand Slam singles results
- Australian Open Junior: SF (2020)
- French Open Junior: 1R (2020)
- US Open Junior: 1R (2019)

Doubles
- Career record: 2–2 (at ATP Tour level, Grand Slam level, and in Davis Cup)
- Career titles: 0
- Highest ranking: No. 543 (18 May 2026)
- Current ranking: No. 544 (25 May 2026)

Team competitions
- Davis Cup: 1–1
- Last updated on: 25 August 2026.

Kārlis Ozoliņš (born 15 June 2002) is a Latvian tennis player. Ozoliņš has a career high ATP singles ranking of world No. 616 achieved on 25 May 2026 and a doubles ranking of No. 543 achieved on 18 May 2026.

== Career ==
As a junior, he had a career high ITF junior combined ranking of number 6 in the world achieved on 3 February 2020. He reached the boys' doubles final at the 2020 Australian Open alongside Mikolaj Lorens. They were defeated however, by Leandro Riedi and David Ionel in a very close three-set match 7–6^{(10–8)}, 5–7, [4–10].

Ozoliņš represents Latvia at the Davis Cup, where he has a W/L record of 0–1 in singles and 1–0 in doubles combining as 1–1.

== ATP Challenger and ITF World Tennis Tour finals ==
=== Singles: 1 (0–1) ===
Legend ATP Challenger (0–0) ITF World Tennis Tour (0–1)	Finals by surface Hard (0–1) Clay (0–0)

Result	W–L	Date	Tournament	Tier	Surface	Opponent	Score
Loss	0–1	Mar 2020	M15 Trnava, Slovakia	World Tennis Tour	Hard	(Ukraine) Danylo Kalenichenko	4–6, 4–6

== Junior Grand Slam finals ==
=== Doubles: 1 (1 runner-up) ===
Result	Year	Tournament	Surface	Partner	Opponents	Score
Loss	2020	(Australia) Australian Open	Hard	(Poland) Mikolaj Lorens	(Switzerland) Leandro Riedi (Romania) David Ionel	7–6^{(10–8)}, 5–7, [4–10]
