= Kamilla Bartone =

Latvian tennis player (born 2002)

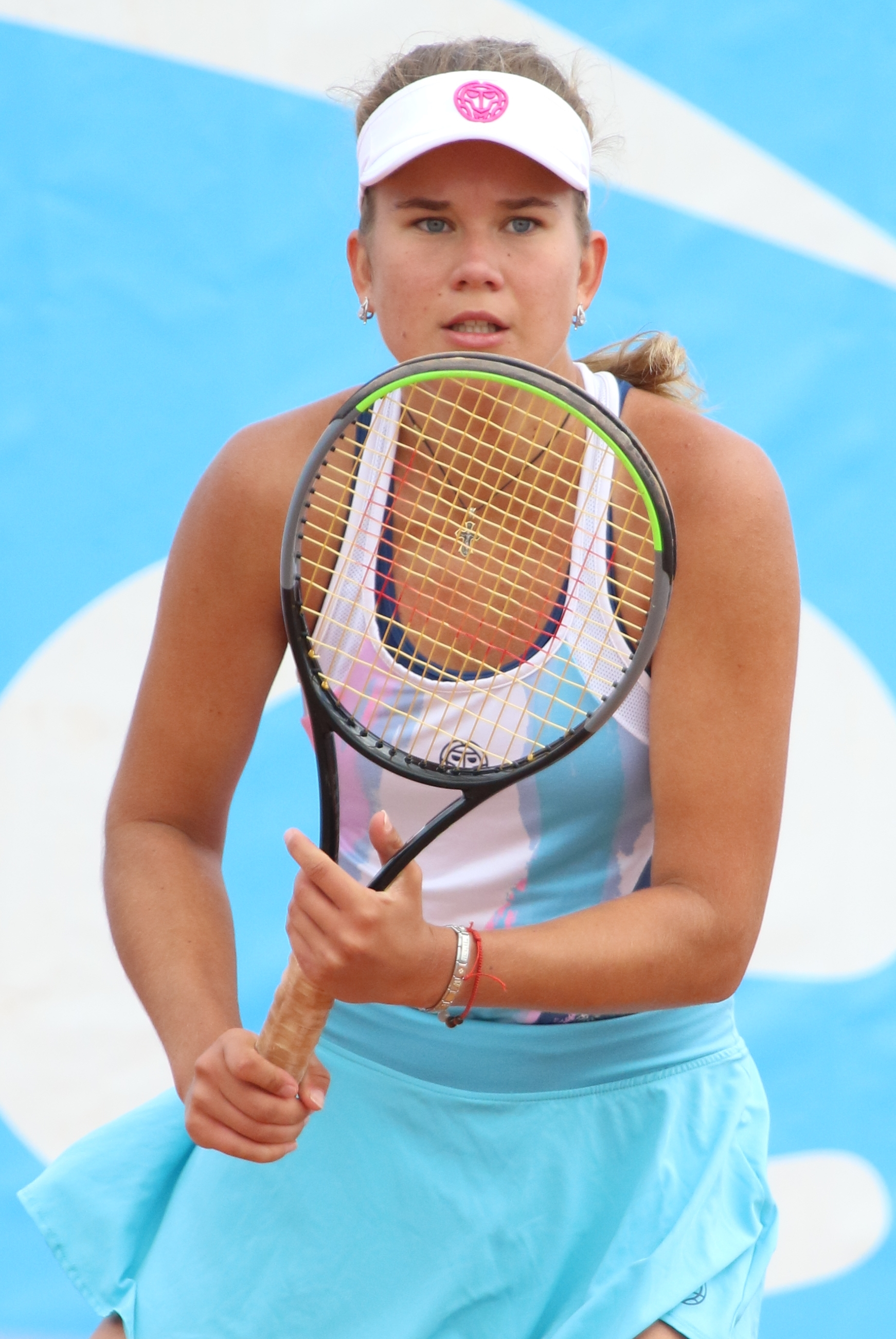
- Bartone at the 2021 Open de Biarritz
- Country (sports): Belarus, Latvia
- Born: 7 June 2002 (age 24) Riga, Latvia
- Plays: Right (two-handed backhand)
- Prize money: $66,898

Singles
- Career record: 153–100
- Career titles: 4 ITF
- Highest ranking: No. 348 (25 April 2022)
- Current ranking: No. 816 (10 August 2026)

Doubles
- Career record: 102–56
- Career titles: 11 ITF
- Highest ranking: No. 298 (25 November 2024)
- Current ranking: No. 646 (10 August 2026)
- Last updated on: 10 August 2026.

Kamilla Bartone (born 7 June 2002) is a Belarusian tennis player.

Bartone has a career-high junior combined ranking of No. 6, achieved on 21 October 2019.

She won the 2019 US Open on girls' doubles with Oksana Selekhmeteva.

Bartone made her WTA Tour main-draw debut at the 2019 Baltic Open in the doubles draw, partnering Ksenia Aleshina.

== Junior Grand Slam performance ==
Singles:

- Australian Open: QF (2019)
- French Open: 3R (2019)
- Wimbledon: 1R (2019)
- US Open: QF (2019)

Doubles:

- Australian Open: SF (2020)
- French Open: SF (2020)
- Wimbledon: F (2019)
- US Open: W (2019)

== ITF Circuit finals ==
=== Singles: 7 (5 titles, 2 runner-ups) ===
Legend W15 tournaments (5–2)	Finals by surface Hard (4–1) Clay (1–1)

Result	W–L	Date	Tournament	Tier	Surface	Opponent	Score
Win	1–0	Nov 2020	ITF Haabneeme, Estonia	W15	Hard (i)	(Netherlands) Stéphanie Visscher	6–3, 6–4
Win	2–0	Oct 2023	ITF Sharm El Sheikh, Egypt	W15	Hard	(Egypt) Lamis Alhussein Abdel Aziz	7–5, 2–6, 7–5
Loss	2–1	Jul 2024	ITF Kuršumlijska Banja, Serbia	W15	Clay	(Latvia) Darja Viďmanová	1–6, 6–7^{(5)}
Win	3–1	Jul 2024	ITF Kuršumlijska Banja, Serbia	W15	Clay	(Serbia) Natalija Senić	6–3, 6–4
Loss	3–2	Nov 2024	ITF Sharm El Sheikh, Egypt	W15	Hard	(Chinese Taipei) Joanna Garland	1–6, 1–6
Win	4–2	Sep 2025	ITF Sharm El Sheikh, Egypt	W15	Hard	(Lithuania) Andrė Lukošiūtė	7–6^{(5)}, 5–7, 7–6^{(5)}
Win	5–2	Oct 2026	ITF Sharm El Sheikh, Egypt	W15	Hard	(Egypt) Sandra Samir	4–6, 6–4, 6–4

=== Doubles: 18 (11 titles, 7 runner–ups) ===
Legend W40 tournaments (1–0) W25/35 tournaments (4–4) W15 tournaments (6–3)	Finals by surface Hard (8–5) Clay (3–2)

Result	W–L	Date	Tournament	Tier	Surface	Partner	Opponents	Score
Win	1–0	Oct 2021	ITF Hamburg, Germany	W25	Hard (i)	(Switzerland) Ylena In-Albon	(Australia) Olivia Gadecki (Burundi) Sada Nahimana	6–4, 6–3
Win	2–0	Mar 2022	Nur-Sultan Challenger, Kazakhstan	W25	Clay	Ekaterina Makarova	(Czech Republic) Anna Sisková; Maria Timofeeva	1–6, 7–5, [10–8]
Loss	2–1	Jun 2022	ITF Denin, France	W25	Hard	(Bosnia and Herzegovina) Anita Wagner	(Germany) Katharina Hobgarski (Ukraine) Valeriya Strakhova	0–6, 4–6
Loss	2–2	Nov 2022	ITF Monastir, Tunisia	W15	Hard	(Serbia) Bojana Marinković	(Chinese Taipei) Tsao Chia-yi (Chinese Taipei) Wu Fang-hsien	0–6, 5–7
Win	3–2	Oct 2023	ITF Sharm El Sheikh, Egypt	W15	Hard	(Uzbekistan) Sevil Yuldasheva	Alisa Kummel; Ekaterina Makarova	6–2, 6–3
Win	4–2	Nov 2023	ITF Ortisei, Italy	W25	Hard (i)	(Italy) Anastasia Abbagnato	(Netherlands) Indy de Vroome (Serbia) Katarina Kozarov	6–4, 6–2
Win	5–2	Dec 2023	ITF Navi Mumbai, India	W40	Hard	Ekaterina Makarova	(Japan) Funa Kozaki (Japan) Misaki Matsuda	6–3, 1–6, [10–7]
Loss	5–3	Apr 2024	ITF Bujumbura, Burundi	W35	Clay	(Burundi) Sada Nahimana	(Poland) Weronika Falkowska (Netherlands) Stéphanie Visscher	3–6, 6–4, [5–10]
Win	6–3	Apr 2024	ITF Bujumbura, Burundi	W35	Clay	(Burundi) Sada Nahimana	(Switzerland) Naïma Karamoko (Latvia) Diāna Marcinkēviča	4–6, 6–3, [10–7]
Win	7–3	Jul 2024	ITF Kuršumlijska Banja, Serbia	W15	Clay	(Czech Republic) Darja Viďmanová	(Greece) Dimitra Pavlou (Serbia) Anja Stanković	6–4, 6–2
Win	8–3	Jul 2024	ITF Kuršumlijska Banja, Serbia	W15	Clay	(Czech Republic) Darja Viďmanová	(Netherlands) Madelief Hageman (Serbia) Draginja Vuković	6–3, 6–3
Win	9–3	Oct 2024	ITF Istanbul, Turkey	W35	Hard (i)	(Romania) Andreea Prisăcariu	(Sweden) Jacqueline Cabaj Awad (Croatia) Iva Primorac	6–4, 6–2
Loss	9–4	Dec 2024	ITF Sharm El Sheikh, Egypt	W35	Hard	(Romania) Andreea Prisăcariu	Polina Iatcenko (Slovakia) Katarína Kužmová	4–6, 4–6
Win	10–4	Sep 2025	ITF Sharm El Sheikh, Egypt	W15	Hard	(Netherlands) Madelief Hageman	(Denmark) Sarafina Hansen (Finland) Stella Remander	6–0, 6–3
Win	11–4	Sep 2025	ITF Sharm El Sheikh, Egypt	W15	Hard	(Netherlands) Madelief Hageman	(Kazakhstan) Asylzhan Arystanbekova (Kazakhstan) Ingkar Dyussebay	7–6^{(3)}, 4–6, [10–8]
Loss	11–5	Oct 2025	ITF Sharm El Sheikh, Egypt	W15	Hard	(Uzbekistan) Sevil Yuldasheva	(Egypt) Aya El Sayed (Egypt) Nada Fouad	1–6, 4–6
Loss	11–6	Dec 2025	ITF Sharm El Sheikh, Egypt	W35	Hard	(France) Yara Bartashevich	(United States) Savannah Broadus (United States) Hibah Shaikh	4–6, 4–6
Loss	11–7	Feb 2026	ITF Monastir, Tunisia	W15	Hard	(Bulgaria) Iva Ivanova	(Japan) Yuka Hosoki (New Zealand) Elyse Tse	6–7^{(8)}, 4–6

== Junior Grand Slam finals ==
=== Girls' doubles: 2 (1 title, 1 runner–up) ===
Result	Year	Tournament	Surface	Partner	Opponents	Score
Loss	2019	Wimbledon	Grass	(Russia) Oksana Selekhmeteva	(United States) Savannah Broadus (United States) Abigail Forbes	5–7, 7–5, 2–6
Win	2019	US Open	Hard	(Russia) Oksana Selekhmeteva	(France) Aubane Droguet (France) Séléna Janicijevic	7–5, 7–6^{(8–6)}

== ITF Junior Circuit finals ==
Legend
Grade A
Grade 1
Grade 2
Grade 3
Grade 4
Grade 5

=== Singles (4–3) ===
Result	W–L	Date	Tournament	Grade	Surface	Opponent	Score
Loss	0–1	May 2016	ITF Tallinn, Estonia	Grade 4	Clay	(Finland) Oona Orpana	3–6, 3–6
Loss	0–2	Jul 2016	ITF Tallinn, Estonia	Grade 4	Hard	(Finland) Oona Orpana	6–4, 0–6, 2–6
Win	1–2	May 2018	ITF Villach, Austria	Grade 2	Clay	(Czech Republic) Alexandra Silná	6–1, 6–2
Loss	1–3	Jun 2018	ITF Gladbeck, Germany	Grade 2	Clay	(Ukraine) Margaryta Bilokin	2–6, 4–6
Win	2–3	Jul 2018	ITF Castricum, Netherlands	Grade 2	Clay	(France) Elsa Jacquemot	6–1, 4–6, 7–5
Win	3–3	Nov 2018	ITF Campeche, Mexico	Grade 1	Hard	(United States) Hurricane Tyra Black	6–0, 6–2
Win	4–3	Aug 2019	ITF College Park, US	Grade 1	Hard	(Thailand) Mai Napatt Nirundorn	6–2, 3–6, 6–0

=== Doubles (5–3) ===
Result	W–L	Date	Tournament	Grade	Surface	Partner	Opponents	Score
Win	1–0	Sep 2015	ITF Liepāja, Latvia	Grade 5	Clay	(Belarus) Kseniya Yersh	(Russia) Maria Krupenina (Belarus) Shalimar Talbi	6–2, 6–3
Win	2–0	Sep 2016	ITF Jūrmala, Latvia	Grade 4	Hard	(Latvia) Deniza Marcinkēviča	(Sweden) Caijsa Hennemann (Sweden) Melis Yasar	6–2, 6–4
Loss	2–1	May 2017	ITF Ventspils, Latvia	Grade 4	Hard	(Latvia) Deniza Marcinkēviča	(Russia) Elizaveta Dementyeva (Russia) Veronika Pepelyaeva	2–6, 6–3, [5–10]
Win	3–1	Feb 2018	ITF Hamburg, Germany	Grade 4	Hard (i)	(Germany) Santa Strombach	(Slovakia) Vanda Vargová (Germany) Angelina Wirges	6–3, 6–2
Win	4–1	Apr 2019	ITF Vrsar, Croatia	Grade 1	Clay	(Russia) Oksana Selekhmeteva	(Israel) Shavit Kimchi (Hungary) Adrienn Nagy	7–6^{(7–2)}, 6–1
Loss	4–2	Jun 2019	ITF Nottingham, UK	Grade 1	Grass	(France) Giulia Morlet	(Ukraine) Liubov Kostenko (Burundi) Sada Nahimana	6–4, 6–7^{(11–13)}, [7–10]
Loss	4–3	Jul 2019	ITF Roehampton, UK	Grade 1	Grass	(Russia) Oksana Selekhmeteva	(Spain) Marta Custic (United States) Elizabeth Mandlik	7–5, 6–7^{(4–7)}, [3–10]
Win	5–3	Aug 2019	ITF College Park, US	Grade 1	Hard	(United States) Robin Montgomery	(United States) Savannah Broadus (United States) Abigail Forbes	6–3, 7–5
