= Abigail Forbes =

American tennis player (born 2001)

Abbey Forbes
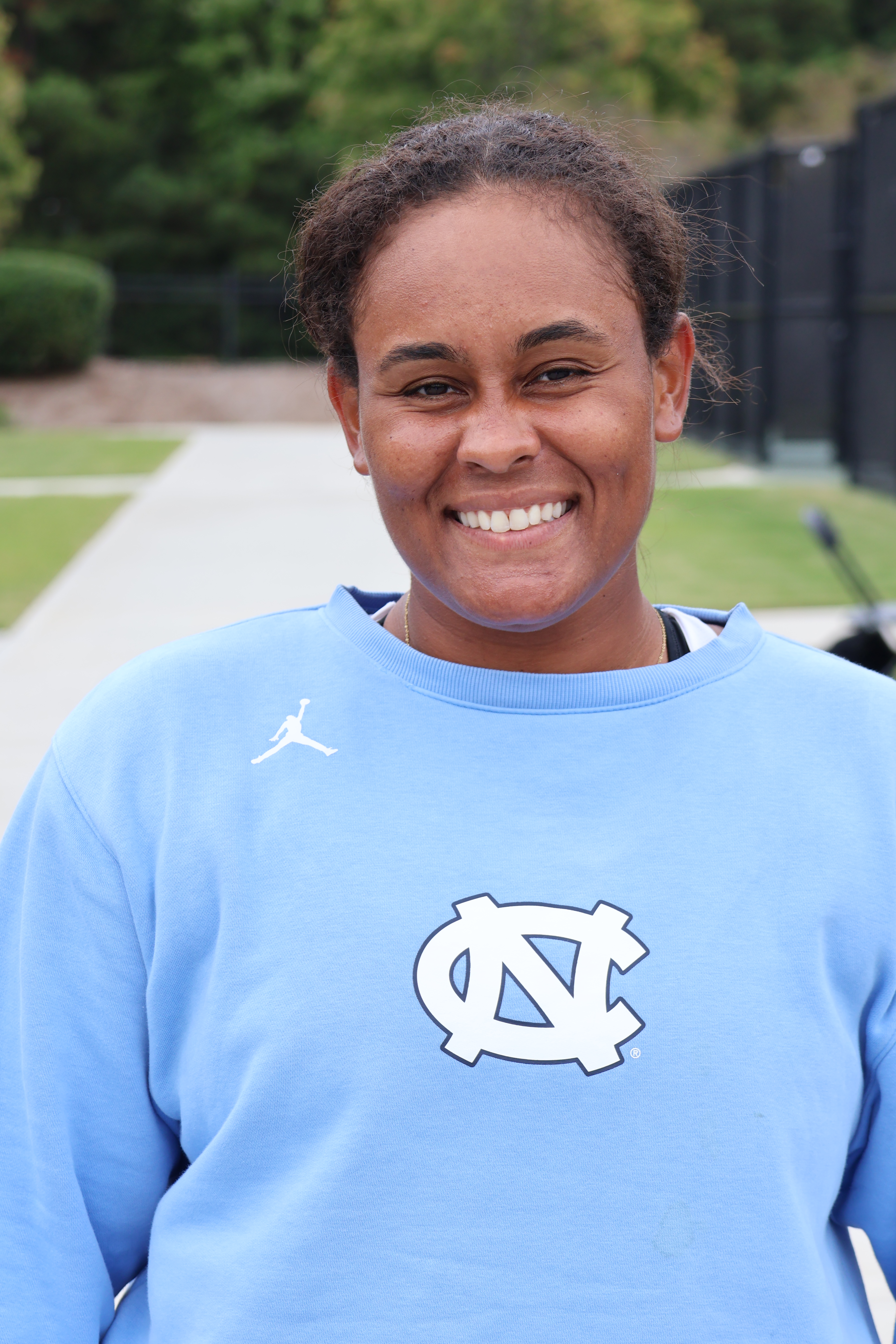
- Forbes in 2023
- Full name: Abigail Forbes
- Country (sports): United States
- Born: March 10, 2001 (age 25) Mineola, New York, U.S.
- Plays: Right-handed (two-handed backhand)
- College: UCLA (2019–2022); North Carolina (2022–2024)
- Prize money: $11,443

Singles
- Career record: 19–14

Grand Slam singles results
- US Open Junior: 3R (2019)

Doubles
- Career record: 1–3
- Highest ranking: No. 1194 (16 September 2019)
- Current ranking: No. 1218 (February 17, 2020)

Grand Slam doubles results
- US Open: 1R (2019)
- Wimbledon Junior: W (2019)
- Last updated on: February 21, 2020.

Abigail Forbes (born March 10, 2001) is an American tennis player.

== Early life ==
Forbes was born in Mineola, New York, to Jamaican parents. She is the oldest of three siblings. Her younger brother, Matthew, is also a tennis player.

== Career ==
Forbes won the 2019 Wimbledon girls' doubles title with Savannah Broadus, joining three other Americans in the finals of the junior tournaments. On August 10, 2019, she and Alexa Noel won the USTA Girls 18s National Championships in doubles, earning them a wild-card entry into the main draw of the 2019 US Open.

Forbes has a career-high ITF junior combined ranking of No. 16 achieved on October 14, 2019. She began attending UCLA for the fall 2019 semester.

After graduation, she enrolled in the UNC Kenan–Flagler Business School and joined the North Carolina Tar Heels tennis team. She won a national team title in her first season at North Carolina in 2023.

== Junior Grand Slam titles ==
=== Doubles: 1 (1 title) ===
Result	Year	Tournament	Surface	Partner	Opponents	Score
Winner	2019	Wimbledon	Grass	(United States) Savannah Broadus	(Latvia) Kamilla Bartone (Russia) Oksana Selekhmeteva	7–5, 5–7, 6–2
