= 2019 US Open – Boys' doubles =

Boys' doubles
- 2019 US Open

Final
- Champions: (United States) Eliot Spizzirri (United States) Tyler Zink
- Runners-up: (Czech Republic) Andrew Paulson (Belarus) Alexander Zgirovsky
- Score: 7–6^{(7–4)}, 6–4

Events
| Singles | men | women | | boys | girls |
| Doubles | men | women | mixed | boys | girls |
| WC Singles | men | women | quad |
| WC Doubles | men | women | quad |
| Legends | men | women | mixed |
- US Open

Eliot Spizzirri and Tyler Zink won the boys' doubles tennis title at the 2019 US Open, defeating Andrew Paulson and Alexander Zgirovsky in the final, 7–6^{(7–4)}, 6–4.

Adrian Andreev and Anton Matusevich were the defending champions, but chose not to participate.

== Seeds ==
1. (Japan) Shintaro Mochizuki / (Argentina) Thiago Agustín Tirante (withdrew)
2. (United States) Martin Damm / (United States) Toby Kodat (first round)
3. (Czech Republic) Jonáš Forejtek / (Czech Republic) Jiří Lehečka (quarterfinals)
4. (United States) Brandon Nakashima / (France) Valentin Royer (quarterfinals)
5. (Canada) Liam Draxl / (United States) Govind Nanda (semifinals)
6. (Spain) Pablo Llamas Ruiz / (Belgium) Gauthier Onclin (quarterfinals)
7. (France) Arthur Cazaux / (France) Harold Mayot (quarterfinals)
8. (Canada) Taha Baadi / (Czech Republic) Dalibor Svrčina (first round)

== Draw ==
Key

- Q = Qualifier
- WC = Wild card
- LL = Lucky loser
- Alt = Alternate
- ITF = ITF entry
- PR = Protected ranking
- SR = Special ranking
- SE = Special exempt
- JE = Junior exempt
- JR = Junior Accelerator Programme entrant
- CO = College Accelerator Programme entrant
- NG = Next Gen Accelerator Program entrant
- w/o = Walkover
- r = Retired
- d = Defaulted

=== Finals ===
Semifinals
(United States) Eliot Spizzirri (United States) Tyler Zink | 6^{4} | 6 | [10]
5 | (Canada) Liam Draxl (United States) Govind Nanda | 7^{7} | 3 | [7]
(Romania) Nicholas David Ionel (Poland) Wojciech Marek | 4 | 2
(Czech Republic) Andrew Paulson (Belarus) Alexander Zgirovsky | 6 | 6

Final
(United States) Eliot Spizzirri (United States) Tyler Zink | 7^{7} | 6
(Czech Republic) Andrew Paulson (Belarus) Alexander Zgirovsky | 6^{4} | 4

=== Top half ===
First round
Alt | (Japan) Ryuhei Azuma (Japan) Taiyo Yamanaka | 3 | 3
(United States) Eliot Spizzirri (United States) Tyler Zink | 6 | 6
(Australia) Stefan Storch (Ukraine) Eric Vanshelboim | 5 | 6 | [10]
(Brazil) Matheus Pucinelli de Almeida (Brazil) Natan Rodrigues | 7 | 4 | [6]
(United States) Blaise Bicknell (Italy) Lorenzo Rottoli | 6^{1} | 2
WC | (United States) Ronan Jachuck (United States) Andres Martin | 7^{7} | 6
(Italy) Matteo Arnaldi (Italy) Francesco Passaro | 6^{6} | 3
7 | (France) Arthur Cazaux (France) Harold Mayot | 7^{8} | 6
4 | (United States) Brandon Nakashima (France) Valentin Royer | 6 | 6
(United Kingdom) Arthur Fery (Hungary) Péter Makk | 1 | 1
(Sweden) Kevin Chahoud (Argentina) Alejo Lorenzo Lingua Lavallén | 6^{6} | 6 | [10]
(United States) Robert Cash (United States) Cannon Kingsley | 7 | 2 | [6]
(Switzerland) Leandro Riedi (Switzerland) Dominic Stricker | 6 | 6
WC | (United States) Alexander Bernard (United States) Ronald Hohmann | 2 | 4
(Japan) Shunsuke Mitsui (United Kingdom) Harry Wendelken | 2 | 2
5 | (Canada) Liam Draxl (United States) Govind Nanda | 6 | 6

Second round
(United States) E Spizzirri (United States) T Zink | 6^{3} | 6 | [10]
(Australia) S Storch (Ukraine) E Vanshelboim | 7^{7} | 1 | [5]
WC | (United States) R Jachuck (United States) A Martin | 6^{5} | 3
7 | (France) A Cazaux (France) H Mayot | 7^{7} | 6
4 | (United States) B Nakashima (France) V Royer | 6 | 7^{7}
(Sweden) K Chahoud (Argentina) AL Lingua Lavallén | 3 | 6^{3}
(Switzerland) L Riedi (Switzerland) D Stricker | 4 | 3
5 | (Canada) L Draxl (United States) G Nanda | 6 | 6

Quarterfinals
(United States) E Spizzirri (United States) T Zink | 6 | 6
7 | (France) A Cazaux (France) H Mayot | 0 | 4
4 | (United States) B Nakashima (France) V Royer | 6 | 3 | [7]
5 | (Canada) L Draxl (United States) G Nanda | 2 | 6 | [10]

Semifinals
(United States) E Spizzirri (United States) T Zink | 6^{4} | 6 | [10]
5 | (Canada) L Draxl (United States) G Nanda | 7^{7} | 3 | [7]

=== Bottom half ===
First round
8 | (Canada) Taha Baadi (Czech Republic) Dalibor Svrčina | 1 | 2
(Australia) Rinky Hijikata (Australia) Tristan Schoolkate | 6 | 6
(Romania) Nicholas David Ionel (Poland) Wojciech Marek | 4 | 6 | [11]
WC | (United States) Bruno Kuzuhara (United States) Victor Lilov | 6 | 4 | [9]
(Spain) Nicolás Álvarez Varona (Argentina) Juan Bautista Torres | 7 | 7
WC | (United States) Hugo Hashimoto (United States) Benjamin Kittay | 5 | 5
(Serbia) Hamad Međedović (Italy) Samuel Vincent Ruggeri | 0 | 1
3 | (Czech Republic) Jonáš Forejtek (Czech Republic) Jiří Lehečka | 6 | 6
6 | (Spain) Pablo Llamas Ruiz (Belgium) Gauthier Onclin | 6 | 6
(United States) Cash Hanzlik (United States) Aidan Mayo | 2 | 2
(Latvia) Kārlis Ozoliņš (Netherlands) Stijn Pel | 6 | 6^{8} | [5]
(France) Kyrian Jacquet (France) Giovanni Mpetshi Perricard | 4 | 7^{10} | [10]
Alt | (United States) Dali Blanch (United States) William Grant | 4 | 4
(Italy) Flavio Cobolli (Italy) Luca Nardi | 6 | 6
(Czech Republic) Andrew Paulson (Belarus) Alexander Zgirovsky | 5 | 7 | [10]
2 | (United States) Martin Damm (United States) Toby Kodat | 7 | 5 | [6]

Second round
(Australia) R Hijikata (Australia) T Schoolkate | 4 | 6^{3}
(Romania) ND Ionel (Poland) W Marek | 6 | 7^{7}
(Spain) N Álvarez Varona (Argentina) JB Torres | 2 | 2
3 | (Czech Republic) J Forejtek (Czech Republic) J Lehečka | 6 | 6
6 | (Spain) P Llamas Ruiz (Belgium) G Onclin | 6 | 7^{7}
(France) K Jacquet (France) G Mpetshi Perricard | 1 | 6^{5}
(Italy) F Cobolli (Italy) L Nardi | 4 | 4
(Czech Republic) A Paulson (Belarus) A Zgirovsky | 6 | 6

Quarterfinals
(Romania) ND Ionel (Poland) W Marek | 6 | 6
3 | (Czech Republic) J Forejtek (Czech Republic) J Lehečka | 3 | 1
6 | (Spain) P Llamas Ruiz (Belgium) G Onclin | 5 | 6 | [8]
(Czech Republic) A Paulson (Belarus) A Zgirovsky | 7 | 3 | [10]

Semifinals
(Romania) ND Ionel (Poland) W Marek | 4 | 2
(Czech Republic) A Paulson (Belarus) A Zgirovsky | 6 | 6
