= 2019 US Open – Women's doubles =

Women's doubles
- 2019 US Open

Final
- Champions: (Belgium) Elise Mertens (Belarus) Aryna Sabalenka
- Runners-up: (Belarus) Victoria Azarenka (Australia) Ashleigh Barty
- Score: 7–5, 7–5

Details
- Draw: 64 (7WC)
- Seeds: 16

Events
Singles	men	women		boys	girls
Doubles	men	women	mixed	boys	girls
WC Singles	men	women	quad
WC Doubles	men	women	quad
Legends	men	women	mixed
- US Open

Elise Mertens and Aryna Sabalenka defeated Ashleigh Barty and Victoria Azarenka in the final, 7–5, 7–5, to win the women's doubles tennis title at the 2019 US Open. It was both players' first major doubles title.

This was the first Grand Slam final ever contested between two Belarusian players, with Aliaksandra Sasnovich, partnering Slovak Viktória Kužmová, also reaching the semifinals, the first time three Belarusians advanced to the penultimate rounds of any Grand Slam event since Belarus's independence.

Barbora Strýcová retained the WTA no. 1 doubles ranking after the tournament. Kristina Mladenovic was also in contention for the top ranking at the start of the tournament.

Barty and CoCo Vandeweghe were the defending champions, but chose not to participate together. Barty played alongside Azarenka and lost in the final. Vandeweghe teamed up with Bethanie Mattek-Sands, but lost in the first round to Magda Linette and Iga Świątek.

== Seeds ==
1. (Hungary) Tímea Babos / (France) Kristina Mladenovic (quarterfinals)
2. (Chinese Taipei) Hsieh Su-wei / (Czech Republic) Barbora Strýcová (third round)
3. (Canada) Gabriela Dabrowski / (China) Xu Yifan (quarterfinals)
4. (Belgium) Elise Mertens / (Belarus) Aryna Sabalenka (champions)
5. (Germany) Anna-Lena Grönefeld / (Netherlands) Demi Schuurs (second round)
6. (Australia) Samantha Stosur / (China) Zhang Shuai (first round)
7. (Chinese Taipei) Chan Hao-ching / (Chinese Taipei) Latisha Chan (second round)
8. (Belarus) Victoria Azarenka / (Australia) Ashleigh Barty (final)

9. (United States) Nicole Melichar / (Czech Republic) Květa Peschke (second round)
10. (Czech Republic) Lucie Hradecká / (Slovenia) Andreja Klepač (first round)
11. (Belgium) Kirsten Flipkens / (Sweden) Johanna Larsson (first round)
12. (China) Duan Yingying / (China) Zheng Saisai (quarterfinals)
13. (Croatia) Darija Jurak / (Spain) María José Martínez Sánchez (first round)
14. (Ukraine) Lyudmyla Kichenok / (Latvia) Jeļena Ostapenko (quarterfinals)
15. (Russia) Veronika Kudermetova / (Kazakhstan) Galina Voskoboeva (first round)
16. (United States) Raquel Atawo / (United States) Asia Muhammad (first round)

Click on the seed number of a player to go to their draw section.

== Draw ==
Key

- Q = Qualifier
- WC = Wild card
- LL = Lucky loser
- Alt = Alternate
- ITF = ITF entry
- PR = Protected ranking
- SR = Special ranking
- SE = Special exempt
- JE = Junior exempt
- JR = Junior Accelerator Programme entrant
- CO = College Accelerator Programme entrant
- NG = Next Gen Accelerator Program entrant
- w/o = Walkover
- r = Retired
- d = Defaulted

=== Finals ===
Quarterfinals
1	(Hungary) Tímea Babos (France) Kristina Mladenovic	6	5	1
8	(Belarus) Victoria Azarenka (Australia) Ashleigh Barty	2	7	6
3	(Canada) Gabriela Dabrowski (China) Xu Yifan	6	3	3
(Slovakia) Viktória Kužmová (Belarus) Aliaksandra Sasnovich	2	6	6
12	(China) Duan Yingying (China) Zheng Saisai	4	3
4	(Belgium) Elise Mertens (Belarus) Aryna Sabalenka	6	6
PR	(United States) Caroline Dolehide (United States) Vania King	7^{7}	6
14	(Ukraine) Lyudmyla Kichenok (Latvia) Jeļena Ostapenko	6^{2}	4

Semifinals
8	(Belarus) Victoria Azarenka (Australia) Ashleigh Barty	6	6
(Slovakia) Viktória Kužmová (Belarus) Aliaksandra Sasnovich	0	1
4	(Belgium) Elise Mertens (Belarus) Aryna Sabalenka	4	6	6
PR	(United States) Caroline Dolehide (United States) Vania King	6	3	4

Final
8	(Belarus) Victoria Azarenka (Australia) Ashleigh Barty	5	5
4	(Belgium) Elise Mertens (Belarus) Aryna Sabalenka	7	7

=== Top half ===
==== Section 1 ====
First round
1	(Hungary) T Babos (France) K Mladenovic	6	6
(Australia) J Moore (Mexico) G Olmos	3	2
(United States) M Brengle (Japan) E Shibahara	6	0	4
(Russia) E Alexandrova (Georgia (country)) O Kalashnikova	2	6	6
(Puerto Rico) M Puig (Ukraine) D Yastremska	6	4	3
(Russia) A Kalinskaya (Kazakhstan) Y Putintseva	3	6	6
(China) S Peng (Poland) A Rosolska	6	6
13	(Croatia) D Jurak (Spain) MJ Martínez Sánchez	1	4
9	(United States) N Melichar (Czech Republic) K Peschke	7^{7}	6
(Japan) N Hibino (Japan) M Kato	6^{4}	4
WC	(United States) C Gauff (United States) C McNally	7^{8}	6
(Germany) J Görges (Czech Republic) K Siniaková	6^{6}	2
WC	(United States) UM Arconada (United States) H Carter	1	3
(Ukraine) N Kichenok (United States) A Spears	6	6
(Russia) M Gasparyan (Romania) M Niculescu	6	1	1
8	(Belarus) V Azarenka (Australia) A Barty	4	6	6

Second round
1	(Hungary) T Babos (France) K Mladenovic	6	6
(Russia) E Alexandrova (Georgia (country)) O Kalashnikova	1	4
(Russia) A Kalinskaya (Kazakhstan) Y Putintseva	6	5	6
(China) S Peng (Poland) A Rosolska	2	7	3
9	(United States) N Melichar (Czech Republic) K Peschke	3	6^{9}
WC	(United States) C Gauff (United States) C McNally	6	7^{11}
(Ukraine) N Kichenok (United States) A Spears	3	6	6^{10}
8	(Belarus) V Azarenka (Australia) A Barty	6	3	7^{12}

Third round
1	(Hungary) T Babos (France) K Mladenovic	6	6
(Russia) A Kalinskaya (Kazakhstan) Y Putintseva	3	2
WC	(United States) C Gauff (United States) C McNally	0	1
8	(Belarus) V Azarenka (Australia) A Barty	6	6

Quarterfinals
1	(Hungary) T Babos (France) K Mladenovic	6	5	1
8	(Belarus) V Azarenka (Australia) A Barty	2	7	6

==== Section 2 ====
First round
3	(Canada) G Dabrowski (China) Y Xu	7	6
(Belarus) L Marozava (Slovenia) K Srebotnik	5	4
WC	(United States) K Ahn (United States) C McHale	6	6^{4}	6
WC	(United States) H Baptiste (United States) E Navarro	4	7^{7}	1
(Russia) N Dzalamidze (Kazakhstan) E Rybakina	7^{7}	4	5
(Greece) M Sakkari (Australia) A Tomljanović	6^{2}	6	7
(Germany) A-L Friedsam (Germany) L Siegemund	6	6
15	(Russia) V Kudermetova (Kazakhstan) G Voskoboeva	4	4
11	(Belgium) K Flipkens (Sweden) J Larsson	0	4
(Slovakia) V Kužmová (Belarus) A Sasnovich	6	6
(Canada) B Andreescu (Canada) S Fichman	2	3
WC	(United States) W Osuigwe (United States) T Townsend	6	6
(Japan) S Aoyama (Serbia) A Krunić	6	6
(Sweden) R Peterson (Slovenia) T Zidanšek	2	1
(United States) D Collins (Australia) E Perez	1	6	6
6	(Australia) S Stosur (China) S Zhang	6	4	4

Second round
3	(Canada) G Dabrowski (China) Y Xu	4	6	6
WC	(United States) K Ahn (United States) C McHale	6	1	1
(Greece) M Sakkari (Australia) A Tomljanović	4	1
(Germany) A-L Friedsam (Germany) L Siegemund	6	6
(Slovakia) V Kužmová (Belarus) A Sasnovich	6	6
WC	(United States) W Osuigwe (United States) T Townsend	4	2
(Japan) S Aoyama (Serbia) A Krunić	6^{1}	2
(United States) D Collins (Australia) E Perez	7^{7}	6

Third round
3	(Canada) G Dabrowski (China) Y Xu	6	0	6
(Germany) A-L Friedsam (Germany) L Siegemund	3	6	2
(Slovakia) V Kužmová (Belarus) A Sasnovich	7^{7}	5	7
(United States) D Collins (Australia) E Perez	6^{4}	7	5

Quarterfinals
3	(Canada) G Dabrowski (China) Y Xu	6	3	3
(Slovakia) V Kužmová (Belarus) A Sasnovich	2	6	6

=== Bottom half ===
==== Section 3 ====
First round
7	(Chinese Taipei) H-c Chan (Chinese Taipei) L Chan	6	6
(United States) S Kenin (Germany) T Maria	0	2
(Australia) M Adamczak (China) X Han	2	4
(Russia) A Pavlyuchenkova (Latvia) A Sevastova	6	6
(Slovenia) D Jakupović (United States) S Santamaria	6	6
WC	(United States) F Di Lorenzo (United States) A Li	1	0
(Spain) L Arruabarrena (United States) K Christian	4	1
12	(China) Y Duan (China) S Zheng	6	6
16	(United States) R Atawo (United States) A Muhammad	3	6	2
(Russia) D Kasatkina (Estonia) A Kontaveit	6	4	6
WC	(United States) A Forbes (United States) A Noel	6^{3}	2
(Switzerland) V Golubic (Spain) S Sorribes Tormo	7^{7}	6
(Czech Republic) K Muchová (Switzerland) J Teichmann	6	7^{7}
(Sweden) C Lister (Czech Republic) R Voráčová	1	6^{4}
(Russia) A Blinkova (China) Y Wang	3	4
4	(Belgium) E Mertens (Belarus) A Sabalenka	6	6

Second round
7	(Chinese Taipei) H-c Chan (Chinese Taipei) L Chan	6	0	3
(Russia) A Pavlyuchenkova (Latvia) A Sevastova	3	6	6
(Slovenia) D Jakupović (United States) S Santamaria	6	4	1
12	(China) Y Duan (China) S Zheng	3	6	6
(Russia) D Kasatkina (Estonia) A Kontaveit
(Switzerland) V Golubic (Spain) S Sorribes Tormo	w/o
(Czech Republic) K Muchová (Switzerland) J Teichmann	6^{1}	3
4	(Belgium) E Mertens (Belarus) A Sabalenka	7^{7}	6

Third round
(Russia) A Pavlyuchenkova (Latvia) A Sevastova	4	3
12	(China) Y Duan (China) S Zheng	6	6
(Switzerland) V Golubic (Spain) S Sorribes Tormo	3	5
4	(Belgium) E Mertens (Belarus) A Sabalenka	6	7

Quarterfinals
12	(China) Y Duan (China) S Zheng	4	3
4	(Belgium) E Mertens (Belarus) A Sabalenka	6	6

==== Section 4 ====
First round
5	(Germany) A-L Grönefeld (Netherlands) D Schuurs	6	6
(France) A Cornet (France) F Ferro	3	1
(Japan) E Hozumi (Japan) M Ninomiya	1	7^{7}	2
(Chile) A Guarachi (United States) B Pera	6	6^{4}	6
(United States) D Krawczyk (United States) J Pegula	7	4	2
PR	(United States) C Dolehide (United States) V King	5	6	6
(Tunisia) O Jabeur (Hungary) F Stollár	7	6
10	(Czech Republic) L Hradecká (Slovenia) A Klepač	5	3
14	(Ukraine) L Kichenok (Latvia) J Ostapenko	6	7^{10}
(Ukraine) K Kozlova (Russia) A Potapova	4	6^{8}
(United States) J Brady (United States) A Riske	2	6	3
(Romania) R Olaru (China) Z Yang	6	3	6
(United States) B Mattek-Sands (United States) C Vandeweghe	6	3	5
(Poland) M Linette (Poland) I Świątek	3	6	7
(United States) L Davis (United States) M Sanchez	4	1
2	(Chinese Taipei) S-w Hsieh (Czech Republic) B Strýcová	6	6

Second round
5	(Germany) A-L Grönefeld (Netherlands) D Schuurs	6^{3}	2
(Chile) A Guarachi (United States) B Pera	7^{7}	6
PR	(United States) C Dolehide (United States) V King	6	7
(Tunisia) O Jabeur (Hungary) F Stollár	4	5
14	(Ukraine) L Kichenok (Latvia) J Ostapenko	6	6
(Romania) R Olaru (China) Z Yang	3	4
(Poland) M Linette (Poland) I Świątek	4	6^{4}
2	(Chinese Taipei) S-w Hsieh (Czech Republic) B Strýcová	6	7^{7}

Third round
(Chile) A Guarachi (United States) B Pera	3	6^{4}
PR	(United States) C Dolehide (United States) V King	6	7^{7}
14	(Ukraine) L Kichenok (Latvia) J Ostapenko	6	6
2	(Chinese Taipei) S-w Hsieh (Czech Republic) B Strýcová	4	3

Quarterfinals
PR	(United States) C Dolehide (United States) V King	7^{7}	6
14	(Ukraine) L Kichenok (Latvia) J Ostapenko	6^{2}	4
