= 2019 US Open – Wheelchair men's singles =

Wheelchair men's singles
- 2019 US Open

Final
- Champion: (United Kingdom) Alfie Hewett
- Runner-up: (France) Stéphane Houdet
- Score: 7–6^{(11–9)}, 7–6^{(7–5)}

Events
Singles	men	women		boys	girls
Doubles	men	women	mixed	boys	girls
WC Singles	men	women	quad
WC Doubles	men	women	quad
Legends	men	women	mixed
← 2018 ·	US Open	· 2020 →

Defending champion Alfie Hewett defeated Stéphane Houdet in the final, 7–6^{(11–9)}, 7–6^{(7–5)} to win the men's singles wheelchair tennis title at the 2019 US Open. It was his second US Open singles title and third major singles title overall.

Gustavo Fernández was attempting to complete the Grand Slam, but was defeated by Houdet in the semifinals.

== Seeds ==
1. (Argentina) Gustavo Fernández (semifinals)
2. (Japan) Shingo Kunieda (quarterfinals)

== Draw ==
=== Key ===
- Q = Qualifier
- WC = Wild card
- LL = Lucky loser
- Alt = Alternate
- ITF = ITF entry
- PR = Protected ranking
- SR = Special ranking
- SE = Special exempt
- JE = Junior exempt
- JR = Junior Accelerator Programme entrant
- CO = College Accelerator Programme entrant
- NG = Next Gen Accelerator Program entrant
- w/o = Walkover
- r = Retired
- d = Defaulted

=== Bracket ===
Quarterfinals
1	(Argentina) Gustavo Fernández	7^{7}	6
(Sweden) Stefan Olsson	6^{4}	3
(France) Stéphane Houdet	4	6	6
(United Kingdom) Gordon Reid	6	4	1
WC	(France) Nicolas Peifer	6	6
(Belgium) Joachim Gérard	2	2
(United Kingdom) Alfie Hewett	6	7^{7}
2	(Japan) Shingo Kunieda	3	6^{2}

Semifinals
1	(Argentina) Gustavo Fernández	6	2	5
(France) Stéphane Houdet	3	6	7
WC	(France) Nicolas Peifer	3	4
(United Kingdom) Alfie Hewett	6	6

Final
(France) Stéphane Houdet	6^{9}	6^{5}
(United Kingdom) Alfie Hewett	7^{11}	7^{7}
