= 2019 US Open – Boys' singles =

Boys' singles
- 2019 US Open

Final
- Champion: (Czech Republic) Jonáš Forejtek
- Runner-up: (United States) Emilio Nava
- Score: 6–7^{(4–7)}, 6–0, 6–2

Events
Singles	men	women		boys	girls
Doubles	men	women	mixed	boys	girls
WC Singles	men	women	quad
WC Doubles	men	women	quad
Legends	men	women	mixed
- US Open

Jonáš Forejtek won the boys' singles tennis title at the 2019 US Open, defeating Emilio Nava 6–7^{(4–7)}, 6–0, 6–2 in the final.

Thiago Seyboth Wild was the defending champion, but he is no longer eligible to participate in junior events.

== Seeds ==
1. (Japan) Shintaro Mochizuki (second round)
2. (Denmark) Holger Vitus Nødskov Rune (second round)
3. (United States) Martin Damm (second round)
4. (Czech Republic) Jonáš Forejtek (champion)
5. (Argentina) Thiago Agustín Tirante (second round, retired)
6. (United States) Toby Kodat (second round)
7. (France) Harold Mayot (second round)
8. (United States) Emilio Nava (final)

9. (Belgium) Gauthier Onclin (third round)
10. (Canada) Liam Draxl (third round)
11. (United States) Brandon Nakashima (semifinals)
12. (Japan) Shunsuke Mitsui (first round)
13. (Japan) Keisuke Saitoh (first round)
14. (France) Valentin Royer (quarterfinals)
15. (Czech Republic) Jiří Lehečka (quarterfinals)
16. (Hungary) Péter Makk (third round)

== Main draw ==
Key

- Q = Qualifier
- WC = Wild card
- LL = Lucky loser
- Alt = Alternate
- ITF = ITF entry
- PR = Protected ranking
- SR = Special ranking
- SE = Special exempt
- JE = Junior exempt
- JR = Junior Accelerator Programme entrant
- CO = College Accelerator Programme entrant
- NG = Next Gen Accelerator Program entrant
- w/o = Walkover
- r = Retired
- d = Defaulted

=== Finals ===
Quarterfinals
14	(France) Valentin Royer	4	4
11	(United States) Brandon Nakashima	6	6
4	(Czech Republic) Jonáš Forejtek	3	7	7
Q	(Germany) Milan Welte	6	5	5
8/WC	(United States) Emilio Nava	6	6
15	(Czech Republic) Jiří Lehečka	3	1
(United States) Cannon Kingsley	7^{7}	6
(Switzerland) Dominic Stricker	6^{3}	4

Semifinals
11	(United States) Brandon Nakashima	6^{4}	3
4	(Czech Republic) Jonáš Forejtek	7^{7}	6
8/WC	(United States) Emilio Nava	6	6
(United States) Cannon Kingsley	4	0

Final
4	(Czech Republic) Jonáš Forejtek	6^{4}	6	6
8/WC	(United States) Emilio Nava	7^{7}	0	2

=== Top half ===
==== Section 1 ====
First round
1	(Japan) Shintaro Mochizuki	2	6	6
(Italy) Flavio Cobolli	6	3	4
Q	(United States) Blaise Bicknell	6^{3}	3
(Argentina) Alejo Lorenzo Lingua Lavallén	7^{7}	6
Q	(Czech Republic) Andrew Paulson	6	5	6
(Italy) Francesco Passaro	3	7	3
WC	(United States) Leighton Allen	3	6^{6}
14	(France) Valentin Royer	6	7^{8}
11	(United States) Brandon Nakashima	6	6
(France) Kyrian Jacquet	3	1
(Algeria) Youcef Rihane	4	4
(Switzerland) Leandro Riedi	6	6
(Australia) Tristan Schoolkate	6	6
(Romania) Nicholas David Ionel	2	3
(United States) Tyler Zink	6^{3}	0
7	(France) Harold Mayot	7^{7}	6

Second round
1	(Japan) S Mochizuki	6	6^{6}	2
(Argentina) AL Lingua Lavallén	4	7^{8}	6
Q	(Czech Republic) A Paulson	2	4
14	(France) V Royer	6	6
11	(United States) B Nakashima	6	3	6
(Switzerland) L Riedi	4	6	2
(Australia) T Schoolkate	6	6
7	(France) H Mayot	3	4

Third round
(Argentina) AL Lingua Lavallén	3	4
14	(France) V Royer	6	6
11	(United States) B Nakashima	6	6
(Australia) T Schoolkate	1	4

Quarterfinals
14	(France) V Royer	4	4
11	(United States) B Nakashima	6	6

==== Section 2 ====
First round
4	(Czech Republic) Jonáš Forejtek	6	6
WC	(United States) Zachary Svajda	3	3
(Spain) Pablo Llamas Ruiz	3	1
(Italy) Luca Nardi	6	6
(United States) Govind Nanda	7	6
(Ukraine) Eric Vanshelboim	5	2
Q	(France) Giovanni Mpetshi Perricard	3	6^{1}
16	(Hungary) Péter Makk	6	7^{7}
9	(Belgium) Gauthier Onclin	6	6^{7}	7
(Canada) Taha Baadi	1	7^{9}	5
Q	(Brazil) Natan Rodrigues	4	4
WC	(United States) William Grant	6	6
Q	(Germany) Milan Welte	6	6
Q	(Latvia) Kārlis Ozoliņš	4	1
(Uzbekistan) Olimjon Nabiev	3	1
6	(United States) Toby Kodat	6	6

Second round
4	(Czech Republic) J Forejtek	6	6
(Italy) L Nardi	3	2
(United States) G Nanda	6^{2}	4
16	(Hungary) P Makk	7^{7}	6
9	(Belgium) G Onclin	6	6
WC	(United States) W Grant	2	3
Q	(Germany) M Welte	6	7^{7}
6	(United States) T Kodat	2	6^{4}

Third round
4	(Czech Republic) J Forejtek	6	3	6
16	(Hungary) P Makk	1	6	2
9	(Belgium) G Onclin	3	4
Q	(Germany) M Welte	6	6

Quarterfinals
4	(Czech Republic) J Forejtek	3	7	7
Q	(Germany) M Welte	6	5	5

=== Bottom half ===
==== Section 3 ====
First round
8/WC	(United States) Emilio Nava	6	3	7^{8}
(Spain) Nicolás Álvarez Varona	2	6	6^{6}
(Italy) Matteo Arnaldi	6	6
(United States) Eliot Spizzirri	3	1
(Argentina) Juan Bautista Torres	6	6
(Sweden) Kevin Chahoud	2	2
Q	(United States) Aidan Mayo	6	7
12	(Japan) Shunsuke Mitsui	4	5
15	(Czech Republic) Jiří Lehečka	7	6
WC	(United States) Ronald Hohmann	5	1
(Serbia) Hamad Međedović	4	0
(Belarus) Alexander Zgirovsky	6	6
(Italy) Samuel Vincent Ruggeri	2	3
(Australia) Rinky Hijikata	6	6
(Netherlands) Stijn Pel	1	6^{4}
3	(United States) Martin Damm	6	7^{7}

Second round
8/WC	(United States) E Nava	6^{4}	7	7
(Italy) M Arnaldi	7^{7}	5	5
(Argentina) JB Torres	4	6	2
Q	(United States) A Mayo	6	2	6
15	(Czech Republic) J Lehečka	6	6
(Belarus) A Zgirovsky	3	2
(Australia) R Hijikata	6	6
3	(United States) M Damm	4	4

Third round
8/WC	(United States) E Nava	7^{7}	6
Q	(United States) A Mayo	6^{3}	2
15	(Czech Republic) J Lehečka	6	6
(Australia) R Hijikata	4	3

Quarterfinals
8/WC	(United States) E Nava	6	6
15	(Czech Republic) J Lehečka	3	1

==== Section 4 ====
First round
5	(Argentina) Thiago Agustín Tirante	4	6	6
WC	(United States) Ronan Jachuck	6	2	3
(United States) Cannon Kingsley	6^{5}	7^{7}	6
(Poland) Wojciech Marek	7^{7}	6^{4}	4
WC	(United States) Dali Blanch	6	5	3
(United Kingdom) Arthur Fery	4	7	6
(Romania) Nini Gabriel Dica	3	2
10	(Canada) Liam Draxl	6	6
13	(Japan) Keisuke Saitoh	1	1
(Czech Republic) Dalibor Svrčina	6	6
WC	(United States) Alexander Bernard	1	4
(France) Arthur Cazaux	6	6
(Switzerland) Dominic Stricker	7^{7}	6
(Brazil) Matheus Pucinelli de Almeida	6^{4}	4
Q	(United States) Cash Hanzlik	2	7	6^{5}
2	(Denmark) Holger Vitus Nødskov Rune	6	5	7^{7}

Second round
5	(Argentina) TA Tirante	6^{6}	0^{r}
(United States) C Kingsley	7^{8}	2
(United Kingdom) A Fery	6^{5}	1
10	(Canada) L Draxl	7^{7}	6
(Czech Republic) D Svrčina	6	7^{7}
(France) A Cazaux	1	6^{4}
(Switzerland) D Stricker	6	7
2	(Denmark) HVN Rune	4	5

Third round
(United States) C Kingsley	7^{9}	7^{8}
10	(Canada) L Draxl	6^{7}	6^{6}
(Czech Republic) D Svrčina	6	3	3
(Switzerland) D Stricker	3	6	6

Quarterfinals
(United States) C Kingsley	7^{7}	6
(Switzerland) D Stricker	6^{3}	4

== Qualifying ==
=== Seeds ===
1. (Latvia) Kārlis Ozoliņš (qualified)
2. (United Kingdom) Harry Wendelken (first round)
3. (Czech Republic) Andrew Paulson (qualified)
4. (Argentina) Román Andrés Burruchaga (Qualifying competition)
5. (Japan) Ryuhei Azuma (qualifying competition)
6. (France) Timo Legout (first round)
7. (Japan) Taiyo Yamanaka (qualifying competition)
8. (United Kingdom) Blu Baker (qualifying competition)
9. (Philippines) Arthur Craig Pantino (first round)
10. (Italy) Lorenzo Rottoli (qualifying competition)
11. (Brazil) Natan Rodrigues (qualified)
12. (Australia) Chen Dong (qualifying competition)
13. (France) Baptiste Anselmo (first round)
14. (Netherlands) Lodewijk Weststrate (first round)
15. (Australia) Stefan Storch (qualifying competition)
16. (France) Giovanni Mpetshi Perricard (qualified)

=== Qualifiers ===
1. (Latvia) Kārlis Ozoliņš
2. (United States) Aidan Mayo
3. (Czech Republic) Andrew Paulson
4. (United States) Cash Hanzlik
5. (France) Giovanni Mpetshi Perricard
6. (Brazil) Natan Rodrigues
7. (Germany) Milan Welte
8. (United States) Blaise Bicknell

=== Draw ===
==== First qualifier ====
First round
1	(Latvia) Kārlis Ozoliņš	7	6
WC	(United States) Micah Braswell	5	3
(India) Mann Shah	3	6	4
10	(Italy) Lorenzo Rottoli	6	3	6

Qualifying competition
1	(Latvia) Kārlis Ozoliņš	6	6
10	(Italy) Lorenzo Rottoli	2	3

==== Second qualifier ====
First round
2	(United Kingdom) Harry Wendelken	6^{4}	6	3
WC	(United States) Aidan Mayo	7^{7}	0	6
(France) Loris Pourroy	5	2
15	(Australia) Stefan Storch	7	6

Qualifying competition
WC	(United States) Aidan Mayo	1	7^{7}	6
15	(Australia) Stefan Storch	6	6^{2}	3

==== Third qualifier ====
First round
3	(Czech Republic) Andrew Paulson	6	6
(United States) Mark Mandlik	4	0
(Brazil) Bruno Oliveira	2	4
12	(Australia) Chen Dong	6	6

Qualifying competition
3	(Czech Republic) Andrew Paulson	6	7^{7}
12	(Australia) Chen Dong	4	6^{4}

==== Fourth qualifier ====
First round
4	(Argentina) Román Andrés Burruchaga	6	6
WC	(Japan) Taisei Kageyama	2	2
WC	(United States) Cash Hanzlik	6	7^{7}
13	(France) Baptiste Anselmo	2	6^{4}

Qualifying competition
4	(Argentina) Román Andrés Burruchaga	2	1
WC	(United States) Cash Hanzlik	6	6

==== Fifth qualifier ====
First round
5	(Japan) Ryuhei Azuma	6	7
(United States) Andrew Dale	4	6^{0}
Alt	(United Kingdom) James Story	3	2
16	(France) Giovanni Mpetshi Perricard	6	6

Qualifying competition
5	(Japan) Ryuhei Azuma	6	5	4
16	(France) Giovanni Mpetshi Perricard	2	7	6

==== Sixth qualifier ====
First round
6	(France) Timo Legout	5	6^{5}
WC	(United States) Victor Lilov	7	7^{7}
WC	(United States) Bruno Kuzuhara	4	3
11	(Brazil) Natan Rodrigues	6	6

Qualifying competition
WC	(United States) Victor Lilov	3	2
11	(Brazil) Natan Rodrigues	6	6

==== Seventh qualifier ====
First round
7	(Japan) Taiyo Yamanaka	0	6	7^{9}
(United States) Andres Martin	6	4	6^{7}
(Germany) Milan Welte	6	6
9	(Philippines) Arthur Craig Pantino	4	3

Qualifying competition
7	(Japan) Taiyo Yamanaka	4	5
(Germany) Milan Welte	6	7

==== Eighth qualifier ====
First round
8	(United Kingdom) Blu Baker	6	6
(Italy) Luciano Darderi	2	1
(United States) Blaise Bicknell	6	7^{7}
14	(Netherlands) Lodewijk Weststrate	1	6^{2}

Qualifying competition
8	(United Kingdom) Blu Baker	4	5
(United States) Blaise Bicknell	6	7
