= 2019 US Open – Wheelchair women's doubles =

Wheelchair women's doubles
- 2019 US Open

Final
- Champions: (Netherlands) Diede de Groot (Netherlands) Aniek van Koot
- Runners-up: (Germany) Sabine Ellerbrock (South Africa) Kgothatso Montjane
- Score: 6–2, 6–0

Events
Singles	men	women		boys	girls
Doubles	men	women	mixed	boys	girls
WC Singles	men	women	quad
WC Doubles	men	women	quad
Legends	men	women	mixed
← 2018 ·	US Open	· 2020 →

Two-time defending champion Diede de Groot and her partner Aniek van Koot defeated Sabine Ellerbrock and Kgothatso Montjane in the final, 6–2, 6–0 to win the women's doubles wheelchair tennis title at the 2019 US Open. With the win, they completed the Grand Slam, and van Koot completed the triple career Grand Slam.

De Groot and Yui Kamiji were the defending champions, but did not compete together. Kamiji partnered Giulia Capocci, but was defeated in the semifinals by de Groot and van Koot.

== Seeds ==
1. (Netherlands) Diede de Groot / (Netherlands) Aniek van Koot (champions)
2. (Netherlands) Marjolein Buis / (United States) Dana Mathewson (semifinals)

== Draw ==
=== Key ===
- Q = Qualifier
- WC = Wild card
- LL = Lucky loser
- Alt = Alternate
- ITF = ITF entry
- PR = Protected ranking
- SR = Special ranking
- SE = Special exempt
- JE = Junior exempt
- JR = Junior Accelerator Programme entrant
- CO = College Accelerator Programme entrant
- NG = Next Gen Accelerator Program entrant
- w/o = Walkover
- r = Retired
- d = Defaulted

=== Bracket ===
Semifinals
1	(Netherlands) Diede de Groot (Netherlands) Aniek van Koot	6	7
(Italy) Giulia Capocci (Japan) Yui Kamiji	2	5
(Germany) Sabine Ellerbrock (South Africa) Kgothatso Montjane	6	4	[10]
2	(Netherlands) Marjolein Buis (United States) Dana Mathewson	1	6	[6]

Final
1	(Netherlands) Diede de Groot (Netherlands) Aniek van Koot	6	6
(Germany) Sabine Ellerbrock (South Africa) Kgothatso Montjane	2	0
