= 2019 US Open – Wheelchair women's singles =

Wheelchair women's singles
- 2019 US Open

Final
- Champion: (Netherlands) Diede de Groot
- Runner-up: (Japan) Yui Kamiji
- Score: 4–6, 6–1, 6–4

Events
Singles	men	women		boys	girls
Doubles	men	women	mixed	boys	girls
WC Singles	men	women	quad
WC Doubles	men	women	quad
Legends	men	women	mixed
← 2018 ·	US Open	· 2020 →

Defending champion Diede de Groot defeated Yui Kamiji in the final, 4–6, 6–1, 6–4 to win the women's singles wheelchair tennis title at the 2019 US Open.

== Seeds ==
1. (Netherlands) Diede de Groot (champion)
2. (Japan) Yui Kamiji (final)

== Draw ==
=== Key ===
- Q = Qualifier
- WC = Wild card
- LL = Lucky loser
- Alt = Alternate
- ITF = ITF entry
- PR = Protected ranking
- SR = Special ranking
- SE = Special exempt
- JE = Junior exempt
- JR = Junior Accelerator Programme entrant
- CO = College Accelerator Programme entrant
- NG = Next Gen Accelerator Program entrant
- w/o = Walkover
- r = Retired
- d = Defaulted

=== Finals ===
Quarterfinals
1	(Netherlands) Diede de Groot	6	6
(Germany) Sabine Ellerbrock	1	0
(South Africa) Kgothatso Montjane	3	6	1
WC	(United States) Dana Mathewson	6	0	6
(Netherlands) Marjolein Buis	6	6
(Italy) Giulia Capocci	1	4
(Netherlands) Aniek van Koot	1	3
2	(Japan) Yui Kamiji	6	6

Semifinals
1	(Netherlands) Diede de Groot	6	6
WC	(United States) Dana Mathewson	3	2
(Netherlands) Marjolein Buis	1	3
2	(Japan) Yui Kamiji	6	6

Final
1	(Netherlands) Diede de Groot	4	6	6
2	(Japan) Yui Kamiji	6	1	4
