= Alexa Noel =

American tennis player (born 2002)

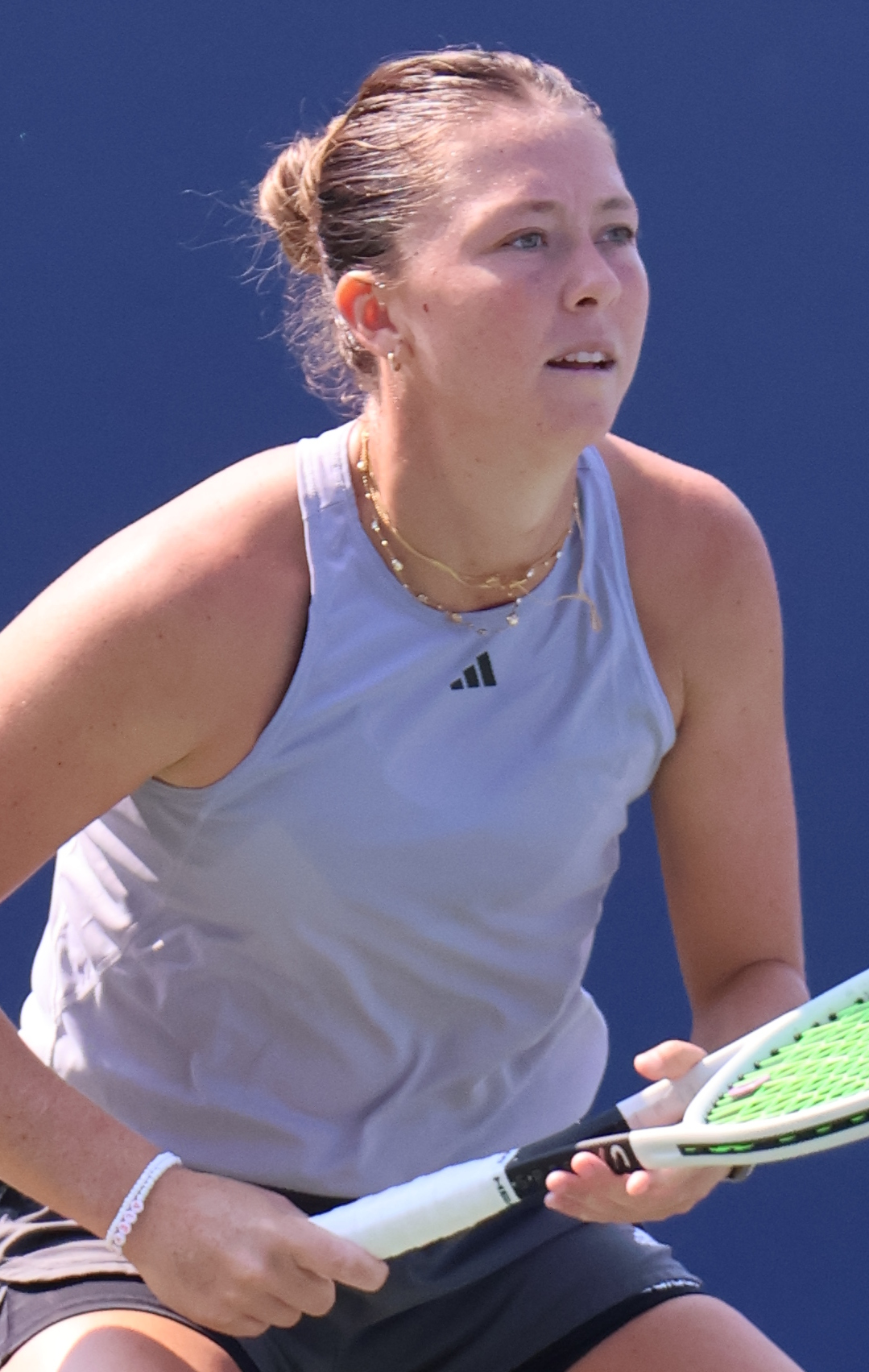
- Noel at the 2024 US Open
- Country (sports): United States
- Born: September 6, 2002 (age 23) Scottsdale, Arizona
- Height: 5 ft 6 in (1.68 m)
- Plays: Right-handed (two-handed backhand)
- Prize money: $122,603

Singles
- Career record: 34–27
- Career titles: 1 ITF
- Highest ranking: No. 679 (June 17, 2024)
- Current ranking: No. 878 (November 25, 2024)

Grand Slam singles results
- US Open: 1R (2024)

Doubles
- Career record: 7–8
- Career titles: 0
- Highest ranking: No. 946 (February 10, 2020)

Grand Slam doubles results
- US Open: 1R (2019)
- Last updated on: November 26, 2024.

Alexa Noel (born September 6, 2002) is an American tennis player. She has reached a career-high singles ranking by the WTA of world No. 679 and a doubles ranking of No. 948. She won the 2024 NCAA singles championship playing for the Miami Hurricanes. She also reached an ITF Junior world ranking of No. 4.

== Professional career ==
Noel made it into the final of the 2019 Wimbledon girl's championship, before falling to Daria Snigur. On August 11, 2019, Noel and her partner, Abigail Forbes won the USTA Girls 18s National Championships doubles title, earning the pair a wildcard entry into the doubles main draw of the 2019 US Open. She won her first professional tournament on January 26, 2020, at the ITF Cancún.

She made her Grand Slam tournament singles debut at the 2024 US Open after receiving a wildcard for the main draw, earning her spot as the current NCAA singles champion. Noel lost in the first round to Sara Sorribes Tormo.

== College career ==
In 2020 Noel enrolled at the University of Iowa. She compiled a 25–3 record there as the #1 singles player. She transferred to the University of Miami Hurricanes in 2022. Noel won the NCAA women's singles title on May 25, 2024.

== ITF Circuit finals ==
=== Singles: 1 (title) ===
Legend
$15,000 tournaments

Result	W–L	Date	Tournament	Tier	Surface	Opponent	Score
Win	1–0	Jan 2020	ITF Cancún, Mexico	15,000	Hard	(Russia) Nika Kukharchuk	6–3, 6–2

== Junior Grand Slam tournament finals ==
=== Singles: 1 (runner-up) ===
Result	Year	Tournament	Surface	Opponent	Score
Loss	2019	Wimbledon	Grass	(Ukraine) Daria Snigur	4–6, 4–6
