= 2019 US Open – Men's doubles =

Men's doubles
- 2019 US Open

Final
- Champions: (Colombia) Juan Sebastián Cabal (Colombia) Robert Farah
- Runners-up: (Spain) Marcel Granollers (Argentina) Horacio Zeballos
- Score: 6–4, 7–5

Details
- Draw: 64
- Seeds: 16

Events
Singles	men	women		boys	girls
Doubles	men	women	mixed	boys	girls
WC Singles	men	women	quad
WC Doubles	men	women	quad
Legends	men	women	mixed
- US Open

Juan Sebastián Cabal and Robert Farah won their second consecutive Grand Slam men's doubles title, defeating Marcel Granollers and Horacio Zeballos in the final, 6–4, 7–5 to win the men's doubles tennis title at the 2019 US Open. Cabal and Farah retained the ATP no. 1 doubles ranking. Mike Bryan, Łukasz Kubot and Nicolas Mahut were also in contention for the top ranking at the start of the tournament.

Mike Bryan and Jack Sock were the defending champions, but chose not to participate together. Bryan played alongside his brother Bob, but lost in the third round to Sock and Jackson Withrow. Sock lost in the quarterfinals to Jamie Murray and Neal Skupski.

Martin Damm Jr. (age 15) and fellow American Toby Kodat (age 16) became the youngest men's doubles team to win a US Open match in the Open Era.

This tournament marked the final major appearance of former doubles world No. 1 and eight-time men's doubles major champion Leander Paes. Partnering Guillermo Durán, he was defeated in the first round.

== Seeds ==
1. (Colombia) Juan Sebastián Cabal / (Colombia) Robert Farah (champions)
2. (Poland) Łukasz Kubot / (Brazil) Marcelo Melo (third round)
3. (South Africa) Raven Klaasen / (New Zealand) Michael Venus (second round)
4. (France) Pierre-Hugues Herbert / (France) Nicolas Mahut (first round)
5. (Netherlands) Jean-Julien Rojer / (Romania) Horia Tecău (first round)
6. (Croatia) Mate Pavić / (Brazil) Bruno Soares (second round)
7. (United States) Bob Bryan / (United States) Mike Bryan (third round)
8. (Spain) Marcel Granollers / (Argentina) Horacio Zeballos (final)

9. (Croatia) Nikola Mektić / (Croatia) Franko Škugor (second round)
10. (United States) Rajeev Ram / (United Kingdom) Joe Salisbury (third round)
11. (Croatia) Ivan Dodig / (Slovakia) Filip Polášek (first round)
12. (Germany) Kevin Krawietz / (Germany) Andreas Mies (semifinals)
13. (Netherlands) Robin Haase / (Netherlands) Wesley Koolhof (third round)
14. (Finland) Henri Kontinen / (Australia) John Peers (second round)
15. (United Kingdom) Jamie Murray / (United Kingdom) Neal Skupski (semifinals)
16. (Austria) Oliver Marach / (Austria) Jürgen Melzer (quarterfinals)

Click on the seed number of a player to go to their draw section.

== Draw ==
Key

- Q = Qualifier
- WC = Wild card
- LL = Lucky loser
- Alt = Alternate
- ITF = ITF entry
- PR = Protected ranking
- SR = Special ranking
- SE = Special exempt
- JE = Junior exempt
- JR = Junior Accelerator Programme entrant
- CO = College Accelerator Programme entrant
- NG = Next Gen Accelerator Program entrant
- w/o = Walkover
- r = Retired
- d = Defaulted

=== Finals ===
Quarterfinals
1	(Colombia) Juan Sebastián Cabal (Colombia) Robert Farah	6	6
(United Kingdom) Luke Bambridge (Japan) Ben McLachlan	4	4
15	(United Kingdom) Jamie Murray (United Kingdom) Neal Skupski	4	6	7^{7}
(United States) Jack Sock (United States) Jackson Withrow	6	1	6^{4}
8	(Spain) Marcel Granollers (Argentina) Horacio Zeballos	7^{7}	6
16	(Austria) Oliver Marach (Austria) Jürgen Melzer	6^{4}	4
12	(Germany) Kevin Krawietz (Germany) Andreas Mies	7^{7}	6
(Argentina) Leonardo Mayer (Portugal) João Sousa	6^{4}	4

Semifinals
1	(Colombia) Juan Sebastián Cabal (Colombia) Robert Farah	7^{7}	7^{10}
15	(United Kingdom) Jamie Murray (United Kingdom) Neal Skupski	6^{5}	6^{8}
8	(Spain) Marcel Granollers (Argentina) Horacio Zeballos	7^{7}	7^{7}
12	(Germany) Kevin Krawietz (Germany) Andreas Mies	6^{2}	6^{5}

Final
1	(Colombia) Juan Sebastián Cabal (Colombia) Robert Farah	6	7
8	(Spain) Marcel Granollers (Argentina) Horacio Zeballos	4	5

=== Top half ===
==== Section 1 ====
First round
1	(Colombia) JS Cabal (Colombia) R Farah	6	6
(Uruguay) P Cuevas (United States) S Johnson	2	3
(United Kingdom) D Evans (United Kingdom) C Norrie	6	1	6
(Germany) T Pütz (Germany) J-L Struff	3	6	1
(Spain) P Carreño Busta (Spain) F López	6	7^{7}
(Chinese Taipei) C-p Hsieh (Indonesia) C Rungkat	2	6^{2}
(Czech Republic) R Jebavý (Netherlands) M Middelkoop	4	4
13	(Netherlands) R Haase (Netherlands) W Koolhof	6	6
9	(Croatia) N Mektić (Croatia) F Škugor	5	6	6
(Australia) J-P Smith (Australia) J Thompson	7	3	4
(United Kingdom) L Bambridge (Japan) B McLachlan	4	6	7^{7}
WC	(United States) T-S Kwiatkowski (United States) N Rubin	6	1	6^{4}
WC	(United States) N Monroe (United States) T Sandgren	5	6	3
(Moldova) R Albot (Tunisia) M Jaziri	7	3	6
(France) J Chardy (France) F Martin	7^{7}	6
5	(Netherlands) J-J Rojer (Romania) H Tecău	6^{2}	1

Second round
1	(Colombia) JS Cabal (Colombia) R Farah	5	6	6
(United Kingdom) D Evans (United Kingdom) C Norrie	7	4	3
(Spain) P Carreño Busta (Spain) F López	6^{7}	3
13	(Netherlands) R Haase (Netherlands) W Koolhof	7^{9}	6
9	(Croatia) N Mektić (Croatia) F Škugor	3	7^{7}	3
(United Kingdom) L Bambridge (Japan) B McLachlan	6	6^{4}	6
(Moldova) R Albot (Tunisia) M Jaziri	4	2
(France) J Chardy (France) F Martin	6	6

Third round
1	(Colombia) JS Cabal (Colombia) R Farah	6	6
13	(Netherlands) R Haase (Netherlands) W Koolhof	4	4
(United Kingdom) L Bambridge (Japan) B McLachlan	6	7^{7}
(France) J Chardy (France) F Martin	3	6^{4}

Quarterfinals
1	(Colombia) JS Cabal (Colombia) R Farah	6	6
(United Kingdom) L Bambridge (Japan) B McLachlan	4	4

==== Section 2 ====
First round
4	(France) P-H Herbert (France) N Mahut	3	1
(India) R Bopanna (Canada) D Shapovalov	6	6
(Italy) M Cecchinato (Italy) A Seppi	6	7^{7}
(Spain) P Andújar (Spain) F Verdasco	3	6^{1}
(Lithuania) R Berankis (Argentina) JI Londero	6	3	6
WC	(United States) M Cressy (United States) K Smith	4	6	3
WC	(United States) R Galloway (United States) N Lammons	3	2
15	(United Kingdom) J Murray (United Kingdom) N Skupski	6	6
11	(Croatia) I Dodig (Slovakia) F Polášek	4	6^{2}
(United States) J Sock (United States) J Withrow	6	7^{7}
(United States) A Krajicek (France) É Roger-Vasselin	7^{7}	5	6
PR	(Serbia) L Đere (Serbia) J Tipsarević	6^{3}	7	2
(Monaco) H Nys (India) D Sharan	4	4
(Spain) R Carballés Baena (Argentina) F Delbonis	6	6
PR	(Poland) H Hurkacz (Canada) V Pospisil	3	6^{4}
7	(United States) B Bryan (United States) M Bryan	6	7^{7}

Second round
(India) R Bopanna (Canada) D Shapovalov	w/o
(Italy) M Cecchinato (Italy) A Seppi
(Lithuania) R Berankis (Argentina) JI Londero	3	4
15	(United Kingdom) J Murray (United Kingdom) N Skupski	6	6
(United States) J Sock (United States) J Withrow	7^{7}	2	6
(United States) A Krajicek (France) É Roger-Vasselin	6^{4}	6	3
(Spain) R Carballés Baena (Argentina) F Delbonis	6	5	3
7	(United States) B Bryan (United States) M Bryan	4	7	6

Third round
(India) R Bopanna (Canada) D Shapovalov	3	4
15	(United Kingdom) J Murray (United Kingdom) N Skupski	6	6
(United States) J Sock (United States) J Withrow	6	7
7	(United States) B Bryan (United States) M Bryan	4	5

Quarterfinals
15	(United Kingdom) J Murray (United Kingdom) N Skupski	4	6	7^{7}
(United States) J Sock (United States) J Withrow	6	1	6^{4}

=== Bottom half ===
==== Section 3 ====
First round
8	(Spain) M Granollers (Argentina) H Zeballos	7^{7}	7
(Belgium) S Gillé (Belgium) J Vliegen	6^{2}	5
(Kazakhstan) A Bublik (Australia) J Millman	3	7^{7}	6^{2}
WC	(United States) E King (United States) H Reese	6	6^{5}	7^{7}
(Argentina) G Pella (Argentina) D Schwartzman	4	2^{r}
(Australia) A de Minaur (Australia) M Reid	6	1
(United States) R Harrison (United States) S Querrey	4	2
10	(United States) R Ram (United Kingdom) J Salisbury	6	6
16	(Austria) O Marach (Austria) J Melzer	6^{4}	6	6
(Kazakhstan) M Kukushkin (Russia) A Rublev	7^{7}	4	4
(New Zealand) M Daniell (United Kingdom) K Skupski	7^{7}	5	6^{1}
(Romania) M Copil (Australia) N Kyrgios	6^{5}	7	7^{7}
(Argentina) G Durán (India) L Paes	5	2
(Serbia) M Kecmanović (Norway) C Ruud	7	6
(France) A Mannarino (France) G Simon	2	1
3	(South Africa) R Klaasen (New Zealand) M Venus	6	6

Second round
8	(Spain) M Granollers (Argentina) H Zeballos	6	6
WC	(United States) E King (United States) H Reese	4	2
(Australia) A de Minaur (Australia) M Reid	4	5
10	(United States) R Ram (United Kingdom) J Salisbury	6	7
16	(Austria) O Marach (Austria) J Melzer	w/o
(Romania) M Copil (Australia) N Kyrgios
(Serbia) M Kecmanović (Norway) C Ruud	6	0	6
3	(South Africa) R Klaasen (New Zealand) M Venus	4	6	4

Third round
8	(Spain) M Granollers (Argentina) H Zeballos	6	5	7^{7}
10	(United States) R Ram (United Kingdom) J Salisbury	3	7	6^{2}
16	(Austria) O Marach (Austria) J Melzer	6	6
(Serbia) M Kecmanović (Norway) C Ruud	0	3

Quarterfinals
8	(Spain) M Granollers (Argentina) H Zeballos	7^{7}	6
16	(Austria) O Marach (Austria) J Melzer	6^{4}	4

==== Section 4 ====
First round
6	(Croatia) M Pavić (Brazil) B Soares	3	7	6
(Chile) C Garín (Chile) N Jarry	6	5	0
(El Salvador) M Arévalo (United Kingdom) J O'Mara	4	6	6
(France) B Paire (Germany) M Zverev	6	4	1
WC	(United States) M Krueger (United States) T Smyczek	6^{6}	5
WC	(United States) M Damm (United States) T Kodat	7^{8}	7
(Brazil) M Demoliner (United Kingdom) D Inglot	4	5
12	(Germany) K Krawietz (Germany) A Mies	6	7
14	(Finland) H Kontinen (Australia) J Peers	5	7^{7}	6
(Mexico) S González (Pakistan) A-u-H Qureshi	7	6^{4}	3
(Argentina) A Molteni (Slovakia) I Zelenay	2	4
(Argentina) L Mayer (Portugal) J Sousa	6	6
PR	(Slovakia) J Kovalík (Spain) A Ramos Viñolas	3	6	7^{7}
(Sweden) R Lindstedt (Austria) P Oswald	6	4	6^{5}
(Ukraine) D Molchanov (New Zealand) A Sitak	2	4
2	(Poland) Ł Kubot (Brazil) M Melo	6	6

Second round
6	(Croatia) M Pavić (Brazil) B Soares	6^{5}	4
(El Salvador) M Arévalo (United Kingdom) J O'Mara	7^{7}	6
WC	(United States) M Damm (United States) T Kodat	2	5
12	(Germany) K Krawietz (Germany) A Mies	6	7
14	(Finland) H Kontinen (Australia) J Peers	6	3	6^{4}
(Argentina) L Mayer (Portugal) J Sousa	3	6	7^{7}
PR	(Slovakia) J Kovalík (Spain) A Ramos Viñolas	3	4
2	(Poland) Ł Kubot (Brazil) M Melo	6	6

Third round
(El Salvador) M Arévalo (United Kingdom) J O'Mara	6	3	4
12	(Germany) K Krawietz (Germany) A Mies	3	6	6
(Argentina) L Mayer (Portugal) J Sousa	7^{7}	6
2	(Poland) Ł Kubot (Brazil) M Melo	6^{2}	3

Quarterfinals
12	(Germany) K Krawietz (Germany) A Mies	7^{7}	6
(Argentina) L Mayer (Portugal) J Sousa	6^{4}	4
