= 2019 US Open – Mixed doubles =

Mixed doubles
- 2019 US Open

Final
- Champions: (United States) Bethanie Mattek-Sands (United Kingdom) Jamie Murray
- Runners-up: (Chinese Taipei) Chan Hao-ching (New Zealand) Michael Venus
- Score: 6–2, 6–3

Details
- Draw: 32
- Seeds: 8

Events
Singles	men	women		boys	girls
Doubles	men	women	mixed	boys	girls
WC Singles	men	women	quad
WC Doubles	men	women	quad
Legends	men	women	mixed
- US Open

Bethanie Mattek-Sands and Jamie Murray were the defending champions and successfully defended their title, defeating Chan Hao-ching and Michael Venus in the final, 6–2, 6–3. This is the third straight Mixed Doubles title Murray has won at the US Open, following his championships in 2018 (with Mattek-Sands) and 2017 (with Martina Hingis).

== Seeds ==
1. (Chinese Taipei) Chan Hao-ching / (New Zealand) Michael Venus (final)
2. (Canada) Gabriela Dabrowski / (Croatia) Mate Pavić (quarterfinals)
3. (Australia) Samantha Stosur / (United States) Rajeev Ram (semifinals)
4. (Chinese Taipei) Latisha Chan / (Croatia) Ivan Dodig (semifinals)
5. (United States) Nicole Melichar / (Brazil) Bruno Soares (second round)
6. (Netherlands) Demi Schuurs / (Finland) Henri Kontinen (quarterfinals)
7. (Germany) Anna-Lena Grönefeld / (Austria) Oliver Marach (first round)
8. (Czech Republic) Květa Peschke / (Netherlands) Wesley Koolhof (quarterfinals)

== Draw ==
Key

- Q = Qualifier
- WC = Wild card
- LL = Lucky loser
- Alt = Alternate
- ITF = ITF entry
- PR = Protected ranking
- SR = Special ranking
- SE = Special exempt
- JE = Junior exempt
- JR = Junior Accelerator Programme entrant
- CO = College Accelerator Programme entrant
- NG = Next Gen Accelerator Program entrant
- w/o = Walkover
- r = Retired
- d = Defaulted

=== Finals ===
Semifinals
1	(Chinese Taipei) Chan Hao-ching (New Zealand) Michael Venus	7^{7}	7
4	(Chinese Taipei) Latisha Chan (Croatia) Ivan Dodig	6^{3}	5
3	(Australia) Samantha Stosur (United States) Rajeev Ram	3	1
WC	(United States) Bethanie Mattek-Sands (United Kingdom) Jamie Murray	6	6

Final
1	(Chinese Taipei) Chan Hao-ching (New Zealand) Michael Venus	2	3
WC	(United States) Bethanie Mattek-Sands (United Kingdom) Jamie Murray	6	6

=== Top half ===
First round
1	(Chinese Taipei) H-c Chan (New Zealand) M Venus	7^{7}	7^{7}
(Slovenia) A Klepač (United Kingdom) K Skupski	6^{4}	6^{5}
(United States) D Krawczyk (United Kingdom) J Salisbury	6	6
WC	(United States) H Baptiste (United States) J Brooksby	2	2
(China) Y Duan (Brazil) M Demoliner	7^{9}	6
(Germany) L Siegemund (Germany) A Mies	6^{7}	4
WC	(United States) C McHale (United States) R Harrison	4	6	[11]
8	(Czech Republic) K Peschke (Netherlands) W Koolhof	6	3	[13]
4	(Chinese Taipei) L Chan (Croatia) I Dodig	6	6
(Spain) MJ Martínez Sánchez (United Kingdom) N Skupski	4	3
(Czech Republic) L Hradecká (New Zealand) A Sitak	4	5
(Romania) R Olaru (Croatia) F Škugor	6	7
(Poland) A Rosolska (Croatia) N Mektić	3	2
(United States) A Spears (India) R Bopanna	6	6
(United States) R Atawo (France) F Martin	2	6	[10]
7	(Germany) A-L Grönefeld (Austria) O Marach	6	4	[8]

Second round
1	(Chinese Taipei) H-c Chan (New Zealand) M Venus	6	6
(United States) D Krawczyk (United Kingdom) J Salisbury	4	3
(China) Y Duan (Brazil) M Demoliner	5	6	[7]
8	(Czech Republic) K Peschke (Netherlands) W Koolhof	7	4	[10]
4	(Chinese Taipei) L Chan (Croatia) I Dodig	6	6
(Romania) R Olaru (Croatia) F Škugor	1	1
(United States) A Spears (India) R Bopanna	5	6^{4}
(United States) R Atawo (France) F Martin	7	7^{7}

Quarterfinals
1	(Chinese Taipei) H-c Chan (New Zealand) M Venus	6	7^{7}
8	(Czech Republic) K Peschke (Netherlands) W Koolhof	3	6^{0}
4	(Chinese Taipei) L Chan (Croatia) I Dodig	7^{7}	3	[10]
(United States) R Atawo (France) F Martin	6^{3}	6	[3]

Semifinals
1	(Chinese Taipei) H-c Chan (New Zealand) M Venus	7^{7}	7
4	(Chinese Taipei) L Chan (Croatia) I Dodig	6^{3}	5

=== Bottom half ===
First round
6	(Netherlands) D Schuurs (Finland) H Kontinen	7	6
(United States) A Muhammad (United States) A Krajicek	5	4
WC	(United States) J Brady (United States) D Kudla	7^{11}	6
(China) S Zheng (Belgium) J Vliegen	6^{9}	4
(Belgium) K Flipkens (France) É Roger-Vasselin	6	6
WC	(United States) C Vandeweghe (United States) M Cressy	2	4
WC	(United States) K Christian (United States) J Cerretani	4	5
3	(Australia) S Stosur (United States) R Ram	6	7
5	(United States) N Melichar (Brazil) B Soares	6	6
(Chinese Taipei) S-w Hsieh (Chinese Taipei) C-p Hsieh	1	4
WC	(United States) B Mattek-Sands (United Kingdom) J Murray	6	6^{2}	[10]
(China) S Zhang (Australia) J Peers	4	7^{7}	[7]
WC	(United States) D Collins (United States) N Monroe	2	2
WC	(United States) H Carter (United States) J Withrow	6	6
Alt	(Croatia) D Jurak (New Zealand) M Daniell	2	2
2	(Canada) G Dabrowski (Croatia) M Pavić	6	6

Second round
6	(Netherlands) D Schuurs (Finland) H Kontinen	4	7^{7}	[10]
WC	(United States) J Brady (United States) D Kudla	6	6^{2}	[8]
(Belgium) K Flipkens (France) É Roger-Vasselin	6^{2}	5
3	(Australia) S Stosur (United States) R Ram	7^{7}	7
5	(United States) N Melichar (Brazil) B Soares	3	3
WC	(United States) B Mattek-Sands (United Kingdom) J Murray	6	6
WC	(United States) H Carter (United States) J Withrow	6^{6}	2
2	(Canada) G Dabrowski (Croatia) M Pavić	7^{8}	6

Quarterfinals
6	(Netherlands) D Schuurs (Finland) H Kontinen	6	4	[12]
3	(Australia) S Stosur (United States) R Ram	4	6	[14]
WC	(United States) B Mattek-Sands (United Kingdom) J Murray	2	7	[10]
2	(Canada) G Dabrowski (Croatia) M Pavić	6	5	[4]

Semifinals
3	(Australia) S Stosur (United States) R Ram	3	1
WC	(United States) B Mattek-Sands (United Kingdom) J Murray	6	6
