= 2019 US Open – Wheelchair men's doubles =

Wheelchair men's doubles
- 2019 US Open

Final
- Champions: (United Kingdom) Alfie Hewett (United Kingdom) Gordon Reid
- Runners-up: (Argentina) Gustavo Fernández (Japan) Shingo Kunieda
- Score: 1–6, 6–4, [11–9]

Events
| Singles | men | women | | boys | girls |
| Doubles | men | women | mixed | boys | girls |
| WC Singles | men | women | quad |
| WC Doubles | men | women | quad |
| Legends | men | women | mixed |
| ← 2018 · | US Open | · 2020 → |

Two-time defending champions Alfie Hewett and Gordon Reid defeated Gustavo Fernández and Shingo Kunieda in the final, 1–6, 6–4, [11–9] to win the men's doubles wheelchair tennis title at the 2019 US Open.

== Seeds ==
1. (France) Stéphane Houdet / (France) Nicolas Peifer (semifinals)
2. (Belgium) Joachim Gérard / (Sweden) Stefan Olsson (semifinals)

== Draw ==
=== Key ===
- Q = Qualifier
- WC = Wild card
- LL = Lucky loser
- Alt = Alternate
- ITF = ITF entry
- PR = Protected ranking
- SR = Special ranking
- SE = Special exempt
- JE = Junior exempt
- JR = Junior Accelerator Programme entrant
- CO = College Accelerator Programme entrant
- NG = Next Gen Accelerator Program entrant
- w/o = Walkover
- r = Retired
- d = Defaulted

=== Bracket ===
Semifinals
1 | (France) Stéphane Houdet (France) Nicolas Peifer | 0 | 3
(United Kingdom) Alfie Hewett (United Kingdom) Gordon Reid | 6 | 6
(Argentina) Gustavo Fernández (Japan) Shingo Kunieda | 6 | 5 | [10]
2 | (Belgium) Joachim Gérard (Sweden) Stefan Olsson | 2 | 7 | [3]

Final
(United Kingdom) Alfie Hewett (United Kingdom) Gordon Reid | 1 | 6 | [11]
(Argentina) Gustavo Fernández (Japan) Shingo Kunieda | 6 | 4 | [9]
