= 2019 US Open – Day-by-day summaries =

The 2019 US Open described in detail, in the form of day-by-day summaries.

== Day 1 (August 26) ==
- Seeds out:
  - Men's Singles: (Italy) Fabio Fognini [11], (Argentina) Guido Pella [19], (United States) Taylor Fritz [26]
  - Women's Singles: (Germany) Angelique Kerber [14], (France) Caroline Garcia [27]
- Schedule of Play

Matches on main courts
Matches on Arthur Ashe Stadium
Event	Winner	Loser	Score
Women's Singles 1st Round	(Australia) Ashleigh Barty [2]	(Kazakhstan) Zarina Diyas	1–6, 6–3, 6–2
Men's Singles 1st Round	(Serbia) Novak Djokovic [1]	(Spain) Roberto Carballés Baena	6–4, 6–1, 6–4
2019 US Open Opening Night Ceremony
Women's Singles 1st Round	(United States) Serena Williams [8]	(Russia) Maria Sharapova	6–1, 6–1
Men's Singles 1st Round	(Switzerland) Roger Federer [3]	(India) Sumit Nagal [Q]	4–6, 6–1, 6–2, 6–4
Matches on Louis Armstrong Stadium
Event	Winner	Loser	Score
Women's Singles 1st Round	(Czech Republic) Karolína Plíšková [3]	(Czech Republic) Tereza Martincová [Q]	7–6^{(8–6)}, 7–6^{(7–3)}
Men's Singles 1st Round	(Russia) Daniil Medvedev [5]	(India) Prajnesh Gunneswaran	6–4, 6–1, 6–2
Women's Singles 1st Round	(United States) Venus Williams	(China) Zheng Saisai	6–1, 6–0
Men's Singles 1st Round	(Switzerland) Stan Wawrinka [23]	(Italy) Jannik Sinner [Q]	6–3, 7–6^{(7–4)}, 4–6, 6–3
Women's Singles 1st Round	(United States) Madison Keys [10]	(Japan) Misaki Doi	7–5, 6–0
Matches on Grandstand
Event	Winner	Loser	Score
Men's Singles 1st Round	(Japan) Kei Nishikori [7]	(Argentina) Marco Trungelliti [Q]	6–1, 4–1, retired
Women's Singles 1st Round	(France) Kristina Mladenovic	(Germany) Angelique Kerber [14]	7–5, 0–6, 6–4
Men's Singles 1st Round	(Argentina) Juan Ignacio Londero	(United States) Sam Querrey	3–6, 6–1, 7–6^{(7–3)}, 7–5
Women's Singles 1st Round	(United States) Sofia Kenin [20]	(United States) CoCo Vandeweghe [PR]	7–6^{(7–4)}, 6–3
Colored background indicates a night match
Matches start at 11am, night session starts at 7pm Eastern Daylight Time (EDT)

== Day 2 (August 27) ==
- Seeds out:
  - Men's Singles: (Austria) Dominic Thiem [4], (Greece) Stefanos Tsitsipas [8], (Russia) Karen Khachanov [9], (Spain) Roberto Bautista Agut [10], (Canada) Félix Auger-Aliassime [18], (United Kingdom) Kyle Edmund [30]
  - Women's Singles: (United States) Sloane Stephens [11], (Spain) Garbiñe Muguruza [24], (Spain) Carla Suárez Navarro [28], (Czech Republic) Barbora Strýcová [31]
- Schedule of Play

Matches on main courts
Matches on Arthur Ashe Stadium
Event	Winner	Loser	Score
Women's Singles 1st Round	(Japan) Naomi Osaka [1]	(Russia) Anna Blinkova	6−4, 6−7^{(5−7)}, 6−2
Men's Singles 1st Round	(Italy) Thomas Fabbiano	(Austria) Dominic Thiem [4]	6−4, 3−6, 6−3, 6−2
Men's Singles 1st Round	(Spain) Rafael Nadal [2]	(Australia) John Millman	6–3, 6–2, 6–2
Women's Singles 1st Round	(Russia) Anna Kalinskaya [Q]	(United States) Sloane Stephens [11]	6–3, 6–4
Matches on Louis Armstrong Stadium
Event	Winner	Loser	Score
Men's Singles 1st Round	(Russia) Andrey Rublev	(Greece) Stefanos Tsitsipas [8]	6−4, 6−7^{(5−7)}, 7−6^{(9−7)}, 7−5
Women's Singles 1st Round	(Romania) Simona Halep [4]	(United States) Nicole Gibbs [LL]	6−3, 3−6, 6−2
Women's Singles 1st Round	(United States) Cori Gauff [WC]	(Russia) Anastasia Potapova	3–6, 6–2, 6–4
Women's Singles 1st Round	(Belarus) Aryna Sabalenka [9]	(Belarus) Victoria Azarenka	3–6, 6–3, 6–4
Men's Singles 1st Round	(Australia) Nick Kyrgios [28]	(United States) Steve Johnson	6–3, 7–6^{(7–1)}, 6–4
Matches on Grandstand
Event	Winner	Loser	Score
Women's Singles 1st Round	(United States) Alison Riske	(Spain) Garbiñe Muguruza [24]	2–6, 6–1, 6–3
Men's Singles 1st Round	(United States) John Isner [14]	(Spain) Guillermo García López [Q]	6–3, 6–4, 6–4
Women's Singles 1st Round	(Denmark) Caroline Wozniacki [19]	(China) Wang Yafan	1–6, 7–5, 6–3
Men's Singles 1st Round	(Canada) Denis Shapovalov	(Canada) Félix Auger-Aliassime [18]	6–1, 6–1, 6–4
Colored background indicates a night match
Matches start at 11am, night session starts at 7pm Eastern Daylight Time (EDT)

== Day 3 (August 28) ==
- Seeds out:
  - Men's Singles: (Croatia) Borna Ćorić [12]
- Schedule of Play

Matches on main courts
Matches on Arthur Ashe Stadium
Event	Winner	Loser	Score
Women's Singles 2nd Round	(Czech Republic) Karolína Plíšková [3]	(Georgia (country)) Mariam Bolkvadze [Q]	6–1, 6–4
Men's Singles 2nd Round	(Switzerland) Roger Federer [3]	(Bosnia and Herzegovina) Damir Džumhur	3–6, 6–2, 6–3, 6–4
Men's Singles 2nd Round	(Serbia) Novak Djokovic [1]	(Argentina) Juan Ignacio Londero	6–4, 7–6^{(7–3)}, 6–1
Women's Singles 2nd Round	(United States) Serena Williams [8]	(United States) Caty McNally [WC]	5–7, 6–3, 6–1
Matches on Louis Armstrong Stadium
Event	Winner	Loser	Score
Men's Singles 2nd Round	(Japan) Kei Nishikori [7]	(United States) Bradley Klahn	6–2, 4–6, 6–3, 7–5
Women's Singles 2nd Round	(Ukraine) Elina Svitolina [5]	(United States) Venus Williams	6−4, 6−4
Women's Singles 2nd Round	(United States) Madison Keys [10]	(China) Zhu Lin	6−4, 6−1
Women's Singles 2nd Round	(Australia) Ashleigh Barty [2]	(United States) Lauren Davis	6–2, 7–6^{(7–2)}
Men's Singles 2nd Round	(Germany) Dominik Köpfer [Q]	(United States) Reilly Opelka	6–4, 6–4, 7–6^{(7–2)}
Colored background indicates a night match
Matches start at 11am, night session starts at 7pm Eastern Daylight Time (EDT)

== Day 4 (August 29) ==
- Seeds out:
  - Men's Singles: (France) Lucas Pouille [25], (Serbia) Dušan Lajović [27], (France) Benoît Paire [29], (Chile) Cristian Garín [31], (Spain) Fernando Verdasco [32]
  - Women's Singles: (Romania) Simona Halep [4], (Czech Republic) Petra Kvitová [6], (Belarus) Aryna Sabalenka [9], (Chinese Taipei) Hsieh Su-wei [29]
  - Men's Doubles: (Croatia) Ivan Dodig / (Slovakia) Filip Polášek [11]
  - Mixed Doubles: (Germany) Anna-Lena Grönefeld / (Austria) Oliver Marach [7]
- Schedule of Play

Matches on main courts
Matches on Arthur Ashe Stadium
Event	Winner	Loser	Score
Men's Singles 2nd Round	(Germany) Alexander Zverev [6]	(United States) Frances Tiafoe	6–3, 3–6, 6–2, 2–6, 6–3
Women's Singles 2nd Round	(United States) Taylor Townsend [Q]	(Romania) Simona Halep [4]	2–6, 6–3, 7–6^{(7–4)}
Women's Singles 2nd Round	(Denmark) Caroline Wozniacki [19]	(United States) Danielle Collins	4–6, 6–3, 6–4
Men's Singles 2nd Round	(Croatia) Marin Čilić [22]	(Germany) Cedrik-Marcel Stebe [PR]	4–6, 6–3, 7–5, 6–3
Matches on Louis Armstrong Stadium
Event	Winner	Loser	Score
Women's Singles 2nd Round	(Germany) Andrea Petkovic	(Czech Republic) Petra Kvitová [6]	6–4, 6–4
Women's Singles 2nd Round	(Japan) Naomi Osaka [1]	(Poland) Magda Linette	6–2, 6–4
Men's Singles 2nd Round	(United States) John Isner [14]	(Germany) Jan-Lennard Struff	6–3, 7–6^{(7–4)}, 7–6^{(7–5)}
Women's Singles 2nd Round	(United States) Cori Gauff [WC]	(Hungary) Tímea Babos [Q]	6–2, 4–6, 6–4
Men's Doubles 1st Round	(United States) Jack Sock (United States) Jackson Withrow	(Croatia) Ivan Dodig [11] (Slovakia) Filip Polášek [11]	6−4, 7−6^{(7−2)}
Matches on Grandstand
Event	Winner	Loser	Score
Women's Singles 2nd Round	(United States) Sofia Kenin [20]	(Germany) Laura Siegemund	7–6^{(7–4)}, 6–0
Men's Singles 2nd Round	(Russia) Daniil Medvedev [5]	(Bolivia) Hugo Dellien	6–3, 7–5, 5–7, 6–3
Women's Singles 2nd Round	(Latvia) Jeļena Ostapenko	(United States) Alison Riske	6–4, 6–3
Men's Singles 2nd Round	(Australia) Nick Kyrgios [28]	(France) Antoine Hoang [WC]	6–4, 6–2, 6–4
Colored background indicates a night match
Matches start at 11am, night session starts at 7pm Eastern Daylight Time (EDT)

== Day 5 (August 30) ==
- Seeds out:
  - Men's Singles: (Japan) Kei Nishikori [7], (Georgia (country)) Nikoloz Basilashvili [17]
  - Women's Singles: (Latvia) Anastasija Sevastova [12], (United States) Sofia Kenin [20], (Greece) Maria Sakkari [30], (Ukraine) Dayana Yastremska [32], (China) Zhang Shuai [33]
  - Men's Doubles: (France) Pierre-Hugues Herbert / (France) Nicolas Mahut [4], (Netherlands) Jean-Julien Rojer / (Romania) Horia Tecău [5]
  - Women's Doubles: (Australia) Samantha Stosur / (China) Zhang Shuai [6], (Czech Republic) Lucie Hradecká / (Slovenia) Andreja Klepač [10], (Belgium) Kirsten Flipkens / (Sweden) Johanna Larsson [11], (Croatia) Darija Jurak / (Spain) María José Martínez Sánchez [13], (Russia) Veronika Kudermetova / (Kazakhstan) Galina Voskoboeva [15], (United States) Raquel Atawo / (United States) Asia Muhammad [16]
- Schedule of Play

Matches on main courts
Matches on Arthur Ashe Stadium
Event	Winner	Loser	Score
Men's Singles 3rd Round	(Switzerland) Roger Federer [3]	(United Kingdom) Dan Evans	6–2, 6–2, 6–1
Women's Singles 3rd Round	(United States) Serena Williams [8]	(Czech Republic) Karolína Muchová	6–3, 6–2
Men's Doubles 1st Round	(Romania) Marius Copil (Australia) Nick Kyrgios	(Australia) Marcus Daniell (United Kingdom) Ken Skupski	6−7^{(5−7)}, 7−5, 7−6^{(7−1)}
Women's Singles 3rd Round	(United States) Madison Keys [10]	(United States) Sofia Kenin [20]	6−3, 7−5
Men's Singles 3rd Round	(Serbia) Novak Djokovic [1]	(United States) Denis Kudla	6–3, 6–4, 6–2
Matches on Louis Armstrong Stadium
Event	Winner	Loser	Score
Women's Singles 3rd Round	(Czech Republic) Karolína Plíšková [3]	(Tunisia) Ons Jabeur	6–1, 4–6, 6–4
Women's Singles 3rd Round	(Australia) Ashleigh Barty [2]	(Greece) Maria Sakkari [30]	7–5, 6–3
Men's Singles 3rd Round	(Switzerland) Stan Wawrinka [23]	(Italy) Paolo Lorenzi [LL]	6−4, 7−6^{(11−9)}, 7−6^{(7−4)}
Women's Singles 3rd Round	(Ukraine) Elina Svitolina [5]	(Ukraine) Dayana Yastremska [32]	6−2, 6−0
Men's Singles 3rd Round	(Russia) Daniil Medvedev [5]	(Spain) Feliciano López	7–6^{(7–1)}, 4–6, 7–6^{(9–7)}, 6–4
Matches on Grandstand
Event	Winner	Loser	Score
Men's Singles 3rd Round	(Australia) Alex de Minaur	(Japan) Kei Nishikori [7]	6−2, 6−4, 2−6, 6−3
Women's Singles 3rd Round	(United Kingdom) Johanna Konta [16]	(China) Zhang Shuai [33]	6–2, 6–3
Women's Singles 3rd Round	(China) Wang Qiang [18]	(France) Fiona Ferro	7–6^{(7–1)}, 6–3
Men's Singles 3rd Round	(Germany) Dominik Köpfer [Q]	(Georgia (country)) Nikoloz Basilashvili [17]	6–3, 7–6^{(7–1)}, 4–6, 6–1
Colored background indicates a night match
Matches start at 11am, night session starts at 7pm Eastern Daylight Time (EDT)

== Day 6 (August 31) ==
- Seeds out:
  - Men's Singles: (United States) John Isner [14], (Australia) Nick Kyrgios [28]
  - Women's Singles: (Netherlands) Kiki Bertens [7], (Denmark) Caroline Wozniacki [19], (Estonia) Anett Kontaveit [21]
  - Men's Doubles: (South Africa) Raven Klaasen / (New Zealand) Michael Venus [3], (Croatia) Mate Pavić / (Brazil) Bruno Soares [6], (Croatia) Nikola Mektić / (Croatia) Franko Škugor [9], (Finland) Henri Kontinen / (Australia) John Peers [14]
  - Women's Doubles: (Germany) Anna-Lena Grönefeld / (Netherlands) Demi Schuurs [5]
- Schedule of Play

Matches on main courts
Matches on Arthur Ashe Stadium
Event	Winner	Loser	Score
Women's Singles 3rd Round	(Canada) Bianca Andreescu [15]	(Denmark) Caroline Wozniacki [19]	6–4, 6–4
Men's Singles 3rd Round	(Spain) Rafael Nadal [2]	(South Korea) Chung Hyeon [Q]	6−3, 6−4, 6−2
Women's Singles 3rd Round	(Japan) Naomi Osaka [1]	(United States) Cori Gauff [WC]	6−3, 6−0
Men's Singles 3rd Round	(Russia) Andrey Rublev	(Australia) Nick Kyrgios [28]	7−6^{(7−5)}, 7−6^{(7−5)}, 6−3
Matches on Louis Armstrong Stadium
Event	Winner	Loser	Score
Women's Singles 3rd Round	(United States) Taylor Townsend [Q]	(Romania) Sorana Cîrstea	7–5, 6–2
Women's Singles 3rd Round	(Germany) Julia Görges [26]	(Netherlands) Kiki Bertens [7]	6–2, 6–3
Men's Singles 3rd Round	(Germany) Alexander Zverev [6]	(Slovenia) Aljaž Bedene	6−7^{(4−7)}, 7−6^{(7−4)}, 6−3, 7−6^{(7−3)}
Men's Singles 3rd Round	(France) Gaël Monfils [13]	(Canada) Denis Shapovalov	6−7^{(5−7)}, 7−6^{(7−4)}, 6−4, 6−7^{(6−8)}, 6−3
Men's Doubles 2nd Round	(United States) Bob Bryan [7] (United States) Mike Bryan [7]	(Spain) Roberto Carballés Baena (Argentina) Federico Delbonis	4–6, 7–5, 6–3
Matches on Grandstand
Event	Winner	Loser	Score
Women's Singles 3rd Round	(Belgium) Elise Mertens [25]	(Germany) Andrea Petkovic	6–3, 6–3
Women's Singles 3rd Round	(United States) Kristie Ahn [WC]	(Latvia) Jeļena Ostapenko	6−3, 7−5
Men's Singles 3rd Round	(Croatia) Marin Čilić [22]	(United States) John Isner [14]	5−7, 6−3, 7−6^{(8−6)}, 6−4
Men's Singles 3rd Round	(Argentina) Diego Schwartzman [20]	(United States) Tennys Sandgren	6−4, 6−1, 6−3
Colored background indicates a night match
Matches start at 11am, night session starts at 7pm Eastern Daylight Time (EDT)

== Day 7 (September 1) ==
- Seeds out:
  - Men's Singles: (Serbia) Novak Djokovic [1], (Belgium) David Goffin [15]
  - Women's Singles: (Australia) Ashleigh Barty [2], (Czech Republic) Karolína Plíšková [3], (United States) Madison Keys [10], (Croatia) Petra Martić [22]
  - Men's Doubles: (Poland) Łukasz Kubot / (Brazil) Marcelo Melo [2], (United States) Rajeev Ram / (United Kingdom) Joe Salisbury [10]
  - Women's Doubles: (Chinese Taipei) Chan Hao-ching / (Chinese Taipei) Latisha Chan [7], (United States) Nicole Melichar / (Czech Republic) Květa Peschke [9]
  - Mixed Doubles: (United States) Nicole Melichar / (Brazil) Bruno Soares [5]
- Schedule of Play

Matches on main courts
Matches on Arthur Ashe Stadium
Event	Winner	Loser	Score
Men's Singles 4th Round	(Switzerland) Roger Federer [3]	(Belgium) David Goffin [15]	6−2, 6−2, 6−0
Women's Singles 4th Round	(United States) Serena Williams [8]	(Croatia) Petra Martić [22]	6−3, 6−4
Women's Singles 4th Round	(Ukraine) Elina Svitolina [5]	(United States) Madison Keys [10]	7–5, 6–4
Men's Singles 4th Round	(Switzerland) Stan Wawrinka [23]	(Serbia) Novak Djokovic [1]	6–4, 7–5, 2–1, ret.
Matches on Louis Armstrong Stadium
Event	Winner	Loser	Score
Women's Singles 4th Round	(China) Wang Qiang [18]	(Australia) Ashleigh Barty [2]	6−4, 6−2
Women's Singles 4th Round	(United Kingdom) Johanna Konta [16]	(Czech Republic) Karolína Plíšková [3]	6−7^{(1−7)}, 6−3, 7−5
Women's Doubles 2nd Round	(United States) Cori Gauff [WC] (United States) Caty McNally [WC]	(United States) Nicole Melichar [9] (Czech Republic) Květa Peschke [9]	6−3, 7−6^{(11−9)}
Men's Singles 4th Round	(Russia) Daniil Medvedev [5]	(Germany) Dominik Köpfer [Q]	3−6, 6−3, 6−2, 7−6^{(7−2)}
Matches on Grandstand
Event	Winner	Loser	Score
Women's Doubles 2nd Round	(United States) Caroline Dolehide [PR] (United States) Vania King [PR]	(Chile) Alexa Guarachi (United States) Bernarda Pera	6−3, 7−6^{(7−4)}
Men's Singles 4th Round	(Bulgaria) Grigor Dimitrov	(Australia) Alex de Minaur	7−5, 6−3, 6−4
Women's Doubles 2nd Round	(Russia) Anna Kalinskaya (Kazakhstan) Yulia Putintseva	(China) Peng Shuai (Poland) Alicja Rosolska	6−2, 5−7, 6−3
Men's Doubles 2nd Round	(Spain) Marcel Granollers [8] (Argentina) Horacio Zeballos [8]	(United States) Rajeev Ram [10] (United Kingdom) Joe Salisbury [10]	6−3, 5−7, 7−6^{(7−2)}
Colored background indicates a night match
Matches start at 11am, night session starts at 7pm Eastern Daylight Time (EDT)

== Day 8 (September 2) ==
- Seeds out:
  - Men's Singles: (Germany) Alexander Zverev [6], (Croatia) Marin Čilić [22]
  - Women's Singles: (Japan) Naomi Osaka [1], (Germany) Julia Görges [26]
  - Men's Doubles: (United States) Bob Bryan / (United States) Mike Bryan [7], (Netherlands) Robin Haase / (Netherlands) Wesley Koolhof [13]
  - Women's Doubles: (Chinese Taipei) Hsieh Su-wei / (Czech Republic) Barbora Strýcová [2]
  - Mixed Doubles: (Canada) Gabriela Dabrowski / (Croatia) Mate Pavić [2], (Czech Republic) Květa Peschke / (Netherlands) Wesley Koolhof [8]
- Schedule of Play

Matches on main courts
Matches on Arthur Ashe Stadium
Event	Winner	Loser	Score
Women's Singles 4th Round	(Switzerland) Belinda Bencic [13]	(Japan) Naomi Osaka [1]	7–5, 6–4
Men's Singles 4th Round	(Argentina) Diego Schwartzman [20]	(Germany) Alexander Zverev [6]	3–6, 6–2, 6–4, 6–3
Men's Singles 4th Round	(Spain) Rafael Nadal [2]	(Croatia) Marin Čilić [22]	6–3, 3–6, 6–1, 6–2
Women's Singles 4th Round	(Canada) Bianca Andreescu [15]	(United States) Taylor Townsend [Q]	6–1, 4–6, 6–2
Matches on Louis Armstrong Stadium
Event	Winner	Loser	Score
Women's Singles 4th Round	(Croatia) Donna Vekić [23]	(Germany) Julia Görges [26]	6–7^{(5–7)}, 7–5, 6–3
Men's Singles 4th Round	(Italy) Matteo Berrettini [24]	(Russia) Andrey Rublev	6–1, 6–4, 7–6^{(8–6)}
Women's Singles 4th Round	(Belgium) Elise Mertens [25]	(United States) Kristie Ahn [WC]	6–1, 6–1
Men's Singles 4th Round	(France) Gaël Monfils [13]	(Spain) Pablo Andújar	6–1, 6–2, 6–2
Matches on Grandstand
Event	Winner	Loser	Score
Men's Doubles 3rd Round	(Austria) Oliver Marach [16] (Austria) Jürgen Melzer [16]	(Serbia) Miomir Kecmanović (Norway) Casper Ruud	6–0, 6–3
Women's Doubles 3rd Round	(Belarus) Victoria Azarenka [8] (Australia) Ashleigh Barty [8]	(United States) Cori Gauff [WC] (United States) Caty McNally [WC]	6–0, 6–1
Men's Doubles 3rd Round	(United States) Jack Sock (United States) Jackson Withrow	(United States) Bob Bryan [7] (United States) Mike Bryan [7]	6–4, 7–5
Women's Doubles 3rd Round	(Ukraine) Lyudmyla Kichenok [14] (Latvia) Jeļena Ostapenko [14]	(Chinese Taipei) Hsieh Su-wei [2] (Czech Republic) Barbora Strýcová [2]	6–4, 6–3
Mixed Doubles Quarterfinals	(Chinese Taipei) Chan Hao-ching [1] (New Zealand) Michael Venus [1]	(Czech Republic) Květa Peschke [8] (Netherlands) Wesley Koolhof [8]	6–3, 7–6^{(7–0)}
Colored background indicates a night match
Matches start at 11am, night session starts at 7pm Eastern Daylight Time (EDT)

== Day 9 (September 3) ==
- Seeds out:
  - Men's Singles: (Switzerland) Roger Federer [3], (Switzerland) Stan Wawrinka [23]
  - Women's Singles: (United Kingdom) Johanna Konta [16], (China) Wang Qiang [18]
  - Men's Doubles: (Austria) Oliver Marach / (Austria) Jürgen Melzer [16]
  - Women's Doubles: (Hungary) Tímea Babos / (France) Kristina Mladenovic [1], (China) Duan Yingying / (China) Zheng Saisai [12]
  - Mixed Doubles: (Netherlands) Demi Schuurs / (Finland) Henri Kontinen [6]
- Schedule of Play

Matches on main courts
Matches on Arthur Ashe Stadium
Event	Winner	Loser	Score
Women's Singles Quarterfinals	(Ukraine) Elina Svitolina [5]	(United Kingdom) Johanna Konta [16]	6–4, 6–4
Men's Singles Quarterfinals	(Russia) Daniil Medvedev [5]	(Switzerland) Stan Wawrinka [23]	7–6^{(8–6)}, 6–3, 3–6, 6–1
Women's Singles Quarterfinals	(United States) Serena Williams [8]	(China) Wang Qiang [18]	6–1, 6–0
Men's Singles Quarterfinals	(Bulgaria) Grigor Dimitrov	(Switzerland) Roger Federer [3]	3–6, 6–4, 3–6, 6–4, 6–2
Matches on Louis Armstrong Stadium
Event	Winner	Loser	Score
Men's Doubles Quarterfinals	(Germany) Kevin Krawietz [12] (Germany) Andreas Mies [12]	(Argentina) Leonardo Mayer (Portugal) João Sousa	7–6^{(7–4)}, 6–4
Women's Doubles Quarterfinals	(Belgium) Elise Mertens [4] (Belarus) Aryna Sabalenka [4]	(China) Duan Yingying [12] (China) Zheng Saisai [12]	6–4, 6–3
Men's Doubles Quarterfinals	(Spain) Marcel Granollers [8] (Argentina) Horacio Zeballos [8]	(Austria) Oliver Marach [16] (Austria) Jürgen Melzer [16]	7–6^{(7–4)}, 6–4
Women's Doubles Quarterfinals	(Belarus) Victoria Azarenka [8] (Australia) Ashleigh Barty [8]	(Hungary) Tímea Babos [1] (France) Kristina Mladenovic [1]	2–6, 7–5, 6–1
Mixed Doubles Quarterfinals	(Australia) Samantha Stosur [3] (United States) Rajeev Ram [3]	(Netherlands) Demi Schuurs [6] (Finland) Henri Kontinen [6]	4–6, 6–4, [14–12]
Matches on Grandstand
Event	Winner	Loser	Score
Junior Boys' Singles 1st Round	(United States) Toby Kodat [6]	(Uzbekistan) Olimjon Nabiev	6–3, 6–1
Junior Girls' Singles 2nd Round	(Russia) Oksana Selekhmeteva	(United States) Emma Navarro [1]	6–4, 4–6, 6–4
Junior Boys' Singles 2nd Round	(United States) Emilio Nava [8]	(Italy) Matteo Arnaldi	6–7^{(4–7)}, 7–5, 7–5
Junior Girls' Doubles 1st Round	(United States) Alexa Noel [1] (France) Diane Parry [1]	(United States) India Houghton [Alt] (Northern Mariana Islands) Carol Young Suh Lee [Alt]	6–1, 6–4
Junior Boys' Doubles 1st Round	(United States) Eliot Spizzirri (United States) Tyler Zink	(Japan) Ryuhei Azuma [Alt] (Japan) Taiyo Yamanaka [Alt]	6–3, 6–3
Colored background indicates a night match
Matches start at 11am, night session starts at 7pm Eastern Daylight Time (EDT)

== Day 10 (September 4) ==
- Seeds out:
  - Men's Singles: (France) Gaël Monfils [13], (Argentina) Diego Schwartzman [20]
  - Women's Singles: (Croatia) Donna Vekić [23], (Belgium) Elise Mertens [25]
  - Women's Doubles: (Canada) Gabriela Dabrowski / (China) Xu Yifan [3], (Ukraine) Lyudmyla Kichenok / (Latvia) Jeļena Ostapenko [14]
  - Mixed Doubles: (Australia) Samantha Stosur / (United States) Rajeev Ram [3], (Chinese Taipei) Latisha Chan / (Croatia) Ivan Dodig [4]
- Schedule of Play

Matches on main courts
Matches on Arthur Ashe Stadium
Event	Winner	Loser	Score
Women's Singles Quarterfinals	(Switzerland) Belinda Bencic [13]	(Croatia) Donna Vekić [23]	7–6^{(7–5)}, 6–3
Men's Singles Quarterfinals	(Italy) Matteo Berrettini [24]	(France) Gaël Monfils [13]	3–6, 6–3, 6–2, 3–6, 7–6^{(7–5)}
Women's Singles Quarterfinals	(Canada) Bianca Andreescu [15]	(Belgium) Elise Mertens [25]	3–6, 6–2, 6–3
Men's Singles Quarterfinals	(Spain) Rafael Nadal [2]	(Argentina) Diego Schwartzman [20]	6–4, 7–5, 6–2
Matches on Louis Armstrong Stadium
Event	Winner	Loser	Score
Women's Doubles Quarterfinals	(Slovakia) Viktória Kužmová (Belarus) Aliaksandra Sasnovich	(Canada) Gabriela Dabrowski [3] (China) Xu Yifan [3]	2–6, 6–3, 6–3
Men's Doubles Quarterfinals	(United Kingdom) Jamie Murray [15] (United Kingdom) Neal Skupski [15]	(United States) Jack Sock (United States) Jackson Withrow	4–6, 6–1, 7–6^{(7–4)}
Women's Doubles Quarterfinals	(United States) Caroline Dolehide [PR] (United States) Vania King [PR]	(Ukraine) Lyudmyla Kichenok [14] (Latvia) Jeļena Ostapenko [14]	7–6^{(7–2)}, 6–4
Men's Doubles Quarterfinals	(Colombia) Juan Sebastián Cabal [1] (Colombia) Robert Farah [1]	(United Kingdom) Luke Bambridge (Japan) Ben McLachlan	6–4, 6–4
Mixed Doubles Semifinals	(United States) Bethanie Mattek-Sands [WC] (United Kingdom) Jamie Murray [WC]	(Australia) Samantha Stosur [3] (United States) Rajeev Ram [3]	6–3, 6–1
Mixed Doubles Semifinals	(Chinese Taipei) Chan Hao-ching [1] (New Zealand) Michael Venus [1]	(Chinese Taipei) Latisha Chan (Croatia) Ivan Dodig [4]	7–6^{(7–3)}, 7–5
Colored background indicates a night match
Matches start at 11am, night session starts at 7pm Eastern Daylight Time (EDT)

== Day 11 (September 5) ==
- Seeds out:
  - Women's Singles: (Ukraine) Elina Svitolina [5], (Switzerland) Belinda Bencic [13]
  - Men's Doubles: (Germany) Kevin Krawietz / (Germany) Andreas Mies [12], (United Kingdom) Jamie Murray / (United Kingdom) Neal Skupski [15]
- Schedule of Play

Matches on main courts
Matches on Arthur Ashe Stadium
Event	Winner	Loser	Score
Wheelchair Women's Doubles Semifinals	(Netherlands) Diede de Groot [1] (Netherlands) Aniek van Koot [1]	(Italy) Giulia Capocci (Japan) Yui Kamiji	6–2, 7–5
Wheelchair Men's Doubles Semifinals	(Argentina) Gustavo Fernández (Japan) Shingo Kunieda	(Belgium) Joachim Gerard [2] (Sweden) Stefan Olsson [2]	6–2, 5–7, [10–3]
Women's Singles Semifinals	(United States) Serena Williams [8]	(Ukraine) Elina Svitolina [5]	6–3, 6–1
Women's Singles Semifinals	(Canada) Bianca Andreescu [15]	(Switzerland) Belinda Bencic [13]	7–6^{(7–3)}, 7–5
Matches on Louis Armstrong Stadium
Event	Winner	Loser	Score
Junior Boys' Singles 3rd Round	(United States) Brandon Nakashima [11]	(Australia) Tristan Schoolkate	6–1, 6–4
Men's Doubles Semifinals	(Spain) Marcel Granollers [8] (Argentina) Horacio Zeballos [8]	(Germany) Kevin Krawietz [12] (Germany) Andreas Mies [12]	7–6^{(7–2)}, 7–6^{(7–5)}
Men's Doubles Semifinals	(Colombia) Juan Sebastián Cabal [1] (Colombia) Robert Farah [1]	(United Kingdom) Jamie Murray [15] (United Kingdom) Neal Skupski [15]	7–6^{(7–5)}, 7–6^{(10–8)}
Women's Doubles Semifinals	(Belarus) Victoria Azarenka [8] (Australia) Ashleigh Barty [8]	(Slovakia) Viktória Kužmová (Belarus) Aliaksandra Sasnovich	6–0, 6–1
Colored background indicates a night match
Matches start at 12pm, night session starts at 7pm Eastern Daylight Time (EDT)

== Day 12 (September 6) ==
- Seeds out:
  - Men's Singles: (Italy) Matteo Berrettini [24]
  - Men's Doubles: (Spain) Marcel Granollers / (Argentina) Horacio Zeballos [8]
- Schedule of Play

Matches on main courts
Matches on Arthur Ashe Stadium
Event	Winner	Loser	Score
Men's Doubles Final	(Colombia) Juan Sebastián Cabal [1] (Colombia) Robert Farah [1]	(Spain) Marcel Granollers [8] (Argentina) Horacio Zeballos [8]	6–4, 7–5
Men's Singles Semifinals	(Russia) Daniil Medvedev [5]	(Bulgaria) Grigor Dimitrov	7–6^{(7–5)}, 6–4, 6–3
Men's Singles Semifinals	(Spain) Rafael Nadal [2]	(Italy) Matteo Berrettini [24]	7–6^{(8–6)}, 6–4, 6–1
Matches on Louis Armstrong Stadium
Event	Winner	Loser	Score
Wheelchair Men's Singles Quarterfinals	(Argentina) Gustavo Fernández [1]	(Sweden) Stefan Olsson	7–6^{(7–4)}, 6–3
Women's Doubles Semifinals	(Belgium) Elise Mertens [4] (Belarus) Aryna Sabalenka [4]	(United States) Caroline Dolehide [PR] (United States) Vania King [PR]	4–6, 6–3, 6–4
Wheelchair Quad Singles Round Robin	(Australia) Dylan Alcott	(United Kingdom) Andrew Lapthorne	0–6, 7–6^{(7–3)}, 6–3
Wheelchair Quad Singles Round Robin	(United States) David Wagner	(United States) Bryan Barten [WC]	6–0, 6–1
Wheelchair Men's Singles Quarterfinals	(France) Stéphane Houdet	(United Kingdom) Gordon Reid	4–6, 6–4, 6–1
Matches start at 12pm Eastern Daylight Time (EDT)

== Day 13 (September 7) ==
- Seeds out:
  - Women's Singles: (United States) Serena Williams [8]
  - Mixed Doubles: (Chinese Taipei) Chan Hao-ching / (New Zealand) Michael Venus [1]
- Schedule of Play

Matches on main courts
Matches on Arthur Ashe Stadium
Event	Winner	Loser	Score
Mixed Doubles Final	(United States) Bethanie Mattek-Sands [WC] (United Kingdom) Jamie Murray [WC]	(Chinese Taipei) Chan Hao-ching [1] (New Zealand) Michael Venus [1]	6–2, 6–3
Women's Singles Final	(Canada) Bianca Andreescu [15]	(United States) Serena Williams [8]	6–3, 7–5
Matches on Louis Armstrong Stadium
Event	Winner	Loser	Score
Wheelchair Women's Singles Quarterfinals	(Japan) Yui Kamiji [2]	(Netherlands) Aniek van Koot	6–1, 6–3
Junior Boys' Singles Quarterfinals	(United States) Emilio Nava [8/WC]	(Czech Republic) Jiří Lehečka [15]	6–3, 6–1
Wheelchair Quad Singles Round Robin	(Australia) Dylan Alcott [1]	(United States) David Wagner [2]	6–0, 7–6^{(7-3)}
Matches start at 12pm Eastern Daylight Time (EDT)

== Day 14 (September 8) ==
- Seeds out:
  - Men's Singles: (Russia) Daniil Medvedev [5]
  - Women's Doubles: (Belarus) Victoria Azarenka / (Australia) Ashleigh Barty [8]
- Schedule of Play

Matches on main courts
Matches on Arthur Ashe Stadium
Event	Winner	Loser	Score
Women's Doubles Final	(Belgium) Elise Mertens [4] (Belarus) Aryna Sabalenka [4]	(Belarus) Victoria Azarenka [8] (Australia) Ashleigh Barty [8]	7–5, 7–5
Men's Singles Final	(Spain) Rafael Nadal [2]	(Russia) Daniil Medvedev [5]	7–5, 6–3, 5–7, 4–6, 6–4
Matches on Louis Armstrong Stadium
Event	Winner	Loser	Score
Wheelchair Women's Singles Final	(Netherlands) Diede de Groot [1]	(Japan) Yui Kamiji [2]	4–6, 6–1, 6–4
Junior Boys' Singles Final	(Czech Republic) Jonáš Forejtek [4]	(United States) Emilio Nava [8/WC]	6–7^{(4–7)}, 6–0, 6–2
Wheelchair Men's Doubles Final	(United Kingdom) Alfie Hewett (United Kingdom) Gordon Reid	(Argentina) Gustavo Fernández (Japan) Shingo Kunieda	1–6, 6–4, [11–9]
Matches start at 12pm Eastern Daylight Time (EDT)
