= 2019 US Open (tennis) =

- Date: August 26 – September 8
- Edition: 139th
- Category: Grand Slam (ITF)
- Draw: 128S/64D/32X
- Prize money: $57,238,700
- Surface: Hard
- Location: New York City, New York, United States
- Venue: USTA Billie Jean King National Tennis Center

Champions

Men's singles
- (Spain) Rafael Nadal

Women's singles
- (Canada) Bianca Andreescu

Men's doubles
- (Colombia) Juan Sebastián Cabal / (Colombia) Robert Farah

Women's doubles
- (Belgium) Elise Mertens / (Belarus) Aryna Sabalenka

Mixed doubles
- (United States) Bethanie Mattek-Sands / (United Kingdom) Jamie Murray

Wheelchair men's singles
- (United Kingdom) Alfie Hewett

Wheelchair women's singles
- (Netherlands) Diede de Groot

Wheelchair quad singles
- (United Kingdom) Andrew Lapthorne

Wheelchair men's doubles
- (United Kingdom) Alfie Hewett / (United Kingdom) Gordon Reid

Wheelchair women's doubles
- (Netherlands) Diede de Groot / (Netherlands) Aniek van Koot

Wheelchair quad doubles
- (Australia) Dylan Alcott / (United Kingdom) Andrew Lapthorne

Boys' singles
- (Czech Republic) Jonáš Forejtek

Girls' singles
- (Colombia) Camila Osorio

Boys' doubles
- (United States) Eliot Spizzirri / (United States) Tyler Zink

Girls' doubles
- (Latvia) Kamilla Bartone / (Russia) Oksana Selekhmeteva
- US Open

The 2019 US Open was the 139th edition of tennis' US Open and the fourth and final Grand Slam event of the year. It was held on outdoor hard courts at the USTA Billie Jean King National Tennis Center in New York City.

Novak Djokovic and Naomi Osaka were the men's and women's singles defending champions, respectively. Both were defeated in the fourth round, with Djokovic retiring due to a shoulder injury after losing the first two sets against Stan Wawrinka, and Osaka losing against Belinda Bencic.

Both singles finals were rematches of the singles finals at the 2019 Canadian Open four weeks prior. Rafael Nadal won the men's singles title, defeating first time major finalist Daniil Medvedev in a five-set thriller for his 19th major singles title. Bianca Andreescu won the women's singles title, defeating Serena Williams in straight sets in the final, becoming the first Canadian to win a major singles title. Williams set an Open Era record by reaching her tenth US Open final.

== Tournament ==
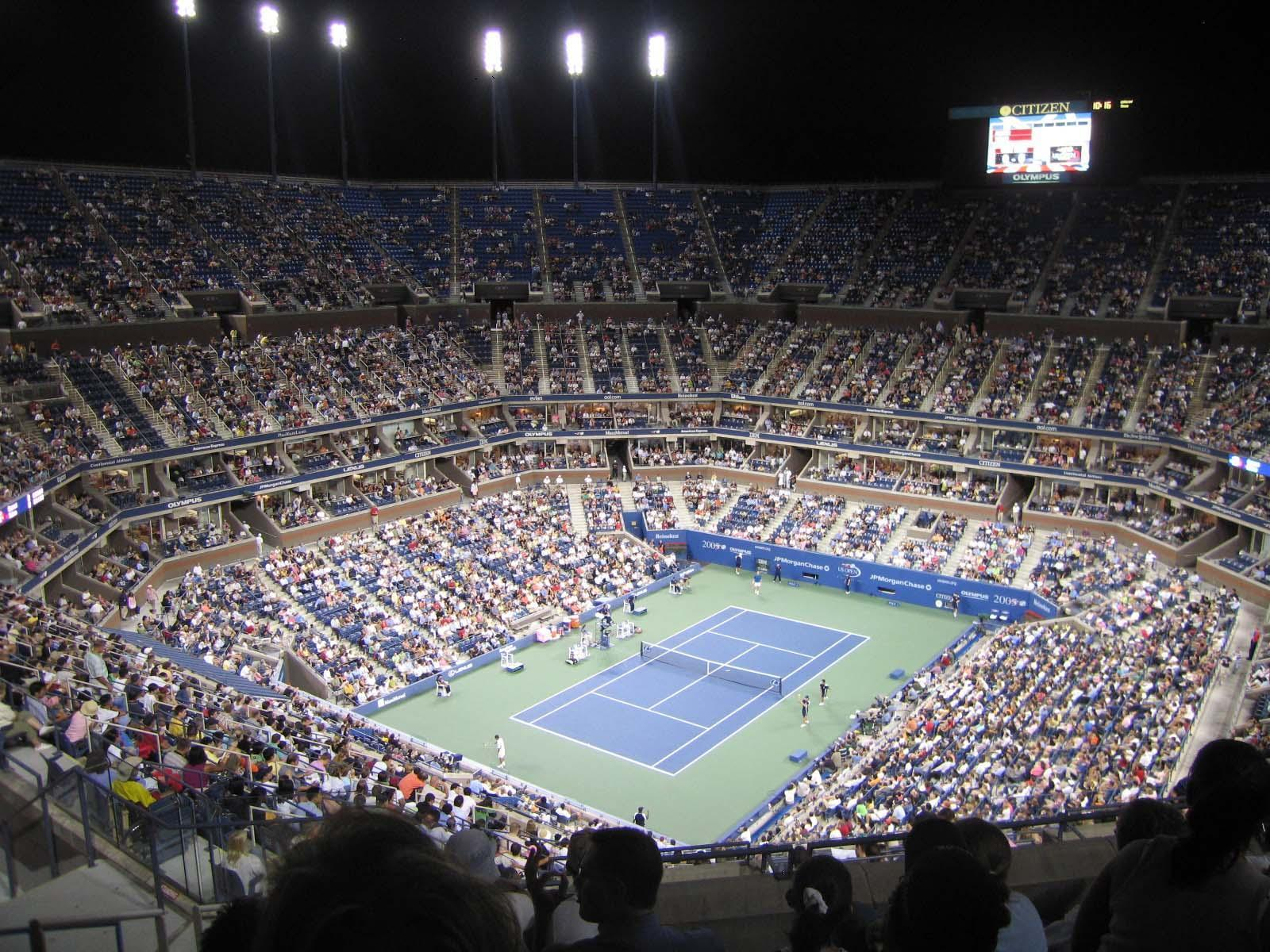
Arthur Ashe Stadium before the retractable roof was installed and where the finals of the US Open took place

The 2019 US Open was the 139th edition of the tournament and took place at the USTA Billie Jean King National Tennis Center in Flushing Meadows–Corona Park of Queens in New York City, New York, United States. The tournament was held on 17 DecoTurf hard courts.

The tournament was an event run by the International Tennis Federation (ITF) and was part of the 2019 ATP Tour and the 2019 WTA Tour calendars under the Grand Slam category. The tournament consisted of both men's and women's singles and doubles draws as well as a mixed doubles event. There were also singles and doubles events for both boys and girls (players under 18), which were part of the Grade A category of tournaments. Additionally, there were singles and doubles wheelchair tennis events for men, women and quads.

The tournament was played on hard courts and took place over a series of 17 courts with DecoTurf surface, including the three existing main showcourts – Arthur Ashe Stadium, Louis Armstrong Stadium, and Grandstand.

== Broadcast ==
In the United States, the 2019 US Open was the fifth year in a row under an 11-year, $825 million contract with ESPN, in which the broadcaster held exclusive rights to the entire tournament and the US Open Series. This meant that the tournament was not available on broadcast television. This also made ESPN the exclusive U.S. broadcaster for three of the four tennis majors.

== Point and prize money distribution ==
=== Point distribution ===
Below is a series of tables for each of the competitions showing the ranking points on offer for each event.

==== Senior ====
Event	W	F	SF	QF	Round of 16	Round of 32	Round of 64	Round of 128	Q	Q3	Q2	Q1
Men's singles	2000	1200	720	360	180	90	45	10	25	16	8	0
Men's doubles	2000	1200	720	360	180	90	0	—	—	—	—	—
Women's singles	2000	1300	780	430	240	130	70	10	40	30	20	2
Women's doubles	2000	1300	780	430	240	130	10	—	—	—	—	—

==== Wheelchair ====
Event	W	F	SF/3rd	QF/4th
Singles	800	500	375	100
Doubles	800	500	100	—
Quad singles	800	500	375	100
Quad doubles	800	100	—	—

==== Junior ====
Event	W	F	SF	QF	Round of 16	Round of 32	Q	Q3
Boys' singles	1000	600	370	200	100	45	30	20
Girls' singles	1000	600	370	200	100	45	30	20
Boys' doubles	750	450	275	150	75	—N/a	—N/a	—N/a
Girls' doubles	750	450	275	150	75	—N/a	—N/a	—N/a

==== Prize money ====
The US Open has the richest prize purse of all Grand Slams. The total prize money compensation for the 2019 US Open is $57,238,700, a more than 13.2% increase on the same total last year.

Event	W	F	SF	QF	Round of 16	Round of 32	Round of 64	Round of 128	Q3	Q2	Q1
Singles	$3,850,000	$1,900,000	$960,000	$500,000	$280,000	$163,000	$100,000	$58,000	$32,000	$18,000	$11,000
Doubles	$740,000	$370,000	$175,000	$91,000	$50,000	$30,000	$17,000	N/A	N/A	N/A	N/A
Mixed doubles	$160,000	$76,000	$38,000	$19,975	$11,400	$5,900	N/A	N/A	N/A	N/A	N/A

== Singles players ==
=== Men's singles ===
Champion		Runner-up	
(Spain) Rafael Nadal [2]		(Russia) Daniil Medvedev [5]	
Semifinals out
(Bulgaria) Grigor Dimitrov		(Italy) Matteo Berrettini [24]	
Quarterfinals out
(Switzerland) Stan Wawrinka [23]	(Switzerland) Roger Federer [3]	(France) Gaël Monfils [13]	(Argentina) Diego Schwartzman [20]
4th round out
(Serbia) Novak Djokovic [1]	(Germany) Dominik Köpfer (Q)	(Belgium) David Goffin [15]	(Australia) Alex de Minaur
(Russia) Andrey Rublev	(Spain) Pablo Andújar	(Germany) Alexander Zverev [6]	(Croatia) Marin Čilić [22]
3rd round out
(United States) Denis Kudla	(Italy) Paolo Lorenzi (LL)	(Georgia (country)) Nikoloz Basilashvili [17]	(Spain) Feliciano López
(United Kingdom) Dan Evans	(Spain) Pablo Carreño Busta	(Poland) Kamil Majchrzak (LL)	(Japan) Kei Nishikori [7]
(Australia) Nick Kyrgios [28]	(Australia) Alexei Popyrin	(Canada) Denis Shapovalov	(Kazakhstan) Alexander Bublik
(Slovenia) Aljaž Bedene	(United States) Tennys Sandgren	(United States) John Isner [14]	(South Korea) Chung Hyeon (Q)
2nd round out
(Argentina) Juan Ignacio Londero	(Serbia) Dušan Lajović [27]	(France) Jérémy Chardy	(Serbia) Miomir Kecmanović
(United States) Reilly Opelka	(United States) Jenson Brooksby (Q)	(Japan) Yoshihito Nishioka	(Bolivia) Hugo Dellien
(Bosnia and Herzegovina) Damir Džumhur	(France) Lucas Pouille [25]	(Lithuania) Ričardas Berankis	(France) Grégoire Barrère (Q)
(Croatia) Borna Ćorić [12]	(Uruguay) Pablo Cuevas	(Chile) Cristian Garín [31]	(United States) Bradley Klahn
(France) Gilles Simon	(France) Antoine Hoang (WC)	(Australia) Jordan Thompson	(Kazakhstan) Mikhail Kukushkin
(Romania) Marius Copil	(Switzerland) Henri Laaksonen	(Italy) Lorenzo Sonego	(Italy) Thomas Fabbiano
(United States) Frances Tiafoe	(France) Benoît Paire [29]	(Belarus) Egor Gerasimov (Q)	(Canada) Vasek Pospisil (PR)
(Germany) Jan-Lennard Struff	(Germany) Cedrik-Marcel Stebe (PR)	(Spain) Fernando Verdasco [32]	(Australia) Thanasi Kokkinakis (WC)
1st round out
(Spain) Roberto Carballés Baena	(United States) Sam Querrey	(Serbia) Janko Tipsarević (PR)	(Belgium) Steve Darcis (PR)
(Italy) Jannik Sinner (Q)	(Poland) Hubert Hurkacz	(Serbia) Laslo Đere	(United States) Zachary Svajda (WC)
(Italy) Fabio Fognini [11]	(Spain) Jaume Munar	(Czech Republic) Tomáš Berdych (PR)	(Hungary) Márton Fucsovics
(United States) Taylor Fritz [26]	(United States) Marcos Giron (WC)	(South Korea) Kwon Soon-woo (Q)	(India) Prajnesh Gunneswaran
(India) Sumit Nagal (Q)	(France) Elliot Benchetrit (Q)	(France) Adrian Mannarino	(Germany) Philipp Kohlschreiber
(Argentina) Guido Pella [19]	(Czech Republic) Jiří Veselý (Q)	(United Kingdom) Cameron Norrie	(France) Corentin Moutet
(Russia) Evgeny Donskoy (Q)	(Italy) Andreas Seppi	(United States) Jack Sock (WC)	(Chile) Nicolás Jarry
(United States) Christopher Eubanks (WC)	(France) Pierre-Hugues Herbert	(Brazil) Thiago Monteiro	(Argentina) Marco Trungelliti (Q)
(Greece) Stefanos Tsitsipas [8]	(United States) Bjorn Fratangelo (WC)	(Argentina) Leonardo Mayer	(United States) Steve Johnson
(France) Richard Gasquet	(Portugal) João Sousa	(Argentina) Federico Delbonis	(Spain) Roberto Bautista Agut [10]
(Spain) Albert Ramos Viñolas	(France) Ugo Humbert	(Italy) Marco Cecchinato	(Canada) Félix Auger-Aliassime [18]
(United Kingdom) Kyle Edmund [30]	(Spain) Marcel Granollers	(Colombia) Santiago Giraldo (Q)	(Austria) Dominic Thiem [4]
(Moldova) Radu Albot	(Croatia) Ivo Karlović	(Slovakia) Jozef Kovalík (PR)	(Canada) Brayden Schnur
(Netherlands) Robin Haase	(South Africa) Lloyd Harris	(France) Jo-Wilfried Tsonga	(Russia) Karen Khachanov [9]
(Spain) Guillermo García López (Q)	(Norway) Casper Ruud	(Serbia) Filip Krajinović	(Slovakia) Martin Kližan
(Germany) Tobias Kamke (Q)	(United States) Ernesto Escobedo (WC)	(Belarus) Ilya Ivashka (Q)	(Australia) John Millman

=== Women's singles ===
Champion		Runner-up	
(Canada) Bianca Andreescu [15]		(United States) Serena Williams [8]	
Semifinals out
(Switzerland) Belinda Bencic [13]		(Ukraine) Elina Svitolina [5]	
Quarterfinals out
(Croatia) Donna Vekić [23]	(Belgium) Elise Mertens [25]	(United Kingdom) Johanna Konta [16]	(China) Wang Qiang [18]
4th round out
(Japan) Naomi Osaka [1]	(Germany) Julia Görges [26]	(United States) Taylor Townsend (Q)	(United States) Kristie Ahn (WC)
(United States) Madison Keys [10]	(Czech Republic) Karolína Plíšková [3]	(Croatia) Petra Martić [22]	(Australia) Ashleigh Barty [2]
3rd round out
(United States) Cori Gauff (WC)	(Estonia) Anett Kontaveit [21]	(Kazakhstan) Yulia Putintseva	(Netherlands) Kiki Bertens [7]
(Romania) Sorana Cîrstea	(Denmark) Caroline Wozniacki [19]	(Latvia) Jeļena Ostapenko	(Germany) Andrea Petkovic
(Ukraine) Dayana Yastremska [32]	(United States) Sofia Kenin [20]	(China) Zhang Shuai [33]	(Tunisia) Ons Jabeur
(Czech Republic) Karolína Muchová	(Latvia) Anastasija Sevastova [12]	(France) Fiona Ferro	(Greece) Maria Sakkari [30]
2nd round out
(Poland) Magda Linette	(Hungary) Tímea Babos (Q)	(Australia) Ajla Tomljanović	(France) Alizé Cornet
(Belarus) Aryna Sabalenka [9]	(Estonia) Kaia Kanepi	(United States) Francesca Di Lorenzo (WC)	(Russia) Anastasia Pavlyuchenkova
(Romania) Simona Halep [4]	(Spain) Aliona Bolsova	(United States) Danielle Collins	(Belgium) Kirsten Flipkens (LL)
(Russia) Anna Kalinskaya (Q)	(United States) Alison Riske	(Czech Republic) Kristýna Plíšková	(Czech Republic) Petra Kvitová [6]
(United States) Venus Williams	(Sweden) Rebecca Peterson	(Germany) Laura Siegemund	(China) Zhu Lin
(Russia) Margarita Gasparyan	(Russia) Ekaterina Alexandrova	(Belarus) Aliaksandra Sasnovich	(Georgia (country)) Mariam Bolkvadze (Q)
(United States) Caty McNally (WC)	(Chinese Taipei) Hsieh Su-wei [29]	(Romania) Ana Bogdan (Q)	(Poland) Iga Świątek
(France) Kristina Mladenovic	(Belgium) Alison Van Uytvanck	(China) Peng Shuai (Q)	(United States) Lauren Davis
1st round out
(Russia) Anna Blinkova	(Australia) Astra Sharma	(Russia) Anastasia Potapova	(Spain) Carla Suárez Navarro [28]
(Spain) Sara Sorribes Tormo	(Czech Republic) Marie Bouzková	(United States) Jessica Pegula	(Luxembourg) Mandy Minella
(Belarus) Victoria Azarenka	(United States) Madison Brengle	(Germany) Tatjana Maria	(Netherlands) Richèl Hogenkamp (Q)
(Russia) Natalia Vikhlyantseva	(Russia) Veronika Kudermetova	(France) Pauline Parmentier	(Spain) Paula Badosa (LL)
(United States) Nicole Gibbs (LL)	(Ukraine) Kateryna Kozlova	(Czech Republic) Kateřina Siniaková	(Czech Republic) Barbora Strýcová [31]
(China) Wang Yafan	(Slovenia) Polona Hercog	(China) Wang Xiyu (LL)	(United States) Katie Volynets (WC)
(United States) Sloane Stephens [11]	(Russia) Svetlana Kuznetsova (PR)	(Serbia) Aleksandra Krunić	(Spain) Garbiñe Muguruza [24]
(Switzerland) Jil Teichmann	(France) Diane Parry (WC)	(Romania) Mihaela Buzărnescu	(Czech Republic) Denisa Allertová (Q)
(United States) Whitney Osuigwe (WC)	(China) Zheng Saisai	(Puerto Rico) Monica Puig	(Romania) Monica Niculescu
(United States) CoCo Vandeweghe (PR)	(Poland) Magdalena Fręch (Q)	(China) Wang Xinyu (Q)	(Japan) Misaki Doi
(Russia) Daria Kasatkina	(Australia) Priscilla Hon (LL)	(Australia) Samantha Stosur (WC)	(Switzerland) Viktorija Golubic
(France) Caroline Garcia [27]	(United States) Jennifer Brady	(United States) Bernarda Pera	(Czech Republic) Tereza Martincová (Q)
(Russia) Maria Sharapova	(Switzerland) Timea Bacsinszky	(Kazakhstan) Elena Rybakina (Q)	(Slovakia) Jana Čepelová (Q)
(Slovenia) Tamara Zidanšek	(United Kingdom) Harriet Dart (Q)	(Serbia) Ivana Jorović	(Canada) Eugenie Bouchard
(Germany) Angelique Kerber [14]	(Australia) Daria Gavrilova	(Slovakia) Viktória Kužmová	(United States) Caroline Dolehide (Q)
(Italy) Camila Giorgi	(United States) Varvara Lepchenko (LL)	(Sweden) Johanna Larsson (Q)	(Kazakhstan) Zarina Diyas

== Singles seeds ==
The following are the seeded players and notable players who have withdrawn from the event. Seedings are based on ATP and WTA rankings as of August 19, 2019. Rank and points before are as of August 26, 2019.

=== Men's singles ===
Seed	Rank	Player	Points before	Points defending	Points won	Points after	Status
1	1	(Serbia) Novak Djokovic	11,685	2,000	180	9,865	Fourth round retired against (Switzerland) Stan Wawrinka [23]
2	2	(Spain) Rafael Nadal	7,945	720	2,000	9,225	Champion, defeated (Russia) Daniil Medvedev [5]
3	3	(Switzerland) Roger Federer	6,950	180	360	7,130	Quarterfinals lost to (Bulgaria) Grigor Dimitrov
4	4	(Austria) Dominic Thiem	4,925	360	10	4,575	First round lost to (Italy) Thomas Fabbiano
5	5	(Russia) Daniil Medvedev	4,125	90	1,200	5,235	Runner-up, lost to (Spain) Rafael Nadal [2]
6	6	(Germany) Alexander Zverev	4,005	90	180	4,095	Fourth round lost to (Argentina) Diego Schwartzman [20]
7	7	(Japan) Kei Nishikori	4,005	720	90	3,375	Third round lost to (Australia) Alex de Minaur
8	8	(Greece) Stefanos Tsitsipas	3,455	45	10	3,420	First round lost to (Russia) Andrey Rublev
9	9	(Russia) Karen Khachanov	2,890	90	10	2,810	First round lost to (Canada) Vasek Pospisil [PR]
10	10	(Spain) Roberto Bautista Agut	2,575	10	10	2,575	First round lost to (Kazakhstan) Mikhail Kukushkin
11	11	(Italy) Fabio Fognini	2,510	45	10	2,475	First round lost to (United States) Reilly Opelka
12	12	(Croatia) Borna Ćorić	2,160	180	45	2,025	Second round withdrew due to lower back strain
13	13	(France) Gaël Monfils	2,140	45	360	2,455	Quarterfinals lost to (Italy) Matteo Berrettini [24]
14	14	(United States) John Isner	2,075	360	90	1,805	Third round lost to (Croatia) Marin Čilić [22]
15	15	(Belgium) David Goffin	2,055	180	180	2,055	Fourth round lost to (Switzerland) Roger Federer [3]
~~16~~	~~17~~	~~(South Africa) Kevin Anderson~~	2,050	180	0	1,870	Withdrew due to knee injury
17	18	(Georgia (country)) Nikoloz Basilashvili	1,985	180	90	1,895	Third round lost to (Germany) Dominik Köpfer [Q]
18	19	(Canada) Félix Auger-Aliassime	1,750	35	10	1,725	First round lost to (Canada) Denis Shapovalov
19	20	(Argentina) Guido Pella	1,735	90	10	1,655	First round lost to (Spain) Pablo Carreño Busta
20	21	(Argentina) Diego Schwartzman	1,725	90	360	1,995	Quarterfinals lost to (Spain) Rafael Nadal [2]
~~21~~	~~22~~	~~(Canada) Milos Raonic~~	1,630	180	0	1,450	Withdrew due to gluteal injury
22	23	(Croatia) Marin Čilić	1,590	360	180	1,410	Fourth round lost to (Spain) Rafael Nadal [2]
23	24	(Switzerland) Stan Wawrinka	1,535	90	360	1,805	Quarterfinals lost to (Russia) Daniil Medvedev [5]
24	25	(Italy) Matteo Berrettini	1,535	10	720	2,245	Semifinals lost to (Spain) Rafael Nadal [2]
25	27	(France) Lucas Pouille	1,475	90	45	1,430	Second round lost to (United Kingdom) Dan Evans
26	28	(United States) Taylor Fritz	1,465	90	10	1,385	First round lost to (Spain) Feliciano López
27	29	(Serbia) Dušan Lajović	1,441	90	45	1,396	Second round lost to (United States) Denis Kudla
28	30	(Australia) Nick Kyrgios	1,430	90	90	1,430	Third round lost to (Russia) Andrey Rublev
29	26	(France) Benoît Paire	1,508	45	45	1,508	Second round lost to (Slovenia) Aljaž Bedene
30	31	(United Kingdom) Kyle Edmund	1,325	10	10	1,325	First round lost to (Spain) Pablo Andújar
31	32	(Chile) Cristian Garín	1,321	(48+25)^{†}	45+6	1,299	Second round lost to (Australia) Alex de Minaur
32	34	(Spain) Fernando Verdasco	1,310	90	45	1,265	Second round lost to (South Korea) Chung Hyeon [Q]

† The player did not qualify for the tournament in 2018, but is defending points from two 2018 ATP Challenger Tour tournaments (Como and Genoa).

The following player would have been seeded, but withdrew before the event.

Rank	Player	Points before	Points defending	Points after	Withdrawal reason
16	(Argentina) Juan Martín del Potro	2,050	1,200	850	Right knee injury

=== Women's singles ===
Seed	Rank	Player	Points before	Points defending	Points won	Points after	Status
1	1	(Japan) Naomi Osaka	6,606	2,000	240	4,846	Fourth round lost to (Switzerland) Belinda Bencic [13]
2	2	(Australia) Ashleigh Barty	6,501	240	240	6,501	Fourth round lost to (China) Wang Qiang [18]
3	3	(Czech Republic) Karolína Plíšková	6,315	430	240	6,125	Fourth round lost to (United Kingdom) Johanna Konta [16]
4	4	(Romania) Simona Halep	4,743	10	70	4,803	Second round lost to (United States) Taylor Townsend [Q]
5	5	(Ukraine) Elina Svitolina	4,492	240	780	5,032	Semifinals lost to (United States) Serena Williams [8]
6	6	(Czech Republic) Petra Kvitová	4,386	130	70	4,326	Second round lost to (Germany) Andrea Petkovic
7	7	(Netherlands) Kiki Bertens	4,325	130	130	4,325	Third round lost to (Germany) Julia Görges [26]
8	8	(United States) Serena Williams	3,935	1,300	1,300	3,935	Runner-up, lost to (Canada) Bianca Andreescu [15]
9	13	(Belarus) Aryna Sabalenka	2,955	240	70	2,785	Second round lost to (Kazakhstan) Yulia Putintseva
10	9	(United States) Madison Keys	3,267	780	240	2,727	Fourth round lost to (Ukraine) Elina Svitolina [5]
11	10	(United States) Sloane Stephens	3,189	430	10	2,769	First round lost to (Russia) Anna Kalinskaya [Q]
12	11	(Latvia) Anastasija Sevastova	3,167	780	130	2,517	Third round lost to (Croatia) Petra Martić [22]
13	12	(Switzerland) Belinda Bencic	2,968	10	780	3,738	Semifinals lost to (Canada) Bianca Andreescu [15]
14	14	(Germany) Angelique Kerber	2,870	130	10	2,750	First round lost to (France) Kristina Mladenovic
15	15	(Canada) Bianca Andreescu	2,837	2	2,000	4,835	Champion, defeated (United States) Serena Williams [8]
16	16	(United Kingdom) Johanna Konta	2,695	10	430	3,115	Quarterfinals lost to (Ukraine) Elina Svitolina [5]
~~17~~	~~17~~	~~(Czech Republic) Markéta Vondroušová~~	2,650	240	0	2,410	Withdrew due to left wrist injury
18	18	(China) Wang Qiang	2,646	130	430	2,946	Quarterfinals lost to (United States) Serena Williams [8]
19	19	(Denmark) Caroline Wozniacki	2,537	70	130	2,597	Third round lost to (Canada) Bianca Andreescu [15]
20	20	(United States) Sofia Kenin	2,460	130	130	2,460	Third round lost to (United States) Madison Keys [10]
21	21	(Estonia) Anett Kontaveit	2,380	10	130	2,500	Third round withdrew due to illness
22	22	(Croatia) Petra Martić	2,067	10+160	240+1	2,138	Fourth round lost to (United States) Serena Williams [8]
23	23	(Croatia) Donna Vekić	2,000	10	430	2,420	Quarterfinals lost to (Switzerland) Belinda Bencic [13]
24	25	(Spain) Garbiñe Muguruza	1,920	70	10	1,860	First round lost to (United States) Alison Riske
25	26	(Belgium) Elise Mertens	1,920	240	430	2,110	Quarterfinals lost to (Canada) Bianca Andreescu [15]
26	30	(Germany) Julia Görges	1,785	70	240	1,955	Fourth round lost to (Croatia) Donna Vekić [23]
27	27	(France) Caroline Garcia	1,831	130	10	1,711	First round lost to (Tunisia) Ons Jabeur
28	33	(Spain) Carla Suárez Navarro	1,562	430	10	1,142	First round retired against (Hungary) Tímea Babos [Q]
29	28	(Chinese Taipei) Hsieh Su-wei	1,830	70	70	1,830	Second round lost to (Czech Republic) Karolína Muchová
30	29	(Greece) Maria Sakkari	1,800	70	130	1,860	Third round lost to (Australia) Ashleigh Barty [2]
31	31	(Czech Republic) Barbora Strýcová	1,750	130	10	1,630	First round lost to (Spain) Aliona Bolsova
32	32	(Ukraine) Dayana Yastremska	1,679	10+29	130+25	1,795	Third round lost to (Ukraine) Elina Svitolina [5]
33	34	(China) Zhang Shuai	1,535	10	130	1,655	Third round lost to (United Kingdom) Johanna Konta [16]

The following player would have been seeded, but withdrew before the event.

Rank	Player	Points before	Points defending	Points after	Withdrawal reason
24	(United States) Amanda Anisimova	1,934	10	1,924	Family emergency (father's death)

== Doubles seeds ==
=== Men's doubles ===
Team		Rank^{1}	Seed
(Colombia) Juan Sebastián Cabal	(Colombia) Robert Farah	2	1
(Poland) Łukasz Kubot	(Brazil) Marcelo Melo	9	2
(South Africa) Raven Klaasen	(New Zealand) Michael Venus	17	3
(France) Pierre-Hugues Herbert	(France) Nicolas Mahut	25	4
(Netherlands) Jean-Julien Rojer	(Romania) Horia Tecău	25	5
(Croatia) Mate Pavić	(Brazil) Bruno Soares	30	6
(United States) Bob Bryan	(United States) Mike Bryan	32	7
(Spain) Marcel Granollers	(Argentina) Horacio Zeballos	34	8
(Croatia) Nikola Mektić	(Croatia) Franko Škugor	42	9
(United States) Rajeev Ram	(United Kingdom) Joe Salisbury	43	10
(Croatia) Ivan Dodig	(Slovakia) Filip Polášek	45	11
(Germany) Kevin Krawietz	(Germany) Andreas Mies	47	12
(Netherlands) Robin Haase	(Netherlands) Wesley Koolhof	51	13
(Finland) Henri Kontinen	(Australia) John Peers	54	14
(United Kingdom) Jamie Murray	(United Kingdom) Neal Skupski	57	15
(Austria) Oliver Marach	(Austria) Jürgen Melzer	58	16

^{1}Rankings as of August 19, 2019.

=== Women's doubles ===
Team		Rank^{1}	Seed
(Hungary) Tímea Babos	(France) Kristina Mladenovic	5	1
(Chinese Taipei) Hsieh Su-wei	(Czech Republic) Barbora Strýcová	6	2
(Canada) Gabriela Dabrowski	(China) Xu Yifan	22	3
(Belgium) Elise Mertens	(Belarus) Aryna Sabalenka	22	4
(Germany) Anna-Lena Grönefeld	(Netherlands) Demi Schuurs	22	5
(Australia) Samantha Stosur	(China) Zhang Shuai	23	6
(Chinese Taipei) Chan Hao-ching	(Chinese Taipei) Latisha Chan	33	7
(Belarus) Victoria Azarenka	(Australia) Ashleigh Barty	35	8
(United States) Nicole Melichar	(Czech Republic) Květa Peschke	36	9
(Czech Republic) Lucie Hradecká	(Slovenia) Andreja Klepač	44	10
(Belgium) Kirsten Flipkens	(Sweden) Johanna Larsson	51	11
(China) Duan Yingying	(China) Zheng Saisai	53	12
(Croatia) Darija Jurak	(Spain) María José Martínez Sánchez	72	13
(Ukraine) Lyudmyla Kichenok	(Latvia) Jeļena Ostapenko	74	14
(Russia) Veronika Kudermetova	(Kazakhstan) Galina Voskoboeva	74	15
(United States) Raquel Atawo	(United States) Asia Muhammad	74	16

^{1}Rankings as of August 19, 2019.

=== Mixed doubles ===
Team		Seed
(Chinese Taipei) Chan Hao-ching	(New Zealand) Michael Venus	1
(Canada) Gabriela Dabrowski	(Croatia) Mate Pavić	2
(Australia) Samantha Stosur	(United States) Rajeev Ram	3
(Chinese Taipei) Latisha Chan	(Croatia) Ivan Dodig	4
(United States) Nicole Melichar	(Brazil) Bruno Soares	5
(Netherlands) Demi Schuurs	(Finland) Henri Kontinen	6
(Germany) Anna-Lena Grönefeld	(Austria) Oliver Marach	7
(Czech Republic) Květa Peschke	(Netherlands) Wesley Koolhof	8

^{1}Rankings as of August 19, 2019.

== Events ==
=== Men's singles ===
- (Spain) Rafael Nadal def. (Russia) Daniil Medvedev, 7–5, 6–3, 5–7, 4–6, 6–4

=== Women's singles ===
- (Canada) Bianca Andreescu def. (United States) Serena Williams, 6–3, 7–5

=== Men's doubles ===
- (Colombia) Juan Sebastián Cabal / (Colombia) Robert Farah def. (Spain) Marcel Granollers / (Argentina) Horacio Zeballos, 6–4, 7–5

=== Women's doubles ===
- (Belgium) Elise Mertens / (Belarus) Aryna Sabalenka def. (Belarus) Victoria Azarenka / (Australia) Ashleigh Barty, 7–5, 7–5

=== Mixed doubles ===
- (United States) Bethanie Mattek-Sands / (United Kingdom) Jamie Murray def. (Chinese Taipei) Chan Hao-ching / (New Zealand) Michael Venus, 6–2, 6–3

=== Junior boys' singles ===
- (Czech Republic) Jonáš Forejtek def. (United States) Emilio Nava, 6–7^{(4–7)}, 6–0, 6–2

=== Junior girls' singles ===
- (Colombia) Camila Osorio def. (United States) Alexandra Yepifanova, 6–1, 6–0

=== Junior boys' doubles ===
- (United States) Eliot Spizzirri / (United States) Tyler Zink def. (Czech Republic) Andrew Paulson / (Belarus) Alexander Zgirovsky, 7–6^{(7–4)}, 6–4

=== Junior girls' doubles ===
- (Latvia) Kamilla Bartone / (Russia) Oksana Selekhmeteva def. (France) Aubane Droguet / (France) Séléna Janicijevic, 7–5, 7–6^{(8–6)}

=== Wheelchair men's singles ===
- (United Kingdom) Alfie Hewett def. (France) Stéphane Houdet, 7–6^{(11–9)}, 7–6^{(7–5)}

=== Wheelchair women's singles ===
- (Netherlands) Diede de Groot def. (Japan) Yui Kamiji, 4–6, 6–1, 6–4

=== Wheelchair quad singles ===
- (United Kingdom) Andrew Lapthorne def. (Australia) Dylan Alcott, 6–1, 6–0

=== Wheelchair men's doubles ===
- (United Kingdom) Alfie Hewett / (United Kingdom) Gordon Reid def. (Argentina) Gustavo Fernández / (Japan) Shingo Kunieda, 1–6, 6–4, [11–9]

=== Wheelchair women's doubles ===
- (Netherlands) Diede de Groot / (Netherlands) Aniek van Koot def. (Germany) Sabine Ellerbrock / (South Africa) Kgothatso Montjane, 6–2, 6–0

=== Wheelchair quad doubles ===
- (Australia) Dylan Alcott / (United Kingdom) Andrew Lapthorne def. (United States) Bryan Barten / (United States) David Wagner, 6–7^{(5–7)}, 6–1, [10–6]

== Wild card entries ==
The following players will be given wildcards to the main draw based on internal selection and recent performances.

=== Men's singles ===
- (United States) Ernesto Escobedo
- (United States) Christopher Eubanks
- (United States) Bjorn Fratangelo
- (United States) Marcos Giron
- (France) Antoine Hoang (Note: Recipient of the USTA's Grand Slam Reciprocal Wildcard Agreement with the French Tennis Federation)
- (Australia) Thanasi Kokkinakis (Note: Recipient of the USTA's Grand Slam Reciprocal Wildcard Agreement with Tennis Australia)
- (United States) Jack Sock
- (United States) Zachary Svajda (Note: Winner of the USTA Boys' under-18 national tournament)

=== Women's singles ===
- (United States) Kristie Ahn
- (United States) Francesca Di Lorenzo
- (United States) Cori Gauff
- (United States) Caty McNally
- (United States) Whitney Osuigwe
- (France) Diane Parry
- (Australia) Samantha Stosur
- (United States) Katie Volynets (Note: Winner of the USTA Girls' under-18 national tournament)

=== Men's doubles ===
- (United States) Maxime Cressy / (United States) Keegan Smith
- (United States) Martin Damm / (United States) Toby Kodat
- (United States) Robert Galloway / (United States) Nathaniel Lammons
- (United States) Evan King / (United States) Hunter Reese
- (United States) Thai-Son Kwiatkowski / (United States) Noah Rubin
- (United States) Mitchell Krueger / (United States) Tim Smyczek
- (United States) Nicholas Monroe / (United States) Tennys Sandgren

=== Women's doubles ===
- (United States) Kristie Ahn / (United States) Christina McHale
- (United States) Usue Maitane Arconada / (United States) Hayley Carter
- (United States) Hailey Baptiste / (United States) Emma Navarro
- (United States) Francesca Di Lorenzo / (United States) Ann Li
- (United States) Abigail Forbes / (United States) Alexa Noel
- (United States) Cori Gauff / (United States) Caty McNally
- (United States) Whitney Osuigwe / (United States) Taylor Townsend

=== Mixed doubles ===
- (United States) Hailey Baptiste / (United States) Jenson Brooksby
- (United States) Jennifer Brady / (United States) Denis Kudla
- (United States) Hayley Carter / (United States) Jackson Withrow
- (United States) Kaitlyn Christian / (United States) James Cerretani
- (United States) Danielle Collins / (United States) Nicholas Monroe
- (United States) Bethanie Mattek-Sands / (United Kingdom) Jamie Murray
- (United States) Christina McHale / (United States) Ryan Harrison
- (United States) CoCo Vandeweghe / (United States) Maxime Cressy

== Qualifier entries ==
The qualifying competitions took place at USTA Billie Jean King National Tennis Center was scheduled on August 19 – 23, 2019.

=== Men's singles ===
1. (France) Elliot Benchetrit
2. (Colombia) Santiago Giraldo
3. (South Korea) Kwon Soon-woo
4. (Belarus) Ilya Ivashka
5. (Russia) Evgeny Donskoy
6. (Belarus) Egor Gerasimov
7. (Germany) Tobias Kamke
8. (France) Grégoire Barrère
9. (South Korea) Chung Hyeon
10. (United States) Jenson Brooksby
11. (Germany) Dominik Köpfer
12. (Spain) Guillermo García López
13. (India) Sumit Nagal
14. (Italy) Jannik Sinner
15. (Czech Republic) Jiří Veselý
16. (Argentina) Marco Trungelliti

Lucky losers

1. (Italy) Paolo Lorenzi
2. (Poland) Kamil Majchrzak

=== Women's singles ===
1. (Kazakhstan) Elena Rybakina
2. (Poland) Magdalena Fręch
3. (Slovakia) Jana Čepelová
4. (China) Peng Shuai
5. (Sweden) Johanna Larsson
6. (United States) Caroline Dolehide
7. (Romania) Ana Bogdan
8. (Georgia (country)) Mariam Bolkvadze
9. (Czech Republic) Denisa Allertová
10. (United Kingdom) Harriet Dart
11. (Hungary) Tímea Babos
12. (Netherlands) Richèl Hogenkamp
13. (United States) Taylor Townsend
14. (China) Wang Xinyu
15. (Czech Republic) Tereza Martincová
16. (Russia) Anna Kalinskaya

Lucky losers

1. (Spain) Paula Badosa
2. (United States) Varvara Lepchenko
3. (United States) Nicole Gibbs
4. (Australia) Priscilla Hon
5. (Belgium) Kirsten Flipkens
6. (China) Wang Xiyu

== Protected ranking ==
The following players were accepted directly into the main draw using a protected ranking:

Men's singles

- (Czech Republic) Tomáš Berdych (57)
- (Canada) Vasek Pospisil (73)
- (Slovakia) Jozef Kovalík (85)
- (Serbia) Janko Tipsarević (88)
- (Belgium) Steve Darcis (90)
- (Germany) Cedrik-Marcel Stebe (95)

Women's singles

- (United States) CoCo Vandeweghe (100)
- (Russia) Svetlana Kuznetsova (102)

== Withdrawals ==
The following players were accepted directly into the main tournament, but withdrew due to injury, suspension, or personal reasons:

Men's singles

- ‡ (United States) Mackenzie McDonald (96) → replaced by (Spain) Albert Ramos Viñolas (99)
- ‡ (Argentina) Juan Martín del Potro (12) → replaced by (United States) Denis Kudla (100)
- § (South Africa) Kevin Anderson (7) → replaced by (Italy) Paolo Lorenzi (LL)
- § (Canada) Milos Raonic (21) → replaced by (Poland) Kamil Majchrzak (LL)

Women's singles

- ‡ (Slovakia) Dominika Cibulková (63) → replaced by (Russia) Svetlana Kuznetsova (102 PR)
- ‡ (United States) Catherine Bellis (43 PR) → replaced by (China) Zhu Lin (103)
- ‡ (Brazil) Beatriz Haddad Maia (96) → replaced by (Czech Republic) Marie Bouzková (104)
- † (Russia) Vera Zvonareva (78) → replaced by (United States) Nicole Gibbs (LL)
- † (Slovakia) Anna Karolína Schmiedlová (93) → replaced by (Spain) Paula Badosa (LL)
- † (United States) Amanda Anisimova (23) → replaced by (United States) Varvara Lepchenko (LL)
- § (Czech Republic) Markéta Vondroušová (16) → replaced by (Australia) Priscilla Hon (LL)
- § (Germany) Mona Barthel (97) → replaced by (Belgium) Kirsten Flipkens (LL)
- § (Ukraine) Lesia Tsurenko (36) → replaced by (China) Wang Xiyu (LL)

‡ – withdrew from entry list before qualifying began
† – withdrew from entry list after qualifying began
§ – withdrew from main draw

== Notes ==
Preceded by 2019 Wimbledon Championships	Grand Slams	Succeeded by 2020 Australian Open
