= 2019 US Open – Women's singles =

Women's singles
- 2019 US Open

Final
- Champion: (Canada) Bianca Andreescu
- Runner-up: (United States) Serena Williams
- Score: 6–3, 7–5

Details
- Draw: 128 (16Q / 8WC)
- Seeds: 32

Events
Singles	men	women		boys	girls
Doubles	men	women	mixed	boys	girls
WC Singles	men	women	quad
WC Doubles	men	women	quad
Legends	men	women	mixed
- US Open

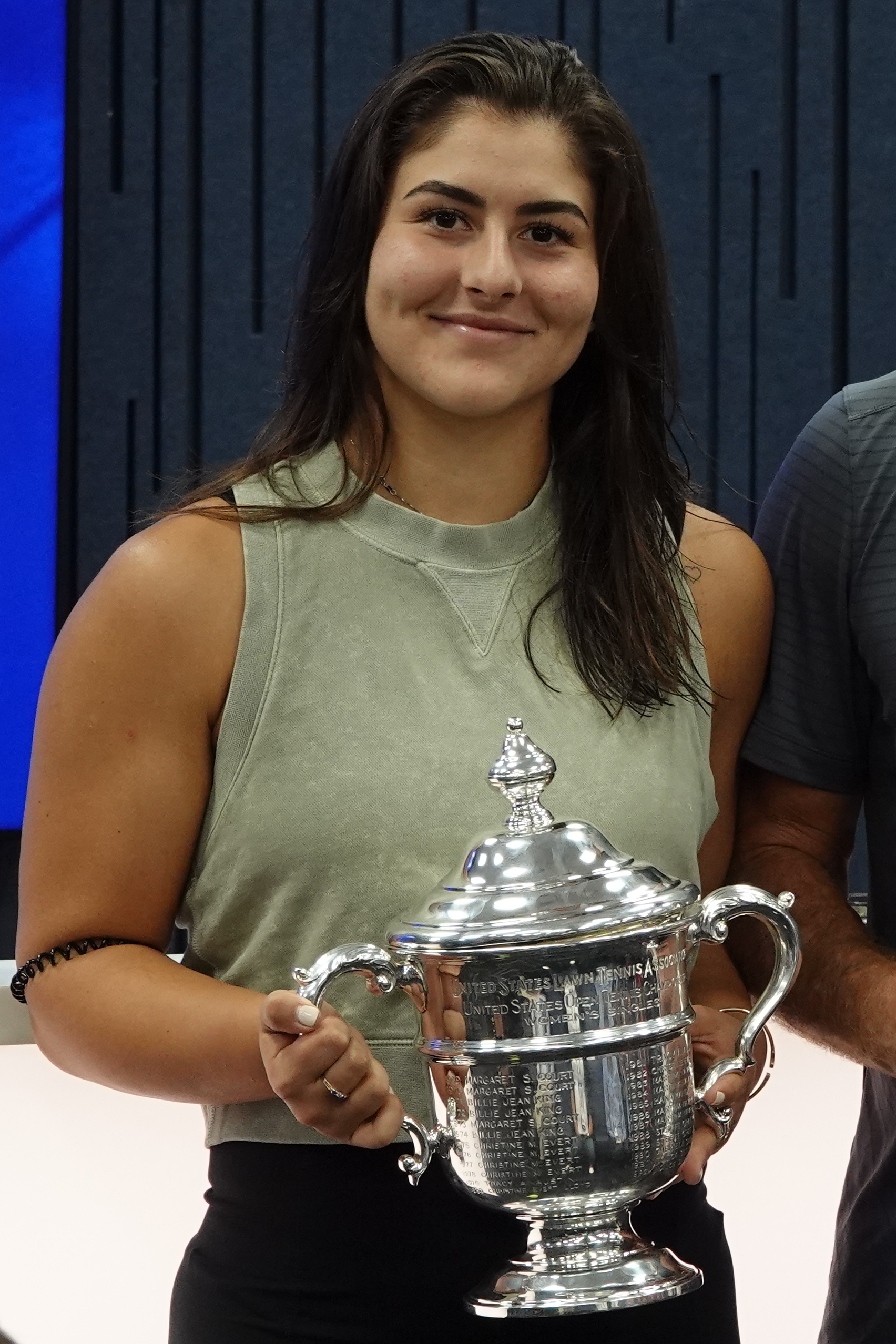
Champion Bianca Andreescu with the trophy

Bianca Andreescu defeated Serena Williams in the final, 6–3, 7–5 to win the women's singles tennis title at the 2019 US Open. It was her first major title. Andreescu was the first Canadian, as well as the first player born in the 2000s, to win a major singles title. She was the youngest player to win the title since Svetlana Kuznetsova in 2004, and the first woman to win the US Open on her main draw debut. This was the first time a player won a major on their debut appearance since Monica Seles won the 1991 Australian Open. In addition, Andreescu tied Seles’ Open Era record of the shortest time from major debut to winning a title, winning on her fourth major appearance (a record broken just two years later by Emma Raducanu, who won on her second major appearance). The final was a rematch of the Canadian Open final four weeks prior, also won by Andreescu. This was the largest age gap (18 years) between two women's major finalists in the Open Era. With the win, Andreescu entered the top 5 in rankings for the first time.

Naomi Osaka was the defending champion, but lost to Belinda Bencic in the fourth round.

This marked the first time that the tournament's draw included eight former champions: Osaka, Sloane Stephens, Angelique Kerber, Serena Williams, Samantha Stosur, Maria Sharapova, Kuznetsova, and Venus Williams.

In reaching her 33rd and last career major final, Serena Williams set a new record for the longest gap between a player's first and last major final appearances, her first being twenty years prior at the 1999 US Open. She also equaled the record for the most match wins at the US Open, held by Chris Evert (101 wins).

Despite losing in the fourth round, Ashleigh Barty regained the world No. 1 singles ranking from Osaka. In addition to Barty and Osaka, Karolína Plíšková and Simona Halep were also in contention for the top ranking.

This tournament marked the first US Open appearances of future 2022 and 2026 champions and world No. 1s Iga Świątek and Elena Rybakina, who lost in the second and first rounds to Anastasija Sevastova and Karolína Muchová, respectively. It was also the first US Open appearance for future 2023 champion Coco Gauff, who lost in the third round to Osaka. This tournament also marked the final US Open appearances of former world No. 1 and 2006 champion Sharapova and former world No. 2 and 2004 champion Kuznetsova. Both lost in the first round, to Serena Williams and Kristie Ahn, respectively.

== Seeds ==
Seeding per WTA rankings.

1. (Japan) Naomi Osaka (fourth round)
2. (Australia) Ashleigh Barty (fourth round)
3. (Czech Republic) Karolína Plíšková (fourth round)
4. (Romania) Simona Halep (second round)
5. (Ukraine) Elina Svitolina (semifinals)
6. (Czech Republic) Petra Kvitová (second round)
7. (Netherlands) Kiki Bertens (third round)
8. (United States) Serena Williams (final)
9. (Belarus) Aryna Sabalenka (second round)
10. (United States) Madison Keys (fourth round)
11. (United States) Sloane Stephens (first round)
12. (Latvia) Anastasija Sevastova (third round)
13. (Switzerland) Belinda Bencic (semifinals)
14. (Germany) Angelique Kerber (first round)
15. (Canada) Bianca Andreescu (champion)
16. (United Kingdom) Johanna Konta (quarterfinals)
17. (Czech Republic) Markéta Vondroušová (withdrew)

18. (China) Wang Qiang (quarterfinals)
19. (Denmark) Caroline Wozniacki (third round)
20. (United States) Sofia Kenin (third round)
21. (Estonia) Anett Kontaveit (third round, withdrew)
22. (Croatia) Petra Martić (fourth round)
23. (Croatia) Donna Vekić (quarterfinals)
24. (Spain) Garbiñe Muguruza (first round)
25. (Belgium) Elise Mertens (quarterfinals)
26. (Germany) Julia Görges (fourth round)
27. (France) Caroline Garcia (first round)
28. (Spain) Carla Suárez Navarro (first round, retired)
29. (Chinese Taipei) Hsieh Su-wei (second round)
30. (Greece) Maria Sakkari (third round)
31. (Czech Republic) Barbora Strýcová (first round)
32. (Ukraine) Dayana Yastremska (third round)
33. (China) Zhang Shuai (third round)

Click on the seed number of a player to go to their draw section.

== Draw ==
Key

- Q = Qualifier
- WC = Wild card
- LL = Lucky loser
- Alt = Alternate
- ITF = ITF entry
- PR = Protected ranking
- SR = Special ranking
- SE = Special exempt
- JE = Junior exempt
- JR = Junior Accelerator Programme entrant
- CO = College Accelerator Programme entrant
- NG = Next Gen Accelerator Program entrant
- w/o = Walkover
- r = Retired
- d = Defaulted

=== Finals ===
Quarterfinals
13	(Switzerland) Belinda Bencic	7^{7}	6
23	(Croatia) Donna Vekić	6^{5}	3
15	(Canada) Bianca Andreescu	3	6	6
25	(Belgium) Elise Mertens	6	2	3
5	(Ukraine) Elina Svitolina	6	6
16	(United Kingdom) Johanna Konta	4	4
8	(United States) Serena Williams	6	6
18	(China) Wang Qiang	1	0

Semifinals
13	(Switzerland) Belinda Bencic	6^{3}	5
15	(Canada) Bianca Andreescu	7^{7}	7
5	(Ukraine) Elina Svitolina	3	1
8	(United States) Serena Williams	6	6

Final
15	(Canada) Bianca Andreescu	6	7
8	(United States) Serena Williams	3	5

=== Top half ===
==== Section 1 ====
First round
1	(Japan) N Osaka	6	6^{5}	6
(Russia) A Blinkova	4	7^{7}	2
(Australia) A Sharma	3	4
(Poland) M Linette	6	6
(Russia) A Potapova	6	2	4
WC	(United States) C Gauff	3	6	6
Q	(Hungary) T Babos	6	0
28	(Spain) C Suárez Navarro	2	0^{r}
21	(Estonia) A Kontaveit	6	6
(Spain) S Sorribes Tormo	1	1
(Australia) A Tomljanović	1	7	6
(Czech Republic) M Bouzková	6	5	1
(France) A Cornet	6	6
(United States) J Pegula	2	3
(Luxembourg) M Minella	3	2
13	(Switzerland) B Bencic	6	6

Second round
1	(Japan) N Osaka	6	6
(Poland) M Linette	2	4
WC	(United States) C Gauff	6	4	6
Q	(Hungary) T Babos	2	6	4
21	(Estonia) A Kontaveit	4	7	6
(Australia) A Tomljanović	6	5	2
(France) A Cornet	4	6	2
13	(Switzerland) B Bencic	6	1	6

Third round
1	(Japan) N Osaka	6	6
WC	(United States) C Gauff	3	0
21	(Estonia) A Kontaveit
13	(Switzerland) B Bencic	w/o

Fourth round
1	(Japan) N Osaka	5	4
13	(Switzerland) B Bencic	7	6

==== Section 2 ====
First round
9	(Belarus) A Sabalenka	3	6	6
(Belarus) V Azarenka	6	3	4
(Kazakhstan) Y Putintseva	6	6
(United States) M Brengle	3	3
(Estonia) K Kanepi	5	7^{7}	6
(Germany) T Maria	7	6^{4}	3
Q	(Netherlands) R Hogenkamp	6^{4}	3
23	(Croatia) D Vekić	7^{7}	6
26	(Germany) J Görges	1	6	7^{7}
(Russia) N Vikhlyantseva	6	1	6^{1}
WC	(United States) F Di Lorenzo	7^{7}	6
(Russia) V Kudermetova	6^{4}	2
(France) P Parmentier	1	6^{2}
(Russia) A Pavlyuchenkova	6	7^{7}
LL	(Spain) P Badosa	4	2
7	(Netherlands) K Bertens	6	6

Second round
9	(Belarus) A Sabalenka	3	6^{3}
(Kazakhstan) Y Putintseva	6	7^{7}
(Estonia) K Kanepi	5	3
23	(Croatia) D Vekić	7	6
26	(Germany) J Görges	7	6
WC	(United States) F Di Lorenzo	5	0
(Russia) A Pavlyuchenkova	5	4
7	(Netherlands) K Bertens	7	6

Third round
(Kazakhstan) Y Putintseva	4	1
23	(Croatia) D Vekić	6	6
26	(Germany) J Görges	6	6
7	(Netherlands) K Bertens	2	3

Fourth round
23	(Croatia) D Vekić	6^{5}	7	6
26	(Germany) J Görges	7^{7}	5	3

==== Section 3 ====
First round
4	(Romania) S Halep	6	3	6
LL	(United States) N Gibbs	3	6	2
Q	(United States) T Townsend	3	6	6
(Ukraine) K Kozlova	6	3	2
(Romania) S Cîrstea	7	6
(Czech Republic) K Siniaková	5	2
(Spain) A Bolsova	6	0	6
31	(Czech Republic) B Strýcová	3	6	1
19	(Denmark) C Wozniacki	1	7	6
(China) Y Wang	6	5	3
(United States) D Collins	6	4	6
(Slovenia) P Hercog	3	6	4
LL	(China) Xiy Wang	6	2	2
LL	(Belgium) K Flipkens	3	6	6
WC	(United States) K Volynets	2	4
15	(Canada) B Andreescu	6	6

Second round
4	(Romania) S Halep	6	3	6^{4}
Q	(United States) T Townsend	2	6	7^{7}
(Romania) S Cîrstea	3	6	6
(Spain) A Bolsova	6	4	2
19	(Denmark) C Wozniacki	4	6	6
(United States) D Collins	6	3	4
LL	(Belgium) K Flipkens	3	5
15	(Canada) B Andreescu	6	7

Third round
Q	(United States) T Townsend	7	6
(Romania) S Cîrstea	5	2
19	(Denmark) C Wozniacki	4	4
15	(Canada) B Andreescu	6	6

Fourth round
Q	(United States) T Townsend	1	6	2
15	(Canada) B Andreescu	6	4	6

==== Section 4 ====
First round
11	(United States) S Stephens	3	4
Q	(Russia) A Kalinskaya	6	6
WC	(United States) K Ahn	7	6
PR	(Russia) S Kuznetsova	5	2
(Serbia) A Krunić	3	6^{7}
(Latvia) J Ostapenko	6	7^{9}
(United States) A Riske	2	6	6
24	(Spain) G Muguruza	6	1	3
25	(Belgium) E Mertens	6	6
(Switzerland) J Teichmann	2	2
(Czech Republic) Kr Plíšková	6	6
WC	(France) D Parry	4	3
(Germany) A Petkovic	6	6
(Romania) M Buzărnescu	3	4
Q	(Czech Republic) D Allertová	2	4
6	(Czech Republic) P Kvitová	6	6

Second round
Q	(Russia) A Kalinskaya	2	3
WC	(United States) K Ahn	6	6
(Latvia) J Ostapenko	6	6
(United States) A Riske	4	3
25	(Belgium) E Mertens	6	6
(Czech Republic) Kr Plíšková	2	2
(Germany) A Petkovic	6	6
6	(Czech Republic) P Kvitová	4	4

Third round
WC	(United States) K Ahn	6	7
(Latvia) J Ostapenko	3	5
25	(Belgium) E Mertens	6	6
(Germany) A Petkovic	3	3

Fourth round
WC	(United States) K Ahn	1	1
25	(Belgium) E Mertens	6	6

=== Bottom half ===
==== Section 5 ====
First round
5	(Ukraine) E Svitolina	6	7
WC	(United States) W Osuigwe	1	5
(China) S Zheng	1	0
(United States) V Williams	6	6
(Puerto Rico) M Puig	3	3
(Sweden) R Peterson	6	6
(Romania) M Niculescu	4	6	2
32	(Ukraine) D Yastremska	6	1	6
20	(United States) S Kenin	7^{7}	6
PR	(United States) C Vandeweghe	6^{4}	3
Q	(Poland) M Fręch	7	3	4
(Germany) L Siegemund	5	6	6
(China) L Zhu	6	6
Q	(China) Xin Wang	3	4
(Japan) M Doi	5	0
10	(United States) M Keys	7	6

Second round
5	(Ukraine) E Svitolina	6	6
(United States) V Williams	4	4
(Sweden) R Peterson	4	1
32	(Ukraine) D Yastremska	6	6
20	(United States) S Kenin	7^{7}	6
(Germany) L Siegemund	6^{4}	0
(China) L Zhu	4	1
10	(United States) M Keys	6	6

Third round
5	(Ukraine) E Svitolina	6	6
32	(Ukraine) D Yastremska	2	0
20	(United States) S Kenin	3	5
10	(United States) M Keys	6	7

Fourth round
5	(Ukraine) E Svitolina	7	6
10	(United States) M Keys	5	4

==== Section 6 ====
First round
16	(United Kingdom) J Konta	6	4	6
(Russia) D Kasatkina	1	6	2
(Russia) M Gasparyan	7^{7}	6
LL	(Australia) P Hon	6^{4}	4
(Russia) E Alexandrova	6	6
WC	(Australia) S Stosur	1	3
(Switzerland) V Golubic	2	1
33	(China) S Zhang	6	6
27	(France) C Garcia	6^{8}	2
(Tunisia) O Jabeur	7^{10}	6
(Belarus) A Sasnovich	6	4	6
(United States) J Brady	1	6	0
Q	(Georgia (country)) M Bolkvadze	6	5	6
(United States) B Pera	3	7	4
Q	(Czech Republic) T Martincová	6^{6}	6^{3}
3	(Czech Republic) Ka Plíšková	7^{8}	7^{7}

Second round
16	(United Kingdom) J Konta	6	6
(Russia) M Gasparyan	1	0
(Russia) E Alexandrova	6^{5}	6	3
33	(China) S Zhang	7^{7}	4	6
(Tunisia) O Jabeur	3	6	6
(Belarus) A Sasnovich	6	4	2
Q	(Georgia (country)) M Bolkvadze	1	4
3	(Czech Republic) Ka Plíšková	6	6

Third round
16	(United Kingdom) J Konta	6	6
33	(China) S Zhang	2	3
(Tunisia) O Jabeur	1	6	4
3	(Czech Republic) Ka Plíšková	6	4	6

Fourth round
16	(United Kingdom) J Konta	6^{1}	6	7
3	(Czech Republic) Ka Plíšková	7^{7}	3	5

==== Section 7 ====
First round
8	(United States) S Williams	6	6
(Russia) M Sharapova	1	1
WC	(United States) C McNally	6	6
(Switzerland) T Bacsinszky	4	1
Q	(Kazakhstan) E Rybakina	4	4
(Czech Republic) K Muchová	6	6
Q	(Slovakia) J Čepelová	4	7	3
29	(Chinese Taipei) S-w Hsieh	6	5	6
22	(Croatia) P Martić	6	4	6
(Slovenia) T Zidanšek	4	6	1
Q	(Romania) A Bogdan	6	6
Q	(United Kingdom) H Dart	3	1
(Serbia) I Jorović	0	1
(Poland) I Świątek	6	6
(Canada) E Bouchard	3	3
12	(Latvia) A Sevastova	6	6

Second round
8	(United States) S Williams	5	6	6
WC	(United States) C McNally	7	3	1
(Czech Republic) K Muchová	6	4	7^{7}
29	(Chinese Taipei) S-w Hsieh	1	6	6^{2}
22	(Croatia) P Martić	6	6
Q	(Romania) A Bogdan	2	4
(Poland) I Świątek	6	1	3
12	(Latvia) A Sevastova	3	6	6

Third round
8	(United States) S Williams	6	6
(Czech Republic) K Muchová	3	2
22	(Croatia) P Martić	6	6
12	(Latvia) A Sevastova	4	3

Fourth round
8	(United States) S Williams	6	6
22	(Croatia) P Martić	3	4

==== Section 8 ====
First round
14	(Germany) A Kerber	5	6	4
(France) K Mladenovic	7	0	6
(France) F Ferro	6	6
(Australia) D Gavrilova	3	4
(Slovakia) V Kužmová	4	4
(Belgium) A Van Uytvanck	6	6
Q	(United States) C Dolehide	4	4
18	(China) Q Wang	6	6
30	(Greece) M Sakkari	6	6
(Italy) C Giorgi	1	0
Q	(China) S Peng	6	7^{7}
LL	(United States) V Lepchenko	2	6^{5}
(United States) L Davis	7	6
Q	(Sweden) J Larsson	5	2
(Kazakhstan) Z Diyas	6	3	2
2	(Australia) A Barty	1	6	6

Second round
(France) K Mladenovic	4	7^{7}	3
(France) F Ferro	6	6^{3}	6
(Belgium) A Van Uytvanck	5	4
18	(China) Q Wang	7	6
30	(Greece) M Sakkari	6^{5}	6	6
Q	(China) S Peng	7^{7}	4	2
(United States) L Davis	2	6^{2}
2	(Australia) A Barty	6	7^{7}

Third round
(France) F Ferro	6^{1}	3
18	(China) Q Wang	7^{7}	6
30	(Greece) M Sakkari	5	3
2	(Australia) A Barty	7	6

Fourth round
18	(China) Q Wang	6	6
2	(Australia) A Barty	2	4

== Championship match ratings ==
3.219 million watched on ESPN in the US.

In Canada, preliminary data from Numeris showed a combined average audience of 3.4 million viewers on TSN and RDS, in English and French, respectively. Canadian viewership peaked at 5.3 million viewers at 5:59pm during the second set.

== Championship match statistics ==
Category	(Canada) Andreescu	(United States) S. Williams
1st serve %	45/68 (66%)	34/77 (44%)
1st serve points won	29 of 45 = 64%	25 of 34 = 74%
2nd serve points won	9 of 23 = 39%	13 of 43 = 30%
Total service points won	38 of 68 = 55.88%	38 of 77 = 49.35%
Aces	5	9
Double faults	3	8
Winners	19	33
Unforced errors	17	33
Net points won	5 of 8 = 63%	9 of 11 = 82%
Break points converted	6 of 13 = 46%	3 of 8 = 38%
Return points won	39 of 77 = 51%	30 of 68 = 44%
Total points won	77	68

Preceded by 2019 Wimbledon Championships – Women's singles	Grand Slam women's singles	Succeeded by 2020 Australian Open – Women's singles
