= 2019 US Open – Men's singles =

Men's singles
- 2019 US Open

Final
- Champion: (Spain) Rafael Nadal
- Runner-up: (Russia) Daniil Medvedev
- Score: 7–5, 6–3, 5–7, 4–6, 6–4

Details
- Draw: 128 (16Q / 8WC)
- Seeds: 32

Events
| Singles | men | women | | boys | girls |
| Doubles | men | women | mixed | boys | girls |
| WC Singles | men | women | quad |
| WC Doubles | men | women | quad |
| Legends | men | women | mixed |
- US Open

Rafael Nadal defeated Daniil Medvedev in the final, 7–5, 6–3, 5–7, 4–6, 6–4 to win the men's singles tennis title at the 2019 US Open. It was his fourth US Open title and 19th major title overall. Nadal's victory meant that every major title since the beginning of 2017 had been won by either himself (5), Novak Djokovic (4) or Roger Federer (3). This was the first time since 2006–08 that Djokovic, Federer, and Nadal had claimed all four major singles titles across three consecutive years.

Djokovic was the defending champion, but retired due to a left shoulder injury against Stan Wawrinka in the fourth round. This was the first time since 2006 that Djokovic failed to reach the US Open semifinals (not counting the 2017 tournament, which he missed due to injury).

Medvedev was the second Russian player (after Marat Safin) to reach the final, and the first Russian man to reach a major final since Safin at the 2005 Australian Open. Matteo Berrettini was the first Italian man to reach the semifinals at the US Open since Corrado Barazzutti in 1977.

Grigor Dimitrov (ranked 78th) was the lowest-ranked US Open men's semifinalist since Jimmy Connors (ranked 174th) in 1991, and the lowest-ranked men's singles semifinalist at any major since Rainer Schüttler (ranked 92nd) at the 2008 Wimbledon Championships. This was the first time in the Open Era that four quarterfinalists (Federer, Nadal, Wawrinka and Gaël Monfils) were 33 years old or older.

This marked the first major main-draw appearance for future major champion and world No. 1 Jannik Sinner; he lost to Wawrinka in the first round. This was the final US Open appearance of five-time champion Federer; he lost in the quarterfinals to Dimitrov. This was also the final professional appearance of former world No. 4 and 2010 Wimbledon finalist Tomáš Berdych, who lost in the first round to Jenson Brooksby.

== Seeds ==
All seedings per ATP rankings.

1. (Serbia) Novak Djokovic (fourth round, retired)
2. (Spain) Rafael Nadal (champion)
3. (Switzerland) Roger Federer (quarterfinals)
4. (Austria) Dominic Thiem (first round)
5. (Russia) Daniil Medvedev (final)
6. (Germany) Alexander Zverev (fourth round)
7. (Japan) Kei Nishikori (third round)
8. (Greece) Stefanos Tsitsipas (first round)
9. (Russia) Karen Khachanov (first round)
10. (Spain) Roberto Bautista Agut (first round)
11. (Italy) Fabio Fognini (first round)
12. (Croatia) Borna Ćorić (second round, withdrew)
13. (France) Gaël Monfils (quarterfinals)
14. (United States) John Isner (third round)
15. (Belgium) David Goffin (fourth round)
16. (South Africa) Kevin Anderson (withdrew)

17. (Georgia (country)) Nikoloz Basilashvili (third round)
18. (Canada) Félix Auger-Aliassime (first round)
19. (Argentina) Guido Pella (first round)
20. (Argentina) Diego Schwartzman (quarterfinals)
21. (Canada) Milos Raonic (withdrew)
22. (Croatia) Marin Čilić (fourth round)
23. (Switzerland) Stan Wawrinka (quarterfinals)
24. (Italy) Matteo Berrettini (semifinals)
25. (France) Lucas Pouille (second round)
26. (United States) Taylor Fritz (first round)
27. (Serbia) Dušan Lajović (second round)
28. (Australia) Nick Kyrgios (third round)
29. (France) Benoît Paire (second round)
30. (United Kingdom) Kyle Edmund (first round)
31. (Chile) Cristian Garín (second round)
32. (Spain) Fernando Verdasco (second round)

Click on the seed number of a player to go to their draw section.

== Draw ==
Key

- Q = Qualifier
- WC = Wild card
- LL = Lucky loser
- Alt = Alternate
- ITF = ITF entry
- PR = Protected ranking
- SR = Special ranking
- SE = Special exempt
- JE = Junior exempt
- JR = Junior Accelerator Programme entrant
- CO = College Accelerator Programme entrant
- NG = Next Gen Accelerator Program entrant
- w/o = Walkover
- r = Retired
- d = Defaulted

=== Finals ===
Quarterfinals
23 | (Switzerland) Stan Wawrinka | 6^{6} | 3 | 6 | 1
5 | (Russia) Daniil Medvedev | 7^{8} | 6 | 3 | 6
3 | (Switzerland) Roger Federer | 6 | 4 | 6 | 4 | 2
(Bulgaria) Grigor Dimitrov | 3 | 6 | 3 | 6 | 6
24 | (Italy) Matteo Berrettini | 3 | 6 | 6 | 3 | 7^{7}
13 | (France) Gaël Monfils | 6 | 3 | 2 | 6 | 6^{5}
20 | (Argentina) Diego Schwartzman | 4 | 5 | 2
2 | (Spain) Rafael Nadal | 6 | 7 | 6

Semifinals
5 | (Russia) Daniil Medvedev | 7^{7} | 6 | 6
(Bulgaria) Grigor Dimitrov | 6^{5} | 4 | 3
24 | (Italy) Matteo Berrettini | 6^{6} | 4 | 1
2 | (Spain) Rafael Nadal | 7^{8} | 6 | 6

Final
5 | (Russia) Daniil Medvedev | 5 | 3 | 7 | 6 | 4
2 | (Spain) Rafael Nadal | 7 | 6 | 5 | 4 | 6

=== Top half ===
==== Section 1 ====
First round
1 | (Serbia) N Djokovic | 6 | 6 | 6
(Spain) R Carballés Baena | 4 | 1 | 4
(United States) S Querrey | 6 | 1 | 6^{3} | 5
(Argentina) JI Londero | 3 | 6 | 7^{7} | 7
(United States) D Kudla | 3 | 6 | 7^{7} | 6
PR | (Serbia) J Tipsarević | 6 | 1 | 6^{5} | 1
PR | (Belgium) S Darcis | 5 | 3 | 3
27 | (Serbia) D Lajović | 7 | 6 | 6
23 | (Switzerland) S Wawrinka | 6 | 7^{7} | 4 | 6
Q | (Italy) J Sinner | 3 | 6^{4} | 6 | 3
(Poland) H Hurkacz | 6 | 3 | 7^{8} | 1 | 4
(France) J Chardy | 3 | 6 | 6^{6} | 6 | 6
(Serbia) L Đere | 2 | 1 | 5
(Serbia) M Kecmanović | 6 | 6 | 7
WC | (United States) Z Svajda | 6 | 7^{7} | 4 | 6^{4} | 2
LL | (Italy) P Lorenzi | 3 | 6^{5} | 6 | 7^{7} | 6

Second round
1 | (Serbia) N Djokovic | 6 | 7^{7} | 6
(Argentina) JI Londero | 4 | 6^{3} | 1
(United States) D Kudla | 7 | 7 | 0 | 6
27 | (Serbia) D Lajović | 5 | 5 | 6 | 3
23 | (Switzerland) S Wawrinka | 6 | 6 | 6^{3} | 6
(France) J Chardy | 4 | 3 | 7^{7} | 3
(Serbia) M Kecmanović | 6^{11} | 7^{7} | 6^{2} | 6 | 3
LL | (Italy) P Lorenzi | 7^{13} | 6^{2} | 7^{7} | 3 | 6

Third round
1 | (Serbia) N Djokovic | 6 | 6 | 6
(United States) D Kudla | 3 | 4 | 2
23 | (Switzerland) S Wawrinka | 6 | 7^{11} | 7^{7}
LL | (Italy) P Lorenzi | 4 | 6^{9} | 6^{4}

Fourth round
1 | (Serbia) N Djokovic | 4 | 5 | 1^{r}
23 | (Switzerland) S Wawrinka | 6 | 7 | 2

==== Section 2 ====
First round
11 | (Italy) F Fognini | 3 | 4 | 7^{8} | 3
(United States) R Opelka | 6 | 6 | 6^{6} | 6
Q | (Germany) D Koepfer | 6 | 7^{7} | 5 | 7
(Spain) J Munar | 4 | 6^{2} | 7 | 5
PR | (Czech Republic) T Berdych | 1 | 6 | 4 | 4
Q | (United States) J Brooksby | 6 | 2 | 6 | 6
(Hungary) M Fucsovics | 6 | 4 | 2 | 6 | 3
17 | (Georgia (country)) N Basilashvili | 3 | 6 | 6 | 3 | 6
26 | (United States) T Fritz | 6 | 4 | 3 | 4
(Spain) F López | 3 | 6 | 6 | 6
(Japan) Y Nishioka | 3 | 6 | 6 | 6
WC | (United States) M Giron | 6 | 4 | 4 | 4
Q | (South Korea) S-w Kwon | 3 | 4 | 6 | 3^{r}
(Bolivia) H Dellien | 6 | 6 | 2 | 2
(India) P Gunneswaran | 4 | 1 | 2
5 | (Russia) D Medvedev | 6 | 6 | 6

Second round
(United States) R Opelka | 4 | 4 | 6^{2}
Q | (Germany) D Koepfer | 6 | 6 | 7^{7}
Q | (United States) J Brooksby | 6 | 6^{3} | 5 | 2
17 | (Georgia (country)) N Basilashvili | 3 | 7^{7} | 7 | 6
(Spain) F López | 6^{7} | 6 | 6 | 6
(Japan) Y Nishioka | 7^{9} | 0 | 4 | 4
(Bolivia) H Dellien | 3 | 5 | 7 | 3
5 | (Russia) D Medvedev | 6 | 7 | 5 | 6

Third round
Q | (Germany) D Koepfer | 6 | 7^{7} | 4 | 6
17 | (Georgia (country)) N Basilashvili | 3 | 6^{5} | 6 | 1
(Spain) F López | 6^{1} | 6 | 6^{7} | 4
5 | (Russia) D Medvedev | 7^{7} | 4 | 7^{9} | 6

Fourth round
Q | (Germany) D Koepfer | 6 | 3 | 2 | 6^{2}
5 | (Russia) D Medvedev | 3 | 6 | 6 | 7^{7}

==== Section 3 ====
First round
3 | (Switzerland) R Federer | 4 | 6 | 6 | 6
Q | (India) S Nagal | 6 | 1 | 2 | 4
Q | (France) E Benchetrit | 6 | 2 | 3 | 0
(Bosnia and Herzegovina) D Džumhur | 4 | 6 | 6 | 6
(France) A Mannarino | 4 | 3 | 6 | 3
(United Kingdom) D Evans | 6 | 6 | 2 | 6
(Germany) P Kohlschreiber | 3 | 6 | 4 | 4
25 | (France) L Pouille | 6 | 4 | 6 | 6
19 | (Argentina) G Pella | 3 | 6 | 6^{2} | 3
(Spain) P Carreño Busta | 6 | 4 | 7^{7} | 6
(Lithuania) R Berankis | 4 | 7^{7} | 3 | 7^{7} | 6
Q | (Czech Republic) J Veselý | 6 | 6^{4} | 6 | 6^{4} | 4
Q | (France) G Barrère | 7^{7} | 6 | 4 | 6^{5} | 7^{7}
(United Kingdom) C Norrie | 6^{4} | 4 | 6 | 7^{7} | 6^{2}
(France) C Moutet | 3 | 6 | 4 | 0
15 | (Belgium) D Goffin | 6 | 3 | 6 | 6

Second round
3 | (Switzerland) R Federer | 3 | 6 | 6 | 6
(Bosnia and Herzegovina) D Džumhur | 6 | 2 | 3 | 4
(United Kingdom) D Evans | 6 | 6 | 6^{4} | 6
25 | (France) L Pouille | 4 | 3 | 7^{7} | 4
(Spain) P Carreño Busta | 6 | 6^{3} | 6 | 6
(Lithuania) R Berankis | 4 | 7^{7} | 2 | 0
Q | (France) G Barrère | 2 | 2 | 2
15 | (Belgium) D Goffin | 6 | 6 | 6

Third round
3 | (Switzerland) R Federer | 6 | 6 | 6
(United Kingdom) D Evans | 2 | 2 | 1
(Spain) P Carreño Busta | 6^{5} | 6^{9} | 5
15 | (Belgium) D Goffin | 7^{7} | 7^{11} | 7

Fourth round
3 | (Switzerland) R Federer | 6 | 6 | 6
15 | (Belgium) D Goffin | 2 | 2 | 0

==== Section 4 ====
First round
12 | (Croatia) B Ćorić | 7^{9} | 6 | 6
Q | (Russia) E Donskoy | 6^{7} | 3 | 0
(Italy) A Seppi | 1 | 7^{7} | 4 | 3
(Bulgaria) G Dimitrov | 6 | 6^{2} | 6 | 6
WC | (United States) J Sock | 4 | 5 | 6^{5}
(Uruguay) P Cuevas | 6 | 7 | 7^{7}
(Chile) N Jarry | 7^{7} | 6^{5} | 6^{6} | 6 | 4
LL | (Poland) K Majchrzak | 6^{2} | 7^{7} | 7^{8} | 1 | 6
31 | (Chile) C Garín | 3 | 7^{7} | 6 | 6^{4} | 6
WC | (United States) C Eubanks | 6 | 6^{5} | 4 | 7^{7} | 3
(France) P-H Herbert | 4 | 2 | 7^{8} | 5
(Australia) A de Minaur | 6 | 6 | 6^{6} | 7
(Brazil) T Monteiro | 3 | 2 | 3
(United States) B Klahn | 6 | 6 | 6
Q | (Argentina) M Trungelliti | 1 | 1^{r}
7 | (Japan) K Nishikori | 6 | 4

Second round
12 | (Croatia) B Ćorić
(Bulgaria) G Dimitrov | w/o
(Uruguay) P Cuevas | 7^{7} | 4 | 6 | 4 | 1
LL | (Poland) K Majchrzak | 6^{3} | 6 | 2 | 6 | 6
31 | (Chile) C Garín | 3 | 5 | 3
(Australia) A de Minaur | 6 | 7 | 6
(United States) B Klahn | 2 | 6 | 3 | 5
7 | (Japan) K Nishikori | 6 | 4 | 6 | 7

Third round
(Bulgaria) G Dimitrov | 7 | 7^{10} | 6
LL | (Poland) K Majchrzak | 5 | 6^{8} | 2
(Australia) A de Minaur | 6 | 6 | 2 | 6
7 | (Japan) K Nishikori | 2 | 4 | 6 | 3

Fourth round
(Bulgaria) G Dimitrov | 7 | 6 | 6
(Australia) A de Minaur | 5 | 3 | 4

=== Bottom half ===
==== Section 5 ====
First round
8 | (Greece) S Tsitsipas | 4 | 7^{7} | 6^{7} | 5
(Russia) A Rublev | 6 | 6^{5} | 7^{9} | 7
WC | (United States) B Fratangelo | 7 | 5 | 5 | 5
(France) G Simon | 5 | 7 | 7 | 7
WC | (France) A Hoang | 3 | 6 | 6^{6} | 6 | 6
(Argentina) L Mayer | 6 | 2 | 7^{8} | 1 | 3
(United States) S Johnson | 3 | 6^{1} | 4
28 | (Australia) N Kyrgios | 6 | 7^{7} | 6
24 | (Italy) M Berrettini | 6 | 6 | 2 | 6
(France) R Gasquet | 4 | 3 | 6 | 2
(Portugal) J Sousa | 3 | 2 | 4
(Australia) J Thompson | 6 | 6 | 6
(Australia) A Popyrin | 6 | 7 | 7^{7}
(Argentina) F Delbonis | 1 | 5 | 6^{5}
(Kazakhstan) M Kukushkin | 3 | 6 | 6 | 3 | 6
10 | (Spain) R Bautista Agut | 6 | 1 | 4 | 6 | 3

Second round
(Russia) A Rublev | 6 | 0
(France) G Simon | 2 | 0^{r}
WC | (France) A Hoang | 4 | 2 | 4
28 | (Australia) N Kyrgios | 6 | 6 | 6
24 | (Italy) M Berrettini | 7 | 7^{7} | 4 | 6
(Australia) J Thompson | 5 | 6^{5} | 6 | 1
(Australia) A Popyrin | 2 | 7 | 6 | 6
(Kazakhstan) M Kukushkin | 6 | 5 | 3 | 2

Third round
(Russia) A Rublev | 7^{7} | 7^{7} | 6
28 | (Australia) N Kyrgios | 6^{5} | 6^{5} | 3
24 | (Italy) M Berrettini | 6 | 6 | 6^{3} | 7^{7}
(Australia) A Popyrin | 4 | 4 | 7^{7} | 6^{2}

Fourth round
(Russia) A Rublev | 1 | 4 | 6^{6}
24 | (Italy) M Berrettini | 6 | 6 | 7^{8}

==== Section 6 ====
First round
13 | (France) G Monfils | 7^{7} | 6 | 6
(Spain) A Ramos Viñolas | 6^{2} | 4 | 3
(France) U Humbert | 3 | 7 | 6^{11} | 6 | 1
(Romania) M Copil | 6 | 5 | 7^{13} | 4 | 6
(Switzerland) H Laaksonen | 7^{7} | 7^{8} | 2 | 3 | 7^{7}
(Italy) M Cecchinato | 6^{3} | 6^{6} | 6 | 6 | 6^{2}
(Canada) D Shapovalov | 6 | 6 | 6
18 | (Canada) F Auger-Aliassime | 1 | 1 | 4
30 | (United Kingdom) K Edmund | 6 | 6^{1} | 5 | 7 | 2
(Spain) P Andújar | 3 | 7^{7} | 7 | 5 | 6
(Italy) L Sonego | 6 | 6 | 6
(Spain) M Granollers | 3 | 4 | 4
(Kazakhstan) A Bublik | 2 | 6 | 7 | 3 | 6
Q | (Colombia) S Giraldo | 6 | 0 | 5 | 6 | 4
(Italy) T Fabbiano | 6 | 3 | 6 | 6
4 | (Austria) D Thiem | 4 | 6 | 3 | 2

Second round
13 | (France) G Monfils | 6 | 6 | 6
(Romania) M Copil | 3 | 2 | 2
(Switzerland) H Laaksonen | 4 | 6^{2} | 2
(Canada) D Shapovalov | 6 | 7^{7} | 6
(Spain) P Andújar | 6 | 6 | 6
(Italy) L Sonego | 2 | 4 | 2
(Kazakhstan) A Bublik | 6^{3} | 5 | 6 | 6 | 6
(Italy) T Fabbiano | 7^{7} | 7 | 4 | 3 | 3

Third round
13 | (France) G Monfils | 6^{5} | 7^{7} | 6 | 6^{6} | 6
(Canada) D Shapovalov | 7^{7} | 6^{4} | 4 | 7^{8} | 3
(Spain) P Andújar | 6 | 6 | 6
(Kazakhstan) A Bublik | 4 | 3 | 2

Fourth round
13 | (France) G Monfils | 6 | 6 | 6
(Spain) P Andújar | 1 | 2 | 2

==== Section 7 ====
First round
6 | (Germany) A Zverev | 6 | 6 | 3 | 4 | 6
(Moldova) R Albot | 1 | 3 | 6 | 6 | 2
(Croatia) I Karlović | 2 | 3 | 2^{r}
(United States) F Tiafoe | 6 | 6 | 1
PR | (Slovakia) J Kovalík | 3 | 4 | 5
(Slovenia) A Bedene | 6 | 6 | 7
(Canada) B Schnur | 2 | 4 | 4
29 | (France) B Paire | 6 | 6 | 6
20 | (Argentina) D Schwartzman | 6 | 7^{8} | 6
(Netherlands) R Haase | 3 | 6^{6} | 0
(South Africa) L Harris | 5 | 6^{5} | 6^{3}
Q | (Belarus) E Gerasimov | 7 | 7^{7} | 7^{7}
(France) J-W Tsonga | 6 | 7^{7} | 4 | 6^{5} | 5
(United States) T Sandgren | 1 | 6^{2} | 6 | 7^{7} | 7
PR | (Canada) V Pospisil | 4 | 7 | 7 | 4 | 6
9 | (Russia) K Khachanov | 6 | 5 | 5 | 6 | 3

Second round
6 | (Germany) A Zverev | 6 | 3 | 6 | 2 | 6
(United States) F Tiafoe | 3 | 6 | 2 | 6 | 3
(Slovenia) A Bedene | 4 | 6^{3} | 6 | 7 | 7^{7}
29 | (France) B Paire | 6 | 7^{7} | 2 | 5 | 6^{4}
20 | (Argentina) D Schwartzman | 6 | 6 | 6
Q | (Belarus) E Gerasimov | 4 | 2 | 0
(United States) T Sandgren | 6 | 6^{4} | 6 | 6
PR | (Canada) V Pospisil | 3 | 7^{7} | 3 | 4

Third round
6 | (Germany) A Zverev | 6^{4} | 7^{7} | 6 | 7^{7}
(Slovenia) A Bedene | 7^{7} | 6^{4} | 3 | 6^{3}
20 | (Argentina) D Schwartzman | 6 | 6 | 6
(United States) T Sandgren | 4 | 1 | 3

Fourth round
6 | (Germany) A Zverev | 6 | 2 | 4 | 3
20 | (Argentina) D Schwartzman | 3 | 6 | 6 | 6

==== Section 8 ====
First round
14 | (United States) J Isner | 6 | 6 | 6
Q | (Spain) G García López | 3 | 4 | 4
(Germany) J-L Struff | 6 | 6 | 6
(Norway) C Ruud | 4 | 4 | 2
(Serbia) F Krajinović | 3 | 6 | 4 | 6^{6}
PR | (Germany) C-M Stebe | 6 | 4 | 6 | 7^{8}
(Slovakia) M Kližan | 3 | 2 | 6^{6}
22 | (Croatia) M Čilić | 6 | 6 | 7^{8}
32 | (Spain) F Verdasco | 6 | 3 | 6 | 6
Q | (Germany) T Kamke | 3 | 6 | 1 | 2
Q | (South Korea) H Chung | 3 | 6 | 6^{5} | 6 | 6
WC | (United States) E Escobedo | 6 | 4 | 7^{7} | 4 | 2
WC | (Australia) T Kokkinakis | 6 | 7^{10} | 6^{4} | 6
Q | (Belarus) I Ivashka | 3 | 6^{8} | 7^{7} | 2
(Australia) J Millman | 3 | 2 | 2
2 | (Spain) R Nadal | 6 | 6 | 6

Second round
14 | (United States) J Isner | 6 | 7^{7} | 7^{7}
(Germany) J-L Struff | 3 | 6^{4} | 6^{5}
PR | (Germany) C-M Stebe | 6 | 3 | 5 | 3
22 | (Croatia) M Čilić | 4 | 6 | 7 | 6
32 | (Spain) F Verdasco | 6 | 6 | 5 | 3 | 6^{3}
Q | (South Korea) H Chung | 1 | 2 | 7 | 6 | 7^{7}
WC | (Australia) T Kokkinakis
2 | (Spain) R Nadal | w/o

Third round
14 | (United States) J Isner | 5 | 6 | 6^{6} | 4
22 | (Croatia) M Čilić | 7 | 3 | 7^{8} | 6
Q | (South Korea) H Chung | 3 | 4 | 2
2 | (Spain) R Nadal | 6 | 6 | 6

Fourth round
22 | (Croatia) M Čilić | 3 | 6 | 1 | 2
2 | (Spain) R Nadal | 6 | 3 | 6 | 6

== Championship match ratings ==
2.751 million viewers on ESPN, in the United States.

| Preceded by 2019 Wimbledon Championships – Men's singles | Grand Slam men's singles | Succeeded by 2020 Australian Open – Men's singles |
