= 2022 Australian Open – Men's singles qualifying =

Men's singles qualifying
- 2022 Australian Open

Events
Singles	men	women		boys	girls
Doubles	men	women	mixed	boys	girls
WC Singles	men	women	quad	boys	girls
WC Doubles	men	women	quad	boys	girls

Qualification
Singles	men	women
- Australian Open

This article displays the qualifying draw for men's singles at the 2022 Australian Open.

== Seeds ==
1. (Slovakia) Andrej Martin (first round)
2. (Slovakia) Norbert Gombos (qualified)
3. (Colombia) Daniel Elahi Galán (first round)
4. (France) Gilles Simon (first round)
5. (Moldova) Radu Albot (qualified)
6. (Spain) Bernabé Zapata Miralles (first round)
7. (Japan) Taro Daniel (qualified)
8. (Germany) Yannick Hanfmann (qualified)
9. (Argentina) Francisco Cerúndolo (first round)
10. (United Kingdom) Liam Broady (qualified)
11. (Peru) Juan Pablo Varillas (second round)
12. (Argentina) Tomás Martín Etcheverry (qualified)
13. (Brazil) Thiago Seyboth Wild (first round, retired)
14. (Austria) Jurij Rodionov (second round)
15. (Serbia) Nikola Milojević (qualified)
16. (Chile) Alejandro Tabilo (qualified)
17. (Portugal) João Sousa (qualifying competition, lucky loser)
18. (Czech Republic) Jiří Lehečka (qualified)
19. (Czech Republic) Zdeněk Kolář (second round)
20. (Czech Republic) Tomáš Macháč (qualified)
21. (Turkey) Cem İlkel (first round)
22. (Chile) Tomás Barrios Vera (qualified)
23. (Ecuador) Emilio Gómez (qualified)
24. (Slovakia) Jozef Kovalík (first round)
25. (France) Hugo Grenier (first round)
26. (France) Quentin Halys (second round)
27. (Germany) Mats Moraing (first round)
28. (Italy) Federico Gaio (first round)
29. (Italy) Salvatore Caruso (qualifying competition, lucky loser)
30. (Bosnia and Herzegovina) Damir Džumhur (qualifying competition, lucky loser)
31. (United States) Christopher Eubanks (second round)
32. (Turkey) Altuğ Çelikbilek (first round)

== Qualifiers ==
1. (Kazakhstan) Mikhail Kukushkin
2. (Slovakia) Norbert Gombos
3. (Germany) Maximilian Marterer
4. (Czech Republic) Tomáš Macháč
5. (Moldova) Radu Albot
6. (Czech Republic) Jiří Lehečka
7. (Japan) Taro Daniel
8. (Germany) Yannick Hanfmann
9. (Argentina) Marco Trungelliti
10. (United Kingdom) Liam Broady
11. (Kazakhstan) Timofey Skatov
12. (Argentina) Tomás Martín Etcheverry
13. (Ecuador) Emilio Gómez
14. (Chile) Tomás Barrios Vera
15. (Serbia) Nikola Milojević
16. (Chile) Alejandro Tabilo

== Lucky losers ==
1. (Portugal) João Sousa
2. (United States) Ernesto Escobedo
3. (Italy) Salvatore Caruso
4. (Bosnia and Herzegovina) Damir Džumhur
5. (Russia) Roman Safiullin

== Draw ==
=== First qualifier ===
First round
1	(Slovakia) Andrej Martin	0	6	5
(Netherlands) Robin Haase	6	4	7
(Bosnia and Herzegovina) Mirza Bašić	2	3
(Kazakhstan) Mikhail Kukushkin	6	6
(Belgium) Ruben Bemelmans	2	6^{6}
Alt	(Italy) Andrea Vavassori	6	7^{8}
(United States) Ernesto Escobedo	6	6
32	(Turkey) Altuğ Çelikbilek	4	4

Second round
(Netherlands) Robin Haase	5	6^{2}
(Kazakhstan) Mikhail Kukushkin	7	7^{7}
Alt	(Italy) Andrea Vavassori	6^{3}	4
(United States) Ernesto Escobedo	7^{7}	6

Qualifying competition
(Kazakhstan) Mikhail Kukushkin	6	5	7
(United States) Ernesto Escobedo	4	7	5

=== Second qualifier ===
First round
2	(Slovakia) Norbert Gombos	7	6^{4}	6
(Russia) Andrey Kuznetsov	5	7^{7}	2
(Argentina) Renzo Olivo	6	6
(United States) Bjorn Fratangelo	2	4
(Switzerland) Dominic Stricker	3	6	6
(Egypt) Mohamed Safwat	6	2	1
(Australia) Matthew Ebden	4	6	6
27	(Germany) Mats Moraing	6	2	1

Second round
2	(Slovakia) Norbert Gombos	6	3	7^{10}
(Argentina) Renzo Olivo	0	6	6^{6}
(Switzerland) Dominic Stricker	6^{2}	2
(Australia) Matthew Ebden	7^{7}	6

Qualifying competition
2	(Slovakia) Norbert Gombos	6^{3}	7^{7}	7^{10}
(Australia) Matthew Ebden	7^{7}	6^{5}	6^{8}

=== Third qualifier ===
First round
3	(Colombia) Daniel Elahi Galán	4	4
(India) Prajnesh Gunneswaran	6	6
(Germany) Maximilian Marterer	3	6	6
(Croatia) Nino Serdarušić	6	1	4
(Bulgaria) Dimitar Kuzmanov	4	6	7^{10}
(Germany) Daniel Masur	6	3	6^{5}
(Germany) Tobias Kamke	6	6
28	(Italy) Federico Gaio	4	2

Second round
(India) Prajnesh Gunneswaran	2	6^{8}
(Germany) Maximilian Marterer	6	7^{10}
(Bulgaria) Dimitar Kuzmanov	5	4
(Germany) Tobias Kamke	7	6

Qualifying competition
(Germany) Maximilian Marterer	6	6
(Germany) Tobias Kamke	4	1

=== Fourth qualifier ===
First round
4	(France) Gilles Simon	3	6	3
WC	(Australia) Edward Winter	6	1	6
(Netherlands) Jesper de Jong	5	6	6
WC	(Australia) Akira Santillan	7	4	3
(Portugal) João Domingues	4	2
PR	(India) Yuki Bhambri	6	6
(Argentina) Camilo Ugo Carabelli	6	3	1
20	(Czech Republic) Tomáš Macháč	2	6	6

Second round
WC	(Australia) Edward Winter	1	2
(Netherlands) Jesper de Jong	6	6
PR	(India) Yuki Bhambri	1	3
20	(Czech Republic) Tomáš Macháč	6	6

Qualifying competition
(Netherlands) Jesper de Jong	2	3
20	(Czech Republic) Tomáš Macháč	6	6

=== Fifth qualifier ===
First round
5	(Moldova) Radu Albot	7^{8}	6
PR	(Italy) Filippo Baldi	6^{6}	2
(Ukraine) Illya Marchenko	4	6	1
(Japan) Yosuke Watanuki	6	4	6
(Australia) Marc Polmans	7^{7}	6
(France) Geoffrey Blancaneaux	6^{3}	2
(France) Manuel Guinard	3	2
17	(Portugal) João Sousa	6	6

Second round
5	(Moldova) Radu Albot	6	2	6
(Japan) Yosuke Watanuki	1	6	2
(Australia) Marc Polmans	6	0	4
17	(Portugal) João Sousa	3	6	6

Qualifying competition
5	(Moldova) Radu Albot	6	6
17	(Portugal) João Sousa	4	4

=== Sixth qualifier ===
First round
6	(Spain) Bernabé Zapata Miralles	1	5
(Kazakhstan) Dmitry Popko	6	7
WC	(Australia) Philip Sekulic	6	6
(Germany) Matthias Bachinger	4	3
(Australia) Max Purcell	6	6
(Russia) Evgeny Donskoy	4	2
(United States) Michael Mmoh	3	4
18	(Czech Republic) Jiří Lehečka	6	6

Second round
(Kazakhstan) Dmitry Popko	6	6
WC	(Australia) Philip Sekulic	4	2
(Australia) Max Purcell	6^{2}	6^{8}
18	(Czech Republic) Jiří Lehečka	7^{7}	7^{10}

Qualifying competition
(Kazakhstan) Dmitry Popko	6	3	3
18	(Czech Republic) Jiří Lehečka	4	6	6

=== Seventh qualifier ===
First round
7	(Japan) Taro Daniel	6	6
(Italy) Andrea Arnaboldi	3	3
(India) Ramkumar Ramanathan	3	5
(Italy) Gian Marco Moroni	6	7
(Brazil) Felipe Meligeni Alves	4	4
(Argentina) Juan Pablo Ficovich	6	6
(Slovenia) Blaž Rola	6	1	6^{5}
29	(Italy) Salvatore Caruso	3	6	7^{10}

Second round
7	(Japan) Taro Daniel	6	6
(Italy) Gian Marco Moroni	3	1
(Argentina) Juan Pablo Ficovich	5	6^{5}
29	(Italy) Salvatore Caruso	7	7^{7}

Qualifying competition
7	(Japan) Taro Daniel	6	6
29	(Italy) Salvatore Caruso	4	3

=== Eighth qualifier ===
First round
8	(Germany) Yannick Hanfmann	6^{5}	7	6
(Chinese Taipei) Jason Jung	7^{7}	5	0
(Netherlands) Tim van Rijthoven	6	6
(Argentina) Facundo Mena	4	3
(Switzerland) Marc-Andrea Hüsler	4	6	3
(Italy) Alessandro Giannessi	6	3	6
WC	(France) Harold Mayot	4	1
26	(France) Quentin Halys	6	6

Second round
8	(Germany) Yannick Hanfmann	7^{10}	7^{7}
(Netherlands) Tim van Rijthoven	6^{8}	6^{3}
(Italy) Alessandro Giannessi	3	6	7^{12}
26	(France) Quentin Halys	6	3	6^{10}

Qualifying competition
8	(Germany) Yannick Hanfmann	7^{7}	7^{8}
(Italy) Alessandro Giannessi	6^{3}	6^{6}

=== Ninth qualifier ===
First round
9	(Argentina) Francisco Cerúndolo	7^{7}	4	2
(Argentina) Pedro Cachin	6^{5}	6	6
(Argentina) Marco Trungelliti	6	6
(Slovakia) Lukáš Lacko	3	4
(France) Mathias Bourgue	3	4
WC	(Australia) Rinky Hijikata	6	6
WC	(Australia) Li Tu	1	3
30	(Bosnia and Herzegovina) Damir Džumhur	6	6

Second round
(Argentina) Pedro Cachin	5	4
(Argentina) Marco Trungelliti	7	6
WC	(Australia) Rinky Hijikata	4	1^{r}
30	(Bosnia and Herzegovina) Damir Džumhur	6	2

Qualifying competition
(Argentina) Marco Trungelliti	6	2	7
30	(Bosnia and Herzegovina) Damir Džumhur	2	6	5

=== Tenth qualifier ===
First round
10	(United Kingdom) Liam Broady	4	6	6
(Poland) Kacper Żuk	6	1	2
(United States) J. J. Wolf	6	6
(Ukraine) Sergiy Stakhovsky	3	4
(Australia) Bernard Tomic	1	4
(Russia) Roman Safiullin	6	6
WC	(Australia) Tristan Schoolkate	3	4
31	(United States) Christopher Eubanks	6	6

Second round
10	(United Kingdom) Liam Broady	3	6	6
(United States) J. J. Wolf	6	4	4
(Russia) Roman Safiullin	6	1	6
31	(United States) Christopher Eubanks	4	6	1

Qualifying competition
10	(United Kingdom) Liam Broady	4	7^{7}	6
(Russia) Roman Safiullin	6	6^{2}	2

=== Eleventh qualifier ===
First round
11	(Peru) Juan Pablo Varillas	7	7^{8}
(Japan) Yasutaka Uchiyama	5	6^{6}
(Latvia) Ernests Gulbis	7^{7}	2	1^{r}
(Portugal) Gastão Elias	6^{5}	6	3
(France) Grégoire Barrère	5	3
WC	(Australia) Dane Sweeny	7	6
(Kazakhstan) Timofey Skatov	6	6
25	(France) Hugo Grenier	3	2

Second round
11	(Peru) Juan Pablo Varillas	6^{7}	6	4
(Portugal) Gastão Elias	7^{9}	4	6
WC	(Australia) Dane Sweeny	4	2
(Kazakhstan) Timofey Skatov	6	6

Qualifying competition
(Portugal) Gastão Elias	4	6^{5}
(Kazakhstan) Timofey Skatov	6	7^{7}

=== Twelfth qualifier ===
First round
12	(Argentina) Tomás Martín Etcheverry	2	6	6
(Belgium) Kimmer Coppejans	6	4	1
(Italy) Lorenzo Giustino	6	4	0
(Australia) Jason Kubler	3	6	6
(Italy) Flavio Cobolli	7^{7}	4	6
PR	(Australia) Andrew Harris	6^{3}	6	3
(Argentina) Andrea Collarini	6^{7}	2
19	(Czech Republic) Zdeněk Kolář	7^{9}	6

Second round
12	(Argentina) Tomás Martín Etcheverry	7	5	6
(Australia) Jason Kubler	5	7	3
(Italy) Flavio Cobolli	6	6
19	(Czech Republic) Zdeněk Kolář	4	2

Qualifying competition
12	(Argentina) Tomás Martín Etcheverry	6	6
(Italy) Flavio Cobolli	3	2

=== Thirteenth qualifier ===
First round
13	(Brazil) Thiago Seyboth Wild	7^{9}	5	1^{r}
(Italy) Thomas Fabbiano	6^{7}	7	3
(Portugal) Frederico Ferreira Silva	2	7^{7}	6
(Japan) Go Soeda	6	6^{5}	2
(United States) Ulises Blanch	1	2
(United States) Mitchell Krueger	6	6
(Germany) Nicola Kuhn	4	4
23	(Ecuador) Emilio Gómez	6	6

Second round
(Italy) Thomas Fabbiano	6	7
(Portugal) Frederico Ferreira Silva	2	5
(United States) Mitchell Krueger	3	5
23	(Ecuador) Emilio Gómez	6	7

Qualifying competition
(Italy) Thomas Fabbiano	5	6	3
23	(Ecuador) Emilio Gómez	7	4	6

=== Fourteenth qualifier ===
First round
14	(Austria) Jurij Rodionov	7^{7}	6
(France) Maxime Janvier	6^{3}	4
(Slovakia) Filip Horanský	1
(Denmark) Mikael Torpegaard	0^{r}
(Canada) Brayden Schnur	4	6	4
(Argentina) Thiago Agustín Tirante	6	1	6
(France) Alexandre Müller	3	5
22	(Chile) Tomás Barrios Vera	6	7

Second round
14	(Austria) Jurij Rodionov	6^{5}	6	5
(Slovakia) Filip Horanský	7^{7}	4	7
(Argentina) Thiago Agustín Tirante	4	6^{1}
22	(Chile) Tomás Barrios Vera	6	7^{7}

Qualifying competition
(Slovakia) Filip Horanský	5	4
22	(Chile) Tomás Barrios Vera	7	6

=== Fifteenth qualifier ===
First round
15	(Serbia) Nikola Milojević	6	5	6
(Argentina) Nicolás Kicker	4	7	2
(Belgium) Zizou Bergs	6	6^{5}	3^{r}
(Ukraine) Vitaliy Sachko	3	7^{7}	2
(Czech Republic) Vít Kopřiva	4	7^{7}	6
(Italy) Franco Agamenone	6	6^{3}	3
(France) Enzo Couacaud	6	6^{4}	6
21	(Turkey) Cem İlkel	3	7^{7}	4

Second round
15	(Serbia) Nikola Milojević	6	7^{7}
(Ukraine) Vitaliy Sachko	3	6^{4}
(Czech Republic) Vít Kopřiva	3	3
(France) Enzo Couacaud	6	6

Qualifying competition
15	(Serbia) Nikola Milojević	7^{8}	7^{7}
(France) Enzo Couacaud	6^{6}	6^{3}

=== Sixteenth qualifier ===
First round
16	(Chile) Alejandro Tabilo	7^{7}	3	6
WC	(Australia) James McCabe	6^{5}	6	3
(Italy) Andrea Pellegrino	6	1	2
(France) Constant Lestienne	2	6	6
(Spain) Mario Vilella Martínez	6	6
PR	(Israel) Dudi Sela	3	2
(Sweden) Elias Ymer	7^{7}	6
24	(Slovakia) Jozef Kovalík	6^{3}	2

Second round
16	(Chile) Alejandro Tabilo	6	7
(France) Constant Lestienne	1	5
(Spain) Mario Vilella Martínez	6	4	6^{0}
(Sweden) Elias Ymer	4	6	7^{10}

Qualifying competition
16	(Chile) Alejandro Tabilo	6	6
(Sweden) Elias Ymer	1	2
