= 2022 Australian Open – Boys' singles =

Boys' singles
- 2022 Australian Open

Final
- Champion: (United States) Bruno Kuzuhara
- Runner-up: (Czech Republic) Jakub Menšík
- Score: 7–6^{(7–4)}, 6–7^{(6–8)}, 7–5

Events
Singles	men	women		boys	girls
Doubles	men	women	mixed	boys	girls
WC Singles	men	women	quad	boys	girls
WC Doubles	men	women	quad	boys	girls
- Australian Open

Bruno Kuzuhara won the boys' singles title at the 2022 Australian Open, defeating Jakub Menšík in the final, 7–6^{(7–4)}, 6–7^{(6–8)}, 7–5.

Harold Mayot was the defending champion but was no longer eligible to participate in junior events. He competed as a wildcard in the men's singles qualifying event, where he was defeated in the first round by Quentin Halys.

== Seeds ==
1. (United States) Bruno Kuzuhara (champion)
2. (Croatia) Mili Poljičak (third round)
3. (Paraguay) Adolfo Daniel Vallejo (semifinals)
4. (Czech Republic) Jakub Menšík (final)
5. (Peru) Ignacio Buse (first round)
6. (France) Gabriel Debru (first round)
7. (Lithuania) Edas Butvilas (quarterfinals)
8. (Poland) Olaf Pieczkowski (second round)

9. (Mexico) Rodrigo Pacheco Méndez (quarterfinals)
10. (North Macedonia) Kalin Ivanovski (first round)
11. (Switzerland) Kilian Feldbausch (semifinals)
12. (Hong Kong) Coleman Wong (third round)
13. (United States) Ozan Colak (quarterfinals)
14. (Croatia) Dino Prižmić (third round)
15. (Slovenia) Bor Artnak (first round)
16. (Argentina) Lautaro Midón (third round)

Click on the seed number of a player to go to their draw section.

== Draw ==
Key

- Q = Qualifier
- WC = Wild card
- LL = Lucky loser
- Alt = Alternate
- ITF = ITF entry
- PR = Protected ranking
- SR = Special ranking
- SE = Special exempt
- JE = Junior exempt
- JR = Junior Accelerator Programme entrant
- CO = College Accelerator Programme entrant
- NG = Next Gen Accelerator Program entrant
- w/o = Walkover
- r = Retired
- d = Defaulted

=== Finals ===
Quarterfinals
1	(United States) Bruno Kuzuhara	3	7^{7}	6
7	(Lithuania) Edas Butvilas	6	6^{3}	4
3	(Paraguay) Adolfo Daniel Vallejo	7	6
9	(Mexico) Rodrigo Pacheco Méndez	5	3
(Russia) Yaroslav Demin	0	1
4	(Czech Republic) Jakub Menšík	6	6
11	(Switzerland) Kilian Feldbausch	2	7^{7}	6
13	(United States) Ozan Colak	6	6^{0}	4

Semifinals
1	(United States) Bruno Kuzuhara	7^{7}	6
3	(Paraguay) Adolfo Daniel Vallejo	6^{2}	3
4	(Czech Republic) Jakub Menšík	6	4	6
11	(Switzerland) Kilian Feldbausch	1	6	2

Final
1	(United States) Bruno Kuzuhara	7^{7}	6^{6}	7
4	(Czech Republic) Jakub Menšík	6^{4}	7^{8}	5

=== Top half ===
==== Section 1 ====
First round
1	(United States) Bruno Kuzuhara	6	6
(Italy) Daniele Minighini	2	2
WC	(Australia) Edward Winter	4	6	6
(Russia) Konstantin Zhzhenov	6	3	3
(Czech Republic) Vojtěch Petr	6	6^{10}	1
(Belgium) Alessio Basile	2	7^{12}	6
(Croatia) Luka Mikrut	3	6	5
16	(Argentina) Lautaro Midón	6	3	7
12	(Hong Kong) Coleman Wong	6	6
WC	(Australia) Amor Jasika	0	2
(Czech Republic) Hynek Bartoň	6	6^{10}	2
(Turkey) Togan Tokaç	4	7^{12}	6
WC	(Kazakhstan) Max Batyutenko	6	6
(United Kingdom) Matthew Rankin	4	3
(France) Arthur Géa	7^{7}	5	6^{2}
7	(Lithuania) Edas Butvilas	6^{5}	7	7^{10}

Second round
1	(United States) B Kuzuhara	7	6
WC	(Australia) E Winter	5	1
(Belgium) A Basile	2	1
16	(Argentina) L Midón	6	6
12	(Hong Kong) C Wong	6	6
(Turkey) T Tokaç	2	2
WC	(Kazakhstan) M Batyutenko	6^{5}	3
7	(Lithuania) E Butvilas	7^{7}	6

Third round
1	(United States) B Kuzuhara	6	6
16	(Argentina) L Midón	4	1
12	(Hong Kong) C Wong	6^{4}	1
7	(Lithuania) E Butvilas	7^{7}	6

Quarterfinals
1	(United States) B Kuzuhara	3	7^{7}	6
7	(Lithuania) E Butvilas	6	6^{3}	4

==== Section 2 ====
First round
3	(Paraguay) Adolfo Daniel Vallejo	6	5	6
Q	(Japan) Asahi Harazaki	4	7	3
(South Korea) Shin Woo-bin	6	6
Q	(United States) Rohan Murali	0	2
(Italy) Peter Buldorini	1	4
(Poland) Borys Zgoła	6	6
WC	(Australia) Alec Braund	1	1
14	(Croatia) Dino Prižmić	6	6
9	(Mexico) Rodrigo Pacheco Méndez	6	6
(United States) Leanid Boika	4	1
WC	(Australia) Cooper Errey	5	6^{4}
(Canada) Jaden Weekes	7	7^{7}
(Germany) Liam Gavrielides	6^{4}	3
(Czech Republic) Jakub Nicod	7^{7}	6
(Switzerland) Dylan Dietrich	7	6
5	(Peru) Ignacio Buse	5	3

Second round
3	(Paraguay) AD Vallejo	6	7^{7}
(South Korea) W-b Shin	3	6^{4}
(Poland) B Zgoła	1	4
14	(Croatia) D Prižmić	6	6
9	(Mexico) R Pacheco Méndez	7	6
(Canada) J Weekes	5	2
(Czech Republic) J Nicod	6	6
(Switzerland) D Dietrich	1	3

Third round
3	(Paraguay) AD Vallejo	6	6
14	(Croatia) D Prižmić	2	2
9	(Mexico) R Pacheco Méndez	7	6
(Czech Republic) J Nicod	5	3

Quarterfinals
3	(Paraguay) AD Vallejo	7	6
9	(Mexico) R Pacheco Méndez	5	3

=== Bottom half ===
==== Section 3 ====
First round
8	(Poland) Olaf Pieczkowski	6	6
(France) Antoine Ghibaudo	3	4
Q	(United Kingdom) Louis Bowden	6	2	2
(United States) Yannik Rahman	2	6	6
(Belgium) Gilles-Arnaud Bailly	7^{7}	6
WC	(Australia) Charlie Camus	6^{2}	4
(Russia) Yaroslav Demin	7^{7}	7
10	(North Macedonia) Kalin Ivanovski	6^{3}	5
15	(Slovenia) Bor Artnak	3	7^{8}	4
WC	(Australia) Hayden Jones	6	6^{6}	6
Q	(Netherlands) Daniël Verbeek	6	4	4
(Thailand) Tanapatt Nirundorn	3	6	6
(South Korea) Gerard Campaña Lee	3	2
(United States) Aidan Kim	6	6
(Austria) Jan Kobierski	2	4
4	(Czech Republic) Jakub Menšík	6	6

Second round
8	(Poland) O Pieczkowski	3	6	1
(United States) Y Rahman	6	3	6
(Belgium) G-A Bailly	7^{7}	0	3
(Russia) Y Demin	6^{5}	6	6
WC	(Australia) H Jones	6	6
(Thailand) T Nirundorn	2	2
(United States) A Kim	6	3	4
4	(Czech Republic) J Menšík	3	6	6

Third round
(United States) Y Rahman	3	1
(Russia) Y Demin	6	6
WC	(Australia) H Jones	2	4
4	(Czech Republic) J Menšík	6	6

Quarterfinals
(Russia) Y Demin	0	1
4	(Czech Republic) J Menšík	6	6

==== Section 4 ====
First round
6	(France) Gabriel Debru	4	6	4
(Cyprus) Constantinos Koshis	6	4	6
Q	(New Zealand) Jack Loutit	2	6	1
WC	(Australia) Jeremy Jin	6	2	6
(Japan) Lennon Roark Jones	7^{11}	6
(Namibia) Connor Henry van Schalkwyk	6^{9}	2
Q	(United States) Quang Duong	0	3
11	(Switzerland) Kilian Feldbausch	6	6
13	(United States) Ozan Colak	6	6
(Bulgaria) Dinko Dinev	0	1
Q	(Australia) Henry Lamchinniah	4	5
(Mexico) Luis Carlos Álvarez Valdés	6	7
Q	(Italy) Gianmarco Gandolfi	5	1
(Czech Republic) Matthew William Donald	7	6
(Russia) Artur Kukasian	6	4	3
2	(Croatia) Mili Poljičak	4	6	6

Second round
(Cyprus) C Koshis	6	6
WC	(Australia) J Jin	4	2
(Japan) LR Jones	7^{7}	6^{3}	2^{r}
11	(Switzerland) K Feldbausch	6^{3}	7^{7}	3
13	(United States) O Colak	6	6
(Mexico) LC Álvarez Valdés	4	0
(Czech Republic) MW Donald	2	6^{3}
2	(Croatia) M Poljičak	6	7^{7}

Third round
(Cyprus) C Koshis	2	3
11	(Switzerland) K Feldbausch	6	6
13	(United States) O Colak	3	6	7
2	(Croatia) M Poljičak	6	1	5

Quarterfinals
11	(Switzerland) K Feldbausch	2	7^{7}	6
13	(United States) O Colak	6	6^{0}	4

== Qualifying ==
=== Seeds ===
1. (United States) Kurt Miller (qualifying competition)
2. (Czech Republic) Štěpán Mrůzek (first round)
3. (United States) Alex Michelsen (qualifying competition)
4. (United Kingdom) Louis Bowden (qualified)
5. (United Kingdom) Patrick Brady (first round)
6. (Italy) Niccolò Ciavarella (qualifying competition)
7. (Italy) Lorenzo Ferri (first round)
8. (Italy) Gianmarco Gandolfi (qualified)
9. (Netherlands) Daniël Verbeek (qualified)
10. (Argentina) Valentín Basel (first round)
11. (Greece) Theodoros Mitsakos (qualifying competition)
12. (Japan) Kenta Miyoshi (qualifying competition)
13. (United States) Quang Duong (qualified)
14. (New Zealand) Jack Loutit (qualified)
15. (Switzerland) Manfredi Graziani (first round)
16. (Japan) Asahi Harazaki (qualified)

=== Qualifiers ===
1. (New Zealand) Jack Loutit
2. (Australia) Henry Lamchinniah
3. (Japan) Asahi Harazaki
4. (United Kingdom) Louis Bowden
5. (United States) Rohan Murali
6. (Netherlands) Daniël Verbeek
7. (United States) Quang Duong
8. (Italy) Gianmarco Gandolfi

=== Draw ===
==== First qualifier ====
First round
1	(United States) Kurt Miller	6	6
(Australia) Michael Caspanello	4	2
WC	(Australia) Hugh Winter	2	1
14	(New Zealand) Jack Loutit	6	6

Qualifying competition
1	(United States) Kurt Miller	4	4
14	(New Zealand) Jack Loutit	6	6

==== Second qualifier ====
First round
2	(Czech Republic) Štěpán Mrůzek	0	4
WC	(Australia) Henry Lamchinniah	6	6
(Australia) Jiayang Dong	6	6
10	(Argentina) Valentín Basel	4	2

Qualifying competition
WC	(Australia) Henry Lamchinniah	6	6
(Australia) Jiayang Dong	2	1

==== Third qualifier ====
First round
3	(United States) Alex Michelsen	6	3	6
WC	(Australia) Nicholas De Vivo	1	6	3
(Switzerland) Kaj Quirijns	5	1
16	(Japan) Asahi Harazaki	7	6

Qualifying competition
3	(United States) Alex Michelsen	7	6^{4}	1
16	(Japan) Asahi Harazaki	5	7^{7}	6

==== Fourth qualifier ====
First round
4	(United Kingdom) Louis Bowden	6	6
WC	(Australia) Jonas Hahn	2	2
(Australia) Marcus Schoeman	6	7
15	(Switzerland) Manfredi Graziani	3	5

Qualifying competition
4	(United Kingdom) Louis Bowden	6	6
(Australia) Marcus Schoeman	2	1

==== Fifth qualifier ====
First round
5	(United Kingdom) Patrick Brady	4	6	6^{7}
(United States) Rohan Murali	6	4	7^{10}
(Australia) Christopher Sousou	1	1
12	(Japan) Kenta Miyoshi	6	6

Qualifying competition
(United States) Rohan Murali	6	6
12	(Japan) Kenta Miyoshi	0	1

==== Sixth qualifier ====
First round
6	(Italy) Niccolò Ciavarella	3	6	6
WC	(Australia) Alexander Despoja	6	3	1
(Australia) Leo Phijidvijan	1	0
9	(Netherlands) Daniël Verbeek	6	6

Qualifying competition
6	(Italy) Niccolò Ciavarella	4	1
9	(Netherlands) Daniël Verbeek	6	6

==== Seventh qualifier ====
First round
7	(Italy) Lorenzo Ferri	6^{4}	6	1
(Czech Republic) Adam Křesina	7^{7}	1	6
WC	(Australia) Jeremy Zhang	2	6	5
13	(United States) Quang Duong	6	2	7

Qualifying competition
(Czech Republic) Adam Křesina	5	3
13	(United States) Quang Duong	7	6

==== Eighth qualifier ====
First round
8	(Italy) Gianmarco Gandolfi	6	6
(Australia) Jett Leong	3	1
(Indonesia) Nathan Anthony Barki	2	4
11	(Greece) Theodoros Mitsakos	6	6

Qualifying competition
8	(Italy) Gianmarco Gandolfi	6	6
11	(Greece) Theodoros Mitsakos	1	0
