= Kalin Ivanovski =

Macedonian tennis player (born 2004)

- Country (sports): North Macedonia
- Residence: Skopje
- Born: 11 May 2004 (age 22) Skopje, Macedonia
- Height: 1.96 m (6 ft 5 in)
- Turned pro: 2022
- Plays: Right-handed (two-handed backhand)
- Coach: Velimir Zovko
- Prize money: US $77,465

Singles
- Career record: 0–0 (at ATP Tour level, Grand Slam level, and in Davis Cup)
- Career titles: 0
- Highest ranking: No. 305 (16 October 2023)
- Current ranking: No. 715 (26 October 2026)

Grand Slam singles results
- Australian Open Junior: 1R (2022)
- French Open Junior: 1R (2022)
- Wimbledon Junior: QF (2022)
- US Open Junior: Q1 (2021)

Doubles
- Career record: 0–0 (at ATP Tour level, Grand Slam level, and in Davis Cup)
- Career titles: 0
- Highest ranking: No. 514 (29 May 2023)
- Current ranking: No. 1,930 (26 October 2026)

Grand Slam doubles results
- Australian Open Junior: 1R (2022)
- French Open Junior: 1R (2022)
- Wimbledon Junior: 1R (2021)
- US Open Junior: 1R (2021)

Team competitions
- Davis Cup: 10–2
- Last updated on: 26 October 2026.

Kalin Ivanovski (born 11 May 2004) is a Macedonian tennis player. He has a career high ATP singles ranking of No. 305 achieved on 16 October 2023 and a career high ATP doubles ranking of No. 514 achieved on 29 May 2023.

Ivanovski represents North Macedonia at the Davis Cup, where he has a win-loss record of 10-2.

== ATP Challenger and ITF World Tennis Tour finals ==
=== Singles: 10 (5–5) ===
Legend ATP Challenger Tour (0–0) ITF World Tennis Tour (5–5)	Finals by surface Hard (3–2) Clay (2–3) Grass (0–0) Carpet (0–0)

Result	W–L	Date	Tournament	Tier	Surface	Opponent	Score
Win	1–0	Aug 2022	M15 Monastir, Tunisia	World Tennis Tour	Hard	(Bosnia and Herzegovina) Aziz Kijametović	4–6, 6–4, 6–1
Win	2–0	Oct 2022	M15 Heraklion, Greece	World Tennis Tour	Hard	(Romania) Sebastian Gima	6–1, 6–1
Win	3–0	Dec 2022	M15 Madrid, Spain	World Tennis Tour	Hard	(United Kingdom) Mark Whitehouse	6–4, 6–2
Loss	3–1	Jan 2023	M15 Monastir, Tunisia	World Tennis Tour	Hard	(Tunisia) Moez Echargui	6–3, 3–6, 6–7^{(5–7)}
Loss	3–2	Feb 2023	M15 Monastir, Tunisia	World Tennis Tour	Hard	(Netherlands) Ryan Nijboer	2–6, 0–3, ret.
Loss	3–3	May 2023	M25 Kuršumlijska Banja, Serbia	World Tennis Tour	Clay	(France) Clément Tabur	4–6, 6–3, 2–6
Win	4–3	Jun 2023	M25 Skopje, North Macedonia	World Tennis Tour	Clay	(France) Sascha Gueymard Wayenburg	7–6^{(7–2)}, 6–4
Win	5–3	Jul 2023	M25 Kramsach, Austria	World Tennis Tour	Clay	(South Korea) Gerard Campaña Lee	6–2, 6–2
Loss	5–4	Mar 2025	M15 Opatija, Croatia	World Tennis Tour	Clay	(Croatia) Luka Mikrut	3–6, 6–7^{(4–7)}
Loss	5–5	Jun 2026	M25 Zagreb, Croatia	World Tennis Tour	Clay	(Uzbekistan) Khumoyun Sultanov	4–6, 4–6
