= Bruno Kuzuhara =

American tennis player

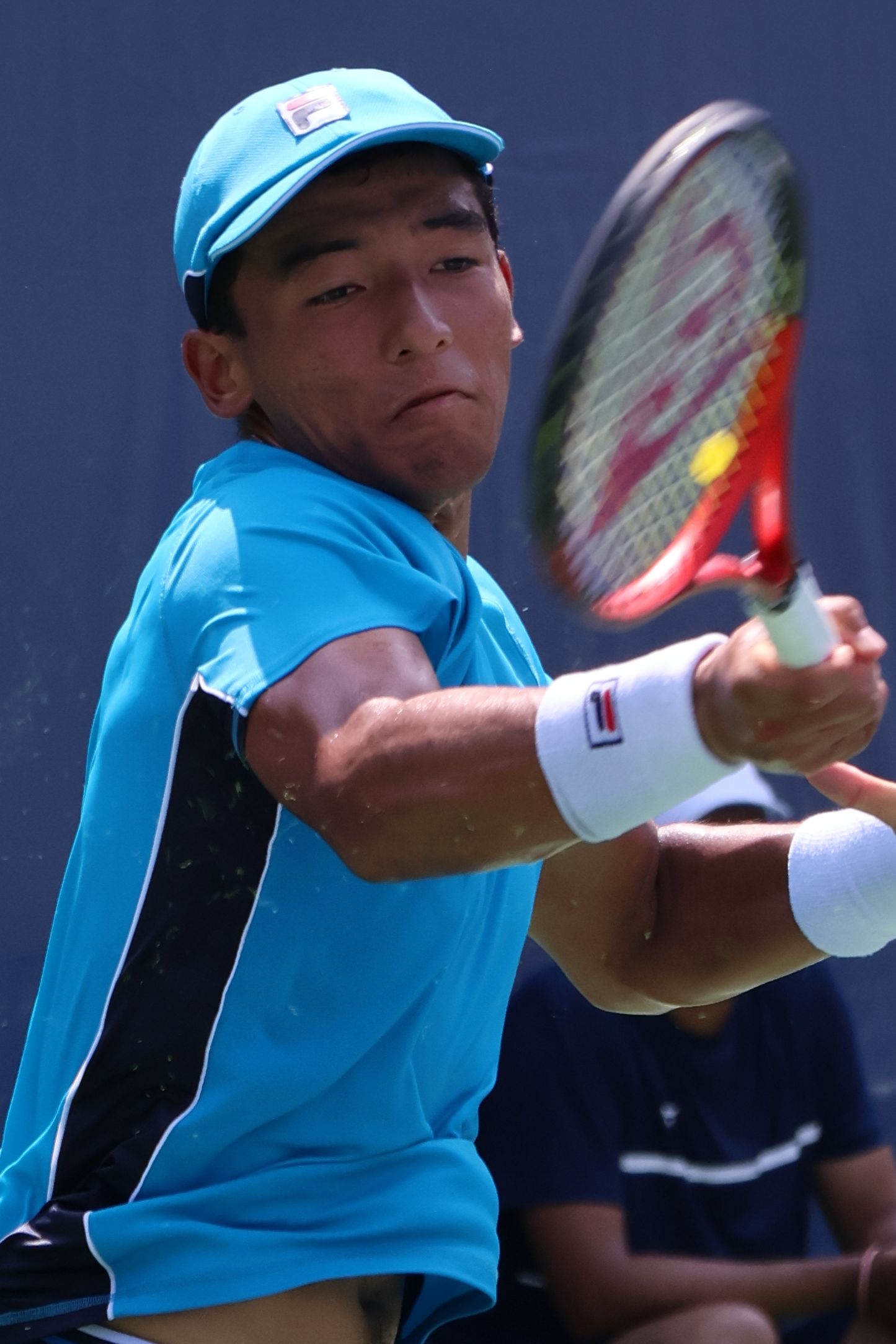
- Kuzuhara at the 2023 DC Open
- Full name: Bruno Kuzuhara
- Country (sports): United States
- Residence: Coconut Creek, Florida, United States
- Born: April 1, 2004 (age 22) São Paulo, Brazil
- Height: 5 ft 9 in (1.75 m)
- Turned pro: 2022
- Plays: Right-handed (two handed-backhand)
- College: Clemson (2026-present)
- Prize money: US $203,085

Singles
- Career record: 0–0 (at ATP Tour level, Grand Slam level, and in Davis Cup)
- Career titles: 0
- Highest ranking: No. 394 (July 22, 2024)
- Current ranking: No. 710 (November 9, 2026)

Grand Slam singles results
- Australian Open: Q1 (2023)
- US Open: Q2 (2022)

Doubles
- Career record: 0–0 (at ATP Tour level, Grand Slam level, and in Davis Cup)
- Career titles: 0
- Highest ranking: No. 561 (June 8, 2026)
- Current ranking: No. 1,220 (November 9, 2026)

Grand Slam mixed doubles results
- US Open: 1R (2021)
- Last updated on: November 9, 2026.

Bruno Kuzuhara (born April 1, 2004) is an American professional tennis player. He has a career-high ATP singles ranking of No. 394 achieved on July 22, 2024 and a doubles ranking of No. 561 achieved on June 8, 2026.

Kuzuhara won the 2022 Australian Open Juniors singles and doubles events. He reached an ITF junior combined ranking of world No. 1 in January 2022.

== Personal life ==
Born in Brazil, both his parents have Japanese heritage. They moved to the U.S. when he was a baby. He now lives in Coconut Creek, Florida. He has trained under Brian Baker at the national campus in Florida.

== Career ==
He was given his ATP tour debut as a wildcard at the 2021 US Open in the mixed doubles alongside Elvina Kalieva.

As the top seed, he won the 2022 Australian Open in Boys singles defeating Czech Jakub Menšík. He also won the doubles event partnering Hong Kong player Coleman Wong. At 17 years old he became the fourth player from the US in the Open Era to claim the junior singles title, following in the footsteps of Andy Roddick, Donald Young and Sebastian Korda. He was also the first player since Czech Jiří Veselý in 2011 to sweep the singles and doubles events.

On June 15, 2026, Kuzuhara's commitment to play college tennis for the Clemson Tigers was announced by college tennis insider Parsa Bombs.

== ATP Challenger and ITF World Tennis Tour finals ==
=== Singles: 6 (4 titles, 2 runner-ups) ===
Legend ATP Challenger Tour (0–0) ITF WTT (4–2)	Finals by surface Hard (2–0) Clay (2–2)

Result	W–L	Date	Tournament	Tier	Surface	Opponent	Score
Loss	0–1	Oct 2022	M15 Antalya, Turkey	WTT	Clay	(Italy) Luca Tomasetto	4–6, 1–6
Loss	0–2	Oct 2022	M15 Antalya, Turkey	WTT	Clay	(Montenegro) Rrezart Cungu	6–4, 3–6, 1–6
Win	1–2	Sep 2023	M15 Punta del Este, Uruguay	WTT	Clay	(Ecuador) Álvaro Guillén Meza	6–7^{(3–7)}, 6–1, 6–3
Win	2–2	Nov 2023	M15 Santo Domingo, Dominican Republic	WTT	Hard	(Argentina) Facundo Mena	7–5, 7–5
Win	3–2	Nov 2023	M15 Santo Domingo, Dominican Republic	WTT	Hard	(Argentina) Facundo Mena	6–1, 6–0
Win	4–2	Feb 2025	M15 Sunrise, US	WTT	Clay	(United States) Garrett Johns	6–1, 6–2

=== Doubles: 9 (5 titles, 4 runner-ups) ===
Legend ATP Challenger Tour (0–1) ITF WTT (5–3)	Finals by surface Hard (1–3) Clay (4–1)

Result	W–L	Date	Tournament	Tier	Surface	Partner	Opponents	Score
Loss	0–1	Oct 2024	Fairfield Challenger, US	Challenger	Hard	(Romania) Gabi Adrian Boitan	(United States) Ryan Seggerman (United States) Patrik Trhac	2–6, 6–3, [5–10]

Result	W–L	Date	Tournament	Tier	Surface	Partner	Opponents	Score
Loss	0–1	Jul 2021	M15 Edwardsville, US	WTT	Hard	(United States) Christian Langmo	(United States) Nathan Ponwith (United States) Reese Stalder	4–6, 4–6
Win	1–1	Oct 2021	M15 Naples, US	WTT	Clay	(Jordan) Abedallah Shelbayh	(Denmark) Johannes Ingildsen (Portugal) Duarte Vale	6–4, 6–1
Win	2–1	May 2022	M15 Antalya, Turkey	WTT	Clay	(United States) Victor Lilov	(Poland) Maks Kaśnikowski (Switzerland) Jérôme Kym	walkover
Loss	2–2	Jun 2022	M25 Montauban, France	WTT	Clay	(Spain) Iñaki Cabrera Bello	(France) Ugo Blanchet (France) Arthur Reymond	3–6, 3–6
Loss	2–3	Oct 2022	M15 Monastir, Tunisia	WTT	Hard	(China) Sun Fajing	(Australia) James Frawley (Germany) Christoph Negritu	4–6, 6–1, [6–10]
Win	3–3	Feb 2023	M15 Weston, US	WTT	Clay	(United States) Vasil Kirkov	(Czech Republic) Jiří Jeníček (Czech Republic) Daniel Pátý	6–2, 6–3
Win	4–3	Jul 2025	M25 Dallas, US	WTT	Hard (i)	(United States) Samir Banerjee	(Japan) Kosuke Ogura (Japan) Leo Vithoontien	6–4, 6–3
Win	5–3	Oct 2025	M25 Lajeado, Brazil	WTT	Clay	(Brazil) João Eduardo Schiessl	(Brazil) Mateus Alves (Brazil) Eduardo Ribeiro	6–4, 6–7^{(4–7)}, [10–8]

== Junior Grand Slam finals ==
=== Singles: 1 (title) ===
Result	Year	Tournament	Surface	Opponent	Score
Win	2022	Australian Open	Hard	(Czech Republic) Jakub Menšík	7–6^{(7–4)}, 6–7^{(6–8)}, 7–5

=== Doubles: 1 (title) ===
Result	Year	Tournament	Surface	Partner	Opponents	Score
Win	2022	Australian Open	Hard	(Hong Kong) Coleman Wong	(United States) Alex Michelsen (Paraguay) Daniel Vallejo	6–3, 7–6^{(7–3)}

== ITF Junior Circuit ==
=== Singles: 10 (5 titles, 5 runner-ups) ===
Legend
Category JA (1–1)
Category J1 (1–3)
Category J2 (0–0)
Category J3 (0–0)
Category J4 (0–1)
Category J5 (3–0)

Result	W–L	Date	Tournament	Category	Surface	Opponent	Score
Win	1–0	Oct 2018	III Copa Mangulina, Dominican Republic	Category G5 (Note: Categorically equal to "J5")	Clay	(Ecuador) Alexander Zederbauer Lapentti	6–1, 3–6, 6–3
Win	2–0	Nov 2018	Goombay Splash Bowl, The Bahamas	Category G5 (Note: Categorically equal to "J5")	Hard	(The Bahamas) Jacobi Bain	6–3, 6–3
Win	3–0	Jul 2019	J5 Curitiba, Brazil	Category J5	Clay	(Brazil) Joaquim de Almeida	6–0, 5–7, 6–2
Loss	3–1	Nov 2019	J4 Boca Raton, United States	Category J4	Hard	(United States) Jack Anthrop	4–6, 7–6^{(7–4)}, 1–6
Loss	3–2	Feb 2020	J1 Lambaré, Paraguay	Category J1	Clay	(Italy) Luciano Darderi	6–7^{(2–7)}, 1–6
Loss	3–3	Feb 2021	J1 Salinas, Ecuador	Category J1	Hard	(China) Shang Juncheng	2–6, 6–1, 2–6
Win	4–3	Feb 2021	J1 Lambaré, Paraguay	Category J1	Clay	(Brazil) Pedro Boscardin Dias	6–4, 6–2
Loss	4–4	Feb 2021	J1 Porto Alegre, Brazil	Category J1	Clay	(Sweden) Leo Borg	6–3, 4–6, 2–6
Loss	4–5	Dec 2021	JA Plantation, United States	Category JA	Clay	(Paraguay) Daniel Vallejo	2–6, 3–6
Win	5–5	Jan 2022	Australian Open, Australia	Category JA	Hard	(Czech Republic) Jakub Menšík	7–6^{(7–4)}, 6–7^{(6–8)}, 7–5

=== Doubles: 6 (1 title, 5 runner-ups) ===
Legend
Category JA (1–0)
Category J1 (0–2)
Category J2 (0–1)
Category J3 (0–0)
Category J4 (0–1)
Category J5 (0–1)

Result	W–L	Date	Tournament	Category	Surface	Partner	Opponents	Score
Loss	0–1	May 2019	J4 Plantation, United States	Category J4	Clay	(United States) Jake Krug	(United States) Jameson Corsillo (United States) Hunter Heck	4–6, 6–7^{(4–7)}
Loss	0–2	May 2019	J5 Curitiba, Brazil	Category J5	Clay	(Brazil) João Pedro de Favari Engel	(Brazil) João Victor Couto Loureiro (Brazil) Gustavo Madureira	2–6, 4–6
Loss	0–3	Sep 2019	J2 Montréal, Canada	Category J2	Hard	(United States) Victor Lilov	(Canada) Joshua Lapadat (Canada) Ilya Tiraspolsky	2–6, 3–6
Loss	0–4	Feb 2021	J1 Salinas, Ecuador	Category J1	Hard	(United States) Victor Lilov	(United States) Alexander Bernard (United States) Dali Blanch	4–6, 7–6^{(11–9)}, [2–10]
Loss	0–5	Jan 2022	J1 Traralgon, Australia	Category J1	Hard	(Hong Kong) Coleman Wong	(Lithuania) Edas Butvilas (Croatia) Mili Poljičak	7–5, 2–6, [4–10]
Win	1–5	Jan 2022	Australian Open, Australia	Category JA	Hard	(Hong Kong) Coleman Wong	(United States) Alex Michelsen (Paraguay) Daniel Vallejo	6–3, 7–6^{(7–3)}
