= 2022 Australian Open – Boys' doubles =

Boys' doubles
- 2022 Australian Open

Final
- Champions: (United States) Bruno Kuzuhara (Hong Kong) Coleman Wong
- Runners-up: (United States) Alex Michelsen (Paraguay) Adolfo Daniel Vallejo
- Score: 6–3, 7–6^{(7–3)}

Events
Singles	men	women		boys	girls
Doubles	men	women	mixed	boys	girls
WC Singles	men	women	quad	boys	girls
WC Doubles	men	women	quad	boys	girls
- Australian Open

Bruno Kuzuhara and Coleman Wong defeated Alex Michelsen and Adolfo Daniel Vallejo in the final, 6–3, 7–6^{(7–3)} to win the boys' doubles title at the 2022 Australian Open. Wong became the first Hongkonger win an Australian Open title, and the first Hongkonger to win two titles at majors, having previously won the junior doubles at the 2021 US Open.

David Ionel and Leandro Riedi were the defending champions, but both players were no longer eligible to participate in junior events.

== Seeds ==
1. (Lithuania) Edas Butvilas / (Croatia) Mili Poljičak (quarterfinals)
2. (United States) Bruno Kuzuhara / (Hong Kong) Coleman Wong (champions)
3. (France) Gabriel Debru / (Switzerland) Kilian Feldbausch (semifinals)
4. (North Macedonia) Kalin Ivanovski / (Russia) Konstantin Zhzhenov (first round)
5. (South Korea) Gerard Campaña Lee / (Argentina) Lautaro Midón (first round)
6. (Poland) Olaf Pieczkowski / (Poland) Borys Zgoła (first round)
7. (Czech Republic) Hynek Bartoň / (Czech Republic) Jakub Menšík (second round)
8. (Slovenia) Bor Artnak / (Czech Republic) Vojtěch Petr (second round)

== Draw ==
Key

- Q = Qualifier
- WC = Wild card
- LL = Lucky loser
- Alt = Alternate
- ITF = ITF entry
- PR = Protected ranking
- SR = Special ranking
- SE = Special exempt
- JE = Junior exempt
- JR = Junior Accelerator Programme entrant
- CO = College Accelerator Programme entrant
- NG = Next Gen Accelerator Program entrant
- w/o = Walkover
- r = Retired
- d = Defaulted

=== Finals ===
Semifinals
(Thailand) Tanapatt Nirundorn (Canada) Jaden Weekes	2	7	[5]
(United States) Alex Michelsen (Paraguay) Adolfo Daniel Vallejo	6	5	[10]
3	(France) Gabriel Debru (Switzerland) Kilian Feldbausch	4	4
2	(United States) Bruno Kuzuhara (Hong Kong) Coleman Wong	6	6

Final
(United States) Alex Michelsen (Paraguay) Adolfo Daniel Vallejo	3	6^{3}
2	(United States) Bruno Kuzuhara (Hong Kong) Coleman Wong	6	7^{7}

=== Top half ===
First round
1	(Lithuania) Edas Butvilas (Croatia) Mili Poljičak	7	6
(France) Arthur Géa (Japan) Lennon Roark Jones	5	2
(Germany) Liam Gavrielides (Russia) Artur Kukasian	6	6^{6}	[9]
(United Kingdom) Patrick Brady (Namibia) Connor Henry van Schalkwyk	2	7^{8}	[4]^{r}
(Peru) Ignacio Buse (Bulgaria) Dinko Dinev	4	6	[10]
WC	(Australia) Alexander Despoja (Australia) Henry Lamchinniah	6	4	[5]
(Thailand) Tanapatt Nirundorn (Canada) Jaden Weekes	2	6	[10]
6	(Poland) Olaf Pieczkowski (Poland) Borys Zgoła	6	3	[8]
4	(North Macedonia) Kalin Ivanovski (Russia) Konstantin Zhzhenov	6	4	[6]
(United States) Ozan Colak (United States) Aidan Kim	2	6	[10]
WC	(Australia) Hayden Jones (Australia) Zachary Viiala	3	4
(Croatia) Luka Mikrut (Croatia) Dino Prižmić	6	6
(United States) Alex Michelsen (Paraguay) Adolfo Daniel Vallejo	6	6
(United States) Quang Duong (Japan) Asahi Harazaki	3	3
(Switzerland) Dylan Dietrich (Austria) Jan Kobierski	6	3	[4]
7	(Czech Republic) Hynek Bartoň (Czech Republic) Jakub Menšík	3	6	[10]

Second round
1	(Lithuania) E Butvilas (Croatia) M Poljičak	6	6
(Germany) L Gavrielides (Russia) A Kukasian	4	4
(Peru) I Buse (Bulgaria) D Dinev	1	1
(Thailand) T Nirundorn (Canada) J Weekes	6	6
(United States) O Colak (United States) A Kim	6	6
(Croatia) L Mikrut (Croatia) D Prižmić	1	3
(United States) A Michelsen (Paraguay) AD Vallejo	6	3	[10]
7	(Czech Republic) H Bartoň (Czech Republic) J Menšík	3	6	[6]

Quarterfinals
1	(Lithuania) E Butvilas (Croatia) M Poljičak	3	6^{0}
(Thailand) T Nirundorn (Canada) J Weekes	6	7^{7}
(United States) O Colak (United States) A Kim	4	3
(United States) A Michelsen (Paraguay) AD Vallejo	6	6

Semifinals
(Thailand) T Nirundorn (Canada) J Weekes	2	7	[5]
(United States) A Michelsen (Paraguay) AD Vallejo	6	5	[10]

=== Bottom half ===
First round
8	(Slovenia) Bor Artnak (Czech Republic) Vojtěch Petr	6	2	[10]
(Mexico) Luis Carlos Álvarez Valdés (Mexico) Rodrigo Pacheco Méndez	3	6	[6]
(United States) Leanid Boika (Russia) Yaroslav Demin	6	7^{7}
(United Kingdom) Louis Bowden (United Kingdom) Matthew Rankin	3	6^{3}
(Belgium) Alessio Basile (Netherlands) Daniël Verbeek	6	6
WC	(Australia) Charlie Camus (Australia) Cooper Errey	2	3
(Kazakhstan) Max Batyutenko (Italy) Gianmarco Gandolfi	3	2
3	(France) Gabriel Debru (Switzerland) Kilian Feldbausch	6	6
5	(South Korea) Gerard Campaña Lee (Argentina) Lautaro Midón	6	4	[11]
WC	(Australia) Jeremy Jin (Australia) Edward Winter	2	6	[13]
(Belgium) Gilles-Arnaud Bailly (France) Antoine Ghibaudo	6^{6}	3
(Italy) Niccolò Ciavarella (Italy) Daniele Minighini	7^{8}	6
(United States) Kurt Miller (United States) Yannik Rahman	1	1
(Czech Republic) Matthew William Donald (Czech Republic) Jakub Nicod	6	6
(Cyprus) Constantinos Koshis (Turkey) Togan Tokaç	6	6^{2}	[6]
2	(United States) Bruno Kuzuhara (Hong Kong) Coleman Wong	2	7^{7}	[10]

Second round
8	(Slovenia) B Artnak (Czech Republic) V Petr	3	4
(United States) L Boika (Russia) Y Demin	6	6
(Belgium) A Basile (Netherlands) D Verbeek	1	6	[7]
3	(France) G Debru (Switzerland) K Feldbausch	6	1	[10]
WC	(Australia) J Jin (Australia) E Winter	4	2
(Italy) N Ciavarella (Italy) D Minighini	6	6
(Czech Republic) MW Donald (Czech Republic) J Nicod	3	4
2	(United States) B Kuzuhara (Hong Kong) C Wong	6	6

Quarterfinals
(United States) L Boika (Russia) Y Demin	3	6	[9]
3	(France) G Debru (Switzerland) K Feldbausch	6	3	[11]
(Italy) N Ciavarella (Italy) D Minighini	6	0	[7]
2	(United States) B Kuzuhara (Hong Kong) C Wong	4	6	[10]

Semifinals
3	(France) G Debru (Switzerland) K Feldbausch	4	4
2	(United States) B Kuzuhara (Hong Kong) C Wong	6	6
