= 2022 Australian Open – Women's singles =

Tennis championship

Women's singles
- 2022 Australian Open

Final
- Champion: (Australia) Ashleigh Barty
- Runner-up: (United States) Danielle Collins
- Score: 6–3, 7–6^{(7–2)}

Details
- Draw: 128 (16 Q / 8 WC)
- Seeds: 32

Events
Singles	men	women		boys	girls
Doubles	men	women	mixed	boys	girls
WC Singles	men	women	quad	boys	girls
WC Doubles	men	women	quad	boys	girls
- Australian Open

Ashleigh Barty defeated Danielle Collins in the final, 6–3, 7–6^{(7–2)} to win the women's singles tennis title at the 2022 Australian Open. It was her first Australian Open title and third and last major title overall. Barty did not drop a set during the tournament, losing just 30 games across 14 sets. She was the first home player to win the title since Chris O'Neil in 1978. This also marked Barty's last professional appearance, as she announced her retirement from the sport two months later.

Naomi Osaka was the defending champion, but lost to Amanda Anisimova in the third round.

Barty retained the world No. 1 singles ranking after Aryna Sabalenka and Barbora Krejčíková lost in the fourth round and quarterfinals, respectively. Collins entered the top 10 in the WTA rankings for the first time by reaching the final.

Alizé Cornet reached her first major singles quarterfinal on her 63rd main-draw appearance, surpassing Tamarine Tanasugarn's all-time record, who reached her first quarterfinal at the 2008 Wimbledon Championships on her 45th attempt. Kaia Kanepi became the first Estonian to reach the quarterfinals at all four majors. For the first time since 1997, neither Venus nor Serena Williams participated in the Australian Open.

This was the last singles major for former world No. 4 and US Open champion Samantha Stosur, who announced her retirement from the discipline. She lost to Anastasia Pavlyuchenkova in the second round. This was also the final Australian Open appearance for former world No. 1, 2018 finalist and two-time major champion Simona Halep. She lost to Cornet in the fourth round.

This event marked the first major main draw appearance for future world No. 4 and Olympic gold medalist Zheng Qinwen, who lost to Maria Sakkari in the second round.

== Seeds ==
1. (Australia) Ashleigh Barty (champion)
2. (Belarus) Aryna Sabalenka (fourth round)
3. (Spain) Garbiñe Muguruza (second round)
4. (Czech Republic) Barbora Krejčíková (quarterfinals)
5. (Greece) Maria Sakkari (fourth round)
6. (Estonia) Anett Kontaveit (second round)
7. (Poland) Iga Świątek (semifinals)
8. (Spain) Paula Badosa (fourth round)
9. (Tunisia) Ons Jabeur (withdrew due to back injury)
10. (Russia) Anastasia Pavlyuchenkova (third round)
11. (United States) Sofia Kenin (first round)
12. (Kazakhstan) Elena Rybakina (second round, retired)
13. (Japan) Naomi Osaka (third round)
14. (Romania) Simona Halep (fourth round)
15. (Ukraine) Elina Svitolina (third round)
16. (Germany) Angelique Kerber (first round)

17. (United Kingdom) Emma Raducanu (second round)
18. (United States) Coco Gauff (first round)
19. (Belgium) Elise Mertens (fourth round)
20. (Czech Republic) Petra Kvitová (first round)
21. (United States) Jessica Pegula (quarterfinals)
22. (Switzerland) Belinda Bencic (second round)
23. (Canada) Leylah Fernandez (first round)
24. (Belarus) Victoria Azarenka (fourth round)
25. (Russia) Daria Kasatkina (third round)
26. (Latvia) Jeļena Ostapenko (third round)
27. (United States) Danielle Collins (final)
28. (Russia) Veronika Kudermetova (third round)
29. (Slovenia) Tamara Zidanšek (third round)
30. (Italy) Camila Giorgi (third round)
31. (Czech Republic) Markéta Vondroušová (third round)
32. (Spain) Sara Sorribes Tormo (second round)

Click on the seed number of a player to go to their draw section.

== Draw ==
Key

- Q = Qualifier
- WC = Wild card
- LL = Lucky loser
- Alt = Alternate
- ITF = ITF entry
- PR = Protected ranking
- SR = Special ranking
- SE = Special exempt
- JE = Junior exempt
- JR = Junior Accelerator Programme entrant
- CO = College Accelerator Programme entrant
- NG = Next Gen Accelerator Program entrant
- w/o = Walkover
- r = Retired
- d = Defaulted

=== Finals ===
Quarterfinals
1	(Australia) Ashleigh Barty	6	6
21	(United States) Jessica Pegula	2	0
4	(Czech Republic) Barbora Krejčíková	3	2
(United States) Madison Keys	6	6
27	(United States) Danielle Collins	7	6
(France) Alizé Cornet	5	1
7	(Poland) Iga Świątek	4	7^{7}	6
(Estonia) Kaia Kanepi	6	6^{2}	3

Semifinals
1	(Australia) Ashleigh Barty	6	6
(United States) Madison Keys	1	3
27	(United States) Danielle Collins	6	6
7	(Poland) Iga Świątek	4	1

Final
1	(Australia) Ashleigh Barty	6	7^{7}
27	(United States) Danielle Collins	3	6^{2}

=== Top half ===
==== Section 1 ====
First round
1	(Australia) A Barty	6	6
Q	(Ukraine) L Tsurenko	0	1
(Russia) V Gracheva	6	2	3
Q	(Italy) L Bronzetti	3	6	6
(Czech Republic) T Martincová	7	6
(United States) L Davis	5	2
(Russia) A Potapova	4	0
30	(Italy) C Giorgi	6	6
22	(Switzerland) B Bencic	6	6
(France) K Mladenovic	4	3
Q	(Netherlands) A Hartono	6	4	3
(United States) A Anisimova	2	6	6
(Ukraine) D Yastremska	1	6	0^{r}
(United States) M Brengle	6	0	5
(Colombia) C Osorio	3	3
13	(Japan) N Osaka	6	6

Second round
1	(Australia) A Barty	6	6
Q	(Italy) L Bronzetti	1	1
(Czech Republic) T Martincová	2	6^{2}
30	(Italy) C Giorgi	6	7^{7}
22	(Switzerland) B Bencic	2	5
(United States) A Anisimova	6	7
(United States) M Brengle	0	4
13	(Japan) N Osaka	6	6

Third round
1	(Australia) A Barty	6	6
30	(Italy) C Giorgi	2	3
(United States) A Anisimova	4	6	7^{10}
13	(Japan) N Osaka	6	3	6^{5}

Fourth round
1	(Australia) A Barty	6	6
(United States) A Anisimova	4	3

==== Section 2 ====
First round
LL	(Romania) I Bara	3	1
(Spain) N Párrizas Díaz	6	6
(Belgium) M Zanevska	7^{9}	7^{7}
(Slovenia) K Juvan	6^{7}	6^{4}
(United States) B Pera	7	6
(Russia) E Alexandrova	5	3
(Ukraine) A Kalinina	6	6^{1}	5
21	(United States) J Pegula	4	7^{7}	7
28	(Russia) V Kudermetova	6	6
(United States) C Liu	4	4
(Romania) E-G Ruse	6	6
(Italy) J Paolini	1	3
(Belarus) A Sasnovich	3	6	6^{5}
Q	(China) Q Zheng	6	1	7^{10}
PR	(Germany) T Maria	4	6^{2}
5	(Greece) M Sakkari	6	7^{7}

Second round
(Spain) N Párrizas Díaz	w/o
(Belgium) M Zanevska
(United States) B Pera	4	4
21	(United States) J Pegula	6	6
28	(Russia) V Kudermetova	6	7
(Romania) E-G Ruse	2	5
Q	(China) Q Zheng	1	4
5	(Greece) M Sakkari	6	6

Third round
(Spain) N Párrizas Díaz	6^{3}	2
21	(United States) J Pegula	7^{7}	6
28	(Russia) V Kudermetova	4	1
5	(Greece) M Sakkari	6	6

Fourth round
21	(United States) J Pegula	7^{7}	6
5	(Greece) M Sakkari	6^{0}	3

==== Section 3 ====
First round
4	(Czech Republic) B Krejčíková	6	6
(Germany) A Petkovic	2	0
Q	(Slovakia) V Kužmová	5	3
WC	(China) Xiy Wang	7	6
(Croatia) D Vekić	2	2
(United States) A Riske	6	6
(Slovakia) AK Schmiedlová	7^{9}	4	1
26	(Latvia) J Ostapenko	6^{7}	6	6
24	(Belarus) V Azarenka	6	6
(Hungary) P Udvardy	3	1
(Croatia) P Martić	3	3
(Switzerland) J Teichmann	6	6
(Kazakhstan) Y Putintseva	3	3
(France) H Tan	6	6
(France) F Ferro	1	6^{4}
15	(Ukraine) E Svitolina	6	7^{7}

Second round
4	(Czech Republic) B Krejčíková	6	6
WC	(China) Xiy Wang	2	3
(United States) A Riske	6	2	4
26	(Latvia) J Ostapenko	4	6	6
24	(Belarus) V Azarenka	6	6
(Switzerland) J Teichmann	1	2
(France) H Tan	3	7	1^{r}
15	(Ukraine) E Svitolina	6	5	5

Third round
4	(Czech Republic) B Krejčíková	2	6	6
26	(Latvia) J Ostapenko	6	4	4
24	(Belarus) V Azarenka	6	6
15	(Ukraine) E Svitolina	0	2

Fourth round
4	(Czech Republic) B Krejčíková	6	6
24	(Belarus) V Azarenka	2	2

==== Section 4 ====
First round
11	(United States) S Kenin	6^{2}	5
(United States) M Keys	7^{7}	7
(Belgium) G Minnen	5	4
(Romania) J Cristian	7	6
(Belgium) A Van Uytvanck	6	6
Q	(Spain) C Bucșa	3	4
(China) Q Wang	6	6
18	(United States) C Gauff	4	2
32	(Spain) S Sorribes Tormo	6	6
PR	(Belgium) K Flipkens	4	1
WC	(France) D Parry	1	6^{2}
(Ukraine) M Kostyuk	6	7^{7}
LL	(Japan) N Hibino	2	3
Q	(Italy) M Trevisan	6	6
(Australia) A Tomljanović	4	0
8	(Spain) P Badosa	6	6

Second round
(United States) M Keys	6	7
(Romania) J Cristian	2	5
(Belgium) A Van Uytvanck	6	6^{5}	3
(China) Q Wang	2	7^{7}	6
32	(Spain) S Sorribes Tormo	6^{5}	3
(Ukraine) M Kostyuk	7^{7}	6
Q	(Italy) M Trevisan	0	3
8	(Spain) P Badosa	6	6

Third round
(United States) M Keys	4	6	7^{10}
(China) Q Wang	6	3	6^{2}
(Ukraine) M Kostyuk	2	7	4
8	(Spain) P Badosa	6	5	6

Fourth round
(United States) M Keys	6	6
8	(Spain) P Badosa	3	1

=== Bottom half ===
==== Section 5 ====
First round
6	(Estonia) A Kontaveit	6	6
(Czech Republic) K Siniaková	2	3
(Denmark) C Tauson	6	6
(Australia) A Sharma	3	4
(Croatia) A Konjuh	4	6	7
(United States) S Rogers	6	3	5
Q	(United States) C Dolehide	1	3
27	(United States) D Collins	6	6
19	(Belgium) E Mertens	6	7
(Russia) V Zvonareva	4	5
(France) O Dodin	6	5	3
(Romania) I-C Begu	2	7	6
(Switzerland) V Golubic	3	4
(China) S Zhang	6	6
(Kazakhstan) Z Diyas	7^{7}	6^{3}	1
12	(Kazakhstan) E Rybakina	6^{3}	7^{7}	6

Second round
6	(Estonia) A Kontaveit	2	4
(Denmark) C Tauson	6	6
(Croatia) A Konjuh	4	3
27	(United States) D Collins	6	6
19	(Belgium) E Mertens	6	6
(Romania) I-C Begu	3	2
(China) S Zhang	6	1
12	(Kazakhstan) E Rybakina	4	0^{r}

Third round
(Denmark) C Tauson	6	4	5
27	(United States) D Collins	4	6	7
19	(Belgium) E Mertens	6	6
(China) S Zhang	2	2

Fourth round
27	(United States) D Collins	4	6	6
19	(Belgium) E Mertens	6	4	4

==== Section 6 ====
First round
14	(Romania) S Halep	6	6
(Poland) M Fręch	4	3
Q	(United States) K Volynets	6	2	3
(Brazil) B Haddad Maia	3	6	6
Q	(South Korea) S-j Jang	3	6	4
(Montenegro) D Kovinić	6	2	6
(United States) S Stephens	0	6	1
17	(United Kingdom) E Raducanu	6	2	6
29	(Slovenia) T Zidanšek	3	6	7^{10}
(Netherlands) A Rus	6	3	6^{8}
(United Kingdom) H Watson	6	5	6
(Egypt) M Sherif	3	7	2
(France) A Cornet	6	6
Q	(Bulgaria) V Tomova	3	3
(France) C Burel	3	4
3	(Spain) G Muguruza	6	6

Second round
14	(Romania) S Halep	6	6
(Brazil) B Haddad Maia	2	0
(Montenegro) D Kovinić	6	4	6
17	(United Kingdom) E Raducanu	4	6	3
29	(Slovenia) T Zidanšek	7^{7}	6
(United Kingdom) H Watson	6^{4}	4
(France) A Cornet	6	6
3	(Spain) G Muguruza	3	3

Third round
14	(Romania) S Halep	6	6
(Montenegro) D Kovinić	2	1
29	(Slovenia) T Zidanšek	6	4	2
(France) A Cornet	4	6	6

Fourth round
14	(Romania) S Halep	4	6	4
(France) A Cornet	6	3	6

==== Section 7 ====
First round
7	(Poland) I Świątek	6	6
Q	(United Kingdom) H Dart	3	0
WC	(Australia) D Saville	2	3
(Sweden) R Peterson	6	6
(Poland) M Linette	6	7
(Latvia) A Sevastova	4	5
Q	(Switzerland) S Vögele	3	1
25	(Russia) D Kasatkina	6	6
20	(Czech Republic) P Kvitová	2	2
(Romania) S Cîrstea	6	6
(Japan) M Doi	3	5
(Slovakia) K Kučová	6	7
WC	(United States) R Anderson	7^{7}	3	3
WC	(Australia) S Stosur	6^{5}	6	6
(Hungary) A Bondár	2	1
10	(Russia) A Pavlyuchenkova	6	6

Second round
7	(Poland) I Świątek	6	6
(Sweden) R Peterson	2	2
(Poland) M Linette	2	3
25	(Russia) D Kasatkina	6	6
(Romania) S Cîrstea	6	6
(Slovakia) K Kučová	2	4
WC	(Australia) S Stosur	2	2
10	(Russia) A Pavlyuchenkova	6	6

Third round
7	(Poland) I Świątek	6	6
25	(Russia) D Kasatkina	2	3
(Romania) S Cîrstea	6	2	6
10	(Russia) A Pavlyuchenkova	3	6	2

Fourth round
7	(Poland) I Świątek	5	6	6
(Romania) S Cîrstea	7	3	3

==== Section 8 ====
First round
16	(Germany) A Kerber	4	3
(Estonia) K Kanepi	6	6
(Czech Republic) M Bouzková	6	6
Q	(Canada) R Marino	1	3
Q	(United States) H Baptiste	4	7^{7}	6
(France) C Garcia	6	6^{4}	3
WC	(Australia) M Inglis	6	6
23	(Canada) L Fernandez	4	2
31	(Czech Republic) M Vondroušová	6	6
WC	(Australia) P Hon	2	3
Q	(United States) E Bektas	5	4
(Russia) L Samsonova	7	6
(United States) A Li	6^{5}	3
(China) Xin Wang	7^{7}	6
WC	(Australia) S Sanders	7	3	2
2	(Belarus) A Sabalenka	5	6	6

Second round
(Estonia) K Kanepi	6	7^{7}
(Czech Republic) M Bouzková	2	6^{3}
Q	(United States) H Baptiste	6^{4}	6	2
WC	(Australia) M Inglis	7^{7}	2	6
31	(Czech Republic) M Vondroušová	6	7
(Russia) L Samsonova	2	5
(China) Xin Wang	6	4	2
2	(Belarus) A Sabalenka	1	6	6

Third round
(Estonia) K Kanepi	2	6	6
WC	(Australia) M Inglis	6	2	0
31	(Czech Republic) M Vondroušová	6	3	1
2	(Belarus) A Sabalenka	4	6	6

Fourth round
(Estonia) K Kanepi	5	6	7^{10}
2	(Belarus) A Sabalenka	7	2	6^{7}

== Championship match statistics ==
Category	(Australia) Barty	(United States) Collins
1st serve %	38/67 (57%)	40/64 (63%)
1st serve points won	31 of 38 = 82%	25 of 40 = 63%
2nd serve points won	13 of 29 = 45%	12 of 24 = 50%
Total service points won	44 of 67 = 65.67%	37 of 64 = 57.81%
Aces	10	1
Double faults	3	2
Winners	30	17
Unforced errors	22	22
Net points won	5 of 6 = 83%	11 of 16 = 69%
Break points converted	3 of 5 = 60%	2 of 4 = 50%
Return points won	27 of 64 = 42%	23 of 67 = 34%
Total points won	71	60

== Seeded players ==
The following are the seeded players. Seedings are based on WTA rankings as of 10 January 2022. Rank and points before are as of 17 January 2022.

Unlike in the men's tournament, points from the 2021 women's singles tournament will be dropped at the end of this year's tournament in addition to the 2020 women's singles tournament as player's points will also be dropped as usual. The "better of 2020/2021 points" for January, February and March were announced by the WTA in September 2021, even though the 2021 tournament was held three weeks later than in 2022. Accordingly, the higher of each player's 2020 or 2021 points will be replaced by her 2022 points at the end of the tournament.

Seed	Rank	Player	Points before	Points defending from 2020 or 2021	Points won	Points after	Status
1	1	(Australia) Ashleigh Barty	7,111	780	2,000	8,331	Champion, defeated (United States) Danielle Collins [27]
2	2	(Belarus) Aryna Sabalenka	5,698	240	240	5,698	Fourth round lost to (Estonia) Kaia Kanepi
3	3	(Spain) Garbiñe Muguruza	5,425	1,300	70	4,195	Second round lost to (France) Alizé Cornet
4	4	(Czech Republic) Barbora Krejčíková	5,213	110	430	5,533	Quarterfinals lost to (United States) Madison Keys
5	8	(Greece) Maria Sakkari	4,071	240	240	4,071	Fourth round lost to (United States) Jessica Pegula [21]
6	7	(Estonia) Anett Kontaveit	4,231	430	70	3,871	Second round lost to (Denmark) Clara Tauson
7	9	(Poland) Iga Świątek	3,916	240	780	4,456	Semifinals lost to (United States) Danielle Collins [27]
8	6	(Spain) Paula Badosa	4,264	70+29	240+24	4,429	Fourth round lost to (United States) Madison Keys
~~9~~	~~10~~	~~(Tunisia) Ons Jabeur~~	3,500	430	0	3,070	Withdrew due to lower back injury
10	11	(Russia) Anastasia Pavlyuchenkova	2,968	430	130	2,668	Third round lost to (Romania) Sorana Cîrstea
11	13	(United States) Sofia Kenin	2,762	2,000	10	772	First round lost to (United States) Madison Keys
12	12	(Kazakhstan) Elena Rybakina	2,765	130	70	2,705	Second round retired against (China) Zhang Shuai
13	14	(Japan) Naomi Osaka	2,696	2,000	130	826	Third round lost to (United States) Amanda Anisimova
14	15	(Romania) Simona Halep	2,657	780	240	2,117	Fourth round lost to (France) Alizé Cornet
15	17	(Ukraine) Elina Svitolina	2,641	240	130	2,531	Third round lost to (Belarus) Victoria Azarenka [24]
16	20	(Germany) Angelique Kerber	2,517	240	10	2,287	First round lost to (Estonia) Kaia Kanepi
17	18	(United Kingdom) Emma Raducanu	2,595	(1)^{†}	70	2,664	Second round lost to (Montenegro) Danka Kovinić
18	16	(United States) Coco Gauff	2,655	240	10	2,425	First round lost to (China) Wang Qiang
19	26	(Belgium) Elise Mertens	2,091	240	240	2,091	Fourth round lost to (United States) Danielle Collins [27]
20	19	(Czech Republic) Petra Kvitová	2,530	430	10	2,110	First round lost to (Romania) Sorana Cîrstea
21	21	(United States) Jessica Pegula	2,474	430	430	2,474	Quarterfinals lost to (Australia) Ashleigh Barty [1]
22	22	(Switzerland) Belinda Bencic	2,415	130	70	2,355	Second round lost to (United States) Amanda Anisimova
23	24	(Canada) Leylah Fernandez	2,279	40	10	2,249	First round lost to (Australia) Maddison Inglis [WC]
24	25	(Belarus) Victoria Azarenka	2,166	10	240	2,396	Fourth round lost to (Czech Republic) Barbora Krejčíková [4]
25	23	(Russia) Daria Kasatkina	2,360	70	130	2,420	Third round lost to (Poland) Iga Świątek [7]
26	27	(Latvia) Jeļena Ostapenko	2,035	70	130	2,095	Third round lost to (Czech Republic) Barbora Krejčíková [4]
27	30	(United States) Danielle Collins	1,911	70	1,300	3,141	Final lost to (Australia) Ashleigh Barty
28	32	(Russia) Veronika Kudermetova	1,695	130	130	1,695	Third round lost to (Greece) Maria Sakkari [5]
29	29	(Slovenia) Tamara Zidanšek	1,931	70	130	1,991	Third round lost to (France) Alizé Cornet
30	33	(Italy) Camila Giorgi	1,692	130	130	1,692	Third round lost to (Australia) Ashleigh Barty [1]
31	41	(Czech Republic) Markéta Vondroušová	1,447	240	130	1,337	Third round lost to (Belarus) Aryna Sabalenka [2]
32	35	(Spain) Sara Sorribes Tormo	1,588	70	70	1,588	Second round lost to (Ukraine) Marta Kostyuk

† The player did not qualify for the tournament in either 2020 or 2021. Accordingly, points for her 16th best result are deducted instead.

=== Withdrawn players ===
The following players would have been seeded, but withdrew before the tournament began.

Rank	Player	Points before	Points defending from 2020 or 2021	Points after	Withdrawal reason
5	(Czech Republic) Karolína Plíšková	4,582	130	4,452	Right hand injury
28	(United States) Jennifer Brady	1,953	1,300	653	Left foot injury
31	(Czech Republic) Karolína Muchová	1,734	780	954	Stomach injury

== Other entry information ==
=== Wild cards ===
- (United States) Robin Anderson
- (Australia) Priscilla Hon
- (Australia) Maddison Inglis
- (France) Diane Parry
- (Australia) Storm Sanders
- (Australia) Daria Saville
- (Australia) Samantha Stosur
- (China) Wang Xiyu

=== Protected ranking ===
- (Belgium) Kirsten Flipkens
- (Germany) Tatjana Maria

=== Qualifiers ===
- (United States) Hailey Baptiste
- (United States) Emina Bektas
- (Italy) Lucia Bronzetti
- (Spain) Cristina Bucșa
- (United Kingdom) Harriet Dart
- (United States) Caroline Dolehide
- (Netherlands) Arianne Hartono
- (South Korea) Jang Su-jeong
- (Slovakia) Viktória Kužmová
- (Canada) Rebecca Marino
- (Bulgaria) Viktoriya Tomova
- (Italy) Martina Trevisan
- (Ukraine) Lesia Tsurenko
- (Switzerland) Stefanie Vögele
- (United States) Katie Volynets
- (China) Zheng Qinwen

=== Lucky losers ===
- (Romania) Irina Bara
- (Japan) Nao Hibino

=== Withdrawals ===
- † (United States) Serena Williams (41) → replaced by (Kazakhstan) Zarina Diyas (103)
- † (Canada) Bianca Andreescu (46) → replaced by (Poland) Magdalena Fręch (104)
- ‡ (Czech Republic) Karolína Plíšková (5) → replaced by (France) Fiona Ferro (105)
- ‡ (United States) Jennifer Brady (25) → replaced by (China) Wang Qiang (106)
- ‡ (Czech Republic) Karolína Muchová (32) → replaced by (Japan) Misaki Doi (107)
- ‡ (Argentina) Nadia Podoroska (83) → replaced by (France) Harmony Tan (110) (Note: Last direct acceptance)
- § (China) Zheng Saisai (80) → replaced by (Japan) Nao Hibino (LL)
- § (Tunisia) Ons Jabeur (10) → replaced by (Romania) Irina Bara (LL)

† – not included on entry list
‡ – withdrew from entry list
§ – withdrew from main draw

== See also ==
- 2022 Australian Open – Day-by-day summaries
- 2022 WTA Tour
- International Tennis Federation

Preceded by 2021 US Open – Women's singles	Grand Slam women's singles	Succeeded by 2022 French Open – Women's singles
