= 2022 Australian Open – Men's doubles =

Men's doubles
- 2022 Australian Open

Final
- Champions: (Australia) Thanasi Kokkinakis (Australia) Nick Kyrgios
- Runners-up: (Australia) Matthew Ebden (Australia) Max Purcell
- Score: 7–5, 6–4

Details
- Draw: 64
- Seeds: 16

Events
Singles	men	women		boys	girls
Doubles	men	women	mixed	boys	girls
WC Singles	men	women	quad	boys	girls
WC Doubles	men	women	quad	boys	girls
- Australian Open

Thanasi Kokkinakis and Nick Kyrgios defeated Matthew Ebden and Max Purcell in the final, 7–5, 6–4 to win the men's doubles tennis title in an all-Australian final at the 2022 Australian Open. They became the first all-Australian pair to win the title since Todd Woodbridge and Mark Woodforde in 1997, and the first wildcard champions in the Open Era. It marked the first all-Australian final since 1980.

Throughout their run, Kokkinakis and Kyrgios (dubbed "the Special K's") generated more fan fervor than usual for a doubles team. The New York Times wrote that their "mix of skill and showmanship ... has turned their matches into raucous celebrations".

Ivan Dodig and Filip Polášek were the defending champions, but did not participate together. Dodig partnered Marcelo Melo and lost to Simone Bolelli and Fabio Fognini in the second round, while Polášek partnered John Peers and lost to Marcel Granollers and Horacio Zeballos in the quarterfinals.

== Seeds ==
1. (Croatia) Nikola Mektić / (Croatia) Mate Pavić (second round)
2. (United States) Rajeev Ram / (United Kingdom) Joe Salisbury (semifinals)
3. (Spain) Marcel Granollers / (Argentina) Horacio Zeballos (semifinals)
4. (Colombia) Juan Sebastián Cabal / (Colombia) Robert Farah (second round)
5. (Australia) John Peers / (Slovakia) Filip Polášek (quarterfinals)
6. (Germany) Tim Pütz / (New Zealand) Michael Venus (quarterfinals)
7. (France) Nicolas Mahut / (France) Fabrice Martin (first round)
8. (United Kingdom) Jamie Murray / (Brazil) Bruno Soares (third round)

9. (Croatia) Ivan Dodig / (Brazil) Marcelo Melo (second round)
10. (Netherlands) Wesley Koolhof / (United Kingdom) Neal Skupski (quarterfinals)
11. (Belgium) Sander Gillé / (Belgium) Joran Vliegen (first round)
12. (Germany) Kevin Krawietz / (Germany) Andreas Mies (third round)
13. (South Africa) Raven Klaasen / (Japan) Ben McLachlan (third round)
14. (El Salvador) Marcelo Arévalo / (Netherlands) Jean-Julien Rojer (first round)
15. (Uruguay) Ariel Behar / (Ecuador) Gonzalo Escobar (third round)
16. (Kazakhstan) Andrey Golubev / (Croatia) Franko Škugor (first round, retired)

Click on the seed number of a player to go to their draw section.

== Draw ==
Key

- Q = Qualifier
- WC = Wild card
- LL = Lucky loser
- Alt = Alternate
- ITF = ITF entry
- PR = Protected ranking
- SR = Special ranking
- SE = Special exempt
- JE = Junior exempt
- JR = Junior Accelerator Programme entrant
- CO = College Accelerator Programme entrant
- NG = Next Gen Accelerator Program entrant
- w/o = Walkover
- r = Retired
- d = Defaulted

=== Finals ===
Quarterfinals
WC	(Australia) Thanasi Kokkinakis (Australia) Nick Kyrgios	7	3	6
6	(Germany) Tim Pütz (New Zealand) Michael Venus	5	6	3
3	(Spain) Marcel Granollers (Argentina) Horacio Zeballos	7^{7}	6
5	(Australia) John Peers (Slovakia) Filip Polášek	6^{5}	4
10	(Netherlands) Wesley Koolhof (United Kingdom) Neal Skupski	6	4	6^{6}
(Australia) Matthew Ebden (Australia) Max Purcell	3	6	7^{10}
(Italy) Simone Bolelli (Italy) Fabio Fognini	3	2
2	(United States) Rajeev Ram (United Kingdom) Joe Salisbury	6	6

Semifinals
WC	(Australia) Thanasi Kokkinakis (Australia) Nick Kyrgios	7^{7}	6
3	(Spain) Marcel Granollers (Argentina) Horacio Zeballos	6^{4}	4
(Australia) Matthew Ebden (Australia) Max Purcell	6	7^{11}
2	(United States) Rajeev Ram (United Kingdom) Joe Salisbury	3	6^{9}

Final
WC	(Australia) Thanasi Kokkinakis (Australia) Nick Kyrgios	7	6
(Australia) Matthew Ebden (Australia) Max Purcell	5	4

=== Top half ===
==== Section 1 ====
First round
1	(Croatia) N Mektić (Croatia) M Pavić	4	7^{10}	6
(Argentina) F Bagnis (Argentina) F Delbonis	6	6^{8}	4
WC	(Australia) A Bolt (Australia) J McCabe	4	2
WC	(Australia) T Kokkinakis (Australia) N Kyrgios	6	6
(Germany) D Koepfer (Germany) J-L Struff	6	6
(Serbia) F Krajinović (Serbia) M Sabanov	3	3
(Bosnia and Herzegovina) T Brkić (Serbia) N Ćaćić	4	5
15	(Uruguay) A Behar (Ecuador) G Escobar	6	7
11	(Belgium) S Gillé (Belgium) J Vliegen	6^{3}	3
Alt	(United States) N Lammons (United States) J Withrow	7^{7}	6
WC	(Australia) J Kubler (Australia) C O'Connell	7^{8}	3
(Spain) A Davidovich Fokina (Spain) J Munar	6^{6}	2^{r}
(Serbia) L Đere (Italy) S Travaglia	2	3
(Spain) R Carballés Baena (France) H Gaston	6	6
(United States) N Monroe (United States) F Tiafoe	1	6^{3}
6	(Germany) T Pütz (New Zealand) M Venus	6	7^{7}

Second round
1	(Croatia) N Mektić (Croatia) M Pavić	6^{8}	3
WC	(Australia) T Kokkinakis (Australia) N Kyrgios	7^{10}	6
(Germany) D Koepfer (Germany) J-L Struff	6^{5}	6	2
15	(Uruguay) A Behar (Ecuador) G Escobar	7^{7}	4	6
Alt	(United States) N Lammons (United States) J Withrow	7^{7}	4	2
WC	(Australia) J Kubler (Australia) C O'Connell	6^{1}	6	6
(Spain) R Carballés Baena (France) H Gaston	1	4
6	(Germany) T Pütz (New Zealand) M Venus	6	6

Third round
WC	(Australia) T Kokkinakis (Australia) N Kyrgios	6	4	6
15	(Uruguay) A Behar (Ecuador) G Escobar	4	6	4
WC	(Australia) J Kubler (Australia) C O'Connell
6	(Germany) T Pütz (New Zealand) M Venus	w/o

Quarterfinals
WC	(Australia) T Kokkinakis (Australia) N Kyrgios	7	3	6
6	(Germany) T Pütz (New Zealand) M Venus	5	6	3

==== Section 2 ====
First round
3	(Spain) M Granollers (Argentina) H Zeballos	6	6
Alt	(Japan) Y Nishioka (Czech Republic) J Veselý	3	2
(United States) M McDonald (Australia) J Millman	2	2
(United Kingdom) J O'Mara (Belarus) A Vasilevski	6	6
(Spain) P Andújar (Spain) P Martínez	6	6
(Serbia) D Lajović (Serbia) I Sabanov	4	4
(Netherlands) R Haase (Netherlands) B van de Zandschulp	6^{5}	7^{10}	7^{10}
14	(El Salvador) M Arévalo (Netherlands) J-J Rojer	7^{7}	6^{8}	6^{8}
12	(Germany) K Krawietz (Germany) A Mies	7^{9}	6
(Mexico) S González (Argentina) A Molteni	6^{7}	3
WC	(Australia) A Harris (Australia) A Vukic	6^{2}	6^{4}
(United States) A Krajicek (United States) S Querrey	7^{7}	7^{7}
(Australia) M Reid (Australia) J Thompson	6	3	2
WC	(Australia) R Hijikata (Australia) T Schoolkate	4	6	6
(Australia) L Saville (Australia) J-P Smith	3	5
5	(Australia) J Peers (Slovakia) F Polášek	6	7

Second round
3	(Spain) M Granollers (Argentina) H Zeballos	6	6
(United Kingdom) J O'Mara (Belarus) A Vasilevski	3	3
(Spain) P Andújar (Spain) P Martínez	6	7^{8}
(Netherlands) R Haase (Netherlands) B van de Zandschulp	3	6^{6}
12	(Germany) K Krawietz (Germany) A Mies	6	6^{7}	6
(United States) A Krajicek (United States) S Querrey	4	7^{9}	4
WC	(Australia) R Hijikata (Australia) T Schoolkate	1	6	1
5	(Australia) J Peers (Slovakia) F Polášek	6	3	6

Third round
3	(Spain) M Granollers (Argentina) H Zeballos	7	7
(Spain) P Andújar (Spain) P Martínez	5	5
12	(Germany) K Krawietz (Germany) A Mies	1	2
5	(Australia) J Peers (Slovakia) F Polášek	6	6

Quarterfinals
3	(Spain) M Granollers (Argentina) H Zeballos	7^{7}	6
5	(Australia) J Peers (Slovakia) F Polášek	6^{5}	4

=== Bottom half ===
==== Section 3 ====
First round
7	(France) N Mahut (France) F Martin	6^{1}	7	2
(Kazakhstan) A Nedovyesov (Pakistan) A-u-H Qureshi	7^{7}	5	6
(United States) M Giron (South Korea) S-w Kwon	6	6
(Kazakhstan) A Bublik (Poland) J Zieliński	3	4
Alt	(Germany) D Altmaier (Brazil) T Monteiro	4	6	7^{10}
(Italy) G Mager (Italy) L Musetti	6	4	6^{4}
(Monaco) R Arneodo (France) B Paire	1	4
10	(Netherlands) W Koolhof (United Kingdom) N Skupski	6	6
13	(South Africa) R Klaasen (Japan) B McLachlan	7^{7}	3	6
(Netherlands) M Middelkoop (Austria) P Oswald	6^{1}	6	3
(United Kingdom) D Inglot (United Kingdom) K Skupski	4	6	6
(Netherlands) T Griekspoor (Italy) A Vavassori	6	3	4
(Israel) J Erlich (Sweden) A Göransson	6^{5}	3
(Australia) M Ebden (Australia) M Purcell	7^{7}	6
(South Africa) L Harris (Australia) A Popyrin	4	6^{5}
4	(Colombia) JS Cabal (Colombia) R Farah	6	7^{7}

Second round
(Kazakhstan) A Nedovyesov (Pakistan) A-u-H Qureshi	6	3	6^{7}
(United States) M Giron (South Korea) S-w Kwon	1	6	7^{10}
Alt	(Germany) D Altmaier (Brazil) T Monteiro	1	4
10	(Netherlands) W Koolhof (United Kingdom) N Skupski	6	6
13	(South Africa) R Klaasen (Japan) B McLachlan	7	6
(United Kingdom) D Inglot (United Kingdom) K Skupski	5	3
(Australia) M Ebden (Australia) M Purcell	3	6	7
4	(Colombia) JS Cabal (Colombia) R Farah	6	3	5

Third round
(United States) M Giron (South Korea) S-w Kwon	3	4
10	(Netherlands) W Koolhof (United Kingdom) N Skupski	6	6
13	(South Africa) R Klaasen (Japan) B McLachlan	6^{3}	3
(Australia) M Ebden (Australia) M Purcell	7^{7}	6

Quarterfinals
10	(Netherlands) W Koolhof (United Kingdom) N Skupski	6	4	6^{6}
(Australia) M Ebden (Australia) M Purcell	3	6	7^{10}

==== Section 4 ====
First round
8	(United Kingdom) J Murray (Brazil) B Soares	6	6
(Australia) J Duckworth (Australia) M Polmans	3	2
(United Kingdom) L Glasspool (Finland) H Heliövaara	6	6
(Argentina) F Coria (Spain) A Ramos Viñolas	3	3
(Brazil) R Matos (Brazil) F Meligeni Alves	4	4
(Italy) S Bolelli (Italy) F Fognini	6	6
(France) A Mannarino (Monaco) H Nys	6	3	5
9	(Croatia) I Dodig (Brazil) M Melo	4	6	7
16	(Kazakhstan) A Golubev (Croatia) F Škugor	2^{r}
WC	(Australia) D Sweeny (Australia) L Tu	5
(India) R Bopanna (France) É Roger-Vasselin	6	6^{2}	2
WC	(Philippines) T Huey (Indonesia) C Rungkat	3	7^{7}	6
(New Zealand) M Daniell (Denmark) F Nielsen	6	0
(Russia) A Karatsev (New Zealand) A Sitak	2	0^{r}
(Georgia (country)) N Basilashvili (Serbia) M Kecmanović	3	3
2	(United States) R Ram (United Kingdom) J Salisbury	6	6

Second round
8	(United Kingdom) J Murray (Brazil) B Soares	6^{4}	7^{7}	6
(United Kingdom) L Glasspool (Finland) H Heliövaara	7^{7}	6^{2}	1
(Italy) S Bolelli (Italy) F Fognini	7^{7}	6
9	(Croatia) I Dodig (Brazil) M Melo	6^{2}	3
WC	(Australia) D Sweeny (Australia) L Tu	7^{8}	6
WC	(Philippines) T Huey (Indonesia) C Rungkat	6^{6}	4
(New Zealand) M Daniell (Denmark) F Nielsen	1	2
2	(United States) R Ram (United Kingdom) J Salisbury	6	6

Third round
8	(United Kingdom) J Murray (Brazil) B Soares	6	6^{7}	3
(Italy) S Bolelli (Italy) F Fognini	3	7^{9}	6
WC	(Australia) D Sweeny (Australia) L Tu	4	4
2	(United States) R Ram (United Kingdom) J Salisbury	6	6

Quarterfinals
(Italy) S Bolelli (Italy) F Fognini	3	2
2	(United States) R Ram (United Kingdom) J Salisbury	6	6

== Other entry information ==
=== Wild cards ===
- (Australia) Alex Bolt / (Australia) James McCabe
- (Australia) Andrew Harris / (Australia) Aleksandar Vukic
- (Australia) Rinky Hijikata / (Australia) Tristan Schoolkate
- (Philippines) Treat Huey / (Indonesia) Christopher Rungkat
- (Australia) Thanasi Kokkinakis / (Australia) Nick Kyrgios
- (Australia) Jason Kubler / (Australia) Christopher O'Connell
- (Australia) Dane Sweeny / (Australia) Li Tu

=== Alternates ===
- (Japan) Yoshihito Nishioka / (Czech Republic) Jiří Veselý
- (United States) Nathaniel Lammons / (United States) Jackson Withrow
- (Germany) Daniel Altmaier / (Brazil) Thiago Monteiro

=== Withdrawals ===
Before the tournament

- (Spain) Carlos Alcaraz / (Spain) Pablo Carreño Busta → replaced by (Germany) Daniel Altmaier / (Brazil) Thiago Monteiro
- (Spain) Roberto Bautista Agut / (Spain) Pedro Martínez → replaced by (Spain) Pablo Andújar / (Spain) Pedro Martínez
- (Italy) Simone Bolelli / (Argentina) Máximo González → replaced by (Italy) Simone Bolelli / (Italy) Fabio Fognini
- (France) Benjamin Bonzi / (France) Arthur Rinderknech → replaced by (United States) Nathaniel Lammons / (United States) Jackson Withrow
- (New Zealand) Marcus Daniell / (Brazil) Marcelo Demoliner → replaced by (New Zealand) Marcus Daniell / (Denmark) Frederik Nielsen
- (Hungary) Márton Fucsovics / (United States) Tommy Paul → replaced by (Japan) Yoshihito Nishioka / (Czech Republic) Jiří Veselý
- (Belarus) Ilya Ivashka / (Belarus) Andrei Vasilevski → replaced by (United Kingdom) Jonny O'Mara / (Belarus) Andrei Vasilevski
- (United States) Steve Johnson / (United States) Austin Krajicek → replaced by (United States) Austin Krajicek / (United States) Sam Querrey
- (Austria) Oliver Marach / (United Kingdom) Jonny O'Mara → replaced by (Australia) Matt Reid / (Australia) Jordan Thompson
- (Ukraine) Denys Molchanov / (Russia) Andrey Rublev → replaced by (Australia) James Duckworth / (Australia) Marc Polmans

During the tournament

- (Australia) Jason Kubler / (Australia) Christopher O'Connell (O'Connell hip injury)

Retirements

- (Spain) Alejandro Davidovich Fokina / (Spain) Jaume Munar
- (Kazakhstan) Andrey Golubev / (Croatia) Franko Škugor
- (Russia) Aslan Karatsev / (New Zealand) Artem Sitak
