= 2022 Australian Open – Wheelchair women's doubles =

Wheelchair women's doubles
- 2022 Australian Open

Final
- Champions: (Netherlands) Diede de Groot (Netherlands) Aniek van Koot
- Runners-up: (Japan) Yui Kamiji (United Kingdom) Lucy Shuker
- Score: 7–5, 3–6, [10–2]

Details
- Draw: 4
- Seeds: 2

Events
Singles	men	women		boys	girls
Doubles	men	women	mixed	boys	girls
WC Singles	men	women	quad
WC Doubles	men	women	quad
← 2021 ·	Australian Open	· 2023 →

Defending champions Diede de Groot and Aniek van Koot defeated Yui Kamiji and Lucy Shuker in the final, 7–5, 3–6, [10–2] to win the women's doubles wheelchair tennis title at the 2022 Australian Open.

== Seeds ==
1. (Netherlands) Diede de Groot / (Netherlands) Aniek van Koot (champions)
2. (Japan) Yui Kamiji / (United Kingdom) Lucy Shuker (final)

== Draw ==
=== Key ===
- Q = Qualifier
- WC = Wild card
- LL = Lucky loser
- Alt = Alternate
- ITF = ITF entry
- PR = Protected ranking
- SR = Special ranking
- SE = Special exempt
- JE = Junior exempt
- JR = Junior Accelerator Programme entrant
- CO = College Accelerator Programme entrant
- NG = Next Gen Accelerator Program entrant
- w/o = Walkover
- r = Retired
- d = Defaulted

=== Bracket ===
Semifinals
1	(Netherlands) Diede de Groot (Netherlands) Aniek van Koot	6	6
(United States) Dana Mathewson (South Africa) Kgothatso Montjane	0	3
(Netherlands) Jiske Griffioen (China) Zhu Zhenzhen	2	3
2	(Japan) Yui Kamiji (United Kingdom) Lucy Shuker	6	6

Final
1	(Netherlands) Diede de Groot (Netherlands) Aniek van Koot	7	3	[10]
2	(Japan) Yui Kamiji (United Kingdom) Lucy Shuker	5	6	[2]
