= 2022 Australian Open – Girls' doubles =

Girls' doubles
- 2022 Australian Open

Final
- Champions: (United States) Clervie Ngounoue (Russia) Diana Shnaider
- Runners-up: (Canada) Kayla Cross (Canada) Victoria Mboko
- Score: 6–4, 6–3

Events
Singles	men	women		boys	girls
Doubles	men	women	mixed	boys	girls
WC Singles	men	women	quad
WC Doubles	men	women	quad
- Australian Open

Clervie Ngounoue and Diana Shnaider defeated Kayla Cross and Victoria Mboko in the final, 6–4, 6–3 to win the girls' doubles title at the 2022 Australian Open.

Alex Eala and Priska Madelyn Nugroho were the defending champions, but Nugroho was no longer eligible to participate in junior events, whilst Eala chose not to participate.

== Seeds ==
1. (United States) Clervie Ngounoue / (Russia) Diana Shnaider (champions)
2. (Croatia) Petra Marčinko / (Denmark) Johanne Svendsen (semifinals)
3. (Russia) Yaroslava Bartashevich / (Russia) Ksenia Zaytseva (second round)
4. (Finland) Laura Hietaranta / (Argentina) Solana Sierra (first round)
5. (Croatia) Lucija Ćirić Bagarić / (Belgium) Sofia Costoulas (first round)
6. (Switzerland) Céline Naef / (Canada) Annabelle Xu (first round)
7. (Russia) Anastasiia Gureva / (Russia) Elena Pridankina (quarterfinals)
8. (United States) Alexis Blokhina / (United States) Liv Hovde (quarterfinals)

== Draw ==
Key

- Q = Qualifier
- WC = Wild card
- LL = Lucky loser
- Alt = Alternate
- ITF = ITF entry
- PR = Protected ranking
- SR = Special ranking
- SE = Special exempt
- JE = Junior exempt
- JR = Junior Accelerator Programme entrant
- CO = College Accelerator Programme entrant
- NG = Next Gen Accelerator Program entrant
- w/o = Walkover
- r = Retired
- d = Defaulted

=== Finals ===
Semifinals
1	(United States) Clervie Ngounoue (Russia) Diana Shnaider	7	7^{7}
WC	(Australia) Charlotte Kempenaers-Pocz (Australia) Taylah Preston	5	6^{5}
(Canada) Kayla Cross (Canada) Victoria Mboko	7^{8}	2	[10]
2	(Croatia) Petra Marčinko (Denmark) Johanne Svendsen	6^{6}	6	[7]

Final
1	(United States) Clervie Ngounoue (Russia) Diana Shnaider	6	6
(Canada) Kayla Cross (Canada) Victoria Mboko	4	3

=== Top half ===
First round
1	(United States) Clervie Ngounoue (Russia) Diana Shnaider	6	6
(France) Nahia Berecoechea (Iran) Meshkatolzahra Safi	1	2
(Canada) Mia Kupres (United Kingdom) Ranah Stoiber	4	6	[10]
(Germany) Carolina Kuhl (Serbia) Tijana Sretenović	6	3	[7]
WC	(Australia) Lily Fairclough (Australia) Yilin Yan	4	4
(Romania) Anca Todoni (Belgium) Hanne Vandewinkel	6	6
(Slovakia) Irina Balus (Lithuania) Patricija Paukštytė	6	3	[7]
8	(United States) Alexis Blokhina (United States) Liv Hovde	4	6	[10]
3	(Russia) Yaroslava Bartashevich (Russia) Ksenia Zaytseva	6	6
(Czech Republic) Amélie Šmejkalová (Czech Republic) Tereza Valentová	1	3
(Morocco) Aya El Aouni (Kenya) Angella Okutoyi	1	1
(Japan) Mao Mushika (Japan) Mio Mushika	6	6
(Brazil) Ana Candiotto (Chinese Taipei) Li Yu-yun	1	6	[6]
WC	(Australia) Charlotte Kempenaers-Pocz (Australia) Taylah Preston	6	1	[10]
(Italy) Virginia Ferrara (Italy) Georgia Pedone	6	4	[10]
6	(Switzerland) Céline Naef (Canada) Annabelle Xu	0	6	[8]

Second round
1	(United States) C Ngounoue (Russia) D Shnaider	6	6
(Canada) M Kupres (United Kingdom) RA Stoiber	3	3
(Romania) A Todoni (Belgium) H Vandewinkel	6^{5}	1
8	(United States) A Blokhina (United States) L Hovde	7^{7}	6
3	(Russia) Y Bartashevich (Russia) K Zaytseva	3	2
(Japan) Ma Mushika (Japan) Mi Mushika	6	6
WC	(Australia) C Kempenaers-Pocz (Australia) T Preston	6	6
(Italy) V Ferrara (Italy) G Pedone	3	1

Quarterfinals
1	(United States) C Ngounoue (Russia) D Shnaider	4	6	[10]
8	(United States) A Blokhina (United States) L Hovde	6	4	[8]
(Japan) Ma Mushika (Japan) Mi Mushika	4	0
WC	(Australia) C Kempenaers-Pocz (Australia) T Preston	6	6

Semifinals
1	(United States) C Ngounoue (Russia) D Shnaider	7	7^{7}
WC	(Australia) C Kempenaers-Pocz (Australia) T Preston	5	6^{5}

=== Bottom half ===
First round
5	(Croatia) Lucija Ćirić Bagarić (Belgium) Sofia Costoulas	6^{5}	3
(Canada) Kayla Cross (Canada) Victoria Mboko	7^{7}	6
(Czech Republic) Lucie Havlíčková (Czech Republic) Dominika Šalková	6	6
WC	(Australia) Talia Gibson (Australia) Elena Micic	1	2
(Russia) Mirra Andreeva (Poland) Malwina Rowińska	3	4
(Russia) Ekaterina Khayrutdinova (Kazakhstan) Aruzhan Sagandikova	6	6
(Greece) Michaela Laki (Greece) Dimitra Pavlou	1	6	[10]
4	(Finland) Laura Hietaranta (Argentina) Solana Sierra	6	3	[7]
7	(Russia) Anastasiia Gureva (Russia) Elena Pridankina	7^{9}	6
(Italy) Federica Urgesi (Italy) Denise Valente	6^{7}	2
WC	(Australia) Roisin Gilheany (Australia) Zara Larke	7	2	[4]
(Switzerland) Chelsea Fontenel (United States) Qavia Lopez	5	6	[10]
(Bulgaria) Denislava Glushkova (Australia) Anja Nayar	6	1	[6]
(Japan) Hayu Kinoshita (Japan) Sara Saito	4	6	[10]
(Turkey) Ayşegül Mert (Serbia) Lola Radivojević	1	2
2	(Croatia) Petra Marčinko (Denmark) Johanne Svendsen	6	6

Second round
(Canada) K Cross (Canada) V Mboko	7^{8}	4	[10]
(Czech Republic) L Havlíčková (Czech Republic) D Šalková	6^{6}	6	[4]
(Russia) E Khayrutdinova (Kazakhstan) A Sagandikova	6	6
(Greece) M Laki (Greece) D Pavlou	3	3
7	(Russia) A Gureva (Russia) E Pridankina	4	7^{7}	[10]
(Switzerland) C Fontenel (United States) Q Lopez	6	6^{3}	[7]
(Japan) H Kinoshita (Japan) S Saito	6	4	[11]
2	(Croatia) P Marčinko (Denmark) J Svendsen	4	6	[13]

Quarterfinals
(Canada) K Cross (Canada) V Mboko	6	6
(Russia) E Khayrutdinova (Kazakhstan) A Sagandikova	2	2
7	(Russia) A Gureva (Russia) E Pridankina	6^{5}	4
2	(Croatia) P Marčinko (Denmark) J Svendsen	7^{7}	6

Semifinals
(Canada) K Cross (Canada) V Mboko	7^{8}	2	[10]
2	(Croatia) P Marčinko (Denmark) J Svendsen	6^{6}	6	[7]
