= 2022 Australian Open – Wheelchair women's singles =

Wheelchair women's singles
- 2022 Australian Open

Final
- Champion: (Netherlands) Diede de Groot
- Runner-up: (Netherlands) Aniek van Koot
- Score: 6–1, 6–1

Details
- Draw: 8
- Seeds: 2

Events
Singles	men	women		boys	girls
Doubles	men	women	mixed	boys	girls
WC Singles	men	women	quad
WC Doubles	men	women	quad
← 2021 ·	Australian Open	· 2023 →

Defending champion Diede de Groot defeated Aniek van Koot in the final, 6–1, 6–1 to win the women's singles wheelchair tennis title at the 2022 Australian Open. It was the first step in an eventual Grand Slam for de Groot.

== Seeds ==
1. (Netherlands) Diede de Groot (champion)
2. (Japan) Yui Kamiji (quarterfinals)

== Draw ==
=== Key ===
- Q = Qualifier
- WC = Wild card
- LL = Lucky loser
- Alt = Alternate
- ITF = ITF entry
- PR = Protected ranking
- SR = Special ranking
- SE = Special exempt
- JE = Junior exempt
- JR = Junior Accelerator Programme entrant
- CO = College Accelerator Programme entrant
- NG = Next Gen Accelerator Program entrant
- w/o = Walkover
- r = Retired
- d = Defaulted

=== Bracket ===
Quarterfinals
1	(Netherlands) Diede de Groot	6	6
(United States) Dana Mathewson	2	1
(China) Zhu Zhenzhen	2	2
WC	(United Kingdom) Lucy Shuker	6	6
(South Africa) Kgothatso Montjane	6	6^{4}	7
(Netherlands) Jiske Griffioen	1	7^{7}	5
(Netherlands) Aniek van Koot	7	7
2	(Japan) Yui Kamiji	5	5

Semifinals
1	(Netherlands) Diede de Groot	6	7
WC	(United Kingdom) Lucy Shuker	0	5
(South Africa) Kgothatso Montjane	3	4
(Netherlands) Aniek van Koot	6	6

Final
1	(Netherlands) Diede de Groot	6	6
(Netherlands) Aniek van Koot	1	1
