= 2022 Australian Open – Wheelchair quad doubles =

Wheelchair quad doubles
- 2022 Australian Open

Final
- Champions: (United Kingdom) Andy Lapthorne (United States) David Wagner
- Runners-up: (Netherlands) Sam Schröder (Netherlands) Niels Vink
- Score: 2–6, 6–4, [10–7]

Events
Singles	men	women		boys	girls
Doubles	men	women	mixed	boys	girls
WC Singles	men	women	quad	boys	girls
WC Doubles	men	women	quad	boys	girls
- Australian Open

Andy Lapthorne and David Wagner defeated Sam Schröder and Niels Vink in the final, 2–6, 6–4, [10–7] to win the quad doubles wheelchair tennis title at the 2022 Australian Open.

Dylan Alcott and Heath Davidson were the four-time defending champions, but were defeated by Schröder and Vink in the semifinals.

== Seeds ==
1. (Netherlands) Sam Schröder / (Netherlands) Niels Vink (final)
2. (United Kingdom) Andy Lapthorne / (United States) David Wagner (champions)

== Draw ==
Key

- Q = Qualifier
- WC = Wild card
- LL = Lucky loser
- Alt = Alternate
- ITF = ITF entry
- PR = Protected ranking
- SR = Special ranking
- SE = Special exempt
- JE = Junior exempt
- JR = Junior Accelerator Programme entrant
- CO = College Accelerator Programme entrant
- NG = Next Gen Accelerator Program entrant
- w/o = Walkover
- r = Retired
- d = Defaulted

=== Bracket ===
Semifinals
1	(Netherlands) Sam Schröder (Netherlands) Niels Vink	6	7^{7}
(Australia) Dylan Alcott (Australia) Heath Davidson	1	6^{3}
(South Africa) Donald Ramphadi (Japan) Koji Sugeno	3	6	[6]
2	(United Kingdom) Andy Lapthorne (United States) David Wagner	6	4	[10]

Final
1	(Netherlands) Sam Schröder (Netherlands) Niels Vink	6	4	[7]
2	(United Kingdom) Andy Lapthorne (United States) David Wagner	2	6	[10]
