= 2022 Australian Open =

Tennis competition

- Date: 17–30 January 2022
- Edition: 110th Open Era (54th)
- Category: Grand Slam
- Draw: 128S / 64D
- Prize money: A$74,000,000
- Surface: Hard (Plexicushion)
- Location: Melbourne, Victoria, Australia
- Venue: Melbourne Park
- Attendance: 346,468

Champions

Men's singles
- (Spain) Rafael Nadal

Women's singles
- (Australia) Ashleigh Barty

Men's doubles
- (Australia) Nick Kyrgios / (Australia) Thanasi Kokkinakis

Women's doubles
- (Czech Republic) Barbora Krejčíková / (Czech Republic) Kateřina Siniaková

Mixed doubles
- (France) Kristina Mladenovic / (Croatia) Ivan Dodig

Wheelchair men's singles
- (Japan) Shingo Kunieda

Wheelchair women's singles
- (Netherlands) Diede de Groot

Wheelchair quad singles
- (Netherlands) Sam Schröder

Wheelchair men's doubles
- (United Kingdom) Alfie Hewett / (United Kingdom) Gordon Reid

Wheelchair women's doubles
- (Netherlands) Diede de Groot / (Netherlands) Aniek van Koot

Wheelchair quad doubles
- (United Kingdom) Andy Lapthorne / (United States) David Wagner

Boys' singles
- (United States) Bruno Kuzuhara

Girls' singles
- (Croatia) Petra Marčinko

Boys' doubles
- (United States) Bruno Kuzuhara / (Hong Kong) Coleman Wong

Girls' doubles
- (United States) Clervie Ngounoue / (Russia) Diana Shnaider
- Australian Open

The 2022 Australian Open was a Grand Slam tennis tournament that took place at Melbourne Park, Australia from 17 to 30 January 2022. It was the 110th edition of the Australian Open, the 54th in the Open Era, and the first Grand Slam of the year. The tournament consisted of events for professional players in singles, doubles and mixed doubles. Junior and wheelchair players competed in singles and doubles tournaments. As in previous years, the tournament's main sponsor was Kia.

The men's singles title was won by Rafael Nadal, and was Nadal's 21st major title, and his second Australian Open. He defeated second seed Daniil Medvedev in the final, winning in five sets after being two sets down. In winning the title, Nadal broke the record for all-time men's major singles title - it was previously tied at 20 between himself, Novak Djokovic, and Roger Federer. The women's singles title was won by Ashleigh Barty, who won her first Australian Open title and third major title. She defeated 27th seed Danielle Collins in straight sets. Barty was the first Australian to win the title since Chris O'Neil won the title in 1978. The final would also prove to be Barty's last professional match, with Barty announcing her retirement in March 2022.

The event was overshadowed by Djokovic's battle with Australian immigration after disclosing he was not vaccinated against COVID-19. In the end, he was unable to participate after his visa was cancelled twice by Australian Immigration Minister Alex Hawke.

== Tournament ==
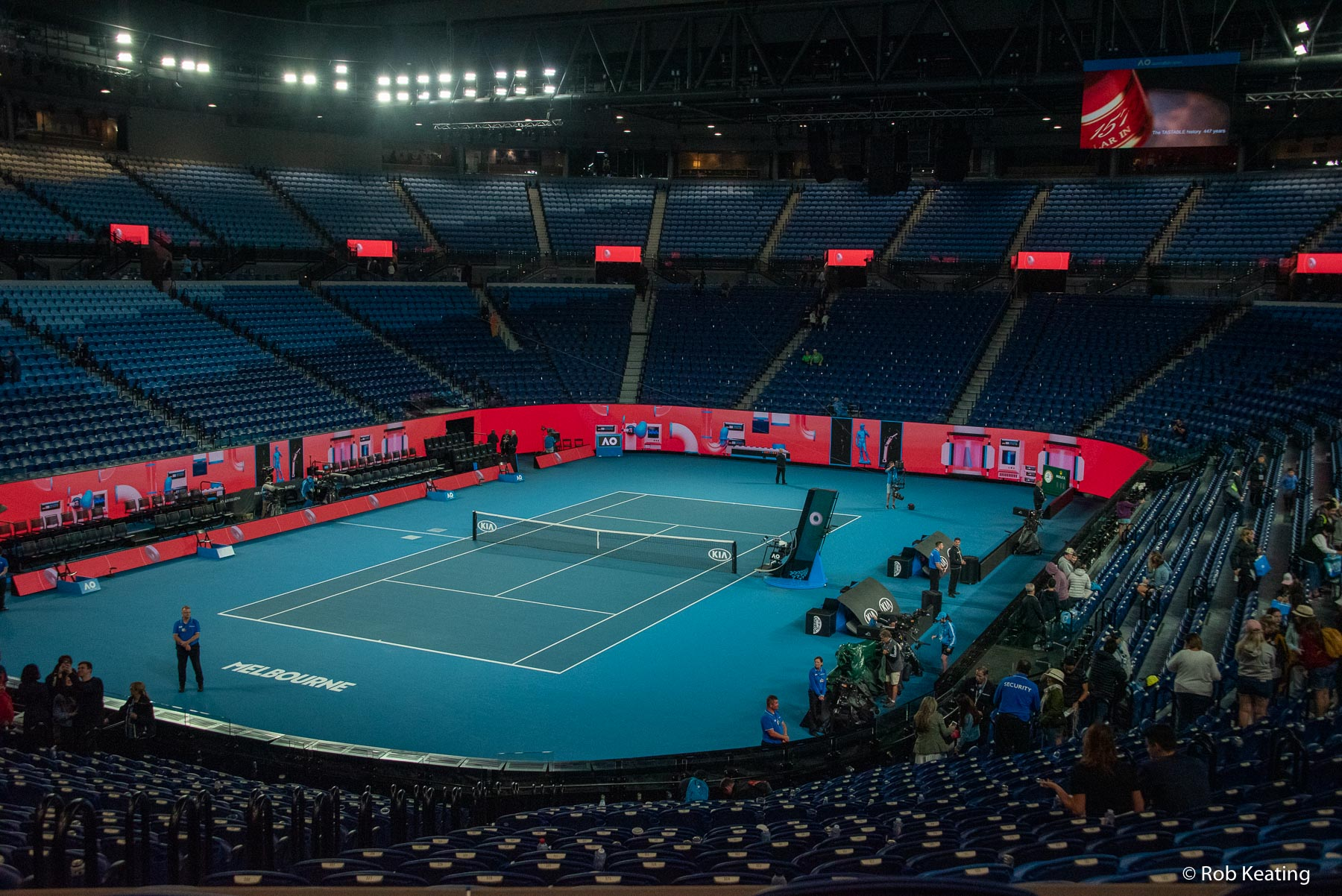
Rod Laver Arena, seen here in 2020, is the tournament's centre court and location of the finals.

The 2022 Australian Open was the 110th edition of the tournament, held at Melbourne Park in Melbourne, Victoria, Australia. The tournament returned to its traditional January slot after the 2021 tournament was held in February after a precaution over concerns with the strict COVID-19 protocols.

The tournament was run by the International Tennis Federation (ITF) and is part of the 2022 ATP Tour and the 2022 WTA Tour calendars under the Grand Slam category. The tournament consisted of both men's and women's singles and doubles draws as well as the mixed doubles events. There were singles and doubles events for both boys and girls (players under 18), which are part of the Grade A category of tournaments. The junior competitions returned after a year of absence. There are also singles, doubles and quad events for men's and women's wheelchair tennis players as part of the NEC tour under the Grand Slam category.

The tournament was played on hard courts and took place across a series of 25 courts, including the four main show courts of Rod Laver Arena, John Cain Arena, Margaret Court Arena and 1573 Arena. It was also the debut of Kia Arena, which made for five main tennis arenas.

== Singles players ==
- Men's singles

Champion		Runner-up	
(Spain) Rafael Nadal [6]		(Russia) Daniil Medvedev [2]	
Semifinals out
(Italy) Matteo Berrettini [7]		(Greece) Stefanos Tsitsipas [4]	
Quarterfinals out
(France) Gaël Monfils [17]	(Canada) Denis Shapovalov [14]	(Italy) Jannik Sinner [11]	(Canada) Félix Auger-Aliassime [9]
4th round out
(Serbia) Miomir Kecmanović	(Spain) Pablo Carreño Busta [19]	(Germany) Alexander Zverev [3]	(France) Adrian Mannarino
(Australia) Alex de Minaur [32]	(United States) Taylor Fritz [20]	(Croatia) Marin Čilić [27]	(United States) Maxime Cressy
3rd round out
(Italy) Lorenzo Sonego [25]	(Chile) Cristian Garín [16]	(United States) Sebastian Korda	(Spain) Carlos Alcaraz [31]
(Moldova) Radu Albot (Q)	(United States) Reilly Opelka [23]	(Russia) Aslan Karatsev [18]	(Russia) Karen Khachanov [28]
(Spain) Pablo Andújar	(Japan) Taro Daniel (Q)	(Spain) Roberto Bautista Agut [15]	(France) Benoît Paire
(Russia) Andrey Rublev [5]	(United Kingdom) Dan Evans [24]	(Australia) Christopher O'Connell (WC)	(Netherlands) Botic van de Zandschulp
2nd round out
(United States) Tommy Paul	(Germany) Oscar Otte	(Kazakhstan) Alexander Bublik	(Spain) Pedro Martínez
(France) Corentin Moutet	(Netherlands) Tallon Griekspoor	(Serbia) Dušan Lajović	(United States) Stefan Kozlov (WC)
(Australia) John Millman	(Australia) Aleksandar Vukic (WC)	(Germany) Dominik Koepfer	(South Korea) Kwon Soon-woo
(Poland) Hubert Hurkacz [10]	(United States) Mackenzie McDonald	(France) Benjamin Bonzi	(Germany) Yannick Hanfmann (Q)
(Slovakia) Alex Molčan	(Poland) Kamil Majchrzak	(United Kingdom) Andy Murray (WC)	(United States) Steve Johnson
(Germany) Philipp Kohlschreiber	(United States) Frances Tiafoe	(Bulgaria) Grigor Dimitrov [26]	(Argentina) Sebastián Báez
(Lithuania) Ričardas Berankis	(Slovakia) Norbert Gombos (Q)	(France) Arthur Rinderknech	(Spain) Alejandro Davidovich Fokina
(Argentina) Diego Schwartzman [13]	(Czech Republic) Tomáš Macháč (Q)	(France) Richard Gasquet	(Australia) Nick Kyrgios
1st round out
(Italy) Salvatore Caruso (LL)	(Kazakhstan) Mikhail Kukushkin (Q)	(Chinese Taipei) Tseng Chun-hsin (WC)	(United States) Sam Querrey
(Argentina) Federico Coria	(United States) Ernesto Escobedo (LL)	(Argentina) Federico Delbonis	(Argentina) Facundo Bagnis
(United Kingdom) Cameron Norrie [12]	(France) Lucas Pouille (WC)	(Italy) Fabio Fognini	(Argentina) Tomás Martín Etcheverry (Q)
(Chile) Alejandro Tabilo (Q)	(Hungary) Márton Fucsovics	(Czech Republic) Jiří Veselý	(United States) Brandon Nakashima
(Germany) Daniel Altmaier	(Spain) Feliciano López	(Japan) Yoshihito Nishioka	(South Africa) Lloyd Harris [30]
(South Africa) Kevin Anderson	(Spain) Carlos Taberner	(Denmark) Holger Rune	(Serbia) Laslo Đere
(Belarus) Egor Gerasimov	(Australia) James Duckworth	(Serbia) Nikola Milojević (Q)	(Spain) Jaume Munar
(United States) Denis Kudla	(Germany) Peter Gojowczyk	(Australia) Thanasi Kokkinakis (WC)	(United States) Marcos Giron
(Russia) Roman Safiullin (LL)	(Bosnia and Herzegovina) Damir Džumhur (LL)	(Italy) Andreas Seppi	(Italy) Lorenzo Musetti
(Georgia (country)) Nikoloz Basilashvili [21]	(Chile) Tomás Barrios Vera (Q)	(Australia) Jordan Thompson	(Portugal) João Sousa (LL)
(Italy) Stefano Travaglia	(Italy) Marco Cecchinato	(Argentina) Marco Trungelliti (Q)	(Germany) Maximilian Marterer (Q)
(Czech Republic) Jiří Lehečka (Q)	(Brazil) Thiago Monteiro	(Spain) Albert Ramos Viñolas	(Sweden) Mikael Ymer
(Italy) Gianluca Mager	(Spain) Roberto Carballés Baena	(Kazakhstan) Timofey Skatov (Q)	(Ecuador) Emilio Gómez (Q)
(Belgium) David Goffin	(Australia) Alexei Popyrin	(Australia) Alex Bolt (WC)	(Finland) Emil Ruusuvuori
(Serbia) Filip Krajinović	(France) Hugo Gaston	(Argentina) Juan Manuel Cerúndolo	(United States) John Isner [22]
(France) Ugo Humbert [29]	(Germany) Jan-Lennard Struff	(United Kingdom) Liam Broady (Q)	(Switzerland) Henri Laaksonen

- Women's singles

Champion		Runner-up	
(Australia) Ashleigh Barty [1]		(United States) Danielle Collins [27]	
Semifinals out
(United States) Madison Keys		(Poland) Iga Świątek [7]	
Quarterfinals out
(United States) Jessica Pegula [21]	(Czech Republic) Barbora Krejčíková [4]	(France) Alizé Cornet	(Estonia) Kaia Kanepi
4th round out
(United States) Amanda Anisimova	(Greece) Maria Sakkari [5]	(Belarus) Victoria Azarenka [24]	(Spain) Paula Badosa [8]
(Belgium) Elise Mertens [19]	(Romania) Simona Halep [14]	(Romania) Sorana Cîrstea	(Belarus) Aryna Sabalenka [2]
3rd round out
(Italy) Camila Giorgi [30]	(Japan) Naomi Osaka [13]	(Spain) Nuria Párrizas Díaz	(Russia) Veronika Kudermetova [28]
(Latvia) Jeļena Ostapenko [26]	(Ukraine) Elina Svitolina [15]	(China) Wang Qiang	(Ukraine) Marta Kostyuk
(Denmark) Clara Tauson	(China) Zhang Shuai	(Montenegro) Danka Kovinić	(Slovenia) Tamara Zidanšek [29]
(Russia) Daria Kasatkina [25]	(Russia) Anastasia Pavlyuchenkova [10]	(Australia) Maddison Inglis (WC)	(Czech Republic) Markéta Vondroušová [31]
2nd round out
(Italy) Lucia Bronzetti (Q)	(Czech Republic) Tereza Martincová	(Switzerland) Belinda Bencic [22]	(United States) Madison Brengle
(Belgium) Maryna Zanevska	(United States) Bernarda Pera	(Romania) Elena-Gabriela Ruse	(China) Zheng Qinwen (Q)
(China) Wang Xiyu (WC)	(United States) Alison Riske	(Switzerland) Jil Teichmann	(France) Harmony Tan
(Romania) Jaqueline Cristian	(Belgium) Alison Van Uytvanck	(Spain) Sara Sorribes Tormo [32]	(Italy) Martina Trevisan (Q)
(Estonia) Anett Kontaveit [6]	(Croatia) Ana Konjuh	(Romania) Irina-Camelia Begu	(Kazakhstan) Elena Rybakina [12]
(Brazil) Beatriz Haddad Maia	(United Kingdom) Emma Raducanu [17]	(United Kingdom) Heather Watson	(Spain) Garbiñe Muguruza [3]
(Sweden) Rebecca Peterson	(Poland) Magda Linette	(Slovakia) Kristína Kučová	(Australia) Samantha Stosur (WC)
(Czech Republic) Marie Bouzková	(United States) Hailey Baptiste (Q)	(Russia) Liudmila Samsonova	(China) Wang Xinyu
1st round out
(Ukraine) Lesia Tsurenko (Q)	(Russia) Varvara Gracheva	(United States) Lauren Davis	(Russia) Anastasia Potapova
(France) Kristina Mladenovic	(Netherlands) Arianne Hartono (Q)	(Ukraine) Dayana Yastremska	(Colombia) Camila Osorio
(Romania) Irina Bara (LL)	(Slovenia) Kaja Juvan	(Russia) Ekaterina Alexandrova	(Ukraine) Anhelina Kalinina
(United States) Claire Liu	(Italy) Jasmine Paolini	(Belarus) Aliaksandra Sasnovich	(Germany) Tatjana Maria (PR)
(Germany) Andrea Petkovic	(Slovakia) Viktória Kužmová (Q)	(Croatia) Donna Vekić	(Slovakia) Anna Karolína Schmiedlová
(Hungary) Panna Udvardy	(Croatia) Petra Martić	(Kazakhstan) Yulia Putintseva	(France) Fiona Ferro
(United States) Sofia Kenin [11]	(Belgium) Greet Minnen	(Spain) Cristina Bucșa (Q)	(United States) Coco Gauff [18]
(Belgium) Kirsten Flipkens (PR)	(France) Diane Parry (WC)	(Japan) Nao Hibino (LL)	(Australia) Ajla Tomljanović
(Czech Republic) Kateřina Siniaková	(Australia) Astra Sharma	(United States) Shelby Rogers	(United States) Caroline Dolehide (Q)
(Russia) Vera Zvonareva	(France) Océane Dodin	(Switzerland) Viktorija Golubic	(Kazakhstan) Zarina Diyas
(Poland) Magdalena Fręch	(United States) Katie Volynets (Q)	(South Korea) Jang Su-jeong (Q)	(United States) Sloane Stephens
(Netherlands) Arantxa Rus	(Egypt) Mayar Sherif	(Bulgaria) Viktoriya Tomova (Q)	(France) Clara Burel
(United Kingdom) Harriet Dart (Q)	(Australia) Daria Saville (WC)	(Latvia) Anastasija Sevastova	(Switzerland) Stefanie Vögele (Q)
(Czech Republic) Petra Kvitová [20]	(Japan) Misaki Doi	(United States) Robin Anderson (WC)	(Hungary) Anna Bondár
(Germany) Angelique Kerber [16]	(Canada) Rebecca Marino (Q)	(France) Caroline Garcia	(Canada) Leylah Fernandez [23]
(Australia) Priscilla Hon (WC)	(United States) Emina Bektas (Q)	(United States) Ann Li	(Australia) Storm Sanders (WC)

== Events ==
=== Men's singles ===
- (Spain) Rafael Nadal def. (Russia) Daniil Medvedev, 2–6, 6–7^{(5–7)}, 6–4, 6–4, 7–5

=== Women's singles ===
- (Australia) Ashleigh Barty def. (United States) Danielle Collins, 6–3, 7–6^{(7–2)}

=== Men's doubles ===
- (Australia) Thanasi Kokkinakis / (Australia) Nick Kyrgios def. (Australia) Matthew Ebden / (Australia) Max Purcell, 7–5, 6–4

=== Women's doubles ===
- (Czech Republic) Barbora Krejčíková / (Czech Republic) Kateřina Siniaková def. (Kazakhstan) Anna Danilina / (Brazil) Beatriz Haddad Maia, 6–7^{(3–7)}, 6–4, 6–4

=== Mixed doubles ===
- (France) Kristina Mladenovic / (Croatia) Ivan Dodig def. (Australia) Jaimee Fourlis / (Australia) Jason Kubler, 6–3, 6–4

=== Wheelchair men's singles ===
- (Japan) Shingo Kunieda def. (United Kingdom) Alfie Hewett, 7–5, 3–6, 6–2

=== Wheelchair women's singles ===
- (Netherlands) Diede de Groot def. (Netherlands) Aniek van Koot, 6–1, 6–1

=== Wheelchair quad singles ===
- (Netherlands) Sam Schröder def. (Australia) Dylan Alcott, 7–5, 6–0

=== Wheelchair men's doubles ===
- (United Kingdom) Alfie Hewett / (United Kingdom) Gordon Reid def. (Argentina) Gustavo Fernández / (Japan) Shingo Kunieda, 6–2, 4–6, [10–7]

=== Wheelchair women's doubles ===
- (Netherlands) Diede de Groot / (Netherlands) Aniek van Koot def. (Japan) Yui Kamiji / (United Kingdom) Lucy Shuker, 7–5, 3–6, [10–2]

=== Wheelchair quad doubles ===
- (United Kingdom) Andy Lapthorne / (United States) David Wagner def. (Netherlands) Sam Schröder / (Netherlands) Niels Vink, 2–6, 6–4, [10–7]

=== Boys' singles ===
- (United States) Bruno Kuzuhara def. (Czech Republic) Jakub Menšík, 7–6^{(7–4)}, 6–7^{(6–8)}, 7–5

=== Girls' singles ===
- (Croatia) Petra Marčinko def. (Belgium) Sofia Costoulas, 7–5, 6–1

=== Boys' doubles ===
- (United States) Bruno Kuzuhara / (Hong Kong) Coleman Wong def. (United States) Alex Michelsen / (Paraguay) Adolfo Daniel Vallejo, 6–3, 7–6^{(7–3)}

=== Girls' doubles ===
- (United States) Clervie Ngounoue / (Russia) Diana Shnaider def. (Canada) Kayla Cross / (Canada) Victoria Mboko, 6–4, 6–3

== Point distribution and prize money ==
=== Point distribution ===
Below is a series of tables for each of the competitions showing the ranking points offered for each event.

==== Senior points ====
Event	W	F	SF	QF	Round of 16	Round of 32	Round of 64	Round of 128	Q	Q3	Q2	Q1
Men's singles	2000	1200	720	360	180	90	45	10	25	16	8	0
Men's doubles	2000	1200	720	360	180	90	0	—N/a	—N/a	—N/a	—N/a	—N/a
Women's singles	2000	1300	780	430	240	130	70	10	40	30	20	2
Women's doubles	2000	1300	780	430	240	130	10	—N/a	—N/a	—N/a	—N/a	—N/a

==== Wheelchair points ====
Event	W	F	SF/3rd	QF/4th
Singles	800	500	375	100
Doubles	800	500	100	—N/a
Quad singles	800	500	100	—N/a
Quad doubles	800	100	—N/a	—N/a

==== Junior points ====
Event	W	F	SF	QF	Round of 16	Round of 32	Q	Q3
Boys' singles	375	270	180	120	75	30	25	20
Girls' singles	375	270	180	120	75	30	25	20
Boys' doubles	270	180	120	75	45	—N/a	—N/a	—N/a
Girls' doubles	270	180	120	75	45	—N/a	—N/a	—N/a

=== Prize money ===
The Australian Open total prize money for 2022 increased by 3.5% to a tournament record A$74,000,000.

Event	W	F	SF	QF	Round of 16	Round of 32	Round of 64	Round of 128^{1}	Q3	Q2	Q1
Singles	A$2,875,000	A$1,575,000	A$895,000	A$538,500	A$328,000	A$221,000	A$154,000	A$103,000	A$53,500	A$35,500	A$25,250
Doubles *	A$675,000	A$360,000	A$205,000	A$113,000	A$65,250	A$45,100	A$30,050	—N/a	—N/a	—N/a	—N/a
Mixed doubles *	A$190,000	A$100,000	A$50,000	A$24,000	A$12,000	A$6,250	—N/a	—N/a	—N/a	—N/a	—N/a

== Djokovic's vaccination and visa controversy ==
On 4 January 2022, defending champion Novak Djokovic announced that he could compete in the Australian Open after he had been granted medical exemption from mandatory COVID-19 vaccination by Tennis Australia and the health department of the state of Victoria, after a blind review of his application. However, the Australian Minister for Home Affairs, Karen Andrews, stated that regardless of Tennis Australia and Victoria's decision, Australia's border requirements would be still enforced by the federal government, namely that unvaccinated individuals entering Australia "must provide acceptable proof that they cannot be vaccinated for medical reasons".

On 5 January, Djokovic was detained by the Australian Border Force upon arriving in Australia and being determined to not meet the entry requirements for unvaccinated travellers. His lawyers requested an injunction against deportation in order to appeal the visa refusal; this allowed Djokovic to remain confined in a detention hotel pending the outcome of the appeal. On 10 January, the Federal Circuit and Family Court ruled against the government on procedural grounds, ordered his release from detention and directed the federal government to pay his legal expenses. The reason for the ruling was that when Djokovic was in immigration holding before his visa was cancelled, Australian officials reneged on an agreement to give Djokovic sufficient time to contact his lawyers and tennis authorities before his official interview; this led the Australian government to concede they treated Djokovic unreasonably.

Djokovic's travel declaration on entry to Australia erroneously stated that he had not travelled anywhere else in the previous 14 days. There was additional controversy due to his meetings with a photographer and children after he claimed to have tested positive, and discrepancies discovered in his COVID test documents, which he had hoped to use to obtain an exemption.

Twenty-five other players and staff had applied for a medical exemption and a handful of applications had been granted. Among those, two people with the same type of visa and exemption as Djokovic had reportedly been allowed into the country. Player Renata Voráčová was one of those granted an exemption and allowed into the country. She had participated in a warm-up tournament but was subsequently detained in the same hotel as Djokovic and deported on 8 January 2022. Filip Serdarušić, a tennis coach with the same exemption, was also allowed entry but left the country voluntarily.

Public opinion in Australia of an unvaccinated athlete being permitted to participate in an event that spectators could not attend unless fully vaccinated was overwhelmingly negative. Another concern was that Djokovic should not be given entry while many Australians remained stranded overseas due to the pandemic. A poll jointly published by newspapers The Herald Sun and The Age showed that 71% of respondents did not want Djokovic to be allowed to stay. The furore that unfolded in the media over the issue achieved worldwide attention.

On 14 January 2022, Alex Hawke, the Australian Minister for Immigration, Citizenship, Migrant Services and Multicultural Affairs, exercised his ministerial powers under sections 133C(3) and 116(1)(e)(i) of the Migration Act 1958 to cancel Djokovic's visa, citing "health and good order grounds, on the basis that it was in the public interest to do so". An application for review of the decision was made in the Federal Court, but was dismissed on 16 January, ruling out Djokovic's participation. Djokovic said he was "extremely disappointed" with the decision but accepted the ruling, and flew out of Australia that night. Salvatore Caruso, ranked 150 in the world, took his place in the draw as the "lucky loser".

Preceded by 2021 US Open	Grand Slams	Succeeded by 2022 French Open
