= 2022 Australian Open – Wheelchair quad singles =

Wheelchair quad singles
- 2022 Australian Open

Final
- Champion: (Netherlands) Sam Schröder
- Runner-up: (Australia) Dylan Alcott
- Score: 7–5, 6–0

Events
Singles	men	women		boys	girls
Doubles	men	women	mixed	boys	girls
WC Singles	men	women	quad	boys	girls
WC Doubles	men	women	quad	boys	girls
- Australian Open

Sam Schröder defeated the seven-time defending champion Dylan Alcott in the final, 7–5, 6–0 to win the quad singles wheelchair tennis title at the 2022 Australian Open. It marked Alcott's final professional appearance. The final was played in the Rod Laver Arena.

== Seeds ==
1. (Australia) Dylan Alcott (final)
2. (Netherlands) Sam Schröder (champion)

== Draw ==
Key

- Q = Qualifier
- WC = Wild card
- LL = Lucky loser
- Alt = Alternate
- ITF = ITF entry
- PR = Protected ranking
- SR = Special ranking
- SE = Special exempt
- JE = Junior exempt
- JR = Junior Accelerator Programme entrant
- CO = College Accelerator Programme entrant
- NG = Next Gen Accelerator Program entrant
- w/o = Walkover
- r = Retired
- d = Defaulted

=== Bracket ===
Quarterfinals
1	(Australia) Dylan Alcott	6^{1}	6	6
(Netherlands) Niels Vink	7^{7}	4	2
(United Kingdom) Andy Lapthorne	7	6
WC	(South Africa) Donald Ramphadi	5	3
(Australia) Heath Davidson	6	6
(Japan) Koji Sugeno	2	2
(United States) David Wagner	1	3
2	(Netherlands) Sam Schröder	6	6

Semifinals
1	(Australia) Dylan Alcott	6	6
(United Kingdom) Andy Lapthorne	3	0
(Australia) Heath Davidson	1	2
2	(Netherlands) Sam Schröder	6	6

Final
1	(Australia) Dylan Alcott	5	0
2	(Netherlands) Sam Schröder	7	6
