= 2022 Australian Open – Mixed doubles =

Mixed doubles
- 2022 Australian Open

Final
- Champions: (France) Kristina Mladenovic (Croatia) Ivan Dodig
- Runners-up: (Australia) Jaimee Fourlis (Australia) Jason Kubler
- Score: 6–3, 6–4

Details
- Draw: 32
- Seeds: 8

Events
Singles	men	women		boys	girls
Doubles	men	women	mixed	boys	girls
WC Singles	men	women	quad	boys	girls
WC Doubles	men	women	quad	boys	girls
- Australian Open

Kristina Mladenovic and Ivan Dodig defeated Jaimee Fourlis and Jason Kubler in the final, 6–3, 6–4 to win the mixed doubles tennis title at the 2022 Australian Open. Though it was their first major title as a team, the win earned Mladenovic her third mixed doubles title and Dodig his fourth.

Barbora Krejčíková and Rajeev Ram were the defending champions, but the three-time defending champion Krejčíková chose not to defend her title. Ram partnered alongside Sania Mirza, but they lost to Fourlis and Kubler in the quarterfinals.

Desirae Krawczyk was attempting to complete the first non-calendar-year Grand Slam in Mixed doubles since Billie Jean King in 1968 and would be the first in the Open Era, having won the French Open, Wimbledon and the US Open in 2021. However, she and her partner Joe Salisbury lost in the first round to Giuliana Olmos and Marcelo Arévalo.

== Seeds ==
1. (United States) Desirae Krawczyk / (United Kingdom) Joe Salisbury (first round)
2. (China) Zhang Shuai / (Australia) John Peers (semifinals)
3. (United States) Nicole Melichar-Martinez / (Colombia) Robert Farah (first round)
4. (Chile) Alexa Guarachi / (Germany) Tim Pütz (second round)
5. (France) Kristina Mladenovic / (Croatia) Ivan Dodig (champions)
6. (United States) Caty McNally / (United Kingdom) Jamie Murray (withdrew)
7. (Serbia) Nina Stojanović / (Croatia) Mate Pavić (first round)
8. (Japan) Ena Shibahara / (Japan) Ben McLachlan (quarterfinals)

== Draw ==
Key

- Q = Qualifier
- WC = Wild card
- LL = Lucky loser
- Alt = Alternate
- ITF = ITF entry
- PR = Protected ranking
- SR = Special ranking
- SE = Special exempt
- JE = Junior exempt
- JR = Junior Accelerator Programme entrant
- CO = College Accelerator Programme entrant
- NG = Next Gen Accelerator Program entrant
- w/o = Walkover
- r = Retired
- d = Defaulted

=== Finals ===
Semifinals
(Czech Republic) Lucie Hradecká (Ecuador) Gonzalo Escobar	6	6^{2}	[6]
WC	(Australia) Jaimee Fourlis (Australia) Jason Kubler	2	7^{7}	[10]
5	(France) Kristina Mladenovic (Croatia) Ivan Dodig	1	7	[10]
2	(China) Zhang Shuai (Australia) John Peers	6	5	[2]

Final
WC	(Australia) Jaimee Fourlis (Australia) Jason Kubler	3	4
5	(France) Kristina Mladenovic (Croatia) Ivan Dodig	6	6

=== Top half ===
First round
1	(United States) D Krawczyk (United Kingdom) J Salisbury	7^{9}	4	[5]
(Mexico) G Olmos (El Salvador) M Arévalo	6^{7}	6	[10]
WC	(Australia) A Sharma (Australia) J-P Smith	3	4
(Czech Republic) L Hradecká (Ecuador) G Escobar	6	6
(Croatia) D Jurak Schreiber (India) R Bopanna	6	4	[9]
(Ukraine) L Kichenok (Kazakhstan) A Golubev	1	6	[11]
(United States) J Pegula (United States) A Krajicek	4	3
Alt	(Japan) M Ninomiya (Pakistan) A-u-H Qureshi	6	6
3	(United States) N Melichar-Martinez (Colombia) R Farah	4	4
WC	(Australia) E Perez (Netherlands) M Middelkoop	6	6
(India) S Mirza (United States) R Ram	6	7^{7}
Alt	(Serbia) A Krunić (Serbia) N Ćaćić	3	6^{3}
WC	(Australia) S Stosur (Australia) M Ebden	6	7^{7}
(United States) A Muhammad (France) F Martin	2	6^{3}
WC	(Australia) J Fourlis (Australia) J Kubler	3	6	[17]
7	(Serbia) N Stojanović (Croatia) M Pavić	6	3	[15]

Second round
(Mexico) G Olmos (El Salvador) M Arévalo	4	4
(Czech Republic) L Hradecká (Ecuador) G Escobar	6	6
(Ukraine) L Kichenok (Kazakhstan) A Golubev	3	4
Alt	(Japan) M Ninomiya (Pakistan) A-u-H Qureshi	6	6
WC	(Australia) E Perez (Netherlands) M Middelkoop	6^{6}	4
(India) S Mirza (United States) R Ram	7^{8}	6
WC	(Australia) S Stosur (Australia) M Ebden	6	5	[9]
WC	(Australia) J Fourlis (Australia) J Kubler	3	7	[11]

Quarterfinals
(Czech Republic) L Hradecká (Ecuador) G Escobar	7	7
Alt	(Japan) M Ninomiya (Pakistan) A-u-H Qureshi	5	5
(India) S Mirza (United States) R Ram	4	6^{5}
WC	(Australia) J Fourlis (Australia) J Kubler	6	7^{7}

Semifinals
(Czech Republic) L Hradecká (Ecuador) G Escobar	6	6^{2}	[6]
WC	(Australia) J Fourlis (Australia) J Kubler	2	7^{7}	[10]

=== Bottom half ===
First round
5	(France) K Mladenovic (Croatia) I Dodig	6^{4}	6	[10]
(Belgium) K Flipkens (Belgium) S Gillé	7^{7}	4	[3]
WC	(Australia) Ar Rodionova (Australia) M Polmans	4	6	[10]
(Colombia) C Osorio (Colombia) JS Cabal	6	3	[7]
(New Zealand) E Routliffe (New Zealand) M Venus	6^{5}	7	[13]
WC	(Australia) L Cabrera (Australia) A Bolt	7^{7}	5	[11]
WC	(Australia) D Saville (Australia) L Saville	6^{5}	5
4	(Chile) A Guarachi (Germany) T Pütz	7^{7}	7
8	(Japan) E Shibahara (Japan) B McLachlan	6	7^{10}
(Australia) S Sanders (United Kingdom) N Skupski	3	6^{8}
WC	(Czech Republic) K Siniaková (Czech Republic) T Macháč	5	6	[7]
(Ukraine) N Kichenok (Mexico) S González	7	4	[10]
(United States) B Pera (Netherlands) W Koolhof	7	6
(Canada) G Dabrowski (Monaco) H Nys	5	3
(Slovenia) A Klepač (Belgium) J Vliegen	1	4
2	(China) S Zhang (Australia) J Peers	6	6

Second round
5	(France) K Mladenovic (Croatia) I Dodig	6	6^{8}	[10]
WC	(Australia) Ar Rodionova (Australia) M Polmans	2	7^{10}	[8]
(New Zealand) E Routliffe (New Zealand) M Venus	6	7
4	(Chile) A Guarachi (Germany) T Pütz	3	5
8	(Japan) E Shibahara (Japan) B McLachlan	4	6	[10]
(Ukraine) N Kichenok (Mexico) S González	6	3	[8]
(United States) B Pera (Netherlands) W Koolhof	5	3
2	(China) S Zhang (Australia) J Peers	7	6

Quarterfinals
5	(France) K Mladenovic (Croatia) I Dodig	6	6
(New Zealand) E Routliffe (New Zealand) M Venus	4	2
8	(Japan) E Shibahara (Japan) B McLachlan	4	4
2	(China) S Zhang (Australia) J Peers	6	6

Semifinals
5	(France) K Mladenovic (Croatia) I Dodig	1	7	[10]
2	(China) S Zhang (Australia) J Peers	6	5	[2]

== Other entry information ==
=== Wild cards ===
- (Australia) Lizette Cabrera / (Australia) Alex Bolt
- (Australia) Jaimee Fourlis / (Australia) Jason Kubler
- (Australia) Ellen Perez / (Netherlands) Matwé Middelkoop
- (Australia) Arina Rodionova / (Australia) Marc Polmans
- (Australia) Daria Saville / (Australia) Luke Saville
- (Australia) Astra Sharma / (Australia) John-Patrick Smith
- (Czech Republic) Kateřina Siniaková / (Czech Republic) Tomáš Macháč
- (Australia) Samantha Stosur / (Australia) Matthew Ebden

=== Alternate pairs ===
- (Serbia) Aleksandra Krunić / (Serbia) Nikola Ćaćić
- (Japan) Makoto Ninomiya / (Pakistan) Aisam-ul-Haq Qureshi

=== Withdrawals ===
Before the tournament

- (Switzerland) Belinda Bencic / (Slovakia) Filip Polášek → replaced by (Serbia) Aleksandra Krunić / (Serbia) Nikola Ćaćić
- (United States) Caty McNally / (United Kingdom) Jamie Murray → replaced by (Japan) Makoto Ninomiya / (Pakistan) Aisam-ul-Haq Qureshi
