= 2022 Australian Open – Wheelchair men's doubles =

Wheelchair men's doubles
- 2022 Australian Open

Final
- Champions: (United Kingdom) Alfie Hewett (United Kingdom) Gordon Reid
- Runners-up: (Argentina) Gustavo Fernández (Japan) Shingo Kunieda
- Score: 6–2, 4–6, [10–7]

Events
Singles	men	women		boys	girls
Doubles	men	women	mixed	boys	girls
WC Singles	men	women	quad
WC Doubles	men	women	quad
← 2021 ·	Australian Open	· 2023 →

Two-time defending champions Alfie Hewett and Gordon Reid defeated Gustavo Fernández and Shingo Kunieda in the final, 6–2, 4–6, [10–7] to win the men's doubles wheelchair tennis title at the 2022 Australian Open.

== Seeds ==
1. (United Kingdom) Alfie Hewett / (United Kingdom) Gordon Reid (champions)
2. (Belgium) Joachim Gérard / (France) Stéphane Houdet (semifinals)

== Draw ==
=== Key ===
- Q = Qualifier
- WC = Wild card
- LL = Lucky loser
- Alt = Alternate
- ITF = ITF entry
- PR = Protected ranking
- SR = Special ranking
- SE = Special exempt
- JE = Junior exempt
- JR = Junior Accelerator Programme entrant
- CO = College Accelerator Programme entrant
- NG = Next Gen Accelerator Program entrant
- w/o = Walkover
- r = Retired
- d = Defaulted

=== Bracket ===
Semifinals
1	(United Kingdom) Alfie Hewett (United Kingdom) Gordon Reid	7	6
(Netherlands) Tom Egberink (Australia) Ben Weekes	5	2
(Argentina) Gustavo Fernández (Japan) Shingo Kunieda	6	6
2	(Belgium) Joachim Gérard (France) Stéphane Houdet	3	2

Final
1	(United Kingdom) Alfie Hewett (United Kingdom) Gordon Reid	6	4	[10]
(Argentina) Gustavo Fernández (Japan) Shingo Kunieda	2	6	[7]
