= 2022 Australian Open – Wheelchair men's singles =

Wheelchair men's singles
- 2022 Australian Open

Final
- Champion: (Japan) Shingo Kunieda
- Runner-up: (United Kingdom) Alfie Hewett
- Score: 7–5, 3–6, 6–2

Events
Singles	men	women		boys	girls
Doubles	men	women	mixed	boys	girls
WC Singles	men	women	quad	boys	girls
WC Doubles	men	women	quad	boys	girls
- Australian Open

Shingo Kunieda defeated Alfie Hewett in the final, 7–5, 3–6, 6–2 to win the men's singles wheelchair title at the 2022 Australian Open. It was his eleventh Australian Open singles title and his record-extending 26th major singles title overall.

Joachim Gérard was the defending champion, but was defeated by Kunieda in the quarterfinals.

== Seeds ==
1. (Japan) Shingo Kunieda (champion)
2. (United Kingdom) Alfie Hewett (final)

== Draw ==
Key

- Q = Qualifier
- WC = Wild card
- LL = Lucky loser
- Alt = Alternate
- ITF = ITF entry
- PR = Protected ranking
- SR = Special ranking
- SE = Special exempt
- JE = Junior exempt
- JR = Junior Accelerator Programme entrant
- CO = College Accelerator Programme entrant
- NG = Next Gen Accelerator Program entrant
- w/o = Walkover
- r = Retired
- d = Defaulted

=== Bracket ===
Quarterfinals
1	(Japan) Shingo Kunieda	6	6
(Belgium) Joachim Gérard	4	2
(Netherlands) Tom Egberink	6	6
WC	(Australia) Ben Weekes	1	1
(France) Stéphane Houdet	6	6
(United Kingdom) Gordon Reid	4	1
(Argentina) Gustavo Fernández	1	6^{2}
2	(United Kingdom) Alfie Hewett	6	7^{7}

Semifinals
1	(Japan) Shingo Kunieda	5	6	6
(Netherlands) Tom Egberink	7	3	4
(France) Stéphane Houdet	1	1
2	(United Kingdom) Alfie Hewett	6	6

Final
1	(Japan) Shingo Kunieda	7	3	6
2	(United Kingdom) Alfie Hewett	5	6	2
