= 2022 French Open – Men's singles qualifying =

Men's singles qualifying
- 2022 French Open

Events
Singles	men	women		boys	girls
Doubles	men	women	mixed	boys	girls
WC Singles	men	women	quad
WC Doubles	men	women	quad
Legends	men	women

Qualification
Singles	men	women
← 2021 ·	French Open	· 2023 →

The 2022 French Open – Men's singles qualifying are a series of tennis matches that takes place from 16 to 20 May 2022 to determine the sixteen qualifiers into the main draw of the 2022 French Open – Men's singles, and, if necessary, the lucky losers.

The losses of Feliciano López and Andreas Seppi in the first round (against Gian Marco Moroni and Giulio Zeppieri respectively) ended their streaks of consecutive appearances in the main draws of Grand Slam singles events at 79 and 66 — the longest and third longest streaks, respectively, in the Open Era.

== Seeds ==
1. (Brazil) Thiago Monteiro (first round)
2. (Colombia) Daniel Elahi Galán (first round)
3. (United States) Sam Querrey (first round)
4. (Spain) Feliciano López (first round)
5. (Spain) Fernando Verdasco (second round)
6. (Moldova) Radu Albot (second round)
7. (Italy) Gianluca Mager (first round)
8. (Spain) Bernabé Zapata Miralles (qualified)
9. (Germany) Yannick Hanfmann (first round)
10. (Slovakia) Norbert Gombos (qualified)
11. (Chinese Taipei) Tseng Chun-hsin (qualified)
12. (Peru) Juan Pablo Varillas (qualified)
13. (United States) Stefan Kozlov (first round)
14. (United States) Jack Sock (first round)
15. (Germany) Mats Moraing (first round)
16. (Switzerland) Marc-Andrea Hüsler (first round)
17. (Argentina) Juan Manuel Cerúndolo (second round)
18. (Australia) Aleksandar Vukic (second round)
19. (Austria) Jurij Rodionov (second round)
20. (Portugal) Nuno Borges (qualified)
21. (United States) Ernesto Escobedo (second round, retired)
22. (Chile) Tomás Barrios Vera (second round)
23. (Czech Republic) Zdeněk Kolář (qualified)
24. (Italy) Andreas Seppi (first round)
25. (Chile) Nicolás Jarry (qualifying competition)
26. (Sweden) Elias Ymer (first round)
27. (Austria) Dennis Novak (first round)
28. (Argentina) Juan Ignacio Londero (qualifying competition, lucky loser)
29. (United Kingdom) Liam Broady (second round)
30. (Germany) Philipp Kohlschreiber (first round)
31. (Slovakia) Andrej Martin (first round)
32. (United States) Mitchell Krueger (first round)

== Qualifiers ==
1. Andrey Kuznetsov
2. (Czech Republic) Zdeněk Kolář
3. (Portugal) Nuno Borges
4. Pavel Kotov
5. (Argentina) Camilo Ugo Carabelli
6. (Australia) Jason Kubler
7. (Croatia) Borna Gojo
8. (Spain) Bernabé Zapata Miralles
9. (Italy) Giulio Zeppieri
10. (Slovakia) Norbert Gombos
11. (Chinese Taipei) Tseng Chun-hsin
12. (Peru) Juan Pablo Varillas
13. (United States) Bjorn Fratangelo
14. (France) Geoffrey Blancaneaux
15. (Austria) Sebastian Ofner
16. (Argentina) Santiago Rodríguez Taverna

== Lucky losers ==
1. (Italy) Franco Agamenone
2. (Argentina) Pedro Cachín
3. (Argentina) Juan Ignacio Londero
4. (Italy) Alessandro Giannessi

== Draw ==
=== First qualifier ===
First round
1	(Brazil) Thiago Monteiro	6	6^{5}	6^{8}
(United States) Tennys Sandgren	3	7^{7}	7^{10}
(United Kingdom) Ryan Peniston	2	2
Andrey Kuznetsov	6	6
(France) Antoine Escoffier	4	3
(Argentina) Marco Trungelliti	6	6
(Slovakia) Jozef Kovalík	6	4	4
22	(Chile) Tomás Barrios Vera	4	6	6

Second round
(United States) Tennys Sandgren	1	6^{4}
Andrey Kuznetsov	6	7^{7}
(Argentina) Marco Trungelliti	6	6
22	(Chile) Tomás Barrios Vera	3	4

Qualifying competition
Andrey Kuznetsov	6	4	6
(Argentina) Marco Trungelliti	4	6	2

=== Second qualifier ===
First round
2	(Colombia) Daniel Elahi Galán	5	6	3
(Italy) Franco Agamenone	7	3	6
(France) Alexandre Müller	6	6
(Turkey) Cem İlkel	0	1
(Turkey) Altuğ Çelikbilek	6	7
PR	(India) Yuki Bhambri	3	5
(Italy) Federico Gaio	1	6^{7}
23	(Czech Republic) Zdeněk Kolář	6	7^{9}

Second round
(Italy) Franco Agamenone	7^{8}	6
(France) Alexandre Müller	6^{6}	2
(Turkey) Altuğ Çelikbilek	4	7^{7}	1
23	(Czech Republic) Zdeněk Kolář	6	6^{4}	6

Qualifying competition
(Italy) Franco Agamenone	3	4
23	(Czech Republic) Zdeněk Kolář	6	6

=== Third qualifier ===
First round
3	(United States) Sam Querrey	2	2
(Hungary) Zsombor Piros	6	6
(Serbia) Nikola Milojević	5	6	2
Egor Gerasimov	7	2	6
(Brazil) Felipe Meligeni Alves	6	6
PR	(United States) Bradley Klahn	3	3
(Italy) Thomas Fabbiano	3	6	2
20	(Portugal) Nuno Borges	6	1	6

Second round
(Hungary) Zsombor Piros	6	6
Egor Gerasimov	4	4
(Brazil) Felipe Meligeni Alves	7^{7}	6^{3}	2
20	(Portugal) Nuno Borges	6^{5}	7^{7}	6

Qualifying competition
(Hungary) Zsombor Piros	6	2	1
20	(Portugal) Nuno Borges	3	6	6

=== Fourth qualifier ===
First round
4	(Spain) Feliciano López	1	6^{4}
(Italy) Gian Marco Moroni	6	7^{7}
(Argentina) Pedro Cachín	6	6
PR	(India) Sumit Nagal	2	2
(France) Hugo Grenier	3	4
Pavel Kotov	6	6
(Germany) Maximilian Marterer	6	3	5
19	(Austria) Jurij Rodionov	4	6	7

Second round
(Italy) Gian Marco Moroni	6^{0}	3
(Argentina) Pedro Cachín	7^{7}	6
Pavel Kotov	7^{9}	6
19	(Austria) Jurij Rodionov	6^{7}	4

Qualifying competition
(Argentina) Pedro Cachín	3	2
Pavel Kotov	6	6

=== Fifth qualifier ===
First round
5	(Spain) Fernando Verdasco	6	5	6
(Bosnia and Herzegovina) Damir Džumhur	2	7	1
(Switzerland) Alexander Ritschard	2	6	6
WC	(France) Laurent Lokoli	6	4	4
PR	(Japan) Yūichi Sugita	4	4
(Argentina) Camilo Ugo Carabelli	6	6
Evgeny Donskoy	3	5
21	(United States) Ernesto Escobedo	6	7

Second round
5	(Spain) Fernando Verdasco	2	6	3
(Switzerland) Alexander Ritschard	6	3	6
(Argentina) Camilo Ugo Carabelli	4
21	(United States) Ernesto Escobedo	1^{r}

Qualifying competition
(Switzerland) Alexander Ritschard	6^{6}	2
(Argentina) Camilo Ugo Carabelli	7^{8}	6

=== Sixth qualifier ===
First round
6	(Moldova) Radu Albot	3	6	6
(Brazil) Matheus Pucinelli de Almeida	6	3	3
(Australia) Jason Kubler	6	3	6
(Italy) Riccardo Bonadio	4	6	3
PR	(Portugal) Pedro Sousa	6^{5}	6	7^{10}
(Australia) Max Purcell	7^{7}	4	6^{8}
(Italy) Lorenzo Giustino	7	7^{7}
27	(Austria) Dennis Novak	5	6^{4}

Second round
6	(Moldova) Radu Albot	6	6^{5}	6^{4}
(Australia) Jason Kubler	3	7^{7}	7^{10}
PR	(Portugal) Pedro Sousa	6	6
(Italy) Lorenzo Giustino	4	1

Qualifying competition
(Australia) Jason Kubler	7	6
PR	(Portugal) Pedro Sousa	5	2

=== Seventh qualifier ===
First round
7	(Italy) Gianluca Mager	7^{7}	2	4
(Croatia) Borna Gojo	6^{3}	6	6
(Czech Republic) Dalibor Svrčina	3	6	3
(Argentina) Facundo Mena	6	3	6
(Switzerland) Dominic Stricker	6	6
PR	(Brazil) João Menezes	4	0
(Kazakhstan) Dmitry Popko	4	4
28	(Argentina) Juan Ignacio Londero	6	6

Second round
(Croatia) Borna Gojo	6	6
(Argentina) Facundo Mena	3	3
(Switzerland) Dominic Stricker	5	6	0
28	(Argentina) Juan Ignacio Londero	7	4	6

Qualifying competition
(Croatia) Borna Gojo	7^{7}	6
28	(Argentina) Juan Ignacio Londero	6^{1}	1

=== Eighth qualifier ===
First round
8	(Spain) Bernabé Zapata Miralles	6	6
PR	(Israel) Dudi Sela	3	0
(Portugal) Gastão Elias	6	6^{5}	7
(Argentina) Nicolás Kicker	4	7^{7}	5
(United Kingdom) Paul Jubb	6	6^{6}	7^{10}
(United States) Christopher Eubanks	2	7^{8}	6^{4}
(Italy) Luca Nardi	7^{7}	5	6
31	(Slovakia) Andrej Martin	6^{3}	7	3

Second round
8	(Spain) Bernabé Zapata Miralles	6	6
(Portugal) Gastão Elias	1	1
(United Kingdom) Paul Jubb	4	1
(Italy) Luca Nardi	6	6

Qualifying competition
8	(Spain) Bernabé Zapata Miralles	3	6	6
(Italy) Luca Nardi	6	4	1

=== Ninth qualifier ===
First round
9	(Germany) Yannick Hanfmann	3	2
(India) Ramkumar Ramanathan	6	6
WC	(France) Clément Tabur	4	7^{7}	4
WC	(France) Sean Cuenin	6	6^{3}	6
(Romania) Marius Copil	6	6
WC	(France) Evan Furness	4	4
(Italy) Giulio Zeppieri	6	6
24	(Italy) Andreas Seppi	3	4

Second round
(India) Ramkumar Ramanathan	6^{6}	4
WC	(France) Sean Cuenin	7^{8}	6
(Romania) Marius Copil	2	3
(Italy) Giulio Zeppieri	6	6

Qualifying competition
WC	(France) Sean Cuenin	3	4
(Italy) Giulio Zeppieri	6	6

=== Tenth qualifier ===
First round
10	(Slovakia) Norbert Gombos	3	6	7
(France) Constant Lestienne	6	2	5
WC	(France) Arthur Fils	7^{7}	5	3^{r}
WC	(France) Gabriel Debru	6^{5}	7	5
(Netherlands) Tim van Rijthoven	6	6
(Ecuador) Emilio Gómez	4	2
(France) Enzo Couacaud	6	7^{7}
30	(Germany) Philipp Kohlschreiber	4	6^{2}

Second round
10	(Slovakia) Norbert Gombos	6	7^{7}
WC	(France) Gabriel Debru	4	6^{5}
(Netherlands) Tim van Rijthoven	6	7
(France) Enzo Couacaud	4	5

Qualifying competition
10	(Slovakia) Norbert Gombos	7^{8}	7^{7}
(Netherlands) Tim van Rijthoven	6^{6}	6^{5}

=== Eleventh qualifier ===
First round
11	(Chinese Taipei) Tseng Chun-hsin	6	6
WC	(France) Arthur Cazaux	1	1
(Chinese Taipei) Jason Jung	6	7^{10}
(Belgium) Zizou Bergs	4	6^{8}
(Germany) Cedrik-Marcel Stebe	3	6	6
(Poland) Kacper Żuk	6	1	4
WC	(France) Luca Van Assche	3	3
17	(Argentina) Juan Manuel Cerúndolo	6	6

Second round
11	(Chinese Taipei) Tseng Chun-hsin	7	6
(Chinese Taipei) Jason Jung	5	4
(Germany) Cedrik-Marcel Stebe	7^{7}	6
17	(Argentina) Juan Manuel Cerúndolo	6^{5}	3

Qualifying competition
11	(Chinese Taipei) Tseng Chun-hsin	6	6
(Germany) Cedrik-Marcel Stebe	3	3

=== Twelfth qualifier ===
First round
12	(Peru) Juan Pablo Varillas	6	6
(Chinese Taipei) Wu Tung-lin	3	2
Roman Safiullin	2	7^{7}	3
(Croatia) Duje Ajduković	6	6^{1}	6
(Italy) Salvatore Caruso	6	7
(Italy) Andrea Arnaboldi	4	5
(Slovakia) Lukáš Lacko	6^{3}	3
25	(Chile) Nicolás Jarry	7^{7}	6

Second round
12	(Peru) Juan Pablo Varillas	6	6
(Croatia) Duje Ajduković	2	1
(Italy) Salvatore Caruso	6^{3}	6	3
25	(Chile) Nicolás Jarry	7^{7}	4	6

Qualifying competition
12	(Peru) Juan Pablo Varillas	5	6	7^{10}
25	(Chile) Nicolás Jarry	7	4	6^{5}

=== Thirteenth qualifier ===
First round
13	(United States) Stefan Kozlov	5	0
(Croatia) Nino Serdarušić	7	6
(Italy) Andrea Vavassori	6	3	6
(France) Antoine Hoang	3	6	4
(Brazil) Thiago Seyboth Wild	4	6	2
(United States) Bjorn Fratangelo	6	4	6
(Argentina) Juan Pablo Ficovich	3	6	6
26	(Sweden) Elias Ymer	6	4	1

Second round
(Croatia) Nino Serdarušić	7^{7}	3	7^{10}
(Italy) Andrea Vavassori	6^{4}	6	6^{8}
(United States) Bjorn Fratangelo	6	6
(Argentina) Juan Pablo Ficovich	1	2

Qualifying competition
(Croatia) Nino Serdarušić	5	4
(United States) Bjorn Fratangelo	7	6

=== Fourteenth qualifier ===
First round
14	(United States) Jack Sock	6^{6}	4
(Germany) Daniel Masur	7^{8}	6
(Netherlands) Jesper de Jong	6	6
(Czech Republic) Vít Kopřiva	2	3
(France) Geoffrey Blancaneaux	6	6
(Bosnia and Herzegovina) Mirza Bašić	4	3
(Argentina) Renzo Olivo	0	6	0
29	(United Kingdom) Liam Broady	6	4	6

Second round
(Germany) Daniel Masur	4	6	7^{10}
(Netherlands) Jesper de Jong	6	4	6^{3}
(France) Geoffrey Blancaneaux	6	6^{2}	6
29	(United Kingdom) Liam Broady	1	7^{7}	4

Qualifying competition
(Germany) Daniel Masur	1	3
(France) Geoffrey Blancaneaux	6	6

=== Fifteenth qualifier ===
First round
15	(Germany) Mats Moraing	6^{6}	0
(Italy) Alessandro Giannessi	7^{8}	6
(France) Pierre-Hugues Herbert	4	6	2
(Argentina) Thiago Agustín Tirante	6	1	6
(United Kingdom) Jay Clarke	4	4
(Austria) Sebastian Ofner	6	6
(Spain) Mario Vilella Martínez	5	4
18	(Australia) Aleksandar Vukic	7	6

Second round
(Italy) Alessandro Giannessi	7	6
(Argentina) Thiago Agustín Tirante	5	2
(Austria) Sebastian Ofner	6	6
18	(Australia) Aleksandar Vukic	2	4

Qualifying competition
(Italy) Alessandro Giannessi	4	6	2
(Austria) Sebastian Ofner	6	1	6

=== Sixteenth qualifier ===
First round
16	(Switzerland) Marc-Andrea Hüsler	5	3
(Bulgaria) Dimitar Kuzmanov	7	6
WC	(France) Sascha Gueymard Wayenburg	3	4
(Italy) Flavio Cobolli	6	6
(Argentina) Santiago Rodríguez Taverna	4	6	6
(Slovakia) Filip Horanský	6	2	3
(Kazakhstan) Timofey Skatov	6	6
32	(United States) Mitchell Krueger	1	0

Second round
(Bulgaria) Dimitar Kuzmanov	6	3	6
(Italy) Flavio Cobolli	3	6	3
(Argentina) Santiago Rodríguez Taverna	7	6
(Kazakhstan) Timofey Skatov	5	1

Qualifying competition
(Bulgaria) Dimitar Kuzmanov	4	6	3
(Argentina) Santiago Rodríguez Taverna	6	3	6
