= 2022 Australian Open – Women's singles qualifying =

Women's singles qualifying
- 2022 Australian Open

Events
Singles	men	women		boys	girls
Doubles	men	women	mixed	boys	girls
WC Singles	men	women	quad	boys	girls
WC Doubles	men	women	quad	boys	girls

Qualification
Singles	men	women
- Australian Open

This article shows the qualifying draw for women's singles at the 2022 Australian Open.

== Seeds ==
1. (Russia) Anna Kalinskaya (first round)
2. (Italy) Martina Trevisan (qualified)
3. (China) Zhu Lin (first round)
4. (Serbia) Nina Stojanović (second round)
5. (Bulgaria) Viktoriya Tomova (qualified)
6. (Ukraine) Lesia Tsurenko (qualified)
7. (France) Chloé Paquet (first round)
8. (Russia) Kamilla Rakhimova (qualifying competition)
9. (Italy) Sara Errani (first round)
10. (Romania) Mihaela Buzărnescu (first round)
11. (United Kingdom) Harriet Dart (qualified)
12. (Hungary) Dalma Gálfi (second round)
13. (China) Zheng Qinwen (qualified)
14. (Serbia) Aleksandra Krunić (first round)
15. (Japan) Nao Hibino (qualifying competition; lucky loser)
16. (Russia) Anastasia Gasanova (first round)
17. (Germany) Jule Niemeier (qualifying competition)
18. (Romania) Irina Bara (qualifying competition; lucky loser)
19. (Belarus) Olga Govortsova (qualifying competition)
20. (Germany) Anna-Lena Friedsam (first round)
21. (United States) Caty McNally (second round)
22. (Georgia (country)) Ekaterine Gorgodze (second round)
23. (Ukraine) Kateryna Baindl (second round)
24. (Canada) Rebecca Marino (qualified)
25. (Switzerland) Stefanie Vögele (qualified)
26. (Italy) Lucia Bronzetti (qualified)
27. (United Kingdom) Katie Boulter (first round)
28. (Japan) Mai Hontama (qualifying competition)
29. (United Kingdom) Francesca Jones (first round, retired)
30. (Australia) Arina Rodionova (second round)
31. (Ukraine) Daria Snigur (second round)
32. (Russia) Anna Blinkova (first round)

== Qualifiers ==
1. (United States) Katie Volynets
2. (Italy) Martina Trevisan
3. (United States) Caroline Dolehide
4. (United States) Hailey Baptiste
5. (Bulgaria) Viktoriya Tomova
6. (Ukraine) Lesia Tsurenko
7. (United States) Emina Bektas
8. (Canada) Rebecca Marino
9. (South Korea) Jang Su-jeong
10. (Netherlands) Arianne Hartono
11. (United Kingdom) Harriet Dart
12. (Switzerland) Stefanie Vögele
13. (China) Zheng Qinwen
14. (Spain) Cristina Bucșa
15. (Italy) Lucia Bronzetti
16. (Slovakia) Viktória Kužmová

== Lucky losers ==
1. (Japan) Nao Hibino
2. (Romania) Irina Bara

== Draw ==
=== First qualifier ===
First round
1	(Russia) Anna Kalinskaya	1	4
(Spain) Andrea Lázaro García	6	6
(United States) Katie Volynets	6	6
(United States) Hanna Chang	3	3
(Switzerland) Conny Perrin	3	6	4
(Sweden) Mirjam Björklund	6	4	6
(Switzerland) Susan Bandecchi	4	2
30	(Australia) Arina Rodionova	6	6

Second round
(Spain) Andrea Lázaro García	2	0
(United States) Katie Volynets	6	6
(Sweden) Mirjam Björklund	4	6	6
30	(Australia) Arina Rodionova	6	4	2

Qualifying competition
(United States) Katie Volynets	7	6
(Sweden) Mirjam Björklund	5	2

=== Second qualifier ===
First round
2	(Italy) Martina Trevisan	5	7^{12}	6
(Romania) Irina Fetecău	7	6^{10}	2
(Spain) Irene Burillo Escorihuela	5	2
PR	(Australia) Jaimee Fourlis	7	6
(Chile) Daniela Seguel	4	6	6
(Croatia) Tereza Mrdeža	6	4	3
(Italy) Lucrezia Stefanini	5	6	3
19	(Belarus) Olga Govortsova	7	4	6

Second round
2	(Italy) Martina Trevisan	6	6
PR	(Australia) Jaimee Fourlis	2	0
(Chile) Daniela Seguel	3	6	3
19	(Belarus) Olga Govortsova	6	4	6

Qualifying competition
2	(Italy) Martina Trevisan	6	6
19	(Belarus) Olga Govortsova	2	3

=== Third qualifier ===
First round
3	(China) Zhu Lin	6	6^{5}	3
(France) Tessah Andrianjafitrimo	3	7^{7}	6
(Austria) Julia Grabher	6^{5}	6	5
PR	(Germany) Katharina Hobgarski	7^{7}	2	2^{r}
(Belarus) Yuliya Hatouka	4	2
(United States) Caroline Dolehide	6	6
(China) You Xiaodi	6	6
32	(Russia) Anna Blinkova	2	3

Second round
(France) Tessah Andrianjafitrimo	5	2
(Austria) Julia Grabher	7	6
(United States) Caroline Dolehide	6	6
(China) You Xiaodi	3	2

Qualifying competition
(Austria) Julia Grabher	6^{5}	2
(United States) Caroline Dolehide	7^{7}	6

=== Fourth qualifier ===
First round
4	(Serbia) Nina Stojanović	6	6
(Brazil) Laura Pigossi	1	2
(United States) Hailey Baptiste	6	6^{2}	7^{10}
PR	(United Kingdom) Samantha Murray Sharan	1	7^{7}	6^{8}
(China) Yuan Yue	7	6
(Netherlands) Lesley Pattinama Kerkhove	5	2
WC	(Australia) Catherine Aulia	0	3
21	(United States) Caty McNally	6	6

Second round
4	(Serbia) Nina Stojanović	3	4
(United States) Hailey Baptiste	6	6
(China) Yuan Yue	7^{7}	6
21	(United States) Caty McNally	6^{1}	4

Qualifying competition
(United States) Hailey Baptiste	6^{4}	7^{7}	6
(China) Yuan Yue	7^{7}	6^{5}	3

=== Fifth qualifier ===
First round
5	(Bulgaria) Viktoriya Tomova	6	4	6
(Greece) Despina Papamichail	2	6	1
WC	(Australia) Abbie Myers	2	4
(United Kingdom) Katie Swan	6	6
(Romania) Alexandra Cadanțu-Ignatik	6	6
(Germany) Katharina Gerlach	3	1
(Georgia (country)) Mariam Bolkvadze	1	4
18	(Romania) Irina Bara	6	6

Second round
5	(Bulgaria) Viktoriya Tomova	6	7
(United Kingdom) Katie Swan	0	5
(Romania) Alexandra Cadanțu-Ignatik	7	1	4
18	(Romania) Irina Bara	5	6	6

Qualifying competition
5	(Bulgaria) Viktoriya Tomova	6	6
18	(Romania) Irina Bara	2	1

=== Sixth qualifier ===
First round
6	(Ukraine) Lesia Tsurenko	6	6
(India) Ankita Raina	1	0
(Greece) Valentini Grammatikopoulou	3	2
(United States) Asia Muhammad	6	6
(Russia) Elina Avanesyan	6	6^{5}	6
PR	(Liechtenstein) Kathinka von Deichmann	2	7^{7}	3
(United States) Grace Min	7^{8}	4	1
23	(Ukraine) Kateryna Baindl	6^{6}	6	6

Second round
6	(Ukraine) Lesia Tsurenko	6	7
(United States) Asia Muhammad	3	5
(Russia) Elina Avanesyan	6	7
23	(Ukraine) Kateryna Baindl	2	5

Qualifying competition
6	(Ukraine) Lesia Tsurenko	6	6
(Russia) Elina Avanesyan	4	0

=== Seventh qualifier ===
First round
7	(France) Chloé Paquet	2	6	2
(United States) Francesca Di Lorenzo	6	2	6
(Australia) Ellen Perez	4	0
(United States) Christina McHale	6	6
WC	(Australia) Zoe Hives	7	6
PR	(China) Han Xinyun	5	0
(United States) Emina Bektas	6	6
27	(United Kingdom) Katie Boulter	3	4

Second round
(United States) Francesca Di Lorenzo	4	3
(United States) Christina McHale	6	6
WC	(Australia) Zoe Hives	5	5
(United States) Emina Bektas	7	7

Qualifying competition
(United States) Christina McHale	3	6	6^{7}
(United States) Emina Bektas	6	1	7^{10}

=== Eighth qualifier ===
First round
8	(Russia) Kamilla Rakhimova	6	6
(Romania) Gabriela Lee	2	3
(Andorra) Victoria Jiménez Kasintseva	6	6
(Russia) Anastasia Zakharova	3	1
(Ukraine) Kateryna Bondarenko	5	6	6
WC	(Australia) Charlotte Kempenaers-Pocz	7	3	2
(Switzerland) Ylena In-Albon	3	3
24	(Canada) Rebecca Marino	6	6

Second round
8	(Russia) Kamilla Rakhimova	6^{5}	7^{10}	6
(Andorra) Victoria Jiménez Kasintseva	7^{7}	6^{8}	4
(Ukraine) Kateryna Bondarenko	3	4
24	(Canada) Rebecca Marino	6	6

Qualifying competition
8	(Russia) Kamilla Rakhimova	6	2	6^{7}
24	(Canada) Rebecca Marino	4	6	7^{10}

=== Ninth qualifier ===
First round
9	(Italy) Sara Errani	4	4
(South Korea) Jang Su-jeong	6	6
WC	(Australia) Taylah Preston	7	6
(Japan) Kurumi Nara	5	4
(Spain) Rebeka Masarova	6	6
(Czech Republic) Jesika Malečková	2	2
(Paraguay) Verónica Cepede Royg	3	6	2
31	(Ukraine) Daria Snigur	6	3	6

Second round
(South Korea) Jang Su-jeong	6	6
WC	(Australia) Taylah Preston	0	0
(Spain) Rebeka Masarova	6	6
31	(Ukraine) Daria Snigur	3	1

Qualifying competition
(South Korea) Jang Su-jeong	6	6
(Spain) Rebeka Masarova	2	3

=== Tenth qualifier ===
First round
10	(Romania) Mihaela Buzărnescu	2	2
(Belgium) Ysaline Bonaventure	6	6
(Netherlands) Arianne Hartono	4	6	6
WC	(Australia) Talia Gibson	6	4	1
(Argentina) Paula Ormaechea	1	6	0
(Switzerland) Simona Waltert	6	4	6
(Japan) Yuriko Miyazaki	5	1
17	(Germany) Jule Niemeier	7	6

Second round
(Belgium) Ysaline Bonaventure	2	6	4
(Netherlands) Arianne Hartono	6	4	6
(Switzerland) Simona Waltert	1	1
17	(Germany) Jule Niemeier	6	6

Qualifying competition
(Netherlands) Arianne Hartono	6	1	6
17	(Germany) Jule Niemeier	1	6	3

=== Eleventh qualifier ===
First round
11	(United Kingdom) Harriet Dart	6	6
(Italy) Federica Di Sarra	4	3
(United States) Alycia Parks	6	1	6
(United States) Jamie Loeb	3	6	2
WC	(Australia) Kimberly Birrell	7^{7}	3	6
(Russia) Marina Melnikova	6^{0}	6	1
(Switzerland) Leonie Küng	3	6	3
22	(Georgia (country)) Ekaterine Gorgodze	6	1	6

Second round
11	(United Kingdom) Harriet Dart	3	6	6
(United States) Alycia Parks	6	2	2
WC	(Australia) Kimberly Birrell	6	6
22	(Georgia (country)) Ekaterine Gorgodze	2	1

Qualifying competition
11	(United Kingdom) Harriet Dart	6	6
WC	(Australia) Kimberly Birrell	3	3

=== Twelfth qualifier ===
First round
12	(Hungary) Dalma Gálfi	6	7
(Brazil) Carolina Alves	2	5
(Netherlands) Indy de Vroome	7	1	7
(Poland) Urszula Radwańska	5	6	5
(United States) Whitney Osuigwe	7	6
(France) Jessika Ponchet	5	3
WC	(Australia) Alexandra Bozovic	4	3
25	(Switzerland) Stefanie Vögele	6	6

Second round
12	(Hungary) Dalma Gálfi	4	7^{11}	6^{6}
(Netherlands) Indy de Vroome	6	6^{9}	7^{10}
(United States) Whitney Osuigwe	2	4
25	(Switzerland) Stefanie Vögele	6	6

Qualifying competition
(Netherlands) Indy de Vroome	3	6	5
25	(Switzerland) Stefanie Vögele	6	4	7

=== Thirteenth qualifier ===
First round
13	(China) Zheng Qinwen	1	7^{7}	6
(United States) CoCo Vandeweghe	6	6^{5}	1
(Australia) Seone Mendez	5	6	6
(United Kingdom) Jodie Burrage	7	1	4
(Bosnia and Herzegovina) Dea Herdželaš	7^{7}	1	5
(Chinese Taipei) Liang En-shuo	6^{4}	6	7
(Hungary) Réka Luca Jani	1	5
28	(Japan) Mai Hontama	6	7

Second round
13	(China) Zheng Qinwen	6	6
(Australia) Seone Mendez	3	2
(Chinese Taipei) Liang En-shuo	0	4
28	(Japan) Mai Hontama	6	6

Qualifying competition
13	(China) Zheng Qinwen	6	6^{3}	6
28	(Japan) Mai Hontama	3	7^{7}	3

=== Fourteenth qualifier ===
First round
14	(Serbia) Aleksandra Krunić	3	1
(Slovakia) Rebecca Šramková	6	6
(Spain) Cristina Bucșa	6	6
(Romania) Cristina Dinu	1	0
(United States) Sachia Vickery	3	7^{7}	2
(Australia) Lizette Cabrera	6	6^{5}	6
(Netherlands) Richèl Hogenkamp	7	2	6
20	(Germany) Anna-Lena Friedsam	5	6	4

Second round
(Slovakia) Rebecca Šramková	2	5
(Spain) Cristina Bucșa	6	7
(Australia) Lizette Cabrera	4	5
(Netherlands) Richèl Hogenkamp	6	7

Qualifying competition
(Spain) Cristina Bucșa	7	2	6
(Netherlands) Richèl Hogenkamp	5	6	3

=== Fifteenth qualifier ===
First round
15	(Japan) Nao Hibino	6	7
(Poland) Katarzyna Kawa	1	5
(Italy) Elisabetta Cocciaretto	6	7
(Spain) Lara Arruabarrena	0	5
(Mexico) Ana Sofía Sánchez	0	4
(Russia) Valeria Savinykh	6	6
(France) Amandine Hesse	0	2
26	(Italy) Lucia Bronzetti	6	6

Second round
15	(Japan) Nao Hibino	6	6
(Italy) Elisabetta Cocciaretto	2	1
(Russia) Valeria Savinykh	2	2
26	(Italy) Lucia Bronzetti	6	6

Qualifying competition
15	(Japan) Nao Hibino	6	2	1
26	(Italy) Lucia Bronzetti	4	6	6

=== Sixteenth qualifier ===
First round
16	(Russia) Anastasia Gasanova	2	4
(Slovakia) Viktória Kužmová	6	6
(Croatia) Jana Fett	3	6	7
WC	(Australia) Destanee Aiava	6	3	5
(Japan) Yuki Naito	7^{7}	3	3
(Spain) Aliona Bolsova	6^{2}	6	6
(United States) Usue Maitane Arconada	5
29	(United Kingdom) Francesca Jones	1^{r}

Second round
(Slovakia) Viktória Kužmová	6	6
(Croatia) Jana Fett	4	3
(Spain) Aliona Bolsova	6	4	6
(United States) Usue Maitane Arconada	4	6	4

Qualifying competition
(Slovakia) Viktória Kužmová	6	7
(Spain) Aliona Bolsova	2	5
