= 2022 Australian Open – Girls' singles =

Girls' singles
- 2022 Australian Open

Final
- Champion: (Croatia) Petra Marčinko
- Runner-up: (Belgium) Sofia Costoulas
- Score: 7–5, 6–1

Events
| Singles | men | women | | boys | girls |
| Doubles | men | women | mixed | boys | girls |
| WC Singles | men | women | quad |
| WC Doubles | men | women | quad |
- Australian Open

Petra Marčinko defeated Sofia Costoulas in the final, 7–5, 6–1 to win the girls' singles title at the 2022 Australian Open.

Victoria Jiménez Kasintseva was the defending champion but chose not to participate, instead competing in the women's singles qualifying event, where she lost in the second round to Kamilla Rakhimova.

Angella Okutoyi and Meshkatolzahra Safi became the first girls of their countries to win a junior Grand Slam match, representing Kenya and Iran, respectively.

== Seeds ==
1. (Croatia) Petra Marčinko (champion)
2. (Russia) Diana Shnaider (quarterfinals)
3. (Russia) Ksenia Zaytseva (third round, retired)
4. (Argentina) Solana Sierra (first round)
5. (United States) Clervie Ngounoue (second round)
6. (Greece) Michaela Laki (quarterfinals)
7. (Denmark) Johanne Svendsen (first round)
8. (Belgium) Sofia Costoulas (final)

9. (Switzerland) Céline Naef (third round)
10. (Russia) Yaroslava Bartashevich (second round)
11. (Croatia) Lucija Ćirić Bagarić (first round)
12. (Belgium) Hanne Vandewinkel (first round)
13. (United States) Liv Hovde (semifinals)
14. (Canada) Victoria Mboko (second round)
15. (Finland) Laura Hietaranta (first round)
16. (Russia) Elena Pridankina (first round)

Click on the seed number of a player to go to their draw section.

== Draw ==
Key

- Q = Qualifier
- WC = Wild card
- LL = Lucky loser
- Alt = Alternate
- ITF = ITF entry
- PR = Protected ranking
- SR = Special ranking
- SE = Special exempt
- JE = Junior exempt
- JR = Junior Accelerator Programme entrant
- CO = College Accelerator Programme entrant
- NG = Next Gen Accelerator Program entrant
- w/o = Walkover
- r = Retired
- d = Defaulted

=== Finals ===
Quarterfinals
1 | (Croatia) Petra Marčinko | 7 | 6
(Serbia) Lola Radivojević | 5 | 2
13 | (United States) Liv Hovde | 6 | 6
6 | (Greece) Michaela Laki | 4 | 0
(Germany) Carolina Kuhl | 1 | 2
(Australia) Charlotte Kempenaers-Pocz | 6 | 6
8 | (Belgium) Sofia Costoulas | 6 | 5 | 6
2 | (Russia) Diana Shnaider | 3 | 7 | 4

Semifinals
1 | (Croatia) Petra Marčinko | 6 | 4 | 6
13 | (United States) Liv Hovde | 4 | 6 | 4
(Australia) Charlotte Kempenaers-Pocz | 4 | 1
8 | (Belgium) Sofia Costoulas | 6 | 6

Final
1 | (Croatia) Petra Marčinko | 7 | 6
8 | (Belgium) Sofia Costoulas | 5 | 1

=== Top half ===
==== Section 1 ====
First round
1 | (Croatia) Petra Marčinko | 3 | 6 | 6
(United States) Alexis Blokhina | 6 | 3 | 3
(Canada) Kayla Cross | 6 | 6
(Russia) Anastasiia Gureva | 3 | 4
(Czech Republic) Amélie Šmejkalová | 6 | 3 | 6
WC | (Australia) Catherine Aulia | 4 | 6 | 0
(Bulgaria) Denislava Glushkova | 6 | 6
15 | (Finland) Laura Hietaranta | 3 | 4
10 | (Russia) Yaroslava Bartashevich | 7 | 6
Q | (Japan) Hayu Kinoshita | 5 | 4
(Serbia) Lola Radivojević | 4 | 6 | 6
WC | (Australia) Yilin Yan | 6 | 3 | 4
Q | (Italy) Federica Urgesi | 4 | 7^{7} | 3
(Kenya) Angella Okutoyi | 6 | 6^{5} | 6
Q | (Australia) Zara Larke | 6 | 6
7 | (Denmark) Johanne Svendsen | 4 | 1

Second round
1 | (Croatia) P Marčinko | 6 | 6
(Canada) K Cross | 2 | 2
(Czech Republic) A Šmejkalová | 3 | 2
(Bulgaria) D Glushkova | 6 | 6
10 | (Russia) Y Bartashevich | 4 | 4
(Serbia) L Radivojević | 6 | 6
(Kenya) A Okutoyi | 7^{7} | 5 | 6
Q | (Australia) Z Larke | 6^{0} | 7 | 1

Third round
1 | (Croatia) P Marčinko | 6 | 6
(Bulgaria) D Glushkova | 3 | 1
(Serbia) L Radivojević | 6 | 6
(Kenya) A Okutoyi | 2 | 3

Quarterfinals
1 | (Croatia) P Marčinko | 7 | 6
(Serbia) L Radivojević | 5 | 2

==== Section 2 ====
First round
3 | (Russia) Ksenia Zaytseva | 6 | 6
Q | (Chinese Taipei) Li Yu-yun | 2 | 1
(Romania) Anca Todoni | 6 | 6
WC | (Australia) Roisin Gilheany | 1 | 4
(Italy) Georgia Pedone | 6 | 6
Q | (Japan) Mio Mushika | 2 | 3
WC | (Australia) Talia Gibson | 3 | 6^{8}
13 | (United States) Liv Hovde | 6 | 7^{10}
12 | (Belgium) Hanne Vandewinkel | 4 | 6 | 2
(Canada) Mia Kupres | 6 | 4 | 6
WC | (Australia) Lily Taylor | 2 | 4
(Czech Republic) Dominika Šalková | 6 | 6
(Morocco) Aya El Aouni | 2 | 1
(United Kingdom) Ranah Stoiber | 6 | 6
(Switzerland) Chelsea Fontenel | 6^{3} | 0
6 | (Greece) Michaela Laki | 7^{7} | 6

Second round
3 | (Russia) K Zaytseva | 7^{7} | 6
(Romania) A Todoni | 6^{2} | 2
(Italy) G Pedone | 0 | 1
13 | (United States) L Hovde | 6 | 6
(Canada) M Kupres | 4 | 6 | 2
(Czech Republic) D Šalková | 6 | 4 | 6
(United Kingdom) RA Stoiber | 6 | 4 | 4
6 | (Greece) M Laki | 4 | 6 | 6

Third round
3 | (Russia) K Zaytseva | 3 | 0^{r}
13 | (United States) L Hovde | 6 | 3
(Czech Republic) D Šalková | 3 | 7^{7} | 6^{8}
6 | (Greece) M Laki | 6 | 6^{5} | 7^{10}

Quarterfinals
13 | (United States) L Hovde | 6 | 6
6 | (Greece) M Laki | 4 | 0

=== Bottom half ===
==== Section 3 ====
First round
5 | (United States) Clervie Ngounoue | 6 | 6
(France) Nahia Berecoechea | 3 | 4
(Italy) Virginia Ferrara | 3 | 3
(Russia) Ekaterina Khayrutdinova | 6 | 6
(Canada) Annabelle Xu | 6 | 6
WC | (Australia) Lily Fairclough | 4 | 2
(Germany) Carolina Kuhl | 6 | 6
11 | (Croatia) Lucija Ćirić Bagarić | 1 | 4
16 | (Russia) Elena Pridankina | 7 | 2 | 2
(Australia) Charlotte Kempenaers-Pocz | 5 | 6 | 6
(Turkey) Ayşegül Mert | 5 | 5
WC | (Japan) Sara Saito | 7 | 7
(Czech Republic) Tereza Valentová | 6 | 6
(Brazil) Ana Candiotto | 3 | 2
(Slovakia) Irina Balus | 6 | 6
4 | (Argentina) Solana Sierra | 2 | 4

Second round
5 | (United States) C Ngounoue | 4 | 2
(Russia) E Khayrutdinova | 6 | 6
(Canada) A Xu | 6 | 3 | 4
(Germany) C Kuhl | 4 | 6 | 6
(Australia) C Kempenaers-Pocz | 6 | 6
WC | (Japan) S Saito | 2 | 3
(Czech Republic) T Valentová | 6 | 6
(Slovakia) I Balus | 4 | 1

Third round
(Russia) E Khayrutdinova | 6^{2} | 5
(Germany) C Kuhl | 7^{7} | 7
(Australia) C Kempenaers-Pocz | 7^{7} | 0 | 7^{10}
(Czech Republic) T Valentová | 6^{3} | 6 | 6^{5}

Quarterfinals
(Germany) C Kuhl | 1 | 2
(Australia) C Kempenaers-Pocz | 6 | 6

==== Section 4 ====
First round
8 | (Belgium) Sofia Costoulas | 6 | 6
(Kazakhstan) Aruzhan Sagandikova | 1 | 2
Q | (Australia) Anja Nayar | 4 | 3
(Iran) Meshkatolzahra Safi | 6 | 6
(Serbia) Tijana Sretenović | 6 | 7^{8}
(Greece) Dimitra Pavlou | 0 | 6^{6}
(Japan) Mao Mushika | 4 | 3
9 | (Switzerland) Céline Naef | 6 | 6
14 | (Canada) Victoria Mboko | 6 | 6
Q | (Australia) Elena Micic | 4 | 2
(United States) Qavia Lopez | 4 | 6 | 6
(Czech Republic) Lucie Havlíčková | 6 | 2 | 1
(Lithuania) Patricija Paukštytė | 2 | 1
WC | (Australia) Taylah Preston | 6 | 6
Q | (Italy) Denise Valente | 5 | 3
2 | (Russia) Diana Shnaider | 7 | 6

Second round
8 | (Belgium) S Costoulas | 6 | 6
(Iran) M Safi | 0 | 2
(Serbia) T Sretenović | 1 | 2
9 | (Switzerland) C Naef | 6 | 6
14 | (Canada) V Mboko | 1 | 7 | 4
(United States) Q Lopez | 6 | 5 | 6
WC | (Australia) T Preston | 6^{2} | 4
2 | (Russia) D Shnaider | 7^{7} | 6

Third round
8 | (Belgium) S Costoulas | 7^{7} | 7^{7}
9 | (Switzerland) C Naef | 6^{3} | 6^{5}
(United States) Q Lopez | 2 | 2
2 | (Russia) D Shnaider | 6 | 6

Quarterfinals
8 | (Belgium) S Costoulas | 6 | 5 | 6
2 | (Russia) D Shnaider | 3 | 7 | 4

== Qualifying ==
=== Seeds ===
1. (Poland) Malwina Rowińska (qualifying competition)
2. (Japan) Hayu Kinoshita (qualified)
3. (Italy) Denise Valente (qualified)
4. (Chinese Taipei) Li Yu-yun (qualified)
5. (Italy) Federica Urgesi (qualified)
6. (Japan) Mio Mushika (qualified)
7. (Australia) Zara Larke (qualified)
8. (Australia) Anja Nayar (qualified)
9. (Australia) Tianyu Dong (first round)
10. (Australia) Stefani Webb (qualifying competition)
11. (Australia) Darina Kamenoff (first round)
12. (Australia) Sarah Rokusek (first round)
13. (Australia) Elena Micic (qualified)
14. (Australia) Mia Tsoukalas (first round)
15. (Australia) Jelena Cvijanovic (qualifying competition)
16. (Australia) Emerson Jones (qualifying competition)

=== Qualifiers ===
1. (Australia) Elena Micic
2. (Japan) Hayu Kinoshita
3. (Italy) Denise Valente
4. (Chinese Taipei) Li Yu-yun
5. (Italy) Federica Urgesi
6. (Japan) Mio Mushika
7. (Australia) Zara Larke
8. (Australia) Anja Nayar

=== Draw ===
==== First qualifier ====
First round
1 | (Poland) Malwina Rowińska | 6 | 6
WC | (Australia) Elyana Moonen | 1 | 2
(Australia) Piper Freeman | 3 | 1
13 | (Australia) Elena Micic | 6 | 6

Qualifying competition
1 | (Poland) Malwina Rowińska | 6 | 2 | 4
13 | (Australia) Elena Micic | 4 | 6 | 6

==== Second qualifier ====
First round
2 | (Japan) Hayu Kinoshita | 6 | 6
(Australia) Sienna Leeson | 0 | 0
(Australia) Leann Serna | 6^{6} | 6 | 6
14 | (Australia) Mia Tsoukalas | 7^{8} | 4 | 2

Qualifying competition
2 | (Japan) Hayu Kinoshita | 6 | 6
(Australia) Leann Serna | 2 | 1

==== Third qualifier ====
First round
3 | (Italy) Denise Valente | 6 | 6
WC | (Australia) Eliza Dunbar | 2 | 3
(Australia) Leanne Abouhamad | 6 | 6
9/WC | (Australia) Tianyu Dong | 4 | 4

Qualifying competition
3 | (Italy) Denise Valente | 6 | 6
(Australia) Leanne Abouhamad | 2 | 4

==== Fourth qualifier ====
First round
4 | (Chinese Taipei) Li Yu-yun | 4 | 6 | [10]
(Australia) Elicia Kim | 6 | 4 | [3]
WC | (Australia) Indiya McLeod | 1 | 6 | 6
12 | (Australia) Sarah Rokusek | 6 | 4 | 3

Qualifying competition
4 | (Chinese Taipei) Li Yu-yun | 6 | 6
(Australia) Indiya McLeod | 3 | 2

==== Fifth qualifier ====
First round
5 | (Italy) Federica Urgesi | 6 | 6
(Australia) Chloe Schwarz | 0 | 2
(Australia) Audrey Aulia | 3 | 0
10 | (Australia) Stefani Webb | 6 | 6

Qualifying competition
5 | (Italy) Federica Urgesi | 6 | 6
10 | (Australia) Stefani Webb | 3 | 2

==== Sixth qualifier ====
First round
6 | (Japan) Mio Mushika | 6 | 4 | 6
(Australia) Zali Morris | 2 | 6 | 0
WC | (Australia) Isabella Crossman | 6 | 6
11 | (Australia) Darina Kamenoff | 2 | 3

Qualifying competition
6 | (Japan) Mio Mushika | 6 | 6
WC | (Australia) Isabella Crossman | 4 | 1

==== Seventh qualifier ====
First round
7 | (Australia) Zara Larke | 6 | 6
(Australia) Lara Charles | 3 | 1
(Australia) Lucy Quinlan | 5 | 1
15 | (Australia) Jelena Cvijanovic | 7 | 6

Qualifying competition
7 | (Australia) Zara Larke | 6 | 6
15 | (Australia) Jelena Cvijanovic | 3 | 4

==== Eighth qualifier ====
First round
8 | (Australia) Anja Nayar | 6 | 7^{9}
(Australia) Madison Schwarz | 0 | 6^{7}
(Australia) Cara Korhonen | 0 | 1
16/WC | (Australia) Emerson Jones | 6 | 6

Qualifying competition
8 | (Australia) Anja Nayar | 6 | 6
16/WC | (Australia) Emerson Jones | 4 | 3
