= Meshkatolzahra Safi =

Iranian tennis player

- Country (sports): Iran
- Born: 5 August 2004 (age 22)
- Plays: Right (two-handed backhand)
- Prize money: $7,285

Singles
- Career record: 38–36
- Highest ranking: No. 1360 (9 June 2025)
- Current ranking: No. 1421 (22 December 2025)

Grand Slam singles results
- Australian Open Junior: 2R (2022)
- French Open Junior: Q1 (2022)

Doubles
- Career record: 22–22
- Career titles: 1 ITF
- Highest ranking: No. 808 (16 June 2025)
- Current ranking: No. 860 (22 December 2025)

Grand Slam doubles results
- Australian Open Junior: 1R (2022)

Team competitions
- Fed Cup: 3–8
- Last updated on: 22 December 2025.

Meshkatolzahra Safi (Persian: مشکات‌الزهرا صفی, born 5 August 2004) is an Iranian tennis player who became the first Iranian woman to win a match in a Grand Slam, competed at 2022 Australian Open – Girls' singles, 2022 Australian Open – Girls' doubles and 2022 French Open – Girls' singles.

She also missed out playing at Wimbledon 2022 after failing to grand a visa in time.

Safi also became the first Iranian under-100 ITF junior ranked female player in the history, holds a career high ITF Junior Ranking of 69 achieved on 21 March 2022.

== International career ==
Spanish tennis legend Rafael Nadal said that he is very proud to have inspired Meshkatolzahra Safi's Australian Open journey, while Safi had a chance to meet him during the Australian Open 2022.

== ITF Circuit finals ==
=== Doubles: 6 (1 title, 5 runner-ups) ===
Legend W15 tournaments (1–5)	Finals by surface Hard (1–1) Clay (0–2) Carpet (0–2)

Result	W–L	Date	Tournament	Tier	Surface	Partner	Opponents	Score
Loss	0–1	May 2025	ITF Kayseri, Turkey	W15	Hard	(Colombia) Valentina Mediorreal	(Turkey) Duru Söke (Turkey) Doğa Türkmen	2–6, 6–7^{(4)}
Win	1–1	June 2025	ITF Kayseri, Turkey	W15	Hard	(United Kingdom) Jasmine Conway	(United States) Jamilah Snells (Turkey) Duru Söke	2–6, 6–4, [10–3]
Loss	1–2	Oct 2025	ITF Solarino, Italy	W15	Carpet	(Germany) Vivien Sandberg	(Italy) Carolina Gasparini; Kseniia Ruchkina	3–6, 4–6
Loss	1–3	Nov 2025	ITF Solarino, Italy	W15	Carpet	(Germany) Vivien Sandberg	(Germany) Victoria Pohle (Germany) Julia Stusek	5–7, 2–6
Loss	1–4	Dec 2025	ITF Antalya, Turkey	W15	Clay	(China) Xu Jiayu	(Morocco) Diae El Jardi (Romania) Maria Sara Popa	4–6, 6–3, [11–13]
Loss	1–5	May 2026	ITF Tsaghkadzor, Armenia	W15	Clay	(Italy) Ginevra Parentini Vallega Montebruno	(Kazakhstan) Aruzhan Sagandykova (Uzbekistan) Sevil Yuldasheva	5–7, 2–6
