= 2022 French Open – Women's singles =

Tennis championship

Women's singles
- 2022 French Open

Final
- Champion: (Poland) Iga Świątek
- Runner-up: (United States) Coco Gauff
- Score: 6–1, 6–3

Details
- Draw: 128 (16 Q / 8 WC)
- Seeds: 32

Events
Singles	men	women		boys	girls
Doubles	men	women	mixed	boys	girls
WC Singles	men	women	quad
WC Doubles	men	women	quad
Legends	men	women

Qualification
Singles	men	women
- French Open

Iga Świątek defeated Coco Gauff in the final, 6–1, 6–3 to win the women's singles tennis title at the 2022 French Open. It was her second French Open title and second major title overall. With the win, Świątek extended her winning streak to 35 matches (dating to the Qatar Open in February). Świątek was the youngest winner of multiple majors since Maria Sharapova in 2006.

Barbora Krejčíková was the defending champion, but lost in the first round to Diane Parry. This marked only the third time in French Open history that the defending champion lost in the first round (after Anastasia Myskina in 2005 and Jeļena Ostapenko in 2018), and the record 15th consecutive unsuccessful French Open women's singles title defense since 2007.

This was the first edition of the French Open since 2004 to feature three Americans in the quarterfinals: Gauff, Jessica Pegula, and Sloane Stephens. Gauff was the youngest major finalist since Sharapova at the 2004 Wimbledon Championships, and the youngest French Open finalist since Kim Clijsters in 2001. 17-year-old Linda Nosková was the youngest qualifier to debut in the main draw since Michelle Larcher de Brito in 2009; this was also the future Wimbledon champion's first major appearance. This marked only the second time in the Open Era when just one of the top ten seeds reached the fourth round of a major, after the 2018 Wimbledon Championships.

This marked the final French Open appearances of 2016 and 2018 champions and former world No. 1s Garbiñe Muguruza and Simona Halep, respectively. Muguruza lost to Kaia Kanepi in the first round, while Halep lost to Zheng Qinwen in the second round.

This was the first edition of the tournament to feature a final-set tiebreak. When the score in a final set reached 6–6, the first player to reach 10 points and lead by at least two points won the set (and the match). The first women's singles main-draw match to feature the ten-point tie break was the first-round match between Irina-Camelia Begu and Jasmine Paolini, with Begu emerging victorious.

== Seeds ==
1. (Poland) Iga Świątek (champion)
2. (Czech Republic) Barbora Krejčíková (first round)
3. (Spain) Paula Badosa (third round, retired)
4. (Greece) Maria Sakkari (second round)
5. (Estonia) Anett Kontaveit (first round)
6. (Tunisia) Ons Jabeur (first round)
7. Aryna Sabalenka (third round)
8. (Czech Republic) Karolína Plíšková (second round)
9. (United States) Danielle Collins (second round)
10. (Spain) Garbiñe Muguruza (first round)
11. (United States) Jessica Pegula (quarterfinals)
12. (United Kingdom) Emma Raducanu (second round)
13. (Latvia) Jeļena Ostapenko (second round)
14. (Switzerland) Belinda Bencic (third round)
15. Victoria Azarenka (third round)
16. (Kazakhstan) Elena Rybakina (third round)

17. (Canada) Leylah Fernandez (quarterfinals)
18. (United States) Coco Gauff (final)
19. (Romania) Simona Halep (second round)
20. Daria Kasatkina (semifinals)
21. (Germany) Angelique Kerber (third round)
22. (United States) Madison Keys (fourth round)
23. (Switzerland) Jil Teichmann (fourth round)
24. (Slovenia) Tamara Zidanšek (third round)
25. Liudmila Samsonova (first round)
26. (Romania) Sorana Cîrstea (second round)
27. (United States) Amanda Anisimova (fourth round)
28. (Italy) Camila Giorgi (fourth round)
29. Veronika Kudermetova (quarterfinals)
30. Ekaterina Alexandrova (second round)
31. (Belgium) Elise Mertens (fourth round)
32. (Czech Republic) Petra Kvitová (second round)

Click on the seed number of a player to go to their draw section.

== Draw ==
Key

- Q = Qualifier
- WC = Wild card
- LL = Lucky loser
- Alt = Alternate
- ITF = ITF entry
- PR = Protected ranking
- SR = Special ranking
- SE = Special exempt
- JE = Junior exempt
- JR = Junior Accelerator Programme entrant
- CO = College Accelerator Programme entrant
- NG = Next Gen Accelerator Program entrant
- w/o = Walkover
- r = Retired
- d = Defaulted

=== Finals ===
Quarterfinals
1	(Poland) Iga Świątek	6	6
11	(United States) Jessica Pegula	3	2
29	Veronika Kudermetova	4	6^{5}
20	Daria Kasatkina	6	7^{7}
(Italy) Martina Trevisan	6	6^{3}	6
17	(Canada) Leylah Fernandez	2	7^{7}	3
18	(United States) Coco Gauff	7	6
(United States) Sloane Stephens	5	2

Semifinals
1	(Poland) Iga Świątek	6	6
20	Daria Kasatkina	2	1
(Italy) Martina Trevisan	3	1
18	(United States) Coco Gauff	6	6

Final
1	(Poland) Iga Świątek	6	6
18	(United States) Coco Gauff	1	3

=== Top half ===
==== Section 1 ====
First round
1	(Poland) I Świątek	6	6
Q	(Ukraine) L Tsurenko	2	0
(United States) A Riske	6	6
(Ukraine) D Yastremska	3	3
(Slovakia) AK Schmiedlová	4	7^{7}	6
(Slovakia) K Kučová	6	6^{1}	2
(Montenegro) D Kovinić	2	6	6
25	L Samsonova	6	2	1
19	(Romania) S Halep	6	1	6
LL	(Germany) N Schunk	4	6	1
(Belgium) M Zanevska	3	1
(China) Q Zheng	6	6
(France) A Cornet	6	6
(Japan) M Doi	2	0
(Italy) L Bronzetti	1	4
13	(Latvia) J Ostapenko	6	6

Second round
1	(Poland) I Świątek	6	6
(United States) A Riske	0	2
(Slovakia) AK Schmiedlová	3	5
(Montenegro) D Kovinić	6	7
19	(Romania) S Halep	6	2	1
(China) Q Zheng	2	6	6
(France) A Cornet	6	1	6
13	(Latvia) J Ostapenko	0	6	3

Third round
1	(Poland) I Świątek	6	7
(Montenegro) D Kovinić	3	5
(China) Q Zheng	6	3
(France) A Cornet	0	0^{r}

Fourth round
1	(Poland) I Świątek	6^{5}	6	6
(China) Q Zheng	7^{7}	0	2

==== Section 2 ====
First round
11	(United States) J Pegula	6	6
(China) Q Wang	2	4
(Ukraine) A Kalinina	5
Q	(United States) H Baptiste	2^{r}
(Egypt) M Sherif	6	7
(Ukraine) M Kostyuk	3	5
(United States) C Liu	2	2
24	(Slovenia) T Zidanšek	6	6
30	E Alexandrova	7	6
(Belgium) G Minnen	5	3
(Romania) I-C Begu	4	6	7^{10}
(Italy) J Paolini	6	1	6^{5}
WC	(France) L Jeanjean	6	6
(Spain) N Párrizas Díaz	4	3
WC	(France) T Andrianjafitrimo	6	3	1
8	(Czech Republic) Ka Plíšková	2	6	6

Second round
11	(United States) J Pegula	6	5	6
(Ukraine) A Kalinina	1	7	4
(Egypt) M Sherif
24	(Slovenia) T Zidanšek	w/o
30	E Alexandrova	7^{7}	3	4
(Romania) I-C Begu	6^{3}	6	6
WC	(France) L Jeanjean	6	6
8	(Czech Republic) Ka Plíšková	2	2

Third round
11	(United States) J Pegula	6	7^{7}
24	(Slovenia) T Zidanšek	1	6^{2}
(Romania) I-C Begu	6	6
WC	(France) L Jeanjean	1	4

Fourth round
11	(United States) J Pegula	4	6	6
(Romania) I-C Begu	6	2	3

==== Section 3 ====
First round
3	(Spain) P Badosa	6	6
WC	(France) F Ferro	2	0
Q	O Selekhmeteva	5	6^{4}
(Slovenia) K Juvan	7	7^{7}
Q	(Serbia) A Krunić	6	6
K Rakhimova	4	3
Q	(China) L Zhu	4	6	3
29	V Kudermetova	6	3	6
22	(United States) M Keys	6	3	6
A Kalinskaya	3	6	4
PR	(United States) T Townsend	3	4
(France) C Garcia	6	6
WC	(United States) K Volynets	6	2	6
(Switzerland) V Golubic	2	6	1
(Netherlands) A Rus	1	7	2
16	(Kazakhstan) E Rybakina	6	5	6

Second round
3	(Spain) P Badosa	7	3	6
(Slovenia) K Juvan	5	6	2
Q	(Serbia) A Krunić	3	3
29	V Kudermetova	6	6
22	(United States) M Keys	6	7^{7}
(France) C Garcia	4	6^{3}
WC	(United States) K Volynets	4	0
16	(Kazakhstan) E Rybakina	6	6

Third round
3	(Spain) P Badosa	3	1^{r}
29	V Kudermetova	6	2
22	(United States) M Keys	3	6	7^{10}
16	(Kazakhstan) E Rybakina	6	1	6^{3}

Fourth round
29	V Kudermetova	1	6	6
22	(United States) M Keys	6	3	1

==== Section 4 ====
First round
9	(United States) D Collins	6	6
LL	(Bulgaria) V Tomova	0	4
(United States) S Rogers	6	6
(Czech Republic) T Martincová	4	3
(Hungary) P Udvardy	6^{8}	3
Q	(Mexico) F Contreras Gómez	7^{10}	6
LL	(Slovakia) R Šramková	2	0
20	D Kasatkina	6	6
28	(Italy) C Giorgi	3	6	6
(China) S Zhang	6	2	2
Q	(Romania) I Bara	3	1
(Kazakhstan) Y Putintseva	6	6
(United States) M Brengle	6	6
LL	(Romania) M Buzărnescu	1	2
(France) C Paquet	6	3	4
7	A Sabalenka	2	6	6

Second round
9	(United States) D Collins	4	3
(United States) S Rogers	6	6
Q	(Mexico) F Contreras Gómez	0	3
20	D Kasatkina	6	6
28	(Italy) C Giorgi	6	7
(Kazakhstan) Y Putintseva	3	5
(United States) M Brengle	1	3
7	A Sabalenka	6	6

Third round
(United States) S Rogers	3	2
20	D Kasatkina	6	6
28	(Italy) C Giorgi	4	6	6
7	A Sabalenka	6	1	0

Fourth round
20	D Kasatkina	6	6
28	(Italy) C Giorgi	2	2

=== Bottom half ===
==== Section 5 ====
First round
6	(Tunisia) O Jabeur	6	6^{4}	5
(Poland) M Linette	3	7^{7}	7
(Italy) M Trevisan	6	6
(United Kingdom) H Dart	0	2
Q	(Greece) V Grammatikopoulou	1	2
WC	(Australia) D Saville	6	6
(Hungary) A Bondár	6^{0}	1
32	(Czech Republic) P Kvitová	7^{7}	6
21	(Germany) A Kerber	2	6	7
(Poland) M Fręch	6	3	5
(United Kingdom) H Watson	3	3
WC	(France) E Jacquemot	6	6
A Sasnovich	6	6
(China) Xin Wang	4	1
Q	(Czech Republic) L Nosková	7^{7}	5	1
12	(United Kingdom) E Raducanu	6^{4}	7	6

Second round
(Poland) M Linette	3	2
(Italy) M Trevisan	6	6
WC	(Australia) D Saville	6	6
32	(Czech Republic) P Kvitová	4	2
21	(Germany) A Kerber	6	7^{7}
WC	(France) E Jacquemot	1	6^{2}
A Sasnovich	3	6	6
12	(United Kingdom) E Raducanu	6	1	1

Third round
(Italy) M Trevisan	6	6
WC	(Australia) D Saville	3	4
21	(Germany) A Kerber	4	6^{5}
A Sasnovich	6	7^{7}

Fourth round
(Italy) M Trevisan	7^{12}	7
A Sasnovich	6^{10}	5

==== Section 6 ====
First round
14	(Switzerland) B Bencic	6	6
LL	(Hungary) RL Jani	1	1
PR	(Canada) B Andreescu	3	7	6
Q	(Belgium) Y Bonaventure	6	5	0
(Czech Republic) K Siniaková	6	7^{8}
(Croatia) P Martić	4	6^{6}
(France) K Mladenovic	0	5
17	(Canada) L Fernandez	6	7
27	(United States) A Anisimova	7	6
(Japan) N Osaka	5	4
Q	(Sweden) M Björklund	6^{6}	2
Q	(Croatia) D Vekić	7^{8}	6
WC	(France) C Monnet	3	3
(Czech Republic) K Muchová	6	6
(France) C Burel	2	3
4	(Greece) M Sakkari	6	6

Second round
14	(Switzerland) B Bencic	6	6
PR	(Canada) B Andreescu	2	4
(Czech Republic) K Siniaková	3	2
17	(Canada) L Fernandez	6	6
27	(United States) A Anisimova	6	6
Q	(Croatia) D Vekić	4	1
(Czech Republic) K Muchová	7^{7}	7^{7}
4	(Greece) M Sakkari	6^{5}	6^{4}

Third round
14	(Switzerland) B Bencic	5	6	5
17	(Canada) L Fernandez	7	3	7
27	(United States) A Anisimova	6^{7}	6	3
(Czech Republic) K Muchová	7^{9}	2	0^{r}

Fourth round
17	(Canada) L Fernandez	6	4	6
27	(United States) A Anisimova	3	6	3

==== Section 7 ====
First round
5	(Estonia) A Kontaveit	6^{5}	5
(Australia) A Tomljanović	7^{7}	7
(Australia) A Sharma	6	4	5
V Gracheva	4	6	7
LL	A Gasanova	2	1
(Czech Republic) M Bouzková	6	6
(Romania) E-G Ruse	3	1
31	(Belgium) E Mertens	6	6
18	(United States) C Gauff	7	6
Q	(Canada) R Marino	5	0
(Belgium) A Van Uytvanck	3	2
(United States) A Li	6	3^{r}
(Brazil) B Haddad Maia	6	1	6
Q	(Spain) C Bucșa	3	6	2
(Estonia) K Kanepi	2	6	6
10	(Spain) G Muguruza	6	3	4

Second round
(Australia) A Tomljanović	4	7^{7}	5
V Gracheva	6	6^{5}	7
(Czech Republic) M Bouzková
31	(Belgium) E Mertens	w/o
18	(United States) C Gauff	6	7^{7}
(Belgium) A Van Uytvanck	1	6^{4}
(Brazil) B Haddad Maia	4	4
(Estonia) K Kanepi	6	6

Third round
V Gracheva	2	3
31	(Belgium) E Mertens	6	6
18	(United States) C Gauff	6	6
(Estonia) K Kanepi	3	4

Fourth round
31	(Belgium) E Mertens	4	0
18	(United States) C Gauff	6	6

==== Section 8 ====
First round
15	V Azarenka	6^{7}	7^{7}	6
(Romania) A Bogdan	7^{9}	6^{1}	2
(France) O Dodin	4	2
(Germany) A Petkovic	6	6
Q	(Serbia) O Danilović	3	7^{7}	6
(Hungary) D Gálfi	6	6^{4}	2
(United States) B Pera	2	1
23	(Switzerland) J Teichmann	6	6
26	(Romania) S Cîrstea	6	6
PR	(Germany) T Maria	3	3
(United States) S Stephens	5	6	6
Q	(Germany) J Niemeier	7	4	2
(Colombia) C Osorio	6	6
WC	(France) H Tan	4	3
(France) D Parry	1	6	6
2	(Czech Republic) B Krejčíková	6	2	3

Second round
15	V Azarenka	6	7^{7}
(Germany) A Petkovic	1	6^{3}
Q	(Serbia) O Danilović	4	1
23	(Switzerland) J Teichmann	6	6
26	(Romania) S Cîrstea	6	2	0
(United States) S Stephens	3	6	6
(Colombia) C Osorio	3	3
(France) D Parry	6	6

Third round
15	V Azarenka	6	5	6^{5}
23	(Switzerland) J Teichmann	4	7	7^{10}
(United States) S Stephens	6	6
(France) D Parry	2	3

Fourth round
23	(Switzerland) J Teichmann	2	0
(United States) S Stephens	6	6

== Championship match statistics ==
Category	(Poland) Świątek	(United States) Gauff
1st serve %	32/44 (73%)	37/57 (65%)
1st serve points won	23 of 32 = 72%	17 of 37 = 46%
2nd serve points won	7 of 12 = 58%	8 of 20 = 40%
Total service points won	30 of 44 = 68.18%	25 of 57 = 43.86%
Aces	1	2
Double faults	0	3
Winners	18	14
Unforced errors	16	23
Net points won	4 of 9 = 44%	2 of 2 = 100%
Break points converted	5 of 10 = 50%	1 of 1 = 100%
Return points won	32 of 57 = 56%	14 of 44 = 32%
Total points won	62	39

== Seeded players ==
The following are the seeded players. Seedings are based on WTA rankings as of 16 May 2022. Rankings and points before are as of 23 May 2022.

Unlike in the men's tournament, points from the 2021 women's tournament will be dropped at the end of this year's tournament, even though the 2021 tournament was held one week later than in 2022. Players will also be dropping points from the Strasbourg tournament held during the week of 24 May 2021.

Seed	Rank	Player	Points before	Points defending	Points won	Points after	Status
1	1	(Poland) Iga Świątek	7,061	430	2,000	8,631	Champion, defeated (United States) Coco Gauff [18]
2	2	(Czech Republic) Barbora Krejčíková	4,911	2,000+280	10+1	2,642	First round lost to (France) Diane Parry
3	4	(Spain) Paula Badosa	4,545	430	130	4,245	Third round retired against (Russia) Veronika Kudermetova [29]
4	3	(Greece) Maria Sakkari	4,726	780	70	4,016	Second round lost to (Czech Republic) Karolína Muchová
5	5	(Estonia) Anett Kontaveit	4,446	130	10	4,326	First round lost to (Australia) Ajla Tomljanović
6	6	(Tunisia) Ons Jabeur	4,380	240	10	4,150	First round lost to (Poland) Magda Linette
7	7	Aryna Sabalenka	3,966	130	130	3,966	Third round lost to (Italy) Camila Giorgi [28]
8	8	(Czech Republic) Karolína Plíšková	3,678	70	70	3,678	Second round lost to (France) Léolia Jeanjean [WC]
9	9	(United States) Danielle Collins	3,315	130	70	3,255	Second round lost to (United States) Shelby Rogers
10	10	(Spain) Garbiñe Muguruza	3,060	10	10	3,060	First round lost to (Estonia) Kaia Kanepi
11	11	(United States) Jessica Pegula	2,955	130	430	3,255	Quarterfinals lost to (Poland) Iga Świątek [1]
12	12	(United Kingdom) Emma Raducanu	2,910	(5)^{†}	70	2,975	Second round lost to Aliaksandra Sasnovich
13	13	(Latvia) Jeļena Ostapenko	2,536	10	70	2,596	Second round lost to (France) Alizé Cornet
14	14	(Switzerland) Belinda Bencic	2,525	70	130	2,585	Third round lost to (Canada) Leylah Fernandez [17]
15	15	Victoria Azarenka	2,440	240	130	2,330	Third round lost to (Switzerland) Jil Teichmann [23]
16	16	(Kazakhstan) Elena Rybakina	2,420	430	130	2,120	Third round lost to (United States) Madison Keys [22]
17	18	(Canada) Leylah Fernandez	2,245	70	430	2,605	Quarterfinals lost to (Italy) Martina Trevisan
18	23	(United States) Coco Gauff	1,886	430	1,300	2,756	Runner-up, lost to (Poland) Iga Świątek [1]
19	19	(Romania) Simona Halep	2,126	0	70	2,196	Second round lost to (China) Zheng Qinwen
20	20	Daria Kasatkina	2,115	130	780	2,765	Semifinals lost to (Poland) Iga Świątek [1]
21	17	(Germany) Angelique Kerber	2,354	10	130	2,474	Third round lost to (Belarus) Aliaksandra Sasnovich
22	22	(United States) Madison Keys	1,899	130	240	2,009	Fourth round lost to (Russia) Veronika Kudermetova [29]
23	24	(Switzerland) Jil Teichmann	1,783	0	240	2,023	Fourth round lost to (United States) Sloane Stephens
24	25	(Slovenia) Tamara Zidanšek	1,683	780	130	1,033	Third round lost to (United States) Jessica Pegula [11]
25	27	Liudmila Samsonova	1,670	(30)^{†}	10	1,650	First round lost to (Montenegro) Danka Kovinić
26	26	(Romania) Sorana Cîrstea	1,670	240+180	70+30	1,350	Second round lost to (United States) Sloane Stephens
27	28	(United States) Amanda Anisimova	1,610	10	240	1,840	Fourth round lost to (Canada) Leylah Fernandez [17]
28	30	(Italy) Camila Giorgi	1,583	70	240	1,753	Fourth round lost to (Russia) Daria Kasatkina [20]
29	29	Veronika Kudermetova	1,585	70	430	1,945	Quarterfinals lost to (Russia) Daria Kasatkina [20]
30	31	Ekaterina Alexandrova	1,531	70+60	70+55	1,526	Second round lost to (Romania) Irina-Camelia Begu
31	32	(Belgium) Elise Mertens	1,505	130	240	1,615	Fourth round lost to (United States) Coco Gauff [18]
32	34	(Czech Republic) Petra Kvitová	1,435	70	70	1,435	Second round lost to (Australia) Daria Saville [WC]

† The player did not qualify for the 2021 tournament. Accordingly, her 16th-best result will be deducted instead.

=== Withdrawn players ===
The following players would have been seeded, but withdrew before the tournament began.

Rank	Player	Points before	Points defending	Points after	Withdrawal reason
21	Anastasia Pavlyuchenkova	2,093	1,300	793	Knee injury
33	(Ukraine) Elina Svitolina	1,454	130	1,324	Back injury and subsequent pregnancy

== Other entry information ==
=== Wildcards ===
- (France) Tessah Andrianjafitrimo
- (France) Fiona Ferro
- (France) Elsa Jacquemot
- (France) Léolia Jeanjean
- (France) Carole Monnet
- (Australia) Daria Saville
- (France) Harmony Tan
- (United States) Katie Volynets

=== Protected ranking ===
- (Canada) Bianca Andreescu
- (Germany) Tatjana Maria
- (United States) Taylor Townsend

=== Qualifiers ===
- (United States) Hailey Baptiste
- (Romania) Irina Bara
- (Sweden) Mirjam Björklund
- (Belgium) Ysaline Bonaventure
- (Spain) Cristina Bucșa
- (Mexico) Fernanda Contreras Gómez
- (Serbia) Olga Danilović
- (Greece) Valentini Grammatikopoulou
- (Serbia) Aleksandra Krunić
- (Canada) Rebecca Marino
- (Germany) Jule Niemeier
- (Czech Republic) Linda Nosková
- Oksana Selekhmeteva
- (Ukraine) Lesia Tsurenko
- (Croatia) Donna Vekić
- (China) Zhu Lin

=== Lucky losers ===
- (Romania) Mihaela Buzărnescu
- Anastasia Gasanova
- (Hungary) Réka Luca Jani
- (Germany) Nastasja Schunk
- (Slovakia) Rebecca Šramková
- (Bulgaria) Viktoriya Tomova

=== Withdrawals ===
Before the tournament

- † (Romania) Jaqueline Cristian (70) → replaced by (United Kingdom) Harriet Dart (101)
- ‡ (United States) Sofia Kenin (4 PR) → replaced by (United States) Bernarda Pera (102)
- ‡ (Ukraine) Elina Svitolina (25) → replaced by (United Kingdom) Heather Watson (104)
- ‡ (Czech Republic) Markéta Vondroušová (32) → replaced by (France) Chloé Paquet (105) (Note: Last direct acceptance)
- @ Anastasia Pavlyuchenkova (15) → replaced by (Romania) Mihaela Buzărnescu (LL)
- @ (Denmark) Clara Tauson (38) → replaced by (Bulgaria) Viktoriya Tomova (LL)
- @ (Spain) Sara Sorribes Tormo (49) → replaced by (Hungary) Réka Luca Jani (LL)
- § (Croatia) Ana Konjuh (64) → replaced by (Germany) Nastasja Schunk (LL)
- § (Sweden) Rebecca Peterson (77) → replaced by (Slovakia) Rebecca Šramková (LL)
- § (United States) Lauren Davis (85) → replaced by Anastasia Gasanova (LL)

Rank date: 11 April 2022

† – not included on entry list
‡ – withdrew from entry list before qualifying began
@ – withdrew from entry list after qualifying began
§ – withdrew from main draw

During the tournament

- (Czech Republic) Marie Bouzková (due to positive COVID-19 test)
- (Egypt) Mayar Sherif

=== Retirements ===
- (Spain) Paula Badosa
- (United States) Hailey Baptiste
- (France) Alizé Cornet
- (United States) Ann Li
- (Czech Republic) Karolína Muchová

== Explanatory notes ==
Preceded by 2022 Australian Open – Women's singles	Grand Slam women's singles	Succeeded by 2022 Wimbledon Championships – Women's singles
