= Charlotte Kempenaers-Pocz =

Australian tennis player

- Country (sports): Australia
- Residence: Australia
- Born: 11 September 2004 (age 20); Glengowrie, Adelaide, Australia
- Plays: Right-handed (two-handed backhand)
- Prize money: US$86,415

Singles
- Career record: 12–13
- Highest ranking: No. 760 (14 November 2021)

Grand Slam singles results
- Australian Open: Q1 (2021, 2022)
- Australian Open Junior: SF (2022)
- French Open Junior: 1R (2022)
- US Open Junior: 1R (2022)

Doubles
- Career record: 3–10
- Highest ranking: No. 447 (26 December 2022)

Grand Slam doubles results
- Australian Open: 2R (2022)
- French Open: 1R (2022)
- Australian Open Junior: SF (2022)
- US Open Junior: 2R (2022)
- Last updated on: 28 July 2025.

Charlotte Kempenaers-Pocz (born 11 September 2004) is an Australian professional tennis player. Kempenaers-Pocz made her WTA Tour debut at the 2021 Yarra Valley Classic in the doubles, partnering Jaimee Fourlis after receiving a wild card into the main draw.

== Personal life ==
Kempenaers-Pocz was introduced to tennis at age five by her parents

== Career ==
=== 2019–2020s ===
Kempenaers-Pocz made her ITF Women's World Tennis Tour main draw debut in Port Pirie in February 2019, where she reached the semi-final as a 14-year-old.

=== 2021 ===
In January 2021, Kempenaers-Pocz lost in the first round of the 2021 Australian Open – Women's singles qualifying.

=== 2022: WTA debut ===
In January 2022, Kempenaers-Pocz lost in the first round of the 2022 Australian Open – Women's singles qualifying.

== Performance timelines ==
Key
W	F	SF	QF	#R	RR	Q#	P#	DNQ	A	Z#	PO	G	S	B	NMS	NTI	P	NH

(W) winner; (F) finalist; (SF) semifinalist; (QF) quarterfinalist; (#R) rounds 4, 3, 2, 1; (RR) round-robin stage; (Q#) qualification round; (P#) preliminary round; (DNQ) did not qualify; (A) absent; (Z#) Davis/Fed Cup Zonal Group (with number indication) or (PO) play-off; (G) gold, (S) silver or (B) bronze Olympic/Paralympic medal; (NMS) not a Masters tournament; (NTI) not a Tier I tournament; (P) postponed; (NH) not held; (SR) strike rate (events won / competed); (W–L) win–loss record.
To avoid confusion and double counting, these charts are updated at the conclusion of a tournament or when the player's participation has ended.

Only main-draw results in WTA Tour, Grand Slam tournaments, Fed Cup and Olympic Games are included in win–loss records.

=== Singles ===
Current after the 2022 US Open.

Tournament	2021	2022	SR	W–L	Win %
Grand Slam tournaments
Australian Open	Q1	Q1	0 / 0	0–0	–
French Open	A	A	0 / 0	0–0	–
Wimbledon	A	A	0 / 0	0–0	–
US Open	A	A	0 / 0	0–0	–
Win–loss	0–0	0–0	0 / 0	0–0	–
Career statistics
Tournaments	0	0	Career total:		
Titles	0	0	Career total: 0		
Finals	0	0	Career total: 0		
Overall win–loss	0–0	0–0	0 / 0	0–0	–
Year-end ranking	1409	768			
