= 2022 French Open – Mixed doubles =

Mixed doubles
- 2022 French Open

Final
- Champions: (Japan) Ena Shibahara (Netherlands) Wesley Koolhof
- Runners-up: (Norway) Ulrikke Eikeri (Belgium) Joran Vliegen
- Score: 7–6^{(7–5)}, 6–2

Details
- Draw: 32
- Seeds: 8

Events
Singles	men	women		boys	girls
Doubles	men	women	mixed	boys	girls
WC Singles	men	women	quad
WC Doubles	men	women	quad
Legends	men	women
- French Open

Ena Shibahara and Wesley Koolhof defeated Ulrikke Eikeri and Joran Vliegen in the final, 7–6^{(7–5)}, 6–2 to win the mixed doubles tennis title at the 2022 French Open.

According to The New York Times, Koolhof and Shibahara had never met before competing in this tournament.

Desirae Krawczyk and Joe Salisbury were the defending champions, but Salisbury chose not to defend his title. Krawczyk competed with Neal Skupski, but they lost in the quarterfinals to Eikeri and Vliegen.

== Seeds ==
1. (China) Zhang Shuai / (France) Nicolas Mahut (first round)
2. (Japan) Ena Shibahara / (Netherlands) Wesley Koolhof (champions)
3. (Canada) Gabriela Dabrowski / (Australia) John Peers (semifinals)
4. (United States) Desirae Krawczyk / (United Kingdom) Neal Skupski (quarterfinals)
5. (Slovenia) Andreja Klepač / (India) Rohan Bopanna (second round)
6. (Kazakhstan) Anna Danilina / (Kazakhstan) Andrey Golubev (first round)
7. (United States) Bernarda Pera / (Croatia) Mate Pavić (first round)
8. (Mexico) Giuliana Olmos / (El Salvador) Marcelo Arévalo (first round)

== Draw ==
Key

- Q = Qualifier
- WC = Wild card
- LL = Lucky loser
- Alt = Alternate
- ITF = ITF entry
- PR = Protected ranking
- SR = Special ranking
- SE = Special exempt
- JE = Junior exempt
- JR = Junior Accelerator Programme entrant
- CO = College Accelerator Programme entrant
- NG = Next Gen Accelerator Program entrant
- w/o = Walkover
- r = Retired
- d = Defaulted

=== Finals ===
Semifinals
(United States) Nicole Melichar-Martinez (Germany) Kevin Krawietz	6	6^{4}	[7]
(Norway) Ulrikke Eikeri (Belgium) Joran Vliegen	1	7^{7}	[10]
3	(Canada) Gabriela Dabrowski (Australia) John Peers	3	4
2	(Japan) Ena Shibahara (Netherlands) Wesley Koolhof	6	6

Final
(Norway) Ulrikke Eikeri (Belgium) Joran Vliegen	6^{5}	2
2	(Japan) Ena Shibahara (Netherlands) Wesley Koolhof	7^{7}	6

=== Top half ===
First round
1	(China) S Zhang (France) N Mahut	4	6	[8]
(Brazil) B Haddad Maia (Brazil) B Soares	6	4	[10]
(Germany) L Siegemund (Mexico) S González	6^{4}	2
(India) S Mirza (Croatia) I Dodig	7^{7}	6
WC	(France) C Paquet (France) B Paire	3	3
(Chinese Taipei) H-c Chan (Japan) B McLachlan	6	6
(United States) N Melichar-Martinez (Germany) K Krawietz	7	2	[11]
8	(Mexico) G Olmos (El Salvador) M Arévalo	5	6	[9]
4	(United States) D Krawczyk (United Kingdom) N Skupski	6	6
(Japan) S Aoyama (Monaco) H Nys	3	1
(Australia) S Sanders (Belgium) S Gillé	6	6
N Dzalamidze (Kazakhstan) A Bublik	1	3
(New Zealand) E Routliffe (Uruguay) A Behar	4	2
WC	(France) C Burel (France) H Gaston	6	6
(Norway) U Eikeri (Belgium) J Vliegen	4	6	[10]
6	(Kazakhstan) A Danilina (Kazakhstan) A Golubev	6	3	[5]

Second round
(Brazil) B Haddad Maia (Brazil) B Soares	6	6
(India) S Mirza (Croatia) I Dodig	4	3
(Chinese Taipei) H-c Chan (Japan) B McLachlan	4	5
(United States) N Melichar-Martinez (Germany) K Krawietz	6	7
4	(United States) D Krawczyk (United Kingdom) N Skupski	4	6	[10]
(Australia) S Sanders (Belgium) S Gillé	6	3	[8]
WC	(France) C Burel (France) H Gaston	4	3
(Norway) U Eikeri (Belgium) J Vliegen	6	6

Quarterfinals
(Brazil) B Haddad Maia (Brazil) B Soares	4	7^{7}	[10]
(United States) N Melichar-Martinez (Germany) K Krawietz	6	6^{2}	[12]
4	(United States) D Krawczyk (United Kingdom) N Skupski	6	6^{4}	[8]
(Norway) U Eikeri (Belgium) J Vliegen	2	7^{7}	[10]

Semifinals
(United States) N Melichar-Martinez (Germany) K Krawietz	6	6^{4}	[7]
(Norway) U Eikeri (Belgium) J Vliegen	1	7^{7}	[10]

=== Bottom half ===
First round
5	(Slovenia) A Klepač (India) R Bopanna	6	6
Alt	(United States) A Muhammad (United Kingdom) L Glasspool	1	4
(Czech Republic) L Hradecká (Ecuador) G Escobar	6	6
WC	(France) E Lechemia (India) R Ramanathan	4	4
(Poland) A Rosolska (Poland) Ł Kubot	6	7
WC	(France) O Dodin (France) E Couacaud	4	5
WC	(France) H Tan (France) J Eysseric	0	4
3	(Canada) G Dabrowski (Australia) J Peers	6	6
7	(United States) B Pera (Croatia) M Pavić	6	1	[4]
(Ukraine) L Kichenok (Brazil) R Matos	0	6	[10]
(Australia) S Stosur (Australia) M Ebden	6	6
WC	(France) T Andrianjafitrimo (France) F Martin	3	2
(United States) J Pegula (United States) A Krajicek	6^{6}	2
(Netherlands) D Schuurs (Netherlands) M Middelkoop	7^{8}	6
(Chile) A Guarachi (Netherlands) J-J Rojer	6	4	[6]
2	(Japan) E Shibahara (Netherlands) W Koolhof	3	6	[10]

Second round
5	(Slovenia) A Klepač (India) R Bopanna	6^{2}	4
(Czech Republic) L Hradecká (Ecuador) G Escobar	7^{7}	6
(Poland) A Rosolska (Poland) Ł Kubot	1	4
3	(Canada) G Dabrowski (Australia) J Peers	6	6
(Ukraine) L Kichenok (Brazil) R Matos	6	6^{3}	[8]
(Australia) S Stosur (Australia) M Ebden	2	7^{7}	[10]
(Netherlands) D Schuurs (Netherlands) M Middelkoop	3	4
2	(Japan) E Shibahara (Netherlands) W Koolhof	6	6

Quarterfinals
(Czech Republic) L Hradecká (Ecuador) G Escobar	5	2
3	(Canada) G Dabrowski (Australia) J Peers	7	6
(Australia) S Stosur (Australia) M Ebden	3	4
2	(Japan) E Shibahara (Netherlands) W Koolhof	6	6

Semifinals
3	(Canada) G Dabrowski (Australia) J Peers	3	4
2	(Japan) E Shibahara (Netherlands) W Koolhof	6	6

== Other entry information ==
=== Wild cards ===
- (France) Tessah Andrianjafitrimo / (France) Fabrice Martin
- (France) Clara Burel / (France) Hugo Gaston
- (France) Océane Dodin / (France) Enzo Couacaud
- (France) Elixane Lechemia / (India) Ramkumar Ramanathan
- (France) Chloé Paquet / (France) Benoît Paire
- (France) Harmony Tan / (France) Jonathan Eysseric

=== Alternates ===
- (United States) Asia Muhammad / (United Kingdom) Lloyd Glasspool

=== Withdrawals ===
- (France) Alizé Cornet / (France) Édouard Roger-Vasselin → replaced by (United States) Asia Muhammad / (United Kingdom) Lloyd Glasspool
