= 2022 Australian Open – Women's doubles =

Women's doubles
- 2022 Australian Open

Final
- Champions: (Czech Republic) Barbora Krejčíková (Czech Republic) Kateřina Siniaková
- Runners-up: (Kazakhstan) Anna Danilina (Brazil) Beatriz Haddad Maia
- Score: 6–7^{(3–7)}, 6–4, 6–4

Details
- Draw: 64
- Seeds: 16

Events
Singles	men	women		boys	girls
Doubles	men	women	mixed	boys	girls
WC Singles	men	women	quad	boys	girls
WC Doubles	men	women	quad	boys	girls
- Australian Open

Barbora Krejčíková and Kateřina Siniaková defeated Anna Danilina and Beatriz Haddad Maia in the final, 6–7^{(3–7)}, 6–4, 6–4 to win the women's doubles tennis title at the 2022 Australian Open. It was their fourth major title together.

Elise Mertens and Aryna Sabalenka were the reigning champions, but Sabalenka did not participate. Mertens partnered Veronika Kudermetova, but they were defeated in the semifinals by Krejčíková and Siniaková.

Mertens was in contention for the world No. 1 doubles ranking, but Siniaková retained the top ranking by reaching the semifinals.

Anna Danilina became the first Kazakhstani woman to reach the final of the tournament. Haddad Maia became the first Brazilian woman to reach a major doubles final since Maria Bueno at the 1968 US Open.

== Seeds ==
1. (Czech Republic) Barbora Krejčíková / (Czech Republic) Kateřina Siniaková (champions)
2. (Japan) Shuko Aoyama / (Japan) Ena Shibahara (semifinals)
3. (Russia) Veronika Kudermetova / (Belgium) Elise Mertens (semifinals)
4. (Australia) Samantha Stosur / (China) Zhang Shuai (second round)
5. (Chile) Alexa Guarachi / (United States) Nicole Melichar-Martinez (third round)
6. (Canada) Gabriela Dabrowski / (Mexico) Giuliana Olmos (second round)
7. (Croatia) Darija Jurak Schreiber / (Slovenia) Andreja Klepač (first round)
8. (United States) Coco Gauff / (United States) Caty McNally (first round)

9. (United States) Caroline Dolehide / (Australia) Storm Sanders (quarterfinals)
10. (Czech Republic) Marie Bouzková / (Czech Republic) Lucie Hradecká (second round)
11. (Ukraine) Lyudmyla Kichenok / (Latvia) Jeļena Ostapenko (second round)
12. (Ukraine) Nadiia Kichenok / (India) Sania Mirza (first round)
13. (United States) Asia Muhammad / (United States) Jessica Pegula (second round)
14. (China) Xu Yifan / (China) Yang Zhaoxuan (third round)
15. (Romania) Irina-Camelia Begu / (Serbia) Nina Stojanović (first round)
16. (Slovakia) Viktória Kužmová / (Russia) Vera Zvonareva (third round)

Click on the seed number of a player to go to their draw section.

== Draw ==
Key

- Q = Qualifier
- WC = Wild card
- LL = Lucky loser
- Alt = Alternate
- ITF = ITF entry
- PR = Protected ranking
- SR = Special ranking
- SE = Special exempt
- JE = Junior exempt
- JR = Junior Accelerator Programme entrant
- CO = College Accelerator Programme entrant
- NG = Next Gen Accelerator Program entrant
- w/o = Walkover
- r = Retired
- d = Defaulted

=== Finals ===
Quarterfinals
1	(Czech Republic) Barbora Krejčíková (Czech Republic) Kateřina Siniaková	6	7^{7}
9	(United States) Caroline Dolehide (Australia) Storm Sanders	2	6^{3}
3	(Russia) Veronika Kudermetova (Belgium) Elise Mertens	6	6
PR	(Belgium) Kirsten Flipkens (Spain) Sara Sorribes Tormo	3	4
(Kazakhstan) Anna Danilina (Brazil) Beatriz Haddad Maia	4	7	6
(Sweden) Rebecca Peterson (Russia) Anastasia Potapova	6	5	3
(Croatia) Petra Martić (United States) Shelby Rogers	1	4
2	(Japan) Shuko Aoyama (Japan) Ena Shibahara	6	6

Semifinals
1	(Czech Republic) Barbora Krejčíková (Czech Republic) Kateřina Siniaková	6	6
3	(Russia) Veronika Kudermetova (Belgium) Elise Mertens	2	3
(Kazakhstan) Anna Danilina (Brazil) Beatriz Haddad Maia	6	5	6
2	(Japan) Shuko Aoyama (Japan) Ena Shibahara	4	7	4

Final
1	(Czech Republic) Barbora Krejčíková (Czech Republic) Kateřina Siniaková	6^{3}	6	6
(Kazakhstan) Anna Danilina (Brazil) Beatriz Haddad Maia	7^{7}	4	4

=== Top half ===
==== Section 1 ====
First round
1	(Czech Republic) B Krejčíková (Czech Republic) K Siniaková	6	6
(Netherlands) L Pattinama Kerkhove (Australia) Ar Rodionova	0	2
(United States) M Brengle (Germany) T Maria	4	7^{7}	3
PR	(Australia) M Adamczak (China) X Han	6	6^{1}	6
(United States) D Collins (United States) D Krawczyk	6	6
(Russia) D Kasatkina (Russia) L Samsonova	3	3
(Montenegro) D Kovinić (Serbia) A Krunić	1	1
13	(United States) A Muhammad (United States) J Pegula	6	6
9	(United States) C Dolehide (Australia) S Sanders	6	6
Alt	(Slovakia) AK Schmiedlová (Belgium) K Zimmermann	3	2
(Japan) E Hozumi (Japan) M Ninomiya	6	6
(Poland) K Piter (Egypt) M Sherif	2	4
(Italy) J Paolini (United Kingdom) H Watson	7^{7}	4	6
WC	(Australia) A Bozovic (Australia) O Tjandramulia	6^{4}	6	2
(Ukraine) M Kostyuk (Ukraine) D Yastremska	5	6	7
8	(United States) C Gauff (United States) C McNally	7	4	5

Second round
1	(Czech Republic) B Krejčíková (Czech Republic) K Siniaková	6	6
PR	(Australia) M Adamczak (China) X Han	3	3
(United States) D Collins (United States) D Krawczyk	6	7^{7}
13	(United States) A Muhammad (United States) J Pegula	3	6^{2}
9	(United States) C Dolehide (Australia) S Sanders	5	7^{7}	7^{10}
(Japan) E Hozumi (Japan) M Ninomiya	7	6^{2}	6^{7}
(Italy) J Paolini (United Kingdom) H Watson	4	3
(Ukraine) M Kostyuk (Ukraine) D Yastremska	6	6

Third round
1	(Czech Republic) B Krejčíková (Czech Republic) K Siniaková	6	6
(United States) D Collins (United States) D Krawczyk	4	4
9	(United States) C Dolehide (Australia) S Sanders	6	6
(Ukraine) M Kostyuk (Ukraine) D Yastremska	4	4

Quarterfinals
1	(Czech Republic) B Krejčíková (Czech Republic) K Siniaková	6	7^{7}
9	(United States) C Dolehide (Australia) S Sanders	2	6^{3}

==== Section 2 ====
First round
3	(Russia) V Kudermetova (Belgium) E Mertens	6^{5}	6	6
(Russia) A Blinkova (Belarus) A Sasnovich	7^{7}	3	3
WC	(Australia) S Mendez (Australia) T Preston	4	2
(France) C Garcia (France) K Mladenovic	6	6
(Germany) A-L Friedsam (Romania) R Olaru	6	6
WC	(France) A Cornet (France) D Parry	4	4
(United States) S Kenin (Kazakhstan) Y Putintseva	5	6	1
14	(China) Y Xu (China) Z Yang	7	4	6
12	(Ukraine) N Kichenok (India) S Mirza	4	6^{5}
(Slovenia) K Juvan (Slovenia) T Zidanšek	6	7^{7}
(Romania) S Halep (Romania) E-G Ruse	4	0
(Romania) J Cristian (Germany) A Petkovic	6	6
(Germany) J Lohoff (Belgium) M Zanevska	5	4
PR	(Belgium) K Flipkens (Spain) S Sorribes Tormo	7	6
(France) C Burel (Colombia) C Osorio	2	3
6	(Canada) G Dabrowski (Mexico) G Olmos	6	6

Second round
3	(Russia) V Kudermetova (Belgium) E Mertens	6	3	6
(France) C Garcia (France) K Mladenovic	4	6	2
(Germany) A-L Friedsam (Romania) R Olaru	2	3
14	(China) Y Xu (China) Z Yang	6	6
(Slovenia) K Juvan (Slovenia) T Zidanšek	4	0
(Romania) J Cristian (Germany) A Petkovic	6	6
PR	(Belgium) K Flipkens (Spain) S Sorribes Tormo	6	6^{3}	6
6	(Canada) G Dabrowski (Mexico) G Olmos	4	7^{7}	2

Third round
3	(Russia) V Kudermetova (Belgium) E Mertens	7^{7}	6
14	(China) Y Xu (China) Z Yang	6^{5}	4
(Romania) J Cristian (Germany) A Petkovic	1	2
PR	(Belgium) K Flipkens (Spain) S Sorribes Tormo	6	6

Quarterfinals
3	(Russia) V Kudermetova (Belgium) E Mertens	6	6
PR	(Belgium) K Flipkens (Spain) S Sorribes Tormo	3	4

=== Bottom half ===
==== Section 3 ====
First round
7	(Croatia) D Jurak Schreiber (Slovenia) A Klepač	4	3
(Czech Republic) T Martincová (Czech Republic) M Vondroušová	6	6
(Kazakhstan) A Danilina (Brazil) B Haddad Maia	6	6
Alt	(Hungary) A Bondár (Georgia (country)) O Kalashnikova	4	4
(Spain) A Bolsova (Norway) U Eikeri	6	3	6
Alt	(France) E Lechemia (United States) I Neel	4	6	2
(Romania) I Bara (Georgia (country)) E Gorgodze	3	4
10	(Czech Republic) M Bouzková (Czech Republic) L Hradecká	6	6
15	(Romania) I-C Begu (Serbia) N Stojanović	6	3	5
(Sweden) R Peterson (Russia) A Potapova	2	6	7
(Spain) N Párrizas Díaz (Netherlands) A Rus	3	6	4
WC	(Australia) K Birrell (Australia) C Kempenaers-Pocz	6	2	6
(Poland) M Linette (United States) B Pera	6	2	6
(Denmark) C Tauson (Belgium) A Van Uytvanck	2	6	0
(Japan) M Kato (United States) S Santamaria	3	6	1
4	(Australia) S Stosur (China) S Zhang	6	2	6

Second round
(Czech Republic) T Martincová (Czech Republic) M Vondroušová	6	3	2
(Kazakhstan) A Danilina (Brazil) B Haddad Maia	4	6	6
(Spain) A Bolsova (Norway) U Eikeri	7^{7}	6
10	(Czech Republic) M Bouzková (Czech Republic) L Hradecká	6^{3}	3
(Sweden) R Peterson (Russia) A Potapova	4	6	6
WC	(Australia) K Birrell (Australia) C Kempenaers-Pocz	6	4	2
(Poland) M Linette (United States) B Pera	6^{6}	6	7
4	(Australia) S Stosur (China) S Zhang	7^{8}	1	5

Third round
(Kazakhstan) A Danilina (Brazil) B Haddad Maia	3	6	7^{10}
(Spain) A Bolsova (Norway) U Eikeri	6	4	6^{5}
(Sweden) R Peterson (Russia) A Potapova	6	7^{8}
(Poland) M Linette (United States) B Pera	3	6^{6}

Quarterfinals
(Kazakhstan) A Danilina (Brazil) B Haddad Maia	4	7	6
(Sweden) R Peterson (Russia) A Potapova	6	5	3

==== Section 4 ====
First round
5	(Chile) A Guarachi (United States) N Melichar-Martinez	6	6
WC	(Thailand) P Plipuech (Indonesia) A Sutjiadi	4	2
(Belgium) G Minnen (Australia) E Perez	6	6
WC	(Australia) J Fourlis (Australia) M Inglis	3	1
(Croatia) P Martić (United States) S Rogers	6	7^{7}
(United States) K Christian (Belarus) L Marozava	1	6^{4}
(Switzerland) V Golubic (Switzerland) J Teichmann	3	1
11	(Ukraine) L Kichenok (Latvia) J Ostapenko	6	6
16	(Slovakia) V Kužmová (Russia) V Zvonareva	6	6
(Russia) V Gracheva (Ukraine) A Kalinina	2	4
(United States) A Li (United States) A Riske	6	6^{6}	4
PR	(Japan) N Hibino (Poland) A Rosolska	3	7^{8}	6
(Canada) L Fernandez (New Zealand) E Routliffe	3	1
WC	(Australia) L Cabrera (Australia) P Hon	6	6
(Georgia (country)) N Dzalamidze (Russia) K Rakhimova	6	3	1
2	(Japan) S Aoyama (Japan) E Shibahara	4	6	6

Second round
5	(Chile) A Guarachi (United States) N Melichar-Martinez	6	7
(Belgium) G Minnen (Australia) E Perez	3	5
(Croatia) P Martić (United States) S Rogers	6	4	6
11	(Ukraine) L Kichenok (Latvia) J Ostapenko	2	6	1
16	(Slovakia) V Kužmová (Russia) V Zvonareva	6	6
PR	(Japan) N Hibino (Poland) A Rosolska	3	4
WC	(Australia) L Cabrera (Australia) P Hon	3	2
2	(Japan) S Aoyama (Japan) E Shibahara	6	6

Third round
5	(Chile) A Guarachi (United States) N Melichar-Martinez	2	6^{2}
(Croatia) P Martić (United States) S Rogers	6	7^{7}
16	(Slovakia) V Kužmová (Russia) V Zvonareva	6	5	3
2	(Japan) S Aoyama (Japan) E Shibahara	1	7	6

Quarterfinals
(Croatia) P Martić (United States) S Rogers	1	4
2	(Japan) S Aoyama (Japan) E Shibahara	6	6

== Other entry information ==
=== Wild cards ===
- (Australia) Kimberly Birrell / (Australia) Charlotte Kempenaers-Pocz
- (Australia) Alexandra Bozovic / (Australia) Olivia Tjandramulia
- (Australia) Lizette Cabrera / (Australia) Priscilla Hon
- (France) Alizé Cornet / (France) Diane Parry
- (Australia) Jaimee Fourlis / (Australia) Maddison Inglis
- (Australia) Seone Mendez / (Australia) Taylah Preston
- (Thailand) Peangtarn Plipuech / (Indonesia) Aldila Sutjiadi

=== Protected ranking ===
- (Australia) Monique Adamczak / (China) Han Xinyun
- (Belgium) Kirsten Flipkens / (Spain) Sara Sorribes Tormo
- (Poland) Alicja Rosolska / (Japan) Nao Hibino

=== Alternates ===
- (Hungary) Anna Bondár / (Georgia (country)) Oksana Kalashnikova
- (Slovakia) Anna Karolína Schmiedlová / (Belgium) Kimberley Zimmermann
- (France) Elixane Lechemia / (United States) Ingrid Neel

=== Withdrawals ===
Before the tournament

- (Spain) Paula Badosa / (Kazakhstan) Elena Rybakina → replaced by (Hungary) Anna Bondár / (Georgia (country)) Oksana Kalashnikova
- (Chinese Taipei) Chan Hao-ching / (Romania) Monica Niculescu → replaced by (United States) Madison Brengle / (Germany) Tatjana Maria
- (Brazil) Beatriz Haddad Maia / (Argentina) Nadia Podoroska → replaced by (Kazakhstan) Anna Danilina / (Brazil) Beatriz Haddad Maia
- (Russia) Anna Kalinskaya / (Ukraine) Marta Kostyuk → replaced by (Ukraine) Marta Kostyuk / (Ukraine) Dayana Yastremska
- (United States) Desirae Krawczyk / (United States) Bethanie Mattek-Sands → replaced by (United States) Danielle Collins / (United States) Desirae Krawczyk
- (Australia) Astra Sharma / (Australia) Ajla Tomljanović → replaced by (Slovakia) Anna Karolína Schmiedlová / (Belgium) Kimberley Zimmermann
- (Egypt) Mayar Sherif / (Czech Republic) Renata Voráčová → replaced by (Poland) Katarzyna Piter / (Egypt) Mayar Sherif
- (China) Wang Xinyu / (China) Zheng Saisai → replaced by (France) Elixane Lechemia / (United States) Ingrid Neel
