= 2022 French Open – Women's doubles =

Women's doubles
- 2022 French Open

Final
- Champions: (France) Caroline Garcia (France) Kristina Mladenovic
- Runners-up: (United States) Coco Gauff (United States) Jessica Pegula
- Score: 2–6, 6–3, 6–2

Events
Singles	men	women		boys	girls
Doubles	men	women	mixed	boys	girls
WC Singles	men	women	quad
WC Doubles	men	women	quad
Legends	men	women
← 2021 ·	French Open	· 2023 →

Caroline Garcia and Kristina Mladenovic defeated Coco Gauff and Jessica Pegula in the final, 2–6, 6–3, 6–2 to win the women's doubles tennis title at the 2022 French Open. It was their second French Open title as a team (the first being in 2016). Mladenovic extended her winning streak at the event to 18 consecutive match wins and three titles, having last lost in the quarterfinals of the 2018 tournament (she did not play in 2021).

Barbora Krejčíková and Kateřina Siniaková were the reigning champions, but were unable to defend their title as Krejčíková tested positive for COVID-19 before their first round match. As a result, Elise Mertens regained the WTA No. 1 doubles ranking from Siniaková. The elimination of Sania Mirza and Lucie Hradecká in the third round guaranteed two first-time French Open doubles finalists from the top half of the draw, those ultimately being Gauff and Pegula.

Mertens and Mirza were vying to complete the career Grand Slam, but Mertens lost in the third round to Xu Yifan and Yang Zhaoxuan, while Mirza lost in the third round to Gauff and Pegula.

== Seeds ==
1. (Czech Republic) Barbora Krejčíková / (Czech Republic) Kateřina Siniaková (withdrew)
2. Veronika Kudermetova / (Belgium) Elise Mertens (third round)
3. (Canada) Gabriela Dabrowski / (Mexico) Giuliana Olmos (third round)
4. (United States) Caty McNally / (China) Zhang Shuai (third round)
5. (United States) Desirae Krawczyk / (Netherlands) Demi Schuurs (second round)
6. (Chile) Alexa Guarachi / (Slovenia) Andreja Klepač (first round)
7. (United States) Caroline Dolehide / (Australia) Storm Sanders (second round)
8. (United States) Coco Gauff / (United States) Jessica Pegula (final)

9. (United States) Asia Muhammad / (Japan) Ena Shibahara (third round)
10. (Czech Republic) Lucie Hradecká / (India) Sania Mirza (third round)
11. (Japan) Shuko Aoyama / (Chinese Taipei) Chan Hao-ching (first round)
12. (Kazakhstan) Anna Danilina / (Brazil) Beatriz Haddad Maia (second round)
13. (China) Xu Yifan / (China) Yang Zhaoxuan (quarterfinals)
14. (Ukraine) Lyudmyla Kichenok / (Latvia) Jeļena Ostapenko (semifinals)
15. (Poland) Magda Linette / (United States) Bernarda Pera (first round)
16. (United States) Nicole Melichar-Martinez / (Australia) Ellen Perez (first round)

== Draw ==
=== Key ===
- Q = Qualifier
- WC = Wild card
- LL = Lucky loser
- Alt = Alternate
- ITF = ITF entry
- PR = Protected ranking
- SR = Special ranking
- SE = Special exempt
- JE = Junior exempt
- JR = Junior Accelerator Programme entrant
- CO = College Accelerator Programme entrant
- NG = Next Gen Accelerator Program entrant
- w/o = Walkover
- r = Retired
- d = Defaulted

=== Finals ===
Quarterfinals
(Hungary) Anna Bondár (Belgium) Greet Minnen	4	6	4
8	(United States) Coco Gauff (United States) Jessica Pegula	6	4	6
(Ukraine) Marta Kostyuk (Romania) Elena-Gabriela Ruse	6^{5}	6	5
PR	(United States) Madison Keys (United States) Taylor Townsend	7^{7}	2	7
(Belgium) Maryna Zanevska (Belgium) Kimberley Zimmermann	3	7	2
14	(Ukraine) Lyudmyla Kichenok (Latvia) Jeļena Ostapenko	6	5	6
WC	(France) Caroline Garcia (France) Kristina Mladenovic	6	6
13	(China) Xu Yifan (China) Yang Zhaoxuan	3	3

Semifinals
8	(United States) Coco Gauff (United States) Jessica Pegula	6	7^{7}
PR	(United States) Madison Keys (United States) Taylor Townsend	4	6^{4}
14	(Ukraine) Lyudmyla Kichenok (Latvia) Jeļena Ostapenko	6	4	2
WC	(France) Caroline Garcia (France) Kristina Mladenovic	2	6	6

Final
8	(United States) Coco Gauff (United States) Jessica Pegula	6	3	2
WC	(France) Caroline Garcia (France) Kristina Mladenovic	2	6	6

=== Top half ===
==== Section 1 ====
First round
Alt	(Germany) A-L Friedsam (Germany) T Maria	4	3
(Hungary) D Gálfi; A Kalinskaya	6	6
(Hungary) A Bondár (Belgium) G Minnen	w/o
(France) A Cornet (France) D Parry
V Gracheva (Georgia (country)) O Kalashnikova	6	5	3
(United States) K Christian; L Marozava	3	7	6
(Poland) A Rosolska (New Zealand) E Routliffe	6	7
16	(United States) N Melichar-Martinez (Australia) E Perez	2	5
10	(Czech Republic) L Hradecká (India) S Mirza	4	6	6
(Italy) J Paolini (Italy) M Trevisan	6	2	1
(Slovenia) K Juvan (Slovenia) T Zidanšek	6	6
WC	(France) T Andrianjafitrimo (France) O Dodin	0	3
(Romania) M Niculescu (Belgium) A Van Uytvanck	3	6	6
(United States) D Collins (Kazakhstan) Y Putintseva	6	3	1
(Kazakhstan) E Rybakina; L Samsonova	3	5
8	(United States) C Gauff (United States) J Pegula	6	7

Second round
(Hungary) D Gálfi; A Kalinskaya	5	3
(Hungary) A Bondár (Belgium) G Minnen	7	6
(United States) K Christian; L Marozava	2	2
(Poland) A Rosolska (New Zealand) E Routliffe	6	6
10	(Czech Republic) L Hradecká (India) S Mirza	6	6
(Slovenia) K Juvan (Slovenia) T Zidanšek	3	4
(Romania) M Niculescu (Belgium) A Van Uytvanck	3	1
8	(United States) C Gauff (United States) J Pegula	6	6

Third round
(Hungary) A Bondár (Belgium) G Minnen	6^{4}	7	7
(Poland) A Rosolska (New Zealand) E Routliffe	7^{7}	5	5
10	(Czech Republic) L Hradecká (India) S Mirza	4	3
8	(United States) C Gauff (United States) J Pegula	6	6

Quarterfinals
(Hungary) A Bondár (Belgium) G Minnen	4	6	4
8	(United States) C Gauff (United States) J Pegula	6	4	6

==== Section 2 ====
First round
4	(United States) C McNally (China) S Zhang	6	6
(Italy) L Bronzetti (Germany) J Lohoff	2	2
(Japan) M Kato (Indonesia) A Sutjiadi	7^{7}	2	6
(Czech Republic) T Martincová (Germany) A Petkovic	6^{2}	6	2
Alt	(United Kingdom) S Murray Sharan (United Kingdom) H Watson	6	6
(United States) M Brengle (Australia) Ar Rodionova	1	3
(Ukraine) M Kostyuk (Romania) E-G Ruse	3	6	6
15	(Poland) M Linette (United States) B Pera	6	2	3
9	(United States) A Muhammad (Japan) E Shibahara	6	6
WC	(France) E Jacquemot (France) S Janicijevic	2	1
WC	(France) C Burel (France) C Paquet	3	2
(Slovakia) K Kučová; A Potapova	6	6
(Romania) I Bara (Georgia (country)) E Gorgodze	2	6^{6}
PR	(United States) M Keys (United States) T Townsend	6	7^{8}
N Dzalamidze; K Rakhimova	3	5
7	(United States) C Dolehide (Australia) S Sanders	6	7

Second round
4	(United States) C McNally (China) S Zhang	6	6
(Japan) M Kato (Indonesia) A Sutjiadi	3	4
Alt	(United Kingdom) S Murray Sharan (United Kingdom) H Watson	2	6^{6}
(Ukraine) M Kostyuk (Romania) E-G Ruse	6	7^{8}
9	(United States) A Muhammad (Japan) E Shibahara	6	6
(Slovakia) K Kučová; A Potapova	4	3
PR	(United States) M Keys (United States) T Townsend	4	6	6
7	(United States) C Dolehide (Australia) S Sanders	6	1	2

Third round
4	(United States) C McNally (China) S Zhang	6	3	4
(Ukraine) M Kostyuk (Romania) E-G Ruse	4	6	6
9	(United States) A Muhammad (Japan) E Shibahara	6^{12}	2
PR	(United States) M Keys (United States) T Townsend	7^{14}	6

Quarterfinals
(Ukraine) M Kostyuk (Romania) E-G Ruse	6^{5}	6	5
PR	(United States) M Keys (United States) T Townsend	7^{7}	2	7

=== Bottom half ===
==== Section 3 ====
First round
5	(United States) D Krawczyk (Netherlands) D Schuurs	6	6
(Spain) N Párrizas Díaz (Poland) K Piter	0	3
(Poland) K Kawa (Slovakia) T Mihalíková	1	6	1
(Belgium) M Zanevska (Belgium) K Zimmermann	6	3	6
(Chinese Taipei) L Chan (Australia) S Stosur	6	7^{8}
(Serbia) A Krunić; A Panova	4	6^{6}
(Japan) E Hozumi (Japan) M Ninomiya	6	4	4
12	(Kazakhstan) A Danilina (Brazil) B Haddad Maia	4	6	6
14	(Ukraine) L Kichenok (Latvia) J Ostapenko	6	6
WC	(France) E Lechemia (France) H Tan	4	2
PR	(China) X Han (China) L Zhu	4	7	6
(Slovakia) V Kužmová (United States) S Santamaria	6	5	3
Alt	(United States) E Bektas (United Kingdom) T Moore	7	7
(Switzerland) B Bencic (Ukraine) A Kalinina	5	5
A Blinkova; A Sasnovich	2	3
3	(Canada) G Dabrowski (Mexico) G Olmos	6	6

Second round
5	(United States) D Krawczyk (Netherlands) D Schuurs	6^{4}	4
(Belgium) M Zanevska (Belgium) K Zimmermann	7^{7}	6
(Chinese Taipei) L Chan (Australia) S Stosur	6	6
12	(Kazakhstan) A Danilina (Brazil) B Haddad Maia	3	2
14	(Ukraine) L Kichenok (Latvia) J Ostapenko	0	6	6
PR	(China) X Han (China) L Zhu	6	1	2
Alt	(United States) E Bektas (United Kingdom) T Moore
3	(Canada) G Dabrowski (Mexico) G Olmos	w/o

Third round
(Belgium) M Zanevska (Belgium) K Zimmermann	1	6	6
(Chinese Taipei) L Chan (Australia) S Stosur	6	3	4
14	(Ukraine) L Kichenok (Latvia) J Ostapenko	6	4	7
3	(Canada) G Dabrowski (Mexico) G Olmos	4	6	5

Quarterfinals
(Belgium) M Zanevska (Belgium) K Zimmermann	3	7	2
14	(Ukraine) L Kichenok (Latvia) J Ostapenko	6	5	6

==== Section 4 ====
First round
6	(Chile) A Guarachi (Slovenia) A Klepač	2	4
(Norway) U Eikeri (United States) C Harrison	6	6
(Japan) M Doi (Australia) A Tomljanović	6	4	6
(Germany) V Heisen (Hungary) P Udvardy	4	6	0
WC	(France) C Garcia (France) K Mladenovic	6	4	6
E Alexandrova (Germany) L Siegemund	4	6	3
(Romania) I-C Begu (Colombia) C Osorio	6	7
11	(Japan) S Aoyama (Chinese Taipei) H-c Chan	3	5
13	(China) Y Xu (China) Z Yang	7^{7}	6^{5}	6
WC	(France) E Cascino (France) J Ponchet	6^{3}	7^{7}	3
(Ukraine) N Kichenok (Romania) R Olaru	7^{11}	4	6^{7}
(Switzerland) V Golubic (Switzerland) J Teichmann	6^{9}	6	7^{10}
WC	(Australia) O Gadecki (Australia) C Kempenaers-Pocz	2	1
(Canada) L Fernandez (Belgium) K Flipkens	6	6
(Croatia) P Martić (United States) S Rogers	6^{2}	0
2	V Kudermetova (Belgium) E Mertens	7^{7}	6

Second round
(Norway) U Eikeri (United States) C Harrison	6^{4}	3
(Japan) M Doi (Australia) A Tomljanović	7^{7}	6
WC	(France) C Garcia (France) K Mladenovic	6	6
(Romania) I-C Begu (Colombia) C Osorio	0	4
13	(China) Y Xu (China) Z Yang	w/o
(Switzerland) V Golubic (Switzerland) J Teichmann
(Canada) L Fernandez (Belgium) K Flipkens	2	2
2	V Kudermetova (Belgium) E Mertens	6	6

Third round
(Japan) M Doi (Australia) A Tomljanović	7	4	2
WC	(France) C Garcia (France) K Mladenovic	5	6	6
13	(China) Y Xu (China) Z Yang	6	2	6
2	V Kudermetova (Belgium) E Mertens	4	6	3

Quarterfinals
WC	(France) C Garcia (France) K Mladenovic	6	6
13	(China) Y Xu (China) Z Yang	3	3

== Seeded teams ==
The following are the seeded teams, based on WTA rankings as of 16 May 2022.

Country	Player	Country	Player	Rank	Seed
~~CZE~~	~~Barbora Krejčiková~~	~~CZE~~	~~Kateřina Siniaková~~	~~4~~	~~1~~
	Veronika Kudermetova	BEL	Elise Mertens	6	2
CAN	Gabriela Dabrowski	MEX	Giuliana Olmos	21	3
USA	Caty McNally	CHN	Zhang Shuai	23	4
USA	Desirae Krawczyk	NED	Demi Schuurs	26	5
CHI	Alexa Guarachi	SLO	Andreja Klepač	34	6
USA	Caroline Dolehide	AUS	Storm Sanders	37	7
USA	Coco Gauff	USA	Jessica Pegula	41	8
USA	Asia Muhammad	JPN	Ena Shibahara	45	9
CZE	Lucie Hradecká	IND	Sania Mirza	47	10
JPN	Shuko Aoyama	TPE	Chan Hao-ching	53	11
KAZ	Anna Danilina	BRA	Beatriz Haddad Maia	54	12
CHN	Xu Yifan	CHN	Yang Zhaoxuan	59	13
LAT	Jeļena Ostapenko	UKR	Lyudmyla Kichenok	62	14
POL	Magda Linette	USA	Bernarda Pera	66	15
USA	Nicole Melichar-Martinez	AUS	Ellen Perez	78	16

== Other entry information ==
=== Wildcards ===
- (France) Tessah Andrianjafitrimo / (France) Océane Dodin
- (France) Clara Burel / (France) Chloé Paquet
- (France) Estelle Cascino / (France) Jessika Ponchet
- (Australia) Olivia Gadecki / (Australia) Charlotte Kempenaers-Pocz
- (France) Caroline Garcia / (France) Kristina Mladenovic
- (France) Elsa Jacquemot / (France) Selena Janicijevic
- (France) Elixane Lechemia / (France) Harmony Tan

=== Protected ranking ===
- (United States) Madison Keys / (United States) Taylor Townsend
- (China) Han Xinyun / (China) Zhu Lin

=== Alternates ===
- (United States) Emina Bektas / (United Kingdom) Tara Moore
- (Germany) Anna-Lena Friedsam / (Germany) Tatjana Maria
- (United Kingdom) Samantha Murray Sharan / (United Kingdom) Heather Watson

=== Withdrawals ===
- (Spain) Aliona Bolsova / (Czech Republic) Marie Bouzková → replaced by (United States) Emina Bektas / (United Kingdom) Tara Moore
- Anna Kalinskaya / (Croatia) Ana Konjuh → replaced by (Hungary) Dalma Gálfi / Anna Kalinskaya
- (Czech Republic) Barbora Krejčíková / (Czech Republic) Kateřina Siniaková → replaced by (Germany) Anna-Lena Friedsam / (Germany) Tatjana Maria
- (Germany) Andrea Petkovic / (Denmark) Clara Tauson → replaced by (Czech Republic) Tereza Martincová / (Germany) Andrea Petkovic
- (Netherlands) Arantxa Rus / (Egypt) Mayar Sherif → replaced by (United Kingdom) Samantha Murray Sharan / (United Kingdom) Heather Watson
