= 2022 French Open – Girls' singles =

Girls' singles
- 2022 French Open

Final
- Champion: (Czech Republic) Lucie Havlíčková
- Runner-up: (Argentina) Solana Sierra
- Score: 6–3, 6–3

Events
Singles	men	women		boys	girls
Doubles	men	women	mixed	boys	girls
WC Singles	men	women	quad
WC Doubles	men	women	quad
Legends	men	women
- French Open

Lucie Havlíčková won the title, defeating Solana Sierra in the final, 6–3, 6–3.

Linda Nosková was the defending champion, but chose not to participate. She qualified for the women's singles event, where she lost to Emma Raducanu in the first round.

== Seeds ==
1. (Croatia) Petra Marčinko (third round)
2. (Belgium) Sofia Costoulas (first round)
3. (Andorra) Victoria Jiménez Kasintseva (second round)
4. (Czech Republic) Brenda Fruhvirtová (first round)
5. (Russia) Diana Shnaider (second round)
6. (United States) Liv Hovde (quarterfinals)
7. (Switzerland) Céline Naef (third round)
8. (Russia) Ksenia Zaytseva (first round)

9. (Czech Republic) Lucie Havlíčková (champion)
10. (Czech Republic) Sára Bejlek (semifinals)
11. (Canada) Victoria Mboko (third round)
12. (Slovakia) Nikola Daubnerová (quarterfinals)
13. (Czech Republic) Nikola Bartůňková (semifinals)
14. (Russia) Mirra Andreeva (quarterfinals)
15. (United States) Qavia Lopez (first round)
16. (France) Yaroslava Bartashevich (third round)

Click on the seed number of a player to go to their draw section.

== Draw ==
Key

- Q = Qualifier
- WC = Wild card
- LL = Lucky loser
- Alt = Alternate
- ITF = ITF entry
- PR = Protected ranking
- SR = Special ranking
- SE = Special exempt
- JE = Junior exempt
- JR = Junior Accelerator Programme entrant
- CO = College Accelerator Programme entrant
- NG = Next Gen Accelerator Program entrant
- w/o = Walkover
- r = Retired
- d = Defaulted

=== Finals ===
Quarterfinals
13	(Czech Republic) Nikola Bartůňková	6	6
12	(Slovakia) Nikola Daubnerová	3	0
(Argentina) Solana Sierra	6	7
6	(United States) Liv Hovde	3	5
9	(Czech Republic) Lucie Havlíčková	7^{7}	4	6
(Canada) Annabelle Xu	6^{5}	6	1
10	(Czech Republic) Sára Bejlek	6	6
14	Mirra Andreeva	4	1

Semifinals
13	(Czech Republic) Nikola Bartůňková	5	0
(Argentina) Solana Sierra	7	6
9	(Czech Republic) Lucie Havlíčková	6	6^{2}	7
10	(Czech Republic) Sára Bejlek	3	7^{7}	5

Final
(Argentina) Solana Sierra	3	3
9	(Czech Republic) Lucie Havlíčková	6	6

=== Top half ===
==== Section 1 ====
First round
1	(Croatia) Petra Marčinko	6	6
(Canada) Kayla Cross	1	4
(Kenya) Angella Okutoyi	7^{8}	6
(Belgium) Amelie Van Impe	6^{6}	4
WC	(France) Mathilde Ngijol-Carré	6	7
WC	(Brazil) Olivia Carneiro	3	5
Q	(United States) Sonya Macavei	6	6^{1}	6^{8}
13	(Czech Republic) Nikola Bartůňková	3	7^{7}	7^{10}
12	(Slovakia) Nikola Daubnerová	6	7
(Japan) Sayaka Ishii	4	5
(Czech Republic) Linda Klimovičová	5	6	2
(Argentina) Luciana Moyano	7	3	6
(Australia) Taylah Preston	7	6
(United States) Mia Slama	5	4
WC	(France) Sarah Iliev	2	6	6
8	Ksenia Zaytseva	6	4	4

Second round
1	(Croatia) P Marčinko	6	6
(Kenya) A Okutoyi	2	4
WC	(France) M Ngijol-Carré	2	2
13	(Czech Republic) N Bartůňková	6	6
12	(Slovakia) N Daubnerová	6	6
(Argentina) L Moyano	0	1
(Australia) T Preston	6	7
WC	(France) S Iliev	3	5

Third round
1	(Croatia) P Marčinko	6^{5}	5
13	(Czech Republic) N Bartůňková	7^{7}	7
12	(Slovakia) N Daubnerová	6	6
(Australia) T Preston	2	0

Quarterfinals
13	(Czech Republic) N Bartůňková	6	6
12	(Slovakia) N Daubnerová	3	0

==== Section 2 ====
First round
4	(Czech Republic) Brenda Fruhvirtová	7	3	4
(Argentina) Solana Sierra	5	6	6
(Belgium) Hanne Vandewinkel	6	6
SE	(United States) Ahmani Guichard	4	1
(Japan) Sara Saito	6	2	2
Q	(Morocco) Aya El Aouni	4	6	6
(Peru) Lucciana Pérez Alarcón	4	4
16	(France) Yaroslava Bartashevich	6	6
11	(Canada) Victoria Mboko	5	6	6
WC	(France) Alice Soulié	7	4	3
(United Kingdom) Ranah Stoiber	6	6
(Turkey) Ayşegül Mert	3	1
(Germany) Carolina Kuhl	7^{8}	1	7^{10}
Q	(Switzerland) Chelsea Fontenel	6^{6}	6	6^{6}
(Czech Republic) Kristýna Tomajková	3	2
6	(United States) Liv Hovde	6	6

Second round
(Argentina) S Sierra	6	6
(Belgium) H Vandewinkel	4	0
Q	(Morocco) A El Aouni	4	0
16	(France) Y Bartashevich	6	6
11	(Canada) V Mboko	6^{2}	6	6
(United Kingdom) RA Stoiber	7^{7}	2	3
(Germany) C Kuhl	3	0
6	(United States) L Hovde	6	6

Third round
(Argentina) S Sierra	6	7
16	(France) Y Bartashevich	2	5
11	(Canada) V Mboko	3	3
6	(United States) L Hovde	6	6

Quarterfinals
(Argentina) S Sierra	6	7
6	(United States) L Hovde	3	5

=== Bottom half ===
==== Section 3 ====
First round
5	Diana Shnaider	6	6
(Croatia) Lucija Ćirić Bagarić	1	4
Q	(Germany) Joëlle Steur	6	1	6
Q	(Japan) Hayu Kinoshita	2	6	1
Q	Alevtina Ibragimova	5	4
(Hungary) Luca Udvardy	7	6
WC	(France) Lucie Pawlak	4	5
9	(Czech Republic) Lucie Havlíčková	6	7
15	(United States) Qavia Lopez	7^{7}	2	3
(Argentina) Lucía Peyre	6^{4}	6	6
Ekaterina Khayrutdinova	4	5
(Denmark) Johanne Svendsen	6	7
WC	(France) Astrid Lew Yan Foon	2	6	6^{5}
(Canada) Annabelle Xu	6	4	7^{10}
(Czech Republic) Tereza Valentová	7^{7}	2	0
3	(Andorra) Victoria Jiménez Kasintseva	6^{4}	6	6

Second round
5	D Shnaider	3	4
Q	(Germany) J Steur	6	6
(Hungary) L Udvardy	7	2	5
9	(Czech Republic) L Havlíčková	5	6	7
(Argentina) L Peyre	2	3
(Denmark) J Svendsen	6	6
(Canada) A Xu	6	6
3	(Andorra) V Jiménez Kasintseva	2	4

Third round
Q	(Germany) J Steur	6	0	6^{5}
9	(Czech Republic) L Havlíčková	3	6	7^{10}
(Denmark) J Svendsen	3	3
(Canada) A Xu	6	6

Quarterfinals
9	(Czech Republic) L Havlíčková	7^{7}	4	6
(Canada) A Xu	6^{5}	6	1

==== Section 4 ====
First round
7	(Switzerland) Céline Naef	6^{2}	6	6
(Germany) Ella Seidel	7^{7}	1	1
(Australia) Charlotte Kempenaers-Pocz	7	3	0^{r}
(Bulgaria) Denislava Glushkova	5	6	0
WC	(France) Tiantsoa Sarah Rakotomanga Rajaonah	3	6	7^{10}
(United States) Alexis Blokhina	6	3	6^{5}
(Greece) Michaela Laki	5	3
10	(Czech Republic) Sára Bejlek	7	6
14	Mirra Andreeva	6	6
(Canada) Mia Kupres	1	0
Q	(Czech Republic) Julie Štruplová	6	4	4
WC	(France) Jenny Lim	3	6	6
(Slovakia) Nina Vargová	7	6
Q	(United States) Kaitlin Quevedo	5	3
(Czech Republic) Dominika Šalková	6^{5}	6	6
2	(Belgium) Sofia Costoulas	7^{7}	1	3

Second round
7	(Switzerland) C Naef	6	4	7
(Bulgaria) D Glushkova	1	6	5
WC	(France) TS Rakotomanga Rajaonah	2	2
10	(Czech Republic) S Bejlek	6	6
14	M Andreeva	6	6
WC	(France) J Lim	4	0
(Slovakia) N Vargová	6	3	4
(Czech Republic) D Šalková	3	6	6

Third round
7	(Switzerland) C Naef	3	2
10	(Czech Republic) S Bejlek	6	6
14	M Andreeva	6	6
(Czech Republic) D Šalková	0	1

Quarterfinals
10	(Czech Republic) S Bejlek	6	6
14	M Andreeva	4	1

== Qualifying ==
=== Seeds ===
1. (Ukraine) Anastasiya Lopata (qualifying competition)
2. Anastasiia Gureva (first round)
3. (Germany) Joëlle Steur (qualified)
4. (Czech Republic) Julie Štruplová (qualified)
5. (Italy) Georgia Pedone (qualifying competition)
6. (Japan) Hayu Kinoshita (qualified)
7. (Spain) Raquel González Vilar (qualifying competition)
8. (United States) Sonya Macavei (qualified)
9. Evialina Laskevich (qualifying competition)
10. (Switzerland) Chelsea Fontenel (qualified)
11. (Serbia) Tijana Sretenović (first round, retired)
12. (Iran) Meshkatolzahra Safi (first round)
13. (United Kingdom) Ella McDonald (first round)
14. (Morocco) Aya El Aouni (qualified)
15. Alevtina Ibragimova (qualified)
16. (Kazakhstan) Aruzhan Sagandikova (qualifying competition)

=== Qualifiers ===
1. (United States) Kaitlin Quevedo
2. (Morocco) Aya El Aouni
3. (Germany) Joëlle Steur
4. (Czech Republic) Julie Štruplová
5. Alevtina Ibragimova
6. (Japan) Hayu Kinoshita
7. (Switzerland) Chelsea Fontenel
8. (United States) Sonya Macavei

=== Draw ===
==== First qualifier ====
First round
1	(Ukraine) Anastasiya Lopata	6	6
WC	(France) Margot Phanthala	0	0
(United States) Kaitlin Quevedo	7^{7}	6
13	(United Kingdom) Ella McDonald	6^{4}	1

Qualifying competition
1	(Ukraine) Anastasiya Lopata	4	2
(United States) Kaitlin Quevedo	6	6

==== Second qualifier ====
First round
2	Anastasiia Gureva	6	6^{3}	[6]
(Netherlands) Isis Louise van den Broek	2	7^{7}	[10]
(Chinese Taipei) Madeleine Jessup	2	2
14	(Morocco) Aya El Aouni	6	6

Qualifying competition
(Netherlands) Isis Louise van den Broek	6^{5}	1
14	(Morocco) Aya El Aouni	7^{7}	6

==== Third qualifier ====
First round
3	(Germany) Joëlle Steur	6	6
(Brazil) Ana Candiotto	2	4
(Japan) Mao Mushika	1	1
9	Evialina Laskevich	6	6

Qualifying competition
3	(Germany) Joëlle Steur	6	6
9	Evialina Laskevich	3	2

==== Fourth qualifier ====
First round
4	(Czech Republic) Julie Štruplová	6	6
WC	(France) Manon Favier	3	0
(Lithuania) Patricija Paukštytė	6	6
12	(Iran) Meshkatolzahra Safi	4	2

Qualifying competition
4	(Czech Republic) Julie Štruplová	6	6
(Lithuania) Patricija Paukštytė	4	3

==== Fifth qualifier ====
First round
5	(Italy) Georgia Pedone	6	6
(Czech Republic) Amélie Šmejkalová	2	1
WC	(Spain) Ariana Geerlings	6	3	[7]
15	Alevtina Ibragimova	3	6	[10]

Qualifying competition
5	(Italy) Georgia Pedone	2	1
15	Alevtina Ibragimova	6	6

==== Sixth qualifier ====
First round
6	(Japan) Hayu Kinoshita	3	6	[10]
(United States) Ava Krug	6	3	[6]
WC	(France) Ophélie Boullay	4	7	[6]
16	(Kazakhstan) Aruzhan Sagandikova	6	5	[10]

Qualifying competition
6	(Japan) Hayu Kinoshita	6	6
16	(Kazakhstan) Aruzhan Sagandikova	3	0

==== Seventh qualifier ====
First round
7	(Spain) Raquel González Vilar	7^{10}	6
WC	(France) Délia Gaillard	6^{8}	2
(Morocco) Malak El Allami	7^{8}	2	[15]
10	(Switzerland) Chelsea Fontenel	6^{6}	6	[17]

Qualifying competition
7	(Spain) Raquel González Vilar	3	6	[7]
10	(Switzerland) Chelsea Fontenel	6	3	[10]

==== Eighth qualifier ====
First round
8	(United States) Sonya Macavei	6	6
(Denmark) Natacha Schou	3	1
WC	(France) Thessy Ntondele Zinga	1	1
11	(Serbia) Tijana Sretenović	6	2^{r}

Qualifying competition
8	(United States) Sonya Macavei	6	7
WC	(France) Thessy Ntondele Zinga	4	5
