= 2022 French Open =

2022 tennis tournament held in Paris, France

- Date: 22 May – 5 June 2022
- Edition: 121
- Category: Grand Slam
- Draw: 128S / 64D / 32X
- Prize money: €43,600,000
- Surface: Clay
- Location: Paris (XVI^{e}), France
- Venue: Roland Garros Stadium

Champions

Men's singles
- (Spain) Rafael Nadal

Women's singles
- (Poland) Iga Świątek

Men's doubles
- (El Salvador) Marcelo Arévalo / (Netherlands) Jean-Julien Rojer

Women's doubles
- (France) Caroline Garcia / (France) Kristina Mladenovic

Mixed doubles
- (Japan) Ena Shibahara / (Netherlands) Wesley Koolhof

Wheelchair men's singles
- (Japan) Shingo Kunieda

Wheelchair women's singles
- (Netherlands) Diede de Groot

Wheelchair quad singles
- (Netherlands) Niels Vink

Wheelchair men's doubles
- (United Kingdom) Alfie Hewett / (United Kingdom) Gordon Reid

Wheelchair women's doubles
- (Netherlands) Diede de Groot / (Netherlands) Aniek van Koot

Wheelchair quad doubles
- (Netherlands) Sam Schröder / (Netherlands) Niels Vink

Boys' singles
- (France) Gabriel Debru

Girls' singles
- (Czech Republic) Lucie Havlíčková

Boys' doubles
- (Lithuania) Edas Butvilas / (Croatia) Mili Poljičak

Girls' doubles
- (Czech Republic) Sára Bejlek / (Czech Republic) Lucie Havlíčková

Men's legends doubles
- (France) Arnaud Clément / (France) Fabrice Santoro

Women's legends doubles
- (Italy) Flavia Pennetta / (Italy) Francesca Schiavone
- French Open

The 2022 French Open was a Grand Slam tennis tournament played on outdoor clay courts. It was held at the Stade Roland Garros in Paris, France, from 22 May to 5 June 2022, comprising singles, doubles and mixed doubles play. Junior and wheelchair tournaments were also played. Novak Djokovic was the defending champion in men's singles, and Barbora Krejčíková was the defending champion in the women's singles. Neither successfully defended their title, with Djokovic losing in the quarterfinals to eventual champion Rafael Nadal, and Krejčíková losing in the first round to Diane Parry.

The event returned to its full spectator capacity, after the last two restricted capacity editions, due to the COVID-19 pandemic. It was the 121st edition of the French Open and the second Grand Slam event of 2022. The main singles draws included 16 qualifiers for men and 16 for women out of 128 players in each draw. It was part of the 2022 ATP Tour and the 2022 WTA Tour. It was also the first edition of the tournament to feature a super tie break in the final set where the player would win first to ten points as rules are now applied in Wimbledon and US Open.

This was the first Grand Slam tournament since the international governing bodies of tennis allowed players from Russia and Belarus to continue to participate in tennis events, but not compete under the name or flags of Russia and Belarus until further notice.

The men's singles title was won for the 14th time by Rafael Nadal, who won his 22nd Grand Slam title. He defeated eighth seed Casper Ruud, who was playing his first grand slam final, in straight sets. In winning the title, Nadal extended his record of most titles per tournament at the French Open, and also extended his all-time men's record of major singles titles to 22. The women's singles title was won by Iga Świątek, which was her second French Open and second grand slam title, having won her first at the 2020 French Open. She defeated 18th seed Coco Gauff, who was also playing her first grand slam final, in straight sets. In winning the title, Świątek became the youngest winner of multiple majors since Maria Sharapova's win at the 2006 US Open.

== Singles players ==
- Men's singles

Champion		Runner-up	
(Spain) Rafael Nadal [5]		(Norway) Casper Ruud [8]	
Semifinals out
(Germany) Alexander Zverev [3]		(Croatia) Marin Čilić [20]	
Quarterfinals out
(Serbia) Novak Djokovic [1]	(Spain) Carlos Alcaraz [6]	(Denmark) Holger Rune	Andrey Rublev [7]
4th round out
(Argentina) Diego Schwartzman [15]	(Canada) Félix Auger-Aliassime [9]	(Spain) Bernabé Zapata Miralles (Q)	Karen Khachanov [21]
(Poland) Hubert Hurkacz [12]	(Greece) Stefanos Tsitsipas [4]	(Italy) Jannik Sinner [11]	Daniil Medvedev [2]
3rd round out
(Slovenia) Aljaž Bedene (PR)	(Bulgaria) Grigor Dimitrov [18]	(Serbia) Filip Krajinović	(Netherlands) Botic van de Zandschulp [26]
(United States) Brandon Nakashima	(United States) John Isner [23]	(United Kingdom) Cameron Norrie [10]	(United States) Sebastian Korda [27]
(Italy) Lorenzo Sonego [32]	(Belgium) David Goffin	(France) Hugo Gaston	(Sweden) Mikael Ymer
(Chile) Cristian Garín	(United States) Mackenzie McDonald	(France) Gilles Simon (WC)	(Serbia) Miomir Kecmanović [28]
2nd round out
(Slovakia) Alex Molčan	(Uruguay) Pablo Cuevas	(Croatia) Borna Ćorić (PR)	(Spain) Jaume Munar
(Argentina) Camilo Ugo Carabelli (Q)	(Croatia) Borna Gojo (Q)	(Italy) Fabio Fognini	(France) Corentin Moutet (WC)
(Argentina) Sebastián Báez	(Netherlands) Tallon Griekspoor	(France) Grégoire Barrère (WC)	(United States) Taylor Fritz [13]
(Australia) Jason Kubler (Q)	(Bolivia) Hugo Dellien	(France) Richard Gasquet	(Spain) Albert Ramos Viñolas
(Finland) Emil Ruusuvuori	(Portugal) João Sousa	(United States) Frances Tiafoe [24]	(Italy) Marco Cecchinato
(Switzerland) Henri Laaksonen	(Argentina) Pedro Cachín (LL)	(United Kingdom) Dan Evans [29]	(Czech Republic) Zdeněk Kolář (Q)
(Argentina) Federico Delbonis	Ilya Ivashka	(Georgia (country)) Nikoloz Basilashvili [22]	(Spain) Roberto Carballés Baena
(United States) Steve Johnson	(Hungary) Márton Fucsovics	(Kazakhstan) Alexander Bublik	(Serbia) Laslo Đere
1st round out
(Japan) Yoshihito Nishioka	(Argentina) Federico Coria	(Australia) Christopher O'Connell (WC)	(United States) Jenson Brooksby [31]
(United States) Marcos Giron	(Spain) Carlos Taberner	(Germany) Daniel Altmaier	Andrey Kuznetsov (Q)
(Peru) Juan Pablo Varillas (Q)	Aslan Karatsev	(Italy) Alessandro Giannessi (LL)	(United States) Reilly Opelka [17]
Pavel Kotov (Q)	(Australia) Alexei Popyrin	(Switzerland) Stan Wawrinka (PR)	(Australia) Jordan Thompson
(Austria) Sebastian Ofner (Q)	(Serbia) Dušan Lajović	(Poland) Kamil Majchrzak	(Spain) Alejandro Davidovich Fokina [25]
(France) Quentin Halys	(Japan) Taro Daniel	(United States) Michael Mmoh (WC)	(Argentina) Santiago Rodríguez Taverna (Q)
(France) Manuel Guinard (WC)	(United States) Denis Kudla	(Austria) Dominic Thiem	(Portugal) Nuno Borges (Q)
(Australia) John Millman	(South Africa) Lloyd Harris	(Australia) Thanasi Kokkinakis	(Argentina) Juan Ignacio Londero (LL)
(France) Jo-Wilfried Tsonga (WC)	(France) Ugo Humbert	(Chinese Taipei) Tseng Chun-hsin (Q)	(Germany) Peter Gojowczyk
(France) Benjamin Bonzi	(Czech Republic) Jiří Lehečka	(Spain) Pablo Andújar	(Italy) Giulio Zeppieri (Q)
(Canada) Denis Shapovalov [14]	(Spain) Pedro Martínez	(Slovakia) Norbert Gombos (Q)	(Australia) Alex de Minaur [19]
(Argentina) Francisco Cerúndolo	(Australia) James Duckworth	(France) Lucas Pouille (WC)	(Italy) Lorenzo Musetti
(South Korea) Kwon Soon-woo	(France) Adrian Mannarino	(France) Benoît Paire	(United States) Tommy Paul [30]
(United States) Maxime Cressy	(Italy) Franco Agamenone (LL)	(Germany) Oscar Otte	(United States) Bjorn Fratangelo (Q)
(Spain) Pablo Carreño Busta [16]	(Czech Republic) Jiří Veselý	(France) Geoffrey Blancaneaux (Q)	(Hungary) Attila Balázs (PR)
(Argentina) Tomás Martín Etcheverry	(France) Arthur Rinderknech	(Lithuania) Ričardas Berankis	(Argentina) Facundo Bagnis

- Women's singles

Champion		Runner-up	
(Poland) Iga Świątek [1]		(United States) Coco Gauff [18]	
Semifinals out
Daria Kasatkina [20]		(Italy) Martina Trevisan	
Quarterfinals out
(United States) Jessica Pegula [11]	Veronika Kudermetova [29]	(Canada) Leylah Fernandez [17]	(United States) Sloane Stephens
4th round out
(China) Zheng Qinwen	(Romania) Irina-Camelia Begu	(United States) Madison Keys [22]	(Italy) Camila Giorgi [28]
Aliaksandra Sasnovich	(United States) Amanda Anisimova [27]	(Belgium) Elise Mertens [31]	(Switzerland) Jil Teichmann [23]
3rd round out
(Montenegro) Danka Kovinić	(France) Alizé Cornet	(Slovenia) Tamara Zidanšek [24]	(France) Léolia Jeanjean (WC)
(Spain) Paula Badosa [3]	(Kazakhstan) Elena Rybakina [16]	(United States) Shelby Rogers	Aryna Sabalenka [7]
(Australia) Daria Saville (WC)	(Germany) Angelique Kerber [21]	(Switzerland) Belinda Bencic [14]	(Czech Republic) Karolína Muchová
Varvara Gracheva	(Estonia) Kaia Kanepi	Victoria Azarenka [15]	(France) Diane Parry
2nd round out
(United States) Alison Riske	(Slovakia) Anna Karolína Schmiedlová	(Romania) Simona Halep [19]	(Latvia) Jeļena Ostapenko [13]
(Ukraine) Anhelina Kalinina	(Egypt) Mayar Sherif	Ekaterina Alexandrova [30]	(Czech Republic) Karolína Plíšková [8]
(Slovenia) Kaja Juvan	(Serbia) Aleksandra Krunić (Q)	(France) Caroline Garcia	(United States) Katie Volynets (WC)
(United States) Danielle Collins [9]	(Mexico) Fernanda Contreras Gómez (Q)	(Kazakhstan) Yulia Putintseva	(United States) Madison Brengle
(Poland) Magda Linette	(Czech Republic) Petra Kvitová [32]	(France) Elsa Jacquemot (WC)	(United Kingdom) Emma Raducanu [12]
(Canada) Bianca Andreescu (PR)	(Czech Republic) Kateřina Siniaková	(Croatia) Donna Vekić (Q)	(Greece) Maria Sakkari [4]
(Australia) Ajla Tomljanović	(Czech Republic) Marie Bouzková	(Belgium) Alison Van Uytvanck	(Brazil) Beatriz Haddad Maia
(Germany) Andrea Petkovic	(Serbia) Olga Danilović (Q)	(Romania) Sorana Cîrstea [26]	(Colombia) Camila Osorio
1st round out
(Ukraine) Lesia Tsurenko (Q)	(Ukraine) Dayana Yastremska	(Slovakia) Kristína Kučová	Liudmila Samsonova [25]
(Germany) Nastasja Schunk (LL)	(Belgium) Maryna Zanevska	(Japan) Misaki Doi	(Italy) Lucia Bronzetti
(China) Wang Qiang	(United States) Hailey Baptiste (Q)	(Ukraine) Marta Kostyuk	(United States) Claire Liu
(Belgium) Greet Minnen	(Italy) Jasmine Paolini	(Spain) Nuria Párrizas Díaz	(France) Tessah Andrianjafitrimo (WC)
(France) Fiona Ferro (WC)	Oksana Selekhmeteva (Q)	Kamilla Rakhimova	(China) Zhu Lin (Q)
Anna Kalinskaya	(United States) Taylor Townsend (PR)	(Switzerland) Viktorija Golubic	(Netherlands) Arantxa Rus
(Bulgaria) Viktoriya Tomova (LL)	(Czech Republic) Tereza Martincová	(Hungary) Panna Udvardy	(Slovakia) Rebecca Šramková (LL)
(China) Zhang Shuai	(Romania) Irina Bara (Q)	(Romania) Mihaela Buzărnescu (LL)	(France) Chloé Paquet
(Tunisia) Ons Jabeur [6]	(United Kingdom) Harriet Dart	(Greece) Valentini Grammatikopoulou (Q)	(Hungary) Anna Bondár
(Poland) Magdalena Fręch	(United Kingdom) Heather Watson	(China) Wang Xinyu	(Czech Republic) Linda Nosková (Q)
(Hungary) Réka Luca Jani (LL)	(Belgium) Ysaline Bonaventure (Q)	(Croatia) Petra Martić	(France) Kristina Mladenovic
(Japan) Naomi Osaka	(Sweden) Mirjam Björklund (Q)	(France) Carole Monnet (WC)	(France) Clara Burel
(Estonia) Anett Kontaveit [5]	(Australia) Astra Sharma	Anastasia Gasanova (LL)	(Romania) Elena-Gabriela Ruse
(Canada) Rebecca Marino (Q)	(United States) Ann Li	(Spain) Cristina Bucșa (Q)	(Spain) Garbiñe Muguruza [10]
(Romania) Ana Bogdan	(France) Océane Dodin	(Hungary) Dalma Gálfi	(United States) Bernarda Pera
(Germany) Tatjana Maria (PR)	(Germany) Jule Niemeier (Q)	(France) Harmony Tan (WC)	(Czech Republic) Barbora Krejčíková [2]

== Events ==
=== Men's singles ===
- (Spain) Rafael Nadal def. (Norway) Casper Ruud, 6–3, 6–3, 6–0

=== Women's singles ===
- (Poland) Iga Świątek def. (United States) Coco Gauff, 6–1, 6–3

=== Men's doubles ===
- (El Salvador) Marcelo Arévalo / (Netherlands) Jean-Julien Rojer def. (Croatia) Ivan Dodig / (United States) Austin Krajicek, 6–7^{(4–7)}, 7–6^{(7–5)}, 6–3

=== Women's doubles ===
- (France) Caroline Garcia / (France) Kristina Mladenovic def. (United States) Coco Gauff / (United States) Jessica Pegula 2–6, 6–3, 6–2

=== Mixed doubles ===
- (Japan) Ena Shibahara / (Netherlands) Wesley Koolhof def. (Norway) Ulrikke Eikeri / (Belgium) Joran Vliegen, 7–6^{(7–5)}, 6–2

=== Wheelchair men's singles ===
- (Japan) Shingo Kunieda def. (Argentina) Gustavo Fernández, 6–2, 5–7, 7–5

=== Wheelchair women's singles ===
- (Netherlands) Diede de Groot def. (Japan) Yui Kamiji, 6–4, 6–1

=== Wheelchair quad singles ===
- (Netherlands) Niels Vink def. (Netherlands) Sam Schröder, 6–4, 7–6^{(10–8)}

=== Wheelchair men's doubles ===
- (United Kingdom) Alfie Hewett / (United Kingdom) Gordon Reid def. (Argentina) Gustavo Fernández / (Japan) Shingo Kunieda, 7–6^{(7–5)}, 7–6^{(7–5)}

=== Wheelchair women's doubles ===
- (Netherlands) Diede de Groot / (Netherlands) Aniek van Koot def. (Japan) Yui Kamiji / (South Africa) Kgothatso Montjane, 7–6^{(7–5)}, 1–6, [10–8]

=== Wheelchair quad doubles ===
- (Netherlands) Sam Schröder / (Netherlands) Niels Vink def. (Australia) Heath Davidson / (Brazil) Ymanitu Silva, 6–2, 6–2

=== Boys' singles ===
- (France) Gabriel Debru def. (Belgium) Gilles-Arnaud Bailly, 7–6^{(7–5)}, 6–3

=== Girls' singles ===
- (Czech Republic) Lucie Havlíčková def. (Argentina) Solana Sierra, 6–3, 6–3

=== Boys' doubles ===
- (Lithuania) Edas Butvilas / (Croatia) Mili Poljičak def. (Peru) Gonzalo Bueno / (Peru) Ignacio Buse, 6–4, 6–0

=== Girls' doubles ===
- (Czech Republic) Sára Bejlek / (Czech Republic) Lucie Havlíčková def. (Czech Republic) Nikola Bartůňková / (Switzerland) Céline Naef, 6–3, 6–3

=== Men's legends doubles ===
- (France) Arnaud Clément / (France) Fabrice Santoro def. (France) Sébastien Grosjean / (France) Cédric Pioline, 6–3, 4–6, [10–7]

=== Women's legends doubles ===
- (Italy) Flavia Pennetta / (Italy) Francesca Schiavone def. (Argentina) Gisela Dulko / (Argentina) Gabriela Sabatini, 1–6, 7–6^{(7–4)}, [10–6]

== Point distribution and prize money ==
=== Point distribution ===
As a Grand Slam tournament, the points for the French Open are the highest of all ATP and WTA tournaments. These points determine the world ATP and WTA rankings for men's and women's competition, respectively. In both singles and doubles, women received slightly higher point totals compared to their male counterparts at each round of the tournament, except for the first and last. Points and rankings for the wheelchair events fall under the jurisdiction of the ITF Wheelchair Tennis Tour, which also places Grand Slams as the highest classification.

Below is a series of tables for each of the competitions showing the ranking points on offer for each event:

Senior events

Event	Winner	Finalist	Semifinals	Quarterfinals	Round of 16	Round of 32	Round of 64	Round of 128
Men's singles	2000	1200	720	360	180	90	45	10
Men's doubles	2000	1200	720	360	180	90	0	—
Women's singles	2000	1300	780	430	240	130	70	10
Women's doubles	2000	1300	780	430	240	130	10	—

Wheelchair Events

Event	Winner	Finalist	Semifinals	Quarterfinals
Singles	800	500	375	100
Quad singles	800	500	375 / 100	–
Doubles	800	500	100	—
Quad doubles	800	100	—	—

=== Prize money ===
Event	Winner	Finalist	Semifinals	Quarterfinals	Round of 16	Round of 32	Round of 64	Round of 128
Singles	€2,200,000	€1,100,000	€600,000	€380,000	€220,000	€125,800	€86,000	€62,000
Doubles (per team)	€580,000	€290,000	€146,000	€79,500	€42,000	€25,000	€15,500	—N/a

Preceded by 2021 French Open	French Open	Succeeded by 2023 French Open
Preceded by 2022 Australian Open	Grand Slam events	Succeeded by 2022 Wimbledon Championships
