= 2026 Australian Open – Day-by-day summaries =

The 2026 Australian Open described in detail, in the form of day-by-day summaries.

All dates are AEDT (UTC+11)

== Day 1 (18 January) ==
- Seeds out:
  - Men's singles: (Italy) Flavio Cobolli [20]
  - Women's singles: Ekaterina Alexandrova [11], (Ukraine) Marta Kostyuk [20], (Ukraine) Dayana Yastremska [26]
- Schedule of Play

Matches on Main Courts
Matches on Rod Laver Arena
Event	Winner	Loser	Score
Women's singles 1st Round	(Italy) Jasmine Paolini [7]	Aliaksandra Sasnovich [Q]	6–1, 6–2
Men's singles 1st Round	(Germany) Alexander Zverev [3]	(Canada) Gabriel Diallo	6–7^{(1–7)}, 6–1, 6–4, 6–2
Women's singles 1st Round	Aryna Sabalenka [1]	(France) Tiantsoa Rakotomanga Rajaonah [WC]	6–4, 6–1
Men's singles 1st Round	(Spain) Carlos Alcaraz [1]	(Australia) Adam Walton	6–3, 7–6^{(7–2)}, 6–2
Matches on Margaret Court Arena
Event	Winner	Loser	Score
Women's singles 1st Round	(Greece) Maria Sakkari	(France) Léolia Jeanjean	6–4, 6–2
Men's singles 1st Round	(Argentina) Francisco Cerúndolo [18]	(China) Zhang Zhizhen [PR]	6–3, 7–6^{(7–0)}, 6–3
Men's singles 1st Round	(Kazakhstan) Alexander Bublik [10]	(United States) Jenson Brooksby	6–4, 6–4, 6–4
Women's singles 1st Round	(United Kingdom) Emma Raducanu [28]	(Thailand) Mananchaya Sawangkaew [PR]	6–4, 6–1
Matches on John Cain Arena
Event	Winner	Loser	Score
Men's singles 1st Round	(United Kingdom) Arthur Fery [Q]	(Italy) Flavio Cobolli [20]	7–6^{(7–1)}, 6–4, 6–1
Women's singles 1st Round	(Ukraine) Elina Svitolina [12]	(Spain) Cristina Bucșa	6–4, 6–1
Men's singles 1st Round	(United States) Frances Tiafoe [29]	(Australia) Jason Kubler [Q]	7–6^{(7–4)}, 6–3, 6–2
Women's singles 1st Round	(Serbia) Olga Danilović	(United States) Venus Williams [WC]	6–7^{(5–7)}, 6–3, 6–4
Matches on Kia Arena
Event	Winner	Loser	Score
Women's singles 1st Round	(Australia) Talia Gibson [WC]	Anna Blinkova	6–1, 6–3
Men's singles 1st Round	(France) Corentin Moutet [32]	(Australia) Tristan Schoolkate	6–4, 7–6^{(7–1)}, 6–3
Men's singles 1st Round	(United States) Michael Zheng [Q]	(United States) Sebastian Korda	6–4, 6–4, 3–6, 6–7^{(0–7)}, 6–3
Women's singles 1st Round	(China) Bai Zhuoxuan [Q]	Anastasia Pavlyuchenkova	6–4, 2–6, 7–6^{(12–10)}
Matches on 1573 Arena
Event	Winner	Loser	Score
Men's singles 1st Round	(Argentina) Tomás Martín Etcheverry	(Serbia) Miomir Kecmanović	6–2, 3–6, 4–6, 6–3, 6–4
Women's singles 1st Round	(Turkey) Zeynep Sönmez [Q]	Ekaterina Alexandrova [11]	7–5, 4–6, 6–4
Men's singles 1st Round	(United Kingdom) Cameron Norrie [26]	(France) Benjamin Bonzi	6–0, 6–7^{(2–7)}, 4–6, 6–3, 6–4
Matches on ANZ Arena
Event	Winner	Loser	Score
Women's singles 1st Round	(Romania) Elena-Gabriela Ruse	(Ukraine) Dayana Yastremska [26]	6–4, 7–5
Women's singles 1st Round	(France) Elsa Jacquemot	(Ukraine) Marta Kostyuk [20]	6–7^{(4–7)}, 7–6^{(7–4)}, 7–6^{(10–7)}
Men's singles 1st Round	(Hungary) Márton Fucsovics	(Argentina) Camilo Ugo Carabelli	7–6^{(7–5)}, 6–1, 6–2
Women's singles 1st Round	(Austria) Anastasia Potapova	(Netherlands) Suzan Lamens	3–6, 7–5, 6–2
Coloured background indicates a night match
Day matches began at 11 am (11:30 am on Rod Laver Arena and Margaret Court Arena), whilst Night matches began at 7 pm (5 pm on John Cain Arena) AEDT

== Day 2 (19 January) ==
- Seeds out:
  - Men's singles: (Canada) Félix Auger-Aliassime [7], (Czech Republic) Jiří Lehečka [17], (France) Arthur Rinderknech [24], (United States) Brandon Nakashima [27]
  - Women's singles: (United States) Emma Navarro [15], (United States) Sofia Kenin [27]
- Schedule of Play

Matches on Main Courts
Matches on Rod Laver Arena
Event	Winner	Loser	Score
Women's singles 1st Round	(United States) Coco Gauff [3]	(Uzbekistan) Kamilla Rakhimova	6–2, 6–3
Men's singles 1st Round	(Australia) Alex de Minaur [6]	(United States) Mackenzie McDonald [LL]	6–2, 6–2, 6–3
Women's singles 1st Round	(Poland) Iga Świątek [2]	(China) Yuan Yue [Q]	7–6^{(7–5)}, 6–3
Men's singles 1st Round	(Serbia) Novak Djokovic [4]	(Spain) Pedro Martínez	6–3, 6–2, 6–2
Matches on Margaret Court Arena
Event	Winner	Loser	Score
Men's singles 1st Round	Daniil Medvedev [11]	(Netherlands) Jesper de Jong	7–5, 6–2, 7–6^{(7–2)}
Women's singles 1st Round	(United States) Amanda Anisimova [4]	(Switzerland) Simona Waltert	6–3, 6–2
Women's singles 1st Round	Mirra Andreeva [8]	(Croatia) Donna Vekić	4–6, 6–3, 6–0
Men's singles 1st Round	(Norway) Casper Ruud [12]	(Italy) Mattia Bellucci	6–1, 6–2, 6–4
Matches on John Cain Arena
Event	Winner	Loser	Score
Men's singles 1st Round	(Portugal) Nuno Borges	(Canada) Félix Auger-Aliassime [7]	3–6, 6–4, 6–4, 0–0, retired
Women's singles 1st Round	(United States) Jessica Pegula [6]	Anastasia Zakharova	6–2, 6–1
Women's singles 1st Round	(Australia) Ajla Tomljanović	(Ukraine) Yuliia Starodubtseva [Q]	4–6, 7–6^{(7–3)}, 6–1
Men's singles 1st Round	(France) Alexandre Müller	(Australia) Alexei Popyrin	2–6, 6–3, 3–6, 7–6^{(7–5)}, 7–6^{(10–4)}
Matches on Kia Arena
Event	Winner	Loser	Score
Women's singles 1st Round	(Australia) Storm Hunter [Q]	(Spain) Jéssica Bouzas Maneiro	6–4, 6–4
Men's singles 1st Round	Andrey Rublev [13]	(Italy) Matteo Arnaldi	6–4, 6–2, 6–3
Men's singles 1st Round	(Switzerland) Stan Wawrinka [WC]	(Serbia) Laslo Djere	5–7, 6–3, 6–4, 7–6^{(7–4)}
Women's singles 1st Round	Diana Shnaider [23]	(Czech Republic) Barbora Krejčíková	2–6, 6–3, 6–3
Matches on 1573 Arena
Event	Winner	Loser	Score
Women's singles 1st Round	(Poland) Magda Linette	(United States) Emma Navarro [15]	3–6, 6–3, 6–3
Men's singles 1st Round	(Australia) Jordan Thompson [WC]	(Argentina) Juan Manuel Cerúndolo	6–7^{(3–7)}, 7–5, 6–1, 6–1
Women's singles 1st Round	(Canada) Victoria Mboko [17]	(Australia) Emerson Jones [WC]	6–4, 6–1
Men's singles 1st Round	(France) Arthur Géa [Q]	(Czech Republic) Jiří Lehečka [17]	7–5, 7–6^{(7–1)}, 7–5
Matches on ANZ Arena
Event	Winner	Loser	Score
Women's singles 1st Round	(United States) Peyton Stearns	(United States) Sofia Kenin [27]	6–3, 6–2
Women's singles 1st Round	(Australia) Priscilla Hon [WC]	(Canada) Marina Stakusic [Q]	1–6, 6–4, 5–3, retired
Men's singles 1st Round	(Argentina) Thiago Agustín Tirante	(Australia) Aleksandar Vukic	7–5, 6–2, 6–2
Men's singles 1st Round	(Canada) Denis Shapovalov [21]	(China) Bu Yunchaokete [WC]	6–3, 7–6^{(7–3)}, 6–1
Women's singles 1st Round (Note: This match was originally scheduled to be played on Court 7 but was moved to ANZ Arena after the conclusion of Bu-Shapovalov match due to match overruns.)	(Belgium) Elise Mertens [21]	(Thailand) Lanlana Tararudee [Q]	7–5, 6–1
Coloured background indicates a night match
Day matches began at 11 am (11:30 am on Rod Laver Arena and Margaret Court Arena), whilst Night matches began at 7 pm (5 pm on John Cain Arena) AEDT

== Day 3 (20 January) ==
- Seeds out:
  - Men's singles: (Netherlands) Tallon Griekspoor [23], (Brazil) João Fonseca [28]
  - Women's singles: Liudmila Samsonova [18], (Canada) Leylah Fernandez [22], (Australia) Maya Joint [30]
  - Men's doubles: (Monaco) Hugo Nys / (France) Édouard Roger-Vasselin [8]
- Schedule of Play

Matches on Main Courts
Matches on Rod Laver Arena
Event	Winner	Loser	Score
Women's singles 1st Round	(United States) Madison Keys [9]	(Ukraine) Oleksandra Oliynykova	7–6^{(8–6)}, 6–1
Men's singles 1st Round	(United States) Ben Shelton [8]	(France) Ugo Humbert	6–3, 7–6^{(7–2)}, 7–6^{(7–5)}
Men's singles 1st Round	(Italy) Jannik Sinner [2]	(France) Hugo Gaston	6–2, 6–1, 0–0, retired
Women's singles 1st Round	(Japan) Naomi Osaka [16]	(Croatia) Antonia Ružić	6–3, 3–6, 6–4
Matches on Margaret Court Arena
Event	Winner	Loser	Score
Men's singles 1st Round	(Italy) Lorenzo Musetti [5]	(Belgium) Raphaël Collignon	4–6, 7–6^{(7–3)}, 7–5, 3–2, retired
Women's singles 1st Round	(Kazakhstan) Elena Rybakina [5]	(Slovenia) Kaja Juvan	6–4, 6–3
Women's singles 1st Round	(Switzerland) Belinda Bencic [10]	(United Kingdom) Katie Boulter	6–0, 7–5
Men's singles 1st Round	(Greece) Stefanos Tsitsipas [31]	(Japan) Shintaro Mochizuki	4–6, 6–3, 6–2, 6–2
Matches on John Cain Arena
Event	Winner	Loser	Score
Women's singles 1st Round	(Czech Republic) Tereza Valentová	(Australia) Maya Joint [30]	6–4, 6–4
Men's singles 1st Round	Karen Khachanov [15]	(United States) Alex Michelsen	4–6, 6–4, 6–3, 5–7, 6–3
Men's singles 1st Round	(United States) Taylor Fritz [9]	(France) Valentin Royer	7–6^{(7–5)}, 5–7, 6–1, 6–3
Women's singles 1st Round	(Australia) Maddison Inglis [Q]	(Australia) Kimberly Birrell	7–6^{(8–6)}, 6–7^{(9–11)}, 6–4
Matches on Kia Arena
Event	Winner	Loser	Score
Women's singles 1st Round	(Australia) Taylah Preston [WC]	(China) Zhang Shuai	6–3, 2–6, 6–3
Women's singles 1st Round	(Czech Republic) Karolína Plíšková [PR]	(United States) Sloane Stephens [Q]	7–6^{(9–7)}, 6–2
Men's singles 1st Round	(Australia) Dane Sweeny [Q]	(France) Gaël Monfils	6–7^{(3–7)}, 7–5, 6–4, 7–5
Men's singles 1st Round	(Czech Republic) Tomáš Macháč	(Bulgaria) Grigor Dimitrov	6–4, 6–4, 6–3
Women's singles 1st Round (Note: This match was originally scheduled to be played on ANZ Arena but was moved to Kia Arena after the conclusion of Dimitrov-Macháč match due to match overruns in the men's singles matches.)	(Czech Republic) Nikola Bartůňková [Q]	(Australia) Daria Kasatkina	7–6^{(7–9)}, 0–6, 6–3
Matches on 1573 Arena
Event	Winner	Loser	Score
Men's singles 1st Round	(Italy) Luciano Darderi [22]	(Chile) Cristian Garín	7–6^{(7–5)}, 7–5, 7–6^{(7–3)}
Men's singles 1st Round	(United States) Eliot Spizzirri	(Brazil) João Fonseca [28]	6–4, 2–6, 6–1, 6–2
Women's singles 1st Round	(Latvia) Jeļena Ostapenko [24]	(Slovakia) Rebecca Šramková	6–4, 6–4
Women's singles 1st Round	(Germany) Laura Siegemund	Liudmila Samsonova [18]	0–6, 7–5, 6–4
Matches on ANZ Arena
Event	Winner	Loser	Score
Women's singles 1st Round	(Indonesia) Janice Tjen	(Canada) Leylah Fernandez [22]	6–2, 7–6^{(7–1)}
Men's singles 1st Round	(United States) Nishesh Basavareddy [Q]	(Australia) Christopher O'Connell [WC]	4–6, 7–6^{(9–7)}, 6–7^{(3–7)}, 6–2, 6–3
Men's singles 1st Round	(Poland) Hubert Hurkacz	(Belgium) Zizou Bergs	6–7^{(6–8)}, 7–6^{(8–6)}, 6–3, 6–3
Coloured background indicates a night match
Day matches began at 11 am (11:30 am on Rod Laver Arena and Margaret Court Arena), whilst Night matches began at 7 pm (5 pm on John Cain Arena) AEDT

== Day 4 (21 January) ==
- Seeds out:
  - Women's singles: (United Kingdom) Emma Raducanu [28]
  - Men's doubles: (Argentina) Guido Andreozzi / (France) Manuel Guinard [11]
- Schedule of Play

Matches on Main Courts
Matches on Rod Laver Arena
Event	Winner	Loser	Score
Women's singles 2nd Round	Aryna Sabalenka [1]	(China) Bai Zhuoxuan [Q]	6–3, 6–1
Men's singles 2nd Round	(Spain) Carlos Alcaraz [1]	(Germany) Yannick Hanfmann	7–6^{(7–4)}, 6–3, 6–2
Men's singles 2nd Round	(Australia) Alex de Minaur [6]	(Serbia) Hamad Medjedovic	6–7^{(5–7)}, 6–2, 6–2, 6–1
Women's singles 2nd Round	(United States) Iva Jovic [29]	(Australia) Priscilla Hon [WC]	6–1, 6–2
Matches on Margaret Court Arena
Event	Winner	Loser	Score
Men's singles 2nd Round	Andrey Rublev [13]	(Portugal) Jaime Faria [Q]	6–4, 6–3, 4–6, 7–5
Women's singles 2nd Round	(United States) Coco Gauff [3]	(Serbia) Olga Danilović	6–2, 6–2
Women's singles 2nd Round	Mirra Andreeva [8]	(Greece) Maria Sakkari	6–0, 6–4
Men's singles 2nd Round	(United States) Frances Tiafoe [29]	(Argentina) Francisco Comesaña	6–4, 6–3, 4–6, 6–2
Matches on John Cain Arena
Event	Winner	Loser	Score
Women's singles 2nd Round	(Ukraine) Elina Svitolina [12]	(Poland) Linda Klimovičová [Q]	7–5, 6–1
Men's singles 2nd Round	Daniil Medvedev [11]	(France) Quentin Halys	6–7^{(9–11)}, 6–3, 6–4, 6–2
Women's singles 2nd Round	(Romania) Elena-Gabriela Ruse	(Australia) Ajla Tomljanović	6–4, 6–4
Men's singles 2nd Round	(Germany) Alexander Zverev [3]	(France) Alexandre Müller	6–3, 4–6, 6–3, 6–4
Women's singles 2nd Round (Note: This match was originally played at Kia Arena and was suspended with Paolini leading 4–1 in the first set due to rain. It was completed on John Cain Arena following the conclusion of Müller-Zverev match.)	(Italy) Jasmine Paolini [7]	(Poland) Magdalena Fręch	6–2, 6–3
Matches on Kia Arena
Event	Winner	Loser	Score
Women's singles 2nd Round	Diana Shnaider [23]	(Australia) Talia Gibson [WC]	3–6, 7–5, 6–3
Men's singles 2nd Round	(Spain) Alejandro Davidovich Fokina [14]	(United States) Reilly Opelka	6–3, 7–6^{(7–3)}, 5–7, 4–6, 6–4
Men's singles 2nd Round	(Kazakhstan) Alexander Bublik [10]	(Hungary) Márton Fucsovics	7–5, 6–4, 7–5
Matches on 1573 Arena
Event	Winner	Loser	Score
Men's singles 2nd Round	(United States) Tommy Paul [19]	(Argentina) Thiago Agustín Tirante	6–3, 6–4, 6–2
Women's singles 2nd Round	(Canada) Victoria Mboko [17]	(United States) Caty McNally	6–4, 6–3
Men's singles 2nd Round	(Portugal) Nuno Borges	(Australia) Jordan Thompson [WC]	6–7^{(9–11)}, 6–3, 6–2, 6–4
Women's singles 2nd Round	(Czech Republic) Karolína Muchová [19]	(United States) Alycia Parks	4–6, 6–4, 6–4
Matches on ANZ Arena
Event	Winner	Loser	Score
Men's singles 2nd Round	(Argentina) Francisco Cerúndolo [18]	(Bosnia and Herzegovina) Damir Džumhur	6–3, 6–2, 6–1
Women's singles 2nd Round	(United States) Hailey Baptiste	(Australia) Storm Hunter [Q]	6–2, 6–1
Women's singles 2nd Round	(Austria) Anastasia Potapova	(United Kingdom) Emma Raducanu [28]	7–6^{(7–3)}, 6–2
Men's singles 2nd Round	(United States) Learner Tien [25]	(Kazakhstan) Alexander Shevchenko	6–2, 5–7, 6–1, 6–0
Women's singles 2nd Round (Note: This match was originally played at Court 6 and was suspended with Linette leading 5–3 in the first set due to rain. It was completed on ANZ Arena once play resumed hours after the conclusion of Shevchenko-Tien match.)	(Poland) Magda Linette	(United States) Ann Li	6–3, 6–3
Coloured background indicates a night match
Day matches began at 11 am (11:30 am on Rod Laver Arena and Margaret Court Arena), whilst Night matches began at 7 pm (5 pm on John Cain Arena) AEDT

== Day 5 (22 January) ==
- Seeds out:
  - Men's singles: (Canada) Denis Shapovalov [21], (Greece) Stefanos Tsitsipas [31]
  - Women's singles: (Switzerland) Belinda Bencic [10], (Latvia) Jeļena Ostapenko [24], (Spain) Paula Badosa [25]
  - Men's doubles: (Italy) Simone Bolelli / (Italy) Andrea Vavassori [7], (United States) Evan King / (Australia) John Peers [15]
  - Women's doubles: Liudmila Samsonova / Diana Shnaider [10], Irina Khromacheva / Alexandra Panova [11], (Chinese Taipei) Chan Hao-ching / (China) Jiang Xinyu [14]
- Schedule of Play

Matches on Main Courts
Matches on Rod Laver Arena
Event	Winner	Loser	Score
Women's singles 2nd Round	(United States) Jessica Pegula [6]	(United States) McCartney Kessler	6–0, 6–2
Men's singles 2nd Round	(Serbia) Novak Djokovic [4]	(Italy) Francesco Maestrelli [Q]	6–3, 6–2, 6–2
Men's singles 2nd Round	(Italy) Jannik Sinner [2]	(Australia) James Duckworth [WC]	6–1, 6–4, 6–2
Women's singles 2nd Round	(Kazakhstan) Elena Rybakina [5]	(France) Varvara Gracheva	7–5, 6–2
Matches on Margaret Court Arena
Event	Winner	Loser	Score
Men's singles 2nd Round	(Italy) Lorenzo Musetti [5]	(Italy) Lorenzo Sonego	6–3, 6–3, 6–4
Women's singles 2nd Round	(United States) Amanda Anisimova [4]	(Czech Republic) Kateřina Siniaková	6–1, 6–4
Women's singles 2nd Round	(Japan) Naomi Osaka [16]	(Romania) Sorana Cîrstea	6–3, 4–6, 6–2
Men's singles 2nd Round	(Norway) Casper Ruud [12]	(Spain) Jaume Munar	6–3, 7–5, 6–4
Matches on John Cain Arena
Event	Winner	Loser	Score
Women's singles 2nd Round	(United States) Madison Keys [9]	(United States) Ashlyn Krueger	6–1, 7–5
Men's singles 2nd Round	(United States) Ben Shelton [8]	(Australia) Dane Sweeny [Q]	6–3, 6–2, 6–2
Women's doubles 1st Round (Note: This match was originally scheduled to be played on Court 13 but was moved to John Cain Arena after the conclusion of Shelton-Sweeny match due to match overruns.)	(Ukraine) Nadiia Kichenok (Japan) Makoto Ninomiya	(Australia) Emerson Jones [WC] (Australia) Astra Sharma [WC]	6–4, 6–2
Women's singles 2nd Round	(Poland) Iga Świątek [2]	(Czech Republic) Marie Bouzková	6–2, 6–3
Men's singles 2nd Round	(United States) Taylor Fritz [9]	(Czech Republic) Vít Kopřiva	6–1, 6–4, 7–6^{(7–4)}
Matches on Kia Arena
Event	Winner	Loser	Score
Men's singles 2nd Round	(Monaco) Valentin Vacherot [30]	(Australia) Rinky Hijikata [WC]	6–1, 6–3, 4–6, 6–2
Women's singles 2nd Round	(Czech Republic) Linda Nosková [13]	(Australia) Taylah Preston [WC]	6–2, 4–6, 6–2
Men's singles 2nd Round	(Switzerland) Stan Wawrinka [WC]	(France) Arthur Géa [Q]	4–6, 6–3, 3–6, 7–5, 7–6^{(10–3)}
Men's doubles 1st Round	(Australia) Jason Kubler [WC] (Australia) Marc Polmans [WC]	(Australia) Thanasi Kokkinakis [WC] (Australia) Nick Kyrgios [WC]	6–4, 4–6, 7–6^{(10–4)}
Matches on 1573 Arena
Event	Winner	Loser	Score
Women's singles 2nd Round	Oksana Selekhmeteva	(Spain) Paula Badosa [25]	6–4, 6–4
Men's singles 2nd Round	(United States) Ethan Quinn	(Poland) Hubert Hurkacz	6–4, 7–6^{(7–5)}, 6–1
Women's singles 2nd Round	(Belgium) Elise Mertens [21]	(Japan) Moyuka Uchijima	6–3, 6–1
Men's singles 2nd Round	(Croatia) Marin Čilić	(Canada) Denis Shapovalov [21]	6–4, 6–3, 6–2
Matches on ANZ Arena
Event	Winner	Loser	Score
Men's singles 2nd Round	Karen Khachanov [15]	(United States) Nishesh Basavareddy [Q]	6–1, 6–4, 6–3
Women's singles 2nd Round	(Australia) Maddison Inglis [Q]	(Germany) Laura Siegemund	6–4, 6–7^{(3–7)}, 7–6^{(10–7)}
Men's singles 2nd Round	(Czech Republic) Tomáš Macháč	(Greece) Stefanos Tsitsipas [31]	6–4, 3–6, 7–6^{(7–5)}, 7–6^{(7–5)}
Women's singles 2nd Round	(Czech Republic) Nikola Bartůňková [Q]	(Switzerland) Belinda Bencic [10]	6–3, 0–6, 6–4
Coloured background indicates a night match
Day matches began at 11 am (11:30 am on Rod Laver Arena and Margaret Court Arena), whilst Night matches began at 7 pm (5 pm on John Cain Arena) AEDT

== Day 6 (23 January) ==
- Seeds out:
  - Men's singles: Andrey Rublev [13], (Spain) Alejandro Davidovich Fokina [14], (United Kingdom) Cameron Norrie [26], (United States) Frances Tiafoe [29], (France) Corentin Moutet [32]
  - Women's singles: (Italy) Jasmine Paolini [7], (Denmark) Clara Tauson [14], Diana Shnaider [23]
  - Men's doubles: (United Kingdom) Julian Cash / (United Kingdom) Lloyd Glasspool [1], (Germany) Kevin Krawietz / (Germany) Tim Pütz [5], (Portugal) Francisco Cabral / (Austria) Lucas Miedler [9], (Argentina) Máximo González / (Argentina) Andrés Molteni [13]
  - Mixed doubles: (Italy) Sara Errani / (Italy) Andrea Vavassori [1]
- Schedule of Play

Matches on Main Courts
Matches on Rod Laver Arena
Event	Winner	Loser	Score
Women's singles 3rd Round	Aryna Sabalenka [1]	(Austria) Anastasia Potapova	7–6^{(7–4)}, 7–6^{(9–7)}
Men's singles 3rd Round	(Spain) Carlos Alcaraz [1]	(France) Corentin Moutet [32]	6–2, 6–4, 6–1
Men's singles 3rd Round	(Australia) Alex de Minaur [6]	(United States) Frances Tiafoe [29]	6–3, 6–4, 7–5
Women's singles 3rd Round	Mirra Andreeva [8]	(Romania) Elena-Gabriela Ruse	6–3, 6–4
Matches on Margaret Court Arena
Event	Winner	Loser	Score
Men's singles 3rd Round	Daniil Medvedev [11]	(Hungary) Fábián Marozsán	6–7^{(5–7)}, 4–6, 7–5, 6–0, 6–3
Women's singles 3rd Round	(United States) Coco Gauff [3]	(United States) Hailey Baptiste	3–6, 6–0, 6–3
Women's singles 3rd Round	(Ukraine) Elina Svitolina [12]	Diana Shnaider [23]	7–6^{(7–4)}, 6–3
Men's singles 3rd Round	(Kazakhstan) Alexander Bublik [10]	(Argentina) Tomás Martín Etcheverry	7–6^{(7–4)}, 7–6^{(7–5)}, 6–4
Matches on John Cain Arena
Event	Winner	Loser	Score
Women's singles 3rd Round	(Canada) Victoria Mboko [17]	(Denmark) Clara Tauson [14]	7–6^{(7–5)}, 5–7, 6–3
Men's singles 3rd Round	(United States) Tommy Paul [19]	(Spain) Alejandro Davidovich Fokina [14]	6–1, 6–1, 0–0, retired
Women's singles 3rd Round	(United States) Iva Jovic [29]	(Italy) Jasmine Paolini [7]	6–2, 7–6^{(7–3)}
Men's singles 3rd Round	(Germany) Alexander Zverev [3]	(United Kingdom) Cameron Norrie [26]	7–5, 4–6, 6–3, 6–1
Matches on Kia Arena
Event	Winner	Loser	Score
Men's singles 3rd Round	(United States) Learner Tien [25]	(Portugal) Nuno Borges	7–6^{(11–9)}, 6–4, 6–2
Women's singles 3rd Round	(Kazakhstan) Yulia Putintseva	(Turkey) Zeynep Sönmez [Q]	6–3, 6–7^{(3–7)}, 6–3
Women's singles 3rd Round	(Czech Republic) Karolína Muchová [19]	(Poland) Magda Linette	6–1, 6–1
Men's singles 3rd Round	(Argentina) Francisco Cerúndolo [18]	Andrey Rublev [13]	6–3, 7–6^{(7–4)}, 6–3
Matches on 1573 Arena
Event	Winner	Loser	Score
Men's doubles 2nd Round	(United States) Robert Cash [14] (United States) JJ Tracy [14]	(Brazil) Marcelo Demoliner (Netherlands) Jean-Julien Rojer	7–5, 6–2
Women's doubles 2nd Round	(Japan) Ena Shibahara [PR] Vera Zvonareva [PR]	(Australia) Lizette Cabrera [WC] (Australia) Taylah Preston [WC]	6–4, 6–3
Men's doubles 2nd Round	(Netherlands) Tallon Griekspoor (Netherlands) Botic van de Zandschulp	(Australia) Matthew Ebden (United States) Rajeev Ram	6–3, 6–3
Mixed doubles 1st Round	(Brazil) Luisa Stefani [2] (El Salvador) Marcelo Arévalo [2]	(Australia) Taylah Preston [WC] (Australia) Cruz Hewitt [WC]	6–2, 6–3
Matches on ANZ Arena
Event	Winner	Loser	Score
Men's doubles 2nd Round	(Australia) James McCabe [WC] (Australia) Li Tu [WC]	(United Kingdom) Julian Cash [1] (United Kingdom) Lloyd Glasspool [1]	7–6^{(7–5)}, 6–4
Men's doubles 2nd Round	(Czech Republic) Adam Pavlásek (Australia) John-Patrick Smith	(Portugal) Francisco Cabral [9] (Austria) Lucas Miedler [9]	6–4, 6–4
Mixed doubles 1st Round	(Slovakia) Tereza Mihalíková [8] (United Kingdom) Lloyd Glasspool [8]	(Australia) Maddison Inglis [WC] (Australia) Jason Kubler [WC]	6–4, 6–1
Mixed doubles 1st Round	(Czech Republic) Kateřina Siniaková (Netherlands) Sem Verbeek	Alexandra Panova (Netherlands) David Pel	3–6, 6–2, [10–2]
Mixed doubles 1st Round	(Canada) Leylah Fernandez [WC] (Australia) Nick Kyrgios [WC]	(United States) Desirae Krawczyk (United Kingdom) Neal Skupski	6–7^{(6–8)}, 6–4, [12–10]
Coloured background indicates a night match
Day matches began at 11 am (11:30 am on Rod Laver Arena and Margaret Court Arena), whilst Night matches began at 7 pm (5 pm on John Cain Arena) AEDT

== Day 7 (24 January) ==
Due to extreme high temperatures, all matches started early at 10:00 am AEDT.

- Seeds out:
  - Men's singles: Karen Khachanov [15], (Monaco) Valentin Vacherot [30]
  - Women's singles: (Czech Republic) Linda Nosková [13], (Japan) Naomi Osaka [16], (Note: Withdrew hours before her scheduled match) Anna Kalinskaya [31]
  - Women's doubles: (Italy) Sara Errani / (Italy) Jasmine Paolini [2], (Slovakia) Tereza Mihalíková / (United Kingdom) Olivia Nicholls [12]
- Schedule of Play

Matches on Main Courts
Matches on Rod Laver Arena
Event	Winner	Loser	Score
Women's singles 3rd Round	(United States) Madison Keys [9]	(Czech Republic) Karolína Plíšková [PR]	6–3, 6–3
Men's singles 3rd Round	(Italy) Jannik Sinner [2]	(United States) Eliot Spizzirri	4–6, 6–3, 6–4, 6–4
Men's singles 3rd Round	(Serbia) Novak Djokovic [4]	(Netherlands) Botic van de Zandschulp	6–3, 6–4, 7–6^{(7–4)}
Men's doubles 2nd Round (Note: This match was originally scheduled to play on Court 13, but was moved to Rod Laver Arena following Osaka's withdrawal and continuous extreme heat.)	(Australia) Jason Kubler [WC] (Australia) Marc Polmans [WC]	(Switzerland) Jakub Paul (United Kingdom) Marcus Willis	5–7, 7–5, 6–4
Women's singles 3rd Round	(Australia) Maddison Inglis [Q]	(Japan) Naomi Osaka [16]	Walkover
Matches on Margaret Court Arena
Event	Winner	Loser	Score
Women's singles 3rd Round	(United States) Jessica Pegula [6]	Oksana Selekhmeteva	6–3, 6–2
Women's singles 3rd Round	(United States) Amanda Anisimova [4]	(United States) Peyton Stearns	6–1, 6–4
Men's singles 3rd Round	(United States) Ben Shelton [8]	(Monaco) Valentin Vacherot [30]	6–4, 6–4, 7–6^{(7–5)}
Women's singles 3rd Round	(Poland) Iga Świątek [2]	Anna Kalinskaya [31]	6–1, 1–6, 6–1
Men's singles 3rd Round	(Norway) Casper Ruud [12]	(Croatia) Marin Čilić	6–4, 6–4, 3–6, 7–5
Matches on John Cain Arena
Event	Winner	Loser	Score
Men's singles 3rd Round	(Italy) Lorenzo Musetti [5]	(Czech Republic) Tomáš Macháč	5–7, 6–4, 6–2, 5–7, 6–2
Women's singles 3rd Round	(Belgium) Elise Mertens [21]	(Czech Republic) Nikola Bartůňková [Q]	6–0, 6–4
Men's singles 3rd Round	(United States) Taylor Fritz [9]	(Switzerland) Stan Wawrinka [WC]	7–6^{(7–5)}, 2–6, 6–4, 6–4
Women's singles 3rd Round	(Kazakhstan) Elena Rybakina [5]	(Czech Republic) Tereza Valentová	6–2, 6–3
Matches on Kia Arena
Event	Winner	Loser	Score
Men's singles 3rd Round	(Italy) Luciano Darderi [22]	Karen Khachanov [15]	7–6^{(7–5)}, 3–6, 6–3, 6–4
Women's singles 3rd Round	(China) Wang Xinyu	(Czech Republic) Linda Nosková [13]	7–5, 6–4
Men's singles 3rd Round	(Czech Republic) Jakub Menšík [16]	(United States) Ethan Quinn	6–2, 7–6^{(7–5)}, 7–6^{(7–5)}
Matches on 1573 Arena
Event	Winner	Loser	Score
Men's doubles 2nd Round	(Finland) Harri Heliövaara [2] (United Kingdom) Henry Patten [2]	(Austria) Alexander Erler (United States) Robert Galloway	7–6^{(7–5)}, 3–6, 6–3
Men's doubles 2nd Round	(Spain) Marcel Granollers [3] (Argentina) Horacio Zeballos [3]	(France) Corentin Moutet (France) Luca Sanchez	6–1, 6–2
Women's doubles 2nd Round	(United States) Asia Muhammad [6] (New Zealand) Erin Routliffe [6]	(Japan) Shuko Aoyama (Poland) Magda Linette	7–6^{(7–3)}, 4–6, 6–3
Mixed doubles 1st Round	(New Zealand) Erin Routliffe / (Sweden) André Göransson vs. (France) Kristina Mladenovic / (France) Manuel Guinard [PR]		Rescheduled
Matches on ANZ Arena
Event	Winner	Loser	Score
Women's doubles 2nd Round	(China) Guo Hanyu [16] (France) Kristina Mladenovic [16]	Anastasia Pavlyuchenkova (Denmark) Clara Tauson	6–1, 4–6, 6–2
Women's doubles 2nd Round	(Australia) Kimberly Birrell [WC] (Australia) Talia Gibson [WC]	(Italy) Sara Errani [2] (Italy) Jasmine Paolini [2]	3–6, 6–3, 7–6^{(10–8)}
Mixed doubles 1st Round	Irina Khromacheva (United States) Christian Harrison	(Chinese Taipei) Hsieh Su-wei (Poland) Jan Zieliński	6–4, 7–6^{(7–5)}
Mixed doubles 1st Round	(United Kingdom) Olivia Nicholls / (United Kingdom) Henry Patten [7] vs. (Kazakhstan) Anna Danilina / (United States) JJ Tracy		Rescheduled
Mixed doubles 1st Round	(Australia) Talia Gibson / (Australia) Matthew Ebden [WC] vs. (Serbia) Aleksandra Krunić / (Croatia) Mate Pavić [5]		Rescheduled
Coloured background indicates a night match
Day matches began at 10 am (10:30 am on main courts), whilst Night matches began at 7 pm (5 pm on John Cain Arena) AEDT

== Day 8 (25 January) ==
- Seeds out:
  - Men's singles: (Kazakhstan) Alexander Bublik [10], Daniil Medvedev [11], (Czech Republic) Jakub Menšík [16], (Note: Withdrew the day before his scheduled fourth round match) (Argentina) Francisco Cerúndolo [18], (United States) Tommy Paul [19]
  - Women's singles: Mirra Andreeva [8], (Canada) Victoria Mboko [17], (Czech Republic) Karolína Muchová [19]
  - Men's doubles: (United States) Robert Cash / (United States) JJ Tracy [14]
  - Women's doubles: (Australia) Ellen Perez / (Netherlands) Demi Schuurs [8], (Spain) Cristina Bucșa / (United States) Nicole Melichar-Martinez [9], (Japan) Miyu Kato / (Hungary) Fanny Stollár [15]
  - Mixed doubles: (United Kingdom) Olivia Nicholls / (United Kingdom) Henry Patten [7], (Slovakia) Tereza Mihalíková / (United Kingdom) Lloyd Glasspool [8]
- Schedule of Play

Matches on Main Courts
Matches on Rod Laver Arena
Event	Winner	Loser	Score
Women's singles 4th Round	Aryna Sabalenka [1]	(Canada) Victoria Mboko [17]	6–1, 7–6^{(7–1)}
Men's singles 4th Round	(Spain) Carlos Alcaraz [1]	(United States) Tommy Paul [19]	7–6^{(8–6)}, 6–4, 7–5
Men's singles 4th Round	(Australia) Alex de Minaur [6]	(Kazakhstan) Alexander Bublik [10]	6–4, 6–1, 6–1
Women's singles 4th Round	(Ukraine) Elina Svitolina [12]	Mirra Andreeva [8]	6–2, 6–4
Matches on Margaret Court Arena
Event	Winner	Loser	Score
Mixed doubles 2nd Round	(Australia) Olivia Gadecki [WC] (Australia) John Peers [WC]	(Germany) Laura Siegemund (France) Édouard Roger-Vasselin	6–3, 3–6, [10–5]
Women's doubles 3rd Round	(Kazakhstan) Anna Danilina [7] (Serbia) Aleksandra Krunić [7]	(Australia) Storm Hunter (Australia) Maya Joint	7–5, 7–6^{(8–6)}
Women's singles 4th Round	(United States) Coco Gauff [3]	(Czech Republic) Karolína Muchová [19]	6–1, 3–6, 6–3
Men's singles 4th Round	(United States) Learner Tien [25]	Daniil Medvedev [11]	6–4, 6–0, 6–3
Matches on John Cain Arena
Event	Winner	Loser	Score
Men's doubles 3rd Round	(Spain) Marcel Granollers [3] (Argentina) Horacio Zeballos [3]	(United States) Robert Cash [14] (United States) JJ Tracy [14]	6–3, 3–6, 6–3
Women's singles 4th Round	(United States) Iva Jovic [29]	(Kazakhstan) Yulia Putintseva	6–0, 6–1
Men's doubles 3rd Round	(United Kingdom) Luke Johnson (Poland) Jan Zieliński	(Czech Republic) Adam Pavlásek (Australia) John-Patrick Smith	6–3, 6–4
Men's singles 4th Round	(Germany) Alexander Zverev [3]	(Argentina) Francisco Cerúndolo [18]	6–2, 6–4, 6–4
Matches on Kia Arena
Event	Winner	Loser	Score
Men's doubles 3rd Round	(France) Sadio Doumbia [12] (France) Fabien Reboul [12]	(Argentina) Tomás Martín Etcheverry (Argentina) Camilo Ugo Carabelli	7–6^{(9–7)}, 6–7^{(6–8)}, 6–1
Women's doubles 3rd Round	(Czech Republic) Kateřina Siniaková [1] (United States) Taylor Townsend [1]	(Japan) Miyu Kato [15] (Hungary) Fanny Stollár [15]	Walkover
Men's doubles 3rd Round	(United States) Christian Harrison [6] (United Kingdom) Neal Skupski [6]	(Netherlands) Tallon Griekspoor (Netherlands) Botic van de Zandschulp	5–0, retired
Women's doubles 2nd Round	(Belgium) Elise Mertens [4] (China) Zhang Shuai [4]	(United States) Iva Jovic (Canada) Victoria Mboko	7–5, 4–6, 7–6^{(12–10)}
Mixed doubles 2nd Round	(United States) Taylor Townsend [4] (Croatia) Nikola Mektić [4]	(Australia) Storm Hunter (Monaco) Hugo Nys	6–3, 2–6, [10–8]
Matches on 1573 Arena
Event	Winner	Loser	Score
Women's doubles 3rd Round	(Japan) Eri Hozumi (Chinese Taipei) Wu Fang-hsien	(Australia) Ellen Perez [8] (Netherlands) Demi Schuurs [8]	6–2, 6–2
Mixed doubles 1st Round	(France) Kristina Mladenovic [PR] (France) Manuel Guinard [PR]	(New Zealand) Erin Routliffe (Sweden) André Göransson	6–4, 7–5
Mixed doubles 2nd Round	(Brazil) Luisa Stefani [2] (El Salvador) Marcelo Arévalo [2]	(United States) Asia Muhammad (United States) Evan King	6–3, 6–2
Mixed doubles 1st Round	(Kazakhstan) Anna Danilina (United States) JJ Tracy	(United Kingdom) Olivia Nicholls [7] (United Kingdom) Henry Patten [7]	6–2, 6–3
Mixed doubles 1st Round	(Australia) Maya Joint [WC] (Australia) Matthew Romios [WC]	(Canada) Gabriela Dabrowski (United Kingdom) Luke Johnson	6–2, 6–7^{(2–7)}, [10–7]
Matches on ANZ Arena
Event	Winner	Loser	Score
Women's doubles 3rd Round	(Canada) Gabriela Dabrowski [5] (Brazil) Luisa Stefani [5]	(Spain) Cristina Bucșa [9] (United States) Nicole Melichar-Martinez [9]	6–4, 6–3
Boys' singles 1st Round	(Austria) Thilo Behrmann [10]	(Australia) Ymerali Ibraimi [WC]	6–1, 6–4
Girls' singles 1st Round	(Australia) Renee Alame	(United States) Ciara Harding [Q]	6–3, 6–3
Mixed doubles 1st Round	(Serbia) Aleksandra Krunić [5] (Croatia) Mate Pavić [5]	(Australia) Talia Gibson [WC] (Australia) Matthew Ebden [WC]	7–6^{(7–2)}, 0–6, [10–6]
Mixed doubles 2nd Round	Irina Khromacheva (United States) Christian Harrison	(Slovakia) Tereza Mihalíková [8] (United Kingdom) Lloyd Glasspool [8]	4–6, 7–5, [10–7]
Coloured background indicates a night match
Day matches began at 10 am (11:30 am on Rod Laver Arena and Margaret Court Arena), whilst Night matches began at 7 pm AEDT

== Day 9 (26 January) ==
- Seeds out:
  - Men's singles: (United States) Taylor Fritz [9], (Norway) Casper Ruud [12], (Italy) Luciano Darderi [22]
  - Women's singles: (United States) Madison Keys [9], (Belgium) Elise Mertens [21]
  - Men's doubles: (Finland) Harri Heliövaara / (United Kingdom) Henry Patten [2], (India) Yuki Bhambri / (Sweden) André Göransson [10], (United States) Austin Krajicek / (Croatia) Nikola Mektić [16]
  - Women's doubles: (New Zealand) Erin Routliffe / (United States) Asia Muhammad [6], (United States) Sofia Kenin / (Germany) Laura Siegemund [13], (China) Guo Hanyu / (France) Kristina Mladenovic [16]
  - Mixed doubles: (Netherlands) Demi Schuurs / (United Kingdom) Julian Cash [3], (Germany) Tim Pütz / (China) Zhang Shuai [6]
- Schedule of Play

Matches on Main Courts
Matches on Rod Laver Arena
Event	Winner	Loser	Score
Women's singles 4th Round	(United States) Jessica Pegula [6]	(United States) Madison Keys [9]	6–3, 6–4
Men's singles 4th Round	(Italy) Lorenzo Musetti [5]	(United States) Taylor Fritz [9]	6–2, 7–5, 6–4
Women's singles 4th Round	(Poland) Iga Świątek [2]	(Australia) Maddison Inglis [Q]	6–0, 6–3
Men's singles 4th Round	(United States) Ben Shelton [8]	(Norway) Casper Ruud [12]	3–6, 6–4, 6–3, 6–4
Matches on Margaret Court Arena
Event	Winner	Loser	Score
Men's doubles 3rd Round	(Australia) Jason Kubler [WC] (Australia) Marc Polmans [WC]	(Australia) Li Tu [WC] (Australia) James McCabe [WC]	6–4, 6–4
Women's doubles 3rd Round	(Australia) Kimberly Birrell [WC] (Australia) Talia Gibson [WC]	(China) Guo Hanyu [16] (France) Kristina Mladenovic [16]	3–6, 6–4, 6–2
Women's singles 4th Round	(Kazakhstan) Elena Rybakina [5]	(Belgium) Elise Mertens [21]	6–1, 6–3
Men's singles 4th Round	(Italy) Jannik Sinner [2]	(Italy) Luciano Darderi [22]	6–1, 6–3, 7–6^{(7–2)}
Matches on John Cain Arena
Event	Winner	Loser	Score
Women's doubles 3rd Round	(Japan) Ena Shibahara [PR] Vera Zvonareva [PR]	(New Zealand) Erin Routliffe [6] (United States) Asia Muhammad [6]	7–5, 3–6, 6–1
Women's singles 4th Round	(United States) Amanda Anisimova [4]	(China) Wang Xinyu	7–6^{(7–4)}, 6–4
Mixed doubles 2nd Round	(United States) JJ Tracy (Kazakhstan) Anna Danilina	(Canada) Leylah Fernandez [WC] (Australia) Nick Kyrgios [WC]	6–3, 6–1
Mixed doubles 2nd Round	(Serbia) Aleksandra Krunić [5] (Croatia) Mate Pavić [5]	(Australia) Maya Joint [WC] (Australia) Matthew Romios [WC]	6–4, 6–3
Matches on Kia Arena
Event	Winner	Loser	Score
Men's doubles 3rd Round	(Brazil) Orlando Luz (Brazil) Rafael Matos	(India) Yuki Bhambri [10] (Sweden) André Göransson [10]	7–6^{(9–7)}, 6–3
Women's doubles 3rd Round	(Chinese Taipei) Hsieh Su-wei [3] (Latvia) Jeļena Ostapenko [3]	(United States) Sofia Kenin [13] (Germany) Laura Siegemund [13]	6–3, 6–2
Men's doubles 3rd Round	(Czech Republic) Petr Nouza (Czech Republic) Patrik Rikl	(Finland) Harri Heliövaara [2] (United Kingdom) Henry Patten [2]	7–6^{(7–4)}, 7–6^{(8–6)}
Mixed doubles 2nd Round	(France) Kristina Mladenovic [PR] (France) Manuel Guinard [PR]	(Netherlands) Demi Schuurs [3] (United Kingdom) Julian Cash [3]	7–6^{(7–5)}, 5–7, [10–2]
Matches on 1573 Arena
Event	Winner	Loser	Score
Boys' singles 2nd Round	(Hong Kong) Kai Thompson	(Australia) Cooper Kose [WC]	6–4, 6–2
Boys' singles 2nd Round	(Japan) Ryo Tabata [3]	(Italy) Matteo Gribaldo	6–3, 6–2
Boys' doubles 1st Round	(Austria) Thilo Behrmann (France) Aaron Gabet	(Poland) Aleksander Błuś (Spain) Valentín González-Galiño	6–1, 6–3
Girls' doubles 1st Round	(Czech Republic) Alena Kovačková [1] (Czech Republic) Jana Kovačková [1]	(Turkey) Ada Kümrü (China) Lin Yujun	6–2, 6–2
Girls' doubles 1st Round	(Sweden) Iva Marinkovic (United Kingdom) Hollie Smart	Anastasia Lizunova; Ekaterina Tupitsyna	6–3, 6–3
Matches on ANZ Arena
Event	Winner	Loser	Score
Girls' singles 2nd Round	(Czech Republic) Alena Kovačková [1]	(Australia) Tori Russell [WC]	6–3, 6–0
Men's doubles 3rd Round	(El Salvador) Marcelo Arévalo [4] (Croatia) Mate Pavić [4]	(United States) Austin Krajicek [16] (Croatia) Nikola Mektić [16]	7–5, 4–6, 7–6^{(10–7)}
Mixed doubles 2nd Round	(Czech Republic) Kateřina Siniaková (Netherlands) Sem Verbeek	(Germany) Tim Pütz [6] (China) Zhang Shuai [6]	4–6, 6–2, [10–8]
Coloured background indicates a night match
Day matches began at 10 am (11:30 am on Rod Laver Arena and Margaret Court Arena), whilst Night matches began at 7 pm AEDT

== Day 10 (27 January) ==
- Seeds out:
  - Men's singles: (Australia) Alex de Minaur [6], (United States) Learner Tien [25]
  - Women's singles: (United States) Coco Gauff [3], (United States) Iva Jovic [29]
  - Men's doubles: (France) Sadio Doumbia / (France) Fabien Reboul [12]
  - Mixed doubles: (Serbia) Aleksandra Krunić / (Croatia) Mate Pavić [5]
- Schedule of Play

Matches on Main Courts
Matches on Rod Laver Arena
Event	Winner	Loser	Score
Women's singles Quarterfinals	Aryna Sabalenka [1]	(United States) Iva Jovic [29]	6–3, 6–0
Men's singles Quarterfinals	(Germany) Alexander Zverev [3]	(United States) Learner Tien [25]	6–3, 6–7^{(5–7)}, 6–1, 7–6^{(7–3)}
Women's singles Quarterfinals	(Ukraine) Elina Svitolina [12]	(United States) Coco Gauff [3]	6–1, 6–2
Men's singles Quarterfinals	(Spain) Carlos Alcaraz [1]	(Australia) Alex de Minaur [6]	7–5, 6–2, 6–1
Matches on Margaret Court Arena
Event	Winner	Loser	Score
Mixed doubles Quarterfinals	(United States) Taylor Townsend [4] (Croatia) Nikola Mektić [4]	Irina Khromacheva (United States) Christian Harrison	6–4, 6–2
Women's doubles 3rd Round	(China) Zhang Shuai [4] (Belgium) Elise Mertens [4]	(United States) Peyton Stearns (United States) Hailey Baptiste	6–4, 6–3
Mixed doubles Quarterfinals	(El Salvador) Marcelo Arévalo [2] (Brazil) Luisa Stefani [2]	(United States) JJ Tracy (Kazakhstan) Anna Danilina	2–6, 6–4, [10–7]
Mixed doubles Quarterfinals	(Australia) Olivia Gadecki [WC] (Australia) John Peers [WC]	(Serbia) Aleksandra Krunić [5] (Croatia) Mate Pavić [5]	6–1, 7–6^{(8–6)}
Men's doubles Quarterfinals	(Australia) Jason Kubler [WC] (Australia) Marc Polmans [WC]	(France) Sadio Doumbia [12] (France) Fabien Reboul [12]	6–4, 7–6^{(7–3)}
Mixed doubles Quarterfinals	(France) Kristina Mladenovic [PR] (France) Manuel Guinard [PR]	(Czech Republic) Kateřina Siniaková (Netherlands) Sem Verbeek	7–6^{(7–2)}, 3–6, [10–8]
Matches on Kia Arena
Event	Winner	Loser	Score
Women's Legends' doubles	(Slovakia) Daniela Hantuchová (Germany) Angelique Kerber	(Australia) Casey Dellacqua (Australia) Samantha Stosur	6–2, 6–2
Men's Legends' doubles	(Australia) Mark Philippoussis (Australia) Pat Rafter	(Germany) Tommy Haas; Marat Safin	4–6, 6–4, [10–6]
Matches on 1573 Arena
Event	Winner	Loser	Score
Boys' singles 2nd Round	(Brazil) Luís Guto Miguel [2]	(Australia) Daniel Jovanovski	6–4, 7–6^{(7–3)}
Girls' singles 2nd Round	(Ukraine) Antonina Sushkova	(Australia) Ellen Hirschi [WC]	6–2, 2–6, 7–5
Boys' doubles 2nd Round	(Japan) Hyu Kawanishi (Japan) Kanta Watanabe	(France) Yannick Theodor Alexandrescou [1] (Japan) Ryo Tabata [1]	7–6^{(9–7)}, 6–2
Matches on ANZ Arena
Event	Winner	Loser	Score
Boys' singles 2nd Round	(Chinese Taipei) Chen Kuan-shou [11]	(Australia) Jake Dembo	6–2, 6–3
Girls' singles 2nd Round	(China) Shao Yushan [11]	(Australia) Sarah Mildren [WC]	7–6^{(9–7)}, 6–1
Boys' doubles 2nd Round	(Australia) Ymerali Ibraimi [WC] (Australia) Cooper Kose [WC]	(Austria) Thilo Behrmann (France) Aaron Gabet	7–6^{(7–0)}, 6–7^{(4–7)}, [10–5]
Coloured background indicates a night match
Day matches began at 9 am (11:30 am on Rod Laver Arena), whilst Night matches began at 7 pm AEDT

== Day 11 (28 January) ==
- Seeds out:
  - Men's singles: (Italy) Lorenzo Musetti [5], (United States) Ben Shelton [8]
  - Women's singles: (Poland) Iga Świątek [2], (United States) Amanda Anisimova [4]
  - Men's doubles: (El Salvador) Marcelo Arévalo / (Croatia) Mate Pavić [4]
  - Women's doubles: (Czech Republic) Kateřina Siniaková / (United States) Taylor Townsend [1], (Chinese Taipei) Hsieh Su-wei / (Latvia) Jeļena Ostapenko [3]
  - Mixed doubles: (Brazil) Luisa Stefani / (El Salvador) Marcelo Arévalo [2], (United States) Taylor Townsend / (Croatia) Nikola Mektić [4]
- Schedule of Play

Matches on Main Courts
Matches on Rod Laver Arena
Event	Winner	Loser	Score
Women's singles Quarterfinals	(Kazakhstan) Elena Rybakina [5]	(Poland) Iga Świątek [2]	7–5, 6–1
Women's singles Quarterfinals	(United States) Jessica Pegula [6]	(United States) Amanda Anisimova [4]	6–2, 7–6^{(7–1)}
Men's singles Quarterfinals	(Serbia) Novak Djokovic [4]	(Italy) Lorenzo Musetti [5]	4–6, 3–6, 3–1, retired
Men's singles Quarterfinals	(Italy) Jannik Sinner [2]	(United States) Ben Shelton [8]	6–3, 6–4, 6–4
Women's doubles Quarterfinals	(Australia) Kimberly Birrell [WC] (Australia) Talia Gibson [WC]	(Japan) Ena Shibahara [PR] Vera Zvonareva [PR]	6–4, 6–7^{(3–7)}, 7–5
Matches on Margaret Court Arena
Event	Winner	Loser	Score
Men's doubles Quarterfinals	(United States) Christian Harrison [6] (United Kingdom) Neal Skupski [6]	(Czech Republic) Petr Nouza (Czech Republic) Patrik Rikl	6–2, 6–3
Men's doubles Quarterfinals	(United Kingdom) Luke Johnson (Poland) Jan Zieliński	(El Salvador) Marcelo Arévalo [4] (Croatia) Mate Pavić [4]	7–6^{(7–5)}, 6–2
Women's doubles Quarterfinals	(Canada) Gabriela Dabrowski [5] (Brazil) Luisa Stefani [5]	(Chinese Taipei) Hsieh Su-wei [3] (Latvia) Jeļena Ostapenko [3]	6–1, 7–6^{(7–5)}
Mixed doubles Semifinals	(Australia) Olivia Gadecki [WC] (Australia) John Peers [WC]	(United States) Taylor Townsend [4] (Croatia) Nikola Mektić [4]	7–6^{(7–2)}, 2–6, [13–11]
Mixed doubles Semifinals	(France) Kristina Mladenovic [PR] (France) Manuel Guinard [PR]	(Brazil) Luisa Stefani [2] (El Salvador) Marcelo Arévalo [2]	6–2, 3–6, [10–7]
Matches on Kia Arena
Event	Winner	Loser	Score
Wheelchair quad singles 1st Round	(Netherlands) Sam Schröder [2]	(Canada) Robert Shaw	6–1, 6–2
Wheelchair women's singles 1st Round	(Japan) Yui Kamiji [1]	(Netherlands) Jiske Griffioen	6–2, 6–2
Wheelchair men's singles 1st Round	(United Kingdom) Alfie Hewett [1]	(Japan) Takuya Miki	6–2, 6–1
Wheelchair men's singles 1st Round	(Japan) Tokito Oda [2]	(United States) Casey Ratzlaff	6–3, 6–3
Wheelchair quad doubles Quarterfinals	(South Africa) Donald Ramphadi (Australia) Jin Woodman	(Australia) Finn Broadbent (Brazil) Leandro Pena	6–4, 6–2
Wheelchair women's doubles Quarterfinals	(Netherlands) Diede de Groot (Netherlands) Aniek van Koot	(Netherlands) Jiske Griffioen (China) Guo Luoyao	6–1, 6–2
Wheelchair men's doubles Quarterfinals	(Argentina) Gustavo Fernández (Japan) Tokito Oda	(Spain) Martín de la Puente [2] (France) Stéphane Houdet [2]	6–2, 5–7, [10–6]
Matches on 1573 Arena
Event	Winner	Loser	Score
Boys' singles 3rd Round	(Germany) Jamie Mackenzie [5]	(Switzerland) Flynn Thomas [12]	7–5, 6–4
Boys' singles 3rd Round	(Kazakhstan) Zangar Nurlanuly [8]	Savva Rybkin [9]	6–1, 6–4
Men's Legends' doubles	(Australia) Lleyton Hewitt (Australia) Pat Rafter	(Cyprus) Marcos Baghdatis (Germany) Tommy Haas	6–2, 6–3
Girls' singles 3rd Round	Mariia Makarova [13]	(Czech Republic) Alena Kovačková [1]	7–6^{(7–3)}, 7–5
Wheelchair men's doubles Quarterfinals	(United Kingdom) Alfie Hewett (United Kingdom) Gordon Reid	(Netherlands) Tom Egberink (Japan) Takuya Miki	6–0, 6–4
Matches on ANZ Arena
Event	Winner	Loser	Score
Women's doubles Quarterfinals	(Belgium) Elise Mertens [4] (China) Zhang Shuai [4]	(Japan) Eri Hozumi (Chinese Taipei) Wu Fang-hsien	4–6, 6–4, 6–3
Women's doubles Quarterfinals	(Kazakhstan) Anna Danilina [7] (Serbia) Aleksandra Krunić [7]	(Czech Republic) Kateřina Siniaková [1] (United States) Taylor Townsend [1]	6–2, 3–6, 6–0
Men's doubles Quarterfinals	(Spain) Marcel Granollers [3] (Argentina) Horacio Zeballos [3]	(Brazil) Orlando Luz (Brazil) Rafael Matos	6–3, 6–4
Women's Legends' doubles	(Australia) Casey Dellacqua (Australia) Alicia Molik	(Slovakia) Daniela Hantuchová (Germany) Andrea Petkovic	6–3, 7–5
Coloured background indicates a night match
Day matches began at 10 am (11:30 am on Rod Laver Arena), whilst Night matches began at 7 pm AEDT

== Day 12 (29 January) ==
- Seeds out:
  - Women's singles: (United States) Jessica Pegula [6], (Ukraine) Elina Svitolina [12]
  - Men's doubles: (Spain) Marcel Granollers / (Argentina) Horacio Zeballos [3]
  - Women's doubles: (Brazil) Luisa Stefani / (Canada) Gabriela Dabrowski [5]
- Schedule of Play

Matches on Main Courts
Matches on Rod Laver Arena
Event	Winner	Loser	Score
Men's Legends' doubles	(Australia) Lleyton Hewitt (Australia) Mark Philippoussis	(Cyprus) Marcos Baghdatis; Marat Safin	6–4, 6–2
Men's doubles Semifinals	(Australia) Jason Kubler [WC] (Australia) Marc Polmans [WC]	(United Kingdom) Luke Johnson (Poland) Jan Zieliński	6–2, 3–6, 6–3
Women's doubles Semifinals	(Kazakhstan) Anna Danilina [7] (Serbia) Aleksandra Krunić [7]	(Brazil) Luisa Stefani [5] (Canada) Gabriela Dabrowski [5]	7–6^{(7–2)}, 3–6, 6–4
Women's singles Semifinals	Aryna Sabalenka [1]	(Ukraine) Elina Svitolina [12]	6–2, 6–3
Women's singles Semifinals	(Kazakhstan) Elena Rybakina [5]	(United States) Jessica Pegula [6]	6–3, 7–6^{(9–7)}
Matches on Margaret Court Arena
Event	Winner	Loser	Score
Wheelchair men's singles Quarterfinals	(United Kingdom) Alfie Hewett [1]	(United Kingdom) Gordon Reid	6–2, 6–3
Women's Legends' doubles	(Germany) Angelique Kerber (Germany) Andrea Petkovic	(Australia) Alicia Molik (Australia) Samantha Stosur	6–4, 0–6, [10–2]
Men's doubles Semifinals	(United States) Christian Harrison [6] (United Kingdom) Neal Skupski [6]	(Spain) Marcel Granollers [3] (Argentina) Horacio Zeballos [3]	6–3, 7–6^{(9–7)}
Women's doubles Semifinals	(Belgium) Elise Mertens [4] (China) Zhang Shuai [4]	(Japan) Ena Shibahara [PR] Vera Zvonareva [PR]	6–3, 6–2
Matches on Kia Arena
Event	Winner	Loser	Score
Wheelchair quad singles Quarterfinals	(Netherlands) Sam Schröder [2]	(Australia) Jin Woodman	7–5, 6–0
Wheelchair women's singles Quarterfinals	(Netherlands) Diede de Groot	(Netherlands) Aniek van Koot [2]	6–2, 6–2
Wheelchair men's singles Quarterfinals	(Japan) Tokito Oda [2]	(Netherlands) Tom Egberink	6–4, 6–4
Wheelchair quad doubles Semifinals	(Australia) Heath Davidson [2] (United Kingdom) Andy Lapthorne [2]	(South Africa) Donald Ramphadi (Australia) Jin Woodman	4–6, 7–6^{(10–8)}, [10–6]
Wheelchair men's doubles Semifinals	(Argentina) Gustavo Fernández (Japan) Tokito Oda	(United Kingdom) Alfie Hewett (United Kingdom) Gordon Reid	4–6, 6–2, [10–4]
Matches on 1573 Arena
Event	Winner	Loser	Score
Girls' singles 3rd Round	(France) Ksenia Efremova [3]	(Canada) Nadia Lagaev	6–2, 6–1
Boys' singles 3rd Round	(Chinese Taipei) Chen Kuan-shou [11]	(Ukraine) Nikita Bilozertsev [6]	6–1, 6–3
Boys' singles 3rd Round	(Slovenia) Žiga Šeško [7]	(Austria) Thilo Behrmann [10]	6–2, 6–4
Boys' doubles Quarterfinals	(Australia) Ymerali Ibraimi [WC] (Australia) Cooper Kose [WC]	(Colombia) Juan Miguel Bolívar Idárraga (United States) Vihaan Reddy	6–2, 6–4
Girls' doubles Quarterfinals	(Czech Republic) Alena Kovačková [1] (Czech Republic) Jana Kovačková [1]	(United States) Capucine Jauffret (Australia) Tahlia Kokkinis	6–2, 6–2
Matches on ANZ Arena
Event	Winner	Loser	Score
Girls' singles 3rd Round	(China) Shao Yushan [11]	Anna Pushkareva	4–6, 6–3, 6–4
Girls' singles 3rd Round	(China) Sun Xinran [6]	(Czech Republic) Denisa Žoldáková	7–6^{(8–6)}, 6–3
Boys' singles 3rd Round	(Brazil) Luís Guto Miguel [2]	(Botswana) Ntungamili Raguin [Q]	6–4, 6–3
Girls' doubles Quarterfinals	Alexandra Malova; Alisa Terentyeva	(Jamaica) Alyssa James (Poland) Maja Pawelska	2–6, 6–3, [10–5]
Coloured background indicates a night match
Day matches began at 10 am (11:30 am on Rod Laver Arena), whilst Night matches began at 7 pm AEDT

== Day 13 (30 January) ==
- Seeds out:
  - Men's singles: (Italy) Jannik Sinner [2], (Germany) Alexander Zverev [3]
- Schedule of Play

Matches on Main Courts
Matches on Rod Laver Arena
Event	Winner	Loser	Score
Mixed doubles Final	(Australia) Olivia Gadecki [WC] (Australia) John Peers [WC]	(France) Kristina Mladenovic [PR] (France) Manuel Guinard [PR]	4–6, 6–3, [10–8]
Men's singles Semifinals	(Spain) Carlos Alcaraz [1]	(Germany) Alexander Zverev [3]	6–4, 7–6^{(7–5)}, 6–7^{(3–7)}, 6–7^{(4–7)}, 7–5
Men's singles Semifinals	(Serbia) Novak Djokovic [4]	(Italy) Jannik Sinner [2]	3–6, 6–3, 4–6, 6–4, 6–4
Matches on Margaret Court Arena
Event	Winner	Loser	Score
Boys' singles Quarterfinals	(Kazakhstan) Zangar Nurlanuly [8]	(Hong Kong) Kai Thompson	3–6, 7–6^{(7–4)}, 6–4
Girls' singles Quarterfinals	(United States) Thea Frodin [8]	Mariia Makarova [13]	6–3, 6–0
Girls' singles Quarterfinals	(France) Ksenia Efremova [3]	(Japan) Kanon Sawashiro [10]	6–3, 7–5
Girls' doubles Semifinals	(Czech Republic) Alena Kovačková [1] (Czech Republic) Jana Kovačková [1]	Mariia Makarova; Rada Zolotareva	6–4, 6–4
Matches on Kia Arena
Event	Winner	Loser	Score
Wheelchair quad singles Semifinals	(Netherlands) Niels Vink [1]	(Israel) Guy Sasson [3]	6–1, 6–1
Wheelchair women's singles Semiinals	(China) Li Xiaohui [3]	(Japan) Yui Kamiji [1]	3–6, 6–2, 7–6^{(10–8)}
Wheelchair men's singles Semifinals	(Japan) Tokito Oda [2]	(Argentina) Gustavo Fernández [4]	6–1, 7–6^{(7–2)}
Wheelchair quad doubles Final	(Israel) Guy Sasson [1] (Netherlands) Niels Vink [1]	(Australia) Heath Davidson [2] (United Kingdom) Andy Lapthorne [2]	6–3, 6–1
Wheelchair women's doubles Final	(China) Li Xiaohui [1] (China) Wang Ziying [1]	(Japan) Yui Kamiji [2] (China) Zhu Zhenzhen [2]	6–4, 6–3
Wheelchair men's doubles Final	(Argentina) Gustavo Fernández (Japan) Tokito Oda	(Spain) Daniel Caverzaschi [1] (Netherlands) Ruben Spaargaren [1]	6–2, 6–1
Matches on 1573 Arena
Event	Winner	Loser	Score
Boys' singles Quarterfinals	(Japan) Ryo Tabata [3]	(Germany) Jamie Mackenzie [5]	6–7^{(3–7)}, 6–4, 7–6^{(10–7)}
Boys' singles Quarterfinals	(United States) Keaton Hance [4]	(Chinese Taipei) Chen Kuan-shou [11]	7–6^{(9–7)}, 6–4
Boys' singles Quarterfinals	(Slovenia) Žiga Šeško [7]	(Brazil) Luís Guto Miguel [2]	6–2, 7–6^{(7–5)}
Coloured background indicates a night match
Day matches began at 11 am (12 pm on Rod Laver Arena), whilst Night match began at 7:30 pm AEDT

== Day 14 (31 January) ==
- Seeds out:
  - Women's singles: Aryna Sabalenka [1]
  - Women's doubles: (Kazakhstan) Anna Danilina / (Serbia) Aleksandra Krunić [7]
- Schedule of Play

Matches on Main Courts
Matches on Rod Laver Arena
Event	Winner	Loser	Score
Women's doubles Final	(Belgium) Elise Mertens [4] (China) Zhang Shuai [4]	(Kazakhstan) Anna Danilina [7] (Serbia) Aleksandra Krunić [7]	7–6^{(7–4)}, 6–4
Men's doubles Final	(United States) Christian Harrison [6] (United Kingdom) Neal Skupski [6]	(Australia) Jason Kubler [WC] (Australia) Marc Polmans [WC]	7–6^{(7–4)}, 6–4
Women's singles Final	(Kazakhstan) Elena Rybakina [5]	Aryna Sabalenka [1]	6–4, 4–6, 6–4
Matches on Margaret Court Arena
Event	Winner	Loser	Score
Girls' singles Semifinals	(France) Ksenia Efremova [3]	Rada Zolotareva	6–0, 4–6, 6–4
Boys' singles Semifinals	(Slovenia) Žiga Šeško [7]	(Japan) Ryo Tabata [3]	6–3, 6–3
Girls' doubles Final	(Czech Republic) Alena Kovačková [1] (Czech Republic) Jana Kovačková [1]	(Czech Republic) Tereza Heřmanová (Czech Republic) Denisa Žoldáková	6–1, 6–3
Boys' doubles Final	(South Africa) Connor Doig (Bulgaria) Dimitar Kisimov	(Australia) Ymerali Ibraimi [WC] (Australia) Cooper Kose [WC]	6–3, 6–4
Wheelchair men's singles Final	(Japan) Tokito Oda [2]	(Spain) Martín de la Puente [3]	3–6, 6–2, 6–2
Matches on Kia Arena
Event	Winner	Loser	Score
Wheelchair quad singles Final	(Netherlands) Niels Vink [1]	(Netherlands) Sam Schröder [2]	6–3, 7–6^{(7–5)}
Wheelchair women's singles Final	(China) Li Xiaohui [3]	(Netherlands) Diede de Groot	6–1, 6–2
Matches on 1573 Arena
Event	Winner	Loser	Score
Girls' singles Semifinals	Ekaterina Tupitsyna	(United States) Thea Frodin [8]	6–3, 6–4
Boys' singles Semifinals	(United States) Keaton Hance [4]	(Kazakhstan) Zangar Nurlanuly [8]	6–3, 6–2
Coloured background indicates a night match
Day matches began at 12 pm, whilst Night match began at 7:30 pm AEDT

== Day 15 (1 February) ==
- Seeds out:
  - Men's singles: (Serbia) Novak Djokovic [4]
- Schedule of Play

Matches on Main Courts
Matches on Rod Laver Arena
Event	Winner	Loser	Score
Girls' singles Final	(France) Ksenia Efremova [3]	Ekaterina Tupitsyna	6–3, 7–5
Boys' singles Final	(Slovenia) Žiga Šeško [7]	(United States) Keaton Hance [4]	4–6, 6–3, 6–4
Men's singles Final	(Spain) Carlos Alcaraz [1]	(Serbia) Novak Djokovic [4]	2–6, 6–3, 6–4, 7–5
Coloured background indicates a night match
Day matches began at 12 pm, whilst Night match began at 7:30 pm AEDT
