= 2022 Australian Open – Day-by-day summaries =

The 2022 Australian Open described in detail, in the form of day-by-day summaries.

All dates are AEDT (UTC+11)

== Day 1 (17 January) ==
Novak Djokovic was originally scheduled to play the night match on Rod Laver Arena and he was due to compete against fellow Serb Miomir Kecmanović before he was deported. His spot was replaced by lucky loser Salvatore Caruso.

- Seeds out:
  - Men's singles: (United Kingdom) Cameron Norrie [12], (South Africa) Lloyd Harris [30]
  - Women's singles: (United States) Sofia Kenin [11], (United States) Coco Gauff [18]
- Schedule of Play

Matches on main courts
Matches on Rod Laver Arena
Event	Winner	Loser	Score
Women's singles 1st round	(Greece) Maria Sakkari [5]	(Germany) Tatjana Maria [PR]	6–4, 7–6^{(7–2)}
Women's singles 1st round	(Japan) Naomi Osaka [13]	(Colombia) Camila Osorio	6–3, 6–3
Men's singles 1st round	(Spain) Rafael Nadal [6]	(United States) Marcos Giron	6–1, 6–4, 6–2
Women's singles 1st round	(Australia) Ashleigh Barty [1]	(Ukraine) Lesia Tsurenko [Q]	6–0, 6–1
Men's singles 1st round (Note: This match was originally scheduled to play on Margaret Court Arena, but later moved to Rod Laver Arena.)	(Germany) Alexander Zverev [3]	(Germany) Daniel Altmaier	7–6^{(7–3)}, 6–1, 7–6^{(7–1)}
Matches on Margaret Court Arena
Event	Winner	Loser	Score
Women's singles 1st round	(Ukraine) Elina Svitolina [15]	(France) Fiona Ferro	6–1, 7–6^{(7–4)}
Men's singles 1st round	(Italy) Matteo Berrettini [7]	(United States) Brandon Nakashima	4–6, 6–2, 7–6^{(7–5)}, 6–3
Women's singles 1st round	(China) Wang Qiang	(United States) Coco Gauff [18]	6–4, 6–2
Men's singles 1st round (Note: This match was originally scheduled to play on John Cain Arena, but later moved to Margaret Court Arena.)	(Australia) John Millman	(Spain) Feliciano López	6–1, 6–3, 4–6, 7–5
Women's singles 1st round	(Spain) Paula Badosa [8]	(Australia) Ajla Tomljanović	6–4, 6–0
Matches on John Cain Arena
Event	Winner	Loser	Score
Men's singles 1st round	(Canada) Denis Shapovalov [14]	(Serbia) Laslo Đere	7–6^{(7–3)}, 6–4, 3–6, 7–6^{(7–3)}
Men's singles 1st round	(Poland) Hubert Hurkacz [10]	(Belarus) Egor Gerasimov	6–2, 7–6^{(7–3)}, 6–7^{(5–7)}, 6–3
Women's singles 1st round	(United States) Madison Keys	(United States) Sofia Kenin [11]	7–6^{(7–2)}, 7–5
Matches on Kia Arena
Event	Winner	Loser	Score
Women's singles 1st round	(Switzerland) Belinda Bencic [22]	(France) Kristina Mladenovic	6–4, 6–3
Men's singles 1st round	(France) Gaël Monfils [17]	(Argentina) Federico Coria	6–1, 6–1, 6–3
Men's singles 1st round	(United States) Sebastian Korda	(United Kingdom) Cameron Norrie [12]	6–3, 6–0, 6–4
Women's singles 1st round	(Czech Republic) Barbora Krejčíková [4]	(Germany) Andrea Petkovic	6–2, 6–0
Men's singles 1st round (Note: This match was originally scheduled to play on 1573 Arena, but later moved to Kia Arena.)	(Russia) Aslan Karatsev [18]	(Spain) Jaume Munar	3–6, 7–6^{(7–1)}, 6–7^{(3–7)}, 6–4, 6–4
Matches on 1573 Arena
Event	Winner	Loser	Score
Women's singles 1st round	(United States) Amanda Anisimova	(Netherlands) Arianne Hartono [Q]	2–6, 6–4, 6–3
Men's singles 1st round	(Russia) Karen Khachanov [28]	(United States) Denis Kudla	3–6, 6–3, 6–2, 7–6^{(7–2)}
Women's singles 1st round	(Spain) Nuria Párrizas Díaz	(Romania) Irina Bara [LL]	6–3, 6–1
Men's singles 1st round	(Serbia) Miomir Kecmanović	(Italy) Salvatore Caruso [LL]	6–4, 6–2, 6–1
Coloured background indicates a night match
Day matches began at 11 am, whilst night matches began at 7 pm AEDT

== Day 2 (18 January) ==
- Seeds out:
  - Men's singles: (Georgia (country)) Nikoloz Basilashvili [21], (United States) John Isner [22], (France) Ugo Humbert [29]
  - Women's singles: (Germany) Angelique Kerber [16], (Czech Republic) Petra Kvitová [20], (Canada) Leylah Fernandez [23]
- Schedule of Play

Matches on main courts
Matches on Rod Laver Arena
Event	Winner	Loser	Score
Women's singles 1st round	(Spain) Garbiñe Muguruza [3]	(France) Clara Burel	6–3, 6–4
Women's singles 1st round	(Poland) Iga Świątek [7]	(United Kingdom) Harriet Dart [Q]	6–3, 6–0
Men's singles 1st round	(Russia) Daniil Medvedev [2]	(Switzerland) Henri Laaksonen	6–1, 6–4, 7–6^{(7–3)}
Women's singles 1st round	(Belarus) Aryna Sabalenka [2]	(Australia) Storm Sanders [WC]	5–7, 6–3, 6–2
Men's singles 1st round	(Greece) Stefanos Tsitsipas [4]	(Sweden) Mikael Ymer	6–2, 6–4, 6–3
Matches on Margaret Court Arena
Event	Winner	Loser	Score
Women's singles 1st round	(Sweden) Rebecca Peterson	(Australia) Daria Saville [WC]	6–2, 6–3
Men's singles 1st round	(Russia) Andrey Rublev [5]	(Italy) Gianluca Mager	6–3, 6–2, 6–2
Women's singles 1st round	(Romania) Simona Halep [14]	(Poland) Magdalena Fręch	6–4, 6–3
Men's singles 1st round	(Australia) Alex de Minaur [32]	(Italy) Lorenzo Musetti	3–6, 6–3, 6–0, 6–3
Women's singles 1st round	(United Kingdom) Emma Raducanu [17]	(United States) Sloane Stephens	6–0, 2–6, 6–1
Matches on John Cain Arena
Event	Winner	Loser	Score
Women's singles 1st round	(Romania) Sorana Cîrstea	(Czech Republic) Petra Kvitová [20]	6–2, 6–2
Women's singles 1st round	(Estonia) Anett Kontaveit [6]	(Czech Republic) Kateřina Siniaková	6–2, 6–3
Men's singles 1st round	(United Kingdom) Andy Murray [WC]	(Georgia (country)) Nikoloz Basilashvili [21]	6–1, 3–6, 6–4, 6–7^{(5–7)}, 6–4
Men's singles 1st round	(Australia) Nick Kyrgios	(United Kingdom) Liam Broady [Q]	6–4, 6–4, 6–3
Matches on Kia Arena
Event	Winner	Loser	Score
Women's singles 1st round	(Australia) Samantha Stosur [WC]	(United States) Robin Anderson [WC]	6–7^{(5–7)}, 6–3, 6–3
Men's singles 1st round	(Italy) Jannik Sinner [11]	(Portugal) João Sousa [LL]	6–4, 7–5, 6–1
Men's singles 1st round	(Slovakia) Alex Molčan	(Russia) Roman Safiullin [LL]	6–3, 7–6^{(11–9)}, 5–7, 7–6^{(8–6)}
Women's singles 1st round	(Estonia) Kaia Kanepi	(Germany) Angelique Kerber [16]	6–4, 6–3
Matches on 1573 Arena
Event	Winner	Loser	Score
Men's singles 1st round	(Argentina) Diego Schwartzman [13]	(Serbia) Filip Krajinović	6–3, 6–4, 7–5
Women's singles 1st round	(Australia) Maddison Inglis [WC]	(Canada) Leylah Fernandez [23]	6–4, 6–2
Men's singles 1st round	(Canada) Félix Auger-Aliassime [9]	(Finland) Emil Ruusuvuori	6–4, 0–6, 3–6, 6–3, 6–4
Women's singles 1st round	(United States) Danielle Collins [27]	(United States) Caroline Dolehide [Q]	6–1, 6–3
Coloured background indicates a night match
Day matches began at 11 am, whilst night matches began at 7 pm AEDT

== Day 3 (19 January) ==
- Seeds out:
  - Men's singles: (Poland) Hubert Hurkacz [10]
  - Women's singles: (Switzerland) Belinda Bencic [22], (Spain) Sara Sorribes Tormo [32]
  - Men's doubles: (El Salvador) Marcelo Arévalo / (Netherlands) Jean-Julien Rojer [14]
  - Women's doubles: (Ukraine) Nadiia Kichenok / (India) Sania Mirza [12], (Romania) Irina-Camelia Begu / (Serbia) Nina Stojanović [15]
- Schedule of Play

Matches on main courts
Matches on Rod Laver Arena
Event	Winner	Loser	Score
Women's singles 2nd round	(Spain) Paula Badosa [8]	(Italy) Martina Trevisan [Q]	6–0, 6–3
Women's singles 2nd round	(Australia) Ashleigh Barty [1]	(Italy) Lucia Bronzetti [Q]	6–1, 6–1
Men's singles 2nd round	(Spain) Rafael Nadal [6]	(Germany) Yannick Hanfmann [Q]	6–2, 6–3, 6–4
Women's singles 2nd round	(Japan) Naomi Osaka [13]	(United States) Madison Brengle	6–0, 6–4
Men's singles 2nd round	(Germany) Alexander Zverev [3]	(Australia) John Millman	6–4, 6–4, 6–0
Matches on Margaret Court Arena
Event	Winner	Loser	Score
Women's singles 2nd round	(Ukraine) Elina Svitolina [15]	(France) Harmony Tan	6–3, 5–7, 5–1, retired
Men's singles 2nd round	(Canada) Denis Shapovalov [14]	(South Korea) Kwon Soon-woo	7–6^{(8–6)}, 6–7^{(3–7)}, 6–7^{(6–8)}, 7–5, 6–2
Women's singles 2nd round	(Czech Republic) Barbora Krejčíková [4]	(China) Wang Xiyu [WC]	6–2, 6–3
Women's singles 2nd round	(Greece) Maria Sakkari [5]	(China) Zheng Qinwen [Q]	6–1, 6–4
Men's singles 2nd round	(France) Gaël Monfils [17]	(Kazakhstan) Alexander Bublik	6–1, 6–0, 6–4
Matches on John Cain Arena
Event	Winner	Loser	Score
Women's singles 2nd round	(Italy) Camila Giorgi [30]	(Czech Republic) Tereza Martincová	6–2, 7–6^{(7–2)}
Women's singles 2nd round	(United States) Madison Keys	(Romania) Jaqueline Cristian	6–2, 7–5
Men's singles 2nd round	(Italy) Matteo Berrettini [7]	(United States) Stefan Kozlov [WC]	6–1, 4–6, 6–4, 6–1
Men's singles 2nd round	(France) Adrian Mannarino	(Poland) Hubert Hurkacz [10]	6–4, 6–2, 6–3
Matches on Kia Arena
Event	Winner	Loser	Score
Women's singles 2nd round	(Belarus) Victoria Azarenka [24]	(Switzerland) Jil Teichmann	6–1, 6–2
Men's singles 2nd round	(Spain) Pablo Carreño Busta [19]	(Netherlands) Tallon Griekspoor	6–3, 6–7^{(6–8)}, 7–6^{(7–3)}, 3–6, 6–4
Women's singles 2nd round	(United States) Amanda Anisimova	(Switzerland) Belinda Bencic [22]	6–2, 7–5
Men's singles 2nd round	(Russia) Aslan Karatsev [18]	(United States) Mackenzie McDonald	3–6, 6–2, 6–2, 6–3
Matches on 1573 Arena
Event	Winner	Loser	Score
Women's singles 2nd round	(Ukraine) Marta Kostyuk	(Spain) Sara Sorribes Tormo [32]	7–6^{(7–5)}, 6–3
Women's singles 2nd round	(United States) Jessica Pegula [21]	(United States) Bernarda Pera	6–4, 6–4
Men's singles 2nd round	(Spain) Carlos Alcaraz [31]	(Serbia) Dušan Lajović	6–2, 6–1, 7–5
Men's singles 2nd round	(Chile) Cristian Garín [16]	(Spain) Pedro Martínez	6–7^{(1–7)}, 7–6^{(7–4)}, 2–6, 6–2, 6–2
Coloured background indicates a night match
Day matches began at 11 am, whilst night matches began at 7 pm AEDT

== Day 4 (20 January) ==
- Seeds out:
  - Men's singles: (Argentina) Diego Schwartzman [13], (Bulgaria) Grigor Dimitrov [26]
  - Women's singles: (Spain) Garbiñe Muguruza [3], (Estonia) Anett Kontaveit [6], (Kazakhstan) Elena Rybakina [12], (United Kingdom) Emma Raducanu [17]
  - Men's doubles: (France) Nicolas Mahut / (France) Fabrice Martin [7], (Belgium) Sander Gillé / (Belgium) Joran Vliegen [11], (Kazakhstan) Andrey Golubev / (Croatia) Franko Škugor [16]
  - Women's doubles: (Croatia) Darija Jurak Schreiber / (Slovenia) Andreja Klepač [7], (United States) Coco Gauff / (United States) Caty McNally [8]
- Schedule of Play

Matches on main courts
Matches on Rod Laver Arena
Event	Winner	Loser	Score
Women's singles 2nd round	(France) Alizé Cornet	(Spain) Garbiñe Muguruza [3]	6–3, 6–3
Women's singles 2nd round	(Belarus) Aryna Sabalenka [2]	(China) Wang Xinyu	1–6, 6–4, 6–2
Men's singles 2nd round	(Australia) Alex de Minaur [32]	(Poland) Kamil Majchrzak	6–4, 6–4, 6–2
Men's singles 2nd round	(Russia) Daniil Medvedev [2]	(Australia) Nick Kyrgios	7–6^{(7–1)}, 6–4, 4–6, 6–4
Women's singles 2nd round	(Romania) Simona Halep [14]	(Brazil) Beatriz Haddad Maia	6–2, 6–0
Matches on Margaret Court Arena
Event	Winner	Loser	Score
Women's singles 2nd round	(Denmark) Clara Tauson	(Estonia) Anett Kontaveit [6]	6–2, 6–4
Women's singles 2nd round	(Australia) Maddison Inglis [WC]	(United States) Hailey Baptiste [Q]	7–6^{(7–4)}, 2–6, 6–2
Men's singles 2nd round	(Greece) Stefanos Tsitsipas [4]	(Argentina) Sebastián Báez	7–6^{(7–1)}, 6–7^{(5–7)}, 6–3, 6–4
Women's singles 2nd round	(Montenegro) Danka Kovinić	(United Kingdom) Emma Raducanu [17]	6–4, 4–6, 6–3
Men's singles 2nd round	(Italy) Jannik Sinner [11]	(United States) Steve Johnson	6–2, 6–4, 6–3
Matches on John Cain Arena
Event	Winner	Loser	Score
Women's singles 2nd round	(Poland) Iga Świątek [7]	(Sweden) Rebecca Peterson	6–2, 6–2
Men's singles 2nd round	(United States) Taylor Fritz [20]	(United States) Frances Tiafoe	6–4, 6–3, 7–6^{(7–5)}
Women's singles 2nd round	(China) Zhang Shuai	(Kazakhstan) Elena Rybakina [12]	6–4, 1–0, retired
Men's singles 2nd round	(Japan) Taro Daniel [Q]	(United Kingdom) Andy Murray [WC]	6–4, 6–4, 6–4
Matches on Kia Arena
Event	Winner	Loser	Score
Men's singles 2nd round	(Russia) Andrey Rublev [5]	(Lithuania) Ričardas Berankis	6–4, 6–2, 6–0
Women's singles 2nd round	(Russia) Anastasia Pavlyuchenkova [10]	(Australia) Samantha Stosur [WC]	6–2, 6–2
Men's singles 2nd round	(Canada) Félix Auger-Aliassime [9]	(Spain) Alejandro Davidovich Fokina	7–6^{(7–4)}, 6–7^{(4–7)}, 7–6^{(7–5)}, 7–6^{(7–4)}
Men's doubles 1st round	(Australia) Matthew Ebden (Australia) Max Purcell	(Israel) Jonathan Erlich (Sweden) André Göransson	7–6^{(7–5)}, 6–3
Matches on 1573 Arena
Event	Winner	Loser	Score
Women's singles 2nd round	(United States) Danielle Collins [27]	(Croatia) Ana Konjuh	6–4, 6–3
Men's singles 2nd round	(United Kingdom) Dan Evans [24]	(France) Arthur Rinderknech	Walkover
Men's singles 2nd round	(Spain) Roberto Bautista Agut [15]	(Germany) Philipp Kohlschreiber	6–1, 6–0, 6–3
Men's doubles 1st round (Note: This match was originally scheduled to play at Court 3, but was moved to 1573 Arena.)	(Australia) Dane Sweeny [WC] (Australia) Li Tu [WC]	(Kazakhstan) Andrey Golubev [16] (Croatia) Franko Škugor [16]	5–2, retired
Coloured background indicates a night match
Day matches began at 11 am, whilst night matches began at 7 pm AEDT

== Day 5 (21 January) ==
Desirae Krawczyk was attempting to make history to complete a non-calendar-year Mixed Doubles Grand Slam in the Open Era, having won the French Open, Wimbedon and the US Open in 2021. However, she and her partner Joe Salisbury lost to Giuliana Olmos and Marcelo Arévalo in the first round.

- Seeds out:
  - Men's singles: (Chile) Cristian Garín [16], (Russia) Aslan Karatsev [18], (United States) Reilly Opelka [23], (Italy) Lorenzo Sonego [25], (Russia) Karen Khachanov [28], (Spain) Carlos Alcaraz [31]
  - Women's singles: (Japan) Naomi Osaka [13], (Ukraine) Elina Svitolina [15], (Latvia) Jeļena Ostapenko [26], (Russia) Veronika Kudermetova [28], (Italy) Camila Giorgi [30]
  - Men's doubles: (Croatia) Nikola Mektić / (Croatia) Mate Pavić [1]
  - Women's doubles: (Australia) Samantha Stosur / (China) Zhang Shuai [4]
  - Mixed doubles: (United States) Desirae Krawczyk / (United Kingdom) Joe Salisbury [1], (United States) Nicole Melichar-Martinez / (Colombia) Robert Farah [3]
- Schedule of Play

Matches on main courts
Matches on Rod Laver Arena
Event	Winner	Loser	Score
Women's singles 3rd round	(Belarus) Victoria Azarenka [24]	(Ukraine) Elina Svitolina [15]	6–0, 6–2
Women's singles 3rd round	(Czech Republic) Barbora Krejčíková [4]	(Latvia) Jeļena Ostapenko [26]	2–6, 6–4, 6–4
Men's singles 3rd round	(Italy) Matteo Berrettini [7]	(Spain) Carlos Alcaraz [31]	6–2, 7–6^{(7–3)}, 4–6, 2–6, 7–6^{(10–5)}
Women's singles 3rd round	(Australia) Ashleigh Barty [1]	(Italy) Camila Giorgi [30]	6–2, 6–3
Men's singles 3rd round	(Spain) Rafael Nadal [6]	(Russia) Karen Khachanov [28]	6–3, 6–2, 3–6, 6–1
Matches on Margaret Court Arena
Event	Winner	Loser	Score
Women's singles 3rd round	(United States) Jessica Pegula [21]	(Spain) Nuria Párrizas Díaz	7–6^{(7–3)}, 6–2
Women's singles 3rd round	(Spain) Paula Badosa [8]	(Ukraine) Marta Kostyuk	6–2, 5–7, 6–4
Men's singles 3rd round	(Canada) Denis Shapovalov [14]	(United States) Reilly Opelka [23]	7–6^{(7–4)}, 4–6, 6–3, 6–4
Women's singles 3rd round	(United States) Amanda Anisimova	(Japan) Naomi Osaka [13]	4–6, 6–3, 7–6^{(10–5)}
Men's singles 3rd round	(France) Adrian Mannarino	(Russia) Aslan Karatsev [18]	7–6^{(7–4)}, 6–7^{(4–7)}, 7–5, 6–4
Matches on John Cain Arena
Event	Winner	Loser	Score
Men's doubles 2nd round	(Australia) John Peers [5] (Slovakia) Filip Polášek [5]	(Australia) Rinky Hijikata [WC] (Australia) Tristan Schoolkate [WC]	6–1, 3–6, 6–1
Women's singles 3rd round	(Greece) Maria Sakkari [5]	(Russia) Veronika Kudermetova [28]	6–4, 6–1
Women's doubles 2nd round	(Poland) Magda Linette (United States) Bernarda Pera	(Australia) Samantha Stosur [4] (China) Zhang Shuai [4]	6–7^{(6–8)}, 6–1, 7–5
Men's singles 3rd round	(Germany) Alexander Zverev [3]	(Moldova) Radu Albot [Q]	6–3, 6–4, 6–4
Matches on Kia Arena
Event	Winner	Loser	Score
Women's doubles 2nd round	(United States) Caroline Dolehide [9] (Australia) Storm Sanders [9]	(Japan) Eri Hozumi (Japan) Makoto Ninomiya	5–7, 7–6^{(7–2)}, 7–6^{(10–7)}
Men's singles 3rd round	(France) Gaël Monfils [17]	(Chile) Cristian Garín [16]	7–6^{(7–4)}, 6–1, 6–3
Men's doubles 2nd round	(Australia) Dane Sweeny [WC] (Australia) Li Tu [WC]	(Philippines) Treat Huey [WC] (Indonesia) Christopher Rungkat [WC]	7–6^{(8–6)}, 6–4
Men's doubles 2nd round	(Australia) Thanasi Kokkinakis [WC] (Australia) Nick Kyrgios [WC]	(Croatia) Nikola Mektić [1] (Croatia) Mate Pavić [1]	7–6^{(10–8)}, 6–3
Matches on 1573 Arena
Event	Winner	Loser	Score
Women's doubles 2nd round	(Japan) Shuko Aoyama [2] (Japan) Ena Shibahara [2]	(Australia) Lizette Cabrera [WC] (Australia) Priscilla Hon [WC]	6–3, 6–2
Men's singles 3rd round	(Serbia) Miomir Kecmanović	(Italy) Lorenzo Sonego [25]	6–4, 6–7^{(8–10)}, 6–2, 7–5
Men's doubles 2nd round	(Australia) Jason Kubler [WC] (Australia) Christopher O'Connell [WC]	(United States) Nathaniel Lammons [Alt] (United States) Jackson Withrow [Alt]	6–7^{(1–7)}, 6–4, 6–2
Coloured background indicates a night match
Day matches began at 11 am, whilst night matches began at 7 pm AEDT

== Day 6 (22 January) ==
- Seeds out:
  - Men's singles: (Russia) Andrey Rublev [5], (Spain) Roberto Bautista Agut [15], (United Kingdom) Dan Evans [24]
  - Women's singles: (Russia) Anastasia Pavlyuchenkova [10], (Russia) Daria Kasatkina [25], (Slovenia) Tamara Zidanšek [29], (Czech Republic) Markéta Vondroušová [31]
  - Men's doubles: (Colombia) Juan Sebastián Cabal / (Colombia) Robert Farah [4], (Croatia) Ivan Dodig / (Brazil) Marcelo Melo [9]
  - Women's doubles: (Canada) Gabriela Dabrowski / (Mexico) Giuliana Olmos [6], (Czech Republic) Marie Bouzková / (Czech Republic) Lucie Hradecká [10], (Ukraine) Lyudmyla Kichenok / (Latvia) Jeļena Ostapenko [11], (United States) Asia Muhammad / (United States) Jessica Pegula [13]
  - Mixed doubles: (Serbia) Nina Stojanović / (Croatia) Mate Pavić [7]
- Schedule of Play

Matches on main courts
Matches on Rod Laver Arena
Event	Winner	Loser	Score
Women's singles 3rd round	(United States) Danielle Collins [27]	(Denmark) Clara Tauson	4–6, 6–4, 7–5
Women's singles 3rd round	(Estonia) Kaia Kanepi	(Australia) Maddison Inglis [WC]	2–6, 6–2, 6–0
Men's singles 3rd round	(Greece) Stefanos Tsitsipas [4]	(France) Benoît Paire	6–3, 7–5, 6–7^{(2–7)}, 6–4
Men's singles 3rd round	(Australia) Alex de Minaur [32]	(Spain) Pablo Andújar	6–4, 6–4, 6–2
Women's singles 3rd round	(Romania) Sorana Cîrstea	(Russia) Anastasia Pavlyuchenkova [10]	6–3, 2–6, 6–2
Matches on Margaret Court Arena
Event	Winner	Loser	Score
Women's singles 3rd round	(France) Alizé Cornet	(Slovenia) Tamara Zidanšek [29]	4–6, 6–4, 6–2
Women's singles 3rd round	(Belarus) Aryna Sabalenka [2]	(Czech Republic) Markéta Vondroušová [31]	4–6, 6–3, 6–1
Men's singles 3rd round	(Russia) Daniil Medvedev [2]	(Netherlands) Botic van de Zandschulp	6–4, 6–4, 6–2
Women's singles 3rd round	(Poland) Iga Świątek [7]	(Russia) Daria Kasatkina [25]	6–2, 6–3
Men's singles 3rd round	(Croatia) Marin Čilić [27]	(Russia) Andrey Rublev [5]	7–5, 7–6^{(7–3)}, 3–6, 6–3
Matches on John Cain Arena
Event	Winner	Loser	Score
Women's Legends' Doubles	(Zimbabwe) Cara Black (Austria) Barbara Schett	(Australia) Nicole Bradtke (Australia) Rennae Stubbs	6–4, 6–3
Women's singles 3rd round	(Romania) Simona Halep [14]	(Montenegro) Danka Kovinić	6–2, 6–1
Women's doubles 2nd round	(Czech Republic) Barbora Krejčíková [1] (Czech Republic) Kateřina Siniaková [1]	(Australia) Monique Adamczak [PR] (China) Han Xinyun [PR]	6–3, 6–3
Men's singles 3rd round	(Canada) Félix Auger-Aliassime [9]	(United Kingdom) Dan Evans [24]	6–4, 6–1, 6–1
Matches on Kia Arena
Event	Winner	Loser	Score
Men's doubles 2nd round	(Germany) Tim Pütz [6] (New Zealand) Michael Venus [6]	(Spain) Roberto Carballés Baena (France) Hugo Gaston	6–1, 6–4
Women's singles 3rd round	(Belgium) Elise Mertens [19]	(China) Zhang Shuai	6–2, 6–2
Men's singles 3rd round	(United States) Taylor Fritz [20]	(Spain) Roberto Bautista Agut [15]	6–0, 3–6, 3–6, 6–4, 6–3
Men's singles 3rd round	(Italy) Jannik Sinner [11]	(Japan) Taro Daniel [Q]	6–4, 1–6, 6–3, 6–1
Matches on 1573 Arena
Event	Winner	Loser	Score
Men's doubles 2nd round	(Italy) Simone Bolelli (Italy) Fabio Fognini	(Croatia) Ivan Dodig [9] (Brazil) Marcelo Melo [9]	7–6^{(7–2)}, 6–3
Men's doubles 2nd round	(Australia) Matthew Ebden (Australia) Max Purcell	(Colombia) Juan Sebastián Cabal [4] (Colombia) Robert Farah [4]	3–6, 6–3, 7–5
Women's doubles 2nd round	(United States) Danielle Collins (United States) Desirae Krawczyk	(United States) Asia Muhammad [13] (United States) Jessica Pegula [13]	6–3, 7–6^{(7–2)}
Mixed Doubles 1st round	(China) Zhang Shuai [2] (Australia) John Peers [2]	(Slovenia) Andreja Klepač (Belgium) Joran Vliegen	6–1, 6–4
Mixed Doubles 1st round	(Australia) Samantha Stosur [WC] (Australia) Matthew Ebden [WC]	(United States) Asia Muhammad (France) Fabrice Martin	6–2, 7–6^{(7–3)}
Coloured background indicates a night match
Day matches began at 11 am, whilst night matches began at 7 pm AEDT

== Day 7 (23 January) ==
- Seeds out:
  - Men's singles: (Germany) Alexander Zverev [3], (Spain) Pablo Carreño Busta [19]
  - Women's singles: (Greece) Maria Sakkari [5], (Spain) Paula Badosa [8], (Belarus) Victoria Azarenka [24]
  - Men's doubles: (United Kingdom) Jamie Murray / (Brazil) Bruno Soares [8], (Germany) Kevin Krawietz / (Germany) Andreas Mies [12], (Uruguay) Ariel Behar / (Ecuador) Gonzalo Escobar [15]
  - Women's doubles: (China) Xu Yifan / (China) Yang Zhaoxuan [14]
- Schedule of Play

Matches on main courts
Matches on Rod Laver Arena
Event	Winner	Loser	Score
Women's singles 4th round	(United States) Madison Keys	(Spain) Paula Badosa [8]	6–3, 6–1
Women's singles 4th round	(Czech Republic) Barbora Krejčíková [4]	(Belarus) Victoria Azarenka [24]	6–2, 6–2
Men's singles 4th round	(Spain) Rafael Nadal [6]	(France) Adrian Mannarino	7–6^{(16–14)}, 6–2, 6–2
Women's singles 4th round	(Australia) Ashleigh Barty [1]	(United States) Amanda Anisimova	6–4, 6–3
Men's singles 4th round	(Italy) Matteo Berrettini [7]	(Spain) Pablo Carreño Busta [19]	7–5, 7–6^{(7–4)}, 6–4
Matches on Margaret Court Arena
Event	Winner	Loser	Score
Women's doubles 3rd round	(Russia) Veronika Kudermetova (Belgium) Elise Mertens [3]	(China) Xu Yifan (China) Yang Zhaoxuan [14]	7–6^{(7–5)}, 6–4
Women's singles 4th round	(United States) Jessica Pegula [21]	(Greece) Maria Sakkari [5]	7–6^{(7–0)}, 6–3
Men's singles 4th round	(Canada) Denis Shapovalov [14]	(Germany) Alexander Zverev [3]	6–3, 7–6^{(7–5)}, 6–3
Matches on John Cain Arena
Event	Winner	Loser	Score
Men's Legends' Doubles	(Australia) Mark Philippoussis (Australia) Pat Rafter	(South Africa) Wayne Ferreira (Australia) Sam Groth	6–3, 6–4
Men's doubles 3rd round	(Australia) John Peers [5] (Slovakia) Filip Polášek [5]	(Germany) Kevin Krawietz [12] (Germany) Andreas Mies [12]	6–1, 6–2
Men's doubles 3rd round	(Germany) Tim Pütz [6] (New Zealand) Michael Venus [6]	(Australia) Jason Kubler [WC] (Australia) Christopher O'Connell [WC]	Walkover
Men's doubles 3rd round (Note: This match was originally scheduled on Court 3, but later moved to John Cain Arena)	(Spain) Marcel Granollers [3] (Argentina) Horacio Zeballos [3]	(Spain) Pablo Andújar (Spain) Pedro Martínez	7–5, 7–5
Men's singles 4th round	(France) Gaël Monfils [17]	(Serbia) Miomir Kecmanović	7–5, 7–6^{(7–4)}, 6–3
Matches on Kia Arena
Event	Winner	Loser	Score
Women's doubles 3rd round	(Kazakhstan) Anna Danilina (Brazil) Beatriz Haddad Maia	(Spain) Aliona Bolsova (Norway) Ulrikke Eikeri	3–6, 6–4, 7–6^{(10–5)}
Wheelchair women's singles Quarterfinals	(Netherlands) Diede de Groot [1]	(United States) Dana Mathewson	6–2, 6–1
Men's doubles 3rd round	(Australia) Thanasi Kokkinakis [WC] (Australia) Nick Kyrgios [WC]	(Uruguay) Ariel Behar [15] (Ecuador) Gonzalo Escobar [15]	6–4, 4–6, 6–4
Wheelchair quad singles Quarterfinals	(Australia) Dylan Alcott [1]	(Netherlands) Niels Vink	6–7^{(1–7)}, 6–4, 6–2
Matches on 1573 Arena
Event	Winner	Loser	Score
Girls' Singles 1st round	(Australia) Taylah Preston [WC]	(Lithuania) Patricija Paukštytė	6–2, 6–1
Boys' singles 1st round	(Canada) Jaden Weekes	(Australia) Cooper Errey [WC]	7–5, 7–6^{(7–4)}
Girls' Singles 1st round	(Iran) Meshkatolzahra Safi	(Australia) Anja Nayar [Q]	6–4, 6–3
Girls' Singles 1st round	(Czech Republic) Amélie Šmejkalová	(Australia) Catherine Aulia [WC]	6–4, 3–6, 6–0
Boys' singles 1st round	(Croatia) Dino Prižmić [14]	(Australia) Alec Braund [WC]	6–1, 6–1
Girls' doubles 1st round (Note: This match was originally scheduled on Court 15, but later moved to 1573 Arena)	(Canada) Mia Kupres (United Kingdom) Ranah Stoiber	(Germany) Carolina Kuhl (Serbia) Tijana Sretenović	4–6, 6–3, [10–7]
Coloured background indicates a night match
Day matches began at 11 am, whilst night matches began at 7 pm AEDT

== Day 8 (24 January) ==
- Seeds out:
  - Men's singles: (United States) Taylor Fritz [20], (Croatia) Marin Čilić [27], (Australia) Alex de Minaur [32]
  - Women's singles: (Belarus) Aryna Sabalenka [2], (Romania) Simona Halep [14], (Belgium) Elise Mertens [19]
  - Men's doubles: (South Africa) Raven Klaasen / (Japan) Ben McLachlan [13]
  - Women's doubles: (Chile) Alexa Guarachi / (United States) Nicole Melichar-Martinez [5], (Slovakia) Viktória Kužmová / (Russia) Vera Zvonareva [16]
  - Mixed doubles: (Chile) Alexa Guarachi / (Germany) Tim Pütz [4]
- Schedule of Play

Matches on main courts
Matches on Rod Laver Arena
Event	Winner	Loser	Score
Women's singles 4th round	(United States) Danielle Collins [27]	(Belgium) Elise Mertens [19]	4–6, 6–4, 6–4
Women's singles 4th round	(France) Alizé Cornet	(Romania) Simona Halep [14]	6–4, 3–6, 6–4
Men's singles 4th round	(Italy) Jannik Sinner [11]	(Australia) Alex de Minaur [32]	7–6^{(7–3)}, 6–3, 6–4
Men's singles 4th round	(Greece) Stefanos Tsitsipas [4]	(United States) Taylor Fritz [20]	4–6, 6–4, 4–6, 6–3, 6–4
Matches on Margaret Court Arena
Event	Winner	Loser	Score
Women's doubles 3rd round	(United States) Caroline Dolehide [9] (Australia) Storm Sanders [9]	(Ukraine) Marta Kostyuk (Ukraine) Dayana Yastremska	6–4, 6–4
Mixed Doubles 2nd round	(Czech Republic) Lucie Hradecká (Ecuador) Gonzalo Escobar	(Mexico) Giuliana Olmos (El Salvador) Marcelo Arévalo	6–4, 6–4
Men's singles 4th round	(Russia) Daniil Medvedev [2]	(United States) Maxime Cressy	6–2, 7–6^{(7–4)}, 6–7^{(4–7)}, 7–5
Women's singles 4th round	(Poland) Iga Świątek [7]	(Romania) Sorana Cîrstea	5–7, 6–3, 6–3
Women's singles 4th round (Note: This match was originally scheduled on Rod Laver Arena, but later moved to Margaret Court Arena)	(Estonia) Kaia Kanepi	(Belarus) Aryna Sabalenka [2]	5–7, 6–2, 7–6^{(10–7)}
Matches on John Cain Arena
Event	Winner	Loser	Score
Men's doubles 3rd round	(Netherlands) Wesley Koolhof [10] (United Kingdom) Neal Skupski [10]	(United States) Marcos Giron (South Korea) Kwon Soon-woo	6–3, 6–4
Men's doubles 3rd round	(United States) Rajeev Ram [2] (United Kingdom) Joe Salisbury [2]	(Australia) Dane Sweeny [WC] (Australia) Li Tu [WC]	6–4, 6–4
Men's singles 4th round	(Canada) Félix Auger-Aliassime [9]	(Croatia) Marin Čilić [27]	2–6, 7–6^{(9–7)}, 6–2, 7–6^{(7–4)}
Matches on Kia Arena
Event	Winner	Loser	Score
Women's Legends' Doubles	(Zimbabwe) Cara Black (Australia) Rennae Stubbs	(Australia) Nicole Bradtke (Austria) Barbara Schett	6–2, 3–6, [10–7]
Men's doubles 3rd round	(Australia) Matthew Ebden (Australia) Max Purcell	(South Africa) Raven Klaasen [13] (Japan) Ben McLachlan [13]	7–6^{(7–3)}, 6–3
Women's doubles 3rd round	(Czech Republic) Barbora Krejčíková [1] (Czech Republic) Kateřina Siniaková [1]	(United States) Danielle Collins (United States) Desirae Krawczyk	6–4, 6–4
Mixed Doubles 2nd round	(Australia) Jaimee Fourlis [WC] (Australia) Jason Kubler [WC]	(Australia) Samantha Stosur [WC] (Australia) Matthew Ebden [WC]	3–6, 7–5, [11–9]
Matches on 1573 Arena
Event	Winner	Loser	Score
Boys' singles 2nd round	(Cyprus) Constantinos Koshis	(Australia) Jeremy Jin [WC]	6–4, 6–2
Girls' Singles 2nd round	(Australia) Charlotte Kempenaers-Pocz	(Japan) Sara Saito [WC]	6–2, 6–3
Boys' doubles 1st round	(Australia) Jeremy Jin [WC] (Australia) Edward Winter [WC]	(South Korea) Gerard Campaña Lee [5] (Argentina) Lautaro Midón [5]	2–6, 6–4, [13–11]
Girls' doubles 1st round	(Australia) Charlotte Kempenaers-Pocz [WC] (Australia) Taylah Preston [WC]	(Brazil) Ana Candiotto (Chinese Taipei) Li Yu-yun	6–1, 1–6, [10–6]
Coloured background indicates a night match
Day matches began at 11 am, whilst night matches began at 7 pm AEDT

== Day 9 (25 January) ==
- Seeds out:
  - Men's singles: (Canada) Denis Shapovalov [14], (France) Gaël Monfils [17]
  - Women's singles: (Czech Republic) Barbora Krejčíková [4], (United States) Jessica Pegula [21]
  - Men's doubles: (Australia) John Peers / (Slovakia) Filip Polášek [5], (Germany) Tim Pütz / (New Zealand) Michael Venus [6]
  - Mixed doubles: (Japan) Ena Shibahara / (Japan) Ben McLachlan [8]
- Schedule of Play

Matches on main courts
Matches on Rod Laver Arena
Event	Winner	Loser	Score
Men's Legends' Doubles	(Australia) Sam Groth (Australia) Pat Rafter	(South Africa) Wayne Ferreira (Australia) Mark Philippoussis	6–4, 2–6, [10–7]
Women's singles Quarterfinals	(United States) Madison Keys	(Czech Republic) Barbora Krejčíková [4]	6–3, 6–2
Men's singles Quarterfinals	(Spain) Rafael Nadal [6]	(Canada) Denis Shapovalov [14]	6–3, 6–4, 4–6, 3–6, 6–3
Women's singles Quarterfinals	(Australia) Ashleigh Barty [1]	(United States) Jessica Pegula [21]	6–2, 6–0
Men's singles Quarterfinals	(Italy) Matteo Berrettini [7]	(France) Gaël Monfils [17]	6–4, 6–4, 3–6, 3–6, 6–2
Matches on Margaret Court Arena
Event	Winner	Loser	Score
Women's doubles Quarterfinals	(Japan) Shuko Aoyama [2] (Japan) Ena Shibahara [2]	(Croatia) Petra Martić (United States) Shelby Rogers	6–1, 6–4
Men's doubles Quarterfinals	(Spain) Marcel Granollers [3] (Argentina) Horacio Zeballos [3]	(Australia) John Peers [5] (Slovakia) Filip Polášek [5]	7–6^{(7–5)}, 6–4
Mixed doubles - Quarterfinals	(Australia) Jaimee Fourlis [WC] (Australia) Jason Kubler [WC]	(India) Sania Mirza (United States) Rajeev Ram	6–4, 7–6^{(7–5)}
Mixed doubles - Quarterfinals	(Czech Republic) Lucie Hradecká (Ecuador) Gonzalo Escobar	(Japan) Makoto Ninomiya [Alt] (Pakistan) Aisam-ul-Haq Qureshi [Alt]	7–5, 7–5
Matches on Kia Arena
Event	Winner	Loser	Score
Wheelchair quad singles Semifinals	(Australia) Dylan Alcott [1]	(United Kingdom) Andy Lapthorne	6–3, 6–0
Women's doubles Quarterfinals	(Kazakhstan) Anna Danilina (Brazil) Beatriz Haddad Maia	(Sweden) Rebecca Peterson (Russia) Anastasia Potapova	4–6, 7–5, 6–3
Men's doubles Quarterfinals	(Australia) Thanasi Kokkinakis [WC] (Australia) Nick Kyrgios [WC]	(Germany) Tim Pütz [6] (New Zealand) Michael Venus [6]	7–5, 3–6, 6–3
Mixed doubles - Quarterfinals	(China) Zhang Shuai [2] (Australia) John Peers [2]	(Japan) Ena Shibahara [8] (Japan) Ben McLachlan [8]	6–4, 6–4
Mixed doubles - Quarterfinals	(France) Kristina Mladenovic [5] (Croatia) Ivan Dodig [5]	(New Zealand) Erin Routliffe (New Zealand) Michael Venus	6–4, 6–2
Matches on 1573 Arena
Event	Winner	Loser	Score
Boys' singles 2nd round	(United States) Bruno Kuzuhara [1]	(Australia) Edward Winter [WC]	7–5, 6–1
Girls' Singles 2nd round	(Belgium) Sofia Costoulas [8]	(Iran) Meshkatolzahra Safi	6–0, 6–2
Girls' doubles 2nd round	(Russia) Ekaterina Khayrutdinova (Kazakhstan) Aruzhan Sagandikova	(Greece) Michaela Laki (Greece) Dimitra Pavlou	6–3, 6–3
Boys' doubles 2nd round	(Italy) Niccolò Ciavarelli (Italy) Daniele Minighini	(Australia) Jeremy Jin [WC] (Australia) Edward Winter [WC]	6–4, 6–2
Coloured background indicates a night match
Day matches began at 11 am, whilst night matches began at 7 pm AEDT

== Day 10 (26 January) ==
- Seeds out:
  - Men's singles: (Canada) Félix Auger-Aliassime [9], (Italy) Jannik Sinner [11]
  - Men's doubles: (Netherlands) Wesley Koolhof / (United Kingdom) Neal Skupski [10]
  - Women's doubles: (United States) Caroline Dolehide / (Australia) Storm Sanders [9]
  - Mixed doubles: (China) Zhang Shuai / (Australia) John Peers [2]
- Schedule of Play

Matches on main courts
Matches on Rod Laver Arena
Event	Winner	Loser	Score
Women's singles Quarterfinals	(United States) Danielle Collins [27]	(France) Alizé Cornet	7–5, 6–1
Women's singles Quarterfinals	(Poland) Iga Świątek [7]	(Estonia) Kaia Kanepi	4–6, 7–6^{(7–2)}, 6–3
Men's singles Quarterfinals	(Greece) Stefanos Tsitsipas [4]	(Italy) Jannik Sinner [11]	6–3, 6–4, 6–2
Men's singles Quarterfinals	(Russia) Daniil Medvedev [2]	(Canada) Félix Auger-Aliassime [9]	6–7^{(4–7)}, 3–6, 7–6^{(7–2)}, 7–5, 6–4
Mixed doubles - Semifinals	(Australia) Jaimee Fourlis [WC] (Australia) Jason Kubler [WC]	(Czech Republic) Lucie Hradecká (Ecuador) Gonzalo Escobar	2–6, 7–6^{(7–2)}, [10–6]
Matches on Margaret Court Arena
Event	Winner	Loser	Score
Women's doubles Quarterfinals	(Russia) Veronika Kudermetova [3] (Belgium) Elise Mertens [3]	(Belgium) Kirsten Flipkens [PR] (Spain) Sara Sorribes Tormo [PR]	6–3, 6–4
Men's doubles Quarterfinals	(United States) Rajeev Ram [2] (United Kingdom) Joe Salisbury [2]	(Italy) Simone Bolelli (Italy) Fabio Fognini	6–3, 6–2
Mixed doubles - Semifinals	(France) Kristina Mladenovic [5] (Croatia) Ivan Dodig [5]	(China) Zhang Shuai [2] (Australia) John Peers [2]	1–6, 7–5, [10–2]
Matches on Kia Arena
Event	Winner	Loser	Score
Mixed Legends' Doubles	(South Africa) Wayne Ferreira (Austria) Barbara Schett	(Australia) Nicole Bradtke (Australia) Sam Groth	6–3, 6–2
Men's doubles Quarterfinals	(Australia) Matthew Ebden (Australia) Max Purcell	(Netherlands) Wesley Koolhof [10] (United Kingdom) Neal Skupski [10]	3–6, 6–4, 7–6^{(10–6)}
Women's doubles Quarterfinals	(Czech Republic) Barbora Krejčíková [1] (Czech Republic) Kateřina Siniaková [1]	(United States) Caroline Dolehide [9] (Australia) Storm Sanders [9]	6–2, 7–6^{(7–3)}
Coloured background indicates a night match
Day matches began at 11 am, whilst night matches began at 7:30 pm AEDT

== Day 11 (27 January) ==
- Seeds out:
  - Women's singles: (Poland) Iga Świątek [7]
  - Men's doubles: (United States) Rajeev Ram / (United Kingdom) Joe Salisbury [2], (Spain) Marcel Granollers / (Argentina) Horacio Zeballos [3]
  - Women's doubles: (Japan) Shuko Aoyama / (Japan) Ena Shibahara [2], (Russia) Veronika Kudermetova / (Belgium) Elise Mertens [3]
- Schedule of Play

Matches on main courts
Matches on Rod Laver Arena
Event	Winner	Loser	Score
Women's doubles Semifinals	(Kazakhstan) Anna Danilina (Brazil) Beatriz Haddad Maia	(Japan) Shuko Aoyama [2] (Japan) Ena Shibahara [2]	6–4, 5–7, 6–4
Men's doubles Semifinals	(Australia) Thanasi Kokkinakis [WC] (Australia) Nick Kyrgios [WC]	(Spain) Marcel Granollers [3] (Argentina) Horacio Zeballos [3]	7–6^{(7-4)}, 6–4
Wheelchair quad singles Final	(Netherlands) Sam Schröder [2]	(Australia) Dylan Alcott [1]	7–5, 6–0
Women's singles Semifinals	(Australia) Ashleigh Barty [1]	(United States) Madison Keys	6–1, 6–3
Women's singles Semifinals	(United States) Danielle Collins [27]	(Poland) Iga Świątek [7]	6–4, 6–1
Matches on Margaret Court Arena
Event	Winner	Loser	Score
Mixed Legends' Doubles	(Zimbabwe) Cara Black (Australia) Pat Rafter	(Australia) Mark Philippoussis (Australia) Rennae Stubbs	7–6^{(7–5)}, 3–6, [10–8]
Women's doubles Semifinals	(Czech Republic) Barbora Krejčíková [1] (Czech Republic) Kateřina Siniaková [1]	(Russia) Veronika Kudermetova [3] (Belgium) Elise Mertens [3]	6–2, 6–3
Men's doubles Semifinals	(Australia) Matthew Ebden (Australia) Max Purcell	(United States) Rajeev Ram [2] (United Kingdom) Joe Salisbury [2]	6–3, 7–6^{(11–9)}
Coloured background indicates a night match
Day matches began at 11 am, whilst night matches began at 7:30 pm AEDT

== Day 12 (28 January) ==
- Seeds out:
  - Men's singles: (Greece) Stefanos Tsitsipas [4], (Italy) Matteo Berrettini [7]
- Schedule of Play

Matches on main courts
Matches on Rod Laver Arena
Event	Winner	Loser	Score
Mixed doubles - Final	(France) Kristina Mladenovic [5] (Croatia) Ivan Dodig [5]	(Australia) Jaimee Fourlis [WC] (Australia) Jason Kubler [WC]	6–3, 6–4
Men's singles Semifinals	(Spain) Rafael Nadal [6]	(Italy) Matteo Berrettini [7]	6–3, 6–2, 3–6, 6–3
Men's singles Semifinals	(Russia) Daniil Medvedev [2]	(Greece) Stefanos Tsitsipas [4]	7–6^{(7–5)}, 4–6, 6–4, 6–1
Matches on Margaret Court Arena
Event	Winner	Loser	Score
Boys' singles Semifinals	(United States) Bruno Kuzuhara [1]	(Paraguay) Adolfo Daniel Vallejo [3]	7–6^{(7–2)}, 6–3
Girls' singles - Semifinals	(Belgium) Sofia Costoulas [8]	(Australia) Charlotte Kempenaers-Pocz	6–4, 6–1
Girls' singles - Semifinals (Note: This match was started on Court 5, but later moved to Margaret Court Arena due to rain)	(Croatia) Petra Marčinko [1]	(United States) Liv Hovde [13]	6–4, 4–6, 6–4
Girls' doubles Final	(United States) Clervie Ngounoue [1] (Russia) Diana Shnaider [1]	(Canada) Kayla Cross (Canada) Victoria Mboko	6–4, 6–3
Boys' doubles Final	(United States) Bruno Kuzuhara [2] (Hong Kong) Coleman Wong [2]	(United States) Alex Michelsen (Paraguay) Adolfo Daniel Vallejo	6–3, 7–6^{(7–3)}
Coloured background indicates a night match
Day matches began at 11:00 am (noon on Rod Laver Arena), whilst night matches began at 7:30 pm AEDT

== Day 13 (29 January) ==
Ashleigh Barty became the first home player to win the title since Chris O'Neil in 1978.

- Seeds out:
  - Women's singles: (United States) Danielle Collins [27]
- Schedule of Play

Matches on main courts
Matches on Rod Laver Arena
Event	Winner	Loser	Score
Girls' singles - Final	(Croatia) Petra Marčinko [1]	(Belgium) Sofia Costoulas [8]	7–5, 6–1
Boys' singles Final	(United States) Bruno Kuzuhara [1]	(Czech Republic) Jakub Menšík [4]	7–6^{(7–5)}, 6–7^{(6–8)}, 7–5
Women's singles Final	(Australia) Ashleigh Barty [1]	(United States) Danielle Collins [27]	6–3, 7–6^{(7–2)}
Men's doubles Final	(Australia) Thanasi Kokkinakis [WC] (Australia) Nick Kyrgios [WC]	(Australia) Matthew Ebden (Australia) Max Purcell	7–5, 6–4
Coloured background indicates a night match
Day matches began at noon, whilst night matches began at 7:30 pm AEDT

== Day 14 (30 January) ==
- Seeds out:
  - Men's singles: (Russia) Daniil Medvedev [2]
- Schedule of Play

Matches on main courts
Matches on Rod Laver Arena
Event	Winner	Loser	Score
Women's doubles Final	(Czech Republic) Barbora Krejčíková [1] (Czech Republic) Kateřina Siniaková [1]	(Kazakhstan) Anna Danilina (Brazil) Beatriz Haddad Maia	6–7^{(3–7)}, 6–4, 6–4
Men's singles Final	(Spain) Rafael Nadal [6]	(Russia) Daniil Medvedev [2]	2–6, 6–7^{(5–7)}, 6–4, 6–4, 7–5
Coloured background indicates a night match
Day matches began at 3:00 pm, whilst night matches began at 7:30 pm AEDT
