= Show Court Arena =

Tennis stadium located in Melbourne Park in Melbourne, Victoria

- Kia Arena
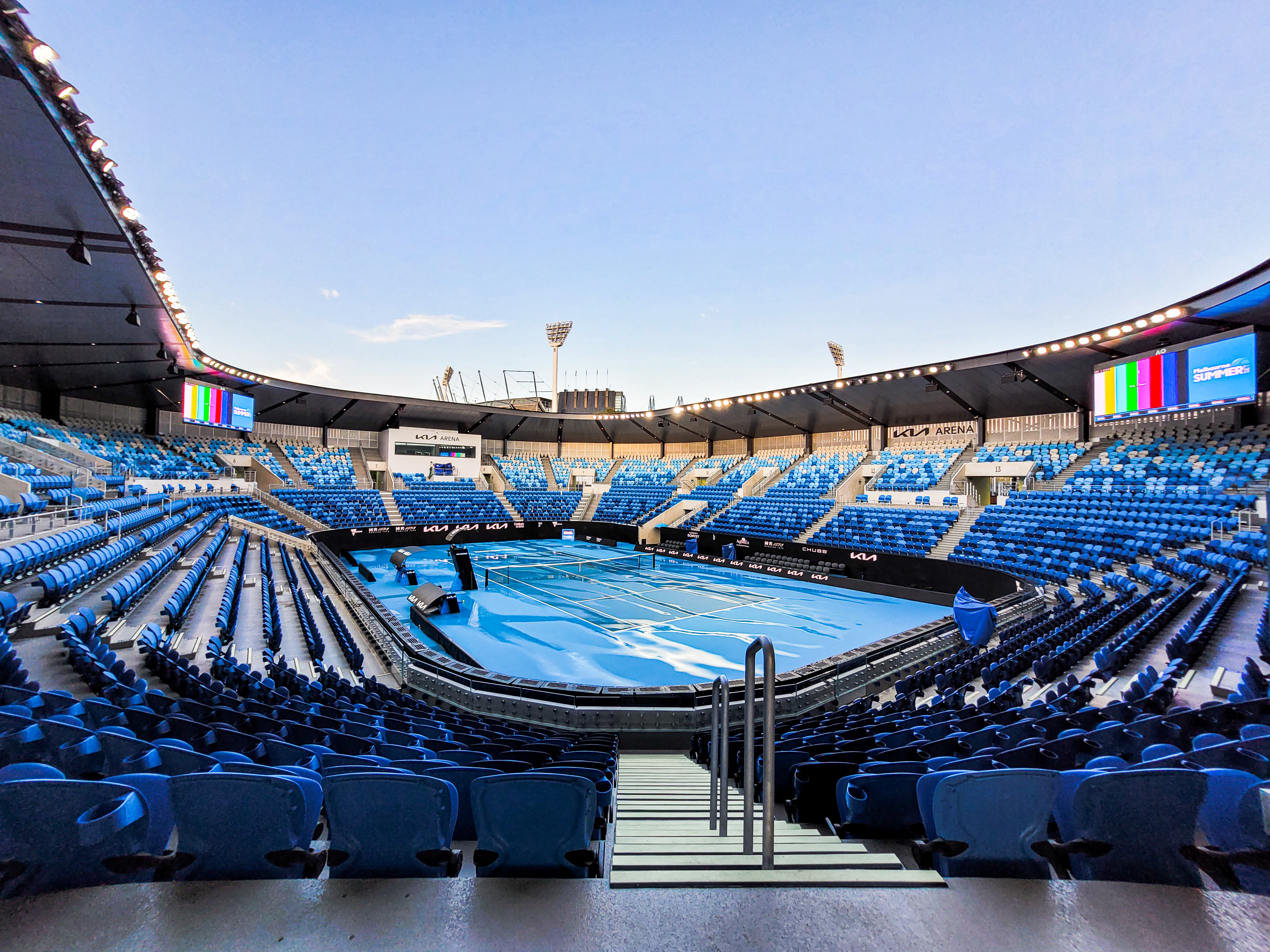
- View of the arena in January 2022
- Interactive map of Show Court Arena
- Full name: Show Court Arena
- Address: 200 Batman Ave; Melbourne VIC 3004; Australia
- Location: Melbourne Park
- Coordinates: 37.82162°S 144.98095°E
- Owner: Government of Victoria
- Operator: Melbourne and Olympic Park Trust
- Capacity: 5,000
- Surface: GreenSet

Construction
- Built: 2019–21
- Opened: January 2022

Tenant
- Australian Open (Tennis) (2022–)

Show Court Arena, also known by naming rights sponsorship as Kia Arena, is an open-air tennis stadium located in Melbourne Park in Melbourne, Victoria, Australia. The arena opened in advance of the 2022 Australian Open. It seats 5,000 spectators and is the fourth-largest tennis venue at Melbourne Park.

== History ==
In April 2017, the Victorian Government announced it would proceed with the third and final stage of the ongoing redevelopment of the Melbourne Park sporting and entertainment precinct, which had begun in 2010. The construction of Show Court Arena was the most prominent component of this redevelopment stage, which came at an overall cost of $271.5 million. The arena is situated on the site of the old Eastern Courts 16–23, between Rod Laver Arena and John Cain Arena, and slightly to the north of the large public grassed area known as "Grand Slam Oval" during the Australian Open. Demolition of the old courts and the adjacent function and broadcast centre (which itself was demolished and replaced with an upgraded facility) commenced in April 2019.

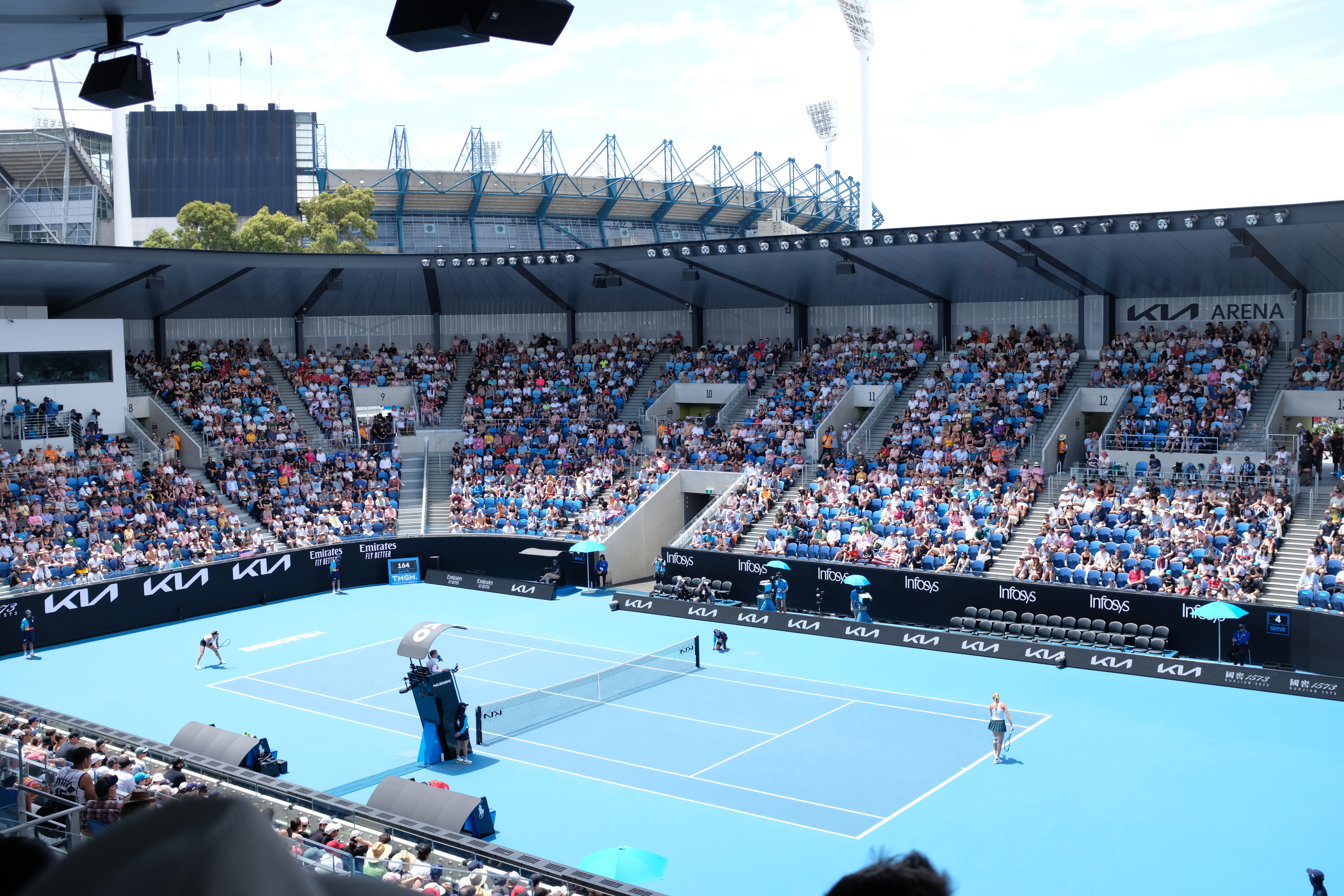
Show Court Arena during the 2023 Australian Open, with the Melbourne Cricket Ground visible.

The arena was constructed with approximately 270 tonnes of steel fabricated entirely in Victoria. It is partially sunken into the ground and has an open-roof structure which provides shade and cover protection for most of the spectators seated in the arena. Unlike the three larger venues at Melbourne Park (Rod Laver Arena, John Cain Arena and Margaret Court Arena), the arena does not have a retractable roof capable of being shut during inclement weather. The arena's roof structure was completed in February 2021, with the seating and interior facilities completed in October that year.

The arena was unveiled by Australian Open officials on 22 November 2021. Belinda Bencic won the first main draw match to be played on the arena, defeating Kristina Mladenovic 6–4, 6–3.

At the 2023 Australian Open, the arena served as the location of the inaugural AO Finals Festival, a musical festival occurring over the final three days of the tournament, with the festival's lineup including Vanessa Amorosi, Montaigne, Benee, Thelma Plum, Winston Surfshirt, Flight Facilities, Lastlings and Forest Claudette. The festival was a sold-out success, which led to the festival's return at the larger John Cain Arena for the 2024 Australian Open.

== Naming ==
During construction the venue was referred to by official sources as Show Court Arena. In January 2021 the stadium was named Kia Arena, in a deal between the Australian Open and the tournament's primary corporate sponsor, Kia motors. This differs from the three larger courts, two of which are named after prominent Australian tennis players and the other for a politician.

== See also ==
- List of tennis stadiums by capacity
- Show Court 2 (Melbourne Park)
