= Court 3 =

Equal fourth largest tennis court in Melbourne Park, Australia

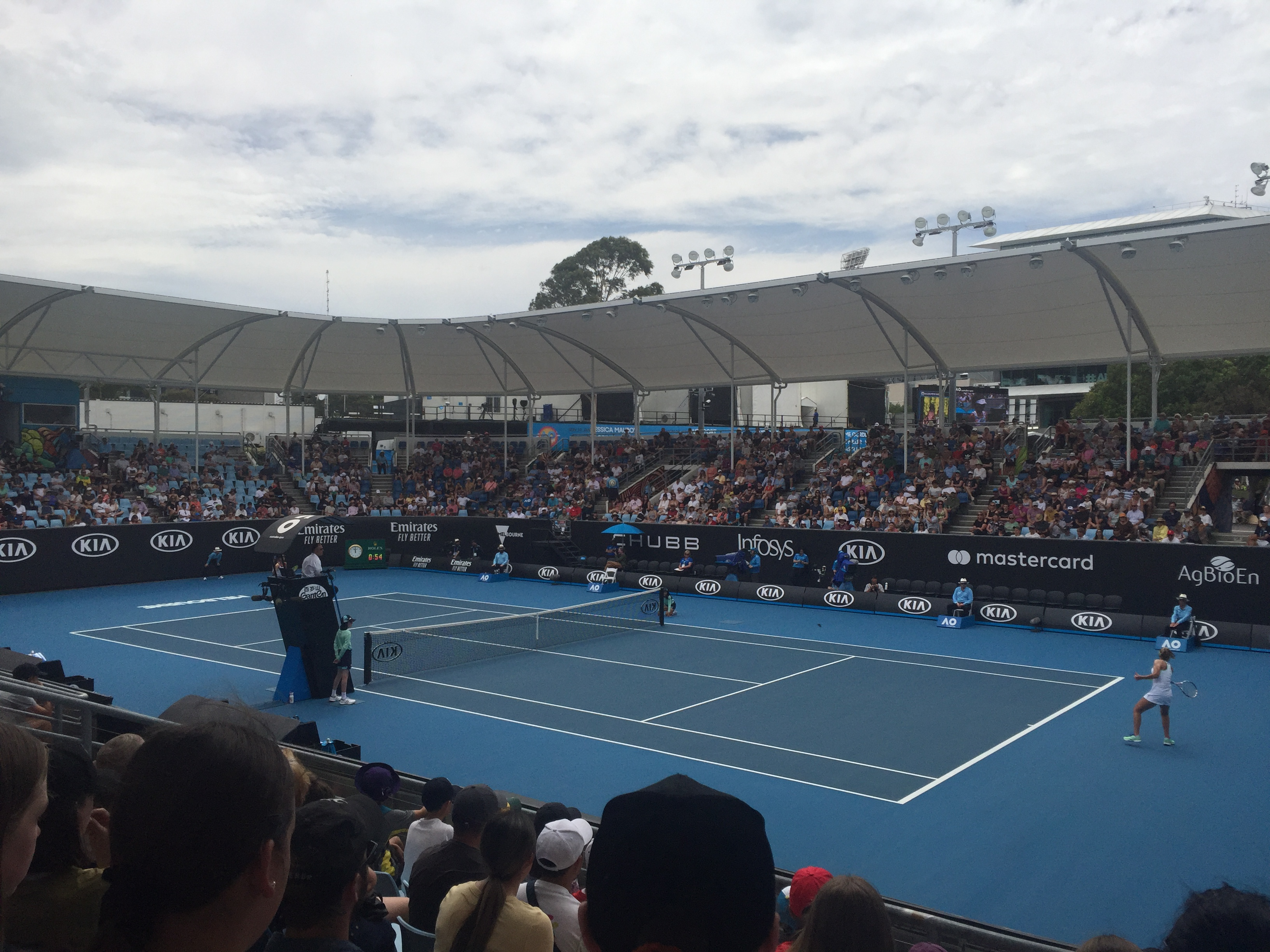
- Sofia Kenin and Ann Li playing on Court 3 during the 2020 Australian Open
- Interactive map of Court 3
- Full name: Court 3 at Melbourne Park
- Location: Melbourne Park, MSEP, Melbourne, Victoria, Australia
- Coordinates: 37.820165°S 144.978145°E
- Owner: Melbourne and Olympic Parks Trust
- Capacity: 3,000
- Surface: GreenSet

Construction
- Built: 1987
- Opened: 1988

Tenant
- Australian Open

Court 3 (also known as ANZ Arena for sponsorship reasons) is the equal-fifth largest tennis court at Melbourne Park, in Melbourne, Australia, the venue of the Australian Open.

== Overview ==
Court 3 has always been available on a walk-up basis for spectators at the Australian Open with a ground pass. It is located to the immediate north of Margaret Court Arena.

It is also utilised by members of the general public outside of the Australian Open, as is the case for all other outdoor courts at Melbourne Park. Prior to commencement of the 2020 Australian Open, the court was installed with a $1 million shaded grandstand covering most of the seating, allowing spectators to seek relief from the hot Australian summer sun. The court is similar in size and stature to the No. 2 and No. 3 courts at the Wimbledon Championships, and is usually populated in the first week of the tournament for late night matches. It has a permanent seating capacity of 3,000.

== Naming rights ==
In the lead-up to the 2026 Australian Open, Court 3 was renamed ANZ Arena, as part of a sponsorship arrangement between the tournament and the banking company. Court 3 was the last of the major show courts at Melbourne Park to receive a sponsored name.

== See also ==
- List of tennis stadiums by capacity
- Show Court 2 (Melbourne Park)
