= Show Court 2 (Melbourne Park) =

Fifth largest tennis court in Melbourne Park, Victoria, Australia

- 1573 Arena
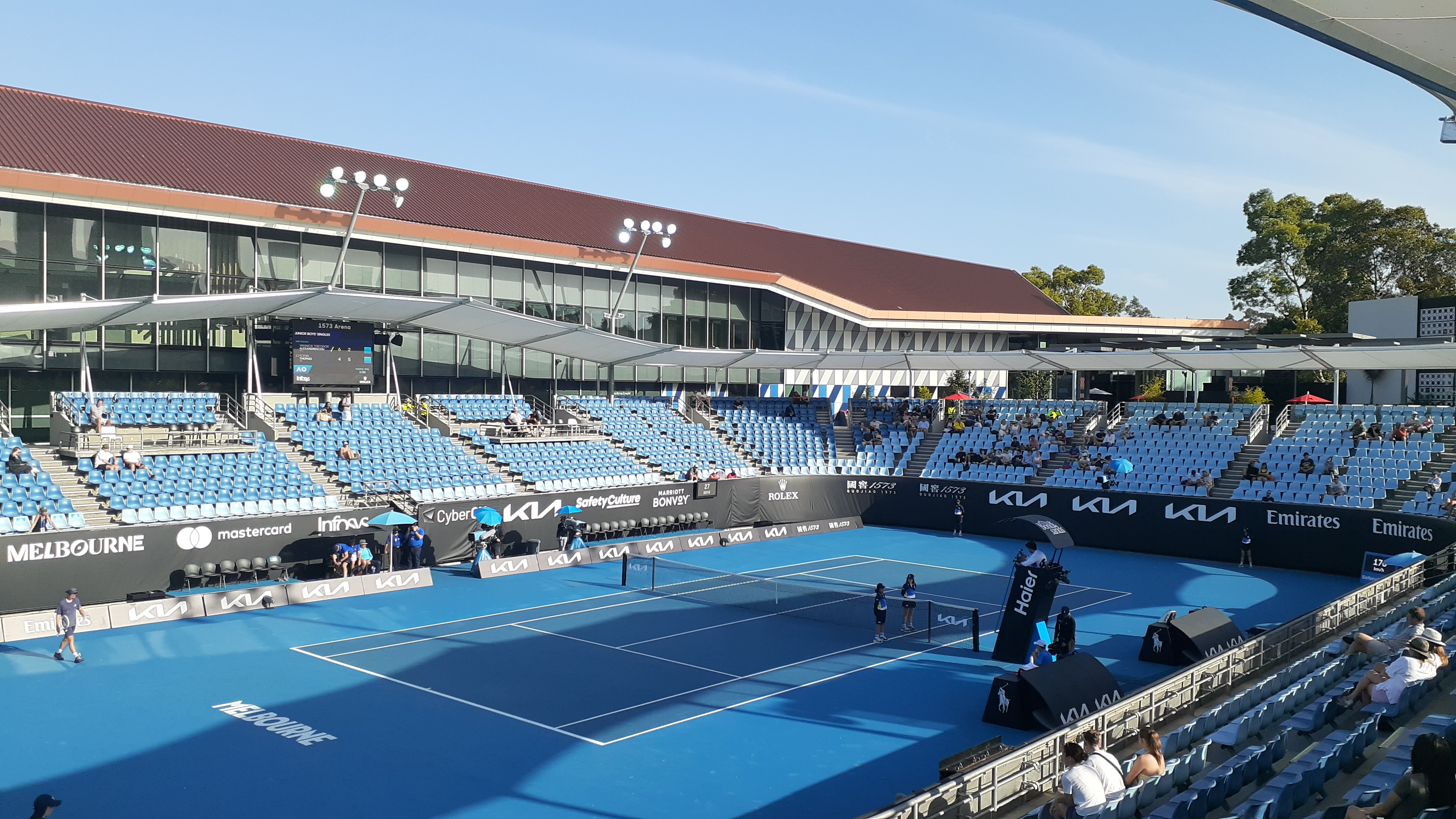
- 1573 Arena during the 2025 Australian Open - 21 January 2025
- Interactive map of Show Court 2
- Full name: Show Court 2 at Melbourne Park
- Location: Melbourne Park, MSEP, Melbourne, Victoria, Australia
- Coordinates: 37.820712°S 144.976965°E
- Owner: Government of Victoria
- Operator: Melbourne and Olympic Park Trust
- Capacity: 3,000
- Surface: GreenSet

Construction
- Built: 1987
- Opened: 1988

Tenant
- Australian Open

Show Court 2 (also known as 1573 Arena for sponsorship reasons) is the equal-fifth largest tennis court at Melbourne Park, in Melbourne, Australia, the venue of the Australian Open.

== Overview ==
Show Court 2 was constructed along with the rest of the original Melbourne Park precinct in 1987, debuting at the 1988 Australian Open. The court has always been available on a walk-up basis for spectators at the Australian Open with a ground pass. It is located to the immediate west of Margaret Court Arena. The court has no roof, but includes seating and shaded areas, and is usually heavily populated in the first week of the Australian Open for outside matches. For the 2019 Australian Open and onwards, it was renamed 1573 Arena for commercial purposes, after Chinese distillery Luzhou Laojiao, producer of a baijiu labelled Guojiao 1573, made a five-year sponsorship deal with Tennis Australia, which also featured corner signage on both Margaret Court and Rod Laver Arena. The deal is speculated to be almost as expensive as Kia's major partnership deal with the Australian Open. The court has a permanent capacity of 3,000 people.

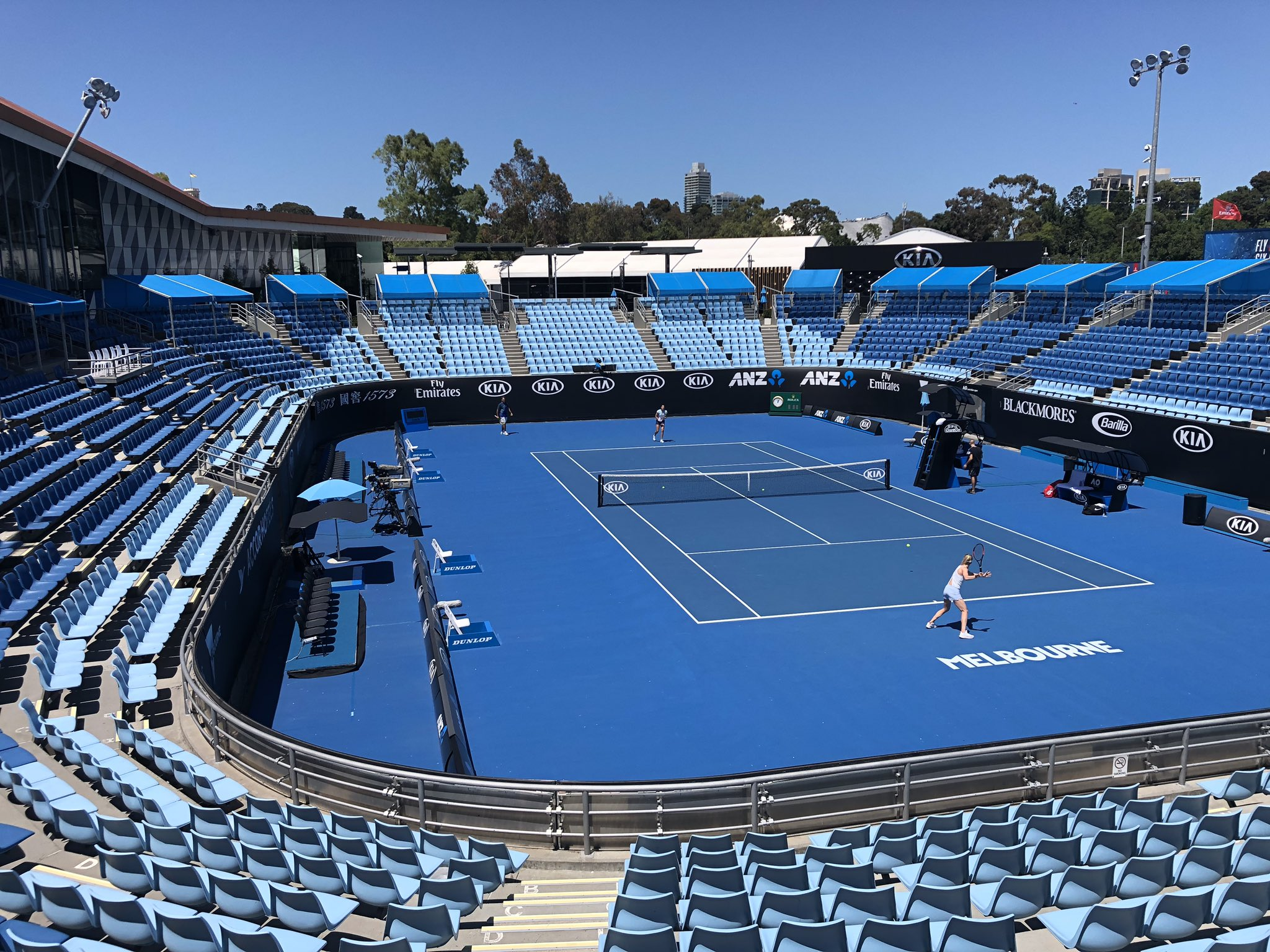
Players practicing on Show Court 2 in the lead-up to the 2020 Australian Open.

== See also ==
- List of tennis stadiums by capacity
- Court 3
