= Porrassa =

Porrassa may refer to:

- Illa de sa Porrassa, island off the coast of Majorca, Spain
- La Porrassa, farm town on Majorca, Spain
