= 2022 Australian Open – Men's singles =

Tennis championship

Men's singles
- 2022 Australian Open

Final
- Champion: (Spain) Rafael Nadal
- Runner-up: (Russia) Daniil Medvedev
- Score: 2–6, 6–7^{(5–7)}, 6–4, 6–4, 7–5

Details
- Draw: 128
- Seeds: 32

Events
Singles	men	women		boys	girls
Doubles	men	women	mixed	boys	girls
WC Singles	men	women	quad	boys	girls
WC Doubles	men	women	quad	boys	girls
- Australian Open

Rafael Nadal defeated Daniil Medvedev in the final, 2–6, 6–7^{(5–7)}, 6–4, 6–4, 7–5 to win the men's singles tennis title at the 2022 Australian Open. It was his second Australian Open title and 21st major singles title overall, surpassing the all-time record he had jointly held with Roger Federer and Novak Djokovic. Nadal became the fourth man, after Roy Emerson, Rod Laver, and Djokovic, to achieve the double career Grand Slam, and the second in the Open Era. He also became the first man in the Open Era to win the Australian Open final after losing the first two sets. This marked the third consecutive year a man trailed by two sets in a major final yet rallied to win, following Djokovic's two-set comeback at the 2021 French Open and Dominic Thiem's at the 2020 US Open. Nadal became the seventh man in the Open Era to come back from two sets down in a major final to win the title.

Djokovic was the three-time reigning champion, but did not compete after his visa was cancelled shortly before the tournament began due to an intervention from Australia's Immigration Minister Alex Hawke, citing risks to public health and good order in Australia. That meant Nadal was the only former champion (2009) to compete in the tournament, with both Federer and Stan Wawrinka sidelined by injury. Djokovic retained the world No. 1 singles ranking despite being unable to defend his points after Medvedev and Alexander Zverev lost in the final and fourth round, respectively.

Matteo Berrettini became the first man born in the 1990s to reach the quarterfinals at all four majors, and the first Italian man to reach the semifinals of the Australian Open.

This also marked Feliciano López’s 79th consecutive grand slam appearance, an Open Era record previously held by Roger Federer. López streak started at the 2002 French Open and concluded 20 years later in Melbourne.

== Seeds ==
1. (Serbia) Novak Djokovic (deported; replaced by Salvatore Caruso)
2. (Russia) Daniil Medvedev (final)
3. (Germany) Alexander Zverev (fourth round)
4. (Greece) Stefanos Tsitsipas (semifinals)
5. (Russia) Andrey Rublev (third round)
6. (Spain) Rafael Nadal (champion)
7. (Italy) Matteo Berrettini (semifinals)
8. (Norway) Casper Ruud (withdrew)
9. (Canada) Félix Auger-Aliassime (quarterfinals)
10. (Poland) Hubert Hurkacz (second round)
11. (Italy) Jannik Sinner (quarterfinals)
12. (United Kingdom) Cameron Norrie (first round)
13. (Argentina) Diego Schwartzman (second round)
14. (Canada) Denis Shapovalov (quarterfinals)
15. (Spain) Roberto Bautista Agut (third round)
16. (Chile) Cristian Garín (third round)

17. (France) Gaël Monfils (quarterfinals)
18. (Russia) Aslan Karatsev (third round)
19. (Spain) Pablo Carreño Busta (fourth round)
20. (United States) Taylor Fritz (fourth round)
21. (Georgia (country)) Nikoloz Basilashvili (first round)
22. (United States) John Isner (first round)
23. (United States) Reilly Opelka (third round)
24. (United Kingdom) Dan Evans (third round)
25. (Italy) Lorenzo Sonego (third round)
26. (Bulgaria) Grigor Dimitrov (second round)
27. (Croatia) Marin Čilić (fourth round)
28. (Russia) Karen Khachanov (third round)
29. (France) Ugo Humbert (first round)
30. (South Africa) Lloyd Harris (first round)
31. (Spain) Carlos Alcaraz (third round)
32. (Australia) Alex de Minaur (fourth round)

Click on the seed number of a player to go to their draw section.

== Draw ==
Key

- Q = Qualifier
- WC = Wild card
- LL = Lucky loser
- Alt = Alternate
- ITF = ITF entry
- PR = Protected ranking
- SR = Special ranking
- SE = Special exempt
- JE = Junior exempt
- JR = Junior Accelerator Programme entrant
- CO = College Accelerator Programme entrant
- NG = Next Gen Accelerator Program entrant
- w/o = Walkover
- r = Retired
- d = Defaulted

=== Finals ===
Quarterfinals
17	(France) Gaël Monfils	4	4	6	6	2
7	(Italy) Matteo Berrettini	6	6	3	3	6
14	(Canada) Denis Shapovalov	3	4	6	6	3
6	(Spain) Rafael Nadal	6	6	4	3	6
11	(Italy) Jannik Sinner	3	4	2
4	(Greece) Stefanos Tsitsipas	6	6	6
9	(Canada) Félix Auger-Aliassime	7^{7}	6	6^{2}	5	4
2	(Russia) Daniil Medvedev	6^{4}	3	7^{7}	7	6

Semifinals
7	(Italy) Matteo Berrettini	3	2	6	3
6	(Spain) Rafael Nadal	6	6	3	6
4	(Greece) Stefanos Tsitsipas	6^{5}	6	4	1
2	(Russia) Daniil Medvedev	7^{7}	4	6	6

Final
6	(Spain) Rafael Nadal	2	6^{5}	6	6	7
2	(Russia) Daniil Medvedev	6	7^{7}	4	4	5

=== Top half ===
==== Section 1 ====
First round
LL	(Italy) S Caruso	4	2	1
(Serbia) M Kecmanović	6	6	6
Q	(Kazakhstan) M Kukushkin	3	4	2
(United States) T Paul	6	6	6
(Germany) O Otte	6	6	6
WC	(Chinese Taipei) C-h Tseng	4	3	2
(United States) S Querrey	5	3	3
25	(Italy) L Sonego	7	6	6
17	(France) G Monfils	6	6	6
(Argentina) F Coria	1	1	3
(Kazakhstan) A Bublik	3	7^{7}	6	6
LL	(United States) E Escobedo	6	6^{5}	3	3
(Argentina) F Delbonis	6^{15}	6	4	2
(Spain) P Martínez	7^{17}	3	6	6
(Argentina) F Bagnis	3	4	7	7^{7}	3
16	(Chile) C Garín	6	6	5	6^{4}	6

Second round
(Serbia) M Kecmanović	7^{9}	7	7^{10}
(United States) T Paul	6^{7}	5	6^{8}
(Germany) O Otte	6	2	3	1
25	(Italy) L Sonego	2	6	6	6
17	(France) G Monfils	6	6	6
(Kazakhstan) A Bublik	1	0	4
(Spain) P Martínez	7^{7}	6^{4}	6	2	2
16	(Chile) C Garín	6^{1}	7^{7}	2	6	6

Third round
(Serbia) M Kecmanović	6	6^{8}	6	7
25	(Italy) L Sonego	4	7^{10}	2	5
17	(France) G Monfils	7^{7}	6	6
16	(Chile) C Garín	6^{4}	1	3

Fourth round
(Serbia) M Kecmanović	5	6^{4}	3
17	(France) G Monfils	7	7^{7}	6

==== Section 2 ====
First round
12	(United Kingdom) C Norrie	3	0	4
(United States) S Korda	6	6	6
(France) C Moutet	3	6	6	6
WC	(France) L Pouille	6	3	4	3
(Netherlands) T Griekspoor	6	6	6
(Italy) F Fognini	1	4	4
Q	(Argentina) TM Etcheverry	1	2	6^{2}
19	(Spain) P Carreño Busta	6	6	7^{7}
31	(Spain) C Alcaraz	6	6	6
Q	(Chile) A Tabilo	2	2	3
(Hungary) M Fucsovics	3	6	1	7^{8}	1
(Serbia) D Lajović	6	4	6	6^{6}	6
WC	(United States) S Kozlov	7	6	6
(Czech Republic) J Veselý	5	3	4
(United States) B Nakashima	6	2	6^{5}	3
7	(Italy) M Berrettini	4	6	7^{7}	6

Second round
(United States) S Korda	3	6	6^{2}	7	7^{10}
(France) C Moutet	6	4	7^{7}	5	6^{6}
(Netherlands) T Griekspoor	3	7^{8}	6^{3}	6	4
19	(Spain) P Carreño Busta	6	6^{6}	7^{7}	3	6
31	(Spain) C Alcaraz	6	6	7
(Serbia) D Lajović	2	1	5
WC	(United States) S Kozlov	1	6	4	1
7	(Italy) M Berrettini	6	4	6	6

Third round
(United States) S Korda	4	5	7^{8}	3
19	(Spain) P Carreño Busta	6	7	6^{6}	6
31	(Spain) C Alcaraz	2	6^{3}	6	6	6^{5}
7	(Italy) M Berrettini	6	7^{7}	4	2	7^{10}

Fourth round
19	(Spain) P Carreño Busta	5	6^{4}	4
7	(Italy) M Berrettini	7	7^{7}	6

==== Section 3 ====
First round
3	(Germany) A Zverev	7^{7}	6	7^{7}
(Germany) D Altmaier	6^{3}	1	6^{1}
(Spain) F López	1	3	6	5
(Australia) J Millman	6	6	4	7
Q	(Moldova) R Albot	6	6	4	6
(Japan) Y Nishioka	3	4	6	2
WC	(Australia) A Vukic	4	6	7	7^{7}
30	(South Africa) L Harris	6	3	5	6^{3}
23	(United States) R Opelka	6	6	7^{7}
(South Africa) K Anderson	3	4	6^{3}
(Germany) D Koepfer	6	3	6	6
(Spain) C Taberner	1	6	4	1
(Denmark) H Rune	6	4	6	3	2
(South Korea) S-w Kwon	3	6	3	6	6
(Serbia) L Djere	6^{3}	4	6	6^{3}
14	(Canada) D Shapovalov	7^{7}	6	3	7^{7}

Second round
3	(Germany) A Zverev	6	6	6
(Australia) J Millman	4	4	0
Q	(Moldova) R Albot	6	7^{7}	6
WC	(Australia) A Vukic	4	6^{4}	4
23	(United States) R Opelka	6	6	7^{7}
(Germany) D Koepfer	4	3	6^{4}
(South Korea) S-w Kwon	6^{6}	7^{7}	7^{8}	5	2
14	(Canada) D Shapovalov	7^{8}	6^{3}	6^{6}	7	6

Third round
3	(Germany) A Zverev	6	6	6
Q	(Moldova) R Albot	3	4	4
23	(United States) R Opelka	6^{4}	6	3	4
14	(Canada) D Shapovalov	7^{7}	4	6	6

Fourth round
3	(Germany) A Zverev	3	6^{5}	3
14	(Canada) D Shapovalov	6	7^{7}	6

==== Section 4 ====
First round
10	(Poland) H Hurkacz	6	7^{7}	6^{5}	6
(Belarus) E Gerasimov	2	6^{3}	7^{7}	3
(Australia) J Duckworth	4	6	6	2	1
(France) A Mannarino	6	2	3	6	6
Q	(Serbia) N Milojević	7	4	3	2
(United States) M McDonald	5	6	6	6
(Spain) J Munar	6	6^{1}	7^{7}	4	4
18	(Russia) A Karatsev	3	7^{7}	6^{3}	6	6
28	(Russia) K Khachanov	3	6	6	7^{7}
(United States) D Kudla	6	3	2	6^{2}
(France) B Bonzi	6	6	6
(Germany) P Gojowczyk	3	3	3
Q	(Germany) Y Hanfmann	6	6	6
WC	(Australia) T Kokkinakis	2	3	2
(United States) M Giron	1	4	2
6	(Spain) R Nadal	6	6	6

Second round
10	(Poland) H Hurkacz	4	2	3
(France) A Mannarino	6	6	6
(United States) M McDonald	6	2	2	3
18	(Russia) A Karatsev	3	6	6	6
28	(Russia) K Khachanov	6	6	7
(France) B Bonzi	4	0	5
Q	(Germany) Y Hanfmann	2	3	4
6	(Spain) R Nadal	6	6	6

Third round
(France) A Mannarino	7^{7}	6^{4}	7	6
18	(Russia) A Karatsev	6^{4}	7^{7}	5	4
28	(Russia) K Khachanov	3	2	6	1
6	(Spain) R Nadal	6	6	3	6

Fourth round
(France) A Mannarino	6^{14}	2	2
6	(Spain) R Nadal	7^{16}	6	6

=== Bottom half ===
==== Section 5 ====
First round
LL	(Russia) R Safiullin	3	6^{9}	7	6^{6}
(Slovakia) A Molčan	6	7^{11}	5	7^{8}
LL	(Bosnia and Herzegovina) D Džumhur	1	5	1
(Spain) P Andújar	6	7	6
(Italy) A Seppi	1	1	5
(Poland) K Majchrzak	6	6	7
(Italy) L Musetti	6	3	0	3
32	(Australia) A de Minaur	3	6	6	6
21	(Georgia (country)) N Basilashvili	1	6	4	7^{7}	4
WC	(United Kingdom) A Murray	6	3	6	6^{5}	6
Q	(Japan) T Daniel	7^{7}	6	6
Q	(Chile) T Barrios Vera	6^{5}	1	1
(United States) S Johnson	7^{7}	6^{6}	4	6	6
(Australia) J Thompson	6^{5}	7^{8}	6	3	3
LL	(Portugal) J Sousa	4	5	1
11	(Italy) J Sinner	6	7	6

Second round
(Slovakia) A Molčan	4	6^{6}	6	1
(Spain) P Andújar	6	7^{8}	0	6
(Poland) K Majchrzak	4	4	2
32	(Australia) A de Minaur	6	6	6
WC	(United Kingdom) A Murray	4	4	4
Q	(Japan) T Daniel	6	6	6
(United States) S Johnson	2	4	3
11	(Italy) J Sinner	6	6	6

Third round
(Spain) P Andújar	4	4	2
32	(Australia) A de Minaur	6	6	6
Q	(Japan) T Daniel	4	6	3	1
11	(Italy) J Sinner	6	1	6	6

Fourth round
32	(Australia) A de Minaur	6^{3}	3	4
11	(Italy) J Sinner	7^{7}	6	6

==== Section 6 ====
First round
15	(Spain) R Bautista Agut	7^{7}	6	5	6
(Italy) S Travaglia	6^{2}	4	7	1
(Germany) P Kohlschreiber	6	7	7^{7}
(Italy) M Cecchinato	4	5	6^{0}
(United States) F Tiafoe	3	6	6	3	6
Q	(Argentina) M Trungelliti	6	4	2	6	3
Q	(Germany) M Marterer	6^{8}	3	2
20	(United States) T Fritz	7^{10}	6	6
26	(Bulgaria) G Dimitrov	6	4	6	7
Q	(Czech Republic) J Lehečka	4	6	3	5
(France) B Paire	6	3	7	2	7
(Brazil) T Monteiro	4	6	5	6	5
(Argentina) S Báez	6	4	6	1	6
(Spain) A Ramos Viñolas	4	6	3	6	2
(Sweden) M Ymer	2	4	3
4	(Greece) S Tsitsipas	6	6	6

Second round
15	(Spain) R Bautista Agut	6	6	6
(Germany) P Kohlschreiber	1	0	3
(United States) F Tiafoe	4	3	6^{5}
20	(United States) T Fritz	6	6	7^{7}
26	(Bulgaria) G Dimitrov	4	4	7^{7}	6^{2}
(France) B Paire	6	6	6^{4}	7^{7}
(Argentina) S Báez	6^{1}	7^{7}	3	4
4	(Greece) S Tsitsipas	7^{7}	6^{5}	6	6

Third round
15	(Spain) R Bautista Agut	0	6	6	4	3
20	(United States) T Fritz	6	3	3	6	6
(France) B Paire	3	5	7^{7}	4
4	(Greece) S Tsitsipas	6	7	6^{2}	6

Fourth round
20	(United States) T Fritz	6	4	6	3	4
4	(Greece) S Tsitsipas	4	6	4	6	6

==== Section 7 ====
First round
5	(Russia) A Rublev	6	6	6
(Italy) G Mager	3	2	2
(Spain) R Carballés Baena	1	6	6	3	4
(Lithuania) R Berankis	6	3	2	6	6
Q	(Kazakhstan) T Skatov	3	2	6	4
Q	(Slovakia) N Gombos	6	6	1	6
Q	(Ecuador) E Gómez	3	1	2
27	(Croatia) M Čilić	6	6	6
24	(United Kingdom) D Evans	6	6	6
(Belgium) D Goffin	4	3	0
(Australia) A Popyrin	5	6	2	6	3
(France) A Rinderknech	7	4	6	3	6
(Spain) A Davidovich Fokina	6	6	6
WC	(Australia) A Bolt	3	3	4
(Finland) E Ruusuvuori	4	6	6	3	4
9	(Canada) F Auger-Aliassime	6	0	3	6	6

Second round
5	(Russia) A Rublev	6	6	6
(Lithuania) R Berankis	4	2	0
Q	(Slovakia) N Gombos	2	3	6	6^{6}
27	(Croatia) M Čilić	6	6	3	7^{8}
24	(United Kingdom) D Evans	w/o
(France) A Rinderknech
(Spain) A Davidovich Fokina	6^{4}	7^{7}	6^{5}	6^{4}
9	(Canada) F Auger-Aliassime	7^{7}	6^{4}	7^{7}	7^{7}

Third round
5	(Russia) A Rublev	5	6^{3}	6	3
27	(Croatia) M Čilić	7	7^{7}	3	6
24	(United Kingdom) D Evans	4	1	1
9	(Canada) F Auger-Aliassime	6	6	6

Fourth round
27	(Croatia) M Čilić	6	6^{7}	2	6^{4}
9	(Canada) F Auger-Aliassime	2	7^{9}	6	7^{7}

==== Section 8 ====
First round
13	(Argentina) D Schwartzman	6	6	7
(Serbia) F Krajinović	3	4	5
WC	(Australia) C O'Connell	7^{7}	6	4	6
(France) H Gaston	6^{4}	0	6	1
Q	(Czech Republic) T Macháč	6	2	6	6
(Argentina) JM Cerúndolo	3	6	4	2
(United States) M Cressy	7^{7}	7	6^{4}	6^{4}	6
22	(United States) J Isner	6^{2}	5	7^{7}	7^{7}	4
29	(France) U Humbert	6	6^{4}	6^{3}	3
(France) R Gasquet	3	7^{7}	7^{7}	6
(Netherlands) B van de Zandschulp	6	6	6
(Germany) J-L Struff	4	3	2
Q	(United Kingdom) L Broady	4	4	3
(Australia) N Kyrgios	6	6	6
(Switzerland) H Laaksonen	1	4	6^{3}
2	(Russia) D Medvedev	6	6	7^{7}

Second round
13	(Argentina) D Schwartzman	6^{6}	4	4
WC	(Australia) C O'Connell	7^{8}	6	6
Q	(Czech Republic) T Macháč	1	6	1	6^{5}
(United States) M Cressy	6	3	6	7^{7}
(France) R Gasquet	6	0	0^{r}
(Netherlands) B van de Zandschulp	4	6	4
(Australia) N Kyrgios	6^{1}	4	6	2
2	(Russia) D Medvedev	7^{7}	6	4	6

Third round
WC	(Australia) C O'Connell	2	7^{8}	3	2
(United States) M Cressy	6	6^{6}	6	6
(Netherlands) B van de Zandschulp	4	4	2
2	(Russia) D Medvedev	6	6	6

Fourth round
(United States) M Cressy	2	6^{4}	7^{7}	5
2	(Russia) D Medvedev	6	7^{7}	6^{4}	7

== Seeded players ==
The following are the seeded players. Seedings are based on ATP rankings as of 10 January 2022. Rank and points before are as of 17 January 2022.

As a result of pandemic-related adjustments to the ranking system and changes to the ATP Tour calendar in 2020 and 2021, ranking points after the tournament (as of 31 January 2022) were calculated as follows:

- Players who were defending points from the 2020 tournament (i.e. players whose 2020 results exceeded or were equal to their 2021 results) had their 2020 points replaced by points from the 2022 tournament; as of 31 January 2022, these players could also count their 2021 points towards their ranking if the 2021 points exceeded their 19th best result (in other words, points from the 2021 and 2022 tournaments could be counted simultaneously instead of under the previous "better of" system)
- Players who were defending points from the 2021 tournament (i.e. players whose 2021 points exceeded their 2020 points) had their 19th best result replaced by their points from the 2022 tournament; these players continued to count their 2021 points alongside their 2022 points at the end of the tournament because the 2021 tournament was delayed by three weeks compared to the normal schedule and the "better of" logic for calculating ATP ranking points had been discontinued
- All players who have points from the 2021 tournament still counting towards their ranking on 31 January 2022 will have those points dropped on 21 February 2022 (52 weeks after the 2021 tournament) and replaced by their next best result

Note that this is a different ranking adjustment system than the one being used by the WTA for the women's event.

Seed	Rank	Player	Points before	2020 points (and/or 19th best result)	Points won	Points after	Status
~~1~~	~~1~~	~~(Serbia) Novak Djokovic~~	11,015	2,000+0	0+2,000	11,015^{†}	Unable to compete due to visa cancellation and deportation
2	2	(Russia) Daniil Medvedev	8,935	(10)	1,200	10,125	Runner-up, lost to (Spain) Rafael Nadal [6]
3	3	(Germany) Alexander Zverev	7,970	720+10	180+360	7,780^{†}	Fourth round lost to (Canada) Denis Shapovalov [14]
4	4	(Greece) Stefanos Tsitsipas	6,540	(90)	720	7,170	Semifinals lost to (Russia) Daniil Medvedev [2]
5	6	(Russia) Andrey Rublev	4,785	(45)	90	4,830	Third round lost to (Croatia) Marin Čilić [27]
6	5	(Spain) Rafael Nadal	4,875	(0)	2,000	6,875	Champion, defeated (Russia) Daniil Medvedev [2]
7	7	(Italy) Matteo Berrettini	4,568	(10)	720	5,278	Semifinals lost to (Spain) Rafael Nadal [6]
~~8~~	~~8~~	~~(Norway) Casper Ruud~~	4,155	(90)	0	4,065	Withdrew due to ankle injury
9	9	(Canada) Félix Auger-Aliassime	3,608	(45)	360	3,923	Quarterfinals lost to (Russia) Daniil Medvedev [2]
10	11	(Poland) Hubert Hurkacz	3,336	45	45	3,336	Second round lost to (France) Adrian Mannarino
11	10	(Italy) Jannik Sinner	3,390	45	360	3,705	Quarterfinals lost to (Greece) Stefanos Tsitsipas [4]
12	12	(United Kingdom) Cameron Norrie	2,900	(45)	10	2,865	First round lost to (United States) Sebastian Korda
13	13	(Argentina) Diego Schwartzman	2,730	180+45	45+90	2,640^{†}	Second round lost to (Australia) Christopher O'Connell (WC)
14	14	(Canada) Denis Shapovalov	2,593	(23)	360	2,930	Quarterfinals lost to (Spain) Rafael Nadal [6]
15	18	(Spain) Roberto Bautista Agut	2,385	90	90	2,385	Third round lost to (United States) Taylor Fritz [20]
16	19	(Chile) Cristian Garín	2,375	45	90	2,420	Third round lost to (France) Gaël Monfils [17]
17	20	(France) Gaël Monfils	2,373	180	360	2,553	Quarterfinals lost to (Italy) Matteo Berrettini [7]
18	15	(Russia) Aslan Karatsev	2,553	(10)	90	2,633	Third round lost to (France) Adrian Mannarino
19	21	(Spain) Pablo Carreño Busta	2,305	90+10	180+90	2,475^{†}	Fourth round lost to (Italy) Matteo Berrettini [7]
20	22	(United States) Taylor Fritz	2,175	90+45	180+90	2,310^{†}	Fourth round lost to (Greece) Stefanos Tsitsipas [4]
21	23	(Georgia (country)) Nikoloz Basilashvili	2,051	45	10	2,016	First round lost to (United Kingdom) Andy Murray (WC)
22	25	(United States) John Isner	1,881	90	10	1,801	First round lost to (United States) Maxime Cressy
23	29	(United States) Reilly Opelka	1,776	(0)	90	1,866	Third round lost to (Canada) Denis Shapovalov [14]
24	24	(United Kingdom) Dan Evans	1,957	45	90	2,002	Third round lost to (Canada) Félix Auger-Aliassime [9]
25	26	(Italy) Lorenzo Sonego	1,860	(13)	90	1,937	Third round lost to (Serbia) Miomir Kecmanović
26	28	(Bulgaria) Grigor Dimitrov	1,821	90+10	45+90	1,856^{†}	Second round lost to (France) Benoît Paire
27	27	(Croatia) Marin Čilić	1,840	180	180	1,840	Fourth round lost to (Canada) Félix Auger-Aliassime [9]
28	30	(Russia) Karen Khachanov	1,748	90+23	90+90	1,815^{†}	Third round lost to (Spain) Rafael Nadal [6]
29	40	(France) Ugo Humbert	1,318	(10)	10	1,318	First round lost to (France) Richard Gasquet
30	33	(South Africa) Lloyd Harris	1,473	(6)	10	1,477	First round lost to (Australia) Aleksandar Vukic (WC)
31	31	(Spain) Carlos Alcaraz	1,609	(10)^{§}	90	1,689	Third round lost to (Italy) Matteo Berrettini [7]
32	42	(Australia) Alex de Minaur	1,316	(10)	180	1,486	Fourth round lost to (Italy) Jannik Sinner [11]

† The player's 2020 points were replaced by his 2022 points, and his 19th best result was replaced by his 2021 points. The 2021 points will be dropped three weeks after the end of the 2022 tournament.
§ The player was defending points from a 2020 ITF tournament.

=== Withdrawn players ===
The following players would have been seeded, but withdrew before the tournament began.

Rank	Player	Points before	2020 points	2021 points	Points lost	Points after	Withdrawal reason
16	(Austria) Dominic Thiem	2,410	1,200	180	1,020	1,390^{†}	Wrist injury
17	(Switzerland) Roger Federer	2,385	720	0	720	1,665	Right knee surgery

== Djokovic visa controversy ==
Djokovic lost his ability to compete when his visa to enter Australia was cancelled. Despite being granted a medical exemption to the tournament's COVID-19 vaccine requirement by Tennis Australia, the Australian Border Force confirmed that after being detained at Melbourne Airport for eight hours, Djokovic's visa had been cancelled and he would be denied entry to the country due to not meeting exemption criteria to Australia's vaccination requirements. Djokovic sought an injunction to prevent his deportation. The Federal Circuit and Family Court ruled in favour of Djokovic, ordered his release from detention and directed the federal government to pay his legal expenses. On 14 January Minister for Immigration Alex Hawke used his discretionary power under sections 133C(3) and 116(1)(e)(i) of the Migration Act 1958 to cancel Djokovic's visa on health and good order grounds. Djokovic sought a judicial review against deportation, but three Federal Court of Australia judges unanimously rejected the review on 16 January, preventing him from defending his title.

== Other entry information ==
=== Wildcards ===
- (Australia) Alex Bolt
- (Australia) Thanasi Kokkinakis
- (United States) Stefan Kozlov
- (United Kingdom) Andy Murray
- (Australia) Christopher O'Connell
- (France) Lucas Pouille
- (Chinese Taipei) Tseng Chun-hsin
- (Australia) Aleksandar Vukic

=== Qualifiers ===
- (Moldova) Radu Albot
- (Chile) Tomás Barrios Vera
- (United Kingdom) Liam Broady
- (Japan) Taro Daniel
- (Argentina) Tomás Martín Etcheverry
- (Slovakia) Norbert Gombos
- (Ecuador) Emilio Gómez
- (Germany) Yannick Hanfmann
- (Kazakhstan) Mikhail Kukushkin
- (Czech Republic) Jiří Lehečka
- (Czech Republic) Tomáš Macháč
- (Germany) Maximilian Marterer
- (Serbia) Nikola Milojević
- (Kazakhstan) Timofey Skatov
- (Chile) Alejandro Tabilo
- (Argentina) Marco Trungelliti

=== Lucky losers ===
- (Italy) Salvatore Caruso
- (Bosnia and Herzegovina) Damir Džumhur
- (United States) Ernesto Escobedo
- (Russia) Roman Safiullin
- (Portugal) João Sousa

=== Withdrawals ===
- ‡ (Canada) Milos Raonic (70) → replaced by (Spain) Carlos Taberner (111)
- ‡ (Austria) Dominic Thiem (15) → replaced by (United States) Maxime Cressy (112)
- ‡ (United States) Tennys Sandgren (96) → replaced by (Belarus) Egor Gerasimov (113)
- ‡ (Japan) Kei Nishikori (47) → replaced by (Germany) Philipp Kohlschreiber (114)
- ‡ (United States) Jenson Brooksby (56) → replaced by (Poland) Kamil Majchrzak (115) (Note: Last direct acceptance)
- † (Croatia) Borna Ćorić (73) → replaced by (Portugal) João Sousa (LL)
- § (Uruguay) Pablo Cuevas (98) → replaced by (United States) Ernesto Escobedo (LL)
- § (Serbia) Novak Djokovic (1) → replaced by (Italy) Salvatore Caruso (LL)
- § (Belarus) Ilya Ivashka (48) → replaced by (Bosnia and Herzegovina) Damir Džumhur (LL)
- § (Norway) Casper Ruud (8) → replaced by (Russia) Roman Safiullin (LL)

‡ – withdrew from entry list before qualifying began
† – withdrew from entry list after qualifying began
§ – withdrew from main draw

== See also ==
- 2022 ATP Tour
- 2022 French Open – Men's singles
- 2022 Wimbledon Championships – Men's singles
- 2022 US Open – Men's singles
- List of Grand Slam men's singles champions

== Notes ==
Preceded by 2021 US Open – Men's singles	Grand Slam men's singles	Succeeded by 2022 French Open – Men's singles
