= Palmanova beach =

Beach in Mallorca, Spain

Coordinates: 39.519°N 2.537°E

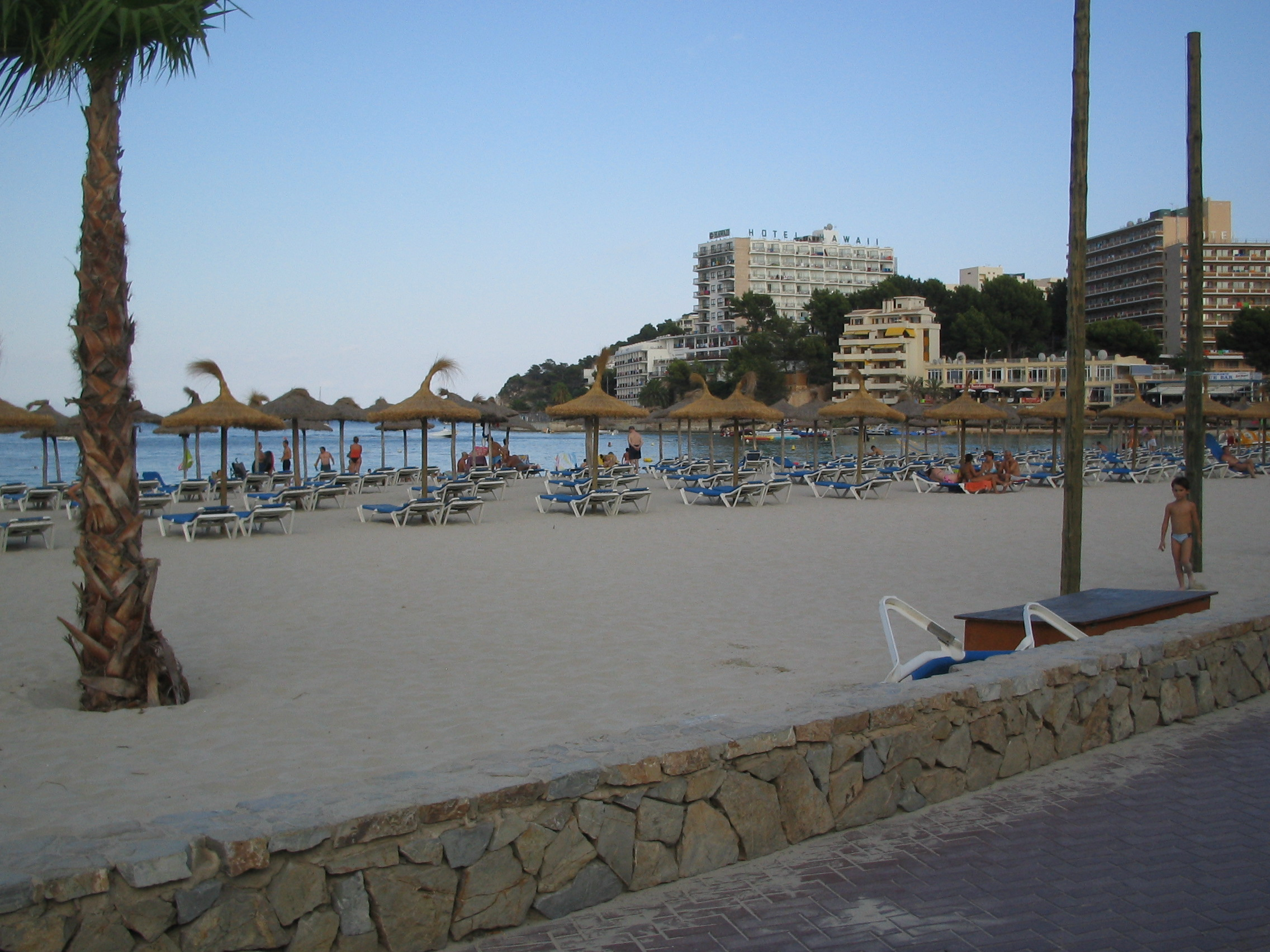
Palmanova Beach

Palmanova Beach is a beach on Mallorca, one of the Balearic Islands, Spain. It is located 7 kilometres (4.3 mi) from Calvià, between Punta Nadala and es Carregador. Besides Palmanova Beach, other names by which the beach is known include Playa de Palma Nova, and Platja de Palma Nova. The Palma Nova sea front has three beaches: Torrenova, Es Carregador, and Palma Nova. The beach has had an extension of 500 meters (1,600 ft) and has needed an artificial regeneration to achieve the current aspect of fine and white sand, as well as its dimensions.

== History ==
Development started in 1935, at which time the name Són Caliu pel de Palma Nova was replaced. Initial tourist urbanization took place on the grounds of finca de Ses Planes. The Spanish Civil War and the isolation of the country, until the late 1950s, interrupted the process. The first hotels were l'Hotel Platja (1957) and l'Hotel Morocco (1959).

== Bibliography ==
- "Palmanova". Playasycosta.com.
- "Platja de Palmanova | Mallorca | Strand-Inspirator™ | Expedia.de". Strand-inspirator.expedia.de. Archived from the original on 2011-08-29.
- "Platja De Palmanova Bandera Blava Calvià Mallorca Balears Espany". Baleareslive.com.
