= 2020 ITF Men's World Tennis Tour (January–March) =

The 2020 ITF Men's World Tennis Tour is the 2020 edition of the second-tier tour for men's professional tennis. It is organised by the International Tennis Federation and is a tier below the ATP Tour. The ITF Men's World Tennis Tour includes tournaments with prize money ranging from $15,000 to $25,000.

== Key ==
M25 tournaments
M15 tournaments

== Month ==
=== January ===
Week of	Tournament	Winner	Runners-up	Semifinalists	Quarterfinalists
January 6	Los Angeles, United States; Hard; M25; Singles and Doubles Draws	(Argentina) Francisco Cerúndolo; 6–3, 6–3	(United States) Alexander Ritschard	(United States) Emilio Nava (United States) Brandon Holt	(Sweden) Christian Lindell (United States) Raymond Sarmiento (United States) Collin Altamirano (France) Geoffrey Blancaneaux
January 6	Los Angeles, United States; Hard; M25; Singles and Doubles Draws	(Israel) Daniel Cukierman (United States) Riley Smith; 7–6^{(7–4)}, 7–6^{(7–5)}	(Switzerland) Sandro Ehrat (United States) Brandon Holt	(United States) Emilio Nava (United States) Brandon Holt	(Sweden) Christian Lindell (United States) Raymond Sarmiento (United States) Collin Altamirano (France) Geoffrey Blancaneaux
January 6	Hong Kong; Hard; M15; Singles and Doubles Draws	(Japan) Yuta Shimizu; 5–7, 7–6^{(9–7)}, 7–6^{(7–5)}	(Chinese Taipei) Hsu Yu-hsiou	(Japan) Naoki Nakagawa (Belgium) Arthur De Greef	(Chinese Taipei) Meng Cing-yang (Japan) Makoto Ochi (Thailand) Kasidit Samrej (United States) Adam El Mihdawy
January 6	Hong Kong; Hard; M15; Singles and Doubles Draws	(Switzerland) Luca Castelnuovo (Chinese Taipei) Hsu Yu-hsiou; 5–7, 6–3, [11–9]	(Chinese Taipei) Lin Wei-de (Thailand) Wishaya Trongcharoenchaikul	(Japan) Naoki Nakagawa (Belgium) Arthur De Greef	(Chinese Taipei) Meng Cing-yang (Japan) Makoto Ochi (Thailand) Kasidit Samrej (United States) Adam El Mihdawy
January 6	Manacor, Spain; Hard; M15; Singles and Doubles Draws	(Spain) Carlos Alcaraz; 6–0, 6–2	(France) Evan Furness	(Spain) Álvaro López San Martín (Spain) Alberto Barroso Campos	(Czech Republic) Jonáš Forejtek (France) Kenny de Schepper (Poland) Paweł Ciaś (Finland) Patrik Niklas-Salminen
January 6	Manacor, Spain; Hard; M15; Singles and Doubles Draws	(United Kingdom) Jonathan Binding (United Kingdom) Evan Hoyt; 6–3, 6–4	(Republic of Ireland) Peter Bothwell (United Kingdom) Jonathan Gray	(Spain) Álvaro López San Martín (Spain) Alberto Barroso Campos	(Czech Republic) Jonáš Forejtek (France) Kenny de Schepper (Poland) Paweł Ciaś (Finland) Patrik Niklas-Salminen
January 6	Monastir, Tunisia; Hard; M15; Singles and Doubles Draws	(Monaco) Lucas Catarina; 4–6, 6–3, 6–3	(Russia) Boris Pokotilov	(France) Thomas Laurent (France) Clément Tabur	(Russia) Ivan Gakhov (Czech Republic) Marek Gengel (Bosnia and Herzegovina) Aldin Šetkić (Turkey) Aziz Dougaz
January 6	Monastir, Tunisia; Hard; M15; Singles and Doubles Draws	(United Kingdom) Luke Johnson (France) Hugo Voljacques; 6–3, 6–2	(Czech Republic) Marek Gengel (Czech Republic) Dominik Langmajer	(France) Thomas Laurent (France) Clément Tabur	(Russia) Ivan Gakhov (Czech Republic) Marek Gengel (Bosnia and Herzegovina) Aldin Šetkić (Turkey) Aziz Dougaz
January 6	Antalya, Turkey; Clay; M15; Singles and Doubles Draws	(Spain) Javier Barranco Cosano; 6–4, 6–1	(Italy) Marco Bortolotti	(Italy) Fabrizio Ornago (Sweden) Dragoș Nicolae Mădăraș	(Russia) Andrey Chepelev (Spain) Albert Roglan (Romania) Filip Cristian Jianu (France) Gianni Mina
January 6	Antalya, Turkey; Clay; M15; Singles and Doubles Draws	(Italy) Riccardo Bonadio (Italy) Marco Bortolotti; 6–3, 6–2	(Romania) Vasile Antonescu (Romania) Dan Alexandru Tomescu	(Italy) Fabrizio Ornago (Sweden) Dragoș Nicolae Mădăraș	(Russia) Andrey Chepelev (Spain) Albert Roglan (Romania) Filip Cristian Jianu (France) Gianni Mina
January 13	Rancho Santa Fe, United States; Hard; M25; Singles and Doubles Draws	(United States) Brandon Nakashima; 6–3, 6–3	(France) Geoffrey Blancaneaux	(United States) Ulises Blanch (Switzerland) Sandro Ehrat	(United States) Michael Redlicki (United States) Emilio Nava (United States) Collin Altamirano (United States) Alexander Ritschard
January 13	Rancho Santa Fe, United States; Hard; M25; Singles and Doubles Draws	(United Kingdom) Lloyd Glasspool (United States) Alex Lawson; 6–1, 7–6^{(7–1)}	(Bolivia) Boris Arias (United States) Sekou Bangoura	(United States) Ulises Blanch (Switzerland) Sandro Ehrat	(United States) Michael Redlicki (United States) Emilio Nava (United States) Collin Altamirano (United States) Alexander Ritschard
January 13	Cairo, Egypt; Clay; M15; Singles and Doubles Draws	(Spain) Javier Martí; 6–2, 2–6, 7–6^{(7–5)}	(Spain) Nikolás Sánchez Izquierdo	(Italy) Fabrizio Ornago (Italy) Daniele Capecchi	(Russia) Andrey Chepelev (Russia) Dimitriy Voronin (Egypt) Faris Zakaryia (Czech Republic) Petr Hájek
January 13	Cairo, Egypt; Clay; M15; Singles and Doubles Draws	(Croatia) Duje Kekez (Hungary) Gergely Madarász; 6–1, 6–2	(Germany) Luca Gelhardt (Czech Republic) Petr Hájek	(Italy) Fabrizio Ornago (Italy) Daniele Capecchi	(Russia) Andrey Chepelev (Russia) Dimitriy Voronin (Egypt) Faris Zakaryia (Czech Republic) Petr Hájek
January 13	Bagnoles-de-l'Orne, France; Clay (indoor); M15+H; Singles and Doubles Draws	(France) Jules Marie; 6–3, 6–4	(France) Matteo Martineau	(France) Jurgen Briand (France) Quentin Folliot	(Sweden) Markus Eriksson (France) Gleb Sakharov (France) Hugo Pierre (United Kingdom) Anton Matusevich
January 13	Bagnoles-de-l'Orne, France; Clay (indoor); M15+H; Singles and Doubles Draws	(Belgium) Benjamin D'Hoe (France) Arthur Reymond; 1–6, 6–2, [10–8]	(France) Titouan Droguet (France) Hugo Pierre	(France) Jurgen Briand (France) Quentin Folliot	(Sweden) Markus Eriksson (France) Gleb Sakharov (France) Hugo Pierre (United Kingdom) Anton Matusevich
January 13	Cancún, Mexico; Hard; M15; Singles and Doubles Draws	(Italy) Alessandro Bega; 6–4, 6–2	(Brazil) Mateus Alves	(Australia) Brandon Walkin (Argentina) Genaro Alberto Olivieri	(United Kingdom) David Fox (United States) Tanner Smith (Bolivia) Rodrigo Banzer (Argentina) Francisco Comesaña
January 13	Cancún, Mexico; Hard; M15; Singles and Doubles Draws	(Argentina) Nicolás Alberto Arreche (Spain) David Pérez Sanz; 7–6^{(9–7)}, 6–1	(Canada) Juan Carlos Aguilar (United States) Tanner Smith	(Australia) Brandon Walkin (Argentina) Genaro Alberto Olivieri	(United Kingdom) David Fox (United States) Tanner Smith (Bolivia) Rodrigo Banzer (Argentina) Francisco Comesaña
January 13	Manacor, Spain; Hard; M15; Singles and Doubles Draws	(Spain) Carlos Alcaraz; 6–3, 6–4	(France) Evan Furness	(Portugal) João Monteiro (Jordan) Abedallah Shelbayh	(United Kingdom) Evan Hoyt (France) Baptiste Crepatte (Czech Republic) Michael Vrbenský (France) Benjamin Pietri
January 13	Manacor, Spain; Hard; M15; Singles and Doubles Draws	(Germany) Johannes Härteis (Germany) Peter Heller; 6–7^{(5–7)}, 6–1, [10–3]	(Spain) Carlos Sánchez Jover (Spain) Pedro Vives Marcos	(Portugal) João Monteiro (Jordan) Abedallah Shelbayh	(United Kingdom) Evan Hoyt (France) Baptiste Crepatte (Czech Republic) Michael Vrbenský (France) Benjamin Pietri
January 13	Monastir, Tunisia; Hard; M15; Singles and Doubles Draws	(France) Antoine Escoffier; 6–2, 6–0	(France) Thomas Laurent	(Netherlands) Jesper de Jong (France) Clément Tabur	(Tunisia) Skander Mansouri (France) Jules Okala (Italy) Matteo Arnaldi (Tunisia) Majed Kilani
January 13	Monastir, Tunisia; Hard; M15; Singles and Doubles Draws	(Netherlands) Jesper de Jong (Netherlands) Bart Stevens; 6–4, 3–6, [10–8]	(United Kingdom) Luke Johnson (France) Hugo Voljacques	(Netherlands) Jesper de Jong (France) Clément Tabur	(Tunisia) Skander Mansouri (France) Jules Okala (Italy) Matteo Arnaldi (Tunisia) Majed Kilani
January 13	Antalya, Turkey; Clay; M15; Singles and Doubles Draws	(Spain) Javier Barranco Cosano; 6–4, 2–6, 6–1	(Belgium) Julien Cagnina	(Italy) Davide Galoppini (Romania) Dan Alexandru Tomescu	(Italy) Marco Bortolotti (Romania) Filip Cristian Jianu (Switzerland) Johan Nikles (Kazakhstan) Timofei Skatov
January 13	Antalya, Turkey; Clay; M15; Singles and Doubles Draws	(Turkey) Umut Akkoyun (Belgium) Julien Cagnina; 6–3, 6–4	(Italy) Alessandro Petrone (Italy) Luca Prevosto	(Italy) Davide Galoppini (Romania) Dan Alexandru Tomescu	(Italy) Marco Bortolotti (Romania) Filip Cristian Jianu (Switzerland) Johan Nikles (Kazakhstan) Timofei Skatov
January 20	Nußloch, Germany; Carpet (indoor); M25; Singles and Doubles Draws	(Belgium) Ruben Bemelmans; 6–7^{(4–7)}, 7–6^{(7–3)}, 6–2	(Czech Republic) Jonáš Forejtek	(Germany) Elmar Ejupovic (Italy) Julian Ocleppo	(France) Matteo Martineau (Germany) Stefan Seifert (Czech Republic) Jan Šátral (Germany) Johannes Härteis
January 20	Nußloch, Germany; Carpet (indoor); M25; Singles and Doubles Draws	(Poland) Jan Zieliński (Poland) Kacper Żuk; 6–3, 6–4	(Germany) Johannes Härteis (Germany) Peter Heller	(Germany) Elmar Ejupovic (Italy) Julian Ocleppo	(France) Matteo Martineau (Germany) Stefan Seifert (Czech Republic) Jan Šátral (Germany) Johannes Härteis
January 20	Cairo, Egypt; Clay; M15; Singles and Doubles Draws	(Spain) Nikolás Sánchez Izquierdo; 7–6^{(7–4)}, 7–6^{(7–3)}	(France) Matthieu Perchicot	(Argentina) Juan Pablo Paz (Italy) Fabrizio Ornago	(Italy) Marco Furlanetto (Belgium) Benjamin D'Hoe (Russia) Dimitriy Voronin (Ukraine) Yurii Dzhavakian
January 20	Cairo, Egypt; Clay; M15; Singles and Doubles Draws	(Argentina) Juan Pablo Paz (Argentina) Fermin Tenti; 6–0, 6–1	(Russia) Alexander Shevchenko (Ukraine) Eric Vanshelboim	(Argentina) Juan Pablo Paz (Italy) Fabrizio Ornago	(Italy) Marco Furlanetto (Belgium) Benjamin D'Hoe (Russia) Dimitriy Voronin (Ukraine) Yurii Dzhavakian
January 20	Bressuire, France; Hard (indoor); M15+H; Singles and Doubles Draws	(Switzerland) Antoine Bellier; 6–4, 6–3	(France) Quentin Robert	(France) Lucas Poullain (Poland) Wojciech Marek	(United Kingdom) Anton Matusevich (France) Hugo Pontico (France) Kenny de Schepper (France) Ugo Blanchet
January 20	Bressuire, France; Hard (indoor); M15+H; Singles and Doubles Draws	(France) Lucas Poullain (France) Clément Tabur; 7–5, 4–6, [10–6]	(Poland) Wojciech Marek (Sweden) Christian Samuelsson	(France) Lucas Poullain (Poland) Wojciech Marek	(United Kingdom) Anton Matusevich (France) Hugo Pontico (France) Kenny de Schepper (France) Ugo Blanchet
January 20	Cancún, Mexico; Hard; M15; Singles and Doubles Draws	(Argentina) Manuel Peña López; 6–3, 6–0	(Argentina) Alejo Lorenzo Lingua Lavallén	(United States) Jordi Arconada (Brazil) José Pereira	(Slovenia) Tomás Lipovšek Puches (United States) Strong Kirchheimer (United States) Christian Langmo (Brazil) Mateus Alves
January 20	Cancún, Mexico; Hard; M15; Singles and Doubles Draws	(Argentina) Alejo Lorenzo Lingua Lavallén (Japan) Shintaro Mochizuki; Walkover	(United States) Jordi Arconada (United States) Tanner Smith	(United States) Jordi Arconada (Brazil) José Pereira	(Slovenia) Tomás Lipovšek Puches (United States) Strong Kirchheimer (United States) Christian Langmo (Brazil) Mateus Alves
January 20	Kazan, Russia; Hard (indoor); M15; Singles and Doubles Draws	(Uzbekistan) Sergey Fomin; 6–4, 3–6, 6–3	(Russia) Evgenii Tiurnev	(Russia) Konstantin Kravchuk (Russia) Maxim Ratniuk	(Ukraine) Oleksii Krutykh (Russia) Savriyan Danilov (Uzbekistan) Jurabek Karimov (Russia) Timur Kiyamov
January 20	Kazan, Russia; Hard (indoor); M15; Singles and Doubles Draws	(Russia) Alexander Igoshin (Russia) Evgenii Tiurnev; 7–6^{(8–6)}, 6–4	(Uzbekistan) Sergey Fomin (Uzbekistan) Jurabek Karimov	(Russia) Konstantin Kravchuk (Russia) Maxim Ratniuk	(Ukraine) Oleksii Krutykh (Russia) Savriyan Danilov (Uzbekistan) Jurabek Karimov (Russia) Timur Kiyamov
January 20	Monastir, Tunisia; Hard; M15; Singles and Doubles Draws	(Portugal) Nuno Borges; 6–4, 7–6^{(8–6)}	(Belgium) Zizou Bergs	(Cyprus) Petros Chrysochos (Argentina) Sebastián Báez	(Tunisia) Skander Mansouri (Italy) Matteo Arnaldi (United Kingdom) Aidan McHugh (Netherlands) Jesper de Jong
January 20	Monastir, Tunisia; Hard; M15; Singles and Doubles Draws	(Russia) Artem Dubrivnyy (Kazakhstan) Timur Khabibulin; 7–5, 6–3	(Tunisia) Aziz Dougaz (Tunisia) Moez Echargui	(Cyprus) Petros Chrysochos (Argentina) Sebastián Báez	(Tunisia) Skander Mansouri (Italy) Matteo Arnaldi (United Kingdom) Aidan McHugh (Netherlands) Jesper de Jong
January 20	Antalya, Turkey; Clay; M15; Singles and Doubles Draws	(Kazakhstan) Timofei Skatov; 6–3, 4–6, 6–3	(Serbia) Miljan Zekić	(Sweden) Dragoș Nicolae Mădăraș (Netherlands) Justin Eleveld	(Chile) Gonzalo Lama (Spain) Pol Martín Tiffon (Hungary) Péter Nagy (Italy) Luca Prevosto
January 20	Antalya, Turkey; Clay; M15; Singles and Doubles Draws	(Romania) Bogdan Borza (Sweden) Dragoș Nicolae Mădăraș; 6–3, 4–6, [10–7]	(Netherlands) Justin Eleveld (India) Nitin Kumar Sinha	(Sweden) Dragoș Nicolae Mădăraș (Netherlands) Justin Eleveld	(Chile) Gonzalo Lama (Spain) Pol Martín Tiffon (Hungary) Péter Nagy (Italy) Luca Prevosto
January 27	Nonthaburi, Thailand; Hard; M25; Singles and Doubles Draws	(Croatia) Matija Pecotić; 6–1, 3–6, 6–2	(Uzbekistan) Khumoyun Sultanov	(Egypt) Karim-Mohamed Maamoun (Czech Republic) Adam Pavlásek	(Kazakhstan) Denis Yevseyev (Chinese Taipei) Tseng Chun-hsin (Austria) Maximilian Neuchrist (Japan) Shuichi Sekiguchi
January 27	Nonthaburi, Thailand; Hard; M25; Singles and Doubles Draws	(Thailand) Sonchat Ratiwatana (Thailand) Wishaya Trongcharoenchaikul; 3–6, 6–4, [10–5]	(South Korea) Chung Yun-seong (France) Corentin Denolly	(Egypt) Karim-Mohamed Maamoun (Czech Republic) Adam Pavlásek	(Kazakhstan) Denis Yevseyev (Chinese Taipei) Tseng Chun-hsin (Austria) Maximilian Neuchrist (Japan) Shuichi Sekiguchi
January 27	Weston, United States; Clay; M25; Singles and Doubles Draws	(Italy) Gianluigi Quinzi; 3–6, 7–5, 7–5	(Sweden) Christian Lindell	(United States) Emilio Nava (Argentina) Manuel Peña López	(Spain) Javier Barranco Cosano (Brazil) Wilson Leite (United States) Alexander Ritschard (Germany) Peter Torebko
January 27	Weston, United States; Clay; M25; Singles and Doubles Draws	(Bolivia) Boris Arias (Brazil) Daniel Dutra da Silva; 6–4, 7–6^{(7–2)}	(Peru) Alexander Merino (Argentina) Manuel Peña López	(United States) Emilio Nava (Argentina) Manuel Peña López	(Spain) Javier Barranco Cosano (Brazil) Wilson Leite (United States) Alexander Ritschard (Germany) Peter Torebko
January 27	Cairo, Egypt; Clay; M15; Singles and Doubles Draws	(Argentina) Juan Pablo Paz; 6–3, 7–6^{(8–6)}	(Russia) Evgenii Tiurnev	(France) Jules Okala (Russia) Alexander Shevchenko	(Ukraine) Yurii Dzhavakian (Russia) Andrey Chepelev (France) Matthieu Perchicot (Italy) Fabrizio Ornago
January 27	Cairo, Egypt; Clay; M15; Singles and Doubles Draws	(Russia) Alexander Igoshin (Russia) Evgenii Tiurnev; 6–2, 6–2	(Ukraine) Oleg Khotkov (China) Liu Hanyi	(France) Jules Okala (Russia) Alexander Shevchenko	(Ukraine) Yurii Dzhavakian (Russia) Andrey Chepelev (France) Matthieu Perchicot (Italy) Fabrizio Ornago
January 27	Veigy-Foncenex, France; Carpet (indoor); M15; Singles and Doubles Draws	(Belgium) Christopher Heyman; 6–1, 6–3	(France) Alexis Gautier	(France) Matteo Martineau (France) Quentin Robert	(France) Antoine Cornut-Chauvinc (United Kingdom) Stuart Parker (Germany) Elmar Ejupovic (France) Maxime Tchoutakian
January 27	Veigy-Foncenex, France; Carpet (indoor); M15; Singles and Doubles Draws	(Germany) Fabian Fallert (Germany) Mats Rosenkranz; 6–4, 6–3	(Netherlands) Ryan Nijboer (Netherlands) Glenn Smits	(France) Matteo Martineau (France) Quentin Robert	(France) Antoine Cornut-Chauvinc (United Kingdom) Stuart Parker (Germany) Elmar Ejupovic (France) Maxime Tchoutakian
January 27	Cancún, Mexico; Hard; M15; Singles and Doubles Draws	(United States) Strong Kirchheimer; 6–4, 6–4	(United States) Dusty Boyer	(United States) Chad Kissell (United States) Vasil Kirkov	(United States) Nick Chappell (United States) Connor Farren (Argentina) Maximiliano Estévez (New Zealand) Ajeet Rai
January 27	Cancún, Mexico; Hard; M15; Singles and Doubles Draws	(Republic of Ireland) Simon Carr (New Zealand) Ajeet Rai; 6–4, 6–2	(France) Gabriel Petit (Australia) Brandon Walkin	(United States) Chad Kissell (United States) Vasil Kirkov	(United States) Nick Chappell (United States) Connor Farren (Argentina) Maximiliano Estévez (New Zealand) Ajeet Rai
January 27	Monastir, Tunisia; Hard; M15; Singles and Doubles Draws	(Argentina) Sebastián Báez; 6–1, 6–2	(Belgium) Gauthier Onclin	(Serbia) Marko Tepavac (United Kingdom) Luke Johnson	(Italy) Jacopo Berrettini (Belgium) Arnaud Bovy (Italy) Andrea Guerrieri (Tunisia) Moez Echargui
January 27	Monastir, Tunisia; Hard; M15; Singles and Doubles Draws	(Romania) Adrian Barbu (Tunisia) Aziz Dougaz; 6–4, 6–4	(Belgium) Arnaud Bovy (Belgium) Gauthier Onclin	(Serbia) Marko Tepavac (United Kingdom) Luke Johnson	(Italy) Jacopo Berrettini (Belgium) Arnaud Bovy (Italy) Andrea Guerrieri (Tunisia) Moez Echargui
January 27	Antalya, Turkey; Clay; M15; Singles and Doubles Draws	(Hungary) Zsombor Piros; 4–6, 6–4, 6–3	(Spain) Carlos Alcaraz	(Italy) Davide Galoppini (Bulgaria) Alexandar Lazarov	(Hungary) Péter Nagy (Romania) Alexandru Jecan (Italy) Marco Bortolotti (Kazakhstan) Timofei Skatov
January 27	Antalya, Turkey; Clay; M15; Singles and Doubles Draws	(Italy) Giovanni Fonio (Italy) Davide Galoppini; 6–4, 3–6, [10–3]	(Turkey) Umut Akkoyun (Turkey) Mert Naci Türker	(Italy) Davide Galoppini (Bulgaria) Alexandar Lazarov	(Hungary) Péter Nagy (Romania) Alexandru Jecan (Italy) Marco Bortolotti (Kazakhstan) Timofei Skatov

=== February ===
Week of	Tournament	Winner	Runners-up	Semifinalists	Quarterfinalists
February 3	Lima, Peru; Clay; M25; Singles and Doubles Draws	(Chile) Marcelo Tomás Barrios Vera; 6–2, 6–2	(Spain) Carlos Gómez-Herrera	(Serbia) Miljan Zekić (Brazil) Pedro Sakamoto	(Chile) Bastián Malla (Argentina) Tomás Martín Etcheverry (Argentina) Genaro Alberto Olivieri (Argentina) Manuel Peña López
February 3	Lima, Peru; Clay; M25; Singles and Doubles Draws	(Chile) Marcelo Tomás Barrios Vera (Spain) Carlos Gómez-Herrera; 7–5, 6–2	(Argentina) Nicolás Alberto Arreche (Peru) Jorge Panta	(Serbia) Miljan Zekić (Brazil) Pedro Sakamoto	(Chile) Bastián Malla (Argentina) Tomás Martín Etcheverry (Argentina) Genaro Alberto Olivieri (Argentina) Manuel Peña López
February 3	Nonthaburi, Thailand; Hard; M25; Singles and Doubles Draws	(France) Benjamin Bonzi; 6–4, 6–1	(Germany) Sebastian Fanselow	(Chinese Taipei) Yang Tsung-hua (Croatia) Matija Pecotić	(France) Laurent Lokoli (Japan) Makoto Ochi (Uzbekistan) Khumoyun Sultanov (Czech Republic) Adam Pavlásek
February 3	Nonthaburi, Thailand; Hard; M25; Singles and Doubles Draws	(France) Benjamin Bonzi (France) Corentin Denolly; 6–2, 6–4	(Germany) Sebastian Fanselow (Egypt) Karim-Mohamed Maamoun	(Chinese Taipei) Yang Tsung-hua (Croatia) Matija Pecotić	(France) Laurent Lokoli (Japan) Makoto Ochi (Uzbekistan) Khumoyun Sultanov (Czech Republic) Adam Pavlásek
February 3	Palm Coast, United States; Clay; M25; Singles and Doubles Draws	(United States) Alexander Ritschard; 7–6^{(9–7)}, 6–4	(Latvia) Mārtiņš Podžus	(Brazil) Daniel Dutra da Silva (United States) Alex Rybakov	(Colombia) Nicolás Mejía (Germany) Peter Torebko (Italy) Gianluigi Quinzi (United States) Martin Redlicki
February 3	Palm Coast, United States; Clay; M25; Singles and Doubles Draws	(United States) Justin Butsch (United States) Alex Rybakov; 2–6, 7–5, [12–10]	(Sweden) Simon Freund (Spain) Jaume Pla Malfeito	(Brazil) Daniel Dutra da Silva (United States) Alex Rybakov	(Colombia) Nicolás Mejía (Germany) Peter Torebko (Italy) Gianluigi Quinzi (United States) Martin Redlicki
February 3	Sharm El Sheikh, Egypt; Hard; M15; Singles and Doubles Draws	(Italy) Alessandro Bega; 6–4, 6–2	(Czech Republic) Marek Gengel	(Spain) Pablo Vivero González (Turkey) Ergi Kırkın	(Italy) Andrea Picchione (Czech Republic) David Poljak (France) Louis Tessa (Ukraine) Yurii Dzhavakian
February 3	Sharm El Sheikh, Egypt; Hard; M15; Singles and Doubles Draws	(Germany) Niklas Schell (Germany) Paul Wörner; 3–6, 7–6^{(7–3)}, [10–4]	(Spain) José Francisco Vidal Azorín (Spain) Pablo Vivero Gonzalez	(Spain) Pablo Vivero González (Turkey) Ergi Kırkın	(Italy) Andrea Picchione (Czech Republic) David Poljak (France) Louis Tessa (Ukraine) Yurii Dzhavakian
February 3	Cancún, Mexico; Hard; M15; Singles and Doubles Draws	(France) Geoffrey Blancaneaux; 6–7^{(5–7)}, 6–3, 6–1	(Argentina) Maximiliano Estévez	(Chile) Michel Vernier (Brazil) Igor Marcondes	(United States) Zane Khan (United States) Vasil Kirkov (United States) Felix Corwin (Mexico) Gerardo López Villaseñor
February 3	Cancún, Mexico; Hard; M15; Singles and Doubles Draws	(Brazil) Mateus Alves (Brazil) Igor Marcondes; 7–6^{(7–5)}, 7–5	(France) Geoffrey Blancaneaux (France) Gabriel Petit	(Chile) Michel Vernier (Brazil) Igor Marcondes	(United States) Zane Khan (United States) Vasil Kirkov (United States) Felix Corwin (Mexico) Gerardo López Villaseñor
February 3	Monastir, Tunisia; Hard; M15; Singles and Doubles Draws	(Monaco) Lucas Catarina; 6–0, 4–6, 7–5	(Portugal) Tiago Cação	(Tunisia) Aziz Dougaz (United States) Nicolas Moreno de Alboran	(Argentina) Sebastián Báez (Spain) Alberto Barroso Campos (Portugal) Luís Faria (Italy) Omar Giacalone
February 3	Monastir, Tunisia; Hard; M15; Singles and Doubles Draws	(Tunisia) Aziz Dougaz (Tunisia) Majed Kilani; 6–7^{(5–7)}, 6–4, [11–9]	(Spain) Alberto Barroso Campos (Spain) Benjamín Winter López	(Tunisia) Aziz Dougaz (United States) Nicolas Moreno de Alboran	(Argentina) Sebastián Báez (Spain) Alberto Barroso Campos (Portugal) Luís Faria (Italy) Omar Giacalone
February 3	Antalya, Turkey; Clay; M15; Singles and Doubles Draws	(Italy) Giovanni Fonio; 4–6, 6–4, 6–3	(Czech Republic) Michael Vrbenský	(Italy) Davide Galoppini (Bulgaria) Alexandar Lazarov	(Romania) Bogdan Borza (Romania) Filip Cristian Jianu (Italy) Riccardo Bonadio (Hungary) Zsombor Piros
February 3	Antalya, Turkey; Clay; M15; Singles and Doubles Draws	(Poland) Daniel Michalski (Czech Republic) Michael Vrbenský; 6–1, 2–6, [12–10]	(Netherlands) Max Houkes (Spain) David Jordà Sanchis	(Italy) Davide Galoppini (Bulgaria) Alexandar Lazarov	(Romania) Bogdan Borza (Romania) Filip Cristian Jianu (Italy) Riccardo Bonadio (Hungary) Zsombor Piros
February 10	Aktobe, Kazakhstan; Hard (indoor); M25; Singles and Doubles Draws	(Russia) Alexey Zakharov; 7–6^{(7–5)}, 3–6, 6–3	(Russia) Evgenii Tiurnev	(Russia) Konstantin Kravchuk (Russia) Alexander Igoshin	(Italy) Francesco Forti (Italy) Riccardo Balzerani (Kazakhstan) Denis Yevseyev (Finland) Otto Virtanen
February 10	Aktobe, Kazakhstan; Hard (indoor); M25; Singles and Doubles Draws	(South Korea) Chung Yun-seong (Bosnia and Herzegovina) Aldin Šetkić; 6–3, 6–4	(Italy) Riccardo Balzerani (Italy) Francesco Forti	(Russia) Konstantin Kravchuk (Russia) Alexander Igoshin	(Italy) Francesco Forti (Italy) Riccardo Balzerani (Kazakhstan) Denis Yevseyev (Finland) Otto Virtanen
February 10	Lima, Peru; Clay; M25; Singles and Doubles Draws	(Argentina) Facundo Argüello; 6–2, 6–4	(Chile) Marcelo Tomás Barrios Vera	(Brazil) Pedro Sakamoto (Argentina) Mariano Kestelboim	(Argentina) Gonzalo Villanueva (Peru) Nicolás Álvarez (Argentina) Nicolás Alberto Arreche (Bolivia) Federico Zeballos
February 10	Lima, Peru; Clay; M25; Singles and Doubles Draws	(Peru) Sergio Galdós (Peru) Conner Huertas del Pino; 6–4, 4–6, [10–5]	(Peru) Nicolás Álvarez (Peru) Jorge Panta	(Brazil) Pedro Sakamoto (Argentina) Mariano Kestelboim	(Argentina) Gonzalo Villanueva (Peru) Nicolás Álvarez (Argentina) Nicolás Alberto Arreche (Bolivia) Federico Zeballos
February 10	Barnstaple, United Kingdom; Hard (indoor); M25; Singles and Doubles Draws	(Poland) Kacper Żuk; 7–6^{(7–3)}, 6–3	(Belgium) Christopher Heyman	(United Kingdom) Aidan McHugh (Finland) Patrik Niklas-Salminen	(United Kingdom) Jack Draper (United Kingdom) Henry Patten (Poland) Jan Zieliński (United Kingdom) Mark Whitehouse
February 10	Barnstaple, United Kingdom; Hard (indoor); M25; Singles and Doubles Draws	(Poland) Jan Zieliński (Poland) Kacper Żuk; 6–3, 7–6^{(7–5)}	(United Kingdom) Evan Hoyt (United Kingdom) Luke Johnson	(United Kingdom) Aidan McHugh (Finland) Patrik Niklas-Salminen	(United Kingdom) Jack Draper (United Kingdom) Henry Patten (Poland) Jan Zieliński (United Kingdom) Mark Whitehouse
February 10	Naples, United States; Clay; M25; Singles and Doubles Draws	(Russia) Ronald Slobodchikov; 5–7, 6–1, 6–4	(Colombia) Alejandro Gómez	(United States) Evan Zhu (Colombia) Cristian Rodríguez	(Colombia) Alejandro González (Sweden) Filip Bergevi (Brazil) Daniel Dutra da Silva (Spain) Eduard Esteve Lobato
February 10	Naples, United States; Clay; M25; Singles and Doubles Draws	(United States) Martin Damm (United States) Toby Kodat; 4–6, 6–4, [10–7]	(Colombia) Nicolás Barrientos (Colombia) Cristian Rodríguez	(United States) Evan Zhu (Colombia) Cristian Rodríguez	(Colombia) Alejandro González (Sweden) Filip Bergevi (Brazil) Daniel Dutra da Silva (Spain) Eduard Esteve Lobato
February 10	Sharm El Sheikh, Egypt; Hard; M15; Singles and Doubles Draws	(Italy) Alessandro Bega; 6–4, 7–5	(Czech Republic) Marek Gengel	(Ukraine) Oleksii Krutykh (Russia) Egor Agafonov	(Spain) Pablo Vivero González (Sweden) Simon Yitbarek (Italy) Jacopo Berrettini (Ukraine) Vitaliy Sachko
February 10	Sharm El Sheikh, Egypt; Hard; M15; Singles and Doubles Draws	(Poland) Piotr Matuszewski (Czech Republic) David Poljak; 6–4, 7–6^{(8–6)}	(Spain) José Francisco Vidal Azorín (Spain) Pablo Vivero González	(Ukraine) Oleksii Krutykh (Russia) Egor Agafonov	(Spain) Pablo Vivero González (Sweden) Simon Yitbarek (Italy) Jacopo Berrettini (Ukraine) Vitaliy Sachko
February 10	Grenoble, France; Hard (indoor); M15; Singles and Doubles Draws	(France) Gleb Sakharov; 6–3, 7–6^{(7–4)}	(France) Antoine Cornut-Chauvinc	(France) Alexandre Peyrot (Switzerland) Antoine Bellier	(Netherlands) Mick Veldheer (France) Clément Tabur (France) Arthur Reymond (Czech Republic) Jan Šátral
February 10	Grenoble, France; Hard (indoor); M15; Singles and Doubles Draws	(Russia) Artem Dubrivnyy (Czech Republic) Andrew Paulson; 7–6^{(7–4)}, 3–6, [10–7]	(Germany) Fabian Fallert (Germany) Hendrik Jebens	(France) Alexandre Peyrot (Switzerland) Antoine Bellier	(Netherlands) Mick Veldheer (France) Clément Tabur (France) Arthur Reymond (Czech Republic) Jan Šátral
February 10	Heraklion, Greece; Hard; M15; Singles and Doubles Draws	(Belgium) Clément Geens; 3–6, 6–4, 6–1	(Belgium) Zizou Bergs	(France) Alexis Musialek (United Kingdom) Billy Harris	(Italy) Omar Giacalone (Italy) Antonio Massara (Italy) Mattia Bellucci (Greece) Petros Tsitsipas
February 10	Heraklion, Greece; Hard; M15; Singles and Doubles Draws	(Austria) David Pichler (Germany) Kai Wehnelt; 7–6^{(7–1)}, 6–7^{(6–8)}, [10–7]	(France) Jaimee Floyd Angele (France) Alexis Musialek	(France) Alexis Musialek (United Kingdom) Billy Harris	(Italy) Omar Giacalone (Italy) Antonio Massara (Italy) Mattia Bellucci (Greece) Petros Tsitsipas
February 10	Cancún, Mexico; Hard; M15; Singles and Doubles Draws	(Brazil) João Lucas Reis da Silva; 7–6^{(13–11)}, 6–1	(Argentina) Maximiliano Estévez	(The Bahamas) Justin Roberts (France) Gabriel Petit	(United States) Joshua Ortlip (United States) Felix Corwin (United States) Strong Kirchheimer (United States) Connor Farren
February 10	Cancún, Mexico; Hard; M15; Singles and Doubles Draws	(Argentina) Alejo Lorenzo Lingua Lavallén (Brazil) Igor Marcondes; 6–4, 6–2	(United States) George Goldhoff (United States) Alfredo Perez	(The Bahamas) Justin Roberts (France) Gabriel Petit	(United States) Joshua Ortlip (United States) Felix Corwin (United States) Strong Kirchheimer (United States) Connor Farren
February 10	Palma Nova, Spain; Clay; M15; Singles and Doubles Draws	(Spain) Nikolás Sánchez Izquierdo; 4–6, 6–2, 6–2	(France) Jules Okala	(Argentina) Sebastián Báez (Germany) Peter Heller	(Spain) Pedro Vives Marcos (Spain) Álvaro López San Martín (Spain) Carlos Gimeno Valero (France) Matthieu Perchicot
February 10	Palma Nova, Spain; Clay; M15; Singles and Doubles Draws	(Spain) Álvaro López San Martín (Spain) Nikolás Sánchez Izquierdo; 6–4, 7–6^{(7–4)}	(France) Jonathan Eysseric (France) Maxime Mora	(Argentina) Sebastián Báez (Germany) Peter Heller	(Spain) Pedro Vives Marcos (Spain) Álvaro López San Martín (Spain) Carlos Gimeno Valero (France) Matthieu Perchicot
February 10	Monastir, Tunisia; Hard; M15; Singles and Doubles Draws	(Bosnia and Herzegovina) Aziz Kijametović; 3–6, 7–6^{(7–4)}, 7–5	(Portugal) João Monteiro	(Tunisia) Moez Echargui (Switzerland) Rémy Bertola	(United States) Nicolas Moreno de Alboran (Czech Republic) Michal Konečný (Belgium) Arnaud Bovy (Romania) Filip Cristian Jianu
February 10	Monastir, Tunisia; Hard; M15; Singles and Doubles Draws	(Poland) Michał Mikuła (Poland) Yann Wójcik; 6–3, 6–4	(Switzerland) Rémy Bertola (Italy) Francesco Vilardo	(Tunisia) Moez Echargui (Switzerland) Rémy Bertola	(United States) Nicolas Moreno de Alboran (Czech Republic) Michal Konečný (Belgium) Arnaud Bovy (Romania) Filip Cristian Jianu
February 10	Antalya, Turkey; Clay; M15; Singles and Doubles Draws	(Italy) Riccardo Bonadio; 3–6, 6–4, 6–1	(Argentina) Juan Pablo Paz	(Hungary) Fábián Marozsán (Japan) Naoki Tajima	(Romania) Vasile Antonescu (Austria) Filip Misolic (Bulgaria) Alexandar Lazarov (Hungary) Péter Fajta
February 10	Antalya, Turkey; Clay; M15; Singles and Doubles Draws	Doubles competition was cancelled due to poor weather conditions		(Hungary) Fábián Marozsán (Japan) Naoki Tajima	(Romania) Vasile Antonescu (Austria) Filip Misolic (Bulgaria) Alexandar Lazarov (Hungary) Péter Fajta
February 17	Aktobe, Kazakhstan; Hard (indoor); M25; Singles and Doubles Draws	(Japan) Yuta Shimizu; 6–4, 5–7, 6–3	(Finland) Otto Virtanen	(Russia) Savriyan Danilov (Ukraine) Vladyslav Manafov	(Uzbekistan) Jurabek Karimov (Italy) Francesco Forti (Japan) Rio Noguchi (Estonia) Vladimir Ivanov
February 17	Aktobe, Kazakhstan; Hard (indoor); M25; Singles and Doubles Draws	(Belarus) Ivan Liutarevich (Ukraine) Vladyslav Manafov; 7–5, 7–6^{(7–5)}	(Estonia) Vladimir Ivanov (Russia) Maksim Ratniuk	(Russia) Savriyan Danilov (Ukraine) Vladyslav Manafov	(Uzbekistan) Jurabek Karimov (Italy) Francesco Forti (Japan) Rio Noguchi (Estonia) Vladimir Ivanov
February 17	Glasgow, United Kingdom; Hard (indoor); M25; Singles and Doubles Draws	(France) Lucas Poullain; 0–6, 7–5, 6–3	(United Kingdom) Jack Draper	(Netherlands) Jesper de Jong (United Kingdom) Evan Hoyt	(France) Valentin Royer (United Kingdom) Luke Johnson (United Kingdom) Mark Whitehouse (Poland) Wojciech Marek
February 17	Glasgow, United Kingdom; Hard (indoor); M25; Singles and Doubles Draws	(Poland) Szymon Walków (Poland) Jan Zieliński; 6–1, 6–1	(Sweden) Simon Freund (United Kingdom) Evan Hoyt	(Netherlands) Jesper de Jong (United Kingdom) Evan Hoyt	(France) Valentin Royer (United Kingdom) Luke Johnson (United Kingdom) Mark Whitehouse (Poland) Wojciech Marek
February 17	Punta del Este, Uruguay; Clay; M25; Singles and Doubles Draws	(Argentina) Santiago Rodríguez Taverna; 6–4, 6–3	(Argentina) Franco Agamenone	(Argentina) Francisco Cerúndolo (Argentina) Mariano Navone	(Argentina) Camilo Ugo Carabelli (Argentina) Gonzalo Villanueva (Peru) Nicolás Álvarez (Argentina) Tomás Martín Etcheverry
February 17	Punta del Este, Uruguay; Clay; M25; Singles and Doubles Draws	(Argentina) Franco Agamenone (Brazil) Daniel Dutra da Silva; 6–0, 6–1	(Peru) Alexander Merino (Argentina) Manuel Peña López	(Argentina) Francisco Cerúndolo (Argentina) Mariano Navone	(Argentina) Camilo Ugo Carabelli (Argentina) Gonzalo Villanueva (Peru) Nicolás Álvarez (Argentina) Tomás Martín Etcheverry
February 17	Sharm El Sheikh, Egypt; Hard; M15; Singles and Doubles Draws	(Spain) Pablo Vivero González; 6–3, 0–0, ret.	(Czech Republic) Robin Staněk	(Ukraine) Oleksii Krutykh (Italy) Jacopo Berrettini	(Netherlands) Ryan Nijboer (Ukraine) Vitaliy Sachko (Estonia) Daniil Glinka (Ukraine) Oleksandr Ovcharenko
February 17	Sharm El Sheikh, Egypt; Hard; M15; Singles and Doubles Draws	(Netherlands) Stijn Pel (Czech Republic) Robin Staněk; 7–6^{(7–5)}, 3–6, [10–8]	(Canada) Raheel Manji (Canada) Kelsey Stevenson	(Ukraine) Oleksii Krutykh (Italy) Jacopo Berrettini	(Netherlands) Ryan Nijboer (Ukraine) Vitaliy Sachko (Estonia) Daniil Glinka (Ukraine) Oleksandr Ovcharenko
February 17	Oberhaching, Germany; Hard (indoor); M15; Singles and Doubles Draws	(Czech Republic) Jan Šátral; 6–3, 6–2	(Germany) Elmar Ejupovic	(Czech Republic) Dalibor Svrčina (Netherlands) Mick Veldheer	(Switzerland) Jakub Paul (Germany) Timo Stodder (Germany) Christoph Negritu (Switzerland) Leandro Riedi
February 17	Oberhaching, Germany; Hard (indoor); M15; Singles and Doubles Draws	(Germany) Lasse Muscheites (Germany) Stefan Seifert; 6–3, 7–5	(Germany) Kai Lemstra (Germany) Christoph Negritu	(Czech Republic) Dalibor Svrčina (Netherlands) Mick Veldheer	(Switzerland) Jakub Paul (Germany) Timo Stodder (Germany) Christoph Negritu (Switzerland) Leandro Riedi
February 17	Heraklion, Greece; Hard; M15; Singles and Doubles Draws	(France) Alexis Musialek; 7–6^{(8–6)}, 6–1	(Italy) Omar Giacalone	(Belgium) Clément Geens (Italy) Antonio Massara	(Ecuador) Antonio Cayetano March (Romania) Nicholas David Ionel (Netherlands) Guy den Heijer (Russia) Alexander Shevchenko
February 17	Heraklion, Greece; Hard; M15; Singles and Doubles Draws	(Austria) Alexander Erler (Austria) David Pichler; 3–6, 6–4, [10–4]	(Germany) Valentin Günther (Germany) Kai Wehnelt	(Belgium) Clément Geens (Italy) Antonio Massara	(Ecuador) Antonio Cayetano March (Romania) Nicholas David Ionel (Netherlands) Guy den Heijer (Russia) Alexander Shevchenko
February 17	Cancún, Mexico; Hard; M15; Singles and Doubles Draws	(United States) Gage Brymer; 6–1, 6–4	(France) Gabriel Petit	(Brazil) Igor Marcondes (Slovenia) Matic Špec	(United States) Austin Rapp (United States) Maksim Tikhomirov (France) Jean Thirouin (Brazil) Gilbert Klier Júnior
February 17	Cancún, Mexico; Hard; M15; Singles and Doubles Draws	(Brazil) Igor Marcondes (Australia) Brandon Walkin; 6–3, 6–4	(Argentina) Francisco Comesaña (Argentina) Alejo Lorenzo Lingua Lavallén	(Brazil) Igor Marcondes (Slovenia) Matic Špec	(United States) Austin Rapp (United States) Maksim Tikhomirov (France) Jean Thirouin (Brazil) Gilbert Klier Júnior
February 17	Paguera, Spain; Clay; M15; Singles and Doubles Draws	(Argentina) Pedro Cachin; 6–4, 6–2	(France) Matthieu Perchicot	(Spain) Ricardo Ojeda Lara (Spain) Pedro Vives Marcos	(France) Jonathan Eysseric (Italy) Francesco Passaro (Spain) Pablo Llamas Ruiz (Spain) Carlos Sánchez Jover
February 17	Paguera, Spain; Clay; M15; Singles and Doubles Draws	(Morocco) Anas Fattar (Morocco) Lamine Ouahab; 6–3, 7–6^{(9–7)}	(Italy) Alessandro Ceppellini (Italy) Alexander Weis	(Spain) Ricardo Ojeda Lara (Spain) Pedro Vives Marcos	(France) Jonathan Eysseric (Italy) Francesco Passaro (Spain) Pablo Llamas Ruiz (Spain) Carlos Sánchez Jover
February 17	Monastir, Tunisia; Hard; M15; Singles and Doubles Draws	(France) Thomas Laurent; 6–1, 6–0	(France) Quentin Folliot	(France) Benjamin Pietri (Hong Kong) Yeung Pak-long	(Switzerland) Riccardo Maiga (Spain) Nicolás Álvarez Varona (India) Manish Sureshkumar (Switzerland) Rémy Bertola
February 17	Monastir, Tunisia; Hard; M15; Singles and Doubles Draws	(Tunisia) Moez Echargui (Tunisia) Anis Ghorbel; 7–5, 6–4	(Bosnia and Herzegovina) Aziz Kijametović (Morocco) Adam Moundir	(France) Benjamin Pietri (Hong Kong) Yeung Pak-long	(Switzerland) Riccardo Maiga (Spain) Nicolás Álvarez Varona (India) Manish Sureshkumar (Switzerland) Rémy Bertola
February 17	Antalya, Turkey; Clay; M15; Singles and Doubles Draws	(Czech Republic) Jonáš Forejtek; 6–4, 6–3	(Spain) Nikolás Sánchez Izquierdo	(France) Maxime Hamou (France) Jules Okala	(Serbia) Marko Miladinović (Croatia) Domagoj Bilješko (Israel) Yshai Oliel (Hungary) Péter Makk
February 17	Antalya, Turkey; Clay; M15; Singles and Doubles Draws	(Romania) Călin Manda (Ukraine) Oleg Prihodko; 2–6, 7–6^{(7–3)}, [10–8]	(Hungary) Fábián Marozsán (Hungary) Péter Nagy	(France) Maxime Hamou (France) Jules Okala	(Serbia) Marko Miladinović (Croatia) Domagoj Bilješko (Israel) Yshai Oliel (Hungary) Péter Makk
February 24	Río Cuarto, Argentina; Clay; M25; Singles and Doubles Draws	(Argentina) Camilo Ugo Carabelli; 7–6^{(11–9)}, 6–2	(Argentina) Tomás Martín Etcheverry	(Argentina) Facundo Díaz Acosta (Argentina) Franco Agamenone	(Argentina) Facundo Argüello (Argentina) Juan Manuel Cerúndolo (Argentina) Román Andrés Burruchaga (Argentina) Mariano Kestelboim
February 24	Río Cuarto, Argentina; Clay; M25; Singles and Doubles Draws	(Argentina) Tomás Martín Etcheverry (Argentina) Mariano Kestelboim; 6–3, 1–6, [10–2]	(Peru) Alexander Merino (Argentina) Manuel Peña López	(Argentina) Facundo Díaz Acosta (Argentina) Franco Agamenone	(Argentina) Facundo Argüello (Argentina) Juan Manuel Cerúndolo (Argentina) Román Andrés Burruchaga (Argentina) Mariano Kestelboim
February 24	Trento, Italy; Hard (indoor); M25; Singles and Doubles Draws	(Belgium) Ruben Bemelmans; 4–6, 6–2, 6–4	(Austria) Alexander Erler	(Italy) Francesco Forti (Italy) Julian Ocleppo	(Bosnia and Herzegovina) Nerman Fatić (Germany) Elmar Ejupovic (Netherlands) Mick Veldheer (Italy) Raúl Brancaccio
February 24	Trento, Italy; Hard (indoor); M25; Singles and Doubles Draws	(Belgium) Ruben Bemelmans (Germany) Daniel Masur; 7–6^{(9–7)}, 6–2	(Austria) Alexander Erler (Spain) David Jordà Sanchis	(Italy) Francesco Forti (Italy) Julian Ocleppo	(Bosnia and Herzegovina) Nerman Fatić (Germany) Elmar Ejupovic (Netherlands) Mick Veldheer (Italy) Raúl Brancaccio
February 24	Antalya, Turkey; Clay; M25; Singles and Doubles Draws	(Croatia) Duje Ajduković; 3–6, 6–4, 7–6^{(7–2)}	(Argentina) Pedro Cachin	(Israel) Yshai Oliel (Czech Republic) Jonáš Forejtek	(Hungary) Fábián Marozsán (Israel) Ben Patael (Bulgaria) Dimitar Kuzmanov (France) Maxime Hamou
February 24	Antalya, Turkey; Clay; M25; Singles and Doubles Draws	(Czech Republic) Jonáš Forejtek (Czech Republic) Michael Vrbenský; 6–3, 6–4	(Hungary) Fábián Marozsán (Hungary) Péter Nagy	(Israel) Yshai Oliel (Czech Republic) Jonáš Forejtek	(Hungary) Fábián Marozsán (Israel) Ben Patael (Bulgaria) Dimitar Kuzmanov (France) Maxime Hamou
February 24	Sunderland, United Kingdom; Hard (indoor); M25; Singles and Doubles Draws	(United Kingdom) Jack Draper; 6–2, 6–0	(Netherlands) Igor Sijsling	(France) Valentin Royer (Netherlands) Jesper de Jong	(Belgium) Christopher Heyman (France) Dan Added (United Kingdom) Mark Whitehouse (United Kingdom) Anton Matusevich
February 24	Sunderland, United Kingdom; Hard (indoor); M25; Singles and Doubles Draws	(Poland) Szymon Walków (Poland) Jan Zieliński; 6–4, 6–4	(Netherlands) Jesper de Jong (Netherlands) Bart Stevens	(France) Valentin Royer (Netherlands) Jesper de Jong	(Belgium) Christopher Heyman (France) Dan Added (United Kingdom) Mark Whitehouse (United Kingdom) Anton Matusevich
February 24	Sharm El Sheikh, Egypt; Hard; M15; Singles and Doubles Draws	(Egypt) Karim-Mohamed Maamoun; 7–5, 6–3	(Czech Republic) David Poljak	(Japan) Soichiro Moritani (Vietnam) Lý Hoàng Nam	(Japan) Ryota Tanuma (Romania) Cezar Crețu (Ukraine) Oleksii Krutykh (Italy) Daniele Capecchi
February 24	Sharm El Sheikh, Egypt; Hard; M15; Singles and Doubles Draws	(Netherlands) Ryan Nijboer (Netherlands) Glenn Smits; 2–6, 6–3, [10–8]	(Ukraine) Oleksii Krutykh (Ukraine) Volodymyr Uzhylovskyi	(Japan) Soichiro Moritani (Vietnam) Lý Hoàng Nam	(Japan) Ryota Tanuma (Romania) Cezar Crețu (Ukraine) Oleksii Krutykh (Italy) Daniele Capecchi
February 24	Heraklion, Greece; Hard; M15; Singles and Doubles Draws	(Romania) Nicholas David Ionel; 6–4, 6–2	(Brazil) Jordan Correia	(Germany) Kai Wehnelt (United States) Vasil Kirkov	(Russia) Matvey Khomentovskiy (Serbia) Hamad Međedović (Ecuador) Antonio Cayetano March (Romania) Filip Cristian Jianu
February 24	Heraklion, Greece; Hard; M15; Singles and Doubles Draws	(Germany) Constantin Schmitz (Germany) Kai Wehnelt; 2–6, 6–4, [11–9]	(Montenegro) Ljubomir Čelebić (Montenegro) Igor Saveljić	(Germany) Kai Wehnelt (United States) Vasil Kirkov	(Russia) Matvey Khomentovskiy (Serbia) Hamad Međedović (Ecuador) Antonio Cayetano March (Romania) Filip Cristian Jianu
February 24	Vale do Lobo, Portugal; Hard; M15; Singles and Doubles Draws	(Spain) Ricardo Ojeda Lara; 1–6, 6–3, 6–4	(Italy) Riccardo Bonadio	(Germany) Sebastian Fanselow (Portugal) Tiago Cação	(France) Arthur Cazaux (France) Kenny de Schepper (Australia) Blake Ellis (United States) Nicolas Moreno de Alboran
February 24	Vale do Lobo, Portugal; Hard; M15; Singles and Doubles Draws	(Republic of Ireland) Peter Bothwell (United Kingdom) Billy Harris; 6–3, 6–4	(Spain) Albert Roglan (Spain) Benjamín Winter López	(Germany) Sebastian Fanselow (Portugal) Tiago Cação	(France) Arthur Cazaux (France) Kenny de Schepper (Australia) Blake Ellis (United States) Nicolas Moreno de Alboran
February 24	Trnava, Slovakia; Hard (indoor); M15; Singles and Doubles Draws	(Ukraine) Danylo Kalenichenko; 6–4, 6–4	(Latvia) Kārlis Ozoliņš	(Slovakia) Lukáš Klein (Ukraine) Vitaliy Sachko	(Bosnia and Herzegovina) Aldin Šetkić (Germany) Christoph Negritu (Czech Republic) Jan Šátral (Czech Republic) Petr Michnev
February 24	Trnava, Slovakia; Hard (indoor); M15; Singles and Doubles Draws	(Czech Republic) Patrik Rikl (Czech Republic) Jan Šátral; 6–3, 6–4	(Germany) Kai Lemstra (Germany) Christoph Negritu	(Slovakia) Lukáš Klein (Ukraine) Vitaliy Sachko	(Bosnia and Herzegovina) Aldin Šetkić (Germany) Christoph Negritu (Czech Republic) Jan Šátral (Czech Republic) Petr Michnev
February 24	Monastir, Tunisia; Hard; M15; Singles and Doubles Draws	(France) Thomas Laurent; 6–2, 6–3	(Spain) Nicolás Álvarez Varona	(Tunisia) Majed Kilani (France) Benjamin Pietri	(France) Baptiste Crepatte (France) Quentin Folliot (United Kingdom) George Loffhagen (Belgium) Guillaume Dermiens
February 24	Monastir, Tunisia; Hard; M15; Singles and Doubles Draws	(Tunisia) Moez Echargui (Tunisia) Anis Ghorbel; 6–0, 6–2	(France) Quentin Folliot (France) Hugo Pontico	(Tunisia) Majed Kilani (France) Benjamin Pietri	(France) Baptiste Crepatte (France) Quentin Folliot (United Kingdom) George Loffhagen (Belgium) Guillaume Dermiens

=== March ===
Week of	Tournament	Winner	Runners-up	Semifinalists	Quarterfinalists
March 2	Hurlingham, Argentina; Clay; M25; Singles and Doubles Draws	(Argentina) Facundo Díaz Acosta; 6–4, 6–3	(Argentina) Juan Manuel Cerúndolo	(Argentina) Francisco Cerúndolo (Argentina) Hernán Casanova	(Chile) Gonzalo Lama (Argentina) Manuel Peña López (Argentina) Nicolás Alberto Arreche (Argentina) Facundo Argüello
March 2	Hurlingham, Argentina; Clay; M25; Singles and Doubles Draws	(Uruguay) Ignacio Carou (Argentina) Francisco Comesaña; 7–6^{(7–2)}, 7–5	(Argentina) Gabriel Alejandro Hidalgo (Argentina) Ignacio Monzón	(Argentina) Francisco Cerúndolo (Argentina) Hernán Casanova	(Chile) Gonzalo Lama (Argentina) Manuel Peña López (Argentina) Nicolás Alberto Arreche (Argentina) Facundo Argüello
March 2	Mildura, Australia; Grass; M25; Singles and Doubles Draws	(United Kingdom) Brydan Klein; 7–5, 6–3	(Japan) Rio Noguchi	(Australia) Dayne Kelly (Australia) Scott Puodziunas	(Australia) Matthew Romios (Chinese Taipei) Hsu Yu-hsiou (France) Vincent Stouff (Australia) Thomas Fancutt
March 2	Mildura, Australia; Grass; M25; Singles and Doubles Draws	(Australia) Jeremy Beale (Australia) Thomas Fancutt; 4–6, 7–6^{(8–6)}, [10–3]	(United Kingdom) Brydan Klein (Australia) Scott Puodziunas	(Australia) Dayne Kelly (Australia) Scott Puodziunas	(Australia) Matthew Romios (Chinese Taipei) Hsu Yu-hsiou (France) Vincent Stouff (Australia) Thomas Fancutt
March 2	Potchefstroom, South Africa; Hard; M25; Singles and Doubles Draws	(France) Benjamin Bonzi; 7–6^{(14–12)}, 6–4	(Germany) Tobias Simon	(France) Matteo Martineau (France) Sadio Doumbia	(Serbia) Peđa Krstin (Netherlands) Mick Veldheer (Spain) Roberto Ortega Olmedo (France) Corentin Denolly
March 2	Potchefstroom, South Africa; Hard; M25; Singles and Doubles Draws	(France) Benjamin Bonzi (France) Matteo Martineau; 6–4, 6–2	(Republic of Ireland) Simon Carr (France) Corentin Denolly	(France) Matteo Martineau (France) Sadio Doumbia	(Serbia) Peđa Krstin (Netherlands) Mick Veldheer (Spain) Roberto Ortega Olmedo (France) Corentin Denolly
March 2	Murcia, Spain; Clay; M25; Singles and Doubles Draws	(Spain) Pablo Llamas Ruiz; 6–4, 3–6, 6–3	(Argentina) Pedro Cachin	(Spain) Álvaro López San Martín (Spain) Eduard Esteve Lobato	(France) Rayane Roumane (Spain) Íñigo Cervantes (Spain) Oriol Roca Batalla (Spain) Gerard Granollers
March 2	Murcia, Spain; Clay; M25; Singles and Doubles Draws	(Spain) Íñigo Cervantes (Spain) Oriol Roca Batalla; 7–6^{(7–3)}, 6–3	(Spain) Sergio Martos Gornés (Spain) David Pérez Sanz	(Spain) Álvaro López San Martín (Spain) Eduard Esteve Lobato	(France) Rayane Roumane (Spain) Íñigo Cervantes (Spain) Oriol Roca Batalla (Spain) Gerard Granollers
March 2	Las Vegas, United States; Hard; M25; Singles and Doubles Draws	(Cyprus) Petros Chrysochos; 6–2, 6–1	(United States) Justin Butsch	(United States) Alex Rybakov (United States) Nick Chappell	(Germany) Johannes Härteis (United States) Martin Redlicki (United States) Alfredo Perez (United States) Alexander Sarkissian
March 2	Las Vegas, United States; Hard; M25; Singles and Doubles Draws	(Colombia) Nicolás Barrientos (United States) Junior Alexander Ore; 7–6^{(7–1)}, 6–3	(United States) Nick Chappell (United States) Reese Stalder	(United States) Alex Rybakov (United States) Nick Chappell	(Germany) Johannes Härteis (United States) Martin Redlicki (United States) Alfredo Perez (United States) Alexander Sarkissian
March 2	Sharm El Sheikh, Egypt; Hard; M15; Singles and Doubles Draws	(Italy) Luca Nardi; 5–7, 6–4, 7–6^{(7–5)}	(Czech Republic) Jaroslav Pospíšil	(Canada) Kelsey Stevenson (Chinese Taipei) Lo Chien-hsun	(Ukraine) Volodymyr Uzhylovskyi (Chile) Diego Fernández Flores (Italy) Giorgio Ricca (Ukraine) Oleg Khotkov
March 2	Sharm El Sheikh, Egypt; Hard; M15; Singles and Doubles Draws	(Ukraine) Vladyslav Manafov (Austria) David Pichler; 6–1, 3–6, [10–7]	(Ukraine) Oleg Khotkov (Ukraine) Volodymyr Uzhylovskyi	(Canada) Kelsey Stevenson (Chinese Taipei) Lo Chien-hsun	(Ukraine) Volodymyr Uzhylovskyi (Chile) Diego Fernández Flores (Italy) Giorgio Ricca (Ukraine) Oleg Khotkov
March 2	Heraklion, Greece; Hard; M15; Singles and Doubles Draws	(Romania) Filip Cristian Jianu; 7–5, 3–6, 6–3	(Monaco) Lucas Catarina	(Montenegro) Ljubomir Čelebić (United States) Alexander Lebedev	(France) Antoine Cornut-Chauvinc (United States) Dusty Boyer (Austria) Alexander Erler (United States) Vasil Kirkov
March 2	Heraklion, Greece; Hard; M15; Singles and Doubles Draws	(Russia) Bogdan Bobrov (Austria) Alexander Erler; 2–6, 7–6^{(7–4)}, [12–10]	(France) Antoine Cornut-Chauvinc (Germany) Constantin Schmitz	(Montenegro) Ljubomir Čelebić (United States) Alexander Lebedev	(France) Antoine Cornut-Chauvinc (United States) Dusty Boyer (Austria) Alexander Erler (United States) Vasil Kirkov
March 2	Faro, Portugal; Hard; M15; Singles and Doubles Draws	(Germany) Sebastian Fanselow; 6–3, 6–3	(Portugal) Tiago Cação	(France) Evan Furness (Spain) Ricardo Ojeda Lara	(Italy) Riccardo Bonadio (Spain) Alberto Barroso Campos (France) Timo Legout (France) Matthieu Perchicot
March 2	Faro, Portugal; Hard; M15; Singles and Doubles Draws	(Germany) Fabian Fallert (United States) Nicolas Moreno de Alboran; 6–3, 6–4	(Poland) Michał Dembek (Portugal) Gonçalo Falcão	(France) Evan Furness (Spain) Ricardo Ojeda Lara	(Italy) Riccardo Bonadio (Spain) Alberto Barroso Campos (France) Timo Legout (France) Matthieu Perchicot
March 2	Monastir, Tunisia; Hard; M15; Singles and Doubles Draws	(France) Baptiste Crepatte; 7–6^{(7–1)}, 6–4	(France) Jonathan Eysseric	(France) Calvin Hemery (Switzerland) Jeffrey von der Schulenburg	(United Kingdom) George Loffhagen (Germany) Tim Handel (Czech Republic) Michal Konečný (Italy) Enrico Dalla Valle
March 2	Monastir, Tunisia; Hard; M15; Singles and Doubles Draws	(Tunisia) Anis Ghorbel (France) Louis Tessa; 6–1, 6–2	(Italy) Luca Giacomini (Russia) Kirill Kivattsev	(France) Calvin Hemery (Switzerland) Jeffrey von der Schulenburg	(United Kingdom) George Loffhagen (Germany) Tim Handel (Czech Republic) Michal Konečný (Italy) Enrico Dalla Valle
March 2	Antalya, Turkey; Clay; M15; Singles and Doubles Draws	(United States) Patrick Kypson; 6–4, 6–2	(Germany) Peter Heller	(Czech Republic) Michael Vrbenský (Germany) Peter Torebko	(Italy) Stefano Battaglino (Romania) Costin Pavăl (Spain) Pol Toledo Bagué (Czech Republic) Petr Nouza
March 2	Antalya, Turkey; Clay; M15; Singles and Doubles Draws	(Germany) Peter Heller (Germany) Peter Torebko; 7–5, 6–2	(United States) Tristan Boyer (United States) Martin Damm	(Czech Republic) Michael Vrbenský (Germany) Peter Torebko	(Italy) Stefano Battaglino (Romania) Costin Pavăl (Spain) Pol Toledo Bagué (Czech Republic) Petr Nouza
March 9	Geelong, Australia; Grass; M25; Singles and Doubles Draws				
March 9	Geelong, Australia; Grass; M25; Singles and Doubles Draws	All competition was cancelled due to the coronavirus pandemic			(Australia) Harry Bourchier (United Kingdom) Brydan Klein (Australia) Luke Saville (France) Vincent Stouff (Australia) Matthew Romios (Japan) Rio Noguchi (Chinese Taipei) Hsu Yu-hsiou (Australia) Dayne Kelly
March 9	Geelong, Australia; Grass; M25; Singles and Doubles Draws	(United Kingdom) Brydan Klein / (Australia) Scott Puodziunas vs (Australia) Adam Taylor / (Australia) Jason Taylor			(Australia) Harry Bourchier (United Kingdom) Brydan Klein (Australia) Luke Saville (France) Vincent Stouff (Australia) Matthew Romios (Japan) Rio Noguchi (Chinese Taipei) Hsu Yu-hsiou (Australia) Dayne Kelly
March 9	Poreč, Croatia; Clay; M15; Singles and Doubles Draws				(Czech Republic) Vít Kopřiva (Bosnia and Herzegovina) Nerman Fatić (Belarus) Uladzimir Ignatik (Italy) Julian Ocleppo (Denmark) Holger Rune (Italy) Giovanni Fonio (Germany) Lucas Gerch (Croatia) Matija Pecotić
March 9	Sharm El Sheikh, Egypt; Hard; M15; Singles and Doubles Draws				(Germany) Mats Rosenkranz (Italy) Alessandro Petrone
March 9	Toulouse, France; Hard (indoor); M15; Singles and Doubles Draws				(France) Laurent Lokoli (France) Kenny de Schepper (France) Dan Added (France) Louis Tessa (France) Pierre Faivre (France) Alexis Gautier (France) Rayane Roumane
March 9	Heraklion, Greece; Hard; M15; Singles and Doubles Draws				(Turkey) Altuğ Çelikbilek (United States) Vasil Kirkov (France) Antoine Cornut-Chauvinc (United States) Dusty Boyer (Greece) Aristotelis Thanos (Belgium) Clément Geens (United Kingdom) Luke Johnson (Russia) Bogdan Bobrov
March 9	Kolkata, India; Clay; M15; Singles and Doubles Draws				(India) Nitin Kumar Sinha (Ukraine) Eric Vanshelboim (India) Arjun Kadhe (India) Aryan Goveas (India) Dalwinder Singh (Belgium) Benjamin D'Hoe (India) Faisal Qamar (India) Manish Sureshkumar
March 9	Cancún, Mexico; Hard; M15; Singles and Doubles Draws				(Portugal) Gonçalo Oliveira (United States) Mwendwa Mbithi (Argentina) Maximiliano Estévez
March 9	Loulé, Portugal; Hard; M15; Singles and Doubles Draws				(Netherlands) Guy den Heijer (United States) Nicolas Moreno de Alboran (Australia) Maverick Banes (France) Evan Furness (United Kingdom) Billy Harris (Belgium) Gauthier Onclin (Italy) Matteo Arnaldi (Spain) Ricardo Ojeda Lara
March 9	Doha, Qatar; Hard; M15; Singles and Doubles Draws				(Netherlands) Gijs Brouwer (Ukraine) Marat Deviatiarov (Belgium) Zizou Bergs (Germany) Adrian Obert (Germany) Kai Wehnelt (Bulgaria) Alexandar Lazarov (Germany) Constantin Schmitz (Bosnia and Herzegovina) Aldin Šetkić
March 9	Kazan, Russia; Hard (indoor); M15; Singles and Doubles Draws				(Russia) Egor Agafonov (Russia) Marat Sharipov (Belarus) Ivan Liutarevich (Spain) David Jordà Sanchis (Russia) Evgeny Philippov (Uzbekistan) Sergey Fomin (Russia) Alexander Stepin (Uzbekistan) Jurabek Karimov
March 9	Monastir, Tunisia; Hard; M15; Singles and Doubles Draws			(Russia) Kirill Kivattsev (Brazil) Gilbert Klier Júnior	(Switzerland) Jeffrey von der Schulenburg (Russia) Savva Polukhin (Italy) Luca Giacomini (Russia) Vladimir Korolev (Tunisia) Majed Kilani (Tunisia) Aziz Ouakaa
March 9	Antalya, Turkey; Clay; M15; Singles and Doubles Draws			(Romania) Alexandru Jecan	(Spain) Sergi Pérez Contri (Kazakhstan) Timofei Skatov (Spain) Oriol Roca Batalla (Germany) Peter Heller (Czech Republic) Adam Pavlásek (Spain) Íñigo Cervantes (Germany) Peter Torebko
March 9	Antalya, Turkey; Clay; M15; Singles and Doubles Draws	(Spain) Íñigo Cervantes / (Spain) Oriol Roca Batalla vs (Germany) Peter Heller / (Germany) Peter Torebko		(Romania) Alexandru Jecan	(Spain) Sergi Pérez Contri (Kazakhstan) Timofei Skatov (Spain) Oriol Roca Batalla (Germany) Peter Heller (Czech Republic) Adam Pavlásek (Spain) Íñigo Cervantes (Germany) Peter Torebko
March 16	(Tournaments suspended due to the coronavirus pandemic.)				
March 23	(Tournaments suspended due to the coronavirus pandemic.)				
March 30	(Tournaments suspended due to the coronavirus pandemic.)				
