= Illa de sa Porrassa =

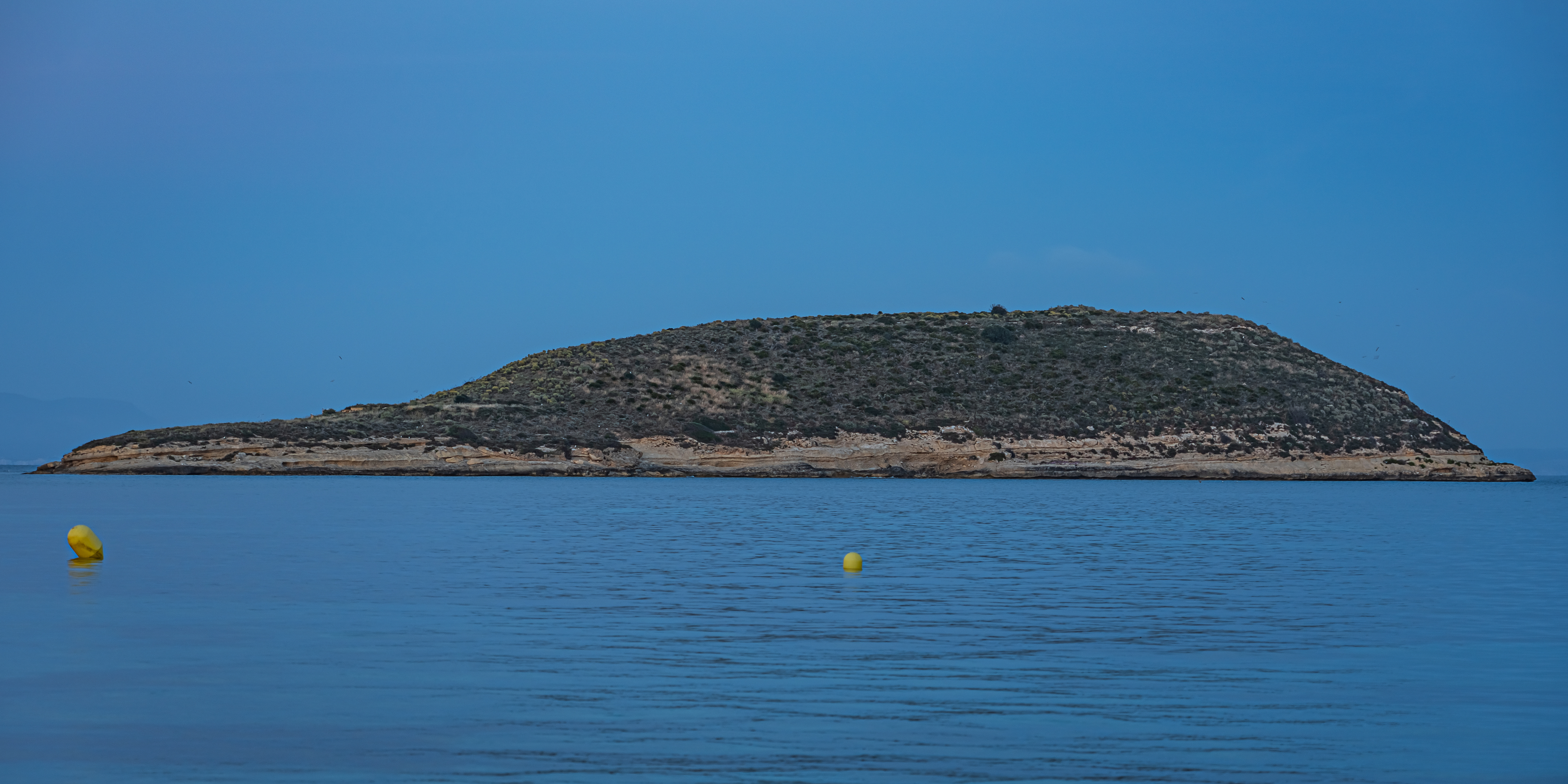
- Illa de Sa Porrassa

- Location in Spain

Geography
- Coordinates: 39°30′13″N 2°32′42″E
- Archipelago: Baleric Islands
- Length: 0.4 km (0.25 mi)
- Highest elevation: 36 m (118 ft)
- Autonomous Community: Balearic Islands
- Comarca: Serra de Tramuntana
- Municipality: Calvià

Demographics
- Population: 0

Illa de sa Porassa is an island located in the bay of the village of Magaluf, Mallorca, Spain.

== Features ==
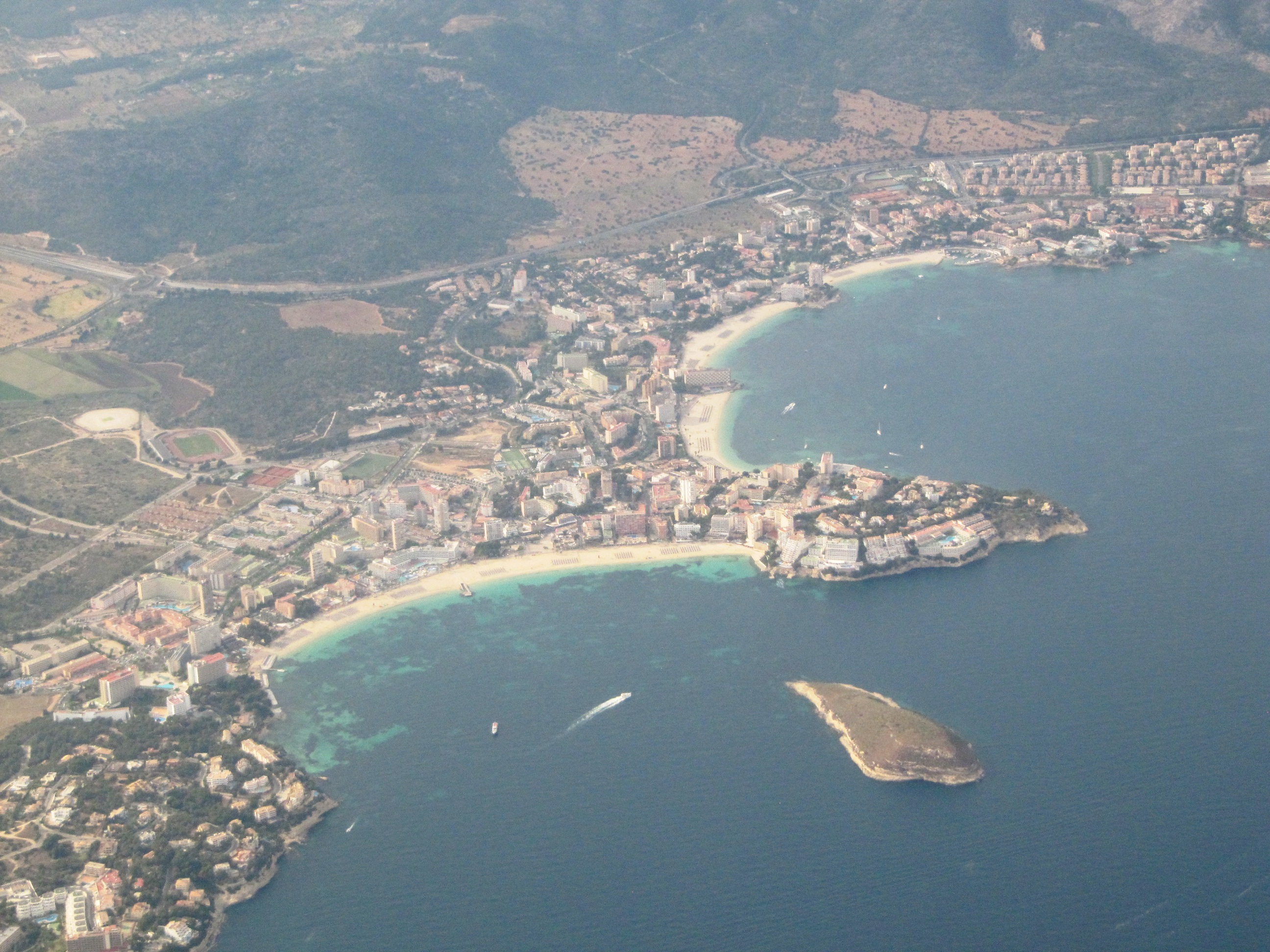
Sa Porrassa and Magaluf

Measuring over 400 meters (1,300 ft) across at its widest point, the island is a feature at the heart of Magaluf Bay. It is 36 m (118 ft) above sea level. The island is uninhabited, but visited during the summer season by many holidaymakers, either swimming, on personal water craft or on pedalboat from Magaluf Beach.

[2]
