= Magaluf =

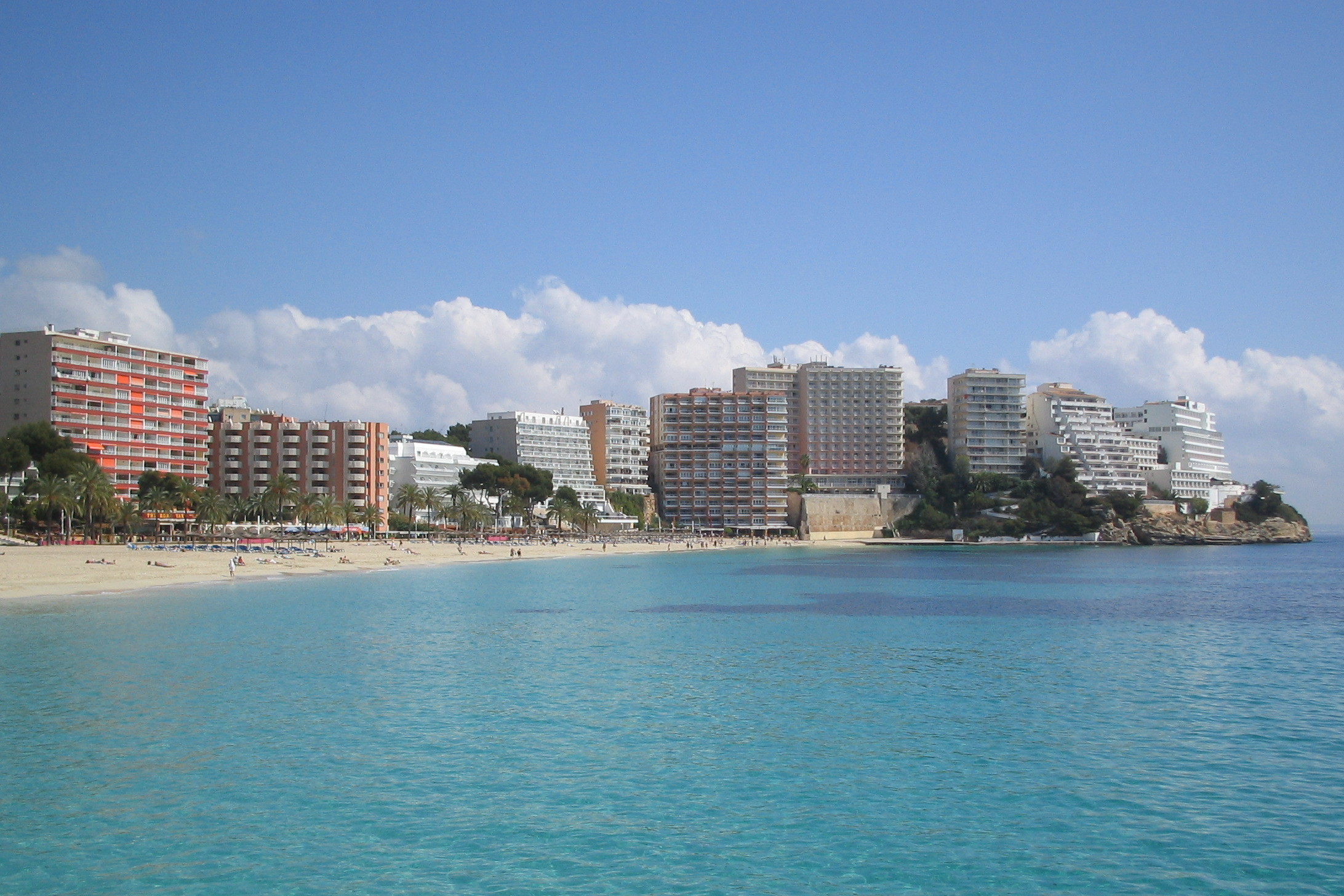
- Magaluf Beach

- Magaluf shown within Mallorca
- Coordinates: 39°30′39.6″N 2°32′15″E
- Sovereign state: Spain
- Autonomous community: Balearic Islands
- Province: Balearic Islands
- Island: Mallorca
- Comarca: Serra de Tramuntana
- Municipality: Calvià

Population (2009)
  - Total: 3,981
- Postal code: 07181
- Dialling code: 971

Magaluf (/mæɡəˈluːf/, Catalan: [məɣəˈluf], Spanish: [maɣaˈluf]) is a resort town on the western coast of the island of Mallorca. Known as a major tourist destination and holiday resort town, Magaluf is in the municipality of Calvià, which is likewise a popular package tour destination. The town is known for its nightlife.

== Resort ==
Magaluf is part of the municipality of Calvià and is located within a group of towns which includes Palma Nova and Torrenova. The resort caters to young (mainly British) adults and couples as well as families, with peak season during July and August. During the winter season (November through March), the population of Magaluf consists primarily of local residents, with most resort and package-based hotels closing their doors.

Magaluf consists of a white sandy beach and the Magaluf strip, which is the centre for the main nightlife and restaurants. The twin resorts of Magaluf and Palma Nova are the largest resort developments of the municipal district of Calvià, and are situated on the island's south west coast at the western end of the huge Palma Bay, approximately 15 kilometres (9 miles) from Palma, and the Son Sant Joan International airport. Meliá Hotels International started the required investment for the first stage in modernising the resort of Magaluf, by updating four hotels on the beach front, known as the Calvià Beach Resort, which opened in June 2012.

A popular challenge for tourists is a swim to Black Lizard Island (Illa de sa Porrassa) located in the centre of Magaluf Bay. The island is known by this name due to the very high number of black lizards that can be found scurrying away during one's climb. The island is situated right in the centre of Magaluf's bay and is approximately 400 m away from the beach front.

== Nightlife ==
There are many bars and nightclubs in Magaluf, and many DJs have played at the resort, including David Guetta, DJ Sammy, Freemasons, Basshunter, Judge Jules, Tiësto, Pat Sharp, Calvin Harris, Tim Westwood, Greg James, Martin Garrix and Lauren Pope. Night-life in Magaluf is centred on the Punta Balena strip, where most of the nightclubs and bars are located.

The nightlife and associated activities results in the town being commonly nicknamed "Shagaluf" and “Megamuff” in popular British culture.

The resort focuses almost exclusively on British binge drinking tourism, with extremely low alcohol and fast food prices, and British staffed medical emergency centres located close to bar areas.

British tour operators have warned the Spanish Tourist Board that the image of Magaluf is affecting their efforts to market Mallorca.

== Magaluf in popular culture ==
- Swedish pop musician Orup sang about the resort in 1992 in the song "Magaluf".
- English punk band Toy Dolls wrote a song called "I've Had Enough o' Magaluf".
- Belgian musician Maarten Devoldere clip "Mad World" has been one-shot in Magaluf.
