= Palma Nova =

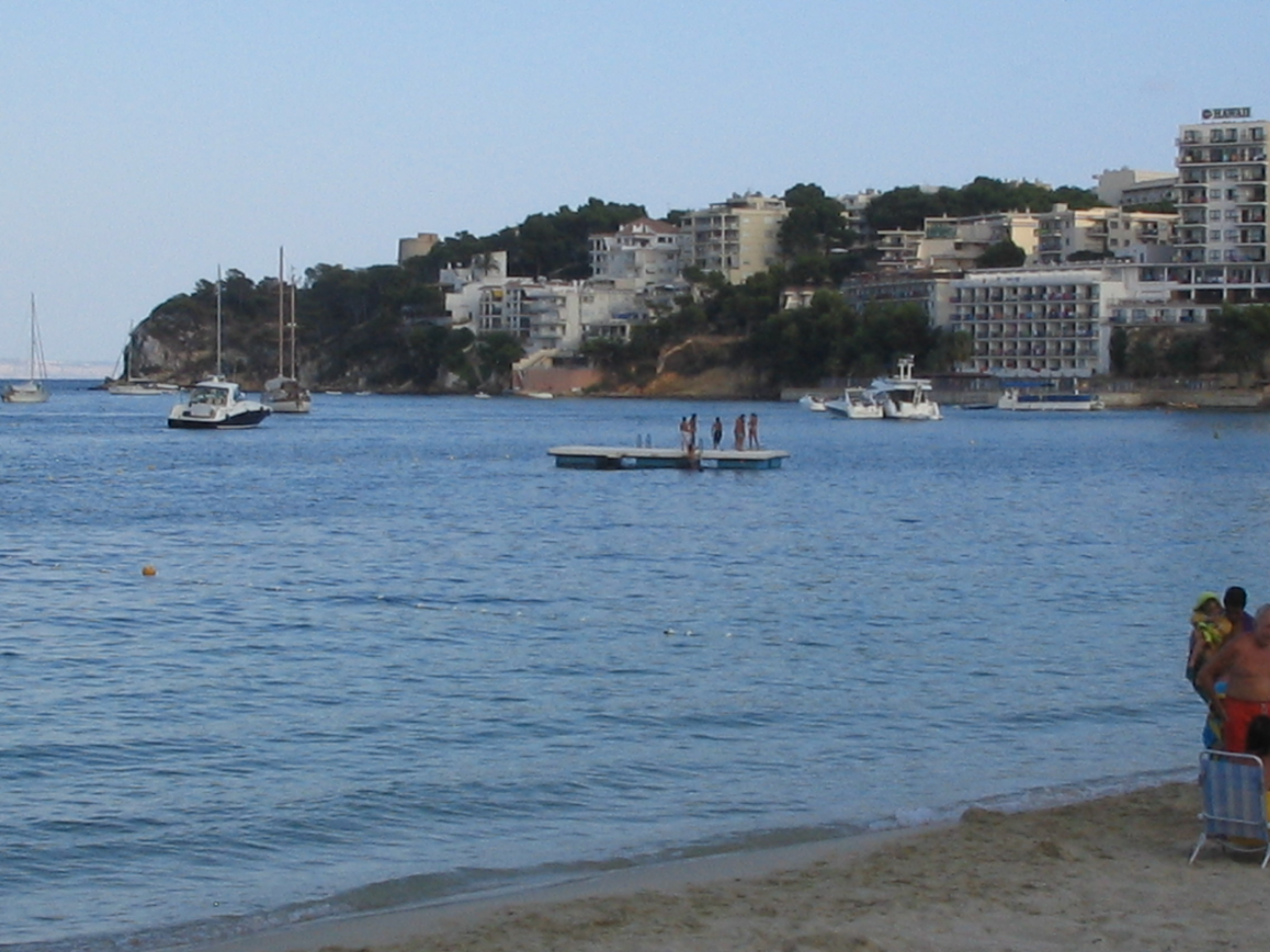
- Palma Nova Bay

- Palma Nova shown within Mallorca
- Coordinates: 39°31′15.24″N 2°32′13.52″E
- Sovereign state: Spain
- Autonomous community: Balearic Islands
- Province: Balearic Islands
- Island: Mallorca
- Comarca: Serra de Tramuntana
- Municipality: Calvià
- Postal code: 07181
- Dialling code: 971

Palma Nova (Balearic Catalan pronunciation: [ˈpalmə ˈnɔvə]; lit. 'new Palma') is a town in the municipality of Calvià on Mallorca, one of the Balearic Islands, Spain.

Palma Nova was one of the first purpose-built tourist destinations on the island, catering for all tastes. The town is frequented by a range of socio-economic groups due to the proximity to both the city of Palma and the resort of Magaluf. With the advent of low-cost airlines and package holidays, Palma Nova has grown to become a major holiday destination for Europeans.

== See also ==
- Palmanova beach

== Bibliography ==
- "Palma Nova Majorca - Map and Guide to Palma Nova".
