= Magaluf Beach =

Beach in Magaluf, Spain

Coordinates: 39°30′29″N 2°32′12″E

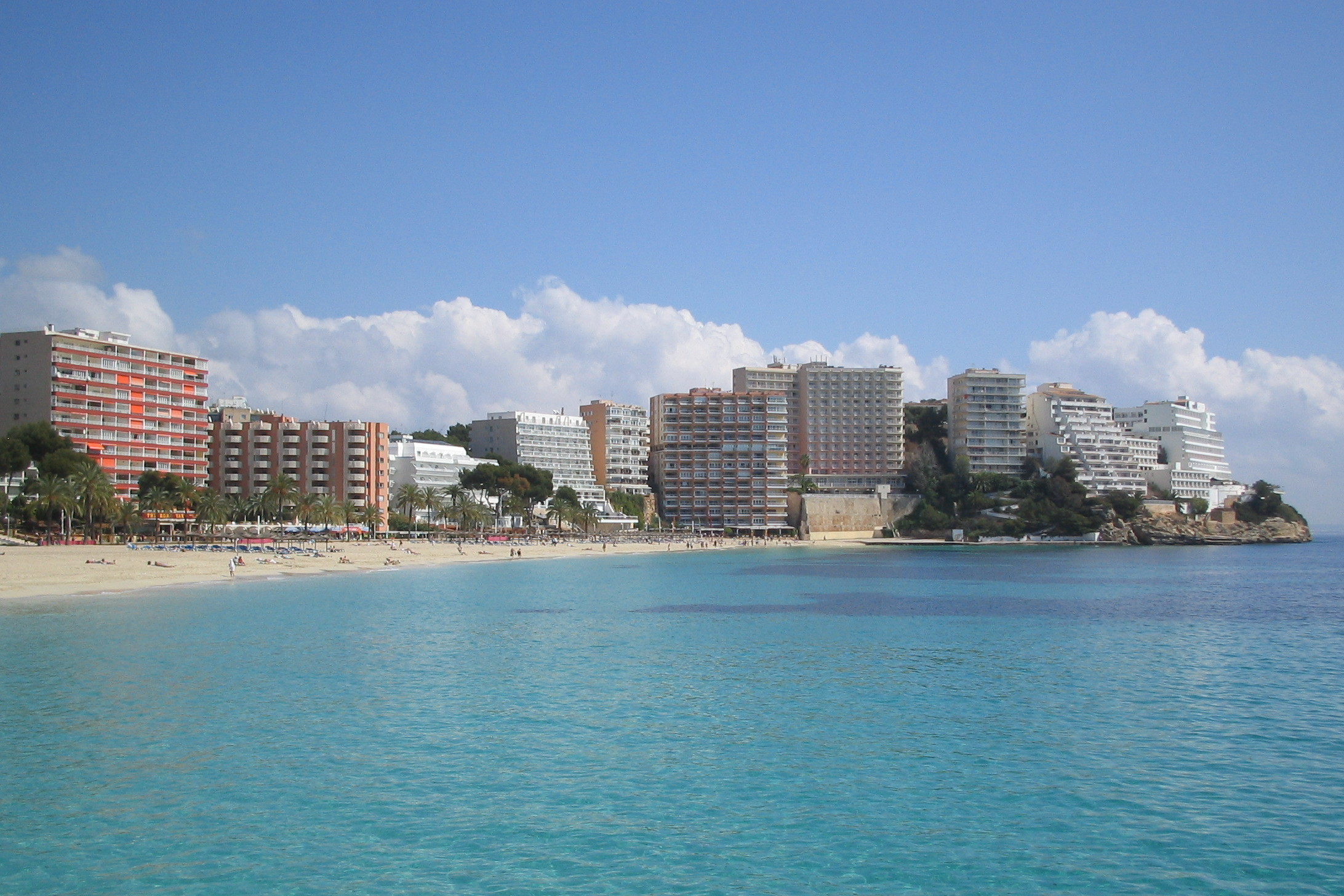
Platja de Magaluf

Magaluf Beach (Catalan: Platja de Magaluf, IPA: [ˈpladʒə ðə məɣəˈluf]; Spanish: Playa de Magaluf) is the name of the beach in the tourist resort of Magaluf. Holiday accommodation, nightclubs and other services aimed at mass tourism make up the urban landscape of the beach. It also receives a massive influx of local swimmers. Magaluf beach is one kilometer long and is made of fine white sand.

Originally, the beach landscape was an unattractive looking marshland, its current state is the product of artificial regeneration. A half mile from the coast of Magalluf beach is Porrassa Islet, which served as a refuge for the fleet of King James I before he landed in Santa Ponsa in 1229. The area north of the bay is open to winds from the east-southeast to the anchoring of boats on sandy and algae to a depth ranging between two and five meters. Islet Porrassa protects the beach from wind, although a little wind blows in from the east.

== Hotels ==
=== Hotel Sol Jamaica ===
Located in the tourist and commercial center of Magaluf, 50 meters from the beach. Near the hotel are several leisure and entertainment attractions; the discothèque BCM, Casino, Aquapark, Western Park and several golf clubs.

=== Aparthotel Hm Royal Beach ===
The apartment complex, fully air-conditioned, has 6 floors with a total of 210 lodgings. Offers a wide lobby with lifts, reception 24 hours, TV room, a café, a cozy bar and restaurant. As additional features offers a laundry service, parking and club and playground.

=== Hotel Samos ===
The hotel was built in 1970 and renovated in 2002, has nine floors and a total of 417 double rooms. It is fully air-conditioned and has a lobby with a reception area open 24 hours that offers a safe, currency exchange and cloakroom. It also has a bar, a café, a nightclub, a TV room and an air-conditioned restaurant. It also has a club and playground for children. The host may use the conference room and Internet terminal as well as the basement for bike rental and service of these (charges apply). The hotel has a parking garage.

=== Hotel Sol Magalluf Park ===
The building was completely renovated in 2000. The hotel has a total of 422 double rooms spread over ten floors. It has a 1,000 m^{2} garden with pool, a large lobby and a reception area open 24 hours that offers a currency exchange service. It also has a café, a pub and an air-conditioned restaurant. The hotel has a conference room. The hotel also offers bicycle rental service, parking and mini club for younger guests.

=== Hotel Sol Guadalupe ===
The building was renovated in 2008. It has nine floors and a total of 503 rooms, of which 48 are singles. It has a pool-bar, a lagoon and gardens, a large lobby and a reception area open 24 hours that offers a safe and money exchange. There is also a games room, a café, a cozy bar, a pub, an air-conditioned restaurant and a TV room. The hotel also has parking and a medical service. A playground and two children's pools also exist.

=== Aparthotel Vista Sol ===
This complex, situated within a garden of 1,500 square meters, has nine floors with a total of 176 apartments. Guests have the use of a small market and a safe and currency exchange. There is also a bar, a cafeteria, a conference room and a restaurant. The hotel has an own parking.
