= 2021 Wimbledon Championships – Girls' singles =

Girls' singles
- 2021 Wimbledon Championships

Final
- Champion: (Spain) Ane Mintegi del Olmo
- Runner-up: (Germany) Nastasja Schunk
- Score: 2–6, 6–4, 6–1

Events
Singles	men	women		boys	girls
Doubles	men	women	mixed	boys	girls
WC Singles	men	women	quad	boys	girls
WC Doubles	men	women	quad	boys	girls
- Wimbledon Championships

Ane Mintegi del Olmo won the title, defeating Nastasja Schunk in the final, 2–6, 6–4, 6–1.

Daria Snigur was the defending champion having won the previous edition in 2019. She participated in the women's singles qualifying competition, losing to Beatriz Haddad Maia in the first round.

== Seeds ==
1. (Andorra) Victoria Jiménez Kasintseva (semifinals)
2. (Philippines) Alex Eala (second round)
3. (Russia) Diana Shnaider (first round)
4. (Russia) Polina Kudermetova (second round)
5. (France) Océane Babel (second round)
6. (Belarus) Kristina Dmitruk (quarterfinals)
7. (United States) Alexandra Yepifanova (second round)
8. (Czech Republic) Linda Fruhvirtová (semifinals)

9. (United States) Madison Sieg (first round)
10. (United States) Elvina Kalieva (second round)
11. (Indonesia) Priska Madelyn Nugroho (second round)
12. (Peru) Dana Guzmán (first round)
13. (United Kingdom) Matilda Mutavdzic (third round)
14. (Greece) Michaela Laki (first round)
15. (Germany) Mara Guth (quarterfinals)
16. (Mexico) Julia García (second round)

Click on the seed number of a player to go to their draw section.

== Draw ==
Key

- Q = Qualifier
- WC = Wild card
- LL = Lucky loser
- Alt = Alternate
- ITF = ITF entry
- PR = Protected ranking
- SR = Special ranking
- SE = Special exempt
- JE = Junior exempt
- JR = Junior Accelerator Programme entrant
- CO = College Accelerator Programme entrant
- NG = Next Gen Accelerator Program entrant
- w/o = Walkover
- r = Retired
- d = Defaulted

=== Finals ===
Quarterfinals
1	(Andorra) Victoria Jiménez Kasintseva	3	6	6
WC	(United Kingdom) Alicia Dudeney	6	2	1
(Germany) Nastasja Schunk	6	4	6
(Italy) Matilde Paoletti	3	6	2
8	(Czech Republic) Linda Fruhvirtová	6	6
15	(Germany) Mara Guth	3	2
6	(Belarus) Kristina Dmitruk	6^{6}	3
(Spain) Ane Mintegi del Olmo	7^{8}	6

Semifinals
1	(Andorra) Victoria Jiménez Kasintseva	4	6	4
(Germany) Nastasja Schunk	6	4	6
8	(Czech Republic) Linda Fruhvirtová	3	5
(Spain) Ane Mintegi del Olmo	6	7

Final
(Germany) Nastasja Schunk	6	4	1
(Spain) Ane Mintegi del Olmo	2	6	6

=== Top half ===
==== Section 1 ====
First round
1	(Andorra) Victoria Jiménez Kasintseva	6	6
(Italy) Beatrice Ricci	3	4
WC	(United Kingdom) Eva Shaw	6	6
Q	(Czech Republic) Nikola Bartůňková	1	3
(United States) Reese Brantmeier	6	6
(Germany) Nicole Rivkin	4	3
(Russia) Tatiana Barkova	3	3
16	(Mexico) Julia García	6	6
12	(Peru) Dana Guzmán	6^{10}	1
WC	(United Kingdom) Alicia Dudeney	7^{12}	6
(Belgium) Sofia Costoulas	5	6	6
(Japan) Erika Matsuda	7	2	0
SE	(Czech Republic) Linda Klimovičová	6	6
(Finland) Laura Hietaranta	4	1
(Russia) Alina Shcherbinina	6^{3}	2
7	(United States) Alexandra Yepifanova	7^{7}	6

Second round
1	(Andorra) V Jiménez Kasintseva	7^{7}	6
WC	(United Kingdom) E Shaw	6^{4}	4
(United States) R Brantmeier	4	6	6
16	(Mexico) J García	6	0	1
WC	(United Kingdom) A Dudeney	3	6	7^{7}
(Belgium) S Costoulas	6	1	6^{5}
SE	(Czech Republic) L Klimovičová	6	3	6
7	(United States) A Yepifanova	3	6	3

Third round
1	(Andorra) V Jiménez Kasintseva	4	7^{7}	6
(United States) R Brantmeier	6	6^{5}	4
WC	(United Kingdom) A Dudeney	6	6
SE	(Czech Republic) L Klimovičová	4	4

Quarterfinals
1	(Andorra) V Jiménez Kasintseva	3	6	6
WC	(United Kingdom) A Dudeney	6	2	1

==== Section 2 ====
First round
4	(Russia) Polina Kudermetova	6	1	6
WC	(United Kingdom) Mingge Xu	4	6	3
(United States) Valencia Xu	3	2
(Germany) Nastasja Schunk	6	6
Q	(Switzerland) Chelsea Fontenel	5	1
(Czech Republic) Darja Viďmanová	7	6
(Ukraine) Sabina Zeynalova	2	1
13	(United Kingdom) Matilda Mutavdzic	6	6
11	(Indonesia) Priska Madelyn Nugroho	6	6
(Czech Republic) Lucie Havlíčková	3	2
(Italy) Matilde Paoletti	6	4	6
(United States) Alexis Blokhina	4	6	4
WC	(United Kingdom) Amelia Bissett	4	4
(Belarus) Evialina Laskevich	6	6
(Slovakia) Radka Zelníčková	4	6	6^{4}
5	(France) Océane Babel	6	3	7^{7}

Second round
4	(Russia) P Kudermetova	4	6	0
(Germany) N Schunk	6	4	6
(Czech Republic) D Viďmanová	5	7^{7}	1
13	(United Kingdom) M Mutavdzic	7	6^{3}	6
11	(Indonesia) PM Nugroho	6^{1}	3
(Italy) M Paoletti	7^{7}	6
(Belarus) E Laskevich	7^{7}	6^{6}	6
5	(France) O Babel	6^{3}	7^{8}	4

Third round
(Germany) N Schunk	6	3	6
13	(United Kingdom) M Mutavdzic	0	6	2
(Italy) M Paoletti	6	1	6
(Belarus) E Laskevich	1	6	4

Quarterfinals
(Germany) N Schunk	6	4	6
(Italy) M Paoletti	3	6	2

=== Bottom half ===
==== Section 3 ====
First round
8	(Czech Republic) Linda Fruhvirtová	5	4
Q	(Canada) Kayla Cross	7	1^{r}
Q	(Denmark) Johanne Svendsen	3	3
(Croatia) Petra Marčinko	6	6
Q	(Russia) Elena Pridankina	6	6
(Belgium) Hanne Vandewinkel	3	2
WC	(United Kingdom) Isabelle Lacy	5	6	3
10	(United States) Elvina Kalieva	7	4	6
15	(Germany) Mara Guth	6	4	6
(Switzerland) Sebastianna Scilipoti	1	6	0
WC	(United Kingdom) Hephzibah Oluwadare	2	3
(Czech Republic) Sára Bejlek	6	6
Q	(Russia) Ksenia Zaytseva	6	6
(Serbia) Lola Radivojević	3	3
(United States) Ashlyn Krueger	7	7
3	(Russia) Diana Shnaider	5	5

Second round
8	(Czech Republic) L Fruhvirtová	6	6
(Croatia) P Marčinko	2	1
Q	(Russia) E Pridankina	6	6
10	(United States) E Kalieva	3	1
15	(Germany) M Guth	2	7^{7}	7
(Czech Republic) S Bejlek	6	6^{5}	5
Q	(Russia) K Zaytseva	6^{5}	3
(United States) A Krueger	7^{7}	6

Third round
8	(Czech Republic) L Fruhvirtová	6	6
Q	(Russia) E Pridankina	1	2
15	(Germany) M Guth	6	6
(United States) A Krueger	2	0

Quarterfinals
8	(Czech Republic) L Fruhvirtová	6	6
15	(Germany) M Guth	3	2

==== Section 4 ====
First round
6	(Belarus) Kristina Dmitruk	6	6
(Russia) Polina Iatcenko	2	2
(Germany) Julia Middendorf	7	6
Q	(Japan) Mei Hasegawa	5	2
Q	(Canada) Annabelle Xu	3	2
SE	(Czech Republic) Barbora Palicová	6	6
WC	(United Kingdom) Ranah Stoiber	5	6	6
9	(United States) Madison Sieg	7	4	2
14	(Greece) Michaela Laki	6	2	1
(United States) Elizabeth Coleman	1	6	6
WC	(United Kingdom) Kylie Bilchev	6	5	6
(Slovakia) Bianca Behúlová	0	7	1
(Italy) Eleonora Alvisi	1	0
(Spain) Ane Mintegi del Olmo	6	6
(Argentina) Solana Sierra	2	4
2	(Philippines) Alex Eala	6	6

Second round
6	(Belarus) K Dmitruk	6	4
(Germany) J Middendorf	0	0^{r}
SE	(Czech Republic) B Palicová	4	4
WC	(United Kingdom) R Stoiber	6	6
(United States) E Coleman	1	2
WC	(United Kingdom) K Bilchev	6	6
(Spain) A Mintegi del Olmo	3	6	7
2	(Philippines) A Eala	6	4	5

Third round
6	(Belarus) K Dmitruk	7^{7}	6
WC	(United Kingdom) R Stoiber	6^{2}	4
WC	(United Kingdom) K Bilchev	2	6	3
(Spain) A Mintegi del Olmo	6	4	6

Quarterfinals
6	(Belarus) K Dmitruk	6^{6}	3
(Spain) A Mintegi del Olmo	7^{8}	6

== Qualifying ==
=== Seeds ===
1. (Denmark) Johanne Svendsen (qualified)
2. (Russia) Ksenia Zaytseva (qualified)
3. (Canada) Annabelle Xu (qualified)
4. (Czech Republic) Nikola Bartůňková (qualified)
5. (Serbia) Tijana Sretenović (qualifying competition)
6. (France) Lucie Nguyen Tan (first round)
7. (Japan) Mei Hasegawa (qualified)
8. (Switzerland) Chelsea Fontenel (qualified)
9. (South Korea) Ku Yeon-woo (qualifying competition)
10. (Russia) Elena Pridankina (qualified)
11. (Russia) Anastasiia Gureva (qualifying competition)
12. (United States) Clervie Ngounoue (qualifying competition)
13. (Canada) Kayla Cross (qualified)
14. (France) Anaëlle Leclercq (qualifying competition)
15. (Kazakhstan) Tatyana Nikolenko (qualifying competition)
16. (Romania) Fatima Ingrid Amartha Keita (first round)

=== Qualifiers ===
1. (Denmark) Johanne Svendsen
2. (Russia) Ksenia Zaytseva
3. (Canada) Annabelle Xu
4. (Czech Republic) Nikola Bartůňková
5. (Russia) Elena Pridankina
6. (Canada) Kayla Cross
7. (Japan) Mei Hasegawa
8. (Switzerland) Chelsea Fontenel

=== Draw ===
==== First qualifier ====
First round
1	(Denmark) Johanne Svendsen	6	6
(United Kingdom) Jasmine Conway	2	1
(Germany) Laura Isabel Putz	2	0
9	(South Korea) Ku Yeon-woo	6	6

Qualifying competition
1	(Denmark) Johanne Svendsen	7^{7}	6
9	(South Korea) Ku Yeon-woo	6^{4}	4

==== Second qualifier ====
First round
2	(Russia) Ksenia Zaytseva	6	6
(Morocco) Yasmine Kabbaj	1	1
WC	(United Kingdom) Jessica Dawson	5	4
14	(France) Anaëlle Leclercq	7	6

Qualifying competition
2	(Russia) Ksenia Zaytseva	6	6
14	(France) Anaëlle Leclercq	1	2

==== Third qualifier ====
First round
3	(Canada) Annabelle Xu	6	6
WC	(United Kingdom) Issey Purser	0	3
WC	(United Kingdom) Sally Pethybridge	2	6	[7]
11	(Russia) Anastasiia Gureva	6	2	[10]

Qualifying competition
3	(Canada) Annabelle Xu	7	6
11	(Russia) Anastasiia Gureva	5	3

==== Fourth qualifier ====
First round
4	(Czech Republic) Nikola Bartůňková	7	7^{7}
(Russia) Yaroslava Bartashevich	5	6^{4}
(Sweden) Klara Milicevic	4	2
15	(Kazakhstan) Tatyana Nikolenko	6	6

Qualifying competition
4	(Czech Republic) Nikola Bartůňková	6	6
15	(Kazakhstan) Tatyana Nikolenko	0	3

==== Fifth qualifier ====
First round
5	(Serbia) Tijana Sretenović	6	7^{7}
WC	(United Kingdom) Jaquelyn Ogunwale	1	6^{5}
(United States) Isabelle Kouzmanov	1	2
10	(Russia) Elena Pridankina	6	6

Qualifying competition
5	(Serbia) Tijana Sretenović	3	0
10	(Russia) Elena Pridankina	6	6

==== Sixth qualifier ====
First round
6	(France) Lucie Nguyen Tan	3	1
(Turkey) Melisa Ercan	6	6
(United Kingdom) Kristina Paskauskas	2	2
13	(Canada) Kayla Cross	6	6

Qualifying competition
(Turkey) Melisa Ercan	5	3
13	(Canada) Kayla Cross	7	6

==== Seventh qualifier ====
First round
7	(Japan) Mei Hasegawa	6	6^{5}	[10]
(Netherlands) Melissa Boyden	3	7^{7}	[3]
WC	(United Kingdom) Sofia Johnson	1	2
12	(United States) Clervie Ngounoue	6	6

Qualifying competition
7	(Japan) Mei Hasegawa	3	6	[10]
12	(United States) Clervie Ngounoue	6	3	[4]

==== Eighth qualifier ====
First round
8	(Switzerland) Chelsea Fontenel	6	6
(Germany) Noma Noha Akugue	1	3
WC	(United Kingdom) Hannah Smith	6	6
16	(Romania) Fatima Ingrid Amartha Keita	2	1

Qualifying competition
8	(Switzerland) Chelsea Fontenel	6	6
WC	(United Kingdom) Hannah Smith	4	3
