= 2021 US Open – Girls' doubles =

Girls' doubles
- 2021 US Open

Final
- Champions: (United States) Ashlyn Krueger (United States) Robin Montgomery
- Runners-up: (United States) Reese Brantmeier (United States) Elvina Kalieva
- Score: 5–7, 6–3, [10–4]

Events
Singles	men	women		boys	girls
Doubles	men	women	mixed	boys	girls
WC Singles	men	women	quad
WC Doubles	men	women	quad
Legends	men	women	mixed
- US Open

Kamilla Bartone and Oksana Selekhmeteva were the defending champions, having won the previous edition in 2019, however Bartone was no longer eligible to participate in junior events, whilst Selekhmeteva chose not to participate.

Ashlyn Krueger and Robin Montgomery won the title, defeating Reese Brantmeier and Elvina Kalieva in the final, 5–7, 6–3, [10–4].

== Seeds ==
All seeds received a bye into the second round.

1. (Andorra) Victoria Jiménez Kasintseva / (Spain) Ane Mintegi del Olmo (semifinals)
2. (Belarus) Kristina Dmitruk / (Russia) Diana Shnaider (quarterfinals)
3. (United States) Ashlyn Krueger / (United States) Robin Montgomery (champions)
4. (Croatia) Petra Marčinko / (Hungary) Natália Szabanin (second round)
5. (Czech Republic) Brenda Fruhvirtová / (Czech Republic) Linda Fruhvirtová (quarterfinals)
6. (Philippines) Alex Eala / (Belgium) Hanne Vandewinkel (semifinals)
7. (Germany) Mara Guth / (Germany) Julia Middendorf (quarterfinals)
8. (United States) Reese Brantmeier / (United States) Elvina Kalieva (final)

== Draw ==
Key

- Q = Qualifier
- WC = Wild card
- LL = Lucky loser
- Alt = Alternate
- ITF = ITF entry
- PR = Protected ranking
- SR = Special ranking
- SE = Special exempt
- JE = Junior exempt
- JR = Junior Accelerator Programme entrant
- CO = College Accelerator Programme entrant
- NG = Next Gen Accelerator Program entrant
- w/o = Walkover
- r = Retired
- d = Defaulted

=== Finals ===
Semifinals
1	(Andorra) Victoria Jiménez Kasintseva (Spain) Ane Mintegi del Olmo	1	5
3	(United States) Ashlyn Krueger (United States) Robin Montgomery	6	7
6	(Philippines) Alex Eala (Belgium) Hanne Vandewinkel	7	2	[7]
8	(United States) Reese Brantmeier (United States) Elvina Kalieva	5	6	[10]

Final
3	(United States) Ashlyn Krueger (United States) Robin Montgomery	5	6	[10]
8	(United States) Reese Brantmeier (United States) Elvina Kalieva	7	3	[4]

=== Top half ===
First round
(United States) Clervie Ngounoue (United States) Charlotte Owensby	6	6
(Slovakia) Bianca Behúlová (Russia) Alina Shcherbinina	4	4
WC	(United States) Sarah Hamner (United States) Liv Hovde	6	3	[5]
(Thailand) Pimrada Jattavapornvanit (Canada) Annabelle Xu	4	6	[10]
(Belgium) Sofia Costoulas (Finland) Laura Hietaranta	2	4
(Mexico) Julia García (United Kingdom) Matilda Mutavdzic	6	6
(Canada) Marina Stakusic (Chinese Taipei) Yang Ya-yi	4	3
(United States) Ariana Pursoo (United States) Theadora Rabman	6	6

Second round
1	(Andorra) V Jiménez Kasintseva (Spain) A Mintegi del Olmo	6	2	[10]
(United States) C Ngounoue (United States) C Owensby	3	6	[7]
(Thailand) P Jattavapornvanit (Canada) A Xu	5	3
5	(Czech Republic) B Fruhvirtová (Czech Republic) L Fruhvirtová	7	6
3	(United States) A Krueger (United States) R Montgomery	6	6
(Mexico) J García (United Kingdom) M Mutavdzic	4	1
(United States) A Pursoo (United States) T Rabman	1	4
7	(Germany) M Guth (Germany) J Middendorf	6	6

Quarterfinals
1	(Andorra) V Jiménez Kasintseva (Spain) A Mintegi del Olmo	6	7^{7}
5	(Czech Republic) B Fruhvirtová (Czech Republic) L Fruhvirtová	4	6^{3}
3	(United States) A Krueger (United States) R Montgomery	4	6	[15]
7	(Germany) M Guth (Germany) J Middendorf	6	2	[13]

Semifinals
1	(Andorra) V Jiménez Kasintseva (Spain) A Mintegi del Olmo	1	5
3	(United States) A Krueger (United States) R Montgomery	6	7

=== Bottom half ===
First round
(Greece) Michaela Laki (Slovakia) Radka Zelníčková	6	7
WC	(United States) Tatum Evans (United States) Amelia Honer	0	5
(Argentina) Solana Sierra (Denmark) Johanne Svendsen	4	3
(United States) Elizabeth Coleman (United States) Madison Sieg	6	6
(Peru) Dana Guzmán (Czech Republic) Linda Klimovičová	7	6
(Croatia) Lucija Ćirić Bagarić (Switzerland) Sebastianna Scilipoti	5	4
(France) Océane Babel (Ukraine) Sabina Zeynalova
(United States) Alexis Blokhina (United States) Valencia Xu	w/o

Second round
6	(Philippines) A Eala (Belgium) H Vandewinkel	6	3	[10]
(Greece) M Laki (Slovakia) R Zelníčková	3	6	[6]
(United States) E Coleman (United States) M Sieg	6	6
4	(Croatia) P Marčinko (Hungary) N Szabanin	4	4
8	(United States) R Brantmeier (United States) E Kalieva	6	6
(Peru) D Guzmán (Czech Republic) L Klimovičová	2	4
(United States) A Blokhina (United States) V Xu	3	3
2	(Belarus) K Dmitruk (Russia) D Shnaider	6	6

Quarterfinals
6	(Philippines) A Eala (Belgium) H Vandewinkel	6	6^{4}	[10]
(United States) E Coleman (United States) M Sieg	1	7^{7}	[7]
8	(United States) R Brantmeier (United States) E Kalieva	7^{7}	6
2	(Belarus) K Dmitruk (Russia) D Shnaider	6^{5}	1

Semifinals
6	(Philippines) A Eala (Belgium) H Vandewinkel	7	2	[7]
8	(United States) R Brantmeier (United States) E Kalieva	5	6	[10]
