= 2021 US Open – Girls' singles =

Girls' singles
- 2021 US Open

Final
- Champion: (United States) Robin Montgomery
- Runner-up: (Belarus) Kristina Dmitruk
- Score: 6–2, 6–4

Events
Singles	men	women		boys	girls
Doubles	men	women	mixed	boys	girls
WC Singles	men	women	quad
WC Doubles	men	women	quad
Legends	men	women	mixed
- US Open

Camila Osorio was the defending champion, having won the previous edition in 2019, but was no longer eligible to participate in junior events. She participated in the women's singles event, but lost to Ons Jabeur in the second round.

Robin Montgomery won the title, defeating Kristina Dmitruk in the final, 6–2, 6–4.

== Seeds ==
All seeds received a bye into the second round.

1. (Andorra) Victoria Jiménez Kasintseva (quarterfinals)
2. (Philippines) Alex Eala (quarterfinals)
3. (Russia) Diana Shnaider (second round)
4. (Spain) Ane Mintegi del Olmo (second round)
5. (Czech Republic) Linda Fruhvirtová (third round)
6. (Belarus) Kristina Dmitruk (final)
7. (United States) Robin Montgomery (champion)
8. (France) Océane Babel (second round)

9. (Hungary) Natália Szabanin (third round)
10. (United States) Madison Sieg (second round)
11. (Germany) Mara Guth (second round)
12. (United States) Elvina Kalieva (quarterfinals)
13. (United Kingdom) Matilda Mutavdzic (third round)
14. (Peru) Dana Guzmán (second round, retired)
15. (Greece) Michaela Laki (third round)
16. (United States) Ashlyn Krueger (second round)

Click on the seed number of a player to go to their draw section.

== Draw ==
Key

- Q = Qualifier
- WC = Wild card
- LL = Lucky loser
- Alt = Alternate
- ITF = ITF entry
- PR = Protected ranking
- SR = Special ranking
- SE = Special exempt
- JE = Junior exempt
- JR = Junior Accelerator Programme entrant
- CO = College Accelerator Programme entrant
- NG = Next Gen Accelerator Program entrant
- w/o = Walkover
- r = Retired
- d = Defaulted

=== Finals ===
Quarterfinals
1	(Andorra) Victoria Jiménez Kasintseva	3	2
7	(United States) Robin Montgomery	6	6
(Argentina) Solana Sierra	4	6	7^{7}
12	(United States) Elvina Kalieva	6	3	6^{5}
6	(Belarus) Kristina Dmitruk	6	3	6
(Croatia) Petra Marčinko	3	6	3
(Switzerland) Sebastianna Scilipoti	7	6
2	(Philippines) Alex Eala	5	3

Semifinals
7	(United States) Robin Montgomery	2	6	6
(Argentina) Solana Sierra	6	3	4
6	(Belarus) Kristina Dmitruk	6	6
(Switzerland) Sebastianna Scilipoti	1	2

Final
7	(United States) Robin Montgomery	6	6
6	(Belarus) Kristina Dmitruk	2	4

=== Top half ===
==== Section 1 ====
First round
Q	(United States) Theadora Rabman	7	6
(Finland) Laura Hietaranta	5	2
WC	(United States) Liv Hovde	2	6	2
(Belarus) Jana Kolodynska	6	1	6
(Russia) Alina Shcherbinina	6^{7}	6	6
WC	(United States) Amelia Honer	7^{9}	4	4
Q	(Canada) Annabelle Xu	6	6
(Belgium) Hanne Vandewinkel	0	3

Second round
1	(Andorra) V Jiménez Kasintseva	6	6
Q	(United States) T Rabman	1	0
(Belarus) J Kolodynska	6	0
14	(Peru) D Guzmán	2	0^{r}
9	(Hungary) N Szabanin	6	7^{7}
(Russia) A Shcherbinina	4	6^{5}
Q	(Canada) A Xu	2	0
7	(United States) R Montgomery	6	6

Third round
1	(Andorra) V Jiménez Kasintseva	6^{5}	6	6
(Belarus) J Kolodynska	7^{7}	3	4
9	(Hungary) N Szabanin	2	7	4
7	(United States) R Montgomery	6	5	6

Quarterfinals
1	(Andorra) V Jiménez Kasintseva	3	2
7	(United States) R Montgomery	6	6

==== Section 2 ====
First round
WC	(United States) Sarah Hamner	3	1
(Argentina) Solana Sierra	6	6
WC	(United States) Tatum Evans	2	1
Q	(Croatia) Lucija Ćirić Bagarić	6	6
(Slovakia) Radka Zelníčková	3	1
(United States) Reese Brantmeier	6	6
(United States) Clervie Ngounoue	6	6
(Germany) Julia Middendorf	3	3

Second round
4	(Spain) A Mintegi del Olmo	6	5	3
(Argentina) S Sierra	4	7	6
Q	(Croatia) L Ćirić Bagarić	3	1
13	(United Kingdom) M Mutavdzic	6	6
12	(United States) E Kalieva	6	6
(United States) R Brantmeier	3	3
(United States) C Ngounoue	0	2
5	(Czech Republic) L Fruhvirtová	6	6

Third round
(Argentina) S Sierra	3	6	7^{7}
13	(United Kingdom) M Mutavdzic	6	4	6^{4}
12	(United States) E Kalieva	7^{7}	6
5	(Czech Republic) L Fruhvirtová	6^{3}	4

Quarterfinals
(Argentina) S Sierra	4	6	7^{7}
12	(United States) E Kalieva	6	3	6^{5}

=== Bottom half ===
==== Section 3 ====
First round
(Denmark) Johanne Svendsen	7	6
Q	(United States) Valencia Xu	5	2
(Czech Republic) Linda Klimovičová	5	1
LL	(United States) Katja Wiersholm	7	6
Q	(Chinese Taipei) Yang Ya-yi	4	6^{7}
(Croatia) Petra Marčinko	6	7^{9}
(United States) Alexis Blokhina	7^{8}	6
(Mexico) Julia García	6^{6}	0

Second round
6	(Belarus) K Dmitruk	6	6^{5}	6
(Denmark) J Svendsen	3	7^{7}	2
LL	(United States) K Wiersholm	5	6	6
11	(Germany) M Guth	7	4	1
16	(United States) A Krueger	6	4	3
(Croatia) P Marčinko	3	6	6
(United States) A Blokhina	6	7^{7}
3	(Russia) D Shnaider	2	6^{5}

Third round
6	(Belarus) K Dmitruk	6	6
LL	(United States) K Wiersholm	4	1
(Croatia) P Marčinko	7	6
(United States) A Blokhina	5	1

Quarterfinals
6	(Belarus) K Dmitruk	6	3	6
(Croatia) P Marčinko	3	6	3

==== Section 4 ====
First round
(Switzerland) Sebastianna Scilipoti	6	1	6
WC	(United States) Eleana Yu	3	6	4
(Belgium) Sofia Costoulas	5
(Ukraine) Sabina Zeynalova	4^{r}
(Slovakia) Bianca Behúlová	2	6	3
(United States) Elizabeth Coleman	6	2	6
Q	(Thailand) Pimrada Jattavapornvanit	1	6^{3}
WC	(United States) Charlotte Owensby	6	7^{7}

Second round
8	(France) O Babel	4	7^{7}	3
(Switzerland) S Scilipoti	6	6^{0}	6
(Belgium) S Costoulas	6	3	6
10	(United States) M Sieg	3	6	3
15	(Greece) M Laki	6	6
(United States) E Coleman	0	4
WC	(United States) C Owensby	3	3
2	(Philippines) A Eala	6	6

Third round
(Switzerland) S Scilipoti	7^{8}	7^{7}
(Belgium) S Costoulas	6^{6}	6^{5}
15	(Greece) M Laki	6	5	4
2	(Philippines) A Eala	4	7	6

Quarterfinals
(Switzerland) S Scilipoti	7	6
2	(Philippines) A Eala	5	3

== Qualifying ==
=== Seeds ===
1. (Czech Republic) Brenda Fruhvirtová (first round)
2. (Russia) Mirra Andreeva (qualifying competition)
3. (Croatia) Lucija Ćirić Bagarić (qualified)
4. (United States) Valencia Xu (qualified)
5. (Canada) Annabelle Xu (qualified)
6. (Canada) Victoria Mboko (first round)
7. (Thailand) Pimrada Jattavapornvanit (qualified)
8. (Switzerland) Chelsea Fontenel (first round)
9. (Japan) Erika Matsuda (first round)
10. (Chinese Taipei) Yang Ya-yi (qualified)
11. (Mexico) Alejandra Cruz (qualifying competition)
12. (Canada) Marina Stakusic (qualifying competition)

=== Qualifiers ===
1. (Chinese Taipei) Yang Ya-yi
2. (Thailand) Pimrada Jattavapornvanit
3. (Croatia) Lucija Ćirić Bagarić
4. (United States) Valencia Xu
5. (Canada) Annabelle Xu
6. (United States) Theadora Rabman

=== Lucky loser ===
1. (United States) Katja Wiersholm

=== Draw ===
==== First qualifier ====
First round
1	(Czech Republic) Brenda Fruhvirtová	2	4
WC	(United States) Ariana Pursoo	6	6
(Netherlands) Clarine Lerby	3	4
10	(Chinese Taipei) Yang Ya-yi	6	6

Qualifying competition
WC	(United States) Ariana Pursoo	7^{7}	2	[11]
10	(Chinese Taipei) Yang Ya-yi	6^{4}	6	[13]

==== Second qualifier ====
First round
2	(Russia) Mirra Andreeva	6	6
(United States) Qavia Lopez	0	1
(Romania) Fatima Ingrid Amartha Keita	4	0
7	(Thailand) Pimrada Jattavapornvanit	6	6

Qualifying competition
2	(Russia) Mirra Andreeva	4	5
7	(Thailand) Pimrada Jattavapornvanit	6	7

==== Third qualifier ====
First round
3	(Croatia) Lucija Ćirić Bagarić	6	6
(Algeria) Inès Bekrar	0	1
(United States) Alexia Harmon	1	2
12	(Canada) Marina Stakusic	6	6

Qualifying competition
3	(Croatia) Lucija Ćirić Bagarić	6	3	[10]
12	(Canada) Marina Stakusic	2	6	[7]

==== Fourth qualifier ====
First round
4	(United States) Valencia Xu	6	6
(Kazakhstan) Tatyana Nikolenko	3	4
(Canada) Mia Kupres	4	6	[11]
9	(Japan) Erika Matsuda	6	3	[9]

Qualifying competition
4	(United States) Valencia Xu	6	7^{7}
(Canada) Mia Kupres	3	6^{1}

==== Fifth qualifier ====
First round
5	(Canada) Annabelle Xu	6	6
(United Kingdom) Kylie Bilchev	4	2
WC	(United States) Katja Wiersholm	6	6
8	(Switzerland) Chelsea Fontenel	2	4

Qualifying competition
5	(Canada) Annabelle Xu	6	6
WC	(United States) Katja Wiersholm	3	3

==== Sixth qualifier ====
First round
6	(Canada) Victoria Mboko	3	6	[4]
WC	(United States) Theadora Rabman	6	2	[10]
WC	(Japan) Yuina Igarashi	1	2
11	(Mexico) Alejandra Cruz	6	6

Qualifying competition
WC	(United States) Theadora Rabman	6	6^{4}	[10]
11	(Mexico) Alejandra Cruz	1	7^{7}	[1]
