= 2021 Wimbledon Championships – Girls' doubles =

Girls' doubles
- 2021 Wimbledon Championships

Final
- Champions: (Belarus) Kristina Dmitruk (Russia) Diana Shnaider
- Runners-up: (Belgium) Sofia Costoulas (Finland) Laura Hietaranta
- Score: 6–1, 6–2

Events
Singles	men	women		boys	girls
Doubles	men	women	mixed	boys	girls
WC Singles	men	women	quad
WC Doubles	men	women	quad
← 2019 ·	Wimbledon Championships	· 2022 →

Kristina Dmitruk and Diana Shnaider won the title, defeating Sofia Costoulas and Laura Hietaranta in the final, 6–1, 6–2.

Savannah Broadus and Abigail Forbes were the defending champions from when the event was last held in 2019, but were no longer eligible to participate in junior tournaments.

== Seeds ==
1. (Belarus) Kristina Dmitruk / (Russia) Diana Shnaider (champions)
2. (Czech Republic) Linda Fruhvirtová / (Russia) Polina Kudermetova (semifinals)
3. (Philippines) Alex Eala / (Indonesia) Priska Madelyn Nugroho (second round)
4. (Andorra) Victoria Jiménez Kasintseva / (Spain) Ane Mintegi del Olmo (first round)
5. (Mexico) Julia García / (Peru) Dana Guzmán (first round)
6. (Germany) Mara Guth / (Germany) Julia Middendorf (second round, withdrew)
7. (Russia) Polina Iatcenko / (Croatia) Petra Marčinko (first round)
8. (United States) Elizabeth Coleman / (United States) Madison Sieg (quarterfinals)

== Draw ==
=== Key ===
- Q = Qualifier
- WC = Wild card
- LL = Lucky loser
- Alt = Alternate
- ITF = ITF entry
- PR = Protected ranking
- SR = Special ranking
- SE = Special exempt
- JE = Junior exempt
- JR = Junior Accelerator Programme entrant
- CO = College Accelerator Programme entrant
- NG = Next Gen Accelerator Program entrant
- w/o = Walkover
- r = Retired
- d = Defaulted

=== Finals ===
Semifinals
1	(Belarus) Kristina Dmitruk (Russia) Diana Shnaider	6	6
(United States) Reese Brantmeier (United States) Elvina Kalieva	3	2
(Belgium) Sofia Costoulas (Finland) Laura Hietaranta	2	6	[10]
2	(Czech Republic) Linda Fruhvirtová (Russia) Polina Kudermetova	6	2	[8]

Final
1	(Belarus) Kristina Dmitruk (Russia) Diana Shnaider	6	6
(Belgium) Sofia Costoulas (Finland) Laura Hietaranta	1	2

=== Top half ===
First round
1	(Belarus) Kristina Dmitruk (Russia) Diana Shnaider	6	6
WC	(United Kingdom) Jessica Dawson (United Kingdom) Alicia Dudeney	3	2
(Czech Republic) Nikola Bartůňková (Czech Republic) Barbora Palicová	4	6	[13]
(United States) Clervie Ngounoue (United States) Alexandra Yepifanova	6	3	[15]
(Russia) Elena Pridankina (Russia) Ksenia Zaytseva	6	7^{7}
(Argentina) Solana Sierra (Denmark) Johanne Svendsen	1	6^{4}
(Canada) Kayla Cross (Canada) Annabelle Xu	6	4	[6]
6	(Germany) Mara Guth (Germany) Julia Middendorf	2	6	[10]
4	(Andorra) Victoria Jiménez Kasintseva (Spain) Ane Mintegi del Olmo	6^{5}	6	[8]
(United States) Reese Brantmeier (United States) Elvina Kalieva	7^{7}	2	[10]
WC	(United Kingdom) Kylie Bilchev (United Kingdom) Mingge Xu	2
(Greece) Michaela Laki (Serbia) Lola Radivojević	0^{r}
(Russia) Tatiana Barkova (United States) Alexis Blokhina	4	1
(Italy) Eleonora Alvisi (Italy) Matilde Paoletti	6	6
(Czech Republic) Darja Viďmanová (Slovakia) Radka Zelníčková	6	6
7	(Russia) Polina Iatcenko (Croatia) Petra Marčinko	3	3

Second round
1	(Belarus) K Dmitruk (Russia) D Shnaider	6	6
(United States) C Ngounoue (United States) A Yepifanova	2	2
(Russia) E Pridankina (Russia) K Zaytseva	w/o
6	(Germany) M Guth (Germany) J Middendorf
(United States) R Brantmeier (United States) E Kalieva	6	6
WC	(United Kingdom) K Bilchev (United Kingdom) M Xu	4	2
(Italy) E Alvisi (Italy) M Paoletti
(Czech Republic) D Viďmanová (Slovakia) R Zelníčková	w/o

Quarterfinals
1	(Belarus) K Dmitruk (Russia) D Shnaider	6	6
(Russia) E Pridankina (Russia) K Zaytseva	3	2
(United States) R Brantmeier (United States) E Kalieva	6	4	[11]
(Czech Republic) D Viďmanová (Slovakia) R Zelníčková	4	6	[9]

Semifinals
1	(Belarus) K Dmitruk (Russia) D Shnaider	6	6
(United States) R Brantmeier (United States) E Kalieva	3	2

=== Bottom half ===
First round
5	(Mexico) Julia García (Peru) Dana Guzmán	1	6	[6]
(Belgium) Sofia Costoulas (Finland) Laura Hietaranta	6	3	[10]
(Russia) Alina Shcherbinina (Ukraine) Sabina Zeynalova	6	6
(United Kingdom) Amelia Bissett (United Kingdom) Matilda Mutavdzic	4	1
(Switzerland) Chelsea Fontenel (United States) Ashlyn Krueger	7^{7}	6
(France) Océane Babel (Belarus) Evialina Laskevich	6^{2}	3
(Japan) Erika Matsuda (United States) Valencia Xu	0	0
3	(Philippines) Alex Eala (Indonesia) Priska Madelyn Nugroho	6	6
8	(United States) Elizabeth Coleman (United States) Madison Sieg	6	6
(Slovakia) Bianca Behúlová (Czech Republic) Linda Klimovičová	3	3
WC	(United Kingdom) Hephzibah Oluwadare (United Kingdom) Hannah Smith	2	3
(Germany) Nicole Rivkin (Belgium) Hanne Vandewinkel	6	6
(Czech Republic) Sára Bejlek (Czech Republic) Lucie Havlíčková	6	6
(France) Lucie Nguyen Tan (Switzerland) Sebastianna Scilipoti	4	1
WC	(United Kingdom) Eva Shaw (United Kingdom) Ranah Stoiber	6	3	[3]
2	(Czech Republic) Linda Fruhvirtová (Russia) Polina Kudermetova	3	6	[10]

Second round
(Belgium) S Costoulas (Finland) L Hietaranta	6	6
(Russia) A Shcherbinina (Ukraine) S Zeynalova	4	0
(Switzerland) C Fontenel (United States) A Krueger	6	4	[11]
3	(Philippines) A Eala (Indonesia) PM Nugroho	4	6	[9]
8	(United States) E Coleman (United States) M Sieg	6	4	[10]
(Germany) N Rivkin (Belgium) H Vandewinkel	3	6	[5]
(Czech Republic) S Bejlek (Czech Republic) L Havlíčková	3	7^{7}	[8]
2	(Czech Republic) L Fruhvirtová (Russia) P Kudermetova	6	6^{4}	[10]

Quarterfinals
(Belgium) S Costoulas (Finland) L Hietaranta	5	6	[10]
(Switzerland) C Fontenel (United States) A Krueger	7	3	[6]
8	(United States) E Coleman (United States) M Sieg	3	4
2	(Czech Republic) L Fruhvirtová (Russia) P Kudermetova	6	6

Semifinals
(Belgium) S Costoulas (Finland) L Hietaranta	2	6	[10]
2	(Czech Republic) L Fruhvirtová (Russia) P Kudermetova	6	2	[8]
