= 2021 Wimbledon Championships – Wheelchair women's doubles =

Wheelchair women's doubles
- 2021 Wimbledon Championships

Final
- Champions: (Japan) Yui Kamiji (United Kingdom) Jordanne Whiley
- Runners-up: (South Africa) Kgothatso Montjane (United Kingdom) Lucy Shuker
- Score: 6–0, 7–6^{(7–0)}

Events
Singles	men	women		boys	girls
Doubles	men	women	mixed	boys	girls
WC Singles	men	women	quad
WC Doubles	men	women	quad
← 2019 ·	Wimbledon Championships	· 2022 →

Yui Kamiji and Jordanne Whiley defeated Kgothatso Montjane and Lucy Shuker in the final, 6–0, 7–6^{(7–0)} to win the ladies' doubles wheelchair tennis title at the 2021 Wimbledon Championships.

Diede de Groot and Aniek van Koot were the defending champions, but were defeated by Montjane and Shuker in the semifinals. The defeat would lead to de Groot missing out on achieving a Golden Slam in wheelchair women's doubles, and achieving a Grand Slam in doubles for the second time (after 2019), as she would win the Australian Open, French Open, US Open, and gold at the Paralympics in the discipline that year.

== Seeds ==
1. (Netherlands) Diede de Groot / (Netherlands) Aniek van Koot (semifinals)
2. (Japan) Yui Kamiji / (United Kingdom) Jordanne Whiley (champions)

== Draw ==
=== Key ===
- Q = Qualifier
- WC = Wild card
- LL = Lucky loser
- Alt = Alternate
- ITF = ITF entry
- PR = Protected ranking
- SR = Special ranking
- SE = Special exempt
- JE = Junior exempt
- JR = Junior Accelerator Programme entrant
- CO = College Accelerator Programme entrant
- NG = Next Gen Accelerator Program entrant
- w/o = Walkover
- r = Retired
- d = Defaulted

=== Finals ===
Semifinals
1	(Netherlands) Diede de Groot (Netherlands) Aniek van Koot	3	6	5
(South Africa) Kgothatso Montjane (United Kingdom) Lucy Shuker	6	3	7
(Colombia) Angélica Bernal (Japan) Momoko Ohtani	1	2
2	(Japan) Yui Kamiji (United Kingdom) Jordanne Whiley	6	6

Final
(South Africa) Kgothatso Montjane (United Kingdom) Lucy Shuker	0	6^{0}
2	(Japan) Yui Kamiji (United Kingdom) Jordanne Whiley	6	7^{7}

== Sources ==
- WC Women's Doubles
