= 2021 Wimbledon Championships – Wheelchair women's singles =

Wheelchair women's singles
- 2021 Wimbledon Championships

Final
- Champion: (Netherlands) Diede de Groot
- Runner-up: (South Africa) Kgothatso Montjane
- Score: 6–2, 6–2

Details
- Draw: 8
- Seeds: 2

Events
Singles	men	women		boys	girls
Doubles	men	women	mixed	boys	girls
WC Singles	men	women	quad
WC Doubles	men	women	quad
← 2019 ·	Wimbledon Championships	· 2022 →

Diede de Groot defeated Kgothatso Montjane in the final, 6–2, 6–2 to win the ladies' singles wheelchair tennis title at the 2021 Wimbledon Championships. It was her third Wimbledon singles title, completed a non-calendar-year Grand Slam, and was the third step in an eventual Super Slam.

Aniek van Koot was the defending champion from when the event was last held in 2019, but was defeated in the quarterfinals by Jordanne Whiley.

== Seeds ==
1. (Netherlands) Diede de Groot (champion)
2. (Japan) Yui Kamiji (quarterfinals)

== Draw ==
=== Key ===
- Q = Qualifier
- WC = Wild card
- LL = Lucky loser
- Alt = Alternate
- ITF = ITF entry
- PR = Protected ranking
- SR = Special ranking
- SE = Special exempt
- JE = Junior exempt
- JR = Junior Accelerator Programme entrant
- CO = College Accelerator Programme entrant
- NG = Next Gen Accelerator Program entrant
- w/o = Walkover
- r = Retired
- d = Defaulted

=== Finals ===
Quarterfinals
1	(Netherlands) Diede de Groot	6	6
WC	(United Kingdom) Lucy Shuker	4	1
(Netherlands) Aniek van Koot	2	0
(United Kingdom) Jordanne Whiley	6	6
(South Africa) Kgothatso Montjane	6	2	6
(Colombia) Angélica Bernal	1	6	4
(Japan) Momoko Ohtani	6	6
2	(Japan) Yui Kamiji	3	4

Semifinals
1	(Netherlands) Diede de Groot	6	6
(United Kingdom) Jordanne Whiley	4	1
(South Africa) Kgothatso Montjane	7^{7}	4	6
(Japan) Momoko Ohtani	6^{3}	6	4

Final
1	(Netherlands) Diede de Groot	6	6
(South Africa) Kgothatso Montjane	2	2

== Sources ==
- WC Women's Singles
