= 2021 US Open – Wheelchair women's singles =

Wheelchair women's singles
- 2021 US Open

Final
- Champion: (Netherlands) Diede de Groot
- Runner-up: (Japan) Yui Kamiji
- Score: 6–3, 6–2

Details
- Draw: 8
- Seeds: 2

Events
Singles	men	women		boys	girls
Doubles	men	women	mixed	boys	girls
WC Singles	men	women	quad
WC Doubles	men	women	quad
Legends	men	women	mixed
← 2020 ·	US Open	· 2022 →

Three-time defending champion Diede de Groot defeated Yui Kamiji in the final, 6–3, 6–2 to win the women's singles wheelchair tennis title at the 2021 US Open. With the win, she completed the Golden Slam, becoming the first wheelchair tennis player to do so (alongside Dylan Alcott in the quad singles event).

== Seeds ==
1. (Netherlands) Diede de Groot (champion)
2. (Japan) Yui Kamiji (final)

== Draw ==
=== Key ===
- Q = Qualifier
- WC = Wild card
- LL = Lucky loser
- Alt = Alternate
- ITF = ITF entry
- PR = Protected ranking
- SR = Special ranking
- SE = Special exempt
- JE = Junior exempt
- JR = Junior Accelerator Programme entrant
- CO = College Accelerator Programme entrant
- NG = Next Gen Accelerator Program entrant
- w/o = Walkover
- r = Retired
- d = Defaulted

=== Finals ===
Quarterfinals
1	(Netherlands) Diede de Groot	6	6
(Colombia) Angélica Bernal	2	0
(Netherlands) Aniek van Koot	6	6
WC	(United States) Dana Mathewson	1	2
(Japan) Momoko Ohtani	1	7	3
(United Kingdom) Jordanne Whiley	6	5	6
(South Africa) Kgothatso Montjane	6^{12}	2
2	(Japan) Yui Kamiji	7^{14}	6

Semifinals
1	(Netherlands) Diede de Groot	6	6
(Netherlands) Aniek van Koot	1	0
(United Kingdom) Jordanne Whiley	1	3
2	(Japan) Yui Kamiji	6	6

Final
1	(Netherlands) Diede de Groot	6	6
2	(Japan) Yui Kamiji	3	2
