= 2021 US Open – Wheelchair quad singles =

Wheelchair quad singles
- 2021 US Open

Final
- Champion: (Australia) Dylan Alcott
- Runner-up: (Netherlands) Niels Vink
- Score: 7–5, 6–2

Events
Singles	men	women		boys	girls
Doubles	men	women	mixed	boys	girls
WC Singles	men	women	quad
WC Doubles	men	women	quad
Legends	men	women	mixed
← 2020 ·	US Open	· 2022 →

Dylan Alcott defeated Niels Vink in the final, 7–5, 6–2 to win the quad singles wheelchair tennis title at the 2021 US Open. With the win, Alcott completed the Golden Slam, becoming the first wheelchair tennis player to do so (alongside Diede de Groot in the women's singles event).

Sam Schröder was the defending champion, but was defeated in the quarterfinals by Vink. This was the first time that the quad singles used a knockout format at the US Open.

== Seeds ==
1. (Australia) Dylan Alcott (champion)
2. (Netherlands) Sam Schröder (quarterfinals)

== Draw ==
=== Key ===
- Q = Qualifier
- WC = Wild card
- LL = Lucky loser
- Alt = Alternate
- SE = Special exempt
- PR = Protected ranking
- ITF = ITF entry
- JE = Junior exempt
- w/o = Walkover
- r = Retired
- d = Defaulted
- SR = Special ranking

=== Finals ===
Quarterfinals
1	(Australia) Dylan Alcott	6	6
WC	(United States) Bryan Barten	0	1
(Japan) Koji Sugeno	6	4	6
(United States) David Wagner	4	6	4
(Australia) Heath Davidson	5	1
(United Kingdom) Andy Lapthorne	7	6
(Netherlands) Niels Vink	7^{7}	6
2	(Netherlands) Sam Schröder	6^{5}	4

Semifinals
1	(Australia) Dylan Alcott	6	6
(Japan) Koji Sugeno	2	1
(United Kingdom) Andy Lapthorne	6^{5}	1
(Netherlands) Niels Vink	7^{7}	6

Final
1	(Australia) Dylan Alcott	7	6
(Netherlands) Niels Vink	5	2
