= 2021 Wimbledon Championships – Men's singles =

Tennis tournament

Men's singles
- 2021 Wimbledon Championships

Final
- Champion: (Serbia) Novak Djokovic
- Runner-up: (Italy) Matteo Berrettini
- Score: 6–7^{(4–7)}, 6–4, 6–4, 6–3

Details
- Draw: 128
- Seeds: 32

Events
Singles	men	women		boys	girls
Doubles	men	women	mixed	boys	girls
WC Singles	men	women	quad	boys	girls
WC Doubles	men	women	quad	boys	girls
- Wimbledon Championships

Two-time defending champion Novak Djokovic defeated Matteo Berrettini in the final, 6–7^{(4–7)}, 6–4, 6–4, 6–3 to win the gentlemen's singles tennis title at the 2021 Wimbledon Championships. It was his sixth Wimbledon title and record-equaling 20th major men's singles title overall, tying Roger Federer and Rafael Nadal's all-time record total. Djokovic became the first man to win the Australian Open, French Open and Wimbledon titles in the same calendar year since Rod Laver in 1969, the second to achieve the Surface Slam (winning majors on three different surfaces in a calendar year), after Nadal in 2010, and the fifth in the Open Era to win the Channel Slam (French Open—Wimbledon double).

Djokovic and Daniil Medvedev were in contention for the world No. 1 singles ranking; Djokovic retained the top ranking when Medvedev lost in the fourth round.

This event marked the final professional singles appearance of 20-time major champion, eight-time Wimbledon champion, and former world No. 1 Roger Federer; he lost in the quarterfinals to Hubert Hurkacz. Federer was the oldest man in the Open Era to reach the Wimbledon quarterfinals, and the oldest man to reach a major quarterfinal since Ken Rosewall at the December 1977 Australian Open. His fourth-round victory marked 105 match wins at Wimbledon, a record that stood until Djokovic surpassed in 2026. The 18 quarterfinals he contested at Wimbledon remains a tournament record.

Berrettini was the first Italian man to reach a major final since Adriano Panatta at the 1976 French Open and the first to do so at Wimbledon. Hurkacz was the first Polish man to reach a major semifinal since Jerzy Janowicz in 2013. Zhang Zhizhen was the first Chinese man to qualify for the Wimbledon main draw in the Open Era. Márton Fucsovics was the first Hungarian to reach a men's singles major quarterfinal since Balázs Taróczy at the 1981 French Open, and the first to do so at Wimbledon since József Asbóth in 1948. This was the first time since 2017 that two-time champion Andy Murray participated. This marked the Wimbledon debuts of future world No. 1s and champions Carlos Alcaraz and Jannik Sinner; they lost to Medvedev and Fucsovics in the second and first rounds, respectively.

For the first time since 2002, the grass court seeding formula was abandoned and the standard ranking system based on the ATP rankings was permanently adopted, like at the other three majors.

== Seeds ==
1. (Serbia) Novak Djokovic (champion)
2. (Russia) Daniil Medvedev (fourth round)
3. (Greece) Stefanos Tsitsipas (first round)
4. (Germany) Alexander Zverev (fourth round)
5. (Russia) Andrey Rublev (fourth round)
6. (Switzerland) Roger Federer (quarterfinals)
7. (Italy) Matteo Berrettini (final)
8. (Spain) Roberto Bautista Agut (fourth round)
9. (Argentina) Diego Schwartzman (third round)
10. (Canada) Denis Shapovalov (semifinals)
11. (Spain) Pablo Carreño Busta (first round)
12. (Norway) Casper Ruud (first round)
13. (France) Gaël Monfils (second round)
14. (Poland) Hubert Hurkacz (semifinals)
15. (Australia) Alex de Minaur (first round)
16. (Canada) Félix Auger-Aliassime (quarterfinals)

17. (Chile) Cristian Garín (fourth round)
18. (Bulgaria) Grigor Dimitrov (second round)
19. (Italy) Jannik Sinner (first round)
20. (Russia) Aslan Karatsev (first round)
21. (France) Ugo Humbert (first round)
22. (United Kingdom) Daniel Evans (third round)
23. (Italy) Lorenzo Sonego (fourth round)
24. (Georgia (country)) Nikoloz Basilashvili (first round)
25. (Russia) Karen Khachanov (quarterfinals)
26. (Italy) Fabio Fognini (third round)
27. (United States) Reilly Opelka (first round)
28. (United States) John Isner (first round)
29. (United Kingdom) Cameron Norrie (third round)
30. (Spain) Alejandro Davidovich Fokina (first round)
31. (United States) Taylor Fritz (third round)
32. (Croatia) Marin Čilić (third round)

Click on the seed number of a player to go to their draw section.

== Draw ==
Key

- Q = Qualifier
- WC = Wild card
- LL = Lucky loser
- Alt = Alternate
- ITF = ITF entry
- PR = Protected ranking
- SR = Special ranking
- SE = Special exempt
- JE = Junior exempt
- JR = Junior Accelerator Programme entrant
- CO = College Accelerator Programme entrant
- NG = Next Gen Accelerator Program entrant
- w/o = Walkover
- r = Retired
- d = Defaulted

=== Finals ===
Quarterfinals
1	(Serbia) Novak Djokovic	6	6	6
(Hungary) Márton Fucsovics	3	4	4
25	(Russia) Karen Khachanov	4	6	7	1	4
10	(Canada) Denis Shapovalov	6	3	5	6	6
7	(Italy) Matteo Berrettini	6	5	7	6
16	(Canada) Félix Auger-Aliassime	3	7	5	3
6	(Switzerland) Roger Federer	3	6^{4}	0
14	(Poland) Hubert Hurkacz	6	7^{7}	6

Semifinals
1	(Serbia) Novak Djokovic	7^{7}	7	7
10	(Canada) Denis Shapovalov	6^{3}	5	5
7	(Italy) Matteo Berrettini	6	6	6^{3}	6
14	(Poland) Hubert Hurkacz	3	0	7^{7}	4

Final
1	(Serbia) Novak Djokovic	6^{4}	6	6	6
7	(Italy) Matteo Berrettini	7^{7}	4	4	3

=== Top half ===
==== Section 1 ====
First round
1	(Serbia) N Djokovic	4	6	6	6
WC	(United Kingdom) J Draper	6	1	2	2
Q	(Chile) T Barrios Vera	7^{7}	4	4	6^{4}
(South Africa) K Anderson	6^{4}	6	6	7^{7}
(Italy) A Seppi	4	6	7	6
(Portugal) J Sousa	6	4	5	2
Q	(United States) D Kudla	5	4	7^{7}	6	6
30	(Spain) A Davidovich Fokina	7	6	6^{4}	3	3
17	(Chile) C Garín	6^{6}	6	3	6	6
Q	(Spain) B Zapata Miralles	7^{8}	3	6	3	2
Q	(Australia) M Polmans	6	7	4	6
PR	(Chinese Taipei) Y-h Lu	2	5	6	1
(Spain) P Martínez	6	2	6	6
(Italy) S Travaglia	3	6	4	4
Q	(Australia) C O'Connell	6	2	6^{5}	6	4
13	(France) G Monfils	4	6	7^{7}	4	6

Second round
1	(Serbia) N Djokovic	6	6	6
(South Africa) K Anderson	3	3	3
(Italy) A Seppi	2	4	2
Q	(United States) D Kudla	6	6	6
17	(Chile) C Garín	7^{7}	6	2	7^{7}
Q	(Australia) M Polmans	6^{3}	2	6	6^{5}
(Spain) P Martínez	6	6	4	7^{7}
13	(France) G Monfils	3	4	6	6^{5}

Third round
1	(Serbia) N Djokovic	6	6	7^{9}
Q	(United States) D Kudla	4	3	6^{7}
17	(Chile) C Garín	6	6	4	6
(Spain) P Martínez	4	3	6	4

Fourth round
1	(Serbia) N Djokovic	6	6	6
17	(Chile) C Garín	2	4	2

==== Section 2 ====
First round
9	(Argentina) D Schwartzman	6	6	6
(France) B Paire	3	4	0
(Italy) M Cecchinato	3	4	0
WC	(United Kingdom) L Broady	6	6	6
(Czech Republic) J Veselý	6	7	7^{7}
(Germany) Y Hanfmann	1	5	6^{5}
(Hungary) M Fucsovics	5	6	7	6
19	(Italy) J Sinner	7	3	5	3
26	(Italy) F Fognini	7^{7}	6	6
(Spain) A Ramos Viñolas	6^{4}	2	4
(Uruguay) P Cuevas	7	4	4	4
(Serbia) L Đere	5	6	6	6
(South Africa) L Harris	6	6	7^{8}
(Lithuania) R Berankis	3	4	6^{6}
(Argentina) F Delbonis	6	4	1	2
5	(Russia) A Rublev	4	6	6	6

Second round
9	(Argentina) D Schwartzman	4	6	6	6
WC	(United Kingdom) L Broady	6	2	1	4
(Czech Republic) J Veselý	3	4^{r}
(Hungary) M Fucsovics	6	5
26	(Italy) F Fognini	6	6	0	6
(Serbia) L Đere	3	4	6	4
(South Africa) L Harris	1	2	5
5	(Russia) A Rublev	6	6	7

Third round
9	(Argentina) D Schwartzman	3	3	7^{8}	4
(Hungary) M Fucsovics	6	6	6^{6}	6
26	(Italy) F Fognini	3	7	4	2
5	(Russia) A Rublev	6	5	6	6

Fourth round
(Hungary) M Fucsovics	6	4	4	6	6
5	(Russia) A Rublev	3	6	6	0	3

==== Section 3 ====
First round
3	(Greece) S Tsitsipas	4	4	3
(United States) F Tiafoe	6	6	6
(Spain) R Carballés Baena	3	3	3
(Canada) V Pospisil	6	6	6
(Belarus) E Gerasimov	6	3	7^{7}	6
WC	(United Kingdom) J Clarke	3	6	6^{5}	2
Q	(United States) M McDonald	6	3	4	6^{3}
25	(Russia) K Khachanov	3	6	6	7^{7}
22	(United Kingdom) D Evans	7^{7}	6	7
(Spain) F López	6^{4}	2	5
(Serbia) D Lajović	6	7	3	4	6
(France) G Simon	4	5	6	6	3
Q	(China) Z Zhang	6	6^{5}	7^{7}	3	2
Q	(France) A Hoang	4	7^{7}	6^{5}	6	6
(United States) S Korda	6	6	6^{5}	7^{7}
15	(Australia) A de Minaur	3	4	7^{7}	6^{5}

Second round
(United States) F Tiafoe	6	6	6
(Canada) V Pospisil	4	4	4
(Belarus) E Gerasimov	1	6^{3}	3
25	(Russia) K Khachanov	6	7^{7}	6
22	(United Kingdom) D Evans	6	6	6
(Serbia) D Lajović	3	3	4
Q	(France) A Hoang	5	4	4
(United States) S Korda	7	6	6

Third round
(United States) F Tiafoe	3	4	4
25	(Russia) K Khachanov	6	6	6
22	(United Kingdom) D Evans	3	6	3	4
(United States) S Korda	6	3	6	6

Fourth round
25	(Russia) K Khachanov	3	6	6	5	10
(United States) S Korda	6	4	3	7	8

==== Section 4 ====
First round
10	(Canada) D Shapovalov	6	4	6	5	6
PR	(Germany) P Kohlschreiber	4	6	3	7	4
(France) P-H Herbert	6^{7}	6	6^{7}	7	6
(Spain) P Andújar	7^{9}	4	7^{9}	5	8
Q	(Germany) O Otte	4	6	6	6^{5}	13^{7}
Q	(France) A Rinderknech	6	3	2	7^{7}	12^{2}
WC	(United Kingdom) A Murray	6	6	5	6
24	(Georgia (country)) N Basilashvili	4	3	7	3
27	(United States) R Opelka	4	6^{3}	2
(Germany) D Koepfer	6	7^{7}	6
(South Korea) S-w Kwon	6^{2}	6	6	6
Q	(Germany) D Masur	7^{7}	3	4	4
(Argentina) F Bagnis	4	6	3	6^{1}
(Serbia) M Kecmanović	6	3	6	7^{7}
(Australia) J Millman	2	6	3	6^{4}
8	(Spain) R Bautista Agut	6	3	6	7^{7}

Second round
10	(Canada) D Shapovalov	w/o
(Spain) P Andújar
Q	(Germany) O Otte	3	6	6	4	2
WC	(United Kingdom) A Murray	6	4	4	6	6
(Germany) D Koepfer	6	6^{8}	7^{7}	5	6
(South Korea) S-w Kwon	3	7^{10}	6^{2}	7	3
(Serbia) M Kecmanović	3	3	7^{7}	6	3
8	(Spain) R Bautista Agut	6	6	6^{3}	3	6

Third round
10	(Canada) D Shapovalov	6	6	6
WC	(United Kingdom) A Murray	4	2	2
(Germany) D Koepfer	5	1	6^{4}
8	(Spain) R Bautista Agut	7	6	7^{7}

Fourth round
10	(Canada) D Shapovalov	6	6	7
8	(Spain) R Bautista Agut	1	3	5

=== Bottom half ===
==== Section 5 ====
First round
7	(Italy) M Berrettini	6	3	6	6
(Argentina) G Pella	4	6	4	0
LL	(Netherlands) B van de Zandschulp	6	6^{4}	6	7^{7}
Q	(France) G Barrère	2	7^{7}	1	6^{3}
(France) C Moutet	4	4	0
(Slovenia) A Bedene	6	6	6
(Japan) Y Nishioka	7^{7}	2	6	6^{3}	6
28	(United States) J Isner	6^{5}	6	3	7^{7}	4
20	(Russia) A Karatsev	6^{4}	6^{6}	3
(France) J Chardy	7^{7}	7^{8}	6
(Spain) J Munar	1	5	6^{5}
(Belarus) I Ivashka	6	7	7^{7}
(Japan) K Nishikori	6	6	6
(Australia) A Popyrin	4	4	4
(Australia) J Thompson	7^{8}	7^{7}	2	2	6
12	(Norway) C Ruud	6^{6}	6^{3}	6	6	2

Second round
7	(Italy) M Berrettini	6	6	7^{7}
LL	(Netherlands) B van de Zandschulp	3	4	6^{4}
(Slovenia) A Bedene	6	6	6
(Japan) Y Nishioka	1	0	2
(France) J Chardy	6	3	2	4
(Belarus) I Ivashka	4	6	6	6
(Japan) K Nishikori	5	4	7	3
(Australia) J Thompson	7	6	5	6

Third round
7	(Italy) M Berrettini	6	6	6
(Slovenia) A Bedene	4	4	4
(Belarus) I Ivashka	6	6	6
(Australia) J Thompson	4	4	4

Fourth round
7	(Italy) M Berrettini	6	6	6
(Belarus) I Ivashka	4	3	1

==== Section 6 ====
First round
16	(Canada) F Auger-Aliassime	6	6	6
(Brazil) T Monteiro	3	3	3
(France) J-W Tsonga	5	7^{7}	7	4	3
(Sweden) M Ymer	7	6^{4}	5	6	6
(Argentina) JI Londero	6^{3}	0	6	3
(Italy) G Mager	7^{7}	6	4	6
(Australia) N Kyrgios	6	4	3	6	9
21	(France) U Humbert	4	6	6	1	7
31	(United States) T Fritz	7	3	6	7
Q	(United States) B Nakashima	5	6	4	5
(United States) S Johnson	7^{9}	6	7
(Austria) D Novak	6^{7}	2	5
(United States) T Sandgren	6	6^{5}	6	6
(Slovakia) N Gombos	4	7^{7}	1	3
Q	(Netherlands) T Griekspoor	3	4	1
4	(Germany) A Zverev	6	6	6

Second round
16	(Canada) F Auger-Aliassime	6	4	7^{7}	6
(Sweden) M Ymer	4	6	6^{4}	1
(Italy) G Mager	6^{7}	4	4
(Australia) N Kyrgios	7^{9}	6	6
31	(United States) T Fritz	6	7^{7}	4	6^{4}	6
(United States) S Johnson	4	6^{4}	6	7^{7}	4
(United States) T Sandgren	5	2	3
4	(Germany) A Zverev	7	6	6

Third round
16	(Canada) F Auger-Aliassime	2	6	0
(Australia) N Kyrgios	6	1	0^{r}
31	(United States) T Fritz	7^{7}	4	3	6^{4}
4	(Germany) A Zverev	6^{3}	6	6	7^{7}

Fourth round
16	(Canada) F Auger-Aliassime	6	7^{8}	3	3	6
4	(Germany) A Zverev	4	6^{6}	6	6	4

==== Section 7 ====
First round
6	(Switzerland) R Federer	6	6^{3}	3	6	0
(France) A Mannarino	4	7^{7}	6	2	0^{r}
(France) R Gasquet	7^{7}	4	6	6
(Japan) Y Sugita	6^{4}	6	2	1
(Serbia) F Krajinović	6^{5}	4	5
WC	(Australia) A Bolt	7^{7}	6	7
(France) L Pouille	7^{8}	5	2	5
29	(United Kingdom) C Norrie	6^{6}	7	6	7
23	(Italy) L Sonego	6	7	6
(Portugal) P Sousa	2	5	0
(Colombia) DE Galán	6	4	7	7
(Argentina) F Coria	4	6	5	5
(Australia) J Duckworth	6	6	6
(Moldova) R Albot	4	4	1
(United States) S Querrey	7^{8}	6	7
11	(Spain) P Carreño Busta	6^{6}	4	5

Second round
6	(Switzerland) R Federer	7^{7}	6	6
(France) R Gasquet	6^{1}	1	4
WC	(Australia) A Bolt	3	1	2
29	(United Kingdom) C Norrie	6	6	6
23	(Italy) L Sonego	4	6	7^{7}	6
(Colombia) DE Galán	6	3	6^{3}	1
(Australia) J Duckworth	7	6^{4}	6	6
(United States) S Querrey	5	7^{7}	3	2

Third round
6	(Switzerland) R Federer	6	6	5	6
29	(United Kingdom) C Norrie	4	4	7	4
23	(Italy) L Sonego	6	6	6
(Australia) J Duckworth	3	4	4

Fourth round
6	(Switzerland) R Federer	7	6	6
23	(Italy) L Sonego	5	4	2

==== Section 8 ====
First round
14	(Poland) H Hurkacz	6	7^{7}	6
(Italy) L Musetti	4	6^{5}	1
(Finland) E Ruusuvuori	4	6	2	6	4
(United States) M Giron	6	2	6	0	6
(Kazakhstan) M Kukushkin	4	2	1
(Kazakhstan) A Bublik	6	6	6
(Spain) F Verdasco	6	3	4	4
18	(Bulgaria) G Dimitrov	3	6	6	6
32	(Croatia) M Čilić	7^{7}	7^{7}	6
(Italy) S Caruso	6^{5}	6^{1}	1
Q	(Argentina) M Trungelliti	1	6	6	3	4
Q	(France) B Bonzi	6	1	4	6	6
LL	(Japan) Y Uchiyama	3	7^{7}	2	6	3
WC	(Spain) C Alcaraz	6	6^{4}	6	3	6
(Germany) J-L Struff	4	1	6	6^{3}
2	(Russia) D Medvedev	6	6	4	7^{7}

Second round
14	(Poland) H Hurkacz	6	6	6
(United States) M Giron	3	2	4
(Kazakhstan) A Bublik	6	7^{8}	7^{7}
18	(Bulgaria) G Dimitrov	4	6^{6}	6^{4}
32	(Croatia) M Čilić	6	3	6	7^{7}
Q	(France) B Bonzi	4	6	3	6^{5}
WC	(Spain) C Alcaraz	4	1	2
2	(Russia) D Medvedev	6	6	6

Third round
14	(Poland) H Hurkacz	6	6	6
(Kazakhstan) A Bublik	3	4	2
32	(Croatia) M Čilić	7^{7}	6	3	3	2
2	(Russia) D Medvedev	6^{3}	3	6	6	6

Fourth round
14	(Poland) H Hurkacz	2	7^{7}	3	6	6
2	(Russia) D Medvedev	6	6^{2}	6	3	3

== Seeded players ==
The following are the seeded players. Seedings are based on ATP rankings as of 21 June 2021. Rankings and points are as before 28 June 2021. Players will count either their 2021 points or 50% of their 2019 points, whichever is greater.

Seed	Rank	Player	Points before	2019 Points defending	Points won	Points after	Status
1	1	(Serbia) Novak Djokovic	12,113	2,000	2,000	12,113	Champion, defeated (Italy) Matteo Berrettini [7]
2	2	(Russia) Daniil Medvedev	10,280	90	180	10,370	Fourth round lost to (Poland) Hubert Hurkacz [14]
3	4	(Greece) Stefanos Tsitsipas	7,980	10	10	8,150^{^}	First round lost to (United States) Frances Tiafoe
4	6	(Germany) Alexander Zverev	7,305	10	180	7,475	Fourth round lost to (Canada) Félix Auger-Aliassime [16]
5	7	(Russia) Andrey Rublev	6,120	45	180	6,255	Fourth round lost to (Hungary) Márton Fucsovics
6	8	(Switzerland) Roger Federer	4,815	1,200	360	4,215	Quarterfinals lost to (Poland) Hubert Hurkacz [14]
7	9	(Italy) Matteo Berrettini	4,468	180	1,200	5,488	Runner-up, lost to (Serbia) Novak Djokovic [1]
8	10	(Spain) Roberto Bautista Agut	3,125	720	180	2,765	Fourth round lost to (Canada) Denis Shapovalov [10]
9	11	(Argentina) Diego Schwartzman	3,060	90	90	3,060	Third round lost to (Hungary) Márton Fucsovics
10	12	(Canada) Denis Shapovalov	2,915	10	720	3,625	Semifinals lost to (Serbia) Novak Djokovic [1]
11	13	(Spain) Pablo Carreño Busta	2,905	10	10	2,905	First round lost to (United States) Sam Querrey
12	14	(Norway) Casper Ruud	2,690	10	10	2,690	First round lost to (Australia) Jordan Thompson
13	17	(France) Gaël Monfils	2,568	10	45	2,603	Second round lost to (Spain) Pedro Martínez
14	18	(Poland) Hubert Hurkacz	2,533	90	720	3,163	Semifinals lost to (Italy) Matteo Berrettini [7]
15	15	(Australia) Alex de Minaur	2,690	45	10	2,668	First round lost to (United States) Sebastian Korda
16	19	(Canada) Félix Auger-Aliassime	2,468	90	360	2,738	Quarterfinals lost to (Italy) Matteo Berrettini [7]
17	20	(Chile) Cristian Garín	2,440	10	180	2,610	Fourth round lost to (Serbia) Novak Djokovic [1]
18	21	(Bulgaria) Grigor Dimitrov	2,431	10	45	2,466	Second round lost to (Kazakhstan) Alexander Bublik
19	23	(Italy) Jannik Sinner	2,320	(35)^{†}	10	2,320^{^}	First round lost to (Hungary) Márton Fucsovics
20	24	(Russia) Aslan Karatsev	2,304	(15)^{†}	10	2,304^{^}	First round lost to (France) Jérémy Chardy
21	25	(France) Ugo Humbert	2,270	180	10	2,180	First round lost to (Australia) Nick Kyrgios
22	26	(United Kingdom) Dan Evans	2,151	90	90	2,151	Third round lost to (United States) Sebastian Korda
23	27	(Italy) Lorenzo Sonego	2,038	10	180	2,208	Fourth round lost to (Switzerland) Roger Federer [6]
24	28	(Georgia (country)) Nikoloz Basilashvili	1,985	45	10	1,975^{^}	First round lost to (United Kingdom) Andy Murray [WC]
25	29	(Russia) Karen Khachanov	1,965	90	360	2,235	Quarterfinals lost to (Canada) Denis Shapovalov [10]
26	31	(Italy) Fabio Fognini	1,868	90	90	1,868	Third round lost to (Russia) Andrey Rublev [5]
27	32	(United States) Reilly Opelka	1,806	90	10	1,761	First round lost to (Germany) Dominik Koepfer
28	33	(United States) John Isner	1,775	45	10	1,753	First round lost to (Japan) Yoshihito Nishioka
29	34	(United Kingdom) Cameron Norrie	1,770	45	90	1,815	Third round lost to (Switzerland) Roger Federer [6]
30	35	(Spain) Alejandro Davidovich Fokina	1,723	(20)^{†}	10	1,723^{^}	First round lost to (United States) Denis Kudla [Q]
31	40	(United States) Taylor Fritz	1,590	45	90	1,635	Third round lost to (Germany) Alexander Zverev [4]
32	37	(Croatia) Marin Čilić	1,660	45	90	1,705	Third round lost to (Russia) Daniil Medvedev [2]

† The player did not qualify for the tournament in 2019. Accordingly, points defending from the ATP Challenger Tour are deducted instead.
^ Because the 2021 tournament was non-mandatory, the player substituted his 19th best result in place of the points won in this tournament.

=== Withdrawn players ===
The following players would have been seeded, but withdrew before the tournament began. Only half of their defending points are deducted.

Rank	Player	Points before	Points defending	Points after	Withdrawal reason
3	(Spain) Rafael Nadal	8,630	720	8,270	Foot injury
5	(Austria) Dominic Thiem	7,425	10	7,425^{^}	Ongoing wrist injury
16	(Belgium) David Goffin	2,680	360	2,500	Ankle injury
22	(Canada) Milos Raonic	2,428	180	2,338	Ongoing calf injury
30	(Switzerland) Stan Wawrinka	1,944	45	1,922	Foot injury
36	(Croatia) Borna Ćorić	1,713	0	1,736^{^}	Shoulder surgery

^ Because the 2021 tournament was non-mandatory, the player substituted his 19th best result in place of the points won in this tournament.

== Other entry information ==
=== Wild card entries ===
The following players were awarded wild cards into the main draw.

- (Spain) Carlos Alcaraz
- (Australia) Alex Bolt
- (United Kingdom) Liam Broady
- (United Kingdom) Jay Clarke
- (United Kingdom) Jack Draper
- (United Kingdom) Andy Murray

=== Qualifiers ===
- (France) Grégoire Barrère
- (Chile) Marcelo Tomás Barrios Vera
- (France) Benjamin Bonzi
- (Netherlands) Tallon Griekspoor
- (France) Antoine Hoang
- (United States) Denis Kudla
- (Germany) Daniel Masur
- (United States) Mackenzie McDonald
- (United States) Brandon Nakashima
- (Australia) Christopher O'Connell
- (Germany) Oscar Otte
- (Australia) Marc Polmans
- (France) Arthur Rinderknech
- (Argentina) Marco Trungelliti
- (Spain) Bernabé Zapata Miralles
- (China) Zhang Zhizhen

=== Lucky losers ===
- (Japan) Yasutaka Uchiyama
- (Netherlands) Botic van de Zandschulp

=== Protected ranking ===
- (Chinese Taipei) Lu Yen-hsun (71)
- (Germany) Philipp Kohlschreiber (96)

=== Withdrawals ===
- ‡ (Switzerland) Stan Wawrinka (24) → replaced by (Colombia) Daniel Elahi Galán (103)
- ‡ (United Kingdom) Kyle Edmund (69) → replaced by (Italy) Marco Cecchinato (104)
- ‡ (Croatia) Borna Ćorić (30) → replaced by (Spain) Fernando Verdasco (105)
- ‡ (Spain) Rafael Nadal (3) → replaced by (Japan) Yūichi Sugita (107)
- ‡ (Belgium) David Goffin (13) → replaced by (Austria) Dennis Novak (108)
- ‡ (Canada) Milos Raonic (16) → replaced by (Portugal) Pedro Sousa (111) (Note: Last direct acceptance)
- @ (Austria) Dominic Thiem (4) → replaced by (Netherlands) Botic van de Zandschulp (LL)
- § (United States) Tommy Paul (53) → replaced by (Japan) Yasutaka Uchiyama (LL)

‡ – withdrew from entry list before qualifying began
@ – withdrew from entry list after qualifying began
§ – withdrew from main draw

== See also ==
- 2021 Wimbledon Championships – Day-by-day summaries

== Explanatory notes ==
Preceded by 2021 French Open – Men's singles	Grand Slam men's singles	Succeeded by 2021 US Open – Men's singles
