= 2021 US Open – Mixed doubles =

Mixed doubles
- 2021 US Open

Final
- Champions: (United States) Desirae Krawczyk (United Kingdom) Joe Salisbury
- Runners-up: (Mexico) Giuliana Olmos (El Salvador) Marcelo Arévalo
- Score: 7–5, 6–2

Details
- Draw: 32
- Seeds: 8

Events
Singles	men	women		boys	girls
Doubles	men	women	mixed	boys	girls
WC Singles	men	women	quad
WC Doubles	men	women	quad
Legends	men	women	mixed
- US Open

Desirae Krawczyk and Joe Salisbury defeated Giuliana Olmos and Marcelo Arévalo in the final, 7–5, 6–2 to win the mixed doubles tennis title at the 2021 US Open. By winning the title, Krawczyk and Salisbury received their third and second major mixed doubles title, respectively. Their victory together made Krawczyk the first player to win three consecutive mixed doubles major trophies since Mahesh Bhupathi in 2005 and 2006, and the seventh player in the Open Era to win three mixed doubles titles in a single season. Salisbury became the first man to win both the men's doubles and mixed doubles titles at the US Open in the same year since Bob Bryan in 2010.

Arévalo became the first player from Central America to reach a Grand Slam final.

Bethanie Mattek-Sands and Jamie Murray were the two-time defending champions, having won the most recent editions in 2018 and 2019, but lost in the first round to Andreja Klepač and Joran Vliegen.

== Seeds ==
1. (United States) Nicole Melichar-Martinez / (Croatia) Ivan Dodig (second round)
2. (United States) Desirae Krawczyk / (United Kingdom) Joe Salisbury (champions)
3. (Chile) Alexa Guarachi / (United Kingdom) Neal Skupski (quarterfinals)
4. (Brazil) Luisa Stefani / (Brazil) Marcelo Melo (first round)
5. (United States) Bethanie Mattek-Sands / (United Kingdom) Jamie Murray (first round)
6. (Japan) Ena Shibahara / (Japan) Ben McLachlan (second round)
7. (Chinese Taipei) Chan Hao-ching / (New Zealand) Michael Venus (first round)
8. (Netherlands) Demi Schuurs / (Belgium) Sander Gillé (quarterfinals)

== Draw ==
Key

- Q = Qualifier
- WC = Wild card
- LL = Lucky loser
- Alt = Alternate
- ITF = ITF entry
- PR = Protected ranking
- SR = Special ranking
- SE = Special exempt
- JE = Junior exempt
- JR = Junior Accelerator Programme entrant
- CO = College Accelerator Programme entrant
- NG = Next Gen Accelerator Program entrant
- w/o = Walkover
- r = Retired
- d = Defaulted

=== Finals ===
Semifinals
(Mexico) Giuliana Olmos (El Salvador) Marcelo Arévalo	4	6	[10]
Alt	(Ukraine) Dayana Yastremska (Australia) Max Purcell	6	4	[6]
(United States) Jessica Pegula (United States) Austin Krajicek	6^{2}	4
2	(United States) Desirae Krawczyk (United Kingdom) Joe Salisbury	7^{7}	6

Final
(Mexico) Giuliana Olmos (El Salvador) Marcelo Arévalo	5	2
2	(United States) Desirae Krawczyk (United Kingdom) Joe Salisbury	7	6

=== Top half ===
First round
1	(United States) N Melichar-Martinez (Croatia) I Dodig	7^{7}	4	[12]
(China) S Zhang (Australia) J Peers	6^{3}	6	[10]
WC	(United States) A Muhammad (United States) J Withrow	6^{5}	3
(Mexico) G Olmos (El Salvador) M Arévalo	7^{7}	6
Alt	(Australia) E Perez (Brazil) M Demoliner	6	6
WC	(United States) M Keys (United States) B Fratangelo	4	3
(Slovenia) A Klepač (Belgium) J Vliegen	2	6	[12]
5	(United States) B Mattek-Sands (United Kingdom) J Murray	6	4	[10]
4	(Brazil) L Stefani (Brazil) M Melo	5	7^{7}	[9]
(Canada) G Dabrowski (New Zealand) M Daniell	7	6^{3}	[11]
Alt	(Ukraine) D Yastremska (Australia) M Purcell	6	3	[10]
WC	(India) S Mirza (United States) R Ram	3	6	[7]
WC	(United States) R Brantmeier (United States) N Monroe	6	5	[11]
WC	(United States) S Vickery (United States) N Pasha	4	7	[13]
PR	(Kazakhstan) Y Shvedova (France) F Martin	6	3	[10]
7	(Chinese Taipei) H-c Chan (New Zealand) M Venus	4	6	[7]

Second round
1	(United States) N Melichar-Martinez (Croatia) I Dodig	5	6	[5]
(Mexico) G Olmos (El Salvador) M Arévalo	7	3	[10]
Alt	(Australia) E Perez (Brazil) M Demoliner	6^{4}	6	[10]
(Slovenia) A Klepač (Belgium) J Vliegen	7^{7}	4	[5]
(Canada) G Dabrowski (New Zealand) M Daniell	3	3
Alt	(Ukraine) D Yastremska (Australia) M Purcell	6	6
WC	(United States) S Vickery (United States) N Pasha	4	6	[9]
PR	(Kazakhstan) Y Shvedova (France) F Martin	6	4	[11]

Quarterfinals
(Mexico) G Olmos (El Salvador) M Arévalo	3	6	[10]
Alt	(Australia) E Perez (Brazil) M Demoliner	6	3	[4]
Alt	(Ukraine) D Yastremska (Australia) M Purcell	6	6
PR	(Kazakhstan) Y Shvedova (France) F Martin	2	3

Semifinals
(Mexico) G Olmos (El Salvador) M Arévalo	4	6	[10]
Alt	(Ukraine) D Yastremska (Australia) M Purcell	6	4	[6]

=== Bottom half ===
First round
6	(Japan) E Shibahara (Japan) B McLachlan	7	6
Alt	(United States) H Carter (United States) H Reese	5	2
(Czech Republic) L Hradecká (Poland) Ł Kubot	7^{7}	0	[9]
(United States) J Pegula (United States) A Krajicek	6^{4}	6	[11]
PR	(Kazakhstan) G Voskoboeva (Serbia) N Ćaćić	6	3	[10]
(Croatia) D Jurak (Netherlands) M Middelkoop	2	6	[8]
(Australia) S Stosur (Brazil) B Soares	7	3	[4]
3	(Chile) A Guarachi (United Kingdom) N Skupski	5	6	[10]
8	(Netherlands) D Schuurs (Belgium) S Gillé	6	6
WC	(United States) E Kalieva (United States) B Kuzuhara	4	3
WC	(United States) S Santamaria (United States) N Lammons	5	6^{6}
(Argentina) N Podoroska (Argentina) M González	7	7^{8}
(Australia) S Sanders (Australia) L Saville	4	4
(Switzerland) B Bencic (Slovakia) F Polášek	6	6
WC	(United States) J Loeb (United States) M Krueger	7	3	[8]
2	(United States) D Krawczyk (United Kingdom) J Salisbury	5	6	[10]

Second round
6	(Japan) E Shibahara (Japan) B McLachlan	6^{1}	3
(United States) J Pegula (United States) A Krajicek	7^{7}	6
PR	(Kazakhstan) G Voskoboeva (Serbia) N Ćaćić	7^{7}	1	[8]
3	(Chile) A Guarachi (United Kingdom) N Skupski	6^{4}	6	[10]
8	(Netherlands) D Schuurs (Belgium) S Gillé	w/o
(Argentina) N Podoroska (Argentina) M González
(Switzerland) B Bencic (Slovakia) F Polášek	6^{1}	5
2	(United States) D Krawczyk (United Kingdom) J Salisbury	7^{7}	7

Quarterfinals
(United States) J Pegula (United States) A Krajicek	6	6
3	(Chile) A Guarachi (United Kingdom) N Skupski	1	3
8	(Netherlands) D Schuurs (Belgium) S Gillé	1	6	[7]
2	(United States) D Krawczyk (United Kingdom) J Salisbury	6	1	[10]

Semifinals
(United States) J Pegula (United States) A Krajicek	6^{2}	4
2	(United States) D Krawczyk (United Kingdom) J Salisbury	7^{7}	6

== Other entry information ==
=== Wild cards ===
- (United States) Reese Brantmeier / (United States) Nicholas Monroe
- (United States) Elvina Kalieva / (United States) Bruno Kuzuhara
- (United States) Madison Keys / (United States) Bjorn Fratangelo
- (United States) Jamie Loeb / (United States) Mitchell Krueger
- (India) Sania Mirza / (United States) Rajeev Ram
- (United States) Asia Muhammad / (United States) Jackson Withrow
- (United States) Sabrina Santamaria / (United States) Nathaniel Lammons
- (United States) Sachia Vickery / (United States) Nathan Pasha

=== Protected ranking ===
- (Kazakhstan) Yaroslava Shvedova / (France) Fabrice Martin
- (Kazakhstan) Galina Voskoboeva / (Serbia) Nikola Ćaćić

=== Alternates ===
- (United States) Hayley Carter / (United States) Hunter Reese
- (Australia) Ellen Perez / (Brazil) Marcelo Demoliner
- (Ukraine) Dayana Yastremska / (Australia) Max Purcell

=== Withdrawals ===
- (Czech Republic) Květa Peschke / (Germany) Kevin Krawietz → replaced by (Ukraine) Dayana Yastremska / (Australia) Max Purcell
- (Kazakhstan) Elena Rybakina / (Kazakhstan) Andrey Golubev → replaced by (Australia) Ellen Perez / (Brazil) Marcelo Demoliner
- (Russia) Vera Zvonareva / (Germany) Tim Pütz → replaced by (United States) Hayley Carter / (United States) Hunter Reese

== See also ==
- 2021 US Open – Day-by-day summaries
