= 2021 Wimbledon Championships – Wheelchair quad doubles =

Wheelchair quad doubles
- 2021 Wimbledon Championships

Final
- Champions: (United Kingdom) Andy Lapthorne (United States) David Wagner
- Runners-up: (Australia) Dylan Alcott (Netherlands) Sam Schröder
- Score: 6–1, 3–6, 6–4

Events
Singles	men	women		boys	girls
Doubles	men	women	mixed	boys	girls
WC Singles	men	women	quad
WC Doubles	men	women	quad
← 2019 ·	Wimbledon Championships	· 2022 →

Defending champion Andy Lapthorne and his partner David Wagner defeated the other defending champion Dylan Alcott and his partner Sam Schröder in the final, 6–1, 3–6, 6–4 to win the quad doubles wheelchair tennis title at the 2021 Wimbledon Championships. With the win, Wagner completed the career Super Slam.

== Draw ==
=== Key ===
- Q = Qualifier
- WC = Wild card
- LL = Lucky loser
- Alt = Alternate
- SE = Special exempt
- PR = Protected ranking
- ITF = ITF entry
- JE = Junior exempt
- w/o = Walkover
- r = Retired
- d = Defaulted
- SR = Special ranking

=== Finals ===
Final
(Australia) Dylan Alcott (Netherlands) Sam Schröder	1	6	4
(United Kingdom) Andy Lapthorne (United States) David Wagner	6	3	6

== Sources ==
- WC Quad Doubles
