= 2021 US Open – Wheelchair men's doubles =

Wheelchair men's doubles
- 2021 US Open

Final
- Champions: (United Kingdom) Alfie Hewett (United Kingdom) Gordon Reid
- Runners-up: (Argentina) Gustavo Fernández (Japan) Shingo Kunieda
- Score: 6–2, 6–1

Events
Singles	men	women		boys	girls
Doubles	men	women	mixed	boys	girls
WC Singles	men	women	quad
WC Doubles	men	women	quad
Legends	men	women	mixed
← 2020 ·	US Open	· 2022 →

Four-time defending champions Alfie Hewett and Gordon Reid defeated Gustavo Fernández and Shingo Kunieda in the final, 6–2, 6–1 to win the men's doubles wheelchair tennis title at the 2021 US Open. With the win, they became the first men's doubles wheelchair team to complete the Grand Slam.

== Seeds ==
1. (United Kingdom) Alfie Hewett / (United Kingdom) Gordon Reid (champions)
2. (France) Stéphane Houdet / (France) Nicolas Peifer (semifinals)

== Draw ==
=== Key ===
- Q = Qualifier
- WC = Wild card
- LL = Lucky loser
- Alt = Alternate
- ITF = ITF entry
- PR = Protected ranking
- SR = Special ranking
- SE = Special exempt
- JE = Junior exempt
- JR = Junior Accelerator Programme entrant
- CO = College Accelerator Programme entrant
- NG = Next Gen Accelerator Program entrant
- w/o = Walkover
- r = Retired
- d = Defaulted

=== Finals ===
Semifinals
1	(United Kingdom) Alfie Hewett (United Kingdom) Gordon Reid	6	6
(Netherlands) Tom Egberink (United States) Casey Ratzlaff	1	0
(Argentina) Gustavo Fernández (Japan) Shingo Kunieda	6	6
2	(France) Stéphane Houdet (France) Nicolas Peifer	4	4

Final
1	(United Kingdom) Alfie Hewett (United Kingdom) Gordon Reid	6	6
(Argentina) Gustavo Fernández (Japan) Shingo Kunieda	2	1
