= 2021 Wimbledon Championships – Wheelchair men's singles =

Wheelchair men's singles
- 2021 Wimbledon Championships

Final
- Champion: (Belgium) Joachim Gérard
- Runner-up: (United Kingdom) Gordon Reid
- Score: 6–2, 7–6^{(7–2)}

Events
Singles	men	women		boys	girls
Doubles	men	women	mixed	boys	girls
WC Singles	men	women	quad
WC Doubles	men	women	quad
← 2019 ·	Wimbledon Championships	· 2022 →

Joachim Gérard defeated Gordon Reid in the final, 6–2, 7–6^{(7–2)} to win the gentlemen's singles wheelchair tennis title at the 2021 Wimbledon Championships.

Gustavo Fernández was the defending champion, but was defeated by Reid in the semifinals.

== Seeds ==
1. (Japan) Shingo Kunieda (quarterfinals)
2. (United Kingdom) Alfie Hewett (quarterfinals)

== Draw ==
=== Key ===
- Q = Qualifier
- WC = Wild card
- LL = Lucky loser
- Alt = Alternate
- ITF = ITF entry
- PR = Protected ranking
- SR = Special ranking
- SE = Special exempt
- JE = Junior exempt
- JR = Junior Accelerator Programme entrant
- CO = College Accelerator Programme entrant
- NG = Next Gen Accelerator Program entrant
- w/o = Walkover
- r = Retired
- d = Defaulted

=== Finals ===
Quarterfinals
1	(Japan) Shingo Kunieda	6	2	3
(United Kingdom) Gordon Reid	1	6	6
(France) Nicolas Peifer	2	4
(Argentina) Gustavo Fernández	6	6
WC	(Netherlands) Tom Egberink	7	2	1
(France) Stéphane Houdet	5	6	6
(Belgium) Joachim Gérard	7	3	6
2	(United Kingdom) Alfie Hewett	5	6	3

Semifinals
(United Kingdom) Gordon Reid	6	0	6
(Argentina) Gustavo Fernández	4	6	2
(France) Stéphane Houdet	5	6^{16}
(Belgium) Joachim Gérard	7	7^{18}

Final
(United Kingdom) Gordon Reid	2	6^{2}
(Belgium) Joachim Gérard	6	7^{7}

== Sources ==
- WC Men's Singles
