= 2021 US Open – Boys' singles =

Boys' singles
- 2021 US Open

Final
- Champion: (Spain) Daniel Rincón
- Runner-up: (China) Shang Juncheng
- Score: 6–2, 7–6^{(8–6)}

Events
Singles	men	women		boys	girls
Doubles	men	women	mixed	boys	girls
WC Singles	men	women	quad
WC Doubles	men	women	quad
Legends	men	women	mixed
- US Open

Jonáš Forejtek was the defending champion, having won the previous edition in 2019, but was no longer eligible to participate in junior events.

Daniel Rincón won the title, defeating Shang Juncheng in the final, 6–2, 7–6^{(8–6)}.

== Seeds ==
All seeds received a bye into the second round.

1. (China) Shang Juncheng (final)
2. (United States) Samir Banerjee (quarterfinals)
3. (Spain) Daniel Rincón (champion)
4. (United States) Bruno Kuzuhara (second round)
5. (United Kingdom) Jack Pinnington Jones (second round, retired)
6. (United States) Victor Lilov (quarterfinals)
7. (Ukraine) Viacheslav Bielinskyi (third round)
8. (Switzerland) Jérôme Kym (semifinals)

9. (Estonia) Mark Lajal (third round)
10. (France) Sean Cuenin (second round)
11. (France) Sascha Gueymard Wayenburg (semifinals)
12. (Peru) Gonzalo Bueno (second round)
13. (United States) Dali Blanch (second round)
14. (Spain) Alejandro Manzanera Pertusa (second round)
15. (Poland) Maks Kaśnikowski (third round)
16. (United States) Alexander Bernard (third round)

Click on the seed number of a player to go to their draw section.

== Draw ==
Key

- Q = Qualifier
- WC = Wild card
- LL = Lucky loser
- Alt = Alternate
- ITF = ITF entry
- PR = Protected ranking
- SR = Special ranking
- SE = Special exempt
- JE = Junior exempt
- JR = Junior Accelerator Programme entrant
- CO = College Accelerator Programme entrant
- NG = Next Gen Accelerator Program entrant
- w/o = Walkover
- r = Retired
- d = Defaulted

=== Finals ===
Quarterfinals
1	(China) Shang Juncheng	3	6	6
(Belgium) Pierre Yves Bailly	6	3	2
(Bulgaria) Petr Nesterov	6	4	4
11	(France) Sascha Gueymard Wayenburg	0	6	6
6	(United States) Victor Lilov	3	1
3	(Spain) Daniel Rincón	6	6
8	(Switzerland) Jérôme Kym	4	6	6
2	(United States) Samir Banerjee	6	3	4

Semifinals
1	(China) Shang Juncheng	6	6
11	(France) Sascha Gueymard Wayenburg	4	4
3	(Spain) Daniel Rincón	3	7^{7}	6
8	(Switzerland) Jérôme Kym	6	6^{4}	4

Final
1	(China) Shang Juncheng	2	6^{6}
3	(Spain) Daniel Rincón	6	7^{8}

=== Top half ===
==== Section 1 ====
First round
WC	(United States) Aidan Mayo	6	6
Q	(Portugal) Miguel Gomes	3	3
(Spain) Daniel Mérida	7^{7}	6
(Poland) Aleksander Orlikowski	6^{4}	3
(United States) Jack Anthrop	4	7^{7}	4
(Belgium) Pierre Yves Bailly	6	6^{2}	6
WC	(United States) Colton Smith	7^{7}	6
(Lithuania) Edas Butvilas	6^{4}	4

Second round
1	(China) J Shang	7^{7}	6
WC	(United States) A Mayo	6^{5}	3
(Spain) D Mérida	6	7^{7}
13	(United States) Dal Blanch	3	6^{2}
12	(Peru) G Bueno	0	3
(Belgium) PY Bailly	6	6
WC	(United States) C Smith	6^{5}	6	2
5	(United Kingdom) J Pinnington Jones	7^{7}	4	0^{r}

Third round
1	(China) J Shang	7^{7}	6
(Spain) D Mérida	6^{5}	4
(Belgium) PY Bailly	6	6
WC	(United States) C Smith	4	4

Quarterfinals
1	(China) J Shang	3	6	6
(Belgium) PY Bailly	6	3	2

==== Section 2 ====
First round
Q	(Czech Republic) Jakub Menšík	6	6
(Sweden) Måns Dahlberg	4	2
(Bulgaria) Petr Nesterov	6	6^{4}	6
Q	(Germany) Philip Florig	1	7^{7}	3
WC	(United States) Ryan Colby	7	4	4
(Ecuador) Álvano Guillén Meza	5	6	0^{r}
(United States) Ozan Colak	6^{5}	6	6^{9}
(Jordan) Abedallah Shelbayh	7^{7}	3	7^{11}

Second round
4	(United States) B Kuzuhara	3	6	3
Q	(Czech Republic) J Menšík	6	4	6
(Bulgaria) P Nesterov	6	6
14	(Spain) A Manzanera Pertusa	4	4
11	(France) S Gueymard Wayenburg	7^{7}	3	6
WC	(United States) R Colby	6^{3}	6	3
(Jordan) A Shelbayh	5	4
7	(Ukraine) V Bielinskyi	7	6

Third round
Q	(Czech Republic) J Menšík	6^{3}	4
(Bulgaria) P Nesterov	7^{7}	6
11	(France) S Gueymard Wayenburg	7	7^{7}
7	(Ukraine) V Bielinskyi	5	6^{3}

Quarterfinals
(Bulgaria) P Nesterov	6	4	4
11	(France) S Gueymard Wayenburg	0	6	6

=== Bottom half ===
==== Section 3 ====
First round
Q	(Slovenia) Sebastian Dominko	4	6	3
(Australia) Philip Sekulic	6	3	6
Q	(Peru) Christopher Li	6	4	6^{5}
WC	(United States) Alexander Razeghi	4	6	7^{7}
(France) Max Westphal	6	6
(Slovakia) Peter Benjamín Privara	4	3
WC	(United States) Aidan Kim	6	6
(United Kingdom) Lui Maxted	2	4

Second round
6	(United States) V Lilov	7^{7}	4	6
(Australia) P Sekulic	6^{2}	6	2
WC	(United States) A Razeghi	2	6	3
9	(Estonia) M Lajal	6	4	6
16	(United States) A Bernard	6	7^{7}
(France) M Westphal	3	6^{5}
WC	(United States) A Kim	6^{4}	5
3	(Spain) D Rincón	7^{7}	7

Third round
6	(United States) V Lilov	6	6
9	(Estonia) M Lajal	2	2
16	(United States) A Bernard	4	3
3	(Spain) D Rincón	6	6

Quarterfinals
6	(United States) V Lilov	3	1
3	(Spain) D Rincón	6	6

==== Section 4 ====
First round
(Peru) Ignacio Buse	7	6
WC	(United States) Michael Zheng	5	3
(Paraguay) Adolfo Daniel Vallejo	6	7
Q	(United States) Kyle Kang	4	5
(Croatia) Mili Poljičak	6	2	1
(United States) Ethan Quinn	2	6	6
(Germany) Max Hans Rehberg	4	6	7^{7}
(Sweden) Leo Borg	6	3	6^{4}

Second round
8	(Switzerland) J Kym	7^{7}	7
(Peru) I Buse	6^{3}	5
(Paraguay) AD Vallejo	6	3	6
10	(France) S Cuenin	3	6	3
15	(Poland) M Kaśnikowski	4	6	7^{7}
(United States) E Quinn	6	0	6^{4}
(Germany) MH Rehberg	0	4
2	(United States) S Banerjee	6	6

Third round
8	(Switzerland) J Kym	6	3	7^{7}
(Paraguay) AD Vallejo	3	6	6^{2}
15	(Poland) M Kaśnikowski	7	2	2
2	(United States) S Banerjee	5	6	6

Quarterfinals
8	(Switzerland) J Kym	4	6	6
2	(United States) S Banerjee	6	3	4

== Qualifying ==
=== Seeds ===
1. (North Macedonia) Kalin Ivanovski (first round)
2. (Hong Kong) Coleman Wong (qualifying competition)
3. (Lithuania) Vilius Gaubas (qualifying competition)
4. (Czech Republic) Adam Jurajda (first round)
5. (Czech Republic) Matthew William Donald (qualifying competition)
6. (Czech Republic) Jakub Menšík (qualified)
7. (Germany) Philip Florig (qualified)
8. (Ukraine) German Samofalov (first round)
9. (Brazil) João Victor Couto Loureiro (qualifying competition)
10. (Portugal) Miguel Gomes (qualified)
11. (Slovenia) Sebastian Dominko (qualified)
12. (Denmark) Elmer Møller (first round)

=== Qualifiers ===
1. (Germany) Philip Florig
2. (United States) Kyle Kang
3. (Portugal) Miguel Gomes
4. (Peru) Christopher Li
5. (Slovenia) Sebastian Dominko
6. (Czech Republic) Jakub Menšík

=== Draw ===
==== First qualifier ====
First round
1	(North Macedonia) Kalin Ivanovski	7	3	[3]
WC	(United States) Nicholas Heng	5	6	[10]
(United Kingdom) Derrick Chen	2	2
7	(Germany) Philip Florig	6	6

Qualifying competition
WC	(United States) Nicholas Heng	3	3^{r}
7	(Germany) Philip Florig	6	4

==== Second qualifier ====
First round
2	(Hong Kong) Coleman Wong	7	7
WC	(Japan) Yu Tanaka	5	5
WC	(United States) Kyle Kang	7	4	[10]
12	(Denmark) Elmer Møller	5	6	[6]

Qualifying competition
2	(Hong Kong) Coleman Wong	1	6	[5]
WC	(United States) Kyle Kang	6	3	[10]

==== Third qualifier ====
First round
3	(Lithuania) Vilius Gaubas	6	6
(United States) Azuma Visaya	3	4
(Israel) Orel Kimhi	5	5
10	(Portugal) Miguel Gomes	7	7

Qualifying competition
3	(Lithuania) Vilius Gaubas	6^{3}	6	[3]
10	(Portugal) Miguel Gomes	7^{7}	3	[10]

==== Fourth qualifier ====
First round
4	(Czech Republic) Adam Jurajda	4	3
(Peru) Christopher Li	6	6
(United States) Braden Shick	6^{5}	7^{7}	[3]
9	(Brazil) João Victor Couto Loureiro	7^{7}	6^{1}	[10]

Qualifying competition
(Peru) Christopher Li	6	5	[10]
9	(Brazil) João Victor Couto Loureiro	2	7	[7]

==== Fifth qualifier ====
First round
5	(Czech Republic) Matthew William Donald	6	6^{5}	[10]
WC	(United States) Sebastian Gorzny	1	7^{7}	[8]
(Argentina) Ezequiel Monferrer	3	4
11	(Slovenia) Sebastian Dominko	6	6

Qualifying competition
5	(Czech Republic) Matthew William Donald	6	1	[8]
11	(Slovenia) Sebastian Dominko	4	6	[10]

==== Sixth qualifier ====
First round
6	(Czech Republic) Jakub Menšík	6	3	[10]
(Germany) Neo Niedner	1	6	[5]
(United States) Benjamin Kittay	6	2	[10]
8	(Ukraine) German Samofalov	4	6	[7]

Qualifying competition
6	(Czech Republic) Jakub Menšík	6	7^{10}
(United States) Benjamin Kittay	2	6^{8}
