= Jordanne Whiley =

British wheelchair tennis player

Jordanne Whiley MBE
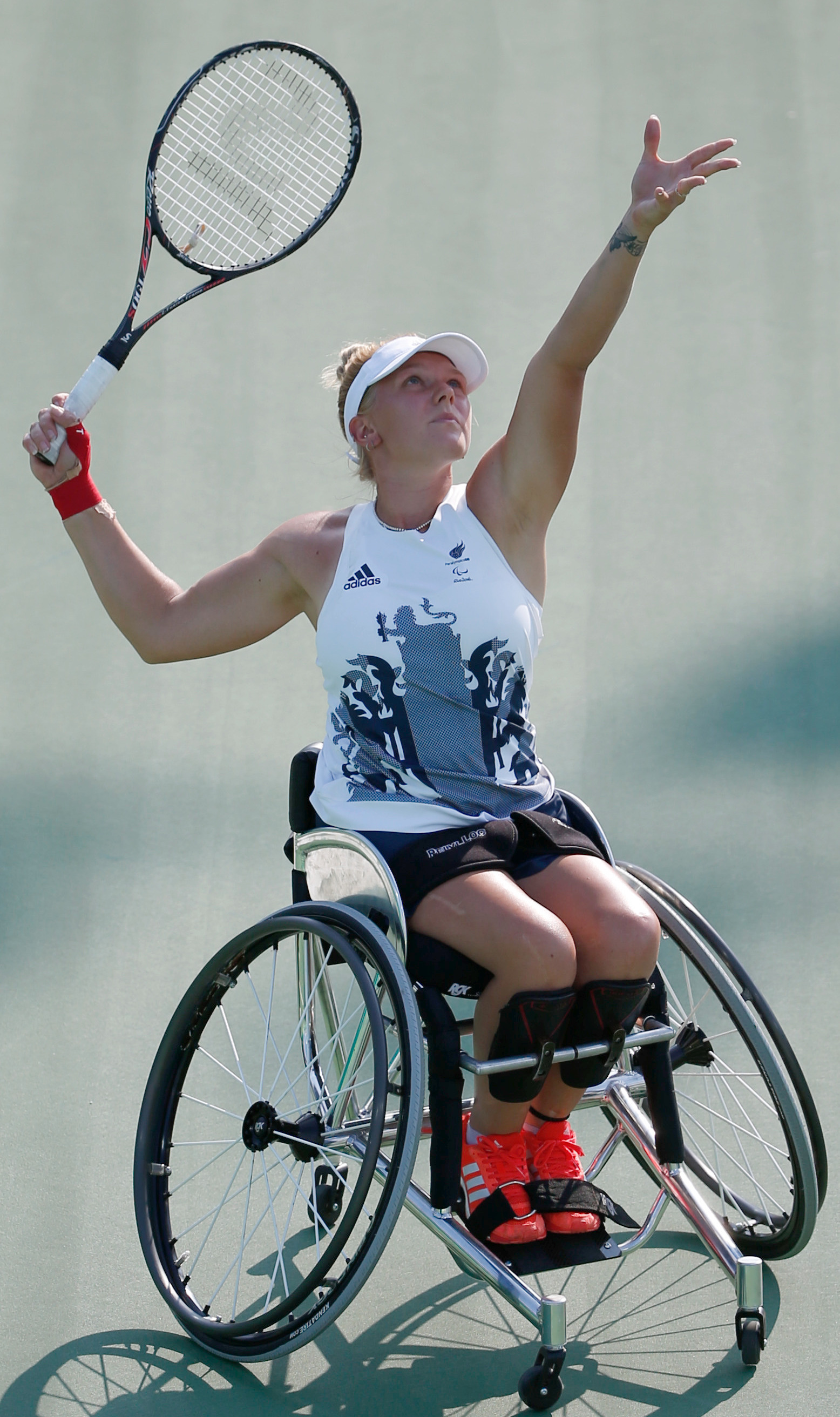
- Whiley at the 2016 Paralympics
- Full name: Jordanne Joyce Whiley
- Country (sports): Great Britain
- Residence: Halesowen, West Midlands
- Born: 11 June 1992 (age 34) Birmingham, England
- Turned pro: c. 2008–2012
- Retired: 2 November 2021

Singles
- Career record: 282–138
- Highest ranking: No. 3 (6 June 2016)

Grand Slam singles results
- Australian Open: SF (2014)
- French Open: SF (2016)
- Wimbledon: SF (2016, 2021)
- US Open: W (2015)

Other tournaments
- Paralympic Games: Bronze medal (2020)

Doubles
- Career record: 223–106
- Highest ranking: No. 1 (20 July 2015)

Grand Slam doubles results
- Australian Open: W (2014, 2015, 2020)
- French Open: W (2014, 2016)
- Wimbledon: W (2014, 2015, 2016, 2017, 2021)
- US Open: W (2014, 2020)

Other doubles tournaments
- Masters Doubles: W (2013, 2014)
- Paralympic Games: Silver Medal (2020); Bronze medals (2012, 2016)

Jordanne Joyce Whiley MBE (born 11 June 1992) is a British retired wheelchair tennis player. Aged 14, she became Britain's youngest national women's singles champion in wheelchair tennis. She has osteogenesis imperfecta as does her father, Keith, who was also a Paralympian and won a bronze medal in 1984 in New York. As well as the 2015 US Open in wheelchair singles, Whiley has won 12 Grand Slam doubles titles, and she and Japanese Yui Kamiji are the fourth team in women's wheelchair doubles (as well as the most recent players) to complete the Calendar Year Grand Slam. Whiley was appointed Member of the Order of the British Empire (MBE) in the 2015 Queens Birthday Honours list for services to wheelchair tennis.

== Career ==
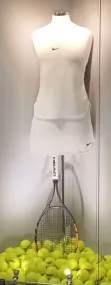
A tennis outfit owned by Jordanne Whiley at the Dudley Archives and Local History

=== Junior ===
In 2006 at the age of 14 Whiley claimed her first senior main draw titles when she won the singles and doubles at the Cardiff Wheelchair Tennis tournament, also winning the girls title. At the end of 2006 Whiley had moved up from 112 to 48 in the rankings and had won junior titles in Poland and the Netherlands. Whiley won two awards at the British Wheelchair Tennis Association awards: Most improved female player and players' player of the year. Whiley created history in 2007 when she defeated Katharine Kruger in Tarbes. She became the first Briton to claim the Cruyff Foundation Wheelchair Juniors Masters title, Whiley also claimed the doubles title with Louise Hunt. Following on from the Masters success Whiley won her second senior title at the North West Challenge. Whiley followed this up by becoming the youngest national British Champion and winning the doubles title as well. Whiley then successfully defended her Cardiff wheelchair tennis tournament titles. In 2008 Whiley successfully defended her Masters titles; defeating Emmy Kaiser in the singles before partnering Hunt to back to back doubles titles. The following week Whiley claimed her first international title the Sion Indoor. Whiley then successfully defended both titles at the North West Challenge. She was named in the team for the 2008 Paralympic Games.

=== Senior ===
In 2012, she reached the finals of Women's wheelchair doubles at Wimbledon. She competed for Great Britain at the 2012 Summer Paralympics where she shared a bronze with Lucy Shuker in women's doubles. Whiley and Shuker won another bronze medal at the 2016 Summer Paralympics, where Whiley was eliminated in the women's singles quarterfinals.

Whiley and her partner Yui Kamiji of Japan achieved a calendar Grand Slam by winning the wheelchair doubles at the Australian Open (beating the Dutch pair Marjolein Buis and Jiske Griffioen), the French Open, Wimbledon and the US Open (overcoming Griffioen and fellow Dutchwoman Aniek van Koot in all three finals). They finished the year by adding the Masters crown after defeating Louise Hunt and Katharina Kruger in the final. However, despite the absence of van Koot and Griffioen the pair did not go undefeated throughout the tournament as they lost to Marjolein Buis and Michaela Spaanstra during the round robin group stage.

Whiley and Kamiji are four times doubles champions at Wimbledon, and Whiley was 11 weeks pregnant when they won their 4th title, in 2017. Whiley did not participate at the Championships in 2018, after giving birth to her son, earlier that year. She planned a comeback in late 2018. In the 2020 season, she won the Australian Open and US Open doubles titles.

In June 2021 she and Lucy Shuker were among six tennis players named to represent the UK at the postponed 2020 Paralympics in Tokyo. Shuker and Whiley won the silver medal in the women's doubles, with Whiley winning bronze in the women's singles.

== Grand Slam performance timelines ==
Key
W	F	SF	QF	#R	RR	Q#	DNQ	A	NH

(W) winner; (F) finalist; (SF) semifinalist; (QF) quarterfinalist; (#R) rounds 4, 3, 2, 1; (RR) round-robin stage; (Q#) qualification round; (DNQ) did not qualify; (A) absent; (NH) not held; (SR) strike rate (events won / competed); (W–L) win–loss record.
To avoid confusion and double counting, these charts are updated at the conclusion of a tournament or when the player's participation has ended.

=== Wheelchair singles ===
Tournament	2011	2012	2013	2014	2015	2016	2017	2018	2019	2020	2021	Career SR	Career Win %
Grand Slam tournaments
Australian Open	QF	A	A	SF	QF	QF	A	A	A	QF	A	0 / 5	0%
French Open	QF	A	A	QF	QF	SF	QF	A	A	QF	QF	0 / 7	0%
Wimbledon	NH	NH	NH	NH	NH	SF	QF	A	QF	NH	SF	0 / 4	0%
US Open	A	NH	QF	QF	W	NH	A	A	A	QF	SF	1 / 5	20%

=== Wheelchair doubles ===
Tournament	2011	2012	2013	2014	2015	2016	2017	2018	2019	2020	2021	Career SR	Career Win %
Grand Slam tournaments
Australian Open	SF	A	A	W	W	SF	A	A	A	W	A	3 / 5	60%
French Open	SF	A	A	W	F	W	SF	A	A	F	F	2 / 7	29%
Wimbledon	SF	F	F	W	W	W	W	A	SF	NH	W	5 / 9	56%
US Open	A	A	SF	W	SF	NH	A	A	A	W	F	2 / 5	40%
