= 2021 US Open – Wheelchair quad doubles =

Wheelchair quad doubles
- 2021 US Open

Final
- Champions: (Netherlands) Sam Schröder (Netherlands) Niels Vink
- Runners-up: (Australia) Dylan Alcott (Australia) Heath Davidson
- Score: 6–3, 6–2

Events
Singles	men	women		boys	girls
Doubles	men	women	mixed	boys	girls
WC Singles	men	women	quad
WC Doubles	men	women	quad
Legends	men	women	mixed
← 2020 ·	US Open	· 2022 →

Sam Schröder and Niels Vink defeated the two-time defending champion Dylan Alcott and his partner Heath Davidson in the final, 6–3, 6–2 to win the quad doubles wheelchair tennis title at the 2021 US Open.

Alcott and Andy Lapthorne were the two-time defending champions, but did not compete together. Lapthorne partnered David Wagner, but was defeated in the semifinals by Schröder and Vink.

== Seeds ==
1. (Australia) Dylan Alcott / (Australia) Heath Davidson (final)
2. (United Kingdom) Andy Lapthorne / (United States) David Wagner (semifinals)

== Draw ==
=== Key ===
- Q = Qualifier
- WC = Wild card
- LL = Lucky loser
- Alt = Alternate
- SE = Special exempt
- PR = Protected ranking
- ITF = ITF entry
- JE = Junior exempt
- w/o = Walkover
- r = Retired
- d = Defaulted
- SR = Special ranking

=== Finals ===
Semifinals
1	(Australia) Dylan Alcott (Australia) Heath Davidson	6	6
(United States) Bryan Barten (Japan) Koji Sugeno	0	4
(Netherlands) Sam Schröder (Netherlands) Niels Vink	7	6
2	(United Kingdom) Andy Lapthorne (United States) David Wagner	5	0

Final
1	(Australia) Dylan Alcott (Australia) Heath Davidson	3	2
(Netherlands) Sam Schröder (Netherlands) Niels Vink	6	6
