= 2021 US Open – Boys' doubles =

Boys' doubles
- 2021 US Open

Final
- Champions: (France) Max Westphal (Hong Kong) Coleman Wong
- Runners-up: (Ukraine) Viacheslav Bielinskyi (Bulgaria) Petr Nesterov
- Score: 6–3, 5–7, [10–1]

Events
Singles	men	women		boys	girls
Doubles	men	women	mixed	boys	girls
WC Singles	men	women	quad
WC Doubles	men	women	quad
Legends	men	women	mixed
- US Open

Eliot Spizzirri and Tyler Zink were the defending champions, having won the previous edition in 2019, however both players were no longer eligible to participate in junior events. Spizzirri and Zink received a wildcard in the men's doubles event, where they lost in the first round.

Max Westphal and Coleman Wong won the title, defeating Viacheslav Bielinskyi and Petr Nesterov in the final, 6–3, 5–7, [10–1].

== Seeds ==
All seeds received a bye into the second round.

1. (Switzerland) Jérôme Kym / (United Kingdom) Jack Pinnington Jones (withdrew)
2. (United States) Samir Banerjee / (United States) Ozan Colak (second round)
3. (France) Sean Cuenin / (France) Sascha Gueymard Wayenburg (quarterfinals)
4. (United States) Alexander Bernard / (United States) Dali Blanch (second round)
5. (Peru) Gonzalo Bueno / (Paraguay) Adolfo Daniel Vallejo (second round)
6. (United States) Victor Lilov / (Slovakia) Peter Benjamín Privara (quarterfinals)
7. (Spain) Daniel Rincón / (Jordan) Abedallah Shelbayh (second round)
8. (Ukraine) Viacheslav Bielinskyi / (Bulgaria) Petr Nesterov (final)

== Draw ==
Key

- Q = Qualifier
- WC = Wild card
- LL = Lucky loser
- Alt = Alternate
- ITF = ITF entry
- PR = Protected ranking
- SR = Special ranking
- SE = Special exempt
- JE = Junior exempt
- JR = Junior Accelerator Programme entrant
- CO = College Accelerator Programme entrant
- NG = Next Gen Accelerator Program entrant
- w/o = Walkover
- r = Retired
- d = Defaulted

=== Finals ===
Semifinals
(France) Max Westphal (Hong Kong) Coleman Wong	6	4	[10]
(United States) Bruno Kuzuhara (Croatia) Mili Poljičak	4	6	[4]
WC	(United States) Nicholas Godsick (United States) Ethan Quinn	6^{2}	3
8	(Ukraine) Viacheslav Bielinskyi (Bulgaria) Petr Nesterov	7^{7}	6

Final
(France) Max Westphal (Hong Kong) Coleman Wong	6	5	[10]
8	(Ukraine) Viacheslav Bielinskyi (Bulgaria) Petr Nesterov	3	7	[1]

=== Top half ===
First round
(France) Max Westphal (Hong Kong) Coleman Wong	3	7^{7}	[10]
(Lithuania) Edas Butvilas (Spain) Alejandro Manzanera Pertusa	6	6^{1}	[4]
(Peru) Ignacio Buse (Ecuador) Álvaro Guillén Meza	6^{5}	3
WC	(United States) Jack Anthrop (United States) Benjamin Kittay	7^{7}	6
(Czech Republic) Jakub Menšík (Australia) Philip Sekulic	6	6^{8}	[5]
(United States) Bruno Kuzuhara (Croatia) Mili Poljičak	4	7^{10}	[10]
(Slovenia) Sebastian Dominko (Peru) Christopher Li	3	6^{4}
(Portugal) Miguel Gomes (United States) Kyle Kang	6	7^{7}

Second round
Alt	(United States) Ryan Colby (United States) Aidan Kim	6	5	[6]
(France) M Westphal (Hong Kong) C Wong	4	7	[10]
WC	(United States) J Anthrop (United States) B Kittay	6	7^{7}
7	(Spain) D Rincón (Jordan) A Shelbayh	4	6^{4}
4	(United States) A Bernard (United States) Dal Blanch	3	4
(United States) B Kuzuhara (Croatia) M Poljičak	6	6
(Portugal) M Gomes (United States) K Kang	6	5	[6]
6	(United States) V Lilov (Slovakia) PB Privara	4	7	[10]

Quarterfinals
(France) M Westphal (Hong Kong) C Wong	4	6	[10]
WC	(United States) J Anthrop (United States) B Kittay	6	3	[7]
(United States) B Kuzuhara (Croatia) M Poljičak	6^{5}	7	[10]
6	(United States) V Lilov (Slovakia) PB Privara	7^{7}	5	[6]

Semifinals
(France) M Westphal (Hong Kong) C Wong	6	4	[10]
(United States) B Kuzuhara (Croatia) M Poljičak	4	6	[4]

=== Bottom half ===
First round
(Germany) Philip Florig (Germany) Max Hans Rehberg	2	6^{5}
WC	(United States) Nicholas Godsick (United States) Ethan Quinn	6	7^{7}
(North Macedonia) Kalin Ivanovski (Estonia) Mark Lajal	3	6	[3]
(Poland) Maks Kaśnikowski (Poland) Aleksander Orlikowski	6	4	[10]
(Sweden) Leo Borg (Czech Republic) Adam Jurajda	6	3	[11]
(Lithuania) Vilius Gaubas (Spain) Daniel Mérida	3	6	[13]
(Czech Republic) Matthew William Donald (China) Shang Juncheng	6	0	[8]
(Sweden) Måns Dahlberg (United Kingdom) Lui Maxted	4	6	[10]

Second round
5	(Peru) G Bueno (Paraguay) AD Vallejo	3	3
WC	(United States) N Godsick (United States) E Quinn	6	6
(Poland) M Kaśnikowski (Poland) A Orlikowski	6	3	[6]
3	(France) S Cuenin (France) S Gueymard Wayenburg	4	6	[10]
8	(Ukraine) V Bielinskyi (Bulgaria) P Nesterov	6	7^{7}
(Lithuania) V Gaubas (Spain) D Mérida	3	6^{4}
(Sweden) M Dahlberg (United Kingdom) L Maxted	3	6	[10]
2	(United States) S Banerjee (United States) O Colak	6	3	[7]

Quarterfinals
WC	(United States) N Godsick (United States) E Quinn	6	7
3	(France) S Cuenin (France) S Gueymard Wayenburg	2	5
8	(Ukraine) V Bielinskyi (Bulgaria) P Nesterov	6	6
(Sweden) M Dahlberg (United Kingdom) L Maxted	3	4

Semifinals
WC	(United States) N Godsick (United States) E Quinn	6^{2}	3
8	(Ukraine) V Bielinskyi (Bulgaria) P Nesterov	7^{7}	6
