= 2021 Wimbledon Championships – Wheelchair men's doubles =

Wheelchair men's doubles
- 2021 Wimbledon Championships

Final
- Champions: (United Kingdom) Alfie Hewett (United Kingdom) Gordon Reid
- Runners-up: (Netherlands) Tom Egberink (Belgium) Joachim Gérard
- Score: 7–5, 6–2

Events
Singles	men	women		boys	girls
Doubles	men	women	mixed	boys	girls
WC Singles	men	women	quad
WC Doubles	men	women	quad
← 2019 ·	Wimbledon Championships	· 2022 →

Alfie Hewett and Gordon Reid defeated the defending champion Joachim Gérard and his partner Tom Egberink in the final, 7–5, 6–2 to win the gentlemen's doubles wheelchair tennis title at the 2021 Wimbledon Championships. It was their fourth Wimbledon title as a team. With the win, they became the first men's wheelchair players to complete a non-calendar-year Grand Slam, and it was their third step towards a Grand Slam.

Gérard and Stefan Olsson were the reigning champions, but Olsson did not qualify for Wimbledon.

== Seeds ==
1. (United Kingdom) Alfie Hewett / (United Kingdom) Gordon Reid (champions)
2. (France) Stéphane Houdet / (France) Nicolas Peifer (semifinals)

== Draw ==
=== Key ===
- Q = Qualifier
- WC = Wild card
- LL = Lucky loser
- Alt = Alternate
- ITF = ITF entry
- PR = Protected ranking
- SR = Special ranking
- SE = Special exempt
- JE = Junior exempt
- JR = Junior Accelerator Programme entrant
- CO = College Accelerator Programme entrant
- NG = Next Gen Accelerator Program entrant
- w/o = Walkover
- r = Retired
- d = Defaulted

=== Finals ===
Semifinals
1	(United Kingdom) Alfie Hewett (United Kingdom) Gordon Reid	6	7
(Argentina) Gustavo Fernández (Japan) Shingo Kunieda	2	5
(Netherlands) Tom Egberink (Belgium) Joachim Gérard	3	6	6
2	(France) Stéphane Houdet (France) Nicolas Peifer	6	4	2

Final
1	(United Kingdom) Alfie Hewett (United Kingdom) Gordon Reid	7	6
(Netherlands) Tom Egberink (Belgium) Joachim Gérard	5	2

== Sources ==
- WC Men's Doubles
