= 2021 Wimbledon Championships – Wheelchair quad singles =

Wheelchair quad singles
- 2021 Wimbledon Championships

Final
- Champion: (Australia) Dylan Alcott
- Runner-up: (Netherlands) Sam Schröder
- Score: 6–2, 6–2

Events
Singles	men	women		boys	girls
Doubles	men	women	mixed	boys	girls
WC Singles	men	women	quad
WC Doubles	men	women	quad
← 2019 ·	Wimbledon Championships	· 2022 →

Defending champion Dylan Alcott defeated Sam Schröder in the final, 6–2, 6–2 to win the quad singles wheelchair tennis title at the 2021 Wimbledon Championships. It was the third step towards an eventual Golden Slam for Alcott, and he completed the double career Grand Slam with the win.

== Seeds ==
1. (Australia) Dylan Alcott (champion)
2. (United Kingdom) Andy Lapthorne (semifinals)

== Draw ==
=== Key ===
- Q = Qualifier
- WC = Wild card
- LL = Lucky loser
- Alt = Alternate
- SE = Special exempt
- PR = Protected ranking
- ITF = ITF entry
- JE = Junior exempt
- w/o = Walkover
- r = Retired
- d = Defaulted
- SR = Special ranking

=== Finals ===
Semifinals
1	(Australia) Dylan Alcott	6	6
WC	(United States) David Wagner	2	2
(Netherlands) Sam Schröder	7	6^{5}	6
2	(United Kingdom) Andy Lapthorne	5	7^{7}	3

Final
1	(Australia) Dylan Alcott	6	6
(Netherlands) Sam Schröder	2	2
Third place play-off
WC	(United States) David Wagner	6	3	4
2	(United Kingdom) Andy Lapthorne	4	6	6

== Sources ==
- WC Quad Singles
