= 2021 US Open – Wheelchair men's singles =

Wheelchair men's singles
- 2021 US Open

Final
- Champion: (Japan) Shingo Kunieda
- Runner-up: (United Kingdom) Alfie Hewett
- Score: 6–1, 6–4

Events
Singles	men	women		boys	girls
Doubles	men	women	mixed	boys	girls
WC Singles	men	women	quad
WC Doubles	men	women	quad
Legends	men	women	mixed
← 2020 ·	US Open	· 2022 →

Defending champion Shingo Kunieda defeated Alfie Hewett in the final, 6–1, 6–4 to win the men's singles wheelchair tennis title at the 2021 US Open. It was his eighth US Open singles title and 25th major singles title overall.

== Seeds ==
1. (Japan) Shingo Kunieda (champion)
2. (United Kingdom) Alfie Hewett (final)

== Draw ==
=== Key ===
- Q = Qualifier
- WC = Wild card
- LL = Lucky loser
- Alt = Alternate
- ITF = ITF entry
- PR = Protected ranking
- SR = Special ranking
- SE = Special exempt
- JE = Junior exempt
- JR = Junior Accelerator Programme entrant
- CO = College Accelerator Programme entrant
- NG = Next Gen Accelerator Program entrant
- w/o = Walkover
- r = Retired
- d = Defaulted

=== Finals ===
Quarterfinals
1	(Japan) Shingo Kunieda	6	6
WC	(United States) Casey Ratzlaff	1	0
(Netherlands) Tom Egberink	1	4
(United Kingdom) Gordon Reid	6	6
(France) Stéphane Houdet	4	3
(Argentina) Gustavo Fernández	6	6
(France) Nicolas Peifer	5	2
2	(United Kingdom) Alfie Hewett	7	6

Semifinals
1	(Japan) Shingo Kunieda	4	6	6
(United Kingdom) Gordon Reid	6	4	2
(Argentina) Gustavo Fernández	2	4
2	(United Kingdom) Alfie Hewett	6	6

Final
1	(Japan) Shingo Kunieda	6	6
2	(United Kingdom) Alfie Hewett	1	4
