= 2021 US Open – Wheelchair women's doubles =

Wheelchair women's doubles
- 2021 US Open

Final
- Champions: (Netherlands) Diede de Groot (Netherlands) Aniek van Koot
- Runners-up: (Japan) Yui Kamiji (United Kingdom) Jordanne Whiley
- Score: 6–1, 6–2

Events
Singles	men	women		boys	girls
Doubles	men	women	mixed	boys	girls
WC Singles	men	women	quad
WC Doubles	men	women	quad
Legends	men	women	mixed
← 2020 ·	US Open	· 2022 →

Diede de Groot and Aniek van Koot defeated the defending champions Yui Kamiji and Jordanne Whiley in the final, 6–1, 6–2 to win the women's doubles wheelchair tennis title at the 2021 US Open.

== Seeds ==
1. (Netherlands) Diede de Groot / (Netherlands) Aniek van Koot (champions)
2. (Japan) Yui Kamiji / (United Kingdom) Jordanne Whiley (final)

== Draw ==
=== Key ===
- Q = Qualifier
- WC = Wild card
- LL = Lucky loser
- Alt = Alternate
- ITF = ITF entry
- PR = Protected ranking
- SR = Special ranking
- SE = Special exempt
- JE = Junior exempt
- JR = Junior Accelerator Programme entrant
- CO = College Accelerator Programme entrant
- NG = Next Gen Accelerator Program entrant
- w/o = Walkover
- r = Retired
- d = Defaulted

=== Finals ===
Semifinals
1	(Netherlands) Diede de Groot (Netherlands) Aniek van Koot	6	6
(United States) Dana Mathewson (South Africa) Kgothatso Montjane	0	2
(Colombia) Angélica Bernal (Japan) Momoko Ohtani	2	0
2	(Japan) Yui Kamiji (United Kingdom) Jordanne Whiley	6	6

Final
1	(Netherlands) Diede de Groot (Netherlands) Aniek van Koot	6	6
2	(Japan) Yui Kamiji (United Kingdom) Jordanne Whiley	1	2
