= Laura Hietaranta =

Finnish tennis player (born 2004)

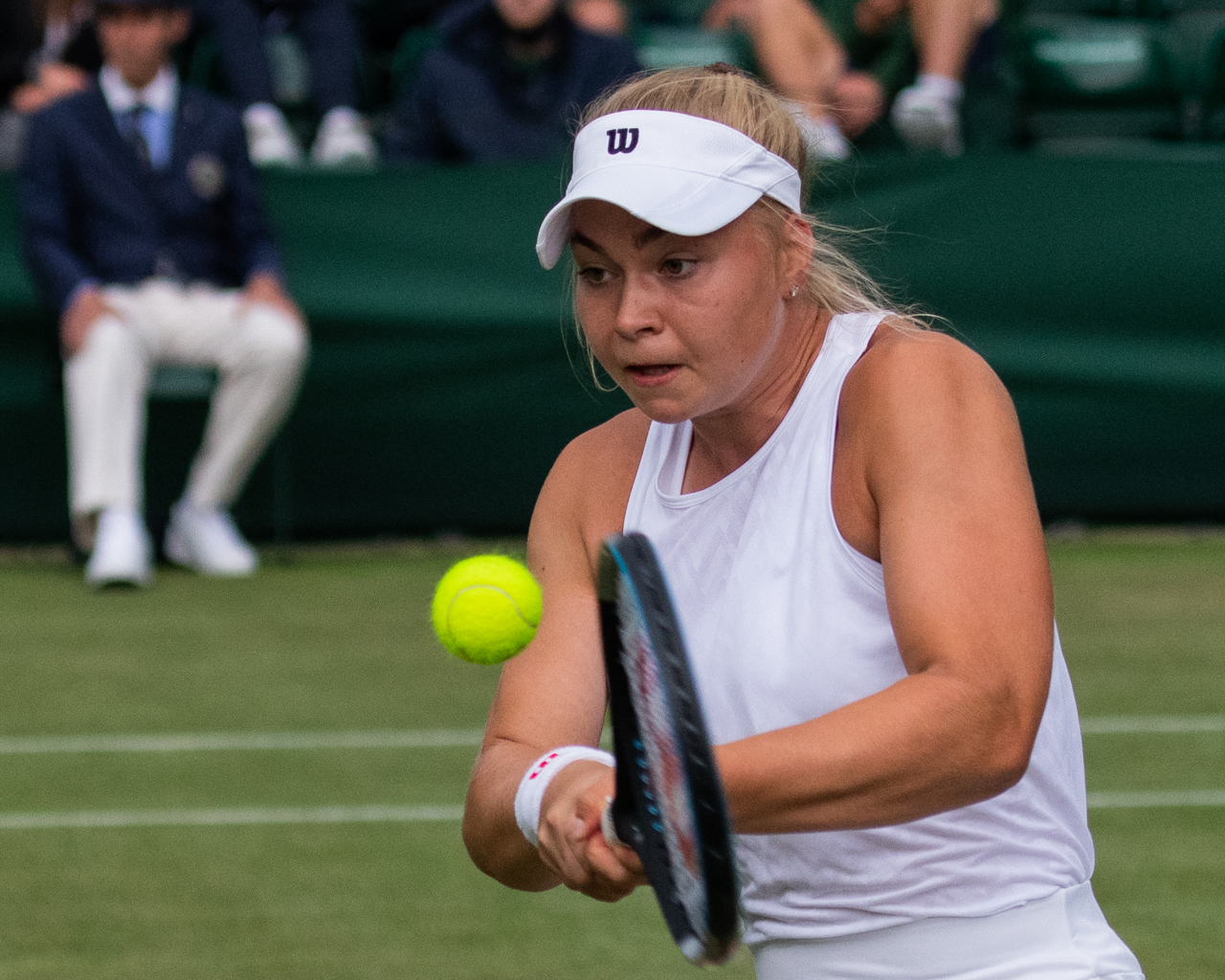
- Country (sports): Finland
- Born: 2 February 2004 (age 22)
- Plays: Right (two-handed backhand)
- Prize money: $102,150

Singles
- Career record: 179–111
- Career titles: 7 ITF
- Highest ranking: No. 307 (9 February 2026)
- Current ranking: No. 486 (26 October 2026)

Doubles
- Career record: 107–67
- Career titles: 13 ITF
- Highest ranking: No. 221 (19 October 2026)
- Current ranking: No. 234 (26 October 2026)

Team competitions
- Fed Cup: 24–7
- Last updated on: 29 October 2026.

Laura Hietaranta (born 2 February 2004) is a Finnish tennis player. She has achieved career-high WTA rankings of 307 in singles and 221 in doubles.

Hietaranta has represented Finland in the Billie Jean King Cup, making her debut in 2020. Her win-loss record is 24–7, as of October 2026.

== Juniors ==
On the ITF Junior Circuit, Hietaranta reached a career-high junior ranking of 32, achieved on 1 March 2021.

Grand Slam performance - Singles:

- Australian Open: 1R (2022)
- French Open: –
- Wimbledon: 1R (2021)
- US Open: 1R (2021)

Grand Slam performance - Doubles:

- Australian Open: 1R (2022)
- French Open: –
- Wimbledon: F (2021)
- US Open: 1R (2021)

== ITF Circuit finals ==
=== Singles: 10 (7 titles, 3 runner-ups) ===
Legend
W35 tournaments
W15 tournaments

Result	W-L	Date	Tournament	Tier	Surface	Opponent	Score
Win	1–0	Aug 2022	ITF Norrköping, Sweden	W15	Clay	(Italy) Enola Chiesa	6–0, 6–0
Loss	1–1	Sep 2022	ITF Casablanca, Morocco	W15	Clay	Alina Korneeva	5–7, 4–6
Win	2–1	Sep 2022	ITF Casablanca, Morocco	W15	Clay	(Switzerland) Marie Mettraux	6–2, 6–2
Loss	2–2	Jul 2023	ITF Vejle, Denmark	W15	Hard	(Denmark) Rebecca Munk Mortensen	3–6, 6–3, 0–6
Win	3–2	Apr 2024	ITF Antalya, Turkey	W15	Clay	(Bulgaria) Rositsa Dencheva	6–1, 6–1
Win	4–2	Mar 2025	ITF Heraklion, Greece	W15	Clay	Ekaterina Makarova	6–4, 6–4
Win	5–2	Apr 2025	ITF Santa Margherita di Pula, Italy	W35	Clay	(France) Sarah Iliev	6–1, 6–1
Win	6–2	May 2025	ITF Kuršumlijska Banja, Serbia	W15	Clay	Diana Demidova	6–4, 6–1
Win	7–2	Aug 2025	ITF Hämeenlinna, Finland	W15	Clay	(Finland) Ella Haavisto	6–1, 6–0
Loss	7–3	Aug 2026	ITF Hämeenlinna, Finland	W15	Clay	(Czech Republic) Amelie Justine Hejtmanek	4–6, 6–2, 4–6

=== Doubles: 20 (13 titles, 7 runner-ups) ===
Legend
W75 tournaments
W40/50 tournaments
W25/35 tournaments
W15 tournaments

Result	W-L	Date	Tournament	Tier	Surface	Partner	Opponents	Score
Loss	0–1	Feb 2022	ITF Sharm El Sheikh, Egypt	W15	Hard	(Greece) Michaela Laki	(Chinese Taipei) Lee Pei-chi (Chinese Taipei) Lee Ya-hsin	2–6, 6–3, [7–10]
Win	1–1	Jul 2022	ITF Casablanca, Morocco	W15	Clay	Anastasiia Gureva	(Switzerland) Marie Mettraux (Italy) Federica Prati	6–2, 6–2
Win	2–1	Aug 2022	ITF Norrköping, Sweden	W15	Clay	(France) Laïa Petretic	(Poland) Weronika Baszak (Norway) Astrid Brune Olsen	6–4, 6–3
Win	3–1	Sep 2022	ITF Casablanca, Morocco	W15	Clay	(Netherlands) Stéphanie Visscher	(Croatia) Mariana Dražić; Aleksandra Pospelova	1–6, 7–5, [10–8]
Win	4–1	Jul 2023	ITF Savitaipale, Finland	W15	Clay	(Hungary) Luca Udvardy	(Poland) Weronika Baszak (Estonia) Anet Angelika Koskel	6–1, 6–2
Loss	4–2	Aug 2023	Vrnjačka Banja Open, Serbia	W25	Clay	(Italy) Diletta Cherubini	(Serbia) Elena Milovanović (Australia) Ivana Popovic	4–6, 1–6
Win	5–2	Jan 2024	ITF Sunderland, UK	W35	Hard (i)	(United Kingdom) Ella McDonald	(France) Julie Belgraver (Slovakia) Katarína Strešnaková	6–4, 6–1
Win	6–2	Feb 2024	ITF Helsinki, Finland	W35	Hard (i)	(Czech Republic) Linda Klimovičová	(Greece) Valentini Grammatikopoulou (Poland) Martyna Kubka	6–3, 6–1
Loss	6–3	May 2024	ITF Santa Margherita di Pula, Italy	W35	Clay	(Greece) Sapfo Sakellaridi	(Netherlands) Eva Vedder (Venezuela) Andrea Gámiz	6–2, 2–6, [4–10]
Win	7–3	May 2024	ITF Annenheim, Austria	W35	Clay	(Estonia) Elena Malõgina	(Slovenia) Nika Radišić (Latvia) Daniela Vismane	3–6, 6–3, [10–6]
Win	8–3	Jul 2024	ITF Buzău, Romania	W35	Clay	(Slovakia) Nina Vargová	(Romania) Briana Szabó (Romania) Patricia Maria Țig	6–3, 6–4
Win	9–3	Oct 2024	ITF Santa Margherita di Pula	W35	Clay	(Greece) Sapfo Sakellaridi	(Italy) Alessandra Mazzola (Italy) Federica Urgesi	6–3, 6–4
Win	10–3	Mar 2025	ITF Helsinki, Finland	W35	Hard	(United Kingdom) Ella McDonald	(Turkey) Ayla Aksu (Poland) Martyna Kubka	6–3, 6–4
Win	11–3	Apr 2025	ITF Santa Margherita di Pula	W35	Clay	(United Kingdom) Ella McDonald	(Italy) Anastasia Bertacchi (Italy) Viola Turini	6–2, 6–3
Loss	11–4	Apr 2026	ITF Santa Margherita di Pula	W35	Clay	(France) Tiphanie Lemaître	(Italy) Enola Chiesa (Germany) Joëlle Steur	1–6, 3–6
Win	12–4	May 2026	Empire Slovak Open, Slovakia	W75	Clay	(Slovakia) Nina Vargová	(Spain) María Martínez Vaquero (Spain) Alba Rey García	6–2, 6–3
Loss	12–5	Jul 2026	ITS Cup, Czech Republic	W75	Clay	(Slovakia) Nina Vargová	(Hungary) Adrienn Nagy (Czech Republic) Ivana Šebestová	6–3, 6–7^{(6)}, [5–10]
Loss	12–6	Jul 2026	Internazionali di Cordenons, Italy	W75	Clay	(Latvia) Beatrise Zeltiņa	(Italy) Gaia Maduzzi (Italy) Vittoria Paganetti	6–2, 4–6, [5–10]
Win	13–6	Aug 2026	ITF Saint-Palais-sur-Mer, France	W50	Clay	(Netherlands) Sarah van Emst	(Ukraine) Valeriya Strakhova (Netherlands) Demi Tran	6–2, 6–4
Loss	13–7	Sep 2026	ITF Baza, Spain	W35	Hard	(Slovakia) Radka Zelníčková	(Serbia) Elena Milovanović (Slovenia) Kristina Novak	1–6, 0–6

== Junior Grand Slam tournament final ==
=== Doubles: 1 (runner-up) ===
Result	Year	Tournament	Surface	Partner	Opponents	Score
Loss	2021	Wimbledon	Grass	(Belgium) Sofia Costoulas	(Belarus) Kristina Dmitruk (Russia) Diana Shnaider	1–6, 2–6
