= Mara Guth =

German tennis player

- Country (sports): Germany
- Born: 24 June 2003 (age 23)
- Plays: Right-handed (two-handed backhand)
- Prize money: US $77,332

Singles
- Career record: 160–124
- Career titles: 4 ITF
- Highest ranking: No. 451 (19 June 2023)
- Current ranking: No. 564 (16 November 2026)

Doubles
- Career record: 38–34
- Career titles: 3 ITF
- Highest ranking: No. 472 (11 December 2023)
- Current ranking: No. 1448 (16 November 2026)
- Last updated on: 17 November 2026.

Mara Guth (born 24 June 2003) is a German professional tennis player. She has a career-high WTA singles ranking of world No. 451, achieved in June 2023, and a best doubles ranking of No. 472, reached in December 2023.

== Career ==
She made her WTA Tour main draw debut at the 2021 Bad Homburg Open where she was handed a wildcard. She was defeated in the first round by Nadia Podoroska. She also made her main-draw debut in doubles at the same event, partnering Julia Middendorf, but the pair lost in the first round.

== ITF Circuit finals ==
=== Singles: 8 (4 titles, 4 runner-ups) ===
Legend W25 tournaments (0–1) W15 tournaments (4–3)	Finals by surface Hard (3–2) Clay (1–2)

Result	W–L	Date	Tournament	Tier	Surface	Opponents	Score
Loss	0–1	Aug 2022	ITF Leipzig, Germany	W25	Clay	(Slovenia) Nina Potočnik	6–4, 2–6, 5–7
Loss	0–2	Apr 2023	ITF Monastir, Tunisia	W15	Hard	(Serbia) Elena Milovanović	6–7^{(5–7)}, 3–6
Win	1–2	Sep 2023	ITF Kursumlijska Banja, Serbia	W15	Clay	(Italy) Enola Chiesa	6–4, 2–0 ret.
Loss	1–3	Sep 2023	ITF Kursumlijska Banja, Serbia	W15	Clay	Elena Pridankina	6–7^{(4–7)}, ret.
Win	2–3	Mar 2024	ITF Monastir, Tunisia	W15	Hard	(Germany) Carolina Kuhl	6–2, 3–3 ret.
Win	3–3	Nov 2025	ITF Monastir, Tunisia	W15	Hard	(Latvia) Beatrise Zeltiņa	6–3, 4–6, 7–6^{(7–2)}
Win	4–3	Apr 2026	ITF Monastir, Tunisia	W15	Hard	Yuliya Hatouka	6–3, 6–1
Loss	4–4	Nov 2026	ITF Monastir, Tunisia	W15	Hard	Maria Andrienko	2–6, 1–6

=== Doubles: 5 (3 titles, 2 runner-ups) ===
Legend W25 tournaments (1–0) W15 tournaments (2–2)	Finals by surface Hard (2–1) Clay (1–1)

Result	W–L	Date	Tournament	Tier	Surface	Partner	Opponents	Score
Loss	0–1	Feb 2022	ITF Monastir, Tunisia	W15	Hard	(Germany) Mia Mack	(United States) Clervie Ngounoue (Belgium) Hanne Vandewinkel	1–6, 2–6
Win	1–1	Sep 2023	ITF Kursumlijska Banja, Serbia	W15	Clay	(Slovakia) Salma Drugdová	(Ukraine) Oleksandra Korashvili (Republic of Ireland) Celine Simunyu	5–2 ret.
Loss	1–2	Sep 2023	ITF Kursumlijska Banja, Serbia	W15	Clay	Elena Pridankina	(Greece) Eleni Christofi (Serbia) Katarina Jokić	2–6, 3–6
Win	2–2	Nov 2023	ITF Lousada, Portugal	W25	Hard (i)	Elena Pridankina	(Germany) Alicia Melosch (Germany) Johanna Silva	6–1, 6–1
Win	3–2	Mar 2024	ITF Monastir, Tunisia	W15	Hard	(Greece) Sapfo Sakellaridi	(Germany) Luisa Hrda (Germany) Yasmine Wagner	7–5, 6–1

== ITF Junior Circuit finals ==
Category G1
Category G2
Category G3
Category G4
Category G5

=== Singles (3–2) ===
Result	W–L	Date	Tournament	Grade	Surface	Opponent	Score
Loss	0–1	Jul 2018	Bruchköbel, Germany	G4	Clay	(Germany) Julia Middendorf	6–2, 1–6, 3–4 ret.
Win	1–1	Jul 2018	Mönchengladbach, Germany	G4	Clay	(Germany) Julia Middendorf	7–6^{(7–4)}, 6–1
Win	2–1	Jul 2019	Castricum, the Netherlands	G2	Clay	(Spain) Jéssica Bouzas Maneiro	6–3, 4–6, 6–0
Loss	2–2	Aug 2019	Rutesheim, Germany	G3	Clay	(Russia) Erika Andreeva	0–6, 6–3, 6–7^{(4–7)}
Win	3–2	May 2021	Oberpullendorf, Austria	G2	Clay	(Germany) Nicole Rivkin	7–6^{(9–7)}, 6–1

=== Doubles (6–1) ===
Result	W–L	Date	Tournament	Grade	Surface	Partner	Opponents	Score
Win	1–0	Feb 2018	Cadolzburg, Germany	G4	Carpet	(Germany) Julia Middendorf	(Austria) Elisabeth Koelbel (Austria) Emily Meyer	6–2, 6–4
Win	2–0	Jul 2018	Mönchengladbach, Germany	G4	Clay	(Germany) Julia Middendorf	(Romania) Ilinca Amariei (Romania) Oana Smaranda Corneanu	6–1, 4–6, [10–6]
Loss	2–1	Jun 2019	Plzeň, Czech Republic	G2	Clay	(Austria) Sinja Kraus	(Czech Republic) Barbora Palicová (United States) Hibah Shaikh	0–6, 2–6
Win	3–1	Aug 2019	Rutesheim, Germany	G3	Clay	(Germany) Eva Lys	(Germany) Amelie-Christin Janßen (Germany) Angelina Wirges	7–5, 6–7^{(3–7)}, [10–8]
Win	4–1	Sep 2019	Győr, Hungary	G2	Clay	(Germany) Julia Middendorf	(Slovenia) Živa Falkner (Slovenia) Pia Lovrič	6–3, 6–2
Win	5–1	Mar 2021	Benicarló, Spain	G2	Clay	(Germany) Julia Middendorf	(Switzerland) Alina Granwehr (Germany) Laura Isabel Putz	6–4, 4–6, [10–4]
Win	6–1	Jul 2021	Klosters, Switzerland	GB1	Clay	(Germany) Julia Middendorf	(Czech Republic) Linda Nosková (Russia) Diana Shnaider	6–3, 3–6, [10–7]
