= Michaela Laki =

Greek tennis player

Michaela Laki Μιχαέλα Λάκη
- Country (sports): Greece
- Born: 24 March 2005 (age 20) Larissa, Greece
- Prize money: US$44,755

Singles
- Career record: 117–76
- Career titles: 4 ITF
- Highest ranking: No. 466 (13 November 2023)
- Current ranking: No. 546 (14 October 2024)

Doubles
- Career record: 35–28
- Career titles: 3 ITF
- Highest ranking: No. 625 (17 February 2025)
- Current ranking: No. 859 (14 October 2024)

Team competitions
- Fed Cup: 1–2
- Last updated on: 14 October 2024.

Michaela Laki (Greek:Μιχαέλα Λάκη; born 24 March 2005) is a Greek professional tennis player.

Laki has won four singles and three doubles titles on the ITF Circuit. She reached her career-high singles ranking of world No. 466 on 13 November 2023.

Playing for Greece Fed Cup team, Laki has a win–loss record of 1–2.

== Junior career ==
Junior Grand Slam results – Singles:

- Australian Open: QF (2022)
- French Open: 3R (2021)
- Wimbledon: 1R (2021, 2022)
- US Open: 3R (2021)

Junior Grand Slam results – Doubles:

- Australian Open: 2R (2022)
- French Open: 2R (2021)
- Wimbledon: 1R (2021)
- US Open: 2R (2021)

== ITF Circuit finals ==
=== Singles: 7 (4 titles, 3 runner-ups) ===
Legend
$15,000 tournaments (4–3)

Result	W–L	Date	Tournament	Tier	Surface	Opponent	Score
Win	1–0	Nov 2021	ITF Heraklion, Greece	15,000	Clay	(Israel) Nicole Khirin	5–7, 6–1, 7–5
Loss	1–1	May 2022	ITF Heraklion, Greece	15,000	Clay	(Belgium) Tilwith Di Girolami	1–6, 4–6
Loss	1–2	Nov 2022	ITF Heraklion, Greece	15,000	Clay	(Croatia) Lucija Ćirić Bagarić	3–6, 6–4, 4–6
Loss	1–3	Apr 2023	ITF Antalya, Turkey	15,000	Clay	(Belgium) Vicky Van de Peer	3–6, 6–3, 6–2
Win	2–3	May 2023	ITF Kursumlijska Banja, Serbia	15,000	Clay	(Netherlands) Anouk Koevermans	6–1, 6–4
Win	3–3	June 2023	ITF Kursumlijska Banja, Serbia	15,000	Clay	(Serbia) Andjela Lazarević	6–3, 6–2
Win	4–3	Nov 2023	ITF Heraklion, Greece	15,000	Clay	(Romania) Lavinia Tânâsie	6–2, 2–6, 7–6^{(5)}

=== Doubles: 6 (3 titles, 3 runner-ups) ===
Legend
W25/35 tournaments (0–1)
W15 tournaments (3–2)

Result	W–L	Date	Tournament	Tier	Surface	Partner	Opponents	Score
Loss	0–1	Feb 2022	ITF Sharm El Sheikh, Egypt	W15	Hard	(Finland) Laura Hietaranta	(Chinese Taipei) Lee Pei-chi (Chinese Taipei) Lee Ya-hsin	2–6, 6–3, [7–10]
Win	1–1	Mar 2022	ITF Monastir, Tunisia	W15	Hard	(Greece) Eleni Christofi	(Japan) Haruna Arakawa (Japan) Natsuho Arakawa	7–5, 6–3
Win	2–1	May 2022	ITF Heraklion, Greece	W15	Clay	(Greece) Dimitra Pavlou	(Czech Republic) Ivana Šebestová (Germany) Franziska Sziedat	6–4, 7–6^{(3)}
Win	3–1	May 2022	ITF Heraklion, Greece	W15	Clay	(Serbia) Lola Radivojević	(Australia) Gabriella Da Silva-Fick (Netherlands) Stéphanie Visscher	6–1, 4–6, [10–8]
Loss	3–2	Jul 2022	ITF Monastir, Tunisia	W15	Hard	Anastasiia Gureva	(Indonesia) Priska Madelyn Nugroho (China) Wei Sijia	2–6, 6–4, [5–10]
Loss	3–3	Oct 2024	ITF Heraklion, Greece	W35	Clay	(Brazil) Luiza Fullana	(Belgium) Marie Benoît; Ekaterina Makarova	7–6^{(4)}, 6–1

== ITF Junior finals ==
=== Singles: 7 (6 titles, 1 runner-up) ===
Legend
Category GA
Category G1
Category G2
Category G3
Category G4
Category G5

Result	W–L	Date	Location	Tier	Surface	Opponent	Score
Win	1–0	Sep 2018	ITF Mytilene, Greece	Grade 5	Hard	(Greece) Maria Kallistrou	6–1, 6–0
Win	2–0	Oct 2018	ITF Rhodes, Greece	Grade 5	Hard	(Greece) Maria Kallistrou	6–2, 6–1
Loss	2–1	Mar 2019	ITF Limassol, Cyprus	Grade 3	Hard	(Belarus) Jana Kolodynska	7–5, 6–3
Win	3–1	Jul 2019	ITF Ioannina, Greece	Grade 4	Clay	(Bulgaria) Daria Shalamanova	6–4, 6–2
Win	4–1	Nov 2019	ITF Nicosia, Cyprus	Grade 3	Clay	(Slovakia) Yvonna Zuffova	2–6, 6–3, 7–5
Win	5–1	Feb 2021	ITF Manacor, Spain	Grade 3	Hard	(Argentina) Lucia Peyre	6–1, 6–2
Win	6–1	Apr 2021	ITF Plovdiv, Bulgaria	Grade 1	Clay	(Belgium) Sofia Costoulas	6–2, 3–6, 6–2

=== Doubles: 5 (4 titles, 1 runner-ups) ===
Result	W–L	Date	Location	Tier	Surface	Partner	Opponents	Score
Win	1–0	Sep 2018	ITF Mytilene, Greece	Grade 5	Hard	(Greece) Athina Pitta	(Russia) Sofia Saitova (Russia) Diana Yanotovskaya	6–3, 7–5
Win	2–0	Oct 2018	ITF Rhodes, Greece	Grade 5	Hard	(Greece) Athina Pitta	(Bulgaria) Ralitsa Alexandrova (Greece) Maria Kallistrou	6–3, 6–7^{(4–7)}, 10–8
Win	3–0	Oct 2020	ITF Lousada, Portugal	Grade 3	Clay	(Russia) Nadezda Khalturina	(Spain) Ariana Geerlings (Italy) Anna Paradisi	6–4, 6–1
Win	4–0	Feb 2021	ITF Porto Alegre, Brazil	Grade 1	Clay	(Serbia) Lola Radivojević	(United States) Elizabeth Coleman (United States) Madison Sieg	6–4, 6–4
Loss	4–1	Jul 2021	ITF Roehampton, UK	Grade 1	Grass	(Serbia) Lola Radivojević	(United States) Reese Brantmeier (United States) Ashlyn Krueger	4–6, 2–6
