= 2020 European Open – Singles =

Singles
- 2020 European Open

Final
- Champion: (France) Ugo Humbert
- Runner-up: (Australia) Alex de Minaur
- Score: 6–1, 7–6^{(7–4)}

Details
- Draw: 28 (4 Q / 3 WC )
- Seeds: 8

Events
Singles	Doubles
- European Open

Andy Murray was the defending champion, but this year he decided to participate in the Cologne event instead, where he later withdrew due to hip injury.

Ugo Humbert won the title, defeating Alex de Minaur in the final, 6–1, 7–6^{(7–4)}. He saved four match points against Dan Evans in semifinals.

== Seeds ==
The top four seeds receive a bye into the second round.

1. (Belgium) David Goffin (second round)
2. (Spain) Pablo Carreño Busta (second round)
3. (Russia) Karen Khachanov (quarterfinals)
4. (Bulgaria) Grigor Dimitrov (semifinals)
5. (Canada) Milos Raonic (quarterfinals, withdrew)
6. (Serbia) Dušan Lajović (first round)
7. (United States) Taylor Fritz (second round)
8. (Australia) Alex de Minaur (final)

== Draw ==
Key

- Q = Qualifier
- WC = Wild card
- LL = Lucky loser
- Alt = Alternate
- ITF = ITF entry
- PR = Protected ranking
- SR = Special ranking
- SE = Special exempt
- JE = Junior exempt
- JR = Junior Accelerator Programme entrant
- CO = College Accelerator Programme entrant
- NG = Next Gen Accelerator Program entrant
- w/o = Walkover
- r = Retired
- d = Defaulted

=== Finals ===
Semifinals
8	(Australia) Alex de Minaur	7^{7}	6^{3}	6
4	(Bulgaria) Grigor Dimitrov	6^{4}	7^{7}	4
(United Kingdom) Dan Evans	6	6^{7}	4
(France) Ugo Humbert	4	7^{9}	6

Final
8	(Australia) Alex de Minaur	1	6^{4}
(France) Ugo Humbert	6	7^{7}

=== Top half ===
First round
Q	(United States) M Giron	4	6	6
WC	(Italy) L Nardi	6	4	1
(United States) T Paul	3	2
(Spain) F López	6	6
(France) R Gasquet	6	6^{5}	3
8	(Australia) A de Minaur	3	7^{7}	6
LL	(Argentina) F Coria	2	3
(Spain) P Andújar	6	6
Q	(Finland) E Ruusuvuori	3	6^{4}
(United Kingdom) C Norrie	6	7^{7}
(Slovenia) A Bedene	3	6^{4}
5	(Canada) M Raonic	6	7^{7}

Second round
1	(Belgium) D Goffin	3	5
Q	(United States) M Giron	6	7
(Spain) F López	4	2
8	(Australia) A de Minaur	6	6
4	(Bulgaria) G Dimitrov	4	6	6
(Spain) P Andújar	6	3	4
(United Kingdom) C Norrie	5	6^{4}
5	(Canada) M Raonic	7	7^{7}

Quarterfinals
Q	(United States) M Giron	3	0
8	(Australia) A de Minaur	6	6
4	(Bulgaria) G Dimitrov	w/o
5	(Canada) M Raonic

Semifinals
8	(Australia) A de Minaur	7^{7}	6^{3}	6
4	(Bulgaria) G Dimitrov	6^{4}	7^{7}	4

=== Bottom half ===
First round
6	(Serbia) D Lajović	3	6^{6}
(United States) F Tiafoe	6	7^{8}
Q	(Italy) S Caruso	2	6	3
(United Kingdom) D Evans	6	3	6
WC	(Belgium) Z Bergs	7	7
(Spain) A Ramos Viñolas	5	5
7	(United States) T Fritz	7^{7}	6
(United States) R Opelka	6^{5}	1
(France) C Moutet	5	2
Q	(South Africa) L Harris	7	6
WC	(Belgium) K Coppejans	4	3
(France) U Humbert	6	6

Second round
(United States) F Tiafoe	6^{3}	2
(United Kingdom) D Evans	7^{7}	6
WC	(Belgium) Z Bergs	7	4	4
3	(Russia) K Khachanov	5	6	6
7	(United States) T Fritz	5	6^{3}
Q	(South Africa) L Harris	7	7^{7}
(France) U Humbert	5	6	6
2	(Spain) P Carreño Busta	7	3	4

Quarterfinals
(United Kingdom) D Evans	3	7^{9}	6
3	(Russia) K Khachanov	6	6^{7}	4
Q	(South Africa) L Harris	2	6^{2}
(France) U Humbert	6	7^{7}

Semifinals
(United Kingdom) D Evans	6	6^{7}	4
(France) U Humbert	4	7^{9}	6

== Qualifying ==
=== Seeds ===
1. (Italy) Salvatore Caruso (qualified)
2. (Portugal) João Sousa (qualifying competition, retired)
3. (Argentina) Federico Coria (qualifying competition, lucky loser)
4. (United States) Marcos Giron (qualified)
5. (South Africa) Lloyd Harris (qualified)
6. (Japan) Yasutaka Uchiyama (qualifying competition)
7. (Finland) Emil Ruusuvuori (qualified)
8. (Japan) Yūichi Sugita (qualifying competition)

=== Qualifiers ===
1. (Italy) Salvatore Caruso
2. (Finland) Emil Ruusuvuori
3. (South Africa) Lloyd Harris
4. (United States) Marcos Giron

=== Lucky loser ===
1. (Argentina) Federico Coria

=== Qualifying draw ===
==== First qualifier ====
First round
1	(Italy) Salvatore Caruso	7^{7}	6
Alt	(Belgium) Michael Geerts	6^{5}	4
WC	(Romania) Nicholas David Ionel	6	1	2
8	(Japan) Yūichi Sugita	4	6	6

Qualifying competition
1	(Italy) Salvatore Caruso	6	6
8	(Japan) Yūichi Sugita	3	4

==== Second qualifier ====
First round
2	(Portugal) João Sousa	6	2	6
(Italy) Andreas Seppi	4	6	4
(Colombia) Daniel Elahi Galán	4	2
7	(Finland) Emil Ruusuvuori	6	6

Qualifying competition
2	(Portugal) João Sousa	1^{r}
7	(Finland) Emil Ruusuvuori	1

==== Third qualifier ====
First round
3	(Argentina) Federico Coria	7	6
(Spain) Carlos Taberner	5	3
WC	(United States) Zane Khan	6^{1}	2
5	(South Africa) Lloyd Harris	7^{7}	6

Qualifying competition
3	(Argentina) Federico Coria	4	0
5	(South Africa) Lloyd Harris	6	6

==== Fourth qualifier ====
First round
4	(United States) Marcos Giron	6	4	6
(Poland) Kamil Majchrzak	3	6	3
Alt	(United Kingdom) Liam Broady	4	6	1
6	(Japan) Yasutaka Uchiyama	6	3	6

Qualifying competition
4	(United States) Marcos Giron	7^{7}	6
6	(Japan) Yasutaka Uchiyama	6^{1}	2
