= 2020 European Open – Doubles =

Doubles
- 2020 European Open

Final
- Champions: (Australia) John Peers (New Zealand) Michael Venus
- Runners-up: (India) Rohan Bopanna (Netherlands) Matwé Middelkoop
- Score: 6–3, 6–4

Events
| Singles | Doubles |
| ← 2019 · | European Open | · 2021 → |

Kevin Krawietz and Andreas Mies were the defending champions but this year they decided to participate in the Cologne event instead.

John Peers and Michael Venus won the title, defeating Rohan Bopanna and Matwé Middelkoop in the final, 6–3, 6–4.

== Seeds ==
1. (Colombia) Juan Sebastián Cabal / (Colombia) Robert Farah (withdrew)
2. (Australia) John Peers / (New Zealand) Michael Venus (champions)
3. (France) Fabrice Martin / (Netherlands) Jean-Julien Rojer (first round)
4. (United Kingdom) Jamie Murray / (United Kingdom) Neal Skupski (first round)
5. (Belgium) Sander Gillé / (Belgium) Joran Vliegen (semifinals)

== Draw ==
=== Key ===
- Q = Qualifier
- WC = Wild card
- LL = Lucky loser
- Alt = Alternate
- SE = Special exempt
- PR = Protected ranking
- ITF = ITF entry
- JE = Junior exempt
- w/o = Walkover
- r = Retired
- d = Defaulted
- SR = Special ranking

First round
5 | (Belgium) S Gillé (Belgium) J Vliegen | 6 | 6
(El Salvador) M Arévalo (United Kingdom) J O'Mara | 4 | 3
(United States) T Fritz (United States) N Monroe | 6 | 3 | [10]
(United Kingdom) D Evans (United Kingdom) C Norrie | 4 | 6 | [12]
4 | (United Kingdom) J Murray (United Kingdom) N Skupski | 4 | 4
(India) R Bopanna (Netherlands) M Middelkoop | 6 | 6
(Serbia) N Ćaćić (Brazil) M Demoliner | 6 | 3 | [9]
Alt | (Australia) A de Minaur (Australia) M Reid | 4 | 6 | [11]
WC | (United States) Z Khan (Italy) L Nardi | 4 | 6^{3}
WC | (Belgium) M Geerts (Belgium) Y Mertens | 6 | 7^{7}
Alt | (Spain) P Andújar (Netherlands) S Arends | 6^{6} | 6 | [10]
3 | (France) F Martin (Netherlands) J-J Rojer | 7^{8} | 2 | [5]
(Denmark) F Nielsen (Germany) T Pütz | 5 | 2
(Italy) S Bolelli (Argentina) M González | 7 | 6
(United Kingdom) L Bambridge (United States) J Withrow | 4 | 5
2 | (Australia) J Peers (New Zealand) M Venus | 6 | 7

Quarterfinals
5 | (Belgium) S Gillé (Belgium) J Vliegen | 7 | 6
(United Kingdom) D Evans (United Kingdom) C Norrie | 5 | 3
(India) R Bopanna (Netherlands) M Middelkoop | 6 | 4 | [10]
Alt | (Australia) A de Minaur (Australia) M Reid | 3 | 6 | [4]
WC | (Belgium) M Geerts (Belgium) Y Mertens | 4 | 1
Alt | (Spain) P Andújar (Netherlands) S Arends | 6 | 6
(Italy) S Bolelli (Argentina) M González | 3 | 4
2 | (Australia) J Peers (New Zealand) M Venus | 6 | 6

Semifinals
5 | (Belgium) S Gillé (Belgium) J Vliegen | 6 | 3 | [8]
(India) R Bopanna (Netherlands) M Middelkoop | 4 | 6 | [10]
Alt | (Spain) P Andújar (Netherlands) S Arends | 3 | 4
2 | (Australia) J Peers (New Zealand) M Venus | 6 | 6

Final
(India) R Bopanna (Netherlands) M Middelkoop | 3 | 4
2 | (Australia) J Peers (New Zealand) M Venus | 6 | 6
