= 2019 ITF Men's World Tennis Tour (October–December) =

The 2019 ITF Men's World Tennis Tour is the 2019 edition of the second-tier tour for men's professional tennis. It is organised by the International Tennis Federation and is a tier below the ATP Tour. The ITF Men's World Tennis Tour includes tournaments with prize money ranging from $15,000 to $25,000.

== Key ==
M25 tournaments
M15 tournaments

== Month ==
=== October ===
Week of	Tournament	Winner	Runners-up	Semifinalists	Quarterfinalists
October 7	Toowoomba, Australia; Hard; M25; Singles and Doubles Draws	(Australia) Dayne Kelly; 1–6, 6–3, 6–0	(Australia) Jacob Grills	(France) Alexis Musialek (Australia) Maverick Banes	(Australia) Luke Saville (Canada) Martin Beran (Thailand) Wishaya Trongcharoenchaikul (Australia) Harry Bourchier
October 7	Toowoomba, Australia; Hard; M25; Singles and Doubles Draws	(United Kingdom) Brydan Klein (Australia) Scott Puodziunas; 6–3, 6–4	(Chinese Taipei) Hsu Yu-hsiou (Ukraine) Vladyslav Orlov	(France) Alexis Musialek (Australia) Maverick Banes	(Australia) Luke Saville (Canada) Martin Beran (Thailand) Wishaya Trongcharoenchaikul (Australia) Harry Bourchier
October 7	Rio de Janeiro, Brazil; Clay; M25; Singles and Doubles Draws	(Argentina) Sebastián Báez; 4–6, 6–4, 4–1, ret.	(Argentina) Tomás Martín Etcheverry	(Sweden) Christian Lindell (Brazil) Felipe Meligeni Alves	(Brazil) Fabiano de Paula (Chile) Bastián Malla (Peru) Arklon Huertas del Pino (Argentina) Camilo Ugo Carabelli
October 7	Rio de Janeiro, Brazil; Clay; M25; Singles and Doubles Draws	(Brazil) Gilbert Klier Júnior (Brazil) Felipe Meligeni Alves; 1–6, 6–4, [10–6]	(Brazil) Igor Marcondes (Brazil) Rafael Matos	(Sweden) Christian Lindell (Brazil) Felipe Meligeni Alves	(Brazil) Fabiano de Paula (Chile) Bastián Malla (Peru) Arklon Huertas del Pino (Argentina) Camilo Ugo Carabelli
October 7	Pula, Italy; Hard; M25; Singles and Doubles Draws	(Italy) Giulio Zeppieri; 6–3, 6–2	(Brazil) Bruno Sant'Anna	(Germany) Peter Torebko (Bosnia and Herzegovina) Nerman Fatić	(Italy) Alessandro Ingarao (Italy) Enrico Dalla Valle (Italy) Julian Ocleppo (Italy) Federico Iannaccone
October 7	Pula, Italy; Hard; M25; Singles and Doubles Draws	(Italy) Giovanni Fonio (Italy) Julian Ocleppo; 6–3, 6–3	(Bolivia) Boris Arias (Italy) Erik Crepaldi	(Germany) Peter Torebko (Bosnia and Herzegovina) Nerman Fatić	(Italy) Alessandro Ingarao (Italy) Enrico Dalla Valle (Italy) Julian Ocleppo (Italy) Federico Iannaccone
October 7	Lagos, Nigeria; Hard; M25+H; Singles and Doubles Draws	(France) Calvin Hemery; 6–1, 6–2	(Bosnia and Herzegovina) Aldin Šetkić	(Zimbabwe) Takanyi Garanganga (Austria) David Pichler	(Tunisia) Skander Mansouri (Zimbabwe) Mehluli Don Ayanda Sibanda (India) Aryan Goveas (Tunisia) Aziz Dougaz
October 7	Lagos, Nigeria; Hard; M25+H; Singles and Doubles Draws	(Tunisia) Aziz Dougaz (Tunisia) Skander Mansouri; 7–6^{(7–4)}, 6–3	(Zimbabwe) Benjamin Lock (Zimbabwe) Courtney John Lock	(Zimbabwe) Takanyi Garanganga (Austria) David Pichler	(Tunisia) Skander Mansouri (Zimbabwe) Mehluli Don Ayanda Sibanda (India) Aryan Goveas (Tunisia) Aziz Dougaz
October 7	Riba-roja de Túria, Spain; Clay; M25; Singles and Doubles Draws	(Spain) Carlos Gimeno Valero; 6–4, 6–2	(Switzerland) Johan Nikles	(Spain) Oriol Roca Batalla (Argentina) Manuel Peña López	(Spain) Eduard Esteve Lobato (Spain) Ricardo Ojeda Lara (Spain) Carlos Boluda-Purkiss (Spain) Javier Barranco Cosano
October 7	Riba-roja de Túria, Spain; Clay; M25; Singles and Doubles Draws	(Spain) Íñigo Cervantes (Spain) Oriol Roca Batalla; 6–2, 6–1	(Argentina) Nicolás Alberto Arreche (Argentina) Franco Feitt	(Spain) Oriol Roca Batalla (Argentina) Manuel Peña López	(Spain) Eduard Esteve Lobato (Spain) Ricardo Ojeda Lara (Spain) Carlos Boluda-Purkiss (Spain) Javier Barranco Cosano
October 7	Claremont, United States; Hard; M25; Singles and Doubles Draws	(Belgium) Michael Geerts; 6–3, 6–2	(United Kingdom) Liam Broady	(United States) Evan Song (United States) Raymond Sarmiento	(Germany) Jakob Schnaitter (Canada) Benjamin Sigouin (United States) Zane Khan (United States) Tanner Smith
October 7	Claremont, United States; Hard; M25; Singles and Doubles Draws	(Germany) Milen Ianakiev (Germany) Hendrik Jebens; 6–4, 3–6, [17–15]	(Philippines) Ruben Gonzales (South Africa) Ruan Roelofse	(United States) Evan Song (United States) Raymond Sarmiento	(Germany) Jakob Schnaitter (Canada) Benjamin Sigouin (United States) Zane Khan (United States) Tanner Smith
October 7	Tây Ninh, Vietnam; Hard; M25; Singles and Doubles Draws	(United States) Daniel Nguyen; 6–4, 6–2	(Japan) Rio Noguchi	(China) Bai Yan (United Kingdom) Billy Harris	(Japan) Naoki Nakagawa (India) Manish Sureshkumar (Japan) Daisuke Sumizawa (Japan) Shuichi Sekiguchi
October 7	Tây Ninh, Vietnam; Hard; M25; Singles and Doubles Draws	(Japan) Rio Noguchi (Russia) Alexey Zakharov; 6–7^{(5–7)}, 6–4, [10–4]	(United States) Samuel Beren (United Kingdom) Billy Harris	(China) Bai Yan (United Kingdom) Billy Harris	(Japan) Naoki Nakagawa (India) Manish Sureshkumar (Japan) Daisuke Sumizawa (Japan) Shuichi Sekiguchi
October 7	Burgas, Bulgaria; Clay; M15; Singles and Doubles Draws	(Italy) Fabrizio Ornago; 6–2, 0–0, ret.	(Hungary) Péter Nagy	(Serbia) Marko Tepavac (Bulgaria) Alexandar Lazarov	(Bulgaria) Simon Anthony Ivanov (Bulgaria) Alexander Donski (Romania) Călin Manda (Germany) Kai Wehnelt
October 7	Burgas, Bulgaria; Clay; M15; Singles and Doubles Draws	(Germany) Luca Gelhardt (Germany) Kai Wehnelt; 6–3, 6–3	(Bulgaria) Petr Nesterov (Bulgaria) Simeon Terziev	(Serbia) Marko Tepavac (Bulgaria) Alexandar Lazarov	(Bulgaria) Simon Anthony Ivanov (Bulgaria) Alexander Donski (Romania) Călin Manda (Germany) Kai Wehnelt
October 7	Sharm El Sheikh, Egypt; Hard; M15; Singles and Doubles Draws	(Czech Republic) Marek Gengel; 6–2, 6–3	(Morocco) Adam Moundir	(Venezuela) Jordi Muñoz Abreu (Italy) Giorgio Ricca	(Serbia) Darko Jandrić (Poland) Michał Dembek (Tunisia) Anis Ghorbel (Japan) Naoki Tajima
October 7	Sharm El Sheikh, Egypt; Hard; M15; Singles and Doubles Draws	(Czech Republic) Marek Gengel (Tunisia) Anis Ghorbel; 7–6^{(7–4)}, 6–3	(Morocco) Adam Moundir (Italy) Giorgio Ricca	(Venezuela) Jordi Muñoz Abreu (Italy) Giorgio Ricca	(Serbia) Darko Jandrić (Poland) Michał Dembek (Tunisia) Anis Ghorbel (Japan) Naoki Tajima
October 7	Bad Salzdetfurth, Germany; Carpet (indoor); M15; Singles and Doubles Draws	(United Kingdom) Jan Choinski; 6–3, 6–1	(Germany) Stefan Seifert	(Netherlands) Justin Eleveld (Czech Republic) Michal Konečný	(Switzerland) Marc-Andrea Hüsler (France) Maxime Tchoutakian (Netherlands) Daniel de Jonge (Germany) Robert Strombachs
October 7	Bad Salzdetfurth, Germany; Carpet (indoor); M15; Singles and Doubles Draws	(Germany) Lasse Muscheites (Germany) Stefan Seifert; 2–6, 6–3, [11–9]	(Germany) Daniel Altmaier (United Kingdom) Jan Choinski	(Netherlands) Justin Eleveld (Czech Republic) Michal Konečný	(Switzerland) Marc-Andrea Hüsler (France) Maxime Tchoutakian (Netherlands) Daniel de Jonge (Germany) Robert Strombachs
October 7	Cancún, Mexico; Hard; M15; Singles and Doubles Draws	(United States) Alec Adamson; 4–6, 6–3, 6–2	(Peru) Jorge Panta	(Republic of Ireland) Julian Bradley (United States) Alexander Knight	(Argentina) Maximiliano Estévez (Mexico) Gerardo López Villaseñor (United States) Adam El Mihdawy (Argentina) Mariano Kestelboim
October 7	Cancún, Mexico; Hard; M15; Singles and Doubles Draws	(United States) Alec Adamson (United States) Luke Jacob Gamble; 6–2, 6–1	(Argentina) Maximiliano Estévez (Argentina) Mariano Kestelboim	(Republic of Ireland) Julian Bradley (United States) Alexander Knight	(Argentina) Maximiliano Estévez (Mexico) Gerardo López Villaseñor (United States) Adam El Mihdawy (Argentina) Mariano Kestelboim
October 7	Tabarka, Tunisia; Clay; M15; Singles and Doubles Draws	(Argentina) Ignacio Monzón; 6–3, 6–1	(United States) Nicolas Moreno de Alboran	(Argentina) Fermín Tenti (Italy) Simone Roncalli	(Argentina) Mariano Navone (Italy) Gabriele Maria Noce (Italy) Alexander Weis (Argentina) Juan Ignacio Galarza
October 7	Tabarka, Tunisia; Clay; M15; Singles and Doubles Draws	(Argentina) Ignacio Monzón (Argentina) Fermín Tenti; Default	(Serbia) Boris Butulija (United States) Nicolas Moreno de Alboran	(Argentina) Fermín Tenti (Italy) Simone Roncalli	(Argentina) Mariano Navone (Italy) Gabriele Maria Noce (Italy) Alexander Weis (Argentina) Juan Ignacio Galarza
October 7	Antalya, Turkey; Clay; M15; Singles and Doubles Draws	(Hungary) Máté Valkusz; 6–2, 7–5	(Hungary) Fábián Marozsán	(Croatia) Matija Pecotić (Georgia (country)) Aleksandre Bakshi	(Germany) Peter Heller (Czech Republic) Michael Vrbenský (Georgia (country)) Aleksandre Metreveli (Russia) Denis Klok
October 7	Antalya, Turkey; Clay; M15; Singles and Doubles Draws	(Sweden) Gustav Hansson (Sweden) Jonathan Mridha; 6–3, 6–4	(Russia) Alexander Ovcharov (Russia) Alexander Shevchenko	(Croatia) Matija Pecotić (Georgia (country)) Aleksandre Bakshi	(Germany) Peter Heller (Czech Republic) Michael Vrbenský (Georgia (country)) Aleksandre Metreveli (Russia) Denis Klok
October 7	Qarshi, Uzbekistan; Hard; M15; Singles and Doubles Draws	(Uzbekistan) Khumoyun Sultanov; 6–2, 6–1	(Kazakhstan) Beibit Zhukayev	(Russia) Alibek Kachmazov (Russia) Alexander Igoshin	(Uzbekistan) Sanjar Fayziev (Russia) Alexandr Binda (Kazakhstan) Timur Maulenov (Kazakhstan) Timur Khabibulin
October 7	Qarshi, Uzbekistan; Hard; M15; Singles and Doubles Draws	(Uzbekistan) Sanjar Fayziev (Kazakhstan) Timur Khabibulin; 7–6^{(7–2)}, 6–4	(Russia) Anton Chekhov (Uzbekistan) Khumoyun Sultanov	(Russia) Alibek Kachmazov (Russia) Alexander Igoshin	(Uzbekistan) Sanjar Fayziev (Russia) Alexandr Binda (Kazakhstan) Timur Maulenov (Kazakhstan) Timur Khabibulin
October 14	Rodez, France; Hard (indoor); M25+H; Singles and Doubles Draws	(France) Hugo Gaston; 7–6^{(7–4)}, 6–3	(France) Benjamin Bonzi	(Belgium) Yannick Mertens (Belgium) Christopher Heyman	(France) Mathias Bourgue (France) Thomas Laurent (France) Arthur Reymond (France) Dan Added
October 14	Rodez, France; Hard (indoor); M25+H; Singles and Doubles Draws	(France) Dan Added (France) Albano Olivetti; 7–5, 6–7^{(1–7)}, [10–4]	(France) Benjamin Bonzi (France) Grégoire Jacq	(Belgium) Yannick Mertens (Belgium) Christopher Heyman	(France) Mathias Bourgue (France) Thomas Laurent (France) Arthur Reymond (France) Dan Added
October 14	Lagos, Nigeria; Hard; M25+H; Singles and Doubles Draws	(France) Calvin Hemery; 4–2, ret.	(Bosnia and Herzegovina) Aldin Šetkić	(Zimbabwe) Takanyi Garanganga (Tunisia) Aziz Ouakaa	(France) Gianni Mina (Austria) David Pichler (Tunisia) Aziz Dougaz (Zimbabwe) Benjamin Lock
October 14	Lagos, Nigeria; Hard; M25+H; Singles and Doubles Draws	(Zimbabwe) Benjamin Lock (Zimbabwe) Courtney John Lock; 6–4, 6–4	(United States) William Bushamuka (India) Aryan Goveas	(Zimbabwe) Takanyi Garanganga (Tunisia) Aziz Ouakaa	(France) Gianni Mina (Austria) David Pichler (Tunisia) Aziz Dougaz (Zimbabwe) Benjamin Lock
October 14	Waco, United States; Hard; M25; Singles and Doubles Draws	(Belgium) Michael Geerts; 7–5, 3–6, 7–6^{(7–4)}	(United States) Alex Rybakov	(Chile) Matías Soto (United States) Jordi Arconada	(United Kingdom) Aidan McHugh (United States) Nick Chappell (Israel) Ben Patael (Lebanon) Hady Habib
October 14	Waco, United States; Hard; M25; Singles and Doubles Draws	(Netherlands) Jesper de Jong (Netherlands) Ryan Nijboer; 7–6^{(7–4)}, 6–1	(Belgium) Michael Geerts (United Kingdom) Mark Whitehouse	(Chile) Matías Soto (United States) Jordi Arconada	(United Kingdom) Aidan McHugh (United States) Nick Chappell (Israel) Ben Patael (Lebanon) Hady Habib
October 14	São Paulo, Brazil; Clay; M15; Singles and Doubles Draws	(Chile) Bastián Malla; 6–3, 6–2	(Brazil) Rafael Matos	(Argentina) Matías Zukas (Brazil) Igor Marcondes	(Argentina) Juan Manuel Cerúndolo (Peru) Arklon Huertas del Pino (Argentina) Sebastián Báez (Brazil) Gilbert Klier Júnior
October 14	São Paulo, Brazil; Clay; M15; Singles and Doubles Draws	(Brazil) Igor Marcondes (Brazil) José Pereira; 7–6^{(7–5)}, 4–6, [11–9]	(Chile) Bastián Malla (Chile) Michel Vernier	(Argentina) Matías Zukas (Brazil) Igor Marcondes	(Argentina) Juan Manuel Cerúndolo (Peru) Arklon Huertas del Pino (Argentina) Sebastián Báez (Brazil) Gilbert Klier Júnior
October 14	Olomouc, Czech Republic; Carpet (indoor); M15; Singles and Doubles Draws	(Czech Republic) Robin Staněk; 6–3, 6–4	(Czech Republic) Jaroslav Pospíšil	(Germany) Elmar Ejupovic (Netherlands) Niels Lootsma	(Czech Republic) Vít Kopřiva (Czech Republic) Petr Michnev (Czech Republic) Petr Nouza (Hungary) Zsombor Piros
October 14	Olomouc, Czech Republic; Carpet (indoor); M15; Singles and Doubles Draws	(Czech Republic) Petr Michnev (Czech Republic) Robert Rumler; 4–6, 6–4, [10–6]	(Czech Republic) Michal Konečný (Czech Republic) Ondřej Krstev	(Germany) Elmar Ejupovic (Netherlands) Niels Lootsma	(Czech Republic) Vít Kopřiva (Czech Republic) Petr Michnev (Czech Republic) Petr Nouza (Hungary) Zsombor Piros
October 14	Sharm El Sheikh, Egypt; Hard; M15; Singles and Doubles Draws	(Egypt) Karim-Mohamed Maamoun; 6–4, 4–6, 6–4	(Czech Republic) Marek Gengel	(Italy) Francesco Vilardo (Spain) Pablo Vivero González	(Ukraine) Illya Beloborodko (Russia) Boris Pokotilov (Switzerland) Riccardo Maiga (Japan) Naoki Tajima
October 14	Sharm El Sheikh, Egypt; Hard; M15; Singles and Doubles Draws	(Italy) Alessandro Bega (Italy) Jacopo Berrettini; 7–6^{(7–5)}, 6–2	(France) Arthur Bernabé (Russia) Boris Pokotilov	(Italy) Francesco Vilardo (Spain) Pablo Vivero González	(Ukraine) Illya Beloborodko (Russia) Boris Pokotilov (Switzerland) Riccardo Maiga (Japan) Naoki Tajima
October 14	Cancún, Mexico; Hard; M15; Singles and Doubles Draws	(Mexico) Tigre Hank; 6–4, 6–7^{(4–7)}, 6–3	(Colombia) Cristian Rodríguez	(Peru) Jorge Panta (Argentina) Mariano Kestelboim	(Colombia) Sergio Luis Hernández Ramírez (Mexico) Gerardo López Villaseñor (United States) Isaiah Strode (Bolivia) Federico Zeballos
October 14	Cancún, Mexico; Hard; M15; Singles and Doubles Draws	(Bolivia) Alejandro Mendoza (Bolivia) Federico Zeballos; 3–6, 6–3, [10–6]	(Colombia) José Daniel Bendeck (Colombia) Cristian Rodríguez	(Peru) Jorge Panta (Argentina) Mariano Kestelboim	(Colombia) Sergio Luis Hernández Ramírez (Mexico) Gerardo López Villaseñor (United States) Isaiah Strode (Bolivia) Federico Zeballos
October 14	Doha, Qatar; Hard; M15; Singles and Doubles Draws	(Germany) Tobias Simon; 6–3, 7–5	(Russia) Bogdan Bobrov	(Ukraine) Marat Deviatiarov (Venezuela) Ricardo Rodríguez	(Slovenia) Tom Kočevar-Dešman (Switzerland) Antoine Bellier (Germany) Adrian Obert (Netherlands) Mick Veldheer
October 14	Doha, Qatar; Hard; M15; Singles and Doubles Draws	(Switzerland) Antoine Bellier (France) Quentin Folliot; 6–4, 2–6, [10–6]	(Morocco) Adam Moundir (Slovakia) Marek Semjan	(Ukraine) Marat Deviatiarov (Venezuela) Ricardo Rodríguez	(Slovenia) Tom Kočevar-Dešman (Switzerland) Antoine Bellier (Germany) Adrian Obert (Netherlands) Mick Veldheer
October 14	Changwon, South Korea; Hard; M15; Singles and Doubles Draws	(South Korea) Shin San-hui; 7–5, 6–2	(United States) Dusty Boyer	(Japan) Yuta Shimizu (Japan) Naoki Nakagawa	(South Korea) Na Jung-woong (South Korea) Chung Hong (Japan) Ryohei Tagata (Japan) Shintaro Mochizuki
October 14	Changwon, South Korea; Hard; M15; Singles and Doubles Draws	(Japan) Shintaro Mochizuki (Japan) Naoki Nakagawa; 6–4, 6–4	(South Korea) Chung Hong (South Korea) Lee Jea-moon	(Japan) Yuta Shimizu (Japan) Naoki Nakagawa	(South Korea) Na Jung-woong (South Korea) Chung Hong (Japan) Ryohei Tagata (Japan) Shintaro Mochizuki
October 14	Getafe, Spain; Hard; M15; Singles and Doubles Draws	(United Kingdom) Anton Matusevich; 7–5, 6–4	(Spain) Nicolás Álvarez Varona	(Monaco) Lucas Catarina (Spain) Alejandro García	(Russia) Alexander Zhurbin (Spain) David Jordà Sanchis (Brazil) Jordan Correia (Spain) Carlos Boluda-Purkiss
October 14	Getafe, Spain; Hard; M15; Singles and Doubles Draws	(Spain) Carlos Boluda-Purkiss (France) Mick Lescure; 4–6, 7–5, [10–8]	(Spain) Alberto Barroso Campos (Spain) Bruno Mardones	(Monaco) Lucas Catarina (Spain) Alejandro García	(Russia) Alexander Zhurbin (Spain) David Jordà Sanchis (Brazil) Jordan Correia (Spain) Carlos Boluda-Purkiss
October 14	Tabarka, Tunisia; Clay; M15; Singles and Doubles Draws	(Croatia) Duje Ajduković; 6–3, 6–1	(Spain) Pol Toledo Bagué	(Argentina) Nicolás Alberto Arreche (Argentina) Manuel Peña López	(Argentina) Fermín Tenti (Argentina) Octavio Volpi (Italy) Lorenzo Bocchi (Belgium) Benjamin D'Hoe
October 14	Tabarka, Tunisia; Clay; M15; Singles and Doubles Draws	(Argentina) Nicolás Alberto Arreche (Argentina) Manuel Peña López; 4–6, 6–3, [10–7]	(Morocco) Anas Fattar (Algeria) Youcef Rihane	(Argentina) Nicolás Alberto Arreche (Argentina) Manuel Peña López	(Argentina) Fermín Tenti (Argentina) Octavio Volpi (Italy) Lorenzo Bocchi (Belgium) Benjamin D'Hoe
October 14	Antalya, Turkey; Clay; M15; Singles and Doubles Draws	(Italy) Lorenzo Musetti; 7–5, 6–2	(Hungary) Fábián Marozsán	(Hungary) Máté Valkusz (Hungary) Péter Fajta	(Czech Republic) Tomáš Jiroušek (Austria) Lukas Krainer (Romania) Ștefan Paloși (Germany) Milan Welte
October 14	Antalya, Turkey; Clay; M15; Singles and Doubles Draws	(Hungary) Fábián Marozsán (Hungary) Máté Valkusz; 7–5, 6–2	(Russia) Vladimir Korolev (Russia) Ronald Slobodchikov	(Hungary) Máté Valkusz (Hungary) Péter Fajta	(Czech Republic) Tomáš Jiroušek (Austria) Lukas Krainer (Romania) Ștefan Paloși (Germany) Milan Welte
October 14	Bukhara, Uzbekistan; Hard; M15; Singles and Doubles Draws	(Russia) Shalva Dzhanashiya; 6–3, 7–6^{(7–1)}	(Russia) Maxim Ratniuk	(Belarus) Ivan Liutarevich (Russia) Egor Noskin	(Belarus) Aliaksandr Liaonenka (Kazakhstan) Beibit Zhukayev (Russia) Sergey Shipilov (Uzbekistan) Ibrokhimjon Urinov
October 14	Bukhara, Uzbekistan; Hard; M15; Singles and Doubles Draws	(Russia) Mikhail Fufygin (Russia) Maxim Ratniuk; 7–6^{(7–5)}, 7–6^{(7–2)}	(Uzbekistan) Sanjar Fayziev (Kazakhstan) Timur Khabibulin	(Belarus) Ivan Liutarevich (Russia) Egor Noskin	(Belarus) Aliaksandr Liaonenka (Kazakhstan) Beibit Zhukayev (Russia) Sergey Shipilov (Uzbekistan) Ibrokhimjon Urinov
October 21	Monastir, Tunisia; Hard; M25; Singles and Doubles Draws	(Cyprus) Petros Chrysochos; 6–4, 3–6, 6–3	(France) Alexis Gautier	(Spain) Roberto Ortega Olmedo (Tunisia) Majed Kilani	(Sweden) Filip Bergevi (France) Quentin Robert (Sweden) Markus Eriksson (France) Matteo Martineau
October 21	Monastir, Tunisia; Hard; M25; Singles and Doubles Draws	(Cyprus) Petros Chrysochos (Tunisia) Skander Mansouri; 7–5, 6–2	(France) Gabriel Petit (France) Hugo Pontico	(Spain) Roberto Ortega Olmedo (Tunisia) Majed Kilani	(Sweden) Filip Bergevi (France) Quentin Robert (Sweden) Markus Eriksson (France) Matteo Martineau
October 21	Fayetteville, United States; Hard; M25; Singles and Doubles Draws	(Dominican Republic) Roberto Cid Subervi; 6–2, 6–2	(United States) Aleksandar Kovacevic	(Colombia) Nicolás Mejía (United States) Michael Redlicki	(Japan) Haru Inoue (Czech Republic) Matěj Vocel (Czech Republic) Dominik Kellovský (United States) Jacob Dunbar
October 21	Fayetteville, United States; Hard; M25; Singles and Doubles Draws	(Dominican Republic) Roberto Cid Subervi (United States) Evan Song; 7–6^{(7–2)}, 6–3	(United States) Justin Butsch (United States) Korey Lovett	(Colombia) Nicolás Mejía (United States) Michael Redlicki	(Japan) Haru Inoue (Czech Republic) Matěj Vocel (Czech Republic) Dominik Kellovský (United States) Jacob Dunbar
October 21	Fort Worth, United States; Hard; M25; Singles and Doubles Draws	(Netherlands) Jesper de Jong; 6–2, 6–0	(United Kingdom) Ryan Peniston	(United Kingdom) Liam Broady (United States) Alfredo Perez	(Czech Republic) Tadeáš Paroulek (United Kingdom) Jacob Fearnley (Germany) Hendrik Jebens (United States) Nathan Ponwith
October 21	Fort Worth, United States; Hard; M25; Singles and Doubles Draws	(United States) Hunter Johnson (United States) Yates Johnson; 6–2, 6–4	(United States) Charlie Emhardt (United States) Alfredo Perez	(United Kingdom) Liam Broady (United States) Alfredo Perez	(Czech Republic) Tadeáš Paroulek (United Kingdom) Jacob Fearnley (Germany) Hendrik Jebens (United States) Nathan Ponwith
October 21	Junín, Argentina; Clay; M15; Singles and Doubles Draws	(Argentina) Hernán Casanova; 6–2, 6–1	(Argentina) Juan Manuel Cerúndolo	(Argentina) Juan Ignacio Galarza (Argentina) Franco Emanuel Egea	(Argentina) Guido Iván Justo (Argentina) Alejo Vilaro (Argentina) Gabriel Alejandro Hidalgo (Argentina) Genaro Alberto Olivieri
October 21	Junín, Argentina; Clay; M15; Singles and Doubles Draws	(Argentina) Santiago Besada (Argentina) Francisco Comesaña; 6–2, 6–4	(Argentina) Nicolás Bianchi (Argentina) Juan Bautista Torres	(Argentina) Juan Ignacio Galarza (Argentina) Franco Emanuel Egea	(Argentina) Guido Iván Justo (Argentina) Alejo Vilaro (Argentina) Gabriel Alejandro Hidalgo (Argentina) Genaro Alberto Olivieri
October 21	Liberec, Czech Republic; Carpet (indoor); M15; Singles and Doubles Draws	(Czech Republic) Andrew Paulson; 7–6^{(7–3)}, 6–1	(Czech Republic) Petr Michnev	(Sweden) Christian Samuelsson (Poland) Michał Dembek	(Switzerland) Adrian Bodmer (Czech Republic) Václav Šafránek (Czech Republic) Michal Konečný (Belarus) Uladzimir Ignatik
October 21	Liberec, Czech Republic; Carpet (indoor); M15; Singles and Doubles Draws	(Czech Republic) Petr Michnev (Czech Republic) Petr Nouza; 7–6^{(7–4)}, 7–5	(Czech Republic) Michal Konečný (Czech Republic) Ondřej Krstev	(Sweden) Christian Samuelsson (Poland) Michał Dembek	(Switzerland) Adrian Bodmer (Czech Republic) Václav Šafránek (Czech Republic) Michal Konečný (Belarus) Uladzimir Ignatik
October 21	Sharm El Sheikh, Egypt; Hard; M15; Singles and Doubles Draws	(Spain) Pablo Vivero González; 6–1, 6–3	(France) Kyrian Jacquet	(Egypt) Karim-Mohamed Maamoun (Italy) Julian Ocleppo	(Italy) Marco Mosciatti (Ukraine) Vladyslav Manafov (Poland) Daniel Michalski (United Kingdom) Billy Harris
October 21	Sharm El Sheikh, Egypt; Hard; M15; Singles and Doubles Draws	(United Kingdom) Julian Cash (Poland) Jan Zieliński; 7–6^{(7–2)}, 7–6^{(7–3)}	(Poland) Piotr Matuszewski (Poland) Daniel Michalski	(Egypt) Karim-Mohamed Maamoun (Italy) Julian Ocleppo	(Italy) Marco Mosciatti (Ukraine) Vladyslav Manafov (Poland) Daniel Michalski (United Kingdom) Billy Harris
October 21	Cancún, Mexico; Hard; M15; Singles and Doubles Draws	(Argentina) Maximiliano Estévez; 5–3, ret.	(Colombia) Cristian Rodríguez	(United States) Mwendwa Mbithi (Argentina) Mariano Kestelboim	(Colombia) Juan Sebastián Gómez (Mexico) Gerardo López Villaseñor (Switzerland) Luca Keist (Mexico) Tigre Hank
October 21	Cancún, Mexico; Hard; M15; Singles and Doubles Draws	(Colombia) Juan Sebastián Gómez (Mexico) Luis Patiño; Walkover	(Colombia) José Daniel Bendeck (Colombia) Cristian Rodríguez	(United States) Mwendwa Mbithi (Argentina) Mariano Kestelboim	(Colombia) Juan Sebastián Gómez (Mexico) Gerardo López Villaseñor (Switzerland) Luca Keist (Mexico) Tigre Hank
October 21	Doha, Qatar; Hard; M15; Singles and Doubles Draws	(Ukraine) Marat Deviatiarov; 6–2, 6–3	(Morocco) Adam Moundir	(Germany) Tobias Simon (Sweden) Gustav Hansson	(Slovenia) Tom Kočevar-Dešman (Sweden) Karl Friberg (Ukraine) Yurii Dzhavakian (China) Wang Chukang
October 21	Doha, Qatar; Hard; M15; Singles and Doubles Draws	(Netherlands) Guy den Heijer (Netherlands) Sidané Pontjodikromo; 7–6^{(8–6)}, 4–6, [10–6]	(Philippines) Francis Alcantara (Russia) Bogdan Bobrov	(Germany) Tobias Simon (Sweden) Gustav Hansson	(Slovenia) Tom Kočevar-Dešman (Sweden) Karl Friberg (Ukraine) Yurii Dzhavakian (China) Wang Chukang
October 21	Benicarló, Spain; Clay; M15; Singles and Doubles Draws	(Spain) Carlos Gimeno Valero; 6–1, 6–2	(Spain) Francisco Andreu García	(Spain) Álvaro López San Martín (Russia) Alexander Zhurbin	(Spain) Carlos Sánchez Jover (Switzerland) Johan Nikles (United States) Matthew Mendez (Spain) Pablo Llamas Ruiz
October 21	Benicarló, Spain; Clay; M15; Singles and Doubles Draws	(Spain) Pablo Llamas Ruiz (Spain) Benjamín Winter López; 6–3, 6–4	(Belgium) Zizou Bergs (Portugal) Tiago Cação	(Spain) Álvaro López San Martín (Russia) Alexander Zhurbin	(Spain) Carlos Sánchez Jover (Switzerland) Johan Nikles (United States) Matthew Mendez (Spain) Pablo Llamas Ruiz
October 21	Tabarka, Tunisia; Clay; M15; Singles and Doubles Draws	(Romania) Nicholas David Ionel; 6–4, 7–5	(Argentina) Manuel Peña López	(Belgium) Benjamin D'Hoe (France) Matthieu Perchicot	(Argentina) Mariano Navone (Italy) Fabrizio Ornago (Germany) Marlon Vankan (Argentina) Fermín Tenti
October 21	Tabarka, Tunisia; Clay; M15; Singles and Doubles Draws	(Argentina) Nicolás Alberto Arreche (Argentina) Franco Feitt; 2–6, 7–5, [10–6]	(Romania) Nicholas David Ionel (Romania) Petru-Alexandru Luncanu	(Belgium) Benjamin D'Hoe (France) Matthieu Perchicot	(Argentina) Mariano Navone (Italy) Fabrizio Ornago (Germany) Marlon Vankan (Argentina) Fermín Tenti
October 21	Antalya, Turkey; Clay; M15; Singles and Doubles Draws	(Italy) Lorenzo Musetti; 6–4, 6–1	(Russia) Ronald Slobodchikov	(Germany) Peter Heller (Belgium) Julien Cagnina	(Montenegro) Ljubomir Čelebić (Belgium) Arnaud Bovy (Turkey) Marsel İlhan (Czech Republic) Michael Vrbenský
October 21	Antalya, Turkey; Clay; M15; Singles and Doubles Draws	(Romania) Adrian Barbu (Romania) Ștefan Paloși; 1–6, 6–4, [10–5]	(Russia) Denis Klok (Ukraine) Oleg Prihodko	(Germany) Peter Heller (Belgium) Julien Cagnina	(Montenegro) Ljubomir Čelebić (Belgium) Arnaud Bovy (Turkey) Marsel İlhan (Czech Republic) Michael Vrbenský
October 28	Monastir, Tunisia; Hard; M25; Singles and Doubles Draws	(France) Alexandre Müller; 3–6, 7–6^{(7–5)}, 6–2	(Cyprus) Petros Chrysochos	(Germany) Peter Torebko (Italy) Gianluigi Quinzi	(France) Antoine Escoffier (Bulgaria) Alexander Donski (France) Evan Furness (Tunisia) Aziz Dougaz
October 28	Monastir, Tunisia; Hard; M25; Singles and Doubles Draws	(Tunisia) Aziz Dougaz (Burundi) Guy Orly Iradukunda; 6–2, 6–1	(Russia) Savriyan Danilov (Tunisia) Majed Kilani	(Germany) Peter Torebko (Italy) Gianluigi Quinzi	(France) Antoine Escoffier (Bulgaria) Alexander Donski (France) Evan Furness (Tunisia) Aziz Dougaz
October 28	Naples, United States; Clay; M25; Singles and Doubles Draws	(Argentina) Genaro Alberto Olivieri; 7–5, 6–3	(Colombia) Cristian Rodríguez	(Bulgaria) Adrian Andreev (United States) Jordi Arconada	(United States) Stefan Kozlov (Argentina) Mariano Kestelboim (Argentina) Alan Kohen (Republic of Ireland) Simon Carr
October 28	Naples, United States; Clay; M25; Singles and Doubles Draws	(Colombia) José Daniel Bendeck (Colombia) Cristian Rodríguez; 4–6, 6–2, [10–2]	(United States) Oliver Crawford (United States) Sam Riffice	(Bulgaria) Adrian Andreev (United States) Jordi Arconada	(United States) Stefan Kozlov (Argentina) Mariano Kestelboim (Argentina) Alan Kohen (Republic of Ireland) Simon Carr
October 28	Opava, Czech Republic; Carpet (indoor); M15; Singles and Doubles Draws	(Czech Republic) David Poljak; 6–4, 6–4	(Czech Republic) Petr Nouza	(Czech Republic) Robin Staněk (Czech Republic) Jaroslav Pospíšil	(Czech Republic) Michal Konečný (Italy) Mattia Bellucci (Poland) Michał Dembek (Czech Republic) Petr Michnev
October 28	Opava, Czech Republic; Carpet (indoor); M15; Singles and Doubles Draws	(Netherlands) Niels Lootsma (Czech Republic) Petr Nouza; 6–3, 7–6^{(7–3)}	(Czech Republic) Vít Kopřiva (Czech Republic) Jaroslav Pospíšil	(Czech Republic) Robin Staněk (Czech Republic) Jaroslav Pospíšil	(Czech Republic) Michal Konečný (Italy) Mattia Bellucci (Poland) Michał Dembek (Czech Republic) Petr Michnev
October 28	Sharm El Sheikh, Egypt; Hard; M15; Singles and Doubles Draws	(Spain) Pablo Vivero González; 6–4, 4–6, 7–5	(Poland) Kacper Żuk	(Italy) Julian Ocleppo (France) Kyrian Jacquet	(Italy) Giovanni Fonio (Ukraine) Vladyslav Manafov (United Kingdom) Julian Cash (Poland) Maciej Smoła
October 28	Sharm El Sheikh, Egypt; Hard; M15; Singles and Doubles Draws	(Poland) Jan Zieliński (Poland) Kacper Żuk; 6–3, 6–1	(Spain) Pablo Vivero González (Chinese Taipei) Yu Cheng-yu	(Italy) Julian Ocleppo (France) Kyrian Jacquet	(Italy) Giovanni Fonio (Ukraine) Vladyslav Manafov (United Kingdom) Julian Cash (Poland) Maciej Smoła
October 28	Pärnu, Estonia; Hard (indoor); M15; Singles and Doubles Draws	(Russia) Evgenii Tiurnev; 6–2, 7–6^{(7–2)}	(Estonia) Vladimir Ivanov	(Germany) Stefan Seifert (Germany) Lasse Muscheites	(Belgium) Maxime Pauwels (Ukraine) Oleksii Krutykh (Estonia) Daniil Glinka (France) Manuel Guinard
October 28	Pärnu, Estonia; Hard (indoor); M15; Singles and Doubles Draws	(Germany) Lasse Muscheites (Germany) Stefan Seifert; 6–3, 3–6, [10–4]	(Estonia) Vladimir Ivanov (Russia) Yan Sabanin	(Germany) Stefan Seifert (Germany) Lasse Muscheites	(Belgium) Maxime Pauwels (Ukraine) Oleksii Krutykh (Estonia) Daniil Glinka (France) Manuel Guinard
October 28	Mishref, Kuwait; Hard; M15; Singles and Doubles Draws	(Serbia) Marko Tepavac; 6–4, 6–2	(Venezuela) Ricardo Rodríguez	(Russia) Alexander Igoshin (Germany) Kai Wehnelt	(Ukraine) Vitaliy Sachko (Ukraine) Yurii Dzhavakian (Sweden) Karl Friberg (United States) Alec Adamson
October 28	Mishref, Kuwait; Hard; M15; Singles and Doubles Draws	(Switzerland) Antoine Bellier (Sweden) Jonathan Mridha; 6–1, 6–4	(Ukraine) Yurii Dzhavakian (Belarus) Mikalai Haliak	(Russia) Alexander Igoshin (Germany) Kai Wehnelt	(Ukraine) Vitaliy Sachko (Ukraine) Yurii Dzhavakian (Sweden) Karl Friberg (United States) Alec Adamson
October 28	Nules, Spain; Clay; M15; Singles and Doubles Draws	(Ukraine) Georgii Kravchenko; 4–6, 6–2, 7–6^{(7–4)}	(Switzerland) Johan Nikles	(Brazil) Jordan Correia (Switzerland) Damien Wenger	(Portugal) Tiago Cação (Spain) Imanol López Morillo (United States) Matthew Mendez (Russia) Yan Bondarevskiy
October 28	Nules, Spain; Clay; M15; Singles and Doubles Draws	(United Kingdom) Arthur Fery (France) Émilien Voisin; 7–6^{(7–2)}, 6–4	(Switzerland) Mirko Martinez (Switzerland) Damien Wenger	(Brazil) Jordan Correia (Switzerland) Damien Wenger	(Portugal) Tiago Cação (Spain) Imanol López Morillo (United States) Matthew Mendez (Russia) Yan Bondarevskiy
October 28	Tabarka, Tunisia; Clay; M15; Singles and Doubles Draws	(Romania) Nicholas David Ionel; 6–4, 4–6, 6–4	(Italy) Andrea Picchione	(Italy) Fabrizio Ornago (Hungary) Péter Nagy	(Romania) Nini Gabriel Dica (Argentina) Mariano Navone (Italy) Marco Miceli (France) Matthieu Perchicot
October 28	Tabarka, Tunisia; Clay; M15; Singles and Doubles Draws	(Romania) Nicholas David Ionel (Romania) Petru-Alexandru Luncanu; Walkover	(Italy) Gianmarco Ferrari (Italy) Nicolò Inserra	(Italy) Fabrizio Ornago (Hungary) Péter Nagy	(Romania) Nini Gabriel Dica (Argentina) Mariano Navone (Italy) Marco Miceli (France) Matthieu Perchicot
October 28	Antalya, Turkey; Clay; M15; Singles and Doubles Draws	(France) Jonathan Eysseric; 6–4, 6–3	(Russia) Ronald Slobodchikov	(Czech Republic) Michael Vrbenský (Serbia) Marko Miladinović	(Turkey) Yankı Erel (Germany) Marvin Netuschil (Italy) Davide Galoppini (Ukraine) Oleg Prihodko
October 28	Antalya, Turkey; Clay; M15; Singles and Doubles Draws	(Kazakhstan) Grigoriy Lomakin (Ukraine) Oleg Prihodko; 6–4, 6–3	(Netherlands) Mats Hermans (Netherlands) Bart Stevens	(Czech Republic) Michael Vrbenský (Serbia) Marko Miladinović	(Turkey) Yankı Erel (Germany) Marvin Netuschil (Italy) Davide Galoppini (Ukraine) Oleg Prihodko

=== November ===
Week of	Tournament	Winner	Runners-up	Semifinalists	Quarterfinalists
November 4	Saint-Dizier, France; Hard (indoor); M25; Singles and Doubles Draws	(France) Hugo Grenier; 6–1, 7–5	(France) Harold Mayot	(France) Benjamin Bonzi (France) Corentin Denolly	(Germany) Daniel Masur (Germany) Elmar Ejupovic (France) Louis Dussin (France) Alexis Gautier
November 4	Saint-Dizier, France; Hard (indoor); M25; Singles and Doubles Draws	(France) Antoine Cornut-Chauvinc (France) Harold Mayot; 6–4, 0–6, [10–8]	(France) Benjamin Bonzi (France) Corentin Denolly	(France) Benjamin Bonzi (France) Corentin Denolly	(Germany) Daniel Masur (Germany) Elmar Ejupovic (France) Louis Dussin (France) Alexis Gautier
November 4	Malibu, United States; Hard; M25; Singles and Doubles Draws	(Germany) Daniel Altmaier; 6–2, 6–4	(United States) Alexander Sarkissian	(United States) Felix Corwin (United States) Collin Altamirano	(Argentina) Axel Geller (Colombia) Alejandro Gómez (United States) Evan Song (United States) Brandon Holt
November 4	Malibu, United States; Hard; M25; Singles and Doubles Draws	(Colombia) Alejandro Gómez (United States) Junior Alexander Ore; 6–3, 6–7^{(14–16)}, [10–7]	(United States) Austin Rapp (United States) Martin Redlicki	(United States) Felix Corwin (United States) Collin Altamirano	(Argentina) Axel Geller (Colombia) Alejandro Gómez (United States) Evan Song (United States) Brandon Holt
November 4	Prague, Czech Republic; Hard (indoor); M15; Singles and Doubles Draws	(France) Manuel Guinard; 7–6^{(7–3)}, 6–3	(Czech Republic) Michael Vrbenský	(Ukraine) Oleksii Krutykh (Czech Republic) Marek Gengel	(Austria) Lucas Miedler (Russia) Artem Dubrivnyy (Italy) Emiliano Maggioli (Czech Republic) Andrew Paulson
November 4	Prague, Czech Republic; Hard (indoor); M15; Singles and Doubles Draws	(Czech Republic) Marek Gengel (Czech Republic) Michael Vrbenský; 2–6, 6–3, [10–6]	(Czech Republic) Vít Kopřiva (Czech Republic) Jaroslav Pospíšil	(Ukraine) Oleksii Krutykh (Czech Republic) Marek Gengel	(Austria) Lucas Miedler (Russia) Artem Dubrivnyy (Italy) Emiliano Maggioli (Czech Republic) Andrew Paulson
November 4	Sharm El Sheikh, Egypt; Hard; M15; Singles and Doubles Draws	(Egypt) Karim-Mohamed Maamoun; 6–3, 7–5	(Spain) Pablo Vivero González	(Lithuania) Laurynas Grigelis (Italy) Alessandro Bega	(Belgium) Clément Geens (Ukraine) Vladyslav Manafov (Netherlands) Jesper de Jong (Netherlands) Sidané Pontjodikromo
November 4	Sharm El Sheikh, Egypt; Hard; M15; Singles and Doubles Draws	(Kazakhstan) Sagadat Ayap (Germany) Kai Lemstra; 6–1, 7–6^{(7–2)}	(Poland) Piotr Matuszewski (Poland) Kacper Żuk	(Lithuania) Laurynas Grigelis (Italy) Alessandro Bega	(Belgium) Clément Geens (Ukraine) Vladyslav Manafov (Netherlands) Jesper de Jong (Netherlands) Sidané Pontjodikromo
November 4	Heraklion, Greece; Hard; M15; Singles and Doubles Draws	(France) Geoffrey Blancaneaux; 6–1, 6–2	(Israel) Yshai Oliel	(Monaco) Lucas Catarina (Spain) Pedro Vives Marcos	(United Kingdom) Anton Matusevich (Ukraine) Nikita Mashtakov (United Kingdom) Billy Harris (Austria) Alexander Erler
November 4	Heraklion, Greece; Hard; M15; Singles and Doubles Draws	(United Kingdom) Luke Johnson (Poland) Jan Zieliński; 1–6, 6–2, [12–10]	(Switzerland) Adrian Bodmer (Austria) Jonas Trinker	(Monaco) Lucas Catarina (Spain) Pedro Vives Marcos	(United Kingdom) Anton Matusevich (Ukraine) Nikita Mashtakov (United Kingdom) Billy Harris (Austria) Alexander Erler
November 4	Mishref, Kuwait; Hard; M15; Singles and Doubles Draws	(Serbia) Marko Tepavac; 6–4, 6–4	(France) Valentin Royer	(Austria) David Pichler (Switzerland) Antoine Bellier	(India) Adil Kalyanpur (Georgia (country)) Aleksandre Bakshi (Germany) Kai Wehnelt (Thailand) Krittin Koaykul
November 4	Mishref, Kuwait; Hard; M15; Singles and Doubles Draws	(Austria) David Pichler (Ukraine) Vitaliy Sachko; 6–4, 6–1	(India) Adil Kalyanpur (Germany) Kai Wehnelt	(Austria) David Pichler (Switzerland) Antoine Bellier	(India) Adil Kalyanpur (Georgia (country)) Aleksandre Bakshi (Germany) Kai Wehnelt (Thailand) Krittin Koaykul
November 4	Cancún, Mexico; Hard; M15; Singles and Doubles Draws	(Brazil) João Lucas Reis da Silva; 6–2, 6–4	(Northern Mariana Islands) Colin Sinclair	(United Kingdom) Paul Jubb (United States) Nick Chappell	(Peru) Jorge Panta (Mexico) Tigre Hank (United States) Zane Khan (Mexico) Gerardo López Villaseñor
November 4	Cancún, Mexico; Hard; M15; Singles and Doubles Draws	(Peru) Arklon Huertas del Pino (Peru) Conner Huertas del Pino; 6–4, 7–5	(Republic of Ireland) Julian Bradley (Australia) Cameron Green	(United Kingdom) Paul Jubb (United States) Nick Chappell	(Peru) Jorge Panta (Mexico) Tigre Hank (United States) Zane Khan (Mexico) Gerardo López Villaseñor
November 4	Maputo, Mozambique; Hard; M15; Singles and Doubles Draws	(Spain) David Pérez Sanz; 7–5, 6–3	(Zimbabwe) Takanyi Garanganga	(Zimbabwe) Benjamin Lock (Canada) Kelsey Stevenson	(Ukraine) Eric Vanshelboim (Iran) Hamidreza Nadaf (Spain) José Francisco Vidal Azorín (United States) Dennis Uspensky
November 4	Maputo, Mozambique; Hard; M15; Singles and Doubles Draws	(Zimbabwe) Benjamin Lock (Zimbabwe) Courtney John Lock; 6–4, 6–3	(Australia) Jake Delaney (Mozambique) Bruno Nhavene	(Zimbabwe) Benjamin Lock (Canada) Kelsey Stevenson	(Ukraine) Eric Vanshelboim (Iran) Hamidreza Nadaf (Spain) José Francisco Vidal Azorín (United States) Dennis Uspensky
November 4	Castellón de la Plana, Spain; Clay; M15; Singles and Doubles Draws	(Spain) Ricardo Ojeda Lara; 6–3, 6–2	(Spain) Javier Martí	(Spain) Eduard Esteve Lobato (Switzerland) Johan Nikles	(Spain) Álvaro López San Martín (Spain) Carlos Boluda-Purkiss (Brazil) Jordan Correia (Spain) Diego Augusto Barreto Sánchez
November 4	Castellón de la Plana, Spain; Clay; M15; Singles and Doubles Draws	(Portugal) Francisco Cabral (Portugal) Gonçalo Falcão; 6–3, 4–6, [10–8]	(Spain) Eduard Esteve Lobato (Spain) Oriol Roca Batalla	(Spain) Eduard Esteve Lobato (Switzerland) Johan Nikles	(Spain) Álvaro López San Martín (Spain) Carlos Boluda-Purkiss (Brazil) Jordan Correia (Spain) Diego Augusto Barreto Sánchez
November 4	Monastir, Tunisia; Hard; M15; Singles and Doubles Draws	(Croatia) Matija Pecotić; 6–1, 6–1	(Turkey) Altuğ Çelikbilek	(Canada) Taha Baadi (France) Louis Tessa	(France) Lucas Poullain (United States) Maksim Tikhomirov (Bosnia and Herzegovina) Aziz Kijametović (Tunisia) Majed Kilani
November 4	Monastir, Tunisia; Hard; M15; Singles and Doubles Draws	(Tunisia) Majed Kilani (France) Louis Tessa; 6–3, 6–4	(Netherlands) Daniel de Jonge (Belgium) Olivier Rojas	(Canada) Taha Baadi (France) Louis Tessa	(France) Lucas Poullain (United States) Maksim Tikhomirov (Bosnia and Herzegovina) Aziz Kijametović (Tunisia) Majed Kilani
November 4	Antalya, Turkey; Clay; M15; Singles and Doubles Draws	(Romania) Alexandru Jecan; 1–6, 6–4, 6–2	(Russia) Alexander Shevchenko	(Serbia) Miljan Zekić (Hungary) Fábián Marozsán	(Italy) Riccardo Bonadio (Turkey) Sarp Ağabigün (Argentina) Nicolás Alberto Arreche (Germany) Marvin Netuschil
November 4	Antalya, Turkey; Clay; M15; Singles and Doubles Draws	(Hungary) Péter Fajta (Hungary) Fábián Marozsán; 7–6^{(7–5)}, 3–6, [14–12]	(Italy) Stefano Battaglino (Italy) Riccardo Bonadio	(Serbia) Miljan Zekić (Hungary) Fábián Marozsán	(Italy) Riccardo Bonadio (Turkey) Sarp Ağabigün (Argentina) Nicolás Alberto Arreche (Germany) Marvin Netuschil
November 11	Orlando, United States; Clay; M25; Singles and Doubles Draws	(Peru) Nicolás Álvarez; 3–6, 6–2, 6–1	(Brazil) Pedro Sakamoto	(Spain) Javier Barranco Cosano (Argentina) Tomás Martín Etcheverry	(United States) Ulises Blanch (Romania) Dragoș Constantin Ignat (Chile) Bastián Malla (Morocco) Adam Moundir
November 11	Orlando, United States; Clay; M25; Singles and Doubles Draws	(Peru) Nicolás Álvarez (Brazil) Pedro Sakamoto; 7–6^{(7–3)}, 4–6, [10–8]	(United States) Charlie Emhardt (United States) Alfredo Perez	(Spain) Javier Barranco Cosano (Argentina) Tomás Martín Etcheverry	(United States) Ulises Blanch (Romania) Dragoș Constantin Ignat (Chile) Bastián Malla (Morocco) Adam Moundir
November 11	Milovice, Czech Republic; Hard (indoor); M15; Singles and Doubles Draws	(Czech Republic) Jan Šátral; 6–3, 6–3	(Czech Republic) Martin Krumich	(Ukraine) Vadym Ursu (Italy) Riccardo Balzerani	(Czech Republic) Filip Duda (Czech Republic) Andrew Paulson (United Kingdom) Mark Whitehouse (Ukraine) Oleksii Krutykh
November 11	Milovice, Czech Republic; Hard (indoor); M15; Singles and Doubles Draws	(Czech Republic) Petr Michnev (Czech Republic) Andrew Paulson; 6–1, 7–5	(Italy) Francesco Vilardo (United Kingdom) Mark Whitehouse	(Ukraine) Vadym Ursu (Italy) Riccardo Balzerani	(Czech Republic) Filip Duda (Czech Republic) Andrew Paulson (United Kingdom) Mark Whitehouse (Ukraine) Oleksii Krutykh
November 11	Sharm El Sheikh, Egypt; Hard; M15; Singles and Doubles Draws	(Egypt) Karim-Mohamed Maamoun; 6–7^{(2–7)}, 6–3, 6–4	(Russia) Alexey Zakharov	(Ukraine) Vladyslav Manafov (Spain) Pablo Vivero González	(Netherlands) Ryan Nijboer (Czech Republic) Marek Gengel (Italy) Giorgio Ricca (Lithuania) Laurynas Grigelis
November 11	Sharm El Sheikh, Egypt; Hard; M15; Singles and Doubles Draws	(Lithuania) Laurynas Grigelis (Ukraine) Vladyslav Manafov; 6–2, 7–5	(Czech Republic) Marek Gengel (Czech Republic) Tomáš Papík	(Ukraine) Vladyslav Manafov (Spain) Pablo Vivero González	(Netherlands) Ryan Nijboer (Czech Republic) Marek Gengel (Italy) Giorgio Ricca (Lithuania) Laurynas Grigelis
November 11	Villers-lès-Nancy, France; Hard (indoor); M15; Singles and Doubles Draws	(France) Harold Mayot; 6–4, 6–2	(France) Ronan Joncour	(Netherlands) Justin Eleveld (France) Titouan Droguet	(Germany) Mats Rosenkranz (France) Thomas Laurent (Italy) Marco Brugnerotto (France) Kyrian Jacquet
November 11	Villers-lès-Nancy, France; Hard (indoor); M15; Singles and Doubles Draws	(Switzerland) Jakub Paul (Switzerland) Yannik Steinegger; 4–6, 6–4, [13–11]	(France) Sébastien Boltz (France) Arthur Bouquier	(Netherlands) Justin Eleveld (France) Titouan Droguet	(Germany) Mats Rosenkranz (France) Thomas Laurent (Italy) Marco Brugnerotto (France) Kyrian Jacquet
November 11	Heraklion, Greece; Hard; M15; Singles and Doubles Draws	(Austria) Alexander Erler; 7–5, 6–1	(Poland) Jan Zieliński	(Israel) Yshai Oliel (United States) Patrick Kypson	(Netherlands) Mick Veldheer (Ukraine) Nikita Mashtakov (Austria) Jonas Trinker (Spain) Pedro Vives Marcos
November 11	Heraklion, Greece; Hard; M15; Singles and Doubles Draws	(Austria) Alexander Erler (Austria) Neil Oberleitner; 6–4, 6–0	(United Kingdom) Luke Johnson (Poland) Jan Zieliński	(Israel) Yshai Oliel (United States) Patrick Kypson	(Netherlands) Mick Veldheer (Ukraine) Nikita Mashtakov (Austria) Jonas Trinker (Spain) Pedro Vives Marcos
November 11	Mishref, Kuwait; Hard; M15; Singles and Doubles Draws	(Belgium) Gauthier Onclin; 6–3, 6–4	(Germany) Kai Wehnelt	(France) Valentin Royer (Serbia) Marko Tepavac	(Ukraine) Vitaliy Sachko (Ukraine) Yurii Dzhavakian (Japan) Soichiro Moritani (Sweden) Simon Freund
November 11	Mishref, Kuwait; Hard; M15; Singles and Doubles Draws	(Japan) Soichiro Moritani (Japan) Kento Takeuchi; 7–6^{(7–1)}, 6–4	(Hungary) Mátyás Füle (Ukraine) Vitaliy Sachko	(France) Valentin Royer (Serbia) Marko Tepavac	(Ukraine) Vitaliy Sachko (Ukraine) Yurii Dzhavakian (Japan) Soichiro Moritani (Sweden) Simon Freund
November 11	Cancún, Mexico; Hard; M15; Singles and Doubles Draws	(United Kingdom) Paul Jubb; 7–6^{(7–3)}, 6–0	(Brazil) João Lucas Reis da Silva	(Canada) David Volfson (Mexico) Tigre Hank	(Russia) Alexander Zhurbin (Peru) Jorge Panta (Peru) Arklon Huertas del Pino (Argentina) Mariano Kestelboim
November 11	Cancún, Mexico; Hard; M15; Singles and Doubles Draws	(Peru) Arklon Huertas del Pino (Peru) Conner Huertas del Pino; 6–2, 6–4	(United States) Nicholas Bybel (Canada) David Volfson	(Canada) David Volfson (Mexico) Tigre Hank	(Russia) Alexander Zhurbin (Peru) Jorge Panta (Peru) Arklon Huertas del Pino (Argentina) Mariano Kestelboim
November 11	Maputo, Mozambique; Hard; M15; Singles and Doubles Draws	(Canada) Kelsey Stevenson; 7–6^{(7–3)}, 6–2	(Spain) David Pérez Sanz	(Zimbabwe) Benjamin Lock (Czech Republic) Dominik Palán	(India) Rishab Agarwal (United States) Dennis Uspensky (United Kingdom) Alexis Canter (Zimbabwe) Takanyi Garanganga
November 11	Maputo, Mozambique; Hard; M15; Singles and Doubles Draws	(Canada) Raheel Manji (Canada) Kelsey Stevenson; 6–4, 7–5	(South Africa) Vasilios Caripi (South Africa) Vaughn Hunter	(Zimbabwe) Benjamin Lock (Czech Republic) Dominik Palán	(India) Rishab Agarwal (United States) Dennis Uspensky (United Kingdom) Alexis Canter (Zimbabwe) Takanyi Garanganga
November 11	Monastir, Tunisia; Hard; M15; Singles and Doubles Draws	(Estonia) Kristjan Tamm; 6–3, 6–1	(Italy) Andrea Guerrieri	(Bosnia and Herzegovina) Aziz Kijametović (Italy) Daniele Capecchi	(Japan) Naoki Tajima (Italy) Giacomo Dambrosi (Spain) Benjamín Winter López (Italy) Luca Giacomini
November 11	Monastir, Tunisia; Hard; M15; Singles and Doubles Draws	(France) Damien Bayard (Brazil) Igor Marcondes; 6–1, 6–1	(Belgium) Simon Beaupain (Belgium) Clément Geens	(Bosnia and Herzegovina) Aziz Kijametović (Italy) Daniele Capecchi	(Japan) Naoki Tajima (Italy) Giacomo Dambrosi (Spain) Benjamín Winter López (Italy) Luca Giacomini
November 11	Antalya, Turkey; Clay; M15; Singles and Doubles Draws	(Bulgaria) Dimitar Kuzmanov; 6–4, 2–6, 6–1	(Argentina) Hernán Casanova	(France) Luka Pavlovic (Romania) Alexandru Jecan	(Russia) Maxim Ratniuk (Romania) Dragoș Dima (Serbia) Miljan Zekić (Romania) Bogdan Ionuț Apostol
November 11	Antalya, Turkey; Clay; M15; Singles and Doubles Draws	(Argentina) Nicolás Alberto Arreche (Argentina) Matías Zukas; 7–6^{(7–3)}, 6–3	(Kazakhstan) Grigoriy Lomakin (Russia) Maxim Ratniuk	(France) Luka Pavlovic (Romania) Alexandru Jecan	(Russia) Maxim Ratniuk (Romania) Dragoș Dima (Serbia) Miljan Zekić (Romania) Bogdan Ionuț Apostol
November 18	Naples, United States; Clay; M25; Singles and Doubles Draws	(Argentina) Tomás Martín Etcheverry; 7–6^{(7–4)}, 7–5	(United States) Martin Damm	(Argentina) Juan Pablo Ficovich (Spain) Javier Barranco Cosano	(Germany) Peter Heller (Peru) Nicolás Álvarez (United States) Alexander Ritschard (Argentina) Sebastián Báez
November 18	Naples, United States; Clay; M25; Singles and Doubles Draws	(Argentina) Tomás Martín Etcheverry (Argentina) Camilo Ugo Carabelli; 6–4, 6–0	(Belgium) Benjamin D'Hoe (France) Maxime Mora	(Argentina) Juan Pablo Ficovich (Spain) Javier Barranco Cosano	(Germany) Peter Heller (Peru) Nicolás Álvarez (United States) Alexander Ritschard (Argentina) Sebastián Báez
November 18	Sharm El Sheikh, Egypt; Hard; M15; Singles and Doubles Draws	(Russia) Alexey Zakharov; 6–4, 6–1	(Germany) Lucas Hellfritsch	(Netherlands) Ryan Nijboer (Czech Republic) Marek Gengel	(Italy) Luca Potenza (Netherlands) Zachary Eisinga (Japan) Yuichiro Inui (Ukraine) Vladyslav Manafov
November 18	Sharm El Sheikh, Egypt; Hard; M15; Singles and Doubles Draws	(Poland) Piotr Matuszewski (Poland) Maciej Smoła; 6–2, 6–1	(Ukraine) Volodymyr Uzhylovskyi (Russia) Alexey Zakharov	(Netherlands) Ryan Nijboer (Czech Republic) Marek Gengel	(Italy) Luca Potenza (Netherlands) Zachary Eisinga (Japan) Yuichiro Inui (Ukraine) Vladyslav Manafov
November 18	Sarreguemines, France; Carpet (indoor); M15; Singles and Doubles Draws	(Switzerland) Antoine Bellier; 6–4, 7–6^{(7–2)}	(Germany) Tobias Simon	(France) Hugo Schott (France) Thomas Laurent	(United Kingdom) Jan Choinski (Sweden) Jonathan Mridha (France) Antoine Cornut-Chauvinc (Germany) Elmar Ejupovic
November 18	Sarreguemines, France; Carpet (indoor); M15; Singles and Doubles Draws	(United Kingdom) Jan Choinski (Germany) Luca Gelhardt; 6–3, 6–4	(France) Arthur Bouquier (France) Louis Dussin	(France) Hugo Schott (France) Thomas Laurent	(United Kingdom) Jan Choinski (Sweden) Jonathan Mridha (France) Antoine Cornut-Chauvinc (Germany) Elmar Ejupovic
November 18	Heraklion, Greece; Hard; M15; Singles and Doubles Draws	(Netherlands) Mick Veldheer; 7–6^{(7–3)}, 7–6^{(7–4)}	(Russia) Bogdan Bobrov	(Croatia) Matija Pecotić (United States) Vasil Kirkov	(Greece) Markos Kalovelonis (United States) Alexander Lebedev (Austria) Lenny Hampel (Bulgaria) Simon Anthony Ivanov
November 18	Heraklion, Greece; Hard; M15; Singles and Doubles Draws	(Slovenia) Tom Kočevar-Dešman (United States) Alexander Lebedev; 6–3, 6–4	(Romania) Adrian Barbu (Romania) Ștefan Paloși	(Croatia) Matija Pecotić (United States) Vasil Kirkov	(Greece) Markos Kalovelonis (United States) Alexander Lebedev (Austria) Lenny Hampel (Bulgaria) Simon Anthony Ivanov
November 18	Cancún, Mexico; Hard; M15; Singles and Doubles Draws	(Brazil) Mateus Alves; 2–6, 6–1, 6–4	(United States) Nick Chappell	(Mexico) Gerardo López Villaseñor (Brazil) Matheus Pucinelli de Almeida	(Romania) Filip Cristian Jianu (United States) Connor Farren (United States) Gage Brymer (United States) Zane Khan
November 18	Cancún, Mexico; Hard; M15; Singles and Doubles Draws	(Hong Kong) Skyler Butts (United States) Nicholas Bybel; 7–5, 7–5	(Australia) Cameron Green (New Zealand) Ajeet Rai	(Mexico) Gerardo López Villaseñor (Brazil) Matheus Pucinelli de Almeida	(Romania) Filip Cristian Jianu (United States) Connor Farren (United States) Gage Brymer (United States) Zane Khan
November 18	Monastir, Tunisia; Hard; M15; Singles and Doubles Draws	(Belgium) Arnaud Bovy; 6–1, 3–6, 6–3	(Ukraine) Georgii Kravchenko	(Belgium) Clément Geens (Spain) Nicolás Álvarez Varona	(Italy) Daniele Capecchi (Japan) Rimpei Kawakami (Tunisia) Majed Kilani (United States) Nicolas Moreno de Alboran
November 18	Monastir, Tunisia; Hard; M15; Singles and Doubles Draws	(Belgium) Zizou Bergs (Italy) Francesco Vilardo; 6–3, 6–4	(Tunisia) Aziz Dougaz (Zimbabwe) Benjamin Lock	(Belgium) Clément Geens (Spain) Nicolás Álvarez Varona	(Italy) Daniele Capecchi (Japan) Rimpei Kawakami (Tunisia) Majed Kilani (United States) Nicolas Moreno de Alboran
November 18	Antalya, Turkey; Clay; M15; Singles and Doubles Draws	(Croatia) Duje Ajduković; 6–2, 6–4	(Spain) Álvaro López San Martín	(Brazil) Gilbert Klier Júnior (Romania) Alexandru Jecan	(Argentina) Hernán Casanova (Bulgaria) Dimitar Kuzmanov (Argentina) Matías Zukas (Brazil) Bruno Sant'Anna
November 18	Antalya, Turkey; Clay; M15; Singles and Doubles Draws	(Croatia) Duje Ajduković (Croatia) Karlo Kranić; 6–3, 3–6, [10–6]	(Romania) Dragoș Dima (Romania) Alexandru Jecan	(Brazil) Gilbert Klier Júnior (Romania) Alexandru Jecan	(Argentina) Hernán Casanova (Bulgaria) Dimitar Kuzmanov (Argentina) Matías Zukas (Brazil) Bruno Sant'Anna
November 18	Austin, United States; Hard; M15; Singles and Doubles Draws	(United States) Collin Altamirano; 4–6, 6–4, 6–4	(United Kingdom) Jacob Fearnley	(South Africa) Ruan Roelofse (United States) Siem Woldeab	(Lebanon) Hady Habib (United States) Harrison Adams (United States) Evan Zhu (United States) Tyler Zink
November 18	Austin, United States; Hard; M15; Singles and Doubles Draws	(United States) Eliot Spizzirri (United States) Tyler Zink; 4–6, 6–3, [10–7]	(United States) Justin Butsch (United States) Ian Dempster	(South Africa) Ruan Roelofse (United States) Siem Woldeab	(Lebanon) Hady Habib (United States) Harrison Adams (United States) Evan Zhu (United States) Tyler Zink
November 18	East Lansing, United States; Hard (indoor); M15; Singles and Doubles Draws	(Germany) Daniel Altmaier; 4–6, 6–3, 6–0	(Belgium) Michael Geerts	(United States) Cannon Kingsley (Germany) Lucas Gerch	(United States) Ezekiel Clark (United States) Jacob Dunbar (United States) Strong Kirchheimer (United States) Kyle Seelig
November 18	East Lansing, United States; Hard (indoor); M15; Singles and Doubles Draws	(United States) Jacob Dunbar (United Kingdom) David Fox; 6–4, 7–6^{(7–3)}	(Canada) Gabriel Diallo (United Kingdom) Millen Hurrion	(United States) Cannon Kingsley (Germany) Lucas Gerch	(United States) Ezekiel Clark (United States) Jacob Dunbar (United States) Strong Kirchheimer (United States) Kyle Seelig
November 25	Santo Domingo, Dominican Republic; Hard; M15; Singles and Doubles Draws	(Germany) Daniel Altmaier; 6–3, 4–6, 6–4	(United Kingdom) Jan Choinski	(United Kingdom) Paul Jubb (Dominican Republic) Nick Hardt	(Peru) Arklon Huertas del Pino (Peru) Mauricio Echazú (Dominican Republic) José Olivares (Venezuela) Ricardo Rodríguez
November 25	Santo Domingo, Dominican Republic; Hard; M15; Singles and Doubles Draws	(Peru) Arklon Huertas del Pino (Argentina) Camilo Ugo Carabelli; 7–6^{(7–2)}, 6–3	(United Kingdom) Jan Choinski (France) Maxime Mora	(United Kingdom) Paul Jubb (Dominican Republic) Nick Hardt	(Peru) Arklon Huertas del Pino (Peru) Mauricio Echazú (Dominican Republic) José Olivares (Venezuela) Ricardo Rodríguez
November 25	Cairo, Egypt; Clay; M15; Singles and Doubles Draws	(Poland) Daniel Michalski; 6–4, 6–3	(Argentina) Facundo Juárez	(Spain) Roberto Ortega Olmedo (Italy) Fabrizio Ornago	(Hungary) Péter Nagy (Brazil) Jordan Correia (Spain) Pol Martín Tiffon (Ukraine) Oleg Prihodko
November 25	Cairo, Egypt; Clay; M15; Singles and Doubles Draws	(Italy) Fabrizio Ornago (Argentina) Matías Zukas; 3–2, ret.	(Poland) Piotr Matuszewski (Poland) Daniel Michalski	(Spain) Roberto Ortega Olmedo (Italy) Fabrizio Ornago	(Hungary) Péter Nagy (Brazil) Jordan Correia (Spain) Pol Martín Tiffon (Ukraine) Oleg Prihodko
November 25	Heraklion, Greece; Hard; M15; Singles and Doubles Draws	(Croatia) Matija Pecotić; 6–3, 7–5	(Ukraine) Artem Smirnov	(Russia) Bogdan Bobrov (Israel) Yshai Oliel	(Germany) Daniel Masur (Ukraine) Vitaliy Sachko (Bulgaria) Alexandar Lazarov (South Korea) Park Ui-sung
November 25	Heraklion, Greece; Hard; M15; Singles and Doubles Draws	(Austria) David Pichler (Ukraine) Vitaliy Sachko; 7–6^{(7–2)}, 6–4	(Switzerland) Rémy Bertola (Germany) Daniel Masur	(Russia) Bogdan Bobrov (Israel) Yshai Oliel	(Germany) Daniel Masur (Ukraine) Vitaliy Sachko (Bulgaria) Alexandar Lazarov (South Korea) Park Ui-sung
November 25	Telde, Spain; Clay; M15; Singles and Doubles Draws	(France) Nathan Seateun; 6–2, 6–0	(France) Alexis Musialek	(Spain) Imanol López Morillo (Spain) Ricardo Ojeda Lara	(Poland) Kacper Żuk (Chile) Bastián Malla (Germany) Marvin Netuschil (United States) Dennis Uspensky
November 25	Telde, Spain; Clay; M15; Singles and Doubles Draws	(Venezuela) Jordi Muñoz Abreu (Spain) David Pérez Sanz; 6–4, 6–3	(Spain) José Joaquín Miranda Cisneros (Spain) David Vega Hernández	(Spain) Imanol López Morillo (Spain) Ricardo Ojeda Lara	(Poland) Kacper Żuk (Chile) Bastián Malla (Germany) Marvin Netuschil (United States) Dennis Uspensky
November 25	Nonthaburi, Thailand; Hard; M15; Singles and Doubles Draws	(South Korea) Lee Duck-hee; 6–1, 6–4	(Japan) Shintaro Imai	(France) Florent Bax (South Korea) Nam Ji-sung	(Japan) Keisuke Saitoh (Thailand) Thantub Suksumrarn (France) Benjamin Pietri (Japan) Sora Fukuda
November 25	Nonthaburi, Thailand; Hard; M15; Singles and Doubles Draws	(South Korea) Chung Hong (South Korea) Nam Ji-sung; 1–6, 6–3, [10–7]	(South Korea) Lee Jea-moon (South Korea) Song Min-kyu	(France) Florent Bax (South Korea) Nam Ji-sung	(Japan) Keisuke Saitoh (Thailand) Thantub Suksumrarn (France) Benjamin Pietri (Japan) Sora Fukuda
November 25	Monastir, Tunisia; Hard; M15; Singles and Doubles Draws	(Tunisia) Aziz Dougaz; 6–3, 6–4	(Czech Republic) Jan Šátral	(Russia) Evgenii Tiurnev (Italy) Mattia Frinzi	(Ukraine) Georgii Kravchenko (Spain) Nicolás Álvarez Varona (Germany) Kai Wehnelt (United States) Nicolas Moreno de Alboran
November 25	Monastir, Tunisia; Hard; M15; Singles and Doubles Draws	(Tunisia) Aziz Dougaz (Zimbabwe) Benjamin Lock; 6–7^{(6–8)}, 6–2, [10–8]	(Czech Republic) Ondřej Krstev (Czech Republic) Jan Šátral	(Russia) Evgenii Tiurnev (Italy) Mattia Frinzi	(Ukraine) Georgii Kravchenko (Spain) Nicolás Álvarez Varona (Germany) Kai Wehnelt (United States) Nicolas Moreno de Alboran
November 25	Antalya, Turkey; Clay; M15; Singles and Doubles Draws	(Serbia) Miljan Zekić; 3–6, 6–4, 7–6^{(7–4)}	(Russia) Pavel Kotov	(Turkey) Sarp Ağabigün (Russia) Ronald Slobodchikov	(United States) Tristan Boyer (Czech Republic) Pavel Nejedlý (Germany) Luca Gelhardt (Croatia) Duje Ajduković
November 25	Antalya, Turkey; Clay; M15; Singles and Doubles Draws	(Croatia) Duje Ajduković (Serbia) Miljan Zekić; 6–3, 6–3	(Russia) Vladimir Korolev (Russia) Andrey Uvarov	(Turkey) Sarp Ağabigün (Russia) Ronald Slobodchikov	(United States) Tristan Boyer (Czech Republic) Pavel Nejedlý (Germany) Luca Gelhardt (Croatia) Duje Ajduković
November 25	Maldonado, Uruguay; Clay; M15; Singles and Doubles Draws	(Argentina) Santiago Rodríguez Taverna; 3–6, 6–2, 6–1	(Argentina) Mariano Kestelboim	(Argentina) Gabriel Alejandro Hidalgo (Argentina) Francisco Comesaña	(Argentina) Santiago Besada (Argentina) Federico Moreno (Argentina) Mariano Navone (Argentina) Franco Emanuel Egea
November 25	Maldonado, Uruguay; Clay; M15; Singles and Doubles Draws	(Argentina) Gabriel Alejandro Hidalgo (Argentina) Federico Moreno; 6–4, 6–4	(Argentina) Franco Emanuel Egea (Argentina) Guido Iván Justo	(Argentina) Gabriel Alejandro Hidalgo (Argentina) Francisco Comesaña	(Argentina) Santiago Besada (Argentina) Federico Moreno (Argentina) Mariano Navone (Argentina) Franco Emanuel Egea

=== December ===
Week of	Tournament	Winner	Runners-up	Semifinalists	Quarterfinalists
December 2	Santa Marta, Colombia; Hard; M15; Singles and Doubles Draws	(Colombia) Alejandro Gómez; 4–6, 6–1, 6–4	(Colombia) Nicolás Barrientos	(Colombia) Nicolás Mejía (Colombia) Juan Sebastián Gómez	(Colombia) Gregorio Cordonnier (Uruguay) Ignacio Carou (Ecuador) Antonio Cayetano March (Bolivia) Alejandro Mendoza
December 2	Santa Marta, Colombia; Hard; M15; Singles and Doubles Draws	(Colombia) Nicolás Barrientos (Colombia) Alejandro Gómez; 6–3, 6–4	(Colombia) Alejandro Hoyos Franco (Ecuador) Antonio Cayetano March	(Colombia) Nicolás Mejía (Colombia) Juan Sebastián Gómez	(Colombia) Gregorio Cordonnier (Uruguay) Ignacio Carou (Ecuador) Antonio Cayetano March (Bolivia) Alejandro Mendoza
December 2	Santo Domingo, Dominican Republic; Hard; M15; Singles and Doubles Draws	(United Kingdom) Jan Choinski; 6–0, 6–0	(Argentina) Camilo Ugo Carabelli	(United Kingdom) Paul Jubb (Bolivia) Federico Zeballos	(Dominican Republic) José Olivares (Venezuela) Ricardo Rodríguez (United States) Blaise Bicknell (Sweden) Simon Yitbarek
December 2	Santo Domingo, Dominican Republic; Hard; M15; Singles and Doubles Draws	(Dominican Republic) José Olivares (Venezuela) Ricardo Rodríguez; 3–6, 6–3, [10–8]	(Peru) Arklon Huertas del Pino (Bolivia) Federico Zeballos	(United Kingdom) Paul Jubb (Bolivia) Federico Zeballos	(Dominican Republic) José Olivares (Venezuela) Ricardo Rodríguez (United States) Blaise Bicknell (Sweden) Simon Yitbarek
December 2	Cairo, Egypt; Clay; M15; Singles and Doubles Draws	(Spain) Pol Martín Tiffon; 6–2, 6–1	(Argentina) Fermín Tenti	(Ukraine) Oleg Prihodko (Argentina) Facundo Juárez	(Italy) Fabrizio Ornago (Italy) Simone Roncalli (Poland) Daniel Michalski (Italy) Marco Miceli
December 2	Cairo, Egypt; Clay; M15; Singles and Doubles Draws	(Lithuania) Laurynas Grigelis (Spain) David Pérez Sanz; 6–1, 3–6, [10–7]	(Argentina) Ignacio Monzón (Argentina) Fermín Tenti	(Ukraine) Oleg Prihodko (Argentina) Facundo Juárez	(Italy) Fabrizio Ornago (Italy) Simone Roncalli (Poland) Daniel Michalski (Italy) Marco Miceli
December 2	Heraklion, Greece; Hard; M15; Singles and Doubles Draws	(Russia) Boris Pokotilov; 6–7^{(4–7)}, 6–2, 7–6^{(8–6)}	(Russia) Alibek Kachmazov	(Republic of Ireland) Simon Carr (Israel) Yshai Oliel	(United Kingdom) Stuart Parker (Argentina) Matías Zukas (Bulgaria) Alexandar Lazarov (Austria) David Pichler
December 2	Heraklion, Greece; Hard; M15; Singles and Doubles Draws	(Republic of Ireland) Simon Carr (Netherlands) Ryan Nijboer; 7–6^{(8–6)}, 6–3	(Spain) Pablo Vivero González (Argentina) Matías Zukas	(Republic of Ireland) Simon Carr (Israel) Yshai Oliel	(United Kingdom) Stuart Parker (Argentina) Matías Zukas (Bulgaria) Alexandar Lazarov (Austria) David Pichler
December 2	Cancún, Mexico; Hard; M15; Singles and Doubles Draws	(United States) Nick Chappell; 6–3, 6–3	(Peru) Jorge Panta	(United States) Gage Brymer (Japan) Shintaro Mochizuki	(India) Siddhant Banthia (United States) Joshua Ortlip (Canada) David Volfson (Mexico) Alex Hernández
December 2	Cancún, Mexico; Hard; M15; Singles and Doubles Draws	(Brazil) Eduardo Ribeiro (Brazil) Fernando Yamacita; 6–4, 6–4	(Mexico) Mauricio Astorga (Mexico) Alex Hernández	(United States) Gage Brymer (Japan) Shintaro Mochizuki	(India) Siddhant Banthia (United States) Joshua Ortlip (Canada) David Volfson (Mexico) Alex Hernández
December 2	Nonthaburi, Thailand; Hard; M15; Singles and Doubles Draws	(Ukraine) Danylo Kalenichenko; 6–4, 6–4	(Japan) Makoto Ochi	(Bulgaria) Dimitar Kuzmanov (Czech Republic) Dominik Palán	(Chinese Taipei) Ray Ho (France) Benjamin Pietri (India) Rishab Agarwal (Australia) Alexander Crnokrak
December 2	Nonthaburi, Thailand; Hard; M15; Singles and Doubles Draws	(South Korea) Chung Hong (South Korea) Lee Jea-moon; 6–3, 5–7, [10–6]	(India) S D Prajwal Dev (India) Adil Kalyanpur	(Bulgaria) Dimitar Kuzmanov (Czech Republic) Dominik Palán	(Chinese Taipei) Ray Ho (France) Benjamin Pietri (India) Rishab Agarwal (Australia) Alexander Crnokrak
December 2	Monastir, Tunisia; Hard; M15; Singles and Doubles Draws	(France) Calvin Hemery; 7–6^{(7–4)}, 6–4	(France) Arthur Rinderknech	(Russia) Evgenii Tiurnev (Czech Republic) Dalibor Svrčina	(France) Quentin Robert (Spain) Nicolás Álvarez Varona (Czech Republic) Petr Michnev (Turkey) Ergi Kırkın
December 2	Monastir, Tunisia; Hard; M15; Singles and Doubles Draws	(Czech Republic) Petr Michnev (Czech Republic) Dalibor Svrčina; 6–1, 7–5	(Russia) Timur Kiyamov (Russia) Evgenii Tiurnev	(Russia) Evgenii Tiurnev (Czech Republic) Dalibor Svrčina	(France) Quentin Robert (Spain) Nicolás Álvarez Varona (Czech Republic) Petr Michnev (Turkey) Ergi Kırkın
December 2	Antalya, Turkey; Clay; M15; Singles and Doubles Draws	(Hungary) Fábián Marozsán; 7–5, 6–4	(Russia) Ronald Slobodchikov	(Russia) Pavel Kotov (Netherlands) Bart Stevens	(Hungary) Máté Valkusz (Czech Republic) Pavel Nejedlý (Germany) Marvin Netuschil (Germany) Luca Gelhardt
December 2	Antalya, Turkey; Clay; M15; Singles and Doubles Draws	(Hungary) Fábián Marozsán (Hungary) Máté Valkusz; 6–3, 7–5	(Spain) David Jordà Sanchis (Germany) Niklas Schell	(Russia) Pavel Kotov (Netherlands) Bart Stevens	(Hungary) Máté Valkusz (Czech Republic) Pavel Nejedlý (Germany) Marvin Netuschil (Germany) Luca Gelhardt
December 2	Tallahassee, United States; Hard (indoor); M15; Singles and Doubles Draws	(United Kingdom) Anton Matusevich; 3–6, 6–1, 7–5	(Burundi) Guy Orly Iradukunda	(United States) Strong Kirchheimer (Canada) Alexis Galarneau	(United States) Michael Shabaz (United Kingdom) Jack Findel-Hawkins (United Kingdom) David Fox (United States) Dennis Novikov
December 2	Tallahassee, United States; Hard (indoor); M15; Singles and Doubles Draws	(United States) Strong Kirchheimer (United States) Dennis Novikov; 7–5, 6–3	(United Kingdom) Jack Findel-Hawkins (United Kingdom) Ryan Peniston	(United States) Strong Kirchheimer (Canada) Alexis Galarneau	(United States) Michael Shabaz (United Kingdom) Jack Findel-Hawkins (United Kingdom) David Fox (United States) Dennis Novikov
December 9	Santo Domingo, Dominican Republic; Hard; M15; Singles and Doubles Draws	(Dominican Republic) Peter Bertran; 4–6, 6–1, 6–4	(Dominican Republic) Nick Hardt	(Chile) Michel Vernier (Peru) Arklon Huertas del Pino	(United States) A.J. Catanzariti (United States) Alfredo Perez (United States) Matthew Mendez (Venezuela) Ricardo Rodríguez
December 9	Santo Domingo, Dominican Republic; Hard; M15; Singles and Doubles Draws	(Dominican Republic) Nick Hardt (United States) Maksim Tikhomirov; 6–2, 6–3	(Brazil) Alex Blumenberg (Brazil) João Hinsching	(Chile) Michel Vernier (Peru) Arklon Huertas del Pino	(United States) A.J. Catanzariti (United States) Alfredo Perez (United States) Matthew Mendez (Venezuela) Ricardo Rodríguez
December 9	Cairo, Egypt; Clay; M15; Singles and Doubles Draws	(France) Manuel Guinard; 6–3, 6–2	(Lithuania) Laurynas Grigelis	(Netherlands) Niels Lootsma (Argentina) Facundo Juárez	(Italy) Alexander Weis (Spain) Àlex Martí Pujolràs (Brazil) Jordan Correia (Argentina) Fermín Tenti
December 9	Cairo, Egypt; Clay; M15; Singles and Doubles Draws	(Lithuania) Laurynas Grigelis (France) Manuel Guinard; 7–6^{(9–7)}, 6–3	(Argentina) Facundo Juárez (Argentina) Octavio Volpi	(Netherlands) Niels Lootsma (Argentina) Facundo Juárez	(Italy) Alexander Weis (Spain) Àlex Martí Pujolràs (Brazil) Jordan Correia (Argentina) Fermín Tenti
December 9	Heraklion, Greece; Hard; M15; Singles and Doubles Draws	(Austria) David Pichler; 6–1, 0–0, ret.	(Ukraine) Vitaliy Sachko	(Spain) Pablo Vivero González (United States) Peter Kobelt	(Bulgaria) Alexander Donski (Ukraine) Artem Smirnov (South Korea) Park Ui-sung (Israel) Yshai Oliel
December 9	Heraklion, Greece; Hard; M15; Singles and Doubles Draws	(Greece) Aristotelis Thanos (Greece) Eleftherios Theodorou; Walkover	(Austria) David Pichler (Ukraine) Vitaliy Sachko	(Spain) Pablo Vivero González (United States) Peter Kobelt	(Bulgaria) Alexander Donski (Ukraine) Artem Smirnov (South Korea) Park Ui-sung (Israel) Yshai Oliel
December 9	Cancún, Mexico; Hard; M15; Singles and Doubles Draws	(United States) Vasil Kirkov; 6–7^{(3–7)}, 7–6^{(10–8)}, 7–6^{(7–1)}	(United States) Nick Chappell	(Japan) Shintaro Mochizuki (Peru) Jorge Panta	(United States) Reese Stalder (United States) Justin Butsch (United States) Joshua Ortlip (Argentina) Felipe Martínez Sarrasague
December 9	Cancún, Mexico; Hard; M15; Singles and Doubles Draws	(United States) Tanner Smith (United States) Reese Stalder; 6–7^{(3–7)}, 6–1, [11–9]	(Bolivia) Juan Carlos Aguilar (Peru) Jorge Panta	(Japan) Shintaro Mochizuki (Peru) Jorge Panta	(United States) Reese Stalder (United States) Justin Butsch (United States) Joshua Ortlip (Argentina) Felipe Martínez Sarrasague
December 9	Doha, Qatar; Hard; M15; Singles and Doubles Draws	(Bulgaria) Dimitar Kuzmanov; 6–0, 6–4	(Ukraine) Danylo Kalenichenko	(Croatia) Matija Pecotić (Belgium) Zizou Bergs	(Russia) Aslan Karatsev (Sweden) Jonathan Mridha (United Kingdom) Toby Martin (Sweden) Simon Freund
December 9	Doha, Qatar; Hard; M15; Singles and Doubles Draws	(Ukraine) Danylo Kalenichenko (Belarus) Ivan Liutarevich; 6–3, 7–6^{(7–3)}	(Morocco) Adam Moundir (Japan) Rio Noguchi	(Croatia) Matija Pecotić (Belgium) Zizou Bergs	(Russia) Aslan Karatsev (Sweden) Jonathan Mridha (United Kingdom) Toby Martin (Sweden) Simon Freund
December 9	Monastir, Tunisia; Hard; M15; Singles and Doubles Draws	(Tunisia) Skander Mansouri; 6–2, 6–0	(Turkey) Ergi Kırkın	(France) Thomas Laurent (Romania) Ștefan Paloși	(Russia) Yan Bondarevskiy (Estonia) Kristjan Tamm (Italy) Erik Crepaldi (France) Sadio Doumbia
December 9	Monastir, Tunisia; Hard; M15; Singles and Doubles Draws	(France) Florian Lakat (Tunisia) Skander Mansouri; 7–6^{(8–6)}, 6–4	(Russia) Yan Bondarevskiy (Tunisia) Anis Ghorbel	(France) Thomas Laurent (Romania) Ștefan Paloși	(Russia) Yan Bondarevskiy (Estonia) Kristjan Tamm (Italy) Erik Crepaldi (France) Sadio Doumbia
December 9	Antalya, Turkey; Clay; M15; Singles and Doubles Draws	(Spain) Álvaro López San Martín; 4–6, 6–2, 6–4	(Hungary) Máté Valkusz	(Hungary) Fábián Marozsán (Serbia) Miljan Zekić	(Czech Republic) Patrik Rikl (Romania) Alexandru Jecan (Argentina) Alejo Lorenzo Lingua Lavallén (Russia) Ronald Slobodchikov
December 9	Antalya, Turkey; Clay; M15; Singles and Doubles Draws	(Italy) Marco Bortolotti (Romania) Alexandru Jecan; 7–6^{(7–5)}, 6–7^{(4–7)}, [10–7]	(Sweden) Linus Frost (Sweden) Gustav Hansson	(Hungary) Fábián Marozsán (Serbia) Miljan Zekić	(Czech Republic) Patrik Rikl (Romania) Alexandru Jecan (Argentina) Alejo Lorenzo Lingua Lavallén (Russia) Ronald Slobodchikov
December 16	Doha, Qatar; Hard; M15; Singles and Doubles Draws	(Russia) Aslan Karatsev; 3–6, 6–2, 6–2	(Georgia (country)) Aleksandre Bakshi	(Belgium) Zizou Bergs (Sweden) Karl Friberg	(France) Alexis Gautier (Sweden) Jonathan Mridha (United Kingdom) Harry Wendelken (Japan) Rio Noguchi
December 16	Doha, Qatar; Hard; M15; Singles and Doubles Draws	(Sweden) Simon Freund (Sweden) Jonathan Mridha; 6–1, 6–0	(Belgium) Zizou Bergs (Georgia (country)) Zura Tkemaladze	(Belgium) Zizou Bergs (Sweden) Karl Friberg	(France) Alexis Gautier (Sweden) Jonathan Mridha (United Kingdom) Harry Wendelken (Japan) Rio Noguchi
December 16	Monastir, Tunisia; Hard; M15; Singles and Doubles Draws	(France) Arthur Rinderknech; 6–3, 4–6, 6–3	(France) Thomas Laurent	(France) Baptiste Crepatte (Tunisia) Skander Mansouri	(France) Gabriel Petit (France) Sadio Doumbia (United States) Nicolas Moreno de Alboran (Italy) Lorenzo Bocchi
December 16	Monastir, Tunisia; Hard; M15; Singles and Doubles Draws	(France) Geoffrey Blancaneaux (Tunisia) Skander Mansouri; 6–0, 7–6^{(7–1)}	(France) Baptiste Crepatte (France) Gabriel Petit	(France) Baptiste Crepatte (Tunisia) Skander Mansouri	(France) Gabriel Petit (France) Sadio Doumbia (United States) Nicolas Moreno de Alboran (Italy) Lorenzo Bocchi
December 16	Antalya, Turkey; Clay; M15; Singles and Doubles Draws	(Romania) Alexandru Jecan; 6–3, 6–3	(Serbia) Marko Miladinović	(Sweden) Gustav Hansson (Russia) Ivan Nedelko	(France) Manuel Guinard (Russia) Andrey Chepelev (Belgium) Benjamin D'Hoe (Spain) Álvaro López San Martín
December 16	Antalya, Turkey; Clay; M15; Singles and Doubles Draws	(Italy) Marco Bortolotti (Romania) Alexandru Jecan; 7–5, 6–4	(France) Luka Pavlovic (Italy) Augusto Virgili	(Sweden) Gustav Hansson (Russia) Ivan Nedelko	(France) Manuel Guinard (Russia) Andrey Chepelev (Belgium) Benjamin D'Hoe (Spain) Álvaro López San Martín
December 30	Te Anau, New Zealand; Hard; M15; Singles and Doubles Draws	(Australia) Luke Saville; 6–3, 6–1	(Italy) Andrea Vavassori	(France) Stéphane Robert (Japan) Shuichi Sekiguchi	(New Zealand) Kiranpal Pannu (New Zealand) Ajeet Rai (Australia) Jesse Delaney (New Zealand) George Stoupe
December 30	Te Anau, New Zealand; Hard; M15; Singles and Doubles Draws	(Switzerland) Luca Margaroli (Italy) Andrea Vavassori; 7–5, 6–7^{(2–7)}, [10–8]	(New Zealand) Rhett Purcell (Australia) Calum Puttergill	(France) Stéphane Robert (Japan) Shuichi Sekiguchi	(New Zealand) Kiranpal Pannu (New Zealand) Ajeet Rai (Australia) Jesse Delaney (New Zealand) George Stoupe
