= 2020 European Open =

Men's tennis tournament in October 2020

- Date: 19–25 October
- Edition: 5th
- Category: ATP Tour 250 Series
- Draw: 28S / 16D
- Prize money: €394,800
- Surface: Hard / indoor
- Location: Antwerp, Belgium

Champions

Singles
- (France) Ugo Humbert

Doubles
- (Australia) John Peers / (New Zealand) Michael Venus
- European Open

The 2020 European Open was a men's tennis tournament played on indoor hard courts. It was the fifth edition of the European Open and part of the ATP Tour 250 series of the 2020 ATP Tour. It took place at the Lotto Arena in Antwerp, Belgium, from October 19 to October 25.

== Singles main-draw entrants ==
=== Seeds ===
Country	Player	Rank^{1}	Seed
BEL	David Goffin	14	1
ESP	Pablo Carreño Busta	15	2
RUS	Karen Khachanov	17	3
BUL	Grigor Dimitrov	19	4
CAN	Milos Raonic	21	5
SRB	Dušan Lajović	24	6
USA	Taylor Fritz	28	7
AUS	Alex De Minaur	29	8

- Rankings are as of 12 October 2020.

=== Other entrants ===
The following players received wildcards into the singles main draw:

- (Belgium) Zizou Bergs
- (Belgium) Kimmer Coppejans
- (Italy) Luca Nardi

The following players received entry from the qualifying draw:

- (Italy) Salvatore Caruso
- (United States) Marcos Giron
- (South Africa) Lloyd Harris
- (Finland) Emil Ruusuvuori

The following player received entry as a lucky loser:

- (Argentina) Federico Coria

=== Withdrawals ===
- (Georgia (country)) Nikoloz Basilashvili → replaced by (France) Richard Gasquet
- (Italy) Matteo Berrettini → replaced by (Slovenia) Aljaž Bedene
- (Japan) Kei Nishikori → replaced by (Argentina) Federico Coria
- (Italy) Fabio Fognini → replaced by (Spain) Feliciano López
- (Chile) Cristian Garín → replaced by (Spain) Pablo Andújar
- (Russia) Andrey Rublev → replaced by (United States) Frances Tiafoe
- (Norway) Casper Ruud → replaced by (United States) Tommy Paul

== Doubles main-draw entrants ==
=== Seeds ===
Country	Player	Country	Player	Rank^{1}	Seed
~~COL~~	~~Juan Sebastián Cabal~~	~~COL~~	~~Robert Farah~~	~~3~~	~~1~~
AUS	John Peers	NZL	Michael Venus	38	2
FRA	Fabrice Martin	NED	Jean-Julien Rojer	46	3
GBR	Jamie Murray	GBR	Neal Skupski	51	4
BEL	Sander Gillé	BEL	Joran Vliegen	78	5

- Rankings are as of 12 October 2020

=== Other entrants ===
The following pairs received wildcards into the doubles main draw:

- (Belgium) Michael Geerts / (Belgium) Yannick Mertens
- (United States) Zane Khan / (Italy) Luca Nardi

The following pairs received entry as an alternates:

- (Australia) Alex de Minaur / (Australia) Matt Reid
- (Spain) Pablo Andújar / (Netherlands) Sander Arends

=== Withdrawals ===
Before the tournament

- (Colombia) Juan Sebastián Cabal
- (Japan) Kei Nishikori

== Finals ==
=== Singles ===
- (France) Ugo Humbert def. (Australia) Alex de Minaur, 6–1, 7–6^{(7–4)}

=== Doubles ===
- (Australia) John Peers / (New Zealand) Michael Venus def. (India) Rohan Bopanna / (Netherlands) Matwé Middelkoop, 6–3, 6–4
