= 2021 US Open – Men's singles qualifying =

Men's singles qualifying
- 2021 US Open

Events
Singles	men	women		boys	girls
Doubles	men	women	mixed	boys	girls
WC Singles	men	women	quad
WC Doubles	men	women	quad
Legends	men	women	mixed

Qualification
Singles	men	women
← 2019 ·	US Open	· 2022 →

The 2021 US Open – Men's Singles Qualifying was a series of tennis matches from 24 August 2021 to 27 August 2021 where 128 players compete to determine the 16 qualifiers into the main draw of the 2021 US Open men's singles tournament, and, if necessary, the lucky losers. Due to pandemic-related restrictions, the qualifying matches were not open to the public.

== Seeds ==
1. (France) Benjamin Bonzi (second round)
2. (Argentina) Francisco Cerúndolo (qualifying competition)
3. (Colombia) Daniel Elahi Galán (first round)
4. (Poland) Kamil Majchrzak (qualified)
5. (Spain) Bernabé Zapata Miralles (qualifying competition, lucky loser)
6. (Netherlands) Botic van de Zandschulp (qualified)
7. (Bosnia and Herzegovina) Damir Džumhur (second round)
8. (Japan) Yasutaka Uchiyama (first round)
9. (Peru) Juan Pablo Varillas (first round)
10. (Australia) Christopher O'Connell (second round)
11. (France) Hugo Gaston (second round)
12. (Portugal) Pedro Sousa (first round)
13. (Kazakhstan) Mikhail Kukushkin (qualifying competition, lucky loser)
14. (Switzerland) Henri Laaksonen (qualified)
15. (Japan) Yūichi Sugita (qualifying competition, lucky loser)
16. (Spain) Fernando Verdasco (second round)
17. (Bolivia) Hugo Dellien (second round)
18. (Slovakia) Alex Molčan (qualified)
19. (Austria) Jurij Rodionov (qualifying competition)
20. (Germany) Peter Gojowczyk (qualified)
21. (Argentina) Tomás Martín Etcheverry (first round)
22. (Czech Republic) Tomáš Macháč (first round)
23. (Germany) Oscar Otte (qualified)
24. (Denmark) Holger Rune (qualified)
25. (United Kingdom) Liam Broady (second round)
26. (Australia) Marc Polmans (first round)
27. (Portugal) João Sousa (first round)
28. (France) Antoine Hoang (qualified)
29. (United States) Maxime Cressy (qualified)
30. (Russia) Evgeny Donskoy (qualified)
31. (Argentina) Juan Ignacio Londero (first round)
32. (Ukraine) Illya Marchenko (second round)

== Qualifiers ==
1. (Argentina) Marco Trungelliti
2. (Germany) Peter Gojowczyk
3. (United States) Christopher Eubanks
4. (Poland) Kamil Majchrzak
5. (Germany) Oscar Otte
6. (Netherlands) Botic van de Zandschulp
7. (Russia) Evgeny Donskoy
8. (France) Quentin Halys
9. (Germany) Maximilian Marterer
10. (Denmark) Holger Rune
11. (United States) Maxime Cressy
12. (Slovakia) Alex Molčan
13. (France) Antoine Hoang
14. (Switzerland) Henri Laaksonen
15. (Croatia) Ivo Karlović
16. (Turkey) Cem İlkel

== Lucky losers ==
1. (Spain) Bernabé Zapata Miralles
2. (Kazakhstan) Mikhail Kukushkin
3. (Japan) Yūichi Sugita

== Qualifying draw ==
=== First qualifier ===
First round
1	(France) Benjamin Bonzi	6	6
(Germany) Daniel Masur	0	2
(Italy) Lorenzo Giustino	6	6^{2}	1
WC	(United States) Aleksandar Kovacevic	3	7^{7}	6
(Argentina) Marco Trungelliti	6	2
(Slovenia) Blaž Kavčič	1	0^{r}
(Japan) Tatsuma Ito	4	1
25	(United Kingdom) Liam Broady	6	6

Second round
1	(France) Benjamin Bonzi	3	4
WC	(United States) Aleksandar Kovacevic	6	6
(Argentina) Marco Trungelliti	6	6
25	(United Kingdom) Liam Broady	4	4

Qualifying competition
WC	(United States) Aleksandar Kovacevic	6	6^{6}	5
(Argentina) Marco Trungelliti	3	7^{8}	7

=== Second qualifier ===
First round
2	(Argentina) Francisco Cerúndolo	6	6^{5}	6
(United States) Thai-Son Kwiatkowski	0	7^{7}	4
(India) Sumit Nagal	5	6	3
PR	(Argentina) Juan Pablo Ficovich	7	4	6
(Croatia) Borna Gojo	7^{7}	5	1
(Netherlands) Robin Haase	6^{5}	7	6
(Czech Republic) Lukáš Rosol	6	6^{4}	5
20	(Germany) Peter Gojowczyk	4	7^{7}	7

Second round
2	(Argentina) Francisco Cerúndolo	7^{7}	4	6
PR	(Argentina) Juan Pablo Ficovich	6^{2}	6	4
(Netherlands) Robin Haase	4	4
20	(Germany) Peter Gojowczyk	6	6

Qualifying competition
2	(Argentina) Francisco Cerúndolo	4	3
20	(Germany) Peter Gojowczyk	6	6

=== Third qualifier ===
First round
3	(Colombia) Daniel Elahi Galán	3	2
(United States) Christopher Eubanks	6	6
(Canada) Brayden Schnur	4	6^{5}
(India) Prajnesh Gunneswaran	6	7^{7}
WC	(United States) Govind Nanda	3	5
(Argentina) Sebastián Báez	6	7
WC	(United States) Christian Harrison	6	6
31	(Argentina) Juan Ignacio Londero	4	2

Second round
(United States) Christopher Eubanks	6	6
(India) Prajnesh Gunneswaran	3	4
(Argentina) Sebastián Báez	7^{7}	7
WC	(United States) Christian Harrison	6^{4}	5

Qualifying competition
(United States) Christopher Eubanks	2	7	7^{8}
(Argentina) Sebastián Báez	6	5	6^{6}

=== Fourth qualifier ===
First round
4	(Poland) Kamil Majchrzak	6	6
(Portugal) Frederico Ferreira Silva	1	4
(United States) J. J. Wolf	7	6
(Uzbekistan) Denis Istomin	5	2
(Australia) Matthew Ebden	4	6	1
(Italy) Federico Gaio	6	3	6
(Serbia) Danilo Petrović	4	3
19	(Austria) Jurij Rodionov	6	6

Second round
4	(Poland) Kamil Majchrzak	6	7^{7}
(United States) J. J. Wolf	3	6^{5}
(Italy) Federico Gaio	4	4
19	(Austria) Jurij Rodionov	6	6

Qualifying competition
4	(Poland) Kamil Majchrzak	6	6
19	(Austria) Jurij Rodionov	1	2

=== Fifth qualifier ===
First round
5	(Spain) Bernabé Zapata Miralles	7	1	6
WC	(United States) Stefan Kozlov	5	6	3
(Italy) Roberto Marcora	7^{7}	6
(Dominican Republic) Roberto Cid Subervi	6^{2}	3
(France) Constant Lestienne	7	4	6
(Italy) Andrea Pellegrino	5	6	0
(Argentina) Renzo Olivo	7^{7}	0	6^{4}
23	(Germany) Oscar Otte	6^{3}	6	7^{7}

Second round
5	(Spain) Bernabé Zapata Miralles	7	3	7^{9}
(Italy) Roberto Marcora	5	6	6^{7}
(France) Constant Lestienne	3	6	6^{6}
23	(Germany) Oscar Otte	6	3	7^{8}

Qualifying competition
5	(Spain) Bernabé Zapata Miralles	4	6	3
23	(Germany) Oscar Otte	6	3	6

=== Sixth qualifier ===
First round
6	(Netherlands) Botic van de Zandschulp	6^{1}	6	6
(Chile) Tomás Barrios Vera	7^{7}	2	2
WC	(United States) Ben Shelton	7^{7}	7^{7}
(United States) Michael Mmoh	6^{3}	6^{5}
(Ecuador) Emilio Gómez	7	6
(Switzerland) Marc-Andrea Hüsler	5	3
(France) Enzo Couacaud	7	6
21	(Argentina) Tomás Martín Etcheverry	5	3

Second round
6	(Netherlands) Botic van de Zandschulp	3	7	6
WC	(United States) Ben Shelton	6	5	4
(Ecuador) Emilio Gómez	6^{5}	4
(France) Enzo Couacaud	7^{7}	6

Qualifying competition
6	(Netherlands) Botic van de Zandschulp	3	7^{7}	6
(France) Enzo Couacaud	6	6^{5}	2

=== Seventh qualifier ===
First round
7	(Bosnia and Herzegovina) Damir Džumhur	4	7^{7}	6
(Canada) Peter Polansky	6	6^{4}	0
WC	(United States) Zane Khan	4	7	6
(Ukraine) Sergiy Stakhovsky	6	5	3
(Bulgaria) Dimitar Kuzmanov	6^{2}	4
(Romania) Marius Copil	7^{7}	6
(India) Ramkumar Ramanathan	6	6^{1}	4
30	(Russia) Evgeny Donskoy	4	7^{7}	6

Second round
7	(Bosnia and Herzegovina) Damir Džumhur	2	6^{5}
WC	(United States) Zane Khan	6	7^{7}
(Romania) Marius Copil	6^{6}	4
30	(Russia) Evgeny Donskoy	7^{8}	6

Qualifying competition
WC	(United States) Zane Khan	4	7	6^{4}
30	(Russia) Evgeny Donskoy	6	5	7^{7}

=== Eighth qualifier ===
First round
8	(Japan) Yasutaka Uchiyama	5	6^{7}
(Poland) Kacper Żuk	7	7^{9}
(France) Quentin Halys	6	6
WC	(United States) Samir Banerjee	1	0
(Slovakia) Filip Horanský	7^{7}	7^{11}
(Denmark) Mikael Torpegaard	6^{4}	6^{9}
(Latvia) Ernests Gulbis	6	6
26	(Australia) Marc Polmans	3	4

Second round
(Poland) Kacper Żuk	6^{6}	4
(France) Quentin Halys	7^{8}	6
(Slovakia) Filip Horanský	4	5
(Latvia) Ernests Gulbis	6	7

Qualifying competition
(France) Quentin Halys	6	7
(Latvia) Ernests Gulbis	4	5

=== Ninth qualifier ===
First round
9	(Peru) Juan Pablo Varillas	6	1	6^{5}
(Belgium) Zizou Bergs	2	6	7^{7}
(Germany) Maximilian Marterer	4	7	6
(Argentina) Andrea Collarini	6	5	2
(Sweden) Elias Ymer	1	3
(France) Maxime Janvier	6	6
(Italy) Paolo Lorenzi	7^{7}	1	7
27	(Portugal) João Sousa	6^{5}	6	5

Second round
(Belgium) Zizou Bergs	4	4
(Germany) Maximilian Marterer	6	6
(France) Maxime Janvier	6	6
(Italy) Paolo Lorenzi	4	3

Qualifying competition
(Germany) Maximilian Marterer	7^{7}	6^{7}	6
(France) Maxime Janvier	6^{4}	7^{9}	4

=== Tenth qualifier ===
First round
10	(Australia) Christopher O'Connell	6	6
(Turkey) Altuğ Çelikbilek	2	4
(Germany) Mats Moraing	6	4	7^{7}
(Brazil) Felipe Meligeni Alves	3	6	6^{2}
(United States) Mitchell Krueger	6	6
(Canada) Steven Diez	3	1
(Slovakia) Lukáš Lacko	4	4
24	(Denmark) Holger Rune	6	6

Second round
10	(Australia) Christopher O'Connell	6^{3}	1
(Germany) Mats Moraing	7^{7}	6
(United States) Mitchell Krueger	4	1
24	(Denmark) Holger Rune	6	6

Qualifying competition
(Germany) Mats Moraing	4	6	3
24	(Denmark) Holger Rune	6	3	6

=== Eleventh qualifier ===
First round
11	(France) Hugo Gaston	6	6
(Czech Republic) Vít Kopřiva	4	2
(Belgium) Ruben Bemelmans	7	7^{7}
Alt	(Netherlands) Jesper de Jong	5	6^{5}
(Brazil) João Menezes	6	7^{7}
PR	(Italy) Filippo Baldi	4	6^{4}
(Argentina) Guido Andreozzi	4	7	5
29	(United States) Maxime Cressy	6	5	7

Second round
11	(France) Hugo Gaston	1	1
(Belgium) Ruben Bemelmans	6	6
(Brazil) João Menezes	5	3
29	(United States) Maxime Cressy	7	6

Qualifying competition
(Belgium) Ruben Bemelmans	6	2	5
29	(United States) Maxime Cressy	4	6	7

=== Twelfth qualifier ===
First round
12	(Portugal) Pedro Sousa	4	4
(United States) Ulises Blanch	6	6
(Portugal) Gastão Elias	3	6	6
(France) Hugo Grenier	6	3	4
(Portugal) João Domingues	2	3
(Czech Republic) Zdeněk Kolář	6	6
(Belgium) Kimmer Coppejans	3	3
18	(Slovakia) Alex Molčan	6	6

Second round
(United States) Ulises Blanch	4	3
(Portugal) Gastão Elias	6	6
(Czech Republic) Zdeněk Kolář	4	3
18	(Slovakia) Alex Molčan	6	6

Qualifying competition
(Portugal) Gastão Elias	2	6	6^{6}
18	(Slovakia) Alex Molčan	6	4	7^{8}

=== Thirteenth qualifier ===
First round
13	(Kazakhstan) Mikhail Kukushkin	4	6	7^{7}
(France) Mathias Bourgue	6	3	6^{2}
(Austria) Sebastian Ofner	5	4
(Chinese Taipei) Jason Jung	7	6
(Japan) Go Soeda	1	6	6
(Germany) Yannick Maden	6	4	4
WC	(United States) Nicolas Moreno de Alboran	3	5
28	(France) Antoine Hoang	6	7

Second round
13	(Kazakhstan) Mikhail Kukushkin	6	6
(Chinese Taipei) Jason Jung	4	3
(Japan) Go Soeda	6^{7}	5
28	(France) Antoine Hoang	7^{9}	7

Qualifying competition
13	(Kazakhstan) Mikhail Kukushkin	6	6^{6}	5
28	(France) Antoine Hoang	0	7^{8}	7

=== Fourteenth qualifier ===
First round
14	(Switzerland) Henri Laaksonen	6	6
(Italy) Thomas Fabbiano	2	3
(Chile) Alejandro Tabilo	7	6^{0}	3
WC	(United States) Eliot Spizzirri	5	7^{7}	6
(Kazakhstan) Dmitry Popko	2	5
(Slovenia) Blaž Rola	6	7
(Italy) Gian Marco Moroni	7	6
22	(Czech Republic) Tomáš Macháč	5	4

Second round
14	(Switzerland) Henri Laaksonen	3	7^{8}	6
WC	(United States) Eliot Spizzirri	6	6^{6}	4
(Slovenia) Blaž Rola	6	6
(Italy) Gian Marco Moroni	4	2

Qualifying competition
14	(Switzerland) Henri Laaksonen	3	7^{7}	6
(Slovenia) Blaž Rola	6	6^{2}	4

=== Fifteenth qualifier ===
First round
15	(Japan) Yūichi Sugita	3	6	6
(Spain) Mario Vilella Martínez	6	3	2
(Australia) Thanasi Kokkinakis	7	6
(United States) Bjorn Fratangelo	5	3
(Croatia) Ivo Karlović	6	7^{7}
(Serbia) Nikola Milojević	4	6^{1}
(Italy) Alessandro Giannessi	1	3
17	(Bolivia) Hugo Dellien	6	6

Second round
15	(Japan) Yūichi Sugita	7^{7}	4	7^{7}
(Australia) Thanasi Kokkinakis	6^{4}	6	6^{4}
(Croatia) Ivo Karlović	7	6^{1}	6
17	(Bolivia) Hugo Dellien	5	7^{7}	2

Qualifying competition
15	(Japan) Yūichi Sugita	3	6^{5}
(Croatia) Ivo Karlović	6	7^{7}

=== Sixteenth qualifier ===
First round
16	(Spain) Fernando Verdasco	6^{5}	6	6
(Argentina) Facundo Mena	7^{7}	3	4
(Germany) Cedrik-Marcel Stebe	6^{5}	1
(Turkey) Cem İlkel	7^{7}	6
(France) Alexandre Müller	1	4
(Czech Republic) Jiří Lehečka	6	6
(Germany) Tobias Kamke	6	6^{2}	2
32	(Ukraine) Illya Marchenko	3	7^{7}	6

Second round
16	(Spain) Fernando Verdasco	6	3	4
(Turkey) Cem İlkel	4	6	6
(Czech Republic) Jiří Lehečka	4	7^{12}	6
32	(Ukraine) Illya Marchenko	6	6^{10}	4

Qualifying competition
(Turkey) Cem İlkel	7^{7}	6
(Czech Republic) Jiří Lehečka	6^{2}	3

== See also ==
- 2021 US Open – Women's singles qualifying
