= Aristotelis Thanos =

Greek tennis player (born 2001)

- Country (sports): Greece
- Born: 7 April 2001 (age 25) Athens, Greece
- Height: 1.93 m (6 ft 4 in)
- Turned pro: 2019
- Plays: Right-handed (two-handed backhand)
- Prize money: US $61,960

Singles
- Career record: 4–2 (at ATP Tour level, Grand Slam level, and in Davis Cup)
- Career titles: 0
- Highest ranking: No. 433 (20 October 2025)
- Current ranking: No. 505 (15 June 2026)

Doubles
- Career record: 0–3 (at ATP Tour level, Grand Slam level, and in Davis Cup)
- Career titles: 0
- Highest ranking: No. 665 (4 April 2022)
- Last updated on: 18 June 2026.

Aristotelis Thanos (born 7 April 2001) is a Greek tennis player. Thanos has a career high ATP singles ranking of No. 433 achieved on 20 October 2025 and a career high ATP doubles ranking of No. 665 achieved on 4 April 2022.

Thanos made his ATP main draw debut at the 2022 ATP Cup as one of the five members of the Greek team. He also won an ITF title (M15 Kursumljiska Banja) on 11 August 2024.

== ITF Circuit finals ==
=== Singles: 5 (3 titles, 2 runner-ups) ===
Legend
$25,000 tournaments (2–1)
$15,000 tournaments (1–1)

| Result | W–L | Date | Tournament | Tier | Surface | Opponent | Score |
|---|---|---|---|---|---|---|---|
| Loss | 0–1 | Aug 2024 | ITF Kursumlijska Banja, Serbia | 15,000 | Clay | (Argentina) Juan Manuel La Serna | 2-6, 4–6 |
| Win | 1–1 | Aug 2024 | TF Kursumlijska Banja, Serbia | 15,000 | Clay | (Italy) Tommaso Compagnucci | 7-6, 6–2, |
| Loss | 1–2 | Nov 2024 | ITF Columbus, USA | 25,000 | Hard (Indoor) | (United States) Aidan Kim | 5-7, 1–6 |
| Win | 2–2 | Jun 2025 | ITF Varnamo, Sweden | 25,000 | Clay | (Sweden) Mikael Ymer | 6-4, 7–6 |
| Win | 3–2 | Aug 2025 | ITF Gentofte, Denmark | 25,000 | Clay | (Argentina) Hernan Casanova | 4-6, 6–4, 6–3 |

=== Doubles: 6 (3 titles, 3 runner-ups) ===
Legend
$25,000 tournaments (1–0)
$15,000 tournaments (2–3)

| Result | W–L | Date | Tournament | Tier | Surface | Partner | Opponents | Score |
|---|---|---|---|---|---|---|---|---|
| Win | 1–0 | Dec 2019 | ITF Heraklion, Greece | 15,000 | Hard | (Greece) Eleftherios Theodorou | (Spain) Pablo Vivero Gonzalez (Argentina) Matias Zukas | 6-4, 2–6, 10–2 |
| Win | 2–0 | Sep 2020 | ITF Monastir, Tunisia | 15,000 | Hard | (Greece) Petros Tsitsipas | (Argentina) Thiago Agustin Tirante (Argentina) Matias Franco Descotte | 6-3, 6–4 |
| Loss | 2–1 | Aug 2021 | ITF Lodz, Poland | 15,000 | Clay | (Latvia) Karlis Ozolins | (Sweden) Filip Bergevi (Sweden) Markus Eriksson | 6-4, 2–6, 4–10 |
| Win | 3–1 | Mar 2022 | ITF Porec, Croatia | 25,000 | Clay | (Greece) Petros Tsitsipas | (Turkey) Ergi Kirkin (France) Titouan Droguet | 7-6, 4–6, 10–7 |
| Loss | 3–2 | Mar 2024 | ITF Heraklion, Greece | 15,000 | Hard | (Greece) Alexandros Skorilas | (Slovakia) Tomáš Lánik (Slovakia) Samuel Puskar | 6–7, 2–6 |
| Loss | 3–3 | Aug 2024 | ITF Kursumljiska Banja, Serbia | 15,000 | Clay | (Serbia) Vuk Radjenovic | (Russia) Pavel Verbin (Croatia) Admir Kalender | 4-6, 4–6 |
