= 2020 ITF Men's World Tennis Tour (July–September) =

The 2020 ITF Men's World Tennis Tour is the 2020 edition of the second tier tour for men's professional tennis. It is organised by the International Tennis Federation and is a tier below the ATP Tour. The ITF Men's World Tennis Tour includes tournaments with prize money ranging from $15,000 to $25,000.

The tour restarted on 17 August having been suspended since 13 March due to the COVID-19 pandemic.

== Key ==
M25 tournaments
M15 tournaments

== Month ==
=== July ===
No tournaments held due to the coronavirus pandemic

=== August ===
Week of	Tournament	Winner	Runners-up	Semifinalists	Quarterfinalists
August 3	Tournaments cancelled due to the coronavirus pandemic				
August 10	Tournaments cancelled due to the coronavirus pandemic				
August 17	Vogau, Austria; Clay; M25; Singles and Doubles Draws	(France) Manuel Guinard; 6–3, 6–3	(Bulgaria) Dimitar Kuzmanov	(Croatia) Nino Serdarušić (Denmark) Holger Rune	(Netherlands) Igor Sijsling (Netherlands) Jelle Sels (France) Mathias Bourgue (Austria) Lucas Miedler
August 17	Vogau, Austria; Clay; M25; Singles and Doubles Draws	(France) Manuel Guinard (Germany) Johannes Härteis; 6–4, 4–6, [11–9]	(Netherlands) Gijs Brouwer (Netherlands) Jelle Sels	(Croatia) Nino Serdarušić (Denmark) Holger Rune	(Netherlands) Igor Sijsling (Netherlands) Jelle Sels (France) Mathias Bourgue (Austria) Lucas Miedler
August 24	Poznań, Poland; Clay; M25; Singles and Doubles Draws	(Poland) Kacper Żuk; 7–6^{(8–6)}, 6–1	(Bulgaria) Dimitar Kuzmanov	(Netherlands) Tim van Rijthoven (Netherlands) Jelle Sels	(United Kingdom) Aidan McHugh (Czech Republic) Vít Kopřiva (France) Manuel Guinard (Croatia) Nino Serdarušić
August 24	Poznań, Poland; Clay; M25; Singles and Doubles Draws	(Poland) Jan Zieliński (Poland) Kacper Żuk; 7–5, 6–2	(Poland) Mikołaj Lorens (Poland) Wojciech Marek	(Netherlands) Tim van Rijthoven (Netherlands) Jelle Sels	(United Kingdom) Aidan McHugh (Czech Republic) Vít Kopřiva (France) Manuel Guinard (Croatia) Nino Serdarušić
August 24	Anif, Austria; Clay; M15; Singles and Doubles Draws	(Austria) Lucas Miedler; 6–1, 7–5	(Germany) Peter Heller	(Switzerland) Sandro Ehrat (Spain) Nikolás Sánchez Izquierdo	(Kazakhstan) Timofei Skatov (Russia) Alexander Shevchenko (France) Sadio Doumbia (Argentina) Matías Franco Descotte
August 24	Anif, Austria; Clay; M15; Singles and Doubles Draws	(Germany) Fabian Fallert (Germany) Peter Heller; 7–6^{(7–3)}, 5–7, [11–9]	(Austria) Lucas Miedler (Austria) Neil Oberleitner	(Switzerland) Sandro Ehrat (Spain) Nikolás Sánchez Izquierdo	(Kazakhstan) Timofei Skatov (Russia) Alexander Shevchenko (France) Sadio Doumbia (Argentina) Matías Franco Descotte
August 24	Alkmaar, Netherlands; Clay; M15; Singles and Doubles Draws	(Netherlands) Igor Sijsling; 6–2, 6–1	(Italy) Jacopo Berrettini	(Netherlands) Jesper de Jong (Belgium) Clément Geens	(Japan) Shintaro Mochizuki (Netherlands) Niels Visker (Germany) Benjamin Hassan (Argentina) Juan Pablo Paz
August 24	Alkmaar, Netherlands; Clay; M15; Singles and Doubles Draws	(Netherlands) Max Houkes (Netherlands) Sidané Pontjodikromo; 6–1, 5–7, [10–8]	(Netherlands) Mats Hermans (Netherlands) Sem Verbeek	(Netherlands) Jesper de Jong (Belgium) Clément Geens	(Japan) Shintaro Mochizuki (Netherlands) Niels Visker (Germany) Benjamin Hassan (Argentina) Juan Pablo Paz
August 31	Caslano, Switzerland; Clay; M15; Singles and Doubles Draws	(Switzerland) Sandro Ehrat; 6–4, 6–2	(Italy) Alessandro Bega	(Italy) Francesco Forti (France) Harold Mayot	(Switzerland) Rémy Bertola (Argentina) Juan Manuel Cerúndolo (Italy) Gianluigi Quinzi (Argentina) Tomás Martín Etcheverry
August 31	Caslano, Switzerland; Clay; M15; Singles and Doubles Draws	(Austria) Alexander Erler (Austria) David Pichler; 7–5, 6–4	(France) Antoine Cornut-Chauvinc (France) Harold Mayot	(Italy) Francesco Forti (France) Harold Mayot	(Switzerland) Rémy Bertola (Argentina) Juan Manuel Cerúndolo (Italy) Gianluigi Quinzi (Argentina) Tomás Martín Etcheverry
August 31	Novomoskovsk, Ukraine; Clay; M15; Singles and Doubles Draws	(Russia) Bogdan Bobrov; 6–3, 6–3	(Ukraine) Oleksii Krutykh	(Belarus) Yaraslav Shyla (Poland) Wojciech Marek	(Kazakhstan) Denis Yevseyev (Ukraine) Ivan Sergeyev (Russia) Ivan Gakhov (Ukraine) Eric Vanshelboim
August 31	Novomoskovsk, Ukraine; Clay; M15; Singles and Doubles Draws	(Ukraine) Vladyslav Orlov (Kazakhstan) Denis Yevseyev; 6–4, 5–7, [13–11]	(Poland) Wojciech Marek (Ukraine) Eric Vanshelboim	(Belarus) Yaraslav Shyla (Poland) Wojciech Marek	(Kazakhstan) Denis Yevseyev (Ukraine) Ivan Sergeyev (Russia) Ivan Gakhov (Ukraine) Eric Vanshelboim

=== September ===
Week of	Tournament	Winner	Runners-up	Semifinalists	Quarterfinalists
September 7	Sintra, Portugal; Hard; M15; Singles and Doubles Draws	(Portugal) Nuno Borges; 6–2, 6–2	(Portugal) Gastão Elias	(Spain) Nicolás Álvarez Varona (Monaco) Lucas Catarina	(Portugal) João Monteiro (Germany) Sebastian Fanselow (Brazil) Leonardo Civita-Telles (Tunisia) Aziz Dougaz
September 7	Sintra, Portugal; Hard; M15; Singles and Doubles Draws	(Germany) Fabian Fallert (United States) Nicolas Moreno de Alboran; 7–6^{(7–4)}, 6–4	(Russia) Savriyan Danilov (Dominican Republic) Nick Hardt	(Spain) Nicolás Álvarez Varona (Monaco) Lucas Catarina	(Portugal) João Monteiro (Germany) Sebastian Fanselow (Brazil) Leonardo Civita-Telles (Tunisia) Aziz Dougaz
September 7	Bucharest, Romania; Clay; M15; Singles and Doubles Draws	(Kazakhstan) Timofei Skatov; 6–4, 6–4	(Italy) Franco Agamenone	(France) Antoine Cornut-Chauvinc (Romania) Filip Cristian Jianu	(Romania) Dragoș Dima (Croatia) Duje Ajduković (France) Dan Added (France) Titouan Droguet
September 7	Bucharest, Romania; Clay; M15; Singles and Doubles Draws	(Romania) Adrian Barbu (Romania) Ștefan Paloși; 6–4, 6–2	(Poland) Michał Dembek (Ukraine) Georgii Kravchenko	(France) Antoine Cornut-Chauvinc (Romania) Filip Cristian Jianu	(Romania) Dragoș Dima (Croatia) Duje Ajduković (France) Dan Added (France) Titouan Droguet
September 14	Prague, Czech Republic; Clay; M25; Singles and Doubles Draws	(Czech Republic) Jiří Lehečka; 3–6, 6–3, 6–4	(Argentina) Sebastián Báez	(Sweden) Christian Lindell (Czech Republic) Jonáš Forejtek	(Serbia) Miljan Zekić (Austria) Lucas Miedler (Argentina) Pedro Cachin (Czech Republic) Robin Staněk
September 14	Prague, Czech Republic; Clay; M25; Singles and Doubles Draws	(Argentina) Sebastián Báez (Argentina) Pedro Cachin; 7–6^{(7–4)}, 6–1	(Austria) Lucas Miedler (Poland) Jan Zieliński	(Sweden) Christian Lindell (Czech Republic) Jonáš Forejtek	(Serbia) Miljan Zekić (Austria) Lucas Miedler (Argentina) Pedro Cachin (Czech Republic) Robin Staněk
September 14	Plaisir, France; Hard (indoor); M25+H; Singles and Doubles Draws	(Netherlands) Igor Sijsling; 7–6^{(7–5)}, 3–6, 7–6^{(7–4)}	(France) Johan Tatlot	(Israel) Daniel Cukierman (Belgium) Yannick Mertens	(France) Louis Dussin (United States) Roy Smith (Belgium) Michael Geerts (Brazil) Guilherme Clezar
September 14	Plaisir, France; Hard (indoor); M25+H; Singles and Doubles Draws	(Belgium) Michael Geerts (United States) Strong Kirchheimer; 6–2, 6–7^{(4–7)}, [10–4]	(Brazil) Guilherme Clezar (Brazil) Pedro Sakamoto	(Israel) Daniel Cukierman (Belgium) Yannick Mertens	(France) Louis Dussin (United States) Roy Smith (Belgium) Michael Geerts (Brazil) Guilherme Clezar
September 14	Klosters, Switzerland; Clay; M25; Singles and Doubles Draws	(Denmark) Holger Vitus Nødskov Rune; 6–4, 6–2	(Netherlands) Jesper de Jong	(Netherlands) Jelle Sels (Chile) Gonzalo Lama	(Switzerland) Leandro Riedi (France) Corentin Denolly (Switzerland) Rémy Bertola (Switzerland) Dominic Stricker
September 14	Klosters, Switzerland; Clay; M25; Singles and Doubles Draws	(Austria) Neil Oberleitner (Germany) Patrick Zahraj; 6–3, 6–7^{(5–7)}, [10–6]	(Switzerland) Jakub Paul (Switzerland) Damien Wenger	(Netherlands) Jelle Sels (Chile) Gonzalo Lama	(Switzerland) Leandro Riedi (France) Corentin Denolly (Switzerland) Rémy Bertola (Switzerland) Dominic Stricker
September 14	Sintra, Portugal; Hard; M15; Singles and Doubles Draws	(Spain) Carlos Gimeno Valero; 6–4, 3–6, 6–4	(Germany) Sebastian Fanselow	(United Kingdom) Ryan Peniston (Spain) Nicolás Álvarez Varona	(Belgium) Gauthier Onclin (Portugal) Gastão Elias (Portugal) Nuno Borges (United States) Emilio Nava
September 14	Sintra, Portugal; Hard; M15; Singles and Doubles Draws	(United States) Eduardo Nava (United States) Emilio Nava; 6–3, 6–4	(Germany) Sebastian Fanselow (Germany) Maik Steiner	(United Kingdom) Ryan Peniston (Spain) Nicolás Álvarez Varona	(Belgium) Gauthier Onclin (Portugal) Gastão Elias (Portugal) Nuno Borges (United States) Emilio Nava
September 14	Curtea de Argeș, Romania; Clay; M15; Singles and Doubles Draws	(Croatia) Duje Ajduković; 2–6, 6–4, 6–4	(Italy) Franco Agamenone	(Ukraine) Vitaliy Sachko (Spain) Àlex Martí Pujolràs	(Romania) Bogdan Pavel (Spain) Carlos López Montagud (Romania) Nicolae Frunză (Spain) Pol Toledo Bagué
September 14	Curtea de Argeș, Romania; Clay; M15; Singles and Doubles Draws	(Poland) Michał Dembek (Ukraine) Vitaliy Sachko; 6–4, 6–3	(Romania) Adrian Barbu (Romania) Ștefan Paloși	(Ukraine) Vitaliy Sachko (Spain) Àlex Martí Pujolràs	(Romania) Bogdan Pavel (Spain) Carlos López Montagud (Romania) Nicolae Frunză (Spain) Pol Toledo Bagué
September 14	Monastir, Tunisia; Hard; M15; Singles and Doubles Draws	(Russia) Alexander Shevchenko; 6–3, 6–4	(Austria) David Pichler	(Germany) Benedikt Henning (United States) Alexander Kotzen	(Republic of Ireland) Simon Carr (France) Gabriel Petit (France) Constantin Bittoun Kouzmine (Tunisia) Moez Echargui
September 14	Monastir, Tunisia; Hard; M15; Singles and Doubles Draws	(Austria) Alexander Erler (Austria) David Pichler; 6–4, 6–1	(Argentina) Ignacio Monzón (Argentina) Fermín Tenti	(Germany) Benedikt Henning (United States) Alexander Kotzen	(Republic of Ireland) Simon Carr (France) Gabriel Petit (France) Constantin Bittoun Kouzmine (Tunisia) Moez Echargui
September 21	Jablonec nad Nisou, Czech Republic; Clay; M25; Singles and Doubles Draws	(Argentina) Agustín Velotti; 6–2, 6–1	(Italy) Gianluigi Quinzi	(Belarus) Uladzimir Ignatik (Argentina) Sebastián Báez	(Uruguay) Martín Cuevas (Israel) Yshai Oliel (Czech Republic) Patrik Rikl (Argentina) Camilo Ugo Carabelli
September 21	Jablonec nad Nisou, Czech Republic; Clay; M25; Singles and Doubles Draws	(Belarus) Uladzimir Ignatik (Slovakia) Lukáš Klein; 6–3, 7–6^{(7–4)}	(Czech Republic) Filip Duda (Czech Republic) Petr Nouza	(Belarus) Uladzimir Ignatik (Argentina) Sebastián Báez	(Uruguay) Martín Cuevas (Israel) Yshai Oliel (Czech Republic) Patrik Rikl (Argentina) Camilo Ugo Carabelli
September 21	Castelo Branco, Portugal; Hard; M15; Singles and Doubles Draws	(Monaco) Lucas Catarina; 6–3, 2–6, 7–6^{(13–11)}	(United States) Strong Kirchheimer	(Italy) Riccardo Balzerani (Spain) Nicolás Álvarez Varona	(United States) Nicolas Moreno de Alboran (Brazil) João Lucas Reis da Silva (Portugal) Tiago Cação (United States) Emilio Nava
September 21	Castelo Branco, Portugal; Hard; M15; Singles and Doubles Draws	(Brazil) Mateus Alves (Brazil) Igor Marcondes; 7–6^{(7–4)}, 5–7, [10–8]	(United States) Eduardo Nava (United States) Emilio Nava	(Italy) Riccardo Balzerani (Spain) Nicolás Álvarez Varona	(United States) Nicolas Moreno de Alboran (Brazil) João Lucas Reis da Silva (Portugal) Tiago Cação (United States) Emilio Nava
September 21	Melilla, Spain; Clay; M15; Singles and Doubles Draws	(Kazakhstan) Timofei Skatov; 3–6, 6–0, 6–1	(Denmark) Holger Vitus Nødskov Rune	(Bulgaria) Adrian Andreev (Netherlands) Max Houkes	(Spain) José Francisco Vidal Azorín (Ukraine) Eric Vanshelboim (Spain) Imanol López Morillo (France) Valentin Royer
September 21	Melilla, Spain; Clay; M15; Singles and Doubles Draws	(France) Valentin Royer (Denmark) Holger Vitus Nødskov Rune; 7–5, 6–3	(Netherlands) Max Houkes (Spain) José Francisco Vidal Azorín	(Bulgaria) Adrian Andreev (Netherlands) Max Houkes	(Spain) José Francisco Vidal Azorín (Ukraine) Eric Vanshelboim (Spain) Imanol López Morillo (France) Valentin Royer
September 21	Monastir, Tunisia; Hard; M15; Singles and Doubles Draws	(Italy) Luca Potenza; 2–6, 6–4, 6–3	(Russia) Alexander Shevchenko	(United Kingdom) Stuart Parker (Austria) Alexander Erler	(France) Térence Atmane (Argentina) Matías Franco Descotte (France) Jean Thirouin (Slovenia) Tom Kočevar-Dešman
September 21	Monastir, Tunisia; Hard; M15; Singles and Doubles Draws	(Greece) Aristotelis Thanos (Greece) Petros Tsitsipas; 6–3, 6–4	(Argentina) Matías Franco Descotte (Argentina) Thiago Agustín Tirante	(United Kingdom) Stuart Parker (Austria) Alexander Erler	(France) Térence Atmane (Argentina) Matías Franco Descotte (France) Jean Thirouin (Slovenia) Tom Kočevar-Dešman
September 28	Pardubice, Czech Republic; Clay; M25; Singles and Doubles Draws	(Belarus) Uladzimir Ignatik; 6–3, 6–2	(Czech Republic) Jan Šátral	(Slovakia) Lukáš Klein (Argentina) Sebastián Báez	(Czech Republic) Jiří Lehečka (Czech Republic) Petr Nouza (Czech Republic) Vít Kopřiva (Argentina) Agustín Velotti
September 28	Pardubice, Czech Republic; Clay; M25; Singles and Doubles Draws	(Uruguay) Martín Cuevas (Argentina) Agustín Velotti; 3–6, 6–3, [10–6]	(United States) Christian Harrison (United States) Toby Kodat	(Slovakia) Lukáš Klein (Argentina) Sebastián Báez	(Czech Republic) Jiří Lehečka (Czech Republic) Petr Nouza (Czech Republic) Vít Kopřiva (Argentina) Agustín Velotti
September 28	Porto, Portugal; Hard; M25; Singles and Doubles Draws	(Portugal) Gastão Elias; 6–3, 6–3	(Portugal) Nuno Borges	(Italy) Giovanni Fonio (United States) Stefan Kozlov	(Italy) Alessandro Bega (Japan) Shuichi Sekiguchi (Portugal) Tiago Cação (Australia) Dayne Kelly
September 28	Porto, Portugal; Hard; M25; Singles and Doubles Draws	(Germany) Fabian Fallert (Germany) Johannes Härteis; 6–3, 7–6^{(7–5)}	(France) Dan Added (France) Sadio Doumbia	(Italy) Giovanni Fonio (United States) Stefan Kozlov	(Italy) Alessandro Bega (Japan) Shuichi Sekiguchi (Portugal) Tiago Cação (Australia) Dayne Kelly
September 28	Forbach, France; Carpet (indoor); M15; Singles and Doubles Draws	(France) Antoine Cornut-Chauvinc; 6–2, 6–4	(Belgium) Michael Geerts	(Austria) Alexander Erler (Germany) Elmar Ejupovic	(Netherlands) Igor Sijsling (Switzerland) Antoine Bellier (France) Joshua Dous Karpenschif (France) Johan Tatlot
September 28	Forbach, France; Carpet (indoor); M15; Singles and Doubles Draws	(Switzerland) Luca Castelnuovo (Switzerland) Jakub Paul; 7–6^{(7–4)}, 6–1	(France) Arthur Bouquier (France) Louis Dussin	(Austria) Alexander Erler (Germany) Elmar Ejupovic	(Netherlands) Igor Sijsling (Switzerland) Antoine Bellier (France) Joshua Dous Karpenschif (France) Johan Tatlot
September 28	Monastir, Tunisia; Hard; M15; Singles and Doubles Draws	(Lithuania) Laurynas Grigelis; 6–1, 7–5	(Slovenia) Tom Kočevar-Dešman	(Italy) Luca Potenza (Argentina) Thiago Agustín Tirante	(United Kingdom) Stuart Parker (France) Cyril Vandermeersch (Argentina) Matías Franco Descotte (Sweden) Filip Bergevi
September 28	Monastir, Tunisia; Hard; M15; Singles and Doubles Draws	(Tunisia) Aziz Dougaz (Tunisia) Skander Mansouri; 4–6, 7–6^{(7–1)}, [10–5]	(Germany) Mats Rosenkranz (Germany) Tom Schönenberg	(Italy) Luca Potenza (Argentina) Thiago Agustín Tirante	(United Kingdom) Stuart Parker (France) Cyril Vandermeersch (Argentina) Matías Franco Descotte (Sweden) Filip Bergevi
