= Zane Khan =

American tennis player

- Country (sports): United States
- Residence: Delray Beach, Florida, U.S.
- Born: February 11, 2002 (age 24) Houston, Texas, U.S.
- Height: 1.85 cm (6 ft 1 in)
- Turned pro: 2019
- Plays: Right-handed (two-handed backhand)
- Coach: Shariq Khan; Chris Begg; Sébastien Grosjean
- Prize money: $72,636

Singles
- Career record: 0–0 (at ATP Tour level, Grand Slam level, and in Davis Cup)
- Career titles: 0
- Highest ranking: No. 404 (8 November 2021)

Grand Slam singles results
- US Open: Q3 (2021)

Doubles
- Career record: 0–1 (at ATP Tour level, Grand Slam level, and in Davis Cup)
- Career titles: 0
- Highest ranking: No. 1,540 (5 April 2021)

Zane Khan (born February 11, 2002) is an American professional tennis player.

Khan has a career high ATP singles ranking of No. 404 achieved on 8 November 2021 and a doubles ranking of No. 1,540 achieved on 5 April 2021.

Khan made his ATP main draw debut at the 2020 European Open in the doubles draw partnering Luca Nardi.
