= 2021 Wimbledon Championships – Day-by-day summaries =

The 2021 Wimbledon Championships's order of play for main draw matches on the center court and outside courts, starting from June 28 until July 11.

All dates are BST (UTC+1).

== Day 1 (28 June) ==
- Seeds out:
  - Gentlemen's singles: (Greece) Stefanos Tsitsipas [3], (Italy) Jannik Sinner [19], (Georgia (country)) Nikoloz Basilashvili [24], (United States) Reilly Opelka [27], (Spain) Alejandro Davidovich Fokina [30]
  - Ladies' singles: (Czech Republic) Petra Kvitová [10], (Russia) Veronika Kudermetova [29]
- Schedule of play

Matches on main courts
Matches on Centre Court
Event	Winner	Loser	Score
Gentlemen's singles 1st round	(Serbia) Novak Djokovic [1]	(United Kingdom) Jack Draper [WC]	4–6, 6–1, 6–2, 6–2
Ladies' singles 1st round	(United States) Sloane Stephens	(Czech Republic) Petra Kvitová [10]	6–3, 6–4
Gentlemen's singles 1st round	(United Kingdom) Andy Murray [WC]	(Georgia (country)) Nikoloz Basilashvili [24]	6–4, 6–3, 5–7, 6–3
Matches on No. 1 Court
Event	Winner	Loser	Score
Ladies' singles 1st round	(Belarus) Aryna Sabalenka [2]	(Romania) Monica Niculescu [Q]	6–1, 6–4
Gentlemen's singles 1st round	(United States) Frances Tiafoe	(Greece) Stefanos Tsitsipas [3]	6–4, 6–4, 6–3
Ladies' singles 1st round	(Poland) Iga Świątek [7]	(Chinese Taipei) Hsieh Su-wei	6–4, 6–4
Ladies' singles 1st round	(United States) Kristie Ahn [LL]	(United Kingdom) Heather Watson	2–6, 7–6^{(7–3)}, 8–6
Matches on No. 2 Court
Event	Winner	Loser	Score
Ladies' singles 1st round	(Spain) Garbiñe Muguruza [11]	(France) Fiona Ferro	6–0, 6–1
Gentlemen's singles 1st round	(Russia) Andrey Rublev [5]	(Argentina) Federico Delbonis	4–6, 6–4, 6–1, 6–2
Gentlemen's singles 1st round	(Argentina) Diego Schwartzman [9] vs (France) Benoît Paire		6–3, 6–4, suspended
Gentlemen's singles 1st round	(United Kingdom) Daniel Evans [22] vs (Spain) Feliciano López		Postponed
Ladies' singles 1st round	(Romania) Mihaela Buzărnescu [PR] vs (United States) Venus Williams		Postponed
Matches on No. 3 Court
Event	Winner	Loser	Score
Ladies' singles 1st round	(United States) Madison Keys [23]	(United Kingdom) Katie Swan [Q]	6–3, 6–4
Ladies' singles 1st round	(United States) Sofia Kenin [4]	(China) Wang Xinyu [Q]	6–4, 6–2
Gentlemen's singles 1st round	(United Kingdom) Liam Broady [WC]	(Italy) Marco Cecchinato	6–3, 6–4, 6–0
Gentlemen's singles 1st round	(Canada) Denis Shapovalov [10] vs (Germany) Philipp Kohlschreiber [PR]		Postponed

== Day 2 (29 June) ==
- Seeds out:
  - Gentlemen's singles: (Australia) Alex de Minaur [15]
  - Ladies' singles: (United States) Serena Williams [6], (Netherlands) Kiki Bertens [17], (United States) Alison Riske [28]
- Schedule of play

Matches on main courts
Matches on Centre Court
Event	Winner	Loser	Score
Ladies' singles 1st round	(Australia) Ashleigh Barty [1]	(Spain) Carla Suárez Navarro [PR]	6–1, 6–7^{(1–7)}, 6–1
Gentlemen's singles 1st round	(Switzerland) Roger Federer [6]	(France) Adrian Mannarino	6–4, 6–7^{(3–7)}, 3–6, 6–2, retired
Ladies' singles 1st round	(Belarus) Aliaksandra Sasnovich	(United States) Serena Williams [6]	3–3, retired
Matches on No. 1 Court
Event	Winner	Loser	Score
Gentlemen's singles 1st round	(Germany) Alexander Zverev [4]	(Netherlands) Tallon Griekspoor [Q]	6–3, 6–4, 6–1
Ladies' singles 1st round	(Germany) Angelique Kerber [25]	(Serbia) Nina Stojanović	6–4, 6–3
Gentlemen's singles 1st round	(Russia) Daniil Medvedev [2]	(Germany) Jan-Lennard Struff	6–4, 6–1, 4–6, 7–6^{(7–3)}
Gentlemen's singles 1st round	(Australia) Nick Kyrgios vs (France) Ugo Humbert [21]		6–3, 4–6, 3–6, 6–1, 3–3, suspended
Matches on No. 2 Court
Event	Winner	Loser	Score
Gentlemen's singles 1st round	(United Kingdom) Daniel Evans [22]	(Spain) Feliciano López	7–6^{(7–4)}, 6–2, 7–5
Gentlemen's singles 1st round	(Argentina) Diego Schwartzman [9]	(France) Benoît Paire	6–3, 6–4, 6–0
Ladies' singles 1st round	(United States) Coco Gauff [20]	(United Kingdom) Francesca Jones [WC]	7–5, 6–4
Gentlemen's singles 1st round	(France) Lucas Pouille vs (United Kingdom) Cameron Norrie [29]		7–6^{(8–6)}, suspended
Ladies' singles 1st round	(France) Alizé Cornet vs (Canada) Bianca Andreescu [5]		Postponed
Matches on No. 3 Court
Event	Winner	Loser	Score
Ladies' singles 1st round	(United States) Venus Williams	(Romania) Mihaela Buzărnescu [PR]	7–5, 4–6, 6–3
Ladies' singles 1st round	(Czech Republic) Barbora Krejčíková [14]	(Denmark) Clara Tauson	6–3, 6–2
Gentlemen's singles 1st round	(Germany) Oscar Otte [Q]	(France) Arthur Rinderknech [Q]	4–6, 6–3, 6–2, 6–7^{(5–7)}, 13–12^{(7–2)}
Gentlemen's singles 1st round	(Spain) Fernando Verdasco vs (Bulgaria) Grigor Dimitrov [18]		Postponed
Gentlemen's singles 1st round	(Canada) Félix Auger-Aliassime [16] vs (Brazil) Thiago Monteiro		Postponed

== Day 3 (30 June) ==
- Seeds out:
  - Gentlemen's singles: (Spain) Pablo Carreño Busta [11], (Norway) Casper Ruud [12], (Russia) Aslan Karatsev [20], (France) Ugo Humbert [21], (United States) John Isner [28]
  - Ladies' singles: (United States) Sofia Kenin [4], (Canada) Bianca Andreescu [5], (Switzerland) Belinda Bencic [9], (United States) Jessica Pegula [22], (Estonia) Anett Kontaveit [24], (Croatia) Petra Martić [26], (Russia) Ekaterina Alexandrova [32]
- Schedule of play

Matches on main courts
Matches on Centre Court
Event	Winner	Loser	Score
Gentlemen's singles 2nd round	(Serbia) Novak Djokovic [1]	(South Africa) Kevin Anderson	6–3, 6–3, 6–3
Ladies' singles 2nd round	(Belarus) Aryna Sabalenka [2]	(United Kingdom) Katie Boulter [WC]	4–6, 6–3, 6–3
Gentlemen's singles 2nd round	(United Kingdom) Andy Murray [WC]	(Germany) Oscar Otte [Q]	6–3, 4–6, 4–6, 6–4, 6–2
Matches on No. 1 Court
Event	Winner	Loser	Score
Ladies' singles 1st round	(Ukraine) Elina Svitolina [3]	(Belgium) Alison Van Uytvanck	6–3, 2–6, 6–3
Gentlemen's singles 1st round	(Australia) Nick Kyrgios	(France) Ugo Humbert [21]	6–3, 4–6, 3–6, 6–1, 9–7
Gentlemen's singles 2nd round	(United Kingdom) Dan Evans [22]	(Serbia) Dušan Lajović	6–3, 6–3, 6–4
Ladies' singles 2nd round	(Tunisia) Ons Jabeur [21]	(United States) Venus Williams	7–5, 6–0
Matches on No. 2 Court
Event	Winner	Loser	Score
Ladies' singles 1st round	(France) Alizé Cornet	(Canada) Bianca Andreescu [5]	6–2, 6–1
Gentlemen's singles 1st round	(United Kingdom) Cameron Norrie [29]	(France) Lucas Pouille	6–7^{(6–8)}, 7–5, 6–2, 7–5
Gentlemen's singles 1st round	(Canada) Félix Auger-Aliassime [16]	(Brazil) Thiago Monteiro	6–3, 6–3, 6–3
Ladies' singles 2nd round	(Poland) Iga Świątek [7]	(Russia) Vera Zvonareva	6–1, 6–3
Ladies' singles 2nd round	(United States) Madison Brengle	(United States) Sofia Kenin [4]	6–2, 6–4
Matches on No. 3 Court
Event	Winner	Loser	Score
Gentlemen's singles 1st round	(Italy) Matteo Berrettini [7]	(Argentina) Guido Pella	6–4, 3–6, 6–4, 6–0
Gentlemen's singles 1st round	(Bulgaria) Grigor Dimitrov [18]	(Spain) Fernando Verdasco	3–6, 6–3, 6–4, 6–4
Ladies' singles 1st round	(Slovenia) Kaja Juvan	(Switzerland) Belinda Bencic [9]	6–3, 6–3
Ladies' singles 2nd round	(Spain) Garbiñe Muguruza [11]	(Netherlands) Lesley Pattinama Kerkhove [Q]	6–1, 6–4
Ladies' singles 2nd round	(United States) Sloane Stephens	(United States) Kristie Ahn [LL]	7–5, 6–3

== Day 4 (1 July) ==
- Seeds out:
  - Gentlemen's singles: (France) Gaël Monfils [13], (Bulgaria) Grigor Dimitrov [18]
  - Ladies' singles: (Ukraine) Elina Svitolina [3], (Belarus) Victoria Azarenka [12], (Greece) Maria Sakkari [15], (Russia) Daria Kasatkina [31]
  - Gentlemen's doubles: (Netherlands) Wesley Koolhof / (Netherlands) Jean-Julien Rojer [10], (Germany) Tim Pütz / (New Zealand) Michael Venus [12], (Belgium) Sander Gillé / (Belgium) Joran Vliegen [13]
  - Ladies' doubles: (Hungary) Tímea Babos / (France) Kristina Mladenovic [2], (Chile) Alexa Guarachi / (United States) Desirae Krawczyk [6], (United States) Hayley Carter / (Brazil) Luisa Stefani [8], (Croatia) Darija Jurak / (Slovenia) Andreja Klepač [10]
- Schedule of play

Matches on main courts
Matches on Centre Court
Event	Winner	Loser	Score
Ladies' singles 2nd round	(Australia) Ashleigh Barty [1]	(Russia) Anna Blinkova	6–4, 6–3
Ladies' singles 2nd round	(United States) Coco Gauff [20]	(Russia) Elena Vesnina [PR]	6–4, 6–3
Gentlemen's singles 2nd round	(Switzerland) Roger Federer [6]	(France) Richard Gasquet	7–6^{(7–1)}, 6–1, 6–4
Matches on No. 1 Court
Event	Winner	Loser	Score
Gentlemen's singles 2nd round	(United Kingdom) Cameron Norrie [29]	(Australia) Alex Bolt [WC]	6–3, 6–1, 6–2
Gentlemen's singles 2nd round	(Russia) Daniil Medvedev [2]	(Spain) Carlos Alcaraz [WC]	6–4, 6–1, 6–2
Ladies' singles 2nd round	(Romania) Sorana Cîrstea	(Belarus) Victoria Azarenka [12]	7–6^{(7–5)}, 3–6, 6–4
Matches on No. 2 Court
Event	Winner	Loser	Score
Gentlemen's singles 2nd round	(Germany) Alexander Zverev [4]	(United States) Tennys Sandgren	7–5, 6–2, 6–3
Ladies' singles 2nd round	(Poland) Magda Linette	(Ukraine) Elina Svitolina [3]	6–3, 6–4
Ladies' singles 2nd round	(Germany) Angelique Kerber [25]	(Spain) Sara Sorribes Tormo	7–5, 5–7, 6–4
Gentlemen's singles 2nd round	(Canada) Félix Auger-Aliassime [16]	(Sweden) Mikael Ymer	6–4, 4–6, 7–6^{(7–4)}, 6–1
Matches on No. 3 Court
Event	Winner	Loser	Score
Ladies' singles 2nd round	(Czech Republic) Barbora Krejčíková [14]	(Germany) Andrea Petkovic [PR]	7–5, 6–4
Gentlemen's singles 2nd round	(Italy) Matteo Berrettini [7]	(Netherlands) Botic van de Zandschulp [LL]	6–3, 6–4, 7–6^{(7–4)}
Ladies' singles 2nd round	(Latvia) Jeļena Ostapenko	(Russia) Daria Kasatkina [31]	6–1, 3–6, 8–6
Gentlemen's singles 2nd round	(Australia) Nick Kyrgios	(Italy) Gianluca Mager	7–6^{(9–7)}, 6–4, 6–4

== Day 5 (2 July) ==
- Seeds out:
  - Gentlemen's singles: (Argentina) Diego Schwartzman [9], (United Kingdom) Dan Evans [22], (Italy) Fabio Fognini [26]
  - Ladies' singles: (Spain) Garbiñe Muguruza [11], (Belgium) Elise Mertens [13]
  - Gentlemen's doubles: (Germany) Kevin Krawietz / (Romania) Horia Tecău [9]
  - Ladies' doubles: (United States) Nicole Melichar / (Netherlands) Demi Schuurs [4]
- Schedule of play

Matches on main courts
Matches on Centre Court
Event	Winner	Loser	Score
Ladies' singles 3rd round	(Tunisia) Ons Jabeur [21]	(Spain) Garbiñe Muguruza [11]	5–7, 6–3, 6–2
Gentlemen's singles 3rd round	(United States) Sebastian Korda	(United Kingdom) Dan Evans [22]	6–3, 3–6, 6–3, 6–4
Gentlemen's singles 3rd round	(Canada) Denis Shapovalov [10]	(United Kingdom) Andy Murray [WC]	6–4, 6–2, 6–2
Matches on No. 1 Court
Event	Winner	Loser	Score
Ladies' singles 3rd round	(Russia) Liudmila Samsonova [WC]	(United States) Sloane Stephens	6–2, 2–6, 6–4
Gentlemen's singles 3rd round	(Serbia) Novak Djokovic [1]	(United States) Denis Kudla [Q]	6–4, 6–3, 7–6^{(9–7)}
Ladies' singles 3rd round	(United States) Madison Keys [23]	(Belgium) Elise Mertens [13]	7–5, 6–3
Matches on No. 2 Court
Event	Winner	Loser	Score
Ladies' singles 3rd round	(Czech Republic) Karolína Plíšková [8]	(Czech Republic) Tereza Martincová	6–3, 6–3
Ladies' singles 3rd round	(Belarus) Aryna Sabalenka [2]	(Colombia) Camila Osorio [Q]	6–0, 6–3
Gentlemen's singles 3rd round	(Spain) Roberto Bautista Agut [8]	(Germany) Dominik Koepfer	7–5, 6–1, 7–6^{(7–4)}
Mixed doubles - 1st round	(Australia) Nick Kyrgios [WC] (United States) Venus Williams [WC]	(United States) Austin Krajicek (United States) Sabrina Santamaria	6–3, 3–6, 7–5
Matches on No. 3 Court
Event	Winner	Loser	Score
Gentlemen's singles 3rd round	(Russia) Andrey Rublev [5]	(Italy) Fabio Fognini [26]	6–3, 5–7, 6–4, 6–2
Gentlemen's singles 3rd round	(Hungary) Márton Fucsovics	(Argentina) Diego Schwartzman [9]	6–3, 6–3, 6–7^{(6–8)}, 6–4
Mixed doubles - 1st round	(United Kingdom) Joe Salisbury (United Kingdom) Harriet Dart	(Finland) Henri Kontinen (United Kingdom) Heather Watson	6–1, 7–6^{(7–3)}

== Day 6 (3 July) ==
- Seeds out:
  - Gentlemen's singles: (United Kingdom) Cameron Norrie [29], (United States) Taylor Fritz [31], (Croatia) Marin Čilić [32]
  - Ladies' singles: (Russia) Anastasia Pavlyuchenkova [16]
  - Gentlemen's doubles: (France) Pierre-Hugues Herbert / (France) Nicolas Mahut [2], (Croatia) Ivan Dodig / (Slovakia) Filip Polášek [5], (United Kingdom) Jamie Murray / (Brazil) Bruno Soares [7], (Finland) Henri Kontinen / (France) Édouard Roger-Vasselin [11], (New Zealand) Marcus Daniell / (Austria) Philipp Oswald [15]
  - Mixed doubles: (New Zealand) Michael Venus / (Chinese Taipei) Chan Hao-ching [8]
- Schedule of play

Matches on main courts
Matches on Centre Court
Event	Winner	Loser	Score
Ladies' singles 3rd round	(United States) Coco Gauff [20]	(Slovenia) Kaja Juvan	6–3, 6–3
Gentlemen's singles 3rd round	(Switzerland) Roger Federer [6]	(United Kingdom) Cameron Norrie [29]	6–4, 6–4, 5–7, 6–4
Ladies' singles 3rd round	(Australia) Ashleigh Barty [1]	(Czech Republic) Kateřina Siniaková	6–3, 7–5
Matches on No. 1 Court
Event	Winner	Loser	Score
Ladies' singles 3rd round	(United Kingdom) Emma Raducanu [WC]	(Romania) Sorana Cîrstea	6–3, 7–5
Gentlemen's singles 3rd round	(Canada) Félix Auger-Aliassime [16]	(Australia) Nick Kyrgios	2–6, 6–1, retired
Gentlemen's singles 3rd round	(Russia) Daniil Medvedev [2]	(Croatia) Marin Čilić [32]	6–7^{(3–7)}, 3–6, 6–3, 6–3, 6–2
Matches on No. 2 Court
Event	Winner	Loser	Score
Ladies' singles 3rd round	(Germany) Angelique Kerber [25]	(Belarus) Aliaksandra Sasnovich	2–6, 6–0, 6–1
Gentlemen's singles 3rd round	(Germany) Alexander Zverev [4]	(United States) Taylor Fritz [31]	6–7^{(3–7)}, 6–4, 6–3, 7–6^{(7–4)}
Ladies' doubles 2nd round	(United States) Coco Gauff [12] (United States) Caty McNally [12]	(Spain) Paula Badosa (Spain) Sara Sorribes Tormo	6–4, 6–4
Gentlemen's doubles 2nd round	(Spain) Jaume Munar (United Kingdom) Cameron Norrie	(Croatia) Ivan Dodig [5] (Slovakia) Filip Polášek [5]	7–6^{(12–10)}, 1–6, 7–5
Matches on No. 3 Court
Event	Winner	Loser	Score
Gentlemen's singles 3rd round	(Italy) Matteo Berrettini [7]	(Slovenia) Aljaž Bedene	6–4, 6–4, 6–4
Ladies' singles 3rd round	(Czech Republic) Barbora Krejčíková [14]	(Latvia) Anastasija Sevastova	7–6^{(7–1)}, 3–6, 7–5
Mixed doubles - 2nd round	(South Africa) Raven Klaasen [10] (Croatia) Darija Jurak [10]	(India) Divij Sharan (United Kingdom) Samantha Murray Sharan	3–6, 7–6^{(7–1)}, 6–3

== Middle Sunday (4 July) ==
As is tradition, Middle Sunday is a day of rest and no matches are played.

== Day 7 (5 July) ==
- Seeds out:
  - Gentlemen's singles: (Germany) Alexander Zverev [4], (Russia) Andrey Rublev [5], (Spain) Roberto Bautista Agut [8], (Chile) Cristian Garín [17], (Italy) Lorenzo Sonego [23]
  - Ladies' singles: (Poland) Iga Świątek [7], (Czech Republic) Barbora Krejčíková [14], (Kazakhstan) Elena Rybakina [18], (United States) Coco Gauff [20], (United States) Madison Keys [23], (Spain) Paula Badosa [30]
  - Men's doubles: (Australia) Max Purcell / (Australia) Luke Saville [16]
  - Ladies' doubles: (Canada) Sharon Fichman / (Mexico) Giuliana Olmos [9], (Germany) Laura Siegemund / (Russia) Vera Zvonareva [11], (Ukraine) Nadiia Kichenok / (Romania) Raluca Olaru [13], (United States) Asia Muhammad / (United States) Jessica Pegula [14]
  - Mixed doubles: (Japan) Ben McLachlan / (Japan) Ena Shibahara [15]
- Schedule of play

Matches on main courts
Matches on Centre Court
Event	Winner	Loser	Score
Gentlemen's singles 4th round	(Serbia) Novak Djokovic [1]	(Chile) Cristian Garín [17]	6–2, 6–4, 6–2
Ladies' singles 4th round	(Germany) Angelique Kerber [25]	(United States) Coco Gauff [20]	6–4, 6–4
Gentlemen's singles 4th round	(Switzerland) Roger Federer [6]	(Italy) Lorenzo Sonego [23]	7–5, 6–4, 6–2
Matches on No. 1 Court
Event	Winner	Loser	Score
Ladies' singles 4th round	(Australia) Ashleigh Barty [1]	(Czech Republic) Barbora Krejčíková [14]	7–5, 6–3
Gentlemen's singles 4th round	(Canada) Félix Auger-Aliassime [16]	(Germany) Alexander Zverev [4]	6–4, 7–6^{(8–6)}, 3–6, 3–6, 6–4
Ladies' singles 4th round	(Australia) Ajla Tomljanović	(United Kingdom) Emma Raducanu [WC]	6–4, 3–0, retired
Matches on No. 2 Court
Event	Winner	Loser	Score
Ladies' singles 4th round	(Tunisia) Ons Jabeur [21]	(Poland) Iga Świątek [7]	5–7, 6–1, 6–1
Gentlemen's singles 4th round	(Hungary) Márton Fucsovics	(Russia) Andrey Rublev [5]	6–3, 4–6, 4–6, 6–0, 6–3
Gentlemen's singles 4th round	(Poland) Hubert Hurkacz [14] vs (Russia) Daniil Medvedev [2]		2–6, 7–6^{(7–2)}, 3–6, 4–3, suspended
Matches on No. 3 Court
Event	Winner	Loser	Score
Ladies' singles 4th round	(Belarus) Aryna Sabalenka [2]	(Kazakhstan) Elena Rybakina [18]	6–3, 4–6, 6–3
Gentlemen's singles 4th round	(Canada) Denis Shapovalov [10]	(Spain) Roberto Bautista Agut [8]	6–1, 6–3, 7–5
Gentlemen's doubles 3rd round	(Colombia) Juan Sebastián Cabal [3] (Colombia) Robert Farah [3]	(Australia) Max Purcell [16] (Australia) Luke Saville [16]	6–3, 6–4, 2–6, 6–4
Mixed doubles - 2nd round	(France) Édouard Roger-Vasselin [4] (United States) Nicole Melichar [4]	(Australia) Nick Kyrgios [WC] (United States) Venus Williams [WC]	Walkover
Ladies' doubles 3rd round	(United States) Coco Gauff / (United States) Caty McNally [12] vs (Russia) Veronika Kudermetova / (Russia) Elena Vesnina [PR]		Postponed

== Day 8 (6 July) ==
- Seeds out:
  - Gentlemen's singles: (Russia) Daniil Medvedev [2]
  - Ladies' singles: (Czech Republic) Karolína Muchová [19], (Tunisia) Ons Jabeur [21]
  - Gentlemen's doubles: (Poland) Łukasz Kubot / (Brazil) Marcelo Melo [8]
  - Ladies' doubles: (United States) Coco Gauff / (United States) Caty McNally [12], (Slovakia) Viktória Kužmová / (Netherlands) Arantxa Rus [15]
  - Mixed doubles: (Netherlands) Wesley Koolhof / (Netherlands) Demi Schuurs [3], (United States) Rajeev Ram / (United States) Bethanie Mattek-Sands [5], (France) Fabrice Martin / (Chile) Alexa Guarachi [12]
- Schedule of play

Matches on main courts
Matches on Centre Court
Event	Winner	Loser	Score
Gentlemen's singles 4th round	(Poland) Hubert Hurkacz [14]	(Russia) Daniil Medvedev [2]	2–6, 7–6^{(7–2)}, 3–6, 6–3, 6–3
Ladies' singles Quarterfinals	(Belarus) Aryna Sabalenka [2]	(Tunisia) Ons Jabeur [21]	6–4, 6–3
Ladies' singles quarterfinals	(Australia) Ashleigh Barty [1]	(Australia) Ajla Tomljanović	6–1, 6–3
Ladies' doubles 3rd round	(Russia) Veronika Kudermetova [PR] (Russia) Elena Vesnina [PR]	(United States) Coco Gauff [12] (United States) Caty McNally [12]	7–6^{(7–0)}, 4–6, 6–3
Matches on No. 1 Court
Event	Winner	Loser	Score
Ladies' singles quarterfinals	(Czech Republic) Karolína Plíšková [8]	(Switzerland) Viktorija Golubic	6–2, 6–2
Ladies' singles quarterfinals	(Germany) Angelique Kerber [25]	(Czech Republic) Karolína Muchová [19]	6–2, 6–3
Gentlemen's doubles quarterfinals	(Croatia) Nikola Mektić [1] (Croatia) Mate Pavić [1]	(Poland) Łukasz Kubot [8] (Brazil) Marcelo Melo [8]	3–6, 4–6, 6–4, 7–6^{(7–4)}, 6–4
Matches on No. 2 Court
Event	Winner	Loser	Score
Mixed doubles - 3rd round	(India) Rohan Bopanna / (India) Sania Mirza [PR] vs (Netherlands) Jean-Julien Rojer / (Slovenia) Andreja Klepač [14]		3–6, suspended
Girls' singles - 1st round	(Czech Republic) Linda Klimovičová [SE]	(Finland) Laura Hietaranta	6–4, 6–1
Mixed doubles - 3rd round	(France) Jérémy Chardy / (United Kingdom) Naomi Broady [WC] vs (South Africa) Raven Klaasen / (Croatia) Darija Jurak [10]		Postponed
Gentlemen's doubles quarterfinals	(Sweden) André Göransson / (Norway) Casper Ruud vs (Spain) Marcel Granollers / (Argentina) Horacio Zeballos [4]		Postponed
Matches on No. 3 Court
Event	Winner	Loser	Score
Mixed doubles - 3rd round	(France) Édouard Roger-Vasselin / (United States) Nicole Melichar [4] vs (Belarus) Andrei Vasilevski / (Australia) Arina Rodionova		6–2, 3–2, suspended
Gentlemen's doubles quarterfinals	(Colombia) Juan Sebastián Cabal / (Colombia) Robert Farah [3] vs (United States) Rajeev Ram / (United Kingdom) Joe Salisbury [6]		Postponed
Boys' singles - 1st round	(Poland) Aleksander Orlikowski vs (United Kingdom) Jack Pinnington Jones [7]		Postponed

== Day 9 (7 July) ==
- Seeds out:
  - Gentlemen's singles: (Switzerland) Roger Federer [6], (Canada) Félix Auger-Aliassime [16], (Russia) Karen Khachanov [25]
  - Gentlemen's doubles: (Colombia) Juan Sebastián Cabal / (Colombia) Robert Farah [3], (South Africa) Raven Klaasen / (Japan) Ben McLachlan [14]
  - Ladies' doubles: (Czech Republic) Barbora Krejčíková / (Czech Republic) Kateřina Siniaková [1], (Chinese Taipei) Chan Hao-ching / (Chinese Taipei) Latisha Chan [7], (Czech Republic) Marie Bouzková [16] / (Czech Republic) Lucie Hradecká [16]
  - Mixed doubles: (Croatia) Ivan Dodig / (Chinese Taipei) Latisha Chan [6], (South Africa) Raven Klaasen / (Croatia) Darija Jurak [10], (Belgium) Sander Gillé / (United States) Hayley Carter [13]
- Schedule of play

Matches on main courts
Matches on Centre Court
Event	Winner	Loser	Score
Gentlemen's singles quarterfinals	(Serbia) Novak Djokovic [1]	(Hungary) Márton Fucsovics	6–3, 6–4, 6–4
Gentlemen's singles quarterfinals	(Poland) Hubert Hurkacz [14]	(Switzerland) Roger Federer [6]	6–3, 7–6^{(7–4)}, 6–0
Matches on No. 1 Court
Event	Winner	Loser	Score
Gentlemen's singles quarterfinals	(Canada) Denis Shapovalov [10]	(Russia) Karen Khachanov [25]	6–4, 3–6, 5–7, 6–1, 6–4
Gentlemen's singles quarterfinals	(Italy) Matteo Berrettini [7]	(Canada) Félix Auger-Aliassime [16]	6–3, 5–7, 7–5, 6–3
Matches on No. 2 Court
Event	Winner	Loser	Score
Ladies' doubles quarterfinals	(Chinese Taipei) Hsieh Su-wei [3] (Belgium) Elise Mertens [3]	(Serbia) Aleksandra Krunić (Serbia) Nina Stojanović	6–1, 6–3
Gentlemen's doubles quarterfinals	(United States) Rajeev Ram [6] (United Kingdom) Joe Salisbury [6]	(Colombia) Juan Sebastián Cabal [3] (Colombia) Robert Farah [3]	6–3, 6–4, 7–6^{(7–2)}
Mixed doubles - 3rd round	(Netherlands) Jean-Julien Rojer [14] (Slovenia) Andreja Klepač [14]	(India) Rohan Bopanna [PR] (India) Sania Mirza [PR]	6–3, 3–6, 11–9
Mixed doubles - 3rd round	(United Kingdom) Joe Salisbury (United Kingdom) Harriet Dart	(Austria) Oliver Marach (Ukraine) Lyudmyla Kichenok	6–3, 6–7^{(4–7)}, 6–3
Matches on No. 3 Court
Event	Winner	Loser	Score
Ladies' doubles quarterfinals	(Japan) Shuko Aoyama [5] (Japan) Ena Shibahara [5]	(Czech Republic) Marie Bouzková [16] (Czech Republic) Lucie Hradecká [16]	7–6^{(7–3)}, 7–5
Ladies' doubles quarterfinals	(United States) Caroline Dolehide (Australia) Storm Sanders	(Chinese Taipei) Chan Hao-ching [7] (Chinese Taipei) Latisha Chan [7]	7–5, 6–2
Mixed doubles - 3rd round	(France) Édouard Roger-Vasselin [4] (United States) Nicole Melichar [4]	(Belarus) Andrei Vasilevski (Australia) Arina Rodionova	6–2, 4–6, 6–4
Mixed doubles - 3rd round	(United Kingdom) Neal Skupski [7] (United States) Desirae Krawczyk [7]	(United Kingdom) Arthur Fery [Alt] (United Kingdom) Tara Moore [Alt]	7–6^{(7–5)}, 6–3
Ladies' doubles quarterfinals	(Russia) Veronika Kudermetova [PR] (Russia) Elena Vesnina [PR]	(Czech Republic) Barbora Krejčíková [1] (Czech Republic) Kateřina Siniaková [1]	6–7^{(6–8)}, 6–4, 9–7

== Day 10 (8 July) ==
- Seeds out:
  - Ladies' singles: (Belarus) Aryna Sabalenka [2], (Germany) Angelique Kerber [25]
  - Gentlemen's doubles: (United States) Rajeev Ram [6] / (United Kingdom) Joe Salisbury [6]
  - Mixed doubles: (Croatia) Mate Pavić / (Canada) Gabriela Dabrowski [2], (France) Édouard Roger-Vasselin / (United States) Nicole Melichar [4], (Netherlands) Jean-Julien Rojer / (Slovenia) Andreja Klepač [14]
- Schedule of play

Matches on main courts
Matches on Centre Court
Event	Winner	Loser	Score
Ladies' singles semifinals	(Australia) Ashleigh Barty [1]	(Germany) Angelique Kerber [25]	6–3, 7–6^{(7–3)}
Ladies' singles semifinals	(Czech Republic) Karolína Plíšková [8]	(Belarus) Aryna Sabalenka [2]	5–7, 6–4, 6–4
Mixed doubles - quarterfinals	(United Kingdom) Neal Skupski [7] (United States) Desirae Krawczyk [7]	(Netherlands) Jean-Julien Rojer [14] (Slovenia) Andreja Klepač [14]	7–6^{(8–6)}, 6–2
Matches on No. 1 Court
Event	Winner	Loser	Score
Gentlemen's doubles semifinals	(Croatia) Nikola Mektić [1] (Croatia) Mate Pavić [1]	(United States) Rajeev Ram [6] (United Kingdom) Joe Salisbury [6]	7–6^{(8–6)}, 6–3, 6–7^{(2–7)}, 7–6^{(7–5)}
Mixed doubles - quarterfinals	(Australia) John Peers [17] (China) Zhang Shuai [17]	(France) Édouard Roger-Vasselin [4] (United States) Nicole Melichar [4]	6–2, 6–4
Mixed doubles - quarterfinals	(United Kingdom) Joe Salisbury (United Kingdom) Harriet Dart	(France) Jérémy Chardy [WC] (United Kingdom) Naomi Broady [WC]	6–4, 4–6, 5–7
Matches on No. 2 Court
Event	Winner	Loser	Score
Girls' singles - 2nd round	(United Kingdom) Matilda Mutavdzic [13]	(Czech Republic) Darja Viďmanová	7–5, 6–7^{(7–3)}, 6–1
Gentlemen's doubles semifinals	(Spain) Marcel Granollers [4] (Argentina) Horacio Zeballos [4]	(Italy) Simone Bolelli (Argentina) Máximo González	6–4, 6–4, 7–6^{(7–5)}
Mixed doubles - quarterfinals	(Germany) Kevin Krawietz [9] (Czech Republic) Květa Peschke [9]	(Croatia) Mate Pavić [2] (Canada) Gabriela Dabrowski [2]	6–3, 7–6^{(7–3)}, 9–7
Matches on No. 3 Court
Event	Winner	Loser	Score
Girls' Singles second round	(Andorra) Victoria Jiménez Kasintseva [1]	(United Kingdom) Eva Shaw	7–6^{(7–4)}, 6–4
Boys' Singles second round	(United Kingdom) Jack Pinnington Jones [7]	(Brazil) João Victor Couto Loureiro	6–4, 4–6, 6–1
Boys' Doubles second round	(United States) Samir Banerjee (Japan) Kokoro Isomura	(United Kingdom) Jack Pinnington Jones [1] (China) Shang Juncheng [1]	Walkover
Boys' Singles second round	(Brazil) Pedro Boscardin Dias [5]	(United Kingdom) Lui Maxted	6–3, 3–6, 6–4
Girls' Doubles second round	(Czech Republic) Darja Viďmanová (Slovakia) Radka Zelníčková	(Italy) Eleonora Alvisi (Italy) Matilde Paoletti	Walkover
Girls' Doubles second round	(United States) Elizabeth Coleman (United States) Madison Sieg	(Germany) Nicole Rivkin (Belgium) Hanne Vandewinkel	6–3, 4–6, [10–5]

== Day 11 (9 July) ==
- Seeds out:
  - Gentlemen's singles: (Canada) Denis Shapovalov [10], (Poland) Hubert Hurkacz [14]
  - Ladies' doubles: (Japan) Shuko Aoyama / (Japan) Ena Shibahara [5]
  - Mixed doubles: (Germany) Kevin Krawietz / (Czech Republic) Květa Peschke [9]
- Schedule of play

Matches on main courts
Matches on Centre Court
Event	Winner	Loser	Score
Gentlemen's singles semifinals	(Italy) Matteo Berrettini [7]	(Poland) Hubert Hurkacz [14]	6–3, 6–0, 6–7^{(3–7)}, 6–4
Gentlemen's singles semifinals	(Serbia) Novak Djokovic [1]	(Canada) Denis Shapovalov [10]	7–6^{(7–3)}, 7–5, 7–5
Mixed doubles - semifinals	(United Kingdom) Joe Salisbury (United Kingdom) Harriet Dart	(Germany) Kevin Krawietz [9] (Czech Republic) Květa Peschke [9]	6–2, 4–6, 6–4
Matches on No. 1 Court
Event	Winner	Loser	Score
Ladies' doubles semifinals	(Chinese Taipei) Hsieh Su-wei [3] (Belgium) Elise Mertens [3]	(Japan) Shuko Aoyama [5] (Japan) Ena Shibahara [5]	6–4, 1–6, 6–3
Ladies' doubles semifinals	(Russia) Veronika Kudermetova (Russia) Elena Vesnina	(United States) Caroline Dolehide (Australia) Storm Sanders	7–6^{(8–6)}, 3–6, 7–5
Boys' singles - quarterfinals	(China) Shang Juncheng [1]	(Switzerland) Jérôme Kym [11]	3–6, 7–6^{(7–2)}, 6–4
Matches on No. 3 Court
Event	Winner	Loser	Score
Boys' singles - third round	(United Kingdom) Jack Pinnington Jones [7]	(North Macedonia) Kalin Ivanovski	7–5, 6–0
Girls' singles - quarterfinals	(Andorra) Victoria Jiménez Kasintseva [1]	(United Kingdom) Alicia Dudeney [WC]	3–6, 6–2, 6–1
Boys' singles - quarterfinals	(France) Sascha Gueymard Wayenburg	(United States) Bruno Kuzuhara [4]	6–7^{(5–7)}, 6–4, 6–2
Boys' singles - quarterfinals	(United States) Victor Lilov	(United Kingdom) Jack Pinnington Jones [7]	4–6, 6–4, 6–3

== Day 12 (10 July) ==
- Seeds out:
  - Ladies' singles: (Czech Republic) Karolína Plíšková [8]
  - Gentlemen's doubles: (Spain) Marcel Granollers / (Argentina) Horacio Zeballos [4]
  - Mixed doubles: (Australia) John Peers / (China) Shuai Zhang [17]
- Schedule of play

Matches on main courts
Matches on Centre Court
Event	Winner	Loser	Score
Ladies' singles final	(Australia) Ashleigh Barty [1]	(Czech Republic) Karolína Plíšková [8]	6–3, 6–7^{(4–7)}, 6–3
Ladies' doubles final	(Chinese Taipei) Hsieh Su-wei [3] (Belgium) Elise Mertens [3]	(Russia) Veronika Kudermetova [PR] (Russia) Elena Vesnina [PR]	3–6, 7–5, 9–7
Gentlemen's doubles final	(Croatia) Nikola Mektić [1] (Croatia) Mate Pavić [1]	(Spain) Marcel Granollers [4] (Argentina) Horacio Zeballos [4]	6–4, 7–6^{(7–5)}, 2–6, 7–5
Matches on No. 1 Court
Event	Winner	Loser	Score
Boys' singles - semifinals	(United States) Samir Banerjee	(France) Sascha Gueymard Wayenburg	7–6^{(7–3)}, 4–6, 6–2
Mixed doubles - semifinals	(United Kingdom) Neal Skupski [7] (United States) Desirae Krawczyk [7]	(Australia) John Peers [17] (China) Shuai Zhang [17]	3–6, 7–6^{(7–4)}, 7–5
Girls' singles - semifinals	(Germany) Nastasja Schunk	(Andorra) Victoria Kasintseva [1]	6–4, 4–6, 6–4
Matches on No. 3 Court
Event	Winner	Loser	Score
Quad Wheelchair Singles final	(Australia) Dylan Alcott [1]	(Netherlands) Sam Schröder	6–2, 6–2
Gentlemen's Wheelchair Doubles final	(United Kingdom) Alfie Hewett (United Kingdom) Gordon Reid	(Netherlands) Tom Egberink (Belgium) Joachim Gerard	7–5, 6–2
Ladies' Wheelchair Doubles final	(Japan) Yui Kamiji [2] (United Kingdom) Jordanne Whiley [2]	(South Africa) Kgothatso Montjane (United Kingdom) Lucy Shuker	6–0, 7–6^{(7–0)}

== Day 13 (11 July) ==
- Seeds out:
  - Gentlemen's singles: (Italy) Matteo Berrettini [7]
- Schedule of play

Matches on main courts
Matches on Centre Court
Event	Winner	Loser	Score
Gentlemen's singles final	(Serbia) Novak Djokovic [1]	(Italy) Matteo Berrettini [7]	6–7^{(4–7)}, 6–4, 6–4, 6–3
Mixed doubles - Final	(United Kingdom) Neal Skupski [7] (United States) Desirae Krawczyk [7]	(United Kingdom) Joe Salisbury (United Kingdom) Harriet Dart	6–2, 7–6^{(7–1)}
Matches on No. 1 Court
Event	Winner	Loser	Score
Boys' singles - final	(United States) Samir Banerjee	(United States) Victor Lilov	7–5, 6–3
Girls' singles - final	(Spain) Ane Mintegi del Olmo	(Germany) Nastasja Schunk	2–6, 6–4, 6–1
Ladies' Wheelchair Singles final	(Netherlands) Diede de Groot [1]	(South Africa) Kgothatso Montjane	6–2, 6–2
Matches on No. 3 Court
Event	Winner	Loser	Score
Gentlemen's Wheelchair Singles final	(Belgium) Joachim Gérard	(United Kingdom) Gordon Reid	6–2, 7–6^{(7–2)}
