= 2021 Wimbledon Championships – Women's singles qualifying =

Women's singles qualifying
- 2021 Wimbledon Championships

Events
Singles	men	women		boys	girls
Doubles	men	women	mixed	boys	girls
WC Singles	men	women	quad
WC Doubles	men	women	quad
Legends	men	women	seniors

Qualification
Singles	men	women
← 2019 ·	Wimbledon Championships	· 2022 →

The 2021 Wimbledon Championships – Women's Singles Qualifying was a series of tennis matches that took place from 22 to 25 June 2021 (was originally to end on 24 June 2021 resulting a heavy rain on the first day) to determine the sixteen qualifiers into the main draw of the 2021 Wimbledon Championships – Women's singles, and, if necessary, the lucky losers.

Players who neither have high enough rankings nor receive wild cards for the main draw may participate in the qualifying tournament for the annual Wimbledon Tennis Championships.

== Seeds ==
1. (Colombia) Camila Osorio (qualified)
2. (Bulgaria) Viktoriya Tomova (second round)
3. (Italy) Sara Errani (first round)
4. (Russia) Anna Kalinskaya (qualified)
5. (Germany) Anna-Lena Friedsam (first round)
6. (United States) Caty McNally (second round)
7. (Hungary) Tímea Babos (moved into main draw)
8. (Bulgaria) Tsvetana Pironkova (qualifying competition, lucky loser)
9. (Romania) Irina Bara (first round)
10. (France) Océane Dodin (qualifying competition)
11. (Egypt) Mayar Sherif (second round)
12. (China) Wang Yafan (qualifying competition, lucky loser)
13. (United States) Kristie Ahn (qualifying competition, lucky loser)
14. (Ukraine) Anhelina Kalinina (qualifying competition)
15. (Belgium) Greet Minnen (qualified)
16. (United States) Claire Liu (qualified)
17. (Switzerland) Stefanie Vögele (first round)
18. (Slovakia) Anna Karolína Schmiedlová (second round)
19. (Australia) Astra Sharma (qualifying competition, lucky loser)
20. (Ukraine) Katarina Zavatska (first round)
21. (Belgium) Ysaline Bonaventure (second round)
22. (France) Harmony Tan (second round)
23. (Croatia) Ana Konjuh (qualified)
24. (Belarus) Olga Govortsova (qualified)
25. (Poland) Katarzyna Kawa (second round)
26. (Russia) Kamilla Rakhimova (second round)
27. (Mexico) Renata Zarazúa (first round)
28. (Australia) Maddison Inglis (second round)
29. (China) Wang Xiyu (second round)
30. (China) Wang Xinyu (qualified)
31. (France) Clara Burel (qualified)
32. (Poland) Magdalena Fręch (second round)

== Qualifiers ==
1. (Colombia) Camila Osorio
2. (United States) Danielle Lao
3. (France) Clara Burel
4. (Russia) Anna Kalinskaya
5. (United States) Katie Volynets
6. (United Kingdom) Katie Swan
7. (China) Wang Xinyu
8. (Croatia) Ana Konjuh
9. (Belarus) Olga Govortsova
10. (Australia) Ellen Perez
11. (Netherlands) Lesley Pattinama Kerkhove
12. (Ukraine) Lesia Tsurenko
13. (Romania) Monica Niculescu
14. (Russia) Vitalia Diatchenko
15. (Belgium) Greet Minnen
16. (United States) Claire Liu

== Lucky losers ==
1. (United States) Kristie Ahn
2. (Bulgaria) Tsvetana Pironkova
3. (Australia) Astra Sharma
4. (China) Wang Yafan

== Qualifying draw ==
=== First qualifier ===
First round
1	(Colombia) Camila Osorio	6	3	6
PR	(Chinese Taipei) Liang En-shuo	4	6	4
(Hungary) Panna Udvardy	3	6	7
(Paraguay) Verónica Cepede Royg	6	3	5
PR	(France) Jessika Ponchet	6^{1}	3
(Spain) Nuria Párrizas Díaz	7^{7}	6
(Russia) Marina Melnikova	3	3
29	(China) Wang Xiyu	6	6

Second round
1	(Colombia) Camila Osorio	6	3	6
(Hungary) Panna Udvardy	4	6	2
(Spain) Nuria Párrizas Díaz	7^{7}	6
29	(China) Wang Xiyu	6^{5}	3

Qualifying competition
1	(Colombia) Camila Osorio	3	6	6
(Spain) Nuria Párrizas Díaz	6	3	2

=== Second qualifier ===
First round
2	(Bulgaria) Viktoriya Tomova	6	6
(Spain) Irene Burillo Escorihuela	2	2
(United States) Danielle Lao	6	6
PR	(Romania) Alexandra Dulgheru	3	1
(Poland) Urszula Radwańska	6	6
(China) Xun Fangying	1	0
(Switzerland) Susan Bandecchi	3	6	3
18	(Slovakia) Anna Karolína Schmiedlová	6	3	6

Second round
2	(Bulgaria) Viktoriya Tomova	1	6	4
(United States) Danielle Lao	6	2	6
(Poland) Urszula Radwańska	6	7
18	(Slovakia) Anna Karolína Schmiedlová	3	5

Qualifying competition
(United States) Danielle Lao	6	6
(Poland) Urszula Radwańska	3	2

=== Third qualifier ===
First round
3	(Italy) Sara Errani	6	6^{2}	1
(Australia) Storm Sanders	3	7^{7}	6
(Serbia) Aleksandra Krunić	7	7^{7}
(Hungary) Anna Bondár	5	6^{4}
(United States) Sachia Vickery	6	4	6
(Japan) Chihiro Muramatsu	3	6	1
(Poland) Maja Chwalińska	6^{5}	4
31	(France) Clara Burel	7^{7}	6

Second round
(Australia) Storm Sanders	6	6
(Serbia) Aleksandra Krunić	3	2
(United States) Sachia Vickery	7	2	3
31	(France) Clara Burel	5	6	6

Qualifying competition
(Australia) Storm Sanders	6	3	5
31	(France) Clara Burel	4	6	7

=== Fourth qualifier ===
First round
4	(Russia) Anna Kalinskaya	4	6	6
(Hungary) Dalma Gálfi	6	4	1
(Slovakia) Viktória Kužmová	2	2
(Netherlands) Indy de Vroome	6	6
(United States) Grace Min	2	4
(Australia) Priscilla Hon	6	6
(China) You Xiaodi	2	4
26	(Russia) Kamilla Rakhimova	6	6

Second round
4	(Russia) Anna Kalinskaya	6	6
(Netherlands) Indy de Vroome	3	2
(Australia) Priscilla Hon	6	6
26	(Russia) Kamilla Rakhimova	3	2

Qualifying competition
4	(Russia) Anna Kalinskaya	7	1	7
(Australia) Priscilla Hon	5	6	5

=== Fifth qualifier ===
First round
5	(Germany) Anna-Lena Friedsam	4	5
WC	(United Kingdom) Eden Silva	6	7
(Croatia) Tereza Mrdeža	1	0
(United States) Katie Volynets	6	6
(Ukraine) Daria Snigur	6	2	4
(Brazil) Beatriz Haddad Maia	3	6	6
(United States) Allie Kiick	2	2
21	(Belgium) Ysaline Bonaventure	6	6

Second round
WC	(United Kingdom) Eden Silva	1	2
(United States) Katie Volynets	6	6
(Brazil) Beatriz Haddad Maia	7^{7}	6
21	(Belgium) Ysaline Bonaventure	6^{2}	1

Qualifying competition
(United States) Katie Volynets	7	6
(Brazil) Beatriz Haddad Maia	5	4

=== Sixth qualifier ===
First round
6	(United States) Caty McNally	4	6	6
(Serbia) Olga Danilović	6	1	2
(Australia) Lizette Cabrera	5	2
WC	(United Kingdom) Katie Swan	7	6
(Australia) Arina Rodionova	6	6
(Italy) Giulia Gatto-Monticone	3	0
(Turkey) Pemra Özgen	2	5
32	(Poland) Magdalena Fręch	6	7

Second round
6	(United States) Caty McNally	6	6^{4}	5
WC	(United Kingdom) Katie Swan	4	7^{7}	7
(Australia) Arina Rodionova	7	7
32	(Poland) Magdalena Fręch	5	5

Qualifying competition
WC	(United Kingdom) Katie Swan	6	6
(Australia) Arina Rodionova	0	4

=== Seventh qualifier ===
First round
Alt	(Italy) Jessica Pieri	4	6	0
(Austria) Barbara Haas	6	2	6
PR	(Czech Republic) Tereza Smitková	5	7^{7}	6
(Romania) Jaqueline Cristian	7	6^{1}	2
(Bulgaria) Elitsa Kostova	6	7
(Australia) Destanee Aiava	4	5
(United States) Robin Anderson	5	6^{3}
30	(China) Wang Xinyu	7	7^{7}

Second round
(Austria) Barbara Haas	6^{6}	3
PR	(Czech Republic) Tereza Smitková	7^{8}	6
(Bulgaria) Elitsa Kostova	2	1
30	(China) Wang Xinyu	6	6

Qualifying competition
PR	(Czech Republic) Tereza Smitková	4	3
30	(China) Wang Xinyu	6	6

=== Eighth qualifier ===
First round
8	(Bulgaria) Tsvetana Pironkova	6	6
(United States) Usue Maitane Arconada	1	0
(Hungary) Réka Luca Jani	5	3
WC	(United Kingdom) Naiktha Bains	7	6
(Georgia (country)) Mariam Bolkvadze	4	6	4
(Russia) Varvara Flink	6	2	6
WC	(United Kingdom) Matilda Mutavdzic	1	2
23	(Croatia) Ana Konjuh	6	6

Second round
8	(Bulgaria) Tsvetana Pironkova	6	6
WC	(United Kingdom) Naiktha Bains	1	2
(Russia) Varvara Flink	0	7	3
23	(Croatia) Ana Konjuh	6	5	6

Qualifying competition
8	(Bulgaria) Tsvetana Pironkova	2	6	2
23	(Croatia) Ana Konjuh	6	4	6

=== Ninth qualifier ===
First round
9	(Romania) Irina Bara	7	2	3
(Spain) Cristina Bucșa	5	6	6
(Luxembourg) Mandy Minella	2	6	1
(Ukraine) Kateryna Bondarenko	6	2	6
(Slovakia) Rebecca Šramková	7^{7}	6
(Netherlands) Richèl Hogenkamp	6^{2}	4
(Belgium) Marie Benoît	5	4
24	(Belarus) Olga Govortsova	7	6

Second round
(Spain) Cristina Bucșa	6	6
(Ukraine) Kateryna Bondarenko	1	1
(Slovakia) Rebecca Šramková	6	6^{2}	2
24	(Belarus) Olga Govortsova	4	7^{7}	6

Qualifying competition
(Spain) Cristina Bucșa	3	2
24	(Belarus) Olga Govortsova	6	6

=== Tenth qualifier ===
First round
10	(France) Océane Dodin	7^{7}	6
(Spain) Eva Guerrero Álvarez	6^{5}	3
(Romania) Elena-Gabriela Ruse	2	2
(Switzerland) Simona Waltert	6	6
(Australia) Ellen Perez	7	7
(Switzerland) Leonie Küng	5	5
(Austria) Julia Grabher	6	6
20	(Ukraine) Katarina Zavatska	2	3

Second round
10	(France) Océane Dodin	7	7^{7}
(Switzerland) Simona Waltert	5	6^{5}
(Australia) Ellen Perez	6	6
(Austria) Julia Grabher	0	3

Qualifying competition
10	(France) Océane Dodin	6^{4}	6^{5}
(Australia) Ellen Perez	7^{7}	7^{7}

=== Eleventh qualifier ===
First round
11	(Egypt) Mayar Sherif	6	6
(Romania) Irina Fetecău	3	1
(Russia) Natalia Vikhlyantseva	6	3	4
(Germany) Jule Niemeier	3	6	6
(Chile) Daniela Seguel	4	2
(Netherlands) Lesley Pattinama Kerkhove	6	6
(Serbia) Natalija Kostić	2	1
28	(Australia) Maddison Inglis	6	6

Second round
11	(Egypt) Mayar Sherif	4	3
(Germany) Jule Niemeier	6	6
(Netherlands) Lesley Pattinama Kerkhove	7^{7}	6^{4}	6
28	(Australia) Maddison Inglis	6^{0}	7^{7}	1

Qualifying competition
(Germany) Jule Niemeier	4	6	7
(Netherlands) Lesley Pattinama Kerkhove	6	2	9

=== Twelfth qualifier ===
First round
12	(China) Wang Yafan	6	6
(Belgium) Maryna Zanevska	3	3
(Spain) Lara Arruabarrena	6^{3}	5
(Croatia) Jana Fett	7^{7}	7
(Ukraine) Lesia Tsurenko	6	6
(Romania) Gabriela Talabă	4	3
WC	(United Kingdom) Tara Moore	7^{7}	6
27	(Mexico) Renata Zarazúa	6^{3}	2

Second round
12	(China) Wang Yafan	7^{7}	6
(Croatia) Jana Fett	6^{3}	3
(Ukraine) Lesia Tsurenko	6	6
WC	(United Kingdom) Tara Moore	4	1

Qualifying competition
12	(China) Wang Yafan	7	2	2
(Ukraine) Lesia Tsurenko	5	6	6

=== Thirteenth qualifier ===
First round
13	(United States) Kristie Ahn	1	7	6
(United States) Caroline Dolehide	6	5	2
(Georgia (country)) Ekaterine Gorgodze	6	6
WC	(United Kingdom) Eva Shaw	2	2
(Romania) Monica Niculescu	6	6
(Norway) Ulrikke Eikeri	3	3
(United States) Asia Muhammad	7^{10}	6
17	(Switzerland) Stefanie Vögele	6^{8}	3

Second round
13	(United States) Kristie Ahn	6	6
(Georgia (country)) Ekaterine Gorgodze	2	3
(Romania) Monica Niculescu	6	6
(United States) Asia Muhammad	3	2

Qualifying competition
13	(United States) Kristie Ahn	5	1
(Romania) Monica Niculescu	7	6

=== Fourteenth qualifier ===
First round
14	(Ukraine) Anhelina Kalinina	6	6
(Spain) Georgina García Pérez	1	1
(Russia) Valeria Savinykh	4	3
(Russia) Anastasia Gasanova	6	6
(Russia) Vitalia Diatchenko	6	6
(South Korea) Han Na-lae	4	4
(Italy) Martina Di Giuseppe	2	6	4
25	(Poland) Katarzyna Kawa	6	4	6

Second round
14	(Ukraine) Anhelina Kalinina	3	6	6
(Russia) Anastasia Gasanova	6	1	2
(Russia) Vitalia Diatchenko	7	6
25	(Poland) Katarzyna Kawa	5	1

Qualifying competition
14	(Ukraine) Anhelina Kalinina	4	3
(Russia) Vitalia Diatchenko	6	6

=== Fifteenth qualifier ===
First round
15	(Belgium) Greet Minnen	6	6^{6}	6
(Japan) Kurumi Nara	3	7^{8}	1
(Japan) Mayo Hibi	6	6
(United States) Whitney Osuigwe	2	4
(India) Ankita Raina	3	6^{1}
(United States) Varvara Lepchenko	6	7^{7}
(Turkey) Çağla Büyükakçay	2	4
22	(France) Harmony Tan	6	6

Second round
15	(Belgium) Greet Minnen	6	6
(Japan) Mayo Hibi	4	0
(United States) Varvara Lepchenko	6	3	6
22	(France) Harmony Tan	4	6	2

Qualifying competition
15	(Belgium) Greet Minnen	6	6
(United States) Varvara Lepchenko	2	2

=== Sixteenth qualifier ===
First round
16	(United States) Claire Liu	6	6
(United States) Jamie Loeb	3	2
(Bulgaria) Isabella Shinikova	2	7^{7}	6
(United States) Francesca Di Lorenzo	6	6^{5}	2
(China) Lu Jiajing	2	2
(Slovakia) Kristína Kučová	6	6
(Germany) Katharina Gerlach	4	0
19	(Australia) Astra Sharma	6	6

Second round
16	(United States) Claire Liu	6	6
(Bulgaria) Isabella Shinikova	4	3
(Slovakia) Kristína Kučová	7^{7}	4	3
19	(Australia) Astra Sharma	6^{4}	6	6

Qualifying competition
16	(United States) Claire Liu	4	6	6
19	(Australia) Astra Sharma	6	2	1
