= 2021 Wimbledon Championships – Men's singles qualifying =

Men's singles qualifying
- 2021 Wimbledon Championships

Events
Singles	men	women		boys	girls
Doubles	men	women	mixed	boys	girls
WC Singles	men	women	quad
WC Doubles	men	women	quad
Legends	men	women	seniors

Qualification
Singles	men	women
← 2019 ·	Wimbledon Championships	· 2022 →

The 2021 Wimbledon Championships – Men's Singles Qualifying is a series of tennis matches that was originally scheduled to take place from 21 to 24 June 2021. However, due to a heavy rain on the first day, it was rescheduled from 22 to 25 June 2021, to determine the sixteen qualifiers into the main draw of the 2021 Wimbledon Championships – Men's singles, and, if necessary, the lucky losers.

Players who neither have high enough rankings nor receive wild cards for the main draw may participate in the qualifying tournament for the annual Wimbledon Tennis Championships.

This was the last appearance for the former world number 12 Viktor Troicki. He lost in the second round to Brandon Nakashima.

== Seeds ==
1. (Poland) Kamil Majchrzak (qualifying competition)
2. (United States) Mackenzie McDonald (qualified)
3. (Slovakia) Andrej Martin (second round)
4. (Argentina) Francisco Cerúndolo (qualifying competition)
5. (Japan) Yasutaka Uchiyama (qualifying competition, lucky loser)
6. (United States) Denis Kudla (qualified)
7. (France) Arthur Rinderknech (qualified)
8. (Netherlands) Tallon Griekspoor (qualified)
9. (France) Benjamin Bonzi (qualified)
10. (Spain) Bernabé Zapata Miralles (qualified)
11. (Brazil) Thiago Seyboth Wild (second round)
12. (Bosnia and Herzegovina) Damir Džumhur (second round)
13. (Slovakia) Jozef Kovalík (first round)
14. (Bolivia) Hugo Dellien (second round)
15. (France) Grégoire Barrère (qualified)
16. (Australia) Christopher O'Connell (qualified)
17. (Germany) Peter Gojowczyk (first round)
18. (Peru) Juan Pablo Varillas (first round)
19. (Spain) Carlos Taberner (second round)
20. (Germany) Cedrik-Marcel Stebe (first round)
21. (Switzerland) Henri Laaksonen (first round)
22. (United States) Brandon Nakashima (qualified)
23. (Netherlands) Botic van de Zandschulp (qualifying competition, lucky loser)
24. (Russia) Evgeny Donskoy (first round)
25. (Italy) Federico Gaio (qualifying competition)
26. (Argentina) Juan Manuel Cerúndolo (first round)
27. (Czech Republic) Tomáš Macháč (qualifying competition)
28. (Serbia) Nikola Milojević (qualifying competition)
29. (India) Prajnesh Gunneswaran (first round)
30. (United States) Maxime Cressy (qualifying competition)
31. (France) Antoine Hoang (qualified)
32. (Australia) Marc Polmans (qualified)

== Qualifiers ==
1. (Chile) Marcelo Tomás Barrios Vera
2. (United States) Mackenzie McDonald
3. (United States) Brandon Nakashima
4. (China) Zhang Zhizhen
5. (Germany) Oscar Otte
6. (United States) Denis Kudla
7. (France) Arthur Rinderknech
8. (Netherlands) Tallon Griekspoor
9. (France) Benjamin Bonzi
10. (Spain) Bernabé Zapata Miralles
11. (Argentina) Marco Trungelliti
12. (France) Antoine Hoang
13. (Australia) Marc Polmans
14. (Germany) Daniel Masur
15. (France) Grégoire Barrère
16. (Australia) Christopher O'Connell

== Lucky losers ==
1. (Netherlands) Botic van de Zandschulp
2. (Japan) Yasutaka Uchiyama

== Qualifying draw ==
=== First qualifier ===
First round
1	(Poland) Kamil Majchrzak	6	6
(Germany) Yannick Maden	1	4
(Argentina) Guido Andreozzi	4	4
(Netherlands) Robin Haase	6	6
(Chile) Marcelo Tomás Barrios Vera	7^{7}	7^{7}
(United States) Mitchell Krueger	6^{2}	6^{5}
(France) Enzo Couacaud	4	6	6
26	(Argentina) Juan Manuel Cerúndolo	6	2	3

Second round
1	(Poland) Kamil Majchrzak	6^{5}	7^{7}	6
(Netherlands) Robin Haase	7^{7}	6^{4}	4
(Chile) Marcelo Tomás Barrios Vera	7^{7}	7^{7}
(France) Enzo Couacaud	6^{5}	6^{4}

Qualifying competition
1	(Poland) Kamil Majchrzak	4	6	6^{4}	3
(Chile) Marcelo Tomás Barrios Vera	6	4	7^{7}	6

=== Second qualifier ===
First round
2	(United States) Mackenzie McDonald	6^{5}	7	6
(Belgium) Kimmer Coppejans	7^{7}	5	2
(Italy) Lorenzo Giustino	5	6^{2}
(Ukraine) Illya Marchenko	7	7^{7}
(Dominican Republic) Roberto Cid Subervi	6^{7}	6	1
(Switzerland) Marc-Andrea Hüsler	7^{9}	4	6
(Australia) Thanasi Kokkinakis	6^{5}	6^{3}
30	(United States) Maxime Cressy	7^{7}	7^{7}

Second round
2	(United States) Mackenzie McDonald	6	3	6
(Ukraine) Illya Marchenko	1	6	4
(Switzerland) Marc-Andrea Hüsler	3	7^{7}	4
30	(United States) Maxime Cressy	6	6^{5}	6

Qualifying competition
2	(United States) Mackenzie McDonald	3	4	6	6	6
30	(United States) Maxime Cressy	6	6	3	4	4

=== Third qualifier ===
First round
3	(Slovakia) Andrej Martin	6	6
(Germany) Mats Moraing	4	3
(Kazakhstan) Dmitry Popko	3	7	4
(Latvia) Ernests Gulbis	6	5	6
(United States) Christopher Eubanks	4	7^{8}	5
(Serbia) Viktor Troicki	6	6^{6}	7
(Australia) Aleksandar Vukic	1	1
22	(United States) Brandon Nakashima	6	6

Second round
3	(Slovakia) Andrej Martin	1	2
(Latvia) Ernests Gulbis	6	6
(Serbia) Viktor Troicki	2	7	3
22	(United States) Brandon Nakashima	6	5	6

Qualifying competition
(Latvia) Ernests Gulbis	4	2	1
22	(United States) Brandon Nakashima	6	6	6

=== Fourth qualifier ===
First round
4	(Argentina) Francisco Cerúndolo	6	6
(Brazil) Felipe Meligeni Alves	4	2
PR	(Italy) Filippo Baldi	3	5
(Italy) Roberto Marcora	6	7
(Chile) Alejandro Tabilo	6	6
(France) Alexandre Müller	2	4
(China) Zhang Zhizhen	6	6
18	(Peru) Juan Pablo Varillas	1	1

Second round
4	(Argentina) Francisco Cerúndolo	3	6	6
(Italy) Roberto Marcora	6	3	2
(Chile) Alejandro Tabilo	6^{5}	6^{5}
(China) Zhang Zhizhen	7^{7}	7^{7}

Qualifying competition
4	(Argentina) Francisco Cerúndolo	0	3	7^{7}	6^{6}
(China) Zhang Zhizhen	6	6	6^{4}	7^{8}

=== Fifth qualifier ===
First round
5	(Japan) Yasutaka Uchiyama	3	6	6
WC	(United Kingdom) Ryan Peniston	6	2	4
WC	(United Kingdom) Stuart Parker	4	6	5
PR	(Israel) Dudi Sela	6	3	7
(Ecuador) Emilio Gómez	1	6	3
(France) Maxime Janvier	6	3	6
(Germany) Oscar Otte	6	6
21	(Switzerland) Henri Laaksonen	4	4

Second round
5	(Japan) Yasutaka Uchiyama	6^{4}	7	6
PR	(Israel) Dudi Sela	7^{7}	5	4
(France) Maxime Janvier	5	3
(Germany) Oscar Otte	7	6

Qualifying competition
5	(Japan) Yasutaka Uchiyama	6^{6}	3	3
(Germany) Oscar Otte	7^{8}	6	6

=== Sixth qualifier ===
First round
6	(United States) Denis Kudla	6	6
(Italy) Andrea Pellegrino	4	2
(Poland) Kacper Żuk	6	6
(Czech Republic) Lukáš Rosol	3	3
(Russia) Roman Safiullin	6	6
(Croatia) Ivo Karlović	3	4
(Slovenia) Blaž Rola	4	4
25	(Italy) Federico Gaio	6	6

Second round
6	(United States) Denis Kudla	7^{7}	6
(Poland) Kacper Żuk	6^{1}	4
(Russia) Roman Safiullin	6	2	3
25	(Italy) Federico Gaio	3	6	6

Qualifying competition
6	(United States) Denis Kudla	6	7	6
25	(Italy) Federico Gaio	2	5	4

=== Seventh qualifier ===
First round
7	(France) Arthur Rinderknech	3	7	6
(France) Mathias Bourgue	6	5	2
(Brazil) João Menezes	4	3
WC	(United Kingdom) Jack Pinnington Jones	6	6
(Slovakia) Martin Kližan	1	2
(Czech Republic) Zdeněk Kolář	6	6
(Slovakia) Lukáš Lacko	4	4
28	(Serbia) Nikola Milojević	6	6

Second round
7	(France) Arthur Rinderknech	6	6
WC	(United Kingdom) Jack Pinnington Jones	3	2
(Czech Republic) Zdeněk Kolář	4	3
28	(Serbia) Nikola Milojević	6	6

Qualifying competition
7	(France) Arthur Rinderknech	7^{7}	6	6
28	(Serbia) Nikola Milojević	6^{5}	4	2

=== Eighth qualifier ===
First round
8	(Netherlands) Tallon Griekspoor	7^{10}	6^{6}	7
(Italy) Thomas Fabbiano	6^{8}	7^{8}	5
(France) Hugo Gaston	6	2	4
WC	(Japan) Shintaro Mochizuki	1	6	6
(Australia) Matthew Ebden	6^{3}	6	6
(Argentina) Sebastián Báez	7^{7}	3	2
WC	(United Kingdom) Arthur Fery	6	7^{7}
29	(India) Prajnesh Gunneswaran	1	6^{5}

Second round
8	(Netherlands) Tallon Griekspoor	6	6
WC	(Japan) Shintaro Mochizuki	0	1
(Australia) Matthew Ebden	3	7^{7}	5
WC	(United Kingdom) Arthur Fery	6	6^{3}	7

Qualifying competition
8	(Netherlands) Tallon Griekspoor	4	3	7^{7}	7^{7}	6
WC	(United Kingdom) Arthur Fery	6	6	6^{5}	6^{5}	2

=== Ninth qualifier ===
First round
9	(France) Benjamin Bonzi	7	6
(Argentina) Juan Pablo Ficovich	5	1
(Germany) Daniel Altmaier	6	6
(Germany) Maximilian Marterer	2	4
(Egypt) Mohamed Safwat	7	3	7
(Denmark) Mikael Torpegaard	5	6	5
(Portugal) Frederico Ferreira Silva	7	6
24	(Russia) Evgeny Donskoy	5	3

Second round
9	(France) Benjamin Bonzi	6	6
(Germany) Daniel Altmaier	4	3
(Egypt) Mohamed Safwat	5	3
(Portugal) Frederico Ferreira Silva	7	6

Qualifying competition
9	(France) Benjamin Bonzi	6^{4}	6	6	7
(Portugal) Frederico Ferreira Silva	7^{7}	4	4	5

=== Tenth qualifier ===
First round
10	(Spain) Bernabé Zapata Miralles	7^{7}	6
(Italy) Alessandro Giannessi	6^{5}	3
(Australia) Bernard Tomic	4	6	6
(Slovenia) Blaž Kavčič	6	4	3
WC	(United Kingdom) Anton Matusevich	4	6	6
WC	(United Kingdom) William Jansen	6	0	4
(Argentina) Andrea Collarini	4	2
19	(Spain) Carlos Taberner	6	6

Second round
10	(Spain) Bernabé Zapata Miralles	6	6
(Australia) Bernard Tomic	4	1
WC	(United Kingdom) Anton Matusevich	6	6
19	(Spain) Carlos Taberner	4	1

Qualifying competition
10	(Spain) Bernabé Zapata Miralles	6	3	7^{7}	6^{6}	6
WC	(United Kingdom) Anton Matusevich	2	6	6^{3}	7^{8}	3

=== Eleventh qualifier ===
First round
11	(Brazil) Thiago Seyboth Wild	6	6
(Germany) Tobias Kamke	4	4
(Argentina) Leonardo Mayer	4	2
(Argentina) Marco Trungelliti	6	6
(France) Constant Lestienne	7^{7}	6^{4}	2
(Turkey) Altuğ Çelikbilek	6^{2}	7^{7}	6
(Italy) Paolo Lorenzi	5	3
23	(Netherlands) Botic van de Zandschulp	7	6

Second round
11	(Brazil) Thiago Seyboth Wild	3	7^{7}	5
(Argentina) Marco Trungelliti	6	6^{3}	7
(Turkey) Altuğ Çelikbilek	2	3
23	(Netherlands) Botic van de Zandschulp	6	6

Qualifying competition
(Argentina) Marco Trungelliti	6	4	7^{7}	7
23	(Netherlands) Botic van de Zandschulp	3	6	6^{5}	5

=== Twelfth qualifier ===
First round
12	(Bosnia and Herzegovina) Damir Džumhur	6	6
(France) Quentin Halys	4	4
(Slovakia) Alex Molčan	2	7	8
(United States) Ernesto Escobedo	6	5	6
(Romania) Marius Copil	6	6
(Bulgaria) Dimitar Kuzmanov	4	3
(United States) Thai-Son Kwiatkowski	6	3	4
31	(France) Antoine Hoang	3	6	6

Second round
12	(Bosnia and Herzegovina) Damir Džumhur	2	6^{2}
(Slovakia) Alex Molčan	6	7^{7}
(Romania) Marius Copil	6^{5}	6	5
31	(France) Antoine Hoang	7^{7}	4	7

Qualifying competition
(Slovakia) Alex Molčan	6	6	4	4	5
31	(France) Antoine Hoang	1	4	6	6	7

=== Thirteenth qualifier ===
First round
13	(Slovakia) Jozef Kovalík	3	0
(India) Ramkumar Ramanathan	6	6
(Argentina) Tomás Martín Etcheverry	6	6
(Turkey) Cem İlkel	1	4
(Serbia) Danilo Petrović	5	6^{6}
WC	(United Kingdom) Felix Gill	7	7^{8}
(Croatia) Borna Gojo	3	3
32	(Australia) Marc Polmans	6	6

Second round
(India) Ramkumar Ramanathan	6	6
(Argentina) Tomás Martín Etcheverry	3	4
WC	(United Kingdom) Felix Gill	6^{8}	2
32	(Australia) Marc Polmans	7^{10}	6

Qualifying competition
(India) Ramkumar Ramanathan	3	6	6^{2}	6	9
32	(Australia) Marc Polmans	6	3	7^{7}	3	11

=== Fourteenth qualifier ===
First round
14	(Bolivia) Hugo Dellien	6	6
WC	(United Kingdom) Aidan McHugh	2	1
(Portugal) João Domingues	1	2
(Germany) Daniel Masur	6	6
PR	(Russia) Andrey Kuznetsov	6	6^{5}	6
(Spain) Mario Vilella Martínez	4	7^{7}	2
(Austria) Sebastian Ofner	6	6
20	(Germany) Cedrik-Marcel Stebe	2	3

Second round
14	(Bolivia) Hugo Dellien	3	6^{4}
(Germany) Daniel Masur	6	7^{7}
PR	(Russia) Andrey Kuznetsov	3	5
(Austria) Sebastian Ofner	6	7

Qualifying competition
(Germany) Daniel Masur	6	6	5	6
(Austria) Sebastian Ofner	3	3	7	1

=== Fifteenth qualifier ===
First round
15	(France) Grégoire Barrère	2	6	6
(United States) Bjorn Fratangelo	6	3	4
(Ukraine) Sergiy Stakhovsky	6	7^{13}
(Japan) Go Soeda	3	6^{11}
(Sweden) Elias Ymer	3	4
(Japan) Tatsuma Ito	6	6
(Chinese Taipei) Jason Jung	6	7^{7}
17	(Germany) Peter Gojowczyk	3	6^{4}

Second round
15	(France) Grégoire Barrère	7	6
(Ukraine) Sergiy Stakhovsky	5	3
(Japan) Tatsuma Ito	2	1
(Chinese Taipei) Jason Jung	6	6

Qualifying competition
15	(France) Grégoire Barrère	7^{7}	3	7^{7}	6
(Chinese Taipei) Jason Jung	6^{5}	6	6^{4}	2

=== Sixteenth qualifier ===
First round
16	(Australia) Christopher O'Connell	3	6	9
(Slovakia) Filip Horanský	6	1	7
(Belgium) Ruben Bemelmans	6	7
(Argentina) Renzo Olivo	2	5
(Canada) Steven Diez	3	6	3
(Canada) Brayden Schnur	6	2	6
(Spain) Tommy Robredo	5	6	8
27	(Czech Republic) Tomáš Macháč	7	4	10

Second round
16	(Australia) Christopher O'Connell	6^{3}	6	7
(Belgium) Ruben Bemelmans	7^{7}	3	5
(Canada) Brayden Schnur	6^{4}	0
27	(Czech Republic) Tomáš Macháč	7^{7}	6

Qualifying competition
16	(Australia) Christopher O'Connell	7^{8}	6	7^{7}
27	(Czech Republic) Tomáš Macháč	6^{6}	4	6^{4}
