= Ozan Baris =

American tennis player (born 2004)

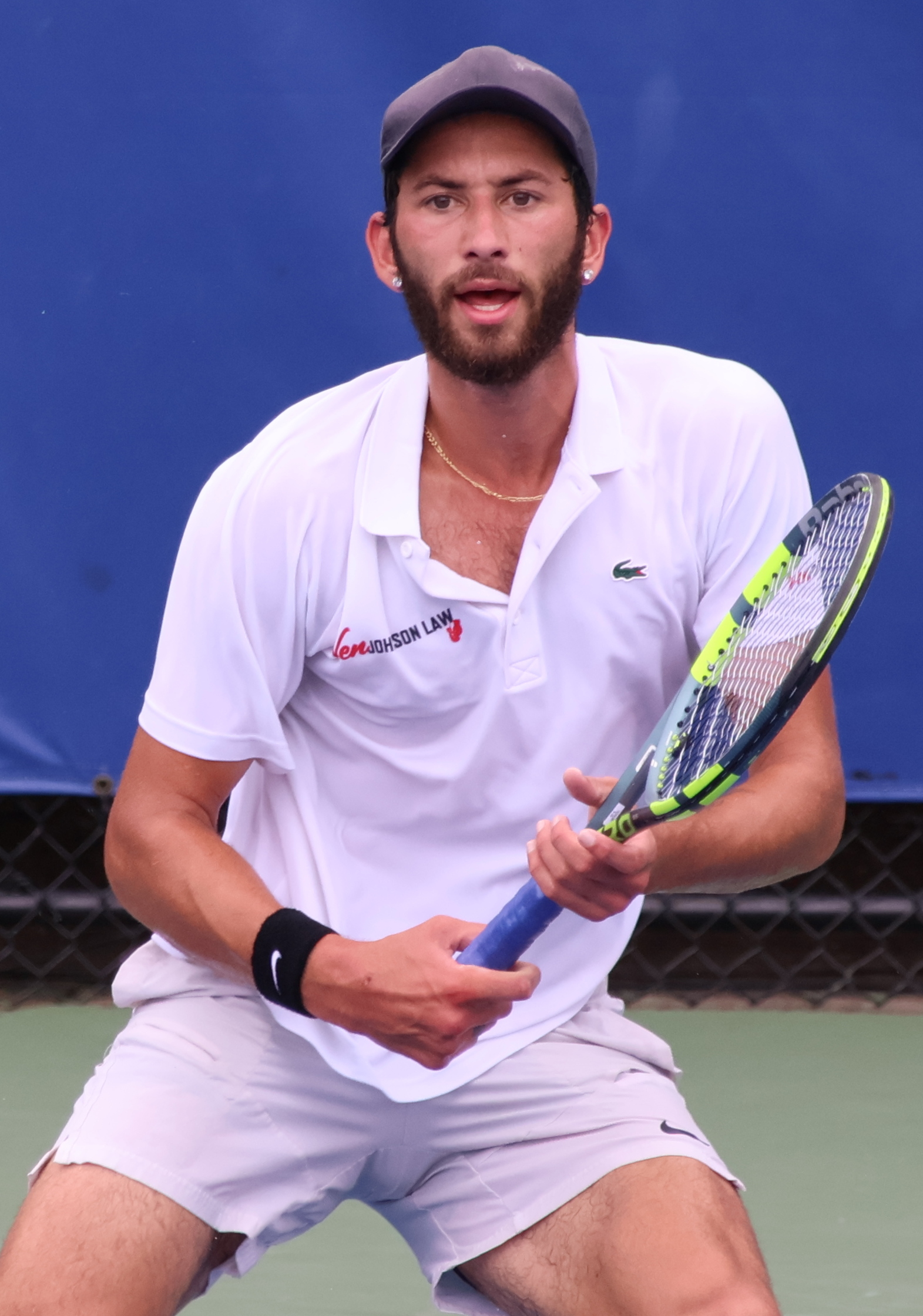
- Baris in 2026
- Full name: Ozan Baris Colak
- Country (sports): United States
- Born: March 31, 2004 (age 22) Kalamazoo, Michigan, United States
- Height: 6 ft 1 in (1.85 m)
- Plays: Right-handed (two-handed backhand)
- College: Michigan State University
- Coach: Mike Flowers
- Prize money: US $66,570

Singles
- Career record: 0–0 (at ATP Tour level, Grand Slam level, and in Davis Cup)
- Career titles: 1 ITF
- Highest ranking: No. 397 (November 2, 2026)
- Current ranking: No. 397 (November 2, 2026)

Grand Slam singles results
- Australian Open Junior: QF (2022)
- French Open Junior: 2R (2022)
- Wimbledon Junior: 3R (2021)
- US Open Junior: 2R (2022)

Doubles
- Career record: 0–0 (at ATP Tour level, Grand Slam level, and in Davis Cup)
- Career titles: 4 ITF
- Highest ranking: No. 521 (August 19, 2024)
- Current ranking: No. 658 (November 2, 2026)

Grand Slam doubles results
- Australian Open Junior: QF (2022)
- French Open Junior: QF (2021, 2022)
- Wimbledon Junior: 2R (2021, 2022)
- US Open Junior: W (2022)
- Last updated on: November 2, 2026.

Ozan Baris (born March 31, 2004), previously known as Ozan Colak, is an American tennis player. Baris has a career high ATP singles ranking of No. 397 achieved on November 2, 2026 and a career high ATP doubles ranking of No. 521 achieved on August 19, 2024.

Baris played on the ITF Junior Circuit until the end of 2022. His best singles result in Grand Slam tournaments was reaching the quarterfinals in the 2022 Australian Open – Boys' singles. In his last tournament as a junior, Baris won the 2022 US Open – Boys' doubles title with Nishesh Basavareddy. Baris plays college tennis at Michigan State University.

== Personal life ==
Baris is of Turkish descent.

== ATP Challenger and ITF World Tennis Tour finals ==
=== Singles: 3 (2 titles, 1 runner-up) ===
| Legend ATP Challenger Tour (0–0) ITF World Tennis Tour (2–1) | Finals by surface Hard (2–1) Clay (0–0) Grass (0–0) Carpet (0–0) |

| Result | W–L | Date | Tournament | Tier | Surface | Opponent | Score |
|---|---|---|---|---|---|---|---|
| Loss | 0–1 | Jun 2023 | M25 Wichita, USA | World Tennis Tour | Hard | (United States) Ethan Quinn | 3–6, 5–7 |
| Win | 1–1 | Nov 2023 | M15 East Lansing, USA | World Tennis Tour | Hard | (United States) Samir Banerjee | 6–2, 6–1 |
| Win | 2–1 | Jun 2026 | M25 Wichita, USA | World Tennis Tour | Hard | (United States) Sebastian Gorzny | 7–6^{(7–5)}, 6–4 |

=== Doubles: 6 (4 titles, 2 runner-ups) ===
| Legend ATP Challenger Tour (0–1) ITF World Tennis Tour (4–1) | Finals by surface Hard (4–2) Clay (0–0) Grass (0–0) |

| Result | W–L | Date | Tournament | Tier | Surface | Partner | Opponent | Score |
|---|---|---|---|---|---|---|---|---|
| Loss | 0–1 | Nov 2021 | M15 East Lansing, USA | World Tennis Tour | Hard | (United States) Jackson Winkler | (United States) Chad Kissell (United States) Joshua Sheehy | 4–6, 2–6 |
| Win | 1–1 | Jun 2023 | M25 Wichita, USA | World Tennis Tour | Hard | (United States) Garrett Johns | (United States) Cannon Kingsley (Japan) James Kent Trotter | 7–6^{(7–4)}, 6–3 |
| Win | 2-1 | Jun 2023 | M25 Tulsa, USA | World Tennis Tour | Hard | (United States) Garrett Johns | (United States) Mac Kiger (Canada) Benjamin Sigouin | 6–2, 7–5 |
| Win | 3–1 | Oct 2023 | M25 Harlingen, USA | World Tennis Tour | Hard | (United States) Garrett Johns | (United States) Andres Martin (United States) Keshav Chopra | 6–4, 5–7, [10–8] |
| Loss | 3-2 | Jul 2024 | Cranbrook Tennis Classic, USA | Challenger | Hard | (United States) Nishesh Basavareddy | (United States) Ryan Seggerman (United States) Patrik Trhac | 6-4, 3-6, [2-10] |
| Win | 4-2 | Jun 2025 | M25 Wishita, USA | World Tennis Tour | Hard | (New Zealand) Matthew Shearer | (Australia) Matt Hulme (Australia) Kody Pearson | 7-6^{(7-4)}, 7-6^{(7-4)} |

== Junior Grand Slam titles ==
=== Doubles: 1 (1 title) ===
| Result | Year | Tournament | Surface | Partner | Opponents | Score |
|---|---|---|---|---|---|---|
| Winner | 2022 | US Open | Hard | (United States) Nishesh Basavareddy | (Switzerland) Dylan Dietrich (Bolivia) Juan Carlos Prado Ángelo | 6–1, 6–1 |
