= 2021 French Open – Boys' doubles =

Boys' doubles
- 2021 French Open

Final
- Champions: (France) Arthur Fils (France) Giovanni Mpetshi Perricard
- Runners-up: (Belgium) Martin Katz (Ukraine) German Samofalov
- Score: 7–5, 6–2

Events
| Singles | men | women | | boys | girls |
| Doubles | men | women | mixed | boys | girls |
| WC Singles | men | women | quad |
| WC Doubles | men | women | quad |
| Legends | −45 | 45+ | women |
- French Open

In the 2021 French Open – Boys' doubles, Flavio Cobolli and Dominic Stricker were the defending champions, but both players were no longer eligible to participate in junior events.

Arthur Fils and Giovanni Mpetshi Perricard won the title after defeating Martin Katz and German Samofalov 7–5, 6–2 in the final.

== Seeds ==
1. (Estonia) Mark Lajal / (United Kingdom) Jack Pinnington Jones (second round)
2. (United States) Alexander Bernard / (United States) Dali Blanch (first round)
3. (United States) Jack Anthrop / (China) Shang Juncheng (second round, withdrew)
4. (France) Arthur Fils / (France) Giovanni Mpetshi Perricard (champions)
5. (Sweden) Leo Borg / (Brazil) Pedro Boscardin Dias (first round)
6. (France) Sean Cuenin / (France) Luca Van Assche (first round)
7. (United States) Samir Banerjee / (United States) Ozan Colak (quarterfinals)
8. (Switzerland) Jérôme Kym / (Italy) Luca Nardi (second round, withdrew)

== Draw ==
Key

- Q = Qualifier
- WC = Wild card
- LL = Lucky loser
- Alt = Alternate
- ITF = ITF entry
- PR = Protected ranking
- SR = Special ranking
- SE = Special exempt
- JE = Junior exempt
- JR = Junior Accelerator Programme entrant
- CO = College Accelerator Programme entrant
- NG = Next Gen Accelerator Program entrant
- w/o = Walkover
- r = Retired
- d = Defaulted

=== Finals ===
Semifinals
(Ukraine) Viacheslav Bielinskyi (Bulgaria) Petr Nesterov | 5 | 2
4 | (France) Arthur Fils (France) Giovanni Mpetshi Perricard | 7 | 6
(United States) Victor Lilov (Slovakia) Peter Benjamín Privara | 4 | 6^{6}
(Belgium) Martin Katz (Ukraine) German Samofalov | 6 | 7^{8}

Final
4 | (France) Arthur Fils (France) Giovanni Mpetshi Perricard | 7 | 6
(Belgium) Martin Katz (Ukraine) German Samofalov | 5 | 2

=== Top half ===
First round
1 | (Estonia) Mark Lajal (United Kingdom) Jack Pinnington Jones | 6 | 7^{7}
(Spain) Daniel Rincón (Jordan) Abedallah Shelbayh | 4 | 6^{4}
(Ukraine) Viacheslav Bielinskyi (Bulgaria) Petr Nesterov | 7 | 2 | [10]
(United States) Bruno Kuzuhara (Brazil) João Victor Couto Loureiro | 5 | 6 | [6]
(Israel) Orel Kimhi (Colombia) Johan Alexander Rodríguez Rodríguez | 3 | 2
(France) Sascha Gueymard Wayenburg (France) Mehdi Sadaoui | 6 | 6
(Slovenia) Sebastian Dominko (Russia) Konstantin Zhzhenov | 4 | 6 | [5]
8 | (Switzerland) Jérôme Kym (Italy) Luca Nardi | 6 | 4 | [10]
4 | (France) Arthur Fils (France) Giovanni Mpetshi Perricard | 6 | 7^{7}
(Belgium) Pierre Yves Bailly (France) Max Westphal | 1 | 6^{4}
(Japan) Kokoro Isomura (United Kingdom) Lui Maxted | 5 | 6 | [10]
(Portugal) Miguel Gomes (Spain) Daniel Mérida | 7 | 4 | [8]
WC | (France) Charlélie Cosnet (France) Thibault Verdier | 7 | 4 | [4]
(Czech Republic) Matthew William Donald (Croatia) Mili Poljičak | 5 | 6 | [10]
(Peru) Gonzalo Bueno (Paraguay) Adolfo Daniel Vallejo | 5 | 3
7 | (United States) Samir Banerjee (United States) Ozan Colak | 7 | 6

Second round
1 | (Estonia) M Lajal (United Kingdom) J Pinnington Jones | 4 | 6 | [7]
(Ukraine) V Bielinskyi (Bulgaria) P Nesterov | 6 | 2 | [10]
(France) S Gueymard Wayenburg (France) M Sadaoui | w/o
8 | (Switzerland) J Kym (Italy) L Nardi
4 | (France) A Fils (France) G Mpetshi Perricard | 7 | 6
(Japan) K Isomura (United Kingdom) L Maxted | 5 | 4
(Czech Republic) MW Donald (Croatia) M Poljičak | 3 | 2
7 | (United States) S Banerjee (United States) O Colak | 6 | 6

Quarterfinals
(Ukraine) V Bielinskyi (Bulgaria) P Nesterov | 6 | 5 | [12]
(France) S Gueymard Wayenburg (France) M Sadaoui | 1 | 7 | [10]
4 | (France) A Fils (France) G Mpetshi Perricard | 1 | 6 | [10]
7 | (United States) S Banerjee (United States) O Colak | 6 | 3 | [4]

Semifinals
(Ukraine) V Bielinskyi (Bulgaria) P Nesterov | 5 | 2
4 | (France) A Fils (France) G Mpetshi Perricard | 7 | 6

=== Bottom half ===
First round
5 | (Sweden) Leo Borg (Brazil) Pedro Boscardin Dias | 4 | 6^{3}
(United States) Victor Lilov (Slovakia) Peter Benjamín Privara | 6 | 7^{7}
WC | (France) Paul Inchauspé (France) Théo Papamalamis | 7^{7} | 4 | [10]
(United States) Ethan Quinn (Hong Kong) Coleman Wong | 6^{4} | 6 | [12]
(Sweden) Måns Dahlberg (Czech Republic) Adam Jurajda | 3 | 7 | [10]
(France) Robin Bertrand (Australia) Philip Sekulic | 6 | 5 | [6]
WC | (France) Arthur Géa (France) Loan Lestir | 3 | 6^{3}
3 | (United States) Jack Anthrop (China) Shang Juncheng | 6 | 7^{7}
6 | (France) Sean Cuenin (France) Luca Van Assche | 3 | 6 | [6]
(Ecuador) Álvaro Guillén Meza (Russia) Igor Kudriashov | 6 | 3 | [10]
(Belgium) Martin Katz (Ukraine) German Samofalov | 7^{8} | 6
(Germany) Mika Lipp (Germany) Max Hans Rehberg | 6^{6} | 4
WC | (France) Gabriel Debru (France) Antoine Ghibaudo | 2 | 4
(Poland) Maks Kaśnikowski (Poland) Aleksander Orlikowski | 6 | 6
(Austria) Marko Andrejic (Serbia) Marko Topo | 7 | 4 | [10]
2 | (United States) Alexander Bernard (United States) Dali Blanch | 5 | 6 | [7]

Second round
(United States) V Lilov (Slovakia) PB Privara | 3 | 6 | [10]
(United States) E Quinn (Hong Kong) C Wong | 6 | 4 | [6]
(Sweden) M Dahlberg (Czech Republic) A Jurajda | w/o
3 | (United States) J Anthrop (China) J Shang
(Ecuador) A Guillén Meza (Russia) I Kudriashov | 4 | 3
(Belgium) M Katz (Ukraine) G Samofalov | 6 | 6
(Poland) M Kaśnikowski (Poland) A Orlikowski | 7 | 2 | [10]
(Austria) M Andrejic (Serbia) M Topo | 5 | 6 | [2]

Quarterfinals
(United States) V Lilov (Slovakia) PB Privara | 6 | 6
(Sweden) M Dahlberg (Czech Republic) A Jurajda | 2 | 4
(Belgium) M Katz (Ukraine) G Samofalov | 6^{6} | 6 | [10]
(Poland) M Kaśnikowski (Poland) A Orlikowski | 7^{8} | 4 | [7]

Semifinals
(United States) V Lilov (Slovakia) PB Privara | 4 | 6^{6}
(Belgium) M Katz (Ukraine) G Samofalov | 6 | 7^{8}
