= Samir Banerjee =

American tennis player (born 2003)

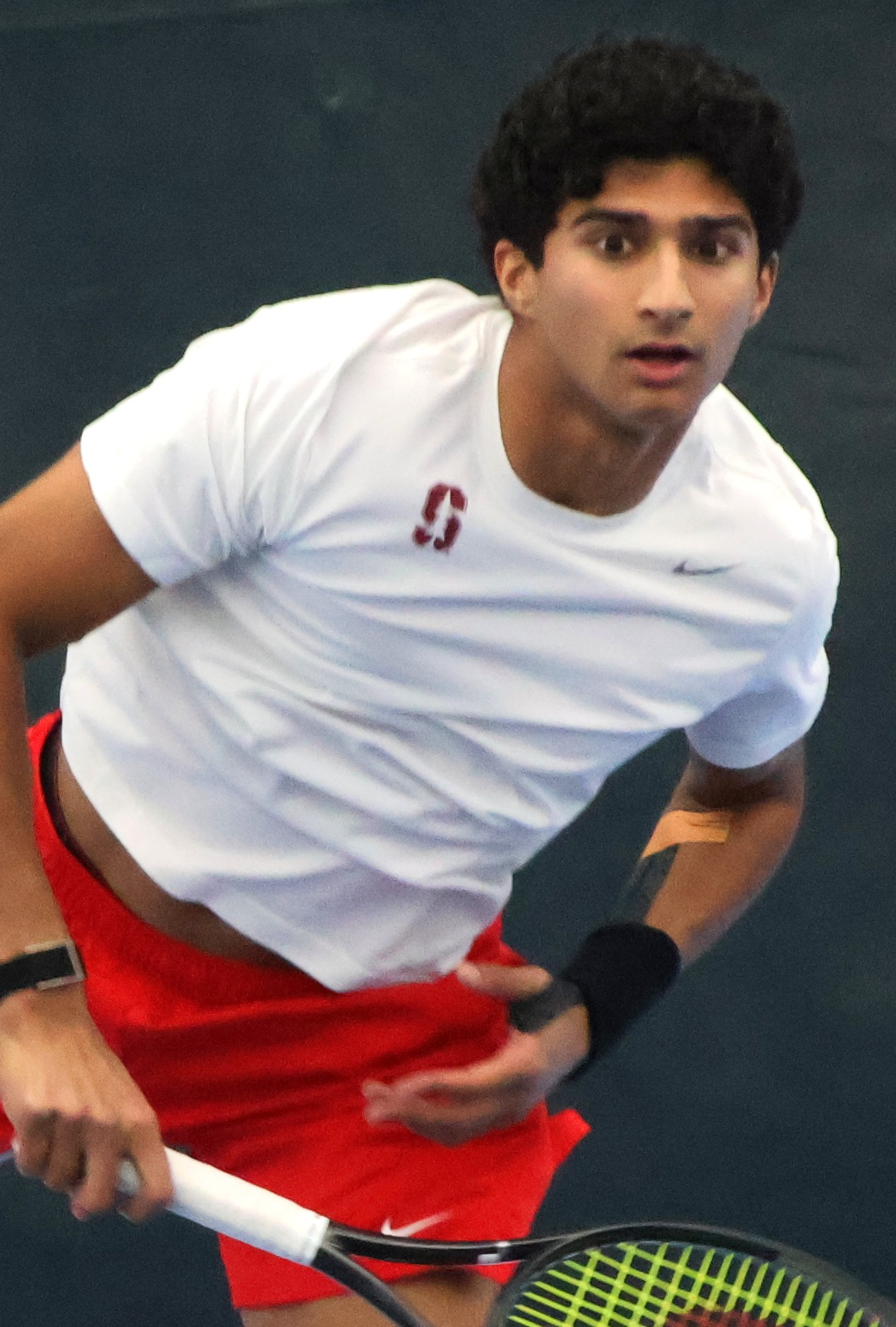
- Banerjee with Stanford in 2026
- Country (sports): United States
- Born: October 2, 2003 (age 23) Morristown, New Jersey, United States
- Height: 6 ft 2 in (1.88 m)
- Plays: Right-handed (two-handed backhand)
- College: Stanford University
- Prize money: US $81,944

Singles
- Career record: 0–0
- Career titles: 0
- Highest ranking: No. 347 (November 3, 2025)
- Current ranking: No. 650 (October 19, 2026)

Grand Slam singles results
- US Open: Q1 (2021)
- French Open Junior: 1R (2021)
- Wimbledon Junior: W (2021)
- US Open Junior: QF (2021)

Doubles
- Career record: 0–0
- Career titles: 0
- Highest ranking: No. 800 (September 8, 2025)
- Current ranking: No. 1,556 (October 19, 2026)

Grand Slam doubles results
- French Open Junior: QF (2021)
- Wimbledon Junior: SF (2021)
- US Open Junior: 2R (2021)
- Last updated on: October 19, 2026.

Samir Banerjee (Bengali: সমীর বন্দ্যোপাধ্যায়; born October 2, 2003) is an American tennis player. He has a career-high ATP singles ranking of world No. 347 achieved on November 3, 2025 and a career-high ATP doubles ranking of world No. 800 achieved on September 8, 2025.

He won the 2021 Junior Wimbledon title and reached the quarterfinals at the 2021 Junior US Open. Banerjee had a career high ITF junior combined ranking of No. 2 achieved on 12 July 2021.

== Personal life ==
Banerjee started playing tennis at the age of 6. Banarjee attended Ridge High School and reached the NJSIAA singles semifinals in his freshman season.

Banerjee was admitted at Stanford University in 2022 and attended as freshman in 2022-23, as sophomore 2023-24 and as a junior in 2024-25.

== ATP Challenger and ITF World Tennis Tour finals ==
=== Singles: 6 (3–3) ===
| Legend ATP Challenger Tour (0–0) ITF World Tennis Tour (3–3) | Finals by surface Hard (3–3) Clay (0–0) Grass (0–0) Carpet (0–0) |

| Result | W–L | Date | Tournament | Tier | Surface | Opponent | Score |
|---|---|---|---|---|---|---|---|
| Loss | 0–1 | Nov 2023 | M15 East Lansing, USA | World Tennis Tour | Hard | (United States) Ozan Baris | 2–6, 1–6 |
| Win | 1–1 | Sep 2024 | M15 Singapore, Singapore | World Tennis Tour | Hard | (Japan) Tomohiro Masabayashi | 6–1, 6–3 |
| Loss | 1–2 | Jan 2025 | M25 Indore, India | World Tennis Tour | Hard | (United Kingdom) Alastair Gray | 3–6, 1–1 ret. |
| Win | 2–2 | Jul 2025 | M25 Dallas, United States | World Tennis Tour | Hard | (United States) Alex Rybakov | 5–7, 6–1, 6–4 |
| Win | 3–2 | Aug 2025 | M25 Trelew, Argentina | World Tennis Tour | Hard | (Argentina) Gonzalo Villanueva | 6–1, 6–2 |
| Loss | 3–3 | Sep 2026 | M25 Plaisir, France | World Tennis Tour | Hard | (France) Clément Chidekh | 6–7^{(5–7)}, 1–6 |

=== Doubles: 3 (2–1) ===
| Legend ATP Challenger Tour (0–0) ITF World Tennis Tour (2–1) | Finals by surface Hard (2–1) Clay (0–0) Grass (0–0) Carpet (0–0) |

| Result | W–L | Date | Tournament | Tier | Surface | Partner | Opponent | Score |
|---|---|---|---|---|---|---|---|---|
| Loss | 0–1 | Sep 2023 | M15 Monastir, Tunisia | World Tennis Tour | Hard | (India) Chirag Duhan | (Germany) Niklas Schell (United Kingdom) Oscar Weightman | 3–6, 2–6 |
| Win | 1–1 | Jul 2025 | M25 Dallas, United States | World Tennis Tour | Hard | (United States) Bruno Kuzuhara | (Japan) Kosuke Ogura (Japan) Leo Vithoontien | 6–4, 6–3 |
| Win | 2–1 | Aug 2025 | M25 Trelew, Argentina | World Tennis Tour | Hard | (United States) Noah Schachter | (Argentina) Valentin Basel (Argentina) Franco Ribero | 6–4, 6–4 |

== Junior Grand Slam finals ==
=== Singles: 1 (1 title) ===
| Result | Year | Tournament | Surface | Opponent | Score |
|---|---|---|---|---|---|
| Win | 2021 | Wimbledon | Grass | (United States) Victor Lilov | 7–5, 6–3 |
