= Victor Lilov =

American tennis player

- Country (sports): United States
- Residence: Raleigh, North Carolina, U.S.
- Born: 11 February 2004 (age 22) London, Ontario, Canada
- Height: 1.83 m (6 ft 0 in)
- Plays: Right-handed (two-handed backhand)
- Coach: Stanford Boster
- Prize money: $53,939

Singles
- Career record: 0–0 (at ATP Tour level, Grand Slam level, and in Davis Cup)
- Career titles: 0
- Highest ranking: No. 497 (13 November 2023)
- Current ranking: No. 867 (6 April 2026)

Grand Slam singles results
- French Open Junior: 3R (2021)
- Wimbledon Junior: F (2021)
- US Open Junior: QF (2021)

Doubles
- Career record: 0–0 (at ATP Tour level, Grand Slam level, and in Davis Cup)
- Career titles: 0
- Highest ranking: No. 734 (17 April 2023)
- Current ranking: No. 1,334 (6 April 2026)

Grand Slam doubles results
- French Open Junior: SF (2021)
- Wimbledon Junior: QF (2021)
- US Open Junior: QF (2021)
- Last updated on: 7 April 2026.

Victor Lilov (born 11 February 2004) is an American tennis player. Lilov has a career high ATP singles ranking of World No. 497 achieved on 13 November 2023 and a doubles ranking of No. 734 achieved on 17 April 2023.

On the junior tour, Lilov has a career high ITF junior combined ranking of World No. 3, achieved on 3 January 2022. He reached the final of the 2021 Wimbledon Championships boys' singles, losing to Samir Banerjee in the final.

== ATP Challenger and ITF World Tennis Tour finals ==
=== Singles: 6 (1–5) ===
Legend (singles) ATP Challenger Tour (0–0) ITF WTT (1–5)	Finals by surface Hard (0–2) Clay (1–3) Grass (0–0) Carpet (0–0)

Result	W–L	Date	Tournament	Tier	Surface	Opponent	Score
Loss	0–1	Oct 2021	M15 Cancún, Mexico	WTT	Hard	(Argentina) Matías Franco Descotte	5–7, 4–6
Win	1–1	Nov 2022	M15 Lima, Peru	WTT	Clay	(Peru) Jorge Panta	2–6, 6–3, 6–1
Loss	1–2	Apr 2023	M15 Tacarigua, Trinidad and Tobago	WTT	Hard	(United States) Ezekiel Clark	6–3, 2–6, 5–7
Loss	1–3	Oct 2023	M25 Zapopan, Mexico	WTT	Clay	(Peru) Ignacio Buse	3–6, 6–7^{(1–7)}
Loss	1–4	Apr 2024	M15 Vero Beach, USA	WTT	Clay	(United States) Garrett Johns	6–7^{(1–7)}, 2–6
Loss	1–5	May 2025	M15 Orlando, USA	WTT	Clay	(Canada) Kuang Qing Xu	6–7^{(3–7)}, 6–2, 2–6

=== Doubles: 3 (2–1) ===
Legend (doubles) ATP Challenger Tour (0–0) ITF WTT (2–1)	Titles by surface Hard (1–0) Clay (1–1) Grass (0–0) Carpet (0–0)

Result	W–L	Date	Tournament	Tier	Surface	Partner	Opponents	Score
Win	1–0	May 2022	M15 Antalya, Turkey	WTT	Clay	(United States) Bruno Kuzuhara	(Poland) Maks Kaśnikowski (Switzerland) Jérôme Kym	Walkover
Win	2–0	Sep 2022	M15 Cancún, Mexico	WTT	Hard	(France) Paul Inchauspé	(Israel) Ron Ellouck (Israel) Orel Kimhi	6–3, 6–4
Loss	2–1	Apr 2023	M15 Santo Domingo de los Tsáchilas, Ecuador	WTT	Clay	(Brazil) Mateo Barreiros Reyes	(Canada) Juan Carlos Aguilar (United States) Ezekiel Clark	1–6, 5–7

== Junior Grand Slam finals ==
=== Singles: 1 (1 runner-up) ===
Result	Year	Tournament	Surface	Opponent	Score
Loss	2021	Wimbledon	Grass	(United States) Samir Banerjee	5–7, 3–6
