= 2021 Wimbledon Championships – Mixed doubles =

Mixed doubles
- 2021 Wimbledon Championships

Final
- Champions: (United Kingdom) Neal Skupski (United States) Desirae Krawczyk
- Runners-up: (United Kingdom) Joe Salisbury (United Kingdom) Harriet Dart
- Score: 6–2, 7–6^{(7–1)}

Details
- Draw: 48
- Seeds: 16

Events
| Singles | men | women | | boys | girls |
| Doubles | men | women | mixed | boys | girls |
| WC Singles | men | women | quad | boys | girls |
| WC Doubles | men | women | quad | boys | girls |
- Wimbledon Championships

Neal Skupski and Desirae Krawczyk defeated Joe Salisbury and Harriet Dart in the final, 6–2, 7–6^{(7–1)}, to win the mixed doubles tennis title at the 2021 Wimbledon Championships. It was Krawczyk's second consecutive major title in mixed doubles, following her success at the French Open.

Ivan Dodig and Latisha Chan were the defending champions from when the tournament was last held in 2019, but lost in the third round to John Peers and Zhang Shuai.

== Seeds ==
All seeds received a bye into the second round.

1. (France) Nicolas Mahut / (France) Kristina Mladenovic (withdrew)
2. (Croatia) Mate Pavić / (Canada) Gabriela Dabrowski (quarterfinals)
3. (Netherlands) Wesley Koolhof / (Netherlands) Demi Schuurs (second round)
4. (France) Édouard Roger-Vasselin / (United States) Nicole Melichar (quarterfinals)
5. (United States) Rajeev Ram / (United States) Bethanie Mattek-Sands (third round, withdrew)
6. (Croatia) Ivan Dodig / (Chinese Taipei) Latisha Chan (third round)
7. (United Kingdom) Neal Skupski / (United States) Desirae Krawczyk (champions)
8. (New Zealand) Michael Venus / (Chinese Taipei) Chan Hao-ching (withdrew)

9. (Germany) Kevin Krawietz / (Czech Republic) Květa Peschke (semifinals)
10. (South Africa) Raven Klaasen / (Croatia) Darija Jurak (third round)
11. (Monaco) Hugo Nys / (Chinese Taipei) Hsieh Su-wei (withdrew)
12. (France) Fabrice Martin / (Chile) Alexa Guarachi (second round)
13. (Belgium) Sander Gillé / (United States) Hayley Carter (third round)
14. (Netherlands) Jean-Julien Rojer / (Slovenia) Andreja Klepač (quarterfinals)
15. (Japan) Ben McLachlan / (Japan) Ena Shibahara (withdrew)
16. (New Zealand) Marcus Daniell / (Canada) Sharon Fichman (withdrew)
17. (Australia) John Peers / (China) Zhang Shuai (semifinals)

Click on the seed number of a player to go to their draw section.

== Draw ==
Key

- Q = Qualifier
- WC = Wild card
- LL = Lucky loser
- Alt = Alternate
- ITF = ITF entry
- PR = Protected ranking
- SR = Special ranking
- SE = Special exempt
- JE = Junior exempt
- JR = Junior Accelerator Programme entrant
- CO = College Accelerator Programme entrant
- NG = Next Gen Accelerator Program entrant
- w/o = Walkover
- r = Retired
- d = Defaulted

=== Finals ===
Quarterfinals
14 | (Netherlands) Jean-Julien Rojer (Slovenia) Andreja Klepač | 6^{6} | 2
7 | (United Kingdom) Neal Skupski (United States) Desirae Krawczyk | 7^{8} | 6
4 | (France) Édouard Roger-Vasselin (United States) Nicole Melichar | 2 | 4
17 | (Australia) John Peers (China) Zhang Shuai | 6 | 6
WC | (France) Jérémy Chardy (United Kingdom) Naomi Broady | 6 | 4 | 5
(United Kingdom) Joe Salisbury (United Kingdom) Harriet Dart | 4 | 6 | 7
9 | (Germany) Kevin Krawietz (Czech Republic) Květa Peschke | 6 | 6^{3} | 9
2 | (Croatia) Mate Pavić (Canada) Gabriela Dabrowski | 3 | 7^{7} | 7

Semifinals
7 | (United Kingdom) Neal Skupski (United States) Desirae Krawczyk | 3 | 7^{7} | 7
17 | (Australia) John Peers (China) Zhang Shuai | 6 | 6^{4} | 5
(United Kingdom) Joe Salisbury (United Kingdom) Harriet Dart | 6 | 4 | 6
9 | (Germany) Kevin Krawietz (Czech Republic) Květa Peschke | 2 | 6 | 4

Final
7 | (United Kingdom) Neal Skupski (United States) Desirae Krawczyk | 6 | 7^{7}
(United Kingdom) Joe Salisbury (United Kingdom) Harriet Dart | 2 | 6^{1}

=== Top half ===
==== Section 1 ====
First round
PR | (India) R Bopanna (India) S Mirza | 6 | 7^{7}
Alt | (India) R Ramanathan (India) A Raina | 2 | 6^{5}
(Israel) J Erlich (Czech Republic) L Hradecká | 7^{7} | 6^{5} | 4
PR | (Ecuador) G Escobar (Russia) V Zvonareva | 6^{5} | 7^{7} | 6
(United Kingdom) K Skupski (United States) J Pegula | 1 | 7 | 5
Alt | (United Kingdom) A Fery (United Kingdom) T Moore | 6 | 5 | 7
WC | (United Kingdom) L Glasspool (United Kingdom) J Burrage
(United Kingdom) L Bambridge (United States) A Muhammad | w/o

Second round
Alt | (United Kingdom) A McHugh (United Kingdom) E Webley-Smith | 3 | 1
PR | (India) R Bopanna (India) S Mirza | 6 | 6
PR | (Ecuador) G Escobar (Russia) V Zvonareva | 6^{5} | 4
14 | (Netherlands) J-J Rojer (Slovenia) A Klepač | 7^{7} | 6
12 | (France) F Martin (Chile) A Guarachi | 3 | 3
Alt | (United Kingdom) A Fery (United Kingdom) T Moore | 6 | 6
(United Kingdom) L Bambridge (United States) A Muhammad | 3 | 6^{7}
7 | (United Kingdom) N Skupski (United States) D Krawczyk | 6 | 7^{9}

Third round
PR | (India) R Bopanna (India) S Mirza | 3 | 6 | 9
14 | (Netherlands) J-J Rojer (Slovenia) A Klepač | 6 | 3 | 11
Alt | (United Kingdom) A Fery (United Kingdom) T Moore | 6^{5} | 3
7 | (United Kingdom) N Skupski (United States) D Krawczyk | 7^{7} | 6

Quarterfinals
14 | (Netherlands) J-J Rojer (Slovenia) A Klepač | 6^{6} | 2
7 | (United Kingdom) N Skupski (United States) D Krawczyk | 7^{8} | 6

==== Section 2 ====
First round
(United States) A Krajicek (United States) S Santamaria | 3 | 6 | 5
WC | (Australia) N Kyrgios (United States) V Williams | 6 | 3 | 7
(Australia) J-P Smith (United States) C McNally | 2 | 3
(Belarus) A Vasilevski (Australia) Ar Rodionova | 6 | 6
(Czech Republic) R Jebavý (Czech Republic) M Vondroušová | 6 | 3 | 6
Alt | (Germany) A Begemann (Germany) V Heisen | 4 | 6 | 3
(Pakistan) A-u-H Qureshi (Ukraine) N Kichenok | w/o
(Kazakhstan) A Bublik (Russia) A Pavlyuchenkova

Second round
4 | (France) É Roger-Vasselin (United States) N Melichar | w/o
WC | (Australia) N Kyrgios (United States) V Williams
(Belarus) A Vasilevski (Australia) Ar Rodionova | w/o
Alt | Bye
17 | (Australia) J Peers (China) S Zhang | 6 | 6
(Czech Republic) R Jebavý (Czech Republic) M Vondroušová | 2 | 3
(Pakistan) A-u-H Qureshi (Ukraine) N Kichenok | 6^{5} | 4
6 | (Croatia) I Dodig (Chinese Taipei) L Chan | 7^{7} | 6

Third round
4 | (France) É Roger-Vasselin (United States) N Melichar | 6 | 4 | 6
(Belarus) A Vasilevski (Australia) Ar Rodionova | 2 | 6 | 4
17 | (Australia) J Peers (China) S Zhang | 6 | 7^{7}
6 | (Croatia) I Dodig (Chinese Taipei) L Chan | 4 | 6^{4}

Quarterfinals
4 | (France) É Roger-Vasselin (United States) N Melichar | 2 | 4
17 | (Australia) J Peers (China) S Zhang | 6 | 6

=== Bottom half ===
==== Section 3 ====
First round
WC | (United Kingdom) R Peniston (United Kingdom) E Silva | 4 | 2
WC | (France) J Chardy (United Kingdom) N Broady | 6 | 6
Alt | (India) D Sharan (United Kingdom) S Murray Sharan | 6 | 5 | 6
PR | (Uruguay) A Behar (Kazakhstan) G Voskoboeva | 3 | 7 | 4
(Austria) O Marach (Ukraine) L Kichenok | 7 | 7
(Mexico) S González (Mexico) G Olmos | 5 | 5
(United Kingdom) J Salisbury (United Kingdom) H Dart | 6 | 7^{7}
(Finland) H Kontinen (United Kingdom) H Watson | 1 | 6^{3}

Second round
bye
WC | (France) J Chardy (United Kingdom) N Broady | w/o
Alt | (India) D Sharan (United Kingdom) S Murray Sharan | 6 | 6^{1} | 3
10 | (South Africa) R Klaasen (Croatia) D Jurak | 3 | 7^{7} | 6
bye
(Austria) O Marach (Ukraine) L Kichenok | w/o
(United Kingdom) J Salisbury (United Kingdom) H Dart | 6 | 1 | 6
3 | (Netherlands) W Koolhof (Netherlands) D Schuurs | 2 | 6 | 4

Third round
WC | (France) J Chardy (United Kingdom) N Broady | 6 | 7
10 | (South Africa) R Klaasen (Croatia) D Jurak | 3 | 5
(Austria) O Marach (Ukraine) L Kichenok | 3 | 7^{7} | 3
(United Kingdom) J Salisbury (United Kingdom) H Dart | 6 | 6^{4} | 6

Quarterfinals
WC | (France) J Chardy (United Kingdom) N Broady | 6 | 4 | 5
(United Kingdom) J Salisbury (United Kingdom) H Dart | 4 | 6 | 7

==== Section 4 ====
First round
(United States) N Monroe (Czech Republic) R Voráčová | 6 | 6
WC | (United Kingdom) J O'Mara (United Kingdom) SB Grey | 4 | 3
PR | (Spain) M López (Czech Republic) M Bouzková | 3 | 4
(Australia) M Purcell (Ukraine) M Kostyuk | 6 | 6
(Brazil) M Demoliner (Brazil) L Stefani | 6 | 6
Alt | (Netherlands) D Pel (Netherlands) R van der Hoek | 3 | 2
(Netherlands) M Middelkoop (Netherlands) K Bertens | 6^{3} | 7 | 3
(Australia) M Ebden (Australia) S Stosur | 7^{7} | 5 | 6

Second round
5 | (United States) R Ram (United States) B Mattek-Sands | 6 | 3 | 6
(United States) N Monroe (Czech Republic) R Voráčová | 3 | 6 | 4
(Australia) M Purcell (Ukraine) M Kostyuk
9 | (Germany) K Krawietz (Czech Republic) K Peschke | w/o
13 | (Belgium) S Gillé (United States) H Carter | 6 | 3 | 6
(Brazil) M Demoliner (Brazil) L Stefani | 2 | 6 | 3
(Australia) M Ebden (Australia) S Stosur | 5 | 6^{8}
2 | (Croatia) M Pavić (Canada) G Dabrowski | 7 | 7^{10}

Third round
5 | (United States) R Ram (United States) B Mattek-Sands
9 | (Germany) K Krawietz (Czech Republic) K Peschke | w/o
13 | (Belgium) S Gillé (United States) H Carter | 4 | 4
2 | (Croatia) M Pavić (Canada) G Dabrowski | 6 | 6

Quarterfinals
9 | (Germany) K Krawietz (Czech Republic) K Peschke | 6 | 6^{3} | 9
2 | (Croatia) M Pavić (Canada) G Dabrowski | 3 | 7^{7} | 7

== Other entry information ==
=== Wild cards ===
- (France) Jérémy Chardy / (United Kingdom) Naomi Broady
- (United Kingdom) Lloyd Glasspool / (United Kingdom) Jodie Burrage
- (Australia) Nick Kyrgios / (United States) Venus Williams
- (United Kingdom) Jonny O'Mara / (United Kingdom) Sarah Beth Grey
- (United Kingdom) Ryan Peniston / (United Kingdom) Eden Silva

=== Protected ranking ===
- (Uruguay) Ariel Behar / (Kazakhstan) Galina Voskoboeva
- (India) Rohan Bopanna / (India) Sania Mirza
- (Ecuador) Gonzalo Escobar / (Russia) Vera Zvonareva
- (Spain) Marc López / (Czech Republic) Marie Bouzková

=== Alternates ===
- (Germany) Andre Begemann / (Germany) Vivian Heisen
- (United Kingdom) Arthur Fery / (United Kingdom) Tara Moore
- (United Kingdom) Aidan McHugh / (United Kingdom) Emily Webley-Smith
- (Netherlands) David Pel / (Netherlands) Rosalie van der Hoek
- (India) Ramkumar Ramanathan / (India) Ankita Raina
- (India) Divij Sharan / (United Kingdom) Samantha Murray Sharan

=== Withdrawals ===
During the tournament

- (Kazakhstan) Alexander Bublik / (Russia) Anastasia Pavlyuchenkova
- (New Zealand) Marcus Daniell / (Canada) Sharon Fichman
- (United Kingdom) Lloyd Glasspool / (United Kingdom) Jodie Burrage
- (Australia) Nick Kyrgios / (United States) Venus Williams
- (Japan) Ben McLachlan / (Japan) Ena Shibahara
- (Australia) Max Purcell / (Ukraine) Marta Kostyuk
- (United States) Rajeev Ram / (United States) Bethanie Mattek-Sands
- (New Zealand) Michael Venus / (Chinese Taipei) Chan Hao-ching

== See also ==
- 2021 Wimbledon Championships – Day-by-day summaries
