= 2021 Wimbledon Championships – Boys' singles =

Boys' singles
- 2021 Wimbledon Championships

Final
- Champion: (United States) Samir Banerjee
- Runner-up: (United States) Victor Lilov
- Score: 7–5, 6–3

Events
Singles	men	women		boys	girls
Doubles	men	women	mixed	boys	girls
WC Singles	men	women	quad	boys	girls
WC Doubles	men	women	quad	boys	girls
- Wimbledon Championships

Samir Banerjee won the title, defeating Victor Lilov in the final, 7–5, 6–3.

Shintaro Mochizuki was the defending champion, having won the previous edition in 2019, but chose not to participate. He received a wildcard into the men's singles qualifying competition, where he lost to Tallon Griekspoor in the second round.

== Seeds ==
1. (China) Shang Juncheng (semifinals)
2. (France) Luca Van Assche (first round)
3. (France) Arthur Fils (second round)
4. (United States) Bruno Kuzuhara (quarterfinals)
5. (Brazil) Pedro Boscardin Dias (third round)
6. (Spain) Daniel Rincón (second round)
7. (United Kingdom) Jack Pinnington Jones (quarterfinals)
8. (France) Sean Cuenin (second round)

9. (Ukraine) Viacheslav Bielinskyi (second round)
10. (United States) Dali Blanch (first round)
11. (Switzerland) Jérôme Kym (quarterfinals)
12. (Poland) Maks Kaśnikowski (first round)
13. (United States) Alexander Bernard (second round)
14. (Sweden) Leo Borg (second round)
15. (Spain) Alejandro Manzanera Pertusa (second round)
16. (Estonia) Mark Lajal (second round)

Click on the seed number of a player to go to their draw section.

== Draw ==
Key

- Q = Qualifier
- WC = Wild card
- LL = Lucky loser
- Alt = Alternate
- ITF = ITF entry
- PR = Protected ranking
- SR = Special ranking
- SE = Special exempt
- JE = Junior exempt
- JR = Junior Accelerator Programme entrant
- CO = College Accelerator Programme entrant
- NG = Next Gen Accelerator Program entrant
- w/o = Walkover
- r = Retired
- d = Defaulted

=== Finals ===
Quarterfinals
1	(China) Shang Juncheng	3	7^{7}	6
11	(Switzerland) Jérôme Kym	6	6^{2}	4
(United States) Victor Lilov	4	6	6
7	(United Kingdom) Jack Pinnington Jones	6	4	3
Q	(France) Sascha Gueymard Wayenburg	6^{5}	6	6
4	(United States) Bruno Kuzuhara	7^{7}	4	2
(United States) Samir Banerjee	6	6
Q	(Croatia) Mili Poljičak	1	1

Semifinals
1	(China) Shang Juncheng	3	1
(United States) Victor Lilov	6	6
Q	(France) Sascha Gueymard Wayenburg	6^{3}	6	2
(United States) Samir Banerjee	7^{7}	4	6

Final
(United States) Victor Lilov	5	3
(United States) Samir Banerjee	7	6

=== Top half ===
==== Section 1 ====
First round
1	(China) Shang Juncheng	6	6
Q	(Russia) Igor Kudriashov	4	3
WC	(United Kingdom) Louis Bowden	6^{4}	1
Q	(France) Robin Bertrand	7^{7}	6
(United States) Aidan Mayo	6^{5}	7^{7}	4
(Czech Republic) Matthew William Donald	7^{7}	6^{5}	6
(France) Mehdi Sadaoui	3	6	2
16	(Estonia) Mark Lajal	6	4	6
11	(Switzerland) Jérôme Kym	7^{7}	6
(Peru) Gonzalo Bueno	6^{5}	2
WC	(United Kingdom) Derrick Chen	6	6
Q	(Israel) Orel Kimhi	2	2
(Portugal) Miguel Gomes	2	3
(United States) Ozan Colak	6	6
WC	(United Kingdom) Roan Jones	6	1	0
6	(Spain) Daniel Rincón	4	6	6

Second round
1	(China) J Shang	6	6
Q	(France) R Bertrand	3	4
(Czech Republic) MW Donald	3	6	6
16	(Estonia) M Lajal	6	1	0
11	(Switzerland) J Kym	6	6
WC	(United Kingdom) D Chen	1	3
(United States) O Colak	6	4	6
6	(Spain) D Rincón	4	6	3

Third round
1	(China) J Shang	7^{7}	6
(Czech Republic) MW Donald	6^{5}	3
11	(Switzerland) J Kym	7^{7}	6
(United States) O Colak	6^{4}	4

Quarterfinals
1	(China) J Shang	3	7^{7}	6
11	(Switzerland) J Kym	6	6^{2}	4

==== Section 2 ====
First round
3	(France) Arthur Fils	6	6
(Japan) Kokoro Isomura	3	4
(United States) Victor Lilov	6	6
WC	(United Kingdom) Hugo Coquelin	3	1
(Czech Republic) Vojtěch Petr	6	6
(Spain) Daniel Mérida	3	3
(Serbia) Marko Topo	3	7^{7}	0
14	(Sweden) Leo Borg	6	6^{2}	6
10	(United States) Dali Blanch	5	6^{4}
(North Macedonia) Kalin Ivanovski	7	7^{7}
(Lithuania) Edas Butvilas	7^{7}	6
(Russia) Konstantin Zhzhenov	6^{0}	4
(Germany) Mika Lipp	6	3	4
(Brazil) João Victor Couto Loureiro	4	6	6
(Poland) Aleksander Orlikowski	2	4
7	(United Kingdom) Jack Pinnington Jones	6	6

Second round
3	(France) A Fils	3	6	4
(United States) V Lilov	6	4	6
(Czech Republic) V Petr	6	6
14	(Sweden) L Borg	1	2
(North Macedonia) K Ivanovski	7^{7}	7^{8}
(Lithuania) E Butvilas	6^{4}	6^{6}
(Brazil) JV Couto Loureiro	4	6	1
7	(United Kingdom) J Pinnington Jones	6	4	6

Third round
(United States) V Lilov	6	6
(Czech Republic) V Petr	2	1
(North Macedonia) K Ivanovski	5	0
7	(United Kingdom) J Pinnington Jones	7	6

Quarterfinals
(United States) V Lilov	4	6	6
7	(United Kingdom) J Pinnington Jones	6	4	3

=== Bottom half ===
==== Section 3 ====
First round
8	(France) Sean Cuenin	7^{7}	6^{3}	6
(Australia) Philip Sekulic	6^{5}	7^{7}	3
(Paraguay) Adolfo Daniel Vallejo	6	2	7
(United States) Ethan Quinn	1	6	5
Q	(France) Sascha Gueymard Wayenburg	2	6	6
(Serbia) Hamad Međedović	6	2	4
WC	(United Kingdom) Oliver Tarvet	6	2	6^{10}
9	(Ukraine) Viacheslav Bielinskyi	4	6	7^{12}
15	(Spain) Alejandro Manzanera Pertusa	7^{8}	6
(Hong Kong) Coleman Wong	6^{6}	3
WC	(United Kingdom) Fabio Nestola	3	3
(France) Max Westphal	6	6
(Jordan) Abedallah Shelbayh	6	6
(Sweden) Måns Dahlberg	4	3
WC	(United Kingdom) William Jansen	5	7^{8}	3
4	(United States) Bruno Kuzuhara	7	6^{6}	6

Second round
8	(France) S Cuenin	1	6	4
(Paraguay) AD Vallejo	6	4	6
Q	(France) S Gueymard Wayenburg	7	3	6
9	(Ukraine) V Bielinskyi	5	6	2
15	(Spain) A Manzanera Pertusa	3	7^{7}	6^{2}
(France) M Westphal	6	6^{5}	7^{7}
(Jordan) A Shelbayh	3	6^{4}
4	(United States) B Kuzuhara	6	7^{7}

Third round
(Paraguay) AD Vallejo	5	5
Q	(France) S Gueymard Wayenburg	7	7
(France) M Westphal	3	0^{r}
4	(United States) B Kuzuhara	6	3

Quarterfinals
Q	(France) S Gueymard Wayenburg	6^{5}	6	6
4	(United States) B Kuzuhara	7^{7}	4	2

==== Section 4 ====
First round
5	(Brazil) Pedro Boscardin Dias	7^{7}	6
Q	(United Kingdom) Billy Blaydes	6^{3}	1
(Bulgaria) Petr Nesterov	3	4
(United Kingdom) Lui Maxted	6	6
(Slovakia) Peter Benjamín Privara	7	7
(Ecuador) Álvaro Guillén Meza	5	5
(United States) Samir Banerjee	6	2	6
12	(Poland) Maks Kaśnikowski	2	6	3
13	(United States) Alexander Bernard	6	7
Q	(France) Charlélie Cosnet	4	5
WC	(United Kingdom) William Nolan	4	6^{5}
Q	(Croatia) Mili Poljičak	6	7^{7}
(Czech Republic) Adam Jurajda	7^{7}	2	1
Q	(United Kingdom) Patrick Brady	6^{1}	6	6
(Germany) Max Hans Rehberg	7^{8}	2	6
2	(France) Luca Van Assche	6^{6}	6	3

Second round
5	(Brazil) P Boscardin Dias	6	3	6
(United Kingdom) L Maxted	3	6	4
(Slovakia) PB Privara	1	7	1
(United States) S Banerjee	6	5	6
13	(United States) A Bernard	2	7^{9}	4
Q	(Croatia) M Poljičak	6	6^{7}	6
Q	(United Kingdom) P Brady	3	6	4
(Germany) MH Rehberg	6	4	6

Third round
5	(Brazil) P Boscardin Dias	2	1
(United States) S Banerjee	6	6
Q	(Croatia) M Poljičak	6	6
(Germany) MH Rehberg	1	3

Quarterfinals
(United States) S Banerjee	6	6
Q	(Croatia) M Poljičak	1	1

== Qualifying ==
=== Seeds ===
1. (France) Sascha Gueymard Wayenburg (qualified)
2. (Belgium) Martin Katz (first round)
3. (Lithuania) Vilius Gaubas (first round)
4. (Croatia) Mili Poljičak (qualified)
5. (Germany) Philip Florig (first round)
6. (Austria) Marko Andrejic (first round)
7. (Russia) Igor Kudriashov (qualified)
8. (United States) Aidan Kim (first round)
9. (Slovenia) Sebastian Dominko (first round)
10. (France) Robin Bertrand (qualified)
11. (United States) Azuma Visaya (first round)
12. (United States) Braden Shick (qualifying competition)
13. (Argentina) Ezequiel Monferrer (qualifying competition)
14. (Israel) Orel Kimhi (qualified)
15. (Croatia) Luka Mikrut (first round)
16. (Spain) Miguel Pérez Peña (first round)

=== Qualifiers ===
1. (France) Sascha Gueymard Wayenburg
2. (United Kingdom) Patrick Brady
3. (United Kingdom) Billy Blaydes
4. (Croatia) Mili Poljičak
5. (France) Charlélie Cosnet
6. (France) Robin Bertrand
7. (Russia) Igor Kudriashov
8. (Israel) Orel Kimhi

=== Draw ===
==== First qualifier ====
First round
1	(France) Sascha Gueymard Wayenburg	6	6
(United Kingdom) Matthew Rutter	2	2
(Portugal) Jaime Faria	7	7
16	(Spain) Miguel Pérez Peña	5	5

Qualifying competition
1	(France) Sascha Gueymard Wayenburg	6	6
(Portugal) Jaime Faria	3	4

==== Second qualifier ====
First round
2	(Belgium) Martin Katz	2	6	[7]
WC	(United Kingdom) Patrick Brady	6	1	[10]
(Japan) Yamato Sueoka	3	4
12	(United States) Braden Shick	6	6

Qualifying competition
WC	(United Kingdom) Patrick Brady	6	7^{8}
12	(United States) Braden Shick	3	6^{6}

==== Third qualifier ====
First round
3	(Lithuania) Vilius Gaubas	3	6^{4}
WC	(United Kingdom) Billy Blaydes	6	7^{7}
(Serbia) Stefan Popović	7^{7}	6
9	(Slovenia) Sebastian Dominko	6^{3}	2

Qualifying competition
WC	(United Kingdom) Billy Blaydes	7^{7}	3	[10]
(Serbia) Stefan Popović	6^{5}	6	[5]

==== Fourth qualifier ====
First round
4	(Croatia) Mili Poljičak	6	6
(United States) Nicholas Godsick	2	2
(Cyprus) Constantinos Koshis	2	7^{7}	[10]
13	(Argentina) Ezequiel Monferrer	6	6^{5}	[12]

Qualifying competition
4	(Croatia) Mili Poljičak	6	6
13	(Argentina) Ezequiel Monferrer	3	2

==== Fifth qualifier ====
First round
5	(Germany) Philip Florig	6	6^{5}	[7]
(France) Charlélie Cosnet	2	7^{7}	[10]
WC	(United Kingdom) Miles Groom	6	6^{5}	[12]
11	(United States) Azuma Visaya	1	7^{7}	[10]

Qualifying competition
(France) Charlélie Cosnet	6	6
WC	(United Kingdom) Miles Groom	3	4

==== Sixth qualifier ====
First round
6	(Austria) Marko Andrejic	1	6	[5]
(Portugal) Henrique Rocha	6	3	[10]
WC	(United Kingdom) Luca Pow	4	1
10	(France) Robin Bertrand	6	6

Qualifying competition
(Portugal) Henrique Rocha	0	6	[13]
10	(France) Robin Bertrand	6	2	[15]

==== Seventh qualifier ====
First round
7	(Russia) Igor Kudriashov	6	6
WC	(United Kingdom) Phoenix Weir	4	4
(United States) Benjamin Kittay	4	7	[10]
15	(Croatia) Luka Mikrut	6	5	[7]

Qualifying competition
7	(Russia) Igor Kudriashov	6	6
(United States) Benjamin Kittay	2	4

==== Eighth qualifier ====
First round
8	(United States) Aidan Kim	3	3
(Italy) Gabriele Piraino	6	6
WC	(United Kingdom) Alexander Knox Jones	2	2
14	(Israel) Orel Kimhi	6	6

Qualifying competition
(Italy) Gabriele Piraino	6^{2}	7	[10]
14	(Israel) Orel Kimhi	7^{7}	5	[12]
