= 2021 Wimbledon Championships – Boys' doubles =

Boys' doubles
- 2021 Wimbledon Championships

Final
- Champions: (Lithuania) Edas Butvilas (Spain) Alejandro Manzanera Pertusa
- Runners-up: (Spain) Daniel Rincón (Jordan) Abedallah Shelbayh
- Score: 6–3, 6–4

Events
Singles	men	women		boys	girls
Doubles	men	women	mixed	boys	girls
WC Singles	men	women	quad	boys	girls
WC Doubles	men	women	quad	boys	girls
- Wimbledon Championships

Jonáš Forejtek and Jiří Lehečka were the defending champions, but were no longer eligible to participate in junior tournaments.

Edas Butvilas and Alejandro Manzanera Pertusa won the title, defeating Daniel Rincón and Abedallah Shelbayh in the final, 6–3, 6–4.

== Seeds ==
1. (United Kingdom) Jack Pinnington Jones / (China) Shang Juncheng (second round, withdrew)
2. (France) Sean Cuenin / (France) Luca Van Assche (first round)
3. (United States) Alexander Bernard / (United States) Dali Blanch (second round)
4. (Sweden) Leo Borg / (Estonia) Mark Lajal (second round)
5. (Poland) Maks Kaśnikowski / (Poland) Aleksander Orlikowski (first round)
6. (United States) Bruno Kuzuhara / (United States) Ethan Quinn (second round)
7. (Ukraine) Viacheslav Bielinskyi / (Bulgaria) Petr Nesterov (second round)
8. (Spain) Daniel Mérida / (Hong Kong) Coleman Wong (first round)

== Draw ==
Key

- Q = Qualifier
- WC = Wild card
- LL = Lucky loser
- Alt = Alternate
- ITF = ITF entry
- PR = Protected ranking
- SR = Special ranking
- SE = Special exempt
- JE = Junior exempt
- JR = Junior Accelerator Programme entrant
- CO = College Accelerator Programme entrant
- NG = Next Gen Accelerator Program entrant
- w/o = Walkover
- r = Retired
- d = Defaulted

=== Finals ===
Semifinals
(United States) Samir Banerjee (Japan) Kokoro Isomura	4	2
(Spain) Daniel Rincón (Jordan) Abedallah Shelbayh	6	6
(Lithuania) Edas Butvilas (Spain) Alejandro Manzanera Pertusa	6	6
(Peru) Gonzalo Bueno (Paraguay) Adolfo Daniel Vallejo	4	4

Final
(Spain) Daniel Rincón (Jordan) Abedallah Shelbayh	3	4
(Lithuania) Edas Butvilas (Spain) Alejandro Manzanera Pertusa	6	6

=== Top half ===
First round
1	(United Kingdom) Jack Pinnington Jones (China) Shang Juncheng	6	3	[10]
(Israel) Orel Kimhi (Australia) Philip Sekulic	3	6	[5]
(United States) Samir Banerjee (Japan) Kokoro Isomura	7	6
(France) Sascha Gueymard Wayenburg (France) Mehdi Sadaoui	5	3
(Czech Republic) Adam Jurajda (France) Max Westphal	6	6
WC	(United Kingdom) Patrick Brady (United Kingdom) Oliver Tarvet	1	4
(Germany) Philip Florig (Germany) Max Hans Rehberg	2	6	[10]
5	(Poland) Maks Kaśnikowski (Poland) Aleksander Orlikowski	6	2	[4]
3	(United States) Alexander Bernard (United States) Dali Blanch	7	6
(Sweden) Måns Dahlberg (Czech Republic) Matthew William Donald	5	4
(North Macedonia) Kalin Ivanovski (Croatia) Mili Poljičak	4	4
(Spain) Daniel Rincón (Jordan) Abedallah Shelbayh	6	6
(Brazil) Pedro Boscardin Dias (Brazil) João Victor Couto Loureiro	3	1
(France) Robin Bertrand (Russia) Igor Kudriashov	6	6
WC	(United Kingdom) Lui Maxted (United Kingdom) William Nolan	5	5
7	(Ukraine) Viacheslav Bielinskyi (Bulgaria) Petr Nesterov	7	7

Second round
1	(United Kingdom) J Pinnington Jones (China) J Shang
(United States) S Banerjee (Japan) K Isomura	w/o
(Czech Republic) A Jurajda (France) M Westphal	6^{6}	6	[7]
(Germany) P Florig (Germany) MH Rehberg	7^{8}	4	[10]
3	(United States) A Bernard (United States) Dal Blanch	5	6^{5}
(Spain) D Rincón (Jordan) A Shelbayh	7	7^{7}
(France) R Bertrand (Russia) I Kudriashov	6	6
7	(Ukraine) V Bielinskyi (Bulgaria) P Nesterov	1	4

Quarterfinals
(United States) S Banerjee (Japan) K Isomura	6	6
(Germany) P Florig (Germany) MH Rehberg	3	0
(Spain) D Rincón (Jordan) A Shelbayh	6^{8}	7	[10]
(France) R Bertrand (Russia) I Kudriashov	7^{10}	5	[6]

Semifinals
(United States) S Banerjee (Japan) K Isomura	4	2
(Spain) D Rincón (Jordan) A Shelbayh	6	6

=== Bottom half ===
First round
6	(United States) Bruno Kuzuhara (United States) Ethan Quinn	6	6
WC	(United Kingdom) Billy Blaydes (United Kingdom) William Jansen	2	4
(United States) Victor Lilov (Slovakia) Peter Benjamín Privara	4	7^{7}	[11]
(France) Charlélie Cosnet (Germany) Mika Lipp	6	6^{5}	[9]
(Lithuania) Edas Butvilas (Spain) Alejandro Manzanera Pertusa	6	6
(Belgium) Martin Katz (Czech Republic) Vojtěch Petr	3	4
(Slovenia) Sebastian Dominko (Russia) Konstantin Zhzhenov	6	3	[10]
4	(Sweden) Leo Borg (Estonia) Mark Lajal	3	6	[12]
8	(Spain) Daniel Mérida (Hong Kong) Coleman Wong	6	5	[5]
(Peru) Gonzalo Bueno (Paraguay) Adolfo Daniel Vallejo	3	7	[10]
(Peru) Miguel Gomes (Portugal) Henrique Rocha	2	4
(Austria) Marko Andrejic (United States) Ozan Colak	6	6
(Serbia) Hamad Međedović (Serbia) Stefan Popović	6	3	[10]
WC	(United Kingdom) Fabio Nestola (United Kingdom) Phoenix Weir	4	6	[8]
(Ecuador) Álvaro Guillén Meza (Argentina) Ezequiel Monferrer	6^{1}	7	[10]
2	(France) Sean Cuenin (France) Luca Van Assche	7^{7}	5	[6]

Second round
6	(United States) B Kuzuhara (United States) E Quinn	6^{4}	2
(United States) V Lilov (Slovakia) PB Privara	7^{7}	6
(Lithuania) E Butvilas (Spain) A Manzanera Pertusa	7	3	[10]
4	(Sweden) L Borg (Estonia) M Lajal	5	6	[6]
(Peru) G Bueno (Paraguay) AD Vallejo	6	7^{7}
(Austria) M Andrejic (United States) O Colak	2	6^{3}
(Serbia) H Međedović (Serbia) S Popović	4	5
(Ecuador) A Guillén Meza (Argentina) E Monferrer	6	7

Quarterfinals
(United States) V Lilov (Slovakia) PB Privara	3	6	[7]
(Lithuania) E Butvilas (Spain) A Manzanera Pertusa	6	3	[10]
(Peru) G Bueno (Paraguay) AD Vallejo	6	6
(Ecuador) A Guillén Meza (Argentina) E Monferrer	2	4

Semifinals
(Lithuania) E Butvilas (Spain) A Manzanera Pertusa	6	6
(Peru) G Bueno (Paraguay) AD Vallejo	4	4
