= 2022 Champaign–Urbana Challenger – Singles =

Urbana Challenger – Singles
- 2022 Champaign–Urbana Challenger

Final
- Champion: (United States) Ben Shelton
- Runner-up: (Australia) Aleksandar Vukic
- Score: 0–6, 6–3, 6–2

Events
| Singles | Doubles |
| ← 2021 · | Champaign–Urbana Challenger | · 2023 → |

Stefan Kozlov was the defending champion but lost in the first round to Prajnesh Gunneswaran.

Ben Shelton won the title after defeating Aleksandar Vukic 0–6, 6–3, 6–2 in the final.

== Seeds ==
1. (United States) Denis Kudla (first round)
2. (United States) Steve Johnson (quarterfinals)
3. (United States) Christopher Eubanks (semifinals)
4. (United States) Ben Shelton (champion)
5. (United States) Stefan Kozlov (first round)
6. (Australia) Aleksandar Vukic (final)
7. (United States) Aleksandar Kovacevic (semifinals)
8. (China) Shang Juncheng (first round)

== Draw ==
Key

- Q = Qualifier
- WC = Wild card
- LL = Lucky loser
- Alt = Alternate
- ITF = ITF entry
- PR = Protected ranking
- SR = Special ranking
- SE = Special exempt
- JE = Junior exempt
- JR = Junior Accelerator Programme entrant
- CO = College Accelerator Programme entrant
- NG = Next Gen Accelerator Program entrant
- w/o = Walkover
- r = Retired
- d = Defaulted

=== Finals ===
Semifinals
6 | (Australia) Aleksandar Vukic | 7^{9} | 6
3 | (United States) Christopher Eubanks | 6^{7} | 4
4 | (United States) Ben Shelton | 6^{3} | 6 | 6
7 | (United States) Aleksandar Kovacevic | 7^{7} | 2 | 4

Final
6 | (Australia) Aleksandar Vukic | 6 | 3 | 2
4 | (United States) Ben Shelton | 0 | 6 | 6

=== Top half ===
First round
1 | (United States) D Kudla | 6^{1} | 6^{6}
(Spain) N Álvarez Varona | 7^{7} | 7^{8}
Q | (Denmark) A Holmgren | 1 | 6 | 6
(United Kingdom) P Jubb | 6 | 3 | 4
Q | (United States) P Kypson | 6 | 6
Q | (Spain) I Montes de la Torre | 1 | 4
(United Kingdom) A McHugh | 2 | 4
6 | (Australia) A Vukic | 6 | 6
3 | (United States) C Eubanks | 6 | 6
(Australia) A Walton | 3 | 3
(United States) T Sandgren | 3 | 6 | 6
(Zimbabwe) B Lock | 6 | 1 | 0
Q | (United States) Alexander Petrov | 0 | 4
LL | (United States) E Zhu | 6 | 6
Q | (United States) S Kirchheimer | 7^{9} | 6
8 | (China) J Shang | 6^{7} | 4

Second round
(Spain) N Álvarez Varona | 6 | 7^{7}
Q | (Denmark) A Holmgren | 4 | 6^{3}
Q | (United States) P Kypson | 4 | 2
6 | (Australia) A Vukic | 6 | 6
3 | (United States) C Eubanks | 6 | 6
(United States) T Sandgren | 4 | 3
LL | (United States) E Zhu | 6 | 7^{7}
Q | (United States) S Kirchheimer | 4 | 6^{3}

Quarterfinals
(Spain) N Álvarez Varona | 6^{6} | 4
6 | (Australia) A Vukic | 7^{8} | 6
3 | (United States) C Eubanks | 6 | 6
LL | (United States) E Zhu | 1 | 2

Semifinals
6 | (Australia) A Vukic | 7^{9} | 6
3 | (United States) C Eubanks | 6^{7} | 4

=== Bottom half ===
First round
5 | (United States) S Kozlov | 6 | 3 | 4
(India) P Gunneswaran | 3 | 6 | 6
(Germany) S Fanselow | 6 | 6
(United States) Ezekiel Clark | 1 | 1
Q | (United States) E Quinn | 7 | 6
WC | (France) Mathis Debru | 5 | 2
WC | (Latvia) K Ozoliņš | 3 | 4
4 | (United States) B Shelton | 6 | 6
7 | (United States) A Kovacevic | 7 | 7
(United States) A Ayeni | 5 | 5
(United States) E Escobedo | 6 | 3 | 6
(United States) Z Svajda | 1 | 6 | 3
(Germany) Lucas Gerch | 6 | 6
(United States) N Chappell | 3 | 4
WC | (United States) Hunter Heck | 7^{7} | 3 | 2
2 | (United States) S Johnson | 6^{1} | 6 | 6

Second round
(India) P Gunneswaran | 3 | 6 | 7
(Germany) S Fanselow | 6 | 2 | 5
Q | (United States) E Quinn | 4 | 4
4 | (United States) B Shelton | 6 | 6
7 | (United States) A Kovacevic | 3 | 6 | 6
(United States) E Escobedo | 6 | 4 | 2
(Germany) L Gerch | 6 | 3 | 4
2 | (United States) S Johnson | 4 | 6 | 6

Quarterfinals
(India) P Gunneswaran | 3 | 5
4 | (United States) B Shelton | 6 | 7
7 | (United States) A Kovacevic | 6 | 6
2 | (United States) S Johnson | 3 | 4

Semifinals
4 | (United States) B Shelton | 6^{3} | 6 | 6
7 | (United States) A Kovacevic | 7^{7} | 2 | 4
