= 2023 Champaign–Urbana Challenger – Singles =

Urbana Challenger – Singles
- 2023 Champaign–Urbana Challenger

Final
- Champion: (United States) Patrick Kypson
- Runner-up: (United States) Alex Michelsen
- Score: 6–4, 6–3

Events
Singles	Doubles
← 2022 ·	Champaign–Urbana Challenger	· 2024 →

Ben Shelton was the defending champion but chose not to defend his title.

Patrick Kypson won the title after defeating Alex Michelsen 6–4, 6–3 in the final.

== Seeds ==
1. (United States) Aleksandar Kovacevic (quarterfinals)
2. (United States) Alex Michelsen (final)
3. (United States) Emilio Nava (first round)
4. (France) Titouan Droguet (semifinals)
5. (United States) Denis Kudla (first round, retired)
6. (Kazakhstan) Beibit Zhukayev (second round)
7. (United States) Patrick Kypson (champion)
8. (United States) Martin Damm (quarterfinals)

== Draw ==
=== Key ===
- Q = Qualifier
- WC = Wild card
- LL = Lucky loser
- Alt = Alternate
- SE = Special exempt
- PR = Protected ranking
- ITF = ITF entry
- JE = Junior exempt
- w/o = Walkover
- r = Retired
- d = Defaulted
- SR = Special ranking

=== Finals ===
Semifinals
7	(United States) Patrick Kypson	6	6
WC	(United States) Ethan Quinn	4	2
4	(France) Titouan Droguet	6	4	3
2	(United States) Alex Michelsen	2	6	6

Final
7	(United States) Patrick Kypson	6	6
2	(United States) Alex Michelsen	4	3

=== Top half ===
First round
1	(United States) A Kovacevic	6	2	6
Q	(United States) C Williams	3	6	4
Alt	(United States) S Kozlov	6	3	4
WC	(Latvia) K Ozoliņš	2	6	6
Q	(United States) Hunter Heck	3	4
WC	(Japan) Kenta Miyoshi	6	6
Q	(United Kingdom) M Whitehouse	1	6^{5}
7	(United States) P Kypson	6	7^{7}
3	(United States) Em Nava	3	2
WC	(United States) E Quinn	6	6
Alt	E Karlovskiy	5	4^{r}
(United States) S Kirchheimer	7	5
(Croatia) N Serdarušić	6	1	6
(United States) A Mayo	3	6	3
(Italy) E Dalla Valle	1	1
6	(Kazakhstan) B Zhukayev	6	6

Second round
1	(United States) A Kovacevic	7^{7}	6
WC	(Latvia) K Ozoliņš	6^{5}	3
WC	(Japan) K Miyoshi	3	1
7	(United States) P Kypson	6	6
WC	(United States) E Quinn	6	6
(United States) S Kirchheimer	1	4
(Croatia) N Serdarušić	7^{7}	6
6	(Kazakhstan) B Zhukayev	6^{5}	4

Quarterfinals
1	(United States) A Kovacevic	6^{2}	6	3
7	(United States) P Kypson	7^{7}	4	6
WC	(United States) E Quinn	6	6
(Croatia) N Serdarušić	3	3

Semifinals
7	(United States) P Kypson	6	6
WC	(United States) E Quinn	4	2

=== Bottom half ===
First round
5	(United States) D Kudla	7^{7}	5	0^{r}
(United States) M Krueger	6^{4}	7	0
(Luxembourg) C Rodesch	7	4	4
Q	(United States) A Rybakov	5	6	6
(United States) B Holt	5	6	6
Q	(Spain) I Montes de la Torre	7	0	1
(Norway) V Durasovic	2	3
4	(France) T Droguet	6	6
8	(United States) M Damm	7^{7}	6
Q	(United States) A Perez	6^{3}	4
(France) G Debru	6^{7}	6	6^{4}
Alt	(Germany) M Rosenkranz	7^{9}	3	7^{7}
(United Kingdom) A McHugh	2	6	3
(Germany) S Fanselow	6	4	6
(Australia) B Tomic	4	0
2	(United States) A Michelsen	6	6

Second round
(United States) M Krueger	7^{7}	6
Q	(United States) A Rybakov	6^{5}	1
(United States) B Holt	4	3
4	(France) T Droguet	6	6
8	(United States) M Damm	6	6
Alt	(Germany) M Rosenkranz	3	4
(Germany) S Fanselow	3	2
2	(United States) A Michelsen	6	6

Quarterfinals
(United States) M Krueger	4	1
4	(France) T Droguet	6	6
8	(United States) M Damm	1	6	4
2	(United States) A Michelsen	6	1	6

Semifinals
4	(France) T Droguet	6	4	3
2	(United States) A Michelsen	2	6	6
