= 2022 Lexington Challenger =

Tennis tournament

- Date: 1–7 August 2022
- Edition: 27th (men); 25th (women)
- Category: ATP Challenger Tour; ITF Women's World Tennis Tour
- Prize money: $53,120 (men) $60,000 (women)
- Surface: Hard / Outdoor
- Location: Lexington, Kentucky, United States

Champions

Men's singles
- (China) Shang Juncheng

Women's singles
- (United Kingdom) Katie Swan

Men's doubles
- (India) Yuki Bhambri / (India) Saketh Myneni

Women's doubles
- (Indonesia) Aldila Sutjiadi / (Ukraine) Kateryna Volodko
- Lexington Challenger

The 2022 Lexington Challenger was a professional tennis tournament played on outdoor hard courts. It was the twenty-seventh edition of the tournament which was part of the 2022 ATP Challenger Tour, and the twenty-fifth edition of the tournament which was part of the 2022 ITF Women's World Tennis Tour. It took place in Lexington, Kentucky, United States between 1 and 7 August 2022.

== Champions ==
=== Men's singles ===
- (China) Shang Juncheng def. (Ecuador) Emilio Gómez 6–4, 6–4.

=== Men's doubles ===
- (India) Yuki Bhambri / (India) Saketh Myneni def. (Netherlands) Gijs Brouwer / (United Kingdom) Aidan McHugh 3–6, 6–4, [10–8].

=== Women's singles ===
- (United Kingdom) Katie Swan def. (United Kingdom) Jodie Burrage, 6–0, 3–6, 6–3

=== Women's doubles ===
- (Indonesia) Aldila Sutjiadi / (Ukraine) Kateryna Volodko def. (United States) Jada Hart / (United States) Dalayna Hewitt, 7–5, 6–3

== Men's singles main draw entrants ==
=== Seeds ===
Country	Player	Rank^{1}	Seed
	Roman Safiullin	119	1
ECU	Emilio Gómez	146	2
CZE	Dalibor Svrčina	169	3
NED	Gijs Brouwer	195	4
KAZ	Mikhail Kukushkin	207	5
ARG	Genaro Alberto Olivieri	226	6
USA	Aleksandar Kovacevic	227	7
FRA	Enzo Couacaud	230	8

- ^{1} Rankings as of 25 July 2022.

=== Other entrants ===
The following players received a wildcard into the singles main draw:

- (United Kingdom) Millen Hurrion
- (United States) Aleksandar Kovacevic
- (United States) Evan Zhu

The following player received entry into the singles main draw using a protected ranking:

- (Australia) ~~Andrew Harris~~

The following players received entry into the singles main draw as alternates:

- (United States) Govind Nanda
- (India) Mukund Sasikumar
- (Denmark) Mikael Torpegaard

The following players received entry from the qualifying draw:

- (United States) Alafia Ayeni
- (United States) Gage Brymer
- (United States) Stefan Dostanic
- (United States) Ryan Harrison
- (United States) Cannon Kingsley
- (United States) Strong Kirchheimer

The following player received entry as a lucky loser:

- (United States) Kyle Seelig

== Women's singles main draw entrants ==
=== Seeds ===
Country	Player	Rank^{1}	Seed
JPN	Moyuka Uchijima	130	1
GBR	Jodie Burrage	144	2
FRA	Tessah Andrianjafitrimo	173	3
AUS	Priscilla Hon	197	4
AUS	Seone Mendez	199	5
ISR	Lina Glushko	220	6
AUS	Lizette Cabrera	226	7
GBR	Katie Swan	227	8

- ^{1} Rankings are as of 25 July 2022.

=== Other entrants ===
The following players received wildcards into the singles main draw:

- (United States) Samantha Crawford
- (United States) Qavia Lopez
- (United States) Madison Sieg
- (Indonesia) Aldila Sutjiadi

The following players received entry from the qualifying draw:

- (United States) Jessie Aney
- (United States) Dalayna Hewitt
- Veronica Miroshnichenko
- (United States) Taylor Ng
- (United States) Erica Oosterhout
- (United States) Adriana Reami
- (United States) Peyton Stearns
- (Germany) Jantje Tilbürger
