= 2024 Champaign–Urbana Challenger – Doubles =

Urbana Challenger – Doubles
- 2024 Champaign–Urbana Challenger

Final
- Champions: (United States) Evan King (United States) Reese Stalder
- Runners-up: (United Kingdom) James Davis (United Kingdom) James MacKinlay
- Score: 7–6^{(7–3)}, 7–5

Events
Singles	Doubles
← 2023 ·	Champaign–Urbana Challenger	· 2025 →

John-Patrick Smith and Sem Verbeek were the defending champions but chose not to defend their title.

Evan King and Reese Stalder won the title after defeating James Davis and James MacKinlay 7–6^{(7–3)}, 7–5 in the final.

== Seeds ==
1. (United States) Evan King / (United States) Reese Stalder (champions)
2. (Mexico) Hans Hach Verdugo / (Poland) Szymon Walków (quarterfinals)
3. (United States) Trey Hilderbrand / (United States) Alex Lawson (first round)
4. (Australia) Patrick Harper / (United States) Mac Kiger (semifinals)

== Draw ==
Key

- Q = Qualifier
- WC = Wild card
- LL = Lucky loser
- Alt = Alternate
- ITF = ITF entry
- PR = Protected ranking
- SR = Special ranking
- SE = Special exempt
- JE = Junior exempt
- JR = Junior Accelerator Programme entrant
- CO = College Accelerator Programme entrant
- NG = Next Gen Accelerator Program entrant
- w/o = Walkover
- r = Retired
- d = Defaulted

=== Draw ===
First round
1	(United States) E King (United States) R Stalder	6	6
(United Kingdom) J Pinnington Jones (United States) A Rybakov	4	4
(United States) Lucas Horve (United Kingdom) Oliver Okonkwo	7^{8}	6
(United Kingdom) J Clarke (New Zealand) F Reynolds	6^{6}	3
4	(Australia) P Harper (United States) M Kiger	7	6
WC	(France) Mathis Debru (Japan) Kenta Miyoshi	5	3
(Philippines) FC Alcantara (India) Sai Karteek Reddy Ganta	6	3	[10]
(United States) T Kodat (Canada) K Stevenson	4	6	[3]
(Lebanon) H Habib (United States) W Woodall	7	7^{10}
Alt	(United States) Henry Barrett (United States) Felix Corwin	5	6^{8}
WC	(United States) Tyler Bowers (Australia) Zack Viiala	7^{8}	4	[10]
3	(United States) T Hilderbrand (United States) A Lawson	6^{6}	6	[8]
(United Kingdom) James Davis (United Kingdom) J MacKinlay	6	6
E Karlovskiy (United States) K Smith	4	4
(Georgia (country)) S Purtseladze (Israel) R Stepanov	2	3
2	(Mexico) H Hach Verdugo (Poland) S Walków	6	6

Quarterfinals
1	(United States) E King (United States) R Stalder	4	6	[10]
(United States) L Horve (United Kingdom) O Okonkwo	6	3	[5]
4	(Australia) P Harper (United States) M Kiger	6	6
(Philippines) FC Alcantara (India) SKR Ganta	1	2
(Lebanon) H Habib (United States) W Woodall	3	0
WC	(United States) T Bowers (Australia) Z Viiala	6	6
(United Kingdom) J Davis (United Kingdom) J MacKinlay	3	6	[10]
2	(Mexico) H Hach Verdugo (Poland) S Walków	6	3	[8]

Semifinals
1	(United States) E King (United States) R Stalder	6	6^{6}	[10]
4	(Australia) P Harper (United States) M Kiger	4	7^{8}	[4]
WC	(United States) T Bowers (Australia) Z Viiala	2	1
(United Kingdom) J Davis (United Kingdom) J MacKinlay	6	6

Final
1	(United States) E King (United States) R Stalder	7^{7}	7
(United Kingdom) J Davis (United Kingdom) J MacKinlay	6^{3}	5
