= 2022 Lexington Challenger – Men's doubles =

Men's doubles
- 2022 Lexington Challenger

Final
- Champions: (India) Yuki Bhambri (India) Saketh Myneni
- Runners-up: (Netherlands) Gijs Brouwer (United Kingdom) Aidan McHugh
- Score: 3–6, 6–4, [10–8]

Events
Singles	men	women
Doubles	men	women
← 2021 ·	Lexington Challenger	· 2023 →

Liam Draxl and Stefan Kozlov were the defending champions but chose not to defend their title.

Yuki Bhambri and Saketh Myneni won the title after defeating Gijs Brouwer and Aidan McHugh 3–6, 6–4, [10–8] in the final.

== Seeds ==
1. (United States) Evan King / (New Zealand) Artem Sitak (first round)
2. (India) Yuki Bhambri / (India) Saketh Myneni (champions)
3. (United Kingdom) Julian Cash / (United Kingdom) Henry Patten (quarterfinals)
4. (Philippines) Ruben Gonzales / (United States) Reese Stalder (quarterfinals)

== Draw ==
Key

- Q = Qualifier
- WC = Wild card
- LL = Lucky loser
- Alt = Alternate
- ITF = ITF entry
- PR = Protected ranking
- SR = Special ranking
- SE = Special exempt
- JE = Junior exempt
- JR = Junior Accelerator Programme entrant
- CO = College Accelerator Programme entrant
- NG = Next Gen Accelerator Program entrant
- w/o = Walkover
- r = Retired
- d = Defaulted

First round
1	(United States) E King (New Zealand) A Sitak	6	6^{4}	[11]
(Lebanon) H Habib (Canada) B Sigouin	4	7^{7}	[13]
(Netherlands) G Brouwer (United Kingdom) A McHugh	6	7^{7}
(China) J Shang (Australia) L Tu	4	6^{5}
3	(United Kingdom) J Cash (United Kingdom) H Patten	4
WC	(United States) B Holt (United States) G Nanda	1^{r}
(South Korea) Y-s Chung (Argentina) GA Olivieri	2	4
(France) E Couacaud (Australia) A Harris	6	6
(United States) B Battistone (United States) Jamie Vance	4	7^{9}	[6]
4	(Philippines) R Gonzales (United States) R Stalder	6	6^{7}	[10]
(United Kingdom) B Harris (Greece) Pe Tsitsipas	6^{3}	4
Alt	(Colombia) N Mejía (Colombia) A Urrea	7^{7}	6
WC	(United Kingdom) Millen Hurrion (United States) J Mercer	6	3	[6]
2	(India) Y Bhambri (India) S Myneni	4	6	[10]

Quarterfinals
(Lebanon) H Habib (Canada) B Sigouin	6^{5}	2
(Netherlands) G Brouwer (United Kingdom) A McHugh	7^{7}	6
3	(United Kingdom) J Cash (United Kingdom) H Patten	4	6	[9]
(France) E Couacaud (Australia) A Harris	6	3	[11]
(India) P Raja (India) D Sharan	3	7^{7}	[10]
4	(Philippines) R Gonzales (United States) R Stalder	6	6^{2}	[6]
Alt	(Colombia) N Mejía (Colombia) A Urrea	1	4
2	(India) Y Bhambri (India) S Myneni	6	6

Semifinals
(Netherlands) G Brouwer (United Kingdom) A McHugh	4	7	[10]
(France) E Couacaud (Australia) A Harris	6	5	[7]
(India) P Raja (India) D Sharan	4	3
2	(India) Y Bhambri (India) S Myneni	6	6

Final
(Netherlands) G Brouwer (United Kingdom) A McHugh	6	4	[8]
2	(India) Y Bhambri (India) S Myneni	3	6	[10]
