= 2024 Champaign–Urbana Challenger – Singles =

Urbana Challenger – Singles
- 2024 Champaign–Urbana Challenger

Final
- Champion: (United States) Ethan Quinn
- Runner-up: (United States) Nishesh Basavareddy
- Score: 6–3, 6–1

Events
Singles	Doubles
- Champaign–Urbana Challenger

Patrick Kypson was the defending champion but lost in the quarterfinals to Eliot Spizzirri.

Ethan Quinn won the title after defeating Nishesh Basavareddy 6–3, 6–1 in the final.

== Seeds ==
1. (Australia) Adam Walton (first round)
2. (United States) Christopher Eubanks (second round)
3. (United States) Learner Tien (first round)
4. (United States) Mitchell Krueger (first round)
5. (United States) Nishesh Basavareddy (final)
6. (United States) Patrick Kypson (quarterfinals)
7. (Estonia) Mark Lajal (first round)
8. (Kazakhstan) Beibit Zhukayev (second round)

== Draw ==
Key

- Q = Qualifier
- WC = Wild card
- LL = Lucky loser
- Alt = Alternate
- ITF = ITF entry
- PR = Protected ranking
- SR = Special ranking
- SE = Special exempt
- JE = Junior exempt
- JR = Junior Accelerator Programme entrant
- CO = College Accelerator Programme entrant
- NG = Next Gen Accelerator Program entrant
- w/o = Walkover
- r = Retired
- d = Defaulted

=== Finals ===
Semifinals
(United States) Ethan Quinn	6	6
WC	(Japan) Kenta Miyoshi	3	2
(United States) Eliot Spizzirri	1	1
5	(United States) Nishesh Basavareddy	6	6

Final
(United States) Ethan Quinn	6	6
5	(United States) Nishesh Basavareddy	3	1

=== Top half ===
First round
1	(Australia) A Walton	3	4
(United States) E Quinn	6	6
(Lebanon) H Habib	4	6	7
(United States) T Kodat	6	2	5
Q	(United States) Micah Braswell	5	6	6
WC	(Australia) Jeremy Zhang	7	3	2
(United Kingdom) H Searle	3	6^{4}
8	(Kazakhstan) B Zhukayev	6	7^{7}
3	(United States) L Tien	2	6	5
(United Kingdom) A McHugh	6	4	7
WC	(Japan) Kenta Miyoshi	6	6
E Karlovskiy	1	2
(United States) Patrick Maloney	6	6
(Italy) Edoardo Lavagno	2	0
(United Kingdom) J Pinnington Jones	6	3	6
7	(Estonia) M Lajal	3	6	3

Second round
(United States) E Quinn	6	6
(Lebanon) H Habib	4	4
Q	(United States) M Braswell	3	6	7^{7}
8	(Kazakhstan) B Zhukayev	6	3	6^{4}
(United Kingdom) A McHugh	6	6^{4}	5
WC	(Japan) K Miyoshi	2	7^{7}	7
(United States) P Maloney	2	4
(United Kingdom) J Pinnington Jones	6	6

Quarterfinals
(United States) E Quinn	6	6
Q	(United States) M Braswell	2	3
WC	(Japan) K Miyoshi	7^{7}	6
(United Kingdom) J Pinnington Jones	6^{3}	2

Semifinals
(United States) E Quinn	6	6
WC	(Japan) K Miyoshi	3	2

=== Bottom half ===
First round
6	(United States) P Kypson	1	7^{7}	6
(United States) S Kozlov	6	6^{3}	4
Q	(United States) S Kirchheimer	5	7	7
Alt	(United States) T Zink	7	5	5
Q	(United States) Felix Corwin	0	6^{4}
(United Kingdom) J Clarke	6	7^{7}
(United States) E Spizzirri	6	6
4	(United States) M Krueger	1	4
5	(United States) N Basavareddy	6	6
Q	Martin Borisiouk	3	1
Q	(United States) Ezekiel Clark	3	2
Q	(United States) A Rybakov	6	6
(United States) G Nanda	6	6
WC	(United States) William Mroz	4	4
(Georgia (country)) S Purtseladze	4	6^{3}
2	(United States) C Eubanks	6	7^{7}

Second round
6	(United States) P Kypson	6	6
Q	(United States) S Kirchheimer	1	2
(United Kingdom) J Clarke	6	5	2
(United States) E Spizzirri	4	7	6
5	(United States) N Basavareddy	7	6
Q	(United States) A Rybakov	5	4
(United States) G Nanda	3	6	6
2	(United States) C Eubanks	6	2	3

Quarterfinals
6	(United States) P Kypson	4	3
(United States) E Spizzirri	6	6
5	(United States) N Basavareddy	6	6
(United States) G Nanda	2	4

Semifinals
(United States) E Spizzirri	1	1
5	(United States) N Basavareddy	6	6
