= 2022 Lexington Challenger – Men's singles =

Men's singles
- 2022 Lexington Challenger

Final
- Champion: (China) Shang Juncheng
- Runner-up: (Ecuador) Emilio Gómez
- Score: 6–4, 6–4

Events
Singles	men	women
Doubles	men	women
← 2021 ·	Lexington Challenger	· 2023 →

Jason Kubler was the defending champion but chose not to defend his title.

Shang Juncheng won the title after defeating Emilio Gómez 6–4, 6–4 in the final.

== Seeds ==
1. Roman Safiullin (quarterfinals)
2. (Ecuador) Emilio Gómez (final)
3. (Czech Republic) Dalibor Svrčina (first round)
4. (Netherlands) Gijs Brouwer (second round)
5. (Kazakhstan) Mikhail Kukushkin (second round)
6. (Argentina) Genaro Alberto Olivieri (first round)
7. (United States) Aleksandar Kovacevic (semifinals)
8. (France) Enzo Couacaud (semifinals)

== Draw ==
Key

- Q = Qualifier
- WC = Wild card
- LL = Lucky loser
- Alt = Alternate
- ITF = ITF entry
- PR = Protected ranking
- SR = Special ranking
- SE = Special exempt
- JE = Junior exempt
- JR = Junior Accelerator Programme entrant
- CO = College Accelerator Programme entrant
- NG = Next Gen Accelerator Program entrant
- w/o = Walkover
- r = Retired
- d = Defaulted

=== Finals ===
Semifinals
(China) Shang Juncheng	3	7^{7}	6
7/WC	(United States) Aleksandar Kovacevic	6	6^{5}	4
8	(France) Enzo Couacaud	6	4	6^{5}
2	(Ecuador) Emilio Gómez	4	6	7^{7}

Final
(China) Shang Juncheng	6	6
2	(Ecuador) Emilio Gómez	4	4

=== Top half ===
First round
1	R Safiullin	6	6
Q	(United States) A Ayeni	3	4
Alt	(Denmark) M Torpegaard	6	0	1^{r}
Alt	(India) M Sasikumar	3	6	4
Q	(United States) S Dostanic	0	6	3
(China) J Shang	6	4	6
WC	(United Kingdom) Millen Hurrion	0	6^{7}
5	(Kazakhstan) M Kukushkin	6	7^{9}
4	(Netherlands) G Brouwer	6	6
Q	(United States) Gage Brymer	4	1
(South Korea) Y-s Chung	2	7	1
(Ecuador) R Quiroz	6	5	6
(United Kingdom) A McHugh	3	6	3
(United Kingdom) B Harris	6	3	6
(United States) Z Svajda	5	1
7/WC	(United States) A Kovacevic	7	6

Second round
1	R Safiullin	6	7^{7}
Alt	(India) M Sasikumar	3	6^{3}
(China) J Shang	7^{7}	6
5	(Kazakhstan) M Kukushkin	6^{5}	3
4	(Netherlands) G Brouwer	4	4
(Ecuador) R Quiroz	6	6
(United Kingdom) B Harris	6^{5}	6	4
7/WC	(United States) A Kovacevic	7^{7}	1	6

Quarterfinals
1	R Safiullin	6	4	5
(China) J Shang	0	6	7
(Ecuador) R Quiroz	6	3	4
7/WC	(United States) A Kovacevic	4	6	6

Semifinals
(China) J Shang	3	7^{7}	6
7/WC	(United States) A Kovacevic	6	6^{5}	4

=== Bottom half ===
First round
8	(France) E Couacaud	6	6
WC	(United States) E Zhu	2	1
(United States) K Smith	6^{5}	6	6
(Australia) L Tu	7^{7}	0	3
(United States) B Holt	6	7^{7}
LL	(United States) Kyle Seelig	4	6^{5}
Alt	(United States) G Nanda	7^{10}	6
3	(Czech Republic) D Svrčina	6^{8}	1
6	(Argentina) GA Olivieri	1	1
Q	(United States) S Kirchheimer	6	6
(Lebanon) H Habib	3	4
(Colombia) N Mejía	6	6
(Canada) S Diez	6^{4}	2
Q	(United States) R Harrison	7^{7}	6
Q	(United States) C Kingsley	4	6	5
2	(Ecuador) E Gómez	6	3	7

Second round
8	(France) E Couacaud	6	6
(United States) K Smith	2	4
(United States) B Holt	7^{7}	4	2
Alt	(United States) G Nanda	6^{1}	6	6
Q	(United States) S Kirchheimer	6^{2}	6	3
(Colombia) N Mejía	7^{7}	3	6
Q	(United States) R Harrison	5	4
2	(Ecuador) E Gómez	7	6

Quarterfinals
8	(France) E Couacaud	3	6	6
Alt	(United States) G Nanda	6	1	2
(Colombia) N Mejía	4	5
2	(Ecuador) E Gómez	6	7

Semifinals
8	(France) E Couacaud	6	4	6^{5}
2	(Ecuador) E Gómez	4	6	7^{7}
