= 2022 Champaign–Urbana Challenger – Doubles =

Urbana Challenger – Doubles
- 2022 Champaign–Urbana Challenger

Final
- Champions: (United States) Robert Galloway (Mexico) Hans Hach Verdugo
- Runners-up: (United States) Ezekiel Clark (United States) Alfredo Perez
- Score: 3–6, 6–3, [10–5]

Events
| Singles | Doubles |
| ← 2021 · | Champaign–Urbana Challenger | · 2023 → |

Nathaniel Lammons and Jackson Withrow were the defending champions but chose not to defend their title.

Robert Galloway and Hans Hach Verdugo won the title after defeating Ezekiel Clark and Alfredo Perez 3–6, 6–3, [10–5] in the final.

== Seeds ==
1. (United States) Robert Galloway / (Mexico) Hans Hach Verdugo (champions)
2. (Philippines) Treat Huey / (United States) Alex Lawson (quarterfinals)
3. (India) Sriram Balaji / (India) Jeevan Nedunchezhiyan (semifinals)
4. (France) Théo Arribagé / (United Kingdom) Luke Johnson (semifinals)

== Draw ==
=== Key ===
- Q = Qualifier
- WC = Wild card
- LL = Lucky loser
- Alt = Alternate
- SE = Special exempt
- PR = Protected ranking
- ITF = ITF entry
- JE = Junior exempt
- w/o = Walkover
- r = Retired
- d = Defaulted
- SR = Special ranking

First round
1 | (United States) R Galloway (Mexico) H Hach Verdugo | 6 | 6
(Zimbabwe) B Lock (Zimbabwe) CJ Lock | 2 | 2
(Estonia) Johannes Seeman (United States) Wally Thayne | 4 | 1
(Latvia) M Lībietis (Switzerland) L Margaroli | 6 | 6
3 | (India) S Balaji (India) J Nedunchezhiyan | 3 | 6 | [10]
WC | (United States) Hunter Heck (United States) Lucas Horve | 6 | 2 | [7]
(India) A Chandrasekar (Australia) A Walton | 7^{10} | 7
(Denmark) A Holmgren (Denmark) J Ingildsen | 6^{8} | 5
(United States) A Kovacevic (United States) B Shelton | 6 | 6
(India) Sathi Reddy Chirala (India) VS Prashanth | 2 | 1
(United States) K Al Allaf (Ghana) Abraham Asaba | 2 | 4
4 | (France) T Arribagé (United Kingdom) L Johnson | 6 | 6
(Germany) S Fanselow (Germany) Lucas Gerch | 1 | 4
(United States) Ezekiel Clark (United States) A Perez | 6 | 6
WC | (France) Mathis Debru (United Kingdom) Oliver Okonkwo | 3 | 4
2 | (Philippines) T Huey (United States) A Lawson | 6 | 6

Quarterfinals
1 | (United States) R Galloway (Mexico) H Hach Verdugo | 6 | 6
(Latvia) M Lībietis (Switzerland) L Margaroli | 4 | 4
3 | (India) S Balaji (India) J Nedunchezhiyan | 7^{10} | 2 | [10]
(India) A Chandrasekar (Australia) A Walton | 6^{8} | 6 | [4]
(United States) A Kovacevic (United States) B Shelton | 3 | 6 | [2]
4 | (France) T Arribagé (United Kingdom) L Johnson | 6 | 3 | [10]
(United States) E Clark (United States) A Perez | 6 | 6^{5} | [10]
2 | (Philippines) T Huey (United States) A Lawson | 4 | 7^{7} | [5]

Semifinals
1 | (United States) R Galloway (Mexico) H Hach Verdugo | 7^{7} | 6
3 | (India) S Balaji (India) J Nedunchezhiyan | 6^{5} | 4
4 | (France) T Arribagé (United Kingdom) L Johnson | 5 | 6 | [11]
(United States) E Clark (United States) A Perez | 7 | 3 | [13]

Final
1 | (United States) R Galloway (Mexico) H Hach Verdugo | 3 | 6 | [10]
(United States) E Clark (United States) A Perez | 6 | 3 | [5]
