= 2026 Kurume International =

Tennis tournament

- Date: 11–17 May 2026
- Edition: 19th
- Category: ITF Women's World Tennis Tour
- Prize money: $60,000
- Surface: Carpet / Outdoor
- Location: Kurume, Japan

Champions

Singles
- (United Kingdom) Katie Swan

Doubles
- (Chinese Taipei) Lee Ya-hsin / (China) Ye Qiuyu
- Kurume Cup

The 2026 Kurume International was a professional tennis tournament play on outdoor carpet courts. It was the nineteenth edition of the tournament, which was part of the 2026 ITF Women's World Tennis Tour. It took place in Kurume, Japan, between 11 and 17 May 2026.

== Champions ==
=== Singles ===
- (United Kingdom) Katie Swan def. (Japan) Kyōka Okamura, 7–5, 6–1

=== Doubles ===
- (Chinese Taipei) Lee Ya-hsin / (China) Ye Qiuyu def. (Australia) Gabriella Da Silva-Fick / (Australia) Tenika McGiffin, 6–3, 6–2.

== Singles main draw entrants ==
=== Seeds ===
Country	Player	Rank	Seed
GBR	Katie Swan	269	1
CYP	Raluca Șerban	283	2
JPN	Kyōka Okamura	285	3
JPN	Mei Yamaguchi	293	4
JPN	Rina Saigo	300	5
AUS	Lizette Cabrera	305	6
JPN	Sara Saito	325	7
GBR	Lily Miyazaki	328	8

- Rankings are as of 4 May 2026.

=== Other entrants ===
The following players received wildcards into the singles main draw:

- (Japan) Chika Miyahara
- (Japan) Mina Miyahara
- (Japan) Remika Ohashi
- (Japan) Minori Yamataka

The following player received entry into the singles main draw using a special ranking:

- (United Kingdom) Katy Dunne

The following players received entry from the qualifying draw:

- (Japan) Natsuho Arakawa
- (Australia) Gabriella Da Silva-Fick
- (Japan) Nagi Hanatani
- (United States) Dalayna Hewitt
- (Japan) Sayaka Ishii
- (Japan) Rinko Matsuda
- (Japan) Junri Namigata
- (Japan) Kisa Yoshioka

The following player received entry as a lucky loser:

- (Japan) Anri Nagata
- (Japan) Yui Ohwaki
