= 2022 Lexington Challenger – Women's singles =

Women's singles
- 2022 Lexington Challenger

Final
- Champion: (United Kingdom) Katie Swan
- Runner-up: (United Kingdom) Jodie Burrage
- Score: 6–0, 3–6, 6–3

Events
Singles	men	women
Doubles	men	women
- Lexington Challenger

Jennifer Brady was the defending champion but chose not to participate.

Katie Swan won the title, defeating Jodie Burrage in the final, 6–0, 3–6, 6–3.

== Seeds ==
1. (Japan) Moyuka Uchijima (second round)
2. (United Kingdom) Jodie Burrage (final)
3. (France) Tessah Andrianjafitrimo (first round)
4. (Australia) Priscilla Hon (first round)
5. (Australia) Seone Mendez (first round)
6. (Israel) Lina Glushko (first round, retired)
7. (Australia) Lizette Cabrera (first round)
8. (United Kingdom) Katie Swan (champion)

== Draw ==
Key

- Q = Qualifier
- WC = Wild card
- LL = Lucky loser
- Alt = Alternate
- ITF = ITF entry
- PR = Protected ranking
- SR = Special ranking
- SE = Special exempt
- JE = Junior exempt
- JR = Junior Accelerator Programme entrant
- CO = College Accelerator Programme entrant
- NG = Next Gen Accelerator Program entrant
- w/o = Walkover
- r = Retired
- d = Defaulted

=== Finals ===
Semifinals
8	(United Kingdom) Katie Swan	6	7^{7}
(Mexico) Marcela Zacarías	2	6^{2}
Q	(United States) Peyton Stearns	6	4	3
2	(United Kingdom) Jodie Burrage	1	6	6

Final
8	(United Kingdom) Katie Swan	6	3	6
2	(United Kingdom) Jodie Burrage	0	6	3

=== Top half ===
First round
1	(Japan) M Uchijima	6	6
I Shymanovich	3	1
WC	(United States) M Sieg	3	6	3^{r}
Q	(United States) T Ng	6	1	4
(United States) K Scott	6	6
WC	(United States) S Crawford	3	4
(United States) C Van Nguyen	4	1
8	(United Kingdom) K Swan	6	6
3	(France) T Andrianjafitrimo	1	7	2
M Timofeeva	6	5	6
WC	(United States) Q Lopez	3	3
Q	V Miroshnichenko	6	6
Q	(United States) J Aney	6	3	2
Q	(Germany) J Tilbürger	1	6	6
(Mexico) M Zacarías	7	4
6	(Israel) L Glushko	5	0^{r}

Second round
1	(Japan) M Uchijima	7	6^{5}	3
Q	(United States) T Ng	5	7^{7}	6
(United States) K Scott	3	7	6^{6}
8	(United Kingdom) K Swan	6	5	7^{8}
M Timofeeva	4	0^{r}
Q	V Miroshnichenko	6	2
Q	(Germany) J Tilbürger	1	6^{4}
(Mexico) M Zacarías	6	7^{7}

Quarterfinals
Q	(United States) T Ng	2	1
8	(United Kingdom) K Swan	6	6
Q	V Miroshnichenko	2	4
(Mexico) M Zacarías	6	6

Semifinals
8	(United Kingdom) K Swan	6	7^{7}
(Mexico) M Zacarías	2	6^{2}

=== Bottom half ===
First round
5	(Australia) S Mendez	2	6^{2}
(India) K Thandi	6	7^{7}
Q	(United States) E Oosterhout	6	4	4
WC	(Indonesia) A Sutjiadi	4	6	6
Q	(United States) D Hewitt	5	2
Q	(United States) A Reami	7	6
Q	(United States) P Stearns	7^{7}	6
4	(Australia) P Hon	6^{2}	4
7	(Australia) L Cabrera	3	0
(United States) A Glatch	6	6
(United States) H Chang	6	4
(United States) D Lao	3	1^{r}
(United States) E Kalieva	2	6	6
(United Kingdom) E Silva	6	2	2
(Ukraine) K Volodko	7^{7}	0	1
2	(United Kingdom) J Burrage	6^{5}	6	6

Second round
(India) K Thandi	7	6
WC	(Indonesia) A Sutjiadi	5	0
Q	(United States) A Reami	7^{7}	3	4
Q	(United States) P Stearns	6^{1}	6	6
(United States) A Glatch	7^{7}	5	0
(United States) H Chang	6^{0}	7	6
(United States) E Kalieva	2	6^{8}
2	(United Kingdom) J Burrage	6	7^{10}

Quarterfinals
(India) K Thandi	3	1
Q	(United States) P Stearns	6	6
(United States) H Chang	3	1
2	(United Kingdom) J Burrage	6	6

Semifinals
Q	(United States) P Stearns	6	4	3
2	(United Kingdom) J Burrage	1	6	6
