= 2023 Champaign–Urbana Challenger – Doubles =

Urbana Challenger – Doubles
- 2023 Champaign–Urbana Challenger

Final
- Champions: (Australia) John-Patrick Smith (Netherlands) Sem Verbeek
- Runners-up: (United States) Lucas Horve (United Kingdom) Oliver Okonkwo
- Score: 6–2, 7–6^{(7–4)}

Events
Singles	Doubles
- Champaign–Urbana Challenger

Robert Galloway and Hans Hach Verdugo were the defending champions but only Hach Verdugo chose to defend his title, partnering Luis David Martínez. Hach Verdugo lost in the quarterfinals to Lucas Horve and Oliver Okonkwo.

John-Patrick Smith and Sem Verbeek won the title after defeating Horve and Okonkwo 6–2, 7–6^{(7–4)} in the final.

== Seeds ==
1. (Australia) John-Patrick Smith / (Netherlands) Sem Verbeek (champions)
2. (Mexico) Hans Hach Verdugo / (Venezuela) Luis David Martínez (quarterfinals)
3. (United States) Christian Harrison / (Latvia) Miķelis Lībietis (first round)
4. (United States) George Goldhoff / (United States) Alfredo Perez (semifinals)

== Draw ==
Key

- Q = Qualifier
- WC = Wild card
- LL = Lucky loser
- Alt = Alternate
- ITF = ITF entry
- PR = Protected ranking
- SR = Special ranking
- SE = Special exempt
- JE = Junior exempt
- JR = Junior Accelerator Programme entrant
- CO = College Accelerator Programme entrant
- NG = Next Gen Accelerator Program entrant
- w/o = Walkover
- r = Retired
- d = Defaulted

First round
1	(Australia) J-P Smith (Netherlands) S Verbeek	6	6
(France) M Westphal (United States) T Winegar	4	2
Alt	(India) Sathi Reddy Chirala (United States) A Kovacevic	4	4
(United States) Ezekiel Clark (United States) E Zhu	6	6
3	(United States) C Harrison (Latvia) M Lībietis	6^{7}	6	[8]
(Germany) M Rosenkranz (United States) Tennyson Whiting	7^{9}	4	[10]
(France) G Debru (France) Mathis Debru	3	6^{6}
(United States) A Rybakov (Spain) P Vives Marcos	6	7^{8}
(United States) S Kirchheimer (United States) K Smith	5	3
(United Kingdom) M Whitehouse (United Kingdom) M Willis	7	6
(Antigua and Barbuda) J Maginley (United States) J Sheehy	7^{8}	1	[5]
WC	(United States) Lucas Horve (United Kingdom) Oliver Okonkwo	6^{6}	6	[10]
WC	(United States) Hunter Heck (Latvia) K Ozoliņš	4	5
2	(Mexico) H Hach Verdugo (Venezuela) LD Martínez	6	7

Quarterfinals
1	(Australia) J-P Smith (Netherlands) S Verbeek	7	6
(United States) E Clark (United States) E Zhu	5	4
(Germany) M Rosenkranz (United States) T Whiting	4	7^{7}	[8]
(United States) A Rybakov (Spain) P Vives Marcos	6	6^{5}	[10]
(United Kingdom) M Whitehouse (United Kingdom) M Willis	3	4
4	(United States) G Goldhoff (United States) A Perez	6	6
WC	(United States) L Horve (United Kingdom) O Okonkwo	5	7	[10]
2	(Mexico) H Hach Verdugo (Venezuela) LD Martínez	7	5	[8]

Semifinals
1	(Australia) J-P Smith (Netherlands) S Verbeek	6	3	[10]
(United States) A Rybakov (Spain) P Vives Marcos	4	6	[7]
4	(United States) G Goldhoff (United States) A Perez	6^{3}	4
WC	(United States) L Horve (United Kingdom) O Okonkwo	7^{7}	6

Final
1	(Australia) J-P Smith (Netherlands) S Verbeek	6	7^{7}
WC	(United States) L Horve (United Kingdom) O Okonkwo	2	6^{4}
