= 2026 Kurume International – Doubles =

Doubles
- 2026 Kurume International

Final
- Champions: (Chinese Taipei) Lee Ya-hsin (China) Ye Qiuyu
- Runners-up: (Australia) Gabriella Da Silva-Fick (Australia) Tenika McGiffin
- Score: 6–3, 6–2

Events
Singles	Doubles
- Kurume Cup

Lee Ya-hsin and Ye Qiuyu won the title, defeating Gabriella Da Silva-Fick and Tenika McGiffin 6–3, 6–2 in the final.

Momoko Kobori and Ayano Shimizu were the defending champions, but chose to compete with different partners this year. Kobori partnered Kanako Morisaki, but lost in the quarterfinals to Natsumi Kawaguchi and Hiroko Kuwata. Shimizu partnered Eri Shimizu, but lost in the quarterfinals to Lee and Ye.

== Seeds ==
1. (United Kingdom) Emily Appleton / (United States) Dalayna Hewitt (quarterfinals)
2. (Japan) Momoko Kobori / (Japan) Kanako Morisaki (quarterfinals)
3. (Japan) Ayano Shimizu / (Japan) Eri Shimizu (quarterfinals)
4. (Australia) Alexandra Osborne / (China) Zheng Wushuang (first round)

== Draw ==
Key

- Q = Qualifier
- WC = Wild card
- LL = Lucky loser
- Alt = Alternate
- ITF = ITF entry
- PR = Protected ranking
- SR = Special ranking
- SE = Special exempt
- JE = Junior exempt
- JR = Junior Accelerator Programme entrant
- CO = College Accelerator Programme entrant
- NG = Next Gen Accelerator Program entrant
- w/o = Walkover
- r = Retired
- d = Defaulted

First round
1	(United Kingdom) E Appleton (United States) D Hewitt	6	3	[10]
(United Kingdom) K Dunne (United Kingdom) L Miyazaki	4	6	[5]
(Japan) S Ishii (Japan) Mi Mushika	6	6
WC	(Japan) Y Sugita (Japan) N Tanaka	0	0
3	(Japan) A Shimizu (Japan) E Shimizu	6	6
(Japan) Y Kitahara (Japan) R Matsuda	1	2
(Chinese Taipei) Y-hsi Lee (China) Q Ye	6	6
WC	(Japan) K Ito (Japan) K Sakaguchi	0	2
(Australia) G Da Silva-Fick (Australia) T McGiffin	6	6
WC	(Japan) M Muto (Japan) M Yamataka	0	1
(Japan) A Nagata (Japan) K Yoshioka	6	6
4	(Australia) A Osborne (China) W Zheng	2	4
(Japan) S Saito (Japan) M Yamaguchi	3	1
(Japan) N Kawaguchi (Japan) H Kuwata	6	6
(Japan) N Arakawa (Japan) H Satō	1	1
2	(Japan) M Kobori (Japan) K Morisaki	6	6

Quarterfinals
1	(United Kingdom) E Appleton (United States) D Hewitt	5	3
(Japan) S Ishii (Japan) Mi Mushika	7	6
3	(Japan) A Shimizu (Japan) E Shimizu	6^{3}	6	[5]
(Chinese Taipei) Y-hsi Lee (China) Q Ye	7^{7}	4	[10]
(Australia) G Da Silva-Fick (Australia) T McGiffin	6	7^{7}
(Japan) A Nagata (Japan) K Yoshioka	1	6^{3}
(Japan) N Kawaguchi (Japan) H Kuwata	7	6
2	(Japan) M Kobori (Japan) K Morisaki	5	3

Semifinals
(Japan) S Ishii (Japan) Mi Mushika	2	4
(Chinese Taipei) Y-hsi Lee (China) Q Ye	6	6
(Australia) G Da Silva-Fick (Australia) T McGiffin	2	6	[10]
(Japan) N Kawaguchi (Japan) H Kuwata	6	4	[7]

Final
(Chinese Taipei) Y-hsi Lee (China) Q Ye	6	6
(Australia) G Da Silva-Fick (Australia) T McGiffin	3	2
