= 2026 Kurume International – Singles =

Singles
- 2026 Kurume International

Final
- Champion: (United Kingdom) Katie Swan
- Runner-up: (Japan) Kyōka Okamura
- Score: 7–5, 6–1

Events
| Singles | Doubles |
- Kurume Cup

Zarina Diyas was the defending champion, but she announced her retirement in April 2026.

Katie Swan won the title, defeating Kyōka Okamura 7–5, 6–1 in the final.

== Seeds ==
1. (United Kingdom) Katie Swan (champion)
2. (Cyprus) Raluca Șerban (first round)
3. (Japan) Kyōka Okamura (final)
4. (Japan) Mei Yamaguchi (semifinals)
5. (Japan) Rina Saigo (first round)
6. (Australia) Lizette Cabrera (quarterfinals)
7. (Japan) Sara Saito (quarterfinals)
8. (United Kingdom) Lily Miyazaki (second round)

== Draw ==
Key

- Q = Qualifier
- WC = Wild card
- LL = Lucky loser
- Alt = Alternate
- ITF = ITF entry
- PR = Protected ranking
- SR = Special ranking
- SE = Special exempt
- JE = Junior exempt
- JR = Junior Accelerator Programme entrant
- CO = College Accelerator Programme entrant
- NG = Next Gen Accelerator Program entrant
- w/o = Walkover
- r = Retired
- d = Defaulted

=== Finals ===
Semifinals
1 | (United Kingdom) Katie Swan | 6 | 6
4 | (Japan) Mei Yamaguchi | 1 | 1
3 | (Japan) Kyōka Okamura | 6 | 6
(Japan) Momoko Kobori | 3 | 2

Final
1 | (United Kingdom) Katie Swan | 7 | 6
3 | (Japan) Kyōka Okamura | 5 | 1

=== Top half ===
First round
1 | (United Kingdom) K Swan | 6 | 6
WC | (Japan) C Miyahara | 0 | 0
WC | (Japan) R Ohashi | 3 | 1
Q | (United States) D Hewitt | 6 | 6
(Switzerland) V Ryser | 3 | 6 | 0
(Japan) A Shimizu | 6 | 4 | 6
Q | (Japan) N Arakawa | 2 | 3
7 | (Japan) S Saito | 6 | 6
4 | (Japan) M Yamaguchi | 3 | 6 | 7
(China) W Zheng | 6 | 2 | 5
(Japan) H Kaji | 6 | 6
(United Kingdom) E Appleton | 1 | 2
Q | (Japan) R Matsuda | 6 | 3 | 3
Q | (Japan) K Yoshioka | 3 | 6 | 6
SR | (United Kingdom) K Dunne | 4 | 7 | 2
6 | (Australia) L Cabrera | 6 | 5 | 6

Second round
1 | (United Kingdom) K Swan | 6 | 6^{4} | 6
Q | (United States) D Hewitt | 3 | 7^{7} | 3
(Japan) A Shimizu | 4 | 4
7 | (Japan) S Saito | 6 | 6
4 | (Japan) M Yamaguchi | 6 | 6
(Japan) H Kaji | 4 | 1
Q | (Japan) K Yoshioka | 3 | 7^{7} | 4
6 | (Australia) L Cabrera | 6 | 6^{4} | 6

Quarterfinals
1 | (United Kingdom) K Swan | 6 | 6
7 | (Japan) S Saito | 4 | 4
4 | (Japan) M Yamaguchi | 6 | 6
6 | (Australia) L Cabrera | 3 | 3

Semifinals
1 | (United Kingdom) K Swan | 6 | 6
4 | (Japan) M Yamaguchi | 1 | 1

=== Bottom half ===
First round
8 | (United Kingdom) L Miyazaki | 6 | 6
LL | (Japan) A Nagata | 0 | 1
(Japan) Mi Mushika | 6 | 6
Q | (Japan) J Namigata | 1 | 0
Q | (Japan) S Ishii | 6^{6} | 1
WC | (Japan) M Miyahara | 7^{8} | 6
Q | (Australia) G Da Silva-Fick | 2 | 4
3 | (Japan) K Okamura | 6 | 6
5 | (Japan) R Saigo | 6^{5} | 4
(Japan) N Kawaguchi | 7^{7} | 6
LL | (Japan) Y Ohwaki | 2 | 3
(Japan) E Shimizu | 6 | 6
WC | (Japan) M Yamataka | 3 | 2
Q | (Japan) N Hanatani | 6 | 6
(Japan) M Kobori | 6 | 4 | 6
2 | (Cyprus) R Șerban | 3 | 6 | 1

Second round
8 | (United Kingdom) L Miyazaki | 6 | 3 | 1
(Japan) Mi Mushika | 0 | 6 | 6
WC | (Japan) M Miyahara | 0 | 2
3 | (Japan) K Okamura | 6 | 6
(Japan) N Kawaguchi | 6 | 6
(Japan) E Shimizu | 0 | 3
Q | (Japan) N Hanatani | 0 | 3
(Japan) M Kobori | 6 | 6

Quarterfinals
(Japan) Mi Mushika | 3 | 3
3 | (Japan) K Okamura | 6 | 6
(Japan) N Kawaguchi | 6 | 3 | 5
(Japan) M Kobori | 3 | 6 | 7

Semifinals
3 | (Japan) K Okamura | 6 | 6
(Japan) M Kobori | 3 | 2
