= 2022 Lexington Challenger – Women's doubles =

Women's doubles
- 2022 Lexington Challenger

Final
- Champions: (Indonesia) Aldila Sutjiadi (Ukraine) Kateryna Volodko
- Runners-up: (United States) Jada Hart (United States) Dalayna Hewitt
- Score: 7–5, 6–3

Events
Singles	men	women
Doubles	men	women
- Lexington Challenger

Hayley Carter and Luisa Stefani were the defending champions but chose not to participate.

Aldila Sutjiadi and Kateryna Volodko won the title, defeating Jada Hart and Dalayna Hewitt in the final, 7–5, 6–3.

== Seeds ==
1. (Indonesia) Aldila Sutjiadi / (Ukraine) Kateryna Volodko (champions)
2. (Australia) Lizette Cabrera / (Mexico) Marcela Zacarías (first round)
3. (United States) Anna Rogers / (United States) Christina Rosca (quarterfinals)
4. Iryna Shymanovich / Maria Timofeeva (quarterfinals, withdrew)

== Draw ==
Key

- Q = Qualifier
- WC = Wild card
- LL = Lucky loser
- Alt = Alternate
- ITF = ITF entry
- PR = Protected ranking
- SR = Special ranking
- SE = Special exempt
- JE = Junior exempt
- JR = Junior Accelerator Programme entrant
- CO = College Accelerator Programme entrant
- NG = Next Gen Accelerator Program entrant
- w/o = Walkover
- r = Retired
- d = Defaulted

=== Draw ===
First round
1	(Indonesia) A Sutjiadi (Ukraine) K Volodko	6	6
WC	(United States) E Hammond (United States) J Mair	1	0
WC	(United States) E Myers (Argentina) MF Urrutia	4	6	[3]
(United States) P Corley (United States) R Newborn	6	1	[10]
3	(United States) A Rogers (United States) C Rosca	1	6	[10]
M Kozyreva; V Miroshnichenko	6	4	[7]
(Japan) H Kuwata (China) Y Ma	6	6
(United States) T Ng (United States) A Reami	3	4
(United States) S Daavettila (United States) J Failla
(United Kingdom) J Burrage (United Kingdom) E Silva	w/o
WC	(United States) C Beckman (United States) JA Bedard	0	2
4	I Shymanovich; M Timofeeva	6	6
(France) T Andrianjafitrimo (Australia) S Mendez	6^{7}	4
(United States) J Hart (United States) D Hewitt	7^{9}	6
(United States) E Cayetano (United States) P Stearns	6	6
2	(Australia) L Cabrera (Mexico) M Zacarías	1	4

Quarterfinals
1	(Indonesia) A Sutjiadi (Ukraine) K Volodko	6	6
(United States) P Corley (United States) R Newborn	1	4
3	(United States) A Rogers (United States) C Rosca	3	3
(Japan) H Kuwata (China) Y Ma	6	6
(United Kingdom) J Burrage (United Kingdom) E Silva	w/o
4	I Shymanovich; M Timofeeva
(United States) J Hart (United States) D Hewitt	6	6
(United States) E Cayetano (United States) P Stearns	1	4

Semifinals
1	(Indonesia) A Sutjiadi (Ukraine) K Volodko	6	6
(Japan) H Kuwata (China) Y Ma	4	4
(United Kingdom) J Burrage (United Kingdom) E Silva	3	3
(United States) J Hart (United States) D Hewitt	6	6

Final
1	(Indonesia) A Sutjiadi (Ukraine) K Volodko	7	6
(United States) J Hart (United States) D Hewitt	5	3
