= 2022 Champaign–Urbana Challenger =

- Date: 14 November – 20 November
- Edition: 26th
- Surface: Hard (Indoor)
- Location: Champaign, Illinois, United States

Champions

Singles
- (United States) Ben Shelton

Doubles
- (United States) Robert Galloway / (Mexico) Hans Hach Verdugo
| ← 2021 · | Champaign–Urbana Challenger | · 2023 → |

The 2022 Paine Schwartz Partners Challenger was a professional tennis tournament played on hard courts. It was the 26th edition of the tournament which was part of the 2022 ATP Challenger Tour. It took place in Champaign, Illinois, United States between November 14 and November 20, 2022.

== Singles main-draw entrants ==
=== Seeds ===
| Country | Player | Rank^{1} | Seed |
|---|---|---|---|
| USA | Denis Kudla | 104 | 1 |
| USA | Steve Johnson | 108 | 2 |
| USA | Christopher Eubanks | 120 | 3 |
| USA | Ben Shelton | 128 | 4 |
| USA | Stefan Kozlov | 159 | 5 |
| AUS | Aleksandar Vukic | 165 | 6 |
| USA | Aleksandar Kovacevic | 177 | 7 |
| CHN | Shang Juncheng | 184 | 8 |

- ^{1} Rankings are as of November 7, 2022.

=== Other entrants ===
The following players received wildcards into the singles main draw:

- (France) Mathis Debru
- (United States) Hunter Heck
- (Latvia) Kārlis Ozoliņš

The following players received entry from the qualifying draw:

- (Denmark) August Holmgren
- (United States) Strong Kirchheimer
- (United States) Patrick Kypson
- (Spain) Iñaki Montes de la Torre
- (United States) Alexander Petrov
- (United States) Ethan Quinn

The following player received entry as a lucky loser:

- (United States) Evan Zhu

== Champions ==
=== Singles ===
- (United States) Ben Shelton def. (Australia) Aleksandar Vukic 0–6, 6–3, 6–2.

=== Doubles ===
- (United States) Robert Galloway / (Mexico) Hans Hach Verdugo def. (United States) Ezekiel Clark / (United States) Alfredo Perez 3–6, 6–3, [10–5].
