= 2024 Champaign–Urbana Challenger =

- Date: 11 – 17 November
- Edition: 28th
- Surface: Hard (indoor)
- Location: Champaign, Illinois, United States

Champions

Singles
- (United States) Ethan Quinn

Doubles
- (United States) Evan King / (United States) Reese Stalder
← 2023 ·	Champaign–Urbana Challenger	· 2025 →

The 2024 Paine Schwartz Partners Challenger was a professional tennis tournament played on hardcourts. It was the 28th edition of the tournament which was part of the 2024 ATP Challenger Tour. It took place in Champaign, Illinois, United States between November 11 and November 17, 2024.

== Singles main-draw entrants ==
=== Seeds ===
Country	Player	Rank^{1}	Seed
AUS	Adam Walton	90	1
USA	Christopher Eubanks	118	2
USA	Learner Tien	121	3
USA	Mitchell Krueger	145	4
USA	Nishesh Basavareddy	170	5
USA	Patrick Kypson	182	6
EST	Mark Lajal	229	7
KAZ	Beibit Zhukayev	233	8

- ^{1} Rankings are as of November 4, 2024.

=== Other entrants ===
The following players received wildcards into the singles main draw:

- (Japan) Kenta Miyoshi
- (United States) William Mroz
- (Australia) Jeremy Zhang

The following player received entry into the singles main draw as an alternate:

- (United States) Tyler Zink

The following players received entry from the qualifying draw:

- Martin Borisiouk
- (United States) Micah Braswell
- (United States) Ezekiel Clark
- (United States) Felix Corwin
- (United States) Strong Kirchheimer
- (United States) Alex Rybakov

== Champions ==
=== Singles ===
- (United States) Ethan Quinn def. (United States) Nishesh Basavareddy 6–3, 6–1.

=== Doubles ===
- (United States) Evan King / (United States) Reese Stalder def. (United Kingdom) James Davis / (United Kingdom) James MacKinlay 7–6^{(7–3)}, 7–5.
