= Shang Juncheng =

Chinese tennis player (born 2005)

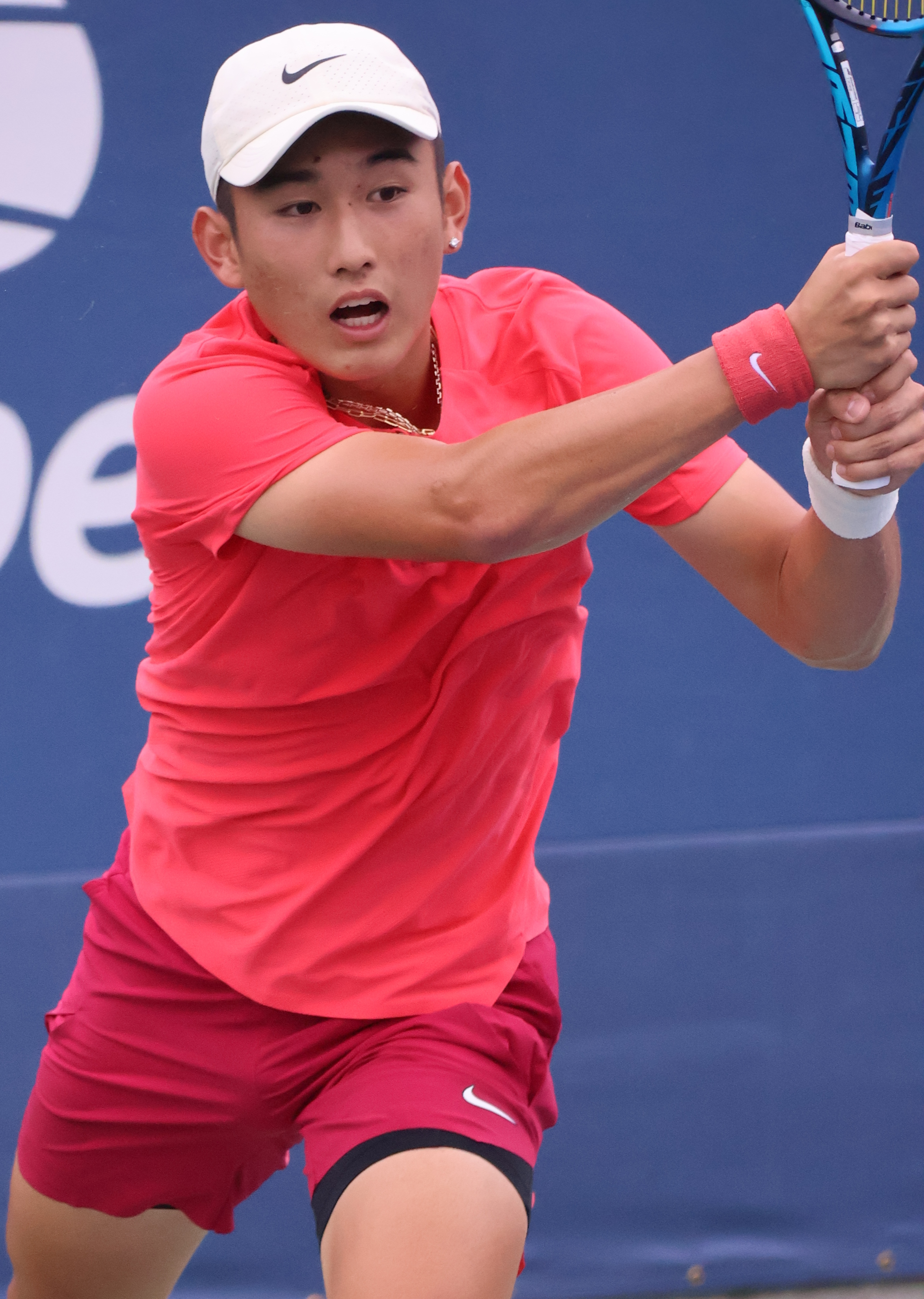
- Shang at the 2023 US Open
- Country (sports): China
- Residence: Bradenton, Florida, U.S.
- Born: 2 February 2005 (age 21) Beijing, China
- Height: 1.80 m (5 ft 11 in)
- Turned pro: 2021
- Plays: Left-handed (two-handed backhand)
- Coach: Martín Alund (2022–)
- Prize money: US $3,118,646

Singles
- Career record: 41–50
- Career titles: 1
- Highest ranking: No. 47 (21 October 2024)
- Current ranking: No. 252 (9 November 2026)

Grand Slam singles results
- Australian Open: 3R (2024)
- French Open: 1R (2023)
- Wimbledon: 2R (2024)
- US Open: 3R (2024)

Doubles
- Career record: 4–5
- Career titles: 0
- Highest ranking: No. 257 (9 November 2026)
- Current ranking: No. 257 (9 November 2026)

Grand Slam doubles results
- Australian Open: 1R (2026)
- US Open: 2R (2026)
- French Open Junior: 2R (2021)
- Wimbledon Junior: 2R (2021)
- US Open Junior: 1R (2021)
- Last updated on: 9 November 2026.

Shang Juncheng
- Simplified Chinese: 商竣程
- Traditional Chinese: 商竣程
Transcriptions
Standard Mandarin
- Hanyu Pinyin: Shāng Jùnchéng

Shang Juncheng (Chinese: 商竣程, also known as Jerry Shang; born 2 February 2005) is a Chinese professional tennis player. He reached a career-high ATP singles ranking of world No. 47 on 21 October 2024 and a doubles ranking of world No. 257 achieved on 9 November 2026. He is currently the No. 4 singles player from China. In July 2021, he reached No. 1 in the ITF junior rankings.

== Personal life ==
Shang currently trains and lives at the IMG Academy in Bradenton, Florida. He is coached by Martin Alund.

Shang is the son of former national footballer Shang Yi and former table tennis world champion Wu Na.

== Career ==
=== 2019: First ITF Junior title ===
In 2019, Shang was the first player born in 2005 to win a tournament on the ITF Junior Circuit.

=== 2021: Major Junior finalist ===
Shang played in the French Open and reached the quarterfinals, in which he lost to Sean Cuenin in two sets. He also played in the Wimbledon Junior Event and reached the semifinals. He lost to Victor Lilov in two sets. In the US Open Junior Event, he reached the final and lost to Daniel Rincón in two sets (2–6, 6–7^{6}).

=== 2022: ATP and historic Masters and top 200 debuts ===
Shang made his debut on the professional tour, after receiving a wildcard to play in the main draw of the ATP Tour 500 event at the 2022 Rio Open, after Juan Martín del Potro announced his retirement from professional tennis. Shang was defeated by Pedro Martínez in the first round. He received a wildcard into the qualifying draw of Indian Wells, where he beat Francisco Cerúndolo in the first round and his opponent Mats Moraing retired in the second. Having qualified into the main draw, he became the first Chinese man to play at Indian Wells and the first player from his country to qualify for an ATP Masters 1000. He was defeated by Jaume Munar in straight sets. He also received a wildcard for the main draw at the 2022 Miami Open.

He won his first title in Lexington, United States becoming the youngest Chinese player to win a trophy in the Challenger Tour history and the youngest since Carlos Alcaraz in 2020 Alicante. He reached the top 200 at world No. 195 on 19 September 2022.

=== 2023: Historic Grand Slam debut and first win, top 150 ===
Shang made his Grand Slam debut by qualifying at the Australian Open, after defeating Fábián Marozsán, 16th seed Fernando Verdasco and Zsombor Piros, becoming the youngest male player at the tournament and the youngest Grand Slam men's qualifier since 17-year-old Carlos Alcaraz at the 2021 Australian Open. He became the 10th mainland Chinese player to reach the main draw at this Major in 2023. It was the first time a male Chinese trio was set to compete in a major singles draw in the Open era (since 1968) and the first in all of Australian Open history (since 1905). Shang defeated Oscar Otte in the first round, becoming the first Chinese male player to win a match at the Australian Open in the Open Era. He then lost in straight sets to Frances Tiafoe in the second round. He received a wildcard for the main draw at the 2023 Miami Open. At the French Open, he qualified for his second Grand Slam in a row by defeating Pablo Cuevas, Marozsán and Renzo Olivo.

He reached the top 150 on 17 July 2023. The following week, he competed at the 2023 Atlanta Open where he lost to Kei Nishikori in the second round and his second ATP 500 in Washington D.C. defeating Emilio Gómez and 14th seed Ben Shelton before losing to second seed Frances Tiafoe.

Shang played his first ATP tour event in his homeland at the 2023 Zhuhai Championships where he lost to Mackenzie McDonald. He received a wildcard for the next Asian tournaments the China Open in Beijing, where he lost to Japanese Yoshihito Nishioka, and the 2023 Rolex Shanghai Masters, where he lost to Japanese Yosuke Watanuki, both in the first round.

=== 2024: Maiden ATP title, second Chinese titlist in Open Era, Major third rounds, top 50 ===
Having received a wildcard for the 2024 ATP Hong Kong Tennis Open tournament, Shang reached his first ATP quarterfinal with a win over seventh seed Laslo Djere, and then Botic van de Zandschulp in a 3 and 1/2 hours, close match with three tiebreaks 6–7(5) 7–6(2) 7–6(2). Next, he defeated third seed Frances Tiafoe in straight sets to reach his first career ATP semifinal before losing to eventual champion, Andrey Rublev, in a three-set match.

He received a wildcard for the Australian Open where he defeated Mackenzie McDonald in the first round and qualifier Sumit Nagal in the second to reach the third round of a Major for the first time in his career. He retired in the third set in his next match against world No. 2 Carlos Alcaraz. In March, he qualified for the 2024 BNP Paribas Open defeating Yoshihito Nishioka and Facundo Bagnis and recorded his first Masters main draw win over Jordan Thompson after a fifth match point. He was awarded a wildcard into the main draw at the 2024 Miami Open and in April, he also received a wildcard for the 2024 Madrid Open where he defeated qualifier Corentin Moutet in a four hour epic match. At the 2024 Italian Open he replaced 13th seed Ugo Humbert as a lucky loser directly in the second round. He reached the top 100 at world No. 89 on 20 May 2024, becoming the first Chinese teenager to accomplish the feat in ATP Rankings history (since 1973).

At the 2024 Atlanta Open he reached his second ATP semifinal of his career as a qualifier, defeating two Americans, wildcard Andres Martin, and top seed Ben Shelton, and then eighth seed Max Purcell. As a result, he reached the top 75 in the rankings on 29 July 2024. He reached another Grand Slam third round at the US Open with wins over 27th seed Alexander Bublik and Roberto Carballés Baena and entered the top 70 in the rankings on 9 September 2024. At the 2024 Chengdu Open, he defeated wildcard Kei Nishikori in the first round. Next, he upset eight seed Roman Safiullin, second seed Alexander Bublik, and Yannick Hanfmann to reach his first ATP Tour final, moving to the top 55 in the rankings on 23 September 2024. He defeated Lorenzo Musetti in the final to claim his maiden ATP Tour title becoming only the second Chinese mens titlist in the Open Era after Wu Yibing. On 14 October 2024, after a second-round showing in Shanghai, Shang reached world No. 49, becoming the first man born in 2005 or later to reach the Top 50 in ATP rankings history.

=== 2025: Hiatus, surgery, out of top 250, first top 10 win ===
Shang began his season at the ATP 250 Hong Kong Open, where he defeated Coleman Wong, Pedro Martínez, and Fábián Marozsán en route to the semi-finals, where he retired against Kei Nishikori due to illness. In January, he entered the 2025 Australian Open, but was forced to retire in his first-round match against Alejandro Davidovich Fokina. In March, he announced via Instagram that he had undergone surgery on his right foot.

He returned to the professional tour in July at the 2025 National Bank Open , but lost to James Duckworth. This was followed by two more first round losses at the 2025 Cincinnati Open and the US Open, to Tomas Martin Etcheverry and Mattia Bellucci respectively. In September, Shang reached the round of 16 in Chengdu, and lost in the first round of the China Open. His form saw resurgence when he recorded his first top 10 win at the 2025 Rolex Shanghai Masters as a wildcard, defeating world No. 10 Karen Khachanov, before losing to Nuno Borges in the third round.

== Performance timeline ==
Key
W	F	SF	QF	#R	RR	Q#	DNQ	A	NH

(W) winner; (F) finalist; (SF) semifinalist; (QF) quarterfinalist; (#R) rounds 4, 3, 2, 1; (RR) round-robin stage; (Q#) qualification round; (DNQ) did not qualify; (A) absent; (NH) not held; (SR) strike rate (events won / competed); (W–L) win–loss record.
To avoid confusion and double counting, these charts are updated at the conclusion of a tournament or when the player's participation has ended.

=== Singles ===
Tournament	2021	2022	2023	2024	2025	2026	SR	W–L	Win %
Grand Slam tournaments
Australian Open	A	A	2R	3R	1R	2R	0 / 4	4–4	50%
French Open	A	A	1R	Q1	A	A	0 / 1	0–1	0%
Wimbledon	A	A	Q1	2R	A	A	0 / 1	1–1	50%
US Open	A	A	Q3	3R	1R	1R	0 / 3	3–3	50%
Win–loss	0–0	0–0	1–2	5–3	0–2	1–2	0 / 8	7–9	44%
ATP Masters 1000
Indian Wells Open	A	1R	Q2	2R	A	A	0 / 2	1–2	33%
Miami Open	Q1	1R	1R	2R	A	A	0 / 3	1–3	25%
Monte Carlo Masters	A	A	A	A	A		0 / 0	0–0	–
Madrid Open	A	Q1	A	2R	A		0 / 1	1–1	50%
Italian Open	A	A	A	2R	A		0 / 1	0–1	0%
Canadian Open	A	A	A	A	1R	3R	0 / 2	2–2	50%
Cincinnati Masters	A	A	A	A	1R		0 / 1	0–1	0%
Shanghai Masters	NH		1R	2R	3R		0 / 3	3–3	50%
Paris Masters	A	A	A	1R	A		0 / 1	0–1	0%
Win–loss	0–0	0–2	0–2	4–6	2–3		0 / 13	6–13	32%

== ATP Tour finals ==
=== Singles: 1 (title) ===
Legend Grand Slam (0–0) ATP 1000 (0–0) ATP 500 (0–0) ATP 250 (1–0)	Finals by surface Hard (1–0) Clay (0–0) Grass (0–0)	Finals by setting Outdoor (1–0) Indoor (0–0)

Result	W–L	Date	Tournament	Tier	Surface	Opponent	Score
Win	1–0	Sep 2024	Chengdu Open, China	ATP 250	Hard	(Italy) Lorenzo Musetti	7–6^{(7–4)}, 6–1

== ATP Challenger Tour finals ==
=== Singles: 2 (1 title, 1 runner-up) ===
Legend ATP Challenger Tour (1–1)

Result	W–L	Date	Tournament	Tier	Surface	Opponent	Score
Win	1–0	Aug 2022	Lexington Challenger, US	Challenger	Hard	(Ecuador) Emilio Gómez	6–4, 6–4
Loss	1–1	Aug 2022	Championnats de Granby, Canada	Challenger	Hard	(Canada) Gabriel Diallo	5–7, 6–7^{(5–7)}

== ITF World Tennis Tour finals ==
=== Singles: 4 (4 titles) ===
Legend ITF WTT (4–0)	Finals by surface Hard (1–0) Clay (3–0)

Result	W–L	Date	Tournament	Tier	Surface	Opponent	Score
Win	1–0	Sep 2021	M15 Fayetteville, US	WTT	Hard	(United Kingdom) Mark Whitehouse	6–3, 6–0
Win	2–0	Oct 2021	M15 Naples, US	WTT	Clay	(Portugal) Duarte Vale	6–3, 7–6^{(7–3)}
Win	3–0	Oct 2021	M15 Vero Beach, US	WTT	Clay	(Venezuela) Ricardo Rodríguez-Pace	7–6^{(8–6)}, 6–4
Win	4–0	Feb 2022	M15 Naples, US	WTT	Clay	(United States) Felix Corwin	7–6^{(7–4)}, 7–6^{(7–1)}

== Junior Grand Slam finals ==
=== Singles: 1 (runner-up) ===
Result	Year	Tournament	Surface	Opponent	Score
Loss	2021	US Open	Hard	(Spain) Daniel Rincón	2–6, 6–7^{(6–8)}

== Wins against Top 10 players ==
- Shang has a 1–6 (14.29%) record against players who were, at the time the match was played, ranked in the top 10.

Season	2025	Total
Wins	1	1

#	Player	Rk	Event	Surface	Rd	Score	Rk	Ref
2025
1.	Karen Khachanov	10	Shanghai Masters, China	Hard	2R	7–6^{(7–3)}, 6–3	237	

- Key: (Rk) first use, opponent rank; (Rd) round; (Rk) 2nd use, player rank; (Ref) reference; (F) final; (SF) semifinal; (QF) quarterfinal; (#R) rounds 4, 3, 2, 1; (RR) round-robin stage; (Q#) qualifying rounds or stages (3), 2, 1.

Awards and achievements
Preceded by (Argentina) Thiago Agustín Tirante	ITF Junior World Champion; 2021	Succeeded by (Belgium) Gilles-Arnaud Bailly
