= 2023 Champaign–Urbana Challenger =

- Date: 13 – 19 November
- Edition: 27th
- Surface: Hard (Indoor)
- Location: Champaign, Illinois, United States

Champions

Singles
- (United States) Patrick Kypson

Doubles
- (Australia) John-Patrick Smith / (Netherlands) Sem Verbeek
← 2022 ·	Champaign–Urbana Challenger	· 2024 →

The 2023 Paine Schwartz Partners Challenger was a professional tennis tournament played on hard courts. It was the 27th edition of the tournament which was part of the 2023 ATP Challenger Tour. It took place in Champaign, Illinois, United States between November 13 and November 19, 2023.

== Singles main-draw entrants ==
=== Seeds ===
Country	Player	Rank^{1}	Seed
USA	Aleksandar Kovacevic	112	1
USA	Alex Michelsen	114	2
USA	Emilio Nava	153	3
FRA	Titouan Droguet	165	4
USA	Denis Kudla	183	5
KAZ	Beibit Zhukayev	195	6
USA	Patrick Kypson	241	7
USA	Martin Damm	269	8

- ^{1} Rankings are as of November 6, 2023.

=== Other entrants ===
The following players received wildcards into the singles main draw:

- (Japan) Kenta Miyoshi
- (Latvia) Kārlis Ozoliņš
- (United States) Ethan Quinn

The following players received entry into the singles main draw as alternates:

- Evgeny Karlovskiy
- (United States) Stefan Kozlov
- (Germany) Mats Rosenkranz

The following players received entry from the qualifying draw:

- (United States) Hunter Heck
- (Spain) Iñaki Montes de la Torre
- (United States) Alfredo Perez
- (United States) Alex Rybakov
- (United Kingdom) Mark Whitehouse
- (United States) Cooper Williams

== Champions ==
=== Singles ===
- (United States) Patrick Kypson def. (United States) Alex Michelsen 6–4, 6–3.

=== Doubles ===
- (Australia) John-Patrick Smith / (Netherlands) Sem Verbeek def. (United States) Lucas Horve / (United Kingdom) Oliver Okonkwo 6–2, 7–6^{(7–4)}.
