= Katie Swan =

British tennis player (born 1999)

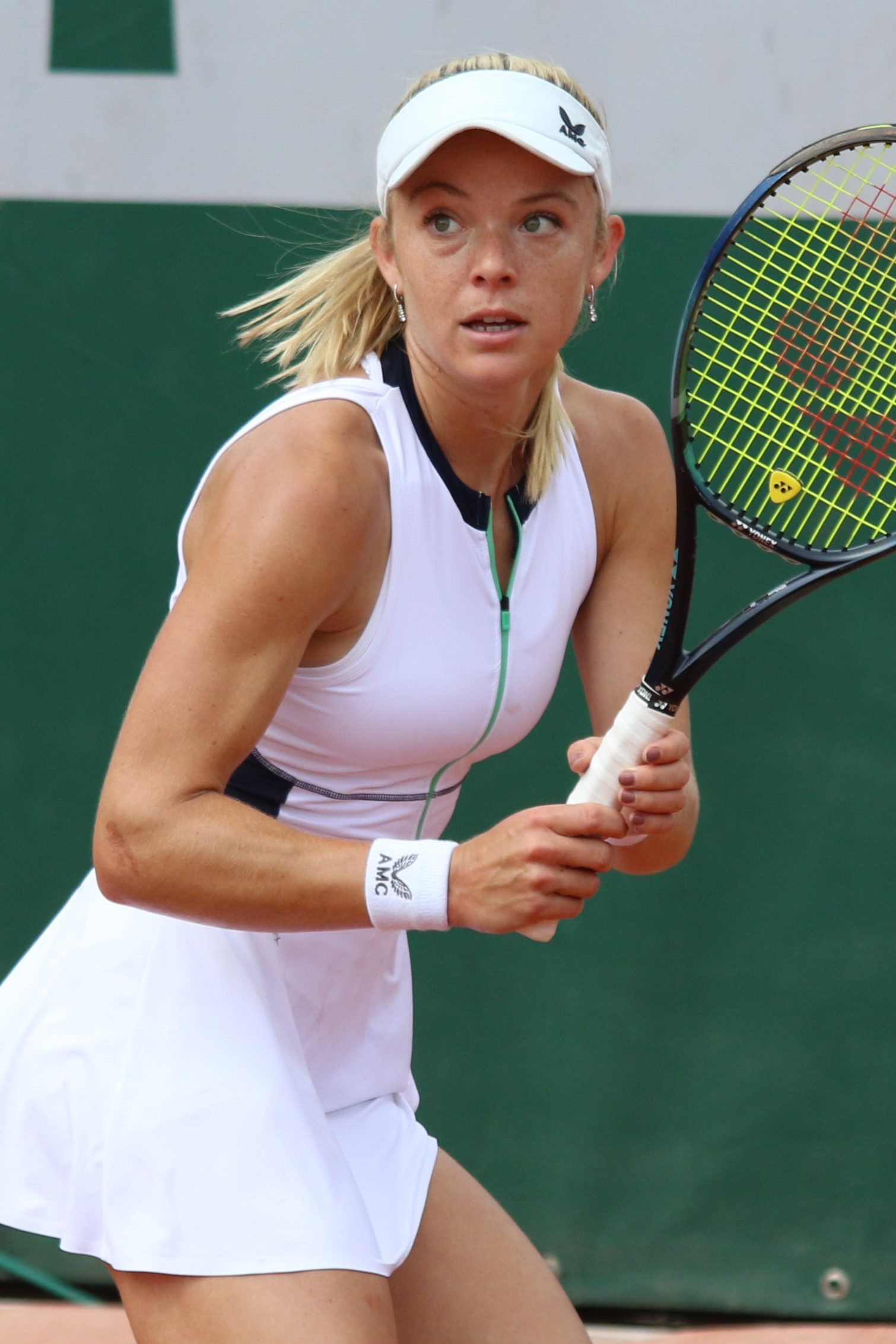
- Swan at the 2023 French Open
- Country (sports): Great Britain
- Residence: Wichita, Kansas, US
- Born: 24 March 1999 (age 27) Bristol, England
- Height: 1.74 m (5 ft 9 in)
- Turned pro: 2016
- Plays: Right (two-handed backhand)
- Prize money: US$ 1,222,764

Singles
- Career record: 276–159
- Career titles: 20 ITF
- Highest ranking: No. 118 (10 October 2022)
- Current ranking: No. 148 (9 November 2026)

Grand Slam singles results
- Australian Open: Q2 (2022)
- French Open: Q3 (2019)
- Wimbledon: 2R (2018, 2026)
- US Open: Q3 (2018)

Doubles
- Career record: 59–52
- Career titles: 1 ITF
- Highest ranking: No. 293 (26 February 2018)
- Current ranking: No. 892 (9 November 2026)

Grand Slam doubles results
- Wimbledon: 1R (2017, 2018)

Grand Slam mixed doubles results
- Wimbledon: 1R (2017, 2026)

Team competitions
- Fed Cup: 4–3
- Last updated on: 9 November 2026.

Katie Swan (born 24 March 1999) is a British tennis player. She has won 20 ITF singles titles and one in doubles. Her peak world ranking in singles is 118 and her highest in doubles is 293. When she made her debut, Swan was the youngest player to represent Great Britain in the Fed Cup.

== Personal life ==
Swan was born in Bristol, to parents Nicki and Richard. Whilst on holiday in Portugal when she was seven, she took tennis lessons. Her teacher had once played for Portugal and told her parents that she showed real talent and could represent her country in the future.

Swan was head girl at Bristol prep The Downs School and a keen hockey player, representing Avon and her school when they qualified for the under-13 national finals. She briefly attended Bristol Grammar School until the family moved to Wichita, Kansas (U.S.) in 2013 due to her father's job in the oil industry. Swan was one of the very few junior players on the competitive circuit who continued in school, Wichita Collegiate School, though from August 2015 she took online classes.

Since 2013, Swan has been based in Wichita.

She is in a relationship with Australian professional tennis player Alex Bolt.

== Career ==
=== Juniors ===
In 2009, Swan won her first international tournament in Croatia, the prestigious Smrikve Bowl event for 10-year-olds, and went on to win an under-10s international title.

In 2014, she was a member of the four-strong GB squad, coached by Judy Murray, that triumphed in the Maureen Connolly Challenge Trophy, an annual under-18s competition, against the US team.

On 30 January 2015, Swan defeated Dalma Gálfi, after facing three match points to reach her first junior major final at the Australian Open, which she lost in straight sets to Tereza Mihalíková.

=== Professional ===
==== 2015: First ITF Circuit title ====
In March, just before her 16th birthday, Swan achieved her first victories on the senior tour, coming through the qualifying draw to win a ITF tournament in Sharm El Sheikh. She defeated seventh seed Julia Terziyska in the final, having overcome two other seeded players in earlier rounds.

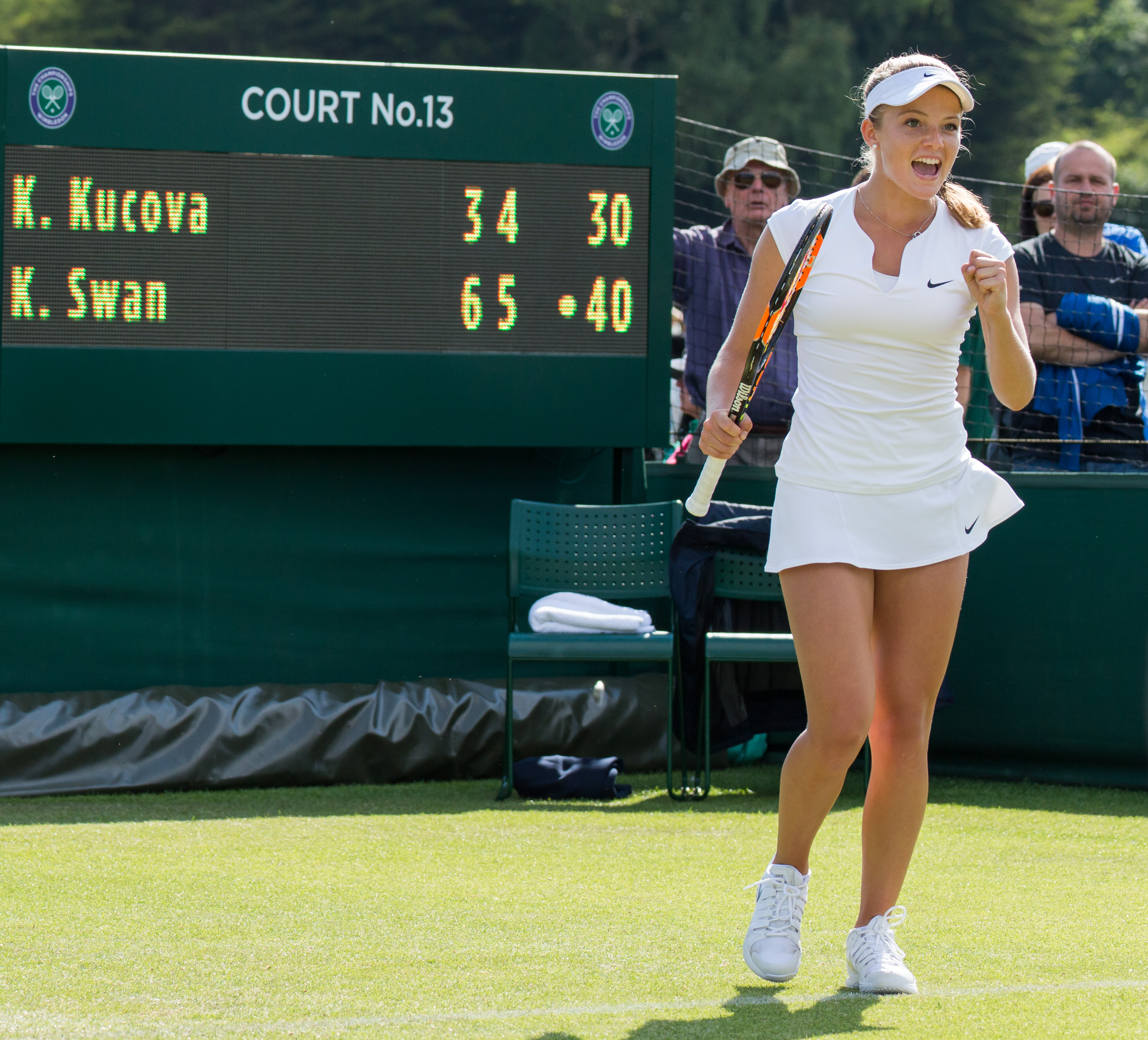
Swan celebrating her win over Kristína Kučová in 2015

In June, Swan competed in the Wimbledon qualifying, after being granted a wildcard entry, defeating world No. 118, Kristína Kučová, in the first round, in straight sets but lost to Tamira Paszek in the second.

==== 2016: Youngest British Fed Cup player, Wimbledon debut ====
In February, Swan made her Fed Cup debut for Great Britain in their Euro/Africa Zone Group 1 tie against South Africa. She became the youngest British player in Fed Cup history at the age of 16 years and 316 days, surpassing the record of Anne Keothavong by 270 days. Swan defeated Ilze Hattingh in straight sets in the opening match of the tie which Great Britain went on to win 3–0.

She received a wildcard into the main draw at Wimbledon. Swan lost in the first round to world No. 35, Tímea Babos, in straight sets. At the same event she retired due to injury in the first round of the girls' singles.

==== 2017–18: Wimbledon second round ====
Following recurring injury problems which began in late 2016 and persisted into early 2017, Swan returned at the Soho Square Future in Sharm El Sheikh, winning the $15k tournament by defeating Pemra Özgen in the final in straight sets. In March 2017, she claimed another tournament win, again at Sharm El Sheikh, overcoming Julia Wachaczyk in the final and putting her into the top-10 of British female players.

In October 2017, Swan won her first $25k tournament, when fellow Briton Katie Boulter retired during the first set of the final.

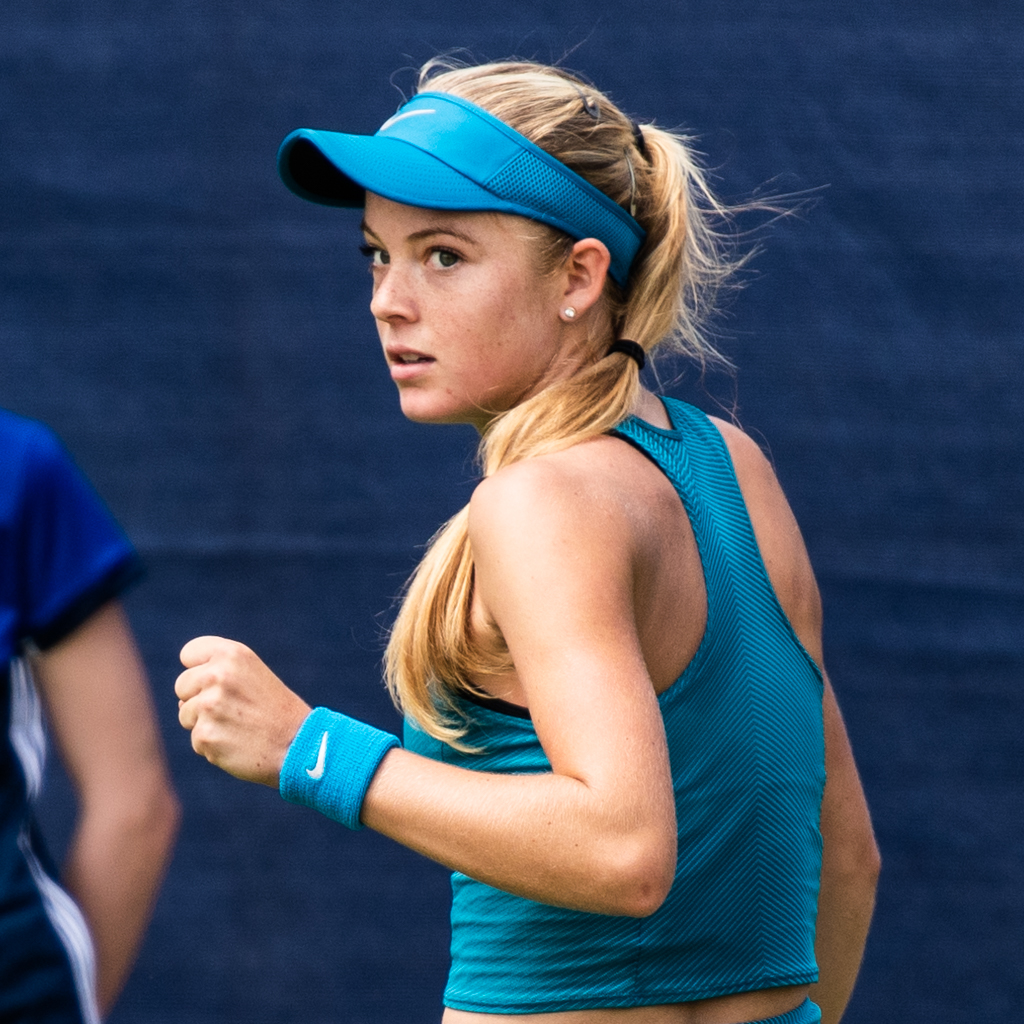
Swan in 2018

At the start of the 2018, it was announced that Swan had joined Andy Murray's "77 Sports Management" with a statement from him saying: "Katie is a player I've been watching for a while. She's got great potential and has already had some good results. I'm hoping we can offer support to her in areas on and off the court and complement the team she has in place already." She subsequently added Heather Watson's former coach, Diego Veronelli, to share responsibilities with her existing coach, Julien Picot.

In May 2018, Swan won her second $25k tournament without dropping a set at the Torneo Conchita Martínez in Monzón, Spain. In June 2018, she won two rounds in qualifying at the Nottingham Open, to reach the main draw of a WTA Tour event by right for the first time, earlier appearances having relied on wildcards. Swan lost to Mona Barthel in the first round.

After receiving another wildcard for Wimbledon in July 2018, Swan defeated world No. 36, Irina-Camelia Begu, to reach the second round, at which point she lost to 29th seed Mihaela Buzărnescu.

==== 2019–2021: Mixed fortunes ====
In January 2019, Swan entered qualifying at the Australian Open for the first time, however, she retired due to injury against Bianca Andreescu.

She made it to the final round of qualifying for the 2019 French Open, before losing in straight sets to Kristína Kučová. Awarded a wildcard entry at the 2019 Wimbledon Championships, Swan was defeated by Laura Siegemund in the first round. She won the $25k Paf Open in Haabneeme in November 2021.

In February 2021, she won a $25k event in Orlando. Swan qualified for the 2021 Wimbledon Championships, defeating Arina Rodionova in the final qualifying round. In the first round of the main draw, she lost to 23rd seed Madison Keys.

==== 2022: Chennai Open semifinal ====
At the qualifying tournament of the Australian Open, Swan defeated Abbie Myers in the first round, but lost to Viktoriya Tomova in the second.

In February, she defeated Sachia Vickery at the $25k event in Santo Domingo to win her 10th title on the ITF Circuit and sixth at $25k level.

During grass-court season, Swan made the round of 16 at the Bad Homburg Open, after entering as a qualifier. She defeated former US Open champion Sloane Stephens from a set down, before losing to another former US Open champion, eventual finalist Bianca Andreescu, in the second round.

Swan was awarded a wildcard for Wimbledon where she lost in three sets to Marta Kostyuk in the first round. In August, she won her first $60k event at the Lexington Challenger, defeating fellow Briton Jodie Burrage in three sets in the final.

In September, she reached her first semifinal at the Chennai Open with wins over Arianne Hartono, Anastasia Gasanova and qualifier Nao Hibino. However, she was forced to retire from her last four match against third seed Magda Linette due to illness.

==== 2023: WTA 1000 debut, Surbiton final ====
Swan made her WTA 1000 debut in Indian Wells as a qualifier where she lost to Cristina Bucșa in round one. She reached the final at the grass court Surbiton Trophy, losing to Yanina Wickmayer in a third set tiebreaker. After receiving a wildcard entry into the tournament, Swan lost in the first round at Wimbledon to 14th seed Belinda Bencic.

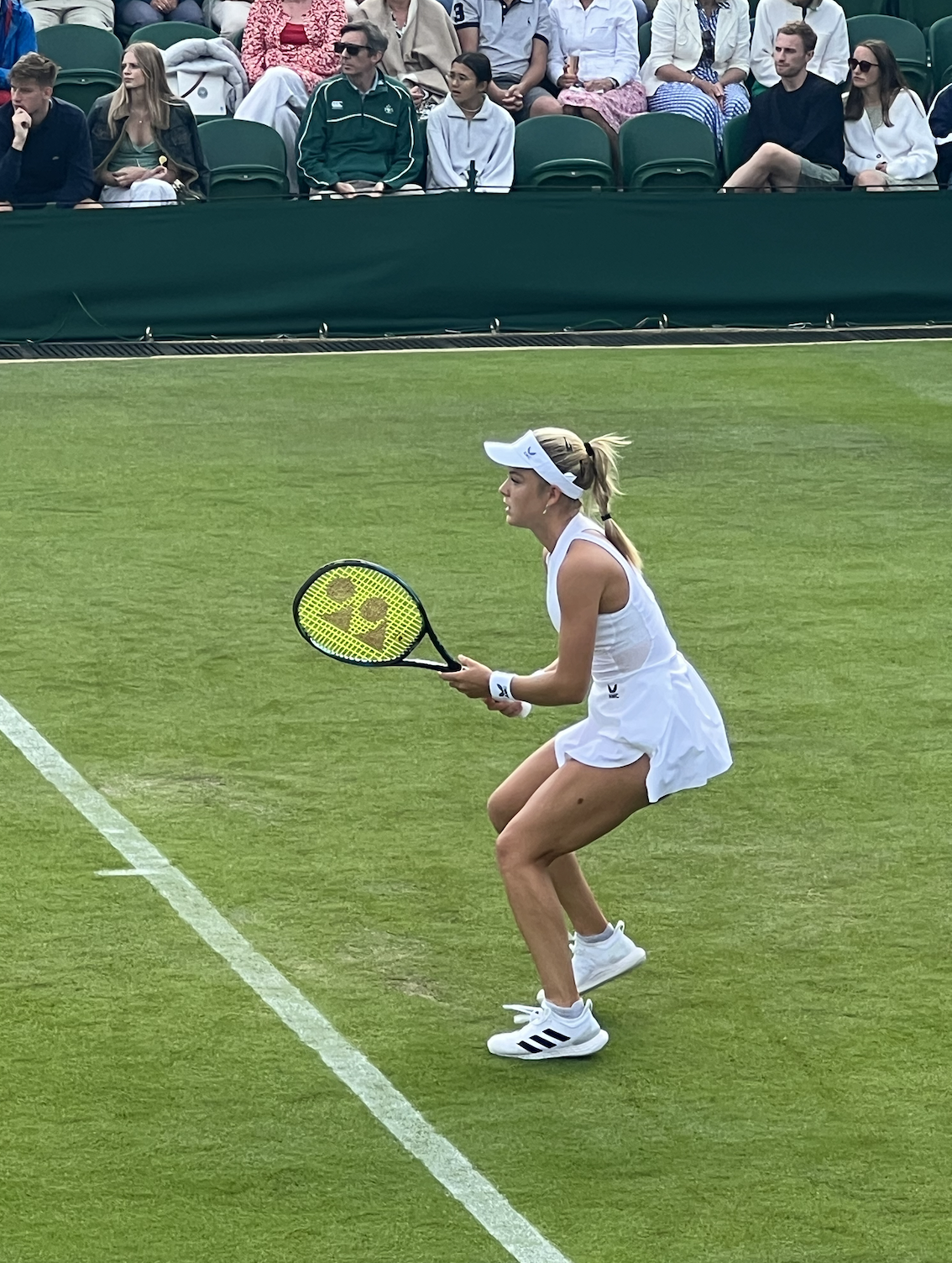
Swan at Wimbledon, 2023

==== 2024–2025: Injury lay-off and climbing back to the top 300 ====
A back injury limited Swan's tennis activity throughout 2024 with her taking part in only a handful of low-level tournaments and withdrawing from several matches, before sitting out the entire second half of the year and contemplating retirement.

In June 2025, she won her first title in more than two and a half years at the W15 San Diego, defeating Dejana Radanović in the final. Later that month, Swan was given a wildcard entry into qualifying at Wimbledon, but lost in the first round to Leyre Romero Gormaz.

Returning to the ITF World Tour, Swan won a W35 event in Don Benito in July 2025, overcoming Viktória Hrunčáková in the final. Swan found further success in Australia, winning the W35 tournament in Wagga Wagga in September 2025 overcoming Taylah Preston in the final, before triumphing at the Brisbane W50 in November by defeating Wei Sijia in the final for her biggest tournament win since 2022. After this event, a back injury prevented her from being able to properly compete in Sydney and Playford to round out the year, with Swan having to withdraw from the opening rounds. Overall she won four ITF titles in 2025, her most in a single year, and ended the year as the world No. 275.

==== 2026: Wimbledon second round, back to top 150 ====
Swan started her 2026 season as a member of the British team at the United Cup. She lost to Naomi Osaka in their opening tie against Japan, after being drafted in as a replacement for Emma Raducanu who withdrew shortly before the match was due to take place.

In April, Swan was drafted into the Great Britain squad for their BJK Cup qualifier against Australia in Melbourne after Sonay Kartal withdrew due to a back injury. She lost to Emerson Jones in a dead rubber match played after Britain had already won the overall tie. The following month, Swan won back-to-back titles in Japan at the W35 Fukuoka International and the W75 Kurume International.

Three years after her last main-draw appearance at the tournament, Swan was given a wildcard entry into the singles draw at Wimbledon. She defeated Irina-Camelia Begu to reach the second round for the second time in her career having previously done so in 2018 when she also overcame the same opponent in her opening match. Swan lost to 26th seed Madison Keys in the second round in a match played on Court No. 1.

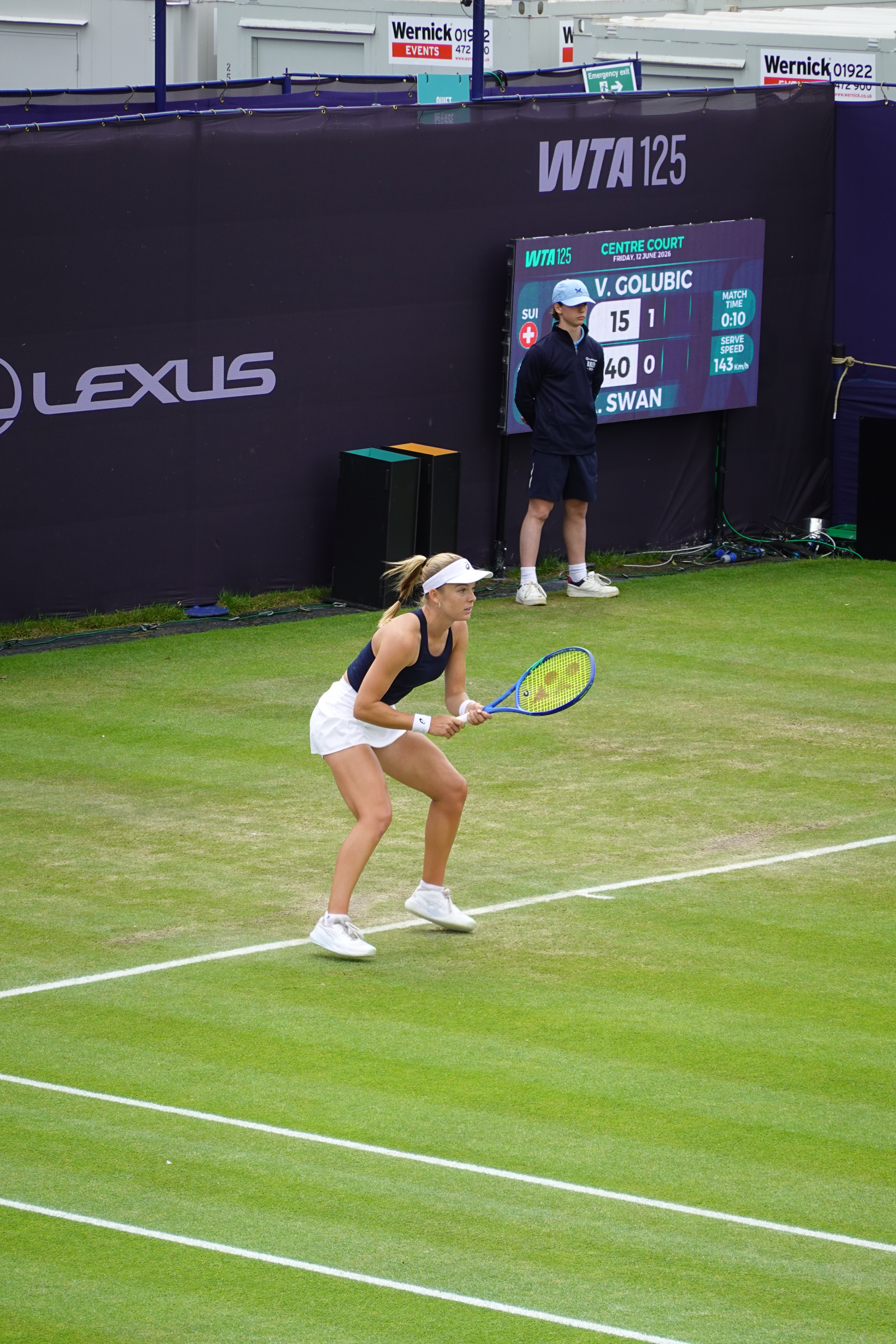
Swan at the 2026 Ilkley Open

At the US Open qualifying tournament, she defeated wildcard entrant Katrina Scott to make it into the second round, where she lost to Mary Stoiana in three sets. In November at the W35 Sydney, Swan defeated Hikaru Sato in the final to claim her third singles title of the year. The following week, she made it back-to-back titles by winning her first W100 event at the Incheon Open in Korea, defeating Ku Yeon-woo in the final. As a result she climbed 57 places in the WTA singles rankings to world No. 148 on 9 November 2026.

== Performance timelines ==
Key
W	F	SF	QF	#R	RR	Q#	DNQ	A	NH

(W) winner; (F) finalist; (SF) semifinalist; (QF) quarterfinalist; (#R) rounds 4, 3, 2, 1; (RR) round-robin stage; (Q#) qualification round; (DNQ) did not qualify; (A) absent; (NH) not held; (SR) strike rate (events won / competed); (W–L) win–loss record.
To avoid confusion and double counting, these charts are updated at the conclusion of a tournament or when the player's participation has ended.

Only main-draw results in WTA Tour, Grand Slam tournaments, Fed Cup/Billie Jean King Cup and Olympic Games are included in win–loss records.

=== Singles ===
Current through the 2026 US Open.

Tournament	2015	2016	2017	2018	2019	2020	2021	2022	2023	2026	W–L
Grand Slam tournaments
Australian Open	A	A	A	A	Q1	A	A	Q2	Q1	A	0–0
French Open	A	A	A	A	Q3	A	A	Q1	Q1	A	0–0
Wimbledon	Q2	1R	Q1	2R	1R	NH	1R	1R	1R	2R	2–7
US Open	A	A	A	Q3	Q1	A	A	A	A	Q2	0–0
Win–Loss	0–0	0–1	0–0	1–1	0–1	0–0	0–1	0–1	0–1	1–1	2–7
WTA 1000
Qatar / Dubai Open (Note: The first Premier 5 event of the year has switched back and forth between the Dubai Tennis Championships and the Qatar Ladies Open since 2009. Dubai was classified as a Premier 5 event from 2009 to 2011 before being succeeded by Doha for the 2012–2014 period. In 2015, Dubai regained its Premier 5 status while Doha was demoted to Premier status. The Premier 5 tournaments were reclassified as WTA 1000 tournaments in 2021.)	A	A	A	A	A	A	A	A	A	A	0–0
Indian Wells Open	A	A	A	A	A	NH	A	A	1R	A	0–1
Miami Open	A	Q2	Q1	A	A	NH	A	A	Q1	A	0–0
Madrid Open	A	A	A	A	A	NH	A	A	A	A	0–0
Italian Open	A	A	A	A	A	A	A	A	A	A	0–0
Canadian Open	A	A	A	A	A	NH	A	A	A	A	0–0
Cincinnati Open	A	A	A	A	A	A	A	A	A	A	0–0
Pan Pacific / Wuhan Open (Note: In 2014, the Pan Pacific Open was downgraded to a Premier event and replaced by the Wuhan Open. The Premier 5 tournaments were reclassified as WTA 1000 tournaments in 2021.)	A	A	A	A	A	NH				A	0–0
China Open	A	A	A	A	A	NH			A	A	0–0
Career statistics
Tournaments	1	1	0	4	3	0	1	3	1		Career total: 14
Overall win–loss	0–1	0–1	0–0	1–4	0–3	0–0	0–1	4–3	2–2		7–15
Year-end ranking	514	435	299	176	240	267	236	121	284		$1,222,764

== ITF Circuit finals ==
=== Singles: 23 (20 titles, 3 runner-ups) ===
Legend W100 tournaments W60/75 tournaments W50 tournaments W25/35 tournaments W10/15 tournaments	Finals by surface Hard (16–2) Grass (0–1) Carpet (4–0)

Result	W–L	Date	Tournament	Tier	Surface	Opponent	Score
Win	1–0	Mar 2015	ITF Sharm El Sheikh, Egypt	W10	Hard	(Bulgaria) Julia Terziyska	6–2, 6–2
Win	2–0	Sep 2015	ITF Madrid, Spain	W10	Hard	(Spain) Cristina Sánchez Quintanar	6–7^{(5)}, 6–2, 6–3
Win	3–0	Feb 2017	ITF Sharm El Sheikh, Egypt	W15	Hard	(Turkey) Pemra Özgen	6–3, 6–1
Win	4–0	Mar 2017	ITF Sharm El Sheikh, Egypt	W15	Hard	(Germany) Julia Wachaczyk	6–4, 7–5
Win	5–0	Oct 2017	ITF Óbidos, Portugal	W25	Carpet	(United Kingdom) Katie Boulter	5–0 ret.
Win	6–0	May 2018	Torneo Conchita Martínez, Spain	W25	Hard	(Spain) Aliona Bolsova	6–2, 6–3
Win	7–0	Oct 2019	ITF Claremont, United States	W25	Hard	(Brazil) Thaisa Grana Pedretti	6–1, 6–3
Win	8–0	Feb 2021	ITF Orlando, United States	W25	Hard	(United States) Robin Anderson	6–1, 6–3
Win	9–0	Nov 2021	ITF Haabneeme, Estonia	W25	Hard (i)	(Russia) Ekaterina Shalimova	7–6^{(3)}, 6–3
Win	10–0	Feb 2022	ITF Santo Domingo, Dominican Republic	W25	Hard	(United States) Sachia Vickery	6–4, 6–3
Win	11–0	Aug 2022	Lexington Challenger, US	W60	Hard	(United Kingdom) Jodie Burrage	6–0, 3–6, 6–3
Win	12–0	Oct 2022	Trnava Indoor, Slovakia	W60	Hard (i)	(China) Wang Xinyu	6–1, 3–6, 6–4
Loss	12–1	Jun 2023	Surbiton Trophy, United Kingdom	W100	Grass	(Belgium) Yanina Wickmayer	6–2, 4–6, 6–7^{(1)}
Win	13–1	May 2025	ITF San Diego, United States	W15	Hard	(Serbia) Dejana Radanović	6–4, 6–0
Win	14–1	Jul 2025	ITF Don Benito, Spain	W35	Carpet	(Slovakia) Viktória Hrunčáková	7–6^{(5)}, 6–1
Win	15–1	Sep 2025	ITF Wagga Wagga, Australia	W35	Hard	(Australia) Taylah Preston	6–1, 6–2
Loss	15–2	Sep 2025	ITF Wagga Wagga 2, Australia	W35	Hard	(Australia) Taylah Preston	4–6, 6–7^{(5)}
Loss	15–3	Oct 2025	Brisbane QTC International, Australia	W35	Hard	(China) Tian Fangran	6–2, 6–7^{(5)}, 1–6
Win	16–3	Nov 2025	Queensland International, Australia	W50	Hard	(China) Wei Sijia	3–6, 6–3, 6–3
Win	17–3	May 2026	Fukuoka International, Japan	W35	Carpet	(Japan) Rina Saigo	6–1, 6–3
Win	18–3	May 2026	Kurume Cup, Japan	W75	Carpet	(Japan) Kyoka Okamura	7–5, 6–1
Win	19–3	Nov 2026	ITF Sydney, Australia	W35	Hard	(Japan) Hikaru Sato	6–1, 6–2
Win	20–3	Nov 2026	Incheon Open, South Korea	W100	Hard	(South Korea) Ku Yeon-woo	6–1, 0–6, 6–3

=== Doubles: 7 (1 title, 6 runner-ups) ===
Legend W50/60 tournaments W40/50 tournaments W25 tournaments W10 tournaments	Finals by surface Hard (1–6)

Result	W–L	Date	Tournament	Tier	Surface	Partner	Opponents	Score
Loss	0–1	Mar 2015	ITF Sharm El Sheikh, Egypt	W10	Hard	(United Kingdom) Aimee Gibson	(Egypt) Ola Abou Zekry (Ukraine) Kateryna Sliusar	2–6, 4–6
Loss	0–2	Oct 2016	Abierto Tampico, Mexico	W50	Hard	(United States) Usue Arconada	(Belgium) Elise Mertens (Romania) Mihaela Buzărnescu	0–6, 2–6
Loss	0–3	Oct 2017	ITF Óbidos, Portugal	W25	Hard	(Turkey) Berfu Cengiz	(Russia) Olga Doroshina (Russia) Yana Sizikova	2–6, 2–6
Loss	0–4	Nov 2017	GB Pro-Series Shrewsbury, UK	W25	Hard (i)	(United Kingdom) Maia Lumsden	(United Kingdom) Freya Christie (United Kingdom) Harriet Dart	6–3, 4–6, [6–10]
Loss	0–5	Jul 2019	Berkeley Club Challenge, US	W60	Hard	(United States) Francesca Di Lorenzo	(United States) Madison Brengle (United States) Sachia Vickery	3–6, 5–7
Win	1–5	Oct 2021	ITF Redding, US	W25	Hard	(Sweden) Mirjam Björklund	(Slovenia) Dalila Jakupović (China) Lu Jiajing	6–3, 1–6, [10–3]
Loss	1–6	Jul 2024	ITF Nottingham, UK	W50	Hard	(United Kingdom) Mimi Xu	(United Kingdom) Naiktha Bains (United Kingdom) Amelia Rajecki	6–1, 4–6, [8–10]

== Junior Grand Slam tournament final ==
=== Singles: 1 (runner-up) ===
Result	Year	Tournament	Surface	Opponent	Score
Loss	2015	Australian Open	Hard	(Slovakia) Tereza Mihalíková	1–6, 4–6

== Fed Cup/Billie Jean King Cup participation ==
=== Singles (2–2) ===
Edition	Round	Date	Location	Against	Surface	Opponent	W/L	Result
2016	Z1 RR	Feb 2016	Eilat (ISR)	(Georgia (country)) Georgia	Hard (i)	Ekaterine Gorgodze	W	6–3, 6–3
2016	Z1 RR	Feb 2016	Eilat (ISR)	South Africa	Hard (i)	Ilze Hattingh	W	6–3, 6–0
2016	Z1 PO	Feb 2016	Eilat (ISR)	Belgium	Hard (i)	Ysaline Bonaventure	L	3–6, 6–3, 3–6
2026	QR	Apr 2026	Melbourne (AUS)	Australia	Hard	Emerson Jones	L	5–7, 3–6

=== Doubles (2–1) ===
Edition	Round	Date	Location	Against	Surface	Partner	Opponents	W/L	Result
2019	Z1 RR	Feb 2019	Bath (GBR)	Slovenia	Hard (i)	Harriet Dart	Dalila Jakupović; Kaja Juvan	W	6–2, 6–2
2019	Z1 RR	Feb 2019	Bath (GBR)	Greece	Hard (i)	Harriet Dart	Anna Arkadianou; Despina Papamichail	W	6–1, 6–4
2022	QR	Apr 2022	Prague (CZE)	Czech Republic	Clay	Harriet Dart	Karolína Muchová; Markéta Vondroušová	L	1–6, 5–7

== See also ==
- Junior tennis
