= Aidan McHugh =

British tennis player

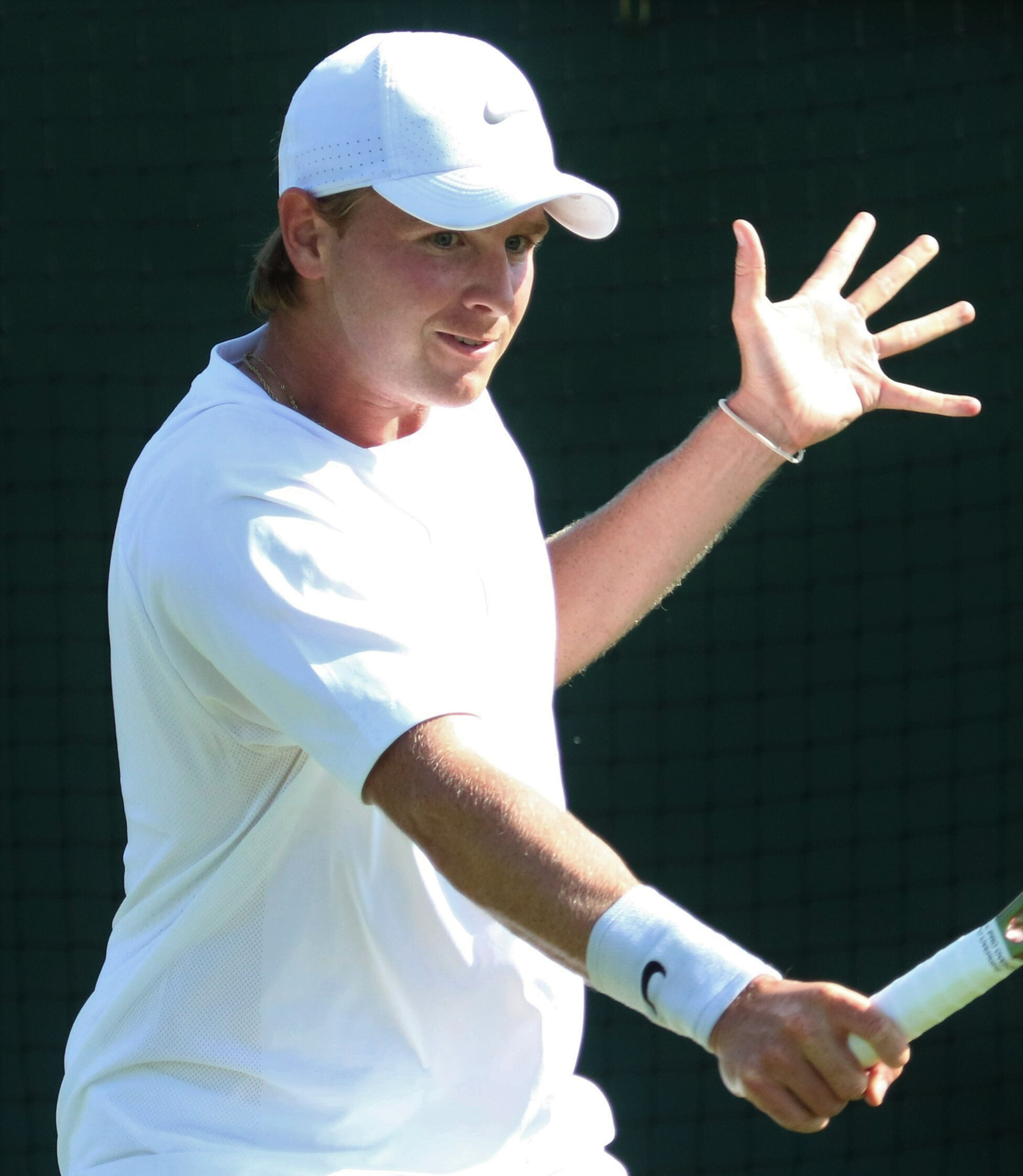
- McHugh at the 2022 Wimbledon Championships
- Full name: Aidan McHugh
- Country (sports): Great Britain
- Born: 9 July 2000 (age 26) Glasgow, United Kingdom
- Height: 1.80 m (5 ft 11 in)
- Plays: Right-handed (one-handed backhand)
- Coach: Toby Smith
- Prize money: US $250,129

Singles
- Career record: 0–0 (at ATP Tour level, Grand Slam level, and in Davis Cup)
- Career titles: 0
- Highest ranking: No. 298 (28 February 2022)
- Current ranking: No. 489 (19 October 2026)

Grand Slam singles results
- Wimbledon: Q2 (2022)

Doubles
- Career record: 1–1 (at ATP Tour level, Grand Slam level, and in Davis Cup)
- Career titles: 0
- Highest ranking: No. 270 (17 June 2024)
- Current ranking: No. 1,202 (19 October 2026)

Grand Slam doubles results
- Wimbledon: 2R (2021)

Grand Slam mixed doubles results
- Wimbledon: 2R (2021)
- Last updated on: 19 October 2026.

Aidan McHugh (born 9 July 2000) is a British professional tennis player. He has a career high ATP singles ranking of world No. 298 achieved on 28 February 2022 and a career high ATP doubles ranking of world No. 285 achieved on 3 October 2022.

== Career ==
From Bearsden, he attended St Aloysius' College, Glasgow. He became a client of Andy Murray’s 77 Sports Management firm, where he is joined by fellow tennis players Paul Jubb, Harriet Dart, Katie Swan and Jack Pinnington Jones. His usual training facility is the Scotstoun Sports Campus in Glasgow and he is on the Lawn Tennis Association’s Pro Scholarship Programme. McHugh has been described as Murray’s protégé.

He reached the semifinals of the 2018 Australian Open – Boys' singles where he defeated Ondrej Styler, Filip Jianu, Jaimee Floyd Angele and Rinky Hijikata before he lost to Tseng Chun-hsin in three sets.

During the COVID-19 pandemic, he took part in the Battle Of The Brits Team Tennis at the National Tennis Centre in London, England. He helped Judy Murray to produce online exercise modules for players of all ages that also involved Andy Murray, Jamie Murray, and Colin Fleming amongst others.

He received a wildcard on to the main draw of 2021 Nottingham Trophy – Men's singles where he defeated world number 105 Mikhail Kukushkin in straight sets for his first win on the ATP Challenger Tour.

He received a wildcard for the main draw of the 2021 Wimbledon Championships men’s doubles alongside Alastair Gray, where he recorded his first Major win against Jiří Veselý and Roman Jebavý and a wildcard into the qualifying for the men’s singles.

== Personal life ==
He is a fan of Celtic F.C.

== Career finals ==
=== Singles: 19 (8–11) ===
Legend (singles) ITF Futures Tour (8–11)	Titles by surface Hard (8–11) Clay (0–0) Grass (0–0) Carpet (0–0)

Result	W–L	Date	Tournament	Tier	Surface	Opponent	Score
Loss	0–1	Sep 2018	Great Britain F6, Barnstaple	Futures	Hard	(United Kingdom) Mark Whitehouse	4–6, 6–3, 6–7^{(2–7)}
Win	1–1	Oct 2018	Kuwait F1, Mishref	Futures	Hard	(United States) Alec Adamson	6–2, 6–7^{(3–7)}, 6–2
Win	2–1	Nov 2018	Kuwait F3, Mishref	Futures	Hard	(France) Constantin Bittoun Kouzmine	6–1, 6–3
Loss	2–2	Jun 2019	M15 Heraklion	Futures	Hard	(Greece) Michail Pervolarakis	1–6, 4–6
Loss	2–3	Jun 2019	M15 Singapore	Futures	Hard	(Australia) Dayne Kelly	3–6, 0–6
Win	3–3	Jun 2019	M15 Singapore	Futures	Hard	(United Kingdom) Jonathan Gray	6–2, 6–2
Loss	3–4	Mar 2021	M15 Indore	Futures	Hard	(United States) Zane Khan	7–6^{(10–8)}, 6–7^{(6–8)}, 6–7^{(4–7)}
Win	4–4	Jun 2021	M25 Santo Domingo	Futures	Hard	(Argentina) Nicolás Kicker	7–5, 3–6, 6–3
Loss	4–5	Aug 2021	M25 Decatur	Futures	Hard	(United States) Eliot Spizzirri	2–6, 5–7
Loss	4–6	Oct 2021	M25 Rodez	Futures	Hard	(France) Antoine Escoffier	7–5, 5–7, 4–6
Win	5–6	Oct 2022	M25 Glasgow	Futures	Hard (i)	(Poland) Filip Peliwo	7–6^{(7–4)}, 6–4
Win	6–6	Jul 2023	M25 Champaign	Futures	Hard	(United States) Cannon Kingsley	6–4, 6–3
Loss	6–7	Jul 2023	M25 Edwardsville	Futures	Hard	(United States) Quinn Vandecasteele	3–6, 6–7^{(5–7)}
Win	7–7	Sep 2023	M25 Madrid	Futures	Hard	(Germany) Peter Heller	6–4, 7–5
Loss	7–8	Jul 2024	M25 East Lansing	WTT	Hard	(United Kingdom) Johannus Monday	2–6, 2–6
Loss	7–9	Feb 2025	M15 Huamantla	WTT	Hard	(Canada) Alvin Nicholas Tudorica	2–6, 6–1, 1–6
Loss	7–10	Jul 2025	M25 Edwardsville	WTT	Hard	(United States) Kyle Kang	6–3, 1–6, 1–6
Loss	7–11	Oct 2025	M25 Harlingen	WTT	Hard	(Spain) Alex Martinez	3–6, 6–2, 4–6
Win	8–11	Oct 2025	M25 East Lansing	WTT	Hard	Erik Arutiunian	7–5, 6–3

=== Doubles: 10 (3–7) ===
Legend (doubles) ATP Challenger Tour (0–1) ITF Futures Tour (3–6)	Titles by surface Hard (3–7) Clay (0–0) Grass (0–0) Carpet (0–0)

Result	W–L	Date	Tournament	Tier	Surface	Partner	Opponents	Score
Win	1–0	Sep 2018	Great Britain F6, Barnstaple	Futures	Hard	(United Kingdom) James Story	(United Kingdom) Elliott Farmer (Australia) Cameron Green	6–4, 6–1
Loss	1–1	Oct 2018	Israel F13, Ashkelon	Futures	Hard	(Switzerland) Jakub Paul	(Netherlands) Guy Den Heijer (Netherlands) Sidane Pontjodikromo	5–7, 4–6
Win	2–1	May 2019	M15 Heraklion	Futures	Hard	(United Kingdom) Lloyd Glasspool	(Greece) Michail Pervolarakis (Greece) Petros Tsitsipas	7–6^{(7–5)}, 7–6^{(7–2)}
Loss	2–2	Sep 2019	M15 Kiryat Shmona	Futures	Hard	(United Kingdom) Jack Draper	(United States) Samuel Beren (Canada) Raheel Manji	4–6, 6–2, [6–10]
Loss	2–3	Nov 2020	M15 Sharm El Sheikh	Futures	Hard	(India) Siddhant Banthia	(Bosnia and Herzegovina) Aldin Šetkić (Belarus) Yaraslav Shyla	6–7^{(2–7)}, 3–6
Loss	2–4	Feb 2021	M15 Sharm El Sheikh	Futures	Hard	(Belgium) Arnaud Bovy	(Dominican Republic) Nick Hardt (United States) Nicolas Moreno de Alboran	3–6, 4–6
Win	3–4	Feb 2022	M25 Glasgow	World Tennis Tour	Hard	(Netherlands) Gijs Brouwer	(United Kingdom) Charles Broom (Germany) Constantin Frantzen	4–6, 7–6^{(7–1)}, [10–4]
Loss	3–5	Aug 2022	Lexington, USA	Challenger	Hard	(Netherlands) Gijs Brouwer	(India) Yuki Bhambri (India) Saketh Myneni	6-3, 4–6, [8-10]
Loss	3–6	Mar 2023	M25 Loulé	World Tennis Tour	Hard	(Netherlands) Jesper de Jong	(Netherlands) Sidane Pontjodikromo (Netherlands) Niels Visker	6–4, 2–6, [8–10]
Loss	3–7	Jun 2023	M15 Rancho Santa Fe	World Tennis Tour	Hard	(United States) Keegan Smith	(United States) Jack Anthrop (United States) Bryce Nakashima	1–6, 4–6
