= 2025 Erste Bank Open – Singles =

2025 tennis tournament in Austria

Singles
- 2025 Erste Bank Open

Final
- Champion: (Italy) Jannik Sinner
- Runner-up: (Germany) Alexander Zverev
- Score: 3–6, 6–3, 7–5

Details
- Draw: 32 (4 Q / 3 WC )
- Seeds: 8

Events
Singles	Doubles
← 2024 ·	Erste Bank Open	· 2026 →

Jannik Sinner defeated Alexander Zverev in the final, 3–6, 6–3, 7–5 to win the singles tennis title at the 2025 Vienna Open. It was his second title at the tournament (after 2023), and 22nd career ATP Tour title.

Jack Draper was the reigning champion, but did not participate this year due to an arm injury.

== Seeds ==
1. (Italy) Jannik Sinner (champion)
2. (Germany) Alexander Zverev (final)
3. (Australia) Alex de Minaur (semifinals)
4. (Italy) Lorenzo Musetti (semifinals)
5. Karen Khachanov (first round)
6. Daniil Medvedev (second round)
7. Andrey Rublev (first round)
8. (Kazakhstan) Alexander Bublik (quarterfinals)

== Draw ==
=== Key ===
- Q = Qualifier
- WC = Wild card
- LL = Lucky loser
- Alt = Alternate
- ITF = ITF entry
- PR = Protected ranking
- SR = Special ranking
- SE = Special exempt
- JE = Junior exempt
- JR = Junior Accelerator Programme entrant
- CO = College Accelerator Programme entrant
- NG = Next Gen Accelerator Program entrant
- w/o = Walkover
- r = Retired
- d = Defaulted

=== Finals ===
Semifinals
1	(Italy) Jannik Sinner	6	6
3	(Australia) Alex de Minaur	3	4
4	(Italy) Lorenzo Musetti	4	5
2	(Germany) Alexander Zverev	6	7

Final
1	(Italy) Jannik Sinner	3	6	7
2	(Germany) Alexander Zverev	6	3	5

=== Top half ===
First round
1	(Italy) J Sinner	6	6
(Germany) D Altmaier	0	2
(Czech Republic) T Macháč	6^{6}	2
(Italy) F Cobolli	7^{8}	6
(Argentina) F Cerúndolo	6	6
(United States) A Michelsen	3	1
(Chile) A Tabilo	4	4
8	(Kazakhstan) A Bublik	6	6
3	(Australia) A de Minaur	6	6
WC	(Austria) J Rodionov	4	1
(Argentina) C Ugo Carabelli	5	6^{6}
WC	(Austria) F Misolic	7	7^{8}
(Australia) A Popyrin	6^{5}	3
(Italy) M Berrettini	7^{7}	6
(United Kingdom) C Norrie	6	6^{5}	6
7	A Rublev	2	7^{7}	2

Second round
1	(Italy) J Sinner	6	7^{7}
(Italy) F Cobolli	2	6^{4}
(Argentina) F Cerúndolo	4	2
8	(Kazakhstan) A Bublik	6	6
3	(Australia) A de Minaur	6	6
WC	(Austria) F Misolic	4	4
(Italy) M Berrettini	7^{8}	6^{9}	6
(United Kingdom) C Norrie	6^{6}	7^{11}	4

Quarterfinals
1	(Italy) J Sinner	6	6
8	(Kazakhstan) A Bublik	4	4
3	(Australia) A de Minaur	6	7^{7}
(Italy) M Berrettini	1	6^{4}

Semifinals
1	(Italy) J Sinner	6	6
3	(Australia) A de Minaur	3	4

=== Bottom half ===
First round
6	D Medvedev	6	6^{7}	6
(Portugal) N Borges	4	7^{9}	2
Q	(Bosnia and Herzegovina) D Džumhur	3	0
(France) C Moutet	6	6
(Argentina) TM Etcheverry	6	6
WC	(Norway) N Budkov Kjær	3	3
LL	(Serbia) H Medjedovic	4	3
4	(Italy) L Musetti	6	6
5	K Khachanov	3	7	4
(Netherlands) T Griekspoor	6	5	6
(Italy) L Darderi	2	5
(United States) B Nakashima	6	7
Q	(United States) A Kovacevic	5	4
Q	(Italy) M Arnaldi	7	6
Q	(United Kingdom) J Fearnley	4	6	6^{5}
2	(Germany) A Zverev	6	1	7^{7}

Second round
6	D Medvedev	6^{3}	4
(France) C Moutet	7^{7}	6
(Argentina) TM Etcheverry	3	4
4	(Italy) L Musetti	6	6
(Netherlands) T Griekspoor	7^{7}	7^{7}
(United States) B Nakashima	6^{4}	6^{2}
Q	(Italy) M Arnaldi	4	4
2	(Germany) A Zverev	6	6

Quarterfinals
(France) C Moutet	3	4
4	(Italy) L Musetti	6	6
(Netherlands) T Griekspoor
2	(Germany) A Zverev	w/o

Semifinals
4	(Italy) L Musetti	4	5
2	(Germany) A Zverev	6	7

== Qualifying ==
=== Seeds ===
1. (Hungary) Márton Fucsovics (withdrew)
2. (Serbia) Hamad Medjedovic (qualifying competition, lucky loser)
3. (France) Térence Atmane (first round)
4. (Bosnia and Herzegovina) Damir Džumhur (qualified)
5. (United States) Aleksandar Kovacevic (qualified)
6. (United States) Ethan Quinn (qualifying competition)
7. (Italy) Matteo Arnaldi (qualified)
8. (United Kingdom) Jacob Fearnley (qualified)

=== Qualifiers ===
1. (Italy) Matteo Arnaldi
2. (United Kingdom) Jacob Fearnley
3. (United States) Aleksandar Kovacevic
4. (Bosnia and Herzegovina) Damir Džumhur

=== Lucky loser ===
1. (Serbia) Hamad Medjedovic

=== Qualifying draw ===
==== First qualifier ====
First round
Alt	(Slovakia) Lukáš Klein	6^{5}	6^{5}
(Australia) Tristan Schoolkate	7^{7}	7^{7}
(Netherlands) Jesper de Jong	4	6^{5}
7	(Italy) Matteo Arnaldi	6	7^{7}

Qualifying competition
(Australia) Tristan Schoolkate	6^{5}	3
7	(Italy) Matteo Arnaldi	7^{7}	6

==== Second qualifier ====
First round
2	(Serbia) Hamad Medjedovic	6	6
WC	(Austria) Joel Schwärzler	2	4
(Czech Republic) Dalibor Svrčina	4	5
8	(United Kingdom) Jacob Fearnley	6	7

Qualifying competition
2	(Serbia) Hamad Medjedovic	6^{11}	3
8	(United Kingdom) Jacob Fearnley	7^{13}	6

==== Third qualifier ====
First round
3	(France) Térence Atmane	3	1
Alt	(United States) Mackenzie McDonald	6	6
WC	(Austria) Lukas Neumayer	6^{6}	6	6^{2}
5	(United States) Aleksandar Kovacevic	7^{8}	3	7^{7}

Qualifying competition
Alt	(United States) Mackenzie McDonald	6	1	2
5	(United States) Aleksandar Kovacevic	2	6	6

==== Fourth qualifier ====
First round
4	(Bosnia and Herzegovina) Damir Džumhur	6	4	7^{7}
(Australia) Aleksandar Vukic	1	6	6^{3}
(Czech Republic) Vít Kopřiva	6	1	1
6	(United States) Ethan Quinn	4	6	6

Qualifying competition
4	(Bosnia and Herzegovina) Damir Džumhur	6	6
6	(United States) Ethan Quinn	3	3
