= 2024 Erste Bank Open =

Men's tennis tournament in Austria

- Date: 21–27 October
- Edition: 50th
- Category: ATP Tour 500
- Draw: 32S / 16D
- Prize money: €2,470,310
- Surface: Hard (indoor)
- Location: Vienna, Austria
- Venue: Wiener Stadthalle

Champions

Singles
- (United Kingdom) Jack Draper

Doubles
- (Austria) Alexander Erler / (Austria) Lucas Miedler
← 2023 ·	Vienna Open	· 2025 →

The 2024 Erste Bank Open was a men's tennis tournament played on indoor hard courts. It was the 50th edition of the event, and part of the ATP Tour 500 series of the 2024 ATP Tour. It was held at the Wiener Stadthalle in Vienna, Austria, from 21 until 27 October 2024.

== Champions ==
=== Singles ===
- (United Kingdom) Jack Draper def. Karen Khachanov, 6–4, 7–5

=== Doubles ===
- (Austria) Alexander Erler / (Austria) Lucas Miedler def. (United Kingdom) Neal Skupski / (New Zealand) Michael Venus, 4–6, 6–3, [10–1]

== Points and prize money ==
=== Point distribution ===
Event	W	F	SF	QF	Round of 16	Round of 32	Q	Q2	Q1
Singles	500	330	200	100	50	0	20	10	0
Doubles	500	300	180	90	0	—			

=== Prize money ===
Event	W	F	SF	QF	Round of 16	Round of 32	Q2	Q1
Singles	€461,920	€248,540	€132,470	€67,680	€36,130	€19,270	—	—
Doubles*	€151,740	€80,930	€40,950	€20,470	€10,600	—	—	—

_{*per team}

== Singles main-draw entrants ==
=== Seeds ===
Country	Player	Rank^{1}	Seed
GER	Alexander Zverev	3	1
AUS	Alex de Minaur	9	2
BUL	Grigor Dimitrov	10	3
USA	Tommy Paul	13	4
USA	Frances Tiafoe	15	5
ITA	Lorenzo Musetti	18	6
GBR	Jack Draper	19	7
AUS	Alexei Popyrin	24	8

- ^{1} Rankings as of 14 October 2024

=== Other entrants ===
The following players received wildcards into the singles main draw:

- (Japan) Kei Nishikori
- (Austria) Joel Schwärzler
- (Austria) Dominic Thiem

The following players received entry from the qualifying draw:

- (France) Quentin Halys
- (Hungary) Márton Fucsovics
- (Czech Republic) Jakub Menšík
- (Brazil) Thiago Seyboth Wild

=== Withdrawals ===
- (United States) Taylor Fritz → replaced by (United States) Marcos Giron
- (United States) Sebastian Korda → replaced by (France) Gaël Monfils
- Daniil Medvedev → replaced by (United States) Alex Michelsen
- (Australia) Jordan Thompson → replaced by (Hungary) Fábián Marozsán

== Doubles main draw entrants ==
=== Seeds ===
Country	Player	Country	Player	Rank^{1}	Seed
ESA	Marcelo Arévalo	CRO	Mate Pavić	7	1
IND	Rohan Bopanna	AUS	Matthew Ebden	15	2
FIN	Harri Heliövaara	GBR	Henry Patten	35	3
USA	Nathaniel Lammons	USA	Jackson Withrow	40	4

- ^{1} Rankings as of 14 October 2024

=== Other entrants ===
The following pairs received wildcards into the doubles main draw:

- (Austria) Alexander Erler / (Austria) Lucas Miedler
- (Netherlands) Robin Haase / (Germany) Alexander Zverev

The following pair received entry from the qualifying draw:

- (Slovakia) Lukáš Klein / (Slovakia) Jozef Kovalík
