= 2025 Erste Bank Open – Doubles =

2025 tennis tournament in Austria

Doubles
- 2025 Erste Bank Open

Final
- Champions: (United Kingdom) Julian Cash (United Kingdom) Lloyd Glasspool
- Runners-up: (Portugal) Francisco Cabral (Austria) Lucas Miedler
- Score: 6–1, 7–6^{(8–6)}

Details
- Draw: 16
- Seeds: 4

Events
Singles	Doubles
← 2024 ·	Erste Bank Open	· 2026 →

Julian Cash and Lloyd Glasspool defeated defending champion Lucas Miedler and his partner Francisco Cabral in the final, 6–1, 7–6^{(8–6)} to win the doubles tennis title at the 2025 Vienna Open.

Alexander Erler and Miedler were the reigning champions, but chose not to compete together this year. Erler partnered Robert Galloway, but lost in the quarterfinals to Harri Heliövaara and Henry Patten.

== Seeds ==
1. (El Salvador) Marcelo Arévalo / (Croatia) Mate Pavić (quarterfinals, retired)
2. (United Kingdom) Julian Cash / (United Kingdom) Lloyd Glasspool (champions)
3. (Finland) Harri Heliövaara / (United Kingdom) Henry Patten (semifinals)
4. (United Kingdom) Joe Salisbury / (United Kingdom) Neal Skupski (quarterfinals)

== Draw ==
Key

- Q = Qualifier
- WC = Wild card
- LL = Lucky loser
- Alt = Alternate
- ITF = ITF entry
- PR = Protected ranking
- SR = Special ranking
- SE = Special exempt
- JE = Junior exempt
- JR = Junior Accelerator Programme entrant
- CO = College Accelerator Programme entrant
- NG = Next Gen Accelerator Program entrant
- w/o = Walkover
- r = Retired
- d = Defaulted

=== Draw ===
First round
1	(El Salvador) M Arévalo (Croatia) M Pavić	2	6	[10]
LL	(Uruguay) A Behar (Belgium) J Vliegen	6	3	[5]
(India) Y Bhambri (Sweden) A Göransson	3	6	[10]
WC	(Austria) N Oberleitner (Austria) J Schwärzler	6	1	[8]
4	(United Kingdom) J Salisbury (United Kingdom) N Skupski	4	7^{7}	[10]
(Argentina) F Cerúndolo (Argentina) C Ugo Carabelli	6	6^{5}	[4]
(Portugal) F Cabral (Austria) L Miedler	7	3	[10]
Q	(Germany) C Frantzen (Netherlands) R Haase	5	6	[8]
WC	(Austria) A Erler (United States) R Galloway	5	6	[10]
(Argentina) M González (Argentina) A Molteni	7	4	[3]
(Brazil) M Melo (Germany) A Zverev	3	1
3	(Finland) H Heliövaara (United Kingdom) H Patten	6	6
(Argentina) G Andreozzi (Italy) L Darderi	4	6	[6]
LL	(Brazil) F Romboli (Australia) J-P Smith	6	4	[10]
(France) S Doumbia (France) F Reboul	6	3	[5]
2	(United Kingdom) J Cash (United Kingdom) L Glasspool	4	6	[10]

Quarterfinals
1	(El Salvador) M Arévalo (Croatia) M Pavić	7^{8}	4	0^{r}
(India) Y Bhambri (Sweden) A Göransson	6^{6}	6	0
4	(United Kingdom) J Salisbury (United Kingdom) N Skupski	3	4
(Portugal) F Cabral (Austria) L Miedler	6	6
WC	(Austria) A Erler (United States) R Galloway	2	1
3	(Finland) H Heliövaara (United Kingdom) H Patten	6	6
LL	(Brazil) F Romboli (Australia) J-P Smith	6^{2}	4
2	(United Kingdom) J Cash (United Kingdom) L Glasspool	7^{7}	6

Semifinals
(India) Y Bhambri (Sweden) A Göransson	4	6^{5}
(Portugal) F Cabral (Austria) L Miedler	6	7^{7}
3	(Finland) H Heliövaara (United Kingdom) H Patten	6	3	[5]
2	(United Kingdom) J Cash (United Kingdom) L Glasspool	4	6	[10]

Final
(Portugal) F Cabral (Austria) L Miedler	1	6^{6}
2	(United Kingdom) J Cash (United Kingdom) L Glasspool	6	7^{8}

== Qualifying ==
=== Seeds ===
1. (Brazil) Fernando Romboli / (Australia) John-Patrick Smith (qualifying competition, lucky losers)
2. (Germany) Constantin Frantzen / (Netherlands) Robin Haase (qualified)

=== Qualifiers ===
1. (Germany) Constantin Frantzen / (Netherlands) Robin Haase

=== Lucky losers ===
1. (Brazil) Fernando Romboli / (Australia) John-Patrick Smith
2. (Uruguay) Ariel Behar / (Belgium) Joran Vliegen

=== Qualifying draw ===
First round
1	(Brazil) Fernando Romboli (Australia) John-Patrick Smith	6	6^{5}	[10]
(Uruguay) Ariel Behar (Belgium) Joran Vliegen	3	7^{7}	[5]
WC	(Austria) David Pichler (Austria) Jurij Rodionov	3	6	[3]
2	(Germany) Constantin Frantzen (Netherlands) Robin Haase	6	1	[10]

Qualifying competition
1	(Brazil) Fernando Romboli (Australia) John-Patrick Smith	7^{8}	4	[4]
2	(Germany) Constantin Frantzen (Netherlands) Robin Haase	6^{6}	6	[10]
