= 2024 Erste Bank Open – Singles =

2024 tennis tournament in Austria

Singles
- 2024 Erste Bank Open

Final
- Champion: (United Kingdom) Jack Draper
- Runner-up: Karen Khachanov
- Score: 6–4, 7–5

Details
- Draw: 32 (4 Q / 3 WC )
- Seeds: 8

Events
Singles	Doubles
← 2023 ·	Erste Bank Open	· 2025 →

Jack Draper defeated Karen Khachanov in the final, 6–4, 7–5 to win the singles tennis title at the 2024 Vienna Open. It was his second ATP Tour title and first at the ATP 500 level.

Jannik Sinner was the reigning champion, but did not participate this year.

This tournament marked the final professional appearance of former world No. 3 and 2020 US Open champion Dominic Thiem. He lost to Luciano Darderi in the first round.

== Seeds ==
1. (Germany) Alexander Zverev (quarterfinals)
2. (Australia) Alex de Minaur (semifinals)
3. (Bulgaria) Grigor Dimitrov (second round)
4. (United States) Tommy Paul (first round)
5. (United States) Frances Tiafoe (second round)
6. (Italy) Lorenzo Musetti (semifinals)
7. (United Kingdom) Jack Draper (champion)
8. (Australia) Alexei Popyrin (first round)

== Draw ==
=== Key ===
- Q = Qualifier
- WC = Wild card
- LL = Lucky loser
- Alt = Alternate
- ITF = ITF entry
- PR = Protected ranking
- SR = Special ranking
- SE = Special exempt
- JE = Junior exempt
- JR = Junior Accelerator Programme entrant
- CO = College Accelerator Programme entrant
- NG = Next Gen Accelerator Program entrant
- w/o = Walkover
- r = Retired
- d = Defaulted

=== Finals ===
Semifinals
6	(Italy) Lorenzo Musetti	2	4
7	(United Kingdom) Jack Draper	6	6
Karen Khachanov	6	6
2	(Australia) Alex de Minaur	2	4

Final
7	(United Kingdom) Jack Draper	6	7
Karen Khachanov	4	5

=== Top half ===
First round
1	(Germany) A Zverev	6	6
WC	(Austria) J Schwärzler	2	2
(United States) A Michelsen	6^{4}	3
(United States) M Giron	7^{7}	6
Q	(France) Q Halys	6^{5}	3
(France) G Monfils	7^{7}	6
(Italy) L Sonego	3	2
6	(Italy) L Musetti	6	6
3	(Bulgaria) G Dimitrov	6	7
(China) Z Zhang	4	5
(Czech Republic) T Macháč	7^{7}	6
(Hungary) F Marozsán	6^{5}	1
WC	(Austria) D Thiem	6^{6}	2
(Italy) L Darderi	7^{8}	6
WC	(Japan) K Nishikori	6^{5}	5
7	(United Kingdom) J Draper	7^{7}	7

Second round
1	(Germany) A Zverev	6	7
(United States) M Giron	2	5
(France) G Monfils
6	(Italy) L Musetti	w/o
3	(Bulgaria) G Dimitrov	7^{7}	4	3
(Czech Republic) T Macháč	6^{5}	6	6
(Italy) L Darderi	5	1
7	(United Kingdom) J Draper	7	6

Quarterfinals
1	(Germany) A Zverev	6	6^{5}	4
6	(Italy) L Musetti	2	7^{7}	6
(Czech Republic) T Macháč	3	6	1
7	(United Kingdom) J Draper	6	3	6

Semifinals
6	(Italy) L Musetti	2	4
7	(United Kingdom) J Draper	6	6

=== Bottom half ===
First round
5	(United States) F Tiafoe	6	7^{7}
(United Kingdom) C Norrie	4	6^{4}
Q	(Hungary) M Fucsovics	5	4
(Italy) M Berrettini	7	6
K Khachanov	6	6
Q	(Brazil) T Seyboth Wild	2	4
(United States) B Nakashima	6	6
4	(United States) T Paul	4	4
8	(Australia) A Popyrin	6^{3}	2
Q	(Czech Republic) J Menšík	7^{7}	6
(Serbia) M Kecmanović	6	6
(Argentina) M Navone	2	4
(Italy) F Cobolli	7^{7}	6
(Spain) A Davidovich Fokina	6^{1}	3
(Germany) J-L Struff	6	2	2
2	(Australia) A de Minaur	2	6	6

Second round
5	(United States) F Tiafoe	3	7^{8}	3
(Italy) M Berrettini	6	6^{6}	6
K Khachanov	1	6	6
(United States) B Nakashima	6	3	4
Q	(Czech Republic) J Menšík	6	7^{9}
(Serbia) M Kecmanović	3	6^{7}
(Italy) F Cobolli	6^{2}	1^{r}
2	(Australia) A de Minaur	7^{7}	3

Quarterfinals
(Italy) M Berrettini	1	4
K Khachanov	6	6
Q	(Czech Republic) J Menšík	7^{7}	3	4
2	(Australia) A de Minaur	6^{2}	6	6

Semifinals
K Khachanov	6	6
2	(Australia) A de Minaur	2	4

== Qualifying ==
=== Seeds ===
1. (Czech Republic) Jakub Menšík (qualified)
2. Pavel Kotov (first round)
3. (Spain) Jaume Munar (qualifying competition)
4. (Belgium) Zizou Bergs (withdrew)
5. (France) Alexandre Müller (qualifying competition)
6. (France) Corentin Moutet (first round)
7. (Serbia) Dušan Lajović (first round)
8. (Brazil) Thiago Seyboth Wild (qualified)

=== Qualifiers ===
1. (Czech Republic) Jakub Menšík
2. (Hungary) Márton Fucsovics
3. (France) Quentin Halys
4. (Brazil) Thiago Seyboth Wild

=== Qualifying draw ===
==== First qualifier ====
First round
1	(Czech Republic) Jakub Menšík	6	6
(Switzerland) Alexander Ritschard	3	4
(Germany) Maximilian Marterer	4	6	2
5	(France) Alexandre Müller	6	3	6

Qualifying competition
1	(Czech Republic) Jakub Menšík	6	6
5	(France) Alexandre Müller	3	2

==== Second qualifier ====
First round
2	Pavel Kotov	3	4
(Hungary) Márton Fucsovics	6	6
WC	(France) Richard Gasquet	7	7^{7}
7	(Serbia) Dušan Lajović	5	6^{2}

Qualifying competition
(Hungary) Márton Fucsovics	6	6^{6}	6
WC	(France) Richard Gasquet	3	7^{8}	3

==== Third qualifier ====
First round
3	(Spain) Jaume Munar	7	6
WC	(Austria) Jurij Rodionov	5	3
(France) Quentin Halys	0	7^{7}	6
6	(France) Corentin Moutet	6	6^{5}	4

Qualifying competition
3	(Spain) Jaume Munar	1	6^{3}
(France) Quentin Halys	6	7^{7}

==== Fourth qualifier ====
First round
Alt	(China) Bu Yunchaokete	5	7^{7}	6^{3}
(United States) Aleksandar Kovacevic	7	6^{3}	7^{7}
WC	(Spain) Pablo Carreño Busta	3	2
8	(Brazil) Thiago Seyboth Wild	6	6

Qualifying competition
(United States) Aleksandar Kovacevic	4	4
8	(Brazil) Thiago Seyboth Wild	6	6
