= 2020 US Open (tennis) =

Tennis competition

- Date: August 31 – September 13
- Edition: 140th
- Category: Grand Slam (ITF)
- Draw: 128 singles players, 32 doubles pairs
- Prize money: US$53,402,000
- Surface: Hard
- Location: New York City, United States
- Venue: USTA Billie Jean King National Tennis Center

Champions

Men's singles
- (Austria) Dominic Thiem

Women's singles
- (Japan) Naomi Osaka

Men's doubles
- (Croatia) Mate Pavić / (Brazil) Bruno Soares

Women's doubles
- (Germany) Laura Siegemund / (Russia) Vera Zvonareva

Wheelchair men's singles
- (Japan) Shingo Kunieda

Wheelchair women's singles
- (Netherlands) Diede de Groot

Wheelchair quad singles
- (Netherlands) Sam Schröder

Wheelchair men's doubles
- (United Kingdom) Alfie Hewett / (United Kingdom) Gordon Reid

Wheelchair women's doubles
- (Japan) Yui Kamiji / (United Kingdom) Jordanne Whiley

Wheelchair quad doubles
- (Australia) Dylan Alcott / (United Kingdom) Andy Lapthorne
- US Open

The 2020 US Open was the 140th edition of tennis's US Open and the second Grand Slam event of the year. It was held on outdoor hard courts at the USTA Billie Jean King National Tennis Center in Queens, New York. The tournament was an event run by the International Tennis Federation (ITF) and was part of the calendars for the 2020 ATP Tour and the 2020 WTA Tour, the top professional men's and women's tennis circuits, respectively.

Held during the COVID-19 pandemic, the tournament saw changes in format and personnel compared to previous editions. As a result, withdrawals and opt-outs became a theme of the competition. Defending men's singles champion and world No. 2 Rafael Nadal and No. 9 Gaël Monfils withdrew due to COVID-19 safety concerns, while No. 4 Roger Federer, No. 12 Fabio Fognini, and No. 15 Stan Wawrinka opted out for other reasons. On the women's side, defending singles champion and world No. 6 Bianca Andreescu did not return due to safety concerns, nor did No. 1 Ashleigh Barty, No. 2 Simona Halep, or No. 5 Elina Svitolina, among others. Further, the qualifying rounds of the tournament, in addition to the mixed doubles and juniors draws, were not held due to the pandemic.

Men's singles world No. 1 Novak Djokovic made headlines by becoming the first top-seeded player to be disqualified from a Grand Slam singles tournament when he was defaulted from his fourth-round match for hitting a ball out of frustration that inadvertently hit a line judge in the throat. Although accidental, Djokovic's actions were deemed to be in violation of a Grand Slam rule regarding ball abuse, and he was disqualified from the tournament.

Dominic Thiem won the men's singles title for his first Grand Slam title. He became the first new Grand Slam men's singles champion since 2014 with his five-set defeat of first-time Grand Slam finalist Alexander Zverev. The women's singles competition was won by Naomi Osaka, who defeated Victoria Azarenka in three sets to capture her second US Open title and third Grand Slam title overall. Osaka arrived to the final wearing a black face mask bearing the name of Tamir Rice, a 12-year-old African-American boy shot to death in Cleveland in November 2014. The tournament took place during the George Floyd protests, and Osaka wore similar masks for each of her other six matches, each with a different name of a Black American who died as a result of unjust violence from police or other citizens in the United States.

== Tournament ==
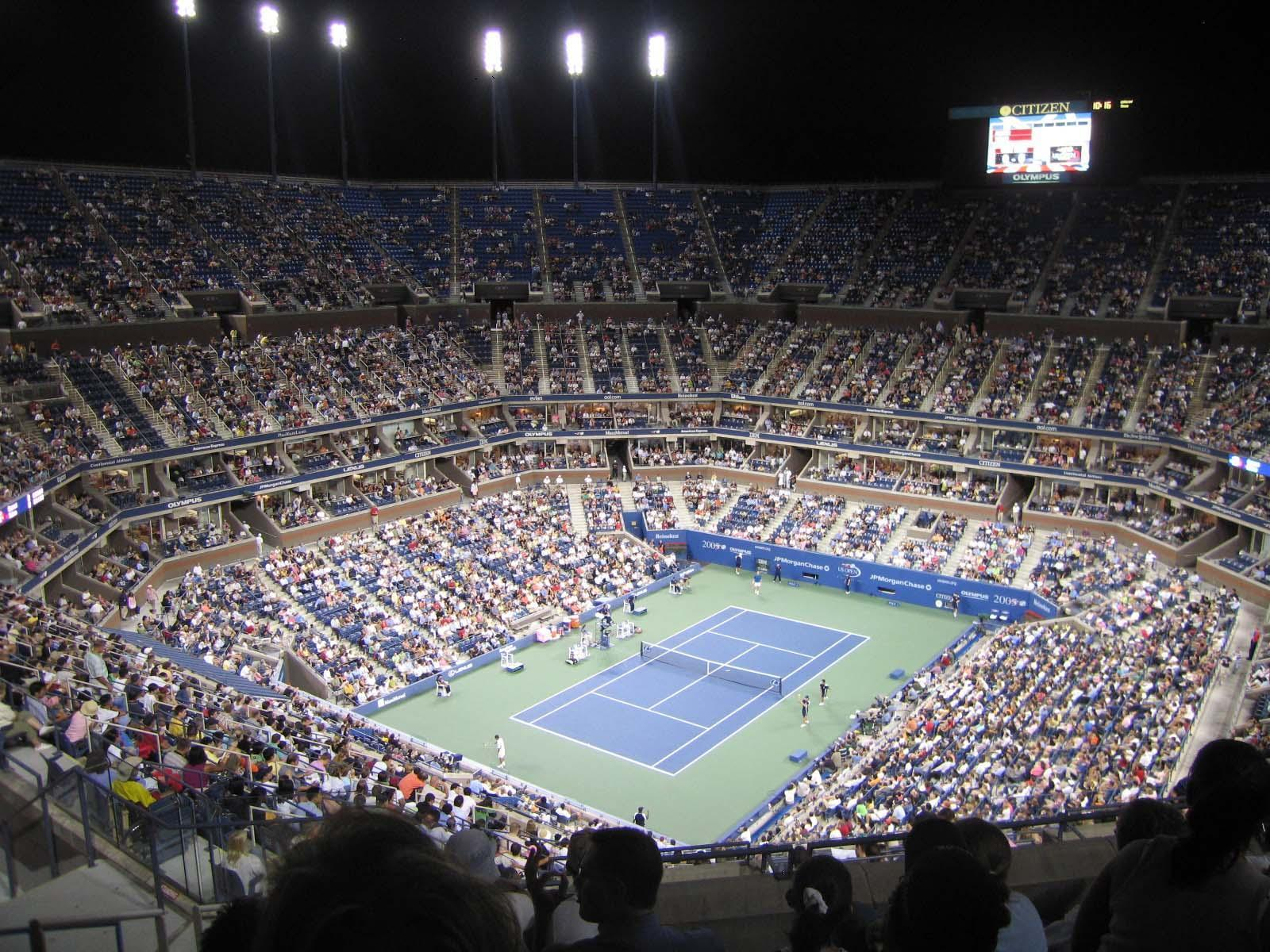
The Arthur Ashe Stadium (pictured here in 2006) was the venue for the 2020 US Open finals.

The 2020 US Open was the 140th edition of the tournament and took place at the USTA Billie Jean King National Tennis Center in Flushing Meadows–Corona Park of Queens in New York City, United States, where it has been held since 1978. The tournament was held on 17 Laykold hard courts for the first time.

The tournament consisted of the men's and women's singles and doubles draws, men's and women's wheelchair singles and doubles draws and a wheelchair quad singles and doubles draw. Both doubles draws were cut to 32 pairs instead of the standard 64. Due to COVID protocol decisions made by the New York state government, the USTA and US Open cancelled the draws for qualifying matches, mixed doubles, and junior matches, a decision that was sharply criticized by lower-ranked players, bringing accusations of the tournament "catering to the top". The wheelchair events were initially not scheduled to be held, due to a change that would have removed them from the event every four years due to a conflict with the Summer Paralympic Games, but the events were reinstated following the postponement of the 2020 Summer Paralympics to 2021 and criticism from several wheelchair players, notably Dylan Alcott.

The tournament used two of the three main show courts at the National Tennis Center – Arthur Ashe Stadium and Louis Armstrong Stadium. Five of the complex's 18 total courts, including Grandstand, the main stadium of the 2020 Western & Southern Open, which was held in New York City instead of its usual Cincinnati venue, were not used for the tournament due to the lack of players.

=== Impact of the COVID-19 pandemic ===
The US Open is normally the final major tournament of the year, scheduled during August and September. It was instead the second major of the year due to the cancellation of Wimbledon to June 2021 and the rescheduling of the French Open to late September. In June 2020, it was announced that the event would take place without spectators for the first time in the tournament's history, and the first time in all the Grand Slam tournaments' 143-year history, due to concerns relating to the ongoing COVID-19 pandemic. Players would not be required to quarantine upon arrival, but were subject to regular COVID-19 testing, both prior to arrival and throughout the tournament, and all players and personnel were required to wear a face mask upon entering the grounds except while practicing, training, and working out. To reduce staff, electronic line judges were used on most matches, excluding those held on the two main show courts.

In the event a player was deemed a close contact of someone who had tested positive, the United States Tennis Association (USTA) and New York City health officials initially stated that the player could continue play, but would be subject to "enhanced" health protocol, including daily testing and restricted access to facilities. On September 5, the USTA announced that health officials in Nassau County, where most players were residing in hotels, had issued 14-day quarantine orders "for all individuals who had prolonged close contact to a person who previously tested positive", thus impacting their ability to continue competing in the tournament.

The effects of the virus were seen both before and during the tournament. COVID-19 precautions necessitated the cancellation of the qualification matches and the ATP and WTA rankings were the sole metric used to determine entry into the tournament aside from wild cards. Each singles field contained 120 players who gained entry via their ranking and eight wild card entries. This differed from previous years where 16 players in both men's and women's singles entered their draws through qualifying.

Many players cited safety concerns due to the pandemic as reason to withdraw from the tournament prior to its start, including men's players Rafael Nadal, Gaël Monfils, Stan Wawrinka, Alexei Popyrin, Nick Kyrgios, and Kei Nishikori, and women's players Bianca Andreescu, Simona Halep, Ashleigh Barty, Elina Svitolina, Kiki Bertens, Belinda Bencic, Wang Qiang, and Barbora Strýcová, among others. All in all, the women's singles competition was hit the hardest, as 24 of the top 100 ranked players were absent from the competition. In addition, Benoît Paire was forced to drop out of the tournament due to a positive COVID-19 test. This test also led to the forced withdrawal of the top-seeded women's doubles duo of Tímea Babos and Kristina Mladenovic prior to their second round match due to potential exposure to Paire. Additionally, the men's singles third round match between Alexander Zverev and Adrian Mannarino was delayed for three hours due to a "collaborative dialogue with health officials", as a tournament statement phrased it, to determine whether Mannarino could play in the match after his exposure to Paire.

=== Players ===
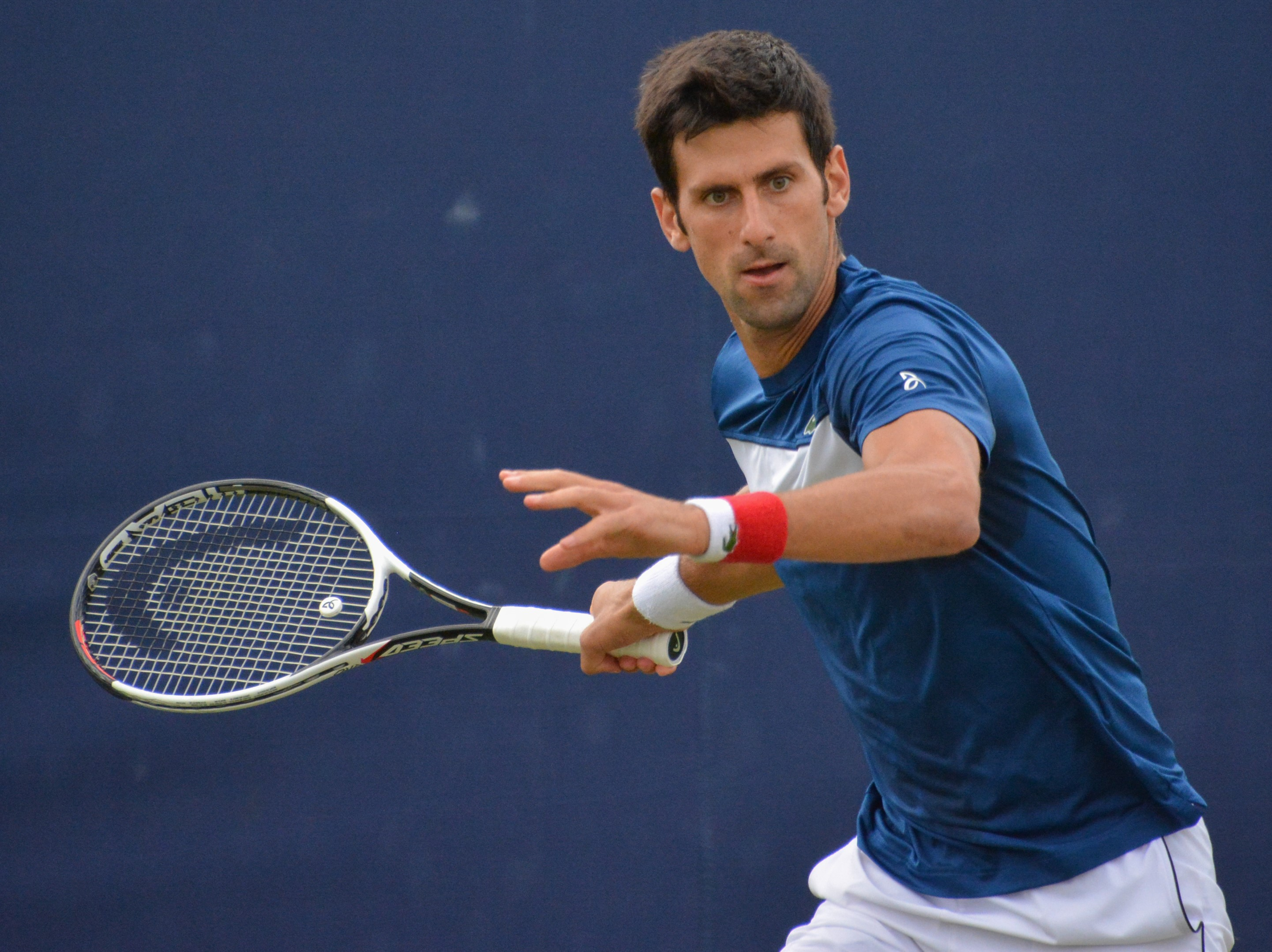
Novak Djokovic (pictured) received the top seed in the men's singles event and was the favorite to win the title.

The men's singles competition featured seven players ranked in the top 10 in the ATP rankings at the time of the tournament. World No. 1 Novak Djokovic received the top seed, followed by Dominic Thiem, Daniil Medvedev, and Stefanos Tsitsipas. Djokovic was the clear odds-on betting favorite entering the competition, followed by the other top four seeds. Three previous US Open champions, as well as two previous finalists, were included in the field: Djokovic, a three-time champion; one-time champions Andy Murray and Marin Čilić; and one-time finalists Kevin Anderson, entering as a replacement for Nick Kyrgios, and Daniil Medvedev. Several notable players were missing for non-COVID-19 issues. No. 4 ranked and five-time champion Roger Federer was injured, while No. 12 Fabio Fognini and No. 15 Stan Wawrinka opted out to prepare for the upcoming clay court season. Eight players, all from the United States, entered the draw as wild cards, and three players with a protected ranking, including American player Jack Sock, who replaced Federer.

The women's singles tournament was far more affected by withdrawals than the men's singles; of the players ranked in the top ten, only four competed. The top seed in the draw went to world No. 3 Karolína Plíšková, followed by Sofia Kenin, Serena Williams, and Naomi Osaka. Despite being seeded third and fourth, Williams and Osaka entered the tournament as odds-on favorites, having been given equal betting odds to win the title, followed by Plíšková and Kenin. Included in the draw were five previous US Open champions: six-time champion Serena Williams, two-time champion Venus Williams, three-time champion Kim Clijsters, who entered as a wild card, and one-time champions Angelique Kerber and Sloane Stephens. Three previous finalists also competed: Victoria Azarenka, Karolína Plíšková, and Madison Keys. Previous champions Svetlana Kuznetsova and Samantha Stosur were scheduled to compete in the event, but withdrew prior to the competition. Eight players, consisting of Clijsters and seven American players, gained entry to the tournament as wild cards, while five were entered with a protected ranking and an additional two competed as alternates.

Doubles draws were topped by Juan Sebastián Cabal and Robert Farah on the men's side, and Tímea Babos and Kristina Mladenovic on the women's side. Each draw contained 32 pairs, with four wild card entries.

== Singles players ==
Men's singles

Men's singles players
Champion		Runner-up	
(Austria) Dominic Thiem [2]		(Germany) Alexander Zverev [5]	
Semifinals out
(Spain) Pablo Carreño Busta [20]		(Russia) Daniil Medvedev [3]	
Quarterfinals out
(Canada) Denis Shapovalov [12]	(Croatia) Borna Ćorić [27]	(Russia) Andrey Rublev [10]	(Australia) Alex de Minaur [21]
4th round out
(Serbia) Novak Djokovic [1]	(Belgium) David Goffin [7]	(Australia) Jordan Thompson	(Spain) Alejandro Davidovich Fokina
(Italy) Matteo Berrettini [6]	(United States) Frances Tiafoe	(Canada) Vasek Pospisil	(Canada) Félix Auger-Aliassime [15]
3rd round out
(Germany) Jan-Lennard Struff [28]	(Lithuania) Ričardas Berankis	(United States) Taylor Fritz [19]	(Serbia) Filip Krajinović [26]
(Greece) Stefanos Tsitsipas [4]	(Kazakhstan) Mikhail Kukushkin	(United Kingdom) Cameron Norrie	(France) Adrian Mannarino [32]
(Norway) Casper Ruud [30]	(Italy) Salvatore Caruso	(Hungary) Márton Fucsovics	(United States) J. J. Wolf (WC)
(Spain) Roberto Bautista Agut [8]	(Russia) Karen Khachanov [11]	(France) Corentin Moutet	(Croatia) Marin Čilić [31]
2nd round out
(United Kingdom) Kyle Edmund	(United States) Michael Mmoh (WC)	(United States) Mitchell Krueger (WC)	(United States) Steve Johnson
(South Korea) Kwon Soon-woo	(France) Gilles Simon	(United States) Marcos Giron	(South Africa) Lloyd Harris
(United States) Maxime Cressy (WC)	(Argentina) Juan Ignacio Londero	(Belarus) Egor Gerasimov	(Chile) Cristian Garín [13]
(Argentina) Federico Coria	(Poland) Hubert Hurkacz [24]	(United States) Jack Sock (PR)	(United States) Brandon Nakashima (WC)
(France) Ugo Humbert	(Finland) Emil Ruusuvuori	(United States) Ernesto Escobedo (Alt)	(France) Grégoire Barrère
(Bulgaria) Grigor Dimitrov [14]	(Australia) John Millman	(Spain) Roberto Carballés Baena	(Australia) Christopher O'Connell
(Serbia) Miomir Kecmanović	(Canada) Milos Raonic [25]	(France) Richard Gasquet	(Russia) Andrey Kuznetsov (PR)
(United Kingdom) Andy Murray	(United Kingdom) Dan Evans [23]	(Slovakia) Norbert Gombos	(India) Sumit Nagal
1st round out
(Bosnia and Herzegovina) Damir Džumhur	(Kazakhstan) Alexander Bublik	(Portugal) João Sousa	(Spain) Pedro Martínez
(Japan) Yasutaka Uchiyama	(Portugal) Pedro Sousa	(Italy) Federico Gaio	(United States) John Isner [16]
(United States) Sebastian Korda (WC)	(United States) Thai-Son Kwiatkowski (WC)	(Egypt) Mohamed Safwat	(Germany) Dominik Koepfer
(Sweden) Mikael Ymer	(Australia) Marc Polmans	(Italy) Marco Cecchinato	(United States) Reilly Opelka
(Spain) Albert Ramos Viñolas	(Slovakia) Jozef Kovalík	(Russia) Evgeny Donskoy	(Spain) Pablo Andújar
(Serbia) Dušan Lajović [18]	(Italy) Stefano Travaglia	(Hungary) Attila Balázs	(United States) Ulises Blanch (WC)
(Argentina) Diego Schwartzman [9]	(Chinese Taipei) Jason Jung	(Austria) Dennis Novak	(Germany) Peter Gojowczyk
(Italy) Lorenzo Sonego	(Uruguay) Pablo Cuevas	(Italy) Paolo Lorenzi	(South Africa) Kevin Anderson
(Japan) Go Soeda	(Japan) Yūichi Sugita	(Slovenia) Aljaž Bedene	(United States) Mackenzie McDonald (PR)
(Poland) Kamil Majchrzak	(Australia) James Duckworth	(Japan) Taro Daniel	(France) Jérémy Chardy
(United States) Tommy Paul	(Bolivia) Hugo Dellien	(Italy) Andreas Seppi	(Georgia (country)) Nikoloz Basilashvili [22]
(Argentina) Guido Pella [29]	(Spain) Feliciano López	(Serbia) Laslo Đere	(Argentina) Federico Delbonis
(United States) Tennys Sandgren	(Italy) Gianluca Mager	(Germany) Philipp Kohlschreiber	(Argentina) Leonardo Mayer
(Slovakia) Andrej Martin	(Croatia) Ivo Karlović	(United States) Sam Querrey	(Italy) Jannik Sinner
(Brazil) Thiago Monteiro	(Japan) Yoshihito Nishioka	(Czech Republic) Jiří Veselý	(Brazil) Thiago Seyboth Wild
(United States) Denis Kudla	(Moldova) Radu Albot	(United States) Bradley Klahn	(Spain) Jaume Munar

Women's singles

Women's singles players
Champion		Runner-up	
(Japan) Naomi Osaka [4]		(Belarus) Victoria Azarenka	
Semifinals out
(United States) Jennifer Brady [28]		(United States) Serena Williams [3]	
Quarterfinals out
(Kazakhstan) Yulia Putintseva [23]	(United States) Shelby Rogers	(Bulgaria) Tsvetana Pironkova (PR)	(Belgium) Elise Mertens [16]
4th round out
(Germany) Angelique Kerber [17]	(Croatia) Petra Martić [8]	(Estonia) Anett Kontaveit [14]	(Czech Republic) Petra Kvitová [6]
(France) Alizé Cornet	(Greece) Maria Sakkari [15]	(Czech Republic) Karolína Muchová [20]	(United States) Sofia Kenin [2]
3rd round out
(France) Caroline Garcia	(United States) Ann Li	(Belarus) Aliaksandra Sasnovich	(Russia) Varvara Gracheva
(Ukraine) Marta Kostyuk	(Poland) Magda Linette [24]	(United States) Madison Brengle	(United States) Jessica Pegula
(United States) Madison Keys [7]	(Croatia) Donna Vekić [18]	(United States) Amanda Anisimova [22]	(United States) Sloane Stephens [26]
(Poland) Iga Świątek	(Romania) Sorana Cîrstea	(United States) Caty McNally	(Tunisia) Ons Jabeur [27]
2nd round out
(Czech Republic) Karolína Plíšková [1]	(United States) CiCi Bellis (WC)	(Germany) Anna-Lena Friedsam	(United States) Alison Riske [13]
(Czech Republic) Markéta Vondroušová [12]	(Belarus) Vera Lapko (PR)	(France) Kristina Mladenovic [30]	(Ukraine) Kateryna Bondarenko (PR)
(Italy) Camila Giorgi	(Latvia) Anastasija Sevastova [31]	(Montenegro) Danka Kovinić	(Slovenia) Kaja Juvan
(Kazakhstan) Elena Rybakina [11]	(Ukraine) Dayana Yastremska [19]	(Belgium) Kirsten Flipkens	(Ukraine) Kateryna Kozlova
(Spain) Aliona Bolsova	(Belgium) Ysaline Bonaventure	(Romania) Patricia Maria Țig	(Spain) Garbiñe Muguruza [10]
(United States) Bernarda Pera	(United States) Katrina Scott (WC)	(Belarus) Olga Govortsova	(Russia) Margarita Gasparyan
(Belarus) Aryna Sabalenka [5]	(United States) Sachia Vickery (WC)	(Russia) Anna Kalinskaya	(United Kingdom) Johanna Konta [9]
(Spain) Sara Sorribes Tormo	(Russia) Ekaterina Alexandrova [21]	(Estonia) Kaia Kanepi	(Canada) Leylah Annie Fernandez
1st round out
(Ukraine) Anhelina Kalinina	(Italy) Jasmine Paolini	(Germany) Tamara Korpatsch	(Russia) Anna Blinkova
(Australia) Ajla Tomljanović	(United States) Caroline Dolehide	(Netherlands) Arantxa Rus	(Germany) Tatjana Maria
(Belgium) Greet Minnen	(United States) Francesca Di Lorenzo	(Switzerland) Viktorija Golubic	(United States) Robin Montgomery (WC)
(United States) Hailey Baptiste (WC)	(Spain) Paula Badosa	(United States) Allie Kiick (WC)	(Czech Republic) Tereza Martincová
(Japan) Misaki Doi	(Belgium) Alison Van Uytvanck	(Russia) Daria Kasatkina	(United States) Coco Gauff
(Australia) Maddison Inglis	(Australia) Lizette Cabrera	(United States) Usue Maitane Arconada	(United States) Danielle Collins
(Ukraine) Katarina Zavatska	(Russia) Irina Khromacheva (PR)	(Australia) Arina Rodionova (Alt)	(Australia) Astra Sharma
(Sweden) Rebecca Peterson [32]	(Czech Republic) Marie Bouzková	(United States) Whitney Osuigwe	(Romania) Irina-Camelia Begu
(Hungary) Tímea Babos	(Switzerland) Jil Teichmann	(United States) Lauren Davis	(China) Zhang Shuai [25]
(Czech Republic) Kristýna Plíšková	(Japan) Kurumi Nara	(Russia) Liudmila Samsonova	(Japan) Nao Hibino
(Switzerland) Stefanie Vögele	(Kazakhstan) Zarina Diyas	(Russia) Natalia Vikhlyantseva	(Bulgaria) Viktoriya Tomova
(Romania) Mihaela Buzărnescu	(United States) Asia Muhammad (Alt)	(Puerto Rico) Monica Puig	(United States) Kristie Ahn
(France) Océane Dodin	(Austria) Barbara Haas	(United States) Taylor Townsend	(Russia) Veronika Kudermetova [29]
(United States) Venus Williams	(Serbia) Nina Stojanović	(United States) Christina McHale	(United Kingdom) Heather Watson
(Germany) Laura Siegemund	(United States) Claire Liu (WC)	(Slovakia) Viktória Kužmová	(Belgium) Kim Clijsters (WC)
(Poland) Katarzyna Kawa	(Czech Republic) Kateřina Siniaková	(Russia) Vera Zvonareva (PR)	(Belgium) Yanina Wickmayer

== Events ==
=== Men's singles ===
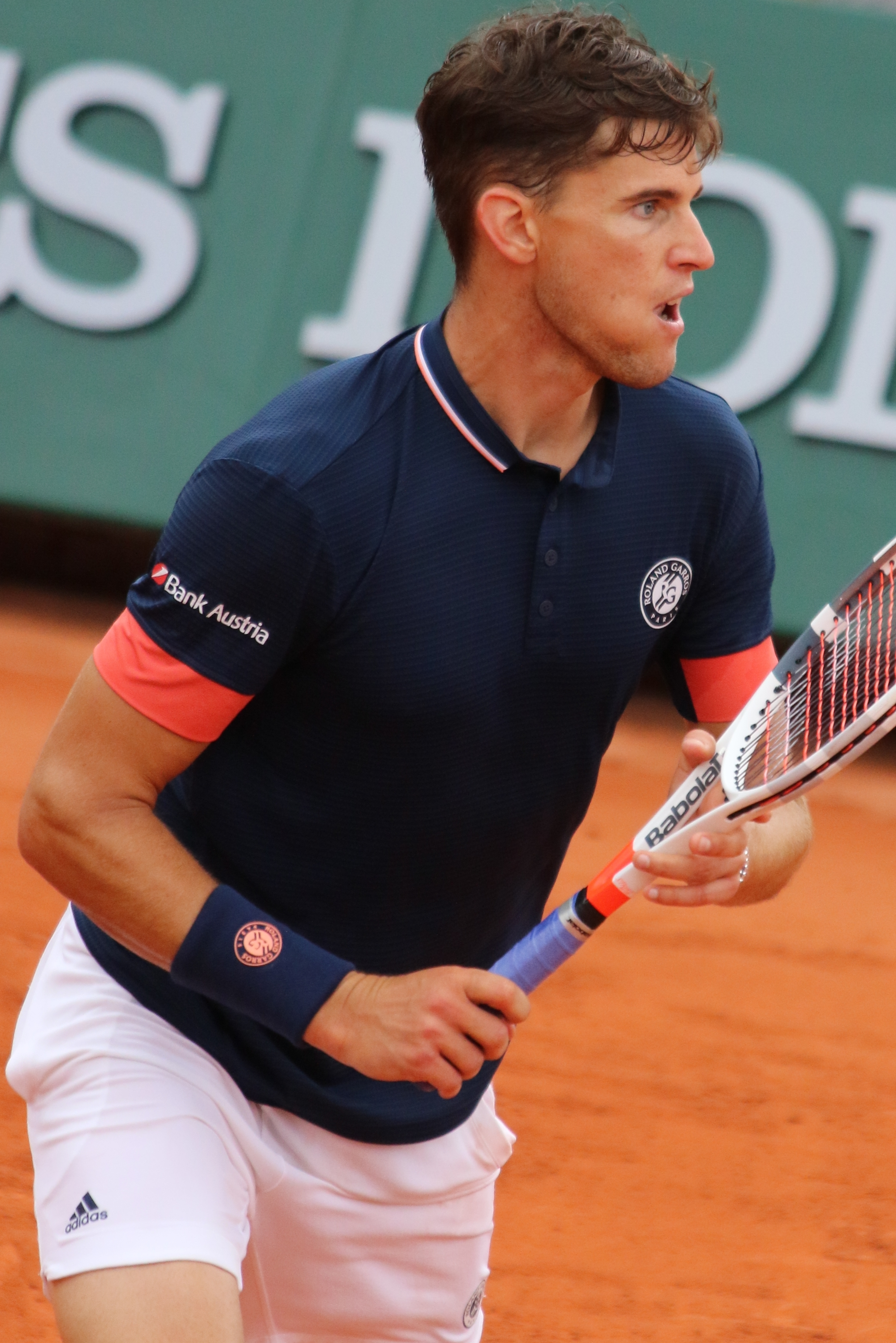
Dominic Thiem (pictured) defeated Alexander Zverev in the Men's singles final to win his first Grand Slam title.

- (Austria) Dominic Thiem def. (Germany) Alexander Zverev, 2–6, 4–6, 6–4, 6–3, 7–6^{(8–6)}

The men's singles tournament began on August 31, with Novak Djokovic holding the top seed and top players Roger Federer and Rafael Nadal opting out. Ten seeded players suffered defeats in the first two rounds, including 9th seed Diego Schwartzman, who lost in the first round to Cameron Norrie. The third round eliminated a further eight seeded players, most notably 4-seed Stefanos Tsitsipas, who fell in a fifth-set tiebreak to Borna Ćorić, and 11-seed Karen Khachanov, who lost to Alex de Minaur despite the latter's second-set bagel and subsequent third-set code violation for racket abuse.

Much of the action in the tournament's fourth round was overshadowed by controversy surrounding top seed Novak Djokovic's match against 20th seed Pablo Carreño Busta. After losing a point while trailing 5–6 in the first set, Djokovic hit a ball out of frustration that hit a line judge in the throat, which violated a Grand Slam rule regarding ball abuse. Djokovic was defaulted from the match by the tournament referee, marking the first time a top-seeded player had been disqualified from a Grand Slam singles tournament. This disqualification ensured that the top half of the men's singles draw would produce a first-time Grand Slam finalist, and that this tournament would be the first Grand Slam since 2004 without Djokovic, Roger Federer, or Rafael Nadal participating in the semifinal round.

The quarterfinals took place on September 8–9. The top two remaining seeds, 2-seed Dominic Thiem and 3-seed Daniil Medvedev, both advanced in straight sets, while 5-seed Alexander Zverev advanced in four sets and 20-seed Pablo Carreño Busta advanced in five. Thiem took his semifinal match over Medvedev in straight sets, while Carreño Busta won the first two sets before losing the final three to Zverev; this was Zverev's first comeback win from two sets down. This set up a final between Thiem, making his fourth Grand Slam finals appearance, and Zverev, making his first; both players were seeking their first Grand Slam title. Zverev, the underdog, jumped out to an early advantage, taking the first and second sets. Thiem battled back in the third and fourth sets. This set up a fifth and final set, which remained close until the end and was eventually won by Thiem in a tiebreak, after four hours and one minute, making Thiem the first new Grand Slam winner in six years. This also marked the first time since Pancho Gonzalez in 1949 that a two-set deficit had been overcome in a US Open final.

=== Women's singles ===
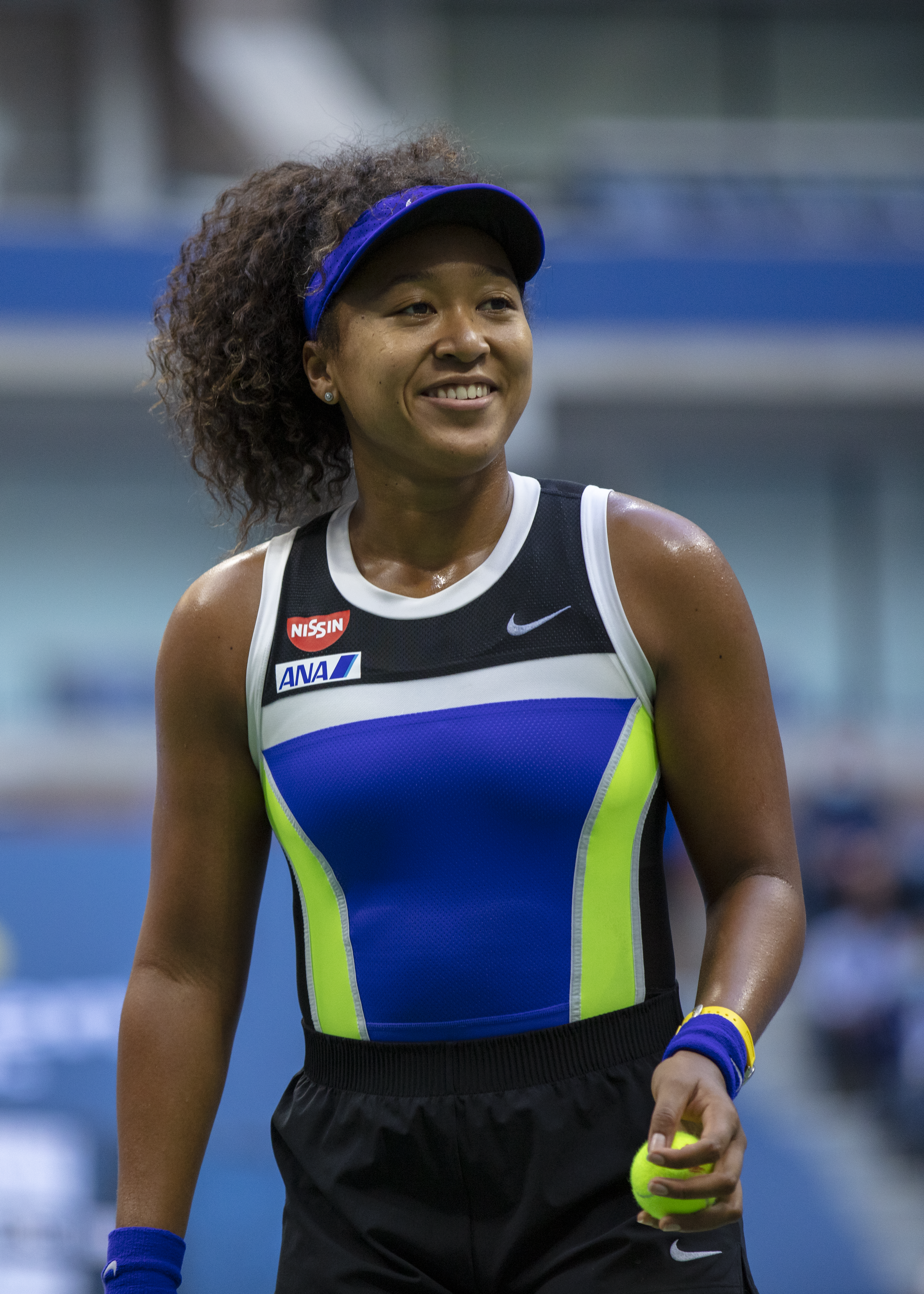
Naomi Osaka (pictured) defeated Victoria Azarenka in the women's singles final to win her third Grand Slam title.

- (Japan) Naomi Osaka def. (Belarus) Victoria Azarenka, 1–6, 6–3, 6–3

The women's singles tournament began August 31, with Karolína Plíšková holding the top seed. 29 of the 32 seeded players in the women's singles draw advanced to the second round, the most since the US Open began seeding 32 singles players rather than 16 in 2001. Serena Williams made history in her first round match against Kristie Ahn by becoming the winningest player in US Open history, having won her 102nd match. The second round, however, saw the exit of eleven seeded players, notably 1-seed Plíšková and 5-seed Aryna Sabalenka, who both fell in the second round in straight sets against Caroline Garcia and Victoria Azarenka, respectively. In the third round, 7-seed Madison Keys was forced to retire from her match against Alizé Cornet in the second set after suffering an injury, putting Cornet through to her first-ever US Open round of 16. The fourth round saw three more top-ten seeds fall, notably 2-seed Sofia Kenin, who lost to Elise Mertens, and 6-seed Petra Kvitová, who was upset by Shelby Rogers.

This left the third- and fourth-seeded players, Serena Williams and Naomi Osaka, as the top two players headed into the quarterfinals. Each faced an unseeded player, as Williams defeated Tsvetana Pironkova in three sets and Osaka beat Rogers in two. The other two quarterfinals saw 28-seed Jennifer Brady defeat 23-seed Yulia Putintseva, and unseeded Victoria Azarenka upset 16-seed Elise Mertens. This left Azarenka as the only unseeded player in the semifinals, where she met Serena Williams in the first semifinal in Grand Slam history to be contested by two mothers. Azarenka's three-set win put her through to her fifth Grand Slam final. She would be met in the final by Osaka, who defeated Brady in three sets to qualify for her third Grand Slam final. In the final, Azarenka got out to an early lead after taking the first set in dominant fashion. Soon after, Osaka improved her play and her "self-described bad attitude", and won four straight games in the second set to level the match. Osaka was victorious in the final set as well, securing her second US Open title and her third Grand Slam singles title.

In each of her seven matches, Osaka entered the stadium wearing a black face mask with the name of a different African-American who died as a result of unjust violence from police or other citizens in the United States, in support of the Black Lives Matter movement and the ongoing George Floyd protests. The seven masks bore the names of Breonna Taylor, Elijah McClain, Ahmaud Arbery, Trayvon Martin, George Floyd, Philando Castile, and Tamir Rice.

=== Men's doubles ===
- (Croatia) Mate Pavić / (Brazil) Bruno Soares def. (Netherlands) Wesley Koolhof / (Croatia) Nikola Mektić, 7–5, 6–3

Coming into the men's doubles tournament, the all-Colombian team of Juan Sebastián Cabal and Robert Farah held the top seed. The first round saw the surprising exit of four of the eight seeded pairs, including the 2-seed pair of Łukasz Kubot and Marcelo Melo and the 4-seed pair of Filip Polášek and Ivan Dodig. Two more seeded pairs dropped out in the second round, as top-seeded Cabal and Farah faltered, as did the 6-seed German pair of Kevin Krawietz and Andreas Mies.

The remaining two seeded pairs met each other in the semifinals, as 8-seed Wesley Koolhof and Nikola Mektić defeated 3-seed Rajeev Ram and Joe Salisbury. The other semifinal saw Jean-Julien Rojer and Horia Tecău fall to Mate Pavić and Bruno Soares; both semifinal matches were decided in two sets. In the final, Pavić and Soares jumped out to a lead as they took the first set 7–5. Koolhoff and Mektić could not respond, and the second set ended in favor of Pavić and Soares, giving them their second and third Grand Slam doubles titles, respectively.

=== Women's doubles ===
- (Germany) Laura Siegemund / (Russia) Vera Zvonareva def. (United States) Nicole Melichar / (China) Xu Yifan, 6–4, 6–4

Entering the women's doubles tournament, the top seed was awarded to Tímea Babos of Hungary and Kristina Mladenovic of France. While the first round saw the exit of only one of the eight seeded pairs in the tournament (the fifth-seeded pair of Bethanie Mattek-Sands and Zhang Shuai were defeated by Asia Muhammad and Taylor Townsend), the second round saw four such occurrences. The bottom three seeded pairs – 6-seed Shuko Aoyama and Ena Shibahara, 7-seed Victoria Azarenka and Sofia Kenin, and 8-seed Anna-Lena Friedsam and Kateřina Siniaková – were all defeated, and the top-seeded pair of Babos and Mladenovic were disqualified as a result of Benoît Paire's positive COVID-19 test, which required Mladenovic, who had reportedly had close contact with Paire, to quarantine and therefore drop out of the tournament. Their match was awarded on a walkover to Gabriela Dabrowski and Alison Riske, and Babos would later refer to the decision as an "injustice", citing the numerous negative COVID-19 tests taken by both of the pair and the clearing of a male athlete in a similar situation the day before.

The tournament progressed to the quarterfinals, where the 2-seed pair of Elise Mertens and Aryna Sabalenka and the 4-seed pair of Květa Peschke and Demi Schuurs were both defeated. In the semifinals, Asia Muhammad and Taylor Townsend were defeated by the 3-seed pair of Nicole Melichar and Xu Yifan. The other semifinal saw Anna Blinkova and Veronika Kudermetova fall to Laura Siegemund and Vera Zvonareva; both semifinals were decided in three sets. This set up a final between the pair of Melichar and Xu and the pair of Siegemund and Zvonareva; the latter team took the final in two sets to win the title. This marked the first Grand Slam women's doubles title for Siegemund and the third for Zvonareva.

=== Wheelchair men's singles ===
- (Japan) Shingo Kunieda def. (United Kingdom) Alfie Hewett, 6–3, 3–6, 7–6^{(7–3)}

The wheelchair men's singles tournament had two seeded players, 1-seed Shingo Kunieda and 2-seed Gustavo Fernández, and six other unseeded players. In the tournament's opening round, the quarterfinals, Kunieda defeated Nicolas Peifer, and Fernández defeated Stéphane Houdet, both in two sets. The quarterfinals also saw Casey Ratzlaff fall in three sets to Joachim Gérard, and Alfie Hewett defeat Gordon Reid in two.

In the semifinals, Kunieda faced Gérard, and bounced back from a first set loss to win in three, while Hewett upset Fernández in three after splitting the first two sets. This set up a final between top-seeded Shingo Kunieda and unseeded Alfie Hewett; the former in his 29th Grand Slam singles final and the latter in his fifth. The match came down to the wire, with each player taking one of the first two sets by a score of 6–3. The third set reached 6–6 and went to a tiebreak, where Kunieda was victorious to win his 24th Grand Slam singles title.

=== Wheelchair women's singles ===
- (Netherlands) Diede de Groot def. (Japan) Yui Kamiji, 6–3, 6–3

The wheelchair women's singles tournament, like the men's competition, was contested by eight players. Two were seeded, 1-seed Diede de Groot and 2-seed Yui Kamiji, while the six others were unseeded. The tournament opened with de Groot defeating Jordanne Whiley and Kamiji defeating Momoko Ohtani, both in straight sets. The other two quarterfinals saw Marjolein Buis eliminate Dana Mathewson in two sets and Angélica Bernal defeat wild card entry Lucy Shuker in three. In the semifinals, both top seeds advanced, with de Groot defeating Buis in three sets and Kamiji beating Bernal in two. This set up a final between the top two seeds, de Groot and Kamiji. The top seeded player, de Groot, did not give Kamiji much of an opportunity for the upset, taking both sets 6–3 and winning her third US Open title.

=== Wheelchair quad singles ===
- (Netherlands) Sam Schröder def. (Australia) Dylan Alcott, 7–6^{(7–5)}, 0–6, 6–4

The wheelchair quad singles competition was not played as a traditional tournament bracket; rather, it was played in a round robin-style tournament with the top two finishers moving on to the championship match. Four players took part in the tournament: 1-seed Dylan Alcott, 2-seed Andy Lapthorne, unseeded David Wagner, and wild card entry Sam Schröder. In round robin play, Alcott topped the standings by winning all three of his matches, beating Lapthorne and Schröder in two sets and Wagner in three. Schröder's rather dominant two-set upset of Lapthorne gave him second place and the other berth in the final; Lapthorne finished the round robin with one win and Wagner finished with none.

The final was contested by top-seeded Alcott and Schröder. The first set was evenly played by both competitors, but was won by Schröder in a tiebreak. Alcott recovered with a second-set bagel to force the game into a third set, which was won by Schröder in upset fashion, 6–4, for his first US Open title. Schröder's win was especially unlikely considering that Alcott was seeking his eleventh Grand Slam title while Schröder was appearing in a Grand Slam event for the first time.

=== Wheelchair men's doubles ===
- (United Kingdom) Alfie Hewett / (United Kingdom) Gordon Reid def. (France) Stéphane Houdet / (France) Nicolas Peifer, 6–4, 6–1

The wheelchair men's doubles tournament was contested by the same eight players who contested the singles event. The top seed was given to the pair of Alfie Hewett and Gordon Reid, with the second seed given to Stéphane Houdet and Nicolas Peifer. Hewett and Reid faced Gustavo Fernández and Shingo Kunieda in the tournament's opening semifinal round, defeating them in two sets, while Houdet and Peifer took down Casey Ratzlaff and Joachim Gérard, also in two. This set up a final between the two top seeds, which was won in two sets by the top-ranked duo of Hewett and Reid.

=== Wheelchair women's doubles ===
- (Japan) Yui Kamiji / (United Kingdom) Jordanne Whiley def. (Netherlands) Marjolein Buis / (Netherlands) Diede de Groot, 6–3, 6–3

As with the men's tournament, the wheelchair women's doubles event was contested by the same group of eight players that played in the singles event. The semifinal round proved not to be a challenge for either of the two seeded pairs, as the 1-seed duo of Marjolein Buis and Diede de Groot defeated Angélica Bernal and Dana Mathewson and the 2-seed pair of Yui Kamiji and Jordanne Whiley defeated Momoko Ohtani and Lucy Shuker, both in straight sets. In the final, Kamiji and Whiley were able to outlast Buis and de Groot, winning both sets by a score of 6–3, and earning their eleventh Grand Slam title together.

=== Wheelchair quad doubles ===
- (Australia) Dylan Alcott / (United Kingdom) Andy Lapthorne def. (Netherlands) Sam Schröder / (United States) David Wagner, 3–6, 6–4, [10–8]

The wheelchair quad doubles event was the smallest at the tournament, with only four players (the same four that contested the singles event) competing. As a result, there was only one match played to determine the champion. In the first set, underdogs Sam Schröder and David Wagner jumped out to an early lead by winning the first set 6–3, but Dylan Alcott and Andy Lapthorne battled back to force a third with a 6–4 second-set victory. The third set was played as a match tiebreak, which was won 10–8 by Alcott and Lapthorne to secure them the wheelchair quad doubles title.

== Point distribution and prize money ==
=== Point distribution ===
As a Grand Slam tournament, the points for the US Open are the highest of all ATP and WTA tournaments. These points determine the world ATP and WTA rankings for men's and women's competition, respectively. Due to the smaller draws and the pandemic, all men's and women's doubles players that made it past the first round received half the points of their singles counterparts, a change from previous years where singles and doubles players received the same number of points in all but the first two rounds. In both singles and doubles, women received slightly higher point totals compared to their male counterparts at each round of the tournament, except for the first and last. Points and rankings for the wheelchair events fall under the jurisdiction of the ITF Wheelchair Tennis Tour, which also places Grand Slams as the highest classification.

The ATP and WTA rankings were both altered in 2020 due to the COVID-19 pandemic. Both rankings were frozen on March 16, 2020, upon the suspension of both tours, and as a result the traditional 52-week ranking system was extended to cover the period from March 2019 to December 2020, with a player's best 18 results in that time period factoring into their point totals. Points earned from the US Open and other 2020 Tour-level tournaments will be dropped from their point totals after 52 weeks or until that respective tournament is played in 2021. Like other tournaments, each player could only count their best result from either the 2019 or 2020 US Open towards their ranking.

Below is a series of tables for each of the competitions showing the ranking points on offer for each event:

Point distribution for senior events
Event	Winner	Finalist	Semifinals	Quarterfinals	Round of 16	Round of 32	Round of 64	Round of 128
Men's singles	2000	1200	720	360	180	90	45	10
Men's doubles	1000	600	360	180	90	0	—	—
Women's singles	2000	1300	780	430	240	130	70	10
Women's doubles	1000	650	390	215	120	10	—	—

Point distribution for wheelchair events
Event	Winner	Finalist	Semifinals	Quarterfinals
Singles	800	500	375	100
Quad singles	800	500	375 / 100	—
Doubles	800	500	100	—
Quad doubles	800	100	—	—

=== Prize money ===
Several days before the tournament began, the prize money pool was announced to be US$53.4 million, a reduction of 6.7% compared to last year's tournament. The prize money for men's and women's singles winners took a large reduction, down 22% to $3 million this year. Prize money at each tier but one of the singles competition saw a reduction in 2020: the winnings for players exiting in the first round rose by 5% but saw no change in second- or third-round exits and saw a decrease in each level past that. Prize money for the men's and women's doubles competitions took big hits as well, as both winning pairs took home 46% less than last year. The total prize pool for the wheelchair competitions was $350,000. In addition to winnings for players, a portion of the prize pool also was given to a relief program funded by the four Grand Slam tournaments, as well as the ITP, ATP Tour, and WTA Tour. A portion of the pool was also designated as being to "make up for" the cancellation of qualification tournaments and the reduced size of the competition.

Prize money for senior singles and doubles events
Event	Winner	Finalist	Semifinals	Quarterfinals	Round of 16	Round of 32	Round of 64	Round of 128
Singles	$3,000,000	$1,500,000	$800,000	$425,000	$250,000	$163,000	$100,000	$61,000
Doubles (per team)	$400,000	$240,000	$130,000	$91,000	$50,000	$30,000	—N/a	—N/a

== Broadcasting and viewership ==
In the United States, ESPN held exclusive rights to the tournament for the sixth year in a row as part of an 11-year, $825 million contract. Tournament matches were viewable on ESPN as well as on ESPN2 and online streaming services ESPN3 and ESPN+. ESPN also held rights to the US Open Series, with the Tennis Channel airing overnight replays of the world feed. Prior to the broadcast of the women's singles final, Mariah Carey premiered the video for her song "Save The Day", which was filmed in front of Arthur Ashe Stadium on the grounds of the Billie Jean King National Tennis Center and which features clips of past US Open champions Venus and Serena Williams, Sloane Stephens, and Naomi Osaka. In the United Kingdom and the Republic of Ireland, Amazon Prime Video held exclusive rights to the tournament.

Viewership as a whole saw a decline from previous years, drawing only 700,000 viewers due to player opt-outs and competition from other broadcasts on television. Overall ratings suffered a 45% decline; viewership of the men's final dropped 48% while the women's final dropped 43%. The men's final saw the lowest viewership since the tournament was picked up by ESPN, as the match competed with Tom Brady's debut appearance for the Tampa Bay Buccaneers in the National Football League (NFL), though the women's final charted as the third-highest in the ESPN era, behind the previous two years.

Preceded by 2020 Australian Open; 2020 Wimbledon canceled	Grand Slams	Succeeded by 2020 French Open
