= 2020 US Open – Women's singles =

Women's singles
- 2020 US Open

Final
- Champion: (Japan) Naomi Osaka
- Runner-up: (Belarus) Victoria Azarenka
- Score: 1–6, 6–3, 6–3

Details
- Draw: 128 (8WC)
- Seeds: 32

Events
Singles	men	women		boys	girls
Doubles	men	women	mixed	boys	girls
WC Singles	men	women	quad
WC Doubles	men	women	quad
Legends	men	women	mixed
- US Open

Naomi Osaka defeated Victoria Azarenka in the final, 1–6, 6–3, 6–3 to win the women's singles tennis title at the 2020 US Open. It was her second US Open title and third major title overall. Osaka became the first player from an Asian country to win three major singles titles, the first woman to win her first three major finals since Jennifer Capriati, and at 22 years of age, the youngest player to win three majors since Maria Sharapova at the 2008 Australian Open. Azarenka, contesting her first major final since the 2013 US Open, was aiming to become the first mother to win a major singles title since Kim Clijsters won the 2011 Australian Open.

Bianca Andreescu was the reigning champion, but withdrew before the tournament due to travel concerns caused by the ongoing COVID-19 pandemic. Citing safety reasons, five other top-ten players (including reigning major champions Ashleigh Barty and Simona Halep) also withdrew from the event. In all, 24 players ranked inside the top 100 were absent from the tournament. The absences of Barty and Halep, respectively world No. 1 and 2, made this the first major since the 2004 Wimbledon Championships not to feature either of the world's top two ranked players.

29 of the 32 seeded women progressed to the second round; the most since the US Open changed from 16 seeds to 32 seeds in 2001.

With her first-round win over Kristie Ahn, Serena Williams surpassed Chris Evert for the most match wins (102) in US Open history. Williams became the first player in history to reach a major semifinal in four decades: the 1990s, 2000s, 2010s and 2020s. With Williams, Azarenka and Tsvetana Pironkova in the quarterfinals, it marked the first time in major history that three mothers did so. The semifinal between Williams and Azarenka was the first semifinal between two mothers in major history. This was Kim Clijsters' first (and only) major appearance since the 2012 US Open, due to her return to the sport in February 2020. She was awarded a wildcard into the main draw, but lost to Ekaterina Alexandrova, and would retire from tennis once again in 2022.

There were no qualifiers this year. The WTA rankings valid on August 3 (also being the rankings from March 16) were used to determine the main-draw entry list.

== Seeds ==
Seeding per WTA rankings.

1. (Czech Republic) Karolína Plíšková (second round)
2. (United States) Sofia Kenin (fourth round)
3. (United States) Serena Williams (semifinals)
4. (Japan) Naomi Osaka (champion)
5. (Belarus) Aryna Sabalenka (second round)
6. (Czech Republic) Petra Kvitová (fourth round)
7. (United States) Madison Keys (third round, retired)
8. (Croatia) Petra Martić (fourth round)
9. (United Kingdom) Johanna Konta (second round)
10. (Spain) Garbiñe Muguruza (second round)
11. (Kazakhstan) Elena Rybakina (second round)
12. (Czech Republic) Markéta Vondroušová (second round)
13. (United States) Alison Riske (second round)
14. (Estonia) Anett Kontaveit (fourth round)
15. (Greece) Maria Sakkari (fourth round)
16. (Belgium) Elise Mertens (quarterfinals)

17. (Germany) Angelique Kerber (fourth round)
18. (Croatia) Donna Vekić (third round)
19. (Ukraine) Dayana Yastremska (second round)
20. (Czech Republic) Karolína Muchová (fourth round)
21. (Russia) Ekaterina Alexandrova (second round)
22. (United States) Amanda Anisimova (third round)
23. (Kazakhstan) Yulia Putintseva (quarterfinals)
24. (Poland) Magda Linette (third round)
25. (China) Zhang Shuai (first round)
26. (United States) Sloane Stephens (third round)
27. (Tunisia) Ons Jabeur (third round)
28. (United States) Jennifer Brady (semifinals)
29. (Russia) Veronika Kudermetova (first round)
30. (France) Kristina Mladenovic (second round)
31. (Latvia) Anastasija Sevastova (second round)
32. (Sweden) Rebecca Peterson (first round)

Click on the seed number of a player to go to their draw section.

== Draw ==
Key

- Q = Qualifier
- WC = Wild card
- LL = Lucky loser
- Alt = Alternate
- ITF = ITF entry
- PR = Protected ranking
- SR = Special ranking
- SE = Special exempt
- JE = Junior exempt
- JR = Junior Accelerator Programme entrant
- CO = College Accelerator Programme entrant
- NG = Next Gen Accelerator Program entrant
- w/o = Walkover
- r = Retired
- d = Defaulted

=== Finals ===
Quarterfinals
28	(United States) Jennifer Brady	6	6
23	(Kazakhstan) Yulia Putintseva	3	2
4	(Japan) Naomi Osaka	6	6
(United States) Shelby Rogers	3	4
PR	(Bulgaria) Tsvetana Pironkova	6	3	2
3	(United States) Serena Williams	4	6	6
(Belarus) Victoria Azarenka	6	6
16	(Belgium) Elise Mertens	1	0

Semifinals
28	(United States) Jennifer Brady	6^{1}	6	3
4	(Japan) Naomi Osaka	7^{7}	3	6
3	(United States) Serena Williams	6	3	3
(Belarus) Victoria Azarenka	1	6	6

Final
4	(Japan) Naomi Osaka	1	6	6
(Belarus) Victoria Azarenka	6	3	3

=== Top half ===
==== Section 1 ====
First round
1	(Czech Republic) Ka Plíšková	6	6
(Ukraine) A Kalinina	4	0
(Italy) J Paolini	3	2
(France) C Garcia	6	6
WC	(United States) C Bellis	6^{13}	6	6
(Germany) T Korpatsch	7^{15}	3	2
(Russia) A Blinkova	3	2
28	(United States) J Brady	6	6
17	(Germany) A Kerber	6	6
(Australia) A Tomljanović	4	4
(United States) C Dolehide	2	2
(Germany) A-L Friedsam	6	6
(United States) A Li	6	2	6
(Netherlands) A Rus	4	6	1
(Germany) T Maria	3	2
13	(United States) A Riske	6	6

Second round
1	(Czech Republic) Ka Plíšková	1	6^{2}
(France) C Garcia	6	7^{7}
WC	(United States) C Bellis	1	2
28	(United States) J Brady	6	6
17	(Germany) A Kerber	6	7^{8}
(Germany) A-L Friedsam	3	6^{6}
(United States) A Li	6	6
13	(United States) A Riske	0	3

Third round
(France) C Garcia	3	3
28	(United States) J Brady	6	6
17	(Germany) A Kerber	6	6
(United States) A Li	3	4

Fourth round
28	(United States) J Brady	6	6
17	(Germany) A Kerber	1	4

==== Section 2 ====
First round
12	(Czech Republic) M Vondroušová	6	6
(Belgium) G Minnen	1	4
(United States) F Di Lorenzo	6	6^{6}	0
(Belarus) A Sasnovich	2	7^{8}	6
(Switzerland) V Golubic	6	6^{2}	2
PR	(Belarus) V Lapko	1	7^{7}	6
WC	(United States) R Montgomery	1	3
23	(Kazakhstan) Y Putintseva	6	6
30	(France) K Mladenovic	7	6
WC	(United States) H Baptiste	5	2
(Russia) V Gracheva	6	7
(Spain) P Badosa	4	5
PR	(Ukraine) K Bondarenko	3	6	6
WC	(United States) A Kiick	6	3	1
(Czech Republic) T Martincová	7	2	4
8	(Croatia) P Martić	5	6	6

Second round
12	(Czech Republic) M Vondroušová	1	2
(Belarus) A Sasnovich	6	6
PR	(Belarus) V Lapko	3	3
23	(Kazakhstan) Y Putintseva	6	6
30	(France) K Mladenovic	6	6^{2}	0
(Russia) V Gracheva	1	7^{7}	6
PR	(Ukraine) K Bondarenko	3	4
8	(Croatia) P Martić	6	6

Third round
(Belarus) A Sasnovich	6	2	1
23	(Kazakhstan) Y Putintseva	3	6	6
(Russia) V Gracheva	3	3
8	(Croatia) P Martić	6	6

Fourth round
23	(Kazakhstan) Y Putintseva	6	2	6
8	(Croatia) P Martić	3	6	4

==== Section 3 ====
First round
4	(Japan) N Osaka	6	5	6
(Japan) M Doi	2	7	2
(Italy) C Giorgi	2	6	7
(Belgium) A Van Uytvanck	6	1	5
(Ukraine) M Kostyuk	6	6
(Russia) D Kasatkina	1	2
(United States) C Gauff	3	7	4
31	(Latvia) A Sevastova	6	5	6
24	(Poland) M Linette	6	4	6
(Australia) M Inglis	1	6	4
(Montenegro) D Kovinić	6	3	6
(Australia) L Cabrera	4	6	2
(United States) UM Arconada	4	6^{2}
(Slovenia) K Juvan	6	7^{7}
(United States) D Collins	7	2	2
14	(Estonia) A Kontaveit	5	6	6

Second round
4	(Japan) N Osaka	6	6
(Italy) C Giorgi	1	2
(Ukraine) M Kostyuk	6	7^{7}
31	(Latvia) A Sevastova	3	6^{5}
24	(Poland) M Linette	6	6^{2}	7^{7}
(Montenegro) D Kovinić	1	7^{7}	6^{4}
(Slovenia) K Juvan	4	1
14	(Estonia) A Kontaveit	6	6

Third round
4	(Japan) N Osaka	6	6^{4}	6
(Ukraine) M Kostyuk	3	7^{7}	2
24	(Poland) M Linette	3	2
14	(Estonia) A Kontaveit	6	6

Fourth round
4	(Japan) N Osaka	6	6
14	(Estonia) A Kontaveit	3	4

==== Section 4 ====
First round
11	(Kazakhstan) E Rybakina	6	6
(Ukraine) K Zavatska	3	0
PR	(Russia) I Khromacheva	2	2
(United States) S Rogers	6	6
(United States) M Brengle	6	6
Alt	(Australia) Ar Rodionova	2	2
(Australia) A Sharma	3	7^{7}	6^{2}
19	(Ukraine) D Yastremska	6	6^{4}	7^{7}
32	(Sweden) R Peterson	6^{1}	4
(Belgium) K Flipkens	7^{7}	6
(Czech Republic) M Bouzková	6	2	6^{3}
(United States) J Pegula	3	6	7^{7}
(Ukraine) K Kozlova	6	7
(United States) W Osuigwe	3	5
(Romania) I-C Begu	3	2
6	(Czech Republic) P Kvitová	6	6

Second round
11	(Kazakhstan) E Rybakina	5	1
(United States) S Rogers	7	6
(United States) M Brengle	6	6
19	(Ukraine) D Yastremska	2	3
(Belgium) K Flipkens	6^{1}	7^{7}	3
(United States) J Pegula	7^{7}	6^{3}	6
(Ukraine) K Kozlova	6^{3}	2
6	(Czech Republic) P Kvitová	7^{7}	6

Third round
(United States) S Rogers	6	6
(United States) M Brengle	2	4
(United States) J Pegula	4	3
6	(Czech Republic) P Kvitová	6	6

Fourth round
(United States) S Rogers	7^{7}	3	7^{8}
6	(Czech Republic) P Kvitová	6^{5}	6	6^{6}

=== Bottom half ===
==== Section 5 ====
First round
7	(United States) M Keys	6	6
(Hungary) T Babos	1	1
(Switzerland) J Teichmann	6^{3}	2
(Spain) A Bolsova	7^{7}	6
(United States) L Davis	3	6	0
(France) A Cornet	6	1	6
(Belgium) Y Bonaventure	4	6	6
25	(China) S Zhang	6	3	2
18	(Croatia) D Vekić	3	7^{8}	6
(Czech Republic) Kr Plíšková	6	6^{6}	4
(Romania) PM Țig	6	6
(Japan) K Nara	1	0
PR	(Bulgaria) T Pironkova	6	6
(Russia) L Samsonova	2	3
(Japan) N Hibino	4	4
10	(Spain) G Muguruza	6	6

Second round
7	(United States) M Keys	6	6
(Spain) A Bolsova	2	1
(France) A Cornet	7^{7}	6
(Belgium) Y Bonaventure	6^{4}	3
18	(Croatia) D Vekić	6	6
(Romania) PM Țig	2	1
PR	(Bulgaria) T Pironkova	7	6
10	(Spain) G Muguruza	5	3

Third round
7	(United States) M Keys	6^{4}	2^{r}
(France) A Cornet	7^{7}	3
18	(Croatia) D Vekić	4	1
PR	(Bulgaria) T Pironkova	6	6

Fourth round
(France) A Cornet	4	7^{7}	3
PR	(Bulgaria) T Pironkova	6	6^{5}	6

==== Section 6 ====
First round
15	(Greece) M Sakkari	6	3	7
(Switzerland) S Vögele	3	6	5
(United States) B Pera	7^{7}	6
(Kazakhstan) Z Diyas	6^{4}	0
(Russia) N Vikhlyantseva	6^{3}	2
WC	(United States) K Scott	7^{7}	6
(Bulgaria) V Tomova	5	5
22	(United States) A Anisimova	7	7
26	(United States) S Stephens	6	6
(Romania) M Buzărnescu	3	3
Alt	(United States) A Muhammad	1	2
(Belarus) O Govortsova	6	6
(Russia) M Gasparyan	6	6^{0}	6
(Puerto Rico) M Puig	3	7^{7}	0
(United States) K Ahn	5	3
3	(United States) S Williams	7	6

Second round
15	(Greece) M Sakkari	2	6	6
(United States) B Pera	6	3	2
WC	(United States) K Scott	6	4	1
22	(United States) A Anisimova	4	6	6
26	(United States) S Stephens	6	6
(Belarus) O Govortsova	2	2
(Russia) M Gasparyan	2	4
3	(United States) S Williams	6	6

Third round
15	(Greece) M Sakkari	6	6
22	(United States) A Anisimova	3	1
26	(United States) S Stephens	6	2	2
3	(United States) S Williams	2	6	6

Fourth round
15	(Greece) M Sakkari	3	7^{8}	3
3	(United States) S Williams	6	6^{6}	6

==== Section 7 ====
First round
5	(Belarus) A Sabalenka	7^{7}	6
(France) O Dodin	6^{1}	4
(Belarus) V Azarenka	6	6
(Austria) B Haas	1	2
WC	(United States) S Vickery	6	6
(United States) T Townsend	2	4
(Poland) I Świątek	6	6
29	(Russia) V Kudermetova	3	3
20	(Czech Republic) K Muchová	6	7
(United States) V Williams	3	5
(Russia) A Kalinskaya	6	6
(Serbia) N Stojanović	4	3
(Romania) S Cîrstea	6	7
(United States) C McHale	4	5
(United Kingdom) H Watson	6^{7}	1
9	(United Kingdom) J Konta	7^{9}	6

Second round
5	(Belarus) A Sabalenka	1	3
(Belarus) V Azarenka	6	6
WC	(United States) S Vickery	7^{7}	3	4
(Poland) I Świątek	6^{5}	6	6
20	(Czech Republic) K Muchová	6	7^{7}
(Russia) A Kalinskaya	3	6^{4}
(Romania) S Cîrstea	2	7^{7}	6
9	(United Kingdom) J Konta	6	6^{5}	4

Third round
(Belarus) V Azarenka	6	6
(Poland) I Świątek	4	2
20	(Czech Republic) K Muchová	6	2	7^{9}
(Romania) S Cîrstea	3	6	6^{7}

Fourth round
(Belarus) V Azarenka	5	6	6
20	(Czech Republic) K Muchová	7	1	4

==== Section 8 ====
First round
16	(Belgium) E Mertens	6	6
(Germany) L Siegemund	2	2
WC	(United States) C Liu	2	4
(Spain) S Sorribes Tormo	6	6
(Slovakia) V Kužmová	4	1
(United States) C McNally	6	6
WC	(Belgium) K Clijsters	6	5	1
21	(Russia) E Alexandrova	3	7	6
27	(Tunisia) O Jabeur	6	7^{8}
(Poland) K Kawa	2	6^{6}
(Czech Republic) K Siniaková	1	2
(Estonia) K Kanepi	6	6
PR	(Russia) V Zvonareva	4	5
(Canada) L Fernandez	6	7
(Belgium) Y Wickmayer	2	2
2	(United States) S Kenin	6	6

Second round
16	(Belgium) E Mertens	6	7
(Spain) S Sorribes Tormo	3	5
(United States) C McNally	4	6	7^{7}
21	(Russia) E Alexandrova	6	3	6^{2}
27	(Tunisia) O Jabeur	7^{10}	6
(Estonia) K Kanepi	6^{8}	0
(Canada) L Fernandez	4	3
2	(United States) S Kenin	6	6

Third round
16	(Belgium) E Mertens	7	6
(United States) C McNally	5	1
27	(Tunisia) O Jabeur	6^{4}	3
2	(United States) S Kenin	7^{7}	6

Fourth round
16	(Belgium) E Mertens	6	6
2	(United States) S Kenin	3	3

== Other entry information ==
=== Wild cards ===
- (United States) Hailey Baptiste
- (United States) Catherine Bellis
- (Belgium) Kim Clijsters
- (United States) Claire Liu
- (United States) Allie Kiick
- (United States) Robin Montgomery
- (United States) Katrina Scott
- (United States) Sachia Vickery

=== Protected ranking ===
- (Ukraine) Kateryna Bondarenko (85)
- (Russia) Irina Khromacheva (137)
- (Belarus) Vera Lapko (120)
- (Bulgaria) Tsvetana Pironkova (123)
- (Russia) Vera Zvonareva (78)

=== Alternates ===
- (United States) Asia Muhammad
- (Australia) Arina Rodionova

=== Withdrawals ===
- (Canada) Bianca Andreescu → replaced by (Belarus) Olga Govortsova
- (Australia) Ashleigh Barty → replaced by (Belarus) Aliaksandra Sasnovich
- (Switzerland) Belinda Bencic → replaced by (Austria) Barbara Haas
- (Netherlands) Kiki Bertens → replaced by (United States) Francesca Di Lorenzo
- (Romania) Ana Bogdan → replaced by (Poland) Katarzyna Kawa
- (Russia) Vitalia Diatchenko → replaced by (United States) Asia Muhammad
- (France) Fiona Ferro → replaced by (United States) Caroline Dolehide
- (Germany) Julia Görges → replaced by (Belgium) Ysaline Bonaventure
- (Romania) Simona Halep → replaced by (Russia) Irina Khromacheva
- (Slovenia) Polona Hercog → replaced by (Belgium) Yanina Wickmayer
- (Chinese Taipei) Hsieh Su-wei → replaced by (United States) Usue Maitane Arconada
- (Czech Republic) Barbora Krejčíková → replaced by (Bulgaria) Viktoriya Tomova
- (Russia) Svetlana Kuznetsova → replaced by (Czech Republic) Tereza Martincová
- (Latvia) Jeļena Ostapenko → replaced by (United States) Whitney Osuigwe
- (Russia) Anastasia Pavlyuchenkova → replaced by (Belarus) Vera Lapko
- (China) Peng Shuai → replaced by (Australia) Lizette Cabrera
- (Germany) Andrea Petkovic → replaced by (Ukraine) Marta Kostyuk
- (Russia) Anastasia Potapova → replaced by (United States) Caty McNally
- (Australia) Samantha Stosur → replaced by (Australia) Astra Sharma
- (Czech Republic) Barbora Strýcová → replaced by (United States) Ann Li
- (Spain) Carla Suárez Navarro → replaced by (Japan) Kurumi Nara
- (Ukraine) Elina Svitolina → replaced by (Russia) Natalia Vikhlyantseva
- (China) Wang Qiang → replaced by (Romania) Mihaela Buzărnescu
- (China) Wang Xiyu → replaced by (Australia) Arina Rodionova (Note: Priscilla Hon was the next player initially entered into the main draw, but she later withdrew due to a hip injury.) (Note: After Hon's withdrawal from the event, Lesia Tsurenko was the next player initially entered into the main draw, but withdrew citing injury setbacks.)
- (China) Wang Yafan → replaced by (Bulgaria) Tsvetana Pironkova
- (China) Zheng Saisai → replaced by (Slovenia) Kaja Juvan
- (China) Zhu Lin → replaced by (Switzerland) Viktorija Golubic
- (Slovenia) Tamara Zidanšek → replaced by (Ukraine) Anhelina Kalinina

† – not included on entry list
& – withdrew from entry list

== Championship match statistics ==
Category	(Japan) Osaka	(Belarus) Azarenka
1st serve %	51/79 (65%)	68/91 (75%)
1st serve points won	31 of 51 = 61%	40 of 68 = 59%
2nd serve points won	13 of 27 = 48%	9 of 23 = 39%
Total service points won	45 of 79 = 56.96%	49 of 91 = 53.85%
Aces	6	3
Double faults	2	2
Winners	34	30
Unforced errors	26	23
Net points won	6 of 12 = 50%	11 of 16 = 69%
Break points converted	5 of 12 = 42%	5 of 10 = 50%
Return points won	42 of 91 = 46%	34 of 79 = 43%
Total points won	87	83

Preceded by 2020 Australian Open – Women's singles	Grand Slam women's singles	Succeeded by 2020 French Open – Women's singles
