= 2020 US Open – Women's doubles =

Women's doubles
- 2020 US Open

Final
- Champions: (Germany) Laura Siegemund (Russia) Vera Zvonareva
- Runners-up: (United States) Nicole Melichar (China) Xu Yifan
- Score: 6–4, 6–4

Details
- Draw: 32
- Seeds: 8

Events
Singles	men	women		boys	girls
Doubles	men	women	mixed	boys	girls
WC Singles	men	women	quad
WC Doubles	men	women	quad
Legends	men	women	mixed
← 2019 ·	US Open	· 2021 →

Elise Mertens and Aryna Sabalenka were the defending champions, but lost in the quarterfinals to Laura Siegemund and Vera Zvonareva.

Siegemund and Zvonareva went on to win the title in their first event together, beating Nicole Melichar and Xu Yifan in the final, 6–4, 6–4. This was the first time since 2006 that an unseeded team won the US Open women's doubles titles; incidentally, Zvonareva was part of this unseeded team. This was Zvonareva's third Grand Slam title in women's doubles, fifth Grand Slam title overall, her first Grand Slam title since the 2012 Australian Open women's doubles, and her first U.S. Open title since the aforementioned title in 2006. It was Siegemund's first Grand Slam women's doubles title, and her second Grand Slam title overall.

== Seeds ==
1. (Hungary) Tímea Babos / (France) Kristina Mladenovic (second round, withdrew, due to COVID-19)
2. (Belgium) Elise Mertens / (Belarus) Aryna Sabalenka (quarterfinals)
3. (United States) Nicole Melichar / (China) Xu Yifan (final)
4. (Czech Republic) Květa Peschke / (Netherlands) Demi Schuurs (quarterfinals)

5. (United States) Bethanie Mattek-Sands / (China) Zhang Shuai (first round)
6. (Japan) Shuko Aoyama / (Japan) Ena Shibahara (second round)
7. (Belarus) Victoria Azarenka / (United States) Sofia Kenin (second round)
8. (Germany) Anna-Lena Friedsam / (Czech Republic) Kateřina Siniaková (second round)

== Draw ==
=== Key ===
- Q = Qualifier
- WC = Wild card
- LL = Lucky loser
- Alt = Alternate
- SE = Special exempt
- PR = Protected ranking
- ITF = ITF entry
- JE = Junior exempt
- w/o = Walkover
- r = Retired
- d = Defaulted
- SR = Special ranking

=== Finals ===
Semifinals
(United States) Asia Muhammad (United States) Taylor Townsend	4	6	6^{7}
3	(United States) Nicole Melichar (China) Xu Yifan	6	3	7^{9}
(Russia) Anna Blinkova (Russia) Veronika Kudermetova	7	3	5
PR	(Germany) Laura Siegemund (Russia) Vera Zvonareva	5	6	7

Final
3	(United States) Nicole Melichar (China) Xu Yifan	4	4
PR	(Germany) Laura Siegemund (Russia) Vera Zvonareva	6	6

=== Top half ===
First round
1	(Hungary) T Babos (France) K Mladenovic	6	6
(United States) K Christian (Mexico) G Olmos	2	2
(Canada) G Dabrowski (United States) A Riske	6	6
PR	(Russia) N Dzalamidze (Russia) I Khromacheva	3	2
(Romania) R Olaru (Spain) S Sorribes Tormo	3	2
(Czech Republic) L Hradecká (Slovenia) A Klepač	6	6
(United States) A Muhammad (United States) T Townsend	3	6	6
5	(United States) B Mattek-Sands (China) S Zhang	6	2	1
3	(United States) N Melichar (China) Y Xu	6	7^{7}
(Belgium) K Flipkens (Belgium) A Van Uytvanck	4	6^{4}
(United States) C Gauff (United States) C McNally	7	6
WC	(United States) H Baptiste (United States) W Osuigwe	5	1
(Ukraine) L Kichenok (Ukraine) N Kichenok	4	7	3
(United States) H Carter (Brazil) L Stefani	6	5	6
WC	(United States) A Li (United States) B Pera	4	5
6	(Japan) S Aoyama (Japan) E Shibahara	6	7

Second round
1	(Hungary) T Babos (France) K Mladenovic
(Canada) G Dabrowski (United States) A Riske	w/o
(Czech Republic) L Hradecká (Slovenia) A Klepač	3	7^{8}	0
(United States) A Muhammad (United States) T Townsend	6	6^{6}	6
3	(United States) N Melichar (China) Y Xu	7^{7}	7^{7}
(United States) C Gauff (United States) C McNally	6^{4}	6^{2}
(United States) H Carter (Brazil) L Stefani	6	0	6
6	(Japan) S Aoyama (Japan) E Shibahara	4	6	4

Quarterfinals
(Canada) G Dabrowski (United States) A Riske	4	2
(United States) A Muhammad (United States) T Townsend	6	6
3	(United States) N Melichar (China) Y Xu	6	6
(United States) H Carter (Brazil) L Stefani	2	3

Semifinals
(United States) A Muhammad (United States) T Townsend	4	6	6^{7}
3	(United States) N Melichar (China) Y Xu	6	3	7^{9}

=== Bottom half ===
First round
8	(Germany) A-L Friedsam (Czech Republic) K Siniaková	6	6
WC	(United States) UM Arconada (United States) C McHale	4	3
(Japan) N Hibino (Japan) M Ninomiya	4	7	4
(Russia) A Blinkova (Russia) V Kudermetova	6	5	6
(United States) J Brady (United States) C Dolehide	6	4	5
(Georgia (country)) O Kalashnikova (Russia) A Kudryavtseva	2	6	7
(Canada) S Fichman (Croatia) D Jurak	2	6^{6}
4	(Czech Republic) K Peschke (Netherlands) D Schuurs	6	7^{8}
7	(Belarus) V Azarenka (United States) S Kenin	2	6	6
(Australia) E Perez (Australia) S Sanders	6	2	2
(Chile) A Guarachi (United States) D Krawczyk	3	0
PR	(Germany) L Siegemund (Russia) V Zvonareva	6	6
WC	(United States) J Pegula (United States) S Rogers	6	6
(Slovakia) V Kužmová (Belarus) A Sasnovich	1	4
(Australia) Ar Rodionova (United States) S Santamaria	2	0
2	(Belgium) E Mertens (Belarus) A Sabalenka	6	6

Second round
8	(Germany) A-L Friedsam (Czech Republic) K Siniaková	3	6	1
(Russia) A Blinkova (Russia) V Kudermetova	6	3	6
(Georgia (country)) O Kalashnikova (Russia) A Kudryavtseva	2	5
4	(Czech Republic) K Peschke (Netherlands) D Schuurs	6	7
7	(Belarus) V Azarenka (United States) S Kenin	6^{4}	3
PR	(Germany) L Siegemund (Russia) V Zvonareva	7^{7}	6
WC	(United States) J Pegula (United States) S Rogers	3	6^{5}
2	(Belgium) E Mertens (Belarus) A Sabalenka	6	7^{7}

Quarterfinals
(Russia) A Blinkova (Russia) V Kudermetova	6	6
4	(Czech Republic) K Peschke (Netherlands) D Schuurs	4	2
PR	(Germany) L Siegemund (Russia) V Zvonareva	6	7^{7}
2	(Belgium) E Mertens (Belarus) A Sabalenka	4	6^{1}

Semifinals
(Russia) A Blinkova (Russia) V Kudermetova	7	3	5
PR	(Germany) L Siegemund (Russia) V Zvonareva	5	6	7

== Other entry information ==
=== Wild cards ===
- (United States) Usue Maitane Arconada / (United States) Christina McHale
- (United States) Hailey Baptiste / (United States) Whitney Osuigwe
- (United States) Ann Li / (United States) Bernarda Pera
- (United States) Jessica Pegula / (United States) Shelby Rogers

=== Protected ranking ===
- (Russia) Natela Dzalamidze / (Russia) Irina Khromacheva
- (Germany) Laura Siegemund / (Russia) Vera Zvonareva (Winner)
