= 2020 US Open – Men's doubles =

Men's doubles
- 2020 US Open

Final
- Champions: (Croatia) Mate Pavić (Brazil) Bruno Soares
- Runners-up: (Netherlands) Wesley Koolhof (Croatia) Nikola Mektić
- Score: 7–5, 6–3

Details
- Draw: 32
- Seeds: 8

Events
Singles	men	women		boys	girls
Doubles	men	women	mixed	boys	girls
WC Singles	men	women	quad
WC Doubles	men	women	quad
Legends	men	women	mixed
← 2019 ·	US Open	· 2021 →

Mate Pavić and Bruno Soares defeated Wesley Koolhof and Nikola Mektić in the final, 7–5, 6–3 to win the men's doubles tennis title at the 2020 US Open. They became the first unseeded team to win the title since 2000. With the win, Pavić claimed his second major men's doubles title (after the 2018 Australian Open), and Soares won his third major men's doubles title (after the 2016 Australian and US Opens).

Juan Sebastián Cabal and Robert Farah were the defending champions, but lost in the second round to Jean-Julien Rojer and Horia Tecău.

== Seeds ==
1. (Colombia) Juan Sebastián Cabal / (Colombia) Robert Farah (second round)
2. (Poland) Łukasz Kubot / (Brazil) Marcelo Melo (first round)
3. (United States) Rajeev Ram / (United Kingdom) Joe Salisbury (semifinals)
4. (Croatia) Ivan Dodig / (Slovakia) Filip Polášek (first round)
5. (Spain) Marcel Granollers / (Argentina) Horacio Zeballos (first round)
6. (Germany) Kevin Krawietz / (Germany) Andreas Mies (second round)
7. (South Africa) Raven Klaasen / (Austria) Oliver Marach (first round)
8. (Netherlands) Wesley Koolhof / (Croatia) Nikola Mektić (final)

== Draw ==
=== Key ===
- Q = Qualifier
- WC = Wild card
- LL = Lucky loser
- Alt = Alternate
- SE = Special exempt
- PR = Protected ranking
- ITF = ITF entry
- JE = Junior exempt
- w/o = Walkover
- r = Retired
- d = Defaulted
- SR = Special ranking

=== Finals ===
Semifinals
(Netherlands) Jean-Julien Rojer (Romania) Horia Tecău	4	5
(Croatia) Mate Pavić (Brazil) Bruno Soares	6	7
3	(United States) Rajeev Ram (United Kingdom) Joe Salisbury	6^{3}	4
8	(Netherlands) Wesley Koolhof (Croatia) Nikola Mektić	7^{7}	6

Final
(Croatia) Mate Pavić (Brazil) Bruno Soares	7	6
8	(Netherlands) Wesley Koolhof (Croatia) Nikola Mektić	5	3

=== Top half ===
First round
1	(Colombia) JS Cabal (Colombia) R Farah	6	6
(Austria) J Melzer (France) É Roger-Vasselin	2	3
(El Salvador) M Arévalo (United Kingdom) J O'Mara	7^{7}	2	4
(Netherlands) J-J Rojer (Romania) H Tecău	6^{3}	6	6
WC	(United States) E Escobedo (United States) N Rubin	2	4
(India) R Bopanna (Canada) D Shapovalov	6	6
(Australia) M Purcell (Australia) L Saville	6^{4}	7^{7}	4
6	(Germany) K Krawietz (Germany) A Mies	7^{7}	6^{5}	6
4	(Croatia) I Dodig (Slovakia) F Polášek	3	5
(United Kingdom) J Murray (United Kingdom) N Skupski	6	7
(Brazil) M Demoliner (Netherlands) M Middelkoop	6^{4}	7^{7}	6
(France) N Mahut (Germany) J-L Struff	7^{7}	6^{5}	3
(United Kingdom) D Inglot (Pakistan) A-u-H Qureshi	7^{7}	6^{2}	6^{5}
PR	(United States) J Sock (United States) J Withrow	6^{5}	7^{7}	7^{7}
(Croatia) M Pavić (Brazil) B Soares	3	6	6
5	(Spain) M Granollers (Argentina) H Zeballos	6	4	4

Second round
1	(Colombia) JS Cabal (Colombia) R Farah	6	3	4
(Netherlands) J-J Rojer (Romania) H Tecău	4	6	6
(India) R Bopanna (Canada) D Shapovalov	4	6	6
6	(Germany) K Krawietz (Germany) A Mies	6	4	3
(United Kingdom) J Murray (United Kingdom) N Skupski	6	6
(Brazil) M Demoliner (Netherlands) M Middelkoop	3	2
PR	(United States) J Sock (United States) J Withrow	7	6^{5}	4
(Croatia) M Pavić (Brazil) B Soares	5	7^{7}	6

Quarterfinals
(Netherlands) J-J Rojer (Romania) H Tecău	7	7
(India) R Bopanna (Canada) D Shapovalov	5	5
(United Kingdom) J Murray (United Kingdom) N Skupski	2	6^{4}
(Croatia) M Pavić (Brazil) B Soares	6	7^{7}

Semifinals
(Netherlands) J-J Rojer (Romania) H Tecău	4	5
(Croatia) M Pavić (Brazil) B Soares	6	7

=== Bottom half ===
First round
7	(South Africa) R Klaasen (Austria) O Marach	3	6^{5}
(New Zealand) M Daniell (Austria) P Oswald	6	7^{7}
(United Kingdom) L Bambridge (Japan) B McLachlan	3	2
WC	(United States) C Eubanks (United States) M McDonald	6	6
(France) J Chardy (France) F Martin	7	6^{5}	5
WC	(United States) C Harrison (United States) R Harrison	5	7^{7}	7
(United States) A Krajicek (Croatia) F Škugor	2	7^{7}	3
3	(United States) R Ram (United Kingdom) J Salisbury	6	6^{5}	6
8	(Netherlands) W Koolhof (Croatia) N Mektić	6	3	6
(Serbia) N Ćaćić (India) D Sharan	4	6	3
(Italy) S Bolelli (Argentina) M González	6	6
(Mexico) S González (United Kingdom) K Skupski	4	3
WC	(United States) N Lammons (United States) N Monroe	4	2
(Australia) J Peers (New Zealand) M Venus	6	6
(Belgium) S Gillé (Belgium) J Vliegen	6	6
2	(Poland) Ł Kubot (Brazil) M Melo	2	4

Second round
(New Zealand) M Daniell (Austria) P Oswald	6^{5}	3
WC	(United States) C Eubanks (United States) M McDonald	7^{7}	6
WC	(United States) C Harrison (United States) R Harrison	2	4
3	(United States) R Ram (United Kingdom) J Salisbury	6	6
8	(Netherlands) W Koolhof (Croatia) N Mektić	6	6
(Italy) S Bolelli (Argentina) M González	4	3
(Australia) J Peers (New Zealand) M Venus	4	4
(Belgium) S Gillé (Belgium) J Vliegen	6	6

Quarterfinals
WC	(United States) C Eubanks (United States) M McDonald	2	6^{5}
3	(United States) R Ram (United Kingdom) J Salisbury	6	7^{7}
8	(Netherlands) W Koolhof (Croatia) N Mektić	7^{8}	6
(Belgium) S Gillé (Belgium) J Vliegen	6^{6}	3

Semifinals
3	(United States) R Ram (United Kingdom) J Salisbury	6^{3}	4
8	(Netherlands) W Koolhof (Croatia) N Mektić	7^{7}	6

== Other entry information ==
=== Wild cards ===
- (United States) Ernesto Escobedo / (United States) Noah Rubin
- (United States) Christopher Eubanks / (United States) Mackenzie McDonald
- (United States) Christian Harrison / (United States) Ryan Harrison
- (United States) Nathaniel Lammons / (United States) Nicholas Monroe

=== Protected ranking ===
- (United States) Jack Sock / (United States) Jackson Withrow
