= 2020 US Open – Men's singles =

Tennis tournament

Men's singles
- 2020 US Open

Final
- Champion: (Austria) Dominic Thiem
- Runner-up: (Germany) Alexander Zverev
- Score: 2–6, 4–6, 6–4, 6–3, 7–6^{(8–6)}

Details
- Draw: 128 (8WC)
- Seeds: 32

Events
Singles	men	women		boys	girls
Doubles	men	women	mixed	boys	girls
WC Singles	men	women	quad
WC Doubles	men	women	quad
Legends	men	women	mixed
- US Open

Dominic Thiem defeated Alexander Zverev in the final, 2–6, 4–6, 6–4, 6–3, 7–6^{(8–6)} to win the men's singles tennis title at the 2020 US Open. It was his first and only major title, following three previous runner-up finishes. Thiem was the first man to come back from two sets down in a US Open final in the Open Era, the first to do so overall since 1949, and the first to do so in any major final since Gastón Gaudio at the 2004 French Open. Both players served for the championship in the final set (Zverev at 5–3 and Thiem at 6–5), but both were broken at 30. This was the first time that the US Open title was decided by a fifth set tie-break, 50 years after the rule was introduced in 1970.

Thiem's victory made him the first man born in the 1990s to win a singles major, the first Austrian to win a singles major since Thomas Muster at the 1995 French Open, and the first new male major singles champion since Marin Čilić won the 2014 US Open. The gap between Čilić and Thiem's titles was the longest between two new major singles champions in the history of men's tennis, surpassing the previous longest gap between Juan Martín del Potro and Andy Murray respectively at the 2009 and 2012 editions of the US Open. It was also Thiem's 17th and last career ATP Tour title. Thiem remains the last player to date with a one-handed backhand to win a major singles title. Zverev was the youngest man to reach a major final since Novak Djokovic at the 2010 US Open, the first German man to reach a major final since Rainer Schüttler at the 2003 Australian Open and the first German man to contest the US Open final since Michael Stich in 1994. This was the first (and thus far only) men's final at any major to be contested by two players born in the 1990s.

Rafael Nadal was the reigning champion, but chose not to participate due to both safety concerns related to the ongoing COVID-19 pandemic and the short amount of time between the US Open and the rescheduled European clay court season. This marked the first time since the 1999 US Open that both Nadal and Roger Federer (who was recovering from a knee surgery) were absent from a major.

There were no qualifiers this year. The ATP rankings valid on August 3 (being the rankings from March 16) were used to determine the main-draw entry list.

World No. 1 Novak Djokovic was defaulted from the tournament during his fourth-round match against Pablo Carreño Busta. After being broken to trail 6–5 in the first set, Djokovic frustratedly hit a ball towards the baseline and wound up hitting a line judge in the throat. Djokovic's unbeaten 26–0 2020 season, as well as his 29-match winning streak (extending back to the 2019 Davis Cup Finals), ended as a result. Djokovic was the first player to be defaulted from a major since Stefan Koubek at the 2000 French Open.

Djokovic's default from the tournament guaranteed a first-time major finalist in the top half of the draw. His disqualification also meant this would be the first major since the 2004 French Open not to feature any of the Big Three in the semifinals. This would mark just the second time in the Open Era in which none of the quarterfinalists had previously won a major, the first instance of this rare occurrence was the 2003 Wimbledon Championships. Additionally, it was the first major men's singles tournament not to have been won by Djokovic, Federer or Nadal since Stan Wawrinka at the 2016 US Open. Additionally, it meant this would be the first major won by a player under the age of 30 since the 2016 Wimbledon Championships. For the first (and only) time in major history, all of the male quarterfinalists were born in the 1990s.

== Seeds ==
All seedings per ATP rankings.

1. (Serbia) Novak Djokovic (fourth round, defaulted)
2. (Austria) Dominic Thiem (champion)
3. (Russia) Daniil Medvedev (semifinals)
4. (Greece) Stefanos Tsitsipas (third round)
5. (Germany) Alexander Zverev (final)
6. (Italy) Matteo Berrettini (fourth round)
7. (Belgium) David Goffin (fourth round)
8. (Spain) Roberto Bautista Agut (third round)
9. (Argentina) Diego Schwartzman (first round)
10. (Russia) Andrey Rublev (quarterfinals)
11. (Russia) Karen Khachanov (third round)
12. (Canada) Denis Shapovalov (quarterfinals)
13. (Chile) Cristian Garín (second round)
14. (Bulgaria) Grigor Dimitrov (second round)
15. (Canada) Félix Auger-Aliassime (fourth round)
16. (United States) John Isner (first round)

17. (France) Benoît Paire (withdrew due to positive COVID-19 test)
18. (Serbia) Dušan Lajović (first round)
19. (United States) Taylor Fritz (third round)
20. (Spain) Pablo Carreño Busta (semifinals)
21. (Australia) Alex de Minaur (quarterfinals)
22. (Georgia (country)) Nikoloz Basilashvili (first round)
23. (United Kingdom) Dan Evans (second round)
24. (Poland) Hubert Hurkacz (second round)
25. (Canada) Milos Raonic (second round)
26. (Serbia) Filip Krajinović (third round)
27. (Croatia) Borna Ćorić (quarterfinals)
28. (Germany) Jan-Lennard Struff (third round)
29. (Argentina) Guido Pella (first round)
30. (Norway) Casper Ruud (third round)
31. (Croatia) Marin Čilić (third round)
32. (France) Adrian Mannarino (third round)

Click on the seed number of a player to go to their draw section.

== Draw ==
Key

- Q = Qualifier
- WC = Wild card
- LL = Lucky loser
- Alt = Alternate
- ITF = ITF entry
- PR = Protected ranking
- SR = Special ranking
- SE = Special exempt
- JE = Junior exempt
- JR = Junior Accelerator Programme entrant
- CO = College Accelerator Programme entrant
- NG = Next Gen Accelerator Program entrant
- w/o = Walkover
- r = Retired
- d = Defaulted

=== Finals ===
Quarterfinals
20	(Spain) Pablo Carreño Busta	3	7^{7}	7^{7}	0	6
12	(Canada) Denis Shapovalov	6	6^{5}	6^{4}	6	3
27	(Croatia) Borna Ćorić	6	6^{5}	6^{1}	3
5	(Germany) Alexander Zverev	1	7^{7}	7^{7}	6
10	(Russia) Andrey Rublev	6^{6}	3	6^{5}
3	(Russia) Daniil Medvedev	7^{8}	6	7^{7}
21	(Australia) Alex de Minaur	1	2	4
2	(Austria) Dominic Thiem	6	6	6

Semifinals
20	(Spain) Pablo Carreño Busta	6	6	3	4	3
5	(Germany) Alexander Zverev	3	2	6	6	6
3	(Russia) Daniil Medvedev	2	6^{7}	6^{5}
2	(Austria) Dominic Thiem	6	7^{9}	7^{7}

Final
5	(Germany) Alexander Zverev	6	6	4	3	6^{6}
2	(Austria) Dominic Thiem	2	4	6	6	7^{8}

=== Top half ===
==== Section 1 ====
First round
1	(Serbia) N Djokovic	6	6	6
(Bosnia and Herzegovina) D Džumhur	1	4	1
(United Kingdom) K Edmund	2	7	7	6
(Kazakhstan) A Bublik	6	5	5	0
(Portugal) J Sousa	2	5	6	1
WC	(United States) M Mmoh	6	7	2	6
(Spain) P Martínez	0	5	4
28	(Germany) J-L Struff	6	7	6
20	(Spain) P Carreño Busta	4	6	1	6	6
(Japan) Y Uchiyama	6	3	6	3	3
WC	(United States) M Krueger	3	6	7	6
(Portugal) P Sousa	6	2	5	3
(Italy) F Gaio	6^{3}	6	4	4
(Lithuania) R Berankis	7^{7}	4	6	6
(United States) S Johnson	6^{5}	6	6^{5}	6	7^{7}
16	(United States) J Isner	7^{7}	3	7^{7}	3	6^{3}

Second round
1	(Serbia) N Djokovic	6^{5}	6	6	6
(United Kingdom) K Edmund	7^{7}	3	4	2
WC	(United States) M Mmoh	2	2	5
28	(Germany) J-L Struff	6	6	7
20	(Spain) P Carreño Busta	6	6	6
WC	(United States) M Krueger	1	2	2
(Lithuania) R Berankis	7	6	1	7^{7}
(United States) S Johnson	5	2	6	6^{1}

Third round
1	(Serbia) N Djokovic	6	6	6
28	(Germany) J-L Struff	3	3	1
20	(Spain) P Carreño Busta	6	6	6
(Lithuania) R Berankis	4	3	2

Fourth round
1	(Serbia) N Djokovic	5^{d}
20	(Spain) P Carreño Busta	6

==== Section 2 ====
First round
12	(Canada) D Shapovalov	6	4	6	6
WC	(United States) S Korda	4	6	3	2
WC	(United States) T-S Kwiatkowski	6	6^{4}	1	2
(South Korea) S-w Kwon	3	7^{7}	6	6
(Egypt) M Safwat	1	4	4
(France) G Simon	6	6	6
(Germany) D Koepfer	7^{9}	3	2	4
19	(United States) T Fritz	6^{7}	6	6	6
26	(Serbia) F Krajinović	6	7^{7}	6
(Sweden) M Ymer	2	6^{3}	3
(United States) M Giron	6	6^{5}	3	6	6
(Australia) M Polmans	4	7^{7}	6	4	2
(South Africa) L Harris	6	7	6
(Italy) M Cecchinato	4	5	2
(United States) R Opelka	6^{2}	6	1	4
7	(Belgium) D Goffin	7^{7}	3	6	6

Second round
12	(Canada) D Shapovalov	6^{5}	6	6	6
(South Korea) S-w Kwon	7^{7}	4	4	2
(France) G Simon	5	3	2
19	(United States) T Fritz	7	6	6
26	(Serbia) F Krajinović	6	6	6
(United States) M Giron	4	1	3
(South Africa) L Harris	6^{6}	6	1	4
7	(Belgium) D Goffin	7^{8}	4	6	6

Third round
12	(Canada) D Shapovalov	3	6	4	7^{7}	6
19	(United States) T Fritz	6	3	6	6^{5}	2
26	(Serbia) F Krajinović	1	6^{5}	4
7	(Belgium) D Goffin	6	7^{7}	6

Fourth round
12	(Canada) D Shapovalov	6^{0}	6	6	6
7	(Belgium) D Goffin	7^{7}	3	4	3

==== Section 3 ====
First round
4	(Greece) S Tsitsipas	6	6	6
(Spain) A Ramos Viñolas	2	1	1
WC	(United States) M Cressy	6	2	6	6
(Slovakia) J Kovalík	1	6	4	4
(Argentina) JI Londero	6	6	7
(Russia) E Donskoy	3	3	5
(Spain) P Andújar	5	3	1
27	(Croatia) B Ćorić	7	6	6
18	(Serbia) D Lajović	1	6	4	4
(Belarus) E Gerasimov	6	4	6	6
(Italy) S Travaglia	3	4	6	2
(Australia) J Thompson	6	6	4	6
(Hungary) A Balázs	4	5	4
(Kazakhstan) M Kukushkin	6	7	6
WC	(United States) U Blanch	6	7	4	4	2
13	(Chile) C Garín	4	5	6	6	6

Second round
4	(Greece) S Tsitsipas	7^{7}	6	6
WC	(United States) M Cressy	6^{2}	3	4
(Argentina) JI Londero	5	6	7^{7}	2	3
27	(Croatia) B Ćorić	7	4	6^{5}	6	6
(Belarus) E Gerasimov	1	4	6	3
(Australia) J Thompson	6	6	3	6
(Kazakhstan) M Kukushkin	6	6	3	4	7
13	(Chile) C Garín	2	1	6	6	5

Third round
4	(Greece) S Tsitsipas	7^{7}	4	6	5	6^{4}
27	(Croatia) B Ćorić	6^{2}	6	4	7	7^{7}
(Australia) J Thompson	7	6	6
(Kazakhstan) M Kukushkin	5	4	1

Fourth round
27	(Croatia) B Ćorić	7	6	6
(Australia) J Thompson	5	1	3

==== Section 4 ====
First round
9	(Argentina) D Schwartzman	6	6	2	1	5
(United Kingdom) C Norrie	3	4	6	6	7
(Chinese Taipei) J Jung	6	6	4	1	0^{r}
(Argentina) F Coria	2	4	6	6	2
(Spain) A Davidovich Fokina	3	6	6	1	6
(Austria) D Novak	6	4	3	6	0
(Germany) P Gojowczyk	3	4	4
24	(Poland) H Hurkacz	6	6	6
32	(France) A Mannarino	6	6	2	6
(Italy) L Sonego	1	4	6	3
PR	(United States) J Sock	3	6	6	4	7^{7}
(Uruguay) P Cuevas	6	4	2	6	6^{2}
(Italy) P Lorenzi	3	2	6^{3}
WC	(United States) B Nakashima	6	6	7^{7}
(South Africa) K Anderson	6^{2}	7	3	5
5	(Germany) A Zverev	7^{7}	5	6	7

Second round
(United Kingdom) C Norrie	6	6	6
(Argentina) F Coria	3	4	4
(Spain) A Davidovich Fokina	6	1	6	6
24	(Poland) H Hurkacz	4	6	2	2
32	(France) A Mannarino	7^{7}	7	6
PR	(United States) J Sock	6^{5}	5	2
WC	(United States) B Nakashima	5	7^{10}	3	1
5	(Germany) A Zverev	7	6^{8}	6	6

Third round
(United Kingdom) C Norrie	6^{2}	6	2	1
(Spain) A Davidovich Fokina	7^{7}	4	6	6
32	(France) A Mannarino	7^{7}	4	2	2
5	(Germany) A Zverev	6^{4}	6	6	6

Fourth round
(Spain) A Davidovich Fokina	2	2	1
5	(Germany) A Zverev	6	6	6

=== Bottom half ===
==== Section 5 ====
First round
6	(Italy) M Berrettini	7^{7}	6	6
(Japan) G Soeda	6^{5}	1	4
(Japan) Y Sugita	3	4	3
(France) U Humbert	6	6	6
(Finland) E Ruusuvuori	6	3	6	4	6
(Slovenia) A Bedene	3	6	1	6	1
PR	(United States) M McDonald	6	6	4	3	2
30	(Norway) C Ruud	4	4	6	6	6
Alt	(United States) E Escobedo	7^{7}	6	6
(Poland) K Majchrzak	6^{3}	2	3
(Italy) S Caruso	4	7	7	6
(Australia) J Duckworth	6	5	5	2
(Japan) T Daniel	3	4	6	1
(France) G Barrère	6	6	3	6
(France) J Chardy	4	4	3
10	(Russia) A Rublev	6	6	6

Second round
6	(Italy) M Berrettini	6	6	7^{8}
(France) U Humbert	4	4	6^{6}
(Finland) E Ruusuvuori	4	3	2^{r}
30	(Norway) C Ruud	6	6	3
Alt	(United States) E Escobedo	6	4	3	4
(Italy) S Caruso	3	6	6	6
(France) G Barrère	2	4	6^{4}
10	(Russia) A Rublev	6	6	7^{7}

Third round
6	(Italy) M Berrettini	6	6	6
30	(Norway) C Ruud	4	4	2
(Italy) S Caruso	0	4	0
10	(Russia) A Rublev	6	6	6

Fourth round
6	(Italy) M Berrettini	6	3	3	3
10	(Russia) A Rublev	4	6	6	6

==== Section 6 ====
First round
14	(Bulgaria) G Dimitrov	6	6	6
(United States) T Paul	4	3	1
(Hungary) M Fucsovics	6	6	6
(Bolivia) H Dellien	3	3	1
(United States) F Tiafoe	4	6	6	7
(Italy) A Seppi	6	3	4	5
(Australia) J Millman	6	6	6
22	(Georgia (country)) N Basilashvili	1	4	4
29	(Argentina) G Pella	2	6	3	3
WC	(United States) JJ Wolf	6	0	6	6
(Spain) F López	6	6^{5}	4	3
(Spain) R Carballés Baena	3	7^{7}	6	6
(Australia) C O'Connell	4	6	7^{7}	6
(Serbia) L Đere	6	4	6^{2}	4
(Argentina) F Delbonis	1	2	4
3	(Russia) D Medvedev	6	6	6

Second round
14	(Bulgaria) G Dimitrov	7^{7}	6^{4}	6	4	1
(Hungary) M Fucsovics	6^{5}	7^{7}	3	6	6
(United States) F Tiafoe	7^{8}	3	1	6	6
(Australia) J Millman	6^{6}	6	6	3	3
WC	(United States) JJ Wolf	6	6	6
(Spain) R Carballés Baena	2	4	3
(Australia) C O'Connell	3	2	4
3	(Russia) D Medvedev	6	6	6

Third round
(Hungary) M Fucsovics	2	3	2
(United States) F Tiafoe	6	6	6
WC	(United States) JJ Wolf	3	3	2
3	(Russia) D Medvedev	6	6	6

Fourth round
(United States) F Tiafoe	4	1	0
3	(Russia) D Medvedev	6	6	6

==== Section 7 ====
First round
8	(Spain) R Bautista Agut	6	6	7^{7}
(United States) T Sandgren	4	4	6^{3}
(Italy) G Mager	4	4	7^{8}	6	2
(Serbia) M Kecmanović	6	6	6^{6}	3	6
(Canada) V Pospisil	7^{7}	7	7^{7}
(Germany) P Kohlschreiber	6^{4}	5	6^{3}
(Argentina) L Mayer	3	2	3
25	(Canada) M Raonic	6	6	6
21	(Australia) A de Minaur	6	6	7
(Slovakia) A Martin	4	3	5
(Croatia) I Karlović	6^{0}	6^{4}	1
(France) R Gasquet	7^{7}	7^{7}	6
PR	(Russia) A Kuznetsov	6	7^{8}	6
(United States) S Querrey	4	6^{6}	2
(Italy) J Sinner	6	7^{9}	2	0	6^{4}
11	(Russia) K Khachanov	3	6^{7}	6	6	7^{7}

Second round
8	(Spain) R Bautista Agut	6	3	6	6
(Serbia) M Kecmanović	3	6	3	4
(Canada) V Pospisil	6^{1}	6	7^{7}	6
25	(Canada) M Raonic	7^{7}	3	6^{4}	3
21	(Australia) A de Minaur	6	6	6^{6}	7
(France) R Gasquet	4	3	7^{8}	5
PR	(Russia) A Kuznetsov	3	4	1
11	(Russia) K Khachanov	6	6	6

Third round
8	(Spain) R Bautista Agut	5	6	6	3	2
(Canada) V Pospisil	7	2	4	6	6
21	(Australia) A de Minaur	6	0	4	6	6
11	(Russia) K Khachanov	4	6	6	3	1

Fourth round
(Canada) V Pospisil	6^{6}	3	2
21	(Australia) A de Minaur	7^{8}	6	6

==== Section 8 ====
First round
15	(Canada) F Auger-Aliassime	6	6^{7}	7^{8}	7^{8}
(Brazil) T Monteiro	3	7^{9}	6^{6}	6^{6}
(United Kingdom) A Murray	4	4	7^{7}	7^{7}	6
(Japan) Y Nishioka	6	6	6^{5}	6^{4}	4
(France) C Moutet	6	6	7
(Czech Republic) J Veselý	4	4	5
(Brazil) T Seyboth Wild	2	1	6^{5}
23	(United Kingdom) D Evans	6	6	7^{7}
31	(Croatia) M Čilić	6^{3}	3	7	7	6
(United States) D Kudla	7^{7}	6	5	5	3
(Slovakia) N Gombos	6	6	6
(Moldova) R Albot	4	1	4
(India) S Nagal	6	6	3	6
(United States) B Klahn	1	3	6	1
(Spain) J Munar	6^{6}	3	0^{r}
2	(Austria) D Thiem	7^{8}	6	0

Second round
15	(Canada) F Auger-Aliassime	6	6	6
(United Kingdom) A Murray	2	3	4
(France) C Moutet	4	6	7^{7}	7^{7}
23	(United Kingdom) D Evans	6	3	6^{5}	6^{1}
31	(Croatia) M Čilić	6	1	7^{7}	7
(Slovakia) N Gombos	3	6	6^{2}	5
(India) S Nagal	3	3	2
2	(Austria) D Thiem	6	6	6

Third round
15	(Canada) F Auger-Aliassime	6	6	6
(France) C Moutet	1	0	4
31	(Croatia) M Čilić	2	2	6	3
2	(Austria) D Thiem	6	6	3	6

Fourth round
15	(Canada) F Auger-Aliassime	6^{4}	1	1
2	(Austria) D Thiem	7^{7}	6	6

== Players ==
=== Seeded players ===
Seed	Rank	Player	Points before	Points defending	Points won	Points after	Status
1	1	(Serbia) Novak Djokovic	10,860	180	0	10,860	Fourth round, defaulted against (Spain) Pablo Carreño Busta [20]
2	3	(Austria) Dominic Thiem	7,135	10	2,000	9,125	Champion, defeated (Germany) Alexander Zverev [5]
3	5	(Russia) Daniil Medvedev	5,890	1,200	720	5,890	Semifinals, lost to (Austria) Dominic Thiem [2]
4	6	(Greece) Stefanos Tsitsipas	5,095	10	90	5,175	Third round, lost to (Croatia) Borna Ćorić [27]
5	7	(Germany) Alexander Zverev	3,630	180	1,200	4,650	Final, lost to (Austria) Dominic Thiem [2]
6	8	(Italy) Matteo Berrettini	2,940	720	180	2,940	Fourth round, lost to (Russia) Andrey Rublev [10]
7	10	(Belgium) David Goffin	2,555	180	180	2,555	Fourth round, lost to (Canada) Denis Shapovalov [12]
8	11	(Spain) Roberto Bautista Agut	2,540	10	90	2,620	Third round, lost to (Canada) Vasek Pospisil
9	13	(Argentina) Diego Schwartzman	2,265	360	10	2,265	First round, lost to (United Kingdom) Cameron Norrie
10	14	(Russia) Andrey Rublev	2,234	180	360	2,414	Quarterfinals, lost to (Russia) Daniil Medvedev [3]
11	16	(Russia) Karen Khachanov	2,120	10	90	2,200	Third round, lost to (Australia) Alex de Minaur [21]
12	17	(Canada) Denis Shapovalov	2,075	90	360	2,345	Quarterfinals, lost to (Spain) Pablo Carreño Busta [20]
13	19	(Chile) Cristian Garín	1,900	45	45	1,900	Second round, lost to (Kazakhstan) Mikhail Kukushkin
14	20	(Bulgaria) Grigor Dimitrov	1,885	720	45	1,885	Second round, lost to (Hungary) Márton Fucsovics
15	21	(Canada) Félix Auger-Aliassime	1,806	10	180	1,976	Fourth round, lost to (Austria) Dominic Thiem [2]
16	22	(United States) John Isner	1,805	90	10	1,805	First round, lost to (United States) Steve Johnson
~~17~~	~~23~~	~~(France) Benoît Paire~~	1,738	45	0	1,738	Withdrew and tested positive for COVID-19
18	24	(Serbia) Dušan Lajović	1,695	45	10	1,695	First round, lost to (Belarus) Egor Gerasimov
19	25	(United States) Taylor Fritz	1,545	10	90	1,625	Third round, lost to (Canada) Denis Shapovalov [12]
20	27	(Spain) Pablo Carreño Busta	1,500	90	720	2,130	Semifinals, lost to (Germany) Alexander Zverev [5]
21	28	(Australia) Alex de Minaur	1,485	180	360	1,665	Quarterfinals, lost to (Austria) Dominic Thiem [2]
22	30	(Georgia (country)) Nikoloz Basilashvili	1,395	90	10	1,395	First round, lost to (Australia) John Millman
23	31	(United Kingdom) Dan Evans	1,384	90	45	1,384	Second round, lost to (France) Corentin Moutet
24	33	(Poland) Hubert Hurkacz	1,353	10	45	1,388	Second round, lost to (Spain) Alejandro Davidovich Fokina
25	18	(Canada) Milos Raonic	1,950	0	45	1,995	Second round, lost to (Canada) Vasek Pospisil
26	26	(Serbia) Filip Krajinović	1,503	10	90	1,583	Third round, lost to (Belgium) David Goffin [7]
27	32	(Croatia) Borna Ćorić	1,355	45	360	1,670	Quarterfinals, lost to (Germany) Alexander Zverev [5]
28	29	(Germany) Jan-Lennard Struff	1,405	45	90	1,450	Third round, lost to (Serbia) Novak Djokovic [1]
29	36	(Argentina) Guido Pella	1,310	10	10	1,310	First round, lost to (United States) J. J. Wolf [WC]
30	37	(Norway) Casper Ruud	1,279	10	90	1,359	Third round, lost to (Italy) Matteo Berrettini [6]
31	38	(Croatia) Marin Čilić	1,225	180	90	1,225	Third round, lost to (Austria) Dominic Thiem [2]
32	39	(France) Adrian Mannarino	1,191	10	90	1,271	Third round, lost to (Germany) Alexander Zverev [5]

== Other entry information ==
=== Wild cards ===
- (United States) Ulises Blanch
- (United States) Maxime Cressy
- (United States) Sebastian Korda
- (United States) Mitchell Krueger
- (United States) Thai-Son Kwiatkowski
- (United States) Michael Mmoh
- (United States) Brandon Nakashima
- (United States) J. J. Wolf

=== Protected ranking ===
- (Russia) Andrey Kuznetsov (130)
- (United States) Mackenzie McDonald (83)
- (United States) Jack Sock (119)

=== Alternates ===
- (United States) Ernesto Escobedo
- ~~(Spain) Marcel Granollers~~ (withdrew due to focus on doubles)

=== Withdrawals ===
- † (Spain) Rafael Nadal (2) → replaced by (Australia) Marc Polmans (119)
- † (Switzerland) Roger Federer (4) → replaced by (United States) Jack Sock (119 PR)
- † (France) Gaël Monfils (9) → replaced by (Chinese Taipei) Jason Jung (120)
- † (Italy) Fabio Fognini (11) → replaced by (Italy) Paolo Lorenzi (121)
- † (Switzerland) Stan Wawrinka (17) → replaced by (Slovakia) Jozef Kovalík (122)
- † (Australia) Nick Kyrgios (40) → replaced by (South Africa) Kevin Anderson (123)
- † (France) Jo-Wilfried Tsonga (49) → replaced by (Croatia) Ivo Karlović (124)
- † (France) Lucas Pouille (58) → replaced by (Germany) Peter Gojowczyk (125)
- † (France) Pierre-Hugues Herbert (71) → replaced by (United States) Bradley Klahn (126)
- † (Chile) Nicolás Jarry (89) → replaced by (India) Sumit Nagal (127)
- & (Australia) Alexei Popyrin (95) → replaced by (United Kingdom) Andy Murray (129)
- & (Chinese Taipei) Lu Yen-hsun (71 PR) → replaced by (Italy) Federico Gaio (130)
- & (Japan) Kei Nishikori (31) → replaced by (Russia) Andrey Kuznetsov (130 PR)
- & (Spain) Fernando Verdasco (52) → replaced by (Egypt) Mohamed Safwat (131) (Note: Last direct acceptance)
- & (France) Benoît Paire (22) → replaced by (United States) Ernesto Escobedo (Alt) (Note: Marcel Granollers had initially replaced Paire, but later withdrew due to focus on his Men's Doubles match.)

† – not included on entry list
& – withdrew from entry list
Rank date: March 16, 2020 (Note: Valid on using the August 3, 2020 entry date)

== Notes ==
Preceded by 2020 Australian Open – Men's singles	Grand Slam men's singles	Succeeded by 2020 French Open – Men's singles
