= 2024 Erste Bank Open – Doubles =

Doubles
- 2024 Erste Bank Open

Final
- Champions: (Austria) Alexander Erler (Austria) Lucas Miedler
- Runners-up: (United Kingdom) Neal Skupski (New Zealand) Michael Venus
- Score: 4–6, 6–3, [10–1]

Details
- Draw: 16
- Seeds: 4

Events
Singles	Doubles
- Erste Bank Open

Alexander Erler and Lucas Miedler defeated Neal Skupski and Michael Venus in the final, 4–6, 6–3, [10–1] to win the doubles tennis title at the 2024 Vienna Open. It was Erler and Miedler's second title in Vienna, after 2022.

Rajeev Ram and Joe Salisbury were the reigning champions, but chose to compete in Basel instead with different partners.

== Seeds ==
1. (El Salvador) Marcelo Arévalo / (Croatia) Mate Pavić (first round)
2. (India) Rohan Bopanna / (Australia) Matthew Ebden (quarterfinals)
3. (Finland) Harri Heliövaara / (United Kingdom) Henry Patten (semifinals)
4. (United States) Nathaniel Lammons / (United States) Jackson Withrow (quarterfinals)

== Draw ==
Key

- Q = Qualifier
- WC = Wild card
- LL = Lucky loser
- Alt = Alternate
- ITF = ITF entry
- PR = Protected ranking
- SR = Special ranking
- SE = Special exempt
- JE = Junior exempt
- JR = Junior Accelerator Programme entrant
- CO = College Accelerator Programme entrant
- NG = Next Gen Accelerator Program entrant
- w/o = Walkover
- r = Retired
- d = Defaulted

=== Draw ===
First round
1	(El Salvador) M Arévalo (Croatia) M Pavić	3	4
(Italy) L Darderi (Argentina) M Navone	6	6
(Czech Republic) T Macháč (China) Z Zhang	6^{2}	6	[8]
WC	(Austria) A Erler (Austria) L Miedler	7^{7}	4	[10]
3	(Finland) H Heliövaara (United Kingdom) H Patten	7^{7}	6
(France) S Doumbia (France) F Reboul	6^{5}	3
(Uruguay) A Behar (United States) R Galloway	6^{5}	2
Q	(Slovakia) L Klein (Slovakia) J Kovalík	7^{7}	6
(United Kingdom) J Cash (United Kingdom) L Glasspool	6^{3}	6^{3}
(Argentina) M González (Argentina) A Molteni	7^{7}	7^{7}
(Belgium) S Gillé (Belgium) J Vliegen	2	6	[9]
4	(United States) N Lammons (United States) J Withrow	6	4	[11]
(Brazil) R Matos (Brazil) M Melo	2	3
(United Kingdom) N Skupski (New Zealand) M Venus	6	6
WC	(Netherlands) R Haase (Germany) A Zverev	6	5	[5]
2	(India) R Bopanna (Australia) M Ebden	2	7	[10]

Quarterfinals
(Italy) L Darderi (Argentina) M Navone	3	3
WC	(Austria) A Erler (Austria) L Miedler	6	6
3	(Finland) H Heliövaara (United Kingdom) H Patten	6	6
Q	(Slovakia) L Klein (Slovakia) J Kovalík	1	4
(Argentina) M González (Argentina) A Molteni	6^{5}	7^{7}	[10]
4	(United States) N Lammons (United States) J Withrow	7^{7}	6^{5}	[8]
(United Kingdom) N Skupski (New Zealand) M Venus	6^{7}	6	[10]
2	(India) R Bopanna (Australia) M Ebden	7^{9}	4	[8]

Semifinals
WC	(Austria) A Erler (Austria) L Miedler	1	7	[13]
3	(Finland) H Heliövaara (United Kingdom) H Patten	6	5	[11]
(Argentina) M González (Argentina) A Molteni	6^{7}	4
(United Kingdom) N Skupski (New Zealand) M Venus	7^{9}	6

Final
WC	(Austria) A Erler (Austria) L Miedler	4	6	[10]
(United Kingdom) N Skupski (New Zealand) M Venus	6	3	[1]

== Qualifying ==
=== Seeds ===
1. (Germany) Andreas Mies / (Australia) John-Patrick Smith (qualifying competition)
2. (Netherlands) Sander Arends / (United Kingdom) Luke Johnson (first round)

=== Qualifiers ===
1. (Slovakia) Lukáš Klein / (Slovakia) Jozef Kovalík

=== Qualifying draw ===
First round
1	(Germany) Andreas Mies (Australia) John-Patrick Smith	7^{7}	6
(Ecuador) Gonzalo Escobar (Ecuador) Diego Hidalgo	6^{3}	3
WC	(Slovakia) Lukáš Klein (Slovakia) Jozef Kovalík	6	7^{7}
2	(Netherlands) Sander Arends (United Kingdom) Luke Johnson	4	6^{3}

Qualifying competition
1	(Germany) Andreas Mies (Australia) John-Patrick Smith	3	4
WC	(Slovakia) Lukáš Klein (Slovakia) Jozef Kovalík	6	6
