= 2025 Erste Bank Open =

Men's tennis tournament in Austria

- Date: 20–26 October
- Edition: 51st
- Category: ATP 500 tournaments
- Draw: 32S / 16D
- Surface: Hard (indoor)
- Location: Vienna, Austria
- Venue: Wiener Stadthalle

Champions

Singles
- (Italy) Jannik Sinner

Doubles
- (United Kingdom) Julian Cash / (United Kingdom) Lloyd Glasspool
- Vienna Open

The 2025 Erste Bank Open was a men's tennis tournament played on indoor hard courts. It was the 51st edition of the event, and part of the ATP 500 tournaments of the 2025 ATP Tour. It was held at the Wiener Stadthalle in Vienna, Austria, from 20 until 26 October 2025.

== Champions ==
=== Singles ===
- (Italy) Jannik Sinner def. (Germany) Alexander Zverev, 3–6, 6–3, 7–5

=== Doubles ===
- (United Kingdom) Julian Cash / (United Kingdom) Lloyd Glasspool def. (Portugal) Francisco Cabral / (Austria) Lucas Miedler, 6–1, 7–6^{(8–6)}

== Singles main-draw entrants ==
=== Seeds ===
Country	Player	Rank^{1}	Seed
ITA	Jannik Sinner	2	1
GER	Alexander Zverev	3	2
AUS	Alex de Minaur	7	3
ITA	Lorenzo Musetti	8	4
	Karen Khachanov	10	5
	Daniil Medvedev	14	6
	Andrey Rublev	15	7
KAZ	Alexander Bublik	16	8

- ^{1} Rankings as of 13 October 2025

=== Other entrants ===
The following players received wildcards into the singles main draw:

- (Norway) Nicolai Budkov Kjær
- (Austria) Filip Misolic
- (Austria) Jurij Rodionov

The following players received entry from the qualifying draw:

- (Italy) Matteo Arnaldi
- (Bosnia and Herzegovina) Damir Džumhur
- (United Kingdom) Jacob Fearnley
- (United States) Aleksandar Kovacevic

The following player received entry as a lucky loser:

- (Serbia) Hamad Medjedovic

=== Withdrawals ===
- (Bulgaria) Grigor Dimitrov → replaced by (Portugal) Nuno Borges
- (United States) Tommy Paul → replaced by (Germany) Daniel Altmaier
- (United States) Frances Tiafoe → replaced by (Argentina) Camilo Ugo Carabelli
- (Greece) Stefanos Tsitsipas → replaced by (Serbia) Hamad Medjedovic

== Doubles main draw entrants ==
=== Seeds ===
Country	Player	Country	Player	Rank^{1}	Seed
ESA	Marcelo Arévalo	CRO	Mate Pavić	4	1
GBR	Julian Cash	GBR	Lloyd Glasspool	5	2
FIN	Harri Heliövaara	GBR	Henry Patten	10	3
GBR	Joe Salisbury	GBR	Neal Skupski	21	4

- ^{1} Rankings as of 13 October 2025

=== Other entrants ===
The following pairs received wildcards into the doubles main draw:

- (Austria) Alexander Erler / (United States) Robert Galloway
- (Austria) Neil Oberleitner / (Austria) Joel Schwärzler

The following pair received entry from the qualifying draw:

- (Germany) Constantin Frantzen / (Netherlands) Robin Haase

The following pairs received entry as lucky losers:

- (Uruguay) Ariel Behar / (Belgium) Joran Vliegen
- (Brazil) Fernando Romboli / (Australia) John-Patrick Smith

=== Withdrawals ===
- (Italy) Flavio Cobolli / (France) Corentin Moutet → replaced by (Uruguay) Ariel Behar / (Belgium) Joran Vliegen
- (United States) Alex Michelsen / (Australia) John Peers → replaced by (Brazil) Fernando Romboli / (Australia) John-Patrick Smith
