= 2025 Upper Austria Ladies Linz =

- Date: 27 January – 2 February
- Edition: 34th
- Category: WTA 500
- Draw: 28S / 16D
- Surface: Hard (Indoor) - (DecoTurf on Wood)
- Location: Linz, Austria
- Venue: Design Center Linz

Champions

Singles
- Ekaterina Alexandrova

Doubles
- (Hungary) Tímea Babos / (Brazil) Luisa Stefani
← 2024 ·	Linz Open	· 2026 →

The 2025 Upper Austria Ladies Linz was a professional women's tennis tournament played on indoor hard courts. It was the 34th edition of the tournament, and part of the WTA 500 tournaments of the 2025 WTA Tour. It was held at the Design Center Linz in Linz, Austria, from 27 January to 2 February 2025.

== Champions ==
=== Singles ===
- Ekaterina Alexandrova def. (Ukraine) Dayana Yastremska, 6–2, 3–6, 7–5

=== Doubles ===
- (Hungary) Tímea Babos / (Brazil) Luisa Stefani def. (Ukraine) Lyudmyla Kichenok / (Ukraine) Nadiia Kichenok, 3–6, 7–5, [10–4]

== Singles entrants ==
=== Seeds ===
Country	Player	Rank^{1}	Seed
CZE	Karolína Muchová	20	1
UKR	Elina Svitolina	27	2
GRE	Maria Sakkari	30	3
	Ekaterina Alexandrova	31	4
UKR	Dayana Yastremska	33	5
	Anastasia Potapova	36	6
ARM	Elina Avanesyan	41	7
DEN	Clara Tauson	42	8

- Rankings as of 13 January 2025

=== Other entrants ===
The following players received wildcards into the singles main draw:

- (Austria) Julia Grabher
- (Germany) Eva Lys
- (Czech Republic) Karolína Muchová

The following players received entry from the qualifying draw:

- (Austria) Sinja Kraus
- (Croatia) Petra Martić
- (Croatia) Antonia Ružić
- Aliaksandra Sasnovich
- (Spain) Sara Sorribes Tormo
- Anastasia Zakharova

=== Withdrawals ===
- (Switzerland) Belinda Bencic → replaced by (Ukraine) Anhelina Kalinina
- (Serbia) Olga Danilović → replaced by (Romania) Sorana Cîrstea
- (United States) Peyton Stearns → replaced by (Egypt) Mayar Sherif
- (Czech Republic) Markéta Vondroušová → replaced by (Italy) Lucia Bronzetti

== Doubles entrants ==
=== Seeds ===
Country	Player	Country	Player	Rank^{1}	Seed
CZE	Kateřina Siniaková	CHN	Zhang Shuai	27	1
KAZ	Anna Danilina		Irina Khromacheva	40	2
UKR	Lyudmyla Kichenok	UKR	Nadiia Kichenok	53	3
HUN	Tímea Babos	BRA	Luisa Stefani	80	4

- ^{1} Rankings as of 13 January 2025

=== Other entrants ===
The following pair received a wildcard into the doubles main draw:

- (Austria) Julia Grabher / (Austria) Sinja Kraus
