= 2024 Upper Austria Ladies Linz =

- Date: 29 January – 4 February
- Edition: 33rd
- Category: WTA 500
- Draw: 28S / 16D
- Prize money: $922,573
- Surface: Hard (indoor)
- Location: Linz, Austria
- Venue: Design Center Linz

Champions

Singles
- (Latvia) Jeļena Ostapenko

Doubles
- (Italy) Sara Errani / (Italy) Jasmine Paolini
- Linz Open

The 2024 Upper Austria Ladies Linz was a professional women's tennis tournament played on indoor hard courts. It was the 33rd edition of the tournament, and part of the WTA 500 tournaments of the 2024 WTA Tour. It was held at the Design Center Linz in Linz, Austria, from 29 January to 4 February 2024. The tournament was upgraded to WTA 500 level for the first time since 2008 when it was last held as a WTA Premier tournament.

== Finals ==
=== Singles ===
- (Latvia) Jeļena Ostapenko defeated Ekaterina Alexandrova, 6–2, 6–3

=== Doubles ===
- (Italy) Sara Errani / (Italy) Jasmine Paolini defeated (United States) Nicole Melichar-Martinez / (Australia) Ellen Perez 7–5, 4–6, [10–7]

== Points and prize money ==
=== Point distribution ===
Event	W	F	SF	QF	Round of 16	Round of 32	Q	Q2	Q1
Singles	500	325	195	108	60	1	25	13	1
Doubles	500	325	195	108	1	—N/a	—N/a	—N/a	—N/a

=== Prize money ===
Event	W	F	SF	QF	Round of 16	Round of 32^{1}	Q2	Q1
Singles	$142,000	$87,655	$51,205	$24,200	$13,170	$8,860	$6,603	$3,380
Doubles *	$47,390	$28,720	$16,430	$8,510	$5,140	—N/a	—N/a	—N/a

_{^{1} Qualifiers prize money is also the Round of 32 prize money}
_{* per team}

== Singles entrants ==
=== Seeds ===
Country	Player	Rank^{1}	Seed
LAT	Jeļena Ostapenko	10	1
	Ekaterina Alexandrova	20	2
CRO	Donna Vekić	25	3
BEL	Elise Mertens	28	4
	Anastasia Potapova	29	5
ITA	Jasmine Paolini	31	6
FRA	Varvara Gracheva	39	7
CRO	Petra Martić	40	8

- Rankings as of 15 January 2024

=== Other entrants ===
The following players received wildcards into the singles main draw:

- (Germany) Angelique Kerber
- (Austria) Sinja Kraus
- (Latvia) Jeļena Ostapenko
- (Ukraine) Dayana Yastremska

The following players received entry from the qualifying draw:

- Erika Andreeva
- (United Kingdom) Jodie Burrage
- (Italy) Sara Errani
- (Germany) Jule Niemeier
- (Italy) Lucrezia Stefanini
- (Denmark) Clara Tauson

The following player received entry as a lucky loser:

- (Romania) Jaqueline Cristian

=== Withdrawals ===
- (Ukraine) Anhelina Kalinina → replaced by (Romania) Jaqueline Cristian
- (Ukraine) Elina Svitolina → replaced by (Argentina) Nadia Podoroska
- (Czech Republic) Markéta Vondroušová → replaced by (United Kingdom) Katie Boulter

== Doubles entrants ==
=== Seeds ===
Country	Player	Country	Player	Rank^{1}	Seed
USA	Nicole Melichar-Martinez	AUS	Ellen Perez	32	1
NOR	Ulrikke Eikeri	SVK	Tereza Mihalíková	89	2
JPN	Eri Hozumi	JPN	Makoto Ninomiya	97	3
USA	Asia Muhammad	USA	Alycia Parks	103	4

- ^{1} Rankings as of January 15, 2024

=== Other entrants ===
The following pair received a wildcard into the doubles main draw:

- (Austria) Melanie Klaffner / (Austria) Sinja Kraus

The following pair received entry as alternates:

- Amina Anshba / (Czech Republic) Anastasia Dețiuc

=== Withdrawals ===
- (United Kingdom) Jodie Burrage / (Belgium) Greet Minnen → replaced by Amina Anshba / (Czech Republic) Anastasia Dețiuc
