= 2024 Upper Austria Ladies Linz – Singles =

Singles
- 2024 Upper Austria Ladies Linz

Final
- Champion: (Latvia) Jeļena Ostapenko
- Runner-up: Ekaterina Alexandrova
- Score: 6–2, 6–3

Details
- Draw: 28 (4 WC, 6 Q)
- Seeds: 8

Events
Singles	Doubles
← 2023 ·	Linz Open	· 2025 →

Jeļena Ostapenko defeated Ekaterina Alexandrova in the final, 6–2, 6–3 to win the singles tennis title at the 2024 Linz Open. It was her eighth WTA singles title. She saved a match point in her second-round match against Clara Tauson.

Anastasia Potapova was the defending champion, but lost in the quarterfinals to Alexandrova.

== Seeds ==
The top four seeds received a bye into the second round.

1. (Latvia) Jeļena Ostapenko (champion)
2. Ekaterina Alexandrova (final)
3. (Croatia) Donna Vekić (semifinals)
4. (Belgium) Elise Mertens (quarterfinals)
5. Anastasia Potapova (quarterfinals)
6. (Italy) Jasmine Paolini (first round)
7. (France) Varvara Gracheva (first round)
8. (Croatia) Petra Martić (first round)

== Draw ==
Key

- Q = Qualifier
- WC = Wild card
- LL = Lucky loser
- Alt = Alternate
- ITF = ITF entry
- PR = Protected ranking
- SR = Special ranking
- SE = Special exempt
- JE = Junior exempt
- JR = Junior Accelerator Programme entrant
- CO = College Accelerator Programme entrant
- NG = Next Gen Accelerator Program entrant
- w/o = Walkover
- r = Retired
- d = Defaulted

=== Finals ===
Semifinals
1/WC	(Latvia) Jeļena Ostapenko	6	6
Anastasia Pavlyuchenkova	2	3
3	(Croatia) Donna Vekić	7	6^{4}	6^{6}
2	Ekaterina Alexandrova	5	7^{7}	7^{8}

Final
1/WC	(Latvia) Jeļena Ostapenko	6	6
2	Ekaterina Alexandrova	2	3

=== Top half ===
First round
Q	(Denmark) C Tauson	3	6	6
(Italy) C Giorgi	6	3	3
LL	(Romania) J Cristian	6	6
(Argentina) N Podoroska	3	4
Q	(United Kingdom) J Burrage	6	6
7	(France) V Gracheva	4	0
WC	(Germany) A Kerber	1	3
(Italy) L Bronzetti	6	6
(Italy) M Trevisan	4	0
A Pavlyuchenkova	6	6
(United Kingdom) K Boulter	6	6
6	(Italy) J Paolini	2	2

Second round
1/WC	(Latvia) J Ostapenko	3	6	7^{9}
Q	(Denmark) C Tauson	6	4	6^{7}
LL	(Romania) J Cristian	3	6^{5}
Q	(United Kingdom) J Burrage	6	7^{7}
4	(Belgium) E Mertens	6	6
(Italy) L Bronzetti	1	3
A Pavlyuchenkova	7^{7}	6
(United Kingdom) K Boulter	6^{2}	4

Quarterfinals
1/WC	(Latvia) J Ostapenko	6	6
Q	(United Kingdom) J Burrage	1	2
4	(Belgium) E Mertens	3	2
A Pavlyuchenkova	6	6

Semifinals
1/WC	(Latvia) J Ostapenko	6	6
A Pavlyuchenkova	2	3

=== Bottom half ===
First round
8	(Croatia) P Martić	6	3	5
(Czech Republic) K Siniaková	4	6	7
(France) C Burel	6	6
WC	(Austria) S Kraus	1	4
WC	(Ukraine) D Yastremska	7^{7}	3	6
Q	E Andreeva	6^{4}	6	2
5	A Potapova	6	6
Q	(Italy) S Errani	4	3
Q	(Italy) L Stefanini	2	0
(Italy) E Cocciaretto	6	6
A Blinkova	3	4
Q	(Germany) J Niemeier	6	6

Second round
(Czech Republic) K Siniaková	3	7	4
(France) C Burel	6	5	6
WC	(Ukraine) D Yastremska	1	1
3	(Croatia) D Vekić	6	6
5	A Potapova	2	7^{11}	7
(Italy) E Cocciaretto	6	6^{9}	5
Q	(Germany) J Niemeier	3	0
2	E Alexandrova	6	6

Quarterfinals
(France) C Burel	0	6^{3}
3	(Croatia) D Vekić	6	7^{7}
5	A Potapova	2	6^{8}
2	E Alexandrova	6	7^{10}

Semifinals
3	(Croatia) D Vekić	7	6^{4}	6^{6}
2	E Alexandrova	5	7^{7}	7^{8}

== Qualifying ==
=== Seeds ===
1. (Belgium) Greet Minnen (first round)
2. (Poland) Magdalena Fręch (first round)
3. (Germany) Tamara Korpatsch (qualifying competition)
4. (United States) Alycia Parks (first round)
5. (Romania) Jaqueline Cristian (qualifying competition, lucky loser)
6. (Spain) Rebeka Masarova (first round)
7. (Denmark) Clara Tauson (qualified)
8. (Italy) Sara Errani (qualified)
9. (United Kingdom) Jodie Burrage (qualified)
10. (Spain) Marina Bassols Ribera (qualifying competition)
11. (United Kingdom) Harriet Dart (first round)
12. Erika Andreeva (qualified)

=== Qualifiers ===
1. (United Kingdom) Jodie Burrage
2. (Italy) Sara Errani
3. Erika Andreeva
4. (Italy) Lucrezia Stefanini
5. (Denmark) Clara Tauson
6. (Germany) Jule Niemeier

=== Lucky loser ===
1. (Romania) Jaqueline Cristian

=== Qualifying draw ===
==== First qualifier ====
First round
1	(Belgium) Greet Minnen	6	6^{4}	4
(Germany) Anna-Lena Friedsam	2	7^{7}	6
(Colombia) Emiliana Arango	1	4
9	(United Kingdom) Jodie Burrage	6	6

Qualifying competition
(Germany) Anna-Lena Friedsam	7	3	2
9	(United Kingdom) Jodie Burrage	5	6	6

==== Second qualifier ====
First round
2	(Poland) Magdalena Fręch	4	0
WC	(Germany) Ella Seidel	6	6
(Hungary) Anna Bondár	6	2	2
8	(Italy) Sara Errani	1	6	6

Qualifying competition
WC	(Germany) Ella Seidel	6^{5}	4
8	(Italy) Sara Errani	7^{7}	6

==== Third qualifier ====
First round
3	(Germany) Tamara Korpatsch	6	7^{7}
(Serbia) Olga Danilović	3	6^{2}
WC	(Austria) Arabella Koller	0	0
12	Erika Andreeva	6	6

Qualifying competition
3	(Germany) Tamara Korpatsch	7^{7}	2	1
12	Erika Andreeva	6^{5}	6	6

==== Fourth qualifier ====
First round
4	(United States) Alycia Parks	7	1	4
(Italy) Lucrezia Stefanini	5	6	6
(Switzerland) Jil Teichmann	4	3
10	(Spain) Marina Bassols Ribera	6	6

Qualifying competition
(Italy) Lucrezia Stefanini	6	6
10	(Spain) Marina Bassols Ribera	2	0

==== Fifth qualifier ====
First round
5	(Romania) Jaqueline Cristian	6	6
PR	(United States) Caty McNally	3	3
WC	(Austria) Tamara Kostic	2	2
7	(Denmark) Clara Tauson	6	6

Qualifying competition
5	(Romania) Jaqueline Cristian	2	0
7	(Denmark) Clara Tauson	6	6

==== Sixth qualifier ====
First round
6	(Spain) Rebeka Masarova	4	7	4
(Spain) Nuria Párrizas Díaz	6	5	6
WC	(Germany) Jule Niemeier	7^{9}	6
11	(United Kingdom) Harriet Dart	6^{7}	2

Qualifying competition
(Spain) Nuria Párrizas Díaz	3	1
WC	(Germany) Jule Niemeier	6	6
