= 2025 Upper Austria Ladies Linz – Doubles =

Doubles
- 2025 Upper Austria Ladies Linz

Final
- Champions: (Hungary) Tímea Babos (Brazil) Luisa Stefani
- Runners-up: (Ukraine) Lyudmyla Kichenok (Ukraine) Nadiia Kichenok
- Score: 3–6, 7–5, [10–4]

Details
- Draw: 16
- Seeds: 4

Events
Singles	Doubles
← 2024 ·	Linz Open	· 2026 →

Tímea Babos and Luisa Stefani won the doubles title at the 2025 Upper Austria Ladies Linz, defeating Lyudmyla and Nadiia Kichenok in the final, 3–6, 7–5, [10–4].

Sara Errani and Jasmine Paolini were the reigning champions, but chose not to defend their title.

== Seeds ==
1. (Czech Republic) Kateřina Siniaková / (China) Zhang Shuai (semifinals)
2. (Kazakhstan) Anna Danilina / Irina Khromacheva (semifinals)
3. (Ukraine) Lyudmyla Kichenok / (Ukraine) Nadiia Kichenok (final)
4. (Hungary) Tímea Babos / (Brazil) Luisa Stefani (champions)

== Draw ==
Key

- Q = Qualifier
- WC = Wild card
- LL = Lucky loser
- Alt = Alternate
- ITF = ITF entry
- PR = Protected ranking
- SR = Special ranking
- SE = Special exempt
- JE = Junior exempt
- JR = Junior Accelerator Programme entrant
- CO = College Accelerator Programme entrant
- NG = Next Gen Accelerator Program entrant
- w/o = Walkover
- r = Retired
- d = Defaulted

=== Draw ===
First round
1	(Czech Republic) K Siniaková (China) S Zhang	6	6
(United States) Q Gleason (Belgium) K Zimmermann	3	3
(Slovakia) R Šramková (Bulgaria) V Tomova	4	6^{6}
(United Kingdom) E Appleton (China) Q Tang	6	7^{8}
4	(Hungary) T Babos (Brazil) L Stefani	6	6
(Spain) Y Cavallé Reimers (Italy) A Moratelli	3	3
(Slovakia) T Mihalíková (United Kingdom) O Nicholls	7	6
(Japan) S Aoyama (Japan) E Hozumi	5	4
(Poland) K Piter (Hungary) F Stollár	6	6
WC	(Austria) J Grabher (Austria) S Kraus	1	2
(Norway) U Eikeri (Chinese Taipei) F-h Wu	3	4
3	(Ukraine) L Kichenok (Ukraine) N Kichenok	6	6
A Potapova; Y Sizikova	7	6
E Alexandrova (United States) S Santamaria	5	3
(Czech Republic) A Dețiuc (Czech Republic) M Škoch	4	4
2	(Kazakhstan) A Danilina; I Khromacheva	6	6

Quarterfinals
1	(Czech Republic) K Siniaková (China) S Zhang	7	6
(United Kingdom) E Appleton (China) Q Tang	5	2
4	(Hungary) T Babos (Brazil) L Stefani	6	2
(Slovakia) T Mihalíková (United Kingdom) O Nicholls	3	0^{r}
(Poland) K Piter (Hungary) F Stollár	3	2
3	(Ukraine) L Kichenok (Ukraine) N Kichenok	6	6
A Potapova; Y Sizikova	1	2
2	(Kazakhstan) A Danilina; I Khromacheva	6	6

Semifinals
1	(Czech Republic) K Siniaková (China) S Zhang	3	6	[7]
4	(Hungary) T Babos (Brazil) L Stefani	6	4	[10]
3	(Ukraine) L Kichenok (Ukraine) N Kichenok	6	6
2	(Kazakhstan) A Danilina; I Khromacheva	4	0

Final
4	(Hungary) T Babos (Brazil) L Stefani	3	7	[10]
3	(Ukraine) L Kichenok (Ukraine) N Kichenok	6	5	[4]
