= Sascha Bajin =

German tennis player and coach (born 1984)

- Full name: Aleksandar Bajin
- Country (sports): Germany
- Born: October 4, 1984 (age 42) Serbia, Yugoslavia
- Prize money: $2,054

Singles
- Highest ranking: 1149

Doubles
- Highest ranking: 1180

Coaching career (2017–)
- Naomi Osaka (2017–2019); Kristina Mladenovic (Apr-Oct 2019); Dayana Yastremska (2019–2020); Karolína Plíšková (2020–2022, 2023); Alycia Parks (Mar 2024); Donna Vekić (Dec 2024-Jun 2025); Diana Shnaider (Aug 2025-)

Coaching achievements
- Coachee singles titles total: 3
- List of notable tournaments (with champion) US Open (Osaka); Australian Open (Osaka)

Coaching awards and records
- Awards WTA Coach of the Year (2018)
- Last updated on: 9 December 2024.

Aleksandar "Sascha" Bajin (Serbian Cyrillic: Александар Бајин; born 4 October 1984) is a Serbian-born German tennis coach and former player.

== Biography ==
Bajin had a brief career on the Association of Tennis Professionals (ATP) Tour, reaching career high rankings of 1,149 in singles and 1,180 in doubles.

Bajin is best known as the former hitting partner of Serena Williams when she won 13 of her Grand Slam titles. Later on, he was a hitting partner for Victoria Azarenka, Sloane Stephens, and Caroline Wozniacki.

He coached Naomi Osaka to two Grand Slam titles, one at the 2018 US Open and one at the 2019 Australian Open. He won the inaugural WTA Coach of the Year award in 2018 for coaching Osaka to her first two titles, the US Open and the Indian Wells Open. Osaka split with Bajin shortly after her Australian Open title.

In April 2019, Bajin began working with Kristina Mladenovic. He split with Mladenovic in October 2019 and started coaching Dayana Yastremska. In September 2020 they split after Yastremska had a disappointing performance in the 2020 US Open.

From November 2020 to July 2022, Bajin coached Karolína Plíšková. She reached the 2021 Wimbledon Championships final under his tutelage. The two reunited in December 2022 for the 2023 season.

He briefly coached Alycia Parks in the beginning of 2024 during the Sunshine double.

In December 2024, Donna Vekić announced she had hired Bajin as her new coach replacing Nikola Horvat who had quit the previous month for family reasons.

In August 2025, Bajin began working Diana Shnaider ahead of the Cincinnati Open, following her split from her previous coaches Dinara Safina and Carlos Martinez. The collaboration immediately showed results, with Shnaider winning her first WTA title of 2025 in Monterrey, shortly after the partnership started.
