= 2024 Upper Austria Ladies Linz – Doubles =

Doubles
- 2024 Upper Austria Ladies Linz

Final
- Champions: (Italy) Sara Errani (Italy) Jasmine Paolini
- Runners-up: (United States) Nicole Melichar-Martinez (Australia) Ellen Perez
- Score: 7–5, 4–6, [10–7]

Details
- Draw: 16
- Seeds: 4

Events
Singles	Doubles
← 2023 ·	Linz Open	· 2025 →

Sara Errani and Jasmine Paolini won the doubles title at the 2024 Upper Austria Ladies Linz, defeating Nicole Melichar-Martinez and Ellen Perez in the final, 7–5, 4–6, [10–7].

Natela Dzalamidze and Viktória Hrunčáková were the reigning champions, but Dzalamidze chose to compete in Hua Hin instead. Hrunčáková partnered Alexandra Panova, but lost in the first round to Ulrikke Eikeri and Tereza Mihalíková.

== Seeds ==
1. (United States) Nicole Melichar-Martinez / (Australia) Ellen Perez (final)
2. (Norway) Ulrikke Eikeri / (Slovakia) Tereza Mihalíková (quarterfinals)
3. (Japan) Eri Hozumi / (Japan) Makoto Ninomiya (quarterfinals)
4. (United States) Asia Muhammad / (United States) Alycia Parks (quarterfinals)

== Draw ==
Key

- Q = Qualifier
- WC = Wild card
- LL = Lucky loser
- Alt = Alternate
- ITF = ITF entry
- PR = Protected ranking
- SR = Special ranking
- SE = Special exempt
- JE = Junior exempt
- JR = Junior Accelerator Programme entrant
- CO = College Accelerator Programme entrant
- NG = Next Gen Accelerator Program entrant
- w/o = Walkover
- r = Retired
- d = Defaulted

=== Draw ===
First round
1	(United States) N Melichar-Martinez (Australia) E Perez	6	6
(United Kingdom) A Barnett (United Kingdom) M Lumsden	1	1
E Alexandrova (United States) S Santamaria	6	6
(Hungary) A Bondár (Belgium) K Zimmermann	3	4
3	(Japan) E Hozumi (Japan) M Ninomiya	6	6
(France) E Lechemia (United Kingdom) O Nicholls	1	1
(Georgia (country)) O Kalashnikova (Poland) K Piter	4	6	[7]
(Italy) E Cocciaretto (Italy) M Trevisan	6	3	[10]
(Germany) A-L Friedsam (Ukraine) N Kichenok	6	6
I Khromacheva (Czech Republic) M Kolodziejová	2	3
WC	(Austria) M Klaffner (Austria) S Kraus	1	4
4	(United States) A Muhammad (United States) A Parks	6	6
Alt	A Anshba (Czech Republic) A Dețiuc	2	2
(Italy) S Errani (Italy) J Paolini	6	6
(Slovakia) V Hrunčáková; A Panova	5	6	[8]
2	(Norway) U Eikeri (Slovakia) T Mihalíková	7	2	[10]

Quarterfinals
1	(United States) N Melichar-Martinez (Australia) E Perez	3	7^{7}	[10]
E Alexandrova (United States) S Santamaria	6	6^{3}	[5]
3	(Japan) E Hozumi (Japan) M Ninomiya	6	1	[9]
(Italy) E Cocciaretto (Italy) M Trevisan	4	6	[11]
(Germany) A-L Friedsam (Ukraine) N Kichenok	7	1	[10]
4	(United States) A Muhammad (United States) A Parks	5	6	[8]
(Italy) S Errani (Italy) J Paolini	6	5	[10]
2	(Norway) U Eikeri (Slovakia) T Mihalíková	4	7	[8]

Semifinals
1	(United States) N Melichar-Martinez (Australia) E Perez	6	6
(Italy) E Cocciaretto (Italy) M Trevisan	4	4
(Germany) A-L Friedsam (Ukraine) N Kichenok	1	5
(Italy) S Errani (Italy) J Paolini	6	7

Final
1	(United States) N Melichar-Martinez (Australia) E Perez	5	6	[7]
(Italy) S Errani (Italy) J Paolini	7	4	[10]
