= 2025 Upper Austria Ladies Linz – Singles =

Singles
- 2025 Upper Austria Ladies Linz

Final
- Champion: Ekaterina Alexandrova
- Runner-up: (Ukraine) Dayana Yastremska
- Score: 6–2, 3–6, 7–5

Details
- Draw: 28 (4 WC, 6 Q)
- Seeds: 8

Events
| Singles | Doubles |
| ← 2024 · | Linz Open | · 2026 → |

Ekaterina Alexandrova defeated Dayana Yastremska in the final, 6–2, 3–6, 7–5 to win the singles title at the 2025 Upper Austria Ladies Linz. It was her fifth WTA Tour singles title.

Jeļena Ostapenko was the reigning champion, but did not participate this year.

== Seeds ==
The top four seeds received a bye into the second round.

1. (Czech Republic) Karolína Muchová (semifinals)
2. (Ukraine) Elina Svitolina (second round)
3. (Greece) Maria Sakkari (quarterfinals)
4. Ekaterina Alexandrova (champion)
5. (Ukraine) Dayana Yastremska (final)
6. Anastasia Potapova (quarterfinals)
7. (Armenia) Elina Avanesyan (second round)
8. (Denmark) Clara Tauson (semifinals)

== Draw ==
Key

- Q = Qualifier
- WC = Wild card
- LL = Lucky loser
- Alt = Alternate
- ITF = ITF entry
- PR = Protected ranking
- SR = Special ranking
- SE = Special exempt
- JE = Junior exempt
- JR = Junior Accelerator Programme entrant
- CO = College Accelerator Programme entrant
- NG = Next Gen Accelerator Program entrant
- w/o = Walkover
- r = Retired
- d = Defaulted

=== Finals ===
Semifinals
1/WC | (Czech Republic) Karolína Muchová | 0 | 4
4 | Ekaterina Alexandrova | 6 | 6
5 | (Ukraine) Dayana Yastremska | 6 | 6
8 | (Denmark) Clara Tauson | 1 | 4

Final
4 | Ekaterina Alexandrova | 6 | 3 | 7
5 | (Ukraine) Dayana Yastremska | 2 | 6 | 5

=== Top half ===
First round
(New Zealand) L Sun | 3 | 3
Q | (Spain) S Sorribes Tormo | 6 | 6
(Slovakia) R Šramková | 7 | 7
(Italy) E Cocciaretto | 5 | 5
WC | (Austria) J Grabher | 2 | 2
6 | A Potapova | 6 | 6
Q | A Sasnovich | 6 | 7^{7}
Q | A Zakharova | 3 | 6^{3}
WC | (Germany) E Lys | 4 | 7 | 3
Q | (Croatia) P Martić | 6 | 5 | 6
(Czech Republic) K Siniaková | 3 | 2
7 | (Armenia) E Avanesyan | 6 | 6

Second round
1/WC | (Czech Republic) K Muchová | 6 | 6
Q | (Spain) S Sorribes Tormo | 2 | 3
(Slovakia) R Šramková | 6^{1} | 4
6 | A Potapova | 7^{7} | 6
4 | E Alexandrova | 6 | 6
Q | A Sasnovich | 3 | 2
Q | (Croatia) P Martić | 6 | 4 | 7
7 | (Armenia) E Avanesyan | 4 | 6 | 5

Quarterfinals
1/WC | (Czech Republic) K Muchová | 6 | 3 | 6
6 | A Potapova | 3 | 6 | 3
4 | E Alexandrova | 3 | 6 | 6
Q | (Croatia) P Martić | 6 | 2 | 2

Semifinals
1/WC | (Czech Republic) K Muchová | 0 | 4
4 | E Alexandrova | 6 | 6

=== Bottom half ===
First round
5 | (Ukraine) D Yastremska | 7^{8} | 7
(Italy) L Bronzetti | 6^{6} | 5
(Egypt) M Sherif | 3 | 4
Q | (Croatia) A Ružić | 6 | 6
(Bulgaria) V Tomova | 7^{9} | 6
(Spain) J Bouzas Maneiro | 6^{7} | 4
8 | (Denmark) C Tauson | 6 | 6
(Ukraine) A Kalinina | 3 | 3
(Romania) S Cîrstea | 5 | 6 | 6
(Netherlands) A Rus | 7 | 2 | 3
Q | (Austria) S Kraus | 6^{3} | 2
A Blinkova | 7^{7} | 6

Second round
5 | (Ukraine) D Yastremska | 7 | 6
Q | (Croatia) A Ružić | 5 | 1
(Bulgaria) V Tomova | 3 | 2
3 | (Greece) M Sakkari | 6 | 6
8 | (Denmark) C Tauson | 6 | 6
(Romania) S Cîrstea | 2 | 4
A Blinkova | 6 | 6
2 | (Ukraine) E Svitolina | 4 | 4

Quarterfinals
5 | (Ukraine) D Yastremska | 7 | 6
3 | (Greece) M Sakkari | 5 | 0
8 | (Denmark) C Tauson | 6 | 6
A Blinkova | 4 | 3

Semifinals
5 | (Ukraine) D Yastremska | 6 | 6
8 | (Denmark) C Tauson | 1 | 4

== Qualifying ==
=== Seeds ===
1. (Netherlands) Suzan Lamens (qualifying competition)
2. (Belgium) Greet Minnen (qualifying competition)
3. (Hungary) Anna Bondár (first round)
4. (Germany) Jule Niemeier (withdrew)
5. (Turkey) Zeynep Sönmez (qualifying competition)
6. (Switzerland) Viktorija Golubic (qualifying competition)
7. (Spain) Nuria Párrizas Díaz (first round)
8. (Spain) Sara Sorribes Tormo (qualified)
9. (Romania) Anca Todoni (first round)
10. Anastasia Zakharova (qualified)
11. (Croatia) Petra Martić (qualified)
12. (Germany) Ella Seidel (qualifying competition)

=== Qualifiers ===
1. (Spain) Sara Sorribes Tormo
2. Anastasia Zakharova
3. Aliaksandra Sasnovich
4. (Croatia) Antonia Ružić
5. (Croatia) Petra Martić
6. (Austria) Sinja Kraus

=== Qualifying draw ===
==== First qualifier ====
First round
1 | (Netherlands) Suzan Lamens | 6 | 6
WC | (Austria) Tamara Kostic | 0 | 0
(Germany) Tamara Korpatsch | 4 | 5
8 | (Spain) Sara Sorribes Tormo | 6 | 7

Qualifying competition
1 | (Netherlands) Suzan Lamens | 2 | 6 | 3
8 | (Spain) Sara Sorribes Tormo | 6 | 0 | 6

==== Second qualifier ====
First round
2 | (Belgium) Greet Minnen | 6 | 6
(Switzerland) Rebeka Masarova | 4 | 2
WC | (Austria) Mavie Österreicher | 3 | 6^{2}
10 | Anastasia Zakharova | 6 | 7^{7}

Qualifying competition
2 | (Belgium) Greet Minnen | 0 | 6^{5}
10 | Anastasia Zakharova | 6 | 7^{7}

==== Third qualifier ====
First round
3 | (Hungary) Anna Bondár | 3 | 3
Aliaksandra Sasnovich | 6 | 6
(Switzerland) Céline Naef | 2 | 4
12 | (Germany) Ella Seidel | 6 | 6

Qualifying competition
Aliaksandra Sasnovich | 7 | 4 | 6
12 | (Germany) Ella Seidel | 5 | 6 | 4

==== Fourth qualifier ====
First round
Alt | (Serbia) Lola Radivojević | 3 | 2
(United Kingdom) Jodie Burrage | 6 | 6
(Croatia) Antonia Ružić | 6 | 6
9 | (Romania) Anca Todoni | 3 | 1

Qualifying competition
(United Kingdom) Jodie Burrage | 4 | 6^{1}
(Croatia) Antonia Ružić | 6 | 7^{7}

==== Fifth qualifier ====
First round
5 | (Turkey) Zeynep Sönmez | 6 | 6
(Italy) Lucrezia Stefanini | 3 | 3
WC | (Austria) Liel Marlies Rothensteiner | 4 | 1
11 | (Croatia) Petra Martić | 6 | 6

Qualifying competition
5 | (Turkey) Zeynep Sönmez | 4 | 3
11 | (Croatia) Petra Martić | 6 | 6

==== Sixth qualifier ====
First round
6 | (Switzerland) Viktorija Golubic | 6 | 6
(Belgium) Ysaline Bonaventure | 3 | 0
WC | (Austria) Sinja Kraus | 6 | 6
7 | (Spain) Nuria Párrizas Díaz | 1 | 2

Qualifying competition
6 | (Switzerland) Viktorija Golubic | 6^{3} | 6 | 3
WC | (Austria) Sinja Kraus | 7^{7} | 4 | 6
