= Donna Vekić =

Croatian tennis player (born 1996)

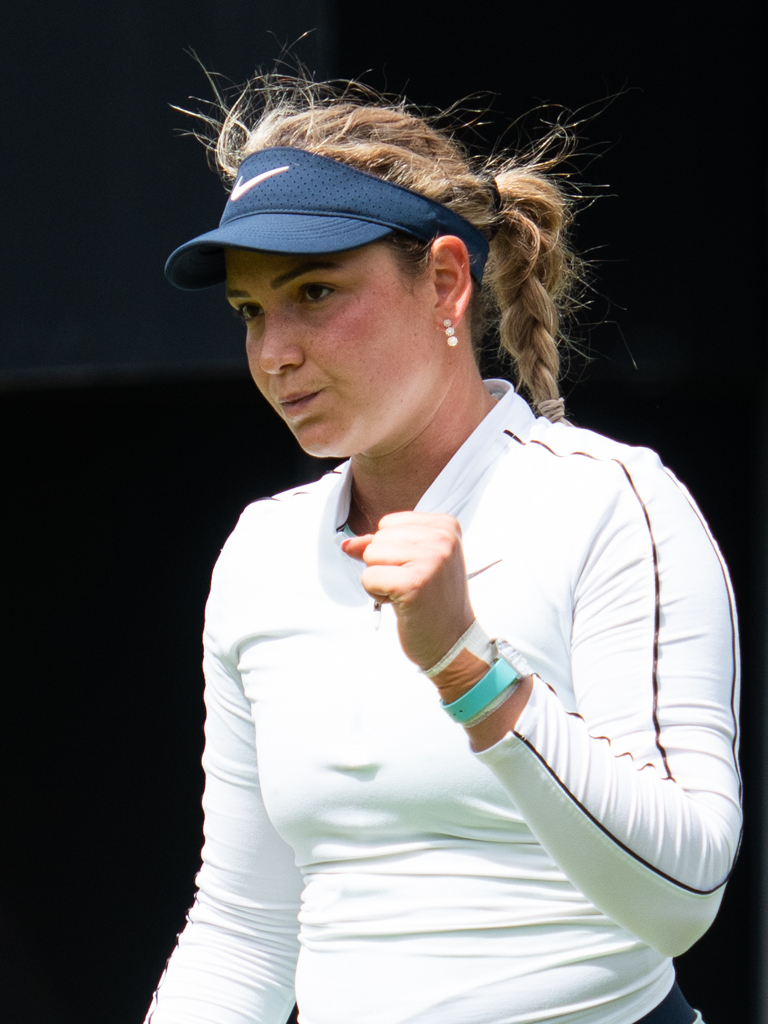
- Country (sports): Croatia
- Residence: Monte Carlo, Monaco
- Born: 28 June 1996 (age 30) Osijek, Croatia
- Height: 1.79 m (5 ft 10 in)
- Turned pro: 2012
- Plays: Right-handed (two-handed backhand)
- Coach: Biljana Veselinovic
- Prize money: US $11,239,356
- Official website: donnavekic.com

Singles
- Career record: 414–322
- Career titles: 5
- Highest ranking: No. 17 (27 January 2025)
- Current ranking: No. 40 (28 September 2026)

Grand Slam singles results
- Australian Open: QF (2023)
- French Open: 4R (2019)
- Wimbledon: SF (2024)
- US Open: QF (2019)

Other tournaments
- Olympic Games: F (2024)

Doubles
- Career record: 18–47
- Career titles: 0
- Highest ranking: No. 171 (20 August 2018)
- Current ranking: No. 1,113 (28 September 2026)

Grand Slam doubles results
- Australian Open: 2R (2015, 2018)
- French Open: 2R (2018)
- Wimbledon: 1R (2014, 2016, 2017, 2018, 2023)
- US Open: 3R (2023)

Grand Slam mixed doubles results
- Australian Open: 1R (2014)
- French Open: 1R (2024)
- Wimbledon: 2R (2013)

Team competitions
- BJK Cup: 16–8
- Hopman Cup: W (2023)
Medal record
Women's tennis
Representing Croatia
Olympic Games
Silver medal – second place	2024 Paris	Singles
- Last updated on: 28 September 2026.

Donna Vekić (Croatian pronunciation: [ʋěːkitɕ]; born 28 June 1996) is a Croatian professional tennis player. She achieved a career-high singles ranking of world No. 17 on 27 January 2025. Her best performance at a major is reaching the semifinals at the 2024 Wimbledon Championships, which she lost against Jasmine Paolini in the longest women's semifinal match in the history of the tournament. Vekić is also an Olympic silver medalist, in singles at the 2024 Paris Olympics.

Vekić has won five singles titles on the WTA Tour – at the 2014 Malaysian Open, the 2017 Nottingham Open, the 2021 Courmayeur Ladies Open, the 2023 Monterrey Open and the 2026 Queen's Club Championships. She has also won five titles in singles and one doubles title on the ITF Circuit.

== Early life ==
Vekić was born in Osijek to father Igor and mother Brankica. Her father was a goalkeeper for NK Osijek. She has a brother, Bruno.

She began playing tennis at the age of six, and trained at the IMG Academy from the age of nine.

== Career ==
=== 2012: First WTA Tour final ===
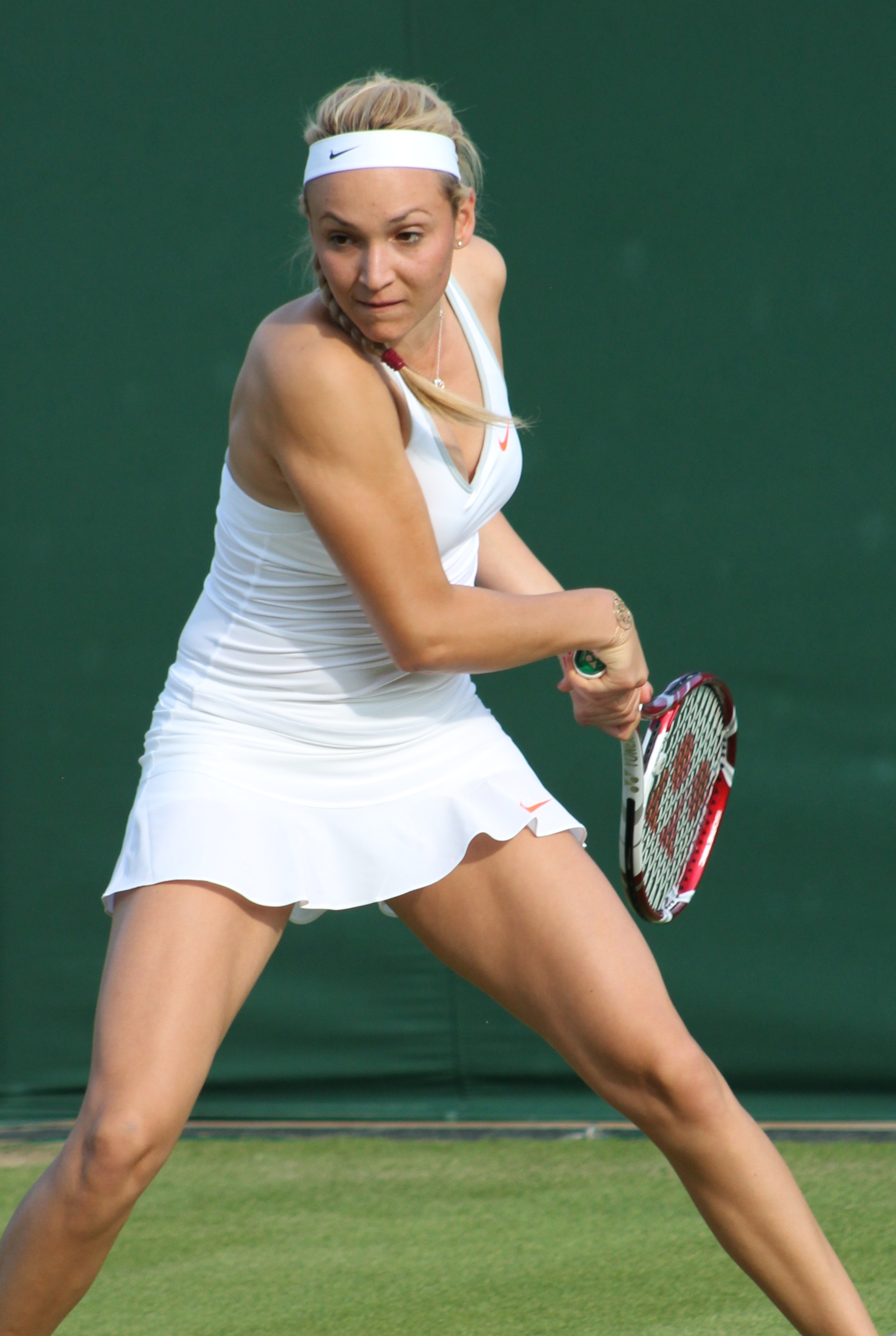
Vekić at the 2013 Wimbledon Championships

Vekić is a member of the Croatia Fed Cup team. In February 2012, she played three rubbers at the tournament, including helping her country to a 2–0 win over Bosnia and Herzegovina.

At the Tashkent Open, Vekić made it to her first final on the WTA Tour. It was her first main-draw appearance there, and she was the youngest player in six years to make it to the final of such an event. However, she was defeated by Irina-Camelia Begu in straight sets.

=== 2013: Top 100 debut ===
Vekić started her year off by entering the main draw of the Australian Open and defeated Andrea Hlaváčková in the first round. In the second, she fell to the tenth seed and former world No. 1, Caroline Wozniacki, in straight sets.

Vekić qualified (seeded 16th) for the main draw of the Miami Open by defeating Marta Sirotkina and Valeria Savinykh. In the first round, she beat fellow qualifier Yulia Putintseva. In the second, she lost to the 29th seed Elena Vesnina. At the Monterrey Open, she defeated Julia Cohen in the first round. In the second round, she lost to seventh seed Urszula Radwańska. Vekić won the $50k tournament in Istanbul, defeating Elizaveta Kulichkova in the final. Vekic ended the 2013 season ranked No. 86, her first top-100 season.

=== 2014: First WTA Tour title ===
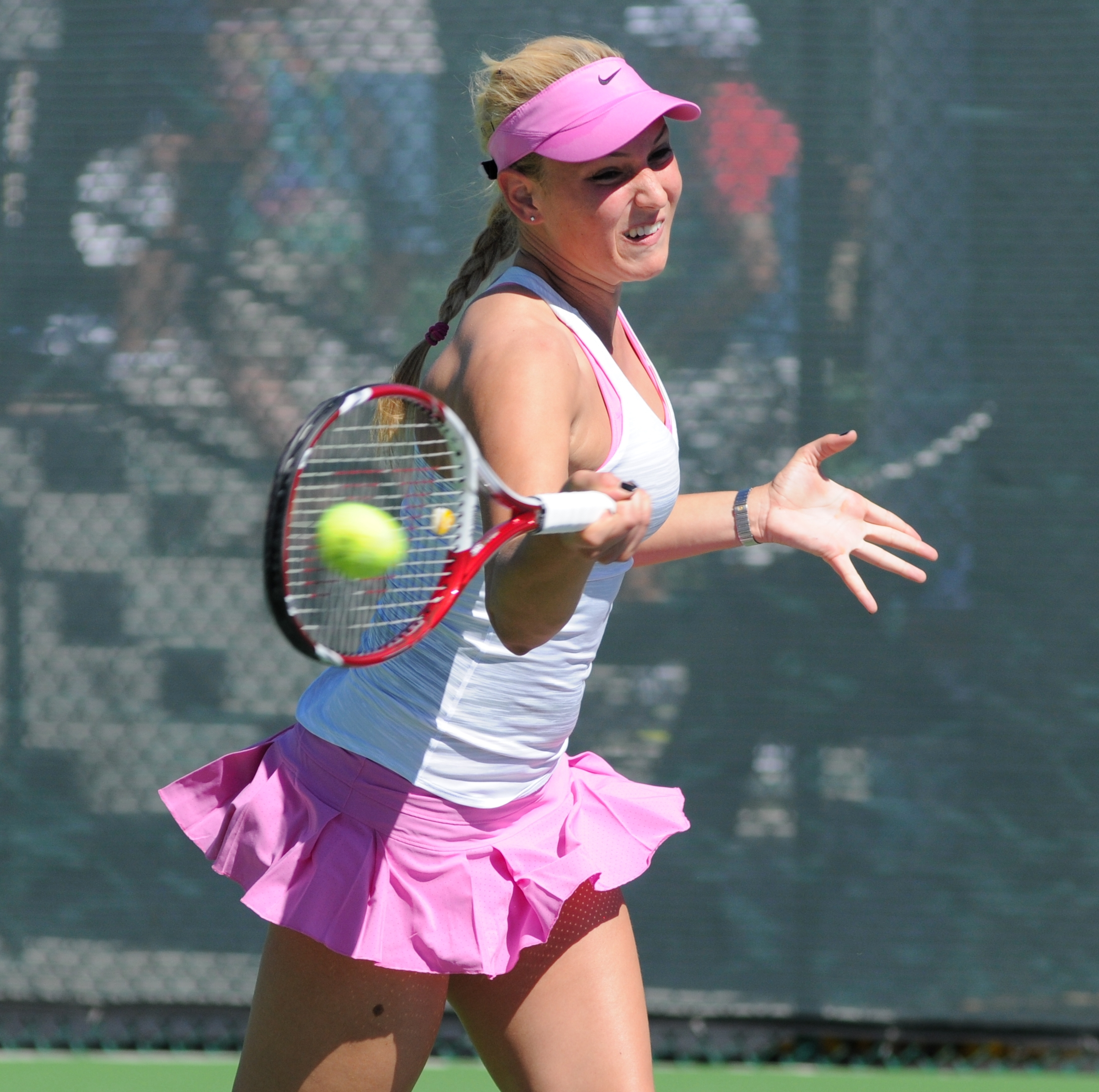
Vekić at the 2014 Indian Wells Open

Vekić began 2014 season at the Shenzhen Open where she lost in the first round to third seed Klára Zakopalová. At the Australian Open, she was defeated in the first round by qualifier Lucie Hradecká.

In Thailand at the Pattaya Open, she lost in the first round to top seed Sabine Lisicki. At the Brasil Tennis Cup, Vekić was defeated in the first round by third seed and eventual champion, Klára Zakopalová. In March, she was awarded a wild card for the Indian Wells Open where she lost in the second round to 12th seed Dominika Cibulková. At the Miami Open in Key Biscayne, Vekić came through qualifying with wins over Alla Kudryavtseva and Johanna Larsson. In the main draw, she upset 28th seed Svetlana Kuznetsova in the second round. She was defeated in the third round by eighth seed Petra Kvitová. At the Monterrey Open, Vekić beat fifth seed Garbiñe Muguruza in the first round in two tie-breaking sets, but lost to Karolína Plíšková in the second round, in three sets. Seeded seventh at the Malaysian Open, Vekić won her first career title by defeating top seed Dominika Cibulková in the final.

At the Madrid Open, Vekić was defeated in the final round of qualifying by Kristina Mladenovic. At the French Open in Roland-Garros, she lost in the first round to Julia Glushko.

Vekić played one grass-court tournament before Wimbledon, the Birmingham Classic where she was defeated in the first round by Belinda Bencic. At the Wimbledon Championships, Vekić stunned 21st seed Roberta Vinci in the first round but lost in the second round to 2010 Wimbledon finalist, Vera Zvonareva.

At the İstanbul Cup, Vekić was defeated in the first round by third seed Klára Koukalová. At the Baku Cup, she lost in the second round to Kristina Mladenovic.

Vekić started US Open Series at the Rogers Cup where she was eliminated in the first round of qualifying by Tamira Paszek. At the Cincinnati Open, she lost in the first round of qualifying to Monica Niculescu. At the Connecticut Open, she was defeated in the first round of qualifying by Belinda Bencic. In Flushing Meadows, she lost in the first round to CoCo Vandeweghe.

Seeded fifth at the Tashkent Open, Vekić was defeated in the second round by Urszula Radwańska. At the Korea Open, she lost in the first round to Maria Kirilenko. After qualifying for the first edition of the Wuhan Open, Vekić was defeated in the first round by 16th seed Andrea Petkovic.

=== 2015: Fourth WTA Tour final ===
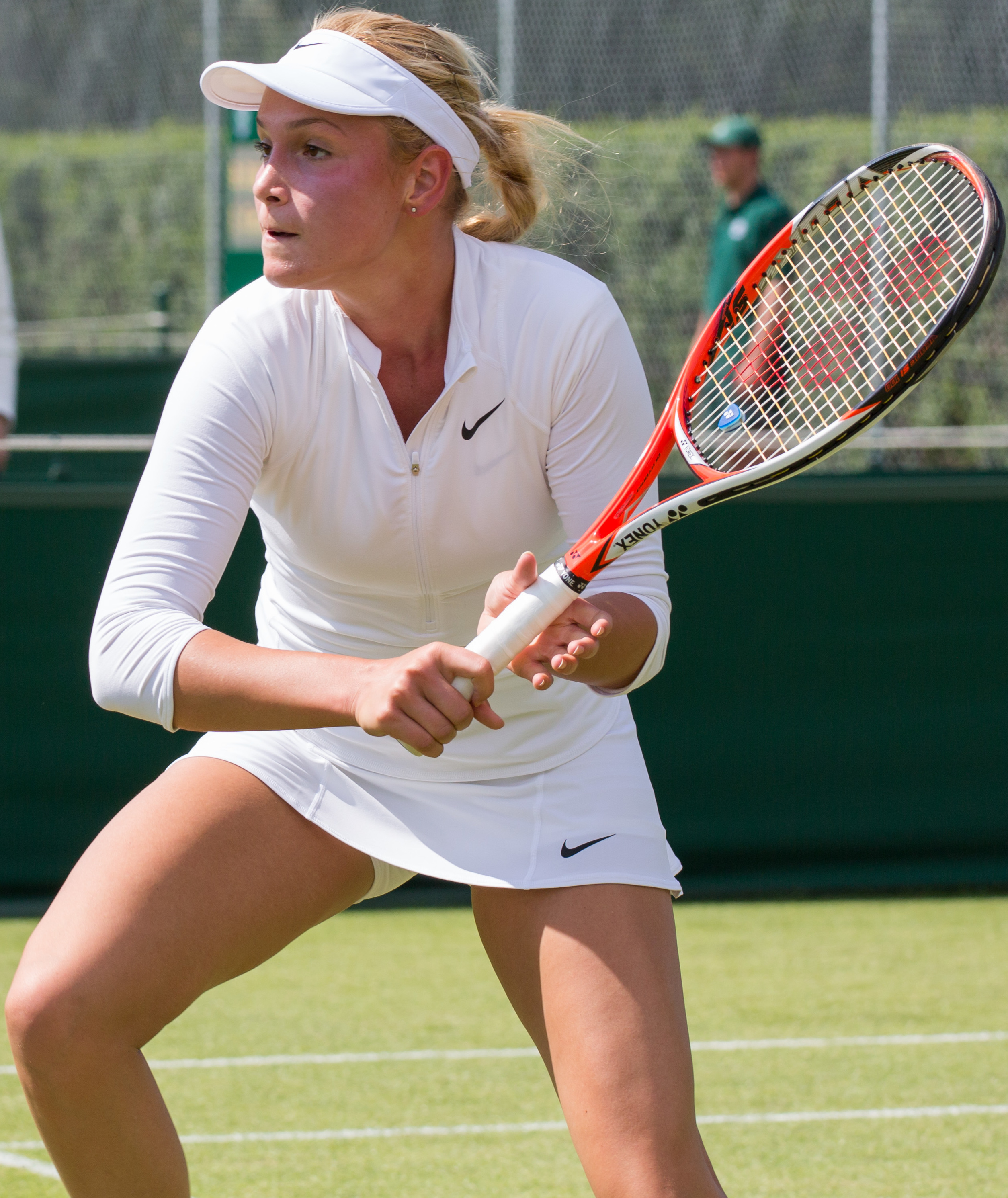
During the 2015 Wimbledon qualifying

After a bad start to the new season as world No. 81, Vekić beat Louisa Chirico at Indian Wells, before losing in the second round to Zarina Diyas. After her ranking dropped to No. 177, she entered the Lale Cup in Istanbul as the top seed but lost in the quarterfinals to the sixth seed, Margarita Gasparyan. She lost in the first round of the Marrakesh Grand Prix, and in the second round of the Madrid Open.

During the French Open, she claimed her first top-40 victory in the season when she beat Caroline Garcia, and also defeated Bojana Jovanovski before bowing out to Ana Ivanovic. After the French Open, she continued her bad form from the first half of the season by failing to qualify for Wimbledon or the US Open. In Tashkent, she reached the final with three-set wins over Kiki Bertens, Carina Witthöft and Anna-Lena Friedsam and a two-set victory over Evgeniya Rodina, but lost to Nao Hibino. She ended the season ranked No. 105.

=== 2016: Fifth ITF title ===
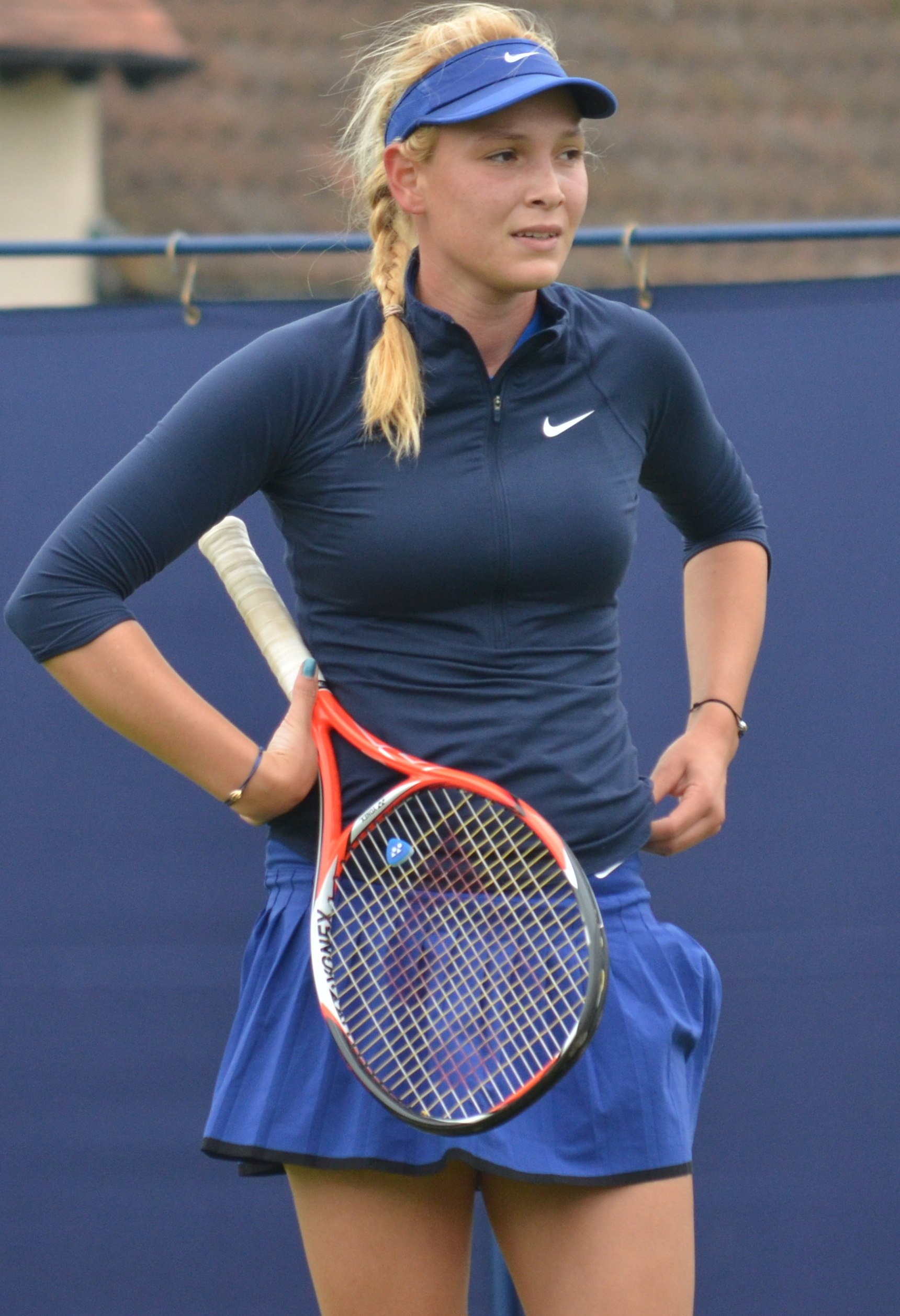
Vekić at the 2016 Aegon International Eastbourne

Vekić began the season ranked 103. At the Australian Open, she lost in the first round to qualifier Naomi Osaka. She reached the quarterfinals of the San Antonio Open, with wins over Aliaksandra Sasnovich and Kiki Bertens, before losing to Tsvetana Pironkova. She lost in the first round of ten consecutive WTA tournaments from February to August, including the French Open, where she lost to Madison Keys, and Wimbledon, where she took Venus Williams to a first-set tie-break but lost in straight sets.

At Cincinnati in August, Vekić had victories over Varvara Lepchenko and Mariana Duque Marino in qualifying, and defeated world No. 25 Ana Ivanovic, in the first round, before losing to tenth seed Johanna Konta in the second round. She failed to progress through qualifying for the US Open. In September, she reached the final of the ITF Saint Petersburg, with wins over Olga Doroshina, Anastasiya Komardina, Vesna Dolonc and Aryna Sabalenka, before losing the final to Natalia Vikhlyantseva, in straight sets. In Tashkent, she lost in the first round to Kateryna Kozlova. In Tianjin, after her victory over Zhang Kailin, she lost to the second seed, Svetlana Kuznetsova.

In October, at the Soho Square Tournament, she had victories over Laura Pigossi, Jaqueline Cristian (walkover) and Arantxa Rus, before she beat Maria Sakkari in three sets in the semifinals to reach her second ITF final of the year. In the final, she defeated Sara Sorribes Tormo in three sets to win the fifth ITF title of her career. In Poitiers, she lost in the first round to Lauren Davis, while at the Open de Limoges she reached the third round, where she lost in three sets to world No. 24 and top-seed, Caroline Garcia. Vekić ended the season ranked world No. 101.

=== 2017: Second career title ===
She reached the second round at the Australian Open and then lost to Caroline Wozniacki. Vekić won her second WTA Tour title at the Nottingham Open in June, defeating Johanna Konta in three sets. Two weeks later, in the second round of the Wimbledon Championships, she lost to Konta in three sets, with the final set lasting eighteen games. At the US Open, she reached the third round of a Grand Slam tournament for the first time since the 2015 French Open, easily losing to Anastasija Sevastova. Vekić broke into the top 50 for the first time in July, reached a career-high singles ranking of No. 45 on 25 September, and ended the season ranked No. 56.

=== 2018: Wimbledon fourth round, Top 50 year-end ===
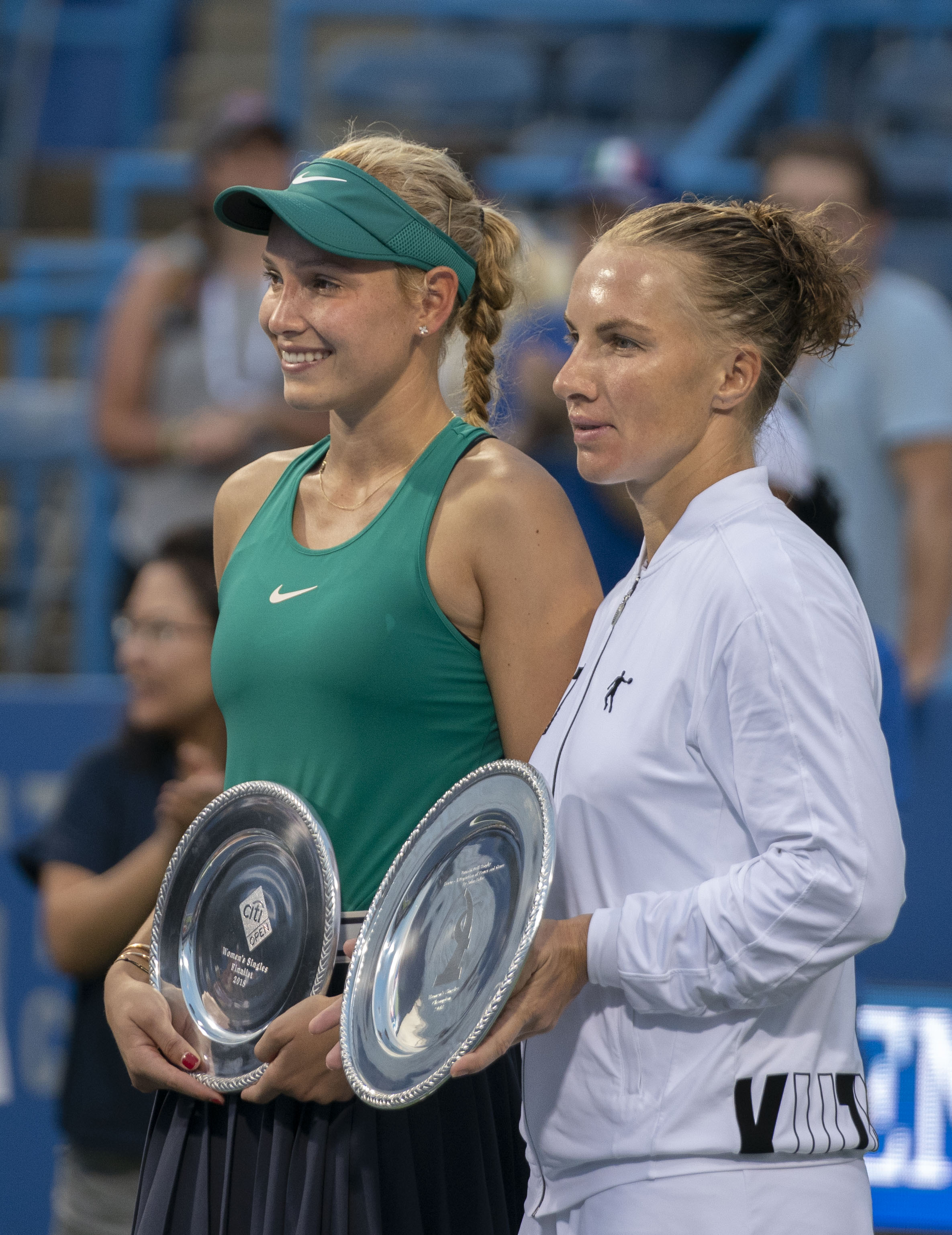
Vekić and Kuznetsova after the 2018 Washington Open final

At Wimbledon, Vekić reached the fourth round in a Grand Slam tournament for the first time in her career. She upset world No. 4, Sloane Stephens, in the first round, then beat Rebecca Peterson and Yanina Wickmayer in straight sets before losing to eventual semifinalist Julia Görges. Following Wimbledon, she made the final at the Washington Open; however, she lost to Svetlana Kuznetsova in three sets, after squandering four match points in the second set. In September, Vekić reached the semifinals in Tokyo by defeating top-10 players Sloane Stephens and Caroline Garcia. She ended the season ranked No. 34, her first year-end top 50 ranking.

=== 2019: US Open quarterfinal, top 20 ===
Vekić started the year strong by reaching the semifinals in Brisbane, but was unable to keep this momentum at the Australian Open, being upset in the second round by the Australian wild card and world No. 240, Kimberly Birrell. She rebounded at her next tournament, reaching the biggest final of her career at the St. Petersburg Trophy, a Premier-level event. Along the way, she upset the defending champion, world No. 2 and Australian Open runner-up, Petra Kvitová, in the quarterfinals, her first career win over the Czech. In the final, she was beaten by world No. 8, Kiki Bertens, in two close sets. She then reached another semifinal in Acapulco, losing to eventual champion Wang Yafan, before recording early round exits in both Indian Wells and Miami.

Vekić only played two clay-court warm-up tournaments, losing in the quarterfinals to world No. 1, Naomi Osaka, in Stuttgart and retiring in her third-round match against fellow Croatian Petra Martić in Madrid due to a foot injury.

Seeded 23rd at the French Open, Vekić advanced to the fourth round for the first time in her career, after upsetting world No. 15, Belinda Bencic, in the third round. She then lost to Johanna Konta, in straight sets.

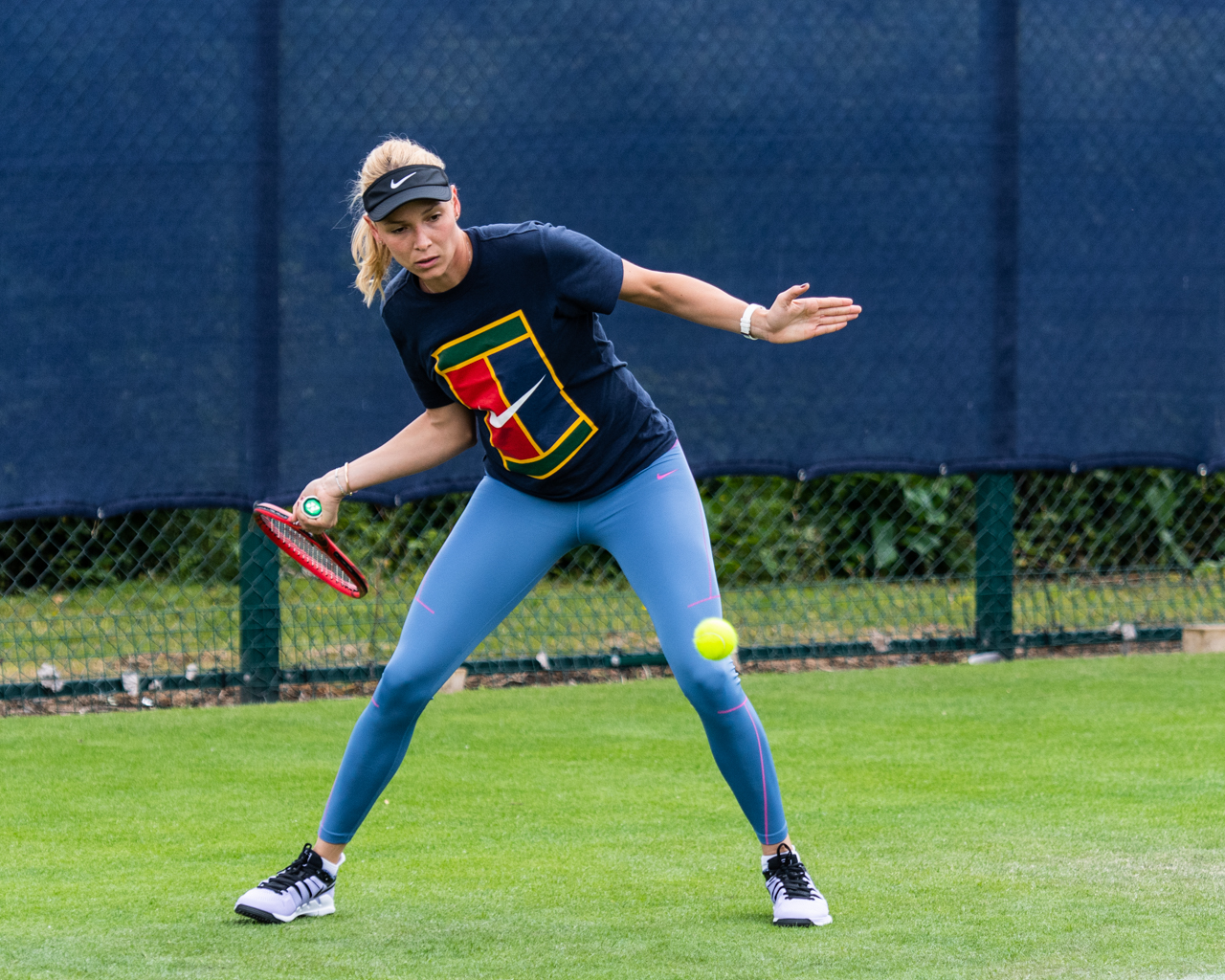
Vekić at the 2019 Nottingham Open

Opening the grass-court season in Nottingham, Vekić reached her second final of the year before falling to former world No. 4, Caroline Garcia, despite leading by a set and a break. After an opening-round loss to French Open champion Ashleigh Barty in Birmingham, Vekić was tabbed as a potential dark horse in the ladies' singles draw at Wimbledon. However, she was upset in three sets in her first round match by eventual quarterfinalist, American Alison Riske.

Rebounding from this disappointment, Vekić opened the summer hardcourt season with a semifinal showing in San Jose, before making the third round in Cincinnati where she fell to Venus Williams. Seeded 23rd at the US Open, Vekić defeated Richèl Hogenkamp, Kaia Kanepi, Yulia Putintseva and 26th seed Julia Görges to advance to her first Grand Slam quarterfinal, becoming the first Croatian woman to reach the last eight at the US Open since Ana Konjuh in 2016. There, she was beaten by the 13th seed Bencic, in straight sets.

Despite recording just two match wins in her next five tournaments following the US Open, Vekić qualified for the second-tier year-end singles tournament, the WTA Elite Trophy, for the first time in her career. Drawn in the Azalea Group with top seed Bertens and Dayana Yastremska, she fell in straight sets in both her matches, ending her season. Nonetheless, Vekić finished the year ranked No. 19, her first year-end top 20 finish.

=== 2020: WTA 500 quarterfinal ===
Vekić kicked off her 2020 season at the Brisbane International. She lost in the first round to qualifier Yulia Putintseva. Playing at the first edition of the WTA Premier Adelaide International, Vekić reached the quarterfinal where she was defeated by eventual finalist, Dayana Yastremska.

Seeded 19th at the Australian Open, Vekić beat 2008 champion and former world No. 1, Maria Sharapova, in the first round, and Alizé Cornet in the second. She lost in the third round to Iga Świątek.

At St. Petersburg, Vekić, the seventh seed and the previous year's finalist, was defeated in the second round by Ekaterina Alexandrova. Seeded 17th at the Qatar Ladies Open, she lost in the first round to Iga Świątek.

=== 2021: Australian Open fourth round, WTA title ===
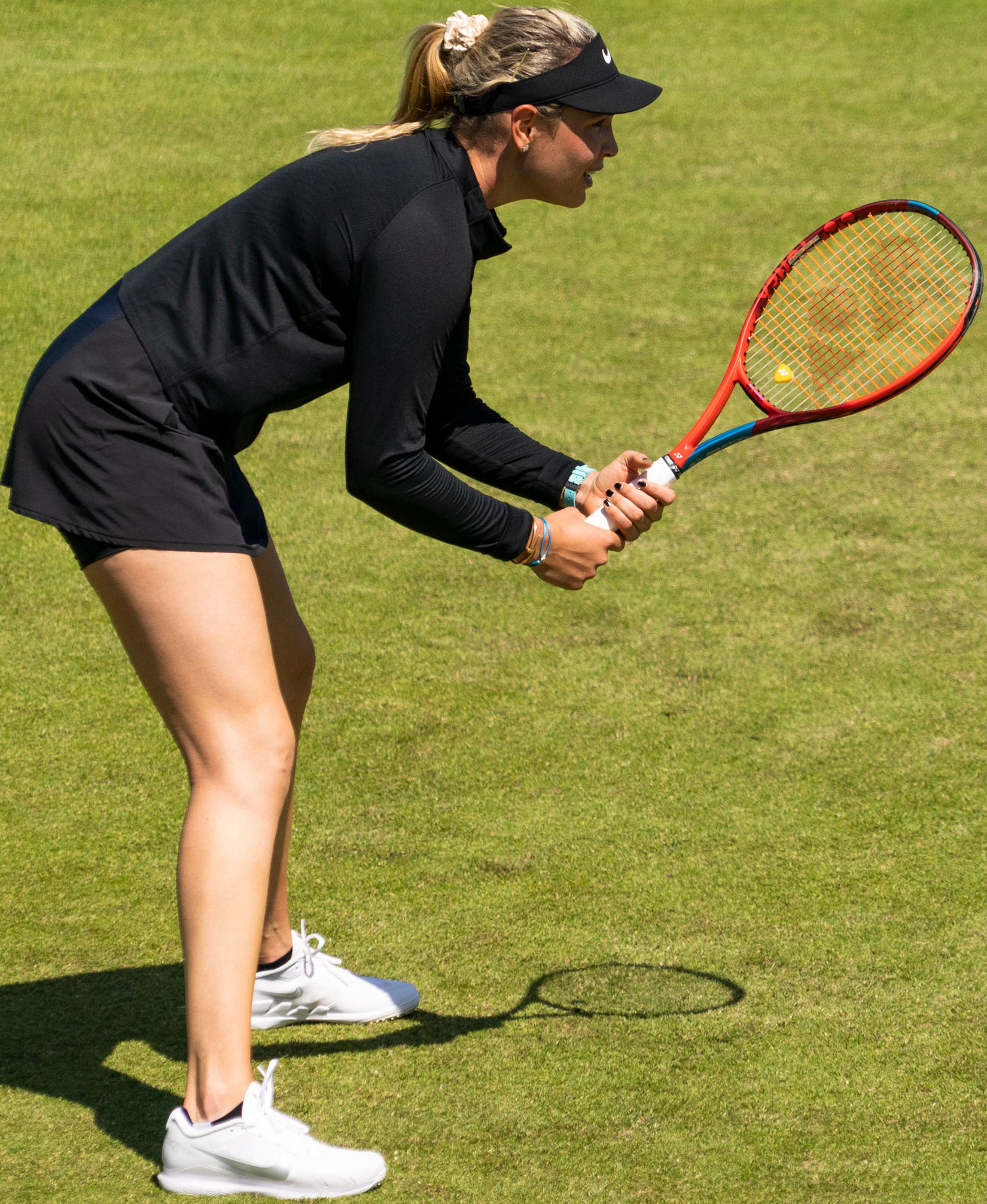
Vekić at the 2021 Nottingham Open

Vekić started her 2021 season at the first edition of the Abu Dhabi Open. Seeded 16th, she lost in the first round to Bernarda Pera. Seeded ninth at the first edition of the Yarra Valley Classic, she was defeated in the second round by Tsvetana Pironkova. Seeded 28th at the Australian Open, she achieved her best ever result by reaching the fourth round; she ended up being eliminated from the tournament by 22nd seed and eventual finalist, Jennifer Brady. With this run, she has reached the fourth round or better, completing the sweep of second-week appearances, at each of the four Grand Slam events. After the Australian Open, she underwent surgery on her right knee and said that she would be out of action for a while. Vekić returned in time for the French Open but was beaten in the first round by ninth seed Karolína Plíšková.

Seeded third at the Nottingham Open, her first grass-court tournament of the season, Vekić lost in the third round to 15th seed Nina Stojanović. Seeded third in Birmingham, she reached quarterfinals and was defeated by Heather Watson. At Wimbledon, she was eliminated in the second round by eighth seed and eventual finalist, Karolína Plíšková.

Representing Croatia at the Summer Olympics, Vekić upset third seed Aryna Sabalenka in the second round. She was beaten in the third round by 15th seed and eventual semifinalist, Elena Rybakina.

Vekić won her third WTA Tour title, and first since 2017, at the Courmayeur Open in October. As a result, she returned to the top 70 on 1 November 2021, climbing 30 positions.

=== 2022: Hiatus, second WTA 500 final, back to top 50 ===
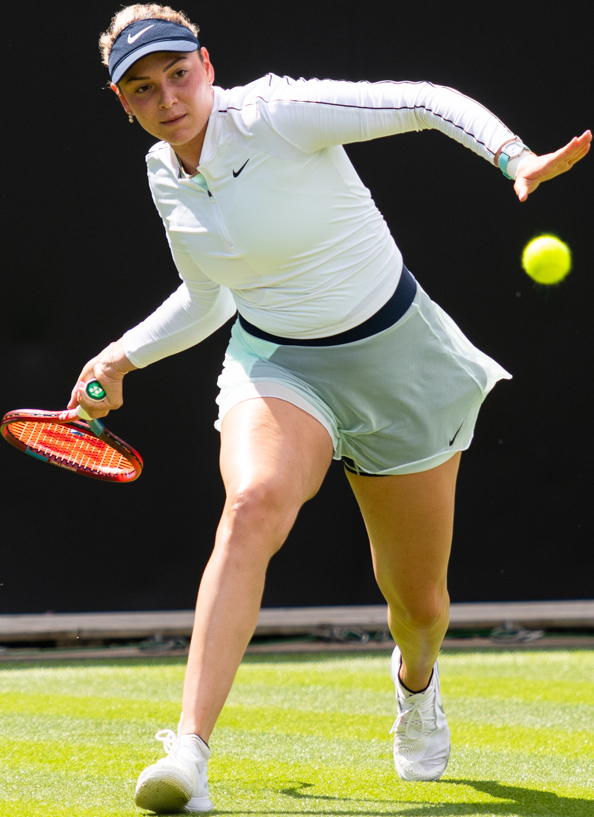
Vekić at the 2022 Birmingham Classic

She took a two-month hiatus between the Australian Open and before Roland Garros, returning to the WTA tour in April. Ranked No. 101, she qualified for the 2022 French Open as the sixth qualifier seed. It was the first time Vekić has had to contest qualifying for a major since the 2016 US Open, due to injury and missing play between the Australian Open and Roland Garros in 2021, leading to a dip in the rankings. After making the main draw at the French Open and a first-round win over Mirjam Björklund, she was defeated by Amanda Anisimova in the second round. At Wimbledon, Vekić lost in the first round to Jessica Pegula, in straight sets.

On 17 October 2022, she returned to the top 50 at world No. 47 for the first time since July 2021 after a final showing at the WTA 500 San Diego Open as a qualifier, defeating four straight top-25 players (including two in the top 10) en route before losing to Iga Świątek.

=== 2023: Monterrey title, Australian Open quarterfinals ===
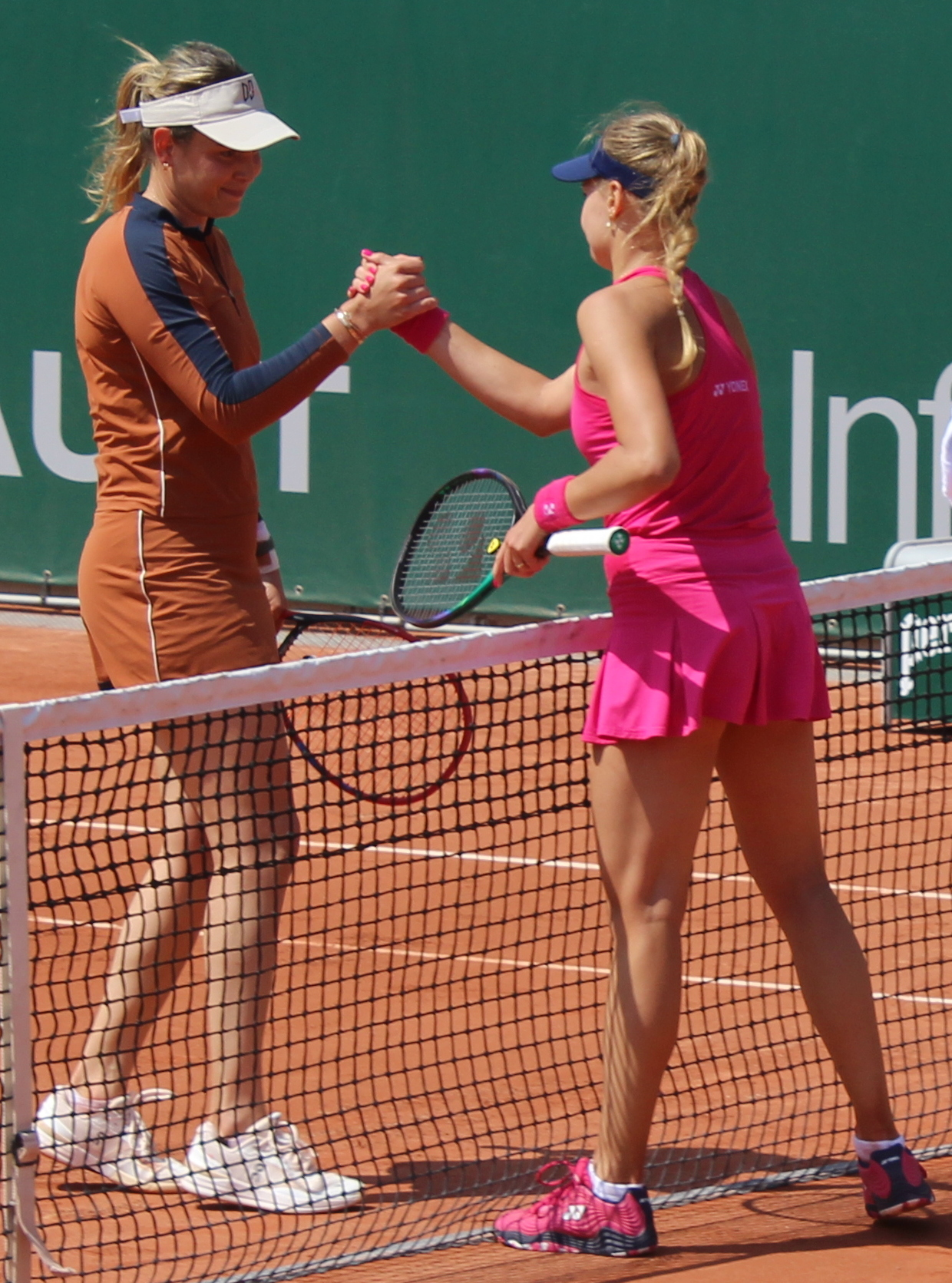
Vekić after beating Dayana Yastremska at the 2023 French Open

Vekić started her 2023 season at the 2023 United Cup, where she represented Croatia. She won all three of her matches in straight sets, including a win over French player Alizé Cornet. After the United Cup she entered the Australian Open ranked No. 64. There she defeated Oksana Selekhmeteva, 18th seed Liudmila Samsonova, Nuria Parrizas-Diaz and Linda Fruhvirtová to reach her first Australian Open quarterfinal. She lost to the eventual champion, Aryna Sabalenka, in straight sets. As a result, she moved up 30 places in the rankings and re-entered the top 40, at world No. 33 on 30 January 2023.

Vekić won her fourth career title defeating top seed Caroline Garcia in three tight sets at the Monterrey Open in Mexico. The victory was her first top-ten win of the season and first title since 2021. As a result, she returned to the top 25 on 6 March 2023. Five days later, she lost early to Lesia Tsurenko at Indian Wells in a three-set match where she refused a handshake from her opponent.

=== 2024: Wimbledon semifinal, Olympic silver medal ===
Seeded third, Vekić reached the semifinals at the Linz Open in February, recording wins over wildcard entrant Dayana Yastremska and Clara Burel, before losing to second seed Ekaterina Alexandrova.

The following month, she reached the quarterfinals at the San Diego Open, defeating wildcard entrant Katherine Hui and qualifier Marina Stakusic, but losing to eventual champion Katie Boulter in the last eight.

Vekić made her fifth grass-court final at the Bad Homburg Open in June defeating Viktoriya Tomova in the semifinals, before losing to Diana Shnaider in the final.

She reached a major semifinal for the first time in her career at Wimbledon by defeating Wang Xiyu, lucky loser Erika Andreeva, 28th seed Dayana Yastremska, Paula Badosa, and qualifier Lulu Sun. She became the first Croatian woman to reach the semifinals at the All England Club since Mirjana Lučić-Baroni in 1999 and the first to do so at any major since Lučić-Baroni at the 2017 Australian Open. Vekić lost what was the longest-ever Wimbledon women's singles semifinal to Jasmine Paolini.

At the Paris Olympics, she made the quarterfinals with wins over Lucia Bronzetti, Bianca Andreescu and second seed Coco Gauff. In the last eight, Vekić defeated 12th seed Marta Kostyuk on her fifth match point to become the first Croatian woman to reach the medal stage at the Olympics. She overcame Anna Karolína Schmiedlová in the semifinals, but then lost the Gold Medal match to Chinese player Zheng Qinwen in straight sets.

Vekić defeated qualifier Kimberly Birrell, Greet Minnen and Peyton Stearns to reach the fourth round at the US Open, where she lost to seventh seed Zheng Qinwen in three sets.

In December, Vekić announced she had hired Sascha Bajin as her new coach, replacing Nikola Horvat, who had quit the previous month for family reasons.

=== 2025: Australian Open fourth round ===
Vekić defeated Diane Parry, lucky loser Harriet Dart and 12th seed Diana Shnaider to make it through to the fourth round at the Australian Open, where she lost to 27th seed Anastasia Pavlyuchenkova.

Seeded 19th at the WTA 1000 event in Indian Wells, she received a bye and then overcame Elina Avanesyan and 10th seed Emma Navarro, before losing to fifth seed Madison Keys in the fourth round.

In April at the Madrid Open, Vekić received a bye as 19th seed and then defeated wildcard entrant Hailey Baptiste and 11th seed Emma Navarro to reach the fourth round, at which point she lost to fifth seed Madison Keys.

Vekic split with her coach Pam Shriver on 19 June 2025 and shortly after with Sascha Bajin, who started coaching Diana Shnaider in August 2025.

Seeded third at the Chennai Open in October, she defeated lucky loser Vaishnavi Adkar and wildcard entrant Sahaja Yamalapalli to make it into her first quarterfinal since the 2024 Paris Olympics. Vekić lost in the last eight to seventh seed Kimberly Birrell.

=== 2026: First WTA 500 title, back to top 50 ===
Vekić reached the final at the WTA 125 Philippine Women's Open, losing to Camila Osorio in three sets. Despite her performance she fell to her lowest WTA ranking in four years at world No. 95 on 2 February 2026. By the end of February, Vekić had dropped out of the top 100.

In April, she qualified for the main-draw at the WTA 500 2026 Upper Austria Linz and defeated fellow qualifier Katie Volynets in three sets, before being handed a walkover into the quarterfinals when Anhelina Kalinina withdrew from the tournament. Vekić overcame Karolína Plíšková in the last eight to make it into the semifinals, at which stage she lost to Anastasia Potapova. The following month as top seed at the WTA 125 İstanbul Open, Vekić was runner-up losing in the final to sixth seed Maria Timofeeva, in straight sets.

In June, she won her maiden WTA 500 title at the Queen's Club Championships as a lucky loser, becoming the first lucky loser in the Open Era to win a tournament above a WTA 250. Vekić was the seventh lucky loser overall to win a WTA Tour title, and the first since Sara Sorribes Tormo in 2023. She defeated Mika Stojsavljević, Marie Bouzková, Karolína Plíšková and Katie Boulter en route to the final. She defeated Emma Raducanu in the final in straight sets.

In September at the US Open, Vekić defeated Talia Gibson to snap a five-match losing streak stretching back to the Queen's final. She lost to 29th seed Ann Li in the second round.

== Personal life ==
Vekić was in a relationship with Stan Wawrinka from 2015 to 2019.

In 2021, she founded a luxury home fragrance brand, DNNA, selling beeswax candles and reed diffusers. She announced that a percentage of all sales revenue will be donated towards bee conservation in her native Croatia.

From 2021 to 2024, she opened three public tennis courts in her hometown of Osijek, all modeled after Grand Slam venues.

== Career statistics ==
=== Grand Slam performance timelines ===
Key
W	F	SF	QF	#R	RR	Q#	DNQ	A	NH

(W) winner; (F) finalist; (SF) semifinalist; (QF) quarterfinalist; (#R) rounds 4, 3, 2, 1; (RR) round-robin stage; (Q#) qualification round; (DNQ) did not qualify; (A) absent; (NH) not held; (SR) strike rate (events won / competed); (W–L) win–loss record.
To avoid confusion and double counting, these charts are updated at the conclusion of a tournament or when the player's participation has ended.

==== Singles ====
Current through the 2026 US Open.

Tournament	2012	2013	2014	2015	2016	2017	2018	2019	2020	2021	2022	2023	2024	2025	2026	SR	W–L	Win %
Australian Open	A	2R	1R	1R	1R	2R	2R	2R	3R	4R	1R	QF	1R	4R	1R	0 / 14	16–14	53%
French Open	A	1R	1R	3R	1R	1R	2R	4R	1R	1R	2R	2R	3R	2R	2R	0 / 14	12–14	46%
Wimbledon	A	1R	2R	Q2	1R	2R	4R	1R	NH	2R	1R	3R	SF	2R	1R	0 / 12	14–12	54%
US Open	Q3	2R	1R	Q2	Q3	3R	1R	QF	3R	1R	1R	1R	4R	2R	2R	0 / 12	14–12	54%
Win–loss	0–0	2–4	1–4	2–2	0–3	4–4	5–4	8–4	4–3	4–4	1–4	7–4	10–4	6–4	2–4	0 / 52	56–52	52%
Career statistics
Titles	0	0	1	0	0	1	0	0	0	1	0	1	0	0	1	Career total: 5		
Finals	1	1	1	1	0	1	1	2	0	1	1	2	1	0	1	Career total: 14		
Year-end ranking^{[4]}	118	86	84	105	101	56	34	19	32	67	69	23	19	72		$10,829,609		

==== Doubles ====
Tournament	2013	2014	2015	2016	2017	2018	2019	...	2022	2023	2024	2025	W–L
Australian Open	A	1R	2R	A	A	2R	1R		A	1R	1R	A	2–6
French Open	A	1R	A	A	1R	2R	A		A	A	A	A	1–3
Wimbledon	A	1R	A	1R	1R	1R	A	NH	A	1R	A	A	0–5
US Open	1R	1R	A	A	1R	A	A		1R	3R	A	A	2–5
Win–loss	0–1	0–4	1–1	0–1	0–3	2–3	0–1		0–1	2–3	0–1	0–0	5–19

=== Olympic Games medal matches ===
==== Singles: 1 (silver medal) ====
Result	Year	Tournament	Surface	Opponent	Score
Silver	2024	Paris Olympics	Clay	(China) Zheng Qinwen	2–6, 3–6
