= Dayana Yastremska =

Ukrainian tennis player (born 2000)

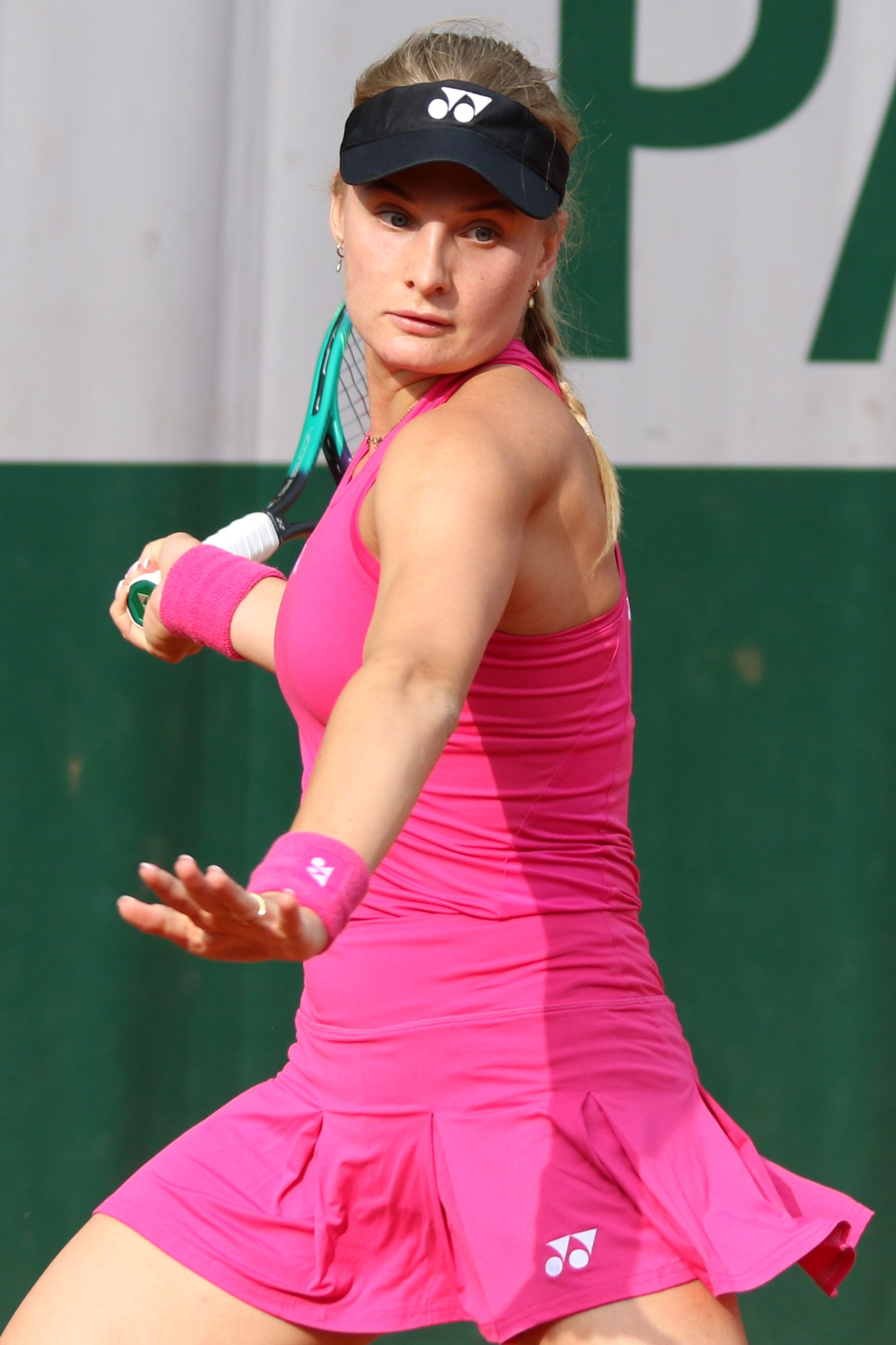
- Yastremska at the 2023 French Open
- Native name: Даяна Ястремська
- Country (sports): Ukraine
- Residence: Lyon, France (Note: Yastremska was forced to flee her hometown and residence, Odesa, due to the 2022 Russian invasion of Ukraine.)
- Born: 15 May 2000 (age 26) Odesa, Ukraine
- Height: 1.75 m (5 ft 9 in)
- Turned pro: 2015
- Plays: Right (two-handed backhand)
- Coach: Emmanuel Heussner, Marcis Garuts
- Prize money: $6,998,982

Singles
- Career record: 285–216
- Career titles: 3
- Highest ranking: No. 21 (20 January 2020)
- Current ranking: No. 97 (26 October 2026)

Grand Slam singles results
- Australian Open: SF (2024)
- French Open: 3R (2024, 2025)
- Wimbledon: 4R (2019)
- US Open: 3R (2019)

Other tournaments
- Olympic Games: 2R (2024)

Doubles
- Career record: 49–52
- Career titles: 0 WTA, 3 ITF
- Highest ranking: No. 82 (6 January 2020)
- Current ranking: No. 16 (26 October 2026)

Grand Slam doubles results
- Australian Open: 3R (2022)
- French Open: 3R (2026)
- Wimbledon: 2R (2026)
- US Open: 3R (2021)

Other doubles tournaments
- Olympic Games: 2R (2024)

Grand Slam mixed doubles results
- Wimbledon: 1R (2024)
- US Open: SF (2021)
- Last updated on: 26 October 2026.

Dayana Oleksandrivna Yastremska (Ukrainian: Даяна Олександрівна Ястремська; born 15 May 2000) is a Ukrainian professional tennis player and musician. She has been ranked as high as world No. 21 in singles by the WTA, and No. 82 in doubles, both achieved in January 2020. Yastremska has won three WTA Tour titles. Her best major performance is reaching the semifinals at the 2024 Australian Open.

A junior Grand Slam tournament runner-up in both singles and doubles, Yastremska had a quick breakthrough onto the WTA Tour. She made her debut in the top 100 and won two titles when she was 18 years old, including her first at the Hong Kong Open in 2018. She had a successful 2019 that helped her rise from No. 58 at the start of the year up to No. 22 by the end of the season. Yastremska was suspended provisionally from competition at the start of 2021 after testing positive for mesterolone. On 22 June 2021, the International Tennis Federation ruled that Yastremska was not responsible for the positive result, and that she was eligible to return to competition immediately. She made her return to the tour at the Hamburg Open.

== Early life and background ==
Dayana Yastremska was born on 15 May 2000 to Marina and Oleksandr Yastremsky in Odesa, the third-largest city in Ukraine. She has a sister Ivanna who is six years younger. Her father had been a volleyball player and also has served on the Odesa City Council. When Yastremska was five years old, her grandfather Ivan introduced her to tennis. After trying other sports such as gymnastics and swimming, she chose to focus on tennis, saying at the age of twelve, "I chose tennis because it is very hard and beautiful. I love work and I want to write my new history in tennis." She entered her first tournament when she was seven and finished in third place, despite the event being open to children who were several years older. Yastremska credits her parents for her success at tennis, saying, "When I was younger I had to sacrifice a lot of things but now I’m not regretting it... I have to say a big thank you to my parents because if they didn’t push me in the right moment then I don’t think I’d have the life I have right now."

== Career ==
=== Juniors ===
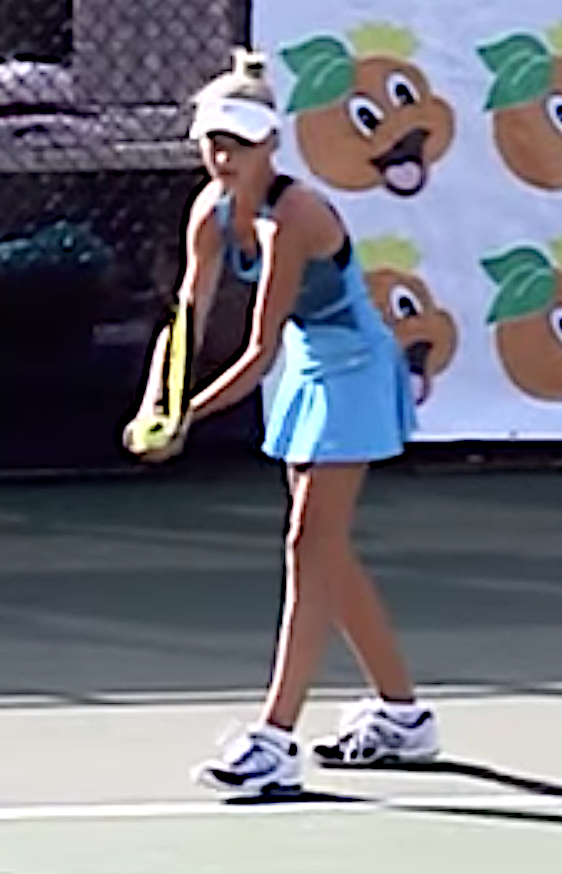
Yastremska at the 2012 Junior Orange Bowl

Yastremska had early success as a junior, finishing runner-up at the 12-and-under Junior Orange Bowl in 2012. She made her debut on the ITF Junior Circuit in March 2014 at the age of 13. Towards the end of the year, she won her first title at a Grade 4 event in November. With this success, she moved up to playing higher-level tournaments more regularly. Yastremska reached a Grade 1 semifinal in July in Austria and won a Grade 2 title in August in Hungary. She made her debut at the highest-level Grade A tournaments in October, reaching the quarterfinals at the Osaka Mayor's Cup in Japan. She fared better in doubles, finishing runner-up to two Japanese players.

Yastremska made her junior major debut at the 2016 Australian Open, where she made the singles quarterfinals. In doubles, she made it to the final, losing to Anna Kalinskaya and Tereza Mihalíková alongside compatriot Anastasia Zarycká. Yastremska only played Grade A tournaments the rest of the year. At the Copa Gerdau, she lost in the singles semifinals to Amanda Anisimova. In the doubles event, she partnered with Panna Udvardy to win the only Grade A title of her career, defeating the American team of Caty McNally and Natasha Subhash. After a third round appearance in singles at the 2016 French Open, Yastremska concluded her junior career at Wimbledon. At her last event, she made her only junior Grand Slam singles final. After upsetting top seed Olesya Pervushina in the semifinals, she finished runner-up to Anastasia Potapova. This helped her reach a career-high junior ranking of No. 6 in the world.

=== 2015–17: Five ITF titles ===
Yastremska began playing low-level events on the ITF Women's Circuit in 2015. Her best result of the year was a semifinal loss to Markéta Vondroušová at a $10k event in Sharm El Sheikh. She won her first title in March 2016 at the $25k event in Campinas, Brazil, where she came through qualifying and defeated No. 157 Alizé Lim in the final. A month and a half later, she made her WTA Tour main-draw debut at the İstanbul Cup at the age of 15. As a wildcard, she lost her opening-round match to Nao Hibino. A year later, Yastremska was awarded another wildcard into the same tournament and defeated Andrea Petkovic for her first career WTA match win. She made it to the quarterfinals, where she lost to Jana Čepelová despite having two chances to serve for the match. Yastremska qualified for her only other WTA main draw of the year at the Nottingham Open, losing in the first round. In September, Yastremska won a $60k title at the Ladies Open Dunakeszi. With this title, she rose from No. 272 to No. 202. Later that month, she defeated top seed and world No. 46, Donna Vekić, in the semifinals of the $100k Neva Cup, before losing to Belinda Bencic in the final. This runner-up finish brought her into the top 200 for the first time at No. 174. Yastremska also had a strong season in doubles, winning three ITF titles, including the $80k Prague Open with Anastasia Potapova.

=== 2018: Hong Kong title, top 100 ===
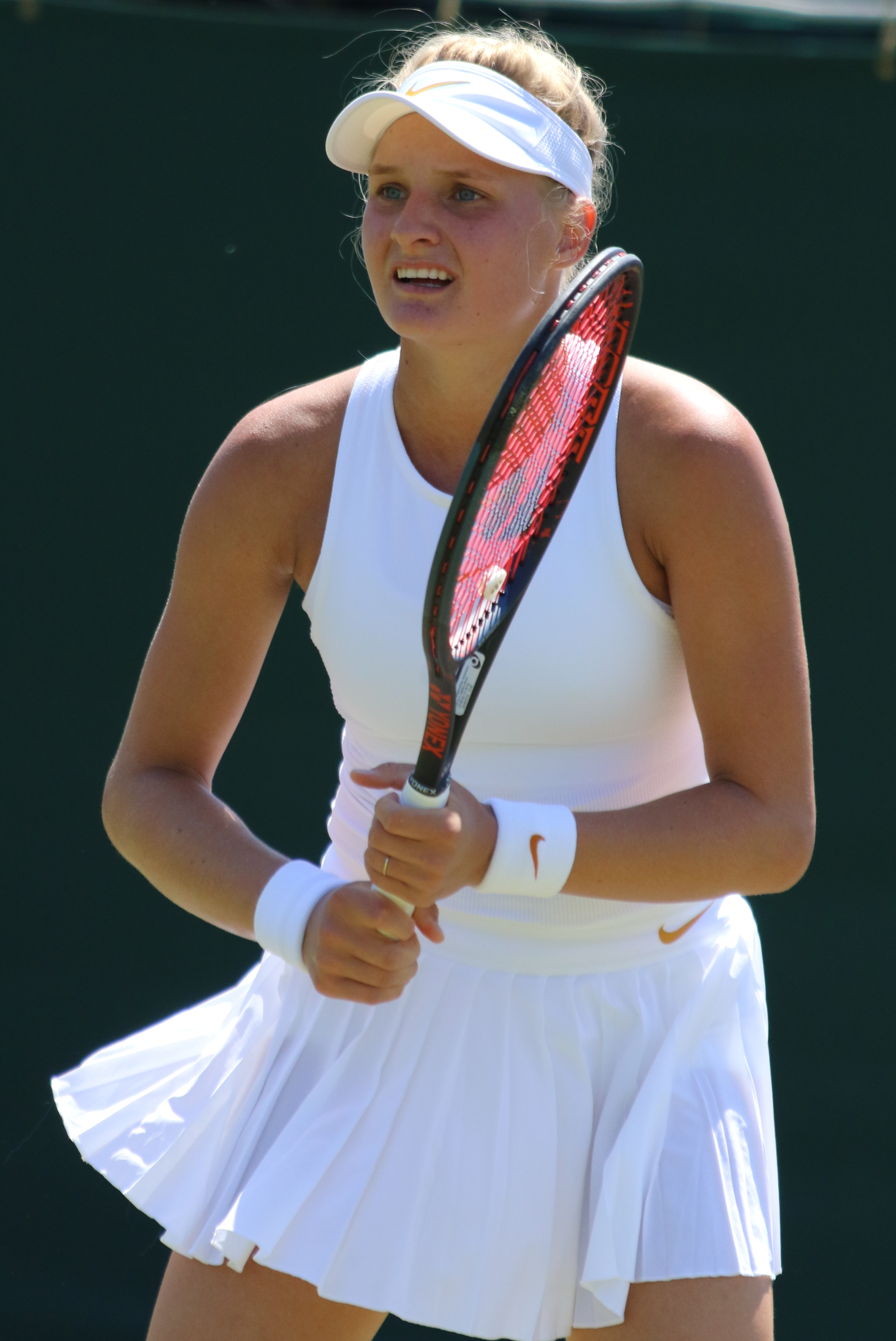
Yastremska at the 2018 Wimbledon qualifying

Yastremska had a slow start into the 2018 season. She lost in the second round of qualifying at the Australian Open. After injuring her ankle at the Mexican Open in February, she did not enter any tournaments in March. With a ranking well outside of the top 100, she needed to enter qualifying at her first seven tournaments of the year, reaching three main draws. At the last of these events, Yastremska produced her best result, finishing runner-up to Rebecca Peterson at the $100k Open de Cagnes-sur-Mer. This result took her into the top 150 for the first time. She also reached the final at the $100k Ilkley Trophy, losing to Tereza Smitková in a third-set tiebreak. She did not enter the French Open and lost in the qualifying competition at Wimbledon. During the second week of Wimbledon, Yastremska won the separate $60k Internazionale Antico Tiro a Volo in Rome. She defeated Potapova in the final in 45 minutes, only losing one game. With this title, she made her debut in the top 100 at the age of 18.

In the second half of the season, Yastremska had more success on the WTA Tour. She qualified for the Premier-level Connecticut Open where she upset No. 36, Danielle Collins, for her only main-draw match win. The following week, she made her Grand Slam main-draw debut and was upset in her opening-round match by qualifier Karolína Muchová. Yastremska made her breakthrough on the tour in her last two tournaments of the year. In October, she won her maiden WTA Tour title at the Hong Kong Open without dropping a set. She defeated three top 100 Chinese players in the event, including No. 40 Zhang Shuai and No. 24 Wang Qiang in the semifinals and final, respectively. The following week, she returned to Europe and reached another semifinal at the Luxembourg Open. She recorded her first career top-20 victory against No. 13, Garbiñe Muguruza, before losing to Belinda Bencic in a third-set tiebreak. With these two results, she rose from No. 110 at the start of the month to No. 58 by the end of the year.

=== 2019: Two career titles, top 25 ===
Yastremska continued to rise in the WTA rankings throughout the season, her first full year on the WTA Tour. After a quarterfinal appearance at the Hobart International, she won her first two Grand Slam main draw matches at the Australian Open before losing to Serena Williams in the third round. At her next tournament, she won her second WTA Tour title at the Hua Hin Championships in Thailand. She upset top seed Muguruza again in the quarterfinal, and then defeated Ajla Tomljanović in the final in a third-set tiebreak. This title brought Yastremska to No. 34 in the world. Following this title, however, she began to struggle and only tallied one match win in her next six tournaments in part due to playing through an ankle injury.

In late May, Yastremska recovered to win another title at the Internationaux de Strasbourg. She upset No. 11, Aryna Sabalenka, in the semifinals and then defeated No. 24, Caroline Garcia, in another third-set tiebreak in a nearly three-hour match for the title.

While she lost her opening-round match at the French Open to Carla Suárez Navarro, she reached the fourth round at Wimbledon, her best Grand Slam result to date. She upset No. 28 Sofia Kenin before losing to Zhang Shuai.

In the second half of the season, Yastremska produced another good performance at a major at the US Open, losing in the third round to compatriot and world No. 5, Elina Svitolina. She then achieved her best Premier 5 result of the year, a quarterfinal at the Wuhan Open. During the event, Yastremska upset world No. 2, Karolína Plíšková, before losing to No. 7, Petra Kvitová. Her win over Plíšková was her first career top-10 victory. Yastremska followed up this performance with her best doubles result of the year. She partnered with Jeļena Ostapenko at the Premier Mandatory China Open and won four matches to reach the final. They upset top seeds Hsieh Su-wei and Barbora Strýcová in their second match before finishing runner-up to Kenin and Bethanie Mattek-Sands. At the end of season, Yastremska unexpectedly qualified for the WTA Elite Trophy, the second-tier year-end championships, after several higher-ranked players withdrew from consideration. She was placed in a group with No. 20, Donna Vekić, and No. 10, Kiki Bertens. After both her and Bertens defeated Vekić in their opening matches, Yastremska lost to Bertens and did not advance out of her group. She finished the season at a career-high of No. 22 in the world.

=== 2020: First Premier final ===
Yastremska had a strong start into the 2020 season. She reached the final at the Premier-level Adelaide International. During the event, she defeated three top-20 players, including No. 12 Aryna Sabalenka, before finishing runner-up to world No. 1, Ashleigh Barty, who won the title in her home country. At the Australian Open, she lost to Caroline Wozniacki in the second round.

Ukraine played their Fed Cup Group I tournament in Estonia, where Yastremska was victorious in all three of her singles matches. She then lost in the first round in Dubai to Veronika Kudermetova, before falling to Garbiñe Muguruza in the third round in Doha. This was her last match before international tennis was suspended due to the COVID-19 pandemic.

International tennis resumed in Palermo in August, where Yastremska lost to Camila Giorgi in the singles quarterfinals. Moving to New York, she lost to Naomi Osaka in the third round of the relocated Cincinnati Premier-5 tournament, before falling to Madison Brengle in the second round of the US Open. Returning to Europe, she lost to Simona Halep in the third round of the Italian Open and, in a big upset, to world No. 785 Daria Gavrilova in the first round of the French Open.

First-round losses in Ostrava and Linz completed a disappointing end to the season, one in which her only success in doubles was a win in the Fed Cup tie against Estonia. She lost in the first round of all six tournaments she played.

=== 2021: Provisional doping suspension ===
On 7 January 2021, the ITF announced that, in November 2020, Yastremska had tested positive for a metabolite of mesterolone, an anabolic steroid medication which is prohibited by WADA. The ITF announced that, as a result of testing positive for this banned substance, Yastremska shall be provisionally suspended, "pending determination of the charge against her at a full hearing". That same day, Yastremska released a statement on Twitter, in which she denied the charges against her, asserting that she "[has] never used any performance-enhancing drugs or any prohibited substances", and that she believes the positive result to be as a result of contamination. She further stated that she and her team are "resolutely determined to do everything to clear [her] name". After travelling to Melbourne, she applied for her suspension by the ITF to be lifted; this request was denied by an independent tribunal on 23 January. Her appeal against a doping ban was fast-tracked in order for her case to be resolved before the Australian Open, which began on 8 February 2021. The CAS said it would make a decision by 3 February 2021. On that date, the CAS announced that it had dismissed her appeal, and that the provisional suspension enforced by the ITF on 7 January would be upheld until the ITF reached a final decision. After the CAS released their statement, Yastremska acknowledged the provisional suspension, but said that she couldn't "express [her] disappointment about not being able to take part in the first Slam of the year" due to her suspension. She also stated that she is "confident" that she and her team will "prove [her] innocence". She vowed to "clear my name". The CAS announced on 27 April 2021 that a second application filed by Yastremska to lift her suspension had been denied, and, on 7 May 2021, they announced that an appeal filed by Yastremska against the decision to not lift her provisional suspension had been dismissed, and that she would be ineligible for competition, "pending the final resolution of her case".

On 22 June 2021, the ITF ruled that Yastremska "bore no fault or negligence" for the positive test result, and announced that her provisional suspension would be lifted with immediate effect. She would serve no period of ineligibility, and would be able to resume competition immediately. Due to the late decision by the ITF, Yastremska was ineligible to compete at Wimbledon; as such, Yastremska returned to the tour at Hamburg. Playing as the top seed, she defeated Magdalena Fręch and Sara Errani, before being defeated by the qualifier and eventual champion Elena-Gabriela Ruse. Her next tournament was at the Tokyo Olympics, where she suffered two first-round defeats: to Leylah Fernandez in the singles event, and, partnering Elina Svitolina, to Alizé Cornet and Fiona Ferro of France in the doubles competition.

Her U.S. and Canadian tournaments saw little success with first-round losses at the Silicon Valley Classic, Canadian Open, and US Open and second-round losses at the San Diego Open, Chicago Fall Tennis Classic, and Indian Wells Open to eventual champion Paula Badosa. She retired in the first round at Portorož against eventual champion Jasmine Paolini. After losing in the first round at the Kremlin Cup, she reached the quarterfinals at the Courmayeur Ladies Open in a rematch against Paolini and lost in straight sets. Yastremska concluded her season with another rematch and loss against Paolini at the Upper Austria Ladies Linz. She finished year ranked inside the top 100 at 97.

=== 2022–23: WTA 250 final, top 100 ===
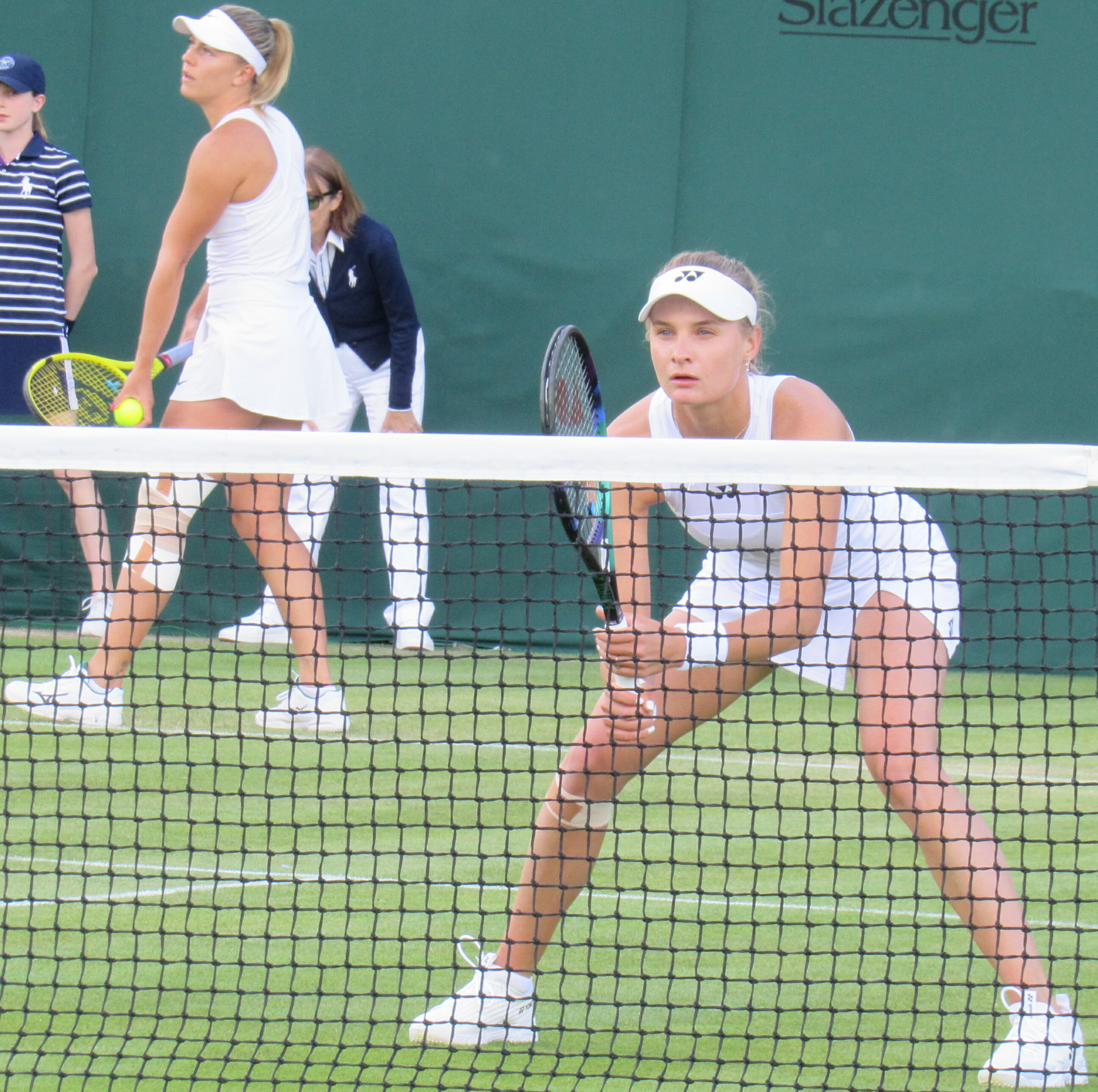
Yastremska in a doubles action along with Dalma Gálfi (back) at the 2022 Wimbledon Championships

The beginning of the season started with Yastremska's first season opener in Australia since 2020. She was eliminated in the first round of qualifying at the 2022 Melbourne Summer Set 1 and in the first round of the main draw at the 2022 Adelaide International 2. Her Australian trip concluded with a retirement against Madison Brengle in the opening round at the 2022 Australian Open. Her ranking dropped to 150 at the conclusion of the Australian Open.

Yastremska entered the main draw of the 2022 Dubai Championships as a qualifier, after winning three qualifying matches with the last a rematch against her Australian Open opponent Madison Brengle. There she reached the quarterfinals where she was defeated by Markéta Vondroušová. Shortly after the conclusion of this tournament marked the beginning of the Russian invasion of Ukraine. Yastremska was living with her family in Odesa, Ukraine at the time of the invasion and was able to seek refuge in France along with her 15-year-old sister Ivanna Yastremska. The two received a wildcard entry for the 2022 Lyon Open where Yastremska was able to reach her first final since 2020. However, she was defeated by Zhang Shuai, in three sets. She accepted a wildcard entry into the Indian Wells Open and was defeated by former world No. 4, Caroline Garcia, in the first round. Her "Sunshine Double" (Miami and Indian Wells Opens) concluded with a retirement in the first round of qualifying in the 2022 Miami Open. After reaching the quarterfinals of the 2022 Copa Colsanitas, she reentered the top 100 in the singles rankings.

She played as Ukraine's top seed in the Billie Jean King Cup qualifiers, in a tie against the United States. She defeated Jessica Pegula after having lost to Alison Riske in her first match of the qualifying tournament. Her clay-court season continued after the Copa Colsanitas by qualifying for the 2022 Madrid Open. She was defeated in the second round by Marie Bouzková.

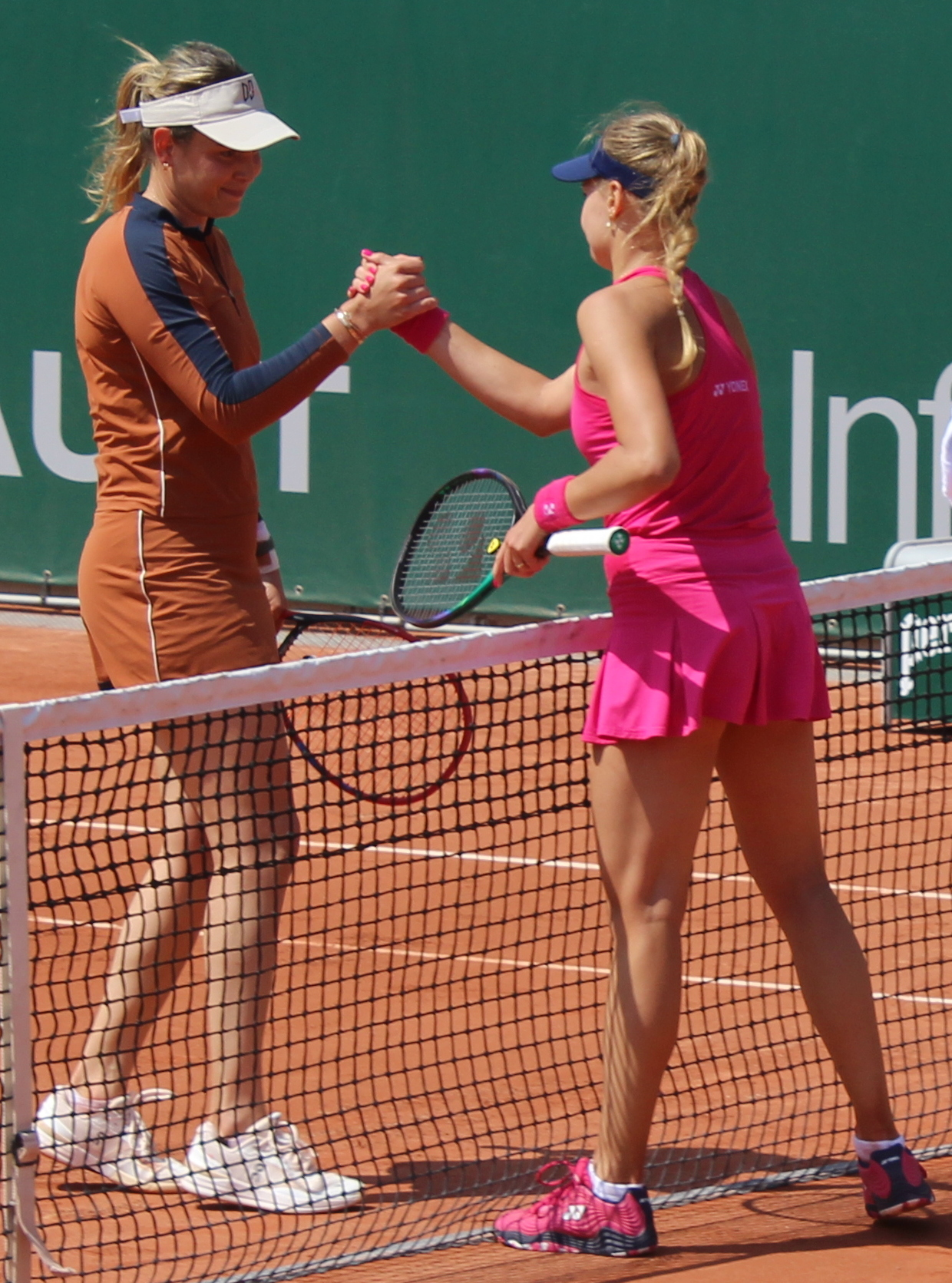
Yastremska at the 2023 French Open where she lost to Donna Vekić (left) in the first round

She won the title at the 2022 Poland Open, her maiden on the WTA 125 level, defeating Greet Minnen in the final.

=== 2024: Australian Open semifinal, top 30 ===
As the top seed in the qualifying competition, Yastremska made the main draw at the Australian Open, defeating local debutante Maya Joint in the last round of qualifying. She overcame seventh seed Markéta Vondroušová, Varvara Gracheva, 27th seed Emma Navarro and former Australian Open champion and 18th seed, Victoria Azarenka, to reach a major quarterfinal for the first time. It marked the first time multiple Ukrainian women have reached the quarterfinals at a major in the Open Era. She became just the second qualifier in the Open Era to defeat two former Grand Slam champions at a major since Jelena Dokic who upset Martina Hingis and Mary Pierce at Wimbledon in 1999. Next, she defeated Linda Nosková in straight sets to reach her first Grand Slam semifinal becoming the first qualifier in 46 years to reach the semifinals at this major since Christine Dorey at the AO 1978. She was also just the third Ukrainian after Elina Svitolina and Andrei Medvedev to reach this stage. In the last four Yastremska lost to Zheng Qinwen. As a result of her success at the event, she moved returned to the top 30 in the WTA rankings.

At the French Open, Yastremska made the third round as the 30th seed, defeating Ajla Tomljanović and Wang Yafan, before losing to 3rd seed Coco Gauff.

She reached the third round at Wimbledon where she lost to eventual semifinalist Donna Vekić. Yastremska represented Ukraine in both singles and women's doubles at the Paris Olympics. Seeded 32nd, she went out in the first round at the US Open, losing to Jule Niemeier in three sets.

=== 2025: Linz and Nottingham finals ===
As top seed, Yastremska defeated Katie Volynets and qualifier Ann Li to reach the quarterfinals at the Hobart International, where she lost to eventual champion McCartney Kessler.

At the Linz Open, Yastremska overcame Lucia Bronzetti, qualifier Antonia Ružić third seed Maria Sakkari and eighth seed Clara Tauson to make it through to her first WTA final since 2022. She lost the championship match to fourth seed Ekaterina Alexandrova in three sets.

Yastremska defeated ninth seed Olga Danilović, qualifier Antonia Ružić and seventh seed Leylah Fernandez to reach her first grass-court semifinal at the Nottingham Open, where she overcame sixth seed Magda Linette. She lost the final to McCartney Kessler, in straight sets. The following week at the Eastbourne Open, she recorded wins over fifth seed Magda Linette and wildcard entrant Francesca Jones to make it through to the quarterfinals, where her run was ended by qualifier Alexandra Eala.

At Wimbledon, Yastremska defeated second seed and reigning French Open champion Coco Gauff, in straight sets in the first round. She then overcame qualifier Anastasia Zakharova in a match that went to a final set tiebreak to reach the third round, where her run was ended by Jéssica Bouzas Maneiro.

Back on clay courts and seeded second at the Hamburg Open, Yastremska reached the semifinals with wins over Jule Niemeier, Diane Parry, and Dalma Gálfi. She lost in the last four to fifth seed Loïs Boisson.

Switching surfaces again, this time to hardcourt, and seeded 30th at the Canadian Open, she received a bye into the second round and then defeated Camila Osorio and eighth seed Emma Navarro to make it through to the fourth round, at which point she lost to ninth seed Elena Rybakina in three sets.

=== 2026: Second WTA 125 title ===
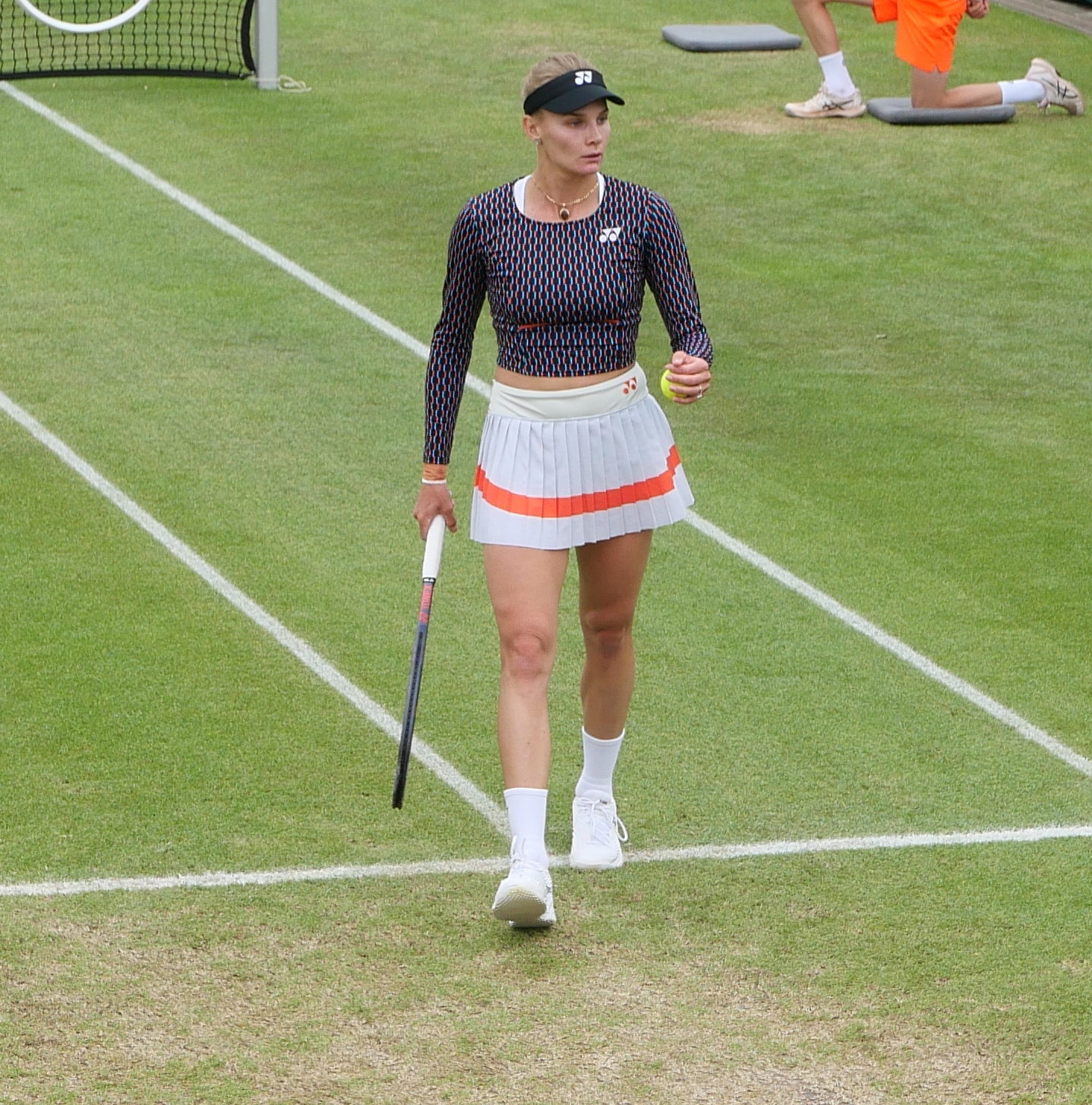
Yastresmka at the 2026 Libéma Open

Seeded 26th, Yastremska lost to Elena-Gabriela Ruse in the first round at the Australian Open. In May, she won her second WTA 125 singles title at the Emilia-Romagna Open in Parma, defeating Whitney Osuigwe, Hanne Vandewinkel, Solana Sierra, and Jéssica Bouzas Maneiro en route to the final, where she overcame Barbora Krejčíková in straight sets. Yastremska lost to 13th seed Jasmine Paolini in the first round at the French Open.

She defeated Aoi Ito at Wimbledon, before losing to Jéssica Bouzas Maneiro in the second round. At the US Open, Yastremska was eliminated in the first round by qualifier Lucrezia Stefanini. At the WTA 1000 China Open, she recorded wins over Caty McNally and 17th seed Maja Chwalińska to reach the third round, where she lost to Sinja Kraus.

== National representation ==
Yastremska made her debut for Ukraine Fed Cup team at the 2019 Fed Cup. The team was playing a tie against the host country Poland in a third-place play-off for Europe/Africa Zone Group I. Although Yastremska won the second singles rubber against Iga Świątek, Ukraine lost the tie after failing to win either the first singles rubber or the decisive doubles rubber, the latter of which ended in a third-set tiebreak.

== Playing style ==
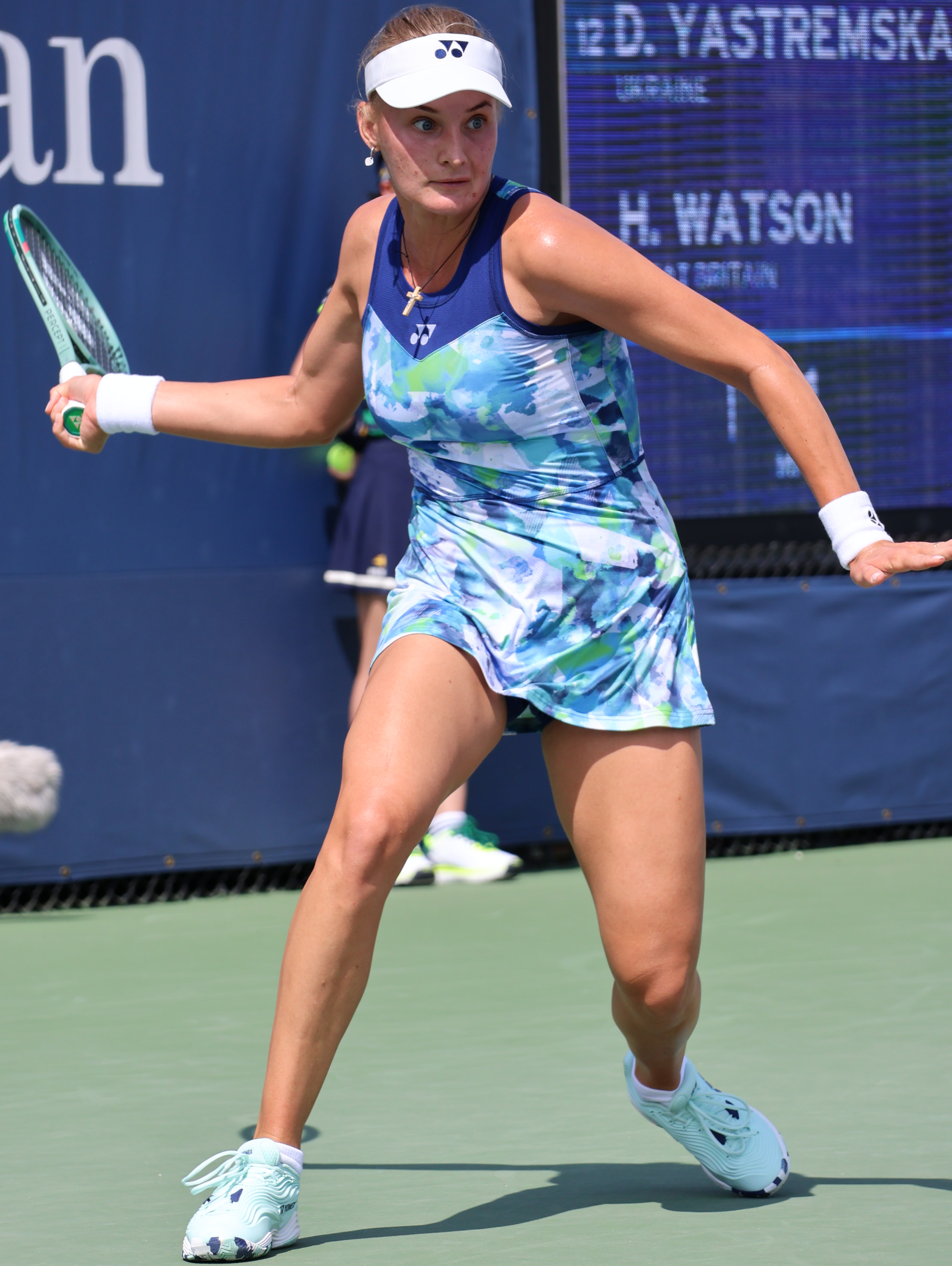
Yastremska swinging a forehand

Her former coach Sascha Bajin described Yastremska in the following terms: "She’s a great mover and she has incredible power. Her ground strokes are very powerful." Yastremska is an aggressive baseline player, whose attacking style allows her to hit a large number of winners - she hit 33 winners in her first two finals, and 49 winners when she won her third title. Her highly aggressive playing style also lends itself to a high unforced error count, with Yastremska hitting 21, 53, and 50 unforced errors in her three final matches. As of the 2019 Australian Open, Yastremska was ranked as the most aggressive player on the WTA Tour, having led the tour with 28.6 per cent of her shots ending in a winner, an unforced error, or an opponent's forced error; this statistic is known as the Aggression Score. Yastremska's groundstrokes are hit with relentless power, depth, and speed, with her forehand being her best shot, due to the extreme amount of racquet head speed she creates. She is capable of winning a high percentage of points when she hits an inside-in forehand in particular, and she can hit winners from any position of the court with her forehand. Despite this, Yastremska also possesses an incredibly powerful backhand, which is typically hit flat, allowing her to hit sharply angled winners. She can also strategically apply slice to her backhand, allowing her to break up the pace of rallies and construct points intelligently. Her average first serve speed is about 100 miles per hour (160 km/h), although her first serve speed can scale 116 mph (187 km/h), allowing her to serve numerous aces in any match. Although she ranked in the top 20 on the WTA Tour in aces in 2019, she also ranked in the top 10 in double faults, as she tends to take risks on her second serve.

== Coaches ==
Yastremska's parents have both been a part of her coaching team, with her mother continuing to serve as her mental coach. When Yastremska was a junior, she had a variety of different coaches. She worked with former top 100 player Viktoriya Kutuzova and Kutuzova's father Valery. She later worked for few months with another former top 100 player in Jean-René Lisnard, then with Bastien Fazincani, and then with the former world No. 2 Magnus Norman. As a professional in 2017, she has trained in Istanbul with Gavin Hopper, a former coach of Monica Seles. Yastremska later began training at the Justine Henin Academy, with Henin becoming her consultant in 2018. She worked with one of the academy's coaches, Oliver Jeunehomme, until September 2019. In the offseason, she hired Sascha Bajin as her new coach. In September 2020 they split after Yastremska had a disappointing performance in the 2020 US Open. She was then coached by Dorian Descloix after he split with Monica Puig in 2022.

As of June 2025, she was coached by Emmanuel Heussner at the Myteam Tennis Center near Nice, south of France with Marcis Garuts as her technical coach.

== Endorsements ==
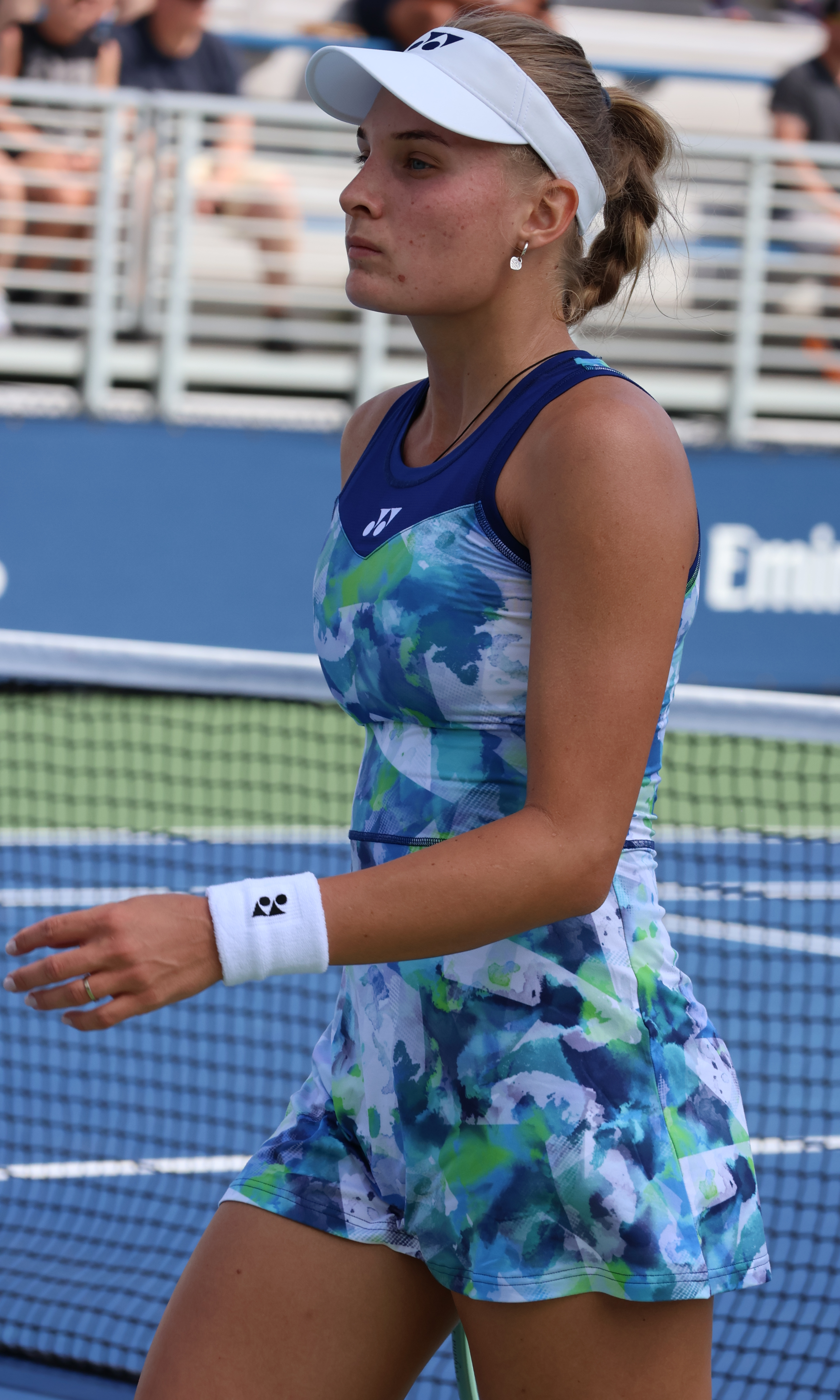
Yastremska sponsored by Yonex sportswear

Yastremska has endorsed Yonex for clothing, apparel, and rackets since 2019. She previously endorsed Nike.

== Personal life ==
At the 2019 Australian Open, Yastremska's mother suffered an eye injury after a champagne bottle that she was holding exploded unexpectedly. She had immediate surgery to save her eye, which was coordinated in part by Elina Svitolina's agent Stefan Gurov and financially covered by tournament director Craig Tiley. Yastremska dedicated her title at the Hua Hin Championships the following month to her mother as a result of this incident.

During the COVID-19 pandemic in 2020, Yastremska began a music career. She released her first single, "Thousands of Me", in May, and a dance song, "Favourite Track", in August.

On 9 July 2020, in the wake of the murder of George Floyd in Minneapolis, Minnesota, world-wide protests, and increased visibility of the Black Lives Matter movement, Yastremska posted four images of herself to her Twitter and Instagram accounts of her sporting half-white, half-black makeup, with the caption "Equality". Yastremska was widely criticised on social media, with many pointing out that her sporting blackface was antithetical to the message she was attempting to convey. Yastremska deleted the posts, and apologised "to those that [she had] offended", claiming that she had been "misunderstood", and denied that she was wearing blackface.

During the 2022 Russian invasion of Ukraine, Yastremska fled to France for safety, alongside her younger sister, Ivanna, on 26 February, being forced to leave her parents behind in her hometown of Odesa. In 2026, her family's apartment was destroyed in a Russian airstrike.

=== Accusations of gamesmanship ===
Yastremska has been accused of gamesmanship by commentators and fellow players, and for allegedly exaggerating and faking injuries to exploit the medical time-out system. One such player was former world No. 1, Caroline Wozniacki, following their second-round match at the 2020 Australian Open, where Yastremska took multiple medical time-outs throughout the match. Wozniacki stated in a post-match press conference that she "didn't think there was anything wrong" with Yastremska, and that "it's a trick she's done before, and [Wozniacki] knew it was coming", designed to "break [Wozniacki's] rhythm". She was widely criticised for doing so in the final at Hua Hin, as, trailing 5–2 in the third set against Ajla Tomljanović, she took three medical time-outs for a non-specific injury, rallying to win the third set, 7–6. Yastremska has denied the allegations that she fakes injuries to exploit the medical time-out system, claiming that she only takes medical time-outs when she feels she needs them.

== Career statistics ==
=== Grand Slam tournament performance timeline ===
==== Singles ====
Key
W	F	SF	QF	#R	RR	Q#	DNQ	A	NH

(W) winner; (F) finalist; (SF) semifinalist; (QF) quarterfinalist; (#R) rounds 4, 3, 2, 1; (RR) round-robin stage; (Q#) qualification round; (DNQ) did not qualify; (A) absent; (NH) not held; (SR) strike rate (events won / competed); (W–L) win–loss record.
To avoid confusion and double counting, these charts are updated at the conclusion of a tournament or when the player's participation has ended.

Tournament	2018	2019	2020	2021	2022	2023	2024	2025	2026	SR	W–L	Win %
Australian Open	Q2	3R	2R	A	1R	1R	SF	3R	1R	0 / 7	10–7	59%
French Open	A	1R	1R	A	1R	1R	3R	3R	1R	0 / 7	4–7	36%
Wimbledon	Q2	4R	NH	A	1R	Q3	3R	3R	2R	0 / 4	7–4	64%
US Open	1R	3R	2R	1R	1R	Q3	1R	1R	1R	0 / 7	3–7	30%
Win–loss	0–1	7–4	2–3	0–1	0–4	0–2	9–4	6–4	0–2	0 / 25	24–25	49%
