= 2021 US Open (tennis) =

2021 tennis tournament held in New York, U.S.

- Date: August 30 – September 12
- Edition: 141st
- Category: Grand Slam (ITF)
- Draw: 128S/64D/32X
- Prize money: US$57.5 million
- Surface: Hard
- Location: New York City, United States
- Venue: USTA Billie Jean King National Tennis Center

Champions

Men's singles
- (Russia) Daniil Medvedev

Women's singles
- (United Kingdom) Emma Raducanu

Men's doubles
- (United States) Rajeev Ram / (United Kingdom) Joe Salisbury

Women's doubles
- (Australia) Samantha Stosur / (China) Zhang Shuai

Mixed doubles
- (United States) Desirae Krawczyk / (United Kingdom) Joe Salisbury

Wheelchair men's singles
- (Japan) Shingo Kunieda

Wheelchair women's singles
- (Netherlands) Diede de Groot

Wheelchair quad singles
- (Australia) Dylan Alcott

Wheelchair men's doubles
- (United Kingdom) Alfie Hewett / (United Kingdom) Gordon Reid

Wheelchair women's doubles
- (Netherlands) Diede de Groot / (Netherlands) Aniek van Koot

Wheelchair quad doubles
- (Netherlands) Sam Schröder / (Netherlands) Niels Vink

Boys' singles
- (Spain) Daniel Rincón

Girls' singles
- (United States) Robin Montgomery

Boys' doubles
- (France) Max Westphal / (Hong Kong) Coleman Wong

Girls' doubles
- (United States) Ashlyn Krueger / (United States) Robin Montgomery
← 2020 ·	US Open	· 2022 →

The 2021 US Open was the 141st edition of tennis's US Open and the fourth and final Grand Slam event of the year. It was held on outdoor hardcourts at the USTA Billie Jean King National Tennis Center in Flushing Meadows, New York City.

Daniil Medvedev won the men's singles title. Emma Raducanu won the women's singles title, becoming the first qualifier, male or female, to reach a major final and win a major title.

Dominic Thiem and Naomi Osaka were the men's and women's singles defending champions. However, Thiem withdrew from the tournament due to a wrist injury causing him to end his season early. Osaka lost in the third round to eventual finalist Leylah Fernandez.

Both Dylan Alcott and Diede de Groot achieved the Golden Slam in wheelchair quad singles and wheelchair women's singles, respectively, by winning all four majors and the Paralympics in 2021. Alfie Hewett and Gordon Reid also achieved the Grand Slam in wheelchair men's doubles by winning all four majors in 2021. Novak Djokovic was attempting to be the first man to complete a calendar Grand Slam in men's singles since Rod Laver in 1969, having won the men's singles tournaments at the 2021 Australian Open, French Open and Wimbledon, but unlike Alcott and de Groot, who also won the Olympic gold medal (Djokovic lost to Alexander Zverev in the semifinal for the gold medal match at the Olympics in 2021), he lost to Medvedev in the final.

This was the first Major tournament since the 1997 Australian Open not to feature Roger Federer, Rafael Nadal, Serena Williams, or Venus Williams in the main singles draw.

The United States Tennis Association allowed the return of spectators after the 2020 tournament was held behind closed doors due to the COVID-19 pandemic in New York. Due to a surge in COVID-19 cases resulting from the delta variant of the virus, spectators had to present a negative COVID-19 test or proof of vaccination in order to be allowed to enter the grounds.

== Tournament ==
The 2021 US Open was the 141st edition of the tournament and took place at the USTA Billie Jean King National Tennis Center in Flushing Meadows–Corona Park of Queens in New York City, United States.

The tournament was an event run by the International Tennis Federation (ITF) and part of the 2021 ATP Tour and the 2021 WTA Tour calendars under the Grand Slam category. The tournament consisted of both men's and women's singles and doubles draws, as both doubles draws returned to the standard 64 players, and singles players remained in standard 128-person format in each category. There were also singles and doubles events for both boys and girls (players under 18).

The tournament was played on hard courts and took place over a series of 17 courts with Laykold surface, including the three existing main showcourts—Arthur Ashe Stadium, Louis Armstrong Stadium and Grandstand.

Wheelchair events were held on September 9 as scheduled. Unlike previous events on scheduling conflicts with the tournament and the Summer Paralympic Games, the 2020 Summer Paralympics (which was delayed from 2020 due to the pandemic) were held during the first week of the tournament.

== Singles players ==
Men's singles

Champion		Runner-up	
(Russia) Daniil Medvedev [2]		(Serbia) Novak Djokovic [1]	
Semifinals out
(Germany) Alexander Zverev [4]		(Canada) Félix Auger-Aliassime [12]	
Quarterfinals out
(Italy) Matteo Berrettini [6]	(South Africa) Lloyd Harris	(Spain) Carlos Alcaraz	(Netherlands) Botic van de Zandschulp (Q)
4th round out
(United States) Jenson Brooksby (WC)	(Germany) Oscar Otte (Q)	(Italy) Jannik Sinner [13]	(United States) Reilly Opelka [22]
(United States) Frances Tiafoe	(Germany) Peter Gojowczyk (Q)	(Argentina) Diego Schwartzman [11]	(United Kingdom) Dan Evans [24]
3rd round out
(Japan) Kei Nishikori	(Russia) Aslan Karatsev [21]	(Italy) Andreas Seppi	(Belarus) Ilya Ivashka
(United States) Jack Sock (WC)	(France) Gaël Monfils [17]	(Georgia (country)) Nikoloz Basilashvili	(Canada) Denis Shapovalov [7]
(Russia) Andrey Rublev [5]	(Spain) Roberto Bautista Agut [18]	(Switzerland) Henri Laaksonen (Q)	(Greece) Stefanos Tsitsipas [3]
(Argentina) Facundo Bagnis	(Slovakia) Alex Molčan (Q)	(Australia) Alexei Popyrin	(Spain) Pablo Andújar
2nd round out
(Netherlands) Tallon Griekspoor	(United States) Mackenzie McDonald	(Australia) Jordan Thompson	(United States) Taylor Fritz
(Poland) Hubert Hurkacz [10]	(United States) Denis Kudla	(Canada) Vasek Pospisil	(France) Corentin Moutet
(Spain) Albert Ramos Viñolas	(Kazakhstan) Alexander Bublik [31]	(United States) Steve Johnson	(United States) Zachary Svajda (WC)
(United States) Maxime Cressy (Q)	(Italy) Lorenzo Musetti	(United States) Ernesto Escobedo (WC)	(Spain) Roberto Carballés Baena
(Spain) Pedro Martínez	(Argentina) Guido Pella	(Finland) Emil Ruusuvuori	(Spain) Bernabé Zapata Miralles (LL)
(Chile) Cristian Garín [16]	(Serbia) Dušan Lajović	(France) Arthur Rinderknech	(France) Adrian Mannarino
(Norway) Casper Ruud [8]	(Argentina) Marco Trungelliti (Q)	(United States) Brandon Nakashima (WC)	(South Africa) Kevin Anderson
(Bulgaria) Grigor Dimitrov [15]	(United States) Marcos Giron	(Germany) Philipp Kohlschreiber (PR)	(Germany) Dominik Koepfer
1st round out
(Denmark) Holger Rune (Q)	(Germany) Jan-Lennard Struff	(Italy) Salvatore Caruso	(Belgium) David Goffin [27]
(Spain) Jaume Munar	(Italy) Gianluca Mager	(Sweden) Mikael Ymer	(Australia) Alex de Minaur [14]
(Belarus) Egor Gerasimov	(Hungary) Márton Fucsovics	(Serbia) Laslo Đere	(Italy) Lorenzo Sonego [20]
(Italy) Fabio Fognini [28]	(United States) Tennys Sandgren	(Italy) Stefano Travaglia	(France) Jérémy Chardy
(United States) Sam Querrey	(France) Lucas Pouille	(Japan) Yoshihito Nishioka	(Germany) Yannick Hanfmann
(Argentina) Federico Coria	(Germany) Maximilian Marterer (Q)	(Italy) Marco Cecchinato	(Australia) Max Purcell (WC)
(Spain) Pablo Carreño Busta [9]	(United States) Sebastian Korda	(United States) Emilio Nava (WC)	(South Korea) Kwon Soon-woo
(Russia) Karen Khachanov [25]	(Uruguay) Pablo Cuevas	(United States) Tommy Paul	(Argentina) Federico Delbonis
(Croatia) Ivo Karlović (Q)	(Australia) James Duckworth	(United States) Christopher Eubanks (Q)	(Serbia) Filip Krajinović [32]
(Australia) Nick Kyrgios	(Poland) Kamil Majchrzak (Q)	(Spain) Feliciano López	(Russia) Evgeny Donskoy (Q)
(Slovakia) Norbert Gombos	(Australia) John Millman	(France) Benoît Paire	(France) Ugo Humbert [23]
(United Kingdom) Cameron Norrie [28]	(Serbia) Miomir Kecmanović	(France) Pierre-Hugues Herbert	(United Kingdom) Andy Murray
(Japan) Yūichi Sugita (LL)	(Spain) Carlos Taberner	(Japan) Taro Daniel	(Spain) Alejandro Davidovich Fokina [29]
(United States) John Isner [19]	(Turkey) Cem İlkel (Q)	(Czech Republic) Jiří Veselý	(Lithuania) Ričardas Berankis
(United States) Sam Riffice (WC)	(Moldova) Radu Albot	(France) Antoine Hoang (Q)	(Brazil) Thiago Monteiro
(Croatia) Marin Čilić [30]	(Kazakhstan) Mikhail Kukushkin (LL)	(France) Quentin Halys (Q)	(France) Richard Gasquet

Women's singles

Champion		Runner-up	
(United Kingdom) Emma Raducanu (Q)		(Canada) Leylah Fernandez	
Semifinals out
(Greece) Maria Sakkari [17]		(Belarus) Aryna Sabalenka [2]	
Quarterfinals out
(Switzerland) Belinda Bencic [11]	(Czech Republic) Karolína Plíšková [4]	(Ukraine) Elina Svitolina [5]	(Czech Republic) Barbora Krejčíková [8]
4th round out
(United States) Shelby Rogers	(Poland) Iga Świątek [7]	(Russia) Anastasia Pavlyuchenkova [14]	(Canada) Bianca Andreescu [6]
(Romania) Simona Halep [12]	(Germany) Angelique Kerber [16]	(Spain) Garbiñe Muguruza [9]	(Belgium) Elise Mertens [15]
3rd round out
(Australia) Ashleigh Barty [1]	(Spain) Sara Sorribes Tormo	(United States) Jessica Pegula [23]	(Estonia) Anett Kontaveit [28]
(Australia) Ajla Tomljanović	(Russia) Varvara Gracheva	(Czech Republic) Petra Kvitová [10]	(Belgium) Greet Minnen (LL)
(Russia) Daria Kasatkina [25]	(Kazakhstan) Elena Rybakina [19]	(United States) Sloane Stephens	(Japan) Naomi Osaka [3]
(Russia) Kamilla Rakhimova (LL)	(Belarus) Victoria Azarenka [18]	(Tunisia) Ons Jabeur [20]	(United States) Danielle Collins [26]
2nd round out
(Denmark) Clara Tauson	(Romania) Sorana Cîrstea	(Chinese Taipei) Hsieh Su-wei	(China) Zhang Shuai
(Italy) Martina Trevisan	(Japan) Misaki Doi	(Switzerland) Jil Teichmann	(France) Fiona Ferro
(United States) Amanda Anisimova	(Croatia) Petra Martić [30]	(Spain) Paula Badosa [24]	(Slovakia) Anna Karolína Schmiedlová (Q)
(Czech Republic) Kristýna Plíšková (Q)	(Czech Republic) Kateřina Siniaková	(Russia) Liudmila Samsonova	(United States) Lauren Davis
(Spain) Rebeka Masarova (Q)	(Czech Republic) Markéta Vondroušová	(France) Caroline Garcia	(Slovakia) Kristína Kučová (LL)
(Ukraine) Anhelina Kalinina	(United States) Coco Gauff [21]	(Estonia) Kaia Kanepi	(Serbia) Olga Danilović (Q)
(United States) Christina McHale	(Russia) Ekaterina Alexandrova [32]	(Italy) Jasmine Paolini	(Germany) Andrea Petkovic
(Greece) Valentini Grammatikopoulou (Q)	(Colombia) Camila Osorio	(Slovenia) Kaja Juvan	(Slovenia) Tamara Zidanšek
1st round out
(Russia) Vera Zvonareva	(France) Clara Burel	(United States) Madison Brengle	(Russia) Veronika Kudermetova [29]
(Czech Republic) Karolína Muchová [22]	(United States) Claire Liu	(United States) Hailey Baptiste (WC)	(Switzerland) Stefanie Vögele (LL)
(Netherlands) Arantxa Rus	(United States) CoCo Vandeweghe (WC)	(Australia) Storm Sanders (WC)	(Russia) Anastasia Potapova
(Australia) Samantha Stosur (PR)	(Spain) Cristina Bucșa (Q)	(Japan) Nao Hibino	(United States) Jamie Loeb (Q)
(United States) Caty McNally (WC)	(Kazakhstan) Zarina Diyas	(United States) Katie Volynets (WC)	(Hungary) Dalma Gálfi (Q)
(Belgium) Alison Van Uytvanck	(Spain) Nuria Párrizas Díaz (Q)	(United States) Ashlyn Krueger (WC)	(United States) Alison Riske
(Slovenia) Polona Hercog	(Montenegro) Danka Kovinić	(Latvia) Anastasija Sevastova	(Ukraine) Marta Kostyuk
(Argentina) Nadia Podoroska	(United Kingdom) Katie Boulter (Q)	(Bulgaria) Viktoriya Tomova (LL)	(Switzerland) Viktorija Golubic
(Canada) Rebecca Marino (Q)	(Romania) Ana Bogdan	(Romania) Elena-Gabriela Ruse (Q)	(Bulgaria) Tsvetana Pironkova
(Belarus) Aliaksandra Sasnovich	(United Kingdom) Harriet Dart (Q)	(United States) Ann Li	(Italy) Camila Giorgi
(Ukraine) Dayana Yastremska	(Egypt) Mayar Sherif (LL)	(United States) Madison Keys	(Poland) Magda Linette
(Kazakhstan) Yulia Putintseva [31]	(Croatia) Ana Konjuh (Q)	(United States) Alycia Parks (WC)	(Czech Republic) Marie Bouzková
(Australia) Astra Sharma (Q)	(United States) Emma Navarro (WC)	(France) Kristina Mladenovic	(Italy) Sara Errani
(Czech Republic) Tereza Martincová	(Kazakhstan) Yaroslava Shvedova (PR)	(Romania) Irina-Camelia Begu	(Croatia) Donna Vekić
(Sweden) Rebecca Peterson	(Russia) Anna Blinkova	(Serbia) Ivana Jorović (PR)	(France) Alizé Cornet
(Spain) Carla Suárez Navarro (PR)	(United Kingdom) Heather Watson	(United States) Bernarda Pera	(Serbia) Nina Stojanović

== Events ==
=== Men's singles ===
- (Russia) Daniil Medvedev def. (Serbia) Novak Djokovic, 6–4, 6–4, 6–4

=== Women's singles ===
- (United Kingdom) Emma Raducanu def. (Canada) Leylah Fernandez, 6–4, 6–3

=== Men's doubles ===
- (United States) Rajeev Ram / (United Kingdom) Joe Salisbury def. (United Kingdom) Jamie Murray / (Brazil) Bruno Soares, 3–6, 6–2, 6–2

=== Women's doubles ===
- (Australia) Samantha Stosur / (China) Zhang Shuai def. (United States) Coco Gauff / (United States) Caty McNally, 6–3, 3–6, 6–3

=== Mixed doubles ===
- (United States) Desirae Krawczyk / (United Kingdom) Joe Salisbury def. (Mexico) Giuliana Olmos / (El Salvador) Marcelo Arévalo, 7–5, 6–2

=== Wheelchair men's singles ===
- (Japan) Shingo Kunieda def. (United Kingdom) Alfie Hewett, 6–1, 6–4

=== Wheelchair women's singles ===
- (Netherlands) Diede de Groot def. (Japan) Yui Kamiji, 6–3, 6–2

=== Wheelchair quad singles ===
- (Australia) Dylan Alcott def. (Netherlands) Niels Vink, 7–5, 6–2

=== Wheelchair men's doubles ===
- (United Kingdom) Alfie Hewett / (United Kingdom) Gordon Reid def. (Argentina) Gustavo Fernández / (Japan) Shingo Kunieda, 6–2, 6–1

=== Wheelchair women's doubles ===
- (Netherlands) Diede de Groot / (Netherlands) Aniek van Koot def. (Japan) Yui Kamiji / (United Kingdom) Jordanne Whiley, 6–1, 6–2

=== Wheelchair quad doubles ===
- (Netherlands) Sam Schröder / (Netherlands) Niels Vink def. (Australia) Dylan Alcott / (Australia) Heath Davidson, 6–3, 6–2

=== Boys' singles ===
- (Spain) Daniel Rincón def. (China) Shang Juncheng, 6–2, 7–6^{(8–6)}

=== Girls' singles ===
- (United States) Robin Montgomery def. (Belarus) Kristina Dmitruk, 6–2, 6–4

=== Boys' doubles ===
- (France) Max Westphal / (Hong Kong) Coleman Wong def. (Ukraine) Viacheslav Bielinskyi / (Bulgaria) Petr Nesterov, 6–3, 5–7, [10–1]

=== Girls' doubles ===
- (United States) Ashlyn Krueger / (United States) Robin Montgomery def. (United States) Reese Brantmeier / (United States) Elvina Kalieva, 5–7, 6–3, [10–4]

== Point and prize money distribution ==
=== Point distribution ===
Below is a series of tables for each of the competitions showing the ranking points on offer for each event.

==== Senior ====
Event	W	F	SF	QF	R4	R3	R2	R1	Q	Q3	Q2	Q1
Men's singles	2000	1200	720	360	180	90	45	10	25	16	8	0
Men's doubles	2000	1200	720	360	180	90	0	—	—	—	—	—
Women's singles	2000	1300	780	430	240	130	70	10	40	30	20	2
Women's doubles	2000	1300	780	430	240	130	10	—	—	—	—	—

==== Wheelchair ====
Event	W	F	SF/3rd	QF/4th
Singles	800	500	375	100
Doubles	800	500	100	—
Quad singles	800	500	375	100
Quad doubles	800	100	—	—

==== Junior ====
Event	W	F	SF	QF	Round of 16	Round of 32	Q	Q3
Boys' singles	1000	600	370	200	100	45	30	20
Girls' singles	1000	600	370	200	100	45	30	20
Boys' doubles	750	450	275	150	75	—	—	—
Girls' doubles	750	450	275	150	75	—	—	—

==== Prize money ====
The US Open has the richest prize purse of all Grand Slams. The total prize money compensation for the 2021 US Open is $57.5 million.

Event	W	F	SF	QF	Round of 16	Round of 32	Round of 64	Round of 128	Q3	Q2	Q1
Singles	$2,500,000	$1,250,000	$675,000	$425,000	$265,000	$180,000	$115,000	$75,000	$42,000	$32,000	$20,000
Doubles	$660,000	$330,000	$164,000	$93,000	$54,000	$34,000	$20,000	N/A	N/A	N/A	N/A
Mixed doubles	$160,000	$78,000	$40,000	$22,000	$13,400	$7,800	N/A	N/A	N/A	N/A	N/A

Preceded by 2021 Wimbledon Championships	Grand Slams	Succeeded by 2022 Australian Open
