= 2021 US Open – Women's singles =

Tennis tournament

Women's singles
- 2021 US Open

Final
- Champion: (United Kingdom) Emma Raducanu
- Runner-up: (Canada) Leylah Fernandez
- Score: 6–4, 6–3

Details
- Draw: 128 (16Q / 8WC)
- Seeds: 32

Events
Singles	men	women		boys	girls
Doubles	men	women	mixed	boys	girls
WC Singles	men	women	quad
WC Doubles	men	women	quad
Legends	men	women	mixed
- US Open

Emma Raducanu defeated Leylah Fernandez in the final, 6–4, 6–3 to win the women's singles tennis title at the 2021 US Open. It was her first major title. Raducanu became the first qualifier to win a major. She was the first British woman to win a singles major since Virginia Wade at the 1977 Wimbledon Championships, and the second player to win the US Open on her tournament debut (after Bianca Andreescu in 2019). Aged 18, Raducanu was the youngest major champion since Maria Sharapova at the 2004 Wimbledon Championships, and with a ranking of world No. 150, the lowest-ranked player to win a major since Kim Clijsters at the 2009 US Open. She did not lose a set during the tournament, including during her three qualification matches, and was not taken to a tiebreak in any set, and the total number of games won by her opponents in the main draw was only 34, an average of less than 2.5 games per set. It was her first WTA Tour-level singles title, making her the fourth woman in the Open Era to win a major as her first singles title. Raducanu won the title on only her second major main-draw appearance, an Open Era record.

Naomi Osaka was the defending champion, but was defeated by Fernandez in the third round.

The final marked the first all-teenage major final since Serena Williams defeated Martina Hingis at the 1999 US Open, and the first women's singles major final in the Open Era to feature two unseeded players. Raducanu and Fernandez both made their top 30 debuts following the tournament. Fernandez was the youngest player to defeat three top-five seeded players in the same major since Williams at the 1999 US Open. She was the first player of Southeast Asian descent (Filipino) to reach the final.

This was the first major since the 2011 French Open and first US Open since 2003 where neither of the Williams sisters participated.

None of the top 20 seeds lost prior to the third round, the first time this occurred since the introduction of the 32-seed format in 2001. The defeats of Karolína Plíšková and Barbora Krejčíková in the quarterfinals guaranteed two first-time major finalists; Raducanu and Fernandez emerged to become those players. This also ensured that, for the first time since 2014, eight different players contested the four major finals in a season.

This marked the final US Open appearance of 2016 champion and former world No. 1 Angelique Kerber; she lost to Fernandez in the fourth round. Kerber subsequently went on maternity leave in 2023 and retired from professional tennis in 2024.

== Seeds ==
1. (Australia) Ashleigh Barty (third round)
2. (Belarus) Aryna Sabalenka (semifinals)
3. (Japan) Naomi Osaka (third round)
4. (Czech Republic) Karolína Plíšková (quarterfinals)
5. (Ukraine) Elina Svitolina (quarterfinals)
6. (Canada) Bianca Andreescu (fourth round)
7. (Poland) Iga Świątek (fourth round)
8. (Czech Republic) Barbora Krejčíková (quarterfinals)
9. (Spain) Garbiñe Muguruza (fourth round)
10. (Czech Republic) Petra Kvitová (third round)
11. (Switzerland) Belinda Bencic (quarterfinals)
12. (Romania) Simona Halep (fourth round)
13. (United States) Jennifer Brady (withdrew)
14. (Russia) Anastasia Pavlyuchenkova (fourth round)
15. (Belgium) Elise Mertens (fourth round)
16. (Germany) Angelique Kerber (fourth round)
17. (Greece) Maria Sakkari (semifinals)
18. (Belarus) Victoria Azarenka (third round)
19. (Kazakhstan) Elena Rybakina (third round)
20. (Tunisia) Ons Jabeur (third round)
21. (United States) Coco Gauff (second round)
22. (Czech Republic) Karolína Muchová (first round)
23. (United States) Jessica Pegula (third round)
24. (Spain) Paula Badosa (second round)
25. (Russia) Daria Kasatkina (third round)
26. (United States) Danielle Collins (third round)
27. (Latvia) Jeļena Ostapenko (withdrew)
28. (Estonia) Anett Kontaveit (third round)
29. (Russia) Veronika Kudermetova (first round)
30. (Croatia) Petra Martić (second round)
31. (Kazakhstan) Yulia Putintseva (first round)
32. (Russia) Ekaterina Alexandrova (second round)

Click on the seed number of a player to go to their draw section.

== Draw ==
Key

- Q = Qualifier
- WC = Wild card
- LL = Lucky loser
- Alt = Alternate
- ITF = ITF entry
- PR = Protected ranking
- SR = Special ranking
- SE = Special exempt
- JE = Junior exempt
- JR = Junior Accelerator Programme entrant
- CO = College Accelerator Programme entrant
- NG = Next Gen Accelerator Program entrant
- w/o = Walkover
- r = Retired
- d = Defaulted

=== Finals ===
Quarterfinals
Q	(United Kingdom) Emma Raducanu	6	6
11	(Switzerland) Belinda Bencic	3	4
4	(Czech Republic) Karolína Plíšková	4	4
17	(Greece) Maria Sakkari	6	6
5	(Ukraine) Elina Svitolina	3	6	6^{5}
(Canada) Leylah Fernandez	6	3	7^{7}
8	(Czech Republic) Barbora Krejčíková	1	4
2	(Belarus) Aryna Sabalenka	6	6

Semifinals
Q	(United Kingdom) Emma Raducanu	6	6
17	(Greece) Maria Sakkari	1	4
(Canada) Leylah Fernandez	7^{7}	4	6
2	(Belarus) Aryna Sabalenka	6^{3}	6	4

Final
Q	(United Kingdom) Emma Raducanu	6	6
(Canada) Leylah Fernandez	4	3

=== Top half ===
==== Section 1 ====
First round
1	(Australia) A Barty	6	7^{9}
(Russia) V Zvonareva	1	6^{7}
(France) C Burel	5	0
(Denmark) C Tauson	7	6
(United States) S Rogers	6	6
(United States) M Brengle	4	0
(Romania) S Cîrstea	7^{7}	3	6
29	(Russia) V Kudermetova	6^{5}	6	0
22	(Czech Republic) K Muchová	2	6^{3}
(Spain) S Sorribes Tormo	6	7^{7}
(Chinese Taipei) S-w Hsieh	6	6
(United States) C Liu	1	4
WC	(United States) H Baptiste	3	4
(China) S Zhang	6	6
Q	(United Kingdom) E Raducanu	6	6
LL	(Switzerland) S Vögele	2	3

Second round
1	(Australia) A Barty	6	7
(Denmark) C Tauson	1	5
(United States) S Rogers	7	6
(Romania) S Cîrstea	5	2
(Spain) S Sorribes Tormo	6	6
(Chinese Taipei) S-w Hsieh	1	3
(China) S Zhang	2	4
Q	(United Kingdom) E Raducanu	6	6

Third round
1	(Australia) A Barty	2	6	6^{5}
(United States) S Rogers	6	1	7^{7}
(Spain) S Sorribes Tormo	0	1
Q	(United Kingdom) E Raducanu	6	6

Fourth round
(United States) S Rogers	2	1
Q	(United Kingdom) E Raducanu	6	6

==== Section 2 ====
First round
11	(Switzerland) B Bencic	6	6
(Netherlands) A Rus	4	4
(Italy) M Trevisan	6	7
WC	(United States) C Vandeweghe	1	5
(Japan) M Doi	7^{7}	6
WC	(Australia) S Sanders	6^{3}	3
(Russia) A Potapova	2	2
23	(United States) J Pegula	6	6
28	(Estonia) A Kontaveit	6	6
PR	(Australia) S Stosur	3	0
Q	(Spain) C Bucșa	3	4
(Switzerland) J Teichmann	6	6
(France) F Ferro	6	6
(Japan) N Hibino	1	4
Q	(United States) J Loeb	3	4
7	(Poland) I Świątek	6	6

Second round
11	(Switzerland) B Bencic	6	6
(Italy) M Trevisan	3	1
(Japan) M Doi	3	2
23	(United States) J Pegula	6	6
28	(Estonia) A Kontaveit	6	6
(Switzerland) J Teichmann	4	1
(France) F Ferro	6	6^{3}	0
7	(Poland) I Świątek	3	7^{7}	6

Third round
11	(Switzerland) B Bencic	6	6
23	(United States) J Pegula	2	4
28	(Estonia) A Kontaveit	3	6	3
7	(Poland) I Świątek	6	4	6

Fourth round
11	(Switzerland) B Bencic	7^{14}	6
7	(Poland) I Świątek	6^{12}	3

==== Section 3 ====
First round
4	(Czech Republic) Ka Plíšková	6	6
WC	(United States) C McNally	3	4
(Kazakhstan) Z Diyas	5	2
(United States) A Anisimova	7	6
(Australia) A Tomljanović	6	6
WC	(United States) K Volynets	3	1
Q	(Hungary) D Gálfi	3	2
30	(Croatia) P Martić	6	6
24	(Spain) P Badosa	6	6
(Belgium) A Van Uytvanck	4	3
(Russia) V Gracheva	5	6	6
Q	(Spain) N Párrizas Díaz	7	0	2
Q	(Slovakia) AK Schmiedlová	7	6^{3}	6
WC	(United States) A Krueger	5	7^{7}	3
(United States) A Riske	4	2
14	(Russia) A Pavlyuchenkova	6	6

Second round
4	(Czech Republic) Ka Plíšková	7	6^{5}	7^{9}
(United States) A Anisimova	5	7^{7}	6^{7}
(Australia) A Tomljanović	7^{8}	6
30	(Croatia) P Martić	6^{6}	4
24	(Spain) P Badosa	4	4
(Russia) V Gracheva	6	6
Q	(Slovakia) AK Schmiedlová	2	7	2
14	(Russia) A Pavlyuchenkova	6	5	6

Third round
4	(Czech Republic) Ka Plíšková	6	6
(Australia) A Tomljanović	3	2
(Russia) V Gracheva	1	4
14	(Russia) A Pavlyuchenkova	6	6

Fourth round
4	(Czech Republic) Ka Plíšková	7	6
14	(Russia) A Pavlyuchenkova	5	4

==== Section 4 ====
First round
10	(Czech Republic) P Kvitová	6	6
(Slovenia) P Hercog	1	2
(Montenegro) D Kovinić	4	3
Q	(Czech Republic) Kr Plíšková	6	6
(Latvia) A Sevastova	6^{6}	3
(Czech Republic) K Siniaková	7^{8}	6
(Ukraine) M Kostyuk	4	3
17	(Greece) M Sakkari	6	6
LL	(Belgium) G Minnen	6	1	6
(Argentina) N Podoroska	4	6	3
(Russia) L Samsonova	6	6
Q	(United Kingdom) K Boulter	3	2
(United States) L Davis	6	2	6
LL	(Bulgaria) V Tomova	2	6	3
(Switzerland) V Golubic	5	6	5
6	(Canada) B Andreescu	7	4	7

Second round
10	(Czech Republic) P Kvitová	7^{7}	6
Q	(Czech Republic) Kr Plíšková	6^{4}	2
(Czech Republic) K Siniaková	4	2
17	(Greece) M Sakkari	6	6
LL	(Belgium) G Minnen	6	6
(Russia) L Samsonova	4	4
(United States) L Davis	4	4
6	(Canada) B Andreescu	6	6

Third round
10	(Czech Republic) P Kvitová	4	3
17	(Greece) M Sakkari	6	6
LL	(Belgium) G Minnen	1	2
6	(Canada) B Andreescu	6	6

Fourth round
17	(Greece) M Sakkari	6^{2}	7^{8}	6
6	(Canada) B Andreescu	7^{7}	6^{6}	3

=== Bottom half ===
==== Section 5 ====
First round
5	(Ukraine) E Svitolina	6	6
Q	(Canada) R Marino	2	3
Q	(Spain) R Masarova	6^{9}	7^{7}	7^{11}
(Romania) A Bogdan	7^{11}	6^{2}	6^{9}
(Czech Republic) M Vondroušová	7	6
Q	(Romania) E-G Ruse	5	0
(Bulgaria) T Pironkova	2	1
25	(Russia) D Kasatkina	6	6
19	(Kazakhstan) E Rybakina	6	6
(Belarus) A Sasnovich	2	3
(France) C Garcia	6^{6}	6	6
Q	(United Kingdom) H Dart	7^{8}	4	2
(United States) A Li	5	1
LL	(Slovakia) K Kučová	7	6
(Italy) C Giorgi	4	6^{3}
12	(Romania) S Halep	6	7^{7}

Second round
5	(Ukraine) E Svitolina	6	7
Q	(Spain) R Masarova	2	5
(Czech Republic) M Vondroušová	6	4	4
25	(Russia) D Kasatkina	3	6	6
19	(Kazakhstan) E Rybakina	6	6
(France) C Garcia	1	4
LL	(Slovakia) K Kučová	3	1
12	(Romania) S Halep	6	6

Third round
5	(Ukraine) E Svitolina	6	6
25	(Russia) D Kasatkina	4	2
19	(Kazakhstan) E Rybakina	6^{11}	6	3
12	(Romania) S Halep	7^{13}	4	6

Fourth round
5	(Ukraine) E Svitolina	6	6
12	(Romania) S Halep	3	3

==== Section 6 ====
First round
16	(Germany) A Kerber	3	6	7^{7}
(Ukraine) D Yastremska	6	4	6^{3}
LL	(Egypt) M Sherif	6	1	1
(Ukraine) A Kalinina	4	6	6
(United States) M Keys	3	6	6^{7}
(United States) S Stephens	6	1	7^{9}
(Poland) M Linette	7	3	4
21	(United States) C Gauff	5	6	6
31	(Kazakhstan) Y Putintseva	6	6^{4}	2
(Estonia) K Kanepi	2	7^{7}	6
(Canada) L Fernandez	7^{7}	6
Q	(Croatia) A Konjuh	6^{3}	2
WC	(United States) A Parks	3	5
Q	(Serbia) O Danilović	6	7
(Czech Republic) M Bouzková	4	1
3	(Japan) N Osaka	6	6

Second round
16	(Germany) A Kerber	6	6
(Ukraine) A Kalinina	3	2
(United States) S Stephens	6	6
21	(United States) C Gauff	4	2
(Estonia) K Kanepi	5	5
(Canada) L Fernandez	7	7
Q	(Serbia) O Danilović
3	(Japan) N Osaka	w/o

Third round
16	(Germany) A Kerber	5	6	6
(United States) S Stephens	7	2	3
(Canada) L Fernandez	5	7^{7}	6
3	(Japan) N Osaka	7	6^{2}	4

Fourth round
16	(Germany) A Kerber	6	6^{5}	2
(Canada) L Fernandez	4	7^{7}	6

==== Section 7 ====
First round
8	(Czech Republic) B Krejčíková	6	6
Q	(Australia) A Sharma	0	4
WC	(United States) E Navarro	1	6^{5}
(United States) C McHale	6	7^{7}
(France) K Mladenovic	6	2	3
LL	(Russia) K Rakhimova	2	6	6
(Italy) S Errani	3	2
32	(Russia) E Alexandrova	6	6
18	(Belarus) V Azarenka	6	6
(Czech Republic) T Martincová	4	0
(Italy) J Paolini	6	6
PR	(Kazakhstan) Y Shvedova	3	4
(Germany) A Petkovic	6	7^{7}
(Romania) I-C Begu	2	6^{3}
(Croatia) D Vekić	6^{4}	6^{5}
9	(Spain) G Muguruza	7^{7}	7^{7}

Second round
8	(Czech Republic) B Krejčíková	6	6
(United States) C McHale	3	1
LL	(Russia) K Rakhimova	6	6
32	(Russia) E Alexandrova	4	1
18	(Belarus) V Azarenka	6	7^{7}
(Italy) J Paolini	3	6^{1}
(Germany) A Petkovic	4	2
9	(Spain) G Muguruza	6	6

Third round
8	(Czech Republic) B Krejčíková	6	6
LL	(Russia) K Rakhimova	4	2
18	(Belarus) V Azarenka	4	6	2
9	(Spain) G Muguruza	6	3	6

Fourth round
8	(Czech Republic) B Krejčíková	6	7^{7}
9	(Spain) G Muguruza	3	6^{4}

==== Section 8 ====
First round
15	(Belgium) E Mertens	3	7^{7}	7^{7}
(Sweden) R Peterson	6	6^{5}	6^{5}
Q	(Greece) V Grammatikopoulou	6	6
(Russia) A Blinkova	3	2
PR	(Serbia) I Jorović	2	2
(Colombia) C Osorio	6	6
(France) A Cornet	5	5
20	(Tunisia) O Jabeur	7	7
26	(United States) D Collins	6	6
PR	(Spain) C Suárez Navarro	2	4
(United Kingdom) H Watson	1	4
(Slovenia) K Juvan	6	6
(United States) B Pera	4	6^{4}
(Slovenia) T Zidanšek	6	7^{7}
(Serbia) N Stojanović	4	7^{7}	0
2	(Belarus) A Sabalenka	6	6^{4}	6

Second round
15	(Belgium) E Mertens	6	6
Q	(Greece) V Grammatikopoulou	2	2
(Colombia) C Osorio	0	1
20	(Tunisia) O Jabeur	6	6
26	(United States) D Collins	6	6
(Slovenia) K Juvan	4	2
(Slovenia) T Zidanšek	3	1
2	(Belarus) A Sabalenka	6	6

Third round
15	(Belgium) E Mertens	6	7
20	(Tunisia) O Jabeur	3	5
26	(United States) D Collins	3	3
2	(Belarus) A Sabalenka	6	6

Fourth round
15	(Belgium) E Mertens	4	1
2	(Belarus) A Sabalenka	6	6

== Championship match statistics ==
Category	(United Kingdom) Raducanu	(Canada) Fernandez
1st serve %	49/71 (69%)	45/78 (58%)
1st serve points won	33 of 49 = 67%	25 of 45 = 56%
2nd serve points won	10 of 22 = 45%	15 of 33 = 45%
Total service points won	43 of 71 = 57.33%	40 of 78 = 51.28%
Aces	3	2
Double faults	2	5
Winners	22	18
Unforced errors	25	26
Net points won	11 of 15 = 73%	9 of 12 = 75%
Break points converted	4 of 18 = 22%	2 of 9 = 22%
Return points won	38 of 78 = 49%	28 of 71 = 43%
Total points won	81	68

== Seeded players ==
The following are the seeded players. Seedings are based on WTA rankings as of August 23, 2021. Rank and points before are as of August 30, 2021.

As a result of pandemic-related adjustments to the ranking system, players are defending the greater of their points from the 2019 and 2020 tournaments. In addition, points from tournaments held during the weeks of September 9, 2019 and September 7, 2020 will be dropped at the end of the tournament and replaced by the player's next best result.

Seed	Rank	Player	Points before	Points defending from 2019 or 2020	Points won	Points after	Status
1	1	(Australia) Ashleigh Barty	10,185	240	130	10,075	Third round lost to (United States) Shelby Rogers
2	2	(Belarus) Aryna Sabalenka	7,010	70	780	7,720	Semifinals lost to (Canada) Leylah Fernandez
3	3	(Japan) Naomi Osaka	6,666	2,000	130	4,796	Third round lost to (Canada) Leylah Fernandez
4	4	(Czech Republic) Karolína Plíšková	5,530	240+470	430+65	5,315	Quarterfinals lost to (Greece) Maria Sakkari [17]
5	5	(Ukraine) Elina Svitolina	5,210	780	430	4,860	Quarterfinals lost to (Canada) Leylah Fernandez
6	7	(Canada) Bianca Andreescu	4,537	2,000	240	2,777	Fourth round lost to (Greece) Maria Sakkari [17]
7	8	(Poland) Iga Świątek	4,461	130	240	4,571	Fourth round lost to (Switzerland) Belinda Bencic [11]
8	9	(Czech Republic) Barbora Krejčíková	4,273	(35)^{†}	430	4,668	Quarterfinals lost to (Belarus) Aryna Sabalenka [2]
9	10	(Spain) Garbiñe Muguruza	4,210	70	240	4,380	Fourth round lost to (Czech Republic) Barbora Krejčíková [8]
10	11	(Czech Republic) Petra Kvitová	4,170	240	130	4,060	Third round lost to (Greece) Maria Sakkari [17]
11	12	(Switzerland) Belinda Bencic	4,170	780	430	3,820	Quarterfinals lost to (United Kingdom) Emma Raducanu [Q]
12	13	(Romania) Simona Halep	3,881	70	240	4,051	Fourth round lost to (Ukraine) Elina Svitolina [5]
~~13~~	~~14~~	~~(United States) Jennifer Brady~~	3,489	780+29	0+15	2,695	Withdrew due to injury
14	15	(Russia) Anastasia Pavlyuchenkova	3,420	70	240	3,590	Fourth round lost to (Czech Republic) Karolína Plíšková [4]
15	16	(Belgium) Elise Mertens	3,330	430	240	3,140	Fourth round lost to (Belarus) Aryna Sabalenka [2]
16	17	(Germany) Angelique Kerber	3,245	240	240	3,245	Fourth round lost to (Canada) Leylah Fernandez
17	18	(Greece) Maria Sakkari	3,210	240	780	3,750	Semifinals lost to (United Kingdom) Emma Raducanu [Q]
18	19	(Belarus) Victoria Azarenka	3,160	1,300	130	1,990	Third round lost to (Spain) Garbiñe Muguruza [9]
19	20	(Kazakhstan) Elena Rybakina	3,083	70+180	130+105	3,068	Third round lost to (Romania) Simona Halep [12]
20	21	(Tunisia) Ons Jabeur	2,975	130	130	2,975	Third round lost to (Belgium) Elise Mertens [15]
21	23	(United States) Coco Gauff	2,875	130	70	2,815	Second round lost to (United States) Sloane Stephens
22	24	(Czech Republic) Karolína Muchová	2,862	240	10	2,632	First round lost to (Spain) Sara Sorribes Tormo
23	25	(United States) Jessica Pegula	2,425	130	130	2,425	Third round lost to (Switzerland) Belinda Bencic [11]
24	26	(Spain) Paula Badosa	2,343	30+110	70+30	2,303	Second round lost to (Russia) Varvara Gracheva
25	27	(Russia) Daria Kasatkina	2,340	10	130	2,460	Third round lost to (Ukraine) Elina Svitolina [5]
26	29	(United States) Danielle Collins	2,270	70	130	2,330	Third round lost to (Belarus) Aryna Sabalenka [2]
~~27~~	~~30~~	~~(Latvia) Jeļena Ostapenko~~	2,170	130	0	2,040	Withdrew for medical reasons
28	28	(Estonia) Anett Kontaveit	2,315	240	130	2,205	Third round lost to (Poland) Iga Świątek [7]
29	31	(Russia) Veronika Kudermetova	2,040	10+110	10+100	2,030	First round lost to (Romania) Sorana Cîrstea
30	32	(Croatia) Petra Martić	2,005	240+305	70+55	1,585	Second round lost to (Australia) Ajla Tomljanović
31	33	(Kazakhstan) Yulia Putintseva	1,910	430	10	1,490	First round lost to (Estonia) Kaia Kanepi
32	34	(Russia) Ekaterina Alexandrova	1,866	70	70	1,866	Second round lost to (Russia) Kamilla Rakhimova [LL]

† The player did not qualify for the tournament in 2019 or 2020. Accordingly, points for her 16th best result are deducted instead.

=== Withdrawn players ===
The following players would have been seeded, but withdrew before the tournament began.

Rank	Player	Points before	Points defending from 2019 or 2020	Points after	Withdrawal reason
6	(United States) Sofia Kenin	5,030	240+100	4,691	Positive COVID-19 test
22	(United States) Serena Williams	2,891	1,300	1,591	Hamstring injury in right leg

== Other entry information ==
=== Wild card entries ===
- (United States) Hailey Baptiste
- (United States) Ashlyn Krueger
- (United States) Caty McNally
- (United States) Emma Navarro
- (United States) Alycia Parks
- (Australia) Storm Sanders
- (United States) CoCo Vandeweghe
- (United States) Katie Volynets

=== Qualifiers ===
- (United Kingdom) Katie Boulter
- (Spain) Cristina Bucșa
- (Serbia) Olga Danilović
- (United Kingdom) Harriet Dart
- (Hungary) Dalma Gálfi
- (Greece) Valentini Grammatikopoulou
- (Croatia) Ana Konjuh
- (United States) Jamie Loeb
- (Canada) Rebecca Marino
- (Spain) Rebeka Masarova
- (Spain) Nuria Párrizas Díaz
- (Czech Republic) Kristýna Plíšková
- (United Kingdom) Emma Raducanu
- (Romania) Elena-Gabriela Ruse
- (Slovakia) Anna Karolína Schmiedlová
- (Australia) Astra Sharma

=== Lucky losers ===
- (Slovakia) Kristína Kučová
- (Belgium) Greet Minnen
- (Russia) Kamilla Rakhimova
- (Egypt) Mayar Sherif
- (Bulgaria) Viktoriya Tomova
- (Switzerland) Stefanie Vögele

=== Protected ranking ===
- (Kazakhstan) Yaroslava Shvedova (47)
- (Spain) Carla Suárez Navarro (68)
- (Serbia) Ivana Jorović (90)
- (Australia) Samantha Stosur (97)

=== Withdrawals ===
- ‡ (Netherlands) Kiki Bertens (21) (Note: Retirement from tennis) → replaced by (Romania) Ana Bogdan (101)
- ‡ (Russia) Svetlana Kuznetsova (41) → replaced by (Italy) Martina Trevisan (102)
- ‡ (China) Zheng Saisai (52) → replaced by (Bulgaria) Tsvetana Pironkova (103)
- ‡ (China) Zhu Lin (93) → replaced by (Italy) Sara Errani (104)
- ‡ (China) Wang Qiang (49) → replaced by (Belgium) Kirsten Flipkens (105) (Note: Flipkens had initially replaced Wang, but later withdrew due to continuous injuries. Venus Williams was the next player initially entered into the main draw to replace Flipkens, but she later herself withdrew due to recurring injury.)
- ‡ (Romania) Patricia Maria Țig (74) → replaced by (United States) Claire Liu (106)
- ‡ (Germany) Laura Siegemund (61) → replaced by (Slovenia) Kaja Juvan (107)
- ‡ (Belgium) Kirsten Flipkens (105) → replaced by (United States) Venus Williams (108) (Note: Last direct acceptance)
- † (United States) Serena Williams (16) → replaced by (Egypt) Mayar Sherif (LL)
- † (United States) Venus Williams (108) → replaced by (Slovakia) Kristína Kučová (LL)
- † (United States) Sofia Kenin (4) → replaced by (Bulgaria) Viktoriya Tomova (LL)
- § (United States) Jennifer Brady (15) → replaced by (Switzerland) Stefanie Vögele (LL)
- § (Latvia) Jeļena Ostapenko (30) → replaced by (Belgium) Greet Minnen (LL)
- § (United Kingdom) Johanna Konta (40) → replaced by (Russia) Kamilla Rakhimova (LL)

‡ – withdrew from entry list before qualifying began
† – withdrew from entry list after qualifying began
§ – withdrew from main draw

== See also ==
- 2021 US Open – Day-by-day summaries

== Explanatory notes ==
Preceded by 2021 Wimbledon Championships – Women's singles	Grand Slam women's singles	Succeeded by 2022 Australian Open – Women's singles
