= 2021 US Open – Men's doubles =

Men's doubles
- 2021 US Open

Final
- Champions: (United States) Rajeev Ram (United Kingdom) Joe Salisbury
- Runners-up: (United Kingdom) Jamie Murray (Brazil) Bruno Soares
- Score: 3–6, 6–2, 6–2

Events
Singles	men	women		boys	girls
Doubles	men	women	mixed	boys	girls
WC Singles	men	women	quad
WC Doubles	men	women	quad
Legends	men	women	mixed
- US Open

Rajeev Ram and Joe Salisbury defeated the defending champion Bruno Soares and his partner Jamie Murray in the final, 3–6, 6–2, 6–2 to win the men's doubles tennis title at the 2021 US Open. It was the second major title for Ram and Salisbury as a team, following the 2020 Australian Open. Ram and Salisbury saved four match points en route to the title, in the quarterfinals against Matthew Ebden and Max Purcell.

Soares and Mate Pavić were the defending champions, but did not play together. Pavić partnered Nikola Mektić, but lost in the first round to Nathaniel Lammons and Jackson Withrow.

Salisbury also won the mixed doubles title partnering Desirae Krawczyk, becoming the first man to win both the men's doubles and mixed doubles titles at the US Open in the same year since Bob Bryan in 2010.

== Seeds ==
1. (Croatia) Nikola Mektić / (Croatia) Mate Pavić (first round)
2. (Spain) Marcel Granollers / (Argentina) Horacio Zeballos (quarterfinals)
3. (France) Pierre-Hugues Herbert / (France) Nicolas Mahut (quarterfinals)
4. (United States) Rajeev Ram / (United Kingdom) Joe Salisbury (champions)
5. (Colombia) Juan Sebastián Cabal / (Colombia) Robert Farah (first round)
6. (Germany) Kevin Krawietz / (Romania) Horia Tecău (quarterfinals)
7. (United Kingdom) Jamie Murray / (Brazil) Bruno Soares (final)
8. (Australia) John Peers / (Slovakia) Filip Polášek (semifinals)

9. (Poland) Łukasz Kubot / (Brazil) Marcelo Melo (first round)
10. (Netherlands) Wesley Koolhof / (Netherlands) Jean-Julien Rojer (third round)
11. (South Africa) Raven Klaasen / (Japan) Ben McLachlan (second round)
12. (Germany) Tim Pütz / (New Zealand) Michael Venus (first round, retired)
13. (India) Rohan Bopanna / (Croatia) Ivan Dodig (third round)
14. (Italy) Simone Bolelli / (Argentina) Máximo González (second round)
15. (Kazakhstan) Andrey Golubev / (Germany) Andreas Mies (third round)
16. (Belgium) Sander Gillé / (Belgium) Joran Vliegen (second round)

Click on the seed number of a player to go to their draw section.

== Draw ==
Key

- Q = Qualifier
- WC = Wild card
- LL = Lucky loser
- Alt = Alternate
- ITF = ITF entry
- PR = Protected ranking
- SR = Special ranking
- SE = Special exempt
- JE = Junior exempt
- JR = Junior Accelerator Programme entrant
- CO = College Accelerator Programme entrant
- NG = Next Gen Accelerator Program entrant
- w/o = Walkover
- r = Retired
- d = Defaulted

=== Finals ===
Quarterfinals
WC	(United States) Steve Johnson (United States) Sam Querrey	6	7^{7}
6	(Germany) Kevin Krawietz (Romania) Horia Tecău	2	6^{5}
4	(United States) Rajeev Ram (United Kingdom) Joe Salisbury	7^{9}	6^{6}	7^{12}
(Australia) Matthew Ebden (Australia) Max Purcell	6^{7}	7^{8}	6^{10}
8	(Australia) John Peers (Slovakia) Filip Polášek	6	6
3	(France) Pierre-Hugues Herbert (France) Nicolas Mahut	2	3
7	(United Kingdom) Jamie Murray (Brazil) Bruno Soares	6^{5}	6	6
2	(Spain) Marcel Granollers (Argentina) Horacio Zeballos	7^{7}	4	4

Semifinals
WC	(United States) Steve Johnson (United States) Sam Querrey	6^{5}	4
4	(United States) Rajeev Ram (United Kingdom) Joe Salisbury	7^{7}	6
8	(Australia) John Peers (Slovakia) Filip Polášek	3	6	4
7	(United Kingdom) Jamie Murray (Brazil) Bruno Soares	6	3	6

Final
4	(United States) Rajeev Ram (United Kingdom) Joe Salisbury	3	6	6
7	(United Kingdom) Jamie Murray (Brazil) Bruno Soares	6	2	2

=== Top half ===
==== Section 1 ====
First round
1	(Croatia) N Mektić (Croatia) M Pavić	2	5
WC	(United States) N Lammons (United States) J Withrow	6	7
(Australia) L Saville (Australia) J-P Smith	4	4
(Lithuania) R Berankis (France) B Paire	6	6
WC	(United States) S Johnson (United States) S Querrey	6^{4}	6	7^{7}
(El Salvador) M Arévalo (Netherlands) M Middelkoop	7^{7}	4	6^{3}
(United Kingdom) C Norrie (Germany) J-L Struff	6^{5}	3
14	(Italy) S Bolelli (Argentina) M González	7^{7}	6
11	(South Africa) R Klaasen (Japan) B McLachlan	6	6^{7}	7^{7}
WC	(United States) M Krueger (United States) M Mmoh	4	7^{9}	6^{5}
(Mexico) S González (Argentina) A Molteni	5	6	6
(Netherlands) R Haase (United States) M McDonald	7	3	2
Alt	(Denmark) F Nielsen (Canada) V Pospisil	6	7^{7}
(United States) M Giron (Sweden) A Göransson	3	6^{3}
(Hungary) M Fucsovics (Italy) S Travaglia	3	2
6	(Germany) K Krawietz (Romania) H Tecău	6	6

Second round
WC	(United States) N Lammons (United States) J Withrow	4	2
(Lithuania) R Berankis (France) B Paire	6	6
WC	(United States) S Johnson (United States) S Querrey	7^{7}	6
14	(Italy) S Bolelli (Argentina) M González	6^{5}	4
11	(South Africa) R Klaasen (Japan) B McLachlan	1	6	6^{7}
(Mexico) S González (Argentina) A Molteni	6	3	7^{9}
Alt	(Denmark) F Nielsen (Canada) V Pospisil	6^{12}	6^{4}
6	(Germany) K Krawietz (Romania) H Tecău	7^{14}	7^{7}

Third round
(Lithuania) R Berankis (France) B Paire	3	4
WC	(United States) S Johnson (United States) S Querrey	6	6
(Mexico) S González (Argentina) A Molteni	2	6^{5}
6	(Germany) K Krawietz (Romania) H Tecău	6	7^{7}

Quarterfinals
WC	(United States) S Johnson (United States) S Querrey	6	7^{7}
6	(Germany) K Krawietz (Romania) H Tecău	2	6^{5}

==== Section 2 ====
First round
4	(United States) R Ram (United Kingdom) J Salisbury	6	6
Alt	(South Korea) S-w Kwon (India) D Sharan	3	4
(Australia) J Millman (Brazil) T Monteiro	6	6
(Australia) A de Minaur (Australia) M Reid	3	2
(Serbia) M Kecmanović (Norway) C Ruud	2	0^{r}
(Monaco) H Nys (France) A Rinderknech	6	2
(Australia) J Duckworth (Australia) J Thompson	6	3	6^{1}
13	(India) R Bopanna (Croatia) I Dodig	3	6	7^{7}
9	(Poland) Ł Kubot (Brazil) M Melo	6^{2}	4
WC	(United States) E King (United States) H Reese	7^{7}	6
(Finland) H Heliövaara (Finland) H Kontinen	5	6	6^{10}
(United Kingdom) D Inglot (United States) A Krajicek	7	4	7^{12}
(Serbia) D Lajović (United States) B Nakashima	6^{4}	6^{2}
(Australia) M Ebden (Australia) M Purcell	7^{7}	7^{7}
(Poland) H Hurkacz (Poland) S Walków	6	6^{2}	6
5	(Colombia) JS Cabal (Colombia) R Farah	3	7^{7}	3

Second round
4	(United States) R Ram (United Kingdom) J Salisbury	6	6
(Australia) J Millman (Brazil) T Monteiro	3	4
(Monaco) H Nys (France) A Rinderknech	3	6	4
13	(India) R Bopanna (Croatia) I Dodig	6	4	6
WC	(United States) E King (United States) H Reese	7^{7}	6
(United Kingdom) D Inglot (United States) A Krajicek	6^{5}	4
(Australia) M Ebden (Australia) M Purcell	6	7^{7}
(Poland) H Hurkacz (Poland) S Walków	4	6^{4}

Third round
4	(United States) R Ram (United Kingdom) J Salisbury	6^{4}	6	7^{7}
13	(India) R Bopanna (Croatia) I Dodig	7^{7}	4	6^{3}
WC	(United States) E King (United States) H Reese	4	4
(Australia) M Ebden (Australia) M Purcell	6	6

Quarterfinals
4	(United States) R Ram (United Kingdom) J Salisbury	7^{9}	6^{6}	7^{12}
(Australia) M Ebden (Australia) M Purcell	6^{7}	7^{8}	6^{10}

=== Bottom half ===
==== Section 3 ====
First round
8	(Australia) J Peers (Slovakia) F Polášek	6	6
(United Kingdom) L Bambridge (United Kingdom) K Skupski	3	3
(Austria) O Marach (Austria) P Oswald	2	7^{7}	2
(Israel) J Erlich (South Africa) L Harris	6	6^{3}	6
WC	(United States) R Galloway (United States) A Lawson	6	6
(Argentina) F Coria (Italy) G Mager	1	3
(Russia) A Karatsev (Kazakhstan) A Nedovyesov	6^{13}	1
10	(Netherlands) W Koolhof (Netherlands) J-J Rojer	7^{15}	6
15	(Kazakhstan) A Golubev (Germany) A Mies	6	6
(Spain) P Martínez (Spain) A Ramos Viñolas	4	4
(Uruguay) P Cuevas (France) A Mannarino	7^{8}	2	4
(Bosnia and Herzegovina) T Brkić (Serbia) N Ćaćić	6^{6}	6	6
(New Zealand) M Daniell (Brazil) M Demoliner	6^{4}	6	2
(United Kingdom) D Evans (United Kingdom) L Glasspool	7^{7}	4	1^{r}
WC	(United States) E Spizzirri (United States) T Zink	4	4
3	(France) P-H Herbert (France) N Mahut	6	6

Second round
8	(Australia) J Peers (Slovakia) F Polášek	7^{7}	6
(Israel) J Erlich (South Africa) L Harris	6^{5}	4
WC	(United States) R Galloway (United States) A Lawson	3	6^{3}
10	(Netherlands) W Koolhof (Netherlands) J-J Rojer	6	7^{7}
15	(Kazakhstan) A Golubev (Germany) A Mies	7	6
(Bosnia and Herzegovina) T Brkić (Serbia) N Ćaćić	5	2
(New Zealand) M Daniell (Brazil) M Demoliner	3	7^{7}	6^{1}
3	(France) P-H Herbert (France) N Mahut	6	6^{3}	7^{7}

Third round
8	(Australia) J Peers (Slovakia) F Polášek	4	6	6
10	(Netherlands) W Koolhof (Netherlands) J-J Rojer	6	3	4
15	(Kazakhstan) A Golubev (Germany) A Mies	6	5	3
3	(France) P-H Herbert (France) N Mahut	4	7	6

Quarterfinals
8	(Australia) J Peers (Slovakia) F Polášek	6	6
3	(France) P-H Herbert (France) N Mahut	2	3

==== Section 4 ====
First round
7	(United Kingdom) J Murray (Brazil) B Soares	6	6
(United States) T Paul (Australia) A Popyrin	4	2
WC	(United States) C Eubanks (United States) B Fratangelo	4	6	6
(United States) N Monroe (United States) F Tiafoe	6	3	2
(Serbia) L Djere (Serbia) F Krajinović	2	3
(United Kingdom) N Skupski (United States) J Sock	6	6
(Germany) D Koepfer (Finland) E Ruusuvuori	3	6
12	(Germany) T Pütz (New Zealand) M Venus	6	5^{r}
16	(Belgium) S Gillé (Belgium) J Vliegen	6	6
(Belarus) I Ivashka (Spain) J Munar	3	3
(United Kingdom) J O'Mara (Pakistan) A-u-H Qureshi	6	3	6
(Uruguay) A Behar (Ecuador) G Escobar	3	6	3
(France) J Chardy (France) F Martin	6	6^{5}	6
(Austria) J Melzer (Australia) M Polmans	3	7^{7}	3
(Argentina) F Bagnis (Argentina) F Delbonis	3	3
2	(Spain) M Granollers (Argentina) H Zeballos	6	6

Second round
7	(United Kingdom) J Murray (Brazil) B Soares	7^{7}	6
WC	(United States) C Eubanks (United States) B Fratangelo	6^{4}	4
(United Kingdom) N Skupski (United States) J Sock
(Germany) D Koepfer (Finland) E Ruusuvuori	w/o
16	(Belgium) S Gillé (Belgium) J Vliegen	6	3	6^{3}
(United Kingdom) J O'Mara (Pakistan) A-u-H Qureshi	3	6	7^{7}
(France) J Chardy (France) F Martin	7^{7}	5	6^{4}
2	(Spain) M Granollers (Argentina) H Zeballos	6^{4}	7	7^{7}

Third round
7	(United Kingdom) J Murray (Brazil) B Soares	7^{8}	6^{4}	6
(Germany) D Koepfer (Finland) E Ruusuvuori	6^{6}	7^{7}	1
(United Kingdom) J O'Mara (Pakistan) A-u-H Qureshi	5	5
2	(Spain) M Granollers (Argentina) H Zeballos	7	7

Quarterfinals
7	(United Kingdom) J Murray (Brazil) B Soares	6^{5}	6	6
2	(Spain) M Granollers (Argentina) H Zeballos	7^{7}	4	4

== Other entry information ==
=== Wild card entries ===
- (United States) Christopher Eubanks / (United States) Bjorn Fratangelo
- (United States) Robert Galloway / (United States) Alex Lawson
- (United States) Steve Johnson / (United States) Sam Querrey
- (United States) Evan King / (United States) Hunter Reese
- (United States) Mitchell Krueger / (United States) Michael Mmoh
- (United States) Nathaniel Lammons / (United States) Jackson Withrow
- (United States) Eliot Spizzirri / (United States) Tyler Zink

=== Alternates ===
- (South Korea) Kwon Soon-woo / (India) Divij Sharan
- (Denmark) Frederik Nielsen / (Canada) Vasek Pospisil

=== Withdrawals ===
Before the tournament

- (Georgia (country)) Nikoloz Basilashvili / (Belarus) Andrei Vasilevski → replaced by (South Korea) Kwon Soon-woo / (India) Divij Sharan
- (Slovenia) Aljaž Bedene / (Serbia) Laslo Đere → replaced by (Serbia) Laslo Đere / (Serbia) Filip Krajinović
- (Kazakhstan) Alexander Bublik / (Spain) David Vega Hernández → replaced by (Denmark) Frederik Nielsen / (Canada) Vasek Pospisil
- (Australia) James Duckworth / (Japan) Yoshihito Nishioka → replaced by (Australia) James Duckworth / (Australia) Jordan Thompson
- (Austria) Jürgen Melzer / (France) Jo-Wilfried Tsonga → replaced by (Austria) Jürgen Melzer / (Australia) Marc Polmans

== See also ==
- 2021 US Open – Day-by-day summaries
