= 2021 US Open – Women's doubles =

Women's doubles
- 2021 US Open

Final
- Champions: (Australia) Samantha Stosur (China) Zhang Shuai
- Runners-up: (United States) Coco Gauff (United States) Caty McNally
- Score: 6–3, 3–6, 6–3

Details
- Draw: 64
- Seeds: 16

Events
Singles	men	women		boys	girls
Doubles	men	women	mixed	boys	girls
WC Singles	men	women	quad
WC Doubles	men	women	quad
Legends	men	women	mixed
← 2020 ·	US Open	· 2022 →

Samantha Stosur and Zhang Shuai defeated Coco Gauff and Caty McNally in the final, 6–3, 3–6, 6–3 to win the women's doubles title at the 2021 US Open. It was Stosur's fourth major title in women's doubles and eighth major overall, as well as Zhang's second major title; this was the team's second major title, following the 2019 Australian Open. This was the first major final for Gauff and for McNally.

Laura Siegemund and Vera Zvonareva were the reigning champions, but Siegemund did not participate due to injury. Zvonareva was scheduled to play partnering Jeļena Ostapenko, but Ostapenko withdrew from both the singles and doubles draws on the first day of the tournament.

Hsieh Su-wei regained the WTA No. 1 doubles ranking from her partner Elise Mertens after Barbora Krejčíková lost in the first round.

This was the final tournament for former WTA Finals finalist, 2014 French Open semifinalist and former doubles world No. 11 Carla Suárez Navarro. She partnered Sara Errani, but lost in the first round to Gauff and McNally.

== Seeds ==
1. (Chinese Taipei) Hsieh Su-wei / (Belgium) Elise Mertens (quarterfinals)
2. (Czech Republic) Barbora Krejčíková / (Czech Republic) Kateřina Siniaková (first round)
3. (Japan) Shuko Aoyama / (Japan) Ena Shibahara (third round)
4. (United States) Nicole Melichar-Martinez / (Netherlands) Demi Schuurs (first round)
5. (Canada) Gabriela Dabrowski / (Brazil) Luisa Stefani (semifinals, retired)
6. (Russia) Veronika Kudermetova / (United States) Bethanie Mattek-Sands (third round)
7. (Chile) Alexa Guarachi / (United States) Desirae Krawczyk (semifinals)
8. (Croatia) Darija Jurak / (Slovenia) Andreja Klepač (third round)

9. (Latvia) Jeļena Ostapenko / (Russia) Vera Zvonareva (withdrew)
10. (United States) Caroline Dolehide / (Australia) Storm Sanders (quarterfinals)
11. (United States) Coco Gauff / (United States) Caty McNally (final)
12. (Ukraine) Nadiia Kichenok / (Romania) Raluca Olaru (third round)
13. (United States) Asia Muhammad / (United States) Jessica Pegula (first round)
14. (Australia) Samantha Stosur / (China) Zhang Shuai (champions)
15. (Czech Republic) Marie Bouzková / (Czech Republic) Lucie Hradecká (quarterfinals)
16. (Australia) Ellen Perez / (Czech Republic) Květa Peschke (second round)
17. (Serbia) Aleksandra Krunić / (Serbia) Nina Stojanović (second round)

Click on the seed number of a player to go to their draw section.

== Draw ==
=== Key ===
- Q = Qualifier
- WC = Wild card
- LL = Lucky loser
- Alt = Alternate
- SE = Special exempt
- PR = Protected ranking
- ITF = ITF entry
- JE = Junior exempt
- w/o = Walkover
- r = Retired
- d = Defaulted
- SR = Special ranking

=== Finals ===
Quarterfinals
1	(Chinese Taipei) Hsieh Su-wei (Belgium) Elise Mertens	3	6^{1}
11	(United States) Coco Gauff (United States) Caty McNally	6	7^{7}
15	(Czech Republic) Marie Bouzková (Czech Republic) Lucie Hradecká	4	6	1
5	(Canada) Gabriela Dabrowski (Brazil) Luisa Stefani	6	4	6
10	(United States) Caroline Dolehide (Australia) Storm Sanders	2	3
14	(Australia) Samantha Stosur (China) Zhang Shuai	6	6
7	(Chile) Alexa Guarachi (United States) Desirae Krawczyk	6^{5}	6	6
(Romania) Monica Niculescu (Romania) Elena-Gabriela Ruse	7^{7}	2	3

Semifinals
11	(United States) Coco Gauff (United States) Caty McNally	6
5	(Canada) Gabriela Dabrowski (Brazil) Luisa Stefani	6^{r}
14	(Australia) Samantha Stosur (China) Zhang Shuai	6	7
7	(Chile) Alexa Guarachi (United States) Desirae Krawczyk	2	5

Final
11	(United States) Coco Gauff (United States) Caty McNally	3	6	3
14	(Australia) Samantha Stosur (China) Zhang Shuai	6	3	6

=== Top half ===
==== Section 1 ====
First round
1	(Chinese Taipei) S-w Hsieh (Belgium) E Mertens	6	6
(Russia) A Kalinskaya (Kazakhstan) Y Putintseva	0	0
(Russia) E Alexandrova (Georgia (country)) O Kalashnikova	6	4	3
Alt	(Norway) U Eikeri (France) E Lechemia	4	6	6
(Belgium) G Minnen (Belgium) A Van Uytvanck	6	6
(Ukraine) L Kichenok (Japan) M Ninomiya	3	4
PR	(Serbia) I Jorović (Netherlands) L Pattinama Kerkhove	2	2
16	(Australia) E Perez (Czech Republic) K Peschke	6	6
11	(United States) C Gauff (United States) C McNally	6	6
Alt	(Italy) S Errani (Spain) C Suárez Navarro	3	4
(Czech Republic) T Martincová (Czech Republic) M Vondroušová	7	6
(United States) H Carter (Australia) A Sharma	5	2
(Russia) D Kasatkina (Estonia) A Kontaveit	6	6
(United States) A Li (United States) A Riske	2	4
Alt	(Ukraine) K Bondarenko (India) A Raina	1	1
8	(Croatia) D Jurak (Slovenia) A Klepač	6	6

Second round
1	(Chinese Taipei) S-w Hsieh (Belgium) E Mertens	6	6
Alt	(Norway) U Eikeri (France) E Lechemia	4	2
(Belgium) G Minnen (Belgium) A Van Uytvanck	7	1	6
16	(Australia) E Perez (Czech Republic) K Peschke	5	6	2
11	(United States) C Gauff (United States) C McNally	6	6
(Czech Republic) T Martincová (Czech Republic) M Vondroušová	4	3
(Russia) D Kasatkina (Estonia) A Kontaveit	1	2
8	(Croatia) D Jurak (Slovenia) A Klepač	6	6

Third round
1	(Chinese Taipei) S-w Hsieh (Belgium) E Mertens	6	6
(Belgium) G Minnen (Belgium) A Van Uytvanck	0	2
11	(United States) C Gauff (United States) C McNally	6	6
8	(Croatia) D Jurak (Slovenia) A Klepač	4	4

Quarterfinals
1	(Chinese Taipei) S-w Hsieh (Belgium) E Mertens	3	6^{1}
11	(United States) C Gauff (United States) C McNally	6	7^{7}

==== Section 2 ====
First round
4	(United States) N Melichar-Martinez (Netherlands) D Schuurs	2	4
PR	(Australia) An Rodionova (Australia) Ar Rodionova	6	6
(United States) K Christian (Japan) N Hibino	6^{1}	4
(Ukraine) A Kalinina (Czech Republic) R Voráčová	7^{7}	6
Alt	(Kazakhstan) Z Diyas (Russia) V Gracheva	7^{7}	4	6
(Japan) M Doi (Germany) A-L Friedsam	6^{5}	6	2
WC	(United States) M Jones (United States) E Scotty	6^{0}	6^{3}
15	(Czech Republic) M Bouzková (Czech Republic) L Hradecká	7^{7}	7^{7}
17	(Serbia) A Krunić (Serbia) N Stojanović	6	6
WC	(United States) UM Arconada (United States) W Osuigwe	3	3
WC	(United States) H Baptiste (United States) E Navarro	6	1	3
(Ukraine) M Kostyuk (Ukraine) D Yastremska	3	6	6
PR	(Luxembourg) M Minella (Russia) L Samsonova	6^{2}	6	4
(Croatia) P Martić (United States) S Rogers	7^{7}	1	6
(Switzerland) V Golubic (Slovenia) T Zidanšek	1	2
5	(Canada) G Dabrowski (Brazil) L Stefani	6	6

Second round
PR	(Australia) An Rodionova (Australia) Ar Rodionova	4	6	6
(Ukraine) A Kalinina (Czech Republic) R Voráčová	6	3	4
Alt	(Kazakhstan) Z Diyas (Russia) V Gracheva	5	2
15	(Czech Republic) M Bouzková (Czech Republic) L Hradecká	7	6
17	(Serbia) A Krunić (Serbia) N Stojanović	4	6	4
(Ukraine) M Kostyuk (Ukraine) D Yastremska	6	4	6
(Croatia) P Martić (United States) S Rogers	4	7^{7}	6^{3}
5	(Canada) G Dabrowski (Brazil) L Stefani	6	6^{5}	7^{7}

Third round
PR	(Australia) An Rodionova (Australia) Ar Rodionova	2	5
15	(Czech Republic) M Bouzková (Czech Republic) L Hradecká	6	7
(Ukraine) M Kostyuk (Ukraine) D Yastremska	7^{7}	4	2
5	(Canada) G Dabrowski (Brazil) L Stefani	6^{5}	6	6

Quarterfinals
15	(Czech Republic) M Bouzková (Czech Republic) L Hradecká	4	6	1
5	(Canada) G Dabrowski (Brazil) L Stefani	6	4	6

=== Bottom half ===
==== Section 3 ====
First round
6	(Russia) V Kudermetova (United States) B Mattek-Sands	6	7^{7}
PR	(Belarus) A Sasnovich (Kazakhstan) G Voskoboeva	4	6^{3}
(Chinese Taipei) H-c Chan (United Kingdom) H Dart	6^{5}	5
(France) A Cornet (France) F Ferro	7^{7}	7
(France) C Garcia (Argentina) N Podoroska	4	6^{4}
(Romania) I-C Begu (Romania) A Mitu	6	7^{7}
WC	(United States) L Davis (United States) I Neel	3	0
10	(United States) C Dolehide (Australia) S Sanders	6	6
14	(Australia) S Stosur (China) S Zhang	6	6
(Italy) J Paolini (Switzerland) J Teichmann	4	0
(Slovakia) V Kužmová (Netherlands) A Rus	4	4
(Japan) M Kato (United States) S Santamaria	6	6
PR	(Japan) E Hozumi (Poland) A Rosolska	6	6
(Germany) J Lohoff (Belarus) L Marozava	3	3
WC	(United States) M Brengle (United States) C Liu	2	3
3	(Japan) S Aoyama (Japan) E Shibahara	6	6

Second round
6	(Russia) V Kudermetova (United States) B Mattek-Sands	6	6
(France) A Cornet (France) F Ferro	2	2
(Romania) I-C Begu (Romania) A Mitu	0	1
10	(United States) C Dolehide (Australia) S Sanders	6	6
14	(Australia) S Stosur (China) S Zhang	6	6
(Japan) M Kato (United States) S Santamaria	2	4
PR	(Japan) E Hozumi (Poland) A Rosolska	6^{5}	2
3	(Japan) S Aoyama (Japan) E Shibahara	7^{7}	6

Third round
6	(Russia) V Kudermetova (United States) B Mattek-Sands	6	3	2
10	(United States) C Dolehide (Australia) S Sanders	4	6	6
14	(Australia) S Stosur (China) S Zhang	7	7
3	(Japan) S Aoyama (Japan) E Shibahara	5	5

Quarterfinals
10	(United States) C Dolehide (Australia) S Sanders	2	3
14	(Australia) S Stosur (China) S Zhang	6	6

==== Section 4 ====
First round
7	(Chile) A Guarachi (United States) D Krawczyk	6	6
PR	(Kazakhstan) A Danilina (Kazakhstan) Y Shvedova	3	4
(Colombia) C Osorio (Netherlands) R van der Hoek	3	2
(Montenegro) D Kovinić (Sweden) R Peterson	6	6
(Germany) A Petkovic (Australia) A Tomljanović	6	6
Alt	(United States) E Bektas (United Kingdom) T Moore	2	4
WC	(India) S Mirza (United States) C Vandeweghe	6	4	3
12	(Ukraine) N Kichenok (Romania) R Olaru	4	6	6
13	(United States) A Muhammad (United States) J Pegula	2	6^{5}
WC	(United States) A Krueger (United States) R Montgomery	6	7^{7}
(United States) C McHale (Mexico) G Olmos	4	2
(Canada) L Fernandez (New Zealand) E Routliffe	6	6
(Romania) M Niculescu (Romania) E-G Ruse	6	5	7
(Slovenia) P Hercog (Latvia) A Sevastova	1	7	5
(Poland) M Linette (United States) B Pera	6	6
2	(Czech Republic) B Krejčíková (Czech Republic) K Siniaková	3	4

Second round
7	(Chile) A Guarachi (United States) D Krawczyk	6	6
(Montenegro) D Kovinić (Sweden) R Peterson	1	3
(Germany) A Petkovic (Australia) A Tomljanović	7	1	2
12	(Ukraine) N Kichenok (Romania) R Olaru	5	6	6
WC	(United States) A Krueger (United States) R Montgomery	2	2
(Canada) L Fernandez (New Zealand) E Routliffe	6	6
(Romania) M Niculescu (Romania) E-G Ruse	6	7
(Poland) M Linette (United States) B Pera	3	5

Third round
7	(Chile) A Guarachi (United States) D Krawczyk	6	6
12	(Ukraine) N Kichenok (Romania) R Olaru	3	2
(Canada) L Fernandez (New Zealand) E Routliffe	1	6	2
(Romania) M Niculescu (Romania) E-G Ruse	6	4	6

Quarterfinals
7	(Chile) A Guarachi (United States) D Krawczyk	6^{5}	6	6
(Romania) M Niculescu (Romania) E-G Ruse	7^{7}	2	3

== Other entry information ==
=== Wild cards ===
- (United States) Usue Maitane Arconada / (United States) Whitney Osuigwe
- (United States) Hailey Baptiste / (United States) Emma Navarro
- (United States) Madison Brengle / (United States) Claire Liu
- (United States) Lauren Davis / (United States) Ingrid Neel
- (United States) Makenna Jones / (United States) Elizabeth Scotty
- (United States) Ashlyn Krueger / (United States) Robin Montgomery
- (India) Sania Mirza / (United States) CoCo Vandeweghe

=== Protected ranking ===
- (Kazakhstan) Anna Danilina / (Kazakhstan) Yaroslava Shvedova
- (Japan) Eri Hozumi / (Poland) Alicja Rosolska
- (Serbia) Ivana Jorović / (Netherlands) Lesley Pattinama Kerkhove
- (Luxembourg) Mandy Minella / (Russia) Liudmila Samsonova
- (Australia) Anastasia Rodionova / (Australia) Arina Rodionova
- (Belarus) Aliaksandra Sasnovich / (Kazakhstan) Galina Voskoboeva

=== Alternates ===
- (United States) Emina Bektas / (United Kingdom) Tara Moore
- (Ukraine) Kateryna Bondarenko / (India) Ankita Raina
- (Kazakhstan) Zarina Diyas / (Russia) Varvara Gracheva
- (Norway) Ulrikke Eikeri / (France) Elixane Lechemia
- (Italy) Sara Errani / (Spain) Carla Suárez Navarro

=== Withdrawals ===
Before the tournament

- (United States) Amanda Anisimova / (Russia) Anastasia Potapova → replaced by (Norway) Ulrikke Eikeri / (France) Elixane Lechemia
- (Spain) Paula Badosa / (Spain) Sara Sorribes Tormo → replaced by (Ukraine) Kateryna Bondarenko / (India) Ankita Raina
- (Russia) Anna Blinkova / (United Kingdom) Heather Watson → replaced by (Kazakhstan) Zarina Diyas / (Russia) Varvara Gracheva
- (Latvia) Jeļena Ostapenko / (Russia) Vera Zvonareva → replaced by (Italy) Sara Errani / (Spain) Carla Suárez Navarro
- (Russia) Anastasia Pavlyuchenkova / (Kazakhstan) Elena Rybakina → replaced by (United States) Emina Bektas / (United Kingdom) Tara Moore

== See also ==
- 2021 US Open – Day-by-day summaries
