= 2021 US Open – Day-by-day summaries =

Tennis tournament match results

The 2021 US Open described in detail, in the form of day-by-day summaries.

== Day 1 (August 30) ==
- Seeds out:
  - Men's Singles: (United States) John Isner [19], (France) Ugo Humbert [23], (United Kingdom) Cameron Norrie [26], (Spain) Alejandro Davidovich Fokina [29], (Croatia) Marin Čilić [30], (Serbia) Filip Krajinović [32]
  - Women's Singles: (Kazakhstan) Yulia Putintseva [31]
- Schedule of Play

Matches on main courts
Matches on Arthur Ashe Stadium
Event	Winner	Loser	Score
Women's Singles 1st Round	(United States) Sloane Stephens	(United States) Madison Keys	6–3, 1–6, 7–6^{(9–7)}
Men's Singles 1st Round	(Greece) Stefanos Tsitsipas [3]	(United Kingdom) Andy Murray	2–6, 7–6^{(9–7)}, 3–6, 6–3, 6–4
2021 US Open Opening Night Ceremony
Women's Singles 1st Round	(Japan) Naomi Osaka [3]	(Czech Republic) Marie Bouzková	6–4, 6–1
Men's Singles 1st Round	(Russia) Daniil Medvedev [2]	(France) Richard Gasquet	6–4, 6–3, 6–1
Matches on Louis Armstrong Stadium
Event	Winner	Loser	Score
Women's Singles 1st Round	(Spain) Garbiñe Muguruza [9]	(Croatia) Donna Vekić	7–6^{(7–4)}, 7–6^{(7–5)}
Men's Singles 1st Round	(United States) Brandon Nakashima [WC]	(United States) John Isner [19]	7–6^{(9–7)}, 7–6^{(8–6)}, 6–3
Women's Singles 1st Round	(United States) Coco Gauff [21]	(Poland) Magda Linette	5–7, 6–3, 6–4
Women's Singles 1st Round	(Belarus) Aryna Sabalenka [2]	(Serbia) Nina Stojanović	6–4, 6–7^{(4–7)}, 6–0
Men's Singles 1st Round	(Spain) Roberto Bautista Agut [18]	(Australia) Nick Kyrgios	6–3, 6–4, 6–0
Matches on Grandstand
Event	Winner	Loser	Score
Women's Singles 1st Round	(Romania) Simona Halep [12]	(Italy) Camila Giorgi	6–4, 7–6^{(7–3)}
Men's Singles 1st Round	(Russia) Andrey Rublev [5]	(Croatia) Ivo Karlović [Q]	6–3, 7–6^{(7–3)}, 6–3
Men's Singles 1st Round	(Norway) Casper Ruud [8]	(Japan) Yūichi Sugita [LL]	6–3, 6–2, 6–2
Women's Singles 1st Round	(Belarus) Victoria Azarenka [18]	(Czech Republic) Tereza Martincová	6–4, 6–0
Women's Singles 1st Round	(Tunisia) Ons Jabeur [20]	(France) Alizé Cornet	7–5, 7–5
Matches start at 12 pm (Arthur Ashe Stadium) and 11am (other courts), night session starts at 7pm Eastern Daylight Time (EDT)

== Day 2 (August 31) ==
- Seeds out:
  - Men's Singles: (Spain) Pablo Carreño Busta [9], (Australia) Alex de Minaur [14], (Italy) Lorenzo Sonego [20], (Russia) Karen Khachanov [25], (Belgium) David Goffin [27], (Italy) Fabio Fognini [28]
  - Women's Singles: (Czech Republic) Karolína Muchová [22], (Russia) Veronika Kudermetova [29]
- Schedule of Play

Matches on main courts
Matches on Arthur Ashe Stadium
Event	Winner	Loser	Score
Men's Singles 1st Round	(Germany) Alexander Zverev [4]	(United States) Sam Querrey	6–4, 7–5, 6–2
Women's Singles 1st Round	(Australia) Ashleigh Barty [1]	(Russia) Vera Zvonareva	6–1, 7–6^{(9–7)}
Men's Singles 1st Round	(Serbia) Novak Djokovic [1]	(Denmark) Holger Rune [Q]	6–1, 6–7^{(5–7)}, 6–2, 6–1
Women's Singles 1st Round	(Canada) Bianca Andreescu [6]	(Switzerland) Viktorija Golubic	7–5, 4–6, 7–5
Matches on Louis Armstrong Stadium
Event	Winner	Loser	Score
Women's Singles 1st Round	(Czech Republic) Karolína Plíšková [4]	(United States) Caty McNally [WC]	6–3, 6–4
Women's Singles 1st Round (Note: This match was originally scheduled to play on Court 14 but was moved to Louis Armstrong Stadium following Jennifer Brady's withdrawal from the tournament. The originally scheduled match later moved to Court 17.)	(Switzerland) Belinda Bencic [11]	(Netherlands) Arantxa Rus	6–4, 6–4
Men's Singles 1st Round	(Canada) Denis Shapovalov [7]	(Argentina) Federico Delbonis	6–2, 6–2, 6–3
Women's Singles 1st Round	(Russia) Anastasia Pavlyuchenkova [14]	(United States) Alison Riske	6–4, 6–2
Men's Singles 1st Round	(United States) Taylor Fritz	(Australia) Alex de Minaur [14]	7–6^{(7–4)}, 6–2, 1–6, 6–4
Matches on Grandstand
Event	Winner	Loser	Score
Men's Singles 1st Round	(Japan) Kei Nishikori	(Italy) Salvatore Caruso	6–1, 6–1, 5–7, 6–3
Men's Singles 1st Round	(Italy) Matteo Berrettini [6]	(France) Jérémy Chardy	7–6^{(7–5)}, 7–6^{(9–7)}, 6–3
Women's Singles 1st Round	(Poland) Iga Świątek [7]	(United States) Jamie Loeb [Q]	6–3, 6–4
Women's Singles 1st Round	(Czech Republic) Petra Kvitová [10]	(Slovenia) Polona Hercog	6–1, 6–2
Colored background indicates a night match
Matches start at 12 pm (Arthur Ashe Stadium) and 11am (other courts), night session starts at 7pm Eastern Daylight Time (EDT)

== Day 3 (September 1) ==
Half of the matches were played as scheduled, with the remaining matches on outer courts and Louis Armstrong Stadium postponed due to heavy rain caused by the remnants of Hurricane Ida.

- Seeds out:
  - Men's Singles: (Norway) Casper Ruud [8], (Bulgaria) Grigor Dimitrov [15], (Chile) Cristian Garín [16]
  - Women's Singles: (United States) Coco Gauff [21], (Russia) Ekaterina Alexandrova [32]
- Schedule of Play

Matches on main courts
Matches on Arthur Ashe Stadium
Event	Winner	Loser	Score
Women's Singles 2nd Round	(Japan) Naomi Osaka [3]	(Serbia) Olga Danilović [Q]	Walkover
Women's Singles 2nd Round (Note: This match was originally scheduled to play on Court 17 but was moved to Arthur Ashe Stadium following Danilović's withdrawal.)	(Romania) Simona Halep [12]	(Slovakia) Kristína Kučová [LL]	6–3, 6–1
Men's Singles 2nd Round	(Russia) Daniil Medvedev [2]	(Germany) Dominik Koepfer	6–4, 6–1, 6–2
Women's Singles 2nd Round	(United States) Sloane Stephens	(United States) Coco Gauff [21]	6–4, 6–2
Men's Singles 2nd Round	(Greece) Stefanos Tsitsipas [3]	(France) Adrian Mannarino	6–3, 6–4, 6–7^{(4–7)}, 6–0
Men's Singles 2nd Round (Note: This match started on Louis Armstrong Stadium, as planned, but with Schwartzman leading 1–0 in the second set, the match was suspended due to rain. The match moved to Arthur Ashe Stadium following the conclusion of the Mannarino-Tsitsipas match, where it was finished the same night.)	(Argentina) Diego Schwartzman [11]	(South Africa) Kevin Anderson	7–6^{(7–4)}, 6–3, 6–4
Matches on Louis Armstrong Stadium
Event	Winner	Loser	Score
Women's Singles 2nd Round	(Spain) Garbiñe Muguruza [9]	(Germany) Andrea Petkovic	6–4, 6–2
Women's Singles 2nd Round	(Belarus) Victoria Azarenka [18]	(Italy) Jasmine Paolini	6–3, 7–6^{(7–1)}
Men's Singles 2nd Round	(United States) Frances Tiafoe	(Argentina) Guido Pella	6–1, 6–2, 7–5
Women's Singles 2nd Round (Note: This match started on Court 13, as planned, but with Krejčíková leading 2–1 in the second set, the match was suspended due to rain. The match moved to Louis Armstrong Stadium following the conclusion of the Tiafoe-Pella match, where it was finished the same day.)	(Czech Republic) Barbora Krejčíková [8]	(United States) Christina McHale	6–3, 6–1
Women's Singles 2nd Round	(Germany) Angelique Kerber [16] vs. (Ukraine) Anhelina Kalinina		Postponed
Matches on Grandstand
Event	Winner	Loser	Score
Men's Singles 2nd Round	(Russia) Andrey Rublev [5]	(Spain) Pedro Martínez	7–6^{(7–2)}, 6–7^{(5–7)}, 6–1, 6–1
Women's Singles 2nd Round	(Belarus) Aryna Sabalenka [2]	(Slovenia) Tamara Zidanšek	6–3, 6–1
Men's Doubles 1st Round	(United States) Steve Johnson / (United States) Sam Querrey [WC] vs. (El Salvador) Marcelo Arévalo / (Netherlands) Matwé Middelkoop		2–1, suspended
Men's Doubles 1st Round	(Croatia) Nikola Mektić / (Croatia) Mate Pavić [1] vs. (United States) Nathaniel Lammons / (United States) Jackson Withrow [WC]		Postponed
Colored background indicates a night match
Matches start at 12 pm (Arthur Ashe Stadium) and 11am (other courts), night session starts at 7pm Eastern Daylight Time (EDT)

== Day 4 (September 2) ==
Due to heavy rain associated with Hurricane Ida from the previous night, play was delayed one hour and began at 12:00 pm EDT.

- Seeds out:
  - Men's Singles: (Poland) Hubert Hurkacz [10], (Kazakhstan) Alexander Bublik [31]
  - Women's Singles: (Spain) Paula Badosa [24], (Croatia) Petra Martić [30]
  - Men's Doubles: (Croatia) Nikola Mektić / (Croatia) Mate Pavić [1], (Colombia) Juan Sebastián Cabal / (Colombia) Robert Farah [5], (Poland) Łukasz Kubot / (Brazil) Marcelo Melo [9], (Germany) Tim Pütz / (New Zealand) Michael Venus [12]
  - Women's Doubles: (Czech Republic) Barbora Krejčíková / (Czech Republic) Kateřina Siniaková [2], (United States) Nicole Melichar-Martinez / (Netherlands) Demi Schuurs [4], (United States) Asia Muhammad / (United States) Jessica Pegula [13]
  - Mixed Doubles: (Brazil) Luisa Stefani / (Brazil) Marcelo Melo [4]
- Schedule of Play

Matches on main courts
Matches on Arthur Ashe Stadium
Event	Winner	Loser	Score
Women's Singles 2nd Round	(Australia) Ashleigh Barty [1]	(Denmark) Clara Tauson	6–1, 7–5
Men's Singles 2nd Round	(Germany) Alexander Zverev [4]	(Spain) Albert Ramos Viñolas	6–1, 6–0, 6–3
Women's Singles 2nd Round (Note: This match was originally scheduled to play on Grandstand but was moved to Arthur Ashe Stadium after the conclusion of the Zverev-Ramos Viñolas match.)	(Germany) Angelique Kerber [16]	(Ukraine) Anhelina Kalinina	6–3, 6–2
Men's Singles 2nd Round	(Serbia) Novak Djokovic [1]	(Netherlands) Tallon Griekspoor	6–2, 6–3, 6–2
Women's Singles 2nd Round	(Czech Republic) Karolína Plíšková [4]	(United States) Amanda Anisimova	7–5, 6–7^{(5–7)}, 7–6^{(9–7)}
Matches on Louis Armstrong Stadium
Event	Winner	Loser	Score
Women's Singles 2nd Round	(Switzerland) Belinda Bencic [11]	(Italy) Martina Trevisan	6–3, 6–1
Women's Singles 2nd Round	(Czech Republic) Petra Kvitová [10]	(Czech Republic) Kristýna Plíšková [Q]	7–6^{(7–4)}, 6–2
Men's Singles 2nd Round	(France) Gaël Monfils [17]	(United States) Steve Johnson	7–5, 4–6, 6–4, 6–4
Women's Singles 2nd Round	(Canada) Bianca Andreescu [6]	(United States) Lauren Davis	6–4, 6–4
Men's Singles 2nd Round	(Canada) Denis Shapovalov [7]	(Spain) Roberto Carballés Baena	7–6^{(9–7)}, 6–3, 6–0
Matches on Grandstand
Event	Winner	Loser	Score
Women's Singles 2nd Round	(Greece) Maria Sakkari [17]	(Czech Republic) Kateřina Siniaková	6–4, 6–2
Men's Singles 2nd Round	(Italy) Matteo Berrettini [6]	(France) Corentin Moutet	7–6^{(7–2)}, 4–6, 6–4, 6–3
Men's Singles 2nd Round	(United States) Jenson Brooksby [WC]	(United States) Taylor Fritz	6–7^{(7–9)}, 7–6^{(12–10)}, 7–5, 6–2
Colored background indicates a night match
Matches start at 12 pm, night session starts at 7pm Eastern Daylight Time (EDT)

== Day 5 (September 3) ==
- Seeds out:
  - Men's Singles: (Greece) Stefanos Tsitsipas [3], (Russia) Andrey Rublev [5], (Spain) Roberto Bautista Agut [18]
  - Women's Singles: (Japan) Naomi Osaka [3], (Belarus) Victoria Azarenka [18], (Kazakhstan) Elena Rybakina [19], (Tunisia) Ons Jabeur [20], (Russia) Daria Kasatkina [25], (United States) Danielle Collins [26]
  - Women's Doubles: (Australia) Ellen Perez / (Czech Republic) Květa Peschke [16], (Serbia) Aleksandra Krunić / (Serbia) Nina Stojanović [17]
  - Mixed Doubles: (United States) Bethanie Mattek-Sands / (United Kingdom) Jamie Murray [5], (Chinese Taipei) Chan Hao-ching / (New Zealand) Michael Venus [7]
- Schedule of Play

Matches on main courts
Matches on Arthur Ashe Stadium
Event	Winner	Loser	Score
Women's Singles 3rd Round	(Spain) Garbiñe Muguruza [9]	(Belarus) Victoria Azarenka [18]	6–4, 3–6, 6–2
Men's Singles 3rd Round	(Spain) Carlos Alcaraz	(Greece) Stefanos Tsitsipas [3]	6–3, 4–6, 7–6^{(7–2)}, 0–6, 7–6^{(7–5)}
Women's Singles 3rd Round	(Canada) Leylah Fernandez	(Japan) Naomi Osaka [3]	5–7, 7–6^{(7–2)}, 6–4
Men's Singles 3rd Round	(United States) Frances Tiafoe	(Russia) Andrey Rublev [5]	4–6, 6–3, 7–6^{(8–6)}, 4–6, 6–1
Matches on Louis Armstrong Stadium
Event	Winner	Loser	Score
Women's Singles 3rd Round	(Romania) Simona Halep [12]	(Kazakhstan) Elena Rybakina [19]	7–6^{(13–11)}, 4–6, 6–3
Men's Singles 3rd Round	(Russia) Daniil Medvedev [2]	(Spain) Pablo Andújar	6–0, 6–4, 6–3
Women's Singles 3rd Round	(Germany) Angelique Kerber [16]	(United States) Sloane Stephens	5–7, 6–2, 6–3
Men's Singles 3rd Round	(Canada) Félix Auger-Aliassime [12]	(Spain) Roberto Bautista Agut [18]	6–3, 6–4, 4–6, 3–6, 6–3
Women's Singles 3rd Round	(Belarus) Aryna Sabalenka [2]	(United States) Danielle Collins [26]	6–3, 6–3
Matches on Grandstand
Event	Winner	Loser	Score
Men's Singles 3rd Round	(Germany) Peter Gojowczyk [Q]	(Switzerland) Henri Laaksonen [Q]	3–6, 6–3, 6–1, 6–4
Women's Singles 3rd Round	(Czech Republic) Barbora Krejčíková [8]	(Russia) Kamilla Rakhimova [LL]	6–4, 6–2
Women's Singles 3rd Round	(Ukraine) Elina Svitolina [5]	(Russia) Daria Kasatkina [25]	6–4, 6–2
Men's Singles 3rd Round	(Argentina) Diego Schwartzman [11]	(Slovakia) Alex Molčan [Q]	6–4, 6–3, 6–3
Women's Singles 3rd Round (Note: This match was originally scheduled to play on Court 17 but was moved to Grandstand following the Molčan-Schwartzman match.)	(Belgium) Elise Mertens [15]	(Tunisia) Ons Jabeur [20]	6–3, 7–5
Colored background indicates a night match
Matches start at 12 pm at Arthur Ashe Stadium and 11 am in most courts, night session starts at 7pm Eastern Daylight Time (EDT)

== Day 6 (September 4) ==
- Seeds out:
  - Men's Singles: (Canada) Denis Shapovalov [7], (France) Gaël Monfils [17], (Russia) Aslan Karatsev [21]
  - Women's Singles: (Australia) Ashleigh Barty [1], (Czech Republic) Petra Kvitová [10], (United States) Jessica Pegula [23], (Estonia) Anett Kontaveit [28]
  - Men's Doubles: (South Africa) Raven Klaasen / (Japan) Ben McLachlan [11], (Italy) Simone Bolelli / (Argentina) Máximo González [14], (Belgium) Sander Gillé / (Belgium) Joran Vliegen [16]
  - Mixed Doubles: (United States) Nicole Melichar-Martinez / (Croatia) Ivan Dodig [1]
- Schedule of Play

Matches on main courts
Matches on Arthur Ashe Stadium
Event	Winner	Loser	Score
Women's Singles 3rd Round	(Greece) Maria Sakkari [17]	(Czech Republic) Petra Kvitová [10]	6–4, 6–3
Men's Singles 3rd Round	(Serbia) Novak Djokovic [1]	(Japan) Kei Nishikori	6–7^{(4–7)}, 6–3, 6–3, 6–2
Women's Singles 3rd Round	(United States) Shelby Rogers	(Australia) Ashleigh Barty [1]	6–2, 1–6, 7–6^{(7–5)}
Men's Singles 3rd Round	(Germany) Alexander Zverev [4]	(United States) Jack Sock [WC]	3–6, 6–3, 6–2, 2–1, retired
Matches on Louis Armstrong Stadium
Event	Winner	Loser	Score
Women's Singles 3rd Round	(Canada) Bianca Andreescu [6]	(Belgium) Greet Minnen [LL]	6–1, 6–2
Women's Singles 3rd Round	(Switzerland) Belinda Bencic [11]	(United States) Jessica Pegula [23]	6–2, 6–4
Men's Singles 3rd Round	(Italy) Jannik Sinner [13]	(France) Gaël Monfils [17]	7–6^{(7–1)}, 6–2, 4–6, 4–6, 6–4
Men's Singles 3rd Round	(South Africa) Lloyd Harris	(Canada) Denis Shapovalov [7]	6–4, 6–4, 6–4
Women's Singles 3rd Round	(Russia) Anastasia Pavlyuchenkova [14]	(Russia) Varvara Gracheva	6–1, 6–4
Matches on Grandstand
Event	Winner	Loser	Score
Men's Singles 3rd Round	(Italy) Matteo Berrettini [6]	(Belarus) Ilya Ivashka	6–7^{(5–7)}, 6–2, 6–4, 2–6, 6–3
Women's Singles 3rd Round	(Poland) Iga Świątek [7]	(Estonia) Anett Kontaveit [28]	6–3, 4–6, 6–3
Women's Singles 3rd Round	(Czech Republic) Karolína Plíšková [4]	(Australia) Ajla Tomljanović	6–3, 6–2
Men's Singles 3rd Round	(United States) Reilly Opelka [22]	(Georgia (country)) Nikoloz Basilashvili	7–6^{(7–5)}, 6–3, 6–4
Colored background indicates a night match
Matches start at 12 pm at Arthur Ashe Stadium and 11 am in most courts, night session starts at 7pm Eastern Daylight Time (EDT)

== Day 7 (September 5) ==
- Seeds out:
  - Men's Singles: (Argentina) Diego Schwartzman [11], (United Kingdom) Dan Evans [24]
  - Women's Singles: (Spain) Garbiñe Muguruza [9], (Romania) Simona Halep [12], (Belgium) Elise Mertens [15], (Germany) Angelique Kerber [16]
  - Women's Doubles: (Russia) Veronika Kudermetova / (United States) Bethanie Mattek-Sands [6]
  - Mixed Doubles: (Japan) Ena Shibahara / (Japan) Ben McLachlan [6]
- Schedule of Play

Matches on main courts
Matches on Arthur Ashe Stadium
Event	Winner	Loser	Score
Women's Singles 4th Round	(Ukraine) Elina Svitolina [5]	(Romania) Simona Halep [12]	6–3, 6–3
Men's Singles 4th Round	(Russia) Daniil Medvedev [2]	(United Kingdom) Dan Evans [24]	6–3, 6–4, 6–3
Women's Doubles 2nd Round (Note: This match was originally scheduled to play on Grandstand but was moved to Arthur Ashe Stadium following the Evans-Medvedev match.)	(Canada) Gabriela Dabrowski [5] (Brazil) Luisa Stefani [5]	(Croatia) Petra Martić (United States) Shelby Rogers	6–4, 6–7^{(5–7)}, 7–6^{(7–3)}
Men's Singles 4th Round	(Canada) Félix Auger-Aliassime [12]	(United States) Frances Tiafoe	4–6, 6–2, 7–6^{(8–6)}, 6–4
Women's Singles 4th Round	(Czech Republic) Barbora Krejčíková [8]	(Spain) Garbiñe Muguruza [9]	6–3, 7–6^{(7–4)}
Matches on Louis Armstrong Stadium
Event	Winner	Loser	Score
Men's Singles 4th Round	(Netherlands) Botic van de Zandschulp [Q]	(Argentina) Diego Schwartzman [11]	6–3, 6–4, 5–7, 5–7, 6–1
Women's Singles 4th Round	(Canada) Leylah Fernandez	(Germany) Angelique Kerber [16]	4–6, 7–6^{(7–5)}, 6–2
Women's Singles 4th Round	(Belarus) Aryna Sabalenka [2]	(Belgium) Elise Mertens [15]	6–4, 6–1
Matches on Grandstand
Event	Winner	Loser	Score
Women's Doubles 3rd Round	(United States) Caroline Dolehide [10] (Australia) Storm Sanders [10]	(Russia) Veronika Kudermetova [6] (United States) Bethanie Mattek-Sands [6]	4–6, 6–3, 6–2
Men's Doubles 3rd Round	(United States) Steve Johnson [WC] (United States) Sam Querrey [WC]	(Lithuania) Ričardas Berankis (France) Benoît Paire	6–3, 6–4
Men's Singles 4th Round	(Spain) Carlos Alcaraz	(Germany) Peter Gojowczyk [Q]	5–7, 6–1, 5–7, 6–2, 6–0
Colored background indicates a night match
Matches start at 12 pm at Arthur Ashe Stadium and 11 am in most courts, night session starts at 7pm Eastern Daylight Time (EDT)

== Day 8 (September 6) ==
- Seeds out:
  - Men's Singles: (Italy) Jannik Sinner [13], (United States) Reilly Opelka [22]
  - Women's Singles: (Canada) Bianca Andreescu [6], (Poland) Iga Świątek [7], (Russia) Anastasia Pavlyuchenkova [14]
  - Men's Doubles: (Netherlands) Wesley Koolhof / (Netherlands) Jean-Julien Rojer [10], (India) Rohan Bopanna / (Croatia) Ivan Dodig [13], (Kazakhstan) Andrey Golubev / (Germany) Andreas Mies [15]
  - Women's Doubles: (Japan) Ena Shibahara / (Japan) Shuko Aoyama [3], (Croatia) Darija Jurak / (Slovenia) Andreja Klepač [8], (Ukraine) Nadiia Kichenok / (Romania) Raluca Olaru [12]
- Schedule of Play

Matches on main courts
Matches on Arthur Ashe Stadium
Event	Winner	Loser	Score
Men's Singles 4th Round	(Germany) Alexander Zverev [4]	(Italy) Jannik Sinner [13]	6–4, 6–4, 7–6^{(9–7)}
Women's Singles 4th Round	(United Kingdom) Emma Raducanu [Q]	(United States) Shelby Rogers	6–2, 6–1
Men's Singles 4th Round	(Serbia) Novak Djokovic [1]	(United States) Jenson Brooksby [WC]	1–6, 6–3, 6–2, 6–2
Women's Singles 4th Round	(Greece) Maria Sakkari [17]	(Canada) Bianca Andreescu [6]	6–7^{(2–7)}, 7–6^{(8–6)}, 6–3
Matches on Louis Armstrong Stadium
Event	Winner	Loser	Score
Women's Singles 4th Round	(Switzerland) Belinda Bencic [11]	(Poland) Iga Świątek [7]	7–6^{(14–12)}, 6–3
Men's Singles 4th Round	(South Africa) Lloyd Harris	(United States) Reilly Opelka [22]	6–7^{(6–8)}, 6–4, 6–1, 6–3
Men's Singles 4th Round	(Italy) Matteo Berrettini [6]	(Germany) Oscar Otte [Q]	6–4, 3–6, 6–3, 6–2
Matches on Grandstand
Event	Winner	Loser	Score
Men's Doubles 3rd Round	(United States) Rajeev Ram [4] (United Kingdom) Joe Salisbury [4]	(India) Rohan Bopanna [13] (Croatia) Ivan Dodig [13]	6–7^{(4–7)}, 6–4, 7–6^{(7–3)}
Men's Doubles 3rd Round	(France) Pierre-Hugues Herbert [3] (France) Nicolas Mahut [3]	(Kazakhstan) Andrey Golubev [15] (Germany) Andreas Mies [15]	4–6, 7–5, 6–3
Women's Doubles 3rd Round	(United States) Coco Gauff [11] (United States) Caty McNally [11]	(Croatia) Darija Jurak [8] (Slovenia) Andreja Klepač [8]	6–4, 6–4
Women's Singles 4th Round	(Czech Republic) Karolína Plíšková [4]	(Russia) Anastasia Pavlyuchenkova [14]	7–5, 6–4
Colored background indicates a night match
Matches start at 12 pm at Arthur Ashe Stadium and 11 am in most courts, night session starts at 7pm Eastern Daylight Time (EDT)

== Day 9 (September 7) ==
- Seeds out:
  - Women's Singles: (Ukraine) Elina Svitolina [5], (Czech Republic) Barbora Krejčíková [8]
  - Men's Doubles: (Spain) Marcel Granollers / (Argentina) Horacio Zeballos [2], (France) Pierre-Hugues Herbert / (France) Nicolas Mahut [3], (Germany) Kevin Krawietz / (Romania) Horia Tecău [6]
  - Women's Doubles: (United States) Caroline Dolehide / (Australia) Storm Sanders [10]
  - Mixed Doubles: (Chile) Alexa Guarachi / (United Kingdom) Neal Skupski [3], (Netherlands) Demi Schuurs / (Belgium) Sander Gillé [8]
- Schedule of Play

Matches on main courts
Matches on Arthur Ashe Stadium
Event	Winner	Loser	Score
Men's Singles Quarterfinals	(Russia) Daniil Medvedev [2]	(Netherlands) Botic van de Zandschulp [Q]	6–3, 6–0, 4–6, 7–5
Women's Singles Quarterfinals	(Canada) Leylah Fernandez	(Ukraine) Elina Svitolina [5]	6–3, 3–6, 7–6^{(7–5)}
Women's Singles Quarterfinals	(Belarus) Aryna Sabalenka [2]	(Czech Republic) Barbora Krejčíková [8]	6–4, 6–1
Men's Singles Quarterfinals	(Canada) Félix Auger-Aliassime [12]	(Spain) Carlos Alcaraz	6–3, 3–1, retired
Matches on Louis Armstrong Stadium
Event	Winner	Loser	Score
Mixed Doubles Quarterfinals	(Mexico) Giuliana Olmos (El Salvador) Marcelo Arévalo	(Australia) Ellen Perez (Brazil) Marcelo Demoliner	3–6, 6–3, [10–4]
Women's Doubles Quarterfinals	(Australia) Samantha Stosur [14] (China) Zhang Shuai [14]	(United States) Caroline Dolehide [10] (Australia) Storm Sanders [10]	6–2, 6–3
Mixed Doubles Quarterfinals	(United States) Jessica Pegula (United States) Austin Krajicek	(Chile) Alexa Guarachi [3] (United Kingdom) Neal Skupski [3]	6–1, 6–3
Men's Doubles Quarterfinals	(United States) Steve Johnson [WC] (United States) Sam Querrey [WC]	(Germany) Kevin Krawietz [6] (Romania) Horia Tecău [6]	6–2, 7–6^{(7–5)}
Matches on Grandstand
Event	Winner	Loser	Score
Girls' Singles 2nd Round	(Croatia) Petra Marčinko	(United States) Ashlyn Krueger [16]	3–6, 6–4, 6–4
Boys' Singles 2nd Round	(United States) Samir Banerjee [2]	(Germany) Max Hans Rehberg	6–0, 6–4
Men's Doubles Quarterfinals	(United States) Rajeev Ram [4] (United Kingdom) Joe Salisbury [4]	(Australia) Max Purcell (Australia) Matthew Ebden	7–6^{(9–7)}, 6–7^{(6–8)}, 7–6^{(12–10)}
Men's Doubles Quarterfinals	(United Kingdom) Jamie Murray [7] (Brazil) Bruno Soares [7]	(Spain) Marcel Granollers [2] (Argentina) Horacio Zeballos [2]	6–7^{(5–7)}, 6–4, 6–4
Mixed Doubles Quarterfinals	(United States) Desirae Krawczyk [2] (United Kingdom) Joe Salisbury [2]	(Netherlands) Demi Schuurs [8] (Belgium) Sander Gillé [8]	6–1, 1–6, [10–7]
Colored background indicates a night match
Matches start at 12 pm at Arthur Ashe Stadium and 11 am in most courts, night session starts at 7pm Eastern Daylight Time (EDT)

== Day 10 (September 8) ==
- Seeds out:
  - Men's Singles: (Italy) Matteo Berrettini [6]
  - Women's Singles: (Czech Republic) Karolína Plíšková [4], (Switzerland) Belinda Bencic [11]
  - Women's Doubles: (Chinese Taipei) Hsieh Su-wei / (Belgium) Elise Mertens [1], (Czech Republic) Marie Bouzková / (Czech Republic) Lucie Hradecká [15]
- Schedule of Play

Matches on main courts
Matches on Arthur Ashe Stadium
Event	Winner	Loser	Score
Women's Singles Quarterfinals	(United Kingdom) Emma Raducanu [Q]	(Switzerland) Belinda Bencic [11]	6–3, 6–4
Men's Singles Quarterfinals	(Germany) Alexander Zverev [4]	(South Africa) Lloyd Harris	7–6^{(8–6)}, 6–3, 6–4
Women's Singles Quarterfinals	(Greece) Maria Sakkari [17]	(Czech Republic) Karolína Plíšková [4]	6–4, 6–4
Men's Singles Quarterfinals	(Serbia) Novak Djokovic [1]	(Italy) Matteo Berrettini [6]	5–7, 6–2, 6–2, 6–3
Matches on Louis Armstrong Stadium
Event	Winner	Loser	Score
Women's Doubles Quarterfinals	(Canada) Gabriela Dabrowski [5] (Brazil) Luisa Stefani [5]	(Czech Republic) Marie Bouzková [15] (Czech Republic) Lucie Hradecká [15]	6–4, 4–6, 6–1
Mixed Doubles Semifinals	(Mexico) Giuliana Olmos (El Salvador) Marcelo Arévalo	(Ukraine) Dayana Yastremska [Alt] (Australia) Max Purcell [Alt]	4–6, 6–4 [10–6]
Women's Doubles Quarterfinals	(United States) Coco Gauff [11] (United States) Caty McNally [11]	(Chinese Taipei) Hsieh Su-wei [1] (Belgium) Elise Mertens [1]	6–3, 7–6^{(7–1)}
Women's Doubles Quarterfinals	(Chile) Alexa Guarachi [7] (United States) Desirae Krawczyk [7]	(Romania) Monica Niculescu (Romania) Elena-Gabriela Ruse	6–7^{(5–7)}, 6–2, 6–3
Colored background indicates a night match
Matches start at 12 pm at Arthur Ashe Stadium and 11 am in most courts, night session starts at 7pm Eastern Daylight Time (EDT)

== Day 11 (September 9) ==
- Seeds out:
  - Women's Singles: (Belarus) Aryna Sabalenka [2], (Greece) Maria Sakkari [17]
  - Men's Doubles: (Australia) John Peers / (Slovakia) Filip Polášek [8]
- Schedule of Play

Matches on main courts
Matches on Arthur Ashe Stadium
Event	Winner	Loser	Score
Women's Singles Semifinals	(Canada) Leylah Fernandez	(Belarus) Aryna Sabalenka [2]	7–6^{(7–3)}, 4–6, 6–4
Women's Singles Semifinals	(United Kingdom) Emma Raducanu [Q]	(Greece) Maria Sakkari [17]	6–1, 6–4
Matches on Louis Armstrong Stadium
Event	Winner	Loser	Score
Men's Doubles Semifinals	(United States) Rajeev Ram [4] (United Kingdom) Joe Salisbury [4]	(United States) Steve Johnson [WC] (United States) Sam Querrey [WC]	7–6^{(7–5)}, 6–4
Men's Doubles Semifinals	(United Kingdom) Jamie Murray [7] (Brazil) Bruno Soares [7]	(Australia) John Peers [8] (Slovakia) Filip Polášek [8]	6–3, 3–6, 6–4
Wheelchair Men's Singles Quarterfinals (Note: This match started on Court 11, but with Ratzlaff leading 1–0 in the first set, it was suspended due to rain. The match moved to Louis Armstrong Stadium following the conclusion of the two men's doubles semifinals.)	(Japan) Shingo Kunieda [1]	(United States) Casey Ratzlaff [WC]	6–1, 6–0
Wheelchair Men's Singles Quarterfinals (Note: This match started on Court 14, but with Reid leading 1–0 in the first set, it was suspended due to rain. The match moved to Louis Armstrong Stadium following the conclusion of the Kunieda-Ratzlaff match.)	(United Kingdom) Gordon Reid	(Netherlands) Tom Egberink	6–1, 6–4
Colored background indicates a night match
Matches start at 12 pm, night session starts at 7pm Eastern Daylight Time (EDT)

== Day 12 (September 10) ==
- Seeds out:
  - Men's Singles: (Germany) Alexander Zverev [4], (Canada) Félix Auger-Aliassime [12]
  - Men's Doubles: (United Kingdom) Jamie Murray / (Brazil) Bruno Soares [7]
  - Women's Doubles: (Canada) Gabriela Dabrowski / (Brazil) Luisa Stefani [5], (Chile) Alexa Guarachi / (United States) Desirae Krawczyk [7]
- Schedule of Play

Matches on main courts
Matches on Arthur Ashe Stadium
Event	Winner	Loser	Score
Men's Doubles Final	(United States) Rajeev Ram [4] (United Kingdom) Joe Salisbury [4]	(United Kingdom) Jamie Murray [7] (Brazil) Bruno Soares [7]	3–6, 6–2, 6–2
Men's Singles Semifinals	(Russia) Daniil Medvedev [2]	(Canada) Félix Auger-Aliassime [12]	6–4, 7–5, 6–2
Men's Singles Semifinals	(Serbia) Novak Djokovic [1]	(Germany) Alexander Zverev [4]	4–6, 6–2, 6–4, 4–6, 6–2
Matches on Louis Armstrong Stadium
Event	Winner	Loser	Score
Women's Doubles Semifinals	(Australia) Samantha Stosur [14] (China) Zhang Shuai [14]	(Chile) Alexa Guarachi [7] (United States) Desirae Krawczyk [7]	6–2, 7–5
Women's Doubles Semifinals	(United States) Coco Gauff [11] (United States) Caty McNally [11]	(Canada) Gabriela Dabrowski [5] (Brazil) Luisa Stefani [5]	6–6^{(1–2)}, retired
Mixed Doubles Semifinals	(United States) Desirae Krawczyk [2] (United Kingdom) Joe Salisbury [2]	(United States) Jessica Pegula (United States) Austin Krajicek	7–6^{(7–2)}, 6–4
Wheelchair Men's Doubles Semifinals	(Argentina) Gustavo Fernández (Japan) Shingo Kunieda	(France) Stéphane Houdet [2] (France) Nicolas Peifer [2]	6–4, 6–4
Colored background indicates a night match
Matches start at 12 pm, night session starts at 7pm Eastern Daylight Time (EDT)

== Day 13 (September 11) ==
- Schedule of Play

Matches on main courts
Matches on Arthur Ashe Stadium
Event	Winner	Loser	Score
Mixed Doubles Final	(United States) Desirae Krawczyk [2] (United Kingdom) Joe Salisbury [2]	(Mexico) Giuliana Olmos (El Salvador) Marcelo Arévalo	7–5, 6–2
Women's Singles Final	(United Kingdom) Emma Raducanu [Q]	(Canada) Leylah Fernandez	6–4, 6–3
Matches on Louis Armstrong Stadium
Event	Winner	Loser	Score
Wheelchair Quad Singles Semifinals	(Australia) Dylan Alcott [1]	(Japan) Koji Sugeno	6–2, 6–1
Wheelchair Men's Doubles Final	(United Kingdom) Alfie Hewett [1] (United Kingdom) Gordon Reid [1]	(Argentina) Gustavo Fernández (Japan) Shingo Kunieda	6–2, 6–1
Wheelchair Quad Doubles Final	(Netherlands) Sam Schröder (Netherlands) Niels Vink	(Australia) Dylan Alcott [1] (Australia) Heath Davidson [1]	6–3, 6–2
Matches start at 1 pm Eastern Daylight Time (EDT)

== Day 14 (September 12) ==
- Seeds out:
  - Men's Singles: (Serbia) Novak Djokovic [1]
  - Women's Doubles: (United States) Coco Gauff / (United States) Caty McNally [11]
- Schedule of Play

Matches on main courts
Matches on Arthur Ashe Stadium
Event	Winner	Loser	Score
Women's Doubles Final	(Australia) Samantha Stosur [14] (China) Zhang Shuai [14]	(United States) Coco Gauff [11] (United States) Caty McNally [11]	6–3, 3–6, 6–3
Men's Singles Final	(Russia) Daniil Medvedev [2]	(Serbia) Novak Djokovic [1]	6–4, 6–4, 6–4
Matches on Louis Armstrong Stadium
Event	Winner	Loser	Score
Wheelchair Women's Singles Final	(Netherlands) Diede de Groot [1]	(Japan) Yui Kamiji [2]	6–3, 6–2
Wheelchair Quad Singles Final	(Australia) Dylan Alcott [1]	(Netherlands) Niels Vink	7–5, 6–2
Colored background indicates a night match
Matches start at 1 pm Eastern Daylight Time (EDT)
