= 2021 US Open – Men's singles =

Tennis tournament

Men's singles
- 2021 US Open

Final
- Champion: (Russia) Daniil Medvedev
- Runner-up: (Serbia) Novak Djokovic
- Score: 6–4, 6–4, 6–4

Details
- Draw: 128 (16Q / 8WC)
- Seeds: 32

Events
Singles	men	women		boys	girls
Doubles	men	women	mixed	boys	girls
WC Singles	men	women	quad
WC Doubles	men	women	quad
Legends	men	women	mixed
← 2020 ·	US Open	· 2022 →

Daniil Medvedev defeated Novak Djokovic in the final, 6–4, 6–4, 6–4 to win the men's singles tennis title at the 2021 US Open. It was his first major title. Medvedev was the third Russian man, after Yevgeny Kafelnikov and Marat Safin, to win a major singles title.

Dominic Thiem was the reigning champion, but did not participate due to an ongoing wrist injury. This wrist injury would eventually lead to his retirement from the sport in 2024.

Djokovic was aiming to become the second man in the Open Era, after Rod Laver in 1969, to complete the Grand Slam. He was also attempting to win an outright record 21st major singles title and surpass his Big Three counterparts, Roger Federer and Rafael Nadal. By reaching the final, Djokovic tied Federer's record of 31 men's singles major finals contested, and repeated his 2015 achievement of reaching all four major finals in a season. This marked Djokovic's sixth runner-up finish at the event, the most at a men's singles major and ATP Tour event overall.

By defeating world No. 3 Stefanos Tsitsipas in the third round, Carlos Alcaraz became the youngest man to beat a top 3 ranked-player in singles at the US Open since the inception of the ATP rankings in 1973. He was the youngest male quarterfinalist at a singles major since Michael Chang at the 1989 French Open, and the youngest at the US Open in the Open Era; he would win the title the following year. Botic van de Zandschulp was the first Dutchman to reach a singles major quarterfinal since Sjeng Schalken at the 2004 Wimbledon Championships and the first qualifier to do so at the US Open since Gilles Müller in 2008.

== Seeds ==
1. (Serbia) Novak Djokovic (final)
2. (Russia) Daniil Medvedev (champion)
3. (Greece) Stefanos Tsitsipas (third round)
4. (Germany) Alexander Zverev (semifinals)
5. (Russia) Andrey Rublev (third round)
6. (Italy) Matteo Berrettini (quarterfinals)
7. (Canada) Denis Shapovalov (third round)
8. (Norway) Casper Ruud (second round)
9. (Spain) Pablo Carreño Busta (first round)
10. (Poland) Hubert Hurkacz (second round)
11. (Argentina) Diego Schwartzman (fourth round)
12. (Canada) Félix Auger-Aliassime (semifinals)
13. (Italy) Jannik Sinner (fourth round)
14. (Australia) Alex de Minaur (first round)
15. (Bulgaria) Grigor Dimitrov (second round, retired)
16. (Chile) Cristian Garín (second round)

17. (France) Gaël Monfils (third round)
18. (Spain) Roberto Bautista Agut (third round)
19. (United States) John Isner (first round)
20. (Italy) Lorenzo Sonego (first round)
21. (Russia) Aslan Karatsev (third round)
22. (United States) Reilly Opelka (fourth round)
23. (France) Ugo Humbert (first round)
24. (United Kingdom) Daniel Evans (fourth round)
25. (Russia) Karen Khachanov (first round)
26. (United Kingdom) Cameron Norrie (first round)
27. (Belgium) David Goffin (first round)
28. (Italy) Fabio Fognini (first round)
29. (Spain) Alejandro Davidovich Fokina (first round)
30. (Croatia) Marin Čilić (first round, retired)
31. (Kazakhstan) Alexander Bublik (second round)
32. (Serbia) Filip Krajinović (first round)

Click on the seed number of a player to go to their draw section.

== Draw ==
Key

- Q = Qualifier
- WC = Wild card
- LL = Lucky loser
- Alt = Alternate
- ITF = ITF entry
- PR = Protected ranking
- SR = Special ranking
- SE = Special exempt
- JE = Junior exempt
- JR = Junior Accelerator Programme entrant
- CO = College Accelerator Programme entrant
- NG = Next Gen Accelerator Program entrant
- w/o = Walkover
- r = Retired
- d = Defaulted

=== Finals ===
Quarterfinals
1	(Serbia) Novak Djokovic	5	6	6	6
6	(Italy) Matteo Berrettini	7	2	2	3
4	(Germany) Alexander Zverev	7^{8}	6	6
(South Africa) Lloyd Harris	6^{6}	3	4
12	(Canada) Félix Auger-Aliassime	6	3
(Spain) Carlos Alcaraz	3	1^{r}
Q	(Netherlands) Botic van de Zandschulp	3	0	6	5
2	(Russia) Daniil Medvedev	6	6	4	7

Semifinals
1	(Serbia) Novak Djokovic	4	6	6	4	6
4	(Germany) Alexander Zverev	6	2	4	6	2
12	(Canada) Félix Auger-Aliassime	4	5	2
2	(Russia) Daniil Medvedev	6	7	6

Final
1	(Serbia) Novak Djokovic	4	4	4
2	(Russia) Daniil Medvedev	6	6	6

=== Top half ===
==== Section 1 ====
First round
1	(Serbia) N Djokovic	6	6^{5}	6	6
Q	(Denmark) H Rune	1	7^{7}	2	1
(Netherlands) T Griekspoor	2	7^{7}	4	6	7
(Germany) J-L Struff	6	6^{3}	6	4	5
(Italy) S Caruso	1	1	7	3
(Japan) K Nishikori	6	6	5	6
(United States) M McDonald	6	7	6
27	(Belgium) D Goffin	2	5	3
21	(Russia) A Karatsev	7	1	6	6
(Spain) J Munar	5	6	3	2
(Australia) J Thompson	4	6	7	2	7^{7}
(Italy) G Mager	6	3	5	6	6^{3}
WC	(United States) J Brooksby	7	6	5	6
(Sweden) M Ymer	5	2	7	3
(United States) T Fritz	7^{7}	6	1	6
14	(Australia) A de Minaur	6^{4}	2	6	4

Second round
1	(Serbia) N Djokovic	6	6	6
(Netherlands) T Griekspoor	2	3	2
(Japan) K Nishikori	7^{7}	6	6^{5}	2	6
(United States) M McDonald	6^{3}	3	7^{7}	6	3
21	(Russia) A Karatsev	3	3	7	7^{11}	6
(Australia) J Thompson	6	6	5	6^{9}	1
WC	(United States) J Brooksby	6^{7}	7^{12}	7	6
(United States) T Fritz	7^{9}	6^{10}	5	2

Third round
1	(Serbia) N Djokovic	6^{4}	6	6	6
(Japan) K Nishikori	7^{7}	3	3	2
21	(Russia) A Karatsev	2	6	6	3	3
WC	(United States) J Brooksby	6	3	2	6	6

Fourth round
1	(Serbia) N Djokovic	1	6	6	6
WC	(United States) J Brooksby	6	3	2	2

==== Section 2 ====
First round
10	(Poland) H Hurkacz	6	6	6
(Belarus) E Gerasimov	3	4	3
(Italy) A Seppi	2	7	6	2	7^{15}
(Hungary) M Fucsovics	6	5	4	6	6^{13}
(United States) D Kudla	4	6	7	7^{7}
(Serbia) L Djere	6	3	5	6^{4}
Q	(Germany) O Otte	6^{8}	7	7^{7}	7^{7}
20	(Italy) L Sonego	7^{10}	5	6^{4}	6^{1}
28	(Italy) F Fognini	6	6	1	3	6^{4}
(Canada) V Pospisil	2	3	6	6	7^{7}
(United States) T Sandgren	6^{3}	3	4
(Belarus) I Ivashka	7^{7}	6	6
(France) C Moutet	6	7	7^{7}
(Italy) S Travaglia	4	5	6^{3}
(France) J Chardy	6^{5}	6^{7}	3
6	(Italy) M Berrettini	7^{7}	7^{9}	6

Second round
10	(Poland) H Hurkacz	6	4	4	6^{6}
(Italy) A Seppi	2	6	6	7^{8}
(United States) D Kudla	4	4	2
Q	(Germany) O Otte	6	6	6
(Canada) V Pospisil	3	4	6^{5}
(Belarus) I Ivashka	6	6	7^{7}
(France) C Moutet	6^{2}	6	4	3
6	(Italy) M Berrettini	7^{7}	4	6	6

Third round
(Italy) A Seppi	3	4	6	5
Q	(Germany) O Otte	6	6	2	7
(Belarus) I Ivashka	7^{7}	2	4	6	3
6	(Italy) M Berrettini	6^{5}	6	6	2	6

Fourth round
Q	(Germany) O Otte	4	6	3	2
6	(Italy) M Berrettini	6	3	6	6

==== Section 3 ====
First round
4	(Germany) A Zverev	6	7	6
(United States) S Querrey	4	5	2
(Spain) A Ramos Viñolas	6	5	5	7	6
(France) L Pouille	1	7	7	5	4
(Japan) Y Nishioka	7^{7}	2	4	2
WC	(United States) J Sock	6^{5}	6	6	6
(Germany) Y Hanfmann	0	6	2	1
31	(Kazakhstan) A Bublik	6	4	6	6
17	(France) G Monfils	6	6	6
(Argentina) F Coria	3	2	2
(United States) S Johnson	5	7^{10}	7^{10}	6
Q	(Germany) M Marterer	7	6^{8}	6^{8}	3
(Italy) M Cecchinato	6^{6}	7	4	4
WC	(United States) Z Svajda	7^{8}	5	6	6
WC	(Australia) M Purcell	4	2	6	2
13	(Italy) J Sinner	6	6	4	6

Second round
4	(Germany) A Zverev	6	6	6
(Spain) A Ramos Viñolas	1	0	3
WC	(United States) J Sock	7^{7}	6^{2}	6	4	6
31	(Kazakhstan) A Bublik	6^{3}	7^{7}	4	6	3
17	(France) G Monfils	7	4	6	6
(United States) S Johnson	5	6	4	4
WC	(United States) Z Svajda	3	6^{2}	7^{8}	4
13	(Italy) J Sinner	6	7^{7}	6^{6}	6

Third round
4	(Germany) A Zverev	3	6	6	2
WC	(United States) J Sock	6	2	3	1^{r}
17	(France) G Monfils	6^{1}	2	6	6	4
13	(Italy) J Sinner	7^{7}	6	4	4	6

Fourth round
4	(Germany) A Zverev	6	6	7^{9}
13	(Italy) J Sinner	4	4	6^{7}

==== Section 4 ====
First round
9	(Spain) P Carreño Busta	7	6	1	4	6^{7}
Q	(United States) M Cressy	5	4	6	6	7^{9}
(United States) S Korda	2	1^{r}
(Georgia (country)) N Basilashvili	6	2
(Italy) L Musetti	6^{5}	6	6	6
WC	(United States) E Nava	7^{7}	4	1	3
(South Korea) S-w Kwon	6^{3}	4	4
22	(United States) R Opelka	7^{7}	6	6
25	(Russia) K Khachanov	4	6	6	3	2
(South Africa) L Harris	6	1	4	6	6
(Uruguay) P Cuevas	1	3	1
WC	(United States) E Escobedo	6	6	6
(Spain) R Carballés Baena	7^{7}	6	1	6
(United States) T Paul	6^{5}	2	6	3
(Argentina) F Delbonis	2	2	3
7	(Canada) D Shapovalov	6	6	6

Second round
Q	(United States) M Cressy	6^{3}	3	5
(Georgia (country)) N Basilashvili	7^{7}	6	7
(Italy) L Musetti	6^{1}	5	4
22	(United States) R Opelka	7^{7}	7	6
(South Africa) L Harris	6	6	6
WC	(United States) E Escobedo	4	4	2
(Spain) R Carballés Baena	6^{7}	3	0
7	(Canada) D Shapovalov	7^{9}	6	6

Third round
(Georgia (country)) N Basilashvili	6^{5}	3	4
22	(United States) R Opelka	7^{7}	6	6
(South Africa) L Harris	6	6	6
7	(Canada) D Shapovalov	4	4	4

Fourth round
22	(United States) R Opelka	7^{8}	4	1	3
(South Africa) L Harris	6^{6}	6	6	6

=== Bottom half ===
==== Section 5 ====
First round
5	(Russia) A Rublev	6	7^{7}	6
Q	(Croatia) I Karlović	3	6^{3}	3
(Spain) P Martínez	4	4	7^{9}	6	6
(Australia) J Duckworth	6	6	6^{7}	2	2
(United States) F Tiafoe	7^{10}	5	6	6
Q	(United States) C Eubanks	6^{8}	7	3	4
(Argentina) G Pella	6^{2}	6	6	6
32	(Serbia) F Krajinović	7^{7}	3	2	2
18	(Spain) R Bautista Agut	6	6	6
(Australia) N Kyrgios	3	4	0
Q	(Poland) K Majchrzak	4	2	6	1
(Finland) E Ruusuvuori	6	6	3	6
(Spain) F López	7	6^{6}	6	3	3
LL	(Spain) B Zapata Miralles	5	7^{8}	4	6	6
Q	(Russia) E Donskoy	6^{0}	6	6^{1}	6^{8}
12	(Canada) F Auger-Aliassime	7^{7}	3	7^{7}	7^{10}

Second round
5	(Russia) A Rublev	7^{7}	6^{5}	6	6
(Spain) P Martínez	6^{2}	7^{7}	1	1
(United States) F Tiafoe	6	6	7
(Argentina) G Pella	1	2	5
18	(Spain) R Bautista Agut	6	6	6
(Finland) E Ruusuvuori	1	3	2
LL	(Spain) B Zapata Miralles	6^{5}	3	2
12	(Canada) F Auger-Aliassime	7^{7}	6	6

Third round
5	(Russia) A Rublev	6	3	6^{6}	6	1
(United States) F Tiafoe	4	6	7^{8}	4	6
18	(Spain) R Bautista Agut	3	4	6	6	3
12	(Canada) F Auger-Aliassime	6	6	4	3	6

Fourth round
(United States) F Tiafoe	6	2	6^{6}	4
12	(Canada) F Auger-Aliassime	4	6	7^{8}	6

==== Section 6 ====
First round
16	(Chile) C Garín	6	4	6	7^{7}
(Slovakia) N Gombos	3	6	4	6^{4}
Q	(Switzerland) H Laaksonen	7^{8}	7^{7}	6
(Australia) J Millman	6^{6}	6^{2}	1
(Serbia) D Lajović	6	7	2	6
(France) B Paire	3	5	6	4
Q	(Germany) P Gojowczyk	1	6	6	5	6
23	(France) U Humbert	6	1	2	7	4
26	(United Kingdom) C Norrie	4	4	3
(Spain) C Alcaraz	6	6	6
(Serbia) M Kecmanović	7^{12}	6	5	3	4
(France) A Rinderknech	6^{10}	3	7	6	6
(France) P-H Herbert	6	6	4	3	3
(France) A Mannarino	3	4	6	6	6
(United Kingdom) A Murray	6	6^{7}	6	3	4
3	(Greece) S Tsitsipas	2	7^{9}	3	6	6

Second round
16	(Chile) C Garín	6	6^{5}	2	4
Q	(Switzerland) H Laaksonen	3	7^{7}	6	6
(Serbia) D Lajović	6	4	6	5	4
Q	(Germany) P Gojowczyk	2	6	2	7	6
(Spain) C Alcaraz	7^{8}	4	6	6
(France) A Rinderknech	6^{6}	6	1	4
(France) A Mannarino	3	4	7^{7}	0
3	(Greece) S Tsitsipas	6	6	6^{4}	6

Third round
Q	(Switzerland) H Laaksonen	6	3	1	4
Q	(Germany) P Gojowczyk	3	6	6	6
(Spain) C Alcaraz	6	4	7^{7}	0	7^{7}
3	(Greece) S Tsitsipas	3	6	6^{2}	6	6^{5}

Fourth round
Q	(Germany) P Gojowczyk	7	1	7	2	0
(Spain) C Alcaraz	5	6	5	6	6

==== Section 7 ====
First round
8	(Norway) C Ruud	6	6	6
LL	(Japan) Y Sugita	3	2	2
Q	(Netherlands) B van de Zandschulp	2	3	6	7	6
(Spain) C Taberner	6	6	4	5	3
(Argentina) F Bagnis	6	6	6
(Japan) T Daniel	3	3	3
Q	(Argentina) M Trungelliti	5	6	7	6^{3}	6
29	(Spain) A Davidovich Fokina	7	3	5	7^{7}	4
19	(United States) J Isner	6^{7}	6^{6}	3
WC	(United States) B Nakashima	7^{9}	7^{8}	6
Q	(Slovakia) A Molčan	4	6	6	6
Q	(Turkey) C İlkel	6	3	1	1
(Czech Republic) J Veselý	6^{1}	6	6	6^{5}	6^{4}
(South Africa) K Anderson	7^{7}	4	3	7^{7}	7^{7}
(Lithuania) R Berankis	5	3	3
11	(Argentina) D Schwartzman	7	6	6

Second round
8	(Norway) C Ruud	6	4	3	4
Q	(Netherlands) B van de Zandschulp	3	6	6	6
(Argentina) F Bagnis	7^{7}	4	6	6
Q	(Argentina) M Trungelliti	6^{4}	6	3	3
WC	(United States) B Nakashima	3	6	6	2	4
Q	(Slovakia) A Molčan	6	3	1	6	6
(South Africa) K Anderson	6^{4}	3	4
11	(Argentina) D Schwartzman	7^{7}	6	6

Third round
Q	(Netherlands) B van de Zandschulp	3	6	6	6
(Argentina) F Bagnis	6	0	2	2
Q	(Slovakia) A Molčan	4	3	3
11	(Argentina) D Schwartzman	6	6	6

Fourth round
Q	(Netherlands) B van de Zandschulp	6	6	5	5	6
11	(Argentina) D Schwartzman	3	4	7	7	1

==== Section 8 ====
First round
15	(Bulgaria) G Dimitrov	6	7^{7}	6
WC	(United States) S Riffice	1	6^{3}	3
(Australia) A Popyrin	6	6^{3}	6	6
(Moldova) R Albot	3	7^{7}	3	3
(United States) M Giron	6	6	7
Q	(France) A Hoang	3	4	5
(Brazil) T Monteiro	3	7^{8}	4	1
24	(United Kingdom) D Evans	6	6^{6}	6	6
30	(Croatia) M Čilić	7^{7}	7^{7}	2	1	0^{r}
PR	(Germany) P Kohlschreiber	6^{4}	6^{3}	6	6	2
LL	(Kazakhstan) M Kukushkin	6	6	4	4	2
(Spain) P Andújar	3	4	6	6	6
(Germany) D Koepfer	6	3	4	6	6
Q	(France) Q Halys	4	6	6	3	4
(France) R Gasquet	4	3	1
2	(Russia) D Medvedev	6	6	6

Second round
15	(Bulgaria) G Dimitrov	6^{4}	6^{4}	0^{r}
(Australia) A Popyrin	7^{7}	7^{7}	4
(United States) M Giron	4	6^{3}	6	3
24	(United Kingdom) D Evans	6	7^{7}	2	6
PR	(Germany) P Kohlschreiber	4	3	1
(Spain) P Andújar	6	6	6
(Germany) D Koepfer	4	1	2
2	(Russia) D Medvedev	6	6	6

Third round
(Australia) A Popyrin	6	6	3	4	6^{1}
24	(United Kingdom) D Evans	4	3	6	6	7^{7}
(Spain) P Andújar	0	4	3
2	(Russia) D Medvedev	6	6	6

Fourth round
24	(United Kingdom) D Evans	3	4	3
2	(Russia) D Medvedev	6	6	6

== Seeded players ==
The following are the seeded players. Seedings are based on ATP rankings as of August 23, 2021. Rank and points before are as of August 30, 2021.

As a result of pandemic-related adjustments to the ranking system, players are defending the greater of their points from the 2019 and 2020 tournaments.

Seed	Rank	Player	Points before	Points defending from 2019 or 2020	Points won	Points after	Status
1	1	(Serbia) Novak Djokovic	11,113	180	1,200	12,133	Runner-up, lost to (Russia) Daniil Medvedev [2]
2	2	(Russia) Daniil Medvedev	9,980	1,200	2,000	10,780	Champion, defeated (Serbia) Novak Djokovic [1]
3	3	(Greece) Stefanos Tsitsipas	8,350	(150)^{†}	90	8,350^{^}	Third round lost to (Spain) Carlos Alcaraz
4	4	(Germany) Alexander Zverev	8,240	1,200	720	7,760	Semifinals lost to (Serbia) Novak Djokovic [1]
5	7	(Russia) Andrey Rublev	6,400	360	90	6,130	Third round lost to (United States) Frances Tiafoe
6	8	(Italy) Matteo Berrettini	5,533	720	360	5,173	Quarterfinals lost to (Serbia) Novak Djokovic [1]
7	10	(Canada) Denis Shapovalov	3,580	360	90	3,310	Third round lost to (South Africa) Lloyd Harris
8	11	(Norway) Casper Ruud	3,455	90	45	3,440^{^}	Second round lost to (Netherlands) Botic van de Zandschulp [Q]
9	12	(Spain) Pablo Carreño Busta	3,325	720	10	2,650^{^}	First round lost to (United States) Maxime Cressy [Q]
10	13	(Poland) Hubert Hurkacz	3,128	45	45	3,128	Second round lost to (Italy) Andreas Seppi
11	14	(Argentina) Diego Schwartzman	2,980	360	180	2,800	Fourth round lost to (Netherlands) Botic van de Zandschulp [Q]
12	15	(Canada) Félix Auger-Aliassime	2,828	180	720	3,368	Semifinals lost to (Russia) Daniil Medvedev [2]
13	16	(Italy) Jannik Sinner	2,750	35	180	2,895	Fourth round lost to (Germany) Alexander Zverev [4]
14	17	(Australia) Alex de Minaur	2,555	360	10	2,218^{^}	First round lost to (United States) Taylor Fritz
15	18	(Bulgaria) Grigor Dimitrov	2,511	720	45	1,836	Second round retired against (Australia) Alexei Popyrin
16	19	(Chile) Cristian Garín	2,510	45	45	2,510	Second round lost to (Switzerland) Henri Laaksonen [Q]
17	20	(France) Gaël Monfils	2,503	360	90	2,233	Third round lost to (Italy) Jannik Sinner [13]
18	21	(Spain) Roberto Bautista Agut	2,405	90	90	2,405	Third round lost to (Canada) Félix Auger-Aliassime [12]
19	22	(United States) John Isner	2,238	90	10	2,171^{^}	First round lost to (United States) Brandon Nakashima [WC]
20	23	(Italy) Lorenzo Sonego	2,227	45+125^{‡}	10+20	2,097^{^}	First round lost to (Germany) Oscar Otte [Q]
21	25	(Russia) Aslan Karatsev	2,109	(125)^{§}	90	2,074	Third round lost to (United States) Jenson Brooksby [WC]
22	24	(United States) Reilly Opelka	2,206	45	180	2,341	Fourth round lost to (South Africa) Lloyd Harris
23	26	(France) Ugo Humbert	2,090	45+90^{‡}	10+45	2,045^{^}	First round lost to (Germany) Peter Gojowczyk [Q]
24	27	(United Kingdom) Daniel Evans	2,074	90	180	2,164	Fourth round lost to (Russia) Daniil Medvedev [2]
25	28	(Russia) Karen Khachanov	2,010	90	10	1,965^{^}	First round lost to (South Africa) Lloyd Harris
26	29	(United Kingdom) Cameron Norrie	1,975	90	10	1,930^{^}	First round lost to (Spain) Carlos Alcaraz
27	30	(Belgium) David Goffin	1,933	180	10	1,766^{^}	First round lost to (United States) Mackenzie McDonald
28	31	(Italy) Fabio Fognini	1,734	10	10	1,744^{^}	First round lost to (Canada) Vasek Pospisil
29	32	(Spain) Alejandro Davidovich Fokina	1,723	180+194^{‡}	10+60	1,429^{^}	First round lost to (Argentina) Marco Trungelliti [Q]
30	36	(Croatia) Marin Čilić	1,650	180	10	1,493^{^}	First round retired against (Germany) Philipp Kohlschreiber [PR]
31	37	(Kazakhstan) Alexander Bublik	1,633	90	45	1,588	Second round lost to (United States) Jack Sock [WC]
32	38	(Serbia) Filip Krajinović	1,589	90	10	1,544^{^}	First round lost to (Argentina) Guido Pella

† Because the 2020 tournament was non-mandatory, the player was defending 150 points from his 19th best result instead of 90 points from the 2020 US Open.
‡ The player was also defending points from one or more 2019 ATP Challenger Tour tournaments. Those points were frozen in 2020 as a result of pandemic-related adjustments to the ranking system.
§ The player did not qualify for the tournament in 2019 or 2020 and is defending points from a 2020 ATP Challenger Tour tournament (Ostrava) instead.
^ Because the 2021 tournament was non-mandatory, the player substituted his 19th best result in place of the points won in this tournament.

=== Withdrawn players ===
The following players would have been seeded, but withdrew before the tournament began.

Rank	Player	Points before	Points defending from 2019 or 2020	Points after	Withdrawal reason
5	(Spain) Rafael Nadal	7,815	2,000	5,815	Left foot Injury
6	(Austria) Dominic Thiem	6,995	2,000	4,995	Right wrist injury
9	(Switzerland) Roger Federer	4,125	360	3,765	Right knee surgery
33	(Switzerland) Stan Wawrinka	1,715	360	1,355	Left foot injury
34	(Canada) Milos Raonic	1,694	45	1,649	Right leg injury
35	(Croatia) Borna Ćorić	1,674	360	1,319^{^}	Right shoulder injury

^ Because the 2021 tournament was non-mandatory, the player substituted his 19th best result in place of zero points for this tournament.

== Other entry information ==
=== Wild card entries ===
- (United States) Jenson Brooksby
- (United States) Ernesto Escobedo
- (United States) Brandon Nakashima
- (United States) Emilio Nava
- (Australia) Max Purcell
- (United States) Sam Riffice
- (United States) Jack Sock
- (United States) Zachary Svajda

=== Qualifiers ===
- (United States) Maxime Cressy
- (Russia) Evgeny Donskoy
- (United States) Christopher Eubanks
- (Germany) Peter Gojowczyk
- (France) Quentin Halys
- (France) Antoine Hoang
- (Turkey) Cem İlkel
- (Croatia) Ivo Karlović
- (Switzerland) Henri Laaksonen
- (Poland) Kamil Majchrzak
- (Germany) Maximilian Marterer
- (Slovakia) Alex Molčan
- (Germany) Oscar Otte
- (Denmark) Holger Rune
- (Argentina) Marco Trungelliti
- (Netherlands) Botic van de Zandschulp

=== Lucky losers ===
- (Kazakhstan) Mikhail Kukushkin
- (Japan) Yūichi Sugita
- (Spain) Bernabé Zapata Miralles

=== Protected ranking ===
- (Germany) Philipp Kohlschreiber (96)

=== Withdrawals ===
- ‡ (Switzerland) Stan Wawrinka (29) → replaced by (United Kingdom) Andy Murray (104)
- ‡ (Switzerland) Roger Federer (9) → replaced by (Netherlands) Tallon Griekspoor (105)
- ‡ (Croatia) Borna Ćorić (33) → replaced by (United States) Mackenzie McDonald (106)
- ‡ (United Kingdom) Kyle Edmund (85) → replaced by (United States) Denis Kudla (107)
- ‡ (Austria) Dominic Thiem (6) → replaced by (Spain) Carlos Taberner (108)
- ‡ (Spain) Rafael Nadal (3) → replaced by (Italy) Salvatore Caruso (109)
- ‡ (Slovenia) Aljaž Bedene (58) → replaced by (Japan) Taro Daniel (110) (Note: Last direct acceptance)
- @ (Canada) Milos Raonic (22) → replaced by (Spain) Bernabé Zapata Miralles (LL)
- § (France) Jo-Wilfried Tsonga (93) → replaced by (Japan) Yūichi Sugita (LL)
- § (France) Gilles Simon (102) → replaced by (Kazakhstan) Mikhail Kukushkin (LL)

‡ – withdrew from entry list before qualifying began
@ – withdrew from entry list after qualifying began
§ – withdrew from main draw

== See also ==
- 2021 US Open – Day-by-day summaries

== Explanatory notes ==
Preceded by 2021 Wimbledon Championships – Men's singles	Grand Slam men's singles	Succeeded by 2022 Australian Open – Men's singles
