= 2024 Australian Open – Men's singles =

Tennis championship

Men's singles
- 2024 Australian Open

Final
- Champion: (Italy) Jannik Sinner
- Runner-up: Daniil Medvedev
- Score: 3–6, 3–6, 6–4, 6–4, 6–3

Details
- Draw: 128
- Seeds: 32

Events
Singles	men	women		boys	girls
Doubles	men	women	mixed	boys	girls
WC Singles	men	women	quad	boys	girls
WC Doubles	men	women	quad	boys	girls

Qualification
Singles	men	women
- Australian Open

Jannik Sinner defeated Daniil Medvedev in the final, 3–6, 3–6, 6–4, 6–4, 6–3 to win the men's singles tennis title at the 2024 Australian Open. It was his first major singles title. Sinner was the second Italian man in the Open Era to win a singles major, after Adriano Panatta at the 1976 French Open. He was the first new Australian Open men's singles champion since Stan Wawrinka in 2014.

Novak Djokovic was the defending champion, but lost in the semifinals to Sinner. His loss ended a 33-match winning streak at the Australian Open, marked his first-ever defeat in an Australian Open semifinal after going undefeated in his first ten, and first defeat in any major semifinal since the 2019 French Open, ending a streak of twelve consecutive semifinal victories. Djokovic retained the world No. 1 singles ranking after Carlos Alcaraz lost in the quarterfinals; Medvedev was also in contention for the top spot.

Medvedev lost the final after winning the first two sets (as he did in 2022), making him the only player in the Open Era to lose two major finals after having a two-set lead, and the second to lose all of his first three Australian Open finals (after Andy Murray). Medvedev also set Open Era records for the most time spent playing at one edition of a singles major, at 24 hours and 17 minutes (an average of 3 hours 27 minutes per match), and for the most sets played in a singles major, at 31 (averaging 4.4 sets per match).

A record number of seeded players (30 of 32 seeds) advanced to the second round, for the first time since the introduction of the 32-seed system at the 2001 Wimbledon Championships. The tournament featured a record-equaling 35 five-set matches, tying the Open Era record set at the 1983 US Open (surpassed soon after by the 2024 Wimbledon Championships).

This marked the final Australian Open appearances for five-time finalist, three-time major champion, two-time Olympic gold medalist, and former world No. 1 Murray, and 2020 finalist, 2020 US Open champion, and former world No. 3 Dominic Thiem; both players lost in the first round, to Tomás Martín Etcheverry and Félix Auger-Aliassime, respectively. It was also the final major appearance for former world No. 3 and 2016 Wimbledon finalist Milos Raonic, who lost to Alex de Minaur in the first round. Raonic later announced his retirement from professional tennis in 2026.

== Seeds ==
1. (Serbia) Novak Djokovic (semifinals)
2. (Spain) Carlos Alcaraz (quarterfinals)
3. Daniil Medvedev (final)
4. (Italy) Jannik Sinner (champion)
5. Andrey Rublev (quarterfinals)
6. (Germany) Alexander Zverev (semifinals)
7. (Greece) Stefanos Tsitsipas (fourth round)
8. (Denmark) Holger Rune (second round)
9. (Poland) Hubert Hurkacz (quarterfinals)
10. (Australia) Alex de Minaur (fourth round)
11. (Norway) Casper Ruud (third round)
12. (United States) Taylor Fritz (quarterfinals)
13. (Bulgaria) Grigor Dimitrov (third round)
14. (United States) Tommy Paul (third round)
15. Karen Khachanov (fourth round)
16. (United States) Ben Shelton (third round)
17. (United States) Frances Tiafoe (second round)
18. (Chile) Nicolás Jarry (first round)
19. (United Kingdom) Cameron Norrie (fourth round)
20. (France) Adrian Mannarino (fourth round)
21. (France) Ugo Humbert (third round)
22. (Argentina) Francisco Cerúndolo (second round)
23. (Spain) Alejandro Davidovich Fokina (second round)
24. (Germany) Jan-Lennard Struff (second round)
25. (Italy) Lorenzo Musetti (second round)
26. (Argentina) Sebastián Báez (third round)
27. (Canada) Félix Auger-Aliassime (third round)
28. (Netherlands) Tallon Griekspoor (third round)
29. (United States) Sebastian Korda (third round)
30. (Argentina) Tomás Martín Etcheverry (third round)
31. (Kazakhstan) Alexander Bublik (first round)
32. (Czech Republic) Jiří Lehečka (second round)

Click on the seed number of a player to go to their draw section.

== Draw ==
Key

- Q = Qualifier
- WC = Wild card
- LL = Lucky loser
- Alt = Alternate
- ITF = ITF entry
- PR = Protected ranking
- SR = Special ranking
- SE = Special exempt
- JE = Junior exempt
- JR = Junior Accelerator Programme entrant
- CO = College Accelerator Programme entrant
- NG = Next Gen Accelerator Program entrant
- w/o = Walkover
- r = Retired
- d = Defaulted

=== Finals ===
Quarterfinals
1	(Serbia) Novak Djokovic	7^{7}	4	6	6
12	(United States) Taylor Fritz	6^{3}	6	2	3
4	(Italy) Jannik Sinner	6	7^{7}	6
5	Andrey Rublev	4	6^{5}	3
9	(Poland) Hubert Hurkacz	6^{4}	6	3	7	4
3	Daniil Medvedev	7^{7}	2	6	5	6
6	(Germany) Alexander Zverev	6	6	6^{2}	6
2	(Spain) Carlos Alcaraz	1	3	7^{7}	4

Semifinals
1	(Serbia) Novak Djokovic	1	2	7^{8}	3
4	(Italy) Jannik Sinner	6	6	6^{6}	6
3	Daniil Medvedev	5	3	7^{7}	7^{7}	6
6	(Germany) Alexander Zverev	7	6	6^{4}	6^{5}	3

Final
4	(Italy) Jannik Sinner	3	3	6	6	6
3	Daniil Medvedev	6	6	4	4	3

=== Top half ===
==== Section 1 ====
First round
1	(Serbia) N Djokovic	6	6^{5}	6	6
Q	(Croatia) D Prižmić	2	7^{7}	3	4
(Australia) A Popyrin	6	7^{7}	6
WC	(Australia) M Polmans	3	6^{3}	2
(Germany) Y Hanfmann	4	3	5
(France) G Monfils	6	6	7
(United Kingdom) A Murray	4	2	2
30	(Argentina) TM Etcheverry	6	6	6
20	(France) A Mannarino	6	3	5	6	6
(Switzerland) S Wawrinka	4	6	7	3	0
A Shevchenko	3	3	1
(Spain) J Munar	6	6	6
(Australia) C O'Connell	3	7	4	6	7
(Chile) C Garín	6	5	6	1	5
(Spain) R Bautista Agut	2	6^{2}	5
16	(United States) B Shelton	6	7^{7}	7

Second round
1	(Serbia) N Djokovic	6	4	7^{7}	6
(Australia) A Popyrin	3	6	6^{4}	3
(France) G Monfils	4	4	4
30	(Argentina) TM Etcheverry	6	6	6
20	(France) A Mannarino	6	6	1	2	6
(Spain) J Munar	3	3	6	6	3
(Australia) C O'Connell	4	1	6	6^{5}
16	(United States) B Shelton	6	6	3	7^{7}

Third round
1	(Serbia) N Djokovic	6	6	7^{7}
30	(Argentina) TM Etcheverry	3	3	6^{2}
20	(France) A Mannarino	7^{7}	1	6^{2}	6	6
16	(United States) B Shelton	6^{4}	6	7^{7}	3	4

Fourth round
1	(Serbia) N Djokovic	6	6	6
20	(France) A Mannarino	0	0	3

==== Section 2 ====
First round
12	(United States) T Fritz	4	6	3	6	6
(Argentina) F Díaz Acosta	6	3	6	2	4
(Spain) R Carballés Baena	3	2	6	4
LL	(France) H Gaston	6	6	3	6
(Hungary) F Marozsán	6	2	6	7
PR	(Croatia) M Čilić	1	6	2	5
Q	(Australia) D Sweeny	6	3	4	6	2
22	(Argentina) F Cerúndolo	3	6	6	2	6
25	(Italy) L Musetti	7^{7}	7^{7}	4	6
(France) B Bonzi	6^{3}	6^{4}	6	2
WC	(Australia) J Duckworth	7^{7}	3	6	3	3
(France) L Van Assche	6^{2}	6	3	6	6
(Australia) A Vukic	6	6^{3}	2	6	4
(Australia) J Thompson	3	7^{7}	6	3	6
LL	(Belgium) Z Bergs	7	1	1	3
7	(Greece) S Tsitsipas	5	6	6	6

Second round
12	(United States) T Fritz	6	6	6
LL	(France) H Gaston	0	3	1
(Hungary) F Marozsán	7^{7}	6	6
22	(Argentina) F Cerúndolo	6^{5}	4	2
25	(Italy) L Musetti	3	6	7^{7}	3	0
(France) L Van Assche	6	3	6^{5}	6	6
(Australia) J Thompson	6	6^{6}	2	6^{4}
7	(Greece) S Tsitsipas	4	7^{8}	6	7^{7}

Third round
12	(United States) T Fritz	3	6	6	6
(Hungary) F Marozsán	6	4	2	2
(France) L Van Assche	3	0	4
7	(Greece) S Tsitsipas	6	6	6

Fourth round
12	(United States) T Fritz	7^{7}	5	6	6
7	(Greece) S Tsitsipas	6^{3}	7	3	3

==== Section 3 ====
First round
4	(Italy) J Sinner	6	7	6
(Netherlands) B van de Zandschulp	4	5	3
Q	(Netherlands) J de Jong	4	6	6	6
(Argentina) P Cachin	6	2	3	4
(Colombia) DE Galán	2	6	7^{7}	4	7^{10}
WC	(Australia) J Kubler	6	3	6^{3}	6	6^{8}
(United States) JJ Wolf	6	2	3	0^{r}
26	(Argentina) S Báez	3	6	6	3
17	(United States) F Tiafoe	6	7^{9}	2	6
(Croatia) B Ćorić	3	6^{7}	6	3
(Czech Republic) T Macháč	7	6	7
LL	(Japan) S Mochizuki	5	1	5
(Chile) A Tabilo	7^{7}	6^{7}	6	1	3
Q	(United States) A Kovacevic	6^{2}	7^{9}	1	6	6
(Germany) D Altmaier	7	3	6^{5}	6^{3}
15	K Khachanov	5	6	7^{7}	7^{7}

Second round
4	(Italy) J Sinner	6	6	6
Q	(Netherlands) J de Jong	2	2	2
(Colombia) DE Galán	5	6	2	4
26	(Argentina) S Báez	7	2	6	6
17	(United States) F Tiafoe	4	4	6^{5}
(Czech Republic) T Macháč	6	6	7^{7}
Q	(United States) A Kovacevic	4	3	6	3
15	K Khachanov	6	6	4	6

Third round
4	(Italy) J Sinner	6	6	6
26	(Argentina) S Báez	0	1	3
(Czech Republic) T Macháč	4	6^{4}	6	6^{5}
15	K Khachanov	6	7^{7}	4	7^{7}

Fourth round
4	(Italy) J Sinner	6	7	6
15	K Khachanov	4	5	3

==== Section 4 ====
First round
10	(Australia) A de Minaur	6^{6}	6	2
PR	(Canada) M Raonic	7^{8}	3	0^{r}
(Italy) M Arnaldi	7^{7}	6	6
WC	(Australia) A Walton	6^{5}	2	4
P Kotov	7	6	6^{6}	6^{5}	6
(France) A Rinderknech	5	1	7^{8}	7^{7}	3
Q	(Italy) F Cobolli	6	3	6	2	7
18	(Chile) N Jarry	4	6	3	6	5
29	(United States) S Korda	6	6	2	4	6
Q	(Czech Republic) V Kopřiva	1	4	6	6	2
(France) Q Halys	4	7^{7}	7	7^{7}
Q	(South Africa) L Harris	6	6^{5}	5	6^{2}
(United States) C Eubanks	6	6	6
(Japan) T Daniel	4	2	3
(Brazil) T Seyboth Wild	5	4	6	6	6^{6}
5	A Rublev	7	6	3	4	7^{10}

Second round
10	(Australia) A de Minaur	6	6	6
(Italy) M Arnaldi	3	0	3
P Kotov	5	3	7	2
Q	(Italy) F Cobolli	7	6	5	6
29	(United States) S Korda	6	6	6
(France) Q Halys	4	4	4
(United States) C Eubanks	4	4	4
5	A Rublev	6	6	6

Third round
10	(Australia) A de Minaur	6	6	6
Q	(Italy) F Cobolli	3	3	1
29	(United States) S Korda	2	6^{6}	4
5	A Rublev	6	7^{8}	6

Fourth round
10	(Australia) A de Minaur	4	7^{7}	7^{7}	3	0
5	A Rublev	6	6^{5}	6^{4}	6	6

=== Bottom half ===
==== Section 5 ====
First round
8	(Denmark) H Rune	6	4	7^{7}	6
(Japan) Y Nishioka	2	6	6^{3}	4
(Serbia) L Djere	2	7^{7}	2	6	2
WC	(France) A Cazaux	6	6^{3}	6	3	6
(France) A Fils	4	7	6	6
PR	(Czech Republic) J Veselý	6	5	2	3
R Safiullin	6	6	6^{3}	4	5
28	(Netherlands) T Griekspoor	2	3	7^{7}	6	7
21	(France) U Humbert	6	7	5	6
Q	(Belgium) D Goffin	2	5	7	3
(China) Z Zhang	6	7^{7}	7^{7}
(Argentina) F Coria	4	6^{3}	6^{5}
PR	(Canada) D Shapovalov	3	5	5
Q	(Czech Republic) J Menšík	6	7	7
Q	(Australia) O Jasika	6^{4}	4	2
9	(Poland) H Hurkacz	7^{7}	6	6

Second round
8	(Denmark) H Rune	6^{4}	4	6	3
WC	(France) A Cazaux	7^{7}	6	4	6
(France) A Fils	6	1	5	4
28	(Netherlands) T Griekspoor	3	6	7	6
21	(France) U Humbert	6	5	6	7^{7}
(China) Z Zhang	2	7	1	6^{3}
Q	(Czech Republic) J Menšík	7^{11}	1	7	1	3
9	(Poland) H Hurkacz	6^{9}	6	5	6	6

Third round
WC	(France) A Cazaux	6	6	6
28	(Netherlands) T Griekspoor	3	3	1
21	(France) U Humbert	6	1	6^{4}	3
9	(Poland) H Hurkacz	3	6	7^{7}	6

Fourth round
WC	(France) A Cazaux	6^{6}	6^{3}	4
9	(Poland) H Hurkacz	7^{8}	7^{7}	6

==== Section 6 ====
First round
13	(Bulgaria) G Dimitrov	4	6	7^{7}	6
(Hungary) M Fucsovics	6	3	6^{1}	2
(Austria) S Ofner	6^{1}	6	7^{7}	1	6^{8}
(Australia) T Kokkinakis	7^{7}	2	6^{4}	6	7^{10}
(Germany) M Marterer	5	6^{3}	2
(Portugal) N Borges	7	7^{7}	6
(France) C Lestienne	4	4	6^{5}
23	(Spain) A Davidovich Fokina	6	6	7^{7}
27	(Canada) F Auger-Aliassime	6	7	6^{5}	5	6
(Austria) D Thiem	3	5	7^{7}	7	3
(France) A Müller	6	6^{3}	6	4	6^{7}
Q	(France) H Grenier	2	7^{7}	4	6	7^{10}
WC	(United States) P Kypson	6	3	4	6^{4}
(Finland) E Ruusuvuori	4	6	6	7^{7}
Q	(France) T Atmane	7	2	4	0^{r}
3	D Medvedev	5	6	6	1

Second round
13	(Bulgaria) G Dimitrov	6	6	4	6
(Australia) T Kokkinakis	3	2	6	4
(Portugal) N Borges	7^{9}	6	6
23	(Spain) A Davidovich Fokina	6^{7}	3	3
27	(Canada) F Auger-Aliassime	6	3	6	6
Q	(France) H Grenier	1	6	1	2
(Finland) E Ruusuvuori	6	7^{7}	4	6^{1}	0
3	D Medvedev	3	6^{1}	6	7^{7}	6

Third round
13	(Bulgaria) G Dimitrov	7^{7}	4	2	6^{6}
(Portugal) N Borges	6^{3}	6	6	7^{8}
27	(Canada) F Auger-Aliassime	3	4	3
3	D Medvedev	6	6	6

Fourth round
(Portugal) N Borges	3	6^{4}	7	1
3	D Medvedev	6	7^{7}	5	6

==== Section 7 ====
First round
6	(Germany) A Zverev	4	6	7^{7}	6
(Germany) D Koepfer	6	3	6^{3}	3
PR	(South Korea) S-w Kwon	6^{0}	6	6^{3}	3
Q	(Slovakia) L Klein	7^{7}	4	7^{7}	6
WC	(Australia) J McCabe	6^{5}	6	1	3
(United States) A Michelsen	7^{7}	3	6	6
(Spain) B Zapata Miralles	3	2	3
32	(Czech Republic) J Lehečka	6	6	6
19	(United Kingdom) C Norrie	6	6	6
(Peru) JP Varillas	4	4	2
(Serbia) D Lajović	3	6	3	6^{3}
Q	(Italy) G Zeppieri	6	3	6	7^{7}
(Australia) M Purcell	3	7^{7}	6	7
Q	(Hungary) M Valkusz	6	6^{2}	4	5
(Spain) A Ramos Viñolas	1	3	1
11	(Norway) C Ruud	6	6	6

Second round
6	(Germany) A Zverev	7	3	4	7^{7}	7^{10}
Q	(Slovakia) L Klein	5	6	6	6^{5}	6^{7}
(United States) A Michelsen	4	6	6	6
32	(Czech Republic) J Lehečka	6	3	4	4
19	(United Kingdom) C Norrie	3	6^{4}	6	6	6
Q	(Italy) G Zeppieri	6	7^{7}	2	4	4
(Australia) M Purcell	3	7^{7}	3	6	6^{7}
11	(Norway) C Ruud	6	6^{5}	6	3	7^{10}

Third round
6	(Germany) A Zverev	6	7^{7}	6
(United States) A Michelsen	2	6^{4}	2
19	(United Kingdom) C Norrie	6	6^{7}	6	6
11	(Norway) C Ruud	4	7^{9}	4	3

Fourth round
6	(Germany) A Zverev	7	3	6	4	7^{10}
19	(United Kingdom) C Norrie	5	6	3	6	6^{3}

==== Section 8 ====
First round
14	(United States) T Paul	6	6	6
(France) G Barrère	2	3	3
(United States) M Giron	4	6	6	0	2
(United Kingdom) J Draper	6	3	4	6	6
(Serbia) M Kecmanović	4	7	6	6
(Japan) Y Watanuki	6	5	3	4
(Australia) R Hijikata	6	3	2	7^{7}	6^{8}
24	(Germany) J-L Struff	3	6	6	6^{2}	7^{10}
31	(Kazakhstan) A Bublik	4	2	6^{5}
Q	(India) S Nagal	6	6	7^{7}
(United States) M McDonald	3	6	6	4	2
WC	(China) J Shang	6	1	3	6	6
(United Kingdom) D Evans	6	6^{8}	2	6^{4}
(Italy) L Sonego	4	7^{10}	6	7^{7}
(France) R Gasquet	6^{5}	1	2
2	(Spain) C Alcaraz	7^{7}	6	6

Second round
14	(United States) T Paul	6	3	6	7
(United Kingdom) J Draper	2	6	3	5
(Serbia) M Kecmanović	6	1	7^{7}	1	7^{11}
24	(Germany) J-L Struff	4	6	6^{5}	6	6^{9}
Q	(India) S Nagal	6	3	5	4
WC	(China) J Shang	2	6	7	6
(Italy) L Sonego	4	7^{7}	3	6^{3}
2	(Spain) C Alcaraz	6	6^{3}	6	7^{7}

Third round
14	(United States) T Paul	4	6	6	6^{7}	0
(Serbia) M Kecmanović	6	3	2	7^{9}	6
WC	(China) J Shang	1	1	0^{r}
2	(Spain) C Alcaraz	6	6	1

Fourth round
(Serbia) M Kecmanović	4	4	0
2	(Spain) C Alcaraz	6	6	6

== Seeded players ==
The following are the seeded players. Seedings are based on ATP rankings as of 8 January 2024. Rankings and points before are as of 15 January 2024.

Seed	Rank	Player	Points before	Points defending	Points won	Points after	Status
1	1	(Serbia) Novak Djokovic	11,055	2,000	800	9,855	Semifinals lost to (Italy) Jannik Sinner [4]
2	2	(Spain) Carlos Alcaraz	8,855	0	400	9,255	Quarterfinals lost to (Germany) Alexander Zverev [6]
3	3	Daniil Medvedev	7,555	90	1,300	8,765	Runner-up, lost to (Italy) Jannik Sinner [4]
4	4	(Italy) Jannik Sinner	6,490	180	2,000	8,310	Champion, defeated Daniil Medvedev [3]
5	5	Andrey Rublev	5,010	360	400	5,050	Quarterfinals lost to (Italy) Jannik Sinner [4]
6	6	(Germany) Alexander Zverev	4,275	45	800	5,030	Semifinals lost to Daniil Medvedev [3]
7	7	(Greece) Stefanos Tsitsipas	4,025	1,200	200	3,025	Fourth round lost to (United States) Taylor Fritz [12]
8	8	(Denmark) Holger Rune	3,815	180	50	3,685	Second round lost to (France) Arthur Cazaux [WC]
9	9	(Poland) Hubert Hurkacz	3,320	180	400	3,540	Quarterfinals lost to Daniil Medvedev [3]
10	10	(Australia) Alex de Minaur	2,950	180	200	2,970	Fourth round lost to Andrey Rublev [5]
11	11	(Norway) Casper Ruud	2,910	45	100	2,965	Third round lost to (United Kingdom) Cameron Norrie [19]
12	12	(United States) Taylor Fritz	2,840	45	400	3,195	Quarterfinals lost to (Serbia) Novak Djokovic [1]
13	13	(Bulgaria) Grigor Dimitrov	2,775	90	100	2,785	Third round lost to (Portugal) Nuno Borges
14	14	(United States) Tommy Paul	2,670	720	100	2,050	Third round lost to (Serbia) Miomir Kecmanović
15	15	Karen Khachanov	2,430	720	200	1,910	Fourth round lost to (Italy) Jannik Sinner [4]
16	16	(United States) Ben Shelton	2,225	360	100	1,965	Third round lost to (France) Adrian Mannarino [20]
17	17	(United States) Frances Tiafoe	2,100	90	50	2,060	Second round lost to (Czech Republic) Tomáš Macháč
18	18	(Chile) Nicolás Jarry	1,870	70	10	1,810	First round lost to (Italy) Flavio Cobolli [Q]
19	22	(United Kingdom) Cameron Norrie	1,710	90	200	1,820	Fourth round lost to (Germany) Alexander Zverev [6]
20	19	(France) Adrian Mannarino	1,765	45	200	1,920	Fourth round lost to (Serbia) Novak Djokovic [1]
21	20	(France) Ugo Humbert	1,765	90	100	1,775	Third round lost to (Poland) Hubert Hurkacz [9]
22	21	(Argentina) Francisco Cerúndolo	1,760	90	50	1,720	Second round lost to (Hungary) Fábián Marozsán
23	24	(Spain) Alejandro Davidovich Fokina	1,530	45	50	1,535	Second round lost to (Portugal) Nuno Borges
24	25	(Germany) Jan-Lennard Struff	1,511	35	50	1,526	Second round lost to (Serbia) Miomir Kecmanović
25	28	(Italy) Lorenzo Musetti	1,440	10	50	1,480	Second round lost to (France) Luca Van Assche
26	29	(Argentina) Sebastián Báez	1,435	10	100	1,525	Third round lost to (Italy) Jannik Sinner [4]
27	30	(Canada) Félix Auger-Aliassime	1,425	180	100	1,345	Third round lost to Daniil Medvedev [3]
28	31	(Netherlands) Tallon Griekspoor	1,410	90	100	1,420	Third round lost to (France) Arthur Cazaux [WC]
29	26	(United States) Sebastian Korda	1,480	360	100	1,220	Third round lost to Andrey Rublev [5]
30	32	(Argentina) Tomás Martín Etcheverry	1,375	45	100	1,430	Third round lost to (Serbia) Novak Djokovic [1]
31	27	(Kazakhstan) Alexander Bublik	1,459	10	10	1,459	First round lost to (India) Sumit Nagal [Q]
32	23	(Czech Republic) Jiří Lehečka	1,555	360	50	1,245	Second round lost to (United States) Alex Michelsen

== Other entry information ==
=== Wildcards ===
- (France) Arthur Cazaux
- (Australia) James Duckworth
- (Australia) Jason Kubler
- (United States) Patrick Kypson
- (Australia) James McCabe
- (Australia) Marc Polmans
- (China) Shang Juncheng
- (Australia) Adam Walton

=== Protected ranking ===
- (Croatia) Marin Čilić (21)
- (Canada) Denis Shapovalov (27)
- (Canada) Milos Raonic (33)
- (South Korea) Kwon Soon-woo (80)
- (Czech Republic) Jiří Veselý (94)

=== Qualifiers ===
- (France) Térence Atmane
- (Italy) Flavio Cobolli
- (Netherlands) Jesper de Jong
- (Belgium) David Goffin
- (France) Hugo Grenier
- (South Africa) Lloyd Harris
- (Australia) Omar Jasika
- (Slovakia) Lukáš Klein
- (Czech Republic) Vít Kopřiva
- (United States) Aleksandar Kovacevic
- (Czech Republic) Jakub Menšík
- (India) Sumit Nagal
- (Croatia) Dino Prižmić
- (Australia) Dane Sweeny
- (Hungary) Máté Valkusz
- (Italy) Giulio Zeppieri

=== Lucky losers ===
- (Belgium) Zizou Bergs
- (France) Hugo Gaston
- (Japan) Shintaro Mochizuki

=== Withdrawals ===
The entry list was released by Tennis Australia based on the ATP rankings for the week of 4 December 2023.

- ‡ (United States) Reilly Opelka (33 PR) → replaced by (Austria) Dominic Thiem (98)
- ‡ (Switzerland) Dominic Stricker (94) → replaced by (Japan) Yosuke Watanuki (99)
- ‡ (Spain) Rafael Nadal (9 PR) → replaced by (France) Quentin Halys (100)
- @ Aslan Karatsev (38) → replaced by (Japan) Shintaro Mochizuki (LL)
- § (Croatia) Borna Gojo (72) → replaced by (France) Hugo Gaston (LL)
- § (Italy) Matteo Berrettini (92) → replaced by (Belgium) Zizou Bergs (LL)

‡ – withdrew from entry list before qualifying began
@ – withdrew from entry list after qualifying began
§ – withdrew from main draw

Preceded by 2023 US Open – Men's singles	Grand Slam men's singles	Succeeded by 2024 French Open – Men's singles
