= 2024 Australian Open =

Tennis championships

- Date: 14–28 January 2024
- Edition: 112th Open Era (56th)
- Category: Grand Slam
- Draw: 128S / 64D
- Prize money: A$86,500,000
- Surface: Hard (GreenSet)
- Location: Melbourne, Victoria, Australia
- Venue: Melbourne Park
- Attendance: 1,110,657

Champions

Men's singles
- (Italy) Jannik Sinner

Women's singles
- Aryna Sabalenka

Men's doubles
- (India) Rohan Bopanna / (Australia) Matthew Ebden

Women's doubles
- (Chinese Taipei) Hsieh Su-wei / (Belgium) Elise Mertens

Mixed doubles
- (Chinese Taipei) Hsieh Su-wei / (Poland) Jan Zieliński

Wheelchair men's singles
- (Japan) Tokito Oda

Wheelchair women's singles
- (Netherlands) Diede de Groot

Wheelchair quad singles
- (Netherlands) Sam Schröder

Wheelchair men's doubles
- (United Kingdom) Alfie Hewett / (United Kingdom) Gordon Reid

Wheelchair women's doubles
- (Netherlands) Diede de Groot / (Netherlands) Jiske Griffioen

Wheelchair quad doubles
- (United Kingdom) Andy Lapthorne / (United States) David Wagner

Boys' singles
- (Japan) Rei Sakamoto

Girls' singles
- (Slovakia) Renáta Jamrichová

Boys' doubles
- (United States) Maxwell Exsted / (United States) Cooper Woestendick

Girls' doubles
- (United States) Tyra Caterina Grant / (United States) Iva Jovic
- Australian Open

The 2024 Australian Open was a Grand Slam level tennis tournament held at Melbourne Park, from 14 to 28 January 2024. It was the 112th edition of the Australian Open, the 56th in the Open Era, and the first major of the year. The tournament consists of events for professional players in singles, doubles and mixed doubles. Junior and wheelchair players competed in singles and doubles tournaments. The tournament's main sponsor is Kia.

Novak Djokovic was the defending men's singles champion. He was defeated in the semifinals by Jannik Sinner, who went on to beat Daniil Medvedev in a five-set final to win his first major title. Aryna Sabalenka successfully defended the women's singles title as she claimed her second major singles title, defeating Zheng Qinwen without losing a set during the tournament.

In the tournament's 119-year history, this was the first Australian Open Tennis Championships to be held on an opening Sunday.

The tournament featured the following changes from previous tournaments:

- First-round matches took place over three days instead of two.
- The daytime sessions on the central courts, Rod Laver Arena and Margaret Court Arena, featured a maximum of two matches instead of three to avoid matches lasting into the early hours of the morning, such as the match between Andy Murray and Thanasi Kokkinakis in 2023, which ended at 4:05 am local time. The John Cain Arena schedule remains the same. However, the success of this policy change is questionable, since some matches at this edition of the tournament still finished after midnight, including one between Daniil Medvedev and Emil Ruusuvuori which finished at 3:40 am local time.
- The number of game sessions for the event increased from 47 to 52 with the extra day of competition.

The tournament attracted an attendance of 1,020,763 (1,110,657 including pre-tournament qualifiers), making this the highest attended Australian Open ever, as well as the first Grand Slam to attract over a million spectators in a single tournament.

== Singles players ==
- Men's singles

Champion		Runner-up	
(Italy) Jannik Sinner [4]		Daniil Medvedev [3]	
Semifinals out
(Serbia) Novak Djokovic [1]		(Germany) Alexander Zverev [6]	
Quarterfinals out
(United States) Taylor Fritz [12]	Andrey Rublev [5]	(Poland) Hubert Hurkacz [9]	(Spain) Carlos Alcaraz [2]
4th round out
(France) Adrian Mannarino [20]	(Greece) Stefanos Tsitsipas [7]	Karen Khachanov [15]	(Australia) Alex de Minaur [10]
(France) Arthur Cazaux (WC)	(Portugal) Nuno Borges	(United Kingdom) Cameron Norrie [19]	(Serbia) Miomir Kecmanović
3rd round out
(Argentina) Tomás Martín Etcheverry [30]	(United States) Ben Shelton [16]	(Hungary) Fábián Marozsán	(France) Luca Van Assche
(Argentina) Sebastián Báez [26]	(Czech Republic) Tomáš Macháč	(Italy) Flavio Cobolli (Q)	(United States) Sebastian Korda [29]
(Netherlands) Tallon Griekspoor [28]	(France) Ugo Humbert [21]	(Bulgaria) Grigor Dimitrov [13]	(Canada) Félix Auger-Aliassime [27]
(United States) Alex Michelsen	(Norway) Casper Ruud [11]	(United States) Tommy Paul [14]	(China) Shang Juncheng (WC)
2nd round out
(Australia) Alexei Popyrin	(France) Gaël Monfils	(Spain) Jaume Munar	(Australia) Christopher O'Connell
(France) Hugo Gaston (LL)	(Argentina) Francisco Cerúndolo [22]	(Italy) Lorenzo Musetti [25]	(Australia) Jordan Thompson
(Netherlands) Jesper de Jong (Q)	(Colombia) Daniel Elahi Galán	(United States) Frances Tiafoe [17]	(United States) Aleksandar Kovacevic (Q)
(Italy) Matteo Arnaldi	Pavel Kotov	(France) Quentin Halys	(United States) Christopher Eubanks
(Denmark) Holger Rune [8]	(France) Arthur Fils	(China) Zhang Zhizhen	(Czech Republic) Jakub Menšík (Q)
(Australia) Thanasi Kokkinakis	(Spain) Alejandro Davidovich Fokina [23]	(France) Hugo Grenier (Q)	(Finland) Emil Ruusuvuori
(Slovakia) Lukáš Klein (Q)	(Czech Republic) Jiří Lehečka [32]	(Italy) Giulio Zeppieri (Q)	(Australia) Max Purcell
(United Kingdom) Jack Draper	(Germany) Jan-Lennard Struff [24]	(India) Sumit Nagal (Q)	(Italy) Lorenzo Sonego
1st round out
(Croatia) Dino Prižmić (Q)	(Australia) Marc Polmans (WC)	(Germany) Yannick Hanfmann	(United Kingdom) Andy Murray
(Switzerland) Stan Wawrinka	Alexander Shevchenko	(Chile) Cristian Garín	(Spain) Roberto Bautista Agut
(Argentina) Facundo Díaz Acosta	(Spain) Roberto Carballés Baena	(Croatia) Marin Čilić (PR)	(Australia) Dane Sweeny (Q)
(France) Benjamin Bonzi	(Australia) James Duckworth (WC)	(Australia) Aleksandar Vukic	(Belgium) Zizou Bergs (LL)
(Netherlands) Botic van de Zandschulp	(Argentina) Pedro Cachin	(Australia) Jason Kubler (WC)	(United States) J. J. Wolf
(Croatia) Borna Ćorić	(Japan) Shintaro Mochizuki (LL)	(Chile) Alejandro Tabilo	(Germany) Daniel Altmaier
(Canada) Milos Raonic (PR)	(Australia) Adam Walton (WC)	(France) Arthur Rinderknech	(Chile) Nicolás Jarry [18]
(Czech Republic) Vít Kopřiva (Q)	(South Africa) Lloyd Harris (Q)	(Japan) Taro Daniel	(Brazil) Thiago Seyboth Wild
(Japan) Yoshihito Nishioka	(Serbia) Laslo Djere	(Czech Republic) Jiří Veselý (PR)	Roman Safiullin
(Belgium) David Goffin (Q)	(Argentina) Federico Coria	(Canada) Denis Shapovalov (PR)	(Australia) Omar Jasika (Q)
(Hungary) Márton Fucsovics	(Austria) Sebastian Ofner	(Germany) Maximilian Marterer	(France) Constant Lestienne
(Austria) Dominic Thiem	(France) Alexandre Müller	(United States) Patrick Kypson (WC)	(France) Térence Atmane (Q)
(Germany) Dominik Koepfer	(South Korea) Kwon Soon-woo (PR)	(Australia) James McCabe (WC)	(Spain) Bernabé Zapata Miralles
(Peru) Juan Pablo Varillas	(Serbia) Dušan Lajović	(Hungary) Máté Valkusz (Q)	(Spain) Albert Ramos Viñolas
(France) Grégoire Barrère	(United States) Marcos Giron	(Japan) Yosuke Watanuki	(Australia) Rinky Hijikata
(Kazakhstan) Alexander Bublik [31]	(United States) Mackenzie McDonald	(United Kingdom) Dan Evans	(France) Richard Gasquet

- Women's singles

Champion		Runner-up	
Aryna Sabalenka [2]		(China) Zheng Qinwen [12]	
Semifinals out
(Ukraine) Dayana Yastremska (Q)		(United States) Coco Gauff [4]	
Quarterfinals out
(Czech Republic) Linda Nosková	Anna Kalinskaya	(Ukraine) Marta Kostyuk	(Czech Republic) Barbora Krejčíková [9]
4th round out
(Ukraine) Elina Svitolina [19]	Victoria Azarenka [18]	(Italy) Jasmine Paolini [26]	(France) Océane Dodin
Maria Timofeeva (Q)	(Poland) Magdalena Fręch	Mirra Andreeva	(United States) Amanda Anisimova (PR)
3rd round out
(Poland) Iga Świątek [1]	(Switzerland) Viktorija Golubic	(Latvia) Jeļena Ostapenko [11]	(United States) Emma Navarro [27]
Anna Blinkova	(United States) Sloane Stephens	(China) Wang Yafan	(France) Clara Burel
Elina Avanesyan	(Brazil) Beatriz Haddad Maia [10]	Anastasia Zakharova (Q)	(United States) Alycia Parks
(France) Diane Parry	(Australia) Storm Hunter (Q)	(Spain) Paula Badosa	(Ukraine) Lesia Tsurenko [28]
2nd round out
(United States) Danielle Collins	(United States) McCartney Kessler (WC)	(Bulgaria) Viktoriya Tomova	(Czech Republic) Kateřina Siniaková
(Australia) Ajla Tomljanović (PR)	(Denmark) Clara Tauson	(Italy) Elisabetta Cocciaretto	(France) Varvara Gracheva
(Kazakhstan) Elena Rybakina [3]	(Germany) Tatjana Maria	(Netherlands) Arantxa Rus	Daria Kasatkina [14]
(United Kingdom) Katie Boulter	(United Kingdom) Emma Raducanu (PR)	(Italy) Martina Trevisan	(United States) Jessica Pegula [5]
(Greece) Maria Sakkari [8]	(Belgium) Elise Mertens [25]	(Denmark) Caroline Wozniacki (WC)	Alina Korneeva (Q)
(France) Caroline Garcia [16]	(Slovenia) Kaja Juvan	(Canada) Leylah Fernandez [32]	(United States) Caroline Dolehide
(Tunisia) Ons Jabeur [6]	Kamilla Rakhimova	(Germany) Laura Siegemund	(Germany) Tamara Korpatsch
(Argentina) Nadia Podoroska	Anastasia Pavlyuchenkova	(Spain) Rebeka Masarova	(Czech Republic) Brenda Fruhvirtová (Q)
1st round out
(United States) Sofia Kenin	(Germany) Angelique Kerber (PR)	(France) Fiona Ferro (Q)	(Czech Republic) Marie Bouzková [31]
(Australia) Taylah Preston (WC)	(United States) Kayla Day	(Romania) Jaqueline Cristian	Veronika Kudermetova [15]
(Australia) Kimberly Birrell (WC)	(Croatia) Petra Martić	(Belgium) Greet Minnen	(Italy) Camila Giorgi
(China) Wang Xiyu	(Switzerland) Lulu Sun (Q)	(Belgium) Yanina Wickmayer	(Czech Republic) Markéta Vondroušová [7]
(Czech Republic) Karolína Plíšková	(Spain) Cristina Bucșa	(Colombia) Camila Osorio	Diana Shnaider
(Ukraine) Anhelina Kalinina [24]	(United States) Katie Volynets (Q)	(Australia) Olivia Gadecki (WC)	(United States) Peyton Stearns
(United States) Ashlyn Krueger	(China) Yuan Yue	(United States) Shelby Rogers (PR)	(Romania) Sorana Cîrstea [22]
(China) Zhu Lin [29]	(Mexico) Renata Zarazúa (Q)	(Serbia) Aleksandra Krunić (PR)	(Canada) Rebecca Marino (Q)
(Japan) Nao Hibino	(China) Bai Zhuoxuan	(United States) Claire Liu	(Egypt) Mayar Sherif
(Poland) Magda Linette [20]	(France) Alizé Cornet (WC)	(Spain) Sara Sorribes Tormo	(Czech Republic) Linda Fruhvirtová
(Japan) Naomi Osaka (PR)	(Australia) Daria Saville (WC)	(Kazakhstan) Yulia Putintseva	Anastasia Potapova [23]
(Czech Republic) Sára Bejlek (Q)	(Ukraine) Daria Snigur (Q)	(France) Léolia Jeanjean (Q)	(Slovakia) Anna Karolína Schmiedlová
(Ukraine) Yulia Starodubtseva (Q)	(United States) Bernarda Pera	(United States) Emina Bektas	(China) Wang Xinyu [30]
Ekaterina Alexandrova [17]	(Italy) Sara Errani	(United Kingdom) Jodie Burrage	(Japan) Mai Hontama (WC)
Liudmila Samsonova [13]	(Slovenia) Tamara Zidanšek	(United States) Taylor Townsend	(Croatia) Donna Vekić [21]
(Italy) Lucia Bronzetti	Aliaksandra Sasnovich	(Romania) Ana Bogdan	(Germany) Ella Seidel (Q)

== Events ==
=== Men's singles ===
- (Italy) Jannik Sinner def. Daniil Medvedev, 3–6, 3–6, 6–4, 6–4, 6–3.

=== Women's singles ===
- Aryna Sabalenka def. (China) Zheng Qinwen, 6–3, 6–2.

=== Men's doubles ===
- (India) Rohan Bopanna / (Australia) Matthew Ebden def. (Italy) Simone Bolelli / (Italy) Andrea Vavassori, 7–6^{(7–0)}, 7–5.

=== Women's doubles ===
- (Chinese Taipei) Hsieh Su-wei / (Belgium) Elise Mertens def. (Ukraine) Lyudmyla Kichenok / (Latvia) Jeļena Ostapenko, 6–1, 7–5.

=== Mixed doubles ===
- (Chinese Taipei) Hsieh Su-wei / (Poland) Jan Zieliński def. (United States) Desirae Krawczyk / (United Kingdom) Neal Skupski, 6–7^{(5–7)}, 6–4, [11–9].

=== Wheelchair men's singles ===
- (Japan) Tokito Oda def. (United Kingdom) Alfie Hewett, 6–2, 6–4.

=== Wheelchair women's singles ===
- (Netherlands) Diede de Groot def. (Japan) Yui Kamiji, 7–5, 6–4.

=== Wheelchair quad singles ===
- (Netherlands) Sam Schröder def. (Israel) Guy Sasson, 6–3, 6–3.

=== Wheelchair men's doubles ===
- (United Kingdom) Alfie Hewett / (United Kingdom) Gordon Reid def. (Japan) Takuya Miki / (Japan) Tokito Oda, 6–3, 6–2.

=== Wheelchair women's doubles ===
- (Netherlands) Diede de Groot / (Netherlands) Jiske Griffioen def. (Japan) Yui Kamiji / (South Africa) Kgothatso Montjane, 6–3, 7–6^{(7–2)}.

=== Wheelchair quad doubles ===
- (United Kingdom) Andy Lapthorne / (United States) David Wagner def. (South Africa) Donald Ramphadi / (Israel) Guy Sasson, 6–4, 3–6, [10–2].

=== Boys' singles ===
- (Japan) Rei Sakamoto def. (Czech Republic) Jan Kumstát, 3–6, 7–6^{(7–2)}, 7–5.

=== Girls' singles ===
- (Slovakia) Renáta Jamrichová def. (Australia) Emerson Jones, 6–4, 6–1.

=== Boys' doubles ===
- (United States) Maxwell Exsted / (United States) Cooper Woestendick def. (Czech Republic) Petr Brunclík / (United Kingdom) Viktor Frydrych, 6–3, 7–5.

=== Girls' doubles ===
- (United States) Tyra Caterina Grant / (United States) Iva Jovic def. (Czech Republic) Julie Paštiková / (Germany) Julia Stusek, 6–3, 6–1.

== Points and prize money ==
=== Point distribution ===
Below is a series of tables for each competition showing the ranking points offered for each event.

==== Senior points ====
Event	W	F	SF	QF	Round of 16	Round of 32	Round of 64	Round of 128	Q	Q3	Q2	Q1
Men's singles	2000	1300	800	400	200	100	50	10	30	16	8	0
Men's doubles	2000	1200	720	360	180	90	0	N/A				
Women's singles	2000	1300	780	430	240	130	70	10	40	30	20	2
Women's doubles	2000	1300	780	430	240	130	10	N/A				

==== Wheelchair points ====
Event	W	F	SF	QF	Round of 16
Singles	800	500	375	200	100
Doubles	800	500	375	100	N/A
Quad singles	800	500	375	200	100
Quad doubles	800	500	375	100	N/A

==== Junior points ====
Event	W	F	SF	QF	Round of 16	Round of 32	Q	Q3
Boys' singles	1000	700	490	300	180	90	25	20
Girls' singles	1000	700	490	300	180	90	25	20
Boys' doubles	750	525	367	225	135	N/A		
Girls' doubles	750	525	367	225	135	N/A		

=== Prize money ===
The Australian Open total prize money for 2024 increased by 13.07% year on year to a tournament record A$86,500,000. Most of the increases were distributed to qualifying and the early rounds of singles and doubles, with First round main draw singles players receiving A$120,000, up 12.94 per cent vs 2023. The total represented a 162% increase in prize money over the last ten years, from the A$33 million on offer in 2014.

Event	W	F	SF	QF	Round of 16	Round of 32	Round of 64	Round of 128	Q3	Q2	Q1
Singles	A$3,150,000	A$1,725,000	A$990,000	A$600,000	A$375,000	A$255,000	A$180,000	A$120,000	A$65,000	A$44,100	A$31,250
Doubles	A$730,000	A$400,000	A$227,500	A$128,000	A$75,000	A$53,000	A$36,000	N/A			
Mixed doubles	A$165,000	A$94,000	A$50,000	A$26,500	A$13,275	A$6,900	N/A				
Wheelchair singles	A$	A$	A$	A$	N/A						
Wheelchair doubles	A$	A$	A$	N/A	N/A						
Quad singles	A$	A$	A$	N/A	N/A						
Quad doubles	A$	A$	N/A	N/A	N/A						

Preceded by 2023 US Open	Grand Slams	Succeeded by 2024 French Open
