= 2024 Australian Open – Men's singles final =

Australian Open tennis final

2024 Australian Open Men's Final
- (Italy) Jannik Sinner (4) vs. Daniil Medvedev (3)
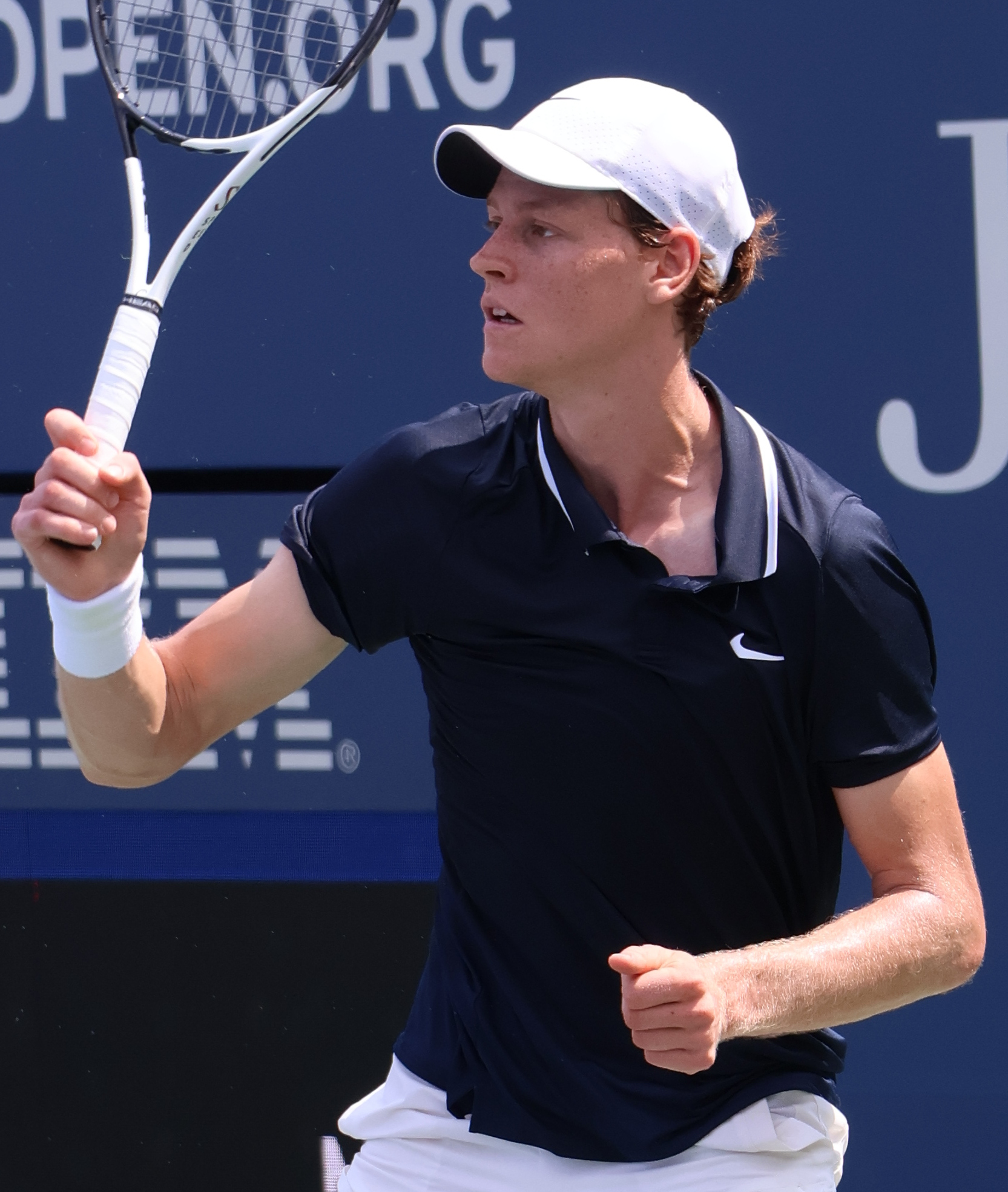
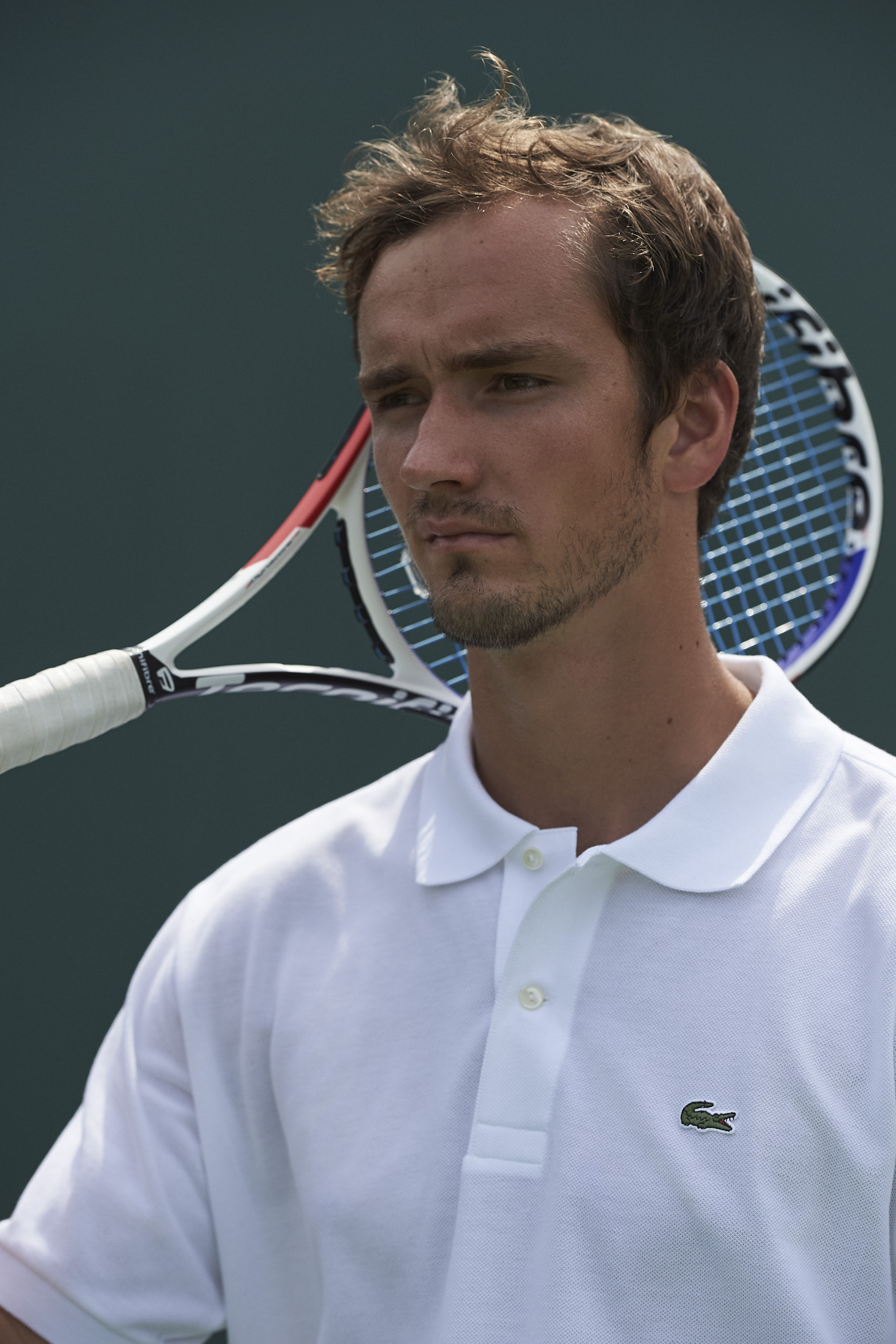
- Jannik Sinner (left) and Daniil Medvedev (right)
Set	1	2	3	4	5
(Italy) Jannik Sinner (4)	3	3	6	6	6
Daniil Medvedev (3)	6	6	4	4	3
- Date: 28 January 2024
- Tournament: Australian Open
- Location: Melbourne, Australia
- Chair umpire: Aurélie Tourte
- Duration: 3 hours, 44 minutes

The 2024 Australian Open Men's Singles final was the championship tennis match of the men's singles tournament at the 2024 Australian Open, contested by fourth-seed Jannik Sinner and third-seed Daniil Medvedev. Sinner came back to defeat Medvedev from two-sets-to-love down, marking the second such loss for Medvedev in the Australian Open final after his defeat to Rafael Nadal in the 2022 final.

It was Sinner's first major final. He became the second Italian man in the Open Era to win a singles major, after Adriano Panatta at the 1976 French Open, and the first new Australian Open champion in ten years, since Stan Wawrinka in 2014. At 22, Sinner was the youngest Australian Open men's singles champion and finalist since Novak Djokovic in 2008. This was the first Australian Open final since 2005 not to feature any of the Big Three members. The final further established their rivalry, being their 10th meeting and Sinner's 4th consecutive win over Medvedev.

Medvedev set an Open Era record for the most time spent playing at a singles major, at 24 hours and 17 minutes. Medvedev also became the first player in the Open Era to lose two major finals after having a two-set lead.

== Background ==
Entering the final, Medvedev lead the career head-to-head 6–3. However, Sinner had won their last three matches, including the most recent match at the 2023 ATP Finals, all on hardcourt.

In the semifinals, Sinner defeated the defending champion and world No. 1 Novak Djokovic, ending his 33-match winning streak at the Australian Open (dating back from the 2019 tournament), as well as marking the Serbian's first-ever defeat in an Australian Open semifinal and his first defeat in any major semifinal since the 2019 French Open. Also in the semifinals, Medvedev came back from two-sets-to-love down against Alexander Zverev to reach a third Australian Open final. Medvedev had already played two other five-set matches, against Emil Ruusuvuori in the second round (when he came back from two-sets-to-love down as well) and against Hubert Hurkacz in the quarterfinals.

Overall, Medvedev dropped eight sets en route to the final while Sinner had dropped only one set, in his semifinal match against Djokovic.

== Statistics ==
Category	Sinner	Medvedev
1st serve %	88 of 144 = 61%	95 of 139 = 68%
Aces	14	11
Double faults	5	3
Winners	50	44
Unforced errors	49	57
Winners − Unforced errors	+1	–13
Winning % on 1st serve	65 of 88 = 74%	72 of 95 = 76%
Winning % on 2nd serve	30 of 56 = 54%	20 of 44 = 45%
Receiving points won	44 of 139 = 32%	44 of 144 = 31%
Break point conversions	4 of 9 = 44%	4 of 12 = 33%
Net points won	14 of 21 = 67%	32 of 45 = 71%
Total points won	142	141
Fastest serve	207 km/h (129 mph)	212 km/h (132 mph)
Average 1st serve speed	196 km/h (122 mph)	193 km/h (120 mph)
Average 2nd serve speed	159 km/h (99 mph)	151 km/h (94 mph)

_{Source}

== See also ==
- 2022 Australian Open – Men's singles final
