= Daniil Medvedev =

Russian tennis player (born 1996)

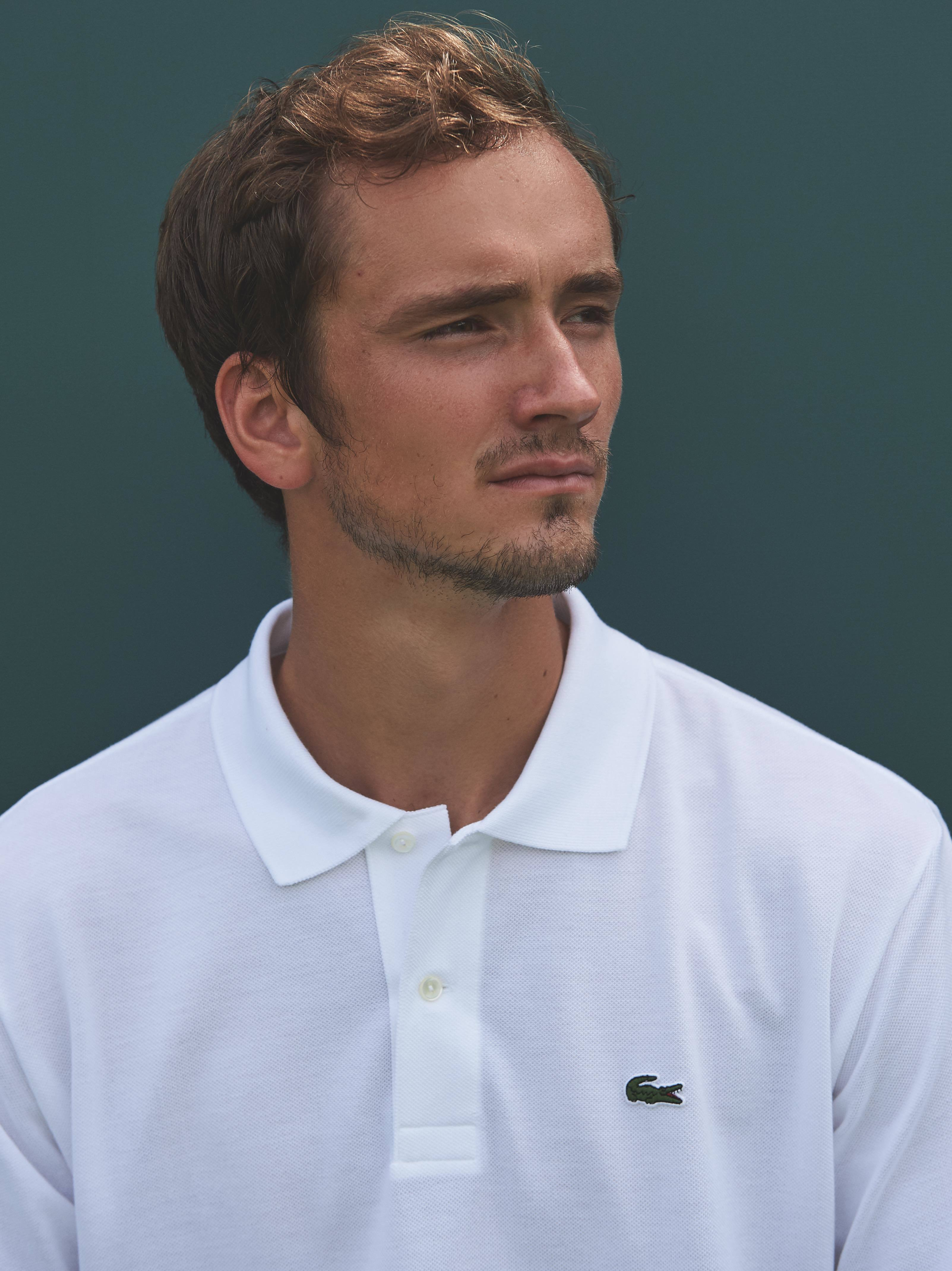
- Medvedev at the 2019 Miami Open
- Full name: Daniil Sergeyevich Medvedev
- Native name: Даниил Сергеевич Медведев
- Country (sports): Russia
- Residence: Monte Carlo, Monaco
- Born: 11 February 1996 (age 30) Moscow, Russia
- Height: 1.98 m (6 ft 6 in)
- Turned pro: 2014
- Plays: Right-handed (two-handed backhand)
- Coach: Andrey Golubev (2026–), Rohan Goetzke (2025–2026), Thomas Johansson (2025–2026), Gilles Cervara (2017–2025)
- Prize money: US $55,009,356: 8th all-time in earnings

Singles
- Career record: 472–200 (70.2%)
- Career titles: 25
- Highest ranking: No. 1 (28 February 2022)
- Current ranking: No. 5 (9 November 2026)

Grand Slam singles results
- Australian Open: F (2021, 2022, 2024)
- French Open: QF (2021)
- Wimbledon: SF (2023, 2024)
- US Open: W (2021)

Other tournaments
- Tour Finals: W (2020)
- Olympic Games: QF (2021)

Doubles
- Career record: 20–30
- Career titles: 0
- Highest ranking: No. 170 (19 August 2019)
- Current ranking: No. 349 (28 September 2026)

Grand Slam doubles results
- French Open: 1R (2017)
- US Open: 2R (2017)

Other doubles tournaments
- Olympic Games: 1R (2020, 2024)

Grand Slam mixed doubles results
- US Open: QF (2025)

Other mixed doubles tournaments
- Olympic Games: 1R (2024)

Team competitions
- Davis Cup: W (2021)
- Last updated on: 3 October 2026.

Daniil Sergeyevich Medvedev (Note: Russian: Даниил Сергеевич Медведев, IPA: [dənʲɪˈil sʲɪrˈɡʲe(j)ɪvʲɪtɕ mʲɪdˈvʲedʲɪf]) (born 11 February 1996) is a Russian professional tennis player. He has been ranked as the world No. 1 in men's singles by the Association of Tennis Professionals (ATP). Medvedev has won 25 ATP Tour–level singles titles, including a major at the 2021 US Open, as well as the 2020 ATP Finals and six ATP Masters 1000 events.

Medvedev made his ATP Tour main draw debut in 2015. He broke through in 2019, debuting in the top 10 and reaching six consecutive tournament finals, including at the US Open. In 2020 Medvedev won the ATP Finals, defeating the world's top three players in the world en route. In 2021, he contested his second and third major finals, winning his first title at the US Open and denying Novak Djokovic the Grand Slam. He also helped the Russian Davis Cup team secure victory in 2021. Shortly after reaching a fourth major final at the 2022 Australian Open, Medvedev became the world No. 1 for the first time. He was the first man outside the Big Four to attain the No. 1 ranking in nearly 20 years, and the 27th man overall.

From 2023 onwards, Medvedev has reached two more majors finals (at the 2023 US Open and 2024 Australian Open), but with inconsistent form. Following a first career title on clay at the 2023 Italian Open, he did not win another tournament for over two years. Since ending his title drought in late 2025, he has returned to the world's top 5.

== Early life ==
Daniil Medvedev was born in Moscow to Sergey Medvedev and Olga Medvedeva. Daniil's father, a computer engineer, developed his own business of building materials sales, from the mid-1980s to the early 2010s. Medvedev has two older sisters named Julia and Elena, 12 and 8 years his senior, respectively.

When Daniil was six years old, his mother noticed an advertisement for group tennis lessons at the pool where he was taking swimming lessons. His father encouraged him to enroll. Medvedev's first tennis teacher was Ekaterina Kryuchkova, a former coach of professional tennis player Vera Zvonareva among others. Daniil's other childhood activities besides sport included harpsichord and guitar lessons.

Medvedev studied physics and maths at a specialized school before graduating early and enrolling in economics and commerce at the Moscow State Institute of International Relations. He later dropped out to focus on tennis. He then switched to the Russian State University of Physical Education, Sport, Youth and Tourism, where he received his diploma as coach. With his family he moved to Antibes, France where he trained at the tennis academy. His parents have been living in France as retirees since.

== Personal life ==
As a result of living mostly overseas after turning 18, Medvedev can speak French and English fluently, besides his native Russian. He is a fan of FC Bayern Munich. He is also a fan of the Cincinnati Reds.

Medvedev married Daria Chernyshkova, a Moscow State University graduate and former juniors tennis player, in Moscow on 12 September 2018. On 14 October 2022, they announced the birth of their daughter, Alisa. On 7 January 2025, they announced the birth of their second daughter, Vika. His best friend and fellow tennis player, Andrey Rublev, is the godfather to Alisa. In September 2019, he credited his marriage for the improvement of his tennis results: "Before I made a proposal, I had been on the 65th place in the ranking, and then in ten months I've won two major tournaments and entered the top 10. We have significantly rebuilt our life, we work for each other. I earn [money], and Daria helps me to earn more".

In March 2026, following his participation in the 2026 Dubai Tennis Championships, Daniil Medvedev was temporarily stranded in Dubai along with his family and fellow tennis players Andrey Rublev and Karen Khachanov due to airspace closures amid escalating conflict in the Middle East. The disruption followed Iranian missile and drone attacks across the Gulf region, which led to temporary closure of airspace in the United Arab Emirates and widespread travel uncertainty.

Medvedev later travelled to the United States to take part in the 2026 BNP Paribas Open via Oman after restrictions were eased.

== Junior career ==
Medvedev played his first junior match in July 2009 at the age of 13 at a grade 4 tournament in Estonia. In December 2010, he won his first junior title as a qualifier at just his third tournament in Ust-Kamenogarsk, Kazakhstan, a grade 5 carpet tournament.

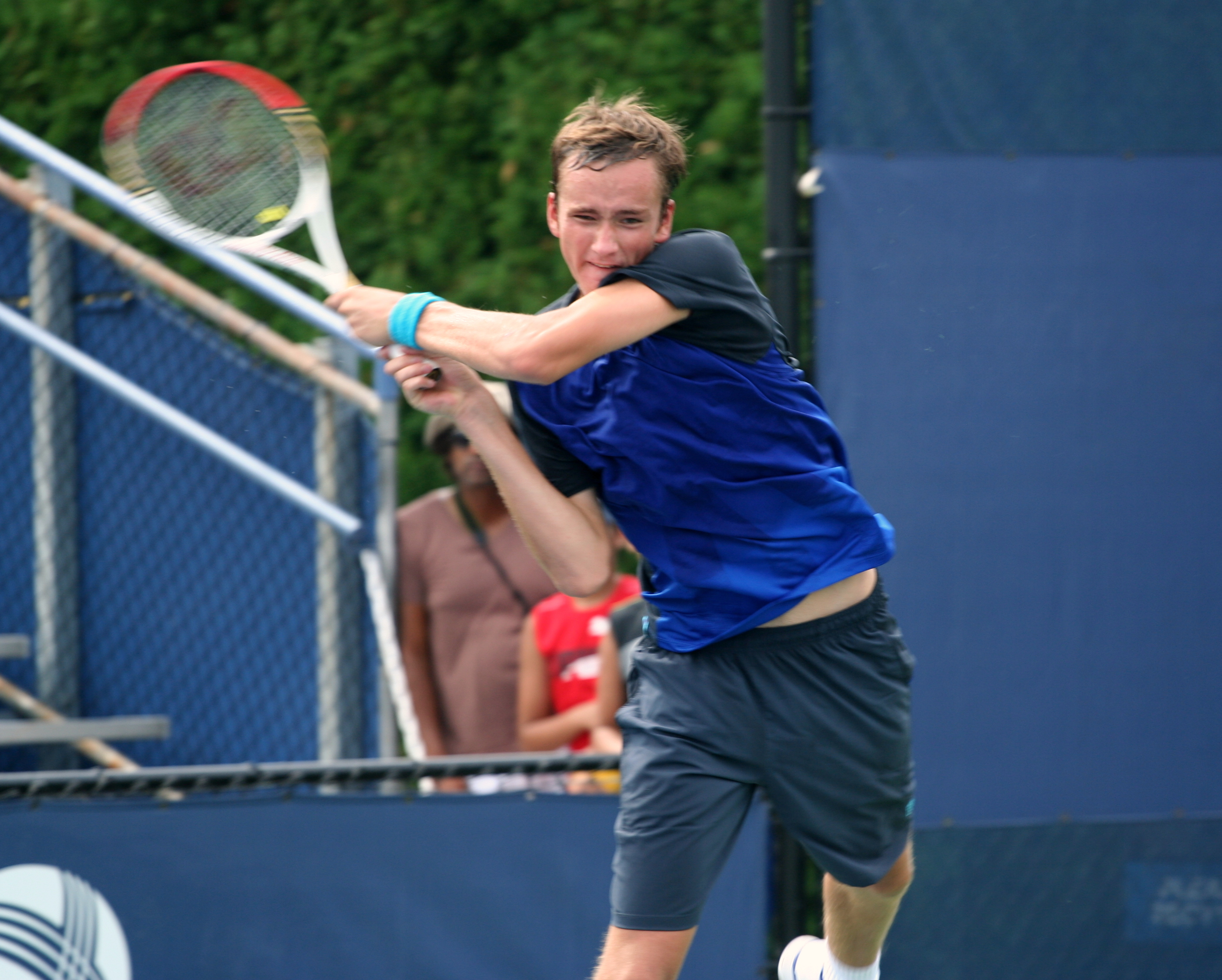
Medvedev at the 2013 US Open

In 2012–2013 seasons, the young Russian had significant results on the junior circuit as he won six titles between October 2012 and July 2013, which included four consecutive titles. He made his junior Grand Slam debut at 2013 Junior Wimbledon, where he won his first round match against Hong Seong-chan but lost in the second round to 2nd seed Nikola Milojević. That tournament was his first time on a grass court. At the 2013 Junior US Open, he went into the tournament seeded 10th and made the third round where he lost to Johan Tatlot.

Medvedev reached his career-high junior ranking of world No. 13 at the beginning of 2014 and went into the 2014 Junior Australian Open seeded 8th. He ended his junior career after a first round loss at 2014 Junior Wimbledon.

Medvedev ended his junior career with an overall win–loss record of 109–43 and wins over several future stars including Alexander Zverev and Reilly Opelka.

Junior Grand Slam results – singles:

Australian Open: 3R (2014)
French Open: 3R (2014)
Wimbledon: 2R (2013)
US Open: 3R (2013)

== Professional career ==
=== 2015–2016: Early pro career ===
Medvedev made his ATP main draw debut at the 2015 Kremlin Cup, partnering Aslan Karatsev in the doubles event. The two defeated Aliaksandr Bury and Denis Istomin in the first round but were defeated by Radu Albot and František Čermák in the second round.

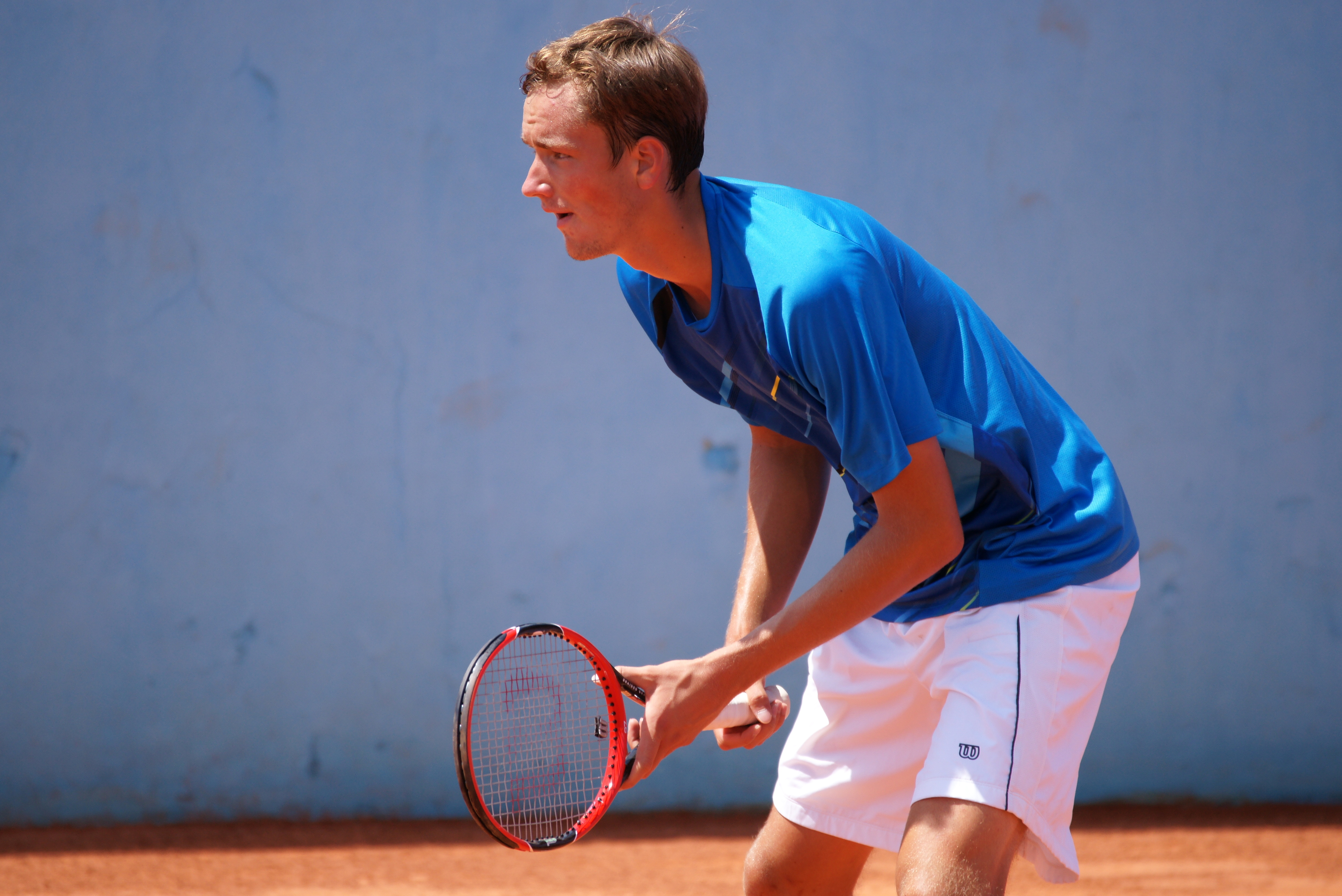
Medvedev at the 2015 Nice Open

As a qualifier, Medvedev made his ATP singles main draw debut at the 2016 Nice Open, losing to Guido Pella in three sets. Three weeks later he earned his first singles ATP World Tour win at the 2016 Ricoh Open, defeating Horacio Zeballos in straight sets.

Medvedev was disqualified from the second round of the Savannah Challenger event (in Georgia, U.S.) for comments he made after the umpire ruled in favor of his opponent. Medvedev thought he had won a break point against his opponent Donald Young's serve, but chair umpire Sandy French ruled that his returning shot had gone out. After that, Medvedev said Young and French were friends. As both parties are black, he was disqualified mid-match for allegedly 'question[ing] the impartiality of the umpire based on her race'.

=== 2017: First ATP final ===
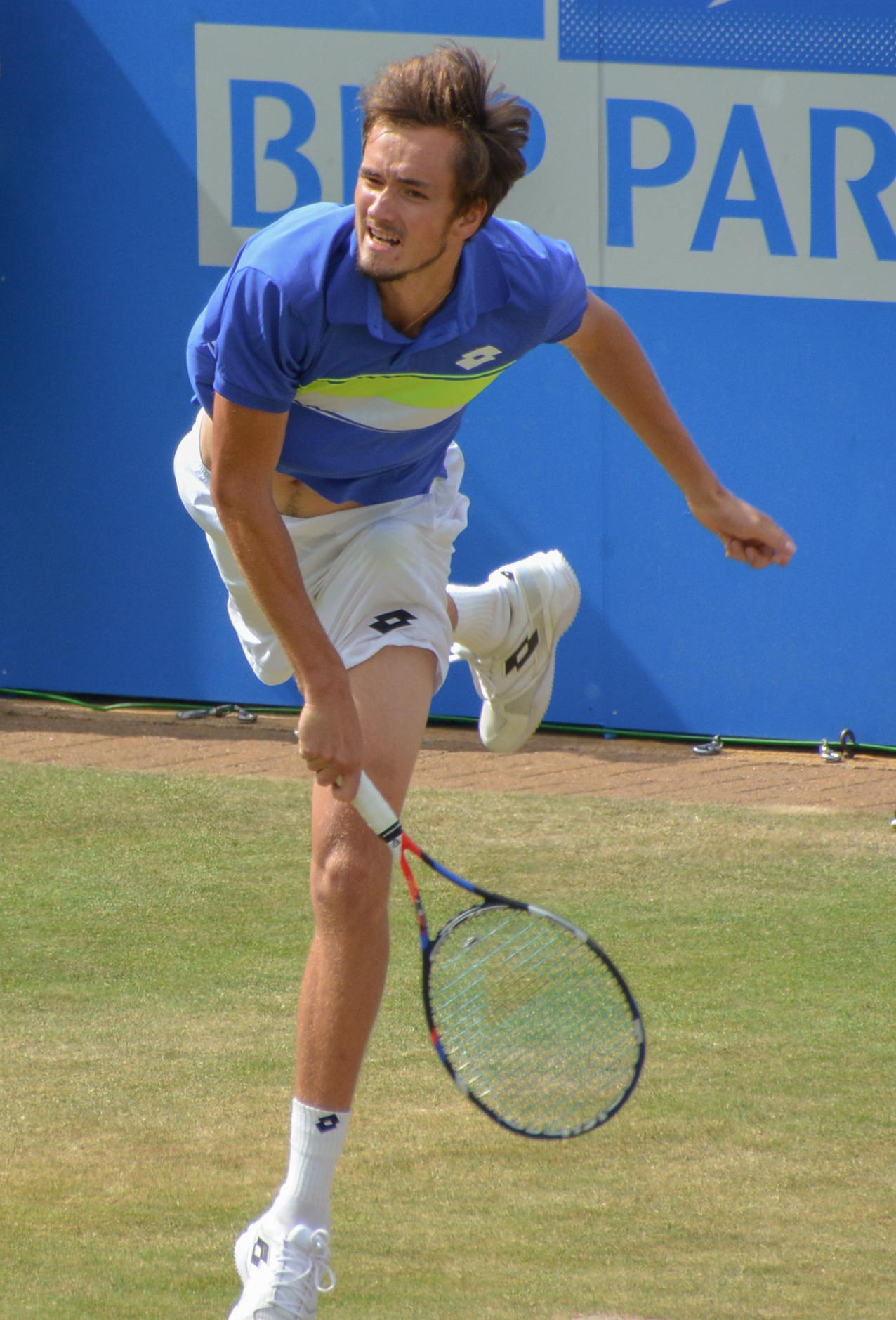
Medvedev serving at the 2017 Queen's Club Championships

In January 2017, Medvedev reached his first ATP singles final. In the final at the Chennai Open he lost to Roberto Bautista Agut in two sets. As a result, Medvedev jumped 34 positions from 99 to 65 in the ATP rankings, a new career-high. In February, he advanced to the quarterfinals of both the Open Sud de France and the Open 13, losing to Jo-Wilfried Tsonga and Lucas Pouille respectively.

In June, he made it to the quarterfinals of the Rosmalen Grass Court Championships, defeating the 6th seed, Robin Haase, and Thanasi Kokkinakis before losing to Ivo Karlović in straight sets. At the Aegon Championships, he advanced to his first ATP 500 quarterfinal by beating Nicolas Mahut and Kokkinakis in the first two rounds, before losing to the No. 6 seed, Grigor Dimitrov, in the quarterfinals. One week later, he on grass advanced to the semifinal of Eastbourne International, losing to Novak Djokovic.

Medvedev registered his maiden Grand Slam match win at the 2017 Wimbledon Championships, defeating fifth seed and world No. 3, Stan Wawrinka, in the first round in four sets. He lost in the next round to Ruben Bemelmans. Medvedev was handed three fines totaling $14,500 (£11,200) for his conduct during the match with Bemelmans: $7,000 for insulting the umpire on two occasions and $7,500 for throwing coins under the umpire's chair.

=== 2018: First ATP titles ===
Medvedev started the 2018 season by qualifying for the Sydney International. He reached the final, which he won against Australian Alex de Minaur. The final was the youngest ATP Tour tournament final since 20-year-old Rafael Nadal defeated a 19-year-old Novak Djokovic in the final of the 2007 Indian Wells Masters. It also was the tournament's youngest final since 1989.

In August, Medvedev won his second ATP title at the 2018 Winston-Salem Open after defeating Steve Johnson in straight sets. In October, Medvedev won his first ATP 500 and third career ATP title in Tokyo as a qualifier, overcoming Japanese star and No. 3 seed Kei Nishikori in straight sets in the final. This triumph brought him to a new career high ranking of No. 22 and made him the No. 1 player in Russia. The victory also marked the third consecutive final that Medvedev had beaten the home favorite in to win the title. Medvedev reached the Kremlin Cup semifinal, losing to his countryman and eventual champion Karen Khachanov. One week later, he made the semifinals at the Swiss Indoors, which he lost to Roger Federer. After the tournament, he achieved a new career high ranking of world No. 16.

Medvedev finished 2018 with the most hard court match wins of any player on the ATP Tour (38 wins). He also had the most titles on hard court tournaments (3 titles), tying with Roger Federer, Novak Djokovic and Karen Khachanov.

=== 2019: Two Masters titles, US Open final ===
Medvedev started the season by reaching the final of the Brisbane International, defeating Andy Murray, Milos Raonic and Jo-Wilfried Tsonga en route, but then lost to Kei Nishikori. At the Australian Open, he was seeded 15th, the first time he was seeded at a major. He reached the round of 16 for the first time in his career, where he was defeated by eventual champion Novak Djokovic. In February, Medvedev won his fourth ATP title at the Sofia Open, beating Márton Fucsovics in the final. The following week, Medvedev lost in the semifinals of Rotterdam to Gaël Monfils. Medvedev entered the Monte Carlo Masters having only won two of his 13 career matches on clay courts. Despite this, he reached his first ever Masters 1000 quarterfinal at the event after defeating world No. 8 Stefanos Tsitsipas. In the quarterfinals, Medvedev earned his first win over a world number 1 ranked player after he defeated Djokovic in three sets. He lost in the semifinals to Dušan Lajović.

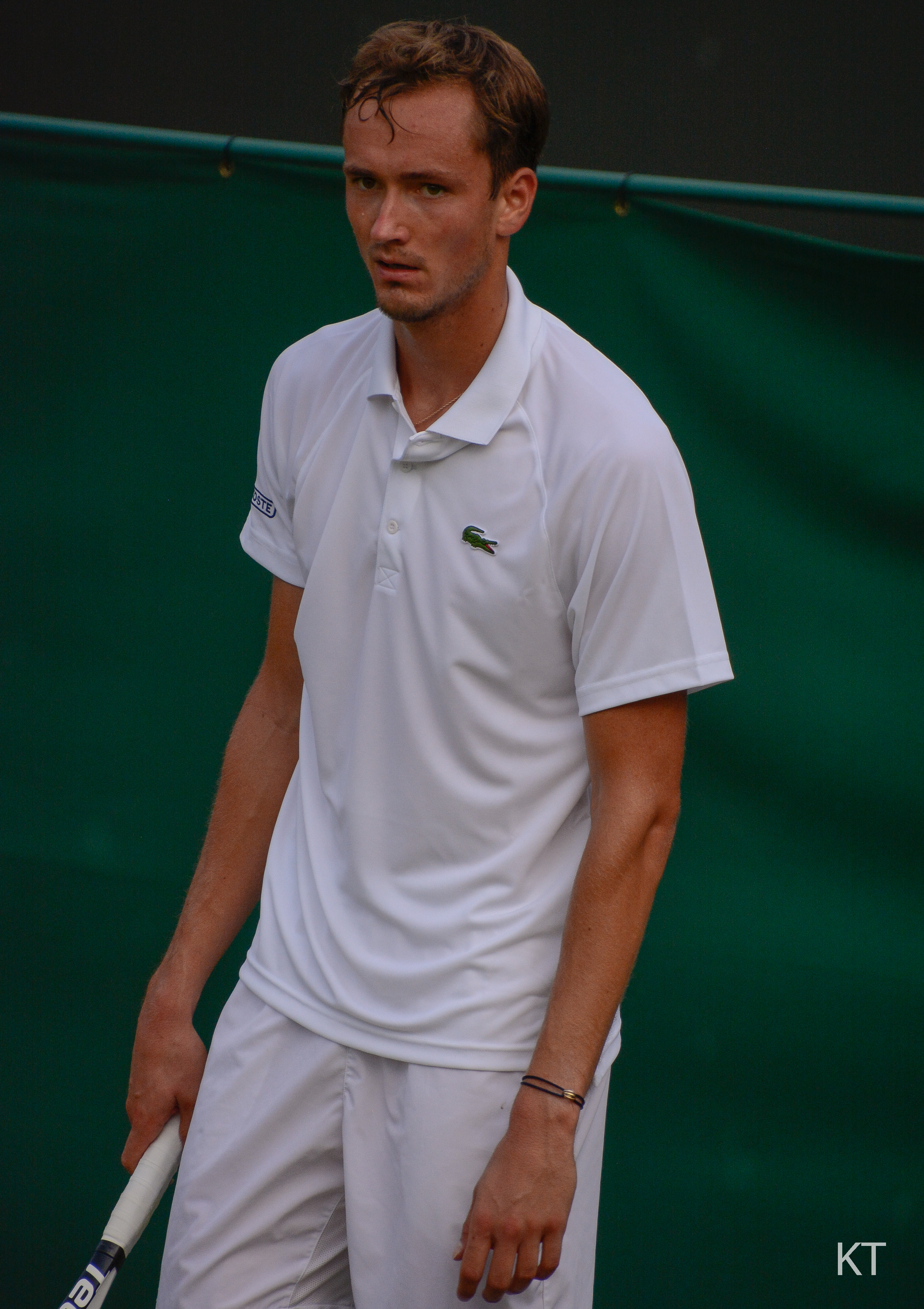
Medvedev at the 2019 Wimbledon Championships

At the Barcelona Open, Medvedev earned his third successive top 10 victory (this time over Kei Nishikori) to reach his first clay-court final where he was defeated by world No. 5 Dominic Thiem. Following a victory over Nishikori, Medvedev experienced a five-match losing streak, including an opening-round defeat at the French Open. He returned to form on the grass courts of Queen's Club, reaching his sixth semifinal of the season where he lost to Gilles Simon. Medvedev made his top 10 debut after reaching the third round of Wimbledon.

Medvedev reached four tournament finals in 2019 (in Washington, Montreal, Cincinnati, and the US Open), becoming only the third man in tennis history to do so (after Ivan Lendl and Andre Agassi). In Washington, he was defeated by Nick Kyrgios in the final. He followed with a strong performance at the Rogers Cup, reaching his first Masters final after winning againat top 10 players Dominic Thiem and Karen Khachanov. In the final, he lost to defending champion Rafael Nadal. Medvedev reached his second consecutive Masters final at Cincinnati after beating defending champion Djokovic for the second time. He defeated David Goffin in straight sets in the final to win his first Masters title.

Medvedev entered the US Open as the world No. 5. In his second round match, he fought off cramping to defeat Hugo Dellien in four sets. He then defeated Feliciano López in a contentious match for which he was fined $5,000 for unsportsmanlike conduct and $4,000 for flipping off the crowd. Medvedev recovered from a set and a break deficit to beat Dominik Köpfer and reach his first major quarterfinal. After beating former champion Stan Wawrinka in the quarterfinals and Grigor Dimitrov in the semifinals, Medvedev earned a spot in his first Grand Slam final. He lost to Rafael Nadal in five sets.

Medvedev followed up on his success in North America with his first title in Russia at the St. Petersburg Open, becoming the first Russian to win the tournament in 15 years. Medvedev won a second consecutive title at the Shanghai Masters, defeating Alexander Zverev in the final. By reaching the final, Medvedev became the seventh man since 2000 to reach at least nine finals in a season. He ended the season losing his last four matches, including all three round robin matches in his ATP Finals debut.

=== 2020: ATP Finals champion, third Masters title ===
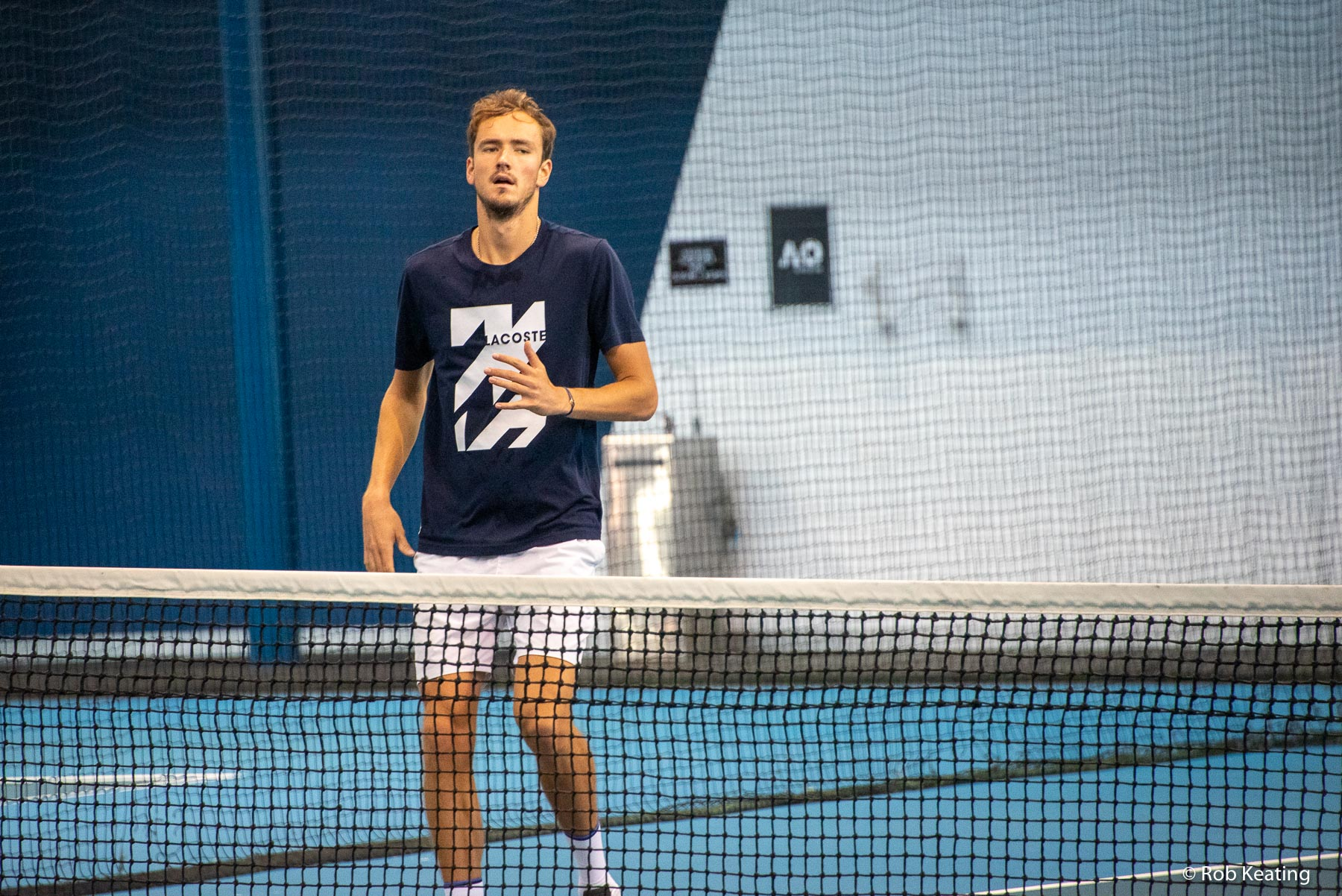
Medvedev at the 2020 Australian Open

Medvedev opened the 2020 season as Russia's top ranked singles player.at the inaugural edition of the ATP Cup He led Russia to the semifinals, where they were eliminated by the Serbian team after Medvedev lost to world No. 2 Novak Djokovic. At the Australian Open, Medvedev was eliminated in the fourth round by former champion Stan Wawrinka in five sets. During the February indoor season, Medvedev suffered early defeats in Rotterdam and Marseille.

Following the six month hiatus caused by the COVID-19 pandemic, Medvedev failed to defend his title at Cincinnati Masters, losing to Roberto Bautista Agut in the quarterfinals. As the third seed in the US Open, Medvedev reached the semifinals before losing to eventual champion Dominic Thiem. At the French Open, Medvedev exited the tournament in the first round for the fourth consecutive year, losing to Márton Fucsovics. After poor results in the St. Petersburg Open and Vienna Open, Medvedev resurged, winning his first title in a year at the Paris Masters.

At the 2020 ATP Finals, Medvedev won all his round-robin matches in straight sets over Alexander Zverev, Novak Djokovic and Diego Schwartzman. He came back from a set and break deficit to defeat Rafael Nadal in the semifinals, before beating Dominic Thiem in the final, which he also won after being a set down. With the victory, Medvedev became the first player to have defeated the world's top three players at the ATP Finals.

=== 2021: US Open, Davis and ATP Cups champion ===
At the second edition of the ATP Cup in February, Medvedev led Russia to the title, going 4–0 in singles. This included 3 top ten victories (over Diego Schwartzman, Alexander Zverev, and Matteo Berrettini) extending his win streak over top 10 opponents to ten wins. Medvedev then reached his second Grand Slam final at the Australian Open after straight sets victories over Andrey Rublev and Stefanos Tsitsipas, extending his win streak against top 10 opponents to twelve wins, and his overall win streak to twenty wins. In the final, he was defeated by the defending champion Novak Djokovic in straight sets.

Medvedev won his first title of the season at the Open 13 in Marseille, defeating Pierre-Hugues Herbert in the final. With the win, Medvedev ascended to world No. 2 in the ATP rankings, becoming the first man outside of the Big Four to occupy a position in the top 2 since Lleyton Hewitt in July 2005. On 13 April, Medvedev tested positive for COVID-19 and was forced to withdraw from the Monte-Carlo Masters. At the French Open, Medvedev reached the quarterfinals, where he lost to eventual runner-up Stefanos Tsitsipas.

During the grass-court season, Medvedev took a wildcard to compete in the Mallorca Championships, where he won his first career grass-court title. At Wimbledon, he reached the fourth round for the first time in his career. There, he lost to Hubert Hurkacz in a match plagued by rain delays. Medvedev entered both the men's singles and the men's doubles events at the 2020 Summer Olympics. In doubles, Medvedev and Aslan Karatsev were defeated in the first round by Slovakia's Filip Polášek and Lukáš Klein. In singles, he defeated Kazakhstan's Alexander Bublik, India's Sumit Nagal, and Italy's Fabio Fognini to reach the quarterfinals. In the quarterfinals, he lost to Spain's Pablo Carreño Busta. To start the North American hardcourt season, Medvedev competed at the Canadian Open, where he won the title after defeating Reilly Opelka in the final. The following week, he competed at the Cincinnati Masters, reaching the semifinals where he was defeated by Andrey Rublev.

At the US Open, Medvedev dropped just one set en route to his first major title, defeating Novak Djokovic in the final. The final received immense attention, as Djokovic was vying to become only the second man in the Open Era to achieve the calendar-year Grand Slam.

Following the US Open, Medvedev participated in the Laver Cup as part of Team Europe. Team Europe comfortably won the title, with Medvedev winning his match against Denis Shapovalov in straight sets. At the Indian Wells Masters, Medvedev was upset in the fourth round by Grigor Dimitrov. At the Paris Masters, Medvedev reached the final for the second consecutive year, but lost to Novak Djokovic in three sets. In his third ATP Finals, Medvedev qualified for the semifinals after winning all of his round-robin matches. He defeated Casper Ruud before losing to Alexander Zverev in straight sets in the final. Medvedev ended his 2021 season by leading Russia to the Davis Cup title, not dropping a set through his five singles matches.

=== 2022: Australian Open final, world No. 1 ===
Medvedev represented Russia in the third edition of the ATP Cup. Russia advanced to the semifinals of the tournament after Medvedev and Roman Safiullin went undefeated in doubles. There, Medvedev won his singles match against Canada's Félix Auger-Aliassime, but Russia was eliminated when Medvedev and Safiullin were defeated in the decisive doubles rubber.

In January, Medvedev reached the final of the Australian Open for the second consecutive year. En route to the final, he beat home favorite Nick Kyrgios, world No. 10 Auger-Aliassime (saving match point), and world No. 4 Stefanos Tsitsipas. In the final, he lost in five sets to Rafael Nadal despite taking a two-set lead. At 5 hours and 24 minutes, it was the second longest major final ever played. In February, Medvedev was nominated for the Laureus World Sports Award for Breakthrough of the Year award.

Medvedev entered the Mexican Open with the opportunity to gain the world No. 1 ranking from Novak Djokovic. Medvedev reached the semifinals where he was defeated once again by Nadal in a rematch of the Australian Open final. However, as Djokovic was also defeated in the Dubai quarterfinals being played simultaneously, Medvedev ascended to world No. 1 for the first time. Medvedev thus became the first man outside of the Big Four to hold the top ranking since Andy Roddick in February 2004, and the third Russian man to achieve the ranking, following Yevgeny Kafelnikov in 1999 and Marat Safin in 2000.

At the Indian Wells Masters, Medvedev lost to Gaël Monfils in the third round. The loss resulted in his losing the No. 1 ranking, with Novak Djokovic once again taking the top spot. Medvedev had a chance to reclaim the No. 1 ranking the following fortnight if he reached the semifinals at the Miami Masters, but fell one match short, losing to defending champion Hubert Hurkacz in the quarterfinals.

On 2 April, Medvedev announced that he would miss the beginning of the clay court season to recover from a hernia procedure. On 20 April, the All England Club announced a ban on all Russian and Belarusian players, including Medvedev, from competing at the 2022 Wimbledon Championships due to the Russian invasion of Ukraine.

Following his recovery from surgery, Medvedev returned to play at the Geneva Open, where he lost his opening match to Richard Gasquet in straight sets. At the French Open, Medvedev was eliminated in the fourth round by Marin Čilić. However, as Novak Djokovic failed to defend his title, Medvedev reclaimed the No. 1 ranking.

Medvedev entered three tournaments in the grass court season, Rosmalen, Halle, and Mallorca. At his first event in Rosmalen, he reached the final without dropping a set before suffering a shock loss to world No. 205 Tim van Rijthoven. He then reached the final at Halle, once again without dropping a set, where he lost to Hubert Hurkacz. In Mallorca, Medvedev was defeated in the quarterfinals by Roberto Bautista Agut.

Medvedev started his North American summer hardcourt season by winning the title at the Los Cabos Open defeating Cameron Norrie in the final. In his opening round match against Rinky Hijikata, he recorded his 250th career singles match win. At the Canadian Open, Medvedev, who was the defending champion, lost his opening match to Nick Kyrgios. At the Cincinnati Masters, Medvedev was defeated by Stefanos Tsitsipas in the semifinals. Medvedev was yet again defeated by Kyrgios at the US Open, resulting in Medvedev losing the No. 1 ranking.

Medvedev began the fall indoor hardcourt season by competing at the Moselle Open, where he lost his opening match to Stan Wawrinka in three sets. Medvedev next competed at the Astana Open where he reached the semifinals. In his semifinal match, against Novak Djokovic, Medvedev was forced to retire with the match level at one-set-all with a leg injury. Medvedev returned to play at the Vienna Open where he defeated Denis Shapovalov in the final to win his second title of the year, and second ATP 500 title of his career. Medvedev finished the year on a four-match losing streak, losing in the opening round of the Paris Masters, and losing all three of his round-robin matches in the ATP Finals in third-set tiebreakers. This resulted in him dropping to world No. 7 in the year-end rankings.

=== 2023: Five titles and US Open finalist ===
Medvedev started the season at the Adelaide International where he reached the semifinals, losing to Novak Djokovic in straight sets. Seeded 7th at the Australian Open, he defeated Marcos Giron and John Millman before losing to Sebastian Korda in straight sets in the third round. As a result, Medvedev dropped out of the Top 10 to World No. 12.

In February, Medvedev entered the ABN AMRO Open in Rotterdam seeded 6th, where he made it to the finals whilst dropping only one set. In the final, he defeated Italian No. 1 Jannik Sinner in three sets, returning to the Top 10. The following week, Medvedev entered the Qatar ExxonMobil Open seeded third and won the tournament, defeating Andy Murray in straight sets in the final.

In March, Medvedev defeated No. 2 seed Andrey Rublev in straight sets in an all-Russian final to win in Dubai his third title in three weeks, and his 18th title overall thus winning titles in 18 different cities and becoming the first man in the Open Era to accomplish the feat. In this tournament, he did not drop a set including his win against No. 1 seed Novak Djokovic, snapping his 20-match winning streak. As a result, he moved back to world No. 6 on 6 March 2023.

At the next Masters 1000 tournament in Indian Wells, Medvedev reached back-to-back quarterfinals after defeating 12th seed Alexander Zverev in the fourth round. His victories against 23rd seed Alejandro Davidovich Fokina and 14th seed Frances Tiafoe propelled him into the final. In the final, he lost to Carlos Alcaraz in straight sets but re–entered the Top 5. In Miami, he reached back-to-back finals defeating 14th seed Karen Khachanov and won his 19th title in a 19th different city after defeating 10th seed Jannik Sinner in straight sets. He moved to world No. 4 in the rankings on 3 April 2023.

Medvedev began his clay court season at the Monte-Carlo Masters, where he reached his sixth consecutive quarterfinal with wins over Lorenzo Sonego and 13th seed Alexander Zverev but he lost to sixth seed Holger Rune in the quarterfinals, ending his streak of five consecutive finals. At the next Masters in Madrid he recorded his 300th win over first–time qualifier and compatriot Alexander Shevchenko in the third round. He lost to qualifier, another compatriot Aslan Karatsev in the fourth round. In Rome he reached the semifinals at a Masters 1000 clay-court event for just the second time (after Monte-Carlo 2019) defeating qualifier Yannick Hanfmann. Next, he defeated Stefanos Tsitsipas to reach his second final on clay. He won his first clay title defeating Holger Rune, having won 20 titles in 20 different cities. As a result, he returned to world No. 2 in the singles rankings on 22 May 2023. Medvedev entered the French Open as the second seed but lost in his first round match against Thiago Seyboth Wild.

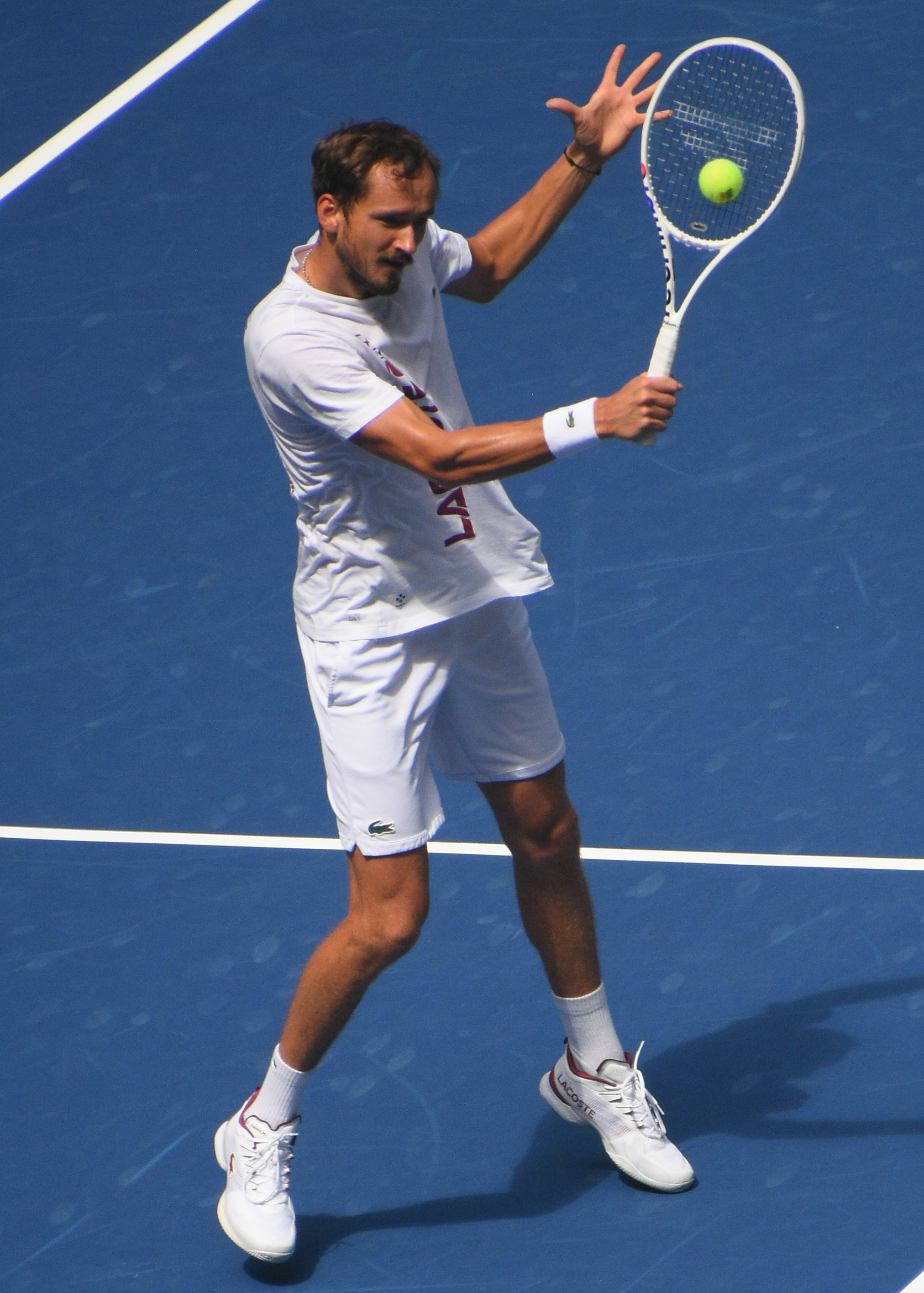
Medvedev at the 2023 US Open

Medvedev then competed at Wimbledon as the No. 3 seed and reached the semifinals for the first time at this major. Following wins over wildcard Arthur Fery, Adrian Mannarino, Márton Fucsovics, Jiří Lehečka, and Christopher Eubanks in a tight five set match, he set up a semifinal clash with eventual champion Carlos Alcaraz, losing in straight sets.

During the North American summer hardcourt swing, Medvedev reached the quarterfinals at the Canadian Open and the fourth round at the Cincinnati Masters, losing to Alex de Minaur and Alexander Zverev respectively. At the US Open, he reached the final following wins over Attila Bálazs, Christopher O'Connell, Sebastián Báez, Alex de Minaur, compatriot Andrey Rublev, and defending champion Carlos Alcaraz in the semifinals; Djokovic won the rematch of the 2021 final in straight sets. Following his US Open run, Medvedev became the third player to qualify for the 2023 ATP Finals.

During the Asian swing in October, Medvedev reached the final of the China Open where he lost to Jannik Sinner in straight sets. At the Rolex Shanghai Masters, he defeated Cristian Garín to record his 60th win of the year, becoming the second player of the season to accomplish this after Carlos Alcaraz. At the ATP Finals, he lost to Jannik Sinner in three sets in the semifinals. He finished his year with 67 wins, surpassing his previous best of 63 wins in 2021.

=== 2024: Australian final, 350th career win ===
Medvedev began his season at the Australian Open, where he defeated Emil Ruusuvuori in the second round from two sets down and recorded the third-latest match finish in the history of this major at 3:39 a.m. He then defeated Félix Auger-Aliassime and Nuno Borges to reach the quarterfinals. He then won back-to-back 5-set matches against Hubert Hurkacz and Alexander Zverev, coming back from two sets down to defeat the latter, to reach his third Australian Open final. He lost the final to Jannik Sinner in five sets, having led by two sets to love. It was his second loss in an Australian Open final after having led by two sets to love, following his loss in the 2022 Australian Open final to Rafael Nadal, becoming the only man in the Open Era to lose two Grand Slam finals from a two-set lead. By the end of the tournament, Medvedev had played four five-set matches in total and set two records: the most time spent on court at a Grand Slam tournament (24 hours and 17 minutes) and the most number of sets played in a singles major (31 sets).

At Indian Wells, Medvedev reached the final and lost to Carlos Alcaraz in a rematch of the previous year's final. At the Miami Open, he defeated Dominik Koepfer to reach the quarterfinals and recorded his 350th career win, becoming only the fourth man born in the 1990s or later to reach this milestone, after Dimitrov, Zverev and Raonic.

By reaching the quarterfinals at the Madrid Open the following month, he became the first player born in the 1990s or later to complete the career set of both Grand Slam and Masters 1000 quarterfinals and the tenth active player overall. As the defending champion at the Italian Open, Medvedev recorded his 100th Masters win over Jack Draper to reach the third round.

At the French Open, Medvedev defeated Dominik Koepfer in the first round, Miomir Kecmanović in the second round, and Tomáš Macháč in the third round. In the fourth round, he lost to Alex de Minaur in four sets.

At Wimbledon, he was seeded 5th and reached the semifinals, including a quarterfinal victory over World No. 1 Jannik Sinner in five sets. In the semifinals, he won the first set against defending champion and No. 3 seed Carlos Alcaraz before losing the next three sets.

At the National Bank Open and Cincinnati Open, he lost in the second rounds Alejandro Davidovich Fokina and Jiří Lehečka, respectively.

At the US Open in the quarterfinals, he lost in four sets to Jannik Sinner, who got his revenge for his previous loss against him, setting their head to head to 7–6.

At the Asian Swing, he reached the semifinals of Beijing and the quarterfinals of Shanghai respectively, losing to Alcaraz and Sinner.

After a second round defeat to Alexei Popyrin at Paris, he was eliminated in the round robin stage of the ATP Finals, winning his match against Alex de Minaur, but losing to Taylor Fritz and Sinner. He ended the year as No. 5, becoming the 3rd man to finish in the Top 5 of the year-end Rankings without winning a title during the season after Jimmy Connors in 1985 and 1987 and Federer in 2020.

=== 2025: First title in over two years ===
Medvedev started his season at the 2025 Australian Open where he overcame wildcard Kasidit Samrej in five sets despite being two sets-to-one down. He was then defeated by 19-year-old Learner Tien in five sets, losing two of three tiebreak sets.

He next participated in Rotterdam, beating Stan Wawrinka in three sets but losing in the second round to qualifier Mattia Bellucci.

At the 2025 Qatar ExxonMobil Open, Medvedev reached the quarterfinals, recording his 300th hardcourt win over Zizou Bergs, the second man born in 1990 or later to reach that milestone, after Grigor Dimitrov.

Medvedev then played in the first two Masters events of the year, the Indian Wells Open and Miami Open, losing to Holger Rune and Jaume Munar in the semifinals and second round, respectively. As he was not able to defend his last year's final and semifinal points, Medvedev dropped out of the Top 10 for the first time since 2023 to No. 11.

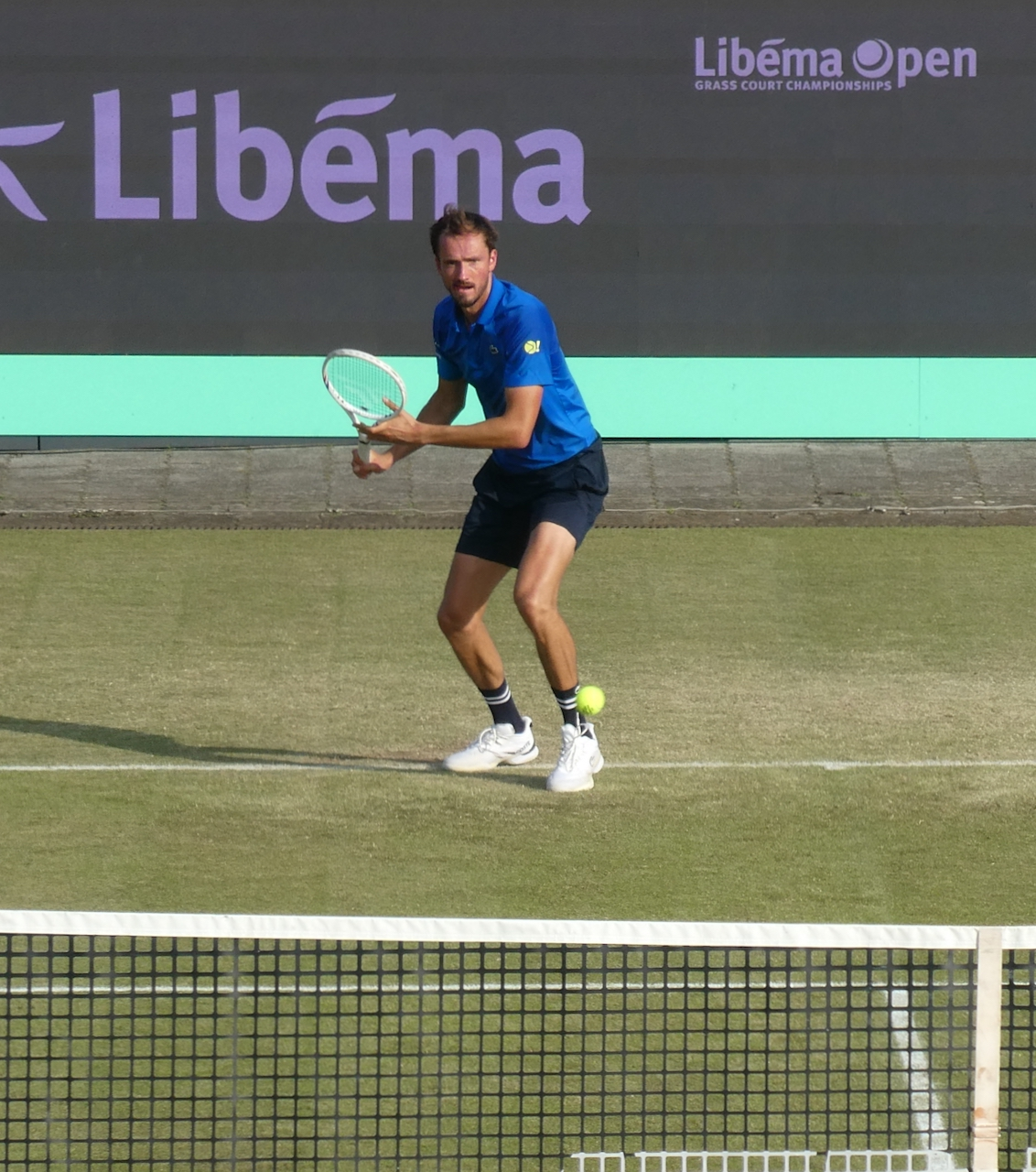
Medvedev at the 2025 Libéma Open

During the clay court season, Medvedev collected wins at the 2025 Monte-Carlo Masters over compatriot Karen Khachanov and Alexandre Muller, but lost in the third round to Alex de Minaur. He reached the quarterfinals at Madrid, losing to eventual champion Casper Ruud. He then lost in the fourth round to Lorenzo Musetti in Rome. However, perhaps the biggest shock was a first round loss to world No. 81 Cameron Norrie at the 2025 French Open. Nonetheless, he returned to the top 10 at No. 9.

At the grass court season, Medvedev reached his first ATP final since the 2024 Indian Wells tournament, in Halle, losing to Alexander Bublik and denying Medvedev a new title in over 2 years. At Wimbledon, Medvedev lost again in the first round of a Grand Slam, this time to Benjamin Bonzi. Having been unable to defend all of his semifinalist points last year, he dropped further in the rankings to No. 14.

In August at Cincinnati, Medvedev once again lost his opening match, this time to Adam Walton. Medvedev entered the US Open as the 13th seed and played in the opening round against unseeded Benjamin Bonzi losing again this time in five sets with a scoreline 3–6, 5–7, 7–6^{(7–5)}, 6–0, 4–6. The match was notably disrupted in the third set, with Bonzi serving between first and second serve on match point, when a photographer walked onto the court. Chair umpire Greg Allensworth allowed Bonzi to replay his first serve due to this interference. Medvedev protested the decision to the umpire, and provoked the crowd. The match was delayed for over six minutes before eventually resuming again. The photographer later had their credentials revoked by the United States Tennis Association (USTA). In the post-match press conference Medvedev clarified that he was not upset with the photographer's interruption but with the umpire's decision to award Bonzi another first serve. This marked Medvedev's worst performance at the majors since 2017, having only won one match throughout the entire year. Medvedev then announced his split with longtime coach, Gilles Cervara, and started working with former Australian Open champion Thomas Johansson and Rohan Goetzke as new coaches.

At the Almaty Open, under guidance by new coaches Johansson and Goetzke, Medvedev beat Corentin Moutet in the final in three sets to win his first title since the Rome 2023 Masters, ending a title drought of 882 days. It was his 21st ATP Tour title. However, he then lost to Moutet in Vienna a week later, in straight sets.

Medvedev then lost in the quarterfinals of the Paris Masters to Zverev (despite holding 2 match points) and thus failed to qualify for the ATP Finals for the first time since 2018. He ended the year at No. 13, his lowest ranking since 2018.

=== 2026: 4 titles, back to top 5 ===
Medvedev started his season in good form by winning the 2026 Brisbane title, beating Brandon Nakashima in the final in straight sets. This was his 22nd ATP Tour title in 22 cities.

At the Australian Open, Medvedev reached the fourth round with a notable five-set win over Fábián Marozsán in the third round after trailing two-sets-to-love down, but then lost to Learner Tien in a rematch of their last year's match, this time in straight sets, including a 0–6 second set (the first time Medvedev had been bagelled since Marseille 2020).

Medvedev then lost his opening match at the Rotterdam Open to Ugo Humbert in three sets, and lost to Stefanos Tsitsipas in the second round of Doha.

At the Dubai Championships, Medvedev claimed the title by walkover after opponent Tallon Griekspoor withdrew from the final due to injury. This marked the first time he had won the same tournament twice.

Medvedev's good form continued at the Indian Wells Open. He reached the final without dropping a set on route with wins over Alejandro Tabilo, Sebastián Báez, Alex Michelsen, defending champion Jack Draper and most notably world No. 1 Carlos Alcaraz. This was the first time Medvedev contested a Masters 1000 final since 2024, and as a result he returned to the top 10 for the first time since July. However, he was defeated by Jannik Sinner in two tight tiebreak-sets, despite opening the 2nd tie-break with a 4–0 lead.

At the Monte-Carlo Masters Medvedev lost his opening match against Matteo Berrettini by a double bagel (0–6, 0–6), the first time Medvedev had ever lost by that scoreline in a professional match. Medvedev only won 17 points throughout the entire match.

Medvedev then reached the semifinals of the Italian Open, where he lost to Sinner in three sets, but then suffered a shocking French Open first-round upset by Australian player Adam Walton, losing in five sets.

In September 2026, Medvedev entered the China Open as the third seed. He advanced to the semifinals after defeating Pablo Carreño Busta, Jan-Lennard Struff, and Francisco Cerúndolo all in straight sets. In his semifinal encounter against Novak Djokovic, down 7–5, 5–3 in the second set, Medvedev was defaulted after hitting a ball into the crowd which subsequently hit a spectator. Following the match, Medvedev commented on the incident: "I feel terribly sorry for him actually and I just hope he's okay. That's the most important. The rest, we move on. I just really care about him right now. Hopefully I can meet him and make up for it somehow." It was the first default in professional tennis since Denis Shapovalov at the 2024 Washington DC Open.

At the 2026 ATP Finals, Medvedev advanced to the semifinals after winning two of his three round robin matches, losing to Alcaraz but beating Flavio Cobolli and Tiafoe. He then lost to Alexander Zverev in the semifinals in straight sets, ending his season as world No. 5.

== Rivalries ==
=== Stefanos Tsitsipas ===
External videos
- Post-match encounter at the 2018 Miami Open on YouTube. Medvedev yelled to Tsitsipas: "Man, you better shut your fuck up, okay? Hey Stefanos, you wanna look at me and talk? You have some problems, you go emergency toilet for five minutes? ... And then you hit let and you don't say sorry, you think you are a good kid? Look at me! Hey, look at me, huh? You don't look at me? He started it. He started it. He started it. Yes, he started it. He said 'bullshit Russian', you think this is normal? I answer him because he doesn't know how to fight. He's a small kid who doesn't know how to fight. If he doesn't say anything, I have no problems with him. But if he says something to me and he wants to fight, he needs to do it. But he doesn't look at me after".

Daniil Medvedev and Stefanos Tsitsipas have faced each other 16 times since 2018, with Medvedev leading the rivalry, 11–5.

Medvedev and Tsitsipas first played each other in the first round of the 2018 Miami Open, when both were ranked outside of the top 50. Medvedev made a comeback after dropping the first set to win 6–2 in the third. The match is remembered for a verbal altercation after the players shook hands. Tsitsipas muttered "bullshit Russian" while the net, and Medvedev yelled at Tsitsipas from his bench, "Man, you better shut your fuck up, okay?" Medvedev complained that Tsitsipas had taken a long bathroom break (Medvedev also took one) and took issue with Tsitsipas not apologizing for hitting the net cord during a point. The chair umpire intervened and as Tsitsipas began to leave the court, Medvedev continued, "Look at me... He started it... He's a small kid who doesn't know how to fight".

In August 2018, after his victory over Tsitsipas at the US Open, Medvedev said, "We didn't speak after Miami ... but it's OK, I understand sometimes there are emotions on court. He blocked me on Instagram, it's strange, but even today he told me 'congrats'. There is no conflict between us, our parents are friends ... I think he wasn't right that time, and when I'm not right I apologize, but he didn't." After defeating Tsitsipas in Basel in October 2018, Medvedev posted a photo to his Instagram account with the caption, "Oops, I did it again".

Their relationship "thawed" over time and "kind of got better" after they were teammates at the 2021 Laver Cup.

At the 2022 Australian Open, No. 2 seed Medvedev and No. 4 seed Tsitsipas met in the semifinals. A rematch of their 2021 semifinal that Medvedev won in straight sets, both players received fines from the ATP due to their behaviour during the match. Medvedev was fined A$12,000 (US$9,022.56) for unsportsmanlike conduct toward chair umpire Jaume Campistol. During a changeover in the second set, after dropping his serve with a double fault, Medvedev yelled repeatedly at the umpire, "His father can talk every point? Bro, are you stupid? His father can talk every point?! ... Can his father talk every point?!" He later called Campistol a "small cat" for not citing his opponent for on-court coaching. Tsitsipas's father Apostolos, had received frequent warnings for coaching his son in Greek at matches. In the fourth set, Greek umpire Eva Asderaki-Moore was called in to monitor the situation. Tsitsipas failed to win another game after he was given a coaching warning and fined A$5,000 (US$3,759.4). Medvedev won 7–6^{(7–5)}, 4–6, 6–4, 6–1. After the match, Medvedev said "It all started in Miami" and "Every match against Stefanos is kind of special", though in another interview, he said that his outburst was about the coaching, and not something personal against his opponent.

=== Alexander Zverev ===
Medvedev and Zverev have faced each other 22 times with Medvedev leading the rivalry 14–8. Zverev won the first four matches of their rivalry, but Medvedev won twelve of the last fifteen of their encounters.

=== Jannik Sinner ===
Daniil Medvedev and Jannik Sinner have faced each other 17 times since 2020, with Sinner leading the rivalry 10–7. Medvedev won their first 6 matches, including the 2023 Miami Open final, but Sinner turned around the lopsided head to head in Beijing, beating Medvedev for the first time. Since then, Sinner has won 9 of their last 10 encounters, including their most notable match at the 2024 Australian Open final, which Sinner won to claim his first major title. Medvedev lost the final after leading 2 sets to love for the second time at the Australian Open; the 2022 final against Rafael Nadal had been Medvedev's first.

=== Nadal and Djokovic ===
Of his six major finals, Medvedev has twice faced Rafael Nadal (at the 2019 US Open and 2022 Australian Open) and thrice faced Novak Djokovic (at 2021 Australian Open, 2021 US Open, and 2023 US Open). His lone victory in major finals came at the 2021 US Open, where he defeated Djokovic in straight sets to win his first major title and deny Djokovic the Calendar Grand Slam. The following year, at the 2022 Australian Open, he was aiming to become the first man in the Open Era to win his second major title directly after the first, but lost to Nadal in an epic five-set match despite being two sets up.

Medvedev is 1–5 against Nadal and 5–11 against Djokovic.

== Playing style ==
Medvedev is known as a counterpuncher. Standing at 1.98 m (6 ft 6 in) tall, he has a very powerful first serve capable of reaching 148 mph (238 km/h). He hits long, flat groundstrokes, often wearing opponents down with lengthy baseline rallies. Medvedev's biggest weapon is consistency.

Medvedev is also known for his strong return of serve. He tends to adopt a very deep position at the back of the court which allows him to hit full-swing groundstrokes rather than blocking the serve back into play. He also possesses one of the best backhands on tour. His forehand is generally the weaker shot of the two. He is known for his defensive approach to play. Medvedev has been characterized as a relatively strong competitor mentally, evident in his attitude on the court, playing style, and demeanor in big matches. Since 2018, he has worked with performance coach Francisca Dauzet, who has said Medvedev has "monstrous mental potential" and is working to control his impatience.

Medvedev's preferred surface is hardcourt and he has been one of the best and most consistent players on the surface since he first broke through to the top 10 in 2019. He has shown to be highly antagonistic towards clay, where he struggles the most. Medvedev suffers on clay due to his style of playing flat strokes and the fact that his movement, one of his biggest strengths on a hardcourt, is hampered. Medvedev himself said that he dislikes clay because it makes surrounding areas dirty. In 2021, during a match against Alejandro Davidovich Fokina, Medvedev said, "I don't want to play here on this surface!" and "This surface is for losers." Over time, Medvedev managed to get more comfortable with clay and adjust to the surface. He has since achieved solid results on the surface including a Masters title at the 2023 Italian Open.

With his playing style, Novak Djokovic has described Medvedev as a very complete player and in October 2019 Alexander Zverev called him the best player in the world. 2019 ATP Finals champion, Stefanos Tsitsipas, once described his way of playing as "very boring"; but later said "he just plays extremely smart and outplays you".

Medvedev has sometimes had an antagonistic relationship with crowds. At the 2021 US Open (which he won) and 2022 Australian Open, Medvedev was frequently booed and antagonized by the home crowd. At the 2023 US Open, Medvedev lashed out at the crowd, asking if they were "stupid" and asking them to "shut up."

== Endorsements ==
Medvedev endorses Lacoste for apparel and shoes, Tecnifibre for racquets, and Bovet for watches. He also has been employed as an ambassador by BMW, Tinkoff Bank, and HyperX for gaming accessories, mostly for the Russian-speaking world. He previously endorsed Lotto for apparel and shoes until 2019. Since November 2021, he has been signed as a promoter of the Guojiao 1573 brand.

== Career statistics ==
=== Grand Slam performance timeline ===
Key
W	F	SF	QF	#R	RR	Q#	DNQ	A	NH

(W) winner; (F) finalist; (SF) semifinalist; (QF) quarterfinalist; (#R) rounds 4, 3, 2, 1; (RR) round-robin stage; (Q#) qualification round; (DNQ) did not qualify; (A) absent; (NH) not held; (SR) strike rate (events won / competed); (W–L) win–loss record.
To avoid confusion and double counting, these charts are updated at the conclusion of a tournament or when the player's participation has ended.

Current through the 2026 US Open.

Tournament	2016	2017	2018	2019	2020	2021	2022	2023	2024	2025	2026	SR	W–L	Win %
Australian Open	A	1R	2R	4R	4R	F	F	3R	F	2R	4R	0 / 10	31–10	76%
French Open	A	1R	1R	1R	1R	QF	4R	1R	4R	1R	1R	0 / 10	10–10	50%
Wimbledon	Q3	2R	3R	3R	NH	4R	A (Note: Russian athletes were banned from competing following the 2022 Russian invasion of Ukraine.)	SF	SF	1R	3R	0 / 8	20–8	71%
US Open	Q1	1R	3R	F	SF	W	4R	F	QF	1R	4R	1 / 10	36–9	80%
Win–loss	0–0	1–4	5–4	11–4	8–3	20–3	12–3	13–4	18–4	1–4	8–4	1 / 38	97–37	72%

=== Grand Slam tournament finals ===
==== Singles: 6 (1 title, 5 runner-ups) ====
Result	Year	Tournament	Surface	Opponent	Score
Loss	2019	US Open	Hard	(Spain) Rafael Nadal	5–7, 3–6, 7–5, 6–4, 4–6
Loss	2021	Australian Open	Hard	(Serbia) Novak Djokovic	5–7, 2–6, 2–6
Win	2021	US Open	Hard	(Serbia) Novak Djokovic	6–4, 6–4, 6–4
Loss	2022	Australian Open	Hard	(Spain) Rafael Nadal	6–2, 7–6^{(7–5)}, 4–6, 4–6, 5–7
Loss	2023	US Open	Hard	(Serbia) Novak Djokovic	3–6, 6–7^{(5–7)}, 3–6
Loss	2024	Australian Open	Hard	(Italy) Jannik Sinner	6–3, 6–3, 4–6, 4–6, 3–6

=== Year-end championship performance timeline ===
Tournament	2015	2016	2017	2018	2019	2020	2021	2022	2023	2024	2025	2026	SR	W–L	Win %
Year-end championships
ATP Finals	did not qualify				RR	W	F	RR	SF	RR	DNQ		1 / 6	12–11	52%

=== Year-end championship finals ===
==== Singles: 2 (1 title, 1 runner-up) ====
Result	Year	Tournament	Surface	Opponent	Score
Win	2020	ATP Finals	Hard (i)	(Austria) Dominic Thiem	4–6, 7–6^{(7–2)}, 6–4
Loss	2021	ATP Finals	Hard (i)	(Germany) Alexander Zverev	4–6, 4–6

=== Records ===
- These records were attained in the Open Era of tennis.

Tournament	Since	Record accomplished	Players matched
ATP Tour	2019	4 consecutive finals of the North American swing	Ivan Lendl; Andre Agassi
ATP Tour	2020	Defeated the world No. 1, 2, and 3 at a single tournament	Boris Becker; Novak Djokovic; David Nalbandian
ATP Tour	2021	Winner of the two premier team competitions (ATP Cup & Davis Cup) in a single season	Andrey Rublev; Félix Auger-Aliassime
ATP Tour	2026	First 22 titles in 22 different cities	Stands alone
Grand Slam tournaments	2021–2022	Reached the finals of the next consecutive major after winning first title	Andy Murray; Alexander Zverev
Grand Slam tournaments	2022, 2024	Losing two major finals from a two-set lead	Stands alone
Australian Open	2024	Most sets played in a Grand Slam (31)	Stands alone
Australian Open	2024	Most time spent on court in a Singles Grand Slam (24 hours, 17 minutes)	Stands alone

== Awards ==
External image
- Medvedev's parents, Sergey and Olga in 2019, receive the Russian Cup

National

- The Russian Cup in the nominations:
  - Male Tennis Player of the Year: 2019, 2021;
  - Team of the Year: 2019, 2021.
- Sports title "Merited Master of Sports of Russia" (2019)
