= 2022 Australian Open – Men's singles final =

Australian Open tennis final

2022 Australian Open Men's Final
- (Spain) Rafael Nadal vs. (Russia) Daniil Medvedev
Set	1	2	3	4	5
(Spain) Rafael Nadal	2	6^{5}	6	6	7
(Russia) Daniil Medvedev	6	7^{7}	4	4	5
- Date: 30 January 2022
- Tournament: Australian Open
- Location: Melbourne, Australia
- Chair umpire: John Blom
- Duration: 5 hours 24 minutes
- World rankings: (Spain) Rafael Nadal: 5 (Russia) Daniil Medvedev: 2

The 2022 Australian Open Men's Singles final was the championship tennis match of the men's singles tournament at the 2022 Australian Open, contested by sixth-seed Rafael Nadal and second-seed Daniil Medvedev. It was a match of historic proportions for both players: Nadal was attempting to surpass an all-time joint record of 20 major men's singles titles, shared with his great rivals, Novak Djokovic and Roger Federer, by winning a record 21st major title; and to become the fourth man to complete the double career Grand Slam (after Roy Emerson, Rod Laver, and Djokovic). Medvedev was seeking to become the first man in the Open Era to win his first two major titles at consecutive events (having won the preceding US Open title).

Nadal defeated Medvedev, 2–6, 6–7^{(5–7)}, 6–4, 6–4, 7–5, in 5 hours and 24 minutes to win his second Australian Open title, and a then all-time record 21st major men's singles title. This was at the time the second-longest major final in history after the 2012 Australian Open final, in which Nadal also participated. Nadal became the first player in the Open Era to win an Australian Open final after losing the first two sets, and the first to do so since Emerson in 1965. Nadal also set the record for the longest span between titles at the same Grand Slam tournament; he last won the tournament in 2009, a gap of 13 years. It also marked the third consecutive year a man trailed by two sets in a major final yet rallied to win, following Dominic Thiem's victory at the 2020 US Open and Djokovic's at the 2021 French Open, and only the seventh such occasion in the Open Era (preceded by five French Open finals and one US Open final).

The match was praised as one of the best of the 2022 season.

== Background ==
Nadal and Medvedev had met on four previous occasions, including in the 2019 US Open final where Nadal prevailed in five sets. Heading into the match, Nadal led their head-to-head 3–1. However, Medvedev entered the final with a 13-match win streak at the majors, having won the 2021 US Open final in straight sets against the world No. 1 Novak Djokovic. Medvedev's hardcourt record in the previous 12 months and Nadal's injury-ridden 2021 season, which included a six-month absence from competitive tennis, led to Medvedev being considered the favorite prior to the match.

== Match ==
The match began at 7:47 pm local time and ended at 1:11 am the following day.

Medvedev broke Nadal's serve twice to take the first set 6–2. In the second set, Nadal broke Medvedev's serve at 2–1 in a game featuring a 40 shot rally, and consolidated to take a 4–1 lead. Medvedev broke back at 4–2, but Nadal broke again in the next game to take a 5–3 lead and earn a chance to close the set out on his serve. Medvedev saved a set point with a backhand down the line that drew a Nadal backhand error, and was able to break back when Nadal pushed a forehand long. Both players would then hold their serve to send the set into a tiebreak at 6–6. In the tiebreak, Nadal held a mini-break advantage on two occasions and led 5–3, but could not hold on as Medvedev won four straight points to win the tiebreak 7–5 and take a two-set advantage. The second set lasted 84 minutes and was the longest set of the tournament.

In the third set, Nadal faced three break points at 2–3, 0–40. Nadal saved all three break points to hold and then broke Medvedev's serve at 4–4 with a backhand passing shot, a moment that was crucial to shifting the momentum of the match. He successfully held serve at 5–4 to claim the third set. In the fourth set, Nadal broke Medvedev's serve at 2–2 with a drop shot followed by a cross-court backhand passing shot. Nadal would close out the set 6–4 to send the match into a championship-deciding fifth set.

Nadal took a break lead in the fifth set at 2–2 with a running forehand down the line, and served for the championship at 5–4. From 30–0 up in the game, Nadal committed two unforced errors and a double fault to allow Medvedev to break back. However, Nadal broke right back at 5–5 after Medvedev committed a forehand unforced error. He served for the championship a second time at 6–5, and held the game at love to complete a comeback and win his second Australian Open after 13 years, as well as surpassing Novak Djokovic and Roger Federer to win a then-record 21st major men's singles title, winning the match 2–6, 6–7^{(5–7)}, 6–4, 6–4, 7–5.

=== Officials ===
Australian John Blom was the chair umpire throughout the match.

== Statistics ==
Category	Nadal	Medvedev
1st serve %	117 of 189 = 62%	126 of 182 = 69%
Aces	3	23
Double faults	5	5
Winners	69	76
Unforced errors	68	52
Winners − Unforced errors	+1	+24
Winning % on 1st serve	78 of 117 = 67%	89 of 126 = 71%
Winning % on 2nd serve	34 of 72 = 47%	23 of 56 = 41%
Receiving points won	65 of 182 = 36%	72 of 189 = 38%
Break point conversions	7 of 22 = 32%	6 of 22 = 27%
Net approaches	30 of 50 = 60%	28 of 50 = 56%
Total points won	182	189
Fastest serve	124 mph (200 km/h)	133 mph (214 km/h)
Average 1st serve speed	116 mph (187 km/h)	119 mph (192 km/h)
Average 2nd serve speed	99 mph (159 km/h)	90 mph (140 km/h)

_{Source}
