= 2021 Australian Open – Men's singles qualifying =

Men's singles qualifying
- 2021 Australian Open

Events
Singles	men	women		boys	girls
Doubles	men	women	mixed	boys	girls
WC Singles	men	women	quad
WC Doubles	men	women	quad
Legends	men	women	mixed

Qualification
Singles	men	women
- Australian Open

This article displays the qualifying draw for men's singles at the 2021 Australian Open.

For the first time in Grand Slam history, the qualifying tournament took place at Khalifa International Tennis and Squash Complex in Doha, Qatar, due to Australia's quarantine restrictions resulting from the ongoing COVID-19 pandemic. Only qualified players and players eligible for a 'Lucky loser' spot were then able to travel to Melbourne for the main draw of the 2021 Australian Open.

== Seeds ==
1. (France) Grégoire Barrère (qualifying competition)
2. (Bolivia) Hugo Dellien (qualifying competition; Lucky loser)
3. (Russia) Aslan Karatsev (qualified)
4. (United States) Denis Kudla (second round, withdrew due to positive COVID-19 test)
5. (Japan) Taro Daniel (qualifying competition; Lucky loser)
6. (Brazil) Thiago Seyboth Wild (first round)
7. (Bosnia and Herzegovina) Damir Džumhur (qualifying competition; Lucky loser)
8. (France) Antoine Hoang (second round)
9. (Russia) Evgeny Donskoy (first round)
10. (Argentina) Facundo Bagnis (first round)
11. (Germany) Cedrik-Marcel Stebe (qualifying competition; Lucky loser)
12. (India) Prajnesh Gunneswaran (second round)
13. (Italy) Lorenzo Musetti (first round)
14. (Slovakia) Jozef Kovalík (first round)
15. (Switzerland) Henri Laaksonen (qualified)
16. (Japan) Go Soeda (first round)
17. (Italy) Federico Gaio (first round)
18. (Serbia) Nikola Milojević (second round)
19. (Argentina) Francisco Cerúndolo (second round, withdrew due to positive Covid-19 test)
20. (Germany) Oscar Otte (first round)
21. (Spain) Carlos Alcaraz (qualified)
22. (Spain) Carlos Taberner (second round)
23. (Austria) Jurij Rodionov (first round)
24. (Serbia) Danilo Petrović (first round)
25. (Italy) Paolo Lorenzi (first round)
26. (Germany) Peter Gojowczyk (first round)
27. (Switzerland) Marc-Andrea Hüsler (second round)
28. (Spain) Bernabé Zapata Miralles (first round)
29. (Italy) Lorenzo Giustino (second round)
30. (Slovakia) Martin Kližan (first round)
31. (Egypt) Mohamed Safwat (second round)
32. (Slovenia) Blaž Rola (second round)

== Qualifiers ==
1. (Portugal) Frederico Ferreira Silva
2. (Spain) Carlos Alcaraz
3. (Russia) Aslan Karatsev
4. (Ukraine) Sergiy Stakhovsky
5. (Sweden) Elias Ymer
6. (France) Quentin Halys
7. (Belgium) Kimmer Coppejans
8. (United States) Michael Mmoh
9. (Czech Republic) Tomáš Macháč
10. (Spain) Mario Vilella Martínez
11. (Serbia) Viktor Troicki
12. (Russia) Roman Safiullin
13. (Netherlands) Botic van de Zandschulp
14. (Australia) Bernard Tomic
15. (Switzerland) Henri Laaksonen
16. (United States) Maxime Cressy

== Lucky losers ==
The lucky losers draw was made among the players who would be travelling to Australia into a 14-day quarantine period with the highest ranking losing in the qualifying competition: Hugo Dellien, Taro Daniel, Damir Džumhur, Cedrik-Marcel Stebe, Mikael Torpegaard, Robin Haase, Alexandre Müller and Borna Gojo. The LL order by order of rankings as of 4 January 2021 was Dellien, Daniel, Džumhur, Stebe, Torpegaard, Haase and Müller.

1. (Bolivia) Hugo Dellien
2. (Japan) Taro Daniel
3. (Bosnia and Herzegovina) Damir Džumhur
4. (Germany) Cedrik-Marcel Stebe
5. (Denmark) Mikael Torpegaard
6. (Netherlands) Robin Haase
7. (France) Alexandre Müller

== Draw ==
=== First qualifier ===
First round
1	(France) Grégoire Barrère	7^{7}	6
(Czech Republic) Zdeněk Kolář	6^{5}	3
(France) Maxime Janvier	6^{8}	7	6
(Czech Republic) Lukáš Rosol	7^{10}	5	1
(Slovakia) Lukáš Lacko	3	2
(Portugal) Frederico Ferreira Silva	6	6
(Italy) Matteo Viola	4	4
18	(Serbia) Nikola Milojević	6	6

Second round
1	(France) Grégoire Barrère	6	4	6
(France) Maxime Janvier	2	6	1
(Portugal) Frederico Ferreira Silva	2	6	6
18	(Serbia) Nikola Milojević	6	1	4

Qualifying competition
1	(France) Grégoire Barrère	3	4
(Portugal) Frederico Ferreira Silva	6	6

=== Second qualifier ===
First round
2	(Bolivia) Hugo Dellien	6	6
(Chile) Alejandro Tabilo	1	0
(Australia) Andrew Harris	6	5	6
(Belgium) Ruben Bemelmans	4	7	3
(Argentina) Facundo Mena	6	3	2
(Russia) Evgeny Karlovskiy	3	6	6
(Slovakia) Filip Horanský	7	1	4
21	(Spain) Carlos Alcaraz	5	6	6

Second round
2	(Bolivia) Hugo Dellien	6	7^{8}
(Australia) Andrew Harris	4	6^{6}
(Russia) Evgeny Karlovskiy	6^{1}	6^{4}
21	(Spain) Carlos Alcaraz	7^{7}	7^{7}

Qualifying competition
2	(Bolivia) Hugo Dellien	2	3
21	(Spain) Carlos Alcaraz	6	6

=== Third qualifier ===
First round
3	(Russia) Aslan Karatsev	6	6^{4}	6
(United States) Brandon Nakashima	2	7^{7}	2
(France) Hugo Gaston	6^{3}	6	3
(Australia) Max Purcell	7^{7}	4	6
(Germany) Rudolf Molleker	7^{10}	5	3
(Canada) Peter Polansky	6^{8}	7	6
(France) Alexandre Müller	6	6
17	(Italy) Federico Gaio	1	1

Second round
3	(Russia) Aslan Karatsev	6	6
(Australia) Max Purcell	1	2
(Canada) Peter Polansky	0	1
(France) Alexandre Müller	6	6

Qualifying competition
3	(Russia) Aslan Karatsev	6	6
(France) Alexandre Müller	2	1

=== Fourth qualifier ===
First round
4	(United States) Denis Kudla	6	6
(Morocco) Elliot Benchetrit	4	3
WC	(Australia) Dane Sweeny	7^{7}	2	6
(Romania) Marius Copil	6^{3}	6	3
WC	(Australia) Matthew Ebden	5	6	4
WC	(Australia) Jason Kubler	7	2	6
(Ukraine) Sergiy Stakhovsky	7^{7}	6
28	(Spain) Bernabé Zapata Miralles	6^{4}	4

Second round
4	(United States) Denis Kudla
WC	(Australia) Dane Sweeny	w/o
WC	(Australia) Jason Kubler	6^{4}	4
(Ukraine) Sergiy Stakhovsky	7^{7}	6

Qualifying competition
WC	(Australia) Dane Sweeny	6	3	1
(Ukraine) Sergiy Stakhovsky	2	6	6

=== Fifth qualifier ===
First round
5	(Japan) Taro Daniel	4	6	6
(Dominican Republic) Roberto Cid Subervi	6	2	1
(Argentina) Marco Trungelliti	6	4	4
(Germany) Maximilian Marterer	4	6	6
PR	(Australia) Blake Mott	4	3
(Sweden) Elias Ymer	6	6
WC	(Australia) Akira Santillan	3	6	3
27	(Switzerland) Marc-Andrea Hüsler	6	3	6

Second round
5	(Japan) Taro Daniel	6	6
(Germany) Maximilian Marterer	3	4
(Sweden) Elias Ymer	1	6	6
27	(Switzerland) Marc-Andrea Hüsler	6	3	2

Qualifying competition
5	(Japan) Taro Daniel	1	2
(Sweden) Elias Ymer	6	6

=== Sixth qualifier ===
First round
6	(Brazil) Thiago Seyboth Wild	6	4	6^{8}
(Netherlands) Robin Haase	3	6	7^{10}
(Italy) Gian Marco Moroni	4	6	6
WC	(Germany) Mischa Zverev	6	3	0
(France) Benjamin Bonzi	0	2
(France) Quentin Halys	6	6
(Turkey) Cem İlkel	6	6
26	(Germany) Peter Gojowczyk	2	3

Second round
(Netherlands) Robin Haase	6	7
(Italy) Gian Marco Moroni	4	5
(France) Quentin Halys	2	7^{7}	6
(Turkey) Cem İlkel	6	6^{2}	1

Qualifying competition
(Netherlands) Robin Haase	3	4
(France) Quentin Halys	6	6

=== Seventh qualifier ===
First round
7	(Bosnia and Herzegovina) Damir Džumhur	5	6	6
(Ecuador) Emilio Gómez	7	3	2
(Germany) Julian Lenz	1	6	6
(Argentina) Renzo Olivo	6	2	2
(Ukraine) Illya Marchenko	6^{2}	3
(Belgium) Kimmer Coppejans	7^{7}	6
PR	(Belgium) Arthur De Greef	2	4
31	(Egypt) Mohamed Safwat	6	6

Second round
7	(Bosnia and Herzegovina) Damir Džumhur	6	6
(Germany) Julian Lenz	2	2
(Belgium) Kimmer Coppejans	6	6
31	(Egypt) Mohamed Safwat	3	4

Qualifying competition
7	(Bosnia and Herzegovina) Damir Džumhur	2	0
(Belgium) Kimmer Coppejans	6	6

=== Eighth qualifier ===
First round
8	(France) Antoine Hoang	6	7
(Spain) Tommy Robredo	1	5
(France) Arthur Rinderknech	7^{7}	6
(Germany) Daniel Masur	6^{3}	3
(China) Li Zhe	4	6	6
(United States) Thai-Son Kwiatkowski	6	3	4
(United States) Michael Mmoh	6	6
24	(Serbia) Danilo Petrović	3	2

Second round
8	(France) Antoine Hoang	6^{2}	4
(France) Arthur Rinderknech	7^{7}	6
(China) Li Zhe	6	4	6^{7}
(United States) Michael Mmoh	2	6	7^{10}

Qualifying competition
(France) Arthur Rinderknech	3	6^{3}
(United States) Michael Mmoh	6	7^{7}

=== Ninth qualifier ===
First round
9	(Russia) Evgeny Donskoy	5	3
(China) Zhang Zhizhen	7	6
(Germany) Mats Moraing	1	0
(Denmark) Mikael Torpegaard	6	6
(Czech Republic) Tomáš Macháč	6	6
(Portugal) João Domingues	3	1
(Brazil) Felipe Meligeni Alves	6	6
30	(Slovakia) Martin Kližan	1	4

Second round
(China) Zhang Zhizhen	1	6	1
(Denmark) Mikael Torpegaard	6	4	6
(Czech Republic) Tomáš Macháč	6	7^{7}
(Brazil) Felipe Meligeni Alves	1	6^{4}

Qualifying competition
(Denmark) Mikael Torpegaard	2	1
(Czech Republic) Tomáš Macháč	6	6

=== Tenth qualifier ===
First round
10	(Argentina) Facundo Bagnis	6^{6}	5
(India) Ramkumar Ramanathan	7^{8}	7
(Chinese Taipei) Wu Tung-lin	6	6
(United Kingdom) Jay Clarke	2	4
(Italy) Alessandro Giannessi	1	3
(Spain) Mario Vilella Martínez	6	6
(Spain) Guillermo García López	2	4
19	(Argentina) Francisco Cerúndolo	6	6

Second round
(India) Ramkumar Ramanathan	3	2
(Chinese Taipei) Wu Tung-lin	6	6
(Spain) Mario Vilella Martínez	w/o
19	(Argentina) Francisco Cerúndolo

Qualifying competition
(Chinese Taipei) Wu Tung-lin	6	5	4
(Spain) Mario Vilella Martínez	4	7	6

=== Eleventh qualifier ===
First round
11	(Germany) Cedrik-Marcel Stebe	6	4	7^{10}
(Italy) Thomas Fabbiano	1	6	6^{3}
WC	(Australia) Rinky Hijikata	6	6
(United States) Christopher Eubanks	2	3
PR	(Russia) Andrey Kuznetsov	4	1
(United States) Ulises Blanch	6	6
(Serbia) Viktor Troicki	2	6	6
23	(Austria) Jurij Rodionov	6	2	1

Second round
11	(Germany) Cedrik-Marcel Stebe	6	6
WC	(Australia) Rinky Hijikata	4	2
(United States) Ulises Blanch	5	3
(Serbia) Viktor Troicki	7	6

Qualifying competition
11	(Germany) Cedrik-Marcel Stebe	4	2
(Serbia) Viktor Troicki	6	6

=== Twelfth qualifier ===
First round
12	(India) Prajnesh Gunneswaran	6	4	6
(Canada) Brayden Schnur	4	6	2
(United Kingdom) Liam Broady	6^{1}	2
(France) Constant Lestienne	7^{7}	6
(United States) Mitchell Krueger	3	6	6
(France) Enzo Couacaud	6	2	2
(Russia) Roman Safiullin	7^{8}	6
20	(Germany) Oscar Otte	6^{6}	4

Second round
12	(India) Prajnesh Gunneswaran	2	3
(France) Constant Lestienne	6	6
(United States) Mitchell Krueger	1	4
(Russia) Roman Safiullin	6	6

Qualifying competition
(France) Constant Lestienne	7^{7}	3	4
(Russia) Roman Safiullin	6^{2}	6	6

=== Thirteenth qualifier ===
First round
13	(Italy) Lorenzo Musetti	6	1	4
(Netherlands) Botic van de Zandschulp	3	6	6
(Brazil) João Menezes	1	7^{10}	6
(Argentina) Andrea Collarini	6	6^{8}	3
(France) Mathias Bourgue	7^{7}	6
(United States) Ernesto Escobedo	6^{5}	2
(Latvia) Ernests Gulbis	6^{2}	3
32	(Slovenia) Blaž Rola	7^{7}	6

Second round
(Netherlands) Botic van de Zandschulp	6	6^{1}	6
(Brazil) João Menezes	3	7^{7}	4
(France) Mathias Bourgue	6	6^{4}	6
32	(Slovenia) Blaž Rola	2	7^{7}	3

Qualifying competition
(Netherlands) Botic van de Zandschulp	7^{7}	6
(France) Mathias Bourgue	6^{4}	4

=== Fourteenth qualifier ===
First round
14	(Slovakia) Jozef Kovalík	4	6	4
(Australia) Bernard Tomic	6	3	6
(Argentina) Guido Andreozzi	6^{1}	4
WC	(Australia) Tristan Schoolkate	7^{7}	6
WC	(Australia) Harry Bourchier	6^{6}	3
(Netherlands) Tallon Griekspoor	7^{8}	6
WC	(Australia) John-Patrick Smith	7	6
25	(Italy) Paolo Lorenzi	5	1

Second round
(Australia) Bernard Tomic	6	1	7^{10}
WC	(Australia) Tristan Schoolkate	4	6	6^{3}
(Netherlands) Tallon Griekspoor	6	3	4
WC	(Australia) John-Patrick Smith	2	6	6

Qualifying competition
(Australia) Bernard Tomic	6	5	7^{10}
WC	(Australia) John-Patrick Smith	4	7	6^{7}

=== Fifteenth qualifier ===
First round
15	(Switzerland) Henri Laaksonen	7	6
(Germany) Tobias Kamke	5	3
(Russia) Alexey Vatutin	3	6	4
(Canada) Steven Diez	6	4	6
(Croatia) Borna Gojo	6	6
(Austria) Sebastian Ofner	3	2
(Uzbekistan) Denis Istomin	1	1
29	(Italy) Lorenzo Giustino	6	6

Second round
15	(Switzerland) Henri Laaksonen	3	6	6
(Canada) Steven Diez	6	4	2
(Croatia) Borna Gojo	6	7^{9}
29	(Italy) Lorenzo Giustino	3	6^{7}

Qualifying competition
15	(Switzerland) Henri Laaksonen	6^{4}	6	7^{10}
(Croatia) Borna Gojo	7^{7}	4	6^{7}

=== Sixteenth qualifier ===
First round
16	(Japan) Go Soeda	7^{7}	4	5
(United States) Maxime Cressy	6^{3}	6	7
(Japan) Tatsuma Ito	4	2
(Germany) Yannick Maden	6	6
(Japan) Hiroki Moriya	2	6	1
PR	(Germany) Dustin Brown	6	2	6
(Italy) Roberto Marcora	2	5
22	(Spain) Carlos Taberner	6	7

Second round
(United States) Maxime Cressy	2	6	6
(Germany) Yannick Maden	6	3	4
PR	(Germany) Dustin Brown	6	7
22	(Spain) Carlos Taberner	3	5

Qualifying competition
(United States) Maxime Cressy	7^{7}	6
PR	(Germany) Dustin Brown	6^{5}	4
