= 2021 Australian Open – Women's singles qualifying =

Women's singles qualifying
- 2021 Australian Open

Events
Singles	men	women		boys	girls
Doubles	men	women	mixed	boys	girls
WC Singles	men	women	quad
WC Doubles	men	women	quad
Legends	men	women	mixed

Qualification
Singles	men	women
- Australian Open

This article displays the qualifying draw for women's singles at the 2021 Australian Open.

For the first time in Grand Slam history, the qualifying tournament will take place at Aviation Club Tennis Centre in Dubai, United Arab Emirates, due to Australia's quarantine restrictions resulting from the ongoing COVID-19 pandemic. Only qualified players and players eligible for a 'Lucky loser' spot will then be able to travel to Melbourne for the main draw of the 2021 Australian Open.

== Seeds ==
1. (Slovenia) Kaja Juvan (qualified)
2. (France) Océane Dodin (first round)
3. (Belgium) Greet Minnen (qualified)
4. (Germany) Anna-Lena Friedsam (first round)
5. (Poland) Katarzyna Kawa (first round)
6. (Russia) Anna Kalinskaya (second round)
7. (Hungary) Tímea Babos (qualified)
8. (Switzerland) Stefanie Vögele (first round)
9. (Ukraine) Katarina Zavatska (second round)
10. (Romania) Irina Bara (first round)
11. (Czech Republic) Tereza Martincová (second round)
12. (United States) Caty McNally (second round)
13. (Belgium) Ysaline Bonaventure (qualifying competition, lucky loser)
14. (Russia) Margarita Gasparyan (qualifying competition, lucky loser)
15. (Russia) Liudmila Samsonova (qualified)
16. (Egypt) Mayar Sherif (qualified)
17. (Italy) Sara Errani (qualified)
18. (Italy) Elisabetta Cocciaretto (qualified)
19. (Belarus) Olga Govortsova (first round)
20. (Slovakia) Anna Karolína Schmiedlová (qualifying competition, lucky loser)
21. (Bulgaria) Tsvetana Pironkova (qualified)
22. (Romania) Mihaela Buzărnescu (qualifying competition, lucky loser)
23. (Switzerland) Viktorija Golubic (second round)
24. (Bulgaria) Viktoriya Tomova (second round)
25. (Canada) Eugenie Bouchard (second round)
26. (Mexico) Renata Zarazúa (second round)
27. (United States) Francesca Di Lorenzo (first round)
28. (Romania) Monica Niculescu (first round)
29. (Russia) Natalia Vikhlyantseva (first round)
30. (Ukraine) Lesia Tsurenko (qualifying competition)
31. (Slovakia) Kristína Kučová (first round)
32. (Austria) Barbara Haas (first round)

== Qualifiers ==
1. (Slovenia) Kaja Juvan
2. (United Kingdom) Francesca Jones
3. (Belgium) Greet Minnen
4. (Italy) Sara Errani
5. (United States) Whitney Osuigwe
6. (France) Clara Burel
7. (Hungary) Tímea Babos
8. (Japan) Mayo Hibi
9. (Serbia) Olga Danilović
10. (France) Chloé Paquet
11. (Canada) Rebecca Marino
12. (Italy) Elisabetta Cocciaretto
13. (Russia) Valeria Savinykh
14. (Bulgaria) Tsvetana Pironkova
15. (Russia) Liudmila Samsonova
16. (Egypt) Mayar Sherif

== Lucky losers ==
The lucky losers draw was made among the players who would be travelling to Australia into a 14-day quarantine period with the highest ranking losing in the qualifying competition: Ysaline Bonaventure, Mihaela Buzărnescu, Margarita Gasparyan, Anna Karolína Schmiedlová, Lesia Tsurenko, Kamilla Rakhimova, Ankita Raina and Varvara Lepchenko. The LL order by order of rankings as of 4 January 2021 was Bonaventure, Buzărnescu, Gasparyan and Schmiedlová.

1. (Belgium) Ysaline Bonaventure
2. (Romania) Mihaela Buzărnescu
3. (Russia) Margarita Gasparyan
4. (Slovakia) Anna Karolína Schmiedlová

== Draw ==
Key

- Q = Qualifier
- WC = Wild card
- LL = Lucky loser
- Alt = Alternate
- ITF = ITF entry
- PR = Protected ranking
- SR = Special ranking
- SE = Special exempt
- JE = Junior exempt
- JR = Junior Accelerator Programme entrant
- CO = College Accelerator Programme entrant
- NG = Next Gen Accelerator Program entrant
- w/o = Walkover
- r = Retired
- d = Defaulted

=== First qualifier ===
First round
1	(Slovenia) Kaja Juvan	7^{7}	6
WC	(Australia) Storm Sanders	6^{4}	2
(Ukraine) Anhelina Kalinina	6	6
(Turkey) Pemra Özgen	1	1
(Slovakia) Rebecca Šramková	6	6
(Slovenia) Dalila Jakupović	1	3
(Russia) Anastasiya Komardina	3	4
26	(Mexico) Renata Zarazúa	6	6

Second round
1	(Slovenia) Kaja Juvan	6	6
(Ukraine) Anhelina Kalinina	2	4
(Slovakia) Rebecca Šramková	6	4	6
26	(Mexico) Renata Zarazúa	4	6	3

Qualifying competition
1	(Slovenia) Kaja Juvan	6	6
(Slovakia) Rebecca Šramková	1	2

=== Second qualifier ===
First round
2	(France) Océane Dodin	5	2
(Bulgaria) Isabella Shinikova	7	6
(China) Lu Jiajing	6	6
(Serbia) Jovana Jović	1	2
(Georgia (country)) Ekaterine Gorgodze	3	3
(Croatia) Jana Fett	6	6
(United Kingdom) Francesca Jones	6	6
28	(Romania) Monica Niculescu	3	2

Second round
(Bulgaria) Isabella Shinikova	2	5
(China) Lu Jiajing	6	7
(Croatia) Jana Fett	6^{7}	6	1
(United Kingdom) Francesca Jones	7^{9}	2	6

Qualifying competition
(China) Lu Jiajing	0	1
(United Kingdom) Francesca Jones	6	6

=== Third qualifier ===
First round
3	(Belgium) Greet Minnen	6	6
WC	(Australia) Alexandra Bozovic	3	4
(Paraguay) Verónica Cepede Royg	6	6
(United States) Asia Muhammad	3	4
(United States) Caroline Dolehide	3	7	5
(Australia) Ellen Perez	6	5	7
(United States) Varvara Lepchenko	3	6	6
27	(United States) Francesca Di Lorenzo	6	2	0

Second round
3	(Belgium) Greet Minnen	7	6
(Paraguay) Verónica Cepede Royg	5	3
(Australia) Ellen Perez	4	6	3
(United States) Varvara Lepchenko	6	2	6

Qualifying competition
3	(Belgium) Greet Minnen	6	3	6
(United States) Varvara Lepchenko	2	6	4

=== Fourth qualifier ===
First round
4	(Germany) Anna-Lena Friedsam	2	7^{7}	4
WC	(Croatia) Ana Konjuh	6	6^{5}	6
(Turkey) Çağla Büyükakçay	6	6
WC	(Andorra) Victoria Jiménez Kasintseva	4	4
(Russia) Anastasia Zakharova	0	0
(Spain) Georgina García Pérez	6	6
(Chinese Taipei) Liang En-shuo	1	7	2
17	(Italy) Sara Errani	6	5	6

Second round
WC	(Croatia) Ana Konjuh	6	6
(Turkey) Çağla Büyükakçay	4	2
(Spain) Georgina García Pérez	6	3	2
17	(Italy) Sara Errani	3	6	6

Qualifying competition
WC	(Croatia) Ana Konjuh	6	2	4
17	(Italy) Sara Errani	3	6	6

=== Fifth qualifier ===
First round
5	(Poland) Katarzyna Kawa	4	3
(United States) Whitney Osuigwe	6	6
(Belgium) Lara Salden	6	5	3
WC	(Australia) Olivia Gadecki	2	7	6
(United States) Claire Liu	7^{7}	6
(Netherlands) Indy de Vroome	6^{5}	2
(Spain) Lara Arruabarrena	4	3
22	(Romania) Mihaela Buzărnescu	6	6

Second round
(United States) Whitney Osuigwe	6	6
WC	(Australia) Olivia Gadecki	2	4
(United States) Claire Liu	6^{6}	6	4
22	(Romania) Mihaela Buzărnescu	7^{8}	2	6

Qualifying competition
(United States) Whitney Osuigwe	2	7^{7}	6
22	(Romania) Mihaela Buzărnescu	6	6^{1}	2

=== Sixth qualifier ===
First round
6	(Russia) Anna Kalinskaya	6	6^{5}	6
(Hungary) Dalma Gálfi	4	7^{7}	3
(France) Clara Burel	6	6
(Spain) Eva Guerrero Álvarez	4	0
(Russia) Victoria Kan	6^{2}	2
(United States) Hailey Baptiste	7^{7}	6
(Colombia) Camila Osorio	6	3	7
32	(Austria) Barbara Haas	3	6	5

Second round
6	(Russia) Anna Kalinskaya	3	6	4
(France) Clara Burel	6	3	6
(United States) Hailey Baptiste	6^{4}	6^{3}
(Colombia) Camila Osorio	7^{7}	7^{7}

Qualifying competition
(France) Clara Burel	6	6
(Colombia) Camila Osorio	4	3

=== Seventh qualifier ===
First round
7	(Hungary) Tímea Babos	6	6
(Russia) Marina Melnikova	3	3
(France) Tessah Andrianjafitrimo	6	6
PR	(United Kingdom) Naiktha Bains	1	2
(Japan) Chihiro Muramatsu	6	7^{7}
(Spain) Nuria Párrizas Díaz	2	6^{5}
(United States) Usue Maitane Arconada	7^{7}	2	6^{5}
20	(Slovakia) Anna Karolína Schmiedlová	6^{2}	6	7^{10}

Second round
7	(Hungary) Tímea Babos	6	2	6
(France) Tessah Andrianjafitrimo	3	6	2
(Japan) Chihiro Muramatsu	4	3
20	(Slovakia) Anna Karolína Schmiedlová	6	6

Qualifying competition
7	(Hungary) Tímea Babos	6	6^{5}	6
20	(Slovakia) Anna Karolína Schmiedlová	2	7^{7}	2

=== Eighth qualifier ===
First round
8	(Switzerland) Stefanie Vögele	3	4
(Germany) Katharina Gerlach	6	6
(Japan) Mayo Hibi	6	6
(China) You Xiaodi	4	2
(China) Wang Xinyu	2	6^{1}
(Russia) Kamilla Rakhimova	6	7^{7}
(Netherlands) Richèl Hogenkamp	3	7^{8}	3
23	(Switzerland) Viktorija Golubic	6	6^{6}	6

Second round
(Germany) Katharina Gerlach	3	4
(Japan) Mayo Hibi	6	6
(Russia) Kamilla Rakhimova	6	6
23	(Switzerland) Viktorija Golubic	2	3

Qualifying competition
(Japan) Mayo Hibi	6	6
(Russia) Kamilla Rakhimova	4	4

=== Ninth qualifier ===
First round
9	(Ukraine) Katarina Zavatska	6	6
(Denmark) Clara Tauson	3	3
(Hungary) Réka Luca Jani	2	2
(India) Ankita Raina	6	6
(Spain) Cristina Bucșa	1	6	2
(United States) Sachia Vickery	6	3	6
(Serbia) Olga Danilović	6	6
31	(Slovakia) Kristína Kučová	2	2

Second round
9	(Ukraine) Katarina Zavatska	2	6	3
(India) Ankita Raina	6	2	6
(United States) Sachia Vickery	4	1
(Serbia) Olga Danilović	6	6

Qualifying competition
(India) Ankita Raina	2	6	1
(Serbia) Olga Danilović	6	3	6

=== Tenth qualifier ===
First round
10	(Romania) Irina Bara	6^{5}	2
(Japan) Yuki Naito	7^{7}	6
(France) Chloé Paquet	6	6
(Romania) Gabriela Talabă	4	2
(China) Yuan Yue	6	6
(Poland) Maja Chwalińska	4	2
WC	(Australia) Abbie Myers	2	3
25	(Canada) Eugenie Bouchard	6	6

Second round
(Japan) Yuki Naito	6^{3}	2
(France) Chloé Paquet	7^{7}	6
(China) Yuan Yue	6	6
25	(Canada) Eugenie Bouchard	2	4

Qualifying competition
(France) Chloé Paquet	7^{7}	6
(China) Yuan Yue	6^{3}	3

=== Eleventh qualifier ===
First round
11	(Czech Republic) Tereza Martincová	6	6
(Croatia) Tereza Mrdeža	1	2
(Belgium) Maryna Zanevska	6	6
(Romania) Laura Ioana Paar	3	2
PR	(Canada) Rebecca Marino	6	6
(Romania) Jaqueline Cristian	4	4
WC	(Australia) Charlotte Kempenaers-Pocz	4	3
24	(Bulgaria) Viktoriya Tomova	6	6

Second round
11	(Czech Republic) Tereza Martincová	2	3
(Belgium) Maryna Zanevska	6	6
PR	(Canada) Rebecca Marino	6	7^{9}
24	(Bulgaria) Viktoriya Tomova	2	6^{7}

Qualifying competition
(Belgium) Maryna Zanevska	4	6^{9}
PR	(Canada) Rebecca Marino	6	7^{11}

=== Twelfth qualifier ===
First round
12	(United States) Caty McNally	6	6
(Ukraine) Daria Snigur	4	1
(France) Harmony Tan	7^{7}	6
(United States) Allie Kiick	6^{4}	1
WC	(Australia) Seone Mendez	0	2
(Belgium) Marie Benoît	6	6
(Brazil) Gabriela Cé	3	1
18	(Italy) Elisabetta Cocciaretto	6	6

Second round
12	(United States) Caty McNally	1	4
(France) Harmony Tan	6	6
(Belgium) Marie Benoît	4	6^{2}
18	(Italy) Elisabetta Cocciaretto	6	7^{7}

Qualifying competition
(France) Harmony Tan	3	1
18	(Italy) Elisabetta Cocciaretto	6	6

=== Thirteenth qualifier ===
First round
13	(Belgium) Ysaline Bonaventure	6	6
(Serbia) Natalija Kostić	3	3
(Germany) Antonia Lottner	6	7
(Bulgaria) Elitsa Kostova	4	5
(Italy) Giulia Gatto-Monticone	6	6
(Russia) Valentina Ivakhnenko	2	3
(Russia) Valeria Savinykh	6	6
29	(Russia) Natalia Vikhlyantseva	2	4

Second round
13	(Belgium) Ysaline Bonaventure	6	6
(Germany) Antonia Lottner	1	3
(Italy) Giulia Gatto-Monticone	4	6^{8}
(Russia) Valeria Savinykh	6	7^{10}

Qualifying competition
13	(Belgium) Ysaline Bonaventure	4	5
(Russia) Valeria Savinykh	6	7

=== Fourteenth qualifier ===
First round
14	(Russia) Margarita Gasparyan	6	4	6
(Italy) Martina Di Giuseppe	3	6	2
PR	(India) Karman Thandi	6^{4}	6^{4}
(Georgia (country)) Mariam Bolkvadze	7^{7}	7^{7}
(South Korea) Han Na-lae	3	6	6
(Austria) Julia Grabher	6	3	1
(Japan) Kyōka Okamura	0	1
21	(Bulgaria) Tsvetana Pironkova	6	6

Second round
14	(Russia) Margarita Gasparyan	6	7^{7}
(Georgia (country)) Mariam Bolkvadze	3	6^{3}
(South Korea) Han Na-lae	0	6	1
21	(Bulgaria) Tsvetana Pironkova	6	3	6

Qualifying competition
14	(Russia) Margarita Gasparyan	3	5
21	(Bulgaria) Tsvetana Pironkova	6	7

=== Fifteenth qualifier ===
First round
15	(Russia) Liudmila Samsonova	6	5	6
(Switzerland) Leonie Küng	0	7	2
(United States) Robin Anderson	4	6	7
(United States) Danielle Lao	6	3	5
(Japan) Kurumi Nara	4	4
(Netherlands) Lesley Pattinama Kerkhove	6	6
WC	(Australia) Ivana Popovic	6	2	2
30	(Ukraine) Lesia Tsurenko	2	6	6

Second round
15	(Russia) Liudmila Samsonova	6	6^{2}	6
(United States) Robin Anderson	0	7^{7}	3
(Netherlands) Lesley Pattinama Kerkhove	3	2
30	(Ukraine) Lesia Tsurenko	6	6

Qualifying competition
15	(Russia) Liudmila Samsonova	7^{7}	6
30	(Ukraine) Lesia Tsurenko	6^{1}	2

=== Sixteenth qualifier ===
First round
16	(Egypt) Mayar Sherif	6	6
PR	(Japan) Akiko Omae	0	1
(United States) Grace Min	7	6
(United Kingdom) Harriet Dart	5	2
(Chile) Daniela Seguel	6	7^{8}
(Netherlands) Bibiane Schoofs	3	6^{6}
(Serbia) Aleksandra Krunić	2	6	6
19	(Belarus) Olga Govortsova	6	2	2

Second round
16	(Egypt) Mayar Sherif	6	2	6
(United States) Grace Min	3	6	1
(Chile) Daniela Seguel	2	6	2
(Serbia) Aleksandra Krunić	6	2	6

Qualifying competition
16	(Egypt) Mayar Sherif	6	6
(Serbia) Aleksandra Krunić	1	2
