= Shingo Kunieda =

Japanese wheelchair tennis player

Shingo Kunieda 国枝 慎吾
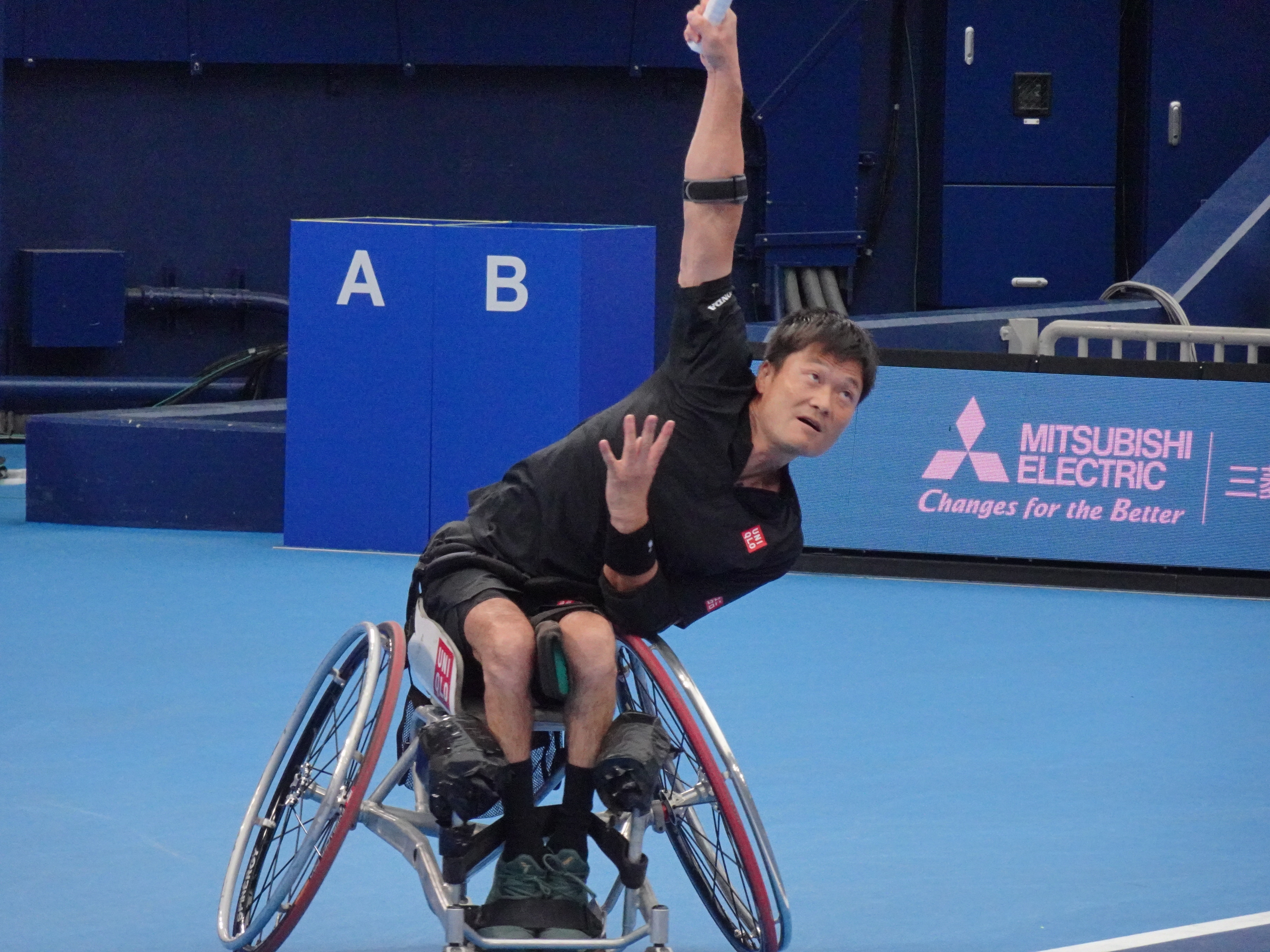
- Kunieda at 100th All Japan Tennis Championships in Tokyo, Japan, 2025
- Country (sports): Japan
- Residence: Chiba, Japan
- Born: February 21, 1984 (age 42) Tokyo, Japan
- Plays: Right-handed

Singles
- Career record: 493–62 (88.89%)
- Career titles: 50
- Highest ranking: No. 1 (9 October 2006)

Grand Slam singles results
- Australian Open: W (2007, 2008, 2009, 2010, 2011, 2013, 2014, 2015, 2018, 2020, 2022)
- French Open: W (2007, 2008, 2009, 2010, 2014, 2015, 2018, 2022)
- Wimbledon: W (2022)
- US Open: W (2007, 2009, 2010, 2011, 2014, 2015, 2020, 2021)

Other tournaments
- Masters: W (2012, 2013, 2014)
- Paralympic Games: Gold Medal (2008, 2012, 2020)

Doubles
- Career record: 340–82
- Career titles: 51
- Highest ranking: No. 1 (21 May 2007)

Grand Slam doubles results
- Australian Open: W (2007, 2008, 2009, 2010, 2011, 2013, 2014, 2015)
- French Open: W (2008, 2010, 2011, 2012, 2013, 2015, 2016, 2019)
- Wimbledon: W (2006, 2013, 2014, 2022)
- US Open: W (2007, 2014)

Other doubles tournaments
- Masters Doubles: W (2012)
- Paralympic Games: Gold Medal (2004)

Team competitions
- World Team Cup: 2003, 2007
Medal record
Men's wheelchair tennis
Representing Japan
Paralympic Games
Gold medal – first place	2004 Athens	Men's doubles
Gold medal – first place	2008 Beijing	Men's singles
Gold medal – first place	2012 London	Men's singles
Gold medal – first place	2020 Tokyo	Men's singles
Bronze medal – third place	2008 Beijing	Men's doubles
Bronze medal – third place	2016 Rio	Men's doubles
FESPIC Games
Gold medal – first place	2002 Busan	Doubles
Gold medal – first place	2006 Kuala Lumpur	Singles
Bronze medal – third place	2006 Kuala Lumpur	Doubles
Bronze medal – third place	2006 Kuala Lumpur	Team
Asian Para Games
Gold medal – first place	2010 Guangzhou	Singles
Gold medal – first place	2010 Guangzhou	Doubles
Gold medal – first place	2014 Incheon	Singles
Gold medal – first place	2014 Incheon	Doubles

Shingo Kunieda (国枝 慎吾, Kunieda Shingo; born February 21, 1984) is a Japanese former wheelchair tennis player. With four Paralympic gold medals, 28 major singles titles – an all-time record in singles of any tennis discipline – and 50 major titles overall, Kunieda is widely considered the greatest male wheelchair player of all time.

Kunieda was the ITF World Champion from 2007 to 2010. He was also the year-end No. 1 in doubles in 2007. In 2007, 2009, 2010, 2014, and 2015, Kunieda won all three singles majors that hosted wheelchair singles events (Wimbledon did not do so until 2016). In 2007 and 2008, Kunieda also won three of the four Masters series events. Kunieda is the only male player to retain the men's singles title at the Paralympics – he took the gold medal in 2008, 2012 and 2020. In addition, Kunieda won the gold medal in the 2004 men's doubles, and has been part of two World Team Cup wins. He has 103 career titles over singles and doubles combined, including 50 majors.

Kunieda had a three-year, 106-match consecutive win streak. The streak began after his loss at the 2007 Masters and ended to Stéphane Houdet in the semifinals of the 2010 Masters. In late 2012 to early 2013, Kunieda had a win streak of 44 matches. Between January 2014 and December 2015, Kunieda was on yet another winning streak of 77 matches, ending to Joachim Gérard in the round-robin phase of the 2015 NEC Masters tournament.

Kunieda is a right-handed player whose favorite surface is hard court. He was coached by Hiromichi Maruyama. He announced his retirement in January 2023. In November 2026, it was announced that Kunieda would be inducted into the International Tennis Hall of Fame in August 2027.

== Biography ==
Due to a tumor in his spinal cord found when he was 9, he is paralyzed in the lower half of his body. Kunieda uses an Ox Engineering wheelchair. He graduated from Reitaku University in Japan, and now works for Reitaku University.

== Career ==
=== 2005–2008 ===
Won Prostějov, Daegu, Seoul, First Super Series title in Fukuoka Lost in the semifinals of the US Open despite having three match points. Lost final of USD Open doubles. Won in Atlanta, San Diego and Hiroshima. Runner up at the masters. Loss San Diego with Houdet. Won Hiroshima with Fujimoto. At the Masters lost in the semis with Ammerlaan but went on to claim third. runner up in Nottingham Won Wimbledon. Won Paris Deagu Seoul

Kunieda started 2007 by returning to number one in the world as he won the Australian Open in a three set match. He won the other Masters events at the Grand Slams with titles in Paris and New York. Won in Boca Raton, Fukuoka, Notiingham, Utrecht, San Diego, He also made finals in Sydney, Prostějov, Paris, However he could only reach the semifinals in Atlanta and the Masters. Kunieda finished the year as the World Champion. With Ammerlaan he won Australian Open, their first Masters title as a team. At the other Masters, Kunieda lost in the final of Roland Garros and Wimbledon but won in New York with Saida. With Jeremiasz he won the doubles in Sydney. He also partnered with Saida as they won in Boca Raton, Fukuoka, Paris, Nottingham and Atlanta. Lost in Utrecht and San Diego finals as a team. As a team they could only reach the semifinals at the masters. Kunieda was part of the Japanese team that won the World Team Cup.

2008 saw Kunieda win both of the Masters titles which were on offer in Melbourne and Paris. Kunieda also won titles in Pensacola, Boca Raton, Fukuoka and Nottingham. At the Paralympics Kunieda won the title. With Saida he won the Australian Open. As a team they also won titles in Pensacola, Boca Raton, Fukuoka, Lost in Nottingham. At the 2008 Paralympics Kunieda and Saida lost in the semifinals but went on to claim the bronze medal. With Scheffers he won Roland Garros. Kunieda made both finals in Sydney but was unable to play in them due to rain. Kunieda was named the ITF World Champion for 2008.

=== 2009–2012 ===
In 2009, Kunieda won the Grand Slam. Kunieda won titles in Sydney, Fukuoka, Nottingham and St Louis. Kunieda was named as the 2009 ITF World Champion. In doubles competitions with Ammerlaan he won the Australian Open. As a team they also won in Sydney and St Louis. They were also finalists at Wimbledon. Won Daegu with Saida Helped team to 4th.

In 2010 Kunieda won both titles in Fukuoka and Paris. Kunieda won both titles in St Louis and won his 100th straight singles match in the process. He also won the singles in Kobe. Won both titles at the Australian Open and Roland Garros; including saving two match points in Melbourne to keep the streak going. Won the US Open. Kunieda lost in the semifinals of the doubles masters and masters. Kunieda completed his season by winning two golds at the 2010 Asian Para Games, winning the singles before combining with Saida for the doubles. He finished the year as the ITF World Champion.

2011 saw Kunieda win titles in Sydney, Kobe, Fukuoka and Paris. An elbow injury forced Kunieda to withdraw from both finals of the US Open USTA Wheelchair tennis Championships. At the Grand Slams Kunieda won both titles at the Australian Open. At Roland Garros he lost in the semifinals but won the US Open. Sydney doubles final loss, won Kobe and Japan doubles

"I'm tired, but I've done well. It's quite unbelievable. January and February was a hard time for me." "I worked hard so I could come and win. It was my dream to come here and it's become a reality.

— Kunieda after successfully defending his Paralympic title.

Kunieda started his 2012 season with a semifinal showing in the Japan Open. He then guided his country to the semifinals of the World Team Cup. Kunieda lost in the final of Roland Garros but won the doubles. Kunieda got back to winning ways by winning the French Open, where in the semifinals he defeated Houdet 12–10 in a final-set tiebreaker. He also won the Swiss Open and for the fourth time the British Open. He then became the first man to successfully defend the Paralympic Games Men's singles title. At the 2012 Masters Kunieda finally captured the elusive title.

=== 2013-2015 ===
In these years, Kunieda dominated the world of men's singles wheelchair events. In 2013, he started off by winning the APIA Sydney International Wheelchair Open. Then, he won his eighth Australian Open at the 2013 Australian Open, by beating Stéphane Houdet in the final. By doing so, he extended his winning streak to 34 matches. In the Airports Company South Africa SA Open, Kunieda lost in the semifinals to Gordon Reid, thus ending his 44 match winning streak. At the BNP Paribas 2013 Team World Cup, Kunieda won 2 out of 3 matches, including a Group 1 win over Stéphane Houdet. At the 2013 French Open, Kunieda reached his sixth final at the event, but lost to Stéphane Houdet in three tight sets.

=== 2021–2023 Non calendar year Grand Slam and retirement ===
In the Tokyo Paralympics, which was held in 2021 due to COVID-19, Kunieda won five matches without dropping a set to win gold in the singles. The semifinal win was against defending champion Reid and the final was against Egberink.

In the US Open Kunieda beat Ratzlaff, Reid and Hewett to win his 25th major singles title.

In the 2022 Australian Open Kunieda beat Gérard and Egberink to reach the final. In the final Kunieda beat Hewett 7–5, 3–6, 6–2.

In the 2022 French Open Kunieda beat Houdet and Oda to reach the final. In the final he beat Fernandez 6–2, 5–7, 7–5.

In the 2022 Wimbledon Championships Kunieda beat Egberink and defending champion Gérard to reach the final. In the final he faced Hewett. Kunieda lost the first set 4–6 but won the second set 7–5. In the deciding set Kunieda was 2–5 down and Hewett served for the championship four times. Despite this Kunieda won the deciding set 7–6 after winning the super tiebreaker 10–5. Victory meant that Kunieda had won the non calendar year Grand Slam and career Super Slam in the singles. This was his 28th major singles title. In the doubles Kunieda and his partner Fernandez beat defending champions Hewett and Reid 6–3, 6–1 in the final to end Hewett and Reid's streak of 10 major titles.

In the 2022 US Open Kunieda was hoping to win the Grand Slam. He beat Gérard, de la Puenta and Miki to reach the final. In the final he lost 6–7, 1–6 to Hewett.

He announced his retirement in January 2023.

== Playing style ==
Overwhelming "chair work" is a strength. Wheelchair tennis is allowed up to two bounces, but Kunieda hits almost all balls with one bounce. For opponents, it is a threat because the time to wait for the ball is halved. In 2008 former world No. 3 Michael Jeremias also said, "It's true that he has almighty abilities, but what he excels at is his speed of movement. He is outstanding in the current world of wheelchair tennis." Service and backhand have also been improved according to the times and injuries.

Until 2006, he was ranked around 10th in the world, but with the advice of Anne Quinn, a mental trainer he met at the Australian Open, he started saying "I'm the strongest!" The face was strengthened and after 10 months he became world rank 1.

== Career statistics ==
=== Grand Slam performance timelines ===
Key
W	F	SF	QF	#R	RR	Q#	DNQ	A	NH

(W) winner; (F) finalist; (SF) semifinalist; (QF) quarterfinalist; (#R) rounds 4, 3, 2, 1; (RR) round-robin stage; (Q#) qualification round; (DNQ) did not qualify; (A) absent; (NH) not held; (SR) strike rate (events won / competed); (W–L) win–loss record.
To avoid confusion and double counting, these charts are updated at the conclusion of a tournament or when the player's participation has ended.

==== Wheelchair singles ====
Tournament	2006	2007	2008	2009	2010	2011	2012	2013	2014	2015	2016	2017	2018	2019	2020	2021	2022	SR	W–L	Win %
Australian Open	A	W	W	W	W	W	A	W	W	W	QF	A	W	SF	W	SF	W	11 / 14	37–3	92.5%
French Open	NH	W	W	W	W	SF	F	F	W	W	SF	SF	W	SF	SF	F	W	8 / 16	34–8	80.95%
Wimbledon	Not held										A	SF	QF	F	NH	QF	W	1 / 5	6–4	60%
US Open	SF	W	NH	W	W	W	NH	F	W	W	NH	QF	F	QF	W	W	F	8 / 14	31–6	83.78%
Win–loss	1–1	9–0	7–0	9–0	8–0	7–1	2–1	7–2	9–0	9–0	1–2	2–3	8–2	4–4	7–1	6–3	12–1	28 / 49	108–21	83.72%

==== Wheelchair Doubles ====
Tournament	2006	2007	2008	2009	2010	2011	2012	2013	2014	2015	2016	2017	2018	2019	2020	2021	2022	SR	W–L
Australian Open	A	W	W	W	W	W	A	W	W	W	F	A	SF	SF	SF	SF	SF	8 / 14	–
French Open	NH	F	W	SF	W	W	W	W	SF	W	W	SF	SF	W	F	SF	SF	8 / 16	–
Wimbledon	W	F	A	F	F	SF	A	W	W	SF	A	SF	SF	SF	NH	SF	W	4 / 13	–
US Open	F	W	NH	SF	SF	SF	NH	SF	W	SF	NH	SF	SF	F	SF	F	QF	2 / 14	–
Win–loss	–	–	–	–	–	–	–	–	–	–	–	–	–	–	–	–	–	22 / 59	–

==== Grand Slam finals ====
===== Wheelchair singles: 35 finals (28 titles, 7 runner-ups) =====
Result	Year	Tournament	Surface	Opponent	Score
Win	2007	Australian Open	Hard	(France) Michaël Jérémiasz	6–3, 3–6, 6–3
Win	2007	French Open	Clay	(Netherlands) Robin Ammerlaan	6–3, 6–4
Win	2007	US Open	Hard	(Netherlands) Robin Ammerlaan	6–2, 6–2
Win	2008	Australian Open (2)	Hard	(France) Michaël Jérémiasz	6–1, 6–4
Win	2008	French Open (2)	Clay	(Netherlands) Robin Ammerlaan	6–0, 7–6
Win	2009	Australian Open (3)	Hard	(France) Stéphane Houdet	6–2, 6–4
Win	2009	French Open (3)	Clay	(France) Stéphane Houdet	6–3, 3–6, 6–3
Win	2009	US Open (2)	Hard	(Netherlands) Maikel Scheffers	6–0, 6–0
Win	2010	Australian Open (4)	Hard	(France) Stéphane Houdet	7–6, 2–6, 7–5
Win	2010	French Open (4)	Clay	(Sweden) Stefan Olsson	6–4, 6–0
Win	2010	US Open (3)	Hard	(France) Nicolas Peifer	Walkover
Win	2011	Australian Open (5)	Hard	(France) Stéphane Houdet	6–0, 6–3
Win	2011	US Open (4)	Hard	(France) Stéphane Houdet	3–6, 6–1, 6–0
Loss	2012	French Open	Clay	(France) Stéphane Houdet	2–6, 6–2, 6–7
Win	2013	Australian Open (6)	Hard	(France) Stéphane Houdet	6–2, 6–0
Loss	2013	French Open	Clay	(France) Stéphane Houdet	5–7, 7–5, 6–7
Loss	2013	US Open	Hard	(France) Stéphane Houdet	2–6, 4–6
Win	2014	Australian Open (7)	Hard	(Argentina) Gustavo Fernández	6–0, 6–1
Win	2014	French Open (5)	Clay	(France) Stéphane Houdet	6–4, 6–1
Win	2014	US Open (5)	Hard	(Argentina) Gustavo Fernández	7–6, 6–4
Win	2015	Australian Open (8)	Hard	(France) Stéphane Houdet	6–2, 6–2
Win	2015	French Open (6)	Clay	(France) Stéphane Houdet	6–1, 6–0
Win	2015	US Open (6)	Hard	(France) Stéphane Houdet	6–7, 6–3, 6–2
Win	2018	Australian Open (9)	Hard	(France) Stéphane Houdet	4–6, 6–1, 7–6
Win	2018	French Open (7)	Clay	(Argentina) Gustavo Fernández	7–6, 6–0
Loss	2018	US Open	Hard	(United Kingdom) Alfie Hewett	3–6, 5–7
Loss	2019	Wimbledon	Grass	(Argentina) Gustavo Fernández	6–4, 3–6, 2–6
Win	2020	Australian Open (10)	Hard	(United Kingdom) Gordon Reid	6–4, 6–4
Win	2020	US Open (7)	Hard	(United Kingdom) Alfie Hewett	6–3, 3–6, 7–6
Loss	2021	French Open	Clay	(United Kingdom) Alfie Hewett	3–6, 4–6
Win	2021	US Open (8)	Hard	(United Kingdom) Alfie Hewett	6–1, 6–4
Win	2022	Australian Open (11)	Hard	(United Kingdom) Alfie Hewett	7–5, 3–6, 6–2
Win	2022	French Open (8)	Clay	(Argentina) Gustavo Fernández	6–2, 5–7, 7–5
Win	2022	Wimbledon	Grass	(United Kingdom) Alfie Hewett	4–6, 7–5, 7–6
Loss	2022	US Open	Hard	(United Kingdom) Alfie Hewett	6–7, 1–6

Preceded by Robin Ammerlaan; Stéphane Houdet	ITF Wheelchair Tennis World Champion; 2007–2010; 2013–2015	Succeeded by Maikel Scheffers; Gordon Reid
