= 2021 Australian Open =

Tennis championships

- Date: 8–21 February 2021
- Edition: 109th Open Era (53rd)
- Category: Grand Slam
- Draw: 128S / 64D
- Prize money: A$71,500,000
- Surface: Hard (Plexicushion)
- Location: Melbourne, Victoria, Australia
- Venue: Melbourne Park (Note: Qualifying matches were held at Khalifa International Tennis and Squash Complex in Doha, Qatar (men) and Aviation Club Tennis Centre in Dubai, United Arab Emirates (women) due to Australia's quarantine restrictions.)
- Attendance: 130,374

Champions

Men's singles
- (Serbia) Novak Djokovic

Women's singles
- (Japan) Naomi Osaka

Men's doubles
- (Croatia) Ivan Dodig / (Slovakia) Filip Polášek

Women's doubles
- (Belgium) Elise Mertens / (Belarus) Aryna Sabalenka

Mixed doubles
- (Czech Republic) Barbora Krejčíková / (United States) Rajeev Ram

Wheelchair men's singles
- (Belgium) Joachim Gérard

Wheelchair women's singles
- (Netherlands) Diede de Groot

Wheelchair quad singles
- (Australia) Dylan Alcott

Wheelchair men's doubles
- (United Kingdom) Alfie Hewett / (United Kingdom) Gordon Reid

Wheelchair women's doubles
- (Netherlands) Diede de Groot / (Netherlands) Aniek van Koot

Wheelchair quad doubles
- (Australia) Dylan Alcott / (Australia) Heath Davidson
- Australian Open

The 2021 Australian Open was a Grand Slam tennis tournament that took place at Melbourne Park, on 8–21 February 2021. It was the 109th edition of the Australian Open, the 53rd in the Open Era, and the first Major tournament of the year. It was originally scheduled for 18–31 January 2021, but was postponed by three weeks to February due to the COVID-19 pandemic. The event was part of the 2021 ATP Tour and the 2021 WTA Tour.

The tournament consists of events for professional players in singles, doubles, and mixed doubles. Wheelchair players competed in singles and doubles tournaments. As in previous years, the tournament's main sponsor was Kia.

Novak Djokovic successfully defended the men's singles title as he claimed his 18th Grand Slam title, defeating Daniil Medvedev in straight sets. Sofia Kenin was the defending Women's Singles champion, but she lost to Kaia Kanepi in the second round. In the final, Naomi Osaka claimed her fourth Grand Slam singles title, defeating first-time Major finalist Jennifer Brady in straight sets.

== Tournament ==
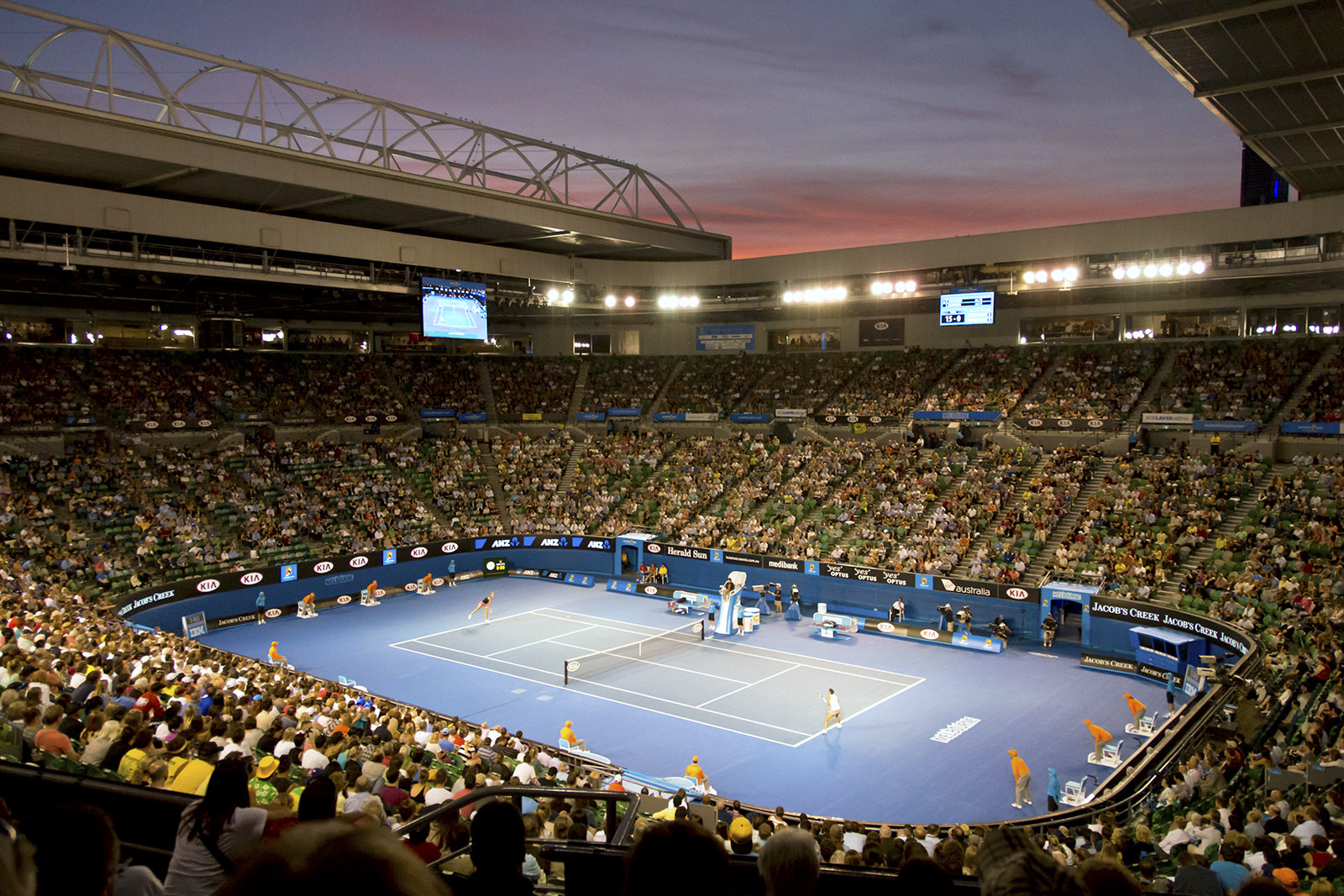
Rod Laver Arena in 2013, where the Finals of the Australian Open take place

The 2021 Australian Open is the 109th edition of the tournament, held at Melbourne Park in Melbourne, Victoria, Australia.

The tournament is run by the International Tennis Federation (ITF) and is part of the 2021 ATP Tour and the 2021 WTA Tour calendars under the Grand Slam category. The tournament consists of both men's and women's singles and doubles draws as well as the mixed doubles events. There are singles and doubles events for both boys and girls (players under 18), which are part of the Grade A category of tournaments. There are also singles, doubles and quad events for men's and women's wheelchair tennis players as part of the NEC tour under the Grand Slam category.

The tournament is played on hard courts and is taking place across a series of 25 courts, the four main show courts Rod Laver Arena, John Cain Arena (formerly Melbourne Arena), Margaret Court Arena and 1573 Arena.

For the first time in Grand Slam history, Hawk-Eye Live electronic line judging was used for all matches. Thus, calls could no longer be challenged by the players.

=== Impact of the COVID-19 pandemic ===
On 17 December 2020, due to the mandatory 14-day quarantine on all arrivals in the country, it was announced that the start of the tournament would be delayed by three weeks from 18 January 2021 to 8 February. This was to provide time for those who qualify to quarantine before the tournament. For the same reasons, the men's and women's qualifying matches were held outside of the country in Doha and Dubai respectively, and the junior and legends matches were not played.

To honour key workers, recordings of their voices were broadcast for line calls as part of the electronic system.

On 4 February 2021, all of the scheduled day's events leading up to the tournament, including the ATP Cup and warm-ups, had to be suspended after a 26-year-old man working at the hotel players were quarantining at tested positive for COVID-19. Victorian premier Daniel Andrews stated that the 8 February start would not be affected due to the schedule change. The events originally scheduled for 4 February as well as the draw ceremonies were held the next day.

The hard quarantine policy was viewed as significantly affecting the tournament bracket, especially in women's singles. In all, 26 players in the women's singles bracket were quarantined, with 12 of them seeded. Nine quarantined players, including four seeds (one of them, past Australian Open winner Angelique Kerber), lost in the first round to players who had not been quarantined. Of the 13 quarantined players who survived the first round, five (including two seeds) lost in the second round, and only 22 seed Jennifer Brady advanced past the third round. While the men's singles draw had more quarantined players (29 in all), the only seeded player among that group was No. 25 Benoît Paire. Six first-round matches were between players in this group; of the other 17 players who had been quarantined (including Paire), only Pablo Cuevas won his first-round match. The six survivors all lost in the second round.

==== Spectator restrictions ====
On 30 January 2021, Victorian sports minister Martin Pakula announced that the number of spectators would be limited to 30,000 per day during most of the tournament, which is around 50 percent of normal spectator capacity. Actual attendance was generally below this number, with a total attendance of 98,512 spectators during the first 10 days of the tournament. The last five days of the tournament would have up to 25,000 spectators per day.

On 12 February 2021, a five-day snap lockdown and stay-at-home order was declared by the Victoria State Government beginning at 11:59 p.m. AEDT, due to a cluster of active cases linked to another quarantine hotel in Melbourne, presumed to involve a highly-infectious variant of SARS-CoV2. As a result, the tournament was played behind closed doors from 11:30 p.m. AEDT that night; the final match of the day between Novak Djokovic and Taylor Fritz was suspended at that time to escort spectators from the premises.

On 17 February 2021, organizers announced that spectators would be allowed to return beginning 18 February. Each session was capped at 7,477 spectators.

== Singles players ==
Men's singles

Men's singles players
Champion		Runner-up	
(Serbia) Novak Djokovic [1]		(Russia) Daniil Medvedev [4]	
Semifinals out
(Russia) Aslan Karatsev (Q)		(Greece) Stefanos Tsitsipas [5]	
Quarterfinals out
(Germany) Alexander Zverev [6]	(Bulgaria) Grigor Dimitrov [18]	(Russia) Andrey Rublev [7]	(Spain) Rafael Nadal [2]
4th round out
(Canada) Milos Raonic [14]	(Serbia) Dušan Lajović [23]	(Austria) Dominic Thiem [3]	(Canada) Félix Auger-Aliassime [20]
(Norway) Casper Ruud [24]	(United States) Mackenzie McDonald (PR)	(Italy) Matteo Berrettini [9]	(Italy) Fabio Fognini [16]
3rd round out
(United States) Taylor Fritz [27]	(Hungary) Márton Fucsovics	(Spain) Pedro Martínez	(France) Adrian Mannarino [32]
(Australia) Nick Kyrgios	(Spain) Pablo Carreño Busta [15]	(Canada) Denis Shapovalov [11]	(Argentina) Diego Schwartzman [8]
(Spain) Feliciano López	(Moldova) Radu Albot	(South Africa) Lloyd Harris	(Serbia) Filip Krajinović [28]
(Sweden) Mikael Ymer	(Russia) Karen Khachanov [19]	(Australia) Alex de Minaur [21]	(United Kingdom) Cameron Norrie
2nd round out
(United States) Frances Tiafoe	(United States) Reilly Opelka	(Switzerland) Stan Wawrinka [17]	(France) Corentin Moutet
(Finland) Emil Ruusuvuori	(Kazakhstan) Alexander Bublik	(Serbia) Miomir Kecmanović	(United States) Maxime Cressy (Q)
(Germany) Dominik Koepfer	(France) Ugo Humbert [29]	(Australia) Alex Bolt (WC)	(Czech Republic) Jiří Veselý
(Australia) Bernard Tomic (Q)	(Australia) James Duckworth	(Belarus) Egor Gerasimov	(France) Alexandre Müller (LL)
(Brazil) Thiago Monteiro	(Italy) Lorenzo Sonego [31]	(United States) Tommy Paul	(Australia) Christopher O'Connell (WC)
(Australia) Alexei Popyrin (WC)	(Croatia) Borna Ćorić [22]	(Spain) Pablo Andújar	(Spain) Roberto Carballés Baena
(Australia) Thanasi Kokkinakis (WC)	(Spain) Carlos Alcaraz (Q)	(Lithuania) Ričardas Berankis	(Czech Republic) Tomáš Macháč (Q)
(Italy) Salvatore Caruso	(Uruguay) Pablo Cuevas	(Russia) Roman Safiullin (Q)	(United States) Michael Mmoh (Q)
1st round out
(France) Jérémy Chardy	(Italy) Stefano Travaglia	(Chinese Taipei) Lu Yen-hsun (PR)	(Spain) Albert Ramos Viñolas
(Portugal) Pedro Sousa	(Australia) Marc Polmans (WC)	(Australia) John Millman	(Argentina) Federico Coria
(France) Gaël Monfils [10]	(Japan) Yoshihito Nishioka	(Slovenia) Aljaž Bedene	(Ukraine) Sergiy Stakhovsky (Q)
(Austria) Dennis Novak	(Poland) Kamil Majchrzak	(Japan) Taro Daniel (LL)	(United States) Marcos Giron
(Kazakhstan) Mikhail Kukushkin	(Bolivia) Hugo Dellien (LL)	(Portugal) Frederico Ferreira Silva (Q)	(Japan) Yasutaka Uchiyama
(Croatia) Marin Čilić	(Slovakia) Norbert Gombos	(Belgium) Kimmer Coppejans (Q)	(Japan) Kei Nishikori
(Italy) Jannik Sinner	(Japan) Yūichi Sugita	(Bosnia and Herzegovina) Damir Džumhur (LL)	(Germany) Cedrik-Marcel Stebe (LL)
(France) Benoît Paire [25]	(Italy) Gianluca Mager	(Argentina) Juan Ignacio Londero	(Sweden) Elias Ymer (Q)
(Germany) Yannick Hanfmann	(Slovakia) Andrej Martin	(Australia) Li Tu (WC)	(United States) Sam Querrey
(Australia) Jordan Thompson	(Georgia (country)) Nikoloz Basilashvili	(Germany) Jan-Lennard Struff	(Spain) Roberto Bautista Agut [12]
(Belgium) David Goffin [13]	(Denmark) Mikael Torpegaard (LL)	(Italy) Marco Cecchinato	(Argentina) Guido Pella
(Netherlands) Robin Haase (LL)	(France) Quentin Halys (Q)	(Hungary) Attila Balázs	(Canada) Vasek Pospisil
(France) Gilles Simon	(South Korea) Kwon Soon-woo	(Netherlands) Botic van de Zandschulp (Q)	(Poland) Hubert Hurkacz [26]
(Australia) Aleksandar Vukic (WC)	(India) Sumit Nagal (WC)	(Spain) Mario Vilella Martínez (Q)	(South Africa) Kevin Anderson
(France) Pierre-Hugues Herbert	(Switzerland) Henri Laaksonen (Q)	(Italy) Andreas Seppi	(United States) Tennys Sandgren
(United Kingdom) Dan Evans [30]	(Belarus) Ilya Ivashka	(Serbia) Viktor Troicki (Q)	(Serbia) Laslo Đere

Women's singles

Women's singles players
Champion		Runner-up	
(Japan) Naomi Osaka [3]		(United States) Jennifer Brady [22]	
Semifinals out
(Czech Republic) Karolína Muchová [25]		(United States) Serena Williams [10]	
Quarterfinals out
(Australia) Ashleigh Barty [1]	(United States) Jessica Pegula	(Chinese Taipei) Hsieh Su-wei	(Romania) Simona Halep [2]
4th round out
(United States) Shelby Rogers	(Belgium) Elise Mertens [18]	(Croatia) Donna Vekić [28]	(Ukraine) Elina Svitolina [5]
(Czech Republic) Markéta Vondroušová [19]	(Spain) Garbiñe Muguruza [14]	(Belarus) Aryna Sabalenka [7]	(Poland) Iga Świątek [15]
3rd round out
(Russia) Ekaterina Alexandrova [29]	(Estonia) Anett Kontaveit [21]	(Switzerland) Belinda Bencic [11]	(Czech Republic) Karolína Plíšková [6]
(Estonia) Kaia Kanepi	(Slovenia) Kaja Juvan (Q)	(France) Kristina Mladenovic	(Kazakhstan) Yulia Putintseva [26]
(Italy) Sara Errani (Q)	(Romania) Sorana Cîrstea	(Kazakhstan) Zarina Diyas	(Tunisia) Ons Jabeur [27]
(United States) Ann Li	(Russia) Anastasia Potapova	(France) Fiona Ferro	(Russia) Veronika Kudermetova [32]
2nd round out
(Australia) Daria Gavrilova (WC)	(Czech Republic) Barbora Krejčíková	(United Kingdom) Heather Watson	(Serbia) Olga Danilović (Q)
(Russia) Svetlana Kuznetsova	(China) Zhu Lin	(Germany) Mona Barthel (PR)	(United States) Danielle Collins
(United States) Sofia Kenin [4]	(Argentina) Nadia Podoroska	(United States) Madison Brengle	(Egypt) Mayar Sherif (Q)
(Australia) Samantha Stosur (WC)	(Japan) Nao Hibino	(Belgium) Alison Van Uytvanck	(United States) Coco Gauff
(Canada) Bianca Andreescu [8]	(United States) Venus Williams	(Canada) Rebecca Marino (Q)	(Czech Republic) Petra Kvitová [9]
(Russia) Liudmila Samsonova (Q)	(United States) Bernarda Pera	(Slovakia) Anna Karolína Schmiedlová (LL)	(France) Caroline Garcia
(Russia) Daria Kasatkina	(France) Alizé Cornet	(Hungary) Tímea Babos (Q)	(Serbia) Nina Stojanović
(Italy) Camila Giorgi	(Kazakhstan) Elena Rybakina [17]	(Russia) Varvara Gracheva	(Australia) Ajla Tomljanović
1st round out
(Montenegro) Danka Kovinić	(Spain) Sara Sorribes Tormo	(China) Zheng Saisai	(Italy) Martina Trevisan
(Belarus) Aliaksandra Sasnovich	(Czech Republic) Kristýna Plíšková	(United Kingdom) Francesca Jones (Q)	(Croatia) Petra Martić [16]
(United States) Lauren Davis	(Czech Republic) Barbora Strýcová	(United States) Whitney Osuigwe (Q)	(Canada) Leylah Annie Fernandez
(Latvia) Jeļena Ostapenko	(Italy) Elisabetta Cocciaretto (Q)	(Romania) Ana Bogdan	(Italy) Jasmine Paolini
(Australia) Maddison Inglis (WC)	(Latvia) Anastasija Sevastova	(United States) Christina McHale	(China) Wang Yafan
(Spain) Aliona Bolsova	(Australia) Arina Rodionova (WC)	(France) Chloé Paquet (Q)	(United Kingdom) Johanna Konta [13]
(Belarus) Victoria Azarenka [12]	(Australia) Destanee Aiava (WC)	(Australia) Astra Sharma (WC)	(Greece) Maria Sakkari [20]
(United States) Sloane Stephens	(France) Clara Burel (Q)	(Switzerland) Jil Teichmann	(Czech Republic) Marie Bouzková
(Romania) Mihaela Buzărnescu (LL)	(Bulgaria) Tsvetana Pironkova (Q)	(Belgium) Kirsten Flipkens	(China) Wang Qiang [30]
(Sweden) Rebecca Peterson	(Australia) Kimberly Birrell (WC)	(Romania) Patricia Maria Țig	(Belgium) Greet Minnen (Q)
(Russia) Margarita Gasparyan (LL)	(Spain) Paula Badosa	(Slovenia) Tamara Zidanšek	(Germany) Angelique Kerber [23]
(Germany) Andrea Petkovic	(Japan) Mayo Hibi (Q)	(Slovenia) Polona Hercog	(Russia) Anastasia Pavlyuchenkova
(Slovakia) Viktória Kužmová	(United Kingdom) Katie Boulter (PR)	(Russia) Valeria Savinykh (Q)	(China) Zhang Shuai [31]
(United States) Alison Riske [24]	(Belgium) Ysaline Bonaventure (LL)	(Romania) Irina-Camelia Begu	(Germany) Laura Siegemund
(Netherlands) Arantxa Rus	(Kazakhstan) Yaroslava Shvedova (PR)	(Czech Republic) Kateřina Siniaková	(Russia) Vera Zvonareva (PR)
(Ukraine) Marta Kostyuk	(Russia) Anna Blinkova	(Japan) Misaki Doi	(Australia) Lizette Cabrera (WC)

== Events ==
=== Men's singles ===
- (Serbia) Novak Djokovic def. (Russia) Daniil Medvedev, 7–5, 6–2, 6–2

The Men's Singles final was the last match of the tournament, taking place on 21 February. Top seed Novak Djokovic defeated No. 4 Daniil Medvedev in straight sets to win his 18th Grand Slam singles championship and his ninth overall (and third consecutive) Australian Open, in a game that lasted an hour and 53 minutes.

Djokovic started the match winning the first three games of the first set and advancing to a 3–0 lead. In this period, he won 13 of the first 16 points, limiting Medvedev to three. Medvedev mounted a brief comeback to win the next three games to match Djokovic 3–3, and both of the players held the next two of their games to reach a scoreline of 5–5. Djokovic broke Medvedev's next serve to win the first set 7–5.

Djokovic started the second set with a fault, and a subsequent break for Medvedev. However, Medvedev went on to lose the next two games of his serve. The set ended with Djokovic winning 6–2.

Djokovic had an early lead in the third set, winning the first three games to gain a lead of 3–0. Medvedev was then able to win his first game with a lunge and lob at the net, which Djokovic was unable to return. Both would hold the next two games off their own serve with the score reaching 5–2. Djokovic went on to win the next game, breaking Medvedev's serve, with the final point having him reach to the net and hit a cross-shot across to win the championship. Through the match, Medvedev made a total of 67 errors, of which 30 were unforced errors, while Djokovic had 17 unforced errors. This was Djokovic's ninth Australian open win and 18th grand slams title. 2001 Wimbledon winner Goran Ivanišević, who was part of Djokovic's coaching staff, praised his play and total control through the game, calling his performance, "a masterpiece".

=== Women's singles ===
- (Japan) Naomi Osaka def. (United States) Jennifer Brady, 6–4, 6–3

In the Women's Singles final, played on 20 February, No. 3 Naomi Osaka earned her fourth Grand Slam singles title (and her second at the Australian Open) by defeating first-time Grand Slam finalist Jennifer Brady, the No. 22 seed in straight sets in a match that lasted an hour and 17 minutes. Osaka progressed through the tournament having lost only one set, and became the first woman to win each of her first four Grand Slam singles finals appearances since 1991.

Osaka began the final with service, and dominated the first game without conceding a point. Likewise, Brady held service in the second game, but required two deuces to tie the set at 1–1. Osaka held again to take the lead, and achieved a break in the fourth game, again without conceding a point. Brady subsequently broke Osaka's serve, and held in the sixth game, levelling the set at 3–3. Each player held service once to tie at 4–4 before Osaka took the lead at 5–4 and broke Brady's serve to win the first set, 6–4. The final point of the first set came with Brady charging to the net and trying to smash the ball but finding the net instead.

The second set began with Osaka serving, and she took control of the set shortly thereafter. She held in the first and third games, and broke Brady's service in the second and fourth, jumping out to a 4–0 lead whilst conceding no more than 30 points in any of those games. Brady won her first game of the set breaking Osaka's serve coming from a position of deuce, before winning from an unforced error from Osaka. Both players would hold their next two games, putting the score at 5–3. Osaka took advantage of two forced errors and won the game without conceding, ending the set at 6–3 and winning her the title after 1 hour and 17 minutes.

Brady had a total of 31 unforced errors with four double faults to Osaka's 24 with two double faults.

=== Men's doubles ===
- (Croatia) Ivan Dodig / (Slovakia) Filip Polášek def. (United States) Rajeev Ram / (United Kingdom) Joe Salisbury, 6–3, 6–4

The Men's Doubles title was decided on 21 February, as the No. 9 seeded pair of Ivan Dodig and Filip Polášek defeated the No. 5 seeded pair of Rajeev Ram and Joe Salisbury. The match was decided in straight sets (the first such match for the winning pair since the third round), and was the second and first Grand Slam doubles titles for Dodig and Polášek, respectively, in their third and first appearances.

=== Women's doubles ===
- (Belgium) Elise Mertens / (Belarus) Aryna Sabalenka def. (Czech Republic) Barbora Krejčíková / (Czech Republic) Kateřina Siniaková, 6–2, 6–3

No. 3 seeded duo Elise Mertens and Aryna Sabalenka captured their second Grand Slam doubles title as a pair in the championship match of the Women's Doubles event, defeating the Czech No. 2 duo of Barbora Krejčíková and Kateřina Siniaková in straight sets. Following the conclusion of the match, Sabalenka announced that the pair would not play doubles together for the remainder of the year, so that she could focus on singles.

=== Mixed doubles ===
- (Czech Republic) Barbora Krejčíková / (United States) Rajeev Ram def. (Australia) Samantha Stosur / (Australia) Matthew Ebden, 6–1, 6–4.

The sixth-seeded duo of Women's Doubles finalist Barbora Krejčíková and Men's Doubles finalist Rajeev Ram defeated Australian duo Samantha Stosur and Matthew Ebden in straight sets on 20 February to win the Mixed Doubles event. The title was their second as a pair, and the third and second overall for Krejčíková and Ram, respectively.

=== Wheelchair men's singles ===
- (Belgium) Joachim Gérard def. (United Kingdom) Alfie Hewett, 6–0, 4–6, 6–4

The final of the wheelchair men's singles took place on February 17 between two of the unseeded players after the top two seeds fell in the quarter-finals and semi-finals respectively. In the final between Belgian player, Joachim Gérard and British player, Alfie Hewett it would be Gérard who would take out the wheelchair men's singles in three sets to record his first grand slam singles title.

=== Wheelchair women's singles ===
- (Netherlands) Diede de Groot def. (Japan) Yui Kamiji, 6–3, 6–7^{(4–7)}, 7–6^{(10–4)}

The final of the wheelchair women's singles was played between the top two seeds in the tournament, Dutch player Diede de Groot and Japanese player Yui Kamiji. The match which was played on the 17 February saw the two tennis players had their match go to three sets with de Groot claiming her third Australian Open title in a tiebreaker.

=== Wheelchair quad singles ===
- (Australia) Dylan Alcott def. (Netherlands) Sam Schröder, 6–1, 6–0

The final of the Quad Singles was played on the 17 February between Australian top seed Dylan Alcott and Dutch player, Sam Schröder. The match which was originally going to be held on Rod Laver Arena after the quarter-final match between Stefanos Tsitsipas and Rafael Nadal but after that match went into a fifth set, the match was moved over to Margaret Court Arena. After being broken in the first game of the match, Alcott raced away winning the next twelve games to record his 12th major Grand Slam quad singles title.

=== Wheelchair men's doubles ===
- (United Kingdom) Alfie Hewett / (United Kingdom) Gordon Reid def. (France) Stéphane Houdet / (France) Nicolas Peifer, 7–5, 7–6^{(7–3)}

The final of the wheelchair men's doubles tournament was played on 16 February in what was a rematch of the 2020 final. The British pair of Alfie Hewett and Gordon Reid took their tenth Grand Slam title as a duo, with the pair winning in straight sets.

=== Wheelchair women's doubles ===
- (Netherlands) Diede de Groot / (Netherlands) Aniek van Koot def. (South Africa) Kgothatso Montjane / (United Kingdom) Lucy Shuker, 6–4, 6–1.

The wheelchair women's doubles final, which was played on 16 February, was won by Dutch duo Diede de Groot and Aniek van Koot in straight sets. It was the ninth Grand Slam doubles title for de Groot and the sixteenth for van Koot.

=== Wheelchair quad doubles ===
- (Australia) Dylan Alcott / (Australia) Heath Davidson def. (United Kingdom) Andy Lapthorne / (United States) David Wagner, 6–2, 3–6, [10–7]

The wheelchair quad doubles championship match, a rematch of the last four finals (most recently in 2020), was held on 16 February with Dylan Alcott and Heath Davidson defeating Andy Lapthorne and David Wagner in a third-set tiebreak. It was the seventh and fourth Wheelchair quad doubles title for Alcott and Davidson, respectively.

== Point distribution and prize money ==
=== Point distribution ===
2,000 points were awarded to the winners of the men's and women's singles titles. The men's finalist received 1,200 and the women's finalist received 1,300. Men's singles semifinalists each got 720 points, while women's singles semifinalists got 780. Those that were eliminated in the men's singles quarterfinals got 360 points, while women's singles players eliminated in the quarterfinals got 430. The point allotment for those eliminated in the first four rounds of the tournament decreases the earlier a player was eliminated; for the men's singles tournament, the points given were 180, 90, 45, and 10 for each of the first four rounds, while women's singles players got 240, 130, 70, and 10 for an exit in the first four rounds.

All winners of a wheelchair competition received 800 points, with the finalists of all competitions except the quad doubles receiving 500 points. Participants eliminated in the first round of their respective wheelchair competitions received 100 points; for singles and quad singles, this was the quarterfinals, for doubles it was the semifinals, and for quad doubles it was the final. Participants eliminated in the semifinals in singles or quad singles received 375 points.

Below is a series of tables for each of the competitions showing the ranking points on offer for each event.

==== Senior points ====
Event	W	F	SF	QF	Round of 16	Round of 32	Round of 64	Round of 128	Q	Q3	Q2	Q1
Men's singles	2000	1200	720	360	180	90	45	10	25	16	8	0
Men's doubles	2000	1200	720	360	180	90	0	—N/a	—N/a	—N/a	—N/a	—N/a
Women's singles	2000	1300	780	430	240	130	70	10	40	30	20	2
Women's doubles	2000	1300	780	430	240	130	10	—N/a	—N/a	—N/a	—N/a	—N/a

==== Wheelchair points ====
Event	W	F	SF/3rd	QF/4th
Singles	800	500	375	100
Doubles	800	500	100	—N/a
Quad singles	800	500	100	—N/a
Quad doubles	800	100	—N/a	—N/a

=== Prize money ===
The Australian Open total prize money for 2021 increased by 0.7% to a tournament record A$71,500,000.

Event	W	F	SF	QF	Round of 16	Round of 32	Round of 64	Round of 128^{1}	Q3	Q2	Q1
Singles	A$2,750,000	A$1,500,000	A$850,000	A$525,000	A$320,000	A$215,000	A$150,000	A$100,000	A$52,500	A$35,000	A$25,000
Doubles *	A$600,000	A$340,000	A$200,000	A$110,000	A$65,000	A$45,000	A$30,000	—N/a	—N/a	—N/a	—N/a
Mixed doubles *	A$150,000	A$85,000	A$45,000	A$24,000	A$12,000	A$6,250	—N/a	—N/a	—N/a	—N/a	—N/a

^{1}Qualifiers prize money was also the Round of 128 prize money.
*per team

== Notes ==
Preceded by 2020 French Open	Grand Slams	Succeeded by 2021 French Open
