= Alfie Hewett =

British wheelchair tennis player

Alfie Hewett OBE
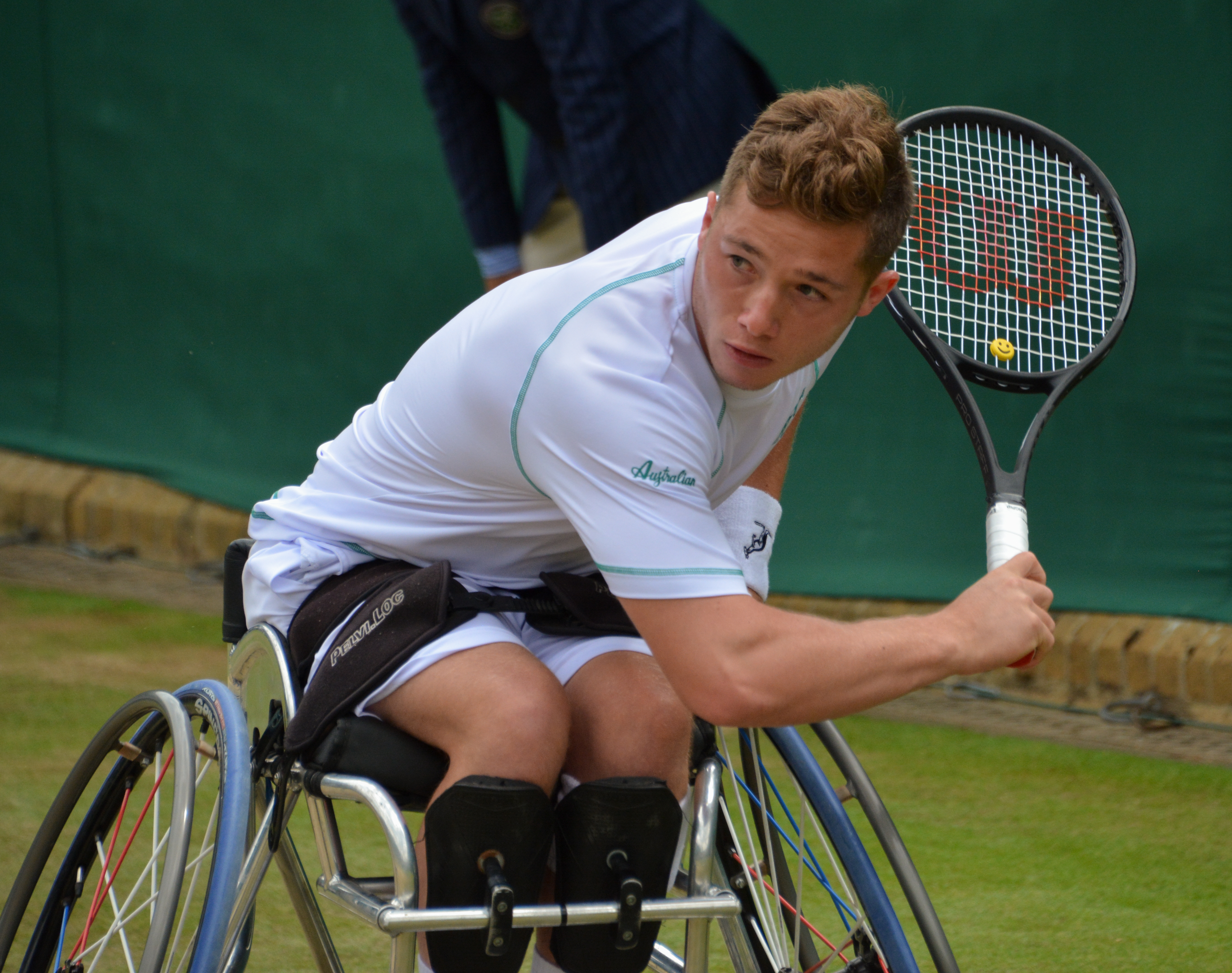
- Hewett at the 2017 Wimbledon Championships
- Country (sports): Great Britain
- Born: 6 December 1997 (age 28) Norwich, England
- Height: 1.67 m (5 ft 6 in)
- Turned pro: 2015
- Plays: Right-handed

Singles
- Highest ranking: No. 1 (29 January 2018)
- Current ranking: No. 2 (23 September 2024)

Grand Slam singles results
- Australian Open: W (2023, 2025)
- French Open: W (2017, 2020, 2021)
- Wimbledon: W (2024)
- US Open: W (2018, 2019, 2022, 2023, 2026)

Other tournaments
- Masters: W (2017, 2021, 2023)
- Paralympic Games: Silver Medal (2016, 2024)

Doubles
- Highest ranking: No. 1 (3 February 2020)
- Current ranking: No. 1 (11 July 2026)

Grand Slam doubles results
- Australian Open: W (2020, 2021, 2022, 2023, 2024, 2025)
- French Open: W (2020, 2021, 2022, 2023, 2024, 2025, 2026)
- Wimbledon: W (2016, 2017, 2018, 2021, 2023, 2024, 2026)
- US Open: W (2017, 2018, 2019, 2020, 2021, 2026)

Other doubles tournaments
- Masters Doubles: W (2017, 2021, 2023)
- Paralympic Games: Gold Medal (2024); Silver Medal (2016, 2020)
- Last updated on: 30 January 2022.

Alfie Hewett (born 6 December 1997) is a British professional wheelchair tennis player. He is the current world No. 2 in singles and world No. 1 in doubles.

Hewett has won a total of 37 major titles: 11 in singles and 26 in doubles, partnering Gordon Reid for all of the latter. The pair completed the Grand Slam in 2021 (the first to do so since Stéphane Houdet first achieved the feat in 2014 with multiple partners), and won Paralympic gold in men's doubles at the 2024 Summer Paralympics, having been silver medalists in the two previous Games. Hewett is also a two-time Paralympic silver medalist in singles (in 2016 and 2024). He won the Wheelchair Tennis Masters in both singles and doubles in 2017, 2021, and 2023.

Hewett was born with a congenital heart defect that required surgery at six months, and suffered from Legg–Calvé–Perthes disease, a condition that inhibits blood flow from the pelvis to the hip joint. His ability to walk was severely impaired and from the age of six he has been a wheelchair user. Though able to walk, Hewett is not fully mobile in the conventional sense and cannot participate in able-bodied sports.

== Tennis career ==
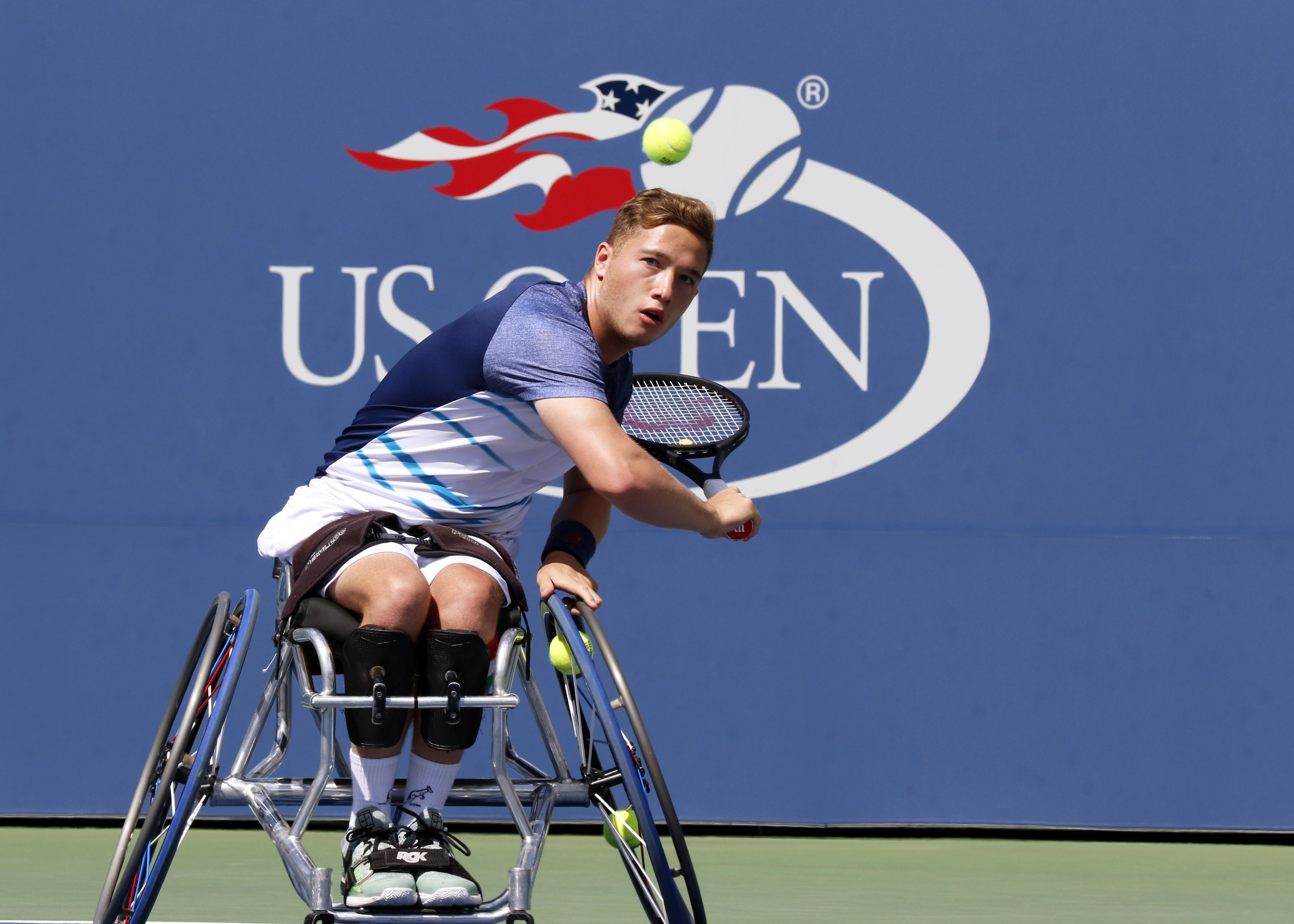
Alfie Hewett at the 2017 US Open

Hewett attended Acle High School and went on to study Sport and Exercise Science at City College Norwich.

In July 2016 Hewett won the 2016 Wimbledon Championships – Wheelchair men's doubles, alongside Gordon Reid, coming back from a set down to win against the French pair Stéphane Houdet and Nicolas Peifer.

He won a silver medal in the men's singles event at Rio 2016 and silver in the doubles event with Reid, who beat him in the singles final.

In May 2017 Hewett won his first Grand Slam in singles at the French Open, beating Gustavo Fernández of Argentina in three sets, despite losing the first to love.

In July 2017, in a repeat of the final a year earlier, Hewett won the 2017 Wimbledon Championships – Wheelchair men's doubles, alongside Reid, winning in three sets against Houdet and Peifer.

Hewett won the 2017 NEC Wheelchair Tennis Masters in Loughborough, UK. He ended 2017 ranked No 2 in the world, then a career-high.

On 29 January 2018 Hewett became the world number 1.

In March 2018 Hewett won his first Super Series singles title at the Cajun Classic in Baton Rouge, USA.

On 2 September 2018 he claimed his second Super Series title at the US Open USTA Wheelchair Championships in St. Louis. Later that month Hewett won the singles title at the US Open as well as the doubles title with Reid.

In September 2019 he successfully defended both his singles and, with Reid, doubles titles at the US Open.

In 2020 Hewett won the French Open singles title in three sets against Joachim Gérard and partnered Reid to win all three available Grand Slam doubles titles at the Australian Open, US Open and French Open, with the Wimbledon Championships cancelled due to the COVID-19 pandemic.

After winning a silver medal in the men's doubles with Reid at the 2020 Summer Paralympics and losing the bronze medal singles match to Reid, world number 2 Hewett spoke about his Paralympic future being "out of his hands", due to a review into whether his disability is severe enough to qualify him to play in a wheelchair under the 2019 revision of International Tennis Federation rules. Hewett was allowed to continue his tennis career after an alteration to the new ITF rules in November 2021.

Hewett was appointed Officer of the Order of the British Empire (OBE) in the 2023 Birthday Honours for services to tennis.

Hewett kicked off 2024 by winning a fifth Australian Open doubles title in a row with Reid. In May 2024 Hewett was part of the Great Britain team which won the World Team Cup for a second successive year beating Spain 2–0 in the final of the event held in Turkey. It was the team's fourth win in the competition since 2015.

Hewett and Reid won a fifth straight French Open in June with a 6-1 6–4 victory over second-seeded Japanese duo Takuya Miki and Tokito Oda in the final.

At the 2024 Wimbledon Championships, Hewett defeated Martín de la Puente in the final, 6–2, 6–3, to complete the singles career Grand Slam. He and Reid also won doubles title, defeating Takuya Miki and Tokito Oda in the final, 6–4, 7–6^{(7–2)}.

Hewett won the doubles gold medal at the 2024 Summer Paralympics in Paris, France. He lost in Paralympic wheelchair tennis men's singles final.

In 2026, Hewett was the men's singles champion of the inaugural Miami Open wheelchair tournament, which was played at the WT500 level and at the same time and venue as the Miami Open tournament for the ATP and the WTA tours. Hewett secured the title after beating Tokito Oda of Japan in two sets at the final.

== Career statistics ==
=== Grand Slam performance timelines ===
Key
W	F	SF	QF	#R	RR	Q#	DNQ	A	NH

(W) winner; (F) finalist; (SF) semifinalist; (QF) quarterfinalist; (#R) rounds 4, 3, 2, 1; (RR) round-robin stage; (Q#) qualification round; (DNQ) did not qualify; (A) absent; (NH) not held; (SR) strike rate (events won / competed); (W–L) win–loss record.
To avoid confusion and double counting, these charts are updated at the conclusion of a tournament or when the player's participation has ended.

==== Wheelchair singles ====
Tournament	2016	2017	2018	2019	2020	2021	2022	2023	2024	2025	2026	SR	W–L	Win %
Grand Slam tournaments
Australian Open	A	QF	QF	QF	SF	F	F	W	F	W	SF	2 / 10	18–8	69%
French Open	A	W	QF	SF	W	W	SF	F	SF	F	F	3 / 10	22–7	76%
Wimbledon	QF	SF	SF	QF	NH	QF	F	F	W	F	F	1 / 10	16–9	64%
US Open	NH	F	W	W	F	F	W	W	NH	SF	W	5 / 9	26–4	87%
Win–loss	0–1	6–3	4–3	4–3	6–2	7–3	9–3	13–2	9–2	12–3	12–3	11 / 38	82–28	75%

==== Wheelchair doubles ====
Tournament	2015	2016	2017	2018	2019	2020	2021	2022	2023	2024	2025	2026	SR	W–L	Win %
Grand Slam tournaments
Australian Open	A	A	F	F	SF	W	W	W	W	W	W	SF	6 / 10	18–4	82%
French Open	A	A	F	SF	SF	W	W	W	W	W	W	W	7 / 10	16–3	84%
Wimbledon	SF	W	W	W	F	NH	W	F	W	W	F	W	7 / 11	20–4	83%
US Open	A	NH	W	W	W	W	W	F (Note: Hewett received a walkover in the quarterfinals of the 2022 US Open, which does not count as a win.)	SF	NH	F	W	6 / 9	14–3	82%
Win–loss	0–1	2–0	6–2	5–2	3–3	6–0	8–0	6–2	9–1	9–0	10–2	10–1	24 / 40	74–14	84%

==== Grand Slam tournament finals ====
===== Wheelchair singles: 24 (11 titles, 13 runner-ups) =====
Result	Year	Tournament	Surface	Opponent	Score
Win	2017	French Open	Clay	(Argentina) Gustavo Fernández	0–6, 7–6^{(11–9)}, 6–2
Loss	2017	US Open	Hard	(France) Stéphane Houdet	2–6, 6–4, 3–6
Win	2018	US Open	Hard	(Japan) Shingo Kunieda	6–3, 7–5
Win	2019	US Open (2)	Hard	(France) Stéphane Houdet	7–6^{(11–9)}, 7–6^{(7–5)}
Loss	2020	US Open	Hard	(Japan) Shingo Kunieda	3–6, 6–3, 6–7^{(3–7)}
Win	2020	French Open (2)	Clay	(Belgium) Joachim Gérard	6–4, 4–6, 6–3
Loss	2021	Australian Open	Hard	(Belgium) Joachim Gérard	0–6, 6–4, 4–6
Win	2021	French Open (3)	Clay	(Japan) Shingo Kunieda	6–3, 6–4
Loss	2021	US Open	Hard	(Japan) Shingo Kunieda	1–6, 4–6
Loss	2022	Australian Open	Hard	(Japan) Shingo Kunieda	5–7, 6–3, 2–6
Loss	2022	Wimbledon	Grass	(Japan) Shingo Kunieda	6–4, 5–7, 6–7^{(5–10)}
Win	2022	US Open (3)	Hard	(Japan) Shingo Kunieda	7–6^{(7–2)}, 6–1
Win	2023	Australian Open	Hard	(Japan) Tokito Oda	6–3, 6–1
Loss	2023	French Open	Clay	(Japan) Tokito Oda	1–6, 4–6
Loss	2023	Wimbledon	Grass	(Japan) Tokito Oda	4–6, 2–6
Win	2023	US Open (4)	Hard	(United Kingdom) Gordon Reid	6–4, 6–3
Loss	2024	Australian Open	Hard	(Japan) Tokito Oda	2–6, 4–6
Win	2024	Wimbledon	Grass	(Spain) Martín de la Puente	6–2, 6–3
Win	2025	Australian Open (2)	Hard	(Japan) Tokito Oda	6–4, 6–4
Loss	2025	French Open	Clay	(Japan) Tokito Oda	4–6, 6–7^{(6–8)}
Loss	2025	Wimbledon	Grass	(Japan) Tokito Oda	6–3, 5–7, 2–6
Loss	2026	French Open	Clay	(Japan) Tokito Oda	3–6, 3–6
Loss	2026	Wimbledon	Grass	(Japan) Tokito Oda	1–6, 1–6
Win	2026	US Open	Hard	(Japan) Tokito Oda	6–0, 7–6^{(7–5)}

===== Wheelchair doubles: 32 (25 titles, 7 runner-ups) =====
Result	Year	Championship	Surface	Partner	Opponents	Score
Win	2016	Wimbledon	Grass	(United Kingdom) Gordon Reid	(France) Stéphane Houdet (France) Nicolas Peifer	4–6, 6–1, 7–6^{(8–6)}
Loss	2017	Australian Open	Hard	(Argentina) Gustavo Fernández	(Belgium) Joachim Gérard (United Kingdom) Gordon Reid	3–6, 6–3, [3–10]
Loss	2017	French Open	Clay	(United Kingdom) Gordon Reid	(France) Stéphane Houdet (France) Nicolas Peifer	4–6, 3–6
Win	2017	Wimbledon (2)	Grass	(United Kingdom) Gordon Reid	(France) Stéphane Houdet (France) Nicolas Peifer	6–7^{(5–7)}, 7–5, 7–6^{(7–3)}
Win	2017	US Open	Hard	(United Kingdom) Gordon Reid	(France) Stéphane Houdet (France) Nicolas Peifer	7–5, 6–4
Loss	2018	Australian Open	Hard	(United Kingdom) Gordon Reid	(France) Stéphane Houdet (France) Nicolas Peifer	4–6, 2–6
Win	2018	Wimbledon (3)	Grass	(United Kingdom) Gordon Reid	(Belgium) Joachim Gérard (Sweden) Stefan Olsson	6–1, 6–4
Win	2018	US Open (2)	Hard	(United Kingdom) Gordon Reid	(France) Stéphane Houdet (France) Nicolas Peifer	5–7, 6–3, [11–9]
Loss	2019	Wimbledon	Grass	(United Kingdom) Gordon Reid	(Belgium) Joachim Gérard (Sweden) Stefan Olsson	4–6, 2–6
Win	2019	US Open (3)	Hard	(United Kingdom) Gordon Reid	(Argentina) Gustavo Fernández (Japan) Shingo Kunieda	1–6, 6–4, [11–9]
Win	2020	Australian Open	Hard	(United Kingdom) Gordon Reid	(France) Stéphane Houdet (France) Nicolas Peifer	4–6, 6–4, [10–7]
Win	2020	US Open (4)	Hard	(United Kingdom) Gordon Reid	(France) Stéphane Houdet (France) Nicolas Peifer	6–4, 6–1
Win	2020	French Open	Clay	(United Kingdom) Gordon Reid	(Argentina) Gustavo Fernández (Japan) Shingo Kunieda	7–6^{(7–4)}, 1–6, [10–3]
Win	2021	Australian Open (2)	Hard	(United Kingdom) Gordon Reid	(France) Stéphane Houdet (France) Nicolas Peifer	7–5, 7–6^{(7–3)}
Win	2021	French Open (2)	Clay	(United Kingdom) Gordon Reid	(France) Stéphane Houdet (France) Nicolas Peifer	6-3, 6–0
Win	2021	Wimbledon (4)	Grass	(United Kingdom) Gordon Reid	(Netherlands) Tom Egberink (Belgium) Joachim Gerard	7–5, 6–2
Win	2021	US Open (5)	Hard	(United Kingdom) Gordon Reid	(Argentina) Gustavo Fernández (Japan) Shingo Kunieda	6-2, 6–1
Win	2022	Australian Open (3)	Hard	(United Kingdom) Gordon Reid	(Argentina) Gustavo Fernández (Japan) Shingo Kunieda	6–2, 4–6, [10–7]
Win	2022	French Open (3)	Clay	(United Kingdom) Gordon Reid	(Argentina) Gustavo Fernández (Japan) Shingo Kunieda	7–6^{(7–5)}, 7–6^{(7–5)}
Loss	2022	Wimbledon	Grass	(United Kingdom) Gordon Reid	(Argentina) Gustavo Fernández (Japan) Shingo Kunieda	3–6, 1–6
Loss	2022	US Open	Hard	(United Kingdom) Gordon Reid	(Spain) Martín de la Puente (France) Nicolas Peifer	6–4, 5–7, [6–10]
Win	2023	Australian Open (4)	Hard	(United Kingdom) Gordon Reid	(Netherlands) Maikel Scheffers (Netherlands) Ruben Spaargaren	6–1, 6–2
Win	2023	French Open (4)	Clay	(United Kingdom) Gordon Reid	(Spain) Martín de la Puente (Argentina) Gustavo Fernández	7–6^{(11–9)}, 7–5
Win	2023	Wimbledon (5)	Grass	(United Kingdom) Gordon Reid	(Japan) Takuya Miki (Japan) Tokito Oda	3–6, 6–0, 6–3
Win	2024	Australian Open (5)	Hard	(United Kingdom) Gordon Reid	(Japan) Takuya Miki (Japan) Tokito Oda	6–3, 6–2
Win	2024	French Open (5)	Clay	(United Kingdom) Gordon Reid	(Japan) Takuya Miki (Japan) Tokito Oda	6–1, 6–4
Win	2024	Wimbledon (6)	Grass	(United Kingdom) Gordon Reid	(Japan) Takuya Miki (Japan) Tokito Oda	6–4, 7–6^{(7–2)}
Win	2025	Australian Open (6)	Hard	(United Kingdom) Gordon Reid	(Spain) Daniel Caverzaschi (France) Stéphane Houdet	6–2, 6–4
Win	2024	French Open (6)	Clay	(United Kingdom) Gordon Reid	(France) Stéphane Houdet (Japan) Tokito Oda	6–4, 1–6, [10–7]
Loss	2025	Wimbledon	Grass	(United Kingdom) Gordon Reid	(Spain) Martín de la Puente (Netherlands) Ruben Spaargaren	7–6^{(7–1)}, 7–5
Win	2026	French Open (7)	Clay	(United Kingdom) Gordon Reid	(Spain) Martin de la Puenta (France) Stéphane Houdet	6–2, 6–3
Win	2026	Wimbledon (7)	Grass	(United Kingdom) Gordon Reid	(Argentina) Gustavo Fernández (Japan) Tokito Oda	2–6, 6–1, 6–2
