= 2020 French Open – Wheelchair men's doubles =

Wheelchair men's doubles
- 2020 French Open

Final
- Champion: (United Kingdom) Alfie Hewett (United Kingdom) Gordon Reid
- Runner-up: (Argentina) Gustavo Fernández (Japan) Shingo Kunieda
- Score: 7–6^{(7–4)}, 1–6, [10–3]

Events
| Singles | men | women | | boys | girls |
| Doubles | men | women | mixed | boys | girls |
| WC Singles | men | women | quad |
| WC Doubles | men | women | quad |
| Legends | −45 | 45+ | women |
- French Open

Alfie Hewett and Gordon Reid defeated the defending champions Gustavo Fernández and Shingo Kunieda in the final, 7–6^{(7–4)}, 1–6, [10–3] to win the men's doubles wheelchair tennis title at the 2020 French Open. With the win, Hewett completed the career Grand Slam.

== Seeds ==
1. (France) Stéphane Houdet / (France) Nicolas Peifer (semifinals)
2. (United Kingdom) Alfie Hewett / (United Kingdom) Gordon Reid (champions)

== Draw ==
Key

- Q = Qualifier
- WC = Wild card
- LL = Lucky loser
- Alt = Alternate
- ITF = ITF entry
- PR = Protected ranking
- SR = Special ranking
- SE = Special exempt
- JE = Junior exempt
- JR = Junior Accelerator Programme entrant
- CO = College Accelerator Programme entrant
- NG = Next Gen Accelerator Program entrant
- w/o = Walkover
- r = Retired
- d = Defaulted

=== Finals ===
Semifinals
1 | (France) Stéphane Houdet (France) Nicolas Peifer | 6 | 3 | [10]
(Argentina) Gustavo Fernández (Japan) Shingo Kunieda | 3 | 6 | [12]
(France) Frédéric Cattanéo (Belgium) Joachim Gérard | 3 | 6^{2}
2 | (United Kingdom) Alfie Hewett (United Kingdom) Gordon Reid | 6 | 7^{7}

Final
(Argentina) Gustavo Fernández (Japan) Shingo Kunieda | 6^{4} | 6 | [3]
2 | (United Kingdom) Alfie Hewett (United Kingdom) Gordon Reid | 7^{7} | 1 | [10]
