= Gordon Reid (tennis) =

British wheelchair tennis player

Gordon Reid OBE
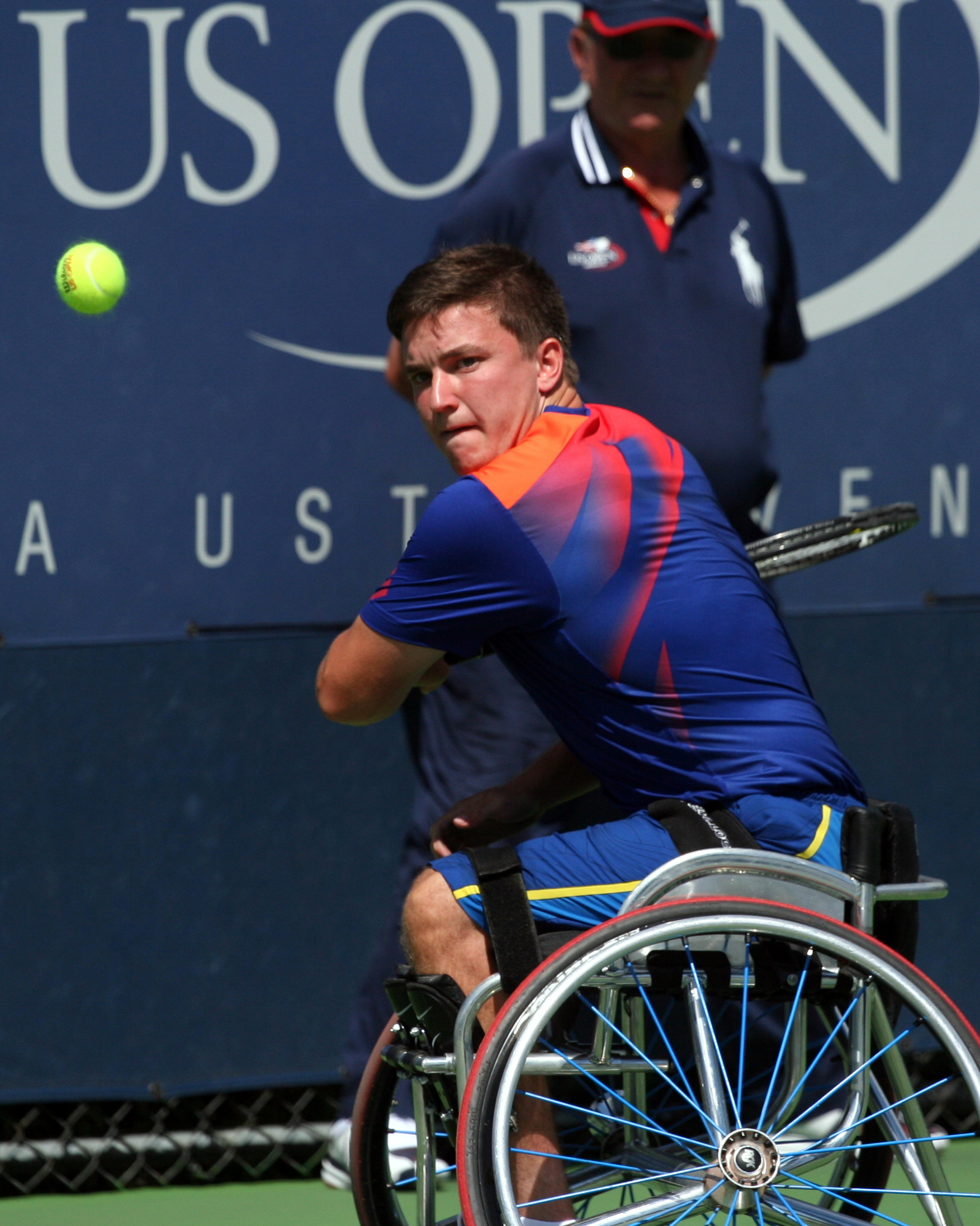
- Reid at the 2013 US Open
- Country (sports): Great Britain
- Residence: Glasgow, Scotland, United Kingdom
- Born: 2 October 1991 (age 35) Alexandria, Scotland, United Kingdom
- Height: 1.75 m (5 ft 9 in)
- Turned pro: 2012
- Plays: Left-handed

Singles
- Career record: 658-281 (70%)
- Career titles: 52
- Highest ranking: No. 1 (19 September 2016)
- Current ranking: No. 5 (06 June 2026)

Grand Slam singles results
- Australian Open: W (2016)
- French Open: F (2016, 2019)
- Wimbledon: W (2016)
- US Open: F (2023)

Other tournaments
- Masters: F (2016, 2017)
- Paralympic Games: Gold Medal (2016); Bronze Medal (2020)

Doubles
- Career record: 565-177 (76%)
- Career titles: 118
- Highest ranking: No. 1 (9 November 2015)
- Current ranking: No. 1 (06 June 2026)

Grand Slam doubles results
- Australian Open: W (2017, 2020, 2021, 2022, 2023, 2024, 2025)
- French Open: W (2015, 2016, 2020, 2021, 2022, 2023, 2024, 2025, 2026)
- Wimbledon: W (2016, 2017, 2018, 2021, 2023, 2024, 2026)
- US Open: W (2015, 2017, 2018, 2019, 2020, 2021, 2026)

Other doubles tournaments
- Masters Doubles: W (2013, 2015, 2017, 2021, 2023)
- Paralympic Games: Gold Medal (2024); Silver Medal (2016, 2020)
- Last updated on: 30 November 2024.

Gordon James Reid (born 2 October 1991) is a British professional wheelchair tennis player. He has been ranked world No. 1 in singles and is currently ranked world No. 1 in doubles. Reid has won two Paralympic gold medals, two silver medals, and one bronze medal, as well as a two major singles titles and a record 30 major doubles titles.

Reid's first appearance for Great Britain at the Summer Paralympics was when he was age sixteen at Beijing 2008. He later reached the quarterfinals in the singles in London 2012 as well as the quarterfinals in doubles. He won Paralympic gold in the men's singles event at Rio 2016 and silver in the doubles event with partner Alfie Hewett, whom he beat in the singles final. At Tokyo 2020, Reid won bronze in the singles and silver in the doubles with Hewett. The pair later went on to complete a calendar year Grand Slam, winning all four majors in 2021. At Paris 2024 he won his second gold medal, again partnering Hewett in the men's doubles. He currently holds the record for most doubles slam titles won by a wheelchair player in any division (men's, women's, and quads), with 30.

Reid was born able-bodied, and enjoyed a wide variety of sports as a child, including football and tennis. However, at the age of 12, he contracted a rare neurological condition called transverse myelitis which left him paralyzed from the waist down.

== Early life ==
Reid was born in Alexandria, West Dunbartonshire, on 2 October 1991. He comes from a tennis-playing family and started playing tennis at the age of six, alongside his two brothers and sister at Helensburgh Lawn Tennis Club, where he was a good junior player, before contracting rare spinal condition, transverse myelitis in 2004. He was paralysed from the waist down for over a decade but then gradually regained limited ability to stand and walk.

He first began playing wheelchair tennis in 2005, when he was introduced to the sport at Scotstoun Leisure Centre in Glasgow. He was acknowledged for his sporting credentials in 2006, when he was among the 10 shortlisted finalists for the BBC Young Sports Personality of the Year.

In 2007, Reid became Britain's youngest men's Singles National Champion and he was also part of Great Britain's winning junior team at the 2007 World Team Cup. He feels his greatest achievement was representing ParalympicsGB at the 2008 Beijing Paralympic Games when he was 16 years old.

When he was younger, Reid combined his training commitments with his studies and in 2009 he passed Highers in Maths, English and Biology after attending Hermitage Academy in Helensburgh, Argyll and Bute. He is a lifelong supporter of Rangers FC and regularly attends their home matches.

== Tennis career ==
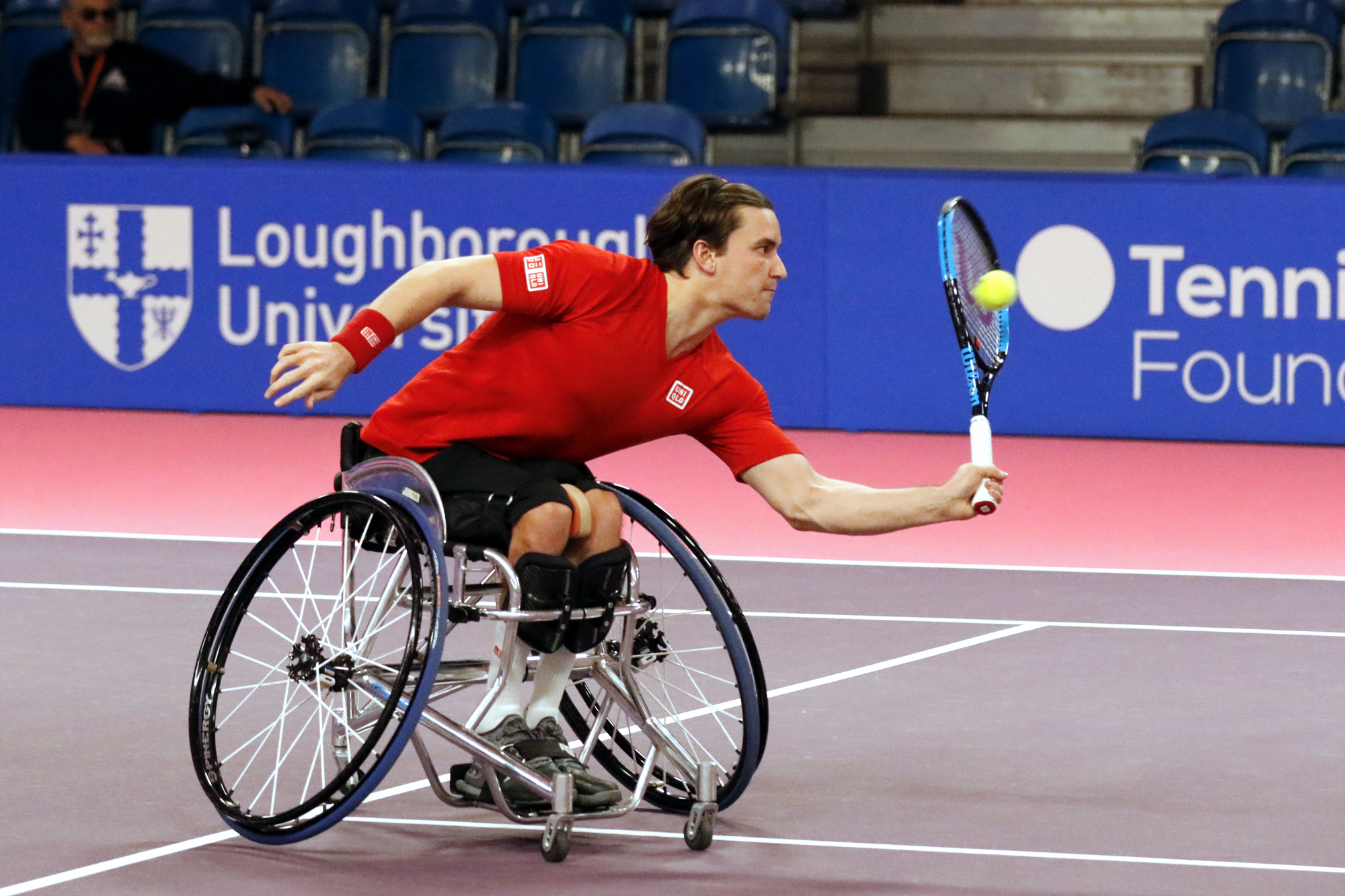
Gordon Reid at the 2017 NEC wheelchair tennis Masters

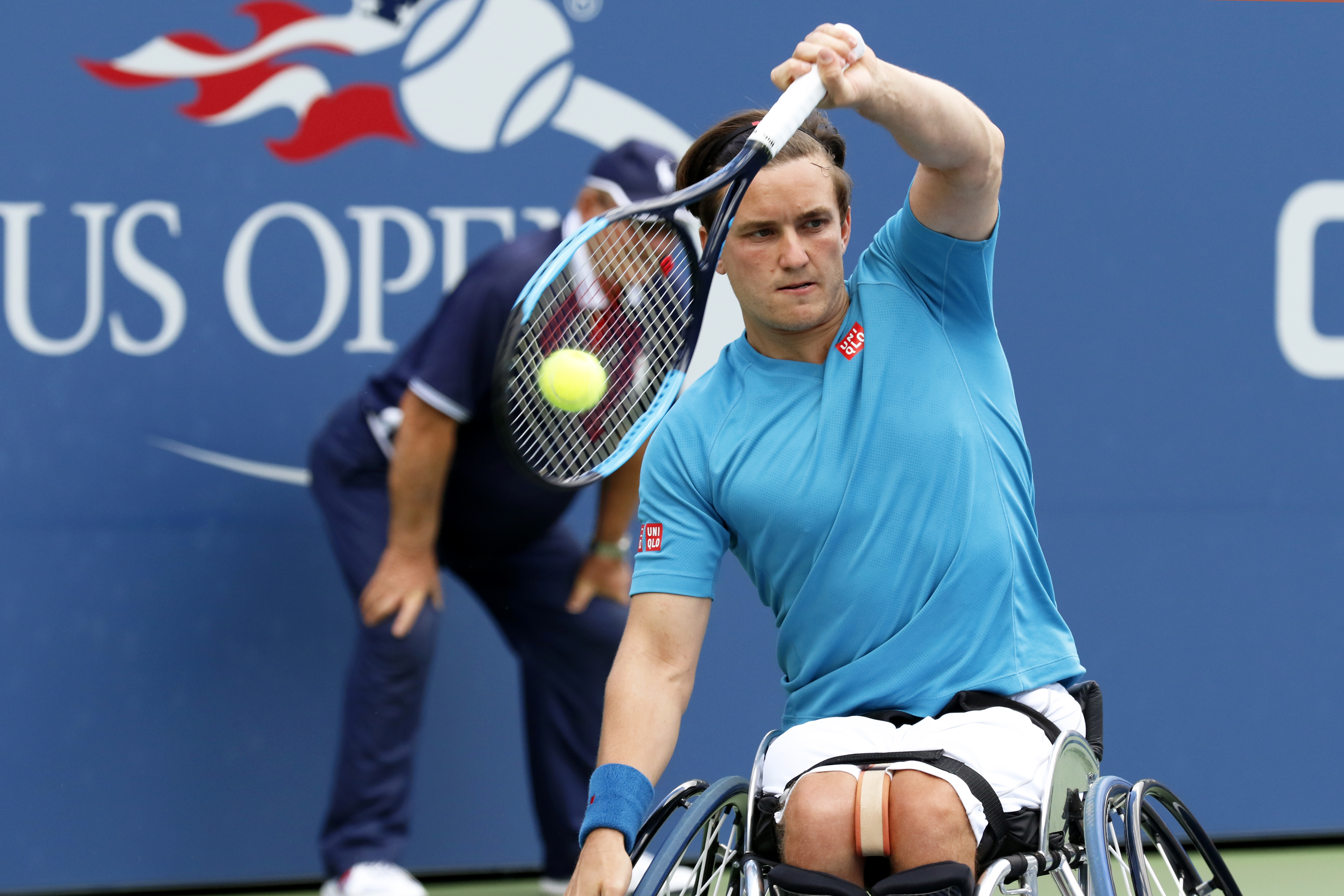
Gordon Reid at the 2017 US Open

Reid won his first wheelchair tennis title in April 2005, six weeks after coming out of hospital, when he won the B Division Singles at the Glasgow Wheelchair Tennis Tournament. He became Britain's youngest National champion at the age of 15 in 2007 and the youngest British men's No 1 shortly before his 18th birthday at the end of September 2008.

At the 2006 British Open he won both the Men's Second Draw Singles and Boys' Junior Singles and ended the year among the 10 shortlisted finalists for the 2006 BBC Young Sports Person of the Year.

In 2007 he won the boys' doubles at the Junior Masters in Tarbes, France and shortly afterwards won the men's singles at the 2007 North West Challenge in Preston to collect his first senior international NEC Wheelchair Tennis Tour singles title. He was undefeated as a member of the winning GB Junior team in the Junior event at the 2007 Invacare World Team Cup (Davis and Fed Cups of wheelchair tennis). In 2008 and 2009 he won both the boys' singles and boys' doubles at the Junior Masters in Tarbes, France and in January 2009 became world No 1 junior in the boys' singles rankings, a position he maintained throughout his final season as a junior. He helped Great Britain to win men's World Group 2 at the 2008 Invacare World Team Cup, to finish fifth in World Group 1 in 2009 and to finish fourth in Turkey in 2010, which was Britain's best Invacare World Team Cup result in the men's event since 2002.

Reid was named Tennis Scotland Junior Male Player of the Year in 2009 and Tennis Scotland Disabled Player of the Year in 2010. As a doubles player, he qualified for the year-end Doubles Masters for the first time in 2009, where he and his Hungarian partner Laszlo Farkas finished fifth of the eight partnerships. Reid also played in the men's wheelchair doubles at Wimbledon in 2008.

Reid ended 2010 having beaten three world top ranked players on his way to winning three NEC Tour singles titles during the season, as well as winning four doubles titles during the year. He beat Austrian world No 9 Martin Legner to win his last tournament of the season in December, the Prague Cup Czech Indoor.

In January 2016, Reid won his first ever Grand Slam singles wheelchair title at the Australian Open. In July 2016, Reid followed up with his second Grand Slam victory in the inaugural singles wheelchair championships at Wimbledon. At the 2016 Summer Paralympics Reid won the gold medal for the men's wheelchair singles tennis, beating fellow Briton Alfie Hewett in straight sets, 6–2, 6–1. He ended the year as world number one in singles.

He competed in wheelchair tennis at the 2020 Summer Paralympics, where he won silver in the doubles with Hewett and bronze in the singles.

After 2016, Reid's grand slam success continued primarily with his accolades in the doubles alongside Hewett. Together, they were the first men's wheelchair tennis pair to win the calendar year grand slam, which they completed in 2021. Their title at the Australian Open in 2022 marked their 9th consecutive victory in a slam, overtaking Martina Navratilova and Pam Shriver's record for most consecutive slam titles.

Reid kicked off 2024 by winning a fifth Australian Open doubles title in a row with Hewett. In May 2024 Reid was part of the Great Britain team which won the World Team Cup for a second successive year beating Spain 2–0 in the final of the event held in Turkey. It was the team's fourth win in the competition since 2015. Reid and Hewett won a fifth straight French Open in June with a 6-1 6–4 victory over second-seeded Japanese duo Takuya Miki and Tokito Oda in the final. At the 2024 Wimbledon Championships, Reid and Hewett won the doubles title for a sixth time, defeating Takuya Miki and Tokito Oda in the final, 6–4, 7–6^{(7–2)}. Reid gained his second paralympic gold medal at Paris 2024, winning in the doubles with Alfie Hewett. This marked his achievement of a career golden slam in the doubles, having won all four majors and the Paralympic gold medal.

== Personal life ==
Reid was appointed Member of the Order of the British Empire (MBE) in the 2017 New Year Honours for services to wheelchair tennis. After giving him his MBE, Queen Elizabeth II referred to him as a "charming young man". Reid was appointed Officer of the Order of the British Empire (OBE) in the 2023 Birthday Honours for services to tennis.

Reid enjoys playing wheelchair basketball recreationally. He and his doubles partner Alfie Hewett currently play for the Surrey 89ers wheelchair basketball team.

== Career statistics ==
=== Grand Slam performance timelines ===
Key
W	F	SF	QF	#R	RR	Q#	DNQ	A	NH

(W) winner; (F) finalist; (SF) semifinalist; (QF) quarterfinalist; (#R) rounds 4, 3, 2, 1; (RR) round-robin stage; (Q#) qualification round; (DNQ) did not qualify; (A) absent; (NH) not held; (SR) strike rate (events won / competed); (W–L) win–loss record.
To avoid confusion and double counting, these charts are updated at the conclusion of a tournament or when the player's participation has ended.

==== Wheelchair singles ====
Tournament	2013	2014	2015	2016	2017	2018	2019	2020	2021	2022	2023	2024	2025	2026	SR	W–L
Grand Slam tournaments
Australian Open	A	QF	QF	W	QF	QF	QF	F	SF	QF	QF	SF	QF	QF	1 / 13	–
French Open	SF	SF	QF	F	QF	QF	F	QF	QF	QF	QF	SF	QF	1R	0 / 14	
Wimbledon	NH	NH	NH	W	QF	QF	QF	NH	F	QF	SF	1R	QF	1R	1 / 10	–
US Open	SF	QF	QF	NH	SF	QF	QF	QF	SF	1R	F	NH	QF	QF	0 / 12	–
Win–loss	–	–	–	–	–	–	–	–	–	–	–	–	–	–	2 / 49	–

==== Wheelchair doubles ====
Tournament	2013	2014	2015	2016	2017	2018	2019	2020	2021	2022	2023	2024	2025	2026	SR	W–L
Grand Slam tournaments
Australian Open	A	F	F	F	W	F	SF	W	W	W	W	W	W	SF	7 / 13	–
French Open	F	SF	W	W	F	SF	SF	W	W	W	W	W	W	W	9 / 14	–
Wimbledon	4th	3rd	F	W	W	W	F	NH	W	F	W	W	F	W	7 / 13	–
US Open	SF	F	W	NH	W	W	W	W	W	F (Note: Reid received a walkover in the quarter-final of the 2022 US Open, which does not count as a win.)	SF	NH	F		6 / 11	–
Win–loss	–	–	–	–	–	–	–	–	–	–	–	–	–	–	29 / 51	–

=== Finals ===
==== Wheelchair singles: 7 (2 titles, 5 runner-ups) ====
Result	Year	Tournament	Surface	Opponent	Score
Win	2016	Australian Open	Hard	(Belgium) Joachim Gérard	7–6^{(9–7)}, 6–4
Loss	2016	French Open	Clay	(Argentina) Gustavo Fernández	6–7^{(1–7)}, 1–6
Win	2016	Wimbledon	Grass	(Sweden) Stefan Olsson	6–1, 6–4
Loss	2019	French Open (2)	Clay	(Argentina) Gustavo Fernández	1–6, 3–6
Loss	2020	Australian Open	Hard	(Japan) Shingo Kunieda	4–6, 4–6
Loss	2021	Wimbledon	Grass	(Belgium) Joachim Gérard	2–6, 6–7^{(2–7)}
Loss	2023	US Open	Hard	(United Kingdom) Alfie Hewett	4–6, 3–6

==== Wheelchair doubles: 37 (26 titles, 11 runner-ups) ====
Outcome	Year	Championship	Surface	Partner	Opponents	Score
Loss	2013	French Open	Clay	(Netherlands) Ronald Vink	(France) Stéphane Houdet (Japan) Shingo Kunieda	6–3, 4–6, [6–10]
Loss	2014	Australian Open	Hard	(Netherlands) Maikel Scheffers	(France) Stéphane Houdet (Japan) Shingo Kunieda	3–6, 3–6
Loss	2014	US Open	Hard	(Netherlands) Maikel Scheffers	(France) Stéphane Houdet (Japan) Shingo Kunieda	2–6, 6–2, 6–7^{(4–7)}
Loss	2015	Australian Open	Hard	(Argentina) Gustavo Fernández	(France) Stéphane Houdet (Japan) Shingo Kunieda	2–6, 1–6
Win	2015	French Open	Clay	(Japan) Shingo Kunieda	(Argentina) Gustavo Fernández (France) Nicolas Peifer	6–1, 7–6^{(7–1)}
Loss	2015	Wimbledon	Grass	(France) Michaël Jeremiasz	(Argentina) Gustavo Fernández (France) Nicolas Peifer	5–7, 7–5, 2–6
Win	2015	US Open	Hard	(France) Stéphane Houdet	(France) Michaël Jeremiasz (France) Nicolas Peifer	6–3, 6–1
Loss	2016	Australian Open	Hard	(Japan) Shingo Kunieda	(France) Stéphane Houdet (France) Nicolas Peifer	3–6, 6–3, 5–7
Win	2016	French Open (2)	Clay	(Japan) Shingo Kunieda	(France) Michaël Jeremiasz (Sweden) Stefan Olsson	6–3, 6–2
Win	2016	Wimbledon	Grass	(United Kingdom) Alfie Hewett	(France) Stéphane Houdet (France) Nicolas Peifer	4–6, 6–1, 7–6^{(8–6)}
Win	2017	Australian Open	Hard	(Belgium) Joachim Gérard	(Argentina) Gustavo Fernández (United Kingdom) Alfie Hewett	6–3, 3–6, [10–3]
Loss	2017	French Open	Clay	(United Kingdom) Alfie Hewett	(France) Stéphane Houdet (France) Nicolas Peifer	4–6, 3–6
Win	2017	Wimbledon (2)	Grass	(United Kingdom) Alfie Hewett	(France) Stéphane Houdet (France) Nicolas Peifer	6–7^{(5–7)}, 7–5, 7–6^{(7–3)}
Win	2017	US Open (2)	Hard	(United Kingdom) Alfie Hewett	(France) Stéphane Houdet (France) Nicolas Peifer	7–5, 6–4
Loss	2018	Australian Open	Hard	(United Kingdom) Alfie Hewett	(France) Stéphane Houdet (France) Nicolas Peifer	4–6, 2–6
Win	2018	Wimbledon (3)	Grass	(United Kingdom) Alfie Hewett	(Belgium) Joachim Gérard (Sweden) Stefan Olsson	6–1, 6–4
Win	2018	US Open (3)	Hard	(United Kingdom) Alfie Hewett	(France) Stéphane Houdet (France) Nicolas Peifer	5–7, 6–3, [11–9]
Loss	2019	Wimbledon	Grass	(United Kingdom) Alfie Hewett	(Belgium) Joachim Gérard (Sweden) Stefan Olsson	4–6, 2–6
Win	2019	US Open (4)	Hard	(United Kingdom) Alfie Hewett	(Argentina) Gustavo Fernández (Japan) Shingo Kunieda	1–6, 6–4, [11–9]
Win	2020	Australian Open (2)	Hard	(United Kingdom) Alfie Hewett	(France) Stéphane Houdet (France) Nicolas Peifer	4–6, 6–4, [10–7]
Win	2020	US Open (5)	Hard	(United Kingdom) Alfie Hewett	(France) Stéphane Houdet (France) Nicolas Peifer	6–4, 6–1
Win	2020	French Open (3)	Clay	(United Kingdom) Alfie Hewett	(Argentina) Gustavo Fernández (Japan) Shingo Kunieda	7–6^{(7–4)}, 1–6, [10–3]
Win	2021	Australian Open (3)	Hard	(United Kingdom) Alfie Hewett	(France) Stéphane Houdet (France) Nicolas Peifer	7–5, 7–6^{(7–3)}
Win	2021	French Open (4)	Clay	(United Kingdom) Alfie Hewett	(France) Stéphane Houdet (France) Nicolas Peifer	6-3, 6–0
Win	2021	Wimbledon (4)	Grass	(United Kingdom) Alfie Hewett	(Netherlands) Tom Egberink (Belgium) Joachim Gerard	7–5, 6–2
Win	2021	US Open (6)	Hard	(United Kingdom) Alfie Hewett	(Argentina) Gustavo Fernández (Japan) Shingo Kunieda	6-2, 6–1
Win	2022	Australian Open (4)	Hard	(United Kingdom) Alfie Hewett	(Argentina) Gustavo Fernández (Japan) Shingo Kunieda	6–2, 4–6, [10–7]
Win	2022	French Open (5)	Clay	(United Kingdom) Alfie Hewett	(Argentina) Gustavo Fernández (Japan) Shingo Kunieda	7–6^{(7–5)}, 7–6^{(7–5)}
Loss	2022	Wimbledon	Grass	(United Kingdom) Alfie Hewett	(Argentina) Gustavo Fernández (Japan) Shingo Kunieda	3–6, 1–6
Loss	2022	US Open	Hard	(United Kingdom) Alfie Hewett	(Spain) Martín de la Puente (France) Nicolas Peifer	6–4, 5–7, [6–10]
Win	2023	Australian Open (5)	Hard	(United Kingdom) Alfie Hewett	(Netherlands) Maikel Scheffers (Netherlands) Ruben Spaargaren	6–1, 6–2
Win	2023	French Open (6)	Clay	(United Kingdom) Alfie Hewett	(Spain) Martín de la Puente (Argentina) Gustavo Fernández	7–6^{(11–9)}, 7–5
Win	2023	Wimbledon (5)	Grass	(United Kingdom) Alfie Hewett	(Japan) Takuya Miki (Japan) Tokito Oda	3–6, 6–0, 6–3
Win	2024	Australian Open (6)	Hard	(United Kingdom) Alfie Hewett	(Japan) Takuya Miki (Japan) Tokito Oda	6–3, 6–2
Win	2024	French Open (7)	Clay	(United Kingdom) Alfie Hewett	(Japan) Takuya Miki (Japan) Tokito Oda	6–1, 6–4
Win	2024	Wimbledon (6)	Grass	(United Kingdom) Alfie Hewett	(Japan) Takuya Miki (Japan) Tokito Oda	6-4, 7–6^{(7–2)}
Win	2026	Wimbledon(7)	Grass	(United Kingdom) Alfie Hewett	(Argentina) Gustavo Fernández (Japan) Tokito Oda	2–6, 6–1, 6–2

Awards and achievements
Preceded by (Japan) Shingo Kunieda	ITF Wheelchair Tennis World Champion; 2016	Succeeded by Incumbent
