= 2021 Australian Open – Wheelchair men's singles =

Wheelchair men's singles
- 2021 Australian Open

Final
- Champion: (Belgium) Joachim Gérard
- Runner-up: (United Kingdom) Alfie Hewett
- Score: 6–0, 4–6, 6–4

Events
Singles	men	women		boys	girls
Doubles	men	women	mixed	boys	girls
WC Singles	men	women	quad
WC Doubles	men	women	quad
Legends	men	women	mixed
- Australian Open

Joachim Gérard defeated Alfie Hewett in the final, 6–0, 4–6, 6–4 to win the men's singles wheelchair tennis title at the 2021 Australian Open.

Shingo Kunieda was the defending champion, but was defeated by Hewett in the semifinals.

== Seeds ==
1. (Japan) Shingo Kunieda (semifinals)
2. (Argentina) Gustavo Fernández (quarterfinals)

== Draw ==
Key

- Q = Qualifier
- WC = Wild card
- LL = Lucky loser
- Alt = Alternate
- ITF = ITF entry
- PR = Protected ranking
- SR = Special ranking
- SE = Special exempt
- JE = Junior exempt
- JR = Junior Accelerator Programme entrant
- CO = College Accelerator Programme entrant
- NG = Next Gen Accelerator Program entrant
- w/o = Walkover
- r = Retired
- d = Defaulted

=== Bracket ===
Quarterfinals
1	(Japan) Shingo Kunieda	6	6
WC	(Australia) Ben Weekes	0	1
(United Kingdom) Alfie Hewett	7	6
(France) Nicolas Peifer	5	3
(France) Stéphane Houdet	3	6^{8}
(Belgium) Joachim Gérard	6	7^{10}
(United Kingdom) Gordon Reid	5	6	6
2	(Argentina) Gustavo Fernández	7	4	4

Semifinals
1	(Japan) Shingo Kunieda	3	4
(United Kingdom) Alfie Hewett	6	6
(Belgium) Joachim Gérard	4	7	6
(United Kingdom) Gordon Reid	6	5	3

Final
(United Kingdom) Alfie Hewett	0	6	4
(Belgium) Joachim Gérard	6	4	6
