= 2021 Australian Open – Wheelchair men's doubles =

Wheelchair men's doubles
- 2021 Australian Open

Final
- Champions: (United Kingdom) Alfie Hewett (United Kingdom) Gordon Reid
- Runners-up: (France) Stéphane Houdet (France) Nicolas Peifer
- Score: 7–5, 7–6^{(7–3)}

Events
Singles	men	women		boys	girls
Doubles	men	women	mixed	boys	girls
WC Singles	men	women	quad
WC Doubles	men	women	quad
Legends	men	women	mixed
← 2020 ·	Australian Open	· 2022 →

Defending champions Alfie Hewett and Gordon Reid defeated Stéphane Houdet and Nicolas Peifer in the final, 7–5, 7–6^{(7–3)} to win the men's doubles wheelchair tennis title at the 2021 Australian Open. It was their first step towards a Grand Slam.

== Seeds ==
1. (United Kingdom) Alfie Hewett / (United Kingdom) Gordon Reid (champions)
2. (France) Stéphane Houdet / (France) Nicolas Peifer (final)

== Draw ==
=== Key ===
- Q = Qualifier
- WC = Wild card
- LL = Lucky loser
- Alt = Alternate
- ITF = ITF entry
- PR = Protected ranking
- SR = Special ranking
- SE = Special exempt
- JE = Junior exempt
- JR = Junior Accelerator Programme entrant
- CO = College Accelerator Programme entrant
- NG = Next Gen Accelerator Program entrant
- w/o = Walkover
- r = Retired
- d = Defaulted

=== Bracket ===
Semifinals
1	(United Kingdom) Alfie Hewett (United Kingdom) Gordon Reid	6	4	[10]
(Argentina) Gustavo Fernández (Japan) Shingo Kunieda	1	6	[7]
(Belgium) Joachim Gérard (Australia) Ben Weekes	4	2
2	(France) Stéphane Houdet (France) Nicolas Peifer	6	6

Final
1	(United Kingdom) Alfie Hewett (United Kingdom) Gordon Reid	7	7^{7}
2	(France) Stéphane Houdet (France) Nicolas Peifer	5	6^{3}
