= Joachim Gérard =

Belgian wheelchair tennis player

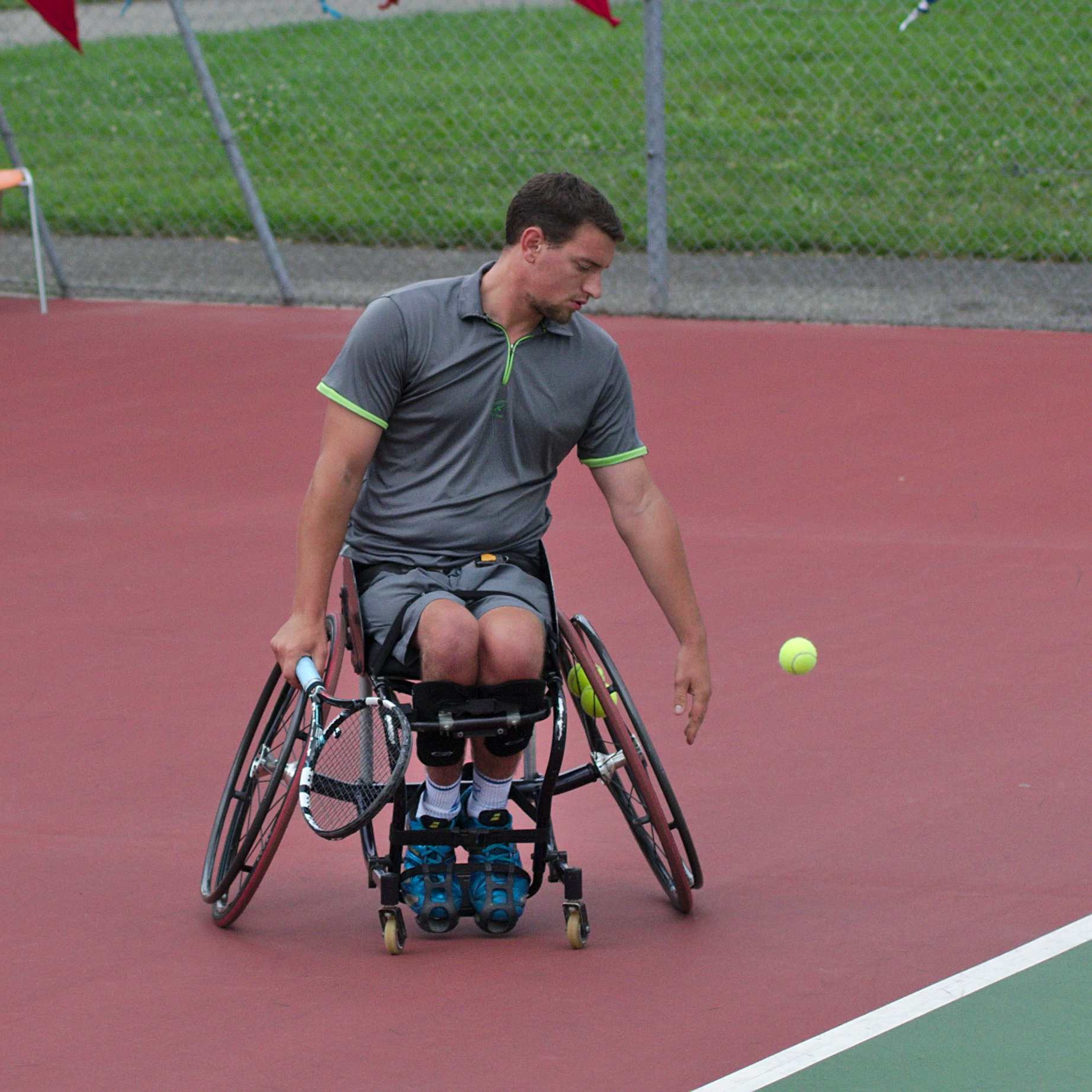
- Country (sports): Belgium
- Born: 15 October 1988 (age 37) Limelette, Belgium
- Plays: Right-handed (one-handed backhand)

Singles
- Career record: 662–290
- Highest ranking: No. 1 (5 December 2016)
- Current ranking: No. 8 (20 January 2025)

Grand Slam singles results
- Australian Open: W (2021)
- French Open: F (2020)
- Wimbledon: W (2021)
- US Open: SF (2015, 2020)

Other tournaments
- Masters: W (2015, 2016, 2018, 2019)
- Paralympic Games: Bronze Medal (2016)

Doubles
- Career record: 455–271
- Highest ranking: No. 3 (17 November 2014)
- Current ranking: No. 7 (20 January 2025)

Grand Slam doubles results
- Australian Open: W (2017, 2019)
- French Open: W (2014)
- Wimbledon: W (2019)
- US Open: F (2013)

Other doubles tournaments
- Masters Doubles: W (2014, 2024)
- Paralympic Games: QF (2020)
- Last updated on: 22 January 2025.

Joachim Gérard (born 15 October 1988) is a Belgian wheelchair tennis player. He has been ranked world No. 1 in singles.

Gérard has won two Grand Slam singles titles (2021 Australian Open, 2021 Wimbledon Championships) and four doubles titles (2014 French Open, 2017 Australian Open, 2019 Australian Open and 2019 Wimbledon Championships).

Gérard has also won the singles title at the Wheelchair Tennis Masters in 2015, 2016, 2018 and 2019, as well as the doubles title in 2014.

He competed in wheelchair tennis at the 2016 and 2020, earning a bronze medal in singles during the former.

== Grand Slam performance timelines ==
Key
W	F	SF	QF	#R	RR	Q#	DNQ	A	NH

(W) winner; (F) finalist; (SF) semifinalist; (QF) quarterfinalist; (#R) rounds 4, 3, 2, 1; (RR) round-robin stage; (Q#) qualification round; (DNQ) did not qualify; (A) absent; (NH) not held; (SR) strike rate (events won / competed); (W–L) win–loss record.
To avoid confusion and double counting, these charts are updated at the conclusion of a tournament or when the player's participation has ended.

=== Wheelchair singles ===
Tournament	2013	2014	2015	2016	2017	2018	2019	2020	2021	2022	2023	2024	2025	2026	SR	W–L	Win %
Australian Open	A	QF	SF	F	SF	A	QF	SF	W	QF	1R	SF	1R	A	1 / 11	10–10	50%
French Open	A	QF	QF	QF	A	A	QF	F	QF	1R	QF	1R	1R	A	0 / 10	3–10	23%
Wimbledon	NH	NH	NH	SF	A	SF	QF	NH	W	SF	1R	QF	1R	A	1 / 8	7–7	50%
US Open	QF	QF	SF	NH	QF	QF	QF	SF	A	1R	1R	NH	A	A	0 / 9	2–9	18%
Win–loss	0–1	0–3	2–3	3–3	1–2	1–2	0–4	4–3	6–1	1–4	1–4	3–3	0–3	0–0	2 / 38	22–36	38%

=== Wheelchair doubles ===
Tournament	2013	2014	2015	2016	2017	2018	2019	2020	2021	2022	2023	2024	2025	SR	W–L	Win %
Australian Open	A	SF	SF	SF	W	A	W	SF	SF	SF	QF	SF	QF	2 / 11	5–9	36%
French Open	A	W	SF	SF	A	A	SF	SF	SF	QF	SF	QF	QF	1 / 9	3–8	27%
Wimbledon	A	SF	SF	SF	A	F	W	NH	F	SF	SF	QF	QF	1 / 9	4–8	33%
US Open	F	SF	SF	NH	SF	SF	SF	SF	A	SF	QF	NH	A	0 / 9	2–9	18%
Win–loss	1–1	2–3	0–4	0–3	2–1	1–2	4–2	0–3	1–3	1–4	1–4	1–3	0-3	4 / 38	14–34	29%

== Awards ==
Belgian Paralympic Athlete of the Year (2013 & 2019)
