= List of Australian television ratings for 2021 =

The following is a list of Australian television ratings for the year 2021.

== Network shares ==
Market	Network shares
Market	ABC	Seven	Nine	Ten	SBS
5 cities	17.0%	29.5%	27.5%	17.6%	8.4%
Sydney
Melbourne
Brisbane
Adelaide
Perth

== Most watched broadcasts in 2021 ==
Rank	Broadcast	Genre	Origin	Date	Network	Audience
1	2021 AFL Grand Final	Sport	(Australia)	25 September 2021	7	3,051,000
2	2021 AFL Grand Final: Presentations	Sport	(Australia)	25 September 2021	7	2,713,000
3	2020 Tokyo Olympics opening ceremony	Sport	(Japan)	23 July 2021	7	2,654,000
4	2021 AFL Grand Final – On The Ground	Sport	(Australia)	25 September 2021	7	2,280,000
5	2021 NRL Grand Final	Sport	(Australia)	3 October 2021	9	2,206,000
6	2020 Tokyo Olympics Day 9 — Night	Sport	(Japan)	1 August 2021	7	2,077,000
7	2021 State of Origin (Rugby League) — Match 1	Sport	(Australia)	9 June 2021	9	1,933,000
8	The Block 2021 – Winner Announced	Reality	(Australia)	7 November 2021	9	1,907,000
9	2021 State of Origin (Rugby League) — Match 2	Sport	(Australia)	17 June 2021	9	1,873,000
10	2020 Tokyo Olympics opening ceremony — Late	Sport	(Japan)	23 July 2021	7	1,815,000
11	2021 NRL Grand Final — Presentation	Sport	(Australia)	3 October 2021	9	1,797,000
12	2020 Tokyo Olympics Day 12 — Night	Sport	(Japan)	4 August 2021	7	1,795,000
13	2021 State of Origin (Rugby League) — Match 3	Sport	(Australia)	14 July 2021	9	1,742,000
14	2020 Tokyo Olympics Day 8 — Night	Sport	(Japan)	31 July 2021	7	1,703,000
15	2020 Tokyo Olympics — Countdown to opening ceremony	Sport	(Japan)	23 July 2021	7	1,665,000
16	The Block 2021 – Grand Final	Reality	(Australia)	7 November 2021	9	1,610,000
17	2020 Tokyo Olympics Day 2 — Night	Sport	(Japan)	25 July 2021	7	1,591,000
18	Wimbledon Championships (Women's Singles Finals)	Sport	(United Kingdom)	10 July 2021	9	1,547,000
19	2020 Tokyo Olympics Day 9 — Afternoon	Sport	(Japan)	1 August 2021	7	1,529,000
20	2020 Tokyo Olympics Day 9 — Evening	Sport	(Japan)	1 August 2021	7	1,524,000

== Weekly ratings ==
- From the week beginning, 7 February 2021.

Week	Network shares					Top programs
Week	ABC	Seven	Nine	Ten	SBS	Top programs
7	17.2%	25.8%	32.2%	16.8%	8.0%	Nine Network – 2021 Australian Open Day 5 – Night (1,098,000); Seven Network – Seven News (955,000); Seven Network – Seven News (922,000); Seven Network – Seven News (914,000); Nine Network – Nine News (899,000)
8	17.8%	25.3%	22.0%	17.9%	8.3%	Seven Network – Seven News (988,000); Seven Network – Seven News (971,000); Seven Network – Seven News (938,000); Nine Network – Nine News (914,000); Nine Network – 2021 Australian Open Day 8 – Night (879,000)
9	17.7%	24.7%	31.9%	17.5%	8.2%	Nine Network – 2021 Australian Open – Men's Final (1,173,000); Nine Network – Married at First Sight (991,000); Seven Network – Seven News (978,000); Nine Network – Married at First Sight Launch (962,000); Nine Network – Married at First Sight (892,000)
10	19.0%	25.1%	30.6%	17.1%	8.2%	Nine Network – Married at First Sight (1,022,000); Nine Network – Married at First Sight (948,000); Nine Network – Married at First Sight (932,000); Nine Network – Married at First Sight (899,000); Seven Network – Seven News (875,000)
11	17.8%	24.7%	30.2%	19.5%	7.8%	Network Ten – Oprah with Meghan and Harry (1,366,000); Nine Network – Married at First Sight (970,000); Nine Network – Married at First Sight (948,000); Nine Network – Married at First Sight (944,000); Seven Network – Seven News (911,000)
12	17.6%	27.5%	30.4%	16.4%	8.1%	Nine Network – Married at First Sight (1,096,000); Nine Network – Married at First Sight (1,030,000); Nine Network – Married at First Sight (1,027,000); Nine Network – Married at First Sight (982,000); Nine Network – Nine News (945,000)
13	18.1%	27.5%	30.3%	16.3%	7.8%	Nine Network – Married at First Sight (1,116,000); Seven Network – Seven News (1,094,000); Seven Network – Seven News (1,077,000); Nine Network – Nine News (1,071,000); Nine Network – Married at First Sight (1,049,000)
14	17.6%	26.1%	31.3%	16.5%	8.5%	Nine Network – Married at First Sight (1,106,000); Nine Network – Married at First Sight (1,065,000); Nine Network – Married at First Sight (1,031,000); Nine Network – Married at First Sight (1,003,000); Seven Network – Seven News (982,000)
15	16.9%	27.4%	30.8%	16.8%	8.1%	Nine Network – Married at First Sight (1,121,000); Nine Network – Married at First Sight (1,100,000); Nine Network – Married at First Sight (1,009,000); Seven Network – Seven News (952,000); Nine Network – Nine News (912,000)
16	16.9%	29.2%	30.9%	15.4%	7.5%	Nine Network – Married at First Sight Final Dinner Party (1,134,000); Nine Network – Married at First Sight (1,127,000); Nine Network – Married at First Sight (1,093,000); Seven Network – Seven News (1,085,000); Nine Network – Married at First Sight (1,032,000)
17	16.2%	28.5%	28.9%	18.6%	7.7%	Nine Network – Married at First Sight finale (1,398,000); Seven Network – Seven News (1,038,000); Nine Network – Nine News (1,021,000); Seven Network – Seven News (970,000); Seven Network – Seven News (949,000)
18	16.1%	30.0%	27.5%	18.4%	8.0%	Seven Network – Seven News (1,151,000); Seven Network – Seven News (973,000); Seven Network – Seven News (962,000); Nine Network – Nine News (937,000); Nine Network – Nine News (929,000)
19	16.1%	28.7%	28.0%	19.1%	8.2%	Seven Network – Seven News (1,018,000); Nine Network – Nine News (1,009,000); Seven Network – Seven News (959,000); Seven Network – Seven News (948,000); Nine Network – Nine News (937,000)
20	15.5%	30.0%	27.2%	19.1%	8.3%	Seven Network – Seven News (1,027,000); Seven Network – Seven News (976,000); Seven Network – Seven News (932,000); Nine Network – Nine News (931,000); Nine Network – Nine News (913,000)
21	16.1%	29.1%	27.8%	18.8%	8.1%	Seven Network – Seven News (1,077,000); Nine Network – Lego Masters Winner Announced (1,001,000); Seven Network – Seven News (958,000); Nine Network – Nine News (941,000); Nine Network – Lego Masters final (933,000)
22	16.6%	29.0%	27.2%	18.7%	8.4%	Seven Network – Seven News (1,040,000); Nine Network – Nine News (1,018,000); Seven Network – Seven News (998,000); Seven Network – Seven News (991,000); Nine Network – Nine News (969,000)
23	15.7%	30.8%	26.5%	18.8%	8.2%	Seven Network – Seven News (1,182,000); Nine Network – Nine News (1,139,000); Nine Network – Nine News (1,029,000); Seven Network – Seven News (1,027,000); Seven Network – Seven News (984,000)
24	15.7%	29.3%	29.1%	17.9%	7.9%	Nine Network – 2021 State of Origin — Match 1 (1,911,000); Nine Network – 2021 State of Origin — Pre-Match (1,084,000); Seven Network – Seven News (1,064,000); Seven Network – Seven News (1,061,000); Nine Network – Nine News (1,026,000)
25	17.2%	29.7%	27.0%	18.3%	7.8%	Seven Network – Seven News (1,082,000); Seven Network – Seven News (1,023,000); Nine Network – Nine News (956,000); Nine Network – Nine News (950,000); Seven Network – Seven News (936,000)
26	15.7%	30.4%	27.7%	18.4%	7.8%	Nine Network – Nine News (1,071,000); Seven Network – Seven News (1,070,000); Seven Network – Seven News (1,046,000); Seven Network – Seven News (1,042,000); Seven Network – Seven News (1,012,000)
27	15.6%	28.9%	30.2%	17.0%	8.4%	Nine Network – 2021 State of Origin — Match 2 (1,862,000); Seven Network – Seven News (1,196,000); Seven Network – Seven News (1,164,000); Nine Network – Nine News (1,158,000); Nine Network – Nine News (1,123,000)
28	14.6%	28.7%	21.0%	16.7%	8.9%	Nine Network – 2021 Wimbledon Championships – Day 12 Late (1,393,000); Seven Network – Seven News (1,187,000); Seven Network – Seven News (1,136,000); Nine Network – Nine News (1,100,000); Seven Network – Seven News (1,072,000)
29	15.5%	28.8%	29.1%	18.1%	8.5%	Nine Network – 2021 State of Origin — Match 3 (1,739,000); Nine Network – Nine News (1,233,000); Seven Network – Seven News (1,178,000); Seven Network – Seven News (1,131,000); Nine Network – Nine News (1,094,000)
30	14.0%	39.5%	22.7%	17.1%	6.7%	Seven Network – 2020 Tokyo Olympics opening ceremony (2,117,000); Seven Network – 2020 Tokyo Olympics – Countdown to opening ceremony (1,640,000); Seven Network – Seven News (1,349,000); Seven Network – 2020 Tokyo Olympics Day 1 – Night (1,328,000); Seven Network – 2020 Tokyo Olympics Day 1 – Evening (1,257,000)
31	11.4%	49.8%	19.9%	13.6%	5.3%	Seven Network – 2020 Tokyo Olympics Day 8 – Night (1,699,000); Seven Network – 2020 Tokyo Olympics Day 2 – Night (1,585,000); Seven Network – Seven News (1,553,000); Seven Network – Seven News (1,496,000); Seven Network – 2020 Tokyo Olympics Day 2 – Evening (1,407,000)
32	10.8%	53.0%	18.8%	12.7%	4.6%	Seven Network – 2020 Tokyo Olympics Day 9 – Night (2,070,000); Seven Network – 2020 Tokyo Olympics Day 12 – Night (1,791,000); Seven Network – Seven News (1,742,000); Seven Network – 2020 Tokyo Olympics Day 9 – Afternoon (1,524,000); Seven Network – 2020 Tokyo Olympics Day 9 – Evening (1,519,000)
33	15.0%	34.5%	25.8%	17.5%	7.1%	Seven Network – Seven News (1,520,000); Seven Network – The Voice launch (1,329,000); Seven Network – 2020 Tokyo Olympics – Countdown to closing ceremony (1,245,000); Seven Network – 2020 Tokyo Olympics closing ceremony (1,215,000); Seven Network – Seven News (1,164,000)
34	16.7%	31.6%	26.2%	18.0%	7.5%	Seven Network – Seven News (1,267,000); Seven Network – The Voice (1,226,000); Nine Network – Nine News (1,171,000); Seven Network – Seven News (1,167,000); Seven Network – The Voice (1,165,000)
35	14.8%	35.5%	25.4%	17.0%	7.4%	Seven Network – Seven News (1,282,000); Seven Network – The Voice (1,177,000); Nine Network – Nine News (1,165,000); Seven Network – Seven News (1,149,000); Seven Network – The Voice (1,113,000)
36	14.9%	34.4%	26.6%	17.1%	7.1%	Seven Network – Seven News (1,338,000); Seven Network – The Voice (1,167,000); Nine Network – Nine News (1,126,000); Seven Network – Seven News (1,118,000); Seven Network – Seven News (1,076,000)
37	14.9%	31.4%	28.5%	17.6%	7.6%	Seven Network – Seven News (1,139,000); Nine Network – Nine News (1,112,000); Seven Network – The Voice (1,088,000); Seven Network – Seven News (1,078,000); Seven Network – Seven News (1,074,000)
38	15.4%	29.1%	29.3%	18.3%	7.9%	Seven Network – The Voice Grand Final – Winner Announced (1,383,000); Seven Network – The Voice Grand Final (1,292,000); Nine Network – Nine News (1,225,000); Seven Network – Seven News (1,113,000); Seven Network – Seven News (1,106,000)
39	14.2%	35.8%	27.1%	15.9%	7.0%	Seven Network – 2021 AFL Grand Final (3,006,000); Seven Network – 2021 AFL Grand Final: Presentations (2,667,000); Seven Network – 2021 AFL Grand Final: On The Ground (2,266,000); Nine Network – 2021 AFL Grand Final: Pre-Match Entertainment (1,464,000); Nine Network – 2021 AFL Grand Final: Post Match (1,275,000)
40	16.7%	27.3%	29.5%	18.1%	8.3%	Seven Network – Seven News (1,110,000); Seven Network – Seven News (1,083,000); Nine Network – The Block (1,075,000); Nine Network – Nine News (1,046,000); Seven Network – Seven News (1,043,000)
41	15.8%	24.8%	33.6%	17.3%	8.6%	Nine Network – 2021 NRL Grand Final (2,202,000); Nine Network – 2021 AFL Grand Final: Presentations (1,794,000); Nine Network – 2021 NRL Grand Final – Entertainment (1,020,000); Seven Network – Seven News (1,000,000); Nine Network – The Block (995,000)
42	16.1%	29.6%	28.2%	17.7%	8.4%	Seven Network – Hey Hey It's 50 Years (1,224,000); Seven Network – Seven News (1,040,000); Nine Network – Nine News (996,000); Seven Network – Seven News (984,000); Seven Network – Seven News (962,000)
43	16.6%	25.9%	30.6%	18.9%	8.0%	Nine Network – The Block (1,064,000); Nine Network – Nine News (1,034,000); Seven Network – Seven News (970,000); Nine Network – The Block (956,000); Seven Network – Seven News (947,000)
44	16.4%	25.5%	31.4%	18.2%	8.6%	Nine Network – The Block (1,101,000); Seven Network – Seven News (947,000); Nine Network – The Block (943,000); Seven Network – Seven News (942,000); Seven Network – Seven News (922,000)
45	16.9%	26.0%	31.4%	17.7%	8.0%	Network Ten – 2021 Melbourne Cup Carnival — Race (1,213,000); Nine Network – The Block (1,086,000); Seven Network – Seven News (932,000); Network Ten – 2021 Melbourne Cup Carnival – Presentation (897,000); Seven Network – Seven News (891,000)
46	16.3%	26.4%	32.4%	17.4%	7.4%	Nine Network – The Block — Winner Announced (1,835,000); Nine Network – The Block – Grand Final (1,555,000); Nine Network – Nine News (997,000); Seven Network – Seven News (904,000); Seven Network – Seven News (896,000)
47	17.3%	28.0%	28.1%	17.9%	8.8%	Nine Network – Nine News (888,000); Seven Network – Seven News (875,000); Seven Network – Seven News (874,000); Seven Network – Seven News (860,000); Nine Network – Nine News (908,000)
48	17.3%	28.1%	29.1%	16.8%	8.7%	Seven Network – Seven News (961,000); Seven Network – Seven News (944,000); Seven Network – Seven News (941,000); Nine Network – Nine News (920,000); Seven Network – Seven News (917,000)

== Weekly key demographics ==
- From the week beginning, 7 February 2021.

Week	16-39	18-49	25-54
7	TBC	TBC	TBC
8	TBC	TBC	TBC
9	TBC	TBC	TBC
10	TBC	TBC	TBC

== Key demographics shares ==
Network	16-39	18-49	25-54
ABC	TBC	TBC	TBC
Seven	TBC	TBC	TBC
Nine	TBC	TBC	TBC
Ten	TBC	TBC	TBC
SBS	TBC	TBC	TBC

== See also ==
- Television ratings in Australia
