= 2021 Australian Open – Day-by-day summaries =

The 2021 Australian Open described in detail, in the form of day-by-day summaries.

All dates are AEDT (UTC+11)

== Day 1 (8 February) ==
- Seeds out:
  - Men's Singles: (France) Gaël Monfils [10], (France) Benoît Paire [25]
  - Women's Singles: (Germany) Angelique Kerber [23], (United States) Alison Riske [24], (China) Wang Qiang [30]
- Schedule of Play

Matches on main courts
Matches on Rod Laver Arena
Event	Winner	Loser	Score
Women's Singles 1st Round	(Japan) Naomi Osaka [3]	(Russia) Anastasia Pavlyuchenkova	6–1, 6–2
Women's Singles 1st Round	(United States) Serena Williams [10]	(Germany) Laura Siegemund	6–1, 6–1
Men's Singles 1st Round	(Austria) Dominic Thiem [3]	(Kazakhstan) Mikhail Kukushkin	7–6^{(7–2)}, 6–2, 6–3
Women's Singles 1st Round	(Romania) Simona Halep [2]	(Australia) Lizette Cabrera [WC]	6–2, 6–1
Men's Singles 1st Round	(Serbia) Novak Djokovic [1]	(France) Jérémy Chardy	6–3, 6–1, 6–2
Matches on Margaret Court Arena
Event	Winner	Loser	Score
Women's Singles 1st Round	(United States) Venus Williams	(Belgium) Kirsten Flipkens	7–5, 6–2
Women's Singles 1st Round	(United States) Bernarda Pera	(Germany) Angelique Kerber [23]	6–0, 6–4
Men's Singles 1st Round	(Germany) Alexander Zverev [6]	(United States) Marcos Giron	6–7^{(8–10)}, 7–6^{(7–5)}, 6–3, 6–2
Women's Singles 1st Round	(Czech Republic) Petra Kvitová [9]	(Belgium) Greet Minnen [Q]	6–3, 6–4
Men's Singles 1st Round	(Canada) Denis Shapovalov [11]	(Italy) Jannik Sinner	3–6, 6–3, 6–2, 4–6, 6–4
Matches on John Cain Arena
Event	Winner	Loser	Score
Men's Singles 1st Round	(Switzerland) Stan Wawrinka [17]	(Portugal) Pedro Sousa	6–3, 6–2, 6–4
Women's Singles 1st Round	(Australia) Ajla Tomljanović	(Japan) Misaki Doi	6–1, 6–2
Women's Singles 1st Round	(Canada) Bianca Andreescu [8]	(Romania) Mihaela Buzărnescu [LL]	6–2, 4–6, 6–3
Men's Singles 1st Round	(Australia) Nick Kyrgios	(Portugal) Frederico Ferreira Silva [Q]	6–4, 6–4, 6–4
Matches on 1573 Arena
Event	Winner	Loser	Score
Men's Singles 1st Round	(Canada) Milos Raonic [14]	(Argentina) Federico Coria	6–3, 6–3, 6–2
Women's Singles 1st Round	(Poland) Iga Świątek [15]	(Netherlands) Arantxa Rus	6–1, 6–3
Women's Singles 1st Round	(Tunisia) Ons Jabeur [27]	(Germany) Andrea Petkovic	6–3, 3–6, 6–4
Men's Singles 1st Round	(Spain) Pablo Carreño Busta [15]	(Japan) Kei Nishikori	7–5, 7–6^{(7–4)}, 6–2
Coloured background indicates a night match
Day matches began at 11 am (12 pm on John Cain Arena), whilst night matches began at 7 pm AEDT

== Day 2 (9 February) ==
- Seeds out:
  - Men's Singles: (Spain) Roberto Bautista Agut [12], (Belgium) David Goffin [13], (Poland) Hubert Hurkacz [26], (United Kingdom) Dan Evans [30]
  - Women's Singles: (Belarus) Victoria Azarenka [12], (United Kingdom) Johanna Konta [13], (Croatia) Petra Martić [16], (Greece) Maria Sakkari [20], (China) Zhang Shuai [31]
- Schedule of Play

Matches on main courts
Matches on Rod Laver Arena
Event	Winner	Loser	Score
Women's Singles 1st Round	(United States) Sofia Kenin [4]	(Australia) Maddison Inglis [WC]	7–5, 6–4
Women's Singles 1st Round	(Ukraine) Elina Svitolina [5]	(Czech Republic) Marie Bouzková	6–3, 7–6^{(7–5)}
Men's Singles 1st Round	(Spain) Rafael Nadal [2]	(Serbia) Laslo Đere	6–3, 6–4, 6–1
Women's Singles 1st Round	(Australia) Ashleigh Barty [1]	(Montenegro) Danka Kovinić	6–0, 6–0
Men's Singles 1st Round	(Greece) Stefanos Tsitsipas [5]	(France) Gilles Simon	6–1, 6–2, 6–1
Matches on Margaret Court Arena
Event	Winner	Loser	Score
Women's Singles 1st Round	(Spain) Garbiñe Muguruza [14]	(Russia) Margarita Gasparyan [LL]	6–4, 6–0
Women's Singles 1st Round	(United States) Jessica Pegula	(Belarus) Victoria Azarenka [12]	7–5, 6–4
Men's Singles 1st Round	(Russia) Daniil Medvedev [4]	(Canada) Vasek Pospisil	6–2, 6–2, 6–4
Men's Singles 1st Round	(Italy) Matteo Berrettini [9]	(South Africa) Kevin Anderson	7–6^{(11–9)}, 7–5, 6–3
Women's Singles 1st Round	(Australia) Daria Gavrilova [WC]	(Spain) Sara Sorribes Tormo	6–1, 7–5
Matches on John Cain Arena
Event	Winner	Loser	Score
Men's Singles 1st Round	(Russia) Andrey Rublev [7]	(Germany) Yannick Hanfmann	6–3, 6–3, 6–4
Women's Singles 1st Round	(United States) Coco Gauff	(Switzerland) Jil Teichmann	6–3, 6–2
Men's Singles 1st Round	(Australia) Alex de Minaur [21]	(United States) Tennys Sandgren	7–5, 6–1, 6–1
Women's Singles 1st Round	(Australia) Samantha Stosur [WC]	(Australia) Destanee Aiava [WC]	6–4, 6–4
Matches on 1573 Arena
Event	Winner	Loser	Score
Women's Singles 1st Round	(Switzerland) Belinda Bencic [11]	(United States) Lauren Davis	6–3, 4–6, 6–1
Men's Singles 1st Round	(Moldova) Radu Albot	(Spain) Roberto Bautista Agut [12]	6–7^{(1–7)}, 6–0, 6–4, 7–6^{(7–5)}
Women's Singles 1st Round	(Czech Republic) Karolína Plíšková [6]	(Italy) Jasmine Paolini	6–0, 6–2
Men's Singles 1st Round	(Norway) Casper Ruud [24]	(Australia) Jordan Thompson	6–3, 6–3, 2–1, ret.
Coloured background indicates a night match
Day matches began at 11 am (12 pm on John Cain Arena), whilst night matches began at 7 pm AEDT

== Day 3 (10 February) ==
- Seeds out:
  - Men's Singles: (Switzerland) Stan Wawrinka [17], (France) Ugo Humbert [29]
  - Women's Singles: (Canada) Bianca Andreescu [8], (Czech Republic) Petra Kvitová [9], (Kazakhstan) Elena Rybakina [17]
  - Men's Doubles: (Finland) Henri Kontinen / (France) Édouard Roger-Vasselin [11]
  - Women's Doubles: (China) Duan Yingying / (China) Zheng Saisai [8], (Australia) Samantha Stosur / (China) Zhang Shuai [10]
- Schedule of Play

Matches on main courts
Matches on Rod Laver Arena
Event	Winner	Loser	Score
Women's Singles 2nd Round	(Chinese Taipei) Hsieh Su-wei	(Canada) Bianca Andreescu [8]	6–3, 6–2
Women's Singles 2nd Round	(United States) Serena Williams [10]	(Serbia) Nina Stojanović	6–3, 6–0
Men's Singles 2nd Round	(Serbia) Novak Djokovic [1]	(United States) Frances Tiafoe	6–3, 6–7^{(2–7)}, 7–6^{(7–2)}, 6–3
Women's Singles 2nd Round	(Japan) Naomi Osaka [3]	(France) Caroline Garcia	6–2, 6–3
Men's Singles 2nd Round	(Germany) Alexander Zverev [6]	(United States) Maxime Cressy [Q]	7–5, 6–4, 6–3
Matches on Margaret Court Arena
Event	Winner	Loser	Score
Women's Singles 2nd Round	(Belarus) Aryna Sabalenka [7]	(Russia) Daria Kasatkina	7–6^{(7–5)}, 6–3
Women's Singles 2nd Round	(Romania) Sorana Cîrstea	(Czech Republic) Petra Kvitová [9]	6–4, 1–6, 6–1
Men's Singles 2nd Round	(Austria) Dominic Thiem [3]	(Germany) Dominik Koepfer	6–4, 6–0, 6–2
Women's Singles 2nd Round	(Romania) Simona Halep [2]	(Australia) Ajla Tomljanović	4–6, 6–4, 7–5
Men's Singles 2nd Round	(Bulgaria) Grigor Dimitrov [18]	(Australia) Alex Bolt [WC]	7–6^{(7–1)}, 6–1, 6–2
Matches on John Cain Arena
Event	Winner	Loser	Score
Men's Singles 2nd Round	(Hungary) Márton Fucsovics	(Switzerland) Stan Wawrinka [17]	7–5, 6–1, 4–6, 2–6, 7–6^{(11–9)}
Women's Singles 2nd Round	(Italy) Sara Errani [Q]	(United States) Venus Williams	6–1, 6–0
Women's Singles 2nd Round	(Poland) Iga Świątek [15]	(Italy) Camila Giorgi	6–2, 6–4
Men's Singles 2nd Round	(Australia) Nick Kyrgios	(France) Ugo Humbert [29]	5–7, 6–4, 3–6, 7–6^{(7–2)}, 6–4
Matches on 1573 Arena
Event	Winner	Loser	Score
Women's Singles 2nd Round	(Czech Republic) Markéta Vondroušová [19]	(Canada) Rebecca Marino [Q]	6–1, 7–5
Men's Singles 2nd Round	(Argentina) Diego Schwartzman [8]	(France) Alexandre Müller [LL]	6–2, 6–0, 6–3
Women's Singles 2nd Round	(Spain) Garbiñe Muguruza [14]	(Russia) Liudmila Samsonova [Q]	6–3, 6–1
Men's Singles 2nd Round	(United States) Taylor Fritz [27]	(United States) Reilly Opelka	4–6, 7–6^{(8–6)}, 6–7^{(4–7)}, 7–6^{(7–5)}, 6–2
Coloured background indicates a night match
Day matches began at 11 am (12 pm on John Cain Arena), whilst night matches began at 7 pm AEDT

== Day 4 (11 February) ==
- Seeds out:
  - Men's Singles: (Croatia) Borna Ćorić [22], (Italy) Lorenzo Sonego [31]
  - Women's Singles: (United States) Sofia Kenin [4]
  - Men's Doubles: (Spain) Marcel Granollers / (Argentina) Horacio Zeballos [3], (France) Jérémy Chardy / (France) Fabrice Martin [12], (Austria) Oliver Marach / (Netherlands) Robin Haase [13], (Belgium) Sander Gillé / (Belgium) Joran Vliegen [14]
  - Women's Doubles: (Chinese Taipei) Chan Hao-ching / (Chinese Taipei) Latisha Chan [5], (Russia) Veronika Kudermetova / (Russia) Anna Blinkova [15]
- Schedule of Play

Matches on main courts
Matches on Rod Laver Arena
Event	Winner	Loser	Score
Women's Singles 2nd Round	(Czech Republic) Karolína Plíšková [6]	(United States) Danielle Collins	7–5, 6–2
Women's Singles 2nd Round	(Australia) Ashleigh Barty [1]	(Australia) Daria Gavrilova [WC]	6–1, 7–6^{(9–7)}
Men's Singles 2nd Round	(Greece) Stefanos Tsitsipas [5]	(Australia) Thanasi Kokkinakis [WC]	6–7^{(5–7)}, 6–4, 6–1, 6–7^{(5–7)}, 6–4
Women's Singles 2nd Round	(Ukraine) Elina Svitolina [5]	(United States) Coco Gauff	6–4, 6–3
Men's Singles 2nd Round	(Spain) Rafael Nadal [2]	(United States) Michael Mmoh [Q]	6–1, 6–4, 6–2
Matches on Margaret Court Arena
Event	Winner	Loser	Score
Women's Singles 2nd Round	(Switzerland) Belinda Bencic [11]	(Russia) Svetlana Kuznetsova	7–5, 2–6, 6–4
Women's Singles 2nd Round	(Estonia) Kaia Kanepi	(United States) Sofia Kenin [4]	6–3, 6–2
Men's Singles 2nd Round	(Italy) Matteo Berrettini [9]	(Czech Republic) Tomáš Macháč [Q]	6–3, 6–2, 4–6, 6–3
Men's Singles 2nd Round	(Australia) Alex de Minaur [21]	(Uruguay) Pablo Cuevas	6–3, 6–3, 7–5
Women's Singles 2nd Round	(United States) Jessica Pegula	(Australia) Samantha Stosur [WC]	6–0, 6–1
Men's Singles 2nd Round	(United Kingdom) Cameron Norrie	(Russia) Roman Safiullin [Q]	3–6, 7–5, 6–3, 7–6^{(7–3)} (Note: The match originally started on Court 8 before being interrupted by rain. It was then moved to and completed on Margaret Court Arena.)
Matches on John Cain Arena
Event	Winner	Loser	Score
Men's Singles 2nd Round	(Russia) Andrey Rublev [7]	(Brazil) Thiago Monteiro	6–4, 6–4, 7–6^{(10–8)}
Women's Singles 2nd Round	(Estonia) Anett Kontaveit [21]	(United Kingdom) Heather Watson	6–7^{(5–7)}, 6–4, 6–2
Men's Singles 2nd Round	(Italy) Fabio Fognini [16]	(Italy) Salvatore Caruso	4–6, 6–2, 2–6, 6–3, 7–6^{(14–12)}
Men's Singles 2nd Round	(Russia) Daniil Medvedev [4]	(Spain) Roberto Carballés Baena	6–2, 7–5, 6–1
Matches on 1573 Arena
Event	Winner	Loser	Score
Women's Singles 2nd Round	(Belgium) Elise Mertens [18]	(China) Zhu Lin	7–6^{(10–8)}, 6–1
Men's Singles 2nd Round	(Russia) Karen Khachanov [19]	(Lithuania) Ričardas Berankis	6–2, 6–4, 6–4
Women's Singles 2nd Round	(United States) Jennifer Brady [22]	(United States) Madison Brengle	6–1, 6–2
Women's Singles 2nd Round	(Slovenia) Kaja Juvan [Q]	(Egypt) Mayar Sherif [Q]	3–6, 7–6^{(7–2)}, 6–3
Coloured background indicates a night match
Day matches began at 11 am (12 pm on John Cain Arena), whilst night matches began at 7 pm AEDT

== Day 5 (12 February) ==
- Seeds out:
  - Men's Singles: (Argentina) Diego Schwartzman [8], (Canada) Denis Shapovalov [11], (Spain) Pablo Carreño Busta [15], (United States) Taylor Fritz [27], (France) Adrian Mannarino [32]
  - Women's Singles: (Tunisia) Ons Jabeur [27], (Russia) Veronika Kudermetova [32]
  - Men's Doubles: (Australia) Max Purcell / (Australia) Luke Saville [15]
  - Women's Doubles: (Canada) Gabriela Dabrowski / (United States) Bethanie Mattek-Sands [6], (China) Xu Yifan / (China) Yang Zhaoxuan [11]
  - Mixed Doubles: (Chinese Taipei) Chan Hao-ching / (Colombia) Juan Sebastián Cabal [4], (Netherlands) Demi Schuurs / (Netherlands) Wesley Koolhof [5], (Chinese Taipei) Latisha Chan / (Croatia) Ivan Dodig [7]
- Schedule of Play

Matches on main courts
Matches on Rod Laver Arena
Event	Winner	Loser	Score
Women's Singles 3rd Round	(Belarus) Aryna Sabalenka [7]	(United States) Ann Li	6–3, 6–1
Women's Singles 3rd Round	(United States) Serena Williams [10]	(Russia) Anastasia Potapova	7–6^{(7–5)}, 6–2
Men's Singles 3rd Round	(Germany) Alexander Zverev [6]	(France) Adrian Mannarino [32]	6–3, 6–3, 6–1
Women's Singles 3rd Round	(Romania) Simona Halep [2]	(Russia) Veronika Kudermetova [32]	6–1, 6–3
Men's Singles 3rd Round	(Serbia) Novak Djokovic [1]	(United States) Taylor Fritz [27]	7–6^{(7–0)}, 6–4, 3–6, 4–6, 6–2
Matches on Margaret Court Arena
Event	Winner	Loser	Score
Women's Singles 3rd Round	(Czech Republic) Markéta Vondroušová [19]	(Romania) Sorana Cîrstea	6–2, 6–4
Women's Singles 3rd Round	(Spain) Garbiñe Muguruza [14]	(Kazakhstan) Zarina Diyas	6–1, 6–1
Men's Singles 3rd Round	(Bulgaria) Grigor Dimitrov [18]	(Spain) Pablo Carreño Busta [15]	6–0, 1–0, ret.
Men's Singles 3rd Round	(Canada) Félix Auger-Aliassime [20]	(Canada) Denis Shapovalov [11]	7–5, 7–5, 6–3
Women's Singles 3rd Round	(Poland) Iga Świątek [15]	(France) Fiona Ferro	6–4, 6–3
Matches on John Cain Arena
Event	Winner	Loser	Score
Women's Singles 3rd Round	(Chinese Taipei) Hsieh Su-wei	(Italy) Sara Errani [Q]	6–4, 2–6, 7–5
Women's Singles 3rd Round	(Japan) Naomi Osaka [3]	(Tunisia) Ons Jabeur [27]	6–3, 6–2
Men's Singles 3rd Round	(Russia) Aslan Karatsev [Q]	(Argentina) Diego Schwartzman [8]	6–3, 6–3, 6–3
Men's Singles 3rd Round	(Austria) Dominic Thiem [3]	(Australia) Nick Kyrgios	4–6, 4–6, 6–3, 6–4, 6–4
Matches on 1573 Arena
Event	Winner	Loser	Score
Men's Doubles 2nd Round	(United Kingdom) Jamie Murray [6] (Brazil) Bruno Soares [6]	(Serbia) Laslo Đere (Italy) Stefano Travaglia	6–1, 6–2
Women's Doubles 2nd Round	(Canada) Leylah Annie Fernandez (United Kingdom) Heather Watson	(Australia) Olivia Gadecki [WC] (Australia) Belinda Woolcock [WC]	7–5, 6–2
Men's Doubles 1st Round	(Kazakhstan) Alexander Bublik (Kazakhstan) Andrey Golubev	(Italy) Salvatore Caruso [Alt] (Finland) Emil Ruusuvuori [Alt]	7–6^{(8–6)}, 7–5
Men's Singles 3rd Round	(Canada) Milos Raonic [14]	(Hungary) Márton Fucsovics	7–6^{(7–2)}, 5–7, 6–2, 6–2
Coloured background indicates a night match
Day matches began at 11 am (12 pm on John Cain Arena), whilst night matches began at 7 pm AEDT

== Day 6 (13 February) ==
- Seeds out:
  - Men's Singles: (Russia) Karen Khachanov [19], (Australia) Alex de Minaur [21], (Serbia) Filip Krajinović [28]
  - Women's Singles: (Czech Republic) Karolína Plíšková [6], (Switzerland) Belinda Bencic [11], (Estonia) Anett Kontaveit [21], (Kazakhstan) Yulia Putintseva [26], (Russia) Ekaterina Alexandrova [29]
  - Men's Doubles: (Colombia) Juan Sebastián Cabal / (Colombia) Robert Farah [1], (United Kingdom) Ken Skupski / (United Kingdom) Neal Skupski [16]
  - Women's Doubles: (Chinese Taipei) Hsieh Su-wei / (Czech Republic) Barbora Strýcová [1], (Belgium) Kirsten Flipkens / (Slovenia) Andreja Klepač [14]
- Schedule of Play

Matches on main courts
Matches on Rod Laver Arena
Event	Winner	Loser	Score
Women's Singles 3rd Round	(Czech Republic) Karolína Muchová [25]	(Czech Republic) Karolína Plíšková [6]	7–5, 7–5
Men's Singles 3rd Round	(Russia) Daniil Medvedev [4]	(Serbia) Filip Krajinović [28]	6–3, 6–3, 4–6, 3–6, 6–0
Women's Singles 3rd Round	(Belgium) Elise Mertens [18]	(Switzerland) Belinda Bencic [11]	6–2, 6–1
Women's Singles 3rd Round	(United States) Shelby Rogers	(Estonia) Anett Kontaveit [21]	6–4, 6–3
Men's Singles 3rd Round	(Spain) Rafael Nadal [2]	(United Kingdom) Cameron Norrie	7–5, 6–2, 7–5
Matches on Margaret Court Arena
Event	Winner	Loser	Score
Women's Singles 3rd Round	(Ukraine) Elina Svitolina [5]	(Kazakhstan) Yulia Putintseva [26]	6–4, 6–0
Women's Singles 3rd Round	(Croatia) Donna Vekić [28]	(Estonia) Kaia Kanepi	5–7, 7–6^{(7–2)}, 6–4
Men's Singles 3rd Round	(Russia) Andrey Rublev [7]	(Spain) Feliciano López	7–5, 6–2, 6–3
Women's Singles 3rd Round	(Australia) Ashleigh Barty [1]	(Russia) Ekaterina Alexandrova [29]	6–2, 6–4
Men's Singles 3rd Round	(Italy) Fabio Fognini [16]	(Australia) Alex de Minaur [21]	6–4, 6–3, 6–4
Matches on John Cain Arena
Event	Winner	Loser	Score
Women's Singles 3rd Round	(United States) Jessica Pegula	(France) Kristina Mladenovic	6–2, 6–1
Women's Singles 3rd Round	(United States) Jennifer Brady [22]	(Slovenia) Kaja Juvan [Q]	6–1, 6–3
Men's Singles 3rd Round	(Greece) Stefanos Tsitsipas [5]	(Sweden) Mikael Ymer	6–4, 6–1, 6–1
Men's Singles 3rd Round	(Italy) Matteo Berrettini [9]	(Russia) Karen Khachanov [19]	7–6^{(7–1)}, 7–6^{(7–5)}, 7–6^{(7–5)}
Matches on 1573 Arena
Event	Winner	Loser	Score
Women's Doubles 2nd Round	(United States) Bernarda Pera (Netherlands) Rosalie van der Hoek	(Netherlands) Arantxa Rus (Slovenia) Tamara Zidanšek	6–4, 6–4
Men's Singles 3rd Round	(Norway) Casper Ruud [24]	(Moldova) Radu Albot	6–1, 5–7, 6–4, 6–4
Men's Doubles 2nd Round	(New Zealand) Marcus Daniell (Austria) Philipp Oswald	(Germany) Dominik Koepfer (United States) Tennys Sandgren	7–6^{(7–4)}, 6–7^{(3–7)}, 6–2
Men's Doubles 2nd Round	(Brazil) Marcelo Melo [7] (Romania) Horia Tecău [7]	(Moldova) Radu Albot (United Kingdom) Dan Evans	6–1, 7–6^{(7–2)}
Coloured background indicates a night match
Day matches began at 11 am (12 pm on John Cain Arena), whilst night matches began at 7 pm AEDT

== Day 7 (14 February) ==
- Seeds out:
  - Men's Singles: (Austria) Dominic Thiem [3], (Canada) Milos Raonic [14], (Canada) Félix Auger-Aliassime [20], (Serbia) Dušan Lajović [23]
  - Women's Singles: (Belarus) Aryna Sabalenka [7], (Spain) Garbiñe Muguruza [14], (Poland) Iga Świątek [15], (Czech Republic) Markéta Vondroušová [19]
  - Women's Doubles: (United States) Hayley Carter / (Brazil) Luisa Stefani [12], (Germany) Laura Siegemund / (Russia) Vera Zvonareva [16]
  - Mixed Doubles: (Czech Republic) Barbora Strýcová / (Croatia) Nikola Mektić [1]
- Schedule of Play

Matches on main courts
Matches on Rod Laver Arena
Event	Winner	Loser	Score
Women's Singles 4th Round	(Japan) Naomi Osaka [3]	(Spain) Garbiñe Muguruza [14]	4–6, 6–4, 7–5
Women's Singles 4th Round	(United States) Serena Williams [10]	(Belarus) Aryna Sabalenka [7]	6–4, 2–6, 6–4
Men's Singles 4th Round	(Bulgaria) Grigor Dimitrov [18]	(Austria) Dominic Thiem [3]	6–4, 6–4, 6–0
Women's Singles 4th Round	(Romania) Simona Halep [2]	(Poland) Iga Świątek [15]	3–6, 6–1, 6–4
Men's Singles 4th Round	(Serbia) Novak Djokovic [1]	(Canada) Milos Raonic [14]	7–6^{(7–4)}, 4–6, 6–1, 6–4
Matches on Margaret Court Arena
Event	Winner	Loser	Score
Women's Singles 4th Round	(Chinese Taipei) Hsieh Su-wei	(Czech Republic) Markéta Vondroušová [19]	6–4, 6–2
Men's Singles 4th Round	(Russia) Aslan Karatsev [Q]	(Canada) Félix Auger-Aliassime [20]	3–6, 1–6, 6–3, 6–3, 6–4
Men's Doubles 2nd Round	(Netherlands) Wesley Koolhof [4] (Poland) Łukasz Kubot [4]	(Australia) Nick Kyrgios [WC] (Australia) Thanasi Kokkinakis [WC]	6–3, 6–4
Men's Singles 4th Round	(Germany) Alexander Zverev [6]	(Serbia) Dušan Lajović [23]	6–4, 7–6^{(7–5)}, 6–3
Coloured background indicates a night match
Day matches began at 11 am, whilst night matches began at 7 pm AEDT

== Day 8 (15 February) ==
- Seeds out:
  - Men's Singles: (Italy) Matteo Berrettini [9], (Italy) Fabio Fognini [16], (Norway) Casper Ruud [24]
  - Women's Singles: (Ukraine) Elina Svitolina [5], (Belgium) Elise Mertens [18], (Croatia) Donna Vekić [28]
  - Men's Doubles: (Netherlands) Wesley Koolhof / (Poland) Łukasz Kubot [4], (Brazil) Marcelo Melo / (Romania) Horia Tecău [7], (Australia) John Peers / (New Zealand) Michael Venus [10]
  - Women's Doubles: (Chile) Alexa Guarachi / (United States) Desirae Krawczyk [9], (Ukraine) Lyudmyla Kichenok / (Latvia) Jeļena Ostapenko [13]
  - Mixed Doubles: (United States) Nicole Melichar / (Colombia) Robert Farah [2]
- Schedule of Play

Matches on main courts
Matches on Rod Laver Arena
Event	Winner	Loser	Score
Women's Singles 4th Round	(United States) Jessica Pegula	(Ukraine) Elina Svitolina [5]	6–4, 3–6, 6–3
Women's Singles 4th Round	(United States) Jennifer Brady [22]	(Croatia) Donna Vekić [28]	6–1, 7–5
Men's Singles 4th Round	(Spain) Rafael Nadal [2]	(Italy) Fabio Fognini [16]	6–3, 6–4, 6–2
Women's Singles 4th Round	(Australia) Ashleigh Barty [1]	(United States) Shelby Rogers	6–3, 6–4
Men's Singles 4th Round	(Greece) Stefanos Tsitsipas [5]	(Italy) Matteo Berrettini [9]	Walkover
Matches on Margaret Court Arena
Event	Winner	Loser	Score
Wheelchair Quad Singles Semifinals	(Australia) Dylan Alcott [1]	(Netherlands) Niels Vink	6–4, 6–3
Men's Singles 4th Round	(Russia) Daniil Medvedev [4]	(United States) Mackenzie McDonald [PR]	6–4, 6–2, 6–3
Men's Singles 4th Round	(Russia) Andrey Rublev [7]	(Norway) Casper Ruud [24]	6–2, 7–6^{(7–3)}, ret.
Women's Singles 4th Round	(Czech Republic) Karolína Muchová [25]	(Belgium) Elise Mertens [18]	7–6^{(7–5)}, 7–5
Coloured background indicates a night match
Day matches began at 11 am, whilst night matches began at 7 pm AEDT

== Day 9 (16 February) ==
- Seeds out:
  - Men's Singles: (Germany) Alexander Zverev [6], (Bulgaria) Grigor Dimitrov [18]
  - Women's Singles: (Romania) Simona Halep [2]
  - Men's Doubles: (France) Pierre-Hugues Herbert / (France) Nicolas Mahut [8]
  - Women's Doubles: (Japan) Shuko Aoyama / (Japan) Ena Shibahara [7]
  - Mixed Doubles: (Brazil) Luisa Stefani / (Brazil) Bruno Soares [8]
- Schedule of Play

Matches on main courts
Matches on Rod Laver Arena
Event	Winner	Loser	Score
Women's Singles Quarterfinals	(Japan) Naomi Osaka [3]	(Chinese Taipei) Hsieh Su-wei	6–2, 6–2
Men's Singles Quarterfinals	(Russia) Aslan Karatsev [Q]	(Bulgaria) Grigor Dimitrov [18]	2–6, 6–4, 6–1, 6–2
Women's Singles Quarterfinals	(United States) Serena Williams [10]	(Romania) Simona Halep [2]	6–3, 6–3
Men's Singles Quarterfinals	(Serbia) Novak Djokovic [1]	(Germany) Alexander Zverev [6]	6–7^{(6–8)}, 6–2, 6–4, 7–6^{(8–6)}
Matches on Margaret Court Arena
Event	Winner	Loser	Score
Wheelchair Quad Doubles Final	(Australia) Dylan Alcott [1] (Australia) Heath Davidson [1]	(United Kingdom) Andy Lapthorne [2] (United States) David Wagner [2]	6–2, 3–6, [10–7]
Women's Doubles Quarterfinals	(United States) Nicole Melichar [4] (Netherlands) Demi Schuurs [4]	(United States) Coco Gauff (United States) Caty McNally	7–6^{(7–4)}, 6–1
Mixed Doubles 2nd Round	(United States) Desirae Krawczyk (United Kingdom) Joe Salisbury	(Russia) Vera Zvonareva (Brazil) Marcelo Melo	6–4, 6–4
Men's Doubles Quarterfinals	(Croatia) Nikola Mektić [2] (Croatia) Mate Pavić [2]	(France) Pierre-Hugues Herbert [8] (France) Nicolas Mahut [8]	6–4, 4–6, 7–6^{(10–3)}
Mixed Doubles 2nd Round	(Australia) Samantha Stosur [WC] (Australia) Matthew Ebden [WC]	(Brazil) Luisa Stefani [8] (Brazil) Bruno Soares [8]	6–3, 6–1
Coloured background indicates a night match
Day matches began at 11 am (12:30 pm on Rod Laver Arena), whilst night matches began at 7 pm AEDT

== Day 10 (17 February) ==
- Seeds out:
  - Men's Singles: (Spain) Rafael Nadal [2], (Russia) Andrey Rublev [7]
  - Women's Singles: (Australia) Ashleigh Barty [1]
  - Women's Doubles: (United States) Nicole Melichar / (Netherlands) Demi Schuurs [4]
  - Mixed Doubles: (Canada) Gabriela Dabrowski / (Croatia) Mate Pavić [3]
- Schedule of Play

Matches on main courts
Matches on Rod Laver Arena
Event	Winner	Loser	Score
Women's Singles Quarterfinals	(Czech Republic) Karolína Muchová [25]	(Australia) Ashleigh Barty [1]	1–6, 6–3, 6–2
Women's Singles Quarterfinals	(United States) Jennifer Brady [22]	(United States) Jessica Pegula	4–6, 6–2, 6–1
Men's Singles Quarterfinals	(Russia) Daniil Medvedev [4]	(Russia) Andrey Rublev [7]	7–5, 6–3, 6–2
Men's Singles Quarterfinals	(Greece) Stefanos Tsitsipas [5]	(Spain) Rafael Nadal [2]	3–6, 2–6, 7–6^{(7–4)}, 6–4, 7–5
Matches on Margaret Court Arena
Event	Winner	Loser	Score
Men's Doubles Quarterfinals	(United States) Rajeev Ram [5] (United Kingdom) Joe Salisbury [5]	(New Zealand) Marcus Daniell (Austria) Philipp Oswald	7–6^{(8–6)}, 6–2
Women's Doubles Semifinals	(Belgium) Elise Mertens [2] (Belarus) Aryna Sabalenka [2]	(United States) Nicole Melichar [4] (Netherlands) Demi Schuurs [4]	7–5, 6–4
Men's Doubles Quarterfinals	(United Kingdom) Jamie Murray (Brazil) Bruno Soares [6]	(El Salvador) Marcelo Arévalo (Netherlands) Matwé Middelkoop	6–3, 6–4
Mixed Doubles Quarterfinals	(Australia) Storm Sanders [WC] (Australia) Marc Polmans [WC]	(Australia) Arina Rodionova [WC] (Australia) Max Purcell [WC]	4–6, 7–5^{(10–8)}
Wheelchair Quad Singles Final	(Australia) Dylan Alcott [1]	(Netherlands) Sam Schröder	6–1, 6–0 (Note: This match was originally scheduled on Rod Laver Arena, but later moved to Margaret Court Arena due to the length of the Tsitsipas vs. Nadal match.)
Coloured background indicates a night match
Day matches began at 11 am, whilst night matches began at 7:30 pm AEDT

== Day 11 (18 February) ==
- Seeds out:
  - Women's Singles: (United States) Serena Williams [10], (Czech Republic) Karolína Muchová [25]
  - Men's Doubles: (Croatia) Nikola Mektić / (Croatia) Mate Pavić [2]
- Schedule of Play

Matches on main courts
Matches on Rod Laver Arena
Event	Winner	Loser	Score
Mixed Doubles Quarterfinals	(Australia) Samantha Stosur [WC] (Australia) Matthew Ebden [WC]	(United States) Hayley Carter [Alt] (Belgium) Sander Gillé [Alt]	6–3, 6–2
Women's Singles Semifinals	(Japan) Naomi Osaka [3]	(United States) Serena Williams [10]	6–3, 6–4
Women's Singles Semifinals	(United States) Jennifer Brady [22]	(Czech Republic) Karolína Muchová [25]	6–4, 3–6, 6–4
Men's Singles Semifinals	(Serbia) Novak Djokovic [1]	(Russia) Aslan Karatsev [Q]	6–3, 6–4, 6–2
Matches on Margaret Court Arena
Event	Winner	Loser	Score
Mixed Doubles Quarterfinals	(United States) Desirae Krawczyk (United Kingdom) Joe Salisbury	(Slovenia) Andreja Klepač (United Kingdom) Neal Skupski	6–3, 6–4
Mixed Doubles Semifinals	(Czech Republic) Barbora Krejčíková [6] (United States) Rajeev Ram [6]	(Australia) Storm Sanders [WC] (Australia) Marc Polmans [WC]	6–3, 6–3
Men's Doubles Semifinals	(Croatia) Ivan Dodig [9] (Slovakia) Filip Polášek [9]	(Croatia) Nikola Mektić [2] (Croatia) Mate Pavić [2]	4–6, 6–4, 6–3
Coloured background indicates a night match
Day matches began at 11 am, whilst night matches began at 7:30 pm AEDT

== Day 12 (19 February) ==
- Seeds out:
  - Men's Singles: (Greece) Stefanos Tsitsipas [5]
  - Men's Doubles: (United Kingdom) Jamie Murray / (Brazil) Bruno Soares [6]
  - Women's Doubles: (Czech Republic) Barbora Krejčíková / (Czech Republic) Kateřina Siniaková [3]
- Schedule of Play

Matches on main courts
Matches on Rod Laver Arena
Event	Winner	Loser	Score
Men's Doubles Semifinals	(United States) Rajeev Ram [5] (United Kingdom) Joe Salisbury [5]	(United Kingdom) Jamie Murray [6] (Brazil) Bruno Soares [6]	6–4, 7–6^{(7–2)}
Women's Doubles Final	(Belgium) Elise Mertens [2] (Belarus) Aryna Sabalenka [2]	(Czech Republic) Barbora Krejčíková [3] (Czech Republic) Kateřina Siniaková [3]	6–2, 6–3
Men's Singles Semifinals	(Russia) Daniil Medvedev [4]	(Greece) Stefanos Tsitsipas [5]	6–4, 6–2, 7–5
Coloured background indicates a night match
Day matches began at 1 pm, whilst night matches began at 7:30 pm AEDT

== Day 13 (20 February) ==
- Seeds out:
  - Women's Singles: (United States) Jennifer Brady [22]
- Schedule of Play

Matches on main courts
Matches on Rod Laver Arena
Event	Winner	Loser	Score
Women's Singles Final	(Japan) Naomi Osaka [3]	(United States) Jennifer Brady [22]	6–4, 6–3
Mixed Doubles Final	(Czech Republic) Barbora Krejčíková [6] (United States) Rajeev Ram [6]	(Australia) Samantha Stosur [WC] (Australia) Matthew Ebden [WC]	6–1, 6–4
Coloured background indicates a night match
night matches began at 7:30 pm AEDT

== Day 14 (21 February) ==
- Seeds out:
  - Men's Singles: (Russia) Daniil Medvedev [4]
  - Men's Doubles: (United States) Rajeev Ram / (United Kingdom) Joe Salisbury [5]
- Schedule of Play

Matches on main courts
Matches on Rod Laver Arena
Event	Winner	Loser	Score
Men's Doubles Final	(Croatia) Ivan Dodig [9] (Slovakia) Filip Polášek [9]	(United States) Rajeev Ram [5] (United Kingdom) Joe Salisbury [5]	6–3, 6–4
Men's Singles Final	(Serbia) Novak Djokovic [1]	(Russia) Daniil Medvedev [4]	7–5, 6–2, 6–2
Coloured background indicates a night match
Day matches began at 3 pm, whilst night matches began at 7:30 pm AEDT
