= 2021 Australian Open – Men's doubles =

Men's doubles
- 2021 Australian Open

Final
- Champions: (Croatia) Ivan Dodig (Slovakia) Filip Polášek
- Runners-up: (United States) Rajeev Ram (United Kingdom) Joe Salisbury
- Score: 6–3, 6–4

Details
- Draw: 64
- Seeds: 16

Events
Singles	men	women		boys	girls
Doubles	men	women	mixed	boys	girls
WC Singles	men	women	quad
WC Doubles	men	women	quad
Legends	men	women	mixed
- Australian Open

Ivan Dodig and Filip Polášek defeated the defending champions Rajeev Ram and Joe Salisbury in the final, 6–3, 6–4 to win the men's doubles tennis title at the 2021 Australian Open. With the win, Dodig and Polášek claimed their first Grand Slam title as a team. The victory earned Polášek his first major title, and made him the second Slovak to win one after Daniela Hantuchová.

Mate Pavić was in contention to reclaim the ATP No. 1 doubles ranking, but he failed to do so after he and Nikola Mektić lost in the semifinals to Dodig and Polášek.

== Seeds ==
1. (Colombia) Juan Sebastián Cabal / (Colombia) Robert Farah (second round)
2. (Croatia) Nikola Mektić / (Croatia) Mate Pavić (semifinals)
3. (Spain) Marcel Granollers / (Argentina) Horacio Zeballos (first round)
4. (Netherlands) Wesley Koolhof / (Poland) Łukasz Kubot (third round)
5. (United States) Rajeev Ram / (United Kingdom) Joe Salisbury (final)
6. (United Kingdom) Jamie Murray / (Brazil) Bruno Soares (semifinals)
7. (Brazil) Marcelo Melo / (Romania) Horia Tecău (third round)
8. (France) Pierre-Hugues Herbert / (France) Nicolas Mahut (quarterfinals)

9. (Croatia) Ivan Dodig / (Slovakia) Filip Polášek (champions)
10. (Australia) John Peers / (New Zealand) Michael Venus (third round)
11. (Finland) Henri Kontinen / (France) Édouard Roger-Vasselin (first round)
12. (France) Jérémy Chardy / (France) Fabrice Martin (first round)
13. (Netherlands) Robin Haase / (Austria) Oliver Marach (first round)
14. (Belgium) Sander Gillé / (Belgium) Joran Vliegen (first round)
15. (Australia) Max Purcell / (Australia) Luke Saville (second round)
16. (United Kingdom) Ken Skupski / (United Kingdom) Neal Skupski (second round)

Click on the seed number of a player to go to their draw section.

== Draw ==
Key

- Q = Qualifier
- WC = Wild card
- LL = Lucky loser
- Alt = Alternate
- ITF = ITF entry
- PR = Protected ranking
- SR = Special ranking
- SE = Special exempt
- JE = Junior exempt
- JR = Junior Accelerator Programme entrant
- CO = College Accelerator Programme entrant
- NG = Next Gen Accelerator Program entrant
- w/o = Walkover
- r = Retired
- d = Defaulted

=== Finals ===
Quarterfinals
(El Salvador) Marcelo Arévalo (Netherlands) Matwé Middelkoop	3	4
6	(United Kingdom) Jamie Murray (Brazil) Bruno Soares	6	6
(New Zealand) Marcus Daniell (Austria) Philipp Oswald	6^{6}	2
5	(United States) Rajeev Ram (United Kingdom) Joe Salisbury	7^{8}	6
9	(Croatia) Ivan Dodig (Slovakia) Filip Polášek	6	2	6
WC	(Australia) Matthew Ebden (Australia) John-Patrick Smith	4	6	4
8	(France) Pierre-Hugues Herbert (France) Nicolas Mahut	4	6	6^{3}
2	(Croatia) Nikola Mektić (Croatia) Mate Pavić	6	4	7^{10}

Semifinals
6	(United Kingdom) Jamie Murray (Brazil) Bruno Soares	4	6^{2}
5	(United States) Rajeev Ram (United Kingdom) Joe Salisbury	6	7^{7}
9	(Croatia) Ivan Dodig (Slovakia) Filip Polášek	4	6	6
2	(Croatia) Nikola Mektić (Croatia) Mate Pavić	6	4	3

Final
5	(United States) Rajeev Ram (United Kingdom) Joe Salisbury	3	4
9	(Croatia) Ivan Dodig (Slovakia) Filip Polášek	6	6

=== Top half ===
==== Section 1 ====
First round
1	(Colombia) JS Cabal (Colombia) R Farah	6^{5}	7^{8}	6
(Georgia (country)) N Basilashvili (Germany) A Begemann	7^{7}	6^{6}	4
Alt	(Italy) S Caruso (Finland) E Ruusuvuori	6^{6}	5
(Kazakhstan) A Bublik (Kazakhstan) A Golubev	7^{8}	7
(Brazil) M Demoliner (Mexico) S González	7^{7}	6^{6}	3
(El Salvador) M Arévalo (Netherlands) M Middelkoop	6^{1}	7^{8}	6
(Serbia) M Kecmanović (Norway) C Ruud	6	1	6
13	(Netherlands) R Haase (Austria) O Marach	3	6	0
12	(France) J Chardy (France) F Martin	3	4
(Italy) S Bolelli (Argentina) M González	6	6
(Italy) L Sonego (Italy) A Vavassori	6^{7}	6	6
(Monaco) R Arneodo (France) B Paire	7^{9}	2	4
(Serbia) L Đere (Italy) S Travaglia	6	6
WC	(Australia) A Harris (Australia) A Popyrin	3	4
(United States) M Giron (United Kingdom) C Norrie	6^{6}	3
6	(United Kingdom) J Murray (Brazil) B Soares	7^{8}	6

Second round
1	(Colombia) JS Cabal (Colombia) R Farah	4	4
(Kazakhstan) A Bublik (Kazakhstan) A Golubev	6	6
(El Salvador) M Arévalo (Netherlands) M Middelkoop	6	6
(Serbia) M Kecmanović (Norway) C Ruud	3	1
(Italy) S Bolelli (Argentina) M González	6	7^{7}
(Italy) L Sonego (Italy) A Vavassori	2	6^{5}
(Serbia) L Đere (Italy) S Travaglia	1	2
6	(United Kingdom) J Murray (Brazil) B Soares	6	6

Third round
(Kazakhstan) A Bublik (Kazakhstan) A Golubev	7^{7}	6^{3}	3
(El Salvador) M Arévalo (Netherlands) M Middelkoop	6^{4}	7^{7}	6
(Italy) S Bolelli (Argentina) M González	7^{7}	2	4
6	(United Kingdom) J Murray (Brazil) B Soares	6^{5}	6	6

Quarterfinals
(El Salvador) M Arévalo (Netherlands) M Middelkoop	3	4
6	(United Kingdom) J Murray (Brazil) B Soares	6	6

==== Section 2 ====
First round
3	(Spain) M Granollers (Argentina) H Zeballos	5	4
(United States) N Monroe (United States) F Tiafoe	7	6
(Canada) V Pospisil (Canada) D Shapovalov	6	7^{7}
Alt	(Slovakia) A Martin (Austria) T-S Weissborn	3	6^{3}
(France) A Mannarino (France) G Simon	4	2
(New Zealand) M Daniell (Austria) P Oswald	6	6
(Germany) D Koepfer (United States) T Sandgren	6^{4}	6	7^{10}
14	(Belgium) S Gillé (Belgium) J Vliegen	7^{7}	2	6^{8}
10	(Australia) J Peers (New Zealand) M Venus	6	6
(Australia) A de Minaur (Australia) M Reid	3	2
(India) R Bopanna (Japan) B McLachlan	4	6^{0}
WC	(South Korea) J-s Nam (South Korea) M-k Song	6	7^{7}
(Bosnia and Herzegovina) T Brkić (Pakistan) A-u-H Qureshi	6	6^{4}	6
(Spain) P Andújar (Spain) P Martínez	3	7^{7}	1
(United Kingdom) J O'Mara (New Zealand) A Sitak	4	4
5	(United States) R Ram (United Kingdom) J Salisbury	6	6

Second round
(United States) N Monroe (United States) F Tiafoe	2	7^{11}	6
(Canada) V Pospisil (Canada) D Shapovalov	6	6^{9}	2
(New Zealand) M Daniell (Austria) P Oswald	7^{7}	6^{3}	6
(Germany) D Koepfer (United States) T Sandgren	6^{4}	7^{7}	2
10	(Australia) J Peers (New Zealand) M Venus	6	6
WC	(South Korea) J-s Nam (South Korea) M-k Song	4	3
(Bosnia and Herzegovina) T Brkić (Pakistan) A-u-H Qureshi	3	6	2
5	(United States) R Ram (United Kingdom) J Salisbury	6	4	6

Third round
(United States) N Monroe (United States) F Tiafoe	3	5
(New Zealand) M Daniell (Austria) P Oswald	6	7
10	(Australia) J Peers (New Zealand) M Venus	6^{4}	6^{4}
5	(United States) R Ram (United Kingdom) J Salisbury	7^{7}	7^{7}

Quarterfinals
(New Zealand) M Daniell (Austria) P Oswald	6^{6}	2
5	(United States) R Ram (United Kingdom) J Salisbury	7^{8}	6

=== Bottom half ===
==== Section 3 ====
First round
7	(Brazil) M Melo (Romania) H Tecău	3
(Serbia) F Krajinović (Serbia) D Lajović	0^{r}
(Moldova) R Albot (United Kingdom) D Evans	6	6
(Argentina) A Molteni (Monaco) H Nys	2	3
(Slovenia) A Bedene (Czech Republic) J Veselý	7^{7}	6^{5}	6^{7}
(United Kingdom) L Bambridge (United Kingdom) D Inglot	6^{2}	7^{7}	7^{10}
PR	(Spain) P Carreño Busta (Spain) M López	1	3
9	(Croatia) I Dodig (Slovakia) F Polášek	6	6
15	(Australia) M Purcell (Australia) L Saville	6	6
(Argentina) G Durán (Spain) A Ramos Viñolas	3	3
(Uruguay) P Cuevas (Argentina) G Pella	7^{7}	4	4
WC	(Australia) M Ebden (Australia) J-P Smith	6^{1}	6	6
WC	(Australia) T Kokkinakis (Australia) N Kyrgios	6	6
Alt	(South Africa) L Harris (Austria) J Knowle	2	4
(Uruguay) A Behar (Ecuador) G Escobar	3	4
4	(Netherlands) W Koolhof (Poland) Ł Kubot	6	6

Second round
7	(Brazil) M Melo (Romania) H Tecău	6	7^{7}
(Moldova) R Albot (United Kingdom) D Evans	1	6^{2}
(United Kingdom) L Bambridge (United Kingdom) D Inglot	4	5
9	(Croatia) I Dodig (Slovakia) F Polášek	6	7
15	(Australia) M Purcell (Australia) L Saville	6^{3}	4
WC	(Australia) M Ebden (Australia) J-P Smith	7^{7}	6
WC	(Australia) T Kokkinakis (Australia) N Kyrgios	3	4
4	(Netherlands) W Koolhof (Poland) Ł Kubot	6	6

Third round
7	(Brazil) M Melo (Romania) H Tecău	4	3
9	(Croatia) I Dodig (Slovakia) F Polášek	6	6
WC	(Australia) M Ebden (Australia) J-P Smith	7^{7}	6
4	(Netherlands) W Koolhof (Poland) Ł Kubot	6^{2}	4

Quarterfinals
9	(Croatia) I Dodig (Slovakia) F Polášek	6	2	6
WC	(Australia) M Ebden (Australia) J-P Smith	4	6	4

==== Section 4 ====
First round
8	(France) P-H Herbert (France) N Mahut	6	6
Alt	(Italy) G Mager (Japan) Y Nishioka	2	3
(Germany) Y Hanfmann (Germany) K Krawietz	6	6
(India) D Sharan (Slovakia) I Zelenay	1	4
WC	(Australia) J Duckworth (Australia) M Polmans	6	6
(Serbia) N Ćaćić (Denmark) F Nielsen	4	4
(Lithuania) R Berankis (Kazakhstan) M Kukushkin	7	6
11	(Finland) H Kontinen (France) É Roger-Vasselin	5	4
16	(United Kingdom) K Skupski (United Kingdom) N Skupski	6	6
(Canada) F Auger-Aliassime (Poland) H Hurkacz	3	2
(Argentina) F Coria (Argentina) D Schwartzman	6^{5}	1
(Australia) J Millman (Brazil) T Monteiro	7^{7}	6
WC	(Greece) Pe Tsitsipas (Greece) S Tsitsipas	4	6	4
PR	(United States) M McDonald (United States) T Paul	6	3	6
(Chinese Taipei) Y-h Lu (United States) S Querrey	6^{4}	3
2	(Croatia) N Mektić (Croatia) M Pavić	7^{7}	6

Second round
8	(France) P-H Herbert (France) N Mahut	7	6
(Germany) Y Hanfmann (Germany) K Krawietz	5	3
WC	(Australia) J Duckworth (Australia) M Polmans	7^{7}	6
(Lithuania) R Berankis (Kazakhstan) M Kukushkin	6^{3}	2
16	(United Kingdom) K Skupski (United Kingdom) N Skupski	6	6^{5}	4
(Australia) J Millman (Brazil) T Monteiro	3	7^{7}	6
PR	(United States) M McDonald (United States) T Paul	1	4
2	(Croatia) N Mektić (Croatia) M Pavić	6	6

Third round
8	(France) P-H Herbert (France) N Mahut	6	6
WC	(Australia) J Duckworth (Australia) M Polmans	4	3
(Australia) J Millman (Brazil) T Monteiro	6^{2}	4
2	(Croatia) N Mektić (Croatia) M Pavić	7^{7}	6

Quarterfinals
8	(France) P-H Herbert (France) N Mahut	4	6	6^{3}
2	(Croatia) N Mektić (Croatia) M Pavić	6	4	7^{10}

== Other entry information ==
=== Wild cards ===
- ~~(Australia) Alex Bolt / (Australia) Jordan Thompson~~
- (Australia) James Duckworth / (Australia) Marc Polmans
- (Australia) Matthew Ebden / (Australia) John-Patrick Smith
- (Australia) Andrew Harris / (Australia) Alexei Popyrin
- (Australia) Thanasi Kokkinakis / (Australia) Nick Kyrgios
- (South Korea) Nam Ji-sung / (South Korea) Song Min-kyu
- (Greece) Stefanos Tsitsipas / (Greece) Petros Tsitsipas

=== Protected ranking ===
- (Spain) Pablo Carreño Busta / (Spain) Marc López
- (United States) Mackenzie McDonald / (United States) Tommy Paul

=== Alternate pairs ===
- (Italy) Salvatore Caruso / (Finland) Emil Ruusuvuori
- (South Africa) Lloyd Harris / (Austria) Julian Knowle
- (Italy) Gianluca Mager / (Japan) Yoshihito Nishioka
- (Slovakia) Andrej Martin / (Austria) Tristan-Samuel Weissborn

=== Withdrawals ===
- (Hungary) Attila Balázs / (Hungary) Márton Fucsovics
- (India) Rohan Bopanna / (Portugal) João Sousa
- (Australia) Alex Bolt / (Australia) Jordan Thompson
- (Italy) Salvatore Caruso / (Spain) Alejandro Davidovich Fokina
- (United States) Steve Johnson / (United States) Sam Querrey
- (South Africa) Raven Klaasen / (Japan) Ben McLachlan
- (Germany) Kevin Krawietz / (Germany) Andreas Mies

== See also ==
- 2021 Australian Open – Day-by-day summaries
