= 2021 Australian Open – Women's singles =

2021 tennis tournament

Women's singles
- 2021 Australian Open

Final
- Champion: (Japan) Naomi Osaka
- Runner-up: (United States) Jennifer Brady
- Score: 6–4, 6–3

Details
- Draw: 128 (16Q / 8WC)
- Seeds: 32

Events
| Singles | men | women | | boys | girls |
| Doubles | men | women | mixed | boys | girls |
| WC Singles | men | women | quad |
| WC Doubles | men | women | quad |
| Legends | men | women | mixed |
- Australian Open

Naomi Osaka defeated Jennifer Brady in the final, 6–4, 6–3 to win the women's singles tennis title at the 2021 Australian Open. It was her second Australian Open title and fourth major title overall. With the win, Osaka extended her winning streak to 21 matches, dating to the 2020 Cincinnati Open. She saved two match points en route to the title, in the fourth round against Garbiñe Muguruza. Osaka became the third player in the Open Era, after Monica Seles and Roger Federer, to win their first four major finals.

Sofia Kenin was the defending champion, but lost to Kaia Kanepi in the second round.

Venus Williams became the first player to win a match at a major after turning 40 since Martina Navratilova at the 2004 Wimbledon Championships.

Mayar Sherif became the first Egyptian woman to win a major main draw match. Hsieh Su-wei became the first Taiwanese woman to make a major singles quarterfinal. At 35 years of age, Hsieh also became the oldest player to make her quarterfinal debut.

Serena Williams equaled Chris Evert's all-time record of 54 major quarterfinals at this tournament; she then lost to Osaka in the semifinals. This was the seven-time champion's final appearance at the event, as Williams announced her retirement from professional tennis the following year.

== Seeds ==
Seeding per WTA rankings.

1. (Australia) Ashleigh Barty (quarterfinals)
2. (Romania) Simona Halep (quarterfinals)
3. (Japan) Naomi Osaka (champion)
4. (United States) Sofia Kenin (second round)
5. (Ukraine) Elina Svitolina (fourth round)
6. (Czech Republic) Karolína Plíšková (third round)
7. (Belarus) Aryna Sabalenka (fourth round)
8. (Canada) Bianca Andreescu (second round)
9. (Czech Republic) Petra Kvitová (second round)
10. (United States) Serena Williams (semifinals)
11. (Switzerland) Belinda Bencic (third round)
12. (Belarus) Victoria Azarenka (first round)
13. (United Kingdom) Johanna Konta (first round, retired)
14. (Spain) Garbiñe Muguruza (fourth round)
15. (Poland) Iga Świątek (fourth round)
16. (Croatia) Petra Martić (first round)

17. (Kazakhstan) Elena Rybakina (second round)
18. (Belgium) Elise Mertens (fourth round)
19. (Czech Republic) Markéta Vondroušová (fourth round)
20. (Greece) Maria Sakkari (first round)
21. (Estonia) Anett Kontaveit (third round)
22. (United States) Jennifer Brady (final)
23. (Germany) Angelique Kerber (first round)
24. (United States) Alison Riske (first round)
25. (Czech Republic) Karolína Muchová (semifinals)
26. (Kazakhstan) Yulia Putintseva (third round)
27. (Tunisia) Ons Jabeur (third round)
28. (Croatia) Donna Vekić (fourth round)
29. (Russia) Ekaterina Alexandrova (third round)
30. (China) Wang Qiang (first round)
31. (China) Zhang Shuai (first round)
32. (Russia) Veronika Kudermetova (third round)

Click on the seed number of a player to go to their draw section.

== Draw ==
Key

- Q = Qualifier
- WC = Wild card
- LL = Lucky loser
- Alt = Alternate
- ITF = ITF entry
- PR = Protected ranking
- SR = Special ranking
- SE = Special exempt
- JE = Junior exempt
- JR = Junior Accelerator Programme entrant
- CO = College Accelerator Programme entrant
- NG = Next Gen Accelerator Program entrant
- w/o = Walkover
- r = Retired
- d = Defaulted

=== Finals ===
Quarterfinals
1 | (Australia) Ashleigh Barty | 6 | 3 | 2
25 | (Czech Republic) Karolína Muchová | 1 | 6 | 6
22 | (United States) Jennifer Brady | 4 | 6 | 6
(United States) Jessica Pegula | 6 | 2 | 1
(Chinese Taipei) Hsieh Su-wei | 2 | 2
3 | (Japan) Naomi Osaka | 6 | 6
10 | (United States) Serena Williams | 6 | 6
2 | (Romania) Simona Halep | 3 | 3

Semifinals
25 | (Czech Republic) Karolína Muchová | 4 | 6 | 4
22 | (United States) Jennifer Brady | 6 | 3 | 6
3 | (Japan) Naomi Osaka | 6 | 6
10 | (United States) Serena Williams | 3 | 4

Final
22 | (United States) Jennifer Brady | 4 | 3
3 | (Japan) Naomi Osaka | 6 | 6

=== Top half ===
==== Section 1 ====
First round
1 | (Australia) A Barty | 6 | 6
(Montenegro) D Kovinić | 0 | 0
(Spain) S Sorribes Tormo | 1 | 5
WC | (Australia) D Gavrilova | 6 | 7
(China) S Zheng | 3 | 6 | 2
(Czech Republic) B Krejčíková | 6 | 2 | 6
(Italy) M Trevisan | 3 | 4
29 | (Russia) E Alexandrova | 6 | 6
21 | (Estonia) A Kontaveit | 7 | 6
(Belarus) A Sasnovich | 5 | 2
(Czech Republic) Kr Plíšková | 6^{4} | 6^{3}
(United Kingdom) H Watson | 7^{7} | 7^{7}
Q | (United Kingdom) F Jones | 4 | 1
(United States) S Rogers | 6 | 6
Q | (Serbia) O Danilović | 7 | 3 | 6
16 | (Croatia) P Martić | 5 | 6 | 4

Second round
1 | (Australia) A Barty | 6 | 7^{9}
WC | (Australia) D Gavrilova | 1 | 6^{7}
(Czech Republic) B Krejčíková | 3 | 6^{4}
29 | (Russia) E Alexandrova | 6 | 7^{7}
21 | (Estonia) A Kontaveit | 6^{5} | 6 | 6
(United Kingdom) H Watson | 7^{7} | 4 | 2
(United States) S Rogers | 6 | 6
Q | (Serbia) O Danilović | 2 | 3

Third round
1 | (Australia) A Barty | 6 | 6
29 | (Russia) E Alexandrova | 2 | 4
21 | (Estonia) A Kontaveit | 4 | 3
(United States) S Rogers | 6 | 6

Fourth round
1 | (Australia) A Barty | 6 | 6
(United States) S Rogers | 3 | 4

==== Section 2 ====
First round
11 | (Switzerland) B Bencic | 6 | 4 | 6
(United States) L Davis | 3 | 6 | 1
(Russia) S Kuznetsova | 6 | 6
(Czech Republic) B Strýcová | 2 | 2
(China) L Zhu | 6 | 6
Q | (United States) W Osuigwe | 1 | 1
(Canada) L Fernandez | 1 | 3
18 | (Belgium) E Mertens | 6 | 6
25 | (Czech Republic) K Muchová | 7 | 6
(Latvia) J Ostapenko | 5 | 2
PR | (Germany) M Barthel | 3 | 6 | 6
Q | (Italy) E Cocciaretto | 6 | 4 | 4
(United States) D Collins | 6 | 6
(Romania) A Bogdan | 3 | 1
(Italy) J Paolini | 0 | 2
6 | (Czech Republic) Ka Plíšková | 6 | 6

Second round
11 | (Switzerland) B Bencic | 7 | 2 | 6
(Russia) S Kuznetsova | 5 | 6 | 4
(China) L Zhu | 6^{8} | 1
18 | (Belgium) E Mertens | 7^{10} | 6
25 | (Czech Republic) K Muchová | 6 | 6
PR | (Germany) M Barthel | 4 | 1
(United States) D Collins | 5 | 2
6 | (Czech Republic) Ka Plíšková | 7 | 6

Third round
11 | (Switzerland) B Bencic | 2 | 1
18 | (Belgium) E Mertens | 6 | 6
25 | (Czech Republic) K Muchová | 7 | 7
6 | (Czech Republic) Ka Plíšková | 5 | 5

Fourth round
18 | (Belgium) E Mertens | 6^{5} | 5
25 | (Czech Republic) K Muchová | 7^{7} | 7

==== Section 3 ====
First round
4 | (United States) S Kenin | 7 | 6
WC | (Australia) M Inglis | 5 | 4
(Latvia) A Sevastova | 3 | 1
(Estonia) K Kanepi | 6 | 6
(Argentina) N Podoroska | 6 | 6
(United States) C McHale | 4 | 4
(China) Y Wang | 6 | 3 | 4
28 | (Croatia) D Vekić | 4 | 6 | 6
22 | (United States) J Brady | 6 | 6
(Spain) A Bolsova | 1 | 3
(United States) M Brengle | 6 | 6
WC | (Australia) Ar Rodionova | 1 | 2
Q | (France) C Paquet | 5 | 5
Q | (Egypt) M Sherif | 7 | 7
Q | (Slovenia) K Juvan | 4 | 2
13 | (United Kingdom) J Konta | 6 | 0^{r}

Second round
4 | (United States) S Kenin | 3 | 2
(Estonia) K Kanepi | 6 | 6
(Argentina) N Podoroska | 2 | 2
28 | (Croatia) D Vekić | 6 | 6
22 | (United States) J Brady | 6 | 6
(United States) M Brengle | 1 | 2
Q | (Egypt) M Sherif | 6 | 6^{2} | 3
Q | (Slovenia) K Juvan | 3 | 7^{7} | 6

Third round
(Estonia) K Kanepi | 7 | 6^{2} | 4
28 | (Croatia) D Vekić | 5 | 7^{7} | 6
22 | (United States) J Brady | 6 | 6
Q | (Slovenia) K Juvan | 1 | 3

Fourth round
28 | (Croatia) D Vekić | 1 | 5
22 | (United States) J Brady | 6 | 7

==== Section 4 ====
First round
12 | (Belarus) V Azarenka | 5 | 4
(United States) J Pegula | 7 | 6
WC | (Australia) D Aiava | 4 | 4
WC | (Australia) S Stosur | 6 | 6
(Japan) N Hibino | 2 | 6 | 7
WC | (Australia) A Sharma | 6 | 3 | 5
(France) K Mladenovic | 6 | 0 | 6
20 | (Greece) M Sakkari | 2 | 6 | 3
26 | (Kazakhstan) Y Putintseva | 4 | 6 | 6
(United States) S Stephens | 6 | 2 | 3
(Belgium) A Van Uytvanck | 4 | 6 | 6
Q | (France) C Burel | 6 | 3 | 4
(United States) C Gauff | 6 | 6
(Switzerland) J Teichmann | 3 | 2
(Czech Republic) M Bouzková | 3 | 6^{5}
5 | (Ukraine) E Svitolina | 6 | 7^{7}

Second round
(United States) J Pegula | 6 | 6
WC | (Australia) S Stosur | 0 | 1
(Japan) N Hibino | 5 | 1
(France) K Mladenovic | 7 | 6
26 | (Kazakhstan) Y Putintseva | 6 | 1 | 6
(Belgium) A Van Uytvanck | 4 | 6 | 2
(United States) C Gauff | 4 | 3
5 | (Ukraine) E Svitolina | 6 | 6

Third round
(United States) J Pegula | 6 | 6
(France) K Mladenovic | 2 | 1
26 | (Kazakhstan) Y Putintseva | 4 | 0
5 | (Ukraine) E Svitolina | 6 | 6

Fourth round
(United States) J Pegula | 6 | 3 | 6
5 | (Ukraine) E Svitolina | 4 | 6 | 3

=== Bottom half ===
==== Section 5 ====
First round
8 | (Canada) B Andreescu | 6 | 4 | 6
LL | (Romania) M Buzărnescu | 2 | 6 | 3
(Chinese Taipei) S-w Hsieh | 7 | 6
Q | (Bulgaria) T Pironkova | 5 | 2
(Belgium) K Flipkens | 5 | 2
(United States) V Williams | 7 | 6
Q | (Italy) S Errani | 2 | 6 | 6
30 | (China) Q Wang | 6 | 4 | 4
19 | (Czech Republic) M Vondroušová | 2 | 7 | 7
(Sweden) R Peterson | 6 | 5 | 5
Q | (Canada) R Marino | 6 | 7^{11}
WC | (Australia) K Birrell | 0 | 6^{9}
(Romania) PM Țig | 2 | 1
(Romania) S Cîrstea | 6 | 6
Q | (Belgium) G Minnen | 3 | 4
9 | (Czech Republic) P Kvitová | 6 | 6

Second round
8 | (Canada) B Andreescu | 3 | 2
(Chinese Taipei) S-w Hsieh | 6 | 6
(United States) V Williams | 1 | 0
Q | (Italy) S Errani | 6 | 6
19 | (Czech Republic) M Vondroušová | 6 | 7
Q | (Canada) R Marino | 1 | 5
(Romania) S Cîrstea | 6 | 1 | 6
9 | (Czech Republic) P Kvitová | 4 | 6 | 1

Third round
(Chinese Taipei) S-w Hsieh | 6 | 2 | 7
Q | (Italy) S Errani | 4 | 6 | 5
19 | (Czech Republic) M Vondroušová | 6 | 6
(Romania) S Cîrstea | 2 | 4

Fourth round
(Chinese Taipei) S-w Hsieh | 6 | 6
19 | (Czech Republic) M Vondroušová | 4 | 2

==== Section 6 ====
First round
14 | (Spain) G Muguruza | 6 | 6
LL | (Russia) M Gasparyan | 4 | 0
Q | (Russia) L Samsonova | 6^{4} | 7^{7} | 7
(Spain) P Badosa | 7^{7} | 6^{4} | 5
(Kazakhstan) Z Diyas | 6 | 7
(Slovenia) T Zidanšek | 2 | 5
(United States) B Pera | 6 | 6
23 | (Germany) A Kerber | 0 | 4
27 | (Tunisia) O Jabeur | 6 | 3 | 6
(Germany) A Petkovic | 3 | 6 | 4
Q | (Japan) M Hibi | 6^{2} | 4
LL | (Slovakia) AK Schmiedlová | 7^{7} | 6
(Slovenia) P Hercog | 6^{6} | 3
(France) C Garcia | 7^{8} | 6
(Russia) A Pavlyuchenkova | 1 | 2
3 | (Japan) N Osaka | 6 | 6

Second round
14 | (Spain) G Muguruza | 6 | 6
Q | (Russia) L Samsonova | 3 | 1
(Kazakhstan) Z Diyas | 6 | 3 | 6
(United States) B Pera | 4 | 6 | 3
27 | (Tunisia) O Jabeur | 6 | 6
LL | (Slovakia) AK Schmiedlová | 3 | 2
(France) C Garcia | 2 | 3
3 | (Japan) N Osaka | 6 | 6

Third round
14 | (Spain) G Muguruza | 6 | 6
(Kazakhstan) Z Diyas | 1 | 1
27 | (Tunisia) O Jabeur | 3 | 2
3 | (Japan) N Osaka | 6 | 6

Fourth round
14 | (Spain) G Muguruza | 6 | 4 | 5
3 | (Japan) N Osaka | 4 | 6 | 7

==== Section 7 ====
First round
7 | (Belarus) A Sabalenka | 6 | 6
(Slovakia) V Kužmová | 0 | 4
PR | (United Kingdom) K Boulter | 1 | 4
(Russia) D Kasatkina | 6 | 6
(France) A Cornet | 6 | 4 | 7^{10}
Q | (Russia) V Savinykh | 2 | 6 | 6^{7}
(United States) A Li | 6 | 6
31 | (China) S Zhang | 2 | 0
24 | (United States) A Riske | 2 | 1
(Russia) A Potapova | 6 | 6
Q | (Hungary) T Babos | 7^{7} | 6
LL | (Belgium) Y Bonaventure | 6^{0} | 4
(Serbia) N Stojanović | 6 | 6
(Romania) I-C Begu | 3 | 4
(Germany) L Siegemund | 1 | 1
10 | (United States) S Williams | 6 | 6

Second round
7 | (Belarus) A Sabalenka | 7^{7} | 6
(Russia) D Kasatkina | 6^{5} | 3
(France) A Cornet | 2 | 6^{6}
(United States) A Li | 6 | 7^{8}
(Russia) A Potapova | 6 | 6
Q | (Hungary) T Babos | 2 | 4
(Serbia) N Stojanović | 3 | 0
10 | (United States) S Williams | 6 | 6

Third round
7 | (Belarus) A Sabalenka | 6 | 6
(United States) A Li | 3 | 1
(Russia) A Potapova | 6^{5} | 2
10 | (United States) S Williams | 7^{7} | 6

Fourth round
7 | (Belarus) A Sabalenka | 4 | 6 | 4
10 | (United States) S Williams | 6 | 2 | 6

==== Section 8 ====
First round
15 | (Poland) I Świątek | 6 | 6
(Netherlands) A Rus | 1 | 3
PR | (Kazakhstan) Y Shvedova | 3 | 3
(Italy) C Giorgi | 6 | 6
(France) F Ferro | 6^{5} | 6 | 6
(Czech Republic) K Siniaková | 7^{7} | 2 | 4
PR | (Russia) V Zvonareva | 6 | 4 | 4
17 | (Kazakhstan) E Rybakina | 4 | 6 | 6
32 | (Russia) V Kudermetova | 6 | 7^{7}
(Ukraine) M Kostyuk | 2 | 6^{5}
(Russia) V Gracheva | 6 | 3 | 7^{10}
(Russia) A Blinkova | 1 | 6 | 6^{7}
(Japan) M Doi | 2 | 1
(Australia) A Tomljanović | 6 | 6
WC | (Australia) L Cabrera | 2 | 1
2 | (Romania) S Halep | 6 | 6

Second round
15 | (Poland) I Świątek | 6 | 6
(Italy) C Giorgi | 2 | 4
(France) F Ferro | 6 | 6
17 | (Kazakhstan) E Rybakina | 4 | 4
32 | (Russia) V Kudermetova | 5 | 6 | 6
(Russia) V Gracheva | 7 | 2 | 2
(Australia) A Tomljanović | 6 | 4 | 5
2 | (Romania) S Halep | 4 | 6 | 7

Third round
15 | (Poland) I Świątek | 6 | 6
(France) F Ferro | 4 | 3
32 | (Russia) V Kudermetova | 1 | 3
2 | (Romania) S Halep | 6 | 6

Fourth round
15 | (Poland) I Świątek | 6 | 1 | 4
2 | (Romania) S Halep | 3 | 6 | 6

== Other entry information ==
=== Wild cards ===
- (Australia) Destanee Aiava
- (Australia) Kimberly Birrell
- (Australia) Lizette Cabrera
- (Australia) Daria Gavrilova
- (Australia) Maddison Inglis
- (Australia) Arina Rodionova
- (Australia) Astra Sharma
- (Australia) Samantha Stosur

=== Protected ranking ===
- (Kazakhstan) Yaroslava Shvedova (47)
- (Russia) Vera Zvonareva (78)
- (United Kingdom) Katie Boulter (85)
- (Germany) Mona Barthel (101)

=== Qualifiers ===
- (Hungary) Tímea Babos
- (France) Clara Burel
- (Italy) Elisabetta Cocciaretto
- (Serbia) Olga Danilović
- (Italy) Sara Errani
- (Japan) Mayo Hibi
- (United Kingdom) Francesca Jones
- (Slovenia) Kaja Juvan
- (Canada) Rebecca Marino
- (Belgium) Greet Minnen
- (United States) Whitney Osuigwe
- (France) Chloé Paquet
- (Bulgaria) Tsvetana Pironkova
- (Russia) Liudmila Samsonova
- (Russia) Valeria Savinykh
- (Egypt) Mayar Sherif

=== Lucky losers ===
- (Belgium) Ysaline Bonaventure
- (Romania) Mihaela Buzărnescu
- (Russia) Margarita Gasparyan
- (Slovakia) Anna Karolína Schmiedlová

=== Potential lucky losers ===
1. (Ukraine) Lesia Tsurenko (did not play)
2. (Russia) Kamilla Rakhimova (did not play)
3. (United States) Varvara Lepchenko (did not play)
4. (India) Ankita Raina (did not play)

=== Withdrawals ===
- † (Spain) Carla Suárez Navarro (83) → replaced by (Germany) Mona Barthel (101 PR)
- † (United States) Taylor Townsend (89) → replaced by (Germany) Andrea Petkovic (102)
- ‡ (Netherlands) Kiki Bertens (9) → replaced by (Spain) Aliona Bolsova (103) (Note: Last direct acceptance)
- ∆ (United States) Amanda Anisimova (30) → replaced by (Belgium) Ysaline Bonaventure (LL)
- ∆ (Poland) Magda Linette (40) → replaced by (Russia) Margarita Gasparyan (LL)
- ∆ (United States) Madison Keys (16) → replaced by (Slovakia) Anna Karolína Schmiedlová (LL)
- Ω (Ukraine) Dayana Yastremska (suspension by ITF, upheld by CAS) (29) → replaced by (Romania) Mihaela Buzărnescu (LL)

† – not included on entry list
‡ – withdrew from entry list before qualifying began
∆ – withdrew from entry list during qualifying
Ω – withdrew from entry list during a mandatory 14-day quarantine period

== Championship match statistics ==
| Category | (Japan) Osaka | (United States) Brady |
|---|---|---|
| 1st serve % | 30/63 (48%) | 29/60 (48%) |
| 1st serve points won | 22 of 30 = 73% | 18 of 29 = 62% |
| 2nd serve points won | 18 of 33 = 55% | 13 of 31 = 42% |
| Total service points won | 40 of 63 = 63.49% | 31 of 60 = 51.67% |
| Aces | 6 | 2 |
| Double faults | 2 | 4 |
| Winners | 16 | 15 |
| Unforced errors | 24 | 31 |
| Net points won | 4 of 5 = 80% | 2 of 3 = 67% |
| Break points converted | 4 of 5 = 80% | 2 of 4 = 50% |
| Return points won | 25 of 60 = 42% | 21 of 63 = 33% |
| Total points won | 69 | 54 |

== See also ==
- 2021 Australian Open – Day-by-day summaries
- 2021 WTA Tour
- International Tennis Federation

== Explanatory notes ==
| Preceded by 2020 French Open – Women's singles | Grand Slam women's singles | Succeeded by 2021 French Open – Women's singles |
