= 2021 Australian Open – Mixed doubles =

Mixed doubles
- 2021 Australian Open

Final
- Champions: (Czech Republic) Barbora Krejčíková (United States) Rajeev Ram
- Runners-up: (Australia) Samantha Stosur (Australia) Matthew Ebden
- Score: 6–1, 6–4

Details
- Draw: 32
- Seeds: 8

Events
Singles	men	women		boys	girls
Doubles	men	women	mixed	boys	girls
WC Singles	men	women	quad
WC Doubles	men	women	quad
Legends	men	women	mixed
- Australian Open

Two-time defending champion Barbora Krejčíková and her partner Rajeev Ram defeated Samantha Stosur and Matthew Ebden in the final, 6–1, 6–4 to win the mixed doubles tennis title at the 2021 Australian Open. It was the pair's second major mixed doubles title as a team, after their first at the 2019 Australian Open. They saved a match point en route to the title, in the second round against Ena Shibahara and Ben McLachlan.

Krejčíková and Nikola Mektić were the defending champions, but chose to play separately this year. Mektić partnered Barbora Strýcová, but was defeated in the first round by Hayley Carter and Sander Gillé.

After not being held at the 2020 US Open and postponed 2020 French Open due to the COVID-19 pandemic, this year's tournament marked the return of mixed doubles to a Grand Slam tournament.

== Seeds ==
1. (Czech Republic) Barbora Strýcová / (Croatia) Nikola Mektić (first round)
2. (United States) Nicole Melichar / (Colombia) Robert Farah (second round, withdrew)
3. (Canada) Gabriela Dabrowski / (Croatia) Mate Pavić (quarterfinals)
4. (Chinese Taipei) Chan Hao-ching / (Colombia) Juan Sebastián Cabal (first round)
5. (Netherlands) Demi Schuurs / (Netherlands) Wesley Koolhof (first round)
6. (Czech Republic) Barbora Krejčíková / (United States) Rajeev Ram (champions)
7. (Chinese Taipei) Latisha Chan / (Croatia) Ivan Dodig (first round)
8. (Brazil) Luisa Stefani / (Brazil) Bruno Soares (second round)

== Draw ==
Key

- Q = Qualifier
- WC = Wild card
- LL = Lucky loser
- Alt = Alternate
- ITF = ITF entry
- PR = Protected ranking
- SR = Special ranking
- SE = Special exempt
- JE = Junior exempt
- JR = Junior Accelerator Programme entrant
- CO = College Accelerator Programme entrant
- NG = Next Gen Accelerator Program entrant
- w/o = Walkover
- r = Retired
- d = Defaulted

=== Finals ===
Semifinals
WC	(Australia) Samantha Stosur (Australia) Matthew Ebden	7	5	[10]
(United States) Desirae Krawczyk (United Kingdom) Joe Salisbury	5	7	[8]
6	(Czech Republic) Barbora Krejčíková (United States) Rajeev Ram	6	6
WC	(Australia) Storm Sanders (Australia) Marc Polmans	3	3

Final
WC	(Australia) Samantha Stosur (Australia) Matthew Ebden	1	4
6	(Czech Republic) Barbora Krejčíková (United States) Rajeev Ram	6	6

=== Top half ===
First round
1	(Czech Republic) B Strýcová (Croatia) N Mektić	4	7	[4]
Alt	(United States) H Carter (Belgium) S Gillé	6	5	[10]
(Poland) I Świątek (Poland) Ł Kubot	5	7^{8}	[10]
WC	(Australia) A Sharma (Australia) J-P Smith	7	6^{6}	[6]
WC	(Australia) S Stosur (Australia) M Ebden	6	6
(Kazakhstan) E Rybakina (Kazakhstan) A Bublik	1	4
(Latvia) J Ostapenko (Netherlands) M Middelkoop	5	4
8	(Brazil) L Stefani (Brazil) B Soares	7	6
4	(Chinese Taipei) H-c Chan (Colombia) JS Cabal	4	6	[7]
(United States) D Krawczyk (United Kingdom) J Salisbury	6	3	[10]
(China) Y Xu (Argentina) M González	6	3	[7]
(Russia) V Zvonareva (Brazil) M Melo	4	6	[10]
WC	(Australia) B Woolcock (Australia) J Peers	2	7	[10]
(Slovenia) A Klepač (United Kingdom) N Skupski	6	5	[12]
(Czech Republic) L Hradecká (Slovakia) F Polášek	6	7
7	(Chinese Taipei) L Chan (Croatia) I Dodig	4	5

Second round
Alt	(United States) H Carter (Belgium) S Gillé	6	6
(Poland) I Świątek (Poland) Ł Kubot	4	1
WC	(Australia) S Stosur (Australia) M Ebden	6	6
8	(Brazil) L Stefani (Brazil) B Soares	3	1
(United States) D Krawczyk (United Kingdom) J Salisbury	6	6
(Russia) V Zvonareva (Brazil) M Melo	4	4
(Slovenia) A Klepač (United Kingdom) N Skupski	6^{3}	7^{7}	[10]
(Czech Republic) L Hradecká (Slovakia) F Polášek	7^{7}	6^{5}	[8]

Quarterfinals
Alt	(United States) H Carter (Belgium) S Gillé	3	2
WC	(Australia) S Stosur (Australia) M Ebden	6	6
(United States) D Krawczyk (United Kingdom) J Salisbury	6	6
(Slovenia) A Klepač (United Kingdom) N Skupski	3	4

Semifinals
WC	(Australia) S Stosur (Australia) M Ebden	7	5	[10]
(United States) D Krawczyk (United Kingdom) J Salisbury	5	7	[8]

=== Bottom half ===
First round
6	(Czech Republic) B Krejčíková (United States) R Ram	7^{8}	7
(Kazakhstan) Y Shvedova (Finland) H Kontinen	6^{6}	5
(Germany) L Siegemund (Germany) K Krawietz	6^{3}	4
(Japan) E Shibahara (Japan) B McLachlan	7^{7}	6
(United States) B Mattek-Sands (United Kingdom) J Murray	6	6
(China) Y Duan (India) R Bopanna	4	4
WC	(Australia) I Popovic (Australia) A Vukic	1	1
3	(Canada) G Dabrowski (Croatia) M Pavić	6	6
5	(Netherlands) D Schuurs (Netherlands) W Koolhof	3	6	[9]
WC	(Australia) S Sanders (Australia) M Polmans	6	3	[11]
WC	(Australia) E Perez (Australia) A Harris	7	7^{8}
WC	(United States) A Muhammad (Australia) L Saville	5	6^{6}
WC	(Australia) Ar Rodionova (Australia) M Purcell	7	6
(Chile) A Guarachi (New Zealand) M Venus	5	4
(United States) C Dolehide (France) F Martin	4	4
2	(United States) N Melichar (Colombia) R Farah	6	6

Second round
6	(Czech Republic) B Krejčíková (United States) R Ram	6	3	[13]
(Japan) E Shibahara (Japan) B McLachlan	4	6	[11]
(United States) B Mattek-Sands (United Kingdom) J Murray	6^{7}	7	[3]
3	(Canada) G Dabrowski (Croatia) M Pavić	7^{9}	5	[10]
WC	(Australia) S Sanders (Australia) M Polmans	6	6^{4}	[10]
WC	(Australia) E Perez (Australia) A Harris	4	7^{7}	[8]
WC	(Australia) Ar Rodionova (Australia) M Purcell	w/o
2	(United States) N Melichar (Colombia) R Farah

Quarterfinals
6	(Czech Republic) B Krejčíková (United States) R Ram	7^{7}	6
3	(Canada) G Dabrowski (Croatia) M Pavić	6^{3}	3
WC	(Australia) S Sanders (Australia) M Polmans	4	7	[10]
WC	(Australia) Ar Rodionova (Australia) M Purcell	6	5	[8]

Semifinals
6	(Czech Republic) B Krejčíková (United States) R Ram	6	6
WC	(Australia) S Sanders (Australia) M Polmans	3	3

== Other entry information ==
=== Wild cards ===
- (United States) Asia Muhammad / (Australia) Luke Saville
- (Australia) Ellen Perez / (Australia) Andrew Harris
- (Australia) Ivana Popovic / (Australia) Aleksandar Vukic
- (Australia) Arina Rodionova / (Australia) Max Purcell
- (Australia) Storm Sanders / (Australia) Marc Polmans
- (Australia) Astra Sharma / (Australia) John-Patrick Smith
- (Australia) Samantha Stosur / (Australia) Matthew Ebden
- (Australia) Belinda Woolcock / (Australia) John Peers

=== Alternate pairs ===
- (United States) Hayley Carter / (Belgium) Sander Gillé

=== Withdrawals ===
- (Argentina) Nadia Podoroska / (Argentina) Horacio Zeballos

== See also ==
- 2021 Australian Open – Day-by-day summaries
