= 2021 Australian Open – Women's doubles =

Women's doubles
- 2021 Australian Open

Final
- Champions: (Belgium) Elise Mertens (Belarus) Aryna Sabalenka
- Runners-up: (Czech Republic) Barbora Krejčíková (Czech Republic) Kateřina Siniaková
- Score: 6–2, 6–3

Details
- Draw: 64
- Seeds: 16

Events
Singles	men	women		boys	girls
Doubles	men	women	mixed	boys	girls
WC Singles	men	women	quad
WC Doubles	men	women	quad
Legends	men	women	mixed
- Australian Open

Elise Mertens and Aryna Sabalenka defeated Barbora Krejčíková and Kateřina Siniaková in the final, 6–2, 6–3, to win the women's doubles tennis title at the 2021 Australian Open. It was their second major doubles title as a team, after the 2019 US Open. With the win, Sabalenka claimed the world No. 1 doubles ranking.

Tímea Babos and Kristina Mladenovic were the reigning champions, but withdrew from the tournament.

== Seeds ==
1. (Chinese Taipei) Hsieh Su-wei / (Czech Republic) Barbora Strýcová (second round)
2. (Belgium) Elise Mertens / (Belarus) Aryna Sabalenka (champions)
3. (Czech Republic) Barbora Krejčíková / (Czech Republic) Kateřina Siniaková (final)
4. (United States) Nicole Melichar / (Netherlands) Demi Schuurs (semifinals)
5. (Chinese Taipei) Chan Hao-ching / (Chinese Taipei) Latisha Chan (first round)
6. (Canada) Gabriela Dabrowski / (United States) Bethanie Mattek-Sands (second round)
7. (Japan) Shuko Aoyama / (Japan) Ena Shibahara (quarterfinals)
8. (China) Duan Yingying / (China) Zheng Saisai (first round)

9. (Chile) Alexa Guarachi / (United States) Desirae Krawczyk (third round)
10. (Australia) Samantha Stosur / (China) Zhang Shuai (first round)
11. (China) Xu Yifan / (China) Yang Zhaoxuan (second round)
12. (United States) Hayley Carter / (Brazil) Luisa Stefani (third round)
13. (Ukraine) Lyudmyla Kichenok / (Latvia) Jeļena Ostapenko (third round)
14. (Belgium) Kirsten Flipkens / (Slovenia) Andreja Klepač (second round)
15. (Russia) Anna Blinkova / (Russia) Veronika Kudermetova (first round)
16. (Germany) Laura Siegemund / (Russia) Vera Zvonareva (third round)

Click on the seed number of a player to go to their draw section.

== Draw ==
Key

- Q = Qualifier
- WC = Wild card
- LL = Lucky loser
- Alt = Alternate
- ITF = ITF entry
- PR = Protected ranking
- SR = Special ranking
- SE = Special exempt
- JE = Junior exempt
- JR = Junior Accelerator Programme entrant
- CO = College Accelerator Programme entrant
- NG = Next Gen Accelerator Program entrant
- w/o = Walkover
- r = Retired
- d = Defaulted

=== Finals ===
Quarterfinals
(Croatia) Darija Jurak (Serbia) Nina Stojanović	6^{3}	6	6
PR	(Serbia) Aleksandra Krunić (Italy) Martina Trevisan	7^{7}	3	2
3	(Czech Republic) Barbora Krejčíková (Czech Republic) Kateřina Siniaková	7	5	6
(Canada) Sharon Fichman (Mexico) Giuliana Olmos	5	7	2
(United States) Coco Gauff (United States) Caty McNally	6^{4}	1
4	(United States) Nicole Melichar (Netherlands) Demi Schuurs	7^{7}	6
7	(Japan) Shuko Aoyama (Japan) Ena Shibahara	2	0
2	(Belgium) Elise Mertens (Belarus) Aryna Sabalenka	6	6

Semifinals
(Croatia) Darija Jurak (Serbia) Nina Stojanović	6	2	4
3	(Czech Republic) Barbora Krejčíková (Czech Republic) Kateřina Siniaková	3	6	6
4	(United States) Nicole Melichar (Netherlands) Demi Schuurs	5	4
2	(Belgium) Elise Mertens (Belarus) Aryna Sabalenka	7	6

Final
3	(Czech Republic) Barbora Krejčíková (Czech Republic) Kateřina Siniaková	2	3
2	(Belgium) Elise Mertens (Belarus) Aryna Sabalenka	6	6

=== Top half ===
==== Section 1 ====
First round
1	(Chinese Taipei) S-w Hsieh (Czech Republic) B Strýcová	6	5	6
WC	(Australia) D Aiava (Australia) A Sharma	4	7	4
(Croatia) D Jurak (Serbia) N Stojanović	6	5	6
(Romania) I-C Begu (Argentina) N Podoroska	0	7	2
(Spain) A Bolsova (Italy) J Paolini	7^{7}	6
(Russia) D Kasatkina (Estonia) A Kontaveit	6^{2}	2
(Spain) G García Pérez (Georgia (country)) O Kalashnikova	5	4
14	(Belgium) K Flipkens (Slovenia) A Klepač	7	6
11	(China) Y Xu (China) Z Yang	6	2	6
(Russia) A Pavlyuchenkova (Latvia) A Sevastova	3	6	3
(Russia) A Kalinskaya (Slovakia) V Kužmová	6	6
(Kazakhstan) Z Diyas (Kazakhstan) Y Putintseva	4	2
(Ukraine) M Kostyuk (Belarus) A Sasnovich	1	6	1
PR	(Germany) M Barthel (China) L Zhu	6	3	6
PR	(Serbia) A Krunić (Italy) M Trevisan	6	6
8	(China) Y Duan (China) S Zheng	1	3

Second round
1	(Chinese Taipei) S-w Hsieh (Czech Republic) B Strýcová	6^{5}	6	5
(Croatia) D Jurak (Serbia) N Stojanović	7^{7}	3	7
(Spain) A Bolsova (Italy) J Paolini	7^{7}	3	7
14	(Belgium) K Flipkens (Slovenia) A Klepač	6^{3}	6	5
11	(China) Y Xu (China) Z Yang	6	6^{1}	2
(Russia) A Kalinskaya (Slovakia) V Kužmová	2	7^{7}	6
PR	(Germany) M Barthel (China) L Zhu	4	6	3
PR	(Serbia) A Krunić (Italy) M Trevisan	6	2	6

Third round
(Croatia) D Jurak (Serbia) N Stojanović	1	7	6
(Spain) A Bolsova (Italy) J Paolini	6	5	3
(Russia) A Kalinskaya (Slovakia) V Kužmová	4	3
PR	(Serbia) A Krunić (Italy) M Trevisan	6	6

Quarterfinals
(Croatia) D Jurak (Serbia) N Stojanović	6^{3}	6	6
PR	(Serbia) A Krunić (Italy) M Trevisan	7^{7}	3	2

==== Section 2 ====
First round
3	(Czech Republic) B Krejčíková (Czech Republic) K Siniaková	6	6
(Romania) A Bogdan (Sweden) R Peterson	3	1
WC	(Australia) D Gavrilova (Australia) E Perez	6^{4}	4
(Tunisia) O Jabeur (United States) C McHale	7^{7}	6
(Netherlands) A Rus (Slovenia) T Zidanšek	6	6^{5}	7
(United States) A Riske (Australia) A Tomljanović	1	7^{7}	5
(United States) B Pera (Netherlands) R van der Hoek	3	6	7
15	(Russia) A Blinkova (Russia) V Kudermetova	6	3	5
10	(Australia) S Stosur (China) S Zhang	4	6	2
(Canada) LA Fernandez (United Kingdom) H Watson	6	3	6
WC	(Australia) O Gadecki (Australia) B Woolcock	6	6
(Romania) M Buzărnescu (India) A Raina	3	0
(Russia) E Alexandrova (Russia) Y Sizikova	3	3
(Czech Republic) L Hradecká (Czech Republic) Kr Plíšková	6	6
(Canada) S Fichman (Mexico) G Olmos	1	7^{7}	6
5	(Chinese Taipei) H-c Chan (Chinese Taipei) L Chan	6	6^{1}	2

Second round
3	(Czech Republic) B Krejčíková (Czech Republic) K Siniaková	6	6
(Tunisia) O Jabeur (United States) C McHale	3	4
(Netherlands) A Rus (Slovenia) T Zidanšek	4	4
(United States) B Pera (Netherlands) R van der Hoek	6	6
(Canada) LA Fernandez (United Kingdom) H Watson	7	6
WC	(Australia) O Gadecki (Australia) B Woolcock	5	2
(Czech Republic) L Hradecká (Czech Republic) Kr Plíšková	5	3
(Canada) S Fichman (Mexico) G Olmos	7	6

Third round
3	(Czech Republic) B Krejčíková (Czech Republic) K Siniaková	6	6
(United States) B Pera (Netherlands) R van der Hoek	4	4
(Canada) LA Fernandez (United Kingdom) H Watson	3	2
(Canada) S Fichman (Mexico) G Olmos	6	6

Quarterfinals
3	(Czech Republic) B Krejčíková (Czech Republic) K Siniaková	7	5	6
(Canada) S Fichman (Mexico) G Olmos	5	7	2

=== Bottom half ===
==== Section 3 ====
First round
6	(Canada) G Dabrowski (United States) B Mattek-Sands	6	6
(Spain) L Arruabarrena (United States) K Christian	2	3
(United States) C Dolehide (United States) S Rogers	3	4
(United States) C Gauff (United States) C McNally	6	6
WC	(Romania) S Halep (Australia) C Kempenaers-Pocz	4	5
(Australia) Ar Rodionova (Australia) S Sanders	6	7
(Switzerland) B Bencic (United States) S Kenin	3	6	6^{5}
9	(Chile) A Guarachi (United States) D Krawczyk	6	2	7^{10}
13	(Ukraine) L Kichenok (Latvia) J Ostapenko	7^{7}	6
(Japan) M Ninomiya (United States) S Santamaria	6^{2}	4
(Romania) A Mitu (Romania) R Olaru	3	6	6
(Romania) M Niculescu (Romania) PM Țig	6	3	3
PR	(Belarus) V Lapko (Czech Republic) M Vondroušová	6	6
(United States) M Brengle (United States) L Davis	4	0
(France) F Ferro (Switzerland) J Teichmann	2^{r}
4	(United States) N Melichar (Netherlands) D Schuurs	3

Second round
6	(Canada) G Dabrowski (United States) B Mattek-Sands	1	2
(United States) C Gauff (United States) C McNally	6	6
(Australia) Ar Rodionova (Australia) S Sanders	1	7	5
9	(Chile) A Guarachi (United States) D Krawczyk	6	5	7
13	(Ukraine) L Kichenok (Latvia) J Ostapenko	6	1	6
(Romania) A Mitu (Romania) R Olaru	1	6	1
PR	(Belarus) V Lapko (Czech Republic) M Vondroušová	2	4
4	(United States) N Melichar (Netherlands) D Schuurs	6	6

Third round
(United States) C Gauff (United States) C McNally	7	6
9	(Chile) A Guarachi (United States) D Krawczyk	5	3
13	(Ukraine) L Kichenok (Latvia) J Ostapenko	2	4
4	(United States) N Melichar (Netherlands) D Schuurs	6	6

Quarterfinals
(United States) C Gauff (United States) C McNally	6^{4}	1
4	(United States) N Melichar (Netherlands) D Schuurs	7^{7}	6

==== Section 4 ====
First round
7	(Japan) S Aoyama (Japan) E Shibahara	4	7	6
(United States) A Muhammad (United States) J Pegula	6	5	3
WC	(Australia) L Cabrera (Australia) M Inglis	7^{7}	4	7^{12}
(Czech Republic) R Voráčová (China) Y Wang	6^{3}	6	6^{10}
(Spain) P Badosa (Montenegro) D Kovinić	6	4	7^{10}
(Japan) M Doi (Japan) N Hibino	2	6	6^{7}
PR	(Kazakhstan) E Rybakina (Kazakhstan) Y Shvedova	4	3
12	(United States) H Carter (Brazil) L Stefani	6	6
16	(Germany) L Siegemund (Russia) V Zvonareva	6	6
WC	(Australia) K Birrell (Australia) J Fourlis	2	1
PR	(Ukraine) K Bondarenko (Ukraine) N Kichenok	5	6	6
(Czech Republic) M Bouzková (Spain) S Sorribes Tormo	7	4	0
(Australia) A Barty (United States) J Brady	6	6
WC	(Australia) A Myers (Australia) I Popovic	2	4
(Sweden) C Lister (Belgium) A Van Uytvanck	6	5	4
2	(Belgium) E Mertens (Belarus) A Sabalenka	3	7	6

Second round
7	(Japan) S Aoyama (Japan) E Shibahara	5	7^{7}	6
WC	(Australia) L Cabrera (Australia) M Inglis	7	6^{5}	0
(Spain) P Badosa (Montenegro) D Kovinić	6	0	1
12	(United States) H Carter (Brazil) L Stefani	4	6	6
16	(Germany) L Siegemund (Russia) V Zvonareva	6	6
PR	(Ukraine) K Bondarenko (Ukraine) N Kichenok	4	2
(Australia) A Barty (United States) J Brady
2	(Belgium) E Mertens (Belarus) A Sabalenka	w/o

Third round
7	(Japan) S Aoyama (Japan) E Shibahara	6	6
12	(United States) H Carter (Brazil) L Stefani	2	4
16	(Germany) L Siegemund (Russia) V Zvonareva	3	7^{7}	2
2	(Belgium) E Mertens (Belarus) A Sabalenka	6	6^{5}	6

Quarterfinals
7	(Japan) S Aoyama (Japan) E Shibahara	2	0
2	(Belgium) E Mertens (Belarus) A Sabalenka	6	6

== Other entry information ==
=== Wild cards ===
- (Australia) Destanee Aiava / (Australia) Astra Sharma
- (Australia) Kimberly Birrell / (Australia) Jaimee Fourlis
- (Australia) Lizette Cabrera / (Australia) Maddison Inglis
- (Australia) Olivia Gadecki / (Australia) Belinda Woolcock
- (Australia) Daria Gavrilova / (Australia) Ellen Perez
- (Romania) Simona Halep / (Australia) Charlotte Kempenaers-Pocz
- (Australia) Abbie Myers / (Australia) Ivana Popovic

=== Protected ranking ===
- (Germany) Mona Barthel / (China) Zhu Lin
- (Ukraine) Kateryna Bondarenko / (Ukraine) Nadiia Kichenok
- (Serbia) Aleksandra Krunić / (Italy) Martina Trevisan
- (Belarus) Vera Lapko / (Czech Republic) Markéta Vondroušová
- (Kazakhstan) Elena Rybakina / (Kazakhstan) Yaroslava Shvedova

=== Withdrawals ===
- (United States) Amanda Anisimova / (Czech Republic) Markéta Vondroušová
- (Hungary) Tímea Babos / (France) Kristina Mladenovic
- (Germany) Mona Barthel / (Germany) Anna-Lena Friedsam
- (France) Alizé Cornet / (United Kingdom) Heather Watson
- (China) Han Xinyun / (China) Zhu Lin
- (Belarus) Vera Lapko / (Ukraine) Dayana Yastremska
- (Poland) Magda Linette / (United States) Bernarda Pera
- (Czech Republic) Květa Peschke / (Netherlands) Rosalie van der Hoek

== See also ==
- 2021 Australian Open – Day-by-day summaries
