= 2021 Australian Open – Wheelchair quad doubles =

Wheelchair quad doubles
- 2021 Australian Open

Final
- Champions: (Australia) Dylan Alcott (Australia) Heath Davidson
- Runners-up: (United Kingdom) Andy Lapthorne (United States) David Wagner
- Score: 6–2, 3–6, [10–7]

Events
| Singles | men | women | | boys | girls |
| Doubles | men | women | mixed | boys | girls |
| WC Singles | men | women | quad |
| WC Doubles | men | women | quad |
| Legends | men | women | mixed |
- Australian Open

Three-time defending champions Dylan Alcott and Heath Davidson defeated Andy Lapthorne and David Wagner in the final, 6–2, 3–6, [10–7] to win the quad doubles wheelchair tennis title at the 2021 Australian Open.

For the first time in major history, the draw was increased from four to eight players. The wheelchair quad doubles competition, consisting of a semifinal round and a championship match, began on 15 February. It featured the same field of eight players contesting the singles competition. Two of the four pairs were seeded, with the Australian duo of Alcott and Davidson receiving the top seed and the pair of Lapthorne and Wagner getting the second seed. Both seeded pairs won their semifinal matches in straight sets; Alcott/Davidson defeated Sam Schröder/Niels Vink and Lapthorne/Wagner defeated Koji Sugeno/Nicholas Taylor. The championship match, a rematch of the 2020 final, was held on 16 February with Alcott and Davidson winning in a match tiebreaker.

== Seeds ==
1. (Australia) Dylan Alcott / (Australia) Heath Davidson (champions)
2. (United Kingdom) Andy Lapthorne / (United States) David Wagner (final)

== Draw ==
Key

- Q = Qualifier
- WC = Wild card
- LL = Lucky loser
- Alt = Alternate
- ITF = ITF entry
- PR = Protected ranking
- SR = Special ranking
- SE = Special exempt
- JE = Junior exempt
- JR = Junior Accelerator Programme entrant
- CO = College Accelerator Programme entrant
- NG = Next Gen Accelerator Program entrant
- w/o = Walkover
- r = Retired
- d = Defaulted

=== Bracket ===
Semifinals
1 | (Australia) Dylan Alcott (Australia) Heath Davidson | 6 | 7^{7}
(Netherlands) Sam Schröder (Netherlands) Niels Vink | 3 | 6^{4}
(Japan) Koji Sugeno (United States) Nicholas Taylor | 1 | 4
2 | (United Kingdom) Andy Lapthorne (United States) David Wagner | 6 | 6

Final
1 | (Australia) Dylan Alcott (Australia) Heath Davidson | 6 | 3 | [10]
2 | (United Kingdom) Andy Lapthorne (United States) David Wagner | 2 | 6 | [7]
