= 2021 Australian Open – Wheelchair quad singles =

Wheelchair quad singles
- 2021 Australian Open

Final
- Champion: (Australia) Dylan Alcott
- Runner-up: (Netherlands) Sam Schröder
- Score: 6–1, 6–0

Events
| Singles | men | women | | boys | girls |
| Doubles | men | women | mixed | boys | girls |
| WC Singles | men | women | quad |
| WC Doubles | men | women | quad |
| Legends | men | women | mixed |
- Australian Open

Six-time defending champion Dylan Alcott defeated Sam Schröder in the final, 6–1, 6–0 to win the quad singles wheelchair tennis title at the 2021 Australian Open. It was the first step towards an eventual Golden Slam for Alcott.

For the first time in major history, the draw was increased from four to eight players.

== Seeds ==
1. (Australia) Dylan Alcott (champion)
2. (United Kingdom) Andy Lapthorne (semifinals)

== Draw ==
Key

- Q = Qualifier
- WC = Wild card
- LL = Lucky loser
- Alt = Alternate
- ITF = ITF entry
- PR = Protected ranking
- SR = Special ranking
- SE = Special exempt
- JE = Junior exempt
- JR = Junior Accelerator Programme entrant
- CO = College Accelerator Programme entrant
- NG = Next Gen Accelerator Program entrant
- w/o = Walkover
- r = Retired
- d = Defaulted

=== Bracket ===
Quarterfinals
1 | (Australia) Dylan Alcott | 6 | 7
(Australia) Heath Davidson | 0 | 5
WC | (United States) Nicholas Taylor | 0 | 0
(Netherlands) Niels Vink | 6 | 6
(Japan) Koji Sugeno | 6 | 3 | 3
(Netherlands) Sam Schröder | 2 | 6 | 6
(United States) David Wagner | 1 | 4
2 | (United Kingdom) Andy Lapthorne | 6 | 6

Semifinals
1 | (Australia) Dylan Alcott | 6 | 6
(Netherlands) Niels Vink | 4 | 3
(Netherlands) Sam Schröder | 6 | 6
2 | (United Kingdom) Andy Lapthorne | 2 | 3

Final
1 | (Australia) Dylan Alcott | 6 | 6
(Netherlands) Sam Schröder | 1 | 0
