= 2021 Australian Open – Men's singles =

Tennis championship

Men's singles
- 2021 Australian Open

Final
- Champion: (Serbia) Novak Djokovic
- Runner-up: (Russia) Daniil Medvedev
- Score: 7–5, 6–2, 6–2

Details
- Draw: 128 (16Q / 8WC)
- Seeds: 32

Events
Singles	men	women		boys	girls
Doubles	men	women	mixed	boys	girls
WC Singles	men	women	quad
WC Doubles	men	women	quad
Legends	men	women	mixed
- Australian Open

Two-time defending champion Novak Djokovic defeated Daniil Medvedev in the final, 7–5, 6–2, 6–2 to win the men's singles tennis title at the 2021 Australian Open. It was his record-extending ninth Australian Open title and 18th major title overall. With his fourth-round win, Djokovic joined Roger Federer as only the second man to achieve 300 match wins in majors.

Aslan Karatsev was the first male qualifier to reach a major semifinal since Vladimir Voltchkov in the 2000 Wimbledon Championships, and the first at the Australian Open since Bob Giltinan in December 1977. Ranked world No. 114, he was the lowest-ranked player to reach a major semifinal since Goran Ivanišević (ranked No. 125) at the 2001 Wimbledon Championships, the lowest ranked to do so at the Australian Open since Patrick McEnroe (also ranked No. 114) in 1991, and the first man in the Open Era to reach the semifinals on his major main-draw debut.

Djokovic, Medvedev and Rafael Nadal were all in contention for the No. 1 ranking. Djokovic retained the No. 1 rank after Nadal lost his quarterfinal match and Djokovic reached the semifinals.

This was the first major in the Open Era to feature three Russian men in the quarterfinals, those being Medvedev, Karatsev, and Andrey Rublev.

This marked the first major main-draw appearance of future world No. 1 and seven-time major champion Carlos Alcaraz, who would win the title five years later; he lost to Mikael Ymer in the second round. At 17 years old, Alcaraz was the youngest man to win a main-draw match at the Australian Open since Bernard Tomic in 2009.

== Seeds ==
All seedings per ATP rankings.

1. (Serbia) Novak Djokovic (champion)
2. (Spain) Rafael Nadal (quarterfinals)
3. (Austria) Dominic Thiem (fourth round)
4. (Russia) Daniil Medvedev (final)
5. (Greece) Stefanos Tsitsipas (semifinals)
6. (Germany) Alexander Zverev (quarterfinals)
7. (Russia) Andrey Rublev (quarterfinals)
8. (Argentina) Diego Schwartzman (third round)
9. (Italy) Matteo Berrettini (fourth round, withdrew)
10. (France) Gaël Monfils (first round)
11. (Canada) Denis Shapovalov (third round)
12. (Spain) Roberto Bautista Agut (first round)
13. (Belgium) David Goffin (first round)
14. (Canada) Milos Raonic (fourth round)
15. (Spain) Pablo Carreño Busta (third round, retired)
16. (Italy) Fabio Fognini (fourth round)

17. (Switzerland) Stan Wawrinka (second round)
18. (Bulgaria) Grigor Dimitrov (quarterfinals)
19. (Russia) Karen Khachanov (third round)
20. (Canada) Félix Auger-Aliassime (fourth round)
21. (Australia) Alex de Minaur (third round)
22. (Croatia) Borna Ćorić (second round)
23. (Serbia) Dušan Lajović (fourth round)
24. (Norway) Casper Ruud (fourth round, retired)
25. (France) Benoît Paire (first round)
26. (Poland) Hubert Hurkacz (first round)
27. (United States) Taylor Fritz (third round)
28. (Serbia) Filip Krajinović (third round)
29. (France) Ugo Humbert (second round)
30. (United Kingdom) Dan Evans (first round)
31. (Italy) Lorenzo Sonego (second round)
32. (France) Adrian Mannarino (third round)

Click on the seed number of a player to go to their draw section.

== Draw ==
Key

- Q = Qualifier
- WC = Wild card
- LL = Lucky loser
- Alt = Alternate
- ITF = ITF entry
- PR = Protected ranking
- SR = Special ranking
- SE = Special exempt
- JE = Junior exempt
- JR = Junior Accelerator Programme entrant
- CO = College Accelerator Programme entrant
- NG = Next Gen Accelerator Program entrant
- w/o = Walkover
- r = Retired
- d = Defaulted

=== Finals ===
Quarterfinals
1	(Serbia) Novak Djokovic	6^{6}	6	6	7^{8}
6	(Germany) Alexander Zverev	7^{8}	2	4	6^{6}
18	(Bulgaria) Grigor Dimitrov	6	4	1	2
Q	(Russia) Aslan Karatsev	2	6	6	6
7	(Russia) Andrey Rublev	5	3	2
4	(Russia) Daniil Medvedev	7	6	6
5	(Greece) Stefanos Tsitsipas	3	2	7^{7}	6	7
2	(Spain) Rafael Nadal	6	6	6^{4}	4	5

Semifinals
1	(Serbia) Novak Djokovic	6	6	6
Q	(Russia) Aslan Karatsev	3	4	2
4	(Russia) Daniil Medvedev	6	6	7
5	(Greece) Stefanos Tsitsipas	4	2	5

Final
1	(Serbia) Novak Djokovic	7	6	6
4	(Russia) Daniil Medvedev	5	2	2

=== Top half ===
==== Section 1 ====
First round
1	(Serbia) N Djokovic	6	6	6
(France) J Chardy	3	1	2
(United States) F Tiafoe	7^{7}	6	6
(Italy) S Travaglia	6^{5}	2	2
(United States) R Opelka	6	7^{7}	6
PR	(Chinese Taipei) Y-h Lu	3	6^{2}	3
(Spain) A Ramos Viñolas	6^{6}	6	2	6^{6}
27	(United States) T Fritz	7^{8}	3	6	7^{8}
17	(Switzerland) S Wawrinka	6	6	6
(Portugal) P Sousa	3	2	4
(Hungary) M Fucsovics	4	6	6	6^{3}	6
WC	(Australia) M Polmans	6	3	1	7^{7}	3
(France) C Moutet	6	6^{4}	3	6	6
(Australia) J Millman	4	7^{7}	6	2	3
(Argentina) F Coria	3	3	2
14	(Canada) M Raonic	6	6	6

Second round
1	(Serbia) N Djokovic	6	6^{3}	7^{7}	6
(United States) F Tiafoe	3	7^{7}	6^{2}	3
(United States) R Opelka	6	6^{6}	7^{7}	6^{5}	2
27	(United States) T Fritz	4	7^{8}	6^{4}	7^{7}	6
17	(Switzerland) S Wawrinka	5	1	6	6	6^{9}
(Hungary) M Fucsovics	7	6	4	2	7^{11}
(France) C Moutet	7^{7}	1	1	4
14	(Canada) M Raonic	6^{1}	6	6	6

Third round
1	(Serbia) N Djokovic	7^{7}	6	3	4	6
27	(United States) T Fritz	6^{1}	4	6	6	2
(Hungary) M Fucsovics	6^{2}	7	2	2
14	(Canada) M Raonic	7^{7}	5	6	6

Fourth round
1	(Serbia) N Djokovic	7^{7}	4	6	6
14	(Canada) M Raonic	6^{4}	6	1	4

==== Section 2 ====
First round
10	(France) G Monfils	6	4	5	6	3
(Finland) E Ruusuvuori	3	6	7	3	6
(Japan) Y Nishioka	7^{7}	1	1	1
(Spain) P Martínez	6^{3}	6	6	6
(Slovenia) A Bedene	4	5	7	4
(Kazakhstan) A Bublik	6	7	5	6
Q	(Ukraine) S Stakhovsky	7	4	3	7	4
23	(Serbia) D Lajović	5	6	6	5	6
32	(France) A Mannarino	6	6	7^{7}
(Austria) D Novak	2	4	6^{2}
(Serbia) M Kecmanović	6	6	6
(Poland) K Majchrzak	2	4	3
LL	(Japan) T Daniel	6^{1}	6^{3}	4
Q	(United States) M Cressy	7^{7}	7^{7}	6
(United States) M Giron	7^{10}	6^{5}	3	2
6	(Germany) A Zverev	6^{8}	7^{7}	6	6

Second round
(Finland) E Ruusuvuori	6	3	2	6^{5}
(Spain) P Martínez	1	6	6	7^{7}
(Kazakhstan) A Bublik	4	6^{4}	6	3
23	(Serbia) D Lajović	6	7^{7}	4	6
32	(France) A Mannarino	6	6	6
(Serbia) M Kecmanović	1	2	4
Q	(United States) M Cressy	5	4	3
6	(Germany) A Zverev	7	6	6

Third round
(Spain) P Martínez	7^{8}	5	1	4
23	(Serbia) D Lajović	6^{6}	7	6	6
32	(France) A Mannarino	3	3	1
6	(Germany) A Zverev	6	6	6

Fourth round
23	(Serbia) D Lajović	4	6^{5}	3
6	(Germany) A Zverev	6	7^{7}	6

==== Section 3 ====
First round
3	(Austria) D Thiem	7^{7}	6	6
(Kazakhstan) M Kukushkin	6^{2}	2	3
(Germany) D Koepfer	7	6	6
LL	(Bolivia) H Dellien	5	2	4
Q	(Portugal) F Ferreira Silva	4	4	4
(Australia) N Kyrgios	6	6	6
(Japan) Y Uchiyama	3	4	7^{7}	3
29	(France) U Humbert	6	6	6^{3}	6
18	(Bulgaria) G Dimitrov	6	6	7^{7}
(Croatia) M Čilić	4	2	6^{5}
WC	(Australia) A Bolt	6	6	4	6
(Slovakia) N Gombos	2	2	6	3
Q	(Belgium) K Coppejans	4	6	7^{7}	3	3
(Czech Republic) J Veselý	6	3	6^{3}	6	6
(Japan) K Nishikori	5	6^{4}	2
15	(Spain) P Carreño Busta	7	7^{7}	6

Second round
3	(Austria) D Thiem	6	6	6
(Germany) D Koepfer	4	0	2
(Australia) N Kyrgios	5	6	3	7^{7}	6
29	(France) U Humbert	7	4	6	6^{2}	4
18	(Bulgaria) G Dimitrov	7^{7}	6	6
WC	(Australia) A Bolt	6^{1}	1	2
(Czech Republic) J Veselý	3	6^{3}	6	4
15	(Spain) P Carreño Busta	6	7^{7}	2	6

Third round
3	(Austria) D Thiem	4	4	6	6	6
(Australia) N Kyrgios	6	6	3	4	4
18	(Bulgaria) G Dimitrov	6	1
15	(Spain) P Carreño Busta	0	0^{r}

Fourth round
3	(Austria) D Thiem	4	4	0
18	(Bulgaria) G Dimitrov	6	6	6

==== Section 4 ====
First round
11	(Canada) D Shapovalov	3	6	6	4	6
(Italy) J Sinner	6	3	2	6	4
(Japan) Y Sugita	6	1	1^{r}
Q	(Australia) B Tomic	3	6	4
LL	(Bosnia and Herzegovina) D Džumhur	3	2	4
(Australia) J Duckworth	6	6	6
LL	(Germany) C-M Stebe	2	4	2
20	(Canada) F Auger-Aliassime	6	6	6
25	(France) B Paire	2	6	6^{5}	5
(Belarus) E Gerasimov	6	2	7^{7}	7
(Italy) G Mager	3	3	4
Q	(Russia) A Karatsev	6	6	6
LL	(France) A Müller	4	6	6	6
(Argentina) JI Londero	6	3	0	3
Q	(Sweden) E Ymer	6^{3}	4	6	2
8	(Argentina) D Schwartzman	7^{7}	6	2	6

Second round
11	(Canada) D Shapovalov	6	6	6
Q	(Australia) B Tomic	1	3	2
(Australia) J Duckworth	4	1	2
20	(Canada) F Auger-Aliassime	6	6	6
(Belarus) E Gerasimov	0	1	0
Q	(Russia) A Karatsev	6	6	6
LL	(France) A Müller	2	0	3
8	(Argentina) D Schwartzman	6	6	6

Third round
11	(Canada) D Shapovalov	5	5	3
20	(Canada) F Auger-Aliassime	7	7	6
Q	(Russia) A Karatsev	6	6	6
8	(Argentina) D Schwartzman	3	3	3

Fourth round
20	(Canada) F Auger-Aliassime	6	6	3	3	4
Q	(Russia) A Karatsev	3	1	6	6	6

=== Bottom half ===
==== Section 5 ====
First round
7	(Russia) A Rublev	6	6	6
(Germany) Y Hanfmann	3	3	4
(Brazil) T Monteiro	7^{8}	6	6
(Slovakia) A Martin	6^{6}	1	2
WC	(Australia) L Tu	7^{7}	4	6^{4}	4
(Spain) F López	6^{1}	6	7^{7}	6
(United States) S Querrey	5	4	4
31	(Italy) L Sonego	7	6	6
24	(Norway) C Ruud	6	6	2
(Australia) J Thompson	3	3	1^{r}
(Georgia (country)) N Basilashvili	4	6^{0}	4
(United States) T Paul	6	7^{7}	6
WC	(Australia) C O'Connell	7^{7}	7^{7}	6
(Germany) J-L Struff	6^{2}	6^{5}	1
(Moldova) R Albot	6^{1}	6	6	7^{7}
12	(Spain) R Bautista Agut	7^{7}	0	4	6^{5}

Second round
7	(Russia) A Rublev	6	6	7^{10}
(Brazil) T Monteiro	4	4	6^{8}
(Spain) F López	5	3	6	7	6
31	(Italy) L Sonego	7	6	3	5	4
24	(Norway) C Ruud	3	6	6	7
(United States) T Paul	6	2	4	5
WC	(Australia) C O'Connell	2	5	6^{8}
(Moldova) R Albot	6	7	7^{10}

Third round
7	(Russia) A Rublev	7	6	6
(Spain) F López	5	2	3
24	(Norway) C Ruud	6	5	6	6
(Moldova) R Albot	1	7	4	4

Fourth round
7	(Russia) A Rublev	6	7^{7}	0
24	(Norway) C Ruud	2	6^{3}	0^{r}

==== Section 6 ====
First round
13	(Belgium) D Goffin	6	4	7^{7}	6^{6}	3
WC	(Australia) A Popyrin	3	6	6^{4}	7^{8}	6
(South Africa) L Harris	4	6	6	6
LL	(Denmark) M Torpegaard	6	3	2	2
PR	(United States) M McDonald	3	6	6	6
(Italy) M Cecchinato	6	3	2	2
(Argentina) G Pella	3	6^{5}	5
22	(Croatia) B Ćorić	6	7^{7}	7
28	(Serbia) F Krajinović	7^{7}	6	4	6
LL	(Netherlands) R Haase	6^{4}	3	6	2
(Spain) P Andújar	6	7	7
Q	(France) Q Halys	4	5	5
(Spain) R Carballés Baena	7	3	6	6
(Hungary) A Balázs	5	6	2	3
(Canada) V Pospisil	2	2	4
4	(Russia) D Medvedev	6	6	6

Second round
WC	(Australia) A Popyrin	2	6	3	7^{7}	3
(South Africa) L Harris	6	1	6	6^{5}	6
PR	(United States) M McDonald	6	6	4	6
22	(Croatia) B Ćorić	4	2	6	4
28	(Serbia) F Krajinović	6	5	6	6
(Spain) P Andújar	2	7	1	4
(Spain) R Carballés Baena	2	5	1
4	(Russia) D Medvedev	6	7	6

Third round
(South Africa) L Harris	6^{7}	1	4
PR	(United States) M McDonald	7^{9}	6	6
28	(Serbia) F Krajinović	3	3	6	6	0
4	(Russia) D Medvedev	6	6	4	3	6

Fourth round
PR	(United States) M McDonald	4	2	3
4	(Russia) D Medvedev	6	6	6

==== Section 7 ====
First round
5	(Greece) S Tsitsipas	6	6	6
(France) G Simon	1	2	1
WC	(Australia) T Kokkinakis	6	6	6
(South Korea) S-w Kwon	4	1	1
Q	(Netherlands) B van de Zandschulp	1	4	4
Q	(Spain) C Alcaraz	6	6	6
(Sweden) M Ymer	3	6	3	7	6
26	(Poland) H Hurkacz	6	3	6	5	3
19	(Russia) K Khachanov	6	6^{4}	7^{7}	6
WC	(Australia) A Vukic	3	7^{7}	6^{2}	4
(Lithuania) R Berankis	6	7	6
WC	(India) S Nagal	2	5	3
Q	(Czech Republic) T Macháč	6^{5}	7	6	3
Q	(Spain) M Vilella Martínez	7^{7}	5	0	0^{r}
(South Africa) K Anderson	6^{9}	5	3
9	(Italy) M Berrettini	7^{11}	7	6

Second round
5	(Greece) S Tsitsipas	6^{5}	6	6	6^{5}	6
WC	(Australia) T Kokkinakis	7^{7}	4	1	7^{7}	4
Q	(Spain) C Alcaraz	6	4	4	6^{5}
(Sweden) M Ymer	2	6	6	7^{7}
19	(Russia) K Khachanov	6	6	6
(Lithuania) R Berankis	2	4	4
Q	(Czech Republic) T Macháč	3	2	6	3
9	(Italy) M Berrettini	6	6	4	6

Third round
5	(Greece) S Tsitsipas	6	6	6
(Sweden) M Ymer	4	1	1
19	(Russia) K Khachanov	6^{1}	6^{5}	6^{5}
9	(Italy) M Berrettini	7^{7}	7^{7}	7^{7}

Fourth round
5	(Greece) S Tsitsipas	w/o
9	(Italy) M Berrettini

==== Section 8 ====
First round
16	(Italy) F Fognini	6	6	6
(France) P-H Herbert	4	2	3
Q	(Switzerland) H Laaksonen	2	4	3
(Italy) S Caruso	6	6	6
(Uruguay) P Cuevas	6	4	6	6
(Italy) A Seppi	4	6	2	2
(United States) T Sandgren	5	1	1
21	(Australia) A de Minaur	7	6	6
30	(United Kingdom) D Evans	4	6	4	5
(United Kingdom) C Norrie	6	4	6	7
(Belarus) I Ivashka	4	3	4
Q	(Russia) R Safiullin	6	6	6
Q	(United States) M Mmoh	7^{7}	6^{3}	3	7^{7}	7
Q	(Serbia) V Troicki	6^{3}	7^{7}	6	6^{3}	5
(Serbia) L Đere	3	4	1
2	(Spain) R Nadal	6	6	6

Second round
16	(Italy) F Fognini	4	6	2	6	7^{14}
(Italy) S Caruso	6	2	6	3	6^{12}
(Uruguay) P Cuevas	3	3	5
21	(Australia) A de Minaur	6	6	7
(United Kingdom) C Norrie	3	7	6	7^{7}
Q	(Russia) R Safiullin	6	5	3	6^{3}
Q	(United States) M Mmoh	1	4	2
2	(Spain) R Nadal	6	6	6

Third round
16	(Italy) F Fognini	6	6	6
21	(Australia) A de Minaur	4	3	4
(United Kingdom) C Norrie	5	2	5
2	(Spain) R Nadal	7	6	7

Fourth round
16	(Italy) F Fognini	3	4	2
2	(Spain) R Nadal	6	6	6

== Seeded players ==
The following are the seeded players. Seedings are based on ATP rankings as of 1 February 2021. Rankings and points before are as of 8 February 2021.

Seed	Rank	Player	Points before	Points defending	Points won	Points after	Status
1	1	(Serbia) Novak Djokovic	12,030	2,000	2,000	12,030	Champion, defeated (Russia) Daniil Medvedev [4]
2	2	(Spain) Rafael Nadal	9,850	360	360	9,850	Quarterfinals lost to (Greece) Stefanos Tsitsipas [7]
3	3	(Austria) Dominic Thiem	9,125	1,200	180	9,125	Fourth round lost to (Bulgaria) Grigor Dimitrov [18]
4	4	(Russia) Daniil Medvedev	8,695	180	1,200	9,735	Final lost to (Serbia) Novak Djokovic [1]
5	6	(Greece) Stefanos Tsitsipas	5,940	90	720	6,595	Semifinals lost to (Russia) Daniil Medvedev [4]
6	7	(Germany) Alexander Zverev	5,615	720	360	5,615	Quarterfinals lost to (Serbia) Novak Djokovic [1]
7	8	(Russia) Andrey Rublev	4,429	180	360	4,609	Quarterfinals lost to (Russia) Daniil Medvedev [4]
8	9	(Argentina) Diego Schwartzman	3,480	180	90	3,480	Third round lost to (Russia) Aslan Karatsev [Q]
9	10	(Italy) Matteo Berrettini	3,345	45	180	3,480	Fourth round withdrew due to abdominal strain
10	12	(France) Gaël Monfils	2,860	180	10	2,860	First round lost to (Finland) Emil Ruusuvuori
11	11	(Canada) Denis Shapovalov	2,830	10	90	2,910	Third round lost to (Canada) Félix Auger-Aliassime [20]
12	13	(Spain) Roberto Bautista Agut	2,710	90	10	2,710	First round lost to (Moldova) Radu Albot
13	15	(Belgium) David Goffin	2,600	90	10	2,600	First round lost to (Australia) Alexei Popyrin [WC]
14	14	(Canada) Milos Raonic	2,630	360	180	2,630	Fourth round lost to (Serbia) Novak Djokovic [1]
15	16	(Spain) Pablo Carreño Busta	2,585	90	90	2,585	Third round retired against (Bulgaria) Grigor Dimitrov [18]
16	17	(Italy) Fabio Fognini	2,535	180	180	2,535	Fourth round lost to (Spain) Rafael Nadal [2]
17	18	(Switzerland) Stan Wawrinka	2,365	360	45	2,365	Second round lost to (Hungary) Márton Fucsovics
18	21	(Bulgaria) Grigor Dimitrov	2,260	45	360	2,575	Quarterfinals lost to (Russia) Aslan Karatsev [Q]
19	20	(Russia) Karen Khachanov	2,290	90	90	2,290	Third round lost to (Italy) Matteo Berrettini [9]
20	19	(Canada) Félix Auger-Aliassime	2,346	10	180	2,516	Fourth round lost to (Russia) Aslan Karatsev [Q]
21	23	(Australia) Alex de Minaur	2,065	0	90	2,155	Third round lost to (Italy) Fabio Fognini [16]
22	25	(Croatia) Borna Ćorić	1,855	10	45	1,890	Second round lost to (United States) Mackenzie McDonald [PR]
23	27	(Serbia) Dušan Lajović	1,785	90	180	1,875	Fourth round lost to (Germany) Alexander Zverev [6]
24	28	(Norway) Casper Ruud	1,739	10	180	1,909	Fourth round lost to (Russia) Andrey Rublev [7]
25	29	(France) Benoît Paire	1,738	45	10	1,738	First round lost to (Belarus) Egor Gerasimov
26	30	(Poland) Hubert Hurkacz	1,735	45	10	1,735	First round lost to (Sweden) Mikael Ymer
27	31	(United States) Taylor Fritz	1,695	90	90	1,695	Third round lost to (Serbia) Novak Djokovic [1]
28	33	(Serbia) Filip Krajinović	1,673	45	90	1,718	Third round lost to (Russia) Daniil Medvedev [4]
29	34	(France) Ugo Humbert	1,671	10	45	1,706	Second round lost to (Australia) Nick Kyrgios
30	26	(United Kingdom) Dan Evans	1,794	45	10	1,794	First round lost to (United Kingdom) Cameron Norrie
31	35	(Italy) Lorenzo Sonego	1,588	10	45	1,623	Second round lost to (Spain) Feliciano López
32	36	(France) Adrian Mannarino	1,561	10	90	1,641	Third round lost to (Germany) Alexander Zverev [6]

== Other entry information ==
=== Wild cards ===
- (Australia) Alex Bolt
- (Australia) Thanasi Kokkinakis
- (India) Sumit Nagal
- (Australia) Christopher O'Connell
- (Australia) Marc Polmans
- (Australia) Alexei Popyrin
- (Australia) Li Tu
- (Australia) Aleksandar Vukic

=== Protected ranking ===
- (Chinese Taipei) Lu Yen-hsun (71)
- (United States) Mackenzie McDonald (83)

=== Qualifiers ===
- (Spain) Carlos Alcaraz
- (Belgium) Kimmer Coppejans
- (United States) Maxime Cressy
- (Portugal) Frederico Ferreira Silva
- (France) Quentin Halys
- (Russia) Aslan Karatsev
- (Switzerland) Henri Laaksonen
- (Czech Republic) Tomáš Macháč
- (United States) Michael Mmoh
- (Russia) Roman Safiullin
- (Ukraine) Sergiy Stakhovsky
- (Australia) Bernard Tomic
- (Serbia) Viktor Troicki
- (Netherlands) Botic van de Zandschulp
- (Spain) Mario Vilella Martínez
- (Sweden) Elias Ymer

=== Lucky losers ===
- (Japan) Taro Daniel
- (Bolivia) Hugo Dellien
- (Bosnia and Herzegovina) Damir Džumhur
- (Netherlands) Robin Haase
- (France) Alexandre Müller
- (Germany) Cedrik-Marcel Stebe
- (Denmark) Mikael Torpegaard

=== Potential lucky losers ===
1. (Croatia) Borna Gojo (did not play)

=== Withdrawals ===
- † (Spain) Fernando Verdasco (65) → replaced by (Australia) James Duckworth (103)
- † (Germany) Philipp Kohlschreiber (98) → replaced by (Japan) Yasutaka Uchiyama (104)
- ‡ (Switzerland) Roger Federer (5) → replaced by (Portugal) Pedro Sousa (105)
- ‡ (France) Jo-Wilfried Tsonga (62) → replaced by (Italy) Andreas Seppi (106)
- ‡ (France) Lucas Pouille (70) → replaced by (Poland) Kamil Majchrzak (107)
- ‡ (United Kingdom) Kyle Edmund (48) → replaced by (Belarus) Ilya Ivashka (108) (Note: Last direct acceptance)
- ∆ (United States) John Isner (25) → replaced by (Bolivia) Hugo Dellien (LL)
- ∆ (Chile) Cristian Garín (22) → replaced by (Japan) Taro Daniel (LL)
- Ω (Spain) Alejandro Davidovich Fokina (52) → replaced by (Bosnia and Herzegovina) Damir Džumhur (LL)
- Ω (Portugal) João Sousa (90) → replaced by (Germany) Cedrik-Marcel Stebe (LL)
- Ω (United States) Steve Johnson (72) → replaced by (Denmark) Mikael Torpegaard (LL)
- Ω (France) Richard Gasquet (47) → replaced by (Netherlands) Robin Haase (LL)
- § (Argentina) Federico Delbonis (82) → replaced by (France) Alexandre Müller (LL)

† – not included on entry list
‡ – withdrew from entry list before qualifying began
∆ – withdrew from entry list during qualifying
Ω – withdrew from entry list during a mandatory 14-day quarantine period
§ – withdrew from main draw

== See also ==
- 2021 Australian Open – Day-by-day summaries

== Explanatory notes ==
Preceded by 2020 French Open – Men's singles	Grand Slam men's singles	Succeeded by 2021 French Open – Men's singles
