= 2022 Queen's Club Championships =

- Date: 13–19 June
- Edition: 119th
- Category: ATP Tour 500 series
- Draw: 32S / 16D
- Prize money: €2,134,520
- Surface: Grass
- Location: London, United Kingdom
- Venue: Queen's Club

Champions

Singles
- (Italy) Matteo Berrettini

Doubles
- (Croatia) Nikola Mektić / (Croatia) Mate Pavić
- Queen's Club Championships

The 2022 Queen's Club Championships (also known as the cinch Championships for sponsorship reasons) was a men's professional tennis tournament played on outdoor grass courts at the Queen's Club in London, United Kingdom from 13 to 19 June 2022. It was the 119th edition of the event and was classified as an ATP Tour 500 tournament on the 2022 ATP Tour.

== Finals ==
=== Singles ===
- (Italy) Matteo Berrettini defeated (Serbia) Filip Krajinović, 7–5, 6–4

=== Doubles ===
- (Croatia) Nikola Mektić / (Croatia) Mate Pavić defeated (United Kingdom) Lloyd Glasspool / (Finland) Harri Heliövaara, 3–6, 7–6^{(7–3)}, [10–6]

== Points and prize money ==
=== Points distribution ===
Event	W	F	SF	QF	Round of 16	Round of 32	Round of 64	Q	Q2	Q1
Singles	500	300	180	90	45	20	0	10	4	0
Doubles	500	300	180	90	0	—N/a	—N/a	45	25	0

=== Prize money ===
Event	W	F	SF	QF	Round of 16	Round of 32	Q2	Q1
Singles	€113,785	€84,075	€59,860	€40,765	€25,480	€14,650	€6,750	€3,565
Doubles*	€40,200	€30,240	€21,760	€14,340	€9,020	€5,000	—N/a	—N/a

_{*per team}

== ATP singles main-draw entrants ==
=== Seeds ===
Country	Player	Rank^{1}	Seed
NOR	Casper Ruud	6	1
ITA	Matteo Berrettini	10	2
GBR	Cameron Norrie	11	3
USA	Taylor Fritz	14	4
ARG	Diego Schwartzman	15	5
CAN	Denis Shapovalov	16	6
CRO	Marin Čilić	17	7
USA	Reilly Opelka	18	8

- ^{1} Rankings are as of June 6, 2022.

=== Other entrants ===
The following players received wildcards into the main draw:

- (United Kingdom) Liam Broady
- (United Kingdom) Jack Draper
- (United Kingdom) Ryan Peniston

The following player received entry as a special exempt:

- ~~(United Kingdom) Andy Murray~~

The following player received entry using a protected ranking:

- (Switzerland) Stan Wawrinka

The following players received entry from the qualifying draw:

- (France) Quentin Halys
- (United Kingdom) Paul Jubb
- (United States) Sam Querrey
- (Finland) Emil Ruusuvuori

The following player received entry as a lucky loser:

- (United States) Denis Kudla

=== Withdrawals ===
Before the tournament

- (Spain) Carlos Alcaraz → replaced by (Serbia) Filip Krajinović
- (France) Gaël Monfils → replaced by (Argentina) Francisco Cerúndolo
- (United Kingdom) Andy Murray → replaced by (United States) Denis Kudla

== ATP doubles main-draw entrants ==
=== Seeds ===
Country	Player	Country	Player	Rank^{1}	Seed
USA	Rajeev Ram	GBR	Joe Salisbury	3	1
CRO	Nikola Mektić	CRO	Mate Pavić	8	2
NED	Wesley Koolhof	GBR	Neal Skupski	19	3
COL	Juan Sebastián Cabal	COL	Robert Farah	22	4

- ^{1} Rankings are as of June 6, 2022.

=== Other entrants ===
The following pairs received wildcards into the doubles main draw:

- (United Kingdom) Lloyd Glasspool / (Finland) Harri Heliövaara
- (United Kingdom) Jonny O'Mara / (United Kingdom) Ken Skupski

The following pair received entry from the qualifying draw:

- (Sweden) André Göransson / (Japan) Ben McLachlan
