= 2023 Queen's Club Championships =

- Date: 19–25 June
- Edition: 120th
- Category: ATP Tour 500 series
- Draw: 32S / 16D
- Prize money: €2,195,175
- Surface: Grass
- Location: London, United Kingdom
- Venue: Queen's Club

Champions

Singles
- (Spain) Carlos Alcaraz

Doubles
- (Croatia) Ivan Dodig / (United States) Austin Krajicek
- Queen's Club Championships

The 2023 Queen's Club Championships (also known as the Cinch Championships for sponsorship reasons) was a men's professional tennis tournament played on outdoor grass courts at the Queen's Club in London, United Kingdom from 19 to 25 June 2023. It was the 120th edition of the event and was classified as an ATP Tour 500 tournament on the 2023 ATP Tour.

== Finals ==
=== Singles ===
- (Spain) Carlos Alcaraz def. (Australia) Alex de Minaur, 6–4, 6–4

=== Doubles ===
- (Croatia) Ivan Dodig / (United States) Austin Krajicek def. (United States) Taylor Fritz / (Czech Republic) Jiří Lehečka, 6–4, 6–7^{(5–7)}, [10–3]

== Points and prize money ==
=== Points distribution ===
Event	W	F	SF	QF	Round of 16	Round of 32	Round of 64	Q	Q2	Q1
Singles	500	300	180	90	45	20	0	10	4	0
Doubles	500	300	180	90	0	—N/a	—N/a	45	25	0

=== Prize money ===
Event	W	F	SF	QF	Round of 16	Round of 32	Q2	Q1
Singles	€410,515	€220,880	€117,715	€60,145	€32,105	€17,120	€8,775	€4,925
Doubles*	€134,840	€71,910	€36,380	€18,190	€9,420	€	—N/a	—N/a

_{*per team}

== ATP singles main-draw entrants ==
=== Seeds ===
Country	Player	Rank^{1}	Seed
ESP	Carlos Alcaraz	2	1
DEN	Holger Rune	6	2
USA	Taylor Fritz	8	3
USA	Frances Tiafoe	12	4
GBR	Cameron Norrie	13	5
ITA	Lorenzo Musetti	17	6
AUS	Alex de Minaur	18	7
ARG	Francisco Cerúndolo	20	8

- ^{1} Rankings are as of 12 June 2023.

=== Other entrants ===
The following players received wildcards into the main draw:

- (United Kingdom) Liam Broady
- (United Kingdom) Jan Choinski
- (United Kingdom) Ryan Peniston

The following player received entry using a protected ranking:

- ~~(Canada) Milos Raonic~~

The following player received entry as a special exempt:

- (Australia) Jordan Thompson

The following players received entry from the qualifying draw:

- (Bulgaria) Grigor Dimitrov
- ~~(France) Arthur Fils~~
- (United States) Mackenzie McDonald
- (United States) Tommy Paul

The following players received entry as lucky losers:

- (Australia) Alexei Popyrin
- (France) Arthur Rinderknech
- (United States) J. J. Wolf

=== Withdrawals ===
- (Italy) Matteo Berrettini → replaced by (United States) J. J. Wolf
- (Croatia) Marin Čilić → replaced by (Finland) Emil Ruusuvuori
- (France) Arthur Fils → replaced by (France) Arthur Rinderknech
- (Japan) Yoshihito Nishioka → replaced by (United States) Maxime Cressy
- (Canada) Milos Raonic → replaced by (Australia) Alexei Popyrin

== ATP doubles main-draw entrants ==
=== Seeds ===
Country	Player	Country	Player	Rank^{1}	Seed
NED	Wesley Koolhof	GBR	Neal Skupski	4	1
CRO	Ivan Dodig	USA	Austin Krajicek	5	2
USA	Rajeev Ram	GBR	Joe Salisbury	11	3
MON	Hugo Nys	POL	Jan Zieliński	21	4

- ^{1} Rankings are as of 12 June 2023.

=== Other entrants ===
The following pairs received wildcards into the doubles main draw:

- (United Kingdom) Liam Broady / (United Kingdom) Jonny O'Mara
- (United Kingdom) Julian Cash / (United Kingdom) Luke Johnson

The following pair received entry from the qualifying draw:

- (India) Yuki Bhambri / (India) Saketh Myneni

The following pair received entry as lucky losers:

- (Sweden) André Göransson / (Japan) Ben McLachlan

=== Withdrawals ===
- (United Kingdom) Andy Murray / (United Kingdom) Cameron Norrie → replaced by (Sweden) André Göransson / (Japan) Ben McLachlan
