= 2023 Queen's Club Championships – Doubles =

Doubles
- 2023 Queen's Club Championships

Final
- Champions: (Croatia) Ivan Dodig (United States) Austin Krajicek
- Runners-up: (United States) Taylor Fritz (Czech Republic) Jiří Lehečka
- Score: 6–4, 6–7^{(5–7)}, [10–3]

Details
- Draw: 16

Events
Singles	Doubles
← 2022 ·	Queen's Club Championships	· 2024 →

Ivan Dodig and Austin Krajicek defeated Taylor Fritz and Jiří Lehečka in the final, 6–4, 6–7^{(5–7)}, [10–3] to win the doubles tennis title at the 2023 Queen's Club Championships. By winning the title, Krajicek reclaimed the ATP no. 1 doubles ranking from Wesley Koolhof and Neal Skupski.

Nikola Mektić and Mate Pavić were the defending champions, but lost in the first round to Koolhof and Skupski.

== Seeds ==
1. (Netherlands) Wesley Koolhof / (United Kingdom) Neal Skupski (semifinals)
2. (Croatia) Ivan Dodig / (United States) Austin Krajicek (champions)
3. (United States) Rajeev Ram / (United Kingdom) Joe Salisbury (quarterfinals)
4. (Monaco) Hugo Nys / (Poland) Jan Zieliński (first round)

== Draw ==
=== Key ===
- Q = Qualifier
- WC = Wild card
- LL = Lucky loser
- Alt = Alternate
- SE = Special exempt
- PR = Protected ranking
- ITF = ITF entry
- JE = Junior exempt
- w/o = Walkover
- r = Retired
- d = Defaulted
- SR = Special ranking

=== Draw ===
First round
1	(Netherlands) W Koolhof (United Kingdom) N Skupski	6^{3}	7^{7}	[10]
(Croatia) N Mektić (Croatia) M Pavić	7^{7}	6^{3}	[7]
(India) R Bopanna (Australia) M Ebden	7^{10}	7^{7}
(United Kingdom) J Murray (New Zealand) M Venus	6^{8}	6^{5}
4	(Monaco) H Nys (Poland) J Zieliński	6	3	[7]
(United States) T Fritz (Czech Republic) J Lehečka	3	6	[10]
WC	(United Kingdom) J Cash (United Kingdom) L Johnson	7^{7}	6^{2}	[12]
(France) N Mahut (France) F Martin	6^{3}	7^{7}	[14]
(Netherlands) M Middelkoop (Netherlands) B van de Zandschulp	4	3
(Mexico) S González (France) É Roger-Vasselin	6	6
LL	(Sweden) A Göransson (Japan) B McLachlan	6^{4}	6^{4}
3	(United States) R Ram (United Kingdom) J Salisbury	7^{7}	7^{7}
(United Kingdom) D Evans (United Kingdom) L Glasspool	7^{7}	6
WC	(United Kingdom) L Broady (United Kingdom) J O'Mara	6^{5}	4
Q	(India) Y Bhambri (India) S Myneni	6	6^{2}	[6]
2	(Croatia) I Dodig (United States) A Krajicek	3	7^{7}	[10]

Quarterfinals
1	(Netherlands) W Koolhof (United Kingdom) N Skupski	6	7^{7}
(India) R Bopanna (Australia) M Ebden	3	6^{5}
(United States) T Fritz (Czech Republic) J Lehečka	6	6^{5}	[10]
(France) N Mahut (France) F Martin	3	7^{7}	[6]
(Mexico) S González (France) É Roger-Vasselin	7	6^{2}	[11]
3	(United States) R Ram (United Kingdom) J Salisbury	5	7^{7}	[9]
(United Kingdom) D Evans (United Kingdom) L Glasspool	4	4
2	(Croatia) I Dodig (United States) A Krajicek	6	6

Semifinals
1	(Netherlands) W Koolhof (United Kingdom) N Skupski	3	6^{4}
(United States) T Fritz (Czech Republic) J Lehečka	6	7^{7}
(Mexico) S González (France) É Roger-Vasselin	6^{4}	6^{5}
2	(Croatia) I Dodig (United States) A Krajicek	7^{7}	7^{7}

Final
(United States) T Fritz (Czech Republic) J Lehečka	4	7^{7}	[3]
2	(Croatia) I Dodig (United States) A Krajicek	6	6^{5}	[10]

== Qualifying ==
=== Seeds ===
1. (Sweden) André Göransson / (Japan) Ben McLachlan (qualifying competition, lucky losers)
2. (India) Yuki Bhambri / (India) Saketh Myneni (qualified)

=== Qualifiers ===
1. (India) Yuki Bhambri / (India) Saketh Myneni

=== Lucky losers ===
1. (Sweden) André Göransson / (Japan) Ben McLachlan

=== Qualifying draw ===
First round
1	(Sweden) André Göransson (Japan) Ben McLachlan	6	6
(United States) Sebastian Korda (United States) Ben Shelton	1	4
WC	(United Kingdom) Jan Choinski (United Kingdom) Ryan Peniston	6	6^{6}	[8]
2	(India) Yuki Bhambri (India) Saketh Myneni	4	7^{8}	[10]

Qualifying competition
1	(Sweden) André Göransson (Japan) Ben McLachlan	6	6^{4}	[11]
2	(India) Yuki Bhambri (India) Saketh Myneni	4	7^{7}	[13]
