= 2022 Queen's Club Championships – Singles =

Singles
- 2022 Queen's Club Championships

Final
- Champion: (Italy) Matteo Berrettini
- Runner-up: (Serbia) Filip Krajinović
- Score: 7–5, 6–4

Details
- Draw: 32 (4Q / 3WC)
- Seeds: 8

Events
Singles	Doubles
- Queen's Club Championships

Defending champion Matteo Berrettini defeated Filip Krajinović in the final, 7–5, 6–4 to win the singles tennis title at the 2022 Queen's Club Championships. By winning his fourth title on grass and seventh career ATP Tour singles title overall, Berrettini became the first player in the Open Era to claim the title in their first two appearances at the tournament. Krajinović had never earned a tour-level win on grass before the tournament and was seeking his first career title in his fifth final.

== Seeds ==
1. (Norway) Casper Ruud (first round)
2. (Italy) Matteo Berrettini (champion)
3. (United Kingdom) Cameron Norrie (first round)
4. (United States) Taylor Fritz (first round)

5. (Argentina) Diego Schwartzman (first round)
6. (Canada) Denis Shapovalov (first round)
7. (Croatia) Marin Čilić (semifinals)
8. (United States) Reilly Opelka (first round)

Click on the seed number of a player to go to their draw section.

== Draw ==
Key

- Q = Qualifier
- WC = Wild card
- LL = Lucky loser
- Alt = Alternate
- ITF = ITF entry
- PR = Protected ranking
- SR = Special ranking
- SE = Special exempt
- JE = Junior exempt
- JR = Junior Accelerator Programme entrant
- CO = College Accelerator Programme entrant
- NG = Next Gen Accelerator Program entrant
- w/o = Walkover
- r = Retired
- d = Defaulted

=== Finals ===
Semifinals
(Serbia) Filip Krajinović	6	6
7	(Croatia) Marin Čilić	3	3
(Netherlands) Botic van de Zandschulp	4	3
2	(Italy) Matteo Berrettini	6	6

Final
(Serbia) Filip Krajinović	5	4
2	(Italy) Matteo Berrettini	7	6

=== Top half ===
First round
1	(Norway) C Ruud	6^{4}	6^{2}
WC	(United Kingdom) R Peniston	7^{7}	7^{7}
(Argentina) F Cerúndolo	6	6
(Spain) P Martínez	3	2
(United States) J Brooksby	4	3
(Serbia) F Krajinović	6	6
Q	(United States) S Querrey	6	6
5	(Argentina) D Schwartzman	1	4
4	(United States) T Fritz	3	2
WC	(United Kingdom) J Draper	6	6
Q	(France) Q Halys	4	7^{8}	4
Q	(Finland) E Ruusuvuori	6	6^{6}	6
(Italy) L Musetti	3	0^{r}
(Kazakhstan) A Bublik	6	0
WC	(United Kingdom) L Broady	1	6	5
7	(Croatia) M Čilić	6	4	7

Second round
WC	(United Kingdom) R Peniston	6	4	6
(Argentina) F Cerúndolo	0	6	4
(Serbia) F Krajinović	4	6	6
Q	(United States) S Querrey	6	3	4
WC	(United Kingdom) J Draper	2	6^{2}
Q	(Finland) E Ruusuvuori	6	7^{7}
(Kazakhstan) A Bublik	6^{6}	5
7	(Croatia) M Čilić	7^{8}	7

Quarterfinals
WC	(United Kingdom) R Peniston	6	3	3
(Serbia) F Krajinović	4	6	6
Q	(Finland) E Ruusuvuori	6^{2}	4
7	(Croatia) M Čilić	7^{7}	6

Semifinals
(Serbia) F Krajinović	6	6
7	(Croatia) M Čilić	3	3

=== Bottom half ===
First round
8	(United States) R Opelka	4	4
(Australia) A de Minaur	6	6
(Spain) A Ramos Viñolas	5	4
(Spain) A Davidovich Fokina	7	6
Q	(United Kingdom) P Jubb	6^{5}	6	1
(Netherlands) B van de Zandschulp	7^{7}	4	6
(Bulgaria) G Dimitrov	6^{2}	6	6
3	(United Kingdom) C Norrie	7^{7}	1	4
6	(Canada) D Shapovalov	4	6	4
(United States) T Paul	6	2	6
(United States) F Tiafoe	6^{2}	7^{8}	6^{5}
PR	(Switzerland) S Wawrinka	7^{7}	6^{6}	7^{7}
LL	(United States) D Kudla	6	3	6
(Italy) L Sonego	4	6	4
(United Kingdom) D Evans	3	3
2	(Italy) M Berrettini	6	6

Second round
(Australia) A de Minaur	6	4	5
(Spain) A Davidovich Fokina	4	6	7
(Netherlands) B van de Zandschulp	7^{7}	6
(Bulgaria) G Dimitrov	6^{5}	3
(United States) T Paul	6	6
PR	(Switzerland) S Wawrinka	1	4
LL	(United States) D Kudla	6	6^{5}	4
2	(Italy) M Berrettini	3	7^{7}	6

Quarterfinals
(Spain) A Davidovich Fokina	2	4
(Netherlands) B van de Zandschulp	6	6
(United States) T Paul	4	2
2	(Italy) M Berrettini	6	6

Semifinals
(Netherlands) B van de Zandschulp	4	3
2	(Italy) M Berrettini	6	6

== Qualifying ==
=== Seeds ===
1. (Finland) Emil Ruusuvuori (qualified)
2. (United States) Brandon Nakashima (withdrew)
3. (Australia) James Duckworth (first round)
4. (United States) Denis Kudla (qualifying competition, lucky loser)

5. (Poland) Kamil Majchrzak (first round)
6. (Chile) Alejandro Tabilo (first round)
7. (Australia) Thanasi Kokkinakis (withdrew)
8. (United States) Steve Johnson (qualifying competition)

Click on the seed number of a player to go to their draw section.

=== Qualifiers ===
1. (Finland) Emil Ruusuvuori
2. (United States) Sam Querrey
3. (United Kingdom) Paul Jubb
4. (France) Quentin Halys

=== Lucky loser ===
1. (United States) Denis Kudla

=== Draw ===
==== First qualifier ====
First round
1	(Finland) Emil Ruusuvuori	6	6
WC	(United Kingdom) Jay Clarke	4	2
(Spain) Feliciano López	7	6
Alt	(United States) Bradley Klahn	5	4

Qualifying competition
1	(Finland) Emil Ruusuvuori	6	6^{3}	7^{10}
(Spain) Feliciano López	3	7^{7}	6^{8}

==== Second qualifier ====
First round
Alt	(Italy) Thomas Fabbiano	7^{7}	2	7^{7}
WC	(United Kingdom) Alastair Gray	6^{1}	6	6^{5}
(United States) Sam Querrey	7^{7}	6
5	(Poland) Kamil Majchrzak	6^{3}	2

Qualifying competition
Alt	(Italy) Thomas Fabbiano	2	2
(United States) Sam Querrey	6	6

==== Third qualifier ====
First round
3	(Australia) James Duckworth	6^{0}	6	1
WC	(United Kingdom) Paul Jubb	7^{7}	4	6
(United States) Stefan Kozlov	0	0
8	(United States) Steve Johnson	6	6

Qualifying competition
WC	(United Kingdom) Paul Jubb	7^{7}	7
8	(United States) Steve Johnson	6^{4}	5

==== Fourth qualifier ====
First round
4	(United States) Denis Kudla	6	1	6
(Japan) Taro Daniel	4	6	0
(France) Quentin Halys	6	6
6	(Chile) Alejandro Tabilo	2	3

Qualifying competition
4	(United States) Denis Kudla	6^{2}	4
(France) Quentin Halys	7^{7}	6
