= 2021 ITF Men's World Tennis Tour (April–June) =

Organised by the International Tennis Federation for Men's Professional Team

The 2021 ITF Men's World Tennis Tour is the 2021 edition of the second-tier tour for men's professional tennis. It is organised by the International Tennis Federation and is a tier below the ATP Challenger Tour. The ITF Men's World Tennis Tour includes tournaments with prize money ranging from $15,000 to $25,000.

== Key ==
M25 tournaments
M15 tournaments

== Month ==
=== April ===
Week of	Tournament	Winner	Runners-up	Semifinalists	Quarterfinalists
April 5	Córdoba, Argentina; Clay; M15; Singles and Doubles Draws	(Chile) Gonzalo Lama; 6–3, 6–2	(Argentina) Facundo Juárez	(Argentina) Tomás Farjat (Brazil) Matheus Pucinelli de Almeida	(Argentina) Lucio Carnevalle (Italy) Luciano Darderi (Argentina) Santiago Rodríguez Taverna (Argentina) Mariano Kestelboim
April 5	Córdoba, Argentina; Clay; M15; Singles and Doubles Draws	(Argentina) Gabriel Alejandro Hidalgo (Argentina) Santiago Rodríguez Taverna; 6–2, 1–6, [10–4]	(Argentina) Santiago de la Fuente (Argentina) Juan Bautista Torres	(Argentina) Tomás Farjat (Brazil) Matheus Pucinelli de Almeida	(Argentina) Lucio Carnevalle (Italy) Luciano Darderi (Argentina) Santiago Rodríguez Taverna (Argentina) Mariano Kestelboim
April 5	Sharm El Sheikh, Egypt; Hard; M15; Singles and Doubles Draws	(United Kingdom) Paul Jubb; 6–2, 6–7^{(8–10)}, 6–4	(India) Sasikumar Mukund	(Czech Republic) David Poljak (United States) Nicolas Moreno de Alboran	(Bosnia and Herzegovina) Aldin Šetkić (United Kingdom) Luke Johnson (Italy) Alessandro Bega (Japan) Yuta Shimizu
April 5	Sharm El Sheikh, Egypt; Hard; M15; Singles and Doubles Draws	(Netherlands) Ryan Nijboer (Austria) Neil Oberleitner; 4–6, 7–6^{(7–4)}, [10–6]	(Japan) Makoto Ochi (Japan) Yuta Shimizu	(Czech Republic) David Poljak (United States) Nicolas Moreno de Alboran	(Bosnia and Herzegovina) Aldin Šetkić (United Kingdom) Luke Johnson (Italy) Alessandro Bega (Japan) Yuta Shimizu
April 5	Shymkent, Kazakhstan; Clay; M15; Singles and Doubles Draws	(Russia) Ivan Gakhov; 6–3, 5–7, 7–5	(Ukraine) Eric Vanshelboim	(Ukraine) Aleksandr Braynin (Italy) Antonio Campo	(Kazakhstan) Dostanbek Tashbulatov (Italy) Federico Bertuccioli (Uzbekistan) Sergey Fomin (Switzerland) Damien Wenger
April 5	Shymkent, Kazakhstan; Clay; M15; Singles and Doubles Draws	(Belarus) Aleksei Khomich (Belarus) Yaraslav Shyla; 7–5, 3–6, [10–6]	(Belarus) Ivan Liutarevich (Ukraine) Vladyslav Manafov	(Ukraine) Aleksandr Braynin (Italy) Antonio Campo	(Kazakhstan) Dostanbek Tashbulatov (Italy) Federico Bertuccioli (Uzbekistan) Sergey Fomin (Switzerland) Damien Wenger
April 5	Saint Petersburg, Russia; Hard (indoor); M15; Singles and Doubles Draws	(Russia) Ivan Nedelko; 2–6, 7–5, 6–4	(Ukraine) Illya Beloborodko	(Moldova) Alexander Cozbinov (Czech Republic) Jan Šátral	(Russia) Artem Dubrivnyy (Turkey) Sarp Ağabigün (Russia) Aristarkh Safonov (Turkey) Yankı Erel
April 5	Saint Petersburg, Russia; Hard (indoor); M15; Singles and Doubles Draws	(Moldova) Alexander Cozbinov (Sweden) Simon Freund; 6–4, 7–5	(Japan) Naoki Tajima (Russia) Alexey Zakharov	(Moldova) Alexander Cozbinov (Czech Republic) Jan Šátral	(Russia) Artem Dubrivnyy (Turkey) Sarp Ağabigün (Russia) Aristarkh Safonov (Turkey) Yankı Erel
April 5	Monastir, Tunisia; Hard; M15; Singles and Doubles Draws	(Italy) Franco Agamenone; 6–7^{(2–7)}, 6–3, 6–2	(France) Antoine Escoffier	(United States) Evan Zhu (Germany) Christoph Negritu	(Germany) Robert Strombachs (Ivory Coast) Eliakim Coulibaly (Japan) Sho Shimabukuro (Russia) Alen Avidzba
April 5	Monastir, Tunisia; Hard; M15; Singles and Doubles Draws	(Italy) Franco Agamenone (Poland) Piotr Matuszewski; 7–6^{(9–7)}, 7–5	(Brazil) Mateus Alves (Brazil) Igor Marcondes	(United States) Evan Zhu (Germany) Christoph Negritu	(Germany) Robert Strombachs (Ivory Coast) Eliakim Coulibaly (Japan) Sho Shimabukuro (Russia) Alen Avidzba
April 5	Antalya, Turkey; Clay; M15; Singles and Doubles Draws	(Italy) Flavio Cobolli; 0–6, 6–3, 6–3	(Sweden) Dragoș Nicolae Mădăraș	(Italy) Matteo Gigante (Italy) Edoardo Eremin	(Spain) Pablo Llamas Ruiz (Italy) Davide Galoppini (Japan) Shintaro Mochizuki (Czech Republic) Adam Pavlásek
April 5	Antalya, Turkey; Clay; M15; Singles and Doubles Draws	(Japan) Shintaro Mochizuki (Japan) Rio Noguchi; 7–6^{(7–2)}, 6–2	(Germany) Benjamin Hassan (Germany) Constantin Schmitz	(Italy) Matteo Gigante (Italy) Edoardo Eremin	(Spain) Pablo Llamas Ruiz (Italy) Davide Galoppini (Japan) Shintaro Mochizuki (Czech Republic) Adam Pavlásek
April 12	Meerbusch, Germany; Clay; M25; Singles and Doubles Draws	(Austria) Alexander Erler; 6–2, 4–6, 7–5	(France) Arthur Cazaux	(Germany) Elmar Ejupovic (Austria) David Pichler	(Germany) Peter Heller (Germany) Milan Welte (Czech Republic) Michael Vrbenský (Germany) Tim Handel
April 12	Meerbusch, Germany; Clay; M25; Singles and Doubles Draws	(Czech Republic) Jiří Lehečka (Czech Republic) Michael Vrbenský; 6–3, 6–3	(Norway) Viktor Durasovic (Sweden) Markus Eriksson	(Germany) Elmar Ejupovic (Austria) David Pichler	(Germany) Peter Heller (Germany) Milan Welte (Czech Republic) Michael Vrbenský (Germany) Tim Handel
April 12	Reus, Spain; Clay; M25; Singles and Doubles Draws	(France) Matteo Martineau; 6–4, 2–6, 7–6^{(7–4)}	(United States) Emilio Nava	(Japan) Shintaro Mochizuki (Spain) Pol Martín Tiffon	(Switzerland) Johan Nikles (Portugal) Nuno Borges (France) Titouan Droguet (France) Johan Tatlot
April 12	Reus, Spain; Clay; M25; Singles and Doubles Draws	(France) Arthur Fils (France) Giovanni Mpetshi Perricard; 6–4, 7–5	(United States) Hunter Johnson (United States) Yates Johnson	(Japan) Shintaro Mochizuki (Spain) Pol Martín Tiffon	(Switzerland) Johan Nikles (Portugal) Nuno Borges (France) Titouan Droguet (France) Johan Tatlot
April 12	Cairo, Egypt; Clay; M15; Singles and Doubles Draws	(Italy) Francesco Passaro; 6–1, 6–4	(Italy) Giacomo Dambrosi	(Italy) Luigi Sorrentino (Poland) Daniel Michalski	(Argentina) Bautista Vilicich (Italy) Edoardo Lavagno (Austria) Lukas Krainer (Spain) Carlos López Montagud
April 12	Cairo, Egypt; Clay; M15; Singles and Doubles Draws	(Italy) Daniele Capecchi (Italy) Francesco Passaro; 7–5, 6–4	(United Kingdom) Luke Johnson (Ukraine) Volodymyr Uzhylovskyi	(Italy) Luigi Sorrentino (Poland) Daniel Michalski	(Argentina) Bautista Vilicich (Italy) Edoardo Lavagno (Austria) Lukas Krainer (Spain) Carlos López Montagud
April 12	Shymkent, Kazakhstan; Clay; M15; Singles and Doubles Draws	(Ukraine) Eric Vanshelboim; 6–1, 6–1	(Russia) Ivan Gakhov	(Russia) Andrey Chepelev (Spain) José Francisco Vidal Azorín	(Ukraine) Nikita Mashtakov (Switzerland) Damien Wenger (Italy) Antonio Campo (Italy) Luca Tomasetto
April 12	Shymkent, Kazakhstan; Clay; M15; Singles and Doubles Draws	(Russia) Ivan Denisov (Russia) Ivan Gakhov; 3–6, 7–5, [10–5]	(Belarus) Ivan Liutarevich (Ukraine) Vladyslav Manafov	(Russia) Andrey Chepelev (Spain) José Francisco Vidal Azorín	(Ukraine) Nikita Mashtakov (Switzerland) Damien Wenger (Italy) Antonio Campo (Italy) Luca Tomasetto
April 12	Saint Petersburg, Russia; Hard (indoor); M15; Singles and Doubles Draws	(Turkey) Yankı Erel; 6–1, 6–4	(Russia) Savriyan Danilov	(Japan) Naoki Tajima (Slovenia) Matic Špec	(Russia) Evgenii Tiurnev (Russia) Marat Sharipov (Russia) Alexey Zakharov (Turkey) Sarp Ağabigün
April 12	Saint Petersburg, Russia; Hard (indoor); M15; Singles and Doubles Draws	(Moldova) Alexander Cozbinov (Sweden) Simon Freund; 7–6^{(7–5)}, 2–6, [10–6]	(Japan) Naoki Tajima (Russia) Alexey Zakharov	(Japan) Naoki Tajima (Slovenia) Matic Špec	(Russia) Evgenii Tiurnev (Russia) Marat Sharipov (Russia) Alexey Zakharov (Turkey) Sarp Ağabigün
April 12	Monastir, Tunisia; Hard; M15; Singles and Doubles Draws	(Italy) Franco Agamenone; 6–2, 6–3	(Ivory Coast) Eliakim Coulibaly	(Russia) Savva Polukhin (Austria) Maximilian Neuchrist	(Japan) Shintaro Imai (France) Benjamin Pietri (Brazil) Gilbert Klier Júnior (Japan) Sho Shimabukuro
April 12	Monastir, Tunisia; Hard; M15; Singles and Doubles Draws	(Brazil) Gilbert Klier Júnior (Brazil) Igor Marcondes; 6–2, 6–3	(Burundi) Guy Orly Iradukunda (France) Louis Tessa	(Russia) Savva Polukhin (Austria) Maximilian Neuchrist	(Japan) Shintaro Imai (France) Benjamin Pietri (Brazil) Gilbert Klier Júnior (Japan) Sho Shimabukuro
April 12	Antalya, Turkey; Clay; M15; Singles and Doubles Draws	(Romania) Nicolae Frunză; 6–2, 6–1	(Italy) Gianmarco Ferrari	(Italy) Davide Galoppini (Austria) Sandro Kopp	(Hungary) Mátyás Füle (Italy) Antonio Massara (Italy) Matteo Arnaldi (South Korea) Kim Cheong-eui
April 12	Antalya, Turkey; Clay; M15; Singles and Doubles Draws	(Portugal) Tiago Cação (Germany) Constantin Schmitz; 6–4, 6–2	(Turkey) Umut Akkoyun (Turkey) Cengiz Aksu	(Italy) Davide Galoppini (Austria) Sandro Kopp	(Hungary) Mátyás Füle (Italy) Antonio Massara (Italy) Matteo Arnaldi (South Korea) Kim Cheong-eui
April 19	Angers, France; Clay (indoor); M25; Singles and Doubles Draws	(France) Manuel Guinard; 7–5, 6–4	(Monaco) Lucas Catarina	(Chinese Taipei) Tseng Chun-hsin (France) Giovanni Mpetshi Perricard	(France) Maxime Hamou (France) Corentin Denolly (Spain) Álvaro López San Martín (France) Arthur Cazaux
April 19	Angers, France; Clay (indoor); M25; Singles and Doubles Draws	(France) Corentin Denolly (France) Manuel Guinard; Walkover	(France) Arthur Cazaux (France) Titouan Droguet	(Chinese Taipei) Tseng Chun-hsin (France) Giovanni Mpetshi Perricard	(France) Maxime Hamou (France) Corentin Denolly (Spain) Álvaro López San Martín (France) Arthur Cazaux
April 19	Šibenik, Croatia; Clay; M15; Singles and Doubles Draws	(Bosnia and Herzegovina) Aldin Šetkić; 7–6^{(7–5)}, 6–3	(Austria) David Pichler	(Croatia) Duje Kekez (Germany) Sebastian Prechtel	(Italy) Lorenzo Bocchi (Croatia) Mili Poljičak (Hungary) Gergely Madarász (Austria) Alexander Erler
April 19	Šibenik, Croatia; Clay; M15; Singles and Doubles Draws	(Croatia) Zvonimir Babić (Austria) David Pichler; 6–3, 6–4	(Croatia) Borna Devald (Croatia) Mili Poljičak	(Croatia) Duje Kekez (Germany) Sebastian Prechtel	(Italy) Lorenzo Bocchi (Croatia) Mili Poljičak (Hungary) Gergely Madarász (Austria) Alexander Erler
April 19	Cairo, Egypt; Clay; M15; Singles and Doubles Draws	(United States) Oliver Crawford; 6–2, 5–7, 6–3	(Poland) Daniel Michalski	(Spain) Benjamín Winter López (Italy) Daniele Capecchi	(Argentina) Alex Barrena (Spain) José Francisco Vidal Azorín (Japan) Shintaro Mochizuki (Argentina) Juan Ignacio Galarza
April 19	Cairo, Egypt; Clay; M15; Singles and Doubles Draws	(Kazakhstan) Grigoriy Lomakin (Germany) Kai Wehnelt; 6–4, 6–2	(Argentina) Juan Ignacio Galarza (Argentina) Juan Pablo Paz	(Spain) Benjamín Winter López (Italy) Daniele Capecchi	(Argentina) Alex Barrena (Spain) José Francisco Vidal Azorín (Japan) Shintaro Mochizuki (Argentina) Juan Ignacio Galarza
April 19	Monastir, Tunisia; Hard; M15; Singles and Doubles Draws	(Germany) Christoph Negritu; 6–2, 6–2	(Brazil) Igor Marcondes	(Brazil) Oscar José Gutierrez (Italy) Omar Giacalone	(Sweden) Simon Yitbarek (Sweden) Jonathan Mridha (Lithuania) Laurynas Grigelis (South Korea) Chung Yun-seong
April 19	Monastir, Tunisia; Hard; M15; Singles and Doubles Draws	(Tunisia) Anis Ghorbel (Brazil) Oscar José Gutierrez; 6–3, 1–6, [10–8]	(Brazil) Igor Marcondes (Brazil) Gilbert Klier Júnior	(Brazil) Oscar José Gutierrez (Italy) Omar Giacalone	(Sweden) Simon Yitbarek (Sweden) Jonathan Mridha (Lithuania) Laurynas Grigelis (South Korea) Chung Yun-seong
April 19	Antalya, Turkey; Clay; M15; Singles and Doubles Draws	(Belgium) Christopher Heyman; 6–2, 4–6, 6–2	(Hungary) Fábián Marozsán	(Italy) Francesco Forti (Romania) Nicolae Frunză	(Belgium) Jeroen Vanneste (Japan) Shunsuke Mitsui (Italy) Federico Arnaboldi (Ukraine) Oleksandr Ovcharenko
April 19	Antalya, Turkey; Clay; M15; Singles and Doubles Draws	(Hungary) Péter Fajta (Hungary) Fábián Marozsán; 7–5, 7–6^{(7–3)}	(Italy) Emiliano Maggioli (Ukraine) Oleksandr Ovcharenko	(Italy) Francesco Forti (Romania) Nicolae Frunză	(Belgium) Jeroen Vanneste (Japan) Shunsuke Mitsui (Italy) Federico Arnaboldi (Ukraine) Oleksandr Ovcharenko
April 26	Cairo, Egypt; Clay; M15; Singles and Doubles Draws	(Chile) Bastián Malla; 4–6, 6–1, 6–2	(United Kingdom) Jack Pinnington Jones	(Spain) José Francisco Vidal Azorín (Spain) Carlos Sánchez Jover	(Argentina) Bautista Vilicich (United States) Oliver Crawford (Italy) Edoardo Lavagno (Argentina) Mariano Navone
April 26	Cairo, Egypt; Clay; M15; Singles and Doubles Draws	(Argentina) Juan Ignacio Galarza (Argentina) Juan Pablo Paz; 6–3, 6–1	(Argentina) Alex Barrena (Argentina) Santiago de la Fuente	(Spain) José Francisco Vidal Azorín (Spain) Carlos Sánchez Jover	(Argentina) Bautista Vilicich (United States) Oliver Crawford (Italy) Edoardo Lavagno (Argentina) Mariano Navone
April 26	Las Palmas, Spain; Clay; M15; Singles and Doubles Draws	(Spain) Álvaro López San Martín; 7–6^{(8–6)}, 6–7^{(4–7)}, 7–5	(France) Kyrian Jacquet	(Kazakhstan) Timofey Skatov (Spain) Eduard Esteve Lobato	(Italy) Alessandro Bega (Russia) Alexander Shevchenko (Switzerland) Johan Nikles (Turkey) Ergi Kırkın
April 26	Las Palmas, Spain; Clay; M15; Singles and Doubles Draws	(Spain) Alberto Barroso Campos (Spain) Albert Roglan; 6–7^{(6–8)}, 6–4, [10–7]	(Spain) Eduard Esteve Lobato (Spain) David Marrero	(Kazakhstan) Timofey Skatov (Spain) Eduard Esteve Lobato	(Italy) Alessandro Bega (Russia) Alexander Shevchenko (Switzerland) Johan Nikles (Turkey) Ergi Kırkın
April 26	Monastir, Tunisia; Hard; M15; Singles and Doubles Draws	(Monaco) Lucas Catarina; 6–0, 6–0	(France) Benjamin Pietri	(South Korea) Chung Yun-seong (Japan) Yuta Kawahashi	(France) Arthur Bouquier (Brazil) Gilbert Klier Júnior (Switzerland) Rémy Bertola (Russia) Alibek Kachmazov
April 26	Monastir, Tunisia; Hard; M15; Singles and Doubles Draws	(South Korea) Chung Yun-seong (Japan) Shintaro Imai; 6–2, 7–6^{(7–4)}	(Sweden) Filip Bergevi (Sweden) Jonathan Mridha	(South Korea) Chung Yun-seong (Japan) Yuta Kawahashi	(France) Arthur Bouquier (Brazil) Gilbert Klier Júnior (Switzerland) Rémy Bertola (Russia) Alibek Kachmazov
April 26	Antalya, Turkey; Clay; M15; Singles and Doubles Draws	(Belgium) Jeroen Vanneste; 6–4, 6–3	(Switzerland) Sandro Ehrat	(Belgium) Christopher Heyman (Germany) Peter Heller	(Italy) Samuel Vincent Ruggeri (Italy) Francesco Forti (Japan) Rio Noguchi (Ukraine) Oleksii Krutykh
April 26	Antalya, Turkey; Clay; M15; Singles and Doubles Draws	(Switzerland) Sandro Ehrat (Switzerland) Louroi Martinez; 3–6, 6–4, [13–11]	(Italy) Emiliano Maggioli (Ukraine) Oleksandr Ovcharenko	(Belgium) Christopher Heyman (Germany) Peter Heller	(Italy) Samuel Vincent Ruggeri (Italy) Francesco Forti (Japan) Rio Noguchi (Ukraine) Oleksii Krutykh

=== May ===
Week of	Tournament	Winner	Runners-up	Semifinalists	Quarterfinalists
May 3	Cairo, Egypt; Clay; M15; Singles and Doubles Draws	(Brazil) Matheus Pucinelli de Almeida; 7–5, 1–0, ret.	(Bulgaria) Simon Anthony Ivanov	(Spain) José Francisco Vidal Azorín (United States) Oliver Crawford	(United Kingdom) Paul Jubb (Spain) Carlos Sánchez Jover (Republic of Ireland) Simon Carr (Bulgaria) Gabriel Donev
May 3	Cairo, Egypt; Clay; M15; Singles and Doubles Draws	(Spain) Carlos Sánchez Jover (Spain) José Francisco Vidal Azorín; 7–5, 6–3	(Republic of Ireland) Simon Carr (Germany) Kai Wehnelt	(Spain) José Francisco Vidal Azorín (United States) Oliver Crawford	(United Kingdom) Paul Jubb (Spain) Carlos Sánchez Jover (Republic of Ireland) Simon Carr (Bulgaria) Gabriel Donev
May 3	Ramat HaSharon, Israel; Hard; M15; Singles and Doubles Draws	(Israel) Ben Patael; 6–4, 6–4	(Israel) Yshai Oliel	(Israel) Edan Leshem (United States) Felix Corwin	(Moldova) Alexander Cozbinov (United States) Zane Khan (Ukraine) Marat Deviatiarov (Bulgaria) Alexandar Lazarov
May 3	Ramat HaSharon, Israel; Hard; M15; Singles and Doubles Draws	(United States) Felix Corwin (United States) Reese Stalder; 2–6, 7–5, [15–13]	(Sweden) Filip Bergevi (Sweden) Simon Freund	(Israel) Edan Leshem (United States) Felix Corwin	(Moldova) Alexander Cozbinov (United States) Zane Khan (Ukraine) Marat Deviatiarov (Bulgaria) Alexandar Lazarov
May 3	Majadahonda, Spain; Clay; M15; Singles and Doubles Draws	(Switzerland) Johan Nikles; 6–4, 6–3	(Portugal) Nuno Borges	(France) Matteo Martineau (Spain) Oriol Roca Batalla	(Spain) Eduard Esteve Lobato (United States) Alex Rybakov (Ukraine) Georgii Kravchenko (Spain) Pedro Vives Marcos
May 3	Majadahonda, Spain; Clay; M15; Singles and Doubles Draws	(Switzerland) Leandro Riedi (Switzerland) Dominic Stricker; 2–6, 6–2, [12–10]	(Spain) Alberto Barroso Campos (Switzerland) Johan Nikles	(France) Matteo Martineau (Spain) Oriol Roca Batalla	(Spain) Eduard Esteve Lobato (United States) Alex Rybakov (Ukraine) Georgii Kravchenko (Spain) Pedro Vives Marcos
May 3	Monastir, Tunisia; Hard; M15; Singles and Doubles Draws	(Italy) Luca Potenza; 1–6, 6–2, 6–1	(Monaco) Lucas Catarina	(Tunisia) Aziz Dougaz (Bulgaria) Alexander Donski	(Japan) Yusuke Takahashi (Brazil) Gustavo Heide (Russia) Alibek Kachmazov (Italy) Erik Crepaldi
May 3	Monastir, Tunisia; Hard; M15; Singles and Doubles Draws	(South Korea) Chung Yun-seong (Japan) Shintaro Imai; 6–3, 6–2	(Tunisia) Aziz Dougaz (Zimbabwe) Benjamin Lock	(Tunisia) Aziz Dougaz (Bulgaria) Alexander Donski	(Japan) Yusuke Takahashi (Brazil) Gustavo Heide (Russia) Alibek Kachmazov (Italy) Erik Crepaldi
May 3	Antalya, Turkey; Clay; M15; Singles and Doubles Draws	(Austria) Alexander Erler; 6–4, 6–1	(Bulgaria) Adrian Andreev	(Brazil) Orlando Luz (Switzerland) Sandro Ehrat	(Romania) Filip Cristian Jianu (Dominican Republic) Nick Hardt (Northern Mariana Islands) Colin Sinclair (Austria) Sandro Kopp
May 3	Antalya, Turkey; Clay; M15; Singles and Doubles Draws	(Brazil) Orlando Luz (Brazil) Gabriel Roveri Sidney; 6–2, 7–6^{(7–2)}	(Switzerland) Sandro Ehrat (Austria) Alexander Erler	(Brazil) Orlando Luz (Switzerland) Sandro Ehrat	(Romania) Filip Cristian Jianu (Dominican Republic) Nick Hardt (Northern Mariana Islands) Colin Sinclair (Austria) Sandro Kopp
May 10	Prague, Czech Republic; Clay; M25; Singles and Doubles Draws	(France) Manuel Guinard; 6–4, 6–3	(United Kingdom) Jack Draper	(Czech Republic) Dalibor Svrčina (Chinese Taipei) Tseng Chun-hsin	(United States) Thai-Son Kwiatkowski (Austria) Lucas Miedler (Italy) Riccardo Bonadio (Czech Republic) Jiří Lehečka
May 10	Prague, Czech Republic; Clay; M25; Singles and Doubles Draws	(Italy) Franco Agamenone (Poland) Piotr Matuszewski; 6–4, 6–3	(Czech Republic) Andrew Paulson (Czech Republic) Patrik Rikl	(Czech Republic) Dalibor Svrčina (Chinese Taipei) Tseng Chun-hsin	(United States) Thai-Son Kwiatkowski (Austria) Lucas Miedler (Italy) Riccardo Bonadio (Czech Republic) Jiří Lehečka
May 10	Prijedor, Bosnia and Herzegovina; Clay; M15; Singles and Doubles Draws	(Bosnia and Herzegovina) Aldin Šetkić; 6–3, 4–6, 6–2	(Bosnia and Herzegovina) Nerman Fatić	(Kazakhstan) Denis Yevseyev (Serbia) Hamad Međedović	(Croatia) Alen Rogić Hadžalić (Serbia) Miljan Zekić (Hungary) Gergely Madarász (Brazil) Matheus Pucinelli de Almeida
May 10	Prijedor, Bosnia and Herzegovina; Clay; M15; Singles and Doubles Draws	(Serbia) Hamad Međedović (Serbia) Marko Tepavac; 6–1, 6–4	(North Macedonia) Stefan Micov (Croatia) Alen Rogić Hadžalić	(Kazakhstan) Denis Yevseyev (Serbia) Hamad Međedović	(Croatia) Alen Rogić Hadžalić (Serbia) Miljan Zekić (Hungary) Gergely Madarász (Brazil) Matheus Pucinelli de Almeida
May 10	Troisdorf, Germany; Clay; M15; Singles and Doubles Draws	(Germany) Elmar Ejupovic; 7–6^{(7–4)}, 6–2	(Belgium) Michael Geerts	(Germany) Timo Stodder (Germany) Sebastian Fanselow	(Germany) Lucas Gerch (Slovenia) Tom Kočevar-Dešman (Belgium) Yannick Mertens (Germany) Louis Wessels
May 10	Troisdorf, Germany; Clay; M15; Singles and Doubles Draws	(France) Dan Added (United Kingdom) Luke Johnson; 6–4, 6–4	(Argentina) Juan Ignacio Galarza (Argentina) Juan Pablo Paz	(Germany) Timo Stodder (Germany) Sebastian Fanselow	(Germany) Lucas Gerch (Slovenia) Tom Kočevar-Dešman (Belgium) Yannick Mertens (Germany) Louis Wessels
May 10	Jerusalem, Israel; Hard; M15; Singles and Doubles Draws	(United States) Zane Khan; 6–3, 6–4	(Israel) Edan Leshem	(Israel) Yshai Oliel (Bulgaria) Alexandar Lazarov	(The Bahamas) Justin Roberts (Israel) Ben Patael (United States) Felix Corwin (Czech Republic) Marek Gengel
May 10	Jerusalem, Israel; Hard; M15; Singles and Doubles Draws	(Moldova) Alexander Cozbinov (Ukraine) Marat Deviatiarov; Walkover	(United Kingdom) Julian Cash (United States) Felix Corwin	(Israel) Yshai Oliel (Bulgaria) Alexandar Lazarov	(The Bahamas) Justin Roberts (Israel) Ben Patael (United States) Felix Corwin (Czech Republic) Marek Gengel
May 10	Valldoreix, Spain; Clay; M15; Singles and Doubles Draws	(Spain) Álvaro López San Martín; 2–6, 6–1, 6–4	(Uruguay) Martín Cuevas	(Argentina) Facundo Díaz Acosta (Portugal) Tiago Cação	(Argentina) Juan Bautista Otegui (Spain) Àlex Martí Pujolràs (France) Rayane Roumane (France) Louis Dussin
May 10	Valldoreix, Spain; Clay; M15; Singles and Doubles Draws	(United States) Martin Damm (United States) Alex Rybakov; 6–4, 7–6^{(7–4)}	(Portugal) Francisco Cabral (Portugal) Gonçalo Falcão	(Argentina) Facundo Díaz Acosta (Portugal) Tiago Cação	(Argentina) Juan Bautista Otegui (Spain) Àlex Martí Pujolràs (France) Rayane Roumane (France) Louis Dussin
May 10	Monastir, Tunisia; Hard; M15; Singles and Doubles Draws	(South Korea) Chung Yun-seong; 6–1, 7–5	(Tunisia) Aziz Dougaz	(Italy) Mattia Frinzi (United States) Omni Kumar	(Australia) Jeremy Beale (Switzerland) Antoine Bellier (Bulgaria) Alexander Donski (Argentina) Santiago Rodríguez Taverna
May 10	Monastir, Tunisia; Hard; M15; Singles and Doubles Draws	(Australia) Jeremy Beale (Australia) Thomas Fancutt; 6–4, 3–6, [10–6]	(Tunisia) Aziz Dougaz (Burundi) Guy Orly Iradukunda	(Italy) Mattia Frinzi (United States) Omni Kumar	(Australia) Jeremy Beale (Switzerland) Antoine Bellier (Bulgaria) Alexander Donski (Argentina) Santiago Rodríguez Taverna
May 10	Antalya, Turkey; Clay; M15; Singles and Doubles Draws	(Dominican Republic) Nick Hardt; 6–0, 7–6^{(9–7)}	(Austria) Alexander Erler	(Brazil) Orlando Luz (Italy) Francesco Forti	(Poland) Daniel Michalski (Kazakhstan) Timofey Skatov (Italy) Jacopo Berrettini (Japan) Naoki Nakagawa
May 10	Antalya, Turkey; Clay; M15; Singles and Doubles Draws	(Argentina) Ignacio Monzón (Argentina) Fermín Tenti; 6–4, 6–3	(Brazil) Orlando Luz (Brazil) Gabriel Roveri Sidney	(Brazil) Orlando Luz (Italy) Francesco Forti	(Poland) Daniel Michalski (Kazakhstan) Timofey Skatov (Italy) Jacopo Berrettini (Japan) Naoki Nakagawa
May 17	Jablonec nad Nisou, Czech Republic; Clay; M25; Singles and Doubles Draws	(Czech Republic) Jiří Lehečka; 6–3, 6–2	(Ukraine) Vitaliy Sachko	(Czech Republic) Jan Šátral (France) Evan Furness	(Czech Republic) Patrik Rikl (Italy) Franco Agamenone (Czech Republic) Andrew Paulson (United Kingdom) Jack Draper
May 17	Jablonec nad Nisou, Czech Republic; Clay; M25; Singles and Doubles Draws	(Czech Republic) Andrew Paulson (Czech Republic) Patrik Rikl; 0–6, 6–2, [10–7]	(Belarus) Uladzimir Ignatik (Ukraine) Vitaliy Sachko	(Czech Republic) Jan Šátral (France) Evan Furness	(Czech Republic) Patrik Rikl (Italy) Franco Agamenone (Czech Republic) Andrew Paulson (United Kingdom) Jack Draper
May 17	Vic, Spain; Clay; M25; Singles and Doubles Draws	(Spain) Carlos Gimeno Valero; 1–6, 6–3, 6–4	(Argentina) Pedro Cachin	(Argentina) Camilo Ugo Carabelli (Russia) Yan Bondarevskiy	(Spain) Javier Barranco Cosano (France) Corentin Denolly (Spain) Roberto Ortega Olmedo (Spain) Carlos López Montagud
May 17	Vic, Spain; Clay; M25; Singles and Doubles Draws	(Brazil) Mateus Alves (Brazil) Oscar José Gutierrez; 7–6^{(7–3)}, 6–2	(France) Corentin Denolly (Belgium) Michael Geerts	(Argentina) Camilo Ugo Carabelli (Russia) Yan Bondarevskiy	(Spain) Javier Barranco Cosano (France) Corentin Denolly (Spain) Roberto Ortega Olmedo (Spain) Carlos López Montagud
May 17	Pensacola, United States; Clay; M25; Singles and Doubles Draws	(Argentina) Nicolás Kicker; 6–7^{(4–7)}, 6–3, 6–2	(Bulgaria) Adrian Andreev	(United States) Patrick Kypson (United Kingdom) Aidan McHugh	(Colombia) Alejandro González (Japan) Shintaro Mochizuki (Dominican Republic) Peter Bertran (United States) Oliver Crawford
May 17	Pensacola, United States; Clay; M25; Singles and Doubles Draws	(United States) JC Aragone (Colombia) Nicolás Barrientos; 6–2, 4–6, [10–6]	(Colombia) Alejandro González (United States) Junior Alexander Ore	(United States) Patrick Kypson (United Kingdom) Aidan McHugh	(Colombia) Alejandro González (Japan) Shintaro Mochizuki (Dominican Republic) Peter Bertran (United States) Oliver Crawford
May 17	Brčko, Bosnia and Herzegovina; Clay; M15; Singles and Doubles Draws	(Ukraine) Eric Vanshelboim; 6–3, 6–7^{(4–7)}, 6–0	(Finland) Otto Virtanen	(Chile) Bastián Malla (Brazil) Matheus Pucinelli de Almeida	(Russia) Artem Dubrivnyy (Brazil) João Lucas Reis da Silva (Switzerland) Rémy Bertola (Serbia) Viktor Jović
May 17	Brčko, Bosnia and Herzegovina; Clay; M15; Singles and Doubles Draws	(Brazil) Gilbert Klier Júnior (Brazil) João Lucas Reis da Silva; Walkover	(Switzerland) Rémy Bertola (Austria) Maximilian Neuchrist	(Chile) Bastián Malla (Brazil) Matheus Pucinelli de Almeida	(Russia) Artem Dubrivnyy (Brazil) João Lucas Reis da Silva (Switzerland) Rémy Bertola (Serbia) Viktor Jović
May 17	Šibenik, Croatia; Clay; M15; Singles and Doubles Draws	(France) Timo Legout; 6–4, 0–6, 6–2	(Argentina) Hernán Casanova	(Hungary) Zsombor Piros (Japan) Rimpei Kawakami	(Hungary) Péter Fajta (Hungary) Fábián Marozsán (Slovenia) Tom Kočevar-Dešman (France) Dan Added
May 17	Šibenik, Croatia; Clay; M15; Singles and Doubles Draws	(France) Dan Added (Austria) David Pichler; Walkover	(Argentina) Hernán Casanova (Argentina) Matías Zukas	(Hungary) Zsombor Piros (Japan) Rimpei Kawakami	(Hungary) Péter Fajta (Hungary) Fábián Marozsán (Slovenia) Tom Kočevar-Dešman (France) Dan Added
May 17	Tbilisi, Georgia; Hard; M15; Singles and Doubles Draws	(Russia) Alexander Shevchenko; 4–6, 7–6^{(7–5)}, 6–3	(Italy) Alessandro Bega	(Turkey) Yankı Erel (Denmark) Christian Sigsgaard	(The Bahamas) Justin Roberts (United States) Zane Khan (Zimbabwe) Benjamin Lock (Czech Republic) Marek Gengel
May 17	Tbilisi, Georgia; Hard; M15; Singles and Doubles Draws	(Uzbekistan) Sanjar Fayziev (Greece) Markos Kalovelonis; 6–4, 3–6, [10–5]	(Georgia (country)) Aleksandre Bakshi (Georgia (country)) Zura Tkemaladze	(Turkey) Yankı Erel (Denmark) Christian Sigsgaard	(The Bahamas) Justin Roberts (United States) Zane Khan (Zimbabwe) Benjamin Lock (Czech Republic) Marek Gengel
May 17	Heraklion, Greece; Hard; M15; Singles and Doubles Draws	(United Kingdom) Ryan Peniston; 6–3, 6–0	(Japan) Yuta Shimizu	(Israel) Yshai Oliel (Cyprus) Petros Chrysochos	(China) Zhang Ze (Italy) Edoardo Graziani (Greece) Alexandros Skorilas (United States) Dusty Boyer
May 17	Heraklion, Greece; Hard; M15; Singles and Doubles Draws	(Cyprus) Petros Chrysochos (United Kingdom) Mark Whitehouse; 4–6, 6–2, [10–6]	(China) Hua Runhao (China) Zhang Ze	(Israel) Yshai Oliel (Cyprus) Petros Chrysochos	(China) Zhang Ze (Italy) Edoardo Graziani (Greece) Alexandros Skorilas (United States) Dusty Boyer
May 17	Monastir, Tunisia; Hard; M15; Singles and Doubles Draws	(South Korea) Chung Yun-seong; 6–4, 6–2	(Australia) Jeremy Beale	(Burundi) Guy Orly Iradukunda (Australia) Thomas Fancutt	(Switzerland) Antoine Bellier (Japan) Yusuke Takahashi (United States) Roy Smith (Brazil) Gustavo Heide
May 17	Monastir, Tunisia; Hard; M15; Singles and Doubles Draws	(Australia) Jeremy Beale (Australia) Thomas Fancutt; 6–3, 6–4	(Argentina) Tomás Farjat (Argentina) Santiago Rodríguez Taverna	(Burundi) Guy Orly Iradukunda (Australia) Thomas Fancutt	(Switzerland) Antoine Bellier (Japan) Yusuke Takahashi (United States) Roy Smith (Brazil) Gustavo Heide
May 17	Antalya, Turkey; Clay; M15; Singles and Doubles Draws	(Dominican Republic) Nick Hardt; 2–6, 7–5, 6–1	(United States) Nicolas Moreno de Alboran	(Germany) Benjamin Hassan (Italy) Francesco Forti	(Brazil) Orlando Luz (Italy) Davide Galoppini (Argentina) Mariano Navone (Italy) Luca Nardi
May 17	Antalya, Turkey; Clay; M15; Singles and Doubles Draws	(Brazil) Orlando Luz (Brazil) Gabriel Roveri Sidney; 6–7^{(0–7)}, 7–5, [10–4]	(Italy) Daniele Capecchi (Italy) Davide Galoppini	(Germany) Benjamin Hassan (Italy) Francesco Forti	(Brazil) Orlando Luz (Italy) Davide Galoppini (Argentina) Mariano Navone (Italy) Luca Nardi
May 24	Kiseljak, Bosnia and Herzegovina; Clay; M25; Singles and Doubles Draws	(Brazil) Matheus Pucinelli de Almeida; 6–4, 2–6, 6–4	(Italy) Francesco Forti	(Bosnia and Herzegovina) Aldin Šetkić (Hungary) Zsombor Piros	(Netherlands) Jelle Sels (Belgium) Gauthier Onclin (Slovakia) Lukáš Palovič (Argentina) Hernán Casanova
May 24	Kiseljak, Bosnia and Herzegovina; Clay; M25; Singles and Doubles Draws	(Brazil) João Lucas Reis da Silva (Netherlands) Jelle Sels; 4–6, 6–4, [10–4]	(Brazil) Gilbert Klier Júnior (Brazil) Matheus Pucinelli de Almeida	(Bosnia and Herzegovina) Aldin Šetkić (Hungary) Zsombor Piros	(Netherlands) Jelle Sels (Belgium) Gauthier Onclin (Slovakia) Lukáš Palovič (Argentina) Hernán Casanova
May 24	Most, Czech Republic; Clay; M25; Singles and Doubles Draws	(Czech Republic) Dalibor Svrčina; 6–4, 7–6^{(7–3)}	(Italy) Franco Agamenone	(United States) Alex Rybakov (Argentina) Facundo Díaz Acosta	(Czech Republic) Patrik Rikl (Poland) Daniel Michalski (Czech Republic) Antonín Bolardt (Netherlands) Gijs Brouwer
May 24	Most, Czech Republic; Clay; M25; Singles and Doubles Draws	(Italy) Franco Agamenone (Poland) Piotr Matuszewski; 6–1, 7–5	(Netherlands) Gijs Brouwer (Netherlands) Mats Hermans	(United States) Alex Rybakov (Argentina) Facundo Díaz Acosta	(Czech Republic) Patrik Rikl (Poland) Daniel Michalski (Czech Republic) Antonín Bolardt (Netherlands) Gijs Brouwer
May 24	Kouvola, Finland; Hard; M15; Singles and Doubles Draws	(United Kingdom) Anton Matusevich; 6–1, 4–6, 6–0	(Japan) Naoki Tajima	(Italy) Alessandro Bega (Italy) Lorenzo Rottoli	(Moldova) Alexander Cozbinov (Hungary) Zsombor Velcz (Switzerland) Luca Castelnuovo (Finland) Otto Virtanen
May 24	Kouvola, Finland; Hard; M15; Singles and Doubles Draws	(Moldova) Alexander Cozbinov (Italy) Francesco Vilardo; 6–2, 6–3	(Switzerland) Luca Castelnuovo (Switzerland) Yannik Steinegger	(Italy) Alessandro Bega (Italy) Lorenzo Rottoli	(Moldova) Alexander Cozbinov (Hungary) Zsombor Velcz (Switzerland) Luca Castelnuovo (Finland) Otto Virtanen
May 24	Heraklion, Greece; Hard; M15; Singles and Doubles Draws	(United Kingdom) Ryan Peniston; 6–4, 6–1	(China) Zhang Ze	(United Kingdom) Daniel Cox (Italy) Federico Arnaboldi	(Cyprus) Menelaos Efstathiou (United Kingdom) Arthur Fery (United Kingdom) Luke Johnson (Israel) Yishai Oliel
May 24	Heraklion, Greece; Hard; M15; Singles and Doubles Draws	(United Kingdom) Julian Cash (United States) Reese Stalder; 6–7^{(6–8)}, 6–0, [10–8]	(United Kingdom) Billy Harris (United Kingdom) George Houghton	(United Kingdom) Daniel Cox (Italy) Federico Arnaboldi	(Cyprus) Menelaos Efstathiou (United Kingdom) Arthur Fery (United Kingdom) Luke Johnson (Israel) Yishai Oliel
May 24	Shymkent, Kazakhstan; Clay; M15; Singles and Doubles Draws	(Italy) Edoardo Lavagno; 6–3, 6–0	(Russia) Alexander Shevchenko	(Switzerland) Damien Wenger (Uzbekistan) Sanjar Fayziev	(Russia) Yan Bondarevskiy (Belarus) Ivan Liutarevich (France) Tak Khunn Wang (Russia) Ivan Gakhov
May 24	Shymkent, Kazakhstan; Clay; M15; Singles and Doubles Draws	(Russia) Yan Bondarevskiy (Kazakhstan) Grigoriy Lomakin; 6–3, 6–4	(Uzbekistan) Sanjar Fayziev (Greece) Markos Kalovelonis	(Switzerland) Damien Wenger (Uzbekistan) Sanjar Fayziev	(Russia) Yan Bondarevskiy (Belarus) Ivan Liutarevich (France) Tak Khunn Wang (Russia) Ivan Gakhov
May 24	Bucharest, Romania; Clay; M15; Singles and Doubles Draws	(Sweden) Dragoș Nicolae Mădăraș; 2–6, 6–3, 6–2	(Spain) Pol Toledo Bagué	(Belarus) Uladzimir Ignatik (France) Alexis Gautier	(France) Jaimee Floyd Angele (Romania) Cezar Crețu (Romania) David Ionel (Romania) Nicolae Frunză
May 24	Bucharest, Romania; Clay; M15; Singles and Doubles Draws	(Argentina) Juan Ignacio Galarza (Argentina) Juan Pablo Paz; 6–2, 6–3	(Romania) Vlad Andrei Dancu (Romania) Vladimir Filip	(Belarus) Uladzimir Ignatik (France) Alexis Gautier	(France) Jaimee Floyd Angele (Romania) Cezar Crețu (Romania) David Ionel (Romania) Nicolae Frunză
May 24	Marbella, Spain; Hard; M15; Singles and Doubles Draws	(Belgium) Yannick Mertens; 6–2, 6–1	(Chile) Diego Fernández Flores	(Argentina) Román Andrés Burruchaga (Spain) Nicolás Álvarez Varona	(Israel) Edan Leshem (Switzerland) Antoine Bellier (Spain) Alejandro Moro Cañas (Spain) Imanol López Morillo
May 24	Marbella, Spain; Hard; M15; Singles and Doubles Draws	(Spain) Alberto Barroso Campos (Spain) Benjamín Winter López; 6–4, 6–0	(France) Clément Deleersnyder (France) Arthur Reymond	(Argentina) Román Andrés Burruchaga (Spain) Nicolás Álvarez Varona	(Israel) Edan Leshem (Switzerland) Antoine Bellier (Spain) Alejandro Moro Cañas (Spain) Imanol López Morillo
May 24	Monastir, Tunisia; Hard; M15; Singles and Doubles Draws	(Ivory Coast) Eliakim Coulibaly; 2–6, 6–2, 7–6^{(7–1)}	(Australia) Thomas Fancutt	(Japan) Naoki Nakagawa (South Korea) Park Ui-sung	(United States) Roy Smith (Argentina) Santiago Rodríguez Taverna (Austria) Lukas Neumayer (South Korea) Chung Yun-seong
May 24	Monastir, Tunisia; Hard; M15; Singles and Doubles Draws	(Australia) Jeremy Beale (Australia) Thomas Fancutt; 6–4, 6–4	(India) Siddhant Banthia (New Zealand) Ajeet Rai	(Japan) Naoki Nakagawa (South Korea) Park Ui-sung	(United States) Roy Smith (Argentina) Santiago Rodríguez Taverna (Austria) Lukas Neumayer (South Korea) Chung Yun-seong
May 24	Antalya, Turkey; Clay; M15; Singles and Doubles Draws	(Brazil) Orlando Luz; 6–4, 3–6, 6–4	(Italy) Giacomo Dambrosi	(Italy) Matteo Gigante (Spain) Pol Martín Tiffon	(United States) Nicolas Moreno de Alboran (United Kingdom) Stuart Parker (Germany) Lucas Gerch (Argentina) Mariano Navone
May 24	Antalya, Turkey; Clay; M15; Singles and Doubles Draws	(Uruguay) Ignacio Carou (Brazil) Orlando Luz; 7–5, 1–6, [10–7]	(Italy) Andrea Basso (Italy) Daniele Capecchi	(Italy) Matteo Gigante (Spain) Pol Martín Tiffon	(United States) Nicolas Moreno de Alboran (United Kingdom) Stuart Parker (Germany) Lucas Gerch (Argentina) Mariano Navone
May 24	Novomoskovsk, Ukraine; Clay; M15; Singles and Doubles Draws	(Ukraine) Oleksii Krutykh; 7–6^{(7–3)}, 7–5	(Spain) José Francisco Vidal Azorín	(Spain) Carlos Sánchez Jover (United Kingdom) Felix Gill	(Russia) Ivan Nedelko (Argentina) Fermín Tenti (Italy) Matteo Arnaldi (Ukraine) Nikita Mashtakov
May 24	Novomoskovsk, Ukraine; Clay; M15; Singles and Doubles Draws	(Ukraine) Danylo Kalenichenko (Ukraine) Nikita Mashtakov; 5–7, 6–4, [10–8]	(Spain) Carlos Sánchez Jover (Spain) José Francisco Vidal Azorín	(Spain) Carlos Sánchez Jover (United Kingdom) Felix Gill	(Russia) Ivan Nedelko (Argentina) Fermín Tenti (Italy) Matteo Arnaldi (Ukraine) Nikita Mashtakov
May 31	Santo Domingo, Dominican Republic; Hard; M25; Singles and Doubles Draws	(United Kingdom) Aidan McHugh; 7–5, 3–6, 6–3	(Argentina) Nicolás Kicker	(Dominican Republic) Nick Hardt (United States) Roy Smith	(United States) Christian Langmo (Colombia) Juan Sebastián Gómez (France) Calvin Hemery (United States) Kyle Seelig
May 31	Santo Domingo, Dominican Republic; Hard; M25; Singles and Doubles Draws	(Ecuador) Diego Hidalgo (Brazil) Igor Marcondes; 7–5, 6–7^{(10–12)}, [10–6]	(Peru) Conner Huertas del Pino (Peru) Jorge Panta	(Dominican Republic) Nick Hardt (United States) Roy Smith	(United States) Christian Langmo (Colombia) Juan Sebastián Gómez (France) Calvin Hemery (United States) Kyle Seelig
May 31	Sarajevo, Bosnia and Herzegovina; Clay; M15; Singles and Doubles Draws	(Argentina) Hernán Casanova; 6–2, 6–0	(Brazil) Matheus Pucinelli de Almeida	(Hungary) Gergely Madarász (Brazil) João Lucas Reis da Silva	(Tunisia) Skander Mansouri (Italy) Federico Iannaccone (United Kingdom) Luka Petrovic (Belgium) Gauthier Onclin
May 31	Sarajevo, Bosnia and Herzegovina; Clay; M15; Singles and Doubles Draws	(Croatia) Domagoj Bilješko (Croatia) Frane Ninčević; 6–2, 3–6, [10–4]	(Brazil) Gilbert Klier Júnior (Brazil) João Lucas Reis da Silva	(Hungary) Gergely Madarász (Brazil) João Lucas Reis da Silva	(Tunisia) Skander Mansouri (Italy) Federico Iannaccone (United Kingdom) Luka Petrovic (Belgium) Gauthier Onclin
May 31	Helsinki, Finland; Clay; M15; Singles and Doubles Draws	(France) Kyrian Jacquet; 6–1, 6–2	(France) Lilian Marmousez	(Monaco) Lucas Catarina (Sweden) Karl Friberg	(France) Clément Tabur (United States) Bruno Kuzuhara (France) Jaimee Floyd Angele (France) Titouan Droguet
May 31	Helsinki, Finland; Clay; M15; Singles and Doubles Draws	(Colombia) Cristian Rodríguez (Netherlands) Glenn Smits; 7–6^{(8–6)}, 6–2	(France) Titouan Droguet (France) Jonathan Eysseric	(Monaco) Lucas Catarina (Sweden) Karl Friberg	(France) Clément Tabur (United States) Bruno Kuzuhara (France) Jaimee Floyd Angele (France) Titouan Droguet
May 31	Heraklion, Greece; Hard; M15; Singles and Doubles Draws	(Israel) Ben Patael; 6–1, 6–4	(Italy) Federico Arnaboldi	(Spain) Nicolás Álvarez Varona (Japan) Yuki Mochizuki	(United Kingdom) Billy Harris (France) Ugo Blanchet (United States) Reese Stalder (China) Zhang Ze
May 31	Heraklion, Greece; Hard; M15; Singles and Doubles Draws	(Japan) Yuki Mochizuki (Japan) Takuto Niki; 6–3, 6–4	(China) Hua Runhao (China) Zhang Ze	(Spain) Nicolás Álvarez Varona (Japan) Yuki Mochizuki	(United Kingdom) Billy Harris (France) Ugo Blanchet (United States) Reese Stalder (China) Zhang Ze
May 31	Shymkent, Kazakhstan; Clay; M15; Singles and Doubles Draws	(Italy) Edoardo Lavagno; 5–7, 6–2, 6–3	(Russia) Yan Bondarevskiy	(Russia) Ivan Gakhov (Kazakhstan) Beibit Zhukayev	(Georgia (country)) Aleksandre Metreveli (Russia) Alexander Shevchenko (Kazakhstan) Grigoriy Lomakin (Ukraine) Vladyslav Manafov
May 31	Shymkent, Kazakhstan; Clay; M15; Singles and Doubles Draws	(Russia) Yan Bondarevskiy (Kazakhstan) Grigoriy Lomakin; 7–5, 6–2	(Russia) Marat Sharipov (Kazakhstan) Beibit Zhukayev	(Russia) Ivan Gakhov (Kazakhstan) Beibit Zhukayev	(Georgia (country)) Aleksandre Metreveli (Russia) Alexander Shevchenko (Kazakhstan) Grigoriy Lomakin (Ukraine) Vladyslav Manafov
May 31	Skopje, North Macedonia; Clay; M15; Singles and Doubles Draws	(France) Alexis Gautier; 6–2, 3–6, 6–2	(Netherlands) Ryan Nijboer	(Serbia) Miljan Zekić (Czech Republic) Dalibor Svrčina	(Romania) David Ionel (Germany) Oscar Moraing (Bulgaria) Alexandar Lazarov (Italy) Alexander Weis
May 31	Skopje, North Macedonia; Clay; M15; Singles and Doubles Draws	(United States) Martin Damm (Czech Republic) Robin Staněk; 6–2, 7–6^{(7–5)}	(Netherlands) Max Houkes (Netherlands) Sidané Pontjodikromo	(Serbia) Miljan Zekić (Czech Republic) Dalibor Svrčina	(Romania) David Ionel (Germany) Oscar Moraing (Bulgaria) Alexandar Lazarov (Italy) Alexander Weis
May 31	Monastir, Tunisia; Hard; M15; Singles and Doubles Draws	(Turkey) Yankı Erel; 4–6, 6–1, 6–2	(Argentina) Santiago Rodríguez Taverna	(Argentina) Alejo Lorenzo Lingua Lavallén (New Zealand) Ajeet Rai	(South Korea) Park Ui-sung (Argentina) Juan Bautista Torres (Germany) Robert Strombachs (Italy) Mauro De Maio
May 31	Monastir, Tunisia; Hard; M15; Singles and Doubles Draws	(Australia) Jeremy Beale (Australia) Thomas Fancutt; 6–1, 7–5	(Argentina) Tomás Farjat (Argentina) Santiago Rodríguez Taverna	(Argentina) Alejo Lorenzo Lingua Lavallén (New Zealand) Ajeet Rai	(South Korea) Park Ui-sung (Argentina) Juan Bautista Torres (Germany) Robert Strombachs (Italy) Mauro De Maio
May 31	Antalya, Turkey; Clay; M15; Singles and Doubles Draws	(United States) Nicolas Moreno de Alboran; 7–5, 6–4	(Italy) Giovanni Fonio	(Chile) Gonzalo Lama (Switzerland) Sandro Ehrat	(Italy) Pietro Rondoni (United Kingdom) Stuart Parker (United States) Toby Kodat (Switzerland) Jakub Paul
May 31	Antalya, Turkey; Clay; M15; Singles and Doubles Draws	(United States) Toby Kodat (Germany) Timo Stodder; 6–4, 6–4	(Argentina) Mariano Navone (Chile) Miguel Fernando Pereira	(Chile) Gonzalo Lama (Switzerland) Sandro Ehrat	(Italy) Pietro Rondoni (United Kingdom) Stuart Parker (United States) Toby Kodat (Switzerland) Jakub Paul
May 31	Novomoskovsk, Ukraine; Clay; M15; Singles and Doubles Draws	(Argentina) Matías Zukas; 6–4, 0–6, 6–4	(Ukraine) Danylo Kalenichenko	(Spain) Àlex Martí Pujolràs (Ukraine) Illya Beloborodko	(Ukraine) Aleksandr Braynin (Belarus) Alexander Zgirovsky (Ukraine) Yurii Dzhavakian (Latvia) Mārtiņš Podžus
May 31	Novomoskovsk, Ukraine; Clay; M15; Singles and Doubles Draws	(Ukraine) Aleksandr Braynin (Kazakhstan) Timur Maulenov; Walkover	(Spain) Carlos Sánchez Jover (Spain) José Francisco Vidal Azorín	(Spain) Àlex Martí Pujolràs (Ukraine) Illya Beloborodko	(Ukraine) Aleksandr Braynin (Belarus) Alexander Zgirovsky (Ukraine) Yurii Dzhavakian (Latvia) Mārtiņš Podžus

=== June ===
Week of	Tournament	Winner	Runners-up	Semifinalists	Quarterfinalists
June 7	Santo Domingo, Dominican Republic; Hard; M25; Singles and Doubles Draws	(Argentina) Nicolás Kicker; 6–7^{(5–7)}, 6–1, 7–6^{(7–2)}	(Brazil) Igor Marcondes	(Mexico) Alex Hernández (Dominican Republic) Peter Bertran	(Mexico) Luis Patiño (Peru) Conner Huertas del Pino (Colombia) Juan Sebastián Gómez (United States) Evan Zhu
June 7	Santo Domingo, Dominican Republic; Hard; M25; Singles and Doubles Draws	(Peru) Conner Huertas del Pino (Peru) Jorge Panta; 7–6^{(9–7)}, 2–6, [10–7]	(Ecuador) Diego Hidalgo (Brazil) Igor Marcondes	(Mexico) Alex Hernández (Dominican Republic) Peter Bertran	(Mexico) Luis Patiño (Peru) Conner Huertas del Pino (Colombia) Juan Sebastián Gómez (United States) Evan Zhu
June 7	Wichita, United States; Hard; M25; Singles and Doubles Draws	(United States) Govind Nanda; 7–6^{(8–6)}, 6–2	(United States) Patrick Kypson	(Japan) Sho Shimabukuro (United States) Felix Corwin	(Chile) Matías Soto (Greece) Michail Pervolarakis (United States) Zachary Svajda (Argentina) Genaro Alberto Olivieri
June 7	Wichita, United States; Hard; M25; Singles and Doubles Draws	(Chile) Nicolás Acevedo (Bolivia) Murkel Dellien; 6–4, 2–6, [12–10]	(United States) John McNally (Canada) Benjamin Sigouin	(Japan) Sho Shimabukuro (United States) Felix Corwin	(Chile) Matías Soto (Greece) Michail Pervolarakis (United States) Zachary Svajda (Argentina) Genaro Alberto Olivieri
June 7	Heraklion, Greece; Hard; M15; Singles and Doubles Draws	(Japan) Yuki Mochizuki; 7–5, 6–2	(Israel) Ben Patael	(France) Alexis Musialek (United Kingdom) Billy Harris	(Israel) Yasha Zemel (Argentina) Román Andrés Burruchaga (United Kingdom) Giles Hussey (United States) William Griffith
June 7	Heraklion, Greece; Hard; M15; Singles and Doubles Draws	(China) Hua Runhao (China) Zhang Ze; 6–2, 6–7^{(6–8)}, [10–7]	(Japan) Makoto Ochi (Ukraine) Volodymyr Uzhylovskyi	(France) Alexis Musialek (United Kingdom) Billy Harris	(Israel) Yasha Zemel (Argentina) Román Andrés Burruchaga (United Kingdom) Giles Hussey (United States) William Griffith
June 7	Gaiba, Italy; Grass; M15; Singles and Doubles Draws	(Germany) Mats Rosenkranz; 7–6^{(13–11)}, 7–6^{(7–5)}	(Zimbabwe) Benjamin Lock	(Russia) Kirill Kivattsev (Switzerland) Antoine Bellier	(Italy) Alessandro Bega (France) Arthur Reymond (Italy) Mattia Frinzi (Germany) Tobias Simon
June 7	Gaiba, Italy; Grass; M15; Singles and Doubles Draws	(France) Arthur Reymond (Italy) Augusto Virgili; 7–5, 6–4	(Italy) Luciano Darderi (Austria) David Pichler	(Russia) Kirill Kivattsev (Switzerland) Antoine Bellier	(Italy) Alessandro Bega (France) Arthur Reymond (Italy) Mattia Frinzi (Germany) Tobias Simon
June 7	Skopje, North Macedonia; Clay; M15; Singles and Doubles Draws	(Serbia) Miljan Zekić; 6–4, 7–6^{(7–5)}	(Bulgaria) Alexandar Lazarov	(Italy) Simone Roncalli (France) Alexis Gautier	(Romania) David Ionel (United States) Martin Damm (France) Ronan Joncour (Italy) Daniele Capecchi
June 7	Skopje, North Macedonia; Clay; M15; Singles and Doubles Draws	(Netherlands) Gijs Brouwer (Moldova) Alexander Cozbinov; 6–1, 6–2	(Tunisia) Aziz Ouakaa (France) Jean Thirouin	(Italy) Simone Roncalli (France) Alexis Gautier	(Romania) David Ionel (United States) Martin Damm (France) Ronan Joncour (Italy) Daniele Capecchi
June 7	Monastir, Tunisia; Hard; M15; Singles and Doubles Draws	(Burundi) Guy Orly Iradukunda; 6–2, 4–6, 7–6^{(7–2)}	(Argentina) Santiago Rodríguez Taverna	(Australia) Jeremy Beale (Ivory Coast) Eliakim Coulibaly	(South Korea) Nam Ji-sung (South Korea) Hong Seong-chan (Argentina) Juan Bautista Torres (Turkey) Yankı Erel
June 7	Monastir, Tunisia; Hard; M15; Singles and Doubles Draws	(India) Siddhant Banthia (South Korea) Park Ui-sung; Walkover	(Australia) Jeremy Beale (New Zealand) Ajeet Rai	(Australia) Jeremy Beale (Ivory Coast) Eliakim Coulibaly	(South Korea) Nam Ji-sung (South Korea) Hong Seong-chan (Argentina) Juan Bautista Torres (Turkey) Yankı Erel
June 7	Antalya, Turkey; Clay; M15; Singles and Doubles Draws	(Chile) Gonzalo Lama; 6–4, 6–2	(Argentina) Francisco Comesaña	(Czech Republic) Martin Krumich (Switzerland) Damien Wenger	(Italy) Riccardo Balzerani (Romania) Alexandru Jecan (Germany) Timo Stodder (Switzerland) Sandro Ehrat
June 7	Antalya, Turkey; Clay; M15; Singles and Doubles Draws	(Chinese Taipei) Hsu Yu-hsiou (Chile) Miguel Fernando Pereira; 7–6^{(8–6)}, 2–6, [11–9]	(Romania) Cezar Crețu (Romania) Alexandru Jecan	(Czech Republic) Martin Krumich (Switzerland) Damien Wenger	(Italy) Riccardo Balzerani (Romania) Alexandru Jecan (Germany) Timo Stodder (Switzerland) Sandro Ehrat
June 14	Grasse, France; Clay; M25; Singles and Doubles Draws	(Spain) Álvaro López San Martín; 7–6^{(8–6)}, 7–5	(France) Valentin Royer	(France) Jurgen Briand (Italy) Franco Agamenone	(Netherlands) Gijs Brouwer (France) Émilien Voisin (France) Clément Tabur (Serbia) Miljan Zekić
June 14	Grasse, France; Clay; M25; Singles and Doubles Draws	(France) Dan Added (Switzerland) Leandro Riedi; 6–1, 6–4	(Italy) Franco Agamenone (Poland) Piotr Matuszewski	(France) Jurgen Briand (Italy) Franco Agamenone	(Netherlands) Gijs Brouwer (France) Émilien Voisin (France) Clément Tabur (Serbia) Miljan Zekić
June 14	Tulsa, United States; Hard; M25; Singles and Doubles Draws	(Argentina) Nicolás Kicker; 6–4, 6–0	(Argentina) Genaro Alberto Olivieri	(Colombia) Nicolás Barrientos (United States) Sam Riffice	(United States) Ezekiel Clark (Greece) Michail Pervolarakis (United States) Govind Nanda (United States) Gage Brymer
June 14	Tulsa, United States; Hard; M25; Singles and Doubles Draws	(United States) Strong Kirchheimer (Greece) Michail Pervolarakis; 6–1, 4–6, [10–7]	(United States) JC Aragone (Colombia) Nicolás Barrientos	(Colombia) Nicolás Barrientos (United States) Sam Riffice	(United States) Ezekiel Clark (Greece) Michail Pervolarakis (United States) Govind Nanda (United States) Gage Brymer
June 14	Genova, Italy; Clay; M15; Singles and Doubles Draws	(Italy) Luca Nardi; 6–4, 6–2	(Switzerland) Johan Nikles	(Italy) Edoardo Eremin (Italy) Giovanni Fonio	(Italy) Davide Galoppini (Sweden) Dragoș Nicolae Mădăraș (France) Johan Tatlot (Switzerland) Rémy Bertola
June 14	Genova, Italy; Clay; M15; Singles and Doubles Draws	(Switzerland) Rémy Bertola (Italy) Giorgio Ricca; 6–3, 7–5	(Argentina) Juan Ignacio Galarza (Argentina) Juan Pablo Paz	(Italy) Edoardo Eremin (Italy) Giovanni Fonio	(Italy) Davide Galoppini (Sweden) Dragoș Nicolae Mădăraș (France) Johan Tatlot (Switzerland) Rémy Bertola
June 14	Monastir, Tunisia; Hard; M15; Singles and Doubles Draws	(Italy) Luciano Darderi; 6–3, 7–5	(Argentina) Santiago Rodríguez Taverna	(Portugal) Tiago Cação (Argentina) Alejo Lorenzo Lingua Lavallén	(Tunisia) Moez Echargui (Spain) Imanol López Morillo (Australia) Kody Pearson (Italy) Luca Giacomini
June 14	Monastir, Tunisia; Hard; M15; Singles and Doubles Draws	(South Korea) Hong Seong-chan (South Korea) Nam Ji-sung; 6–3, 6–1	(Argentina) Matías Franco Descotte (Canada) Filip Peliwo	(Portugal) Tiago Cação (Argentina) Alejo Lorenzo Lingua Lavallén	(Tunisia) Moez Echargui (Spain) Imanol López Morillo (Australia) Kody Pearson (Italy) Luca Giacomini
June 14	Antalya, Turkey; Clay; M15; Singles and Doubles Draws	(Chile) Gonzalo Lama; 6–2, 6–3	(Russia) Savva Polukhin	(Poland) Paweł Ciaś (Uruguay) Francisco Llanes	(Argentina) Mariano Kestelboim (Argentina) Matías Zukas (Argentina) Francisco Comesaña (Turkey) Marsel İlhan
June 14	Antalya, Turkey; Clay; M15; Singles and Doubles Draws	(Argentina) Francisco Comesaña (Argentina) Mariano Kestelboim; 5–7, 6–4, [10–4]	(Chinese Taipei) Hsu Yu-hsiou (Chinese Taipei) Lee Kuan-yi	(Poland) Paweł Ciaś (Uruguay) Francisco Llanes	(Argentina) Mariano Kestelboim (Argentina) Matías Zukas (Argentina) Francisco Comesaña (Turkey) Marsel İlhan
June 21	Montauban, France; Clay; M25; Singles and Doubles Draws	(Italy) Franco Agamenone; 6–2, 6–1	(France) Jonathan Eysseric	(France) Arthur Cazaux (France) Valentin Royer	(France) Dan Added (Brazil) Oscar José Gutierrez (Norway) Viktor Durasovic (France) Antoine Escoffier
June 21	Montauban, France; Clay; M25; Singles and Doubles Draws	(Italy) Franco Agamenone (France) Antoine Escoffier; 6–1, 7–5	(France) Arthur Bouquier (France) Louis Dussin	(France) Arthur Cazaux (France) Valentin Royer	(France) Dan Added (Brazil) Oscar José Gutierrez (Norway) Viktor Durasovic (France) Antoine Escoffier
June 21	Alkmaar, Netherlands; Clay; M25; Singles and Doubles Draws	(Netherlands) Jelle Sels; 6–1, 6–3	(Spain) Nicolás Álvarez Varona	(Belgium) Christopher Heyman (Spain) Javier Barranco Cosano	(Germany) Marvin Möller (Netherlands) Gijs Brouwer (Serbia) Marko Tepavac (Germany) Kai Wehnelt
June 21	Alkmaar, Netherlands; Clay; M25; Singles and Doubles Draws	(Netherlands) Jesper de Jong (Netherlands) Sander Jong; 6–0, 4–6, [10–6]	(Netherlands) Gijs Brouwer (Netherlands) Jelle Sels	(Belgium) Christopher Heyman (Spain) Javier Barranco Cosano	(Germany) Marvin Möller (Netherlands) Gijs Brouwer (Serbia) Marko Tepavac (Germany) Kai Wehnelt
June 21	Klosters, Switzerland; Clay; M25; Singles and Doubles Draws	(United States) Nicolas Moreno de Alboran; 6–4, 6–3	(Italy) Francesco Forti	(Switzerland) Dominic Stricker (Switzerland) Jakub Paul	(Netherlands) Mick Veldheer (Brazil) Matheus Pucinelli de Almeida (Switzerland) Henry von der Schulenburg (Tunisia) Aziz Dougaz
June 21	Klosters, Switzerland; Clay; M25; Singles and Doubles Draws	(Germany) Fabian Fallert (United States) Nicolas Moreno de Alboran; 4–6, 7–6^{(7–1)}, [10–6]	(Switzerland) Leandro Riedi (Switzerland) Dominic Stricker	(Switzerland) Dominic Stricker (Switzerland) Jakub Paul	(Netherlands) Mick Veldheer (Brazil) Matheus Pucinelli de Almeida (Switzerland) Henry von der Schulenburg (Tunisia) Aziz Dougaz
June 21	Bergamo, Italy; Clay; M15; Singles and Doubles Draws	(Italy) Federico Arnaboldi; 6–1, 6–2	(Italy) Riccardo Balzerani	(Italy) Matteo Arnaldi (Italy) Alexander Weis	(Germany) Marvin Netuschil (Italy) Samuel Vincent Ruggeri (Italy) Luca Nardi (Argentina) Juan Ignacio Galarza
June 21	Bergamo, Italy; Clay; M15; Singles and Doubles Draws	(Argentina) Román Andrés Burruchaga (Argentina) Juan Ignacio Galarza; 6–4, 6–3	(United States) Dali Blanch (Brazil) Pedro Boscardin Dias	(Italy) Matteo Arnaldi (Italy) Alexander Weis	(Germany) Marvin Netuschil (Italy) Samuel Vincent Ruggeri (Italy) Luca Nardi (Argentina) Juan Ignacio Galarza
June 21	Monastir, Tunisia; Hard; M15; Singles and Doubles Draws	(United States) Omni Kumar; 7–6^{(8–6)}, 6–3	(Italy) Luciano Darderi	(South Korea) Park Ui-sung (Spain) Imanol López Morillo	(Tunisia) Moez Echargui (France) Térence Atmane (Argentina) Santiago Rodríguez Taverna (South Korea) Lee Duck-hee
June 21	Monastir, Tunisia; Hard; M15; Singles and Doubles Draws	(United Kingdom) Julian Cash (United Kingdom) Mark Whitehouse; 7–6^{(7–1)}, 6–3	(New Zealand) Ajeet Rai (Spain) Benjamín Winter López	(South Korea) Park Ui-sung (Spain) Imanol López Morillo	(Tunisia) Moez Echargui (France) Térence Atmane (Argentina) Santiago Rodríguez Taverna (South Korea) Lee Duck-hee
June 21	Antalya, Turkey; Clay; M15; Singles and Doubles Draws	(Argentina) Facundo Juárez; 6–7^{(2–7)}, 6–2, 6–3	(Argentina) Francisco Comesaña	(Argentina) Mariano Kestelboim (Hungary) Fábián Marozsán	(Uruguay) Ignacio Carou (Italy) Andrea Picchione (Argentina) Lorenzo Joaquín Rodríguez (Ukraine) Olexiy Kolisnyk
June 21	Antalya, Turkey; Clay; M15; Singles and Doubles Draws	(Brazil) Daniel Dutra da Silva (Argentina) Mariano Kestelboim; 4–6, 7–5, [13–11]	(Ukraine) Olexiy Kolisnyk (Ukraine) Oleg Prihodko	(Argentina) Mariano Kestelboim (Hungary) Fábián Marozsán	(Uruguay) Ignacio Carou (Italy) Andrea Picchione (Argentina) Lorenzo Joaquín Rodríguez (Ukraine) Olexiy Kolisnyk
June 21	Champaign, United States; Hard; M15; Singles and Doubles Draws	(Australia) Jason Kubler; 6–2, 6–1	(Canada) Gabriel Diallo	(United States) Gage Brymer (United States) Kyle Seelig	(United States) Christian Langmo (United States) Kweisi Kenyatte (South Africa) Khololwam Montsi (Greece) Michail Pervolarakis
June 21	Champaign, United States; Hard; M15; Singles and Doubles Draws	(United Kingdom) Finn Bass (United Kingdom) Tom Hands; 7–5, 6–4	(United States) Kweisi Kenyatte (South Africa) Siphosothando Montsi	(United States) Gage Brymer (United States) Kyle Seelig	(United States) Christian Langmo (United States) Kweisi Kenyatte (South Africa) Khololwam Montsi (Greece) Michail Pervolarakis
June 28	Bourg-en-Bresse, France; Clay; M25; Singles and Doubles Draws	(Norway) Viktor Durasovic; 6–1, 6–1	(Italy) Franco Agamenone	(France) Matteo Martineau (France) Clément Tabur	(Switzerland) Damien Wenger (Switzerland) Jakub Paul (France) Jurgen Briand (Brazil) Matheus Pucinelli de Almeida
June 28	Bourg-en-Bresse, France; Clay; M25; Singles and Doubles Draws	(Sweden) Markus Eriksson (Switzerland) Jakub Paul; 7–6^{(8–6)}, 6–7^{(3–7)}, [10–4]	(Switzerland) Leandro Riedi (Switzerland) Damien Wenger	(France) Matteo Martineau (France) Clément Tabur	(Switzerland) Damien Wenger (Switzerland) Jakub Paul (France) Jurgen Briand (Brazil) Matheus Pucinelli de Almeida
June 28	The Hague, Netherlands; Clay; M25; Singles and Doubles Draws	(Spain) Javier Barranco Cosano; 2–6, 6–1, 6–1	(Netherlands) Jelle Sels	(Switzerland) Johan Nikles (Netherlands) Tim van Rijthoven	(France) Manuel Guinard (Brazil) Mateus Alves (Serbia) Marko Tepavac (Belgium) Christopher Heyman
June 28	The Hague, Netherlands; Clay; M25; Singles and Doubles Draws	(Netherlands) Jesper de Jong (Netherlands) Bart Stevens; 6–3, 6–4	(Netherlands) Gijs Brouwer (Netherlands) Jelle Sels	(Switzerland) Johan Nikles (Netherlands) Tim van Rijthoven	(France) Manuel Guinard (Brazil) Mateus Alves (Serbia) Marko Tepavac (Belgium) Christopher Heyman
June 28	Wrocław, Poland; Clay; M25; Singles and Doubles Draws	(Argentina) Hernán Casanova; 6–1, 6–3	(Brazil) Orlando Luz	(Brazil) Oscar José Gutierrez (Belarus) Uladzimir Ignatik	(United States) Toby Kodat (Ukraine) Vladyslav Orlov (Brazil) Daniel Dutra da Silva (Russia) Alexander Shevchenko
June 28	Wrocław, Poland; Clay; M25; Singles and Doubles Draws	(Brazil) Oscar José Gutierrez (Brazil) Orlando Luz; 7–6^{(8–6)}, 2–6, [11–9]	(Italy) Marco Bortolotti (Colombia) Cristian Rodríguez	(Brazil) Oscar José Gutierrez (Belarus) Uladzimir Ignatik	(United States) Toby Kodat (Ukraine) Vladyslav Orlov (Brazil) Daniel Dutra da Silva (Russia) Alexander Shevchenko
June 28	Belgrade, Serbia; Clay; M25; Singles and Doubles Draws	(Dominican Republic) Nick Hardt; 3–6, 6–3, 6–3	(Israel) Daniel Cukierman	(Bulgaria) Alexandar Lazarov (Australia) Akira Santillan	(Italy) Edoardo Lavagno (Tunisia) Skander Mansouri (Serbia) Miljan Zekić (France) Quentin Folliot
June 28	Belgrade, Serbia; Clay; M25; Singles and Doubles Draws	(Italy) Giovanni Oradini (Serbia) Strahinja Rakić; 6–3, 4–6, [10–7]	(Israel) Daniel Cukierman (United States) Andrew Fenty	(Bulgaria) Alexandar Lazarov (Australia) Akira Santillan	(Italy) Edoardo Lavagno (Tunisia) Skander Mansouri (Serbia) Miljan Zekić (France) Quentin Folliot
June 28	Bakio, Spain; Hard; M25; Singles and Doubles Draws	(France) Hugo Grenier; 6–0, 6–1	(Spain) Adrián Menéndez Maceiras	(Japan) Hiroki Moriya (United States) Christian Harrison	(Spain) Iñaki Montes de la Torre (Japan) Kaichi Uchida (Spain) Miguel Damas (Spain) John Echeverría
June 28	Bakio, Spain; Hard; M25; Singles and Doubles Draws	(Spain) Iñaki Montes de la Torre (Spain) Antonio Prat; 6–2, 4–6, [10–6]	(Spain) Adrián Menéndez Maceiras (Spain) Roberto Ortega Olmedo	(Japan) Hiroki Moriya (United States) Christian Harrison	(Spain) Iñaki Montes de la Torre (Japan) Kaichi Uchida (Spain) Miguel Damas (Spain) John Echeverría
June 28	Monastir, Tunisia; Hard; M15; Singles and Doubles Draws	(South Korea) Hong Seong-chan; 7–5, 6–3	(Italy) Luca Giacomini	(Tunisia) Moez Echargui (United States) Omni Kumar	(Argentina) Tomás Farjat (Lebanon) Hady Habib (Argentina) Santiago Rodríguez Taverna (Spain) Imanol López Morillo
June 28	Monastir, Tunisia; Hard; M15; Singles and Doubles Draws	(South Korea) Hong Seong-chan (South Korea) Nam Ji-sung; 6–2, 6–4	(Russia) Timur Kiyamov (Canada) Kelsey Stevenson	(Tunisia) Moez Echargui (United States) Omni Kumar	(Argentina) Tomás Farjat (Lebanon) Hady Habib (Argentina) Santiago Rodríguez Taverna (Spain) Imanol López Morillo
June 28	Antalya, Turkey; Clay; M15; Singles and Doubles Draws	(Czech Republic) Patrik Rikl; 6–3, 3–6, 6–3	(Romania) Nicolae Frunză	(Argentina) Francisco Comesaña (Spain) Carlos Sánchez Jover	(Argentina) Mariano Kestelboim (Spain) José Francisco Vidal Azorín (Turkey) Marsel İlhan (Argentina) Facundo Juárez
June 28	Antalya, Turkey; Clay; M15; Singles and Doubles Draws	(Russia) Vladimir Korolev (Chile) Miguel Fernando Pereira; 6–1, 6–3	(Ukraine) Olexiy Kolisnyk (Ukraine) Oleg Prihodko	(Argentina) Francisco Comesaña (Spain) Carlos Sánchez Jover	(Argentina) Mariano Kestelboim (Spain) José Francisco Vidal Azorín (Turkey) Marsel İlhan (Argentina) Facundo Juárez
June 28	Weston, United States; Clay; M15; Singles and Doubles Draws	(Canada) Liam Draxl vs (United States) Stefan Kozlov; The final was abandoned due to poor weather with the match tied at 6–7^{(5–7)}, 6–3.		(Argentina) Gonzalo Villanueva (United States) Ryan Harrison	(United States) Cannon Kingsley (United States) Strong Kirchheimer (Mexico) Gerardo López Villaseñor (United States) Christian Langmo
June 28	Weston, United States; Clay; M15; Singles and Doubles Draws	Doubles competition was abandoned due to poor weather		(Argentina) Gonzalo Villanueva (United States) Ryan Harrison	(United States) Cannon Kingsley (United States) Strong Kirchheimer (Mexico) Gerardo López Villaseñor (United States) Christian Langmo
