= 2022 Queen's Club Championships – Doubles =

Doubles
- 2022 Queen's Club Championships

Final
- Champions: (Croatia) Nikola Mektić (Croatia) Mate Pavić
- Runners-up: (United Kingdom) Lloyd Glasspool (Finland) Harri Heliövaara
- Score: 3–6, 7–6^{(7–3)}, [10–6]

Details
- Draw: 16

Events
Singles	Doubles
WC Singles	WC Doubles
← 2021 ·	Queen's Club Championships	· 2023 →

Nikola Mektić and Mate Pavić defeated Lloyd Glasspool and Harri Heliövaara in the final, 3–6, 7–6^{(7–3)}, [10–6] to win the doubles tennis title at the 2022 Queen's Club Championships. It was their third ATP Tour doubles title of the season and their 12th title overall together.

Pierre-Hugues Herbert and Nicolas Mahut were the defending champions, but only Mahut returned to defend his title, partnering with Édouard Roger-Vasselin; the pair lost in the first round to Glasspool and Heliövaara.

== Seeds ==
1. (United States) Rajeev Ram / (United Kingdom) Joe Salisbury (quarterfinals)
2. (Croatia) Nikola Mektić / (Croatia) Mate Pavić (champions)
3. (Netherlands) Wesley Koolhof / (United Kingdom) Neal Skupski (first round)
4. (Colombia) Juan Sebastián Cabal / (Colombia) Robert Farah (quarterfinals)

== Draw ==
=== Key ===
- Q = Qualifier
- WC = Wild card
- LL = Lucky loser
- Alt = Alternate
- SE = Special exempt
- PR = Protected ranking
- ITF = ITF entry
- JE = Junior exempt
- w/o = Walkover
- r = Retired
- d = Defaulted
- SR = Special ranking

=== Draw ===
First round
1	(United States) R Ram (United Kingdom) J Salisbury	7^{7}	7^{7}
(United Kingdom) J Murray (Brazil) B Soares	6^{2}	6^{3}
(France) N Mahut (France) É Roger-Vasselin	5	3
WC	(United Kingdom) L Glasspool (Finland) H Heliövaara	7	6
4	(Colombia) JS Cabal (Colombia) R Farah	3	6	[10]
Q	(Sweden) A Göransson (Japan) B McLachlan	6	3	[4]
(India) R Bopanna (Canada) D Shapovalov	7^{8}	6
(Spain) P Martínez (Argentina) D Schwartzman	6^{6}	4
(Bulgaria) G Dimitrov (United Kingdom) D Evans	6	6^{3}	[6]
(United States) T Fritz (United States) T Paul	2	7^{7}	[10]
(Australia) A de Minaur (United Kingdom) C Norrie	7^{7}	5	[10]
3	(Netherlands) W Koolhof (United Kingdom) N Skupski	6^{4}	7	[6]
(Australia) J Peers (Slovakia) F Polášek	6	6
PR	(United States) F Tiafoe (Switzerland) S Wawrinka	2	3
WC	(United Kingdom) J O'Mara (United Kingdom) K Skupski	4	2
2	(Croatia) N Mektić (Croatia) M Pavić	6	6

Quarterfinals
1	(United States) R Ram (United Kingdom) J Salisbury	6^{8}	2
WC	(United Kingdom) L Glasspool (Finland) H Heliövaara	7^{10}	6
4	(Colombia) JS Cabal (Colombia) R Farah	3	4
(India) R Bopanna (Canada) D Shapovalov	6	6
(United States) T Fritz (United States) T Paul	6	6
(Australia) A de Minaur (United Kingdom) C Norrie	4	4
(Australia) J Peers (Slovakia) F Polášek	6	5	[9]
2	(Croatia) N Mektić (Croatia) M Pavić	4	7	[11]

Semifinals
WC	(United Kingdom) L Glasspool (Finland) H Heliövaara	7	6^{4}	[10]
(India) R Bopanna (Canada) D Shapovalov	5	7^{7}	[4]
(United States) T Fritz (United States) T Paul	7	2	[8]
2	(Croatia) N Mektić (Croatia) M Pavić	5	6	[10]

Final
WC	(United Kingdom) L Glasspool (Finland) H Heliövaara	6	6^{3}	[6]
2	(Croatia) N Mektić (Croatia) M Pavić	3	7^{7}	[10]

== Qualifying ==
=== Seeds ===
1. (Sweden) André Göransson / (Japan) Ben McLachlan (qualified)
2. (Kazakhstan) Aleksandr Nedovyesov / (Pakistan) Aisam-ul-Haq Qureshi (qualifying competition)

=== Qualifiers ===
1. (Sweden) André Göransson / (Japan) Ben McLachlan

=== Qualifying draw ===
First round
1	(Sweden) André Göransson (Japan) Ben McLachlan	6	6
WC	(United Kingdom) Jay Clarke (United Kingdom) Alastair Gray	2	4
(Kazakhstan) Alexander Bublik (Finland) Emil Ruusuvuori	3	4
2	(Kazakhstan) Aleksandr Nedovyesov (Pakistan) Aisam-ul-Haq Qureshi	6	6

Qualifying competition
1	(Sweden) André Göransson (Japan) Ben McLachlan	6	6
2	(Kazakhstan) Aleksandr Nedovyesov (Pakistan) Aisam-ul-Haq Qureshi	4	4
