= 2023 Queen's Club Championships – Singles =

Singles
- 2023 Queen's Club Championships

Final
- Champion: (Spain) Carlos Alcaraz
- Runner-up: (Australia) Alex de Minaur
- Score: 6–4, 6–4

Details
- Draw: 32 (4Q / 3WC)
- Seeds: 8

Events
Singles	Doubles
- Queen's Club Championships

Carlos Alcaraz defeated Alex de Minaur in the final, 6–4, 6–4 to win the singles tennis title at the 2023 Queen's Club Championships. By winning the title, Alcaraz reclaimed the ATP no. 1 singles ranking from Novak Djokovic. It was his first title on grass.

Matteo Berrettini was the two-time reigning champion, but withdrew before his first-round match.

== Seeds ==
1. (Spain) Carlos Alcaraz (champion)
2. (Denmark) Holger Rune (semifinals)
3. (United States) Taylor Fritz (second round)
4. (United States) Frances Tiafoe (second round)
5. (United Kingdom) Cameron Norrie (quarterfinals)
6. (Italy) Lorenzo Musetti (quarterfinals)
7. (Australia) Alex de Minaur (final)
8. (Argentina) Francisco Cerúndolo (second round)

== Draw ==
Key

- Q = Qualifier
- WC = Wild card
- LL = Lucky loser
- Alt = Alternate
- ITF = ITF entry
- PR = Protected ranking
- SR = Special ranking
- SE = Special exempt
- JE = Junior exempt
- JR = Junior Accelerator Programme entrant
- CO = College Accelerator Programme entrant
- NG = Next Gen Accelerator Program entrant
- w/o = Walkover
- r = Retired
- d = Defaulted

=== Finals ===
Semifinals
1	(Spain) Carlos Alcaraz	6	6
(United States) Sebastian Korda	3	4
7	(Australia) Alex de Minaur	6	7^{7}
2	(Denmark) Holger Rune	3	6^{2}

Final
1	(Spain) Carlos Alcaraz	6	6
7	(Australia) Alex de Minaur	4	4

=== Top half ===
First round
1	(Spain) C Alcaraz	4	7	7^{7}
LL	(France) A Rinderknech	6	5	6^{3}
(Czech Republic) J Lehečka	7^{7}	6
(Spain) A Davidovich Fokina	6^{4}	3
Q	(Bulgaria) G Dimitrov	6	6
(Finland) E Ruusuvuori	2	4
Q	(United States) T Paul	6^{2}	6	4
8	(Argentina) F Cerúndolo	7^{7}	4	6
4	(United States) F Tiafoe	6	6
(Netherlands) B van de Zandschulp	2	4
(United States) S Korda	6	7
(United Kingdom) D Evans	4	5
SE	(Australia) J Thompson	6	6
LL	(Australia) A Popyrin	4	4
(Serbia) M Kecmanović	4	6^{5}
5	(United Kingdom) C Norrie	6	7^{7}

Second round
1	(Spain) C Alcaraz	6	6
(Czech Republic) J Lehečka	2	3
Q	(Bulgaria) G Dimitrov	6	7
8	(Argentina) F Cerúndolo	3	5
4	(United States) F Tiafoe	6^{2}	3
(United States) S Korda	7^{7}	6
SE	(Australia) J Thompson	6	3	2
5	(United Kingdom) C Norrie	4	6	6

Quarterfinals
1	(Spain) C Alcaraz	6	6
Q	(Bulgaria) G Dimitrov	4	4
(United States) S Korda	6	7^{7}
5	(United Kingdom) C Norrie	4	6^{1}

Semifinals
1	(Spain) C Alcaraz	6	6
(United States) S Korda	3	4

=== Bottom half ===
First round
7	(Australia) A de Minaur	6	6
(United Kingdom) A Murray	3	1
(Argentina) D Schwartzman	6	6
Q	(United States) M McDonald	2	4
(France) A Mannarino	1	6	6
WC	(United Kingdom) L Broady	6	4	3
(Spain) B Zapata Miralles	4	5
3	(United States) T Fritz	6	7
6	(Italy) L Musetti	6	6
WC	(United Kingdom) J Choinski	4	2
LL	(United States) JJ Wolf	6^{4}	6^{2}
(United States) B Shelton	7^{7}	7^{7}
(France) U Humbert	4	2
WC	(United Kingdom) R Peniston	6	6
(United States) M Cressy	6^{4}	6^{3}
2	(Denmark) H Rune	7^{7}	7^{7}

Second round
7	(Australia) A de Minaur	6	6
(Argentina) D Schwartzman	2	2
(France) A Mannarino	6	7^{9}
3	(United States) T Fritz	4	6^{7}
6	(Italy) L Musetti	6	4	6
(United States) B Shelton	4	6	4
WC	(United Kingdom) R Peniston	3	4
2	(Denmark) H Rune	6	6

Quarterfinals
7	(Australia) A de Minaur	6	4	6
(France) A Mannarino	4	6	4
6	(Italy) L Musetti	4	5
2	(Denmark) H Rune	6	7

Semifinals
7	(Australia) A de Minaur	6	7^{7}
2	(Denmark) H Rune	3	6^{2}

== Qualifying ==
=== Seeds ===
1. (United States) Tommy Paul (qualified)
2. (Bulgaria) Grigor Dimitrov (qualified)
3. (United States) J. J. Wolf (qualifying competition, lucky loser)
4. (France) Arthur Fils (qualified, withdrew)
5. (France) Constant Lestienne (first round)
6. (United States) Mackenzie McDonald (qualified)
7. (France) Arthur Rinderknech (qualifying competition, lucky loser)
8. (Australia) Alexei Popyrin (qualifying competition, lucky loser)

=== Qualifiers ===
1. (United States) Tommy Paul
2. (Bulgaria) Grigor Dimitrov
3. (United States) Mackenzie McDonald
4. (France) Arthur Fils (withdrew)

=== Lucky losers ===
1. (United States) J. J. Wolf
2. (France) Arthur Rinderknech
3. (Australia) Alexei Popyrin

=== Draw ===
==== First qualifier ====
First round
1	(United States) Tommy Paul	6	6
(Japan) Taro Daniel	3	4
WC	(United Kingdom) Billy Harris	3	7	6
5	(France) Constant Lestienne	6	5	3

Qualifying competition
1	(United States) Tommy Paul	6	6
WC	(United Kingdom) Billy Harris	3	4

==== Second qualifier ====
First round
2	(Bulgaria) Grigor Dimitrov	6	6
(Australia) Aleksandar Vukic	3	4
WC	(Spain) Feliciano López	6	3	6^{5}
7	(France) Arthur Rinderknech	3	6	7^{7}

Qualifying competition
2	(Bulgaria) Grigor Dimitrov	6	7
7	(France) Arthur Rinderknech	3	5

==== Third qualifier ====
First round
3	(United States) J. J. Wolf	6	6
Alt	(Netherlands) Jelle Sels	4	1
PR	(France) Jérémy Chardy	2	6^{4}
6	(United States) Mackenzie McDonald	6	7^{7}

Qualifying competition
3	(United States) J. J. Wolf	4	4
6	(United States) Mackenzie McDonald	6	6

==== Fourth qualifier ====
First round
4	(France) Arthur Fils	6	7^{7}
Alt	(France) Hugo Grenier	4	6^{1}
WC	(United Kingdom) Arthur Fery	6^{5}	6	3
8	(Australia) Alexei Popyrin	7^{7}	3	6

Qualifying competition
4	(France) Arthur Fils	5	7^{7}	7^{7}
8	(Australia) Alexei Popyrin	7	6^{2}	6^{3}
