= Ryan Peniston =

British tennis player (born 1995)

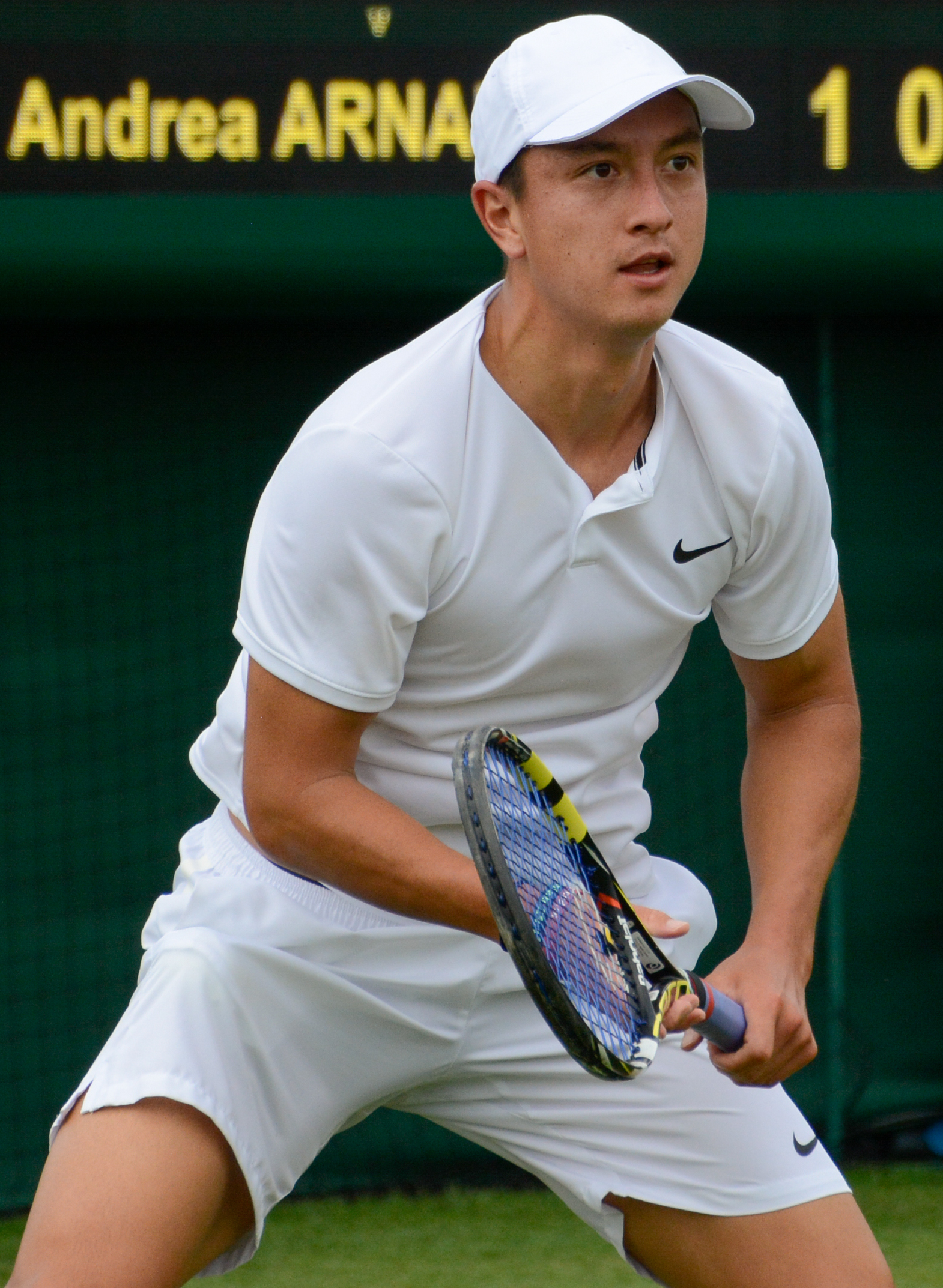
- Peniston at the 2019 Wimbledon Championships
- Full name: Ryan Harold Peniston
- Country (sports): Great Britain
- Residence: Great Wakering, Essex, England
- Born: 10 November 1995 (age 30) Southend, Essex, England
- Height: 1.83 m (6 ft 0 in)
- Turned pro: 2018
- Plays: Left-handed (two-handed backhand)
- Coach: Paul Peniston
- Prize money: $ 843,371

Singles
- Career record: 6–7
- Career titles: 0
- Highest ranking: No. 123 (18 July 2022)
- Current ranking: No. 262 (16 March 2026)

Grand Slam singles results
- Australian Open: Q2 (2024)
- French Open: Q2 (2023)
- Wimbledon: 2R (2022)
- US Open: Q1 (2022)

Doubles
- Career record: 1–3
- Career titles: 0
- Highest ranking: No. 384 (13 June 2022)
- Current ranking: No. 892 (16 March 2026)

Grand Slam doubles results
- Wimbledon: 1R (2021, 2022)

Grand Slam mixed doubles results
- Wimbledon: 1R (2021)
- Last updated on: 22 March 2026.

Ryan Harold Peniston (born 10 November 1995) is a British tennis player from Essex. He has a career-high singles ranking of world No. 123, achieved in July 2022, and a doubles ranking of world No. 384 achieved in June 2022.

== Personal life ==
Peniston was born in November 1995 to English-Irish father Paul and Malaysian mother Penny (née Gok) and grew up in Great Wakering near Rochford. He has two older brothers, Sam and Harry.

As a child, Peniston survived rhabdomyosarcoma, a soft tissue cancer, and had surgery to remove a tumour and chemotherapy. Cancer slowed his growth, and he was much smaller than his classmates until he was 16 years old. Peniston was a member of the local Great Wakering Colts. At 13, he moved to Nice, France to train at ISP Academy before going to college at 18.

A graduate of the University of Memphis tennis program, he was part of the GB University Team that won the nation's first ever team gold medal at Master'U Championships.

== Professional career ==
=== 2020: Battle of the Brits ===
During the COVID-19 pandemic in 2020, Peniston took part in the 'Battle of the Brits' tournament and performed well, losing only on final set tie-breaks against top-50 players Dan Evans and Cameron Norrie.

=== 2021: ATP doubles debut ===
Peniston won the Heraklion leg of the 2021 ITF Men's World Tennis Tour (April–June) on 30 May 2021, conceding only three games to Yuta Shimizu in winning the final in straight sets and only dropping one set in the whole tournament.

He was given a wildcard into the singles and doubles main draws of the 2021 Nottingham Open. He then received a wildcard for the 2021 Queen's Club Championships doubles main draw, playing alongside Liam Broady, and the qualifying draw in the singles. In the doubles first round, Peniston and Broady defeated Alexander Bublik and Nicholas Monroe in straight sets. In the singles qualifying, Peniston defeated Marc-Andrea Hüsler before losing to Aleksandar Vukic in 3 sets.

=== 2022: ATP debut, first Major & top-5 wins & quarterfinal, top 125 ===
Peniston made his ATP main draw singles debut at the Queen's Club Championships as a wildcard, where he upset top seed and world no. 5 Casper Ruud in straight sets for his first ever ATP Win. He reached the quarterfinals in his first ever ATP tour level tournament for the first time defeating another top-50 player Francisco Cerúndolo. As a result, he made his debut in the top 150 in the singles rankings.

At the 2022 Eastbourne International he reached the second round as a wildcard defeating 8th seed Holger Rune. Next he defeated Pedro Martínez before losing to compatriot Jack Draper in the quarterfinals.

Peniston then defeated Henri Laaksonen in straight-sets in the first round of Wimbledon. He lost in the second round to experienced American Steve Johnson.

Peniston was seeded for the qualifying for the 2022 US Open where he lost to the Italian Matteo Arnaldi.

=== 2023–2025: Wimbledon Centre Court match with Andy Murray, two Challenger titles ===
Peniston entered qualifying for the 2023 Australian Open where he lost out to Canadian Alexis Galarneau. In the qualifying for the French Open, Peniston overcame Altuğ Çelikbilek before going down in a final set against Radu Albot.

Ranked No. 201, he received a wildcard for the 2023 Queen's Club Championships and defeated Ugo Humbert in the first round, before losing his next match to second seed Holger Rune. Given a wildcard entry into the 2023 Wimbledon Championships, Peniston lost to Andy Murray in the first round in a match played on Centre Court.

In August 2023, he won his first ATP Challenger in the Winnipeg, defeating Leandro Riedi in the final.

Peniston won his second Challenger title in Crete in October 2025, overcoming Kimmer Coppejans in the final.

== Performance timeline ==
Key
W	F	SF	QF	#R	RR	Q#	DNQ	A	NH

(W) winner; (F) finalist; (SF) semifinalist; (QF) quarterfinalist; (#R) rounds 4, 3, 2, 1; (RR) round-robin stage; (Q#) qualification round; (DNQ) did not qualify; (A) absent; (NH) not held; (SR) strike rate (events won / competed); (W–L) win–loss record.
To avoid confusion and double counting, these charts are updated at the conclusion of a tournament or when the player's participation has ended.

=== Singles ===
Tournament	2019	2020	2021	2022	2023	2024	2025	2026	SR	W–L	Win %
Grand Slam tournaments
Australian Open	A	A	A	A	Q1	Q2	A	Q1	0 / 0	0–0	–
French Open	A	A	A	Q1	Q2	Q1	A		0 / 0	0–0	–
Wimbledon	Q1	NH	Q1	2R	1R	Q1	Q2		0 / 2	1–2	33%
US Open	A	A	A	Q1	A	A	A		0 / 0	0–0	–
Win–loss	0–0	0–0	0–0	1–1	0–1	0–0	0–0	0–0	0 / 2	1–2	33%
ATP Masters 1000
Indian Wells Masters	A	NH	A	A	A	A	A		0 / 0	0–0	–
Miami Open	A	NH	A	A	A	A	A		0 / 0	0–0	–
Monte Carlo Masters	A	NH	A	A	A	A	A		0 / 0	0–0	–
Madrid Open	A	NH	A	A	A	A	A		0 / 0	0-0	–
Italian Open	A	A	A	A	Q1	A	A		0 / 0	0–0	–
Canadian Open	A	NH	A	A	A	A	A		0 / 0	0–0	–
Cincinnati Masters	A	A	A	A	A	A	A		0 / 0	0–0	–
Shanghai Masters	A	NH			A	A	A		0 / 0	0–0	–
Paris Masters	A	A	A	A	A	A	A		0 / 0	0–0	–
Win–loss	0–0	0–0	0–0	0–0	0–0	0–0	0–0	0–0	0 / 0	0–0	–
Career statistics
Tournaments	0	0	0	4	2				6		
Overall win–loss	0–0	0–0	0–0	5–4	1–2				6–6		
Year-end ranking	389	378	268	167							

== ATP Challenger and ITF Futures finals ==
=== Singles: 20 (9–11) ===
Legend ATP Challenger (1–3) ITF Futures (8–8)	Finals by surface Hard (9–7) Clay (0–3) Grass (0–0) Carpet (0–1)

Result	W–L	Date	Tournament	Tier	Surface	Opponent	Score
Loss	0–1	Dec 2018	USA F35, Tallahassee	Futures	Hard	(France) Maxime Cressy	4–6, 6–7^{(4–7)}
Win	1–1	May 2019	M15 Cancún	Futures	Hard	(United States) Austin Rapp	6–4, 6–4
Win	2–1	May 2019	M15 Cancún	Futures	Hard	(Argentina) Tomás Martín Etcheverry	6–4, 7–5
Loss	2–2	Jul 2019	M25 Dublin	Futures	Carpet	(Netherlands) Igor Sijsling	4–6, 6–7^{(8–10)}
Loss	2–3	Aug 2019	M15 Hua Hin	Futures	Hard	(Chinese Taipei) Hsu Yu-hsiou	3–6, 3–6
Loss	2–4	Dec 2019	M25 Fort Worth	Futures	Hard	(Netherlands) Jesper de Jong	2–6, 0–6
Win	3–4	May 2021	M15 Heraklion	Futures	Hard	(Japan) Yuta Shimizu	6–3, 6–0
Win	4–4	May 2021	M15 Heraklion	Futures	Hard	(China) Zhang Ze	6–4, 6–1
Loss	4–5	Aug 2021	Prague, Czech Republic	Challenger	Clay	(Italy) Franco Agamenone	3–6, 1–6
Loss	4–6	Dec 2021	Antalya, Turkey	Challenger	Clay	(Portugal) Nuno Borges	4–6, 3–6
Loss	4–7	Jan 2022	M25 Loughborough	Futures	Hard	(France) Antoine Escoffier	4–6, 6–3, 3–6
Loss	4–8	May 2022	Ostrava, Czech Republic	Challenger	Clay	(France) Evan Furness	6–4, 6–7^{(6–8)}, 1–6
Win	5–8	Aug 2023	Winnipeg, Canada	Challenger	Hard	(Switzerland) Leandro Riedi	6–4, 4–6, 6–4
Win	6–8	Oct 2024	M25 Heraklion	Futures	Hard	(France) Louis Dussin	6-4, 6–1, 3–6
Win	7–8	Nov 2024	M25 Monastir	Futures	Hard	(Italy) Federico Iannaccone	6–0, 6–1
Loss	7–9	Jan 2025	M25 Sunderland	WTT	Hard	(United Kingdom) Johannus Monday	4–6, 2–6
Loss	7–10	Feb 2025	M25 Vila Real de Santo Antonio	WTT	Hard	(Portugal) Gastao Elias	2–6, 1–6
Win	8–10	Mar 2025	M25 Loulé	WTT	Hard	(Luxembourg) Chris Rodesch	3–6, 6–1, 6–3
Win	9–10	May 2025	M25 Tbilisi	WTT	Hard	(United States) Martin Damm	6–2, 3–6, 6–1
Loss	9–11	Sep 2025	M25 Pozzuoli	WTT	Hard	(Switzerland) Remy Bertola	6–7^{(5–7)}, 5–7

=== Doubles: 5 (1–4) ===
Legend ATP Challenger (0–0) ITF Futures (1–4)	Finals by surface Hard (1–3) Clay (0–1) Grass (0–0) Carpet (0–0)

Result	W–L	Date	Tournament	Tier	Surface	Partner	Opponents	Score
Loss	0–1	Sep 2017	Great Britain F6, Barnstaple	Futures	Hard	(United Kingdom) Robert Carter	(Republic of Ireland) Peter Bothwell (United Kingdom) Neil Pauffley	4–6, 7–6^{(7–5)}, [6–10]
Win	1–1	Dec 2017	Qatar F4, Doha	Futures	Hard	(United Kingdom) Andrew Watson	(United Kingdom) Richard Gabb (United Kingdom) Luke Johnson	6–3, 7–6^{(7–4)}
Loss	1–2	Aug 2018	Spain F24, Santander	Futures	Clay	(United Kingdom) Andrew Watson	(Russia) Ivan Gakhov (Spain) Jaume Pla Malfeito	4–6, 4–6
Loss	1–3	Mar 2019	M25 Calabasas	Futures	Hard	(United Kingdom) Jack Findel-Hawkins	(Bolivia) Boris Arias (United States) Sekou Bangoura	2–6, 2–6
Loss	1–4	Dec 2019	M15 Tallahassee	Futures	Hard	(United Kingdom) Jack Findel-Hawkins	(United States) Strong Kirchheimer (United States) Dennis Novikov	5–7, 3–6

== Record against top 10 players ==
=== Wins over top 10 players ===
- He has a 1–0 record against players who were, at the time the match was played, ranked in the top 10.

Season	2022	Total
Wins	1	1

#	Player	Rank	Event	Surface	Rd	Score	RPR
2022
1.	(Norway) Casper Ruud	5	Queen's Club, United Kingdom	Grass	1R	7–6^{(7–4)}, 7–6^{(7–2)}	180
