= 2021 Queen's Club Championships – Doubles =

Doubles
- 2021 Queen's Club Championships

Final
- Champions: (France) Pierre-Hugues Herbert (France) Nicolas Mahut
- Runners-up: (United States) Reilly Opelka (Australia) John Peers
- Score: 6–4, 7–5

Details
- Draw: 24

Events
Singles	Doubles
WC Singles	WC Doubles
- Queen's Club Championships

Pierre-Hugues Herbert and Nicolas Mahut defeated Reilly Opelka and John Peers in the final, 6–4, 7–5, to win the doubles tennis title at the 2021 Queen's Club Championships. It was the duo's third title at the tournament. Opelka and Peers were contesting as a new pairing in their first final.

Feliciano López and Andy Murray were the defending champions from when the event was last held in 2019, but Murray did not return to compete. López played alongside Jannik Sinner, but they lost in the second round to Nikola Mektić and Mate Pavić.

== Seeds ==
1. (Croatia) Nikola Mektić / (Croatia) Mate Pavić (quarterfinals)
2. (Colombia) Juan Sebastián Cabal / (Colombia) Robert Farah (quarterfinals)
3. (United States) Rajeev Ram / (United Kingdom) Joe Salisbury (second round)
4. (France) Pierre-Hugues Herbert / (France) Nicolas Mahut (champions)

5. (United Kingdom) Jamie Murray / (Brazil) Bruno Soares (second round)
6. (France) Jérémy Chardy / (France) Fabrice Martin (second round)
7. (New Zealand) Marcus Daniell / (Austria) Philipp Oswald (semifinals)
8. (United Kingdom) Ken Skupski / (United Kingdom) Neal Skupski (second round)

== Draw ==
Key

- Q = Qualifier
- WC = Wild card
- LL = Lucky loser
- Alt = Alternate
- ITF = ITF entry
- PR = Protected ranking
- SR = Special ranking
- SE = Special exempt
- JE = Junior exempt
- JR = Junior Accelerator Programme entrant
- CO = College Accelerator Programme entrant
- NG = Next Gen Accelerator Program entrant
- w/o = Walkover
- r = Retired
- d = Defaulted

=== Finals ===
Semifinals
(United States) Reilly Opelka (Australia) John Peers	7^{7}	6
(Australia) Alex de Minaur (United Kingdom) Cameron Norrie	6^{3}	3
4	(France) Pierre-Hugues Herbert (France) Nicolas Mahut	6	3	[11]
7	(New Zealand) Marcus Daniell (Austria) Philipp Oswald	4	6	[9]

Final
(United States) Reilly Opelka (Australia) John Peers	4	5
4	(France) Pierre-Hugues Herbert (France) Nicolas Mahut	6	7

=== Top half ===
First round
(Spain) F López (Italy) J Sinner	7^{10}	6
(United Kingdom) D Evans (United Kingdom) J O'Mara	6^{8}	2
(United States) R Opelka (Australia) J Peers	6	3	[10]
WC	(United Kingdom) A Gray (Finland) H Heliövaara	4	6	[7]
(Australia) A de Minaur (United Kingdom) C Norrie	6	6
(Italy) M Berrettini (Italy) A Vavassori	3	4
(Netherlands) M Middelkoop (Australia) J-P Smith	3	6	[7]
(Russia) A Karatsev (Australia) M Purcell	6	3	[10]

Second round
1	(Croatia) N Mektić (Croatia) M Pavić	7^{7}	7
(Spain) F López (Italy) J Sinner	6^{3}	5
(United States) R Opelka (Australia) J Peers	6^{6}	7^{7}	[10]
8	(United Kingdom) K Skupski (United Kingdom) N Skupski	7^{8}	6^{4}	[2]
3	(United States) R Ram (United Kingdom) J Salisbury	7	1	[10]
(Australia) A de Minaur (United Kingdom) C Norrie	5	6	[12]
(Russia) A Karatsev (Australia) M Purcell	6	6
5	(United Kingdom) J Murray (Brazil) B Soares	4	4

Quarterfinals
1	(Croatia) N Mektić (Croatia) M Pavić	1	2
(United States) R Opelka (Australia) J Peers	6	6
(Australia) A de Minaur (United Kingdom) C Norrie	3	6	[10]
(Russia) A Karatsev (Australia) M Purcell	6	4	[6]

Semifinals
(United States) R Opelka (Australia) J Peers	7^{7}	6
(Australia) A de Minaur (United Kingdom) C Norrie	6^{3}	3

=== Bottom half ===
First round
(Slovenia) A Bedene (Spain) A Ramos Viñolas	3	4
(Uruguay) A Behar (Ecuador) G Escobar	6	6
WC	(United Kingdom) L Broady (United Kingdom) R Peniston	7	6
(Kazakhstan) A Bublik (United States) N Monroe	5	3
Alt	(Australia) J Millman (New Zealand) A Sitak	4	6^{4}
(France) A Mannarino (France) B Paire	6	7^{7}
WC	(United Kingdom) S Parker (United Kingdom) J Ward	3	2
(United Kingdom) L Bambridge (United Kingdom) D Inglot	6	6

Second round
6	(France) J Chardy (France) F Martin	4	4
(Uruguay) A Behar (Ecuador) G Escobar	6	6
WC	(United Kingdom) L Broady (United Kingdom) R Peniston	7^{8}	2	[10]
4	(France) P-H Herbert (France) N Mahut	6^{6}	6	[12]
7	(New Zealand) M Daniell (Austria) P Oswald	6	6
(France) A Mannarino (France) B Paire	3	4
(United Kingdom) L Bambridge (United Kingdom) D Inglot	4	4
2	(Colombia) JS Cabal (Colombia) R Farah	6	6

Quarterfinals
(Uruguay) A Behar (Ecuador) G Escobar	5	4
4	(France) P-H Herbert (France) N Mahut	7	6
7	(New Zealand) M Daniell (Austria) P Oswald	4	6	[10]
2	(Colombia) JS Cabal (Colombia) R Farah	6	2	[6]

Semifinals
4	(France) P-H Herbert (France) N Mahut	6	3	[11]
7	(New Zealand) M Daniell (Austria) P Oswald	4	6	[9]
