= 2021 Queen's Club Championships – Singles =

Singles
- 2021 Queen's Club Championships

Final
- Champion: (Italy) Matteo Berrettini
- Runner-up: (United Kingdom) Cameron Norrie
- Score: 6–4, 6–7^{(5–7)}, 6–3

Details
- Draw: 32 (4Q / 3WC)
- Seeds: 8

Events
Singles	Doubles
WC Singles	WC Doubles
- Queen's Club Championships

Matteo Berrettini defeated Cameron Norrie in the final, 6–4, 6–7^{(5–7)}, 6–3, to win the singles tennis title at the 2021 Queen's Club Championships. Berrettini's win earned him his fourth career ATP Tour singles title, his first ATP 500 victory, and also made him the first player to win the tournament on their main draw debut since Boris Becker in 1985. Norrie was contesting for his first title in his fourth career final.

Feliciano López was the defending champion from when the event was last held in 2019, but he lost in the second round to Denis Shapovalov.

== Seeds ==
1. (Italy) Matteo Berrettini (champion)
2. (Canada) Denis Shapovalov (semifinals)
3. (Italy) Jannik Sinner (first round)
4. (Australia) Alex de Minaur (semifinals)
5. (Russia) Aslan Karatsev (second round)
6. (United Kingdom) Dan Evans (quarterfinals)
7. (Italy) Lorenzo Sonego (first round)
8. (Italy) Fabio Fognini (second round)

== Draw ==
Key

- Q = Qualifier
- WC = Wild card
- LL = Lucky loser
- Alt = Alternate
- ITF = ITF entry
- PR = Protected ranking
- SR = Special ranking
- SE = Special exempt
- JE = Junior exempt
- JR = Junior Accelerator Programme entrant
- CO = College Accelerator Programme entrant
- NG = Next Gen Accelerator Program entrant
- w/o = Walkover
- r = Retired
- d = Defaulted

=== Finals ===
Semifinals
1	(Italy) Matteo Berrettini	6	6
4	(Australia) Alex de Minaur	4	4
(United Kingdom) Cameron Norrie	7	6
2	(Canada) Denis Shapovalov	5	3

Final
1	(Italy) Matteo Berrettini	6	6^{5}	6
(United Kingdom) Cameron Norrie	4	7^{7}	3

=== Top half ===
First round
1	(Italy) M Berrettini	7^{7}	7^{7}
(Italy) S Travaglia	6^{5}	6^{4}
(France) B Paire	3	2
WC	(United Kingdom) A Murray	6	6
WC	(United Kingdom) L Broady	4	4
(France) A Mannarino	6	6
(Australia) A Popyrin	4	4
6	(United Kingdom) D Evans	6	6
4	(Australia) A de Minaur	3	6	6
(Serbia) L Đere	6	3	4
(United States) R Opelka	6^{4}	7	6^{6}
(Australia) J Millman	7^{7}	5	7^{8}
(Croatia) M Čilić	6	6^{5}	7^{7}
Q	(Austria) S Ofner	2	7^{7}	6^{4}
PR	(Chinese Taipei) Y-h Lu	4	6^{3}
8	(Italy) F Fognini	6	7^{7}

Second round
1	(Italy) M Berrettini	6	6
WC	(United Kingdom) A Murray	3	3
(France) A Mannarino	4	6^{7}
6	(United Kingdom) D Evans	6	7^{9}
4	(Australia) A de Minaur	6	6
(Australia) J Millman	1	3
(Croatia) M Čilić	6	7^{7}
8	(Italy) F Fognini	3	6^{4}

Quarterfinals
1	(Italy) M Berrettini	7^{7}	6
6	(United Kingdom) D Evans	6^{5}	3
4	(Australia) A de Minaur	3	6	6
(Croatia) M Čilić	6	3	4

Semifinals
1	(Italy) M Berrettini	6	6
4	(Australia) A de Minaur	4	4

=== Bottom half ===
First round
5	(Russia) A Karatsev	3	6	6
LL	(Chile) A Tabilo	6	4	2
(United Kingdom) C Norrie	4	6	6
(Spain) A Ramos Viñolas	6	3	4
(Kazakhstan) A Bublik	6	3	6
(France) J Chardy	4	6	3
WC	(United Kingdom) J Draper	7^{8}	7^{7}
3	(Italy) J Sinner	6^{6}	6^{2}
7	(Italy) L Sonego	4	4
Q	(Serbia) V Troicki	6	6
(Slovenia) A Bedene	6	3	4
(United States) F Tiafoe	4	6	6
(Spain) F López	6	7^{8}
Q	(Ukraine) I Marchenko	1	6^{6}
Q	(Australia) A Vukic	6^{6}	6^{6}
2	(Canada) D Shapovalov	7^{8}	7^{8}

Second round
5	(Russia) A Karatsev	5	2
(United Kingdom) C Norrie	7	6
(Kazakhstan) A Bublik	6^{5}	6^{0}
WC	(United Kingdom) J Draper	7^{7}	7^{7}
Q	(Serbia) V Troicki	3	6^{3}
(United States) F Tiafoe	6	7^{7}
(Spain) F López	2	3
2	(Canada) D Shapovalov	6	6

Quarterfinals
(United Kingdom) C Norrie	6	6
WC	(United Kingdom) J Draper	3	3
(United States) F Tiafoe	3	4
2	(Canada) D Shapovalov	6	6

Semifinals
(United Kingdom) C Norrie	7	6
2	(Canada) D Shapovalov	5	3

== Qualifying ==
=== Seeds ===
1. (France) Lucas Pouille (first round)
2. (Spain) Bernabé Zapata Miralles (qualifying competition)
3. (Netherlands) Botic van de Zandschulp (first round)
4. (Switzerland) Marc-Andrea Hüsler (first round)
5. (Chinese Taipei) Jason Jung (first round)
6. (Ukraine) Illya Marchenko (qualified)
7. (Chile) Alejandro Tabilo (qualifying competition, lucky loser)
8. (Austria) Sebastian Ofner (qualified)

=== Qualifiers ===
1. (Serbia) Viktor Troicki
2. (Austria) Sebastian Ofner
3. (Ukraine) Illya Marchenko
4. (Australia) Aleksandar Vukic

=== Lucky loser ===
1. (Chile) Alejandro Tabilo

=== Qualifying draw ===
==== First qualifier ====
First round
1	(France) Lucas Pouille	4	7^{7}	4
(Serbia) Viktor Troicki	6	6^{5}	6
(Italy) Roberto Marcora	3	5
7	(Chile) Alejandro Tabilo	6	7

Qualifying competition
(Serbia) Viktor Troicki	6	6
7	(Chile) Alejandro Tabilo	4	3

==== Second qualifier ====
First round
2	(Spain) Bernabé Zapata Miralles	6	6
WC	(United Kingdom) Stuart Parker	3	4
(Czech Republic) Lukáš Rosol	2	6	3
8	(Austria) Sebastian Ofner	6	3	6

Qualifying competition
2	(Spain) Bernabé Zapata Miralles	1	4
8	(Austria) Sebastian Ofner	6	6

==== Third qualifier ====
First round
3	(Netherlands) Botic van de Zandschulp	2	6	6^{4}
WC	(United Kingdom) James Ward	6	4	7^{7}
(Belgium) Ruben Bemelmans	3	6	2
6	(Ukraine) Illya Marchenko	6	1	6

Qualifying competition
WC	(United Kingdom) James Ward	4	6^{4}
6	(Ukraine) Illya Marchenko	6	7^{7}

==== Fourth qualifier ====
First round
4	(Switzerland) Marc-Andrea Hüsler	6	5	4
WC	(United Kingdom) Ryan Peniston	4	7	6
(Australia) Aleksandar Vukic	7^{7}	7^{10}
5	(Chinese Taipei) Jason Jung	6^{4}	6^{8}

Qualifying competition
WC	(United Kingdom) Ryan Peniston	6	6^{8}	4
(Australia) Aleksandar Vukic	4	7^{10}	6
