= 2021 Queen's Club Championships =

- Date: 14–20 June
- Edition: 118th
- Category: ATP Tour 500 series
- Draw: 32S / 24D
- Surface: Grass
- Location: London, United Kingdom
- Venue: Queen's Club

Champions

Singles
- (Italy) Matteo Berrettini

Doubles
- (France) Pierre-Hugues Herbert / (France) Nicolas Mahut

Wheelchair singles
- (United Kingdom) Gordon Reid

Wheelchair doubles
- (Belgium) Joachim Gérard / (Sweden) Stefan Olsson
← 2019 ·	Queen's Club Championships	· 2022 →

The 2021 Queen's Club Championships (also known as the cinch Championships for sponsorship reasons) was a tennis tournament played on outdoor grass courts at the Queen's Club in London, United Kingdom from 14 to 20 June 2021. It was the 118th edition of the event and part of the ATP Tour 500 series of the 2021 ATP Tour.

== Finals ==
=== Singles ===
- (Italy) Matteo Berrettini defeated (United Kingdom) Cameron Norrie, 6–4, 6–7^{(5–7)}, 6–3

=== Doubles ===
- (France) Pierre-Hugues Herbert / (France) Nicolas Mahut defeated (United States) Reilly Opelka / (Australia) John Peers, 6–4, 7–5.

=== Wheelchair singles ===
- (United Kingdom) Gordon Reid defeated (Argentina) Gustavo Fernández, 6–2, 6–2

=== Wheelchair doubles ===
- (Belgium) Joachim Gérard / (Sweden) Stefan Olsson defeated (Netherlands) Tom Egberink / (Argentina) Gustavo Fernández, 1–6, 7–6^{(7–4)}, [10–6]

== Points and prize money ==
=== Points distribution ===
Event	W	F	SF	QF	Round of 16	Round of 32	Round of 64	Q	Q2	Q1
Singles	500	300	180	90	45	20	0	10	4	0
Doubles	500	300	180	90	0	—	—	45	25	0

=== Prize money ===
Event	W	F	SF	QF	Round of 16	Round of 32	Q2	Q1
Singles	€113,785	€84,075	€59,860	€40,765	€25,480	€14,650	€6,750	€3,565
Doubles*	€40,200	€30,240	€21,760	€14,340	€9,020	€5,000	—	—

_{*per team}

== ATP singles main-draw entrants ==
=== Seeds ===
Country	Player	Rank^{1}	Seed
ITA	Matteo Berrettini	9	1
CAN	Denis Shapovalov	14	2
ITA	Jannik Sinner	19	3
AUS	Alex de Minaur	22	4
RUS	Aslan Karatsev	26	5
GBR	Dan Evans	27	6
ITA	Lorenzo Sonego	28	7
ITA	Fabio Fognini	29	8

- ^{1} Rankings are as of May 24, 2021.

=== Other entrants ===
The following players received wildcards into the main draw:

- (United Kingdom) Liam Broady
- (United Kingdom) Jack Draper
- (United Kingdom) Andy Murray

The following player received entry using a protected ranking:

- (Chinese Taipei) Lu Yen-hsun

The following players received entry from the qualifying draw:

- (Ukraine) Illya Marchenko
- (Austria) Sebastian Ofner
- (Serbia) Viktor Troicki
- (Australia) Aleksandar Vukic

The following player received entry as a lucky loser:

- (Chile) Alejandro Tabilo

=== Withdrawals ===
Before the tournament

- (Spain) Alejandro Davidovich Fokina → replaced by (France) Jérémy Chardy
- (Canada) Milos Raonic → replaced by (United States) Frances Tiafoe
- (Serbia) Filip Krajinović → replaced by (Chile) Alejandro Tabilo
- (Argentina) Diego Schwartzman → replaced by (Australia) Alexei Popyrin
- (Switzerland) Stan Wawrinka → replaced by (Spain) Feliciano López

== ATP doubles main-draw entrants ==
=== Seeds ===
Country	Player	Country	Player	Rank^{1}	Seed
CRO	Nikola Mektić	CRO	Mate Pavić	3	1
COL	Juan Sebastián Cabal	COL	Robert Farah	7	2
USA	Rajeev Ram	GBR	Joe Salisbury	15	3
FRA	Pierre-Hugues Herbert	FRA	Nicolas Mahut	26	4
GBR	Jamie Murray	BRA	Bruno Soares	33	5
FRA	Jérémy Chardy	FRA	Fabrice Martin	58	6
NZL	Marcus Daniell	AUT	Philipp Oswald	75	7
GBR	Ken Skupski	GBR	Neal Skupski	80	8

- ^{1} Rankings are as of May 31, 2021.

=== Other entrants ===
The following pairs received wildcards into the doubles main draw:

- (United Kingdom) Liam Broady / (United Kingdom) Ryan Peniston
- (United Kingdom) Alastair Gray / (Finland) Harri Heliövaara
- (United Kingdom) Stuart Parker / (United Kingdom) James Ward

The following pair received entry as an alternate:

- (Australia) John Millman / (New Zealand) Artem Sitak

=== Withdrawals ===
Before the tournament

- (El Salvador) Marcelo Arévalo / (Netherlands) Matwé Middelkoop → replaced by (Netherlands) Matwé Middelkoop / (Australia) John-Patrick Smith
- (Kazakhstan) Alexander Bublik / (United States) Taylor Fritz → replaced by (Kazakhstan) Alexander Bublik / (United States) Nicholas Monroe
- (Spain) Alejandro Davidovich Fokina / (Spain) Albert Ramos Viñolas → replaced by (Slovenia) Aljaž Bedene / (Spain) Albert Ramos Viñolas
- (Bulgaria) Grigor Dimitrov / (Spain) Feliciano López → replaced by (Spain) Feliciano López / (Italy) Jannik Sinner
- (Serbia) Laslo Đere / (Serbia) Filip Krajinović → replaced by (Australia) John Millman / (New Zealand) Artem Sitak
- (Finland) Henri Kontinen / (France) Édouard Roger-Vasselin → replaced by (United Kingdom) Luke Bambridge / (United Kingdom) Dominic Inglot
