= 2018 Queen's Club Championships – Singles =

Singles
- 2018 Queen's Club Championships

Final
- Champion: (Croatia) Marin Čilić
- Runner-up: (Serbia) Novak Djokovic
- Score: 5–7, 7–6^{(7–4)}, 6–3

Details
- Draw: 32
- Seeds: 8

Events
Singles	Doubles
WC Singles	WC Doubles
- Queen's Club Championships

Marin Čilić defeated Novak Djokovic in the final, 5–7, 7–6^{(7–4)}, 6–3 to win the singles tennis title at the 2018 Queen's Club Championships. He saved a championship point in the second set. This was Djokovic's first ATP Tour final in almost a year, and Čilić's second victory over Djokovic in their 16 matches played.

Feliciano López was the defending champion, but lost in the quarterfinals to Nick Kyrgios.

== Seeds ==
1. (Croatia) Marin Čilić (champion)
2. (Bulgaria) Grigor Dimitrov (second round)
3. (South Africa) Kevin Anderson (first round)
4. (Belgium) David Goffin (first round)
5. (United States) Sam Querrey (quarterfinals)
6. (United States) Jack Sock (first round)
7. (United Kingdom) Kyle Edmund (second round)
8. (Czech Republic) Tomáš Berdych (first round)

== Draw ==
Key

- Q = Qualifier
- WC = Wild card
- LL = Lucky loser
- Alt = Alternate
- ITF = ITF entry
- PR = Protected ranking
- SR = Special ranking
- SE = Special exempt
- JE = Junior exempt
- JR = Junior Accelerator Programme entrant
- CO = College Accelerator Programme entrant
- NG = Next Gen Accelerator Program entrant
- w/o = Walkover
- r = Retired
- d = Defaulted

=== Finals ===
Semifinals
1	(Croatia) Marin Čilić	7^{7}	7^{7}
(Australia) Nick Kyrgios	6^{3}	6^{4}
SE	(France) Jérémy Chardy	6^{5}	4
WC	(Serbia) Novak Djokovic	7^{7}	6

Final
1	(Croatia) Marin Čilić	5	7^{7}	6
WC	(Serbia) Novak Djokovic	7	6^{4}	3

=== Top half ===
First round
1	(Croatia) M Čilić	6	6
(Spain) F Verdasco	3	4
(Canada) D Shapovalov	6^{7}	6^{6}
(Luxembourg) G Müller	7^{9}	7^{8}
(Switzerland) S Wawrinka	6	6
WC	(United Kingdom) C Norrie	2	3
WC	(United Kingdom) J Clarke	3	3
5	(United States) S Querrey	6	6
4	(Belgium) D Goffin	3	7^{9}	3
(Spain) F López	6	6^{7}	6
(Canada) M Raonic	6	3
Q	(India) Y Bhambri	1	1^{r}
(Australia) N Kyrgios	2	7^{7}	7
(United Kingdom) A Murray	6	6^{4}	5
(United States) R Harrison	6^{4}	4
7	(United Kingdom) K Edmund	7^{7}	6

Second round
1	(Croatia) M Čilić	4	6	6
(Luxembourg) G Müller	6	3	3
(Switzerland) S Wawrinka	5	7^{7}	1
5	(United States) S Querrey	7	6^{3}	6
(Spain) F López	w/o
(Canada) M Raonic
(Australia) N Kyrgios	7^{7}	6^{5}	6
7	(United Kingdom) K Edmund	6^{3}	7^{7}	3

Quarterfinals
1	(Croatia) M Čilić	7^{7}	6
5	(United States) S Querrey	6^{3}	2
(Spain) F López	6^{5}	6^{3}
(Australia) N Kyrgios	7^{7}	7^{7}

Semifinals
1	(Croatia) M Čilić	7^{7}	7^{7}
(Australia) N Kyrgios	6^{3}	6^{4}

=== Bottom half ===
First round
6	(United States) J Sock	5	3
(Russia) D Medvedev	7	6
Q	(United States) T Smyczek	2	4
SE	(France) J Chardy	6	6
(United States) J Donaldson	4	6^{4}
(United States) F Tiafoe	6	7^{7}
(Argentina) L Mayer	7^{7}	4	7^{7}
3	(South Africa) K Anderson	6^{4}	6	6^{3}
8	(Czech Republic) T Berdych	5	6	3
Q	(France) J Benneteau	7	3	6
(France) A Mannarino	6	0	7
WC	(United Kingdom) D Evans	4	6	5
Q	(Australia) J Millman	2	1
WC	(Serbia) N Djokovic	6	6
(Bosnia and Herzegovina) D Džumhur	3	7^{7}	3
2	(Bulgaria) G Dimitrov	6	6^{4}	6

Second round
(Russia) D Medvedev	6^{6}	3
SE	(France) J Chardy	7^{8}	6
(United States) F Tiafoe	6	2	6
(Argentina) L Mayer	4	6	4
Q	(France) J Benneteau	6^{4}	3
(France) A Mannarino	7^{7}	6
WC	(Serbia) N Djokovic	6	6
2	(Bulgaria) G Dimitrov	4	1

Quarterfinals
SE	(France) J Chardy	6	6
(United States) F Tiafoe	4	4
(France) A Mannarino	5	1
WC	(Serbia) N Djokovic	7	6

Semifinals
SE	(France) J Chardy	6^{5}	4
WC	(Serbia) N Djokovic	7^{7}	6

== Qualifying ==
=== Seeds ===
1. (France) Julien Benneteau (qualified)
2. (Australia) John Millman (qualified)
3. (United States) Taylor Fritz (qualifying competition)
4. (France) Pierre-Hugues Herbert (first round)
5. (India) Yuki Bhambri (qualified)
6. (Kazakhstan) Mikhail Kukushkin (first round)
7. (Romania) Marius Copil (qualifying competition)
8. (United States) Mackenzie McDonald (qualifying competition)

=== Qualifiers ===
1. (France) Julien Benneteau
2. (Australia) John Millman
3. (India) Yuki Bhambri
4. (United States) Tim Smyczek

=== Qualifying draw ===
==== First qualifier ====
First round
1	(France) Julien Benneteau	7^{7}	4	7
(Italy) Simone Bolelli	6^{4}	6	5
(United States) Bjorn Fratangelo	3	7	2
8	(United States) Mackenzie McDonald	6	5	6

Qualifying competition
1	(France) Julien Benneteau	7	6
8	(United States) Mackenzie McDonald	5	3

==== Second qualifier ====
First round
2	(Australia) John Millman	3	6	7^{7}
(France) Nicolas Mahut	6	3	6^{4}
WC	(United Kingdom) Edward Corrie	4	6	3
7	(Romania) Marius Copil	6	3	6

Qualifying competition
2	(Australia) John Millman	6	6
7	(Romania) Marius Copil	3	3

==== Third qualifier ====
First round
3	(United States) Taylor Fritz	6	3	6
(Italy) Lorenzo Sonego	2	6	1
WC	(United Kingdom) James Ward	6	1	2
5	(India) Yuki Bhambri	4	6	6

Qualifying competition
3	(United States) Taylor Fritz	4	2
5	(India) Yuki Bhambri	6	6

==== Fourth qualifier ====
First round
4	(France) Pierre-Hugues Herbert	6^{5}	6^{5}
WC	(Australia) Thanasi Kokkinakis	7^{7}	7^{7}
(United States) Tim Smyczek	6	3	7^{7}
6	(Kazakhstan) Mikhail Kukushkin	4	6	6^{5}

Qualifying competition
WC	(Australia) Thanasi Kokkinakis	6	4	3
(United States) Tim Smyczek	2	6	6
