= 2018 Queen's Club Championships – Wheelchair singles =

Wheelchair singles
- 2018 Queen's Club Championships

Final
- Champion: (Sweden) Stefan Olsson
- Runner-up: (France) Stéphane Houdet
- Score: 6–1, 6–4

Events
Singles	Doubles
WC Singles	WC Doubles
Queen's Club Championships	· 2019 →

Stefan Olsson won the first Wheelchair Singles title at the Queen's Club Championships, defeating Stéphane Houdet in the final, 6–1, 6–4.

== Seeds ==
1. (United Kingdom) Alfie Hewett (semifinals)
2. (France) Stéphane Houdet (final)

== Draw ==
=== Key ===
- Q = Qualifier
- WC = Wild card
- LL = Lucky loser
- Alt = Alternate
- SE = Special exempt
- PR = Protected ranking
- ITF = ITF entry
- JE = Junior exempt
- w/o = Walkover
- r = Retired
- d = Defaulted
- SR = Special ranking

=== Finals ===
Quarterfinals			Semifinals					Final
			1	(United Kingdom) Alfie Hewett	3	3
(Sweden) Stefan Olsson	6	6		(Sweden) Stefan Olsson	6	6
(Spain) Daniel Caverzaschi	0	0						(Sweden) Stefan Olsson	6	6
(United Kingdom) Gordon Reid	7^{7}	7						(France) Stéphane Houdet	1	4
(France) Nicolas Peifer	6^{1}	5		(United Kingdom) Gordon Reid	6	4	2
			2	(France) Stéphane Houdet	4	6	6
