= 2018 Queen's Club Championships =

- Date: 18–24 June
- Edition: 116th
- Category: ATP World Tour 500 series
- Draw: 32S / 16D
- Prize money: €1,836,660
- Surface: Grass
- Location: London, United Kingdom
- Venue: Queen's Club

Champions

Singles
- (Croatia) Marin Čilić

Doubles
- (Finland) Henri Kontinen / (Australia) John Peers

Wheelchair singles
- (Sweden) Stefan Olsson

Wheelchair doubles
- (France) Stéphane Houdet / (France) Nicolas Peifer
- Queen's Club Championships

The 2018 Queen's Club Championships (also known as the Fever-Tree Championships for sponsorship reasons) was a men's tennis tournament played on outdoor grass courts. It was the 116th edition of the event and part of the ATP World Tour 500 series of the 2018 ATP World Tour. It is taking place at the Queen's Club in London, United Kingdom from 18 June until 24 June 2018. The tournament marked the return of five-time champion Andy Murray who had been recovering from a hip injury. First-seeded Marin Čilić won the singles title.

== Finals ==
=== Singles ===
- (Croatia) Marin Čilić defeated (Serbia) Novak Djokovic, 5–7, 7–6^{(7–4)}, 6–3

=== Doubles ===
- (Finland) Henri Kontinen / (Australia) John Peers defeated (United Kingdom) Jamie Murray / (Brazil) Bruno Soares 6–4, 6–3

=== Wheelchair singles ===
- (Sweden) Stefan Olsson defeated (France) Stéphane Houdet, 6–1, 6–4

=== Wheelchair doubles ===
- (France) Stéphane Houdet / (France) Nicolas Peifer won a round robin competition against the teams of (United Kingdom) Alfie Hewett / (United Kingdom) Gordon Reid and (Spain) Daniel Caverzaschi / (Sweden) Stefan Olsson

== Points and prize money ==
=== Point distribution ===
Event	W	F	SF	QF	Round of 16	Round of 32	Q	Q2	Q1
Singles	500	300	180	90	45	0	20	10	0
Doubles	500	300	180	90	0	—N/a	45	25	0

=== Prize money ===
Event	W	F	SF	QF	Round of 16	Round of 32	Q	Q2	Q1
Singles	€427,590	€209,630	€105,480	€53,645	€27,860	€14,690	€0	€3,250	€1,660
Doubles*	€128,740	€63,030	€31,620	€16,230	€8,390	—N/a	—N/a	—N/a	—N/a

_{*per team}

== Singles main draw entrants ==
=== Seeds ===
Country	Player	Rank^{1}	Seed
CRO	Marin Čilić	5	1
BUL	Grigor Dimitrov	6	2
RSA	Kevin Anderson	8	3
BEL	David Goffin	9	4
USA	Sam Querrey	13	5
USA	Jack Sock	14	6
GBR	Kyle Edmund	18	7
CZE	Tomáš Berdych	19	8

- Rankings are as of June 11, 2018.

=== Other entrants ===
The following players received wildcards into the singles main draw:

- (United Kingdom) Jay Clarke
- (Serbia) Novak Djokovic
- (United Kingdom) Dan Evans
- (United Kingdom) Cameron Norrie

The following player received entry as a special exempt:

- (France) Jérémy Chardy

The following players received entry from the qualifying draw:

- (France) Julien Benneteau
- (India) Yuki Bhambri
- (Australia) John Millman
- (United States) Tim Smyczek

=== Withdrawals ===
Before the tournament

- (Argentina) Juan Martín del Potro →replaced by (United States) Ryan Harrison
- (Serbia) Filip Krajinović →replaced by (United States) Frances Tiafoe
- (Spain) Rafael Nadal →replaced by (Russia) Daniil Medvedev
- (Argentina) Diego Schwartzman →replaced by (United States) Jared Donaldson
- (France) Jo-Wilfried Tsonga →replaced by (Argentina) Leonardo Mayer

During the tournament

- (Canada) Milos Raonic

== Doubles main draw entrants ==
=== Seeds ===
Country	Player	Country	Player	Rank^{1}	Seed
AUT	Oliver Marach	CRO	Mate Pavić	3	1
FIN	Henri Kontinen	AUS	John Peers	15	2
FRA	Pierre-Hugues Herbert	FRA	Nicolas Mahut	19	3
GBR	Jamie Murray	BRA	Bruno Soares	25	4

- Rankings are as of June 11, 2018.

=== Other entrants ===
The following pairs received wildcards into the doubles main draw:

- (Serbia) Novak Djokovic / (Switzerland) Stan Wawrinka
- (Australia) Lleyton Hewitt / (Australia) Nick Kyrgios

The following pair received entry from the qualifying draw:

- (Canada) Daniel Nestor / (Canada) Denis Shapovalov

The following pair received entry as lucky losers:

- (New Zealand) Marcus Daniell / (Netherlands) Wesley Koolhof

=== Withdrawals ===
Before the tournament

- (Czech Republic) Tomáš Berdych
