= 2021 Queen's Club Championships – Wheelchair singles =

Wheelchair singles
- 2021 Queen's Club Championships

Final
- Champion: (United Kingdom) Gordon Reid
- Runner-up: (Argentina) Gustavo Fernández
- Score: 6–2, 6–2

Events
Singles	Doubles
WC Singles	WC Doubles
← 2019 ·	Queen's Club Championships	· 2022 →

Gordon Reid defeated Gustavo Fernández in the final, 6–2, 6–2, to win the wheelchair singles tennis title at the 2021 Queen's Club Championships. Reid saved two match points in his semifinal match against Joachim Gérard en route to the title.

Alfie Hewett was the defending champion from when the tournament was last held in 2019, but he withdrew before the first round.

== Seeds ==
1. (Argentina) Gustavo Fernández (final)
2. (United Kingdom) Alfie Hewett (withdrew)

== Draw ==
=== Key ===
- Q = Qualifier
- WC = Wild card
- LL = Lucky loser
- Alt = Alternate
- SE = Special exempt
- PR = Protected ranking
- ITF = ITF entry
- JE = Junior exempt
- w/o = Walkover
- r = Retired
- d = Defaulted
- SR = Special ranking

=== Finals ===
Quarterfinals
1	(Argentina) Gustavo Fernández	6	6
(Sweden) Stefan Olsson	2	2
(United Kingdom) Dermot Bailey	2	0
(France) Stéphane Houdet	6	6
(Belgium) Joachim Gérard	6	1	[10]
(Netherlands) Tom Egberink	1	6	6
(United Kingdom) Gordon Reid
2	(United Kingdom) Alfie Hewett	w/o

Semifinals
1	(Argentina) Gustavo Fernández	6	3	[11]
(France) Stéphane Houdet	4	6	[9]
(Belgium) Joachim Gérard	6	1	[11]
2	(United Kingdom) Gordon Reid	3	6	[13]

Final
1	(Argentina) Gustavo Fernández	2	2
(United Kingdom) Gordon Reid	6	6
