= 2018 Queen's Club Championships – Wheelchair doubles =

Wheelchair doubles
- 2018 Queen's Club Championships

Final
- Champions: (France) Stéphane Houdet (France) Nicolas Peifer

Events
Singles	Doubles
WC Singles	WC Doubles
- Queen's Club Championships

Stéphane Houdet and Nicolas Peifer won the first Wheelchair Doubles title at the Queen's Club Championships in a round robin.

== Draw ==
Key

- Q = Qualifier
- WC = Wild card
- LL = Lucky loser
- Alt = Alternate
- ITF = ITF entry
- PR = Protected ranking
- SR = Special ranking
- SE = Special exempt
- JE = Junior exempt
- JR = Junior Accelerator Programme entrant
- CO = College Accelerator Programme entrant
- NG = Next Gen Accelerator Program entrant
- w/o = Walkover
- r = Retired
- d = Defaulted

=== Round robin ===
	(Spain) Caverzaschi (Sweden) Olsson	(France) Houdet (France) Peifer	(United Kingdom) Hewett (United Kingdom) Reid	RR; W–L	Set; W–L	Game; W–L	Standings
(Spain) Daniel Caverzaschi (Sweden) Stefan Olsson		3–6, 2–6	1–6, 1–6	0–2	0–4	7–24	3
(France) Stéphane Houdet (France) Nicolas Peifer	6–3, 6–2		7–6^{(7–4)}, 7–5	2–0	4–0	26–16	1
(United Kingdom) Alfie Hewett (United Kingdom) Gordon Reid	6–1, 6–1	6–7^{(4–7)}, 5–7		1–1	2–2	23–16	2
