= 2018 Queen's Club Championships – Doubles =

Doubles
- 2018 Queen's Club Championships

Final
- Champions: (Finland) Henri Kontinen (Australia) John Peers
- Runners-up: (United Kingdom) Jamie Murray (Brazil) Bruno Soares
- Score: 6–4, 6–3

Details
- Draw: 16

Events
Singles	Doubles
WC Singles	WC Doubles
- Queen's Club Championships

Jamie Murray and Bruno Soares were the defending champions, but lost in the final to Henri Kontinen and John Peers, 4–6, 3–6.

== Seeds ==
1. (Austria) Oliver Marach / (Croatia) Mate Pavić (semifinals)
2. (Finland) Henri Kontinen / (Australia) John Peers (champions)
3. (France) Pierre-Hugues Herbert / (France) Nicolas Mahut (first round)
4. (United Kingdom) Jamie Murray / (Brazil) Bruno Soares (final)

== Draw ==
Key

- Q = Qualifier
- WC = Wild card
- LL = Lucky loser
- Alt = Alternate
- ITF = ITF entry
- PR = Protected ranking
- SR = Special ranking
- SE = Special exempt
- JE = Junior exempt
- JR = Junior Accelerator Programme entrant
- CO = College Accelerator Programme entrant
- NG = Next Gen Accelerator Program entrant
- w/o = Walkover
- r = Retired
- d = Defaulted

=== Draw ===
First round
1	(Austria) O Marach (Croatia) M Pavić	6	6^{5}	[10]
(Spain) F López (Spain) M López	4	7^{7}	[7]
(India) R Bopanna (France) É Roger-Vasselin	6	7^{7}
(South Africa) K Anderson (France) J Benneteau	3	6^{3}
4	(United Kingdom) J Murray (Brazil) B Soares	4	7^{7}	[10]
(France) A Mannarino (France) F Martin	6	6^{3}	[8]
LL	(New Zealand) M Daniell (Netherlands) W Koolhof	6	7^{7}
WC	(Serbia) N Djokovic (Switzerland) S Wawrinka	4	6^{2}
(Bulgaria) G Dimitrov (United States) R Harrison	6	6^{2}	[3]
(United Kingdom) K Edmund (United Kingdom) N Skupski	3	7^{7}	[10]
WC	(Australia) L Hewitt (Australia) N Kyrgios	6	3	[10]
3	(France) P-H Herbert (France) N Mahut	4	6	[6]
(Mexico) S González (United States) S Querrey	7^{7}	2	[2]
(United States) M Bryan (United States) J Sock	6^{5}	6	[10]
Q	(Canada) D Nestor (Canada) D Shapovalov	3	5
2	(Finland) H Kontinen (Australia) J Peers	6	7

Quarterfinals
1	(Austria) O Marach (Croatia) M Pavić	6	6^{6}	[10]
(India) R Bopanna (France) É Roger-Vasselin	4	7^{8}	[7]
4	(United Kingdom) J Murray (Brazil) B Soares	6	6^{2}	[10]
LL	(New Zealand) M Daniell (Netherlands) W Koolhof	3	7^{7}	[7]
(United Kingdom) K Edmund (United Kingdom) N Skupski	6	6
WC	(Australia) L Hewitt (Australia) N Kyrgios	1	4
(United States) M Bryan (United States) J Sock	3	4
2	(Finland) H Kontinen (Australia) J Peers	6	6

Semifinals
1	(Austria) O Marach (Croatia) M Pavić	3	7^{8}	[7]
4	(United Kingdom) J Murray (Brazil) B Soares	6	6^{6}	[10]
(United Kingdom) K Edmund (United Kingdom) N Skupski	6^{5}	7	[6]
2	(Finland) H Kontinen (Australia) J Peers	7^{7}	5	[10]

Final
4	(United Kingdom) J Murray (Brazil) B Soares	4	3
2	(Finland) H Kontinen (Australia) J Peers	6	6

== Qualifying ==
=== Seeds ===
1. (New Zealand) Marcus Daniell / (Netherlands) Wesley Koolhof (first round, Lucky losers)
2. (Brazil) Marcelo Demoliner / (Argentina) Leonardo Mayer (first round)

=== Qualifiers ===
1. (Canada) Daniel Nestor / (Canada) Denis Shapovalov

=== Lucky losers ===
1. (New Zealand) Marcus Daniell / (Netherlands) Wesley Koolhof

=== Qualifying draw ===
First round
1	(New Zealand) Marcus Daniell (Netherlands) Wesley Koolhof	6	4	[7]
WC	(Romania) Marius Copil (United Kingdom) Ken Skupski	4	6	[10]
(Canada) Daniel Nestor (Canada) Denis Shapovalov	6	7^{7}
2	(Brazil) Marcelo Demoliner (Argentina) Leonardo Mayer	3	6^{2}

Qualifying competition
WC	(Romania) Marius Copil (United Kingdom) Ken Skupski	2	6^{4}
(Canada) Daniel Nestor (Canada) Denis Shapovalov	6	7^{7}
