= Dermot Bailey =

British wheelchair tennis player

- Country (sports): Great Britain
- Residence: Kettering, England, United Kingdom
- Born: 18 February 1994 (age 31)
- Plays: Left-handed

Dermot Bailey (born 18 February 1994) is a British professional wheelchair tennis player. He was a semifinalist in the 2019 Queen's Club Championships – Wheelchair Singles and a quarterfinalist in the 2021 Queen's Club Championships – Wheelchair Singles.

He competed in wheelchair tennis at the 2020 Summer Paralympics.

== Life ==
Bailey was diagnosed with Legg–Calvé–Perthes disease and took up wheelchair tennis aged 8. He worked as a financial analyst at Kettering General Hospital but left to focus on tennis.
