= 2019 Queen's Club Championships – Wheelchair singles =

Wheelchair singles
- 2019 Queen's Club Championships

Final
- Champion: (United Kingdom) Alfie Hewett
- Runner-up: (United Kingdom) Gordon Reid
- Score: 6–2, 7–5

Events
Singles	Doubles
WC Singles	WC Doubles
← 2018 ·	Queen's Club Championships	· 2021 →

Stefan Olsson was the defending champion but lost in the semifinals to Gordon Reid.

Alfie Hewett won the title, defeating Reid in the final, 6–2, 7–5.

== Seeds ==
1. (Belgium) Joachim Gérard (quarterfinals)
2. (United Kingdom) Alfie Hewett (champion)

== Draw ==
=== Key ===
- Q = Qualifier
- WC = Wild card
- LL = Lucky loser
- Alt = Alternate
- SE = Special exempt
- PR = Protected ranking
- ITF = ITF entry
- JE = Junior exempt
- w/o = Walkover
- r = Retired
- d = Defaulted
- SR = Special ranking

=== Finals ===
Quarterfinals
1	(Belgium) Joachim Gérard	4	4
(Sweden) Stefan Olsson	6	6
WC	(France) Gaetan Menguy	2	2
(United Kingdom) Gordon Reid	6	6
WC	(France) Geoffrey Jasiak	0	3
(United Kingdom) Dermot Bailey	6	6
(France) Frédéric Cattaneo	0	1
2	(United Kingdom) Alfie Hewett	6	6

Semifinals
(Sweden) Stefan Olsson	6	3	5
(United Kingdom) Gordon Reid	4	6	7
(United Kingdom) Dermot Bailey	2	3
2	(United Kingdom) Alfie Hewett	6	6

Final
(United Kingdom) Gordon Reid	2	5
2	(United Kingdom) Alfie Hewett	6	7
