= 2019 Queen's Club Championships – Doubles =

Doubles
- 2019 Queen's Club Championships

Final
- Champions: (Spain) Feliciano López (United Kingdom) Andy Murray
- Runners-up: (United States) Rajeev Ram (United Kingdom) Joe Salisbury
- Score: 7–6^{(8–6)}, 5–7, [10–5]

Details
- Draw: 16

Events
Singles	Doubles
WC Singles	WC Doubles
- Queen's Club Championships

Henri Kontinen and John Peers were the defending champions, but lost in the semifinals to Feliciano López and Andy Murray.

López and Murray went on to win the title, defeating Rajeev Ram and Joe Salisbury in the final, 7–6^{(8–6)}, 5–7, [10–5]. It was Murray's first doubles title and sixth overall title at the Queen's Club, an all-time record. López became the first player to complete a sweep of both singles and doubles titles at the tournament since Mark Philippoussis in 1997.

== Seeds ==
1. (Colombia) Juan Sebastián Cabal / (Colombia) Robert Farah (first round)
2. (Croatia) Mate Pavić / (Brazil) Bruno Soares (quarterfinals)
3. (Finland) Henri Kontinen / (Australia) John Peers (semifinals)
4. (United States) Bob Bryan / (United States) Mike Bryan (semifinals)

== Draw ==
Key

- Q = Qualifier
- WC = Wild card
- LL = Lucky loser
- Alt = Alternate
- ITF = ITF entry
- PR = Protected ranking
- SR = Special ranking
- SE = Special exempt
- JE = Junior exempt
- JR = Junior Accelerator Programme entrant
- CO = College Accelerator Programme entrant
- NG = Next Gen Accelerator Program entrant
- w/o = Walkover
- r = Retired
- d = Defaulted

=== Draw ===
First round
1	(Colombia) JS Cabal (Colombia) R Farah	6^{5}	3
PR	(Spain) F López (United Kingdom) A Murray	7^{7}	6
WC	(United Kingdom) D Evans (United Kingdom) K Skupski	6	7
(Canada) F Auger-Aliassime (Australia) A de Minaur	3	5
3	(Finland) H Kontinen (Australia) J Peers	7^{7}	3	[10]
LL	(Sweden) R Lindstedt (New Zealand) A Sitak	6^{5}	6	[3]
(United Kingdom) J Murray (United Kingdom) N Skupski	7^{7}	1	[10]
(France) N Mahut (France) É Roger-Vasselin	6^{5}	6	[7]
Q	(France) J Chardy (France) F Martin	7	6
(Croatia) M Čilić (Croatia) I Dodig	5	4
WC	(United Kingdom) L Bambridge (United Kingdom) J O'Mara	6^{1}	4
4	(United States) B Bryan (United States) M Bryan	7^{7}	6
(Chile) C Garín (Argentina) D Schwartzman	6^{6}	4
(United States) R Ram (United Kingdom) J Salisbury	7^{8}	6
(France) L Pouille (Switzerland) S Wawrinka	7	3	[5]
2	(Croatia) M Pavić (Brazil) B Soares	5	6	[10]

Quarterfinals
PR	(Spain) F López (United Kingdom) A Murray	6	7^{7}
WC	(United Kingdom) D Evans (United Kingdom) K Skupski	4	6^{3}
3	(Finland) H Kontinen (Australia) J Peers	7	7^{8}
(United Kingdom) J Murray (United Kingdom) N Skupski	5	6^{6}
Q	(France) J Chardy (France) F Martin	3	6^{6}
4	(United States) B Bryan (United States) M Bryan	6	7^{8}
(United States) R Ram (United Kingdom) J Salisbury	6	6
2	(Croatia) M Pavić (Brazil) B Soares	4	4

Semifinals
PR	(Spain) F López (United Kingdom) A Murray	7	6^{5}	[10]
3	(Finland) H Kontinen (Australia) J Peers	5	7^{7}	[7]
4	(United States) B Bryan (United States) M Bryan	6^{4}	6^{8}
(United States) R Ram (United Kingdom) J Salisbury	7^{7}	7^{10}

Final
PR	(Spain) F López (United Kingdom) A Murray	7^{8}	5	[10]
(United States) R Ram (United Kingdom) J Salisbury	6^{6}	7	[5]

== Qualifying ==
=== Seeds ===
1. (France) Jérémy Chardy / (France) Fabrice Martin (qualified)
2. (Sweden) Robert Lindstedt / (New Zealand) Artem Sitak (qualifying competition, lucky losers)

=== Qualifiers ===
1. (France) Jérémy Chardy / (France) Fabrice Martin

=== Lucky losers ===
1. (Sweden) Robert Lindstedt / (New Zealand) Artem Sitak

=== Qualifying draw ===
First round
1	(France) Jérémy Chardy (France) Fabrice Martin	6	6
(Italy) Marco Cecchinato (Spain) Fernando Verdasco	2	2
WC	(United Kingdom) Jack Draper (United Kingdom) Cameron Norrie
2	(Sweden) Robert Lindstedt (New Zealand) Artem Sitak	w/o

Qualifying competition
1	(France) Jérémy Chardy (France) Fabrice Martin	6	3	[10]
2	(Sweden) Robert Lindstedt (New Zealand) Artem Sitak	1	6	[5]
