= 2019 Queen's Club Championships =

- Date: 17–23 June
- Edition: 117th
- Category: ATP Tour 500 series
- Draw: 32S / 16D
- Prize money: €1,836,660
- Surface: Grass
- Location: London, United Kingdom
- Venue: Queen's Club

Champions

Singles
- (Spain) Feliciano López

Doubles
- (Spain) Feliciano López / (United Kingdom) Andy Murray

Wheelchair singles
- (United Kingdom) Alfie Hewett

Wheelchair doubles
- (Belgium) Joachim Gérard / (Sweden) Stefan Olsson
- Queen's Club Championships

The 2019 Queen's Club Championships (also known as the Fever-Tree Championships for sponsorship reasons) was a tennis tournament played on outdoor grass courts. It was the 117th edition of the event and part of the ATP Tour 500 series of the 2019 ATP Tour. It took place at the Queen's Club in London, United Kingdom from 17 June to 23 June.

== Finals ==
=== Singles ===
- (Spain) Feliciano López defeated (France) Gilles Simon, 6–2, 6–7^{(4–7)}, 7–6^{(7–2)}

=== Doubles ===
- (Spain) Feliciano López / (United Kingdom) Andy Murray defeated (United States) Rajeev Ram / (United Kingdom) Joe Salisbury, 7–6^{(8–6)}, 5–7, [10–5]

=== Wheelchair singles ===
- (United Kingdom) Alfie Hewett defeated (United Kingdom) Gordon Reid, 6–2, 7–5

=== Wheelchair doubles ===
- (Belgium) Joachim Gérard / (Sweden) Stefan Olsson defeated (United Kingdom) Alfie Hewett / (United Kingdom) Gordon Reid, 6–1, 6–0

== Points and prize money ==
=== Point distribution ===
Event	W	F	SF	QF	Round of 16	Round of 32	Q	Q2	Q1
Singles	500	300	180	90	45	0	20	10	0
Doubles	500	300	180	90	0	—N/a	45	25	0

=== Prize money ===
Event	W	F	SF	QF	Round of 16	Round of 32	Q	Q2	Q1
Singles	€427,590	€209,630	€105,480	€53,645	€27,860	€14,690	€0	€3,250	€1,660
Doubles*	€128,740	€63,030	€31,620	€16,230	€8,390	—N/a	—N/a	—N/a	—N/a

_{*per team}

== ATP singles main-draw entrants ==
=== Seeds ===
Country	Player	Rank^{1}	Seed
GRE	Stefanos Tsitsipas	6	1
RSA	Kevin Anderson	8	2
ARG	Juan Martín del Potro	12	3
RUS	Daniil Medvedev	13	4
CRO	Marin Čilić	15	5
CAN	Milos Raonic	18	6
SUI	Stan Wawrinka	19	7
CAN	Félix Auger-Aliassime	21	8

- ^{1} Rankings are as of June 10, 2019.

=== Other entrants ===
The following players received wildcards into the main draw:

- (United Kingdom) Jay Clarke
- (United Kingdom) Dan Evans
- (Spain) Feliciano López

The following player received entry as a special exempt:

- ~~(France) Adrian Mannarino~~

The following players received entry from the qualifying draw:

- (Slovenia) Aljaž Bedene
- (Kazakhstan) Alexander Bublik
- (France) Nicolas Mahut
- (United Kingdom) James Ward

The following player received entry as a lucky loser:

- (Spain) Roberto Carballés Baena

=== Withdrawals ===
Before the tournament

- (France) Adrian Mannarino → replaced by (Spain) Roberto Carballés Baena

During the tournament

- (Argentina) Juan Martín del Potro

== ATP doubles main-draw entrants ==
=== Seeds ===
Country	Player	Country	Player	Rank^{1}	Seed
COL	Juan Sebastián Cabal	COL	Robert Farah	10	1
CRO	Mate Pavić	BRA	Bruno Soares	23	2
FIN	Henri Kontinen	AUS	John Peers	32	3
USA	Bob Bryan	USA	Mike Bryan	37	4

- ^{1} Rankings are as of June 10, 2019.

=== Other entrants ===
The following pairs received wildcards into the doubles main draw:

- (United Kingdom) Luke Bambridge / (United Kingdom) Jonny O'Mara
- (United Kingdom) Dan Evans / (United Kingdom) Ken Skupski

The following pair received entry from the qualifying draw:

- (France) Jérémy Chardy / (France) Fabrice Martin

The following pair received entry as lucky losers:

- (Sweden) Robert Lindstedt / (New Zealand) Artem Sitak

=== Withdrawals ===
Before the tournament

- (Argentina) Juan Martín del Potro
