= 2019 Queen's Club Championships – Singles =

Singles
- 2019 Queen's Club Championships

Final
- Champion: (Spain) Feliciano López
- Runner-up: (France) Gilles Simon
- Score: 6–2, 6–7^{(4–7)}, 7–6^{(7–2)}

Details
- Draw: 32
- Seeds: 8

Events
Singles	Doubles
WC Singles	WC Doubles
- Queen's Club Championships

Marin Čilić was the defending champion, but lost in the second round to Diego Schwartzman.

Feliciano López won the title for the second time in three years, defeating Gilles Simon in the final, 6–2, 6–7^{(4–7)}, 7–6^{(7–2)}.

== Seeds ==
1. (Greece) Stefanos Tsitsipas (quarterfinals)
2. (South Africa) Kevin Anderson (second round)
3. (Argentina) Juan Martín del Potro (second round, withdrew due to fractured kneecap)
4. (Russia) Daniil Medvedev (semifinals)
5. (Croatia) Marin Čilić (second round)
6. (Canada) Milos Raonic (quarterfinals)
7. (Switzerland) Stan Wawrinka (second round)
8. (Canada) Félix Auger-Aliassime (semifinals)

== Draw ==
Key

- Q = Qualifier
- WC = Wild card
- LL = Lucky loser
- Alt = Alternate
- ITF = ITF entry
- PR = Protected ranking
- SR = Special ranking
- SE = Special exempt
- JE = Junior exempt
- JR = Junior Accelerator Programme entrant
- CO = College Accelerator Programme entrant
- NG = Next Gen Accelerator Program entrant
- w/o = Walkover
- r = Retired
- d = Defaulted

=== Finals ===
Semifinals
8	(Canada) Félix Auger-Aliassime	7^{7}	3	4
WC	(Spain) Feliciano López	6^{3}	6	6
4	(Russia) Daniil Medvedev	7^{7}	4	3
(France) Gilles Simon	6^{4}	6	6

Final
WC	(Spain) Feliciano López	6	6^{4}	7^{7}
(France) Gilles Simon	2	7^{7}	6^{2}

=== Top half ===
First round
1	(Greece) S Tsitsipas	6	7
(United Kingdom) K Edmund	3	5
(France) J Chardy	6	6
(Kazakhstan) M Kukushkin	1	3
(Australia) N Kyrgios	7^{7}	6
LL	(Spain) R Carballés Baena	6^{4}	3
(Bulgaria) G Dimitrov	4	4
8	(Canada) F Auger-Aliassime	6	6
3	(Argentina) JM del Potro	7	6
(Canada) D Shapovalov	5	4
(Hungary) M Fucsovics	7^{7}	3	4
WC	(Spain) F López	6^{4}	6	6
(Australia) A de Minaur	6	4	4
Q	(Slovenia) A Bedene	3	6	6
(Italy) M Cecchinato	3	2
6	(Canada) M Raonic	6	6

Second round
1	(Greece) S Tsitsipas	4	7^{7}	7^{7}
(France) J Chardy	6	6^{0}	6^{4}
(Australia) N Kyrgios	7^{7}	6^{3}	5
8	(Canada) F Auger-Aliassime	6^{4}	7^{7}	7
3	(Argentina) JM del Potro
WC	(Spain) F López	w/o
Q	(Slovenia) A Bedene	3	6^{3}
6	(Canada) M Raonic	6	7^{7}

Quarterfinals
1	(Greece) S Tsitsipas	5	2
8	(Canada) F Auger-Aliassime	7	6
WC	(Spain) F López	4	6	7^{7}
6	(Canada) M Raonic	6	4	6^{5}

Semifinals
8	(Canada) F Auger-Aliassime	7^{7}	3	4
WC	(Spain) F López	6^{3}	6	6

=== Bottom half ===
First round
5	(Croatia) M Čilić	6	7^{7}
(Chile) C Garín	1	6^{5}
(Argentina) D Schwartzman	6	6
Q	(Kazakhstan) A Bublik	2	3
WC	(United Kingdom) J Clarke	6^{2}	1
(France) L Pouille	7^{7}	6
(Spain) F Verdasco	2	4
4	(Russia) D Medvedev	6	6
7	(Switzerland) S Wawrinka	6	6
WC	(United Kingdom) D Evans	3	4
Q	(France) N Mahut	6	7^{7}
(United States) F Tiafoe	3	6^{5}
(France) G Simon	3	6	7^{7}
Q	(United Kingdom) J Ward	6	3	6^{2}
(United Kingdom) C Norrie	6	6^{5}	4
2	(South Africa) K Anderson	4	7^{7}	6

Second round
5	(Croatia) M Čilić	4	4
(Argentina) D Schwartzman	6	6
(France) L Pouille	6^{9}	7^{7}	4
4	(Russia) D Medvedev	7^{11}	6^{5}	6
7	(Switzerland) S Wawrinka	6	5	6^{2}
Q	(France) N Mahut	3	7	7^{7}
(France) G Simon	6	4	6
2	(South Africa) K Anderson	1	6	4

Quarterfinals
(Argentina) D Schwartzman	2	2
4	(Russia) D Medvedev	6	6
Q	(France) N Mahut	6^{5}	7	6^{3}
(France) G Simon	7^{7}	5	7^{7}

Semifinals
4	(Russia) D Medvedev	7^{7}	4	3
(France) G Simon	6^{4}	6	6

== Qualifying ==
=== Seeds ===
1. (Chile) Nicolás Jarry (first round)
2. (Spain) Roberto Carballés Baena (qualifying competition, lucky loser)
3. (Kazakhstan) Alexander Bublik (qualified)
4. (Croatia) Ivo Karlović (qualifying competition)
5. (Australia) Bernard Tomic (first round)
6. (United States) Bradley Klahn (first round)
7. (India) Prajnesh Gunneswaran (first round)
8. (Slovenia) Aljaž Bedene (qualified)

=== Qualifiers ===
1. (France) Nicolas Mahut
2. (Slovenia) Aljaž Bedene
3. (Kazakhstan) Alexander Bublik
4. (United Kingdom) James Ward

=== Lucky loser ===
1. (Spain) Roberto Carballés Baena

=== Qualifying draw ===
==== First qualifier ====
First round
1	(Chile) Nicolás Jarry	3	7^{7}	6^{6}
WC	(France) Nicolas Mahut	6	6^{4}	7^{8}
(Spain) Alejandro Davidovich Fokina	6	7^{7}
5	(Australia) Bernard Tomic	4	6^{3}

Qualifying competition
WC	(France) Nicolas Mahut	7	4	6
(Spain) Alejandro Davidovich Fokina	5	6	3

==== Second qualifier ====
First round
2	(Spain) Roberto Carballés Baena	6	5	6
(Australia) Alexei Popyrin	2	7	4
(Estonia) Jürgen Zopp	2	6^{2}
8	(Slovenia) Aljaž Bedene	6	7^{7}

Qualifying competition
2	(Spain) Roberto Carballés Baena	6^{5}	6	1
8	(Slovenia) Aljaž Bedene	7^{7}	3	6

==== Third qualifier ====
First round
3	(Kazakhstan) Alexander Bublik	6	1	6
WC	(United Kingdom) Jack Draper	2	6	3
(United States) Tommy Paul	6	6
6	(United States) Bradley Klahn	1	4

Qualifying competition
3	(Kazakhstan) Alexander Bublik	6	7^{7}
(United States) Tommy Paul	4	6^{4}

==== Fourth qualifier ====
First round
4	(Croatia) Ivo Karlović	6	7
(Canada) Peter Polansky	3	5
WC	(United Kingdom) James Ward	6	6
7	(India) Prajnesh Gunneswaran	1	4

Qualifying competition
4	(Croatia) Ivo Karlović	6^{4}	4
WC	(United Kingdom) James Ward	7^{7}	6
